= Macedonia in the Eurovision Song Contest 2016 =

- Eurovision Song Contest 2016
- Country: Macedonia
- Selection process: Internal selection
- Announcement date: Artist: 24 November 2015; Song: 7 March 2016

Competing entry
- Song: "Dona"
- Artist: Kaliopi
- Songwriters: Kaliopi; Romeo Grill

Placement
- Semi-final result: Failed to qualify (11th)

Participation chronology

Macedonia (Note: Officially under the provisional appellation "former Yugoslav Republic of Macedonia", abbreviated "FYR Macedonia".) was represented at the Eurovision Song Contest 2016 with the song "Dona" written by Kaliopi and Romeo Grill. The song was performed by Kaliopi, who was internally selected by the Macedonian broadcaster Macedonian Radio Television (MRT) to compete for Macedonia at the 2016 contest in Stockholm, Sweden. Kaliopi previously represented Macedonia in the Eurovision Song Contest 2012 with the song "Crno i belo", placing thirteenth in the final of the competition. At the time of Kaliopi's selection, the last time Macedonia qualified to compete in the final of the Eurovision Song Contest was when she represented the nation in 2012. Kaliopi's appointment as the Macedonian representative was announced on 24 November 2015, while her song, "Dona", was presented to the public in a television special titled Kaliopi za Makedonija ("Kaliopi for Macedonia") on 7 March 2016.

Macedonia was drawn to compete in the second semi-final of the Eurovision Song Contest which took place on 12 May 2016. Performing during the show in position 8, "Dona" was not announced among the top 10 entries of the second semi-final and therefore did not qualify to compete in the final. It was later revealed that Macedonia placed eleventh out of the 18 participating countries in the semi-final with 88 points.

== Background ==
Prior to the 2016 contest, Macedonia had participated in the Eurovision Song Contest fifteen times since its first entry in 1998. The nation's best result in the contest to this point was twelfth, which it achieved in 2006 with the song "Ninanajna" performed by Elena Risteska. Following the introduction of semi-finals for the 2004, Macedonia had featured in only five finals.

The Macedonian national broadcaster, Macedonian Radio Television (MRT), broadcasts the event within Macedonia and organises the selection process for the nation's entry. Macedonia had previously selected their entry for the Eurovision Song Contest through both national finals and internal selections. MRT confirmed their intentions to participate at the 2016 Eurovision Song Contest on 25 September 2015. Between 2008 and 2011, Macedonia selected their entries using the national final Skopje Fest. During this period, the nation failed to qualify to the final on every occasion. Between 2012 and 2014, the broadcaster internally selected Macedonia's entry, resulting in a single qualification to the final during this period in 2012. For 2015, the nation returned to using Skopje Fest as a national final, selecting Daniel Kajmakoski and the song "Autumn Leaves" as their entry. Their 2015 entry failed to qualify Macedonia to the final for a third consecutive year in a row. For 2016, the broadcaster opted to internally select the Macedonian entry.

== Before Eurovision ==
=== Internal selection ===
On 24 November 2015, MRT announced that they had internally selected Kaliopi to represent Macedonia in Stockholm. Kaliopi previously competed in the contest in 2012 where she performed the song "Crno i belo" and placed thirteenth in the final. In 1996, she was also the proposed Macedonian entry with the song "Samo ti"; however, the entry was eliminated in an audio-only pre-qualifying round. Kaliopi had previously attempted to participate in the Eurovision Song Contest on several occasions. Her earliest attempt was in 1987 when she competed in the Yugoslav national final with the song "Emanuel" which placed tenth. The singer had also competed in several Macedonian national final selections over the years: in 1998 with the song "Ne zaboravaj" which placed ninth, in 2006 with the song "Silna" which placed sixth, and in 2009 with the song "Rum Dum Dum" which she performed in a duet with Naum Petreski and placed second.

On 16 February 2016, it was announced that Kaliopi would perform the song "Dona" at the Eurovision Song Contest 2016. "Dona" was presented to the public in a special show hosted by Marko Mark and Aleksandra Jovanovska titled Kaliopi za Makedonija ("Kaliopi for Macedonia"), which took place on 7 March 2016 and was broadcast on MRT 1, MRT Sat and online via the broadcaster's official website mrt.com.mk. In addition to presenting Kaliopi's 2016 Eurovision entry, the show was dedicated to Kaliopi's musical career and featured highlights from her previous Eurovision participation in 2012 as well as performances of songs from her repertoire together with several young musicians: Marijana Mariangel, David Temelkov, Ivona Jovanović, Ivana Naumova and Trajče Georgiev. In an interview for Macedonian newspaper Večer in November 2015, Kaliopi stated that her contest entry would be performed in Macedonian and that she would once again work with Romeo Grill, who composed her entry in 2012. Kaliopi wrote the lyrics for the song herself.

When I heard the powerful melody that Romeo Grill had composed, I was swept away and knew that I had to write lyrics to breathe even more life into our song. When we recorded Dona we knew we had a special song. And great songs like this are usually used to bring important messages to everyone. Dona is the essence of the song. Dona that cares for us, Dona that gives us strength, and Dona that unites us. And what's most important for each one of us is that at some place at a certain time in our lives there was and always will be one Dona! My heart and voice through my song wants millions of diverse people across Europe to #ComeTogether.

— Kaliopi

=== Promotion ===
Kaliopi made several appearances across Europe to specifically promote "Dona" as the Macedonian Eurovision entry. Between 21 March and 30 March, Kaliopi completed a tour of the ex-Yugoslav region, visiting Belgrade, Sarajevo, Ljubljana and Zagreb and giving interviews to media outlets and appearing during talk show programmes to discuss her Eurovision participation; Kaliopi performed "Dona" during the RTV SLO1 programme Vikend paket on 27 March. On 3 April, Kaliopi performed during the Eurovision Pre-Party, which was held at the Izvestia Hall in Moscow, Russia and hosted by Dmitry Guberniev. On 9 April, Kaliopi performed during the Eurovision in Concert event which was held at the Melkweg venue in Amsterdam, Netherlands and hosted by Cornald Maas and Hera Björk. On 12 April, Kaliopi completed promotional activities in Bulgaria. On 17 April, Kaliopi performed during the London Eurovision Party, which was held at the Café de Paris venue in London, United Kingdom and hosted by Nicki French and Paddy O'Connell. On 20 April, Kaliopi completed promotional activities in Albania where she provided media outlets with interviews, appeared during the TVSH programme Kolor and recorded a performance of "Dona" for the TV Klan programme E diela shqiptare, which was broadcast on 24 April.

== At Eurovision ==
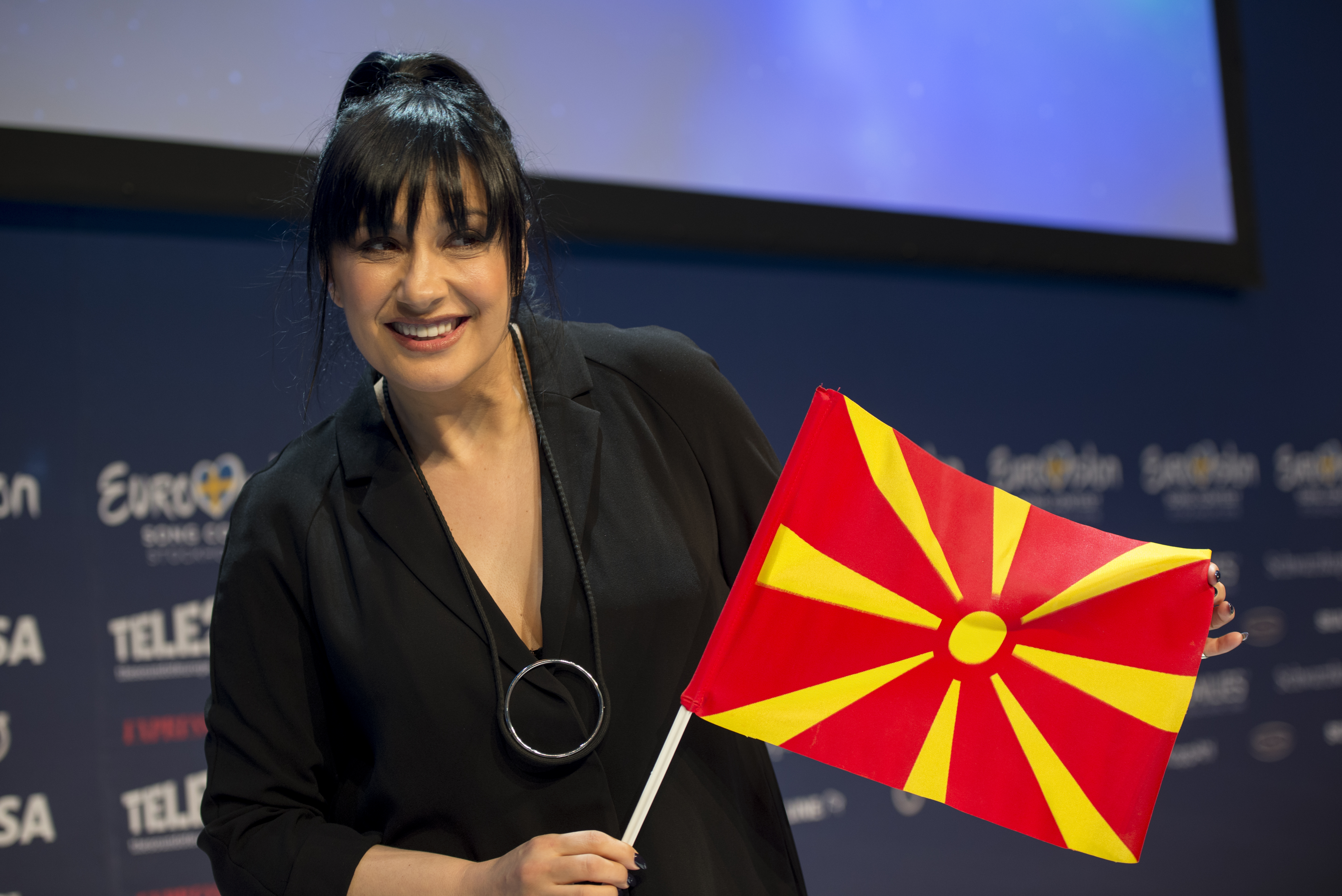
Kaliopi during a press meet and greet

According to Eurovision rules, all nations with the exceptions of the host country and the "Big Five" (France, Germany, Italy, Spain and the United Kingdom) are required to qualify from one of two semi-finals in order to compete for the final; the top ten countries from each semi-final progress to the final. The European Broadcasting Union (EBU) split up the competing countries into six different pots based on voting patterns from previous contests, with countries with favourable voting histories put into the same pot. On 25 January 2016, a special allocation draw was held which placed each country into one of the two semi-finals, as well as which half of the show they would perform in. Macedonia was placed into the second semi-final, to be held on 12 May 2016, and was scheduled to perform in the first half of the show.

Once all the competing songs for the 2016 contest had been released, the running order for the semi-finals was decided by the shows' producers rather than through another draw, so that similar songs were not placed next to each other. Macedonia was set to perform in position 8, following the entry from Ireland and before the entry from Lithuania.

The two semi-finals and final were broadcast in Macedonia on MRT 1 with commentary by Karolina Petkovska. The Macedonian spokesperson, who announced the top 12-point score awarded by the Macedonian jury during the final, was Dijana Gogova.

=== Semi-final ===
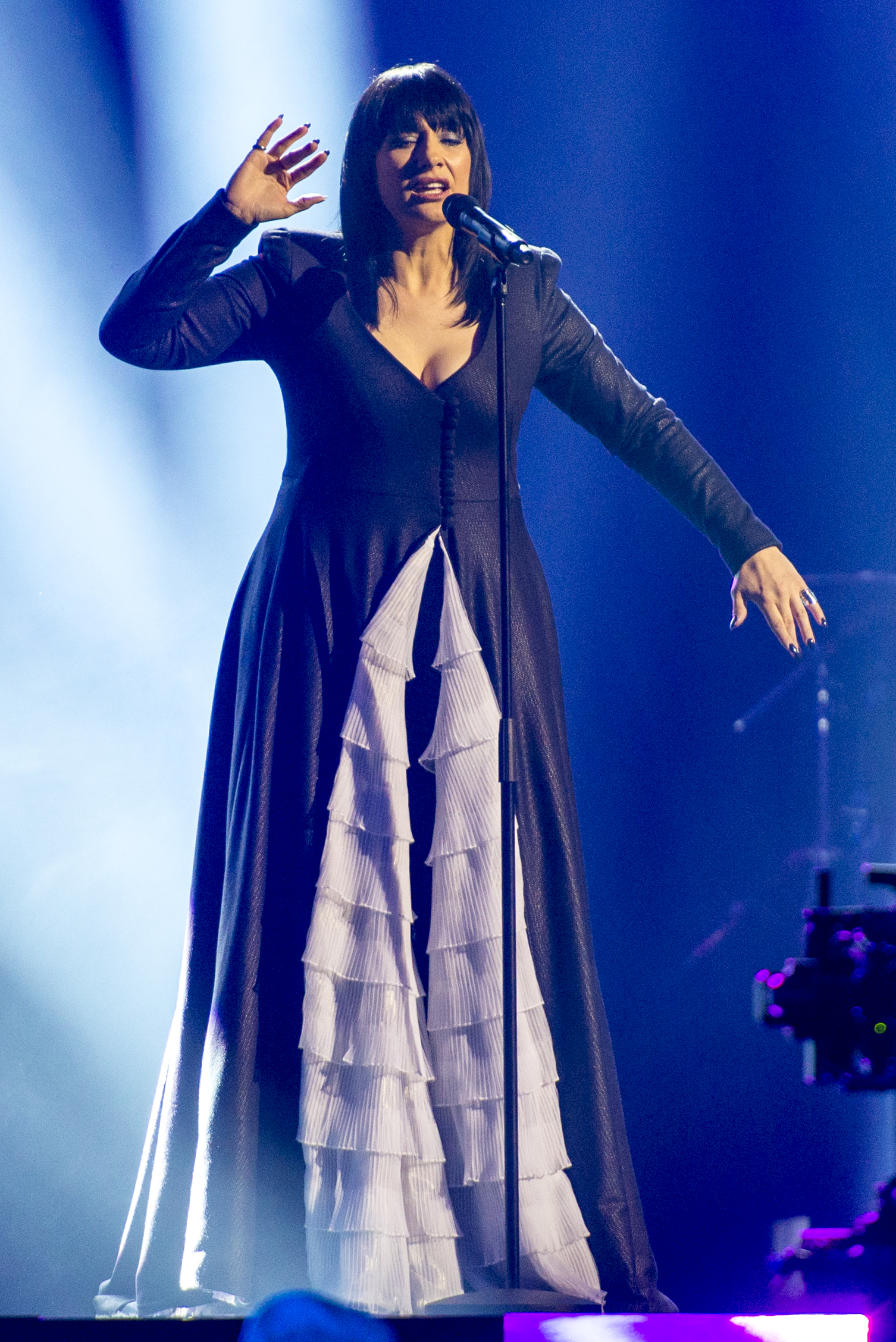
Kaliopi during a rehearsal before the second semi-final

Kaliopi took part in technical rehearsals on 4 and 7 May, followed by dress rehearsals on 11 and 12 May. This included the jury show on 11 May where the professional juries of each country watched and voted on the competing entries.

The Macedonian performance featured Kaliopi performing in a long black and white dress, designed by Roze Trajcevska, at the centre of the stage flanked by four backing vocalists on one side and a drummer on the other side. The stage colours were predominately black and white with the background LED screens displaying red designs during the final chorus. The drummer that joined Kaliopi on stage was Goran Mihajlovski and the four backing vocalists were Maja Sazdanovska, Marija Naumovska, Julija Karamitrova-Ognenoska and Kalina Velkovska.

At the end of the show, Macedonia was not announced among the top 10 entries in the second semi-final and therefore failed to qualify to compete in the final. It was later revealed that Macedonia placed eleventh in the semi-final, receiving a total of 88 points: 54 points from the televoting and 34 points from the juries.

=== Voting ===
Voting during the three shows was conducted under a new system that involved each country now awarding two sets of points from 1-8, 10 and 12: one from their professional jury and the other from televoting. Each nation's jury consisted of five music industry professionals who are citizens of the country they represent, with their names published before the contest to ensure transparency. This jury judged each entry based on: vocal capacity; the stage performance; the song's composition and originality; and the overall impression by the act. In addition, no member of a national jury was permitted to be related in any way to any of the competing acts in such a way that they cannot vote impartially and independently. The individual rankings of each jury member as well as the nation's televoting results were released shortly after the grand final.

Below is a breakdown of points awarded to Macedonia and awarded by Macedonia in the second semi-final and grand final of the contest, and the breakdown of the jury voting and televoting conducted during the two shows:

==== Points awarded to Macedonia ====
Points awarded to Macedonia (Semi-final 2)
Score	Televote	Jury
12 points	Albania; Serbia	Albania; Serbia
10 points	Slovenia	
8 points	Bulgaria	Israel
7 points		
6 points		
5 points		
4 points	Australia; Switzerland	
3 points		
2 points	Israel; Italy	Australia
1 point		

==== Points awarded by Macedonia ====
Points awarded by Macedonia (Semi-final 2)
Score	Televote	Jury
12 points	Albania	Serbia
10 points	Serbia	Ukraine
8 points	Bulgaria	Bulgaria
7 points	Latvia	Slovenia
6 points	Ukraine	Israel
5 points	Belgium	Lithuania
4 points	Australia	Australia
3 points	Slovenia	Belgium
2 points	Norway	Latvia
1 point	Poland	Georgia

Points awarded by Macedonia (Final)
Score	Televote	Jury
12 points	Serbia	Ukraine
10 points	Bulgaria	Bulgaria
8 points	Russia	Australia
7 points	Armenia	Serbia
6 points	Ukraine	Croatia
5 points	Croatia	Israel
4 points	Belgium	Belgium
3 points	Australia	Latvia
2 points	Poland	Netherlands
1 point	Italy	Azerbaijan

==== Detailed voting results ====
The following members comprised the Macedonian jury:

- Vanco Dimitrov (jury chairperson) – composer, singer, music journalist and editor
- Nataša Mijatović Krstevska (Miyatta) – singer, songwriter
- Goran Naumovski – singer
- Aleksandar Ristovski (Prince) – composer, producer, singer, guitar player, songwriter
- Nade Talevska – singer

Detailed voting results from Macedonia (Semi-final 2)
R/O	Country	Jury							Televote	
R/O	Country	V. Dimitrov	Miyatta	G. Naumovski	Prince	N. Talevska	Rank	Points	Rank	Points
01	Latvia	17	3	8	17	5	9	2	4	7
02	Poland	1	16	12	16	12	12		10	1
03	Switzerland	16	11	11	15	10	14		13	
04	Israel	3	5	6	14	8	5	6	17	
05	Belarus	15	14	16	10	9	15		11	
06	Serbia	2	2	1	2	1	1	12	2	10
07	Ireland	12	6	13	11	15	13		15	
08	Macedonia									
09	Lithuania	9	9	4	13	4	6	5	14	
10	Australia	13	15	2	9	3	7	4	7	4
11	Slovenia	8	7	7	6	7	4	7	8	3
12	Bulgaria	4	4	5	1	6	3	8	3	8
13	Denmark	7	17	14	12	17	17		16	
14	Ukraine	5	1	3	4	2	2	10	5	6
15	Norway	14	13	15	8	14	16		9	2
16	Georgia	6	12	17	3	13	10	1	12	
17	Albania	10	10	10	5	16	11		1	12
18	Belgium	11	8	9	7	11	8	3	6	5

Detailed voting results from Macedonia (Final)
R/O	Country	Jury							Televote	
R/O	Country	V. Dimitrov	Miyatta	G. Naumovski	Prince	N. Talevska	Rank	Points	Rank	Points
01	Belgium	19	7	11	4	13	7	4	7	4
02	Czech Republic	20	15	10	11	18	17		25	
03	Netherlands	5	8	24	2	24	9	2	19	
04	Azerbaijan	21	16	8	12	10	10	1	24	
05	Hungary	22	24	12	13	8	20		14	
06	Italy	11	17	21	14	21	22		10	1
07	Israel	14	6	7	15	12	6	5	16	
08	Bulgaria	6	4	4	3	7	2	10	2	10
09	Sweden	10	13	23	1	22	13		15	
10	Germany	18	25	17	16	23	24		23	
11	France	12	14	19	17	11	16		11	
12	Poland	2	23	9	18	17	12		9	2
13	Australia	7	3	3	9	3	3	8	8	3
14	Cyprus	23	18	25	19	25	25		17	
15	Serbia	3	2	2	20	1	4	7	1	12
16	Lithuania	24	22	5	21	5	19		18	
17	Croatia	9	11	6	7	14	5	6	6	5
18	Russia	1	9	18	22	19	11		3	8
19	Spain	13	21	20	6	9	14		20	
20	Latvia	17	5	22	10	6	8	3	13	
21	Ukraine	4	1	1	5	2	1	12	5	6
22	Malta	25	19	14	23	15	23		21	
23	Georgia	26	20	26	24	26	26		26	
24	Austria	8	10	13	25	20	18		12	
25	United Kingdom	15	26	16	8	16	21		22	
26	Armenia	16	12	15	26	4	15		4	7
