= Buta Palace =

Music venue in Baku, Azerbaijan

- Interactive map of Buta Palace
- Address: Heydar Aliyev Avenue, Surakhany Circle
- Location: Baku, Azerbaijan
- Coordinates: 40°26′15″N 50°01′23″E
- Seating type: Seating and standing
- Capacity: 2,000
- Type: Performing arts center

Construction
- Opened: 2006

Website
- butapalace.az

The Buta Palace is one of the principal performing arts centers and music venues of Baku.

== Facilities ==
It consists of two event halls and an adjacent parking lot for 800 cars. The greater hall is a caravanserai-stylized venue, capable of accommodating about 2,000 visitors. The minor hall is designed for conferences and presentations and can house 400 visitors. The size of the greater hall is 1,572 square metres (16,920 sq ft) and the minor hall — 652 square metres (7,020 sq ft).

== Events ==
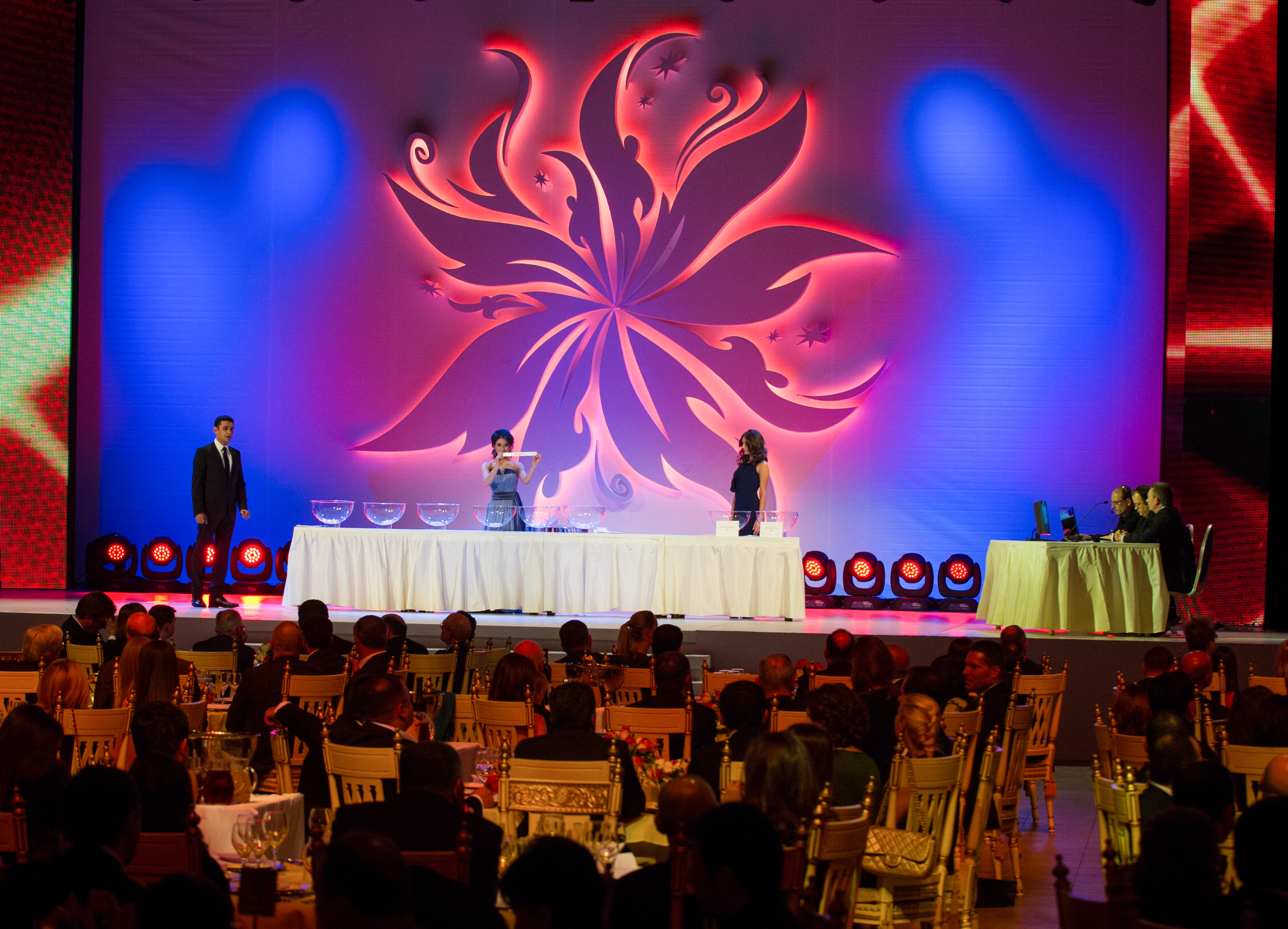
Semi-final allocation draw ceremony for Eurovision 2012

The Buta Palace hosted a number of sizeable events, including the semifinal allocation-draw of the Eurovision Song Contest 2012. It has also hosted performances of various artists (David Vendetta, Pitbull, 50 Cent, G-Unit, Akon, Chris Willis, and others).
