= Georgia in the Eurovision Song Contest 2012 =

- Eurovision Song Contest 2012
- Participating broadcaster: Georgian Public Broadcaster (GPB)
- Country: Georgia
- Selection process: National final
- Selection date: 19 February 2012

Competing entry
- Song: "I'm a Joker"
- Artist: Anri Jokhadze
- Songwriters: Rusudan Chkhaidze; Bibi Kvachadze

Placement
- Semi-final result: Failed to qualify (14th)

Participation chronology

Georgia was represented at the Eurovision Song Contest 2012 with the song "I'm a Joker", written by Rusudan Chkhaidze and Bibi Kvachadze, and performed by Anri Jokhadze. The Georgian participating broadcaster, Georgian Public Broadcaster (GPB), held a national final in order to select its entry for the contest. An open call for submissions was held which resulted in the shortlisting of nine entries that were presented to the public during a televised production on 19 February 2012. The results of a public televote combined with the votes of an expert jury resulted in the selection of "I'm a Joker" performed by Anri Jokhadze as the Georgian entry.

Georgia was drawn to compete in the first semi-final of the Eurovision Song Contest which took place on 24 May 2012. Performing during the show in position 12, "I'm a Joker" was not announced among the top 10 entries of the first semi-final and therefore did not qualify to compete in the final. This marked the first time that Georgia failed to qualify to the final of the Eurovision Song Contest from a semi-final since its first entry in 2007. It was later revealed that Georgia placed fourteenth out of the 18 participating countries in the semi-final with 36 points.

== Background ==
Prior to the 2012 contest, Georgia had participated in the Eurovision Song Contest four times since their first entry in 2007. The nation's highest placing in the contest, to this point, has been ninth place, which was achieved on two occasions: in 2010 with the song "Shine" performed by Sofia Nizharadze and in 2011 with the song "One More Day" performed by Eldrine. The nation briefly withdrew from the contest in 2009 after the European Broadcasting Union (EBU) rejected the Georgian entry, "We Don't Wanna Put In", for perceived political references to Vladimir Putin who was the Russian Prime Minister at the time. The withdrawal and fallout was tied to tense relations between Georgia and then host country Russia, which stemmed from the 2008 Russo-Georgian War. Following the introduction of semi-finals, Georgia has managed to qualify to the final on each occasion the nation has participated in.

The Georgian national broadcaster, Georgian Public Broadcaster (GPB), broadcasts the event within Georgia and organises the selection process for the nation's entry. GPB confirmed their intentions to participate at the 2012 Eurovision Song Contest on 9 December 2011. Georgia has traditionally selected their entry for the Eurovision Song Contest via a national final, a method which was continued for their 2012 participation.

== Before Eurovision ==
=== National final ===
GPB opened a public submission from 15 December 2011 until 15 January 2012, which was later extended to 25 January 2012. Songs were required to be performed in either English or Georgian. 13 entries were received by the submission deadline and an expert commission consisting of producers of the GPB First Channel selected the top nine songs from the received submissions, which were announced on 13 February 2012 and presented to the public via a special programme on 19 February 2012 at the GPB studios in Tbilisi, hosted by Temo Kvirkvelia and broadcast on the GPB First Channel as well as online at the broadcaster's website 1tv.ge and the official Eurovision Song Contest website eurovision.tv.

The winner, "I'm a Joker" performed by Anri Jokhadze, was determined upon by the 50/50 combination of the votes of an expert jury and a public televote. The jury consisted of Gia Chanturia (general director of GPB), Mamuka Megrelishvili (music producer of GPB), Nikoloz Tsetskhladze (Head of the GPB Management Department), Sopho Nizharadze (singer) and Sopho Khalvashi (singer). In addition to the performances of the competing entries, Phikria Mamphoria, Candy (which won the Junior Eurovision Song Contest 2011 for Georgia), Eldrine (which represented Georgia in 2011) and Sabina Babayeva (who would represent Azerbaijan in 2012) performed as guests.

Key: Winner

Final – 19 February 2012
R/O	Artist	Song	Songwriter(s)
1	Mirror Illusion	"Whisper"	Sophie Mariamidze, Anna Matiashvili, Mariam Makarashvili
2	November	"Letter to a Friend"	Davit Mchedlishvili, Giorgi Mukhigulashvili
3	Industrial City	"Broken"	Levan Kekelia, Jemal Mirzashvili, Archil Chkhetia, Sandro Tsiklauri, Nika Bakradze
4	Leo Jee	"It's My Life"	Levan Jibladze, Giorgi Gabelaia
5	Edward Tatiani	"Hey You"	Edward Tatiani
6	Boris Bedia	"It's Life"	Boris Bedia
7	Vanilla Cage	"Breaking the Cage"	Levan Kapanadze, Gigi Gogokhia, George Noniashvili
8	REMA	"Feel Me"	Nick Leshchenko, DJ Rock, Kobi Manjgaladze
9	Anri Jokhadze	"I'm a Joker"	Rusudan Chkhaidze, Bibi Kvachadze

== At Eurovision ==
According to Eurovision rules, all nations with the exceptions of the host country and the "Big Five" (France, Germany, Italy, Spain and the United Kingdom) are required to qualify from one of two semi-finals in order to compete for the final; the top ten countries from each semi-final progress to the final. The European Broadcasting Union (EBU) split up the competing countries into six different pots based on voting patterns from previous contests, with countries with favourable voting histories put into the same pot. On 25 January 2012, a special allocation draw was held which placed each country into one of the two semi-finals, as well as which half of the show they would perform in. Georgia was placed into the second semi-final, to be held on 24 May 2012, and was scheduled to perform in the second half of the show. The running order for the semi-finals was decided through another draw on 20 March 2012 and Georgia was set to perform in position 12, following the entry from Sweden and before the entry from Turkey.

Both the semi-finals and the final were broadcast in Georgia on the GPB First Channel with commentary by Temo Kvirkvelia. The Georgian spokesperson, who announced the Georgian votes during the final, was lead singer of 2011 Georgian contest entrant Eldrine, Sopho Toroshelidze.

=== Semi-final ===
Anri Jokhadze took part in technical rehearsals on 16 and 19 May, followed by dress rehearsals on 23 and 24 May. This included the jury final on 23 May where the professional juries of each country watched and voted on the competing entries.

The Georgian performance began with Anri Jokhadze dressed in a red monk habit, of which he later took off to reveal a black and silver outfit designed by Canadian designer Gio Gaudet. Jokhadze was joined on stage by five dancers, all of them which stood and sat on metal-framed cube structures as well as performing backing vocals. One of the backing performers wore a long red dress split up the sides, while the remaining four performers wore black leather basques. Jokhadze also played a Georgian drum and the piano during the performance. The stage colours were predominantly red with the LED screens projecting fast moving stars and circles. The performance also featured smoke and pyrotechnic flame effects. The staging director for the Georgian performance was Lasha Oniani. The five backing performers that joined Anri Jokhadze were: Magda Jokhadze, Nini Shermadini, Nino Dzotsenidze, Salome Chachua and Veriko Turashvili.

At the end of the show, Georgia was not announced among the top 10 entries in the second semi-final and therefore failed to qualify to compete in the final. This marked the first time that Georgia failed to qualify to the final of the Eurovision Song Contest from a semi-final since its first entry in 2007. It was later revealed that Georgia placed fourteenth in the semi-final, receiving a total of 36 points.

=== Voting ===
Voting during the three shows consisted of 50 percent public televoting and 50 percent from a jury deliberation. The jury consisted of five music industry professionals who were citizens of the country they represent. This jury was asked to judge each contestant based on: vocal capacity; the stage performance; the song's composition and originality; and the overall impression by the act. In addition, no member of a national jury could be related in any way to any of the competing acts in such a way that they cannot vote impartially and independently.

Following the release of the full split voting by the EBU after the conclusion of the competition, it was revealed that Georgia had placed eighteenth (last) with the public televote and eighth with the jury vote in the second semi-final. In the public vote, Georgia scored 15 points, while with the jury vote, Georgia scored 62 points.

Below is a breakdown of points awarded to Georgia and awarded by Georgia in the second semi-final and grand final of the contest. The nation awarded its 12 points to Sweden in the semi-final and to Lithuania in the final of the contest.

==== Points awarded to Georgia ====
Points awarded to Georgia (Semi-final 2)
Score	Country
12 points	Lithuania
10 points	Ukraine
8 points	
7 points	
6 points	Belarus
5 points	
4 points	Estonia
3 points	Turkey
2 points	
1 point	Portugal

==== Points awarded by Georgia ====
Points awarded by Georgia (Semi-final 2)
Score	Country
12 points	Sweden
10 points	Serbia
8 points	Belarus
7 points	Estonia
6 points	Ukraine
5 points	Lithuania
4 points	Malta
3 points	Turkey
2 points	Bosnia and Herzegovina
1 point	Macedonia

Points awarded by Georgia (Final)
Score	Country
12 points	Lithuania
10 points	Azerbaijan
8 points	Sweden
7 points	Turkey
6 points	Ukraine
5 points	Russia
4 points	Italy
3 points	Albania
2 points	Germany
1 point	Greece
