= Bosnia and Herzegovina in the Eurovision Song Contest 2012 =

- Eurovision Song Contest 2012
- Country: Bosnia and Herzegovina
- Selection process: Internal selection
- Announcement date: Artist: 15 December 2011; Song: 15 March 2012

Competing entry
- Song: "Korake ti znam"
- Artist: Maya Sar
- Songwriters: Maya Sar

Placement
- Semi-final result: Qualified (6th, 77 points)
- Final result: 18th, 55 points

Participation chronology

Bosnia and Herzegovina was represented at the Eurovision Song Contest 2012 with the song "Korake ti znam" written and performed by Maya Sar. On 15 December 2011, the Bosnian broadcaster Radio and Television of Bosnia and Herzegovina (BHRT) revealed that they had internally selected Maya Sar to compete at the 2012 contest in Baku, Azerbaijan. Her song, "Korake ti znam", was presented to the public during a show on 15 March 2012.

Bosnia and Herzegovina was drawn to compete in the second semi-final of the Eurovision Song Contest which took place on 24 May 2012. Performing during the show in position 17, "Korake ti znam" was announced among the top 10 entries of the second semi-final and therefore qualified to compete in the final on 26 May. It was later revealed that Bosnia and Herzegovina placed sixth out of the 18 participating countries in the semi-final with 77 points. In the final, Bosnia and Herzegovina performed in position 5 and placed eighteenth out of the 26 participating countries, scoring 55 points.

== Background ==
Prior to the 2012 contest, Bosnia and Herzegovina had participated in the Eurovision Song Contest seventeen times since its first entry in 1993. The nation's best placing in the contest was third, which it achieved in 2006 with the song "Lejla" performed by Hari Mata Hari. Following the introduction of semi-finals for the 2004 contest, Bosnia and Herzegovina has, up to this year, managed to qualify on each occasion the nation has participated and compete in the final. Bosnia and Herzegovina's least successful result has been 22nd place, which they have achieved in 1996.

The Bosnian national broadcaster, Radio and Television of Bosnia and Herzegovina (BHRT), broadcasts the event within Bosnia and Herzegovina and organises the selection process for the nation's entry. BHRT confirmed their intentions to participate at the 2012 Eurovision Song Contest on 9 December 2011. The broadcaster had selected the Bosnian entry through an internal selection process since 2006, a selection procedure that was continued for their 2012 entry.

== Before Eurovision ==
=== Internal selection ===
On 15 December 2011, the broadcaster announced that they had internally selected Maya Sar to represent Bosnia and Herzegovina in Baku. The song "Korake ti znam", written by Maya Sar herself was announced on 16 February 2012 as the song to be performed at the contest, which was also selected internally. "Korake ti znam" was presented during a television special on 15 March 2012, which was held at the Hotel Europe in Sarajevo and hosted by Ajdin Tači. The show was broadcast on BHT 1 and BH Radio 1 as well as streamed online via the broadcaster's website bhrt.ba and the official Eurovision Song Contest website eurovision.tv. In addition to the presentation of the song, the show featured guest performances by 1964 Yugoslav Eurovision entrant Sabahudin Kurt, 2004 Bosnian Eurovision entrant Deen and 2007 Bosnian Eurovision entrant Marija Šestić as well as a guest appearance by 2008 Bosnian Eurovision entrant Laka. A Bosnian language version, English language version and Italian language version of the song were prepared, however the song was performed in Bosnian at the Eurovision Song Contest.

=== Promotion ===
Maya Sar made several appearances across Europe to specifically promote "Korake ti znam" as the Bosnian Eurovision entry. On 18 February, Maya Sar performed during the presentation show of the 2012 Croatian Eurovision entry, Dora 2012 - Idemo na Eurosong s Ninom!, which was held at the Anton Marti Studio in Zagreb, Croatia. On 28 April, Maya Sar made several television and radio appearances in Serbia including performances during programmes on RTS, RTV Pink, Prvoj TV and Radio Belgrade. On 8 May, Maya Sar appeared as a guest in the 24sata TV programme Bez Ograde in Croatia.

== At Eurovision ==
According to Eurovision rules, all nations with the exceptions of the host country and the "Big Five" (France, Germany, Italy, Spain and the United Kingdom) are required to qualify from one of two semi-finals in order to compete for the final; the top ten countries from each semi-final progress to the final. The European Broadcasting Union (EBU) split up the competing countries into six different pots based on voting patterns from previous contests, with countries with favourable voting histories put into the same pot. On 25 January 2012, a special allocation draw was held which placed each country into one of the two semi-finals, as well as which half of the show they would perform in. Bosnia and Herzegovina was placed into the first semi-final, to be held on 22 May 2012, and was scheduled to perform in the second half of the show. The running order for the semi-finals was decided through another draw on 20 March 2012 and Bosnia and Herzegovina was set to perform in position 17, following the entry from Norway and before the entry from Lithuania.

The two semi-finals and the final were broadcast in Bosnia and Herzegovina on BHT 1 with commentary by Dejan Kukrić. The Bosnian spokesperson, who announced the Bosnian votes during the final, was Laka who represented Bosnia and Herzegovina in the Eurovision Song Contest 2008.

=== Semi-final ===
Maya Sar took part in technical rehearsals on 16 and 20 May, followed by dress rehearsals on 9 and 10 May. This included the jury show on 9 May where the professional juries of each country watched and voted on the competing entries.

The Bosnian performance featured Maya Sar in a black dress with raised shoulder pads designed by Selma Starfinger and jewelry. The performance began with Sar seated on a piano, of which she got up towards the end of the song to the front of the stage. The stage lighting transitioned from soft white, purple, red and blue colours to a sunset style colour with medieval archways being displayed on the LED screens. The creative director for the Bosnian performance was Ahmed Imamović.

At the end of the show, Bosnia and Herzegovina was announced as having finished in the top 10 and subsequently qualifying for the grand final. It was later revealed that Bosnia and Herzegovina placed sixth in the semi-final, receiving a total of 77 points.

=== Final ===
Shortly after the second semi-final, a winners' press conference was held for the ten qualifying countries. As part of this press conference, the qualifying artists took part in a draw to determine the running order for the final. This draw was done in the order the countries appeared in the semi-final running order. Bosnia and Herzegovina was drawn to perform in position 5, following the entry from Lithuania and before the entry from Russia.

Maya Sar once again took part in dress rehearsals on 25 and 26 May before the final, including the jury final where the professional juries cast their final votes before the live show. Maya Sar performed a repeat of her semi-final performance during the final on 26 May. Bosnia and Herzegovina placed eighteenth in the final, scoring 55 points.

=== Voting ===
Voting during the three shows involved each country awarding points from 1-8, 10 and 12 as determined by a combination of 50% national jury and 50% televoting. Each nation's jury consisted of five music industry professionals who are citizens of the country they represent. This jury judged each entry based on: vocal capacity; the stage performance; the song's composition and originality; and the overall impression by the act. In addition, no member of a national jury was permitted to be related in any way to any of the competing acts in such a way that they cannot vote impartially and independently.

Following the release of the full split voting by the EBU after the conclusion of the competition, it was revealed that Bosnia and Herzegovina had placed sixteenth with the public televote and fifteenth with the jury vote in the final. In the public vote, Bosnia and Herzegovina scored 57 points, while with the jury vote, Bosnia and Herzegovina scored 71 points. In the second semi-final, Bosnia and Herzegovina placed seventh with the public televote with 70 points and sixth with the jury vote, scoring 77 points.

Below is a breakdown of points awarded to Bosnia and Herzegovina and awarded by Bosnia and Herzegovina in the second semi-final and grand final of the contest. The nation awarded its 12 points to Croatia in the semi-final and to Macedonia in the final of the contest.

==== Points awarded to Bosnia and Herzegovina ====
Points awarded to Bosnia and Herzegovina (Semi-final 2)
Score	Country
12 points	Croatia; Turkey
10 points	
8 points	
7 points	
6 points	Slovakia
5 points	Germany; Macedonia; Netherlands; Portugal; Serbia; Slovenia; Sweden
4 points	France; Norway
3 points	
2 points	Georgia
1 point	Bulgaria; United Kingdom

Points awarded to Bosnia and Herzegovina (Final)
Score	Country
12 points	
10 points	Croatia; Turkey
8 points	
7 points	Austria; Macedonia; Slovenia
6 points	Montenegro
5 points	Serbia
4 points	
3 points	
2 points	Slovakia
1 point	Switzerland

==== Points awarded by Bosnia and Herzegovina ====
Points awarded by Bosnia and Herzegovina (Semi-final 2)
Score	Country
12 points	Croatia
10 points	Serbia
8 points	Macedonia
7 points	Sweden
6 points	Turkey
5 points	Slovenia
4 points	Portugal
3 points	Bulgaria
2 points	Ukraine
1 point	Norway

Points awarded by Bosnia and Herzegovina (Final)
Score	Country
12 points	Macedonia
10 points	Serbia
8 points	Sweden
7 points	Azerbaijan
6 points	Albania
5 points	Spain
4 points	Turkey
3 points	Russia
2 points	France
1 point	Greece

=== Jury points awarded by Bosnia and Herzegovina ===
Jury points awarded by Bosnia and Herzegovina (Semi-final 2)
Score	Country
12 points	Croatia
10 points	Sweden
8 points	Macedonia
7 points	Serbia
6 points	Bulgaria
5 points	Ukraine
4 points	Portugal
3 points	Malta
2 points	Turkey
1 point	Slovenia

Jury points awarded by Bosnia and Herzegovina (final)
Score	Country
12 points	Macedonia
10 points	Sweden
8 points	Albania
7 points	Spain
6 points	Serbia
5 points	France
4 points	Azerbaijan
3 points	Ukraine
2 points	Estonia
1 point	Iceland
