= Kaliopi =

Macedonian musical artist (born 1966)

Kaliopi Калиопи
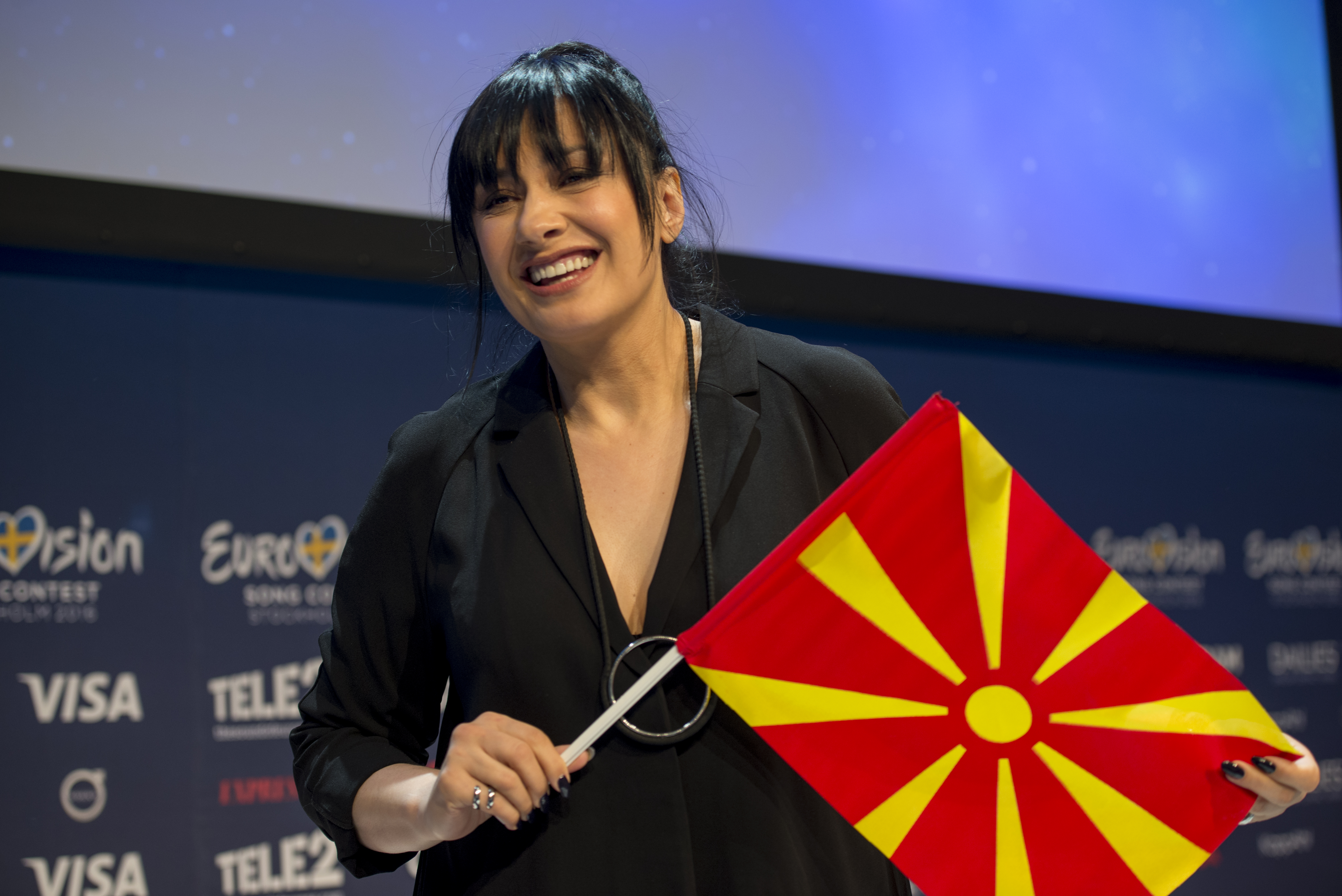

Background information
- Born: Kaliopi Bukleska; 28 December 1966 (age 59); Ohrid, SR Macedonia, SFR Yugoslavia
- Genres: Pop rock; opera
- Occupations: Singer; songwriter
- Instruments: Vocals; piano
- Years active: 1976–present
- Labels: Kaliopi Music Production; Hayat Production; Hit Records; City Records
- Website: www.kaliopi.com.mk

Kaliopi Bukle (Macedonian: Калиопи Букле, pronounced [kaliˈɔpi ˈbuklɛ]; born 28 December 1966 as Kaliopi Bukleska (Macedonian: Калиопи Буклеска)), known professionally as Kaliopi, is a Macedonian singer-songwriter. In her career, Kaliopi has progressed from singing lead vocal with her eponymous band in 1980s Yugoslavia to being an established vocalist and composer working in North Macedonia and across former Yugoslavia. She represented Macedonia twice in the Eurovision Song Contest, first in 2012 in Baku, Azerbaijan with "Crno i belo" and a second time in 2016 in Stockholm, Sweden with the song "Dona".

== Biography ==
=== Early life and career beginnings ===
Kaliopi was born into a mixed Aromanian–Macedonian family in Ohrid and raised up in Kičevo. She showed interest in music at a young age. In 1976, she entered a Macedonian children's festival called "Zlatno Slavejče", which she won with the song "Mojata učitelka". She later toured with the choir of Zapro Zaprov "Razvigorče", performing in Czechoslovakia, Slovenia (then within Yugoslavia) and Austria between 1978 and 1980. She then joined the class of Marija Nikolovska, where she studied solo singing for four years, before continuing her training at the Music Academy in the class of Blagoja Nikolovski in 1984. Kaliopi competed in the 1984 Yugoslavian solo singing contest, finishing in third place and competing as the youngest classical music singer at the festival.

=== Band formation, Kaliopi and Rodjeni ===
In 1984, Kaliopi founded the band "Kaliopi" with Romeo Grill, recording their first two songs, "Tomi" and "Nemoj da me budis" at the request of Macedonian Radio. The band won best interpretation for the song "Leo" at the Festival Opatija, an award voted for by the journalists of Yugoslavia. In 1986, the band released their eponymous debut album on the ZKP RTLJ record label. In the same year, they participated in the Split Festival, where they won the best debut performer award for their song "Da more zna".

In 1987, the band released their second album, "Rodjeni", which was recorded in Zagreb and was highly successful, producing the hit song "Rodjeni (Bato)" created by the author Romeo Grill. The band was active in the music scene, performing at festivals, recording television specials for TV Zagreb, TV Belgrade, TV Sarajevo and TV Titograd and performing a concert tour that included performances in the Soviet Union. At the height of the band's popularity, Kaliopi and Romeo Grill moved to Switzerland. After an extended absence from the music scene, followed by the breakup of Yugoslavia, the band was officially dissolved.

=== Solo comeback, Oboi me and Ako denot mi e nokj ===
Kaliopi returned to the music scene as a solo performer in the Republic of Macedonia and competed at the 1996 edition of Skopje Fest, the national selection for the Eurovision Song Contest 1996. With the song "Samo ti", she was awarded first place by the jury and the audience, winning the right to be the first representative for Macedonia at the Eurovision Song Contest. However, the 1996 Contest saw an influx of new participants and at a non-televised audio pre-selection, Macedonia was eliminated from the Contest, getting only 14 points, and coming 26th out of 29 participants. Kaliopi later competed in Skopje Fest 1998, but only managed ninth place with the song "Ne zaboravaj".

Kaliopi began re-establishing herself in the music scene of Macedonia, composing songs for other artists and releasing her solo debut album, "Oboi me" in December 1999. The album was promoted via a television special broadcast on MRT, single releases for the songs "Oboi me" and "Daj da pijam" and a promotional tour in summer 2000. The album was the last collaboration with her former bandmate Romeo Grill until 2012. In 2000, Kaliopi established her own record label Kaliopi Music Production, which exclusively dealt with her releases in Macedonia.

In January 2001, Kaliopi announced the release of a new album and a new collaboration with producer Darko Dimitrov. The album's title track "Ako denot mi e nokj" was the first single release; this was followed by the release of "Na pat do Makedonija", "Dali me sakas", "Mesecina" and "Za samo eden den". The album was promoted through a television documentary titled "Kaliopi Again" on MRT, an unplugged concert at the ancient Heraclea Lyncestis amphitheatre in Bitola and the "Na pat do Makedonija" concert tour, which commenced in November 2001 and included eleven concert dates across Macedonia.

On 16 February 2002, Kaliopi took part in Skopje Fest 2002 as a composer and a backing vocalist for the song "Pesna za nas", which was performed by Gorgi Krstevski. The song placed fifth in the competition. In July 2002, Kaliopi released the single "Najmila", which was one of two new songs featured on the October release of the live album "Najmila: Kaliopi Live and Unreleased". Kaliopi released "Zasluzena Zemja" as the follow-up single from the album.

=== Ne mi go zemaj vremeto and 30 year jubilee ===
In 2003, Kaliopi released the title track from her third album, "Ne mi go zemaj vremeto", as the first single. The album was released in December 2003 and featured the duets "Bel den" with Macedonian Romani singer Esma Redžepova and "Purpurni dozdovi" with Macedonian actor Vasil Zafirchev. The album produced the radio hits "Za kogo postojam", "Toa sum jas", "Dari dari dam" and "Koga prokleto ti trebam" during 2004 and 2005. This was also the first solo album to feature songs in the Serbo-Croatian language and it also included Kaliopi's first single aimed at the ex-Yugoslavian market titled "Smeh". In 2004, Kaliopi played the lead in the first Macedonian musical, titled "Cija si".

In November 2004, along with five other artists, Kaliopi was selected for the Macedonia pre-selection for the Eurovision Song Contest 2005. She opted out of the selection in the initial stages after learning that the process would be competition based rather than an internal selection. However, she still remained part of the competition as a composer, supplying selection finalist Aleksandra Pileva with the song "Ne", which ultimately placed third.

In early 2006, Kaliopi released the single "1000 Bozji Cvetovi", which garnered media interest because it was billed as a duet with Kaliopi herself. On 4 March 2006, she competed in the Macedonia national selection for the Eurovision Song Contest 2006 with the song "Silna". Despite the media labelling her one of the favourites to win, the song was placed sixth. It was later remixed and used in a promotional campaign in Macedonia for the Škoda Octavia. On 12 July 2006, Kaliopi performed at the Montenegrin festival Suncane Skale with the Serbian version of the song "Silna" and was placed third. She later released a non-album radio single titled "Zivotot e džabe". Kaliopi was featured on Croatian singer Massimo Savić's album as a composer and a singer, performing the song "Melankolija". In late 2006, Kaliopi celebrated her 30-year jubilee as an artist, performing at a huge concert at the Universal Hall in Skopje. She performed her greatest hits and was joined by Esma Redžepova and Edin Karamazov. The concert later received a video release.

=== International career and Želim ti reći ===
With increased exposure in Croatia, Kaliopi signed a record deal with Aquarius Records and released her first single, "Probudi me", in Croatia in 2007. The release was followed by a compilation album, "The Best of", which was also released in Croatia. In May 2007, Kaliopi released the single "Grev", which she composed as the theme for the film Elegija za tebe. In November 2007, Kaliopi was a judge and a guest performer at the Albanian music event Kënga Magjike. She received critical praise for her performance of "Ako denot mi e nokj", which she dedicated to the late Toše Proeski, who had been involved in a tragic accident just a month earlier.

In 2008, Kaliopi released the Serbo-Croatian language album "Želim ti reći", promoting it with the singles "Ljubi" and the title track "Želim ti reći". In late June, Kaliopi competed at the Montenegrin festival Pjesma Mediterana in Budva as a performer of the song "Reci mi" and as the composer of the song "Dajem ti sve", which was performed by Tamara Todevska. On 6 July 2008, Kaliopi participated at the 48th edition of the Split Festival, performing the song "Za tebe čuvam sebe", which was written by Croatian singer Alka Vuica. On the 5 October 2008, Kaliopi was part of the memorial tribute concert honouring the anniversary of Toše Proeski's last concert during which she performed his song "Nemas ni blagodaram".

Kaliopi participated in several festivals across ex-Yugoslavia in 2009: performing "Ljubičice" at the Croatian Radio Festival, winning best interpretation for the performance of "Meni je ime" at Pjesma Mediterana, winning Suncane Skale 2009 with Naum Petreski with the song "Rum dum dum" and performing "Stine" at the Runjićeve večeri in Croatia.

=== Oblivion and Poraka ===
In November 2009, Kaliopi released the album "Oblivion", a collaborative work with Edin Karamazov which featured 11 world-famous songs performed in nine languages with musical arrangements for the baroque lute and guitar. The album was promoted with concerts across the ex-Yugoslavian region in 2010, including performances at the National Opera and Ballet in Skopje, the 15th International Cultural Manifestation Zeničko proljeće in Zenica and the Kastav Summer Festival in Kastav. Kaliopi previously appeared on Edin Karamazov's album "The Lute is a Song", where she recorded a version of the old Macedonian song "So maki sum se rodila".

At the end of 2009 and throughout 2010, Kaliopi participated in several music projects. She recorded the song "Nevinost" as part of "Miligram", an ex-Yugoslavian compilation album project by composer Aleksandar Milić Mili. Kaliopi also participated in the posthumous release of Toše Proeski's self-composed, unreleased songs, recording the song "Zasekogaš" in Macedonian and "Zauvijek" in Serbo-Croatian. In December 2010, Kaliopi released the album "Poraka", for which she collaborated with Darko Juranović "D'Knock", Tihomir Preradović, Miroslav Rus and Rambo Amadeus. The album contained the duet "Denot si budi" with Slovenian singer Marko Vozelj and "Ako Još Ikad Padne Snijeg" with Edin Karamazov. The Serbo-Croatian version of the album, "Poruka", was released in the ex-Yugoslavian market. The singles "Ti", "Ne sum kako ti" and "Poraka" were released to promote the album.

=== Eurovision Song Contest 2012 ===
On 19 November 2011, MRT invited Kaliopi to represent Macedonia in the Eurovision Song Contest 2012 in Baku, Azerbaijan. Kaliopi performed the song "Crno i belo", with lyrics by Kaliopi and music by Romeo Grill. After a four-year pause, Kaliopi brought Macedonia again into the finals. The song qualified from the second semi-final on 24 May 2012 and was placed thirteenth in the final on 26 May 2012, scoring 71 points. Prior to her Eurovision performance, Kaliopi promoted the song in Serbia, Croatia, Bosnia and Herzegovina, Montenegro, the Netherlands, United Kingdom, Ukraine and Belarus.

The release of "Crno i belo" also marked a renewed cooperation between Kaliopi and Romeo Grill after the twelve-year pause. Their collaboration continued following the Eurovision Song Contest and yielded the album "Melem". Kaliopi released the singles "Vučica", "Melem" and "Mrvica" to promote the album before and after its February 2013 release date.

=== Album Melem and others ===
In 2013 her fans from around the world participated in karaoke competition titled "Kaliopi Fan Festival". The online festival focused on the social networks within which audience voted and selected the best video cover for some of the songs from the album "Melem".

In the spring of 2015, Kaliopi released a new single called "Mojot Dom", and shortly thereafter, the single "Poželi". In the fall of 2015 she released the acoustic ballad "Jutro".

=== Eurovision Song Contest 2016 ===
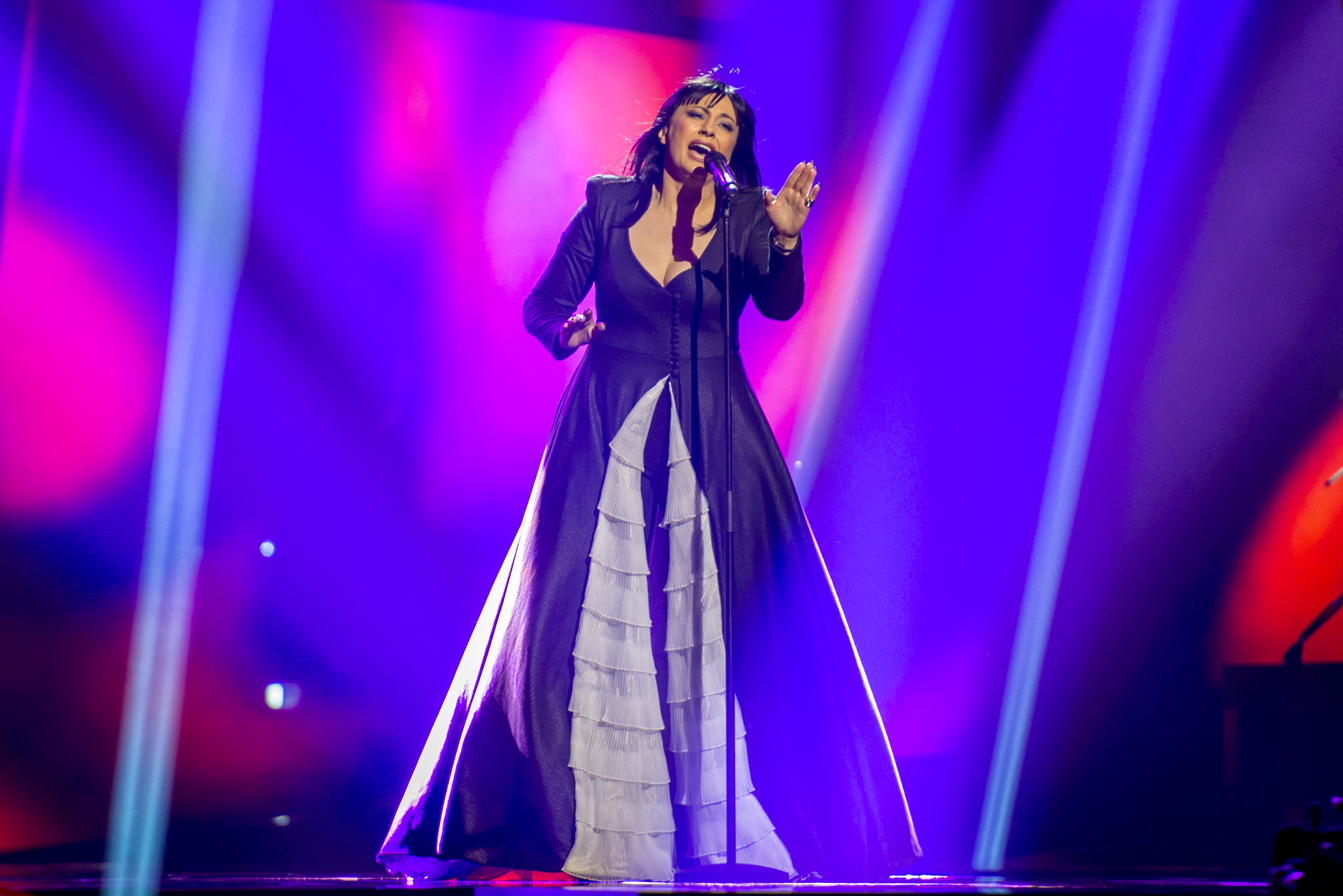
Kaliopi representing Macedonia in the Eurovision Song Contest 2016.

On 24 November 2015, MRT announced that they selected Kaliopi to represent Macedonia at the Eurovision Song Contest 2016 in Stockholm. with the song "Dona" (Дона), released on 7 March 2016. Kaliopi performed the song on 12 May 2016, during the second semi-final of Eurovision, but failed to qualify to the 14 May final, reaching 11th place in her semi-final.

== In popular culture ==
=== Macedonian Idol ===
For the majority of 2011, Kaliopi was part of the judging panel for the first edition of Macedonian Idol alongside fellow judges Igor Džambazov and Toni Mihajlovski. Kaliopi released the songs "Ne e kraj na se" and "Se rodi den" with the finalists of the show:

== Discography ==
Studio albums

with Group Kaliopi

- 1986: "Kaliopi"
- 1987: "Rodjeni"

Solo

- 2000: "Oboi Me"
- 2001: "Ako Denot Mi E Nokj"
- 2004: "Ne Mi Go Zemaj Vremeto"
- 2008: "Zelim Ti Reci"
- 2010: "Poraka" and "Poruka"
- 2013: "Melem"
- 2024: "Album"

with Edin Karamazov

- 2009: "Oblivion"

Live albums

- 2002: "Najmila – Live and Unreleased"
- 2006: "Kaliopi Live" (DVD Album)

Instrumental albums

- 2005: "Me, Isadora"

Compilation albums

- 2007: "The Best Of"

== Awards and achievements ==
- Festival Opatija accredited journalists award for best interpretation 1985
- "Ekran "award, Best pop singer in Yugoslavia and Macedonia, 1986
- Award of Yugoslavia, 1987
- Radio Skopje award for most popular person in 2001
- "Vecer" award, most famous TV face, 1985, 1986
- "Mlad Borec" award, 1986
- "Nova Makedonija" award, Best Artist, 1986
- Golden Ladybug of Popularity – Singer of the year, 1999, 2001, 2002, 2004, 2010, 2012
- Golden Ladybug of Popularity – Hit of the year, "Dali me sakas", 2001
- Golden Ladybug of Popularity – Hit of the year, "Crno i belo", 2012
- Golden Ladybug of Popularity – Album of the year, "Ako denot mi e nokj", 2001
- Golden Ladybug of Popularity – Album of the year, "Poraka", 2010
- Golden Ladybug of Popularity – Lyricist of the year, "Na pat do Makedonija", 2001
- 12 Veličestveni – Best Album and Best Singer, 1999, 2000
- 12 Veličestveni – Best Album, Best Singer and Best Composer, 2001
- Indexi Award – Female Vocalist of the year, 2009
- BH Music Oscar of Popularity – Best Female Artist, 2010
- Suncane Skale Prince Award – Best Festival Performance, 2009
- Kënga Magjike – Winning composer for the song "Njëri Nga Ata" performed by Jonida Maliqi, 2008
- Awarded with the statue of Mother Teresa, 2004
- President of the Macedonian Association of Music Works Authors – Shpato, 2004
- Honorary Art Ambassador of the Macedonian Economy in the World, 2005
- President of the ZAMP Assembly – Republic of Macedonia, 2005
- Member of MRTV council, 2006
- Honorary Ambassador of UNHCR for the Republic of Macedonia
- "Carina Teodora" award, Serbia, 2008
- Grand-Prix for Music Career, "13 for the Most Successful" in Struga, 2006
- "Davorin Popović Award" for Best Performance at Pjesma Mediterana, 2009
- "Count Cikulin" Award for the Concert at Castle Luznica in Zapresic, June 2010
- Awarded as most successful female manager for 2009 at the traditional "Contest of 10 most successful female managers from Republic of Macedonia", 2009
- MPX award for special merits in the development of music in the region, at the 5th Bosnian Radio Television Festival, December 2010
- Award for special merits in the development and affirmation of Macedonian music in the country and outside its borders, at the 3rd Macedonian Radio Festival, December 2010

== See also ==
- Music of North Macedonia
- SFR Yugoslav Pop and Rock scene
- Macedonia in the Eurovision Song Contest 2012
- Macedonia in the Eurovision Song Contest 2016

Awards and achievements
Preceded by Aleksandra Bučevac	Sunčane Skale winner with Naum Peterski; 2009	Succeeded by Dado Topić & Anita Popović
Preceded by Vlatko Ilievski with "Rusinka"	Macedonia in the Eurovision Song Contest; 2012	Succeeded by Vlatko Lozanoski & Esma Redžepova with "Pred da se razdeni"
Preceded by Daniel Kajmakoski with "Autumn Leaves"	Macedonia in the Eurovision Song Contest; 2016	Succeeded by Jana Burčeska with "Dance Alone"
