= Ako Denot Mi E Nokj =

Ako Denot Mi E Nokj Ако Денот Ми Е Ноќ
- Ako Denot Mi E Nokj album cover

Studio album by Kaliopi
- Released: June 2001 (Republic of Macedonia)
- Recorded: 2000–2001
- Genre: Pop
- Label: KMP Kaliopi Music Production
- Producer: Darko Dimitrov

Kaliopi chronology
| Oboi Me (2000) | Ako Denot Mi E Nokj; Ако Денот Ми Е Ноќ (2001) | Najmila (2002) |

Singles from Ako Denot Mi E Nokj
- 1. "Ako Denot Mi E Nokj" Released: December 2000; 2. "Dali me sakaš" Released: September 2000; 3. "Kraj" Released: August 2000; 4. "Mesečina" Released: Juli 2000; 5. "Kako solza" Released: July 2000; 6. "Za samo eden den" Released: April 2000; 7. "Na pat do Makedonija" Released: October 2000; 8. "Imam – nemam" Released: September 2000; 9. "Ovoj cuden svet" Released: November 2000; 10. "Jas znam" Released: July 1998

Ako Denot Mi E Nokj (in Macedonian: Ако Денот Ми Е Ноќ, If Daylight is My Night) is the second solo album by the Macedonian singer Kaliopi.

== Background and production history ==
In January 2001 Kaliopi officially announced that for her next album she will cooperate with Darko Dimitrov, with the release of the single and music video for the song "Ako Denot Mi E Nokj".

== Production history ==
All songs are written and composed by Kaliopi and the album is arranged and produced by Darko Dimitrov. Guests on this album are Stojan Dimov – sax ('Ako denot mi e nok' and 'Imam – nemam') and clarinet ('Za samo eden den'); Goce Dimitrovski – trumpet ('Dali me sakas' and 'Imam – nemam'); Edin Karamazov – guitar ('Mesecina'), altaj, kanon ('Za samo eden den'); Darko, Aleksandra, Ema and Ana – vocals ('Mesecina')

== Track listings ==
1. "Ako denot mi e nokj" (3:34)
  music: Kaliopi Bukle
  arrangement: D.Dimitrov
  lyrics: Kaliopi
2. "Dali me sakas" (3:21)
  music: Kaliopi
  arrangement: D.Dimitrov
  lyrics: Kaliopi
3. "Kraj" (3:16)
  music: Kaliopi
  arrangement: D.Dimitrov
  lyrics: Kaliopi
4. "Mesecina" (4:27)
  music: Kaliopi
  arrangement: D.Dimitrov
  lyrics: Kaliopi
5. "Kako solza" (3:16)
  music: Kaliopi
  arrangement: D.Dimitrov
  lyrics: Kaliopi
6. "Za samo eden den" (3:23)
  music: Kaliopi
  arrangement: D.Dimitrov
  lyrics: Kaliopi
7. "Na pat do Makedonija" (3:46)
  music: Kaliopi
  arrangement: D.Dimitrov
  lyrics: Kaliopi
8. "Imam – nemam" (3:16)
  music: Kaliopi
  arrangement: D.Dimitrov
  lyrics: Kaliopi
9. "Ovoj cuden svet" (3:21)
  music: Kaliopi
  arrangement: D.Dimitrov
  lyrics: Kaliopi
10. "Jas znam" (4:17)
  music: Kaliopi
  arrangement: D.Dimitrov
  lyrics: Kaliopi
