= Eurovision Song Contest 2012 =

International song competition

Coordinates: 40.3442°N 49.8502°E

- Light Your Fire!

Dates and venue
- Semi-final 1: 22 May 2012
- Semi-final 2: 24 May 2012
- Final: 26 May 2012
- Venue: Baku Crystal Hall; Baku, Azerbaijan

Organisation
- Organiser: European Broadcasting Union (EBU)
- Executive supervisor: Jon Ola Sand

Production
- Host broadcaster: İctimai Television (İTV)
- Director: Ladislaus Kiraly
- Executive producer: Adil Kerimli
- Presenters: Leyla Aliyeva Quliyeva; Eldar Gasimov; Nargiz Birk-Petersen

Participants
- Number of entries: 42
- Number of finalists: 26
- Returning countries: Montenegro
- Non-returning countries: Armenia; Poland
- Participation map: Finalist countries Countries eliminated in the semi-finals Countries that participated in the past but not in 2012

Vote
- Voting system: Each country awarded 12, 10, 8–1 points to their 10 favourite songs.
- Winning song: Sweden; "Euphoria"

The Eurovision Song Contest 2012 was the 57th edition of the Eurovision Song Contest. It consisted of two semi-finals on 22 and 24 May and a final on 26 May 2012, held at the Baku Crystal Hall in Baku, Azerbaijan, and presented by Leyla Aliyeva, Nargiz Birk-Petersen, and Eldar Gasimov. It was organised by the European Broadcasting Union (EBU) and host broadcaster İctimai Television (İTV), which staged the event after winning the 2011 contest for Azerbaijan with the song "Running Scared" by Gasimov himself and Nigar Jamal as Ell and Nikki. It was the first time the contest was hosted in Azerbaijan – only four years after the country made its debut.

Broadcasters from forty-two countries participated in the contest. Montenegro returned to the contest for the first time since 2009. Meanwhile, Armenia withdrew due to security concerns in relation to the ongoing Nagorno-Karabakh conflict with Azerbaijan, while Poland did not participate due to financial concerns.

The winner was Sweden with the song "Euphoria", performed by Loreen and written by Thomas G:son and Peter Boström. The song won both the jury vote and televote and received 372 points out of a maximum of 492. Russia, Serbia, Azerbaijan, and Albania rounded out the top five, with Albania achieving their best result to date. Out of the "Big Five" countries, Germany, Italy and Spain all managed to rank within the top 10, finishing eighth, ninth and tenth, respectively.

The lead-up to the contest was met with political concerns and protests surrounding the host country, including its human rights record and allegations by advocacy groups that Baku was carrying out forced evictions in the construction of the contest's venue.

== Location ==
Baku Crystal Hall, Baku - host venue of the 2012 contest.

Locations of the suggested venues in Baku, Azerbaijan: the chosen venue is marked in blue, while eliminated venues are marked in red

Azerbaijani broadcaster İctimai Television (İTV) got the right to host the 2012 edition of the Eurovision Song Contest after winning the previous edition with the song "Running Scared" performed by Ell and Nikki. Baku, the capital and largest city of Azerbaijan, as well as the largest city on the Caspian Sea and of the Caucasus region, was named the host city for the contest, with the venue being the Baku Crystal Hall, built a few months prior to the contest on the city's coastline.

Shortly after Azerbaijan's victory at the 2011 edition, officials announced that a new 23,000-seat concert venue was to be built near National Flag Square in Baku, as a potential venue for the event. Three days later, other venue options were revealed by organisers, such as the 37,000-seat Tofiq Bahramov Stadium and the Heydar Aliyev Sports and Exhibition Complex. On 2 August 2011, Alpine Bau Deutschland AG was awarded the contract to construct the Baku Crystal Hall. Preparations for construction began in the area shortly after the announcement. Even though the full cost of the contract was not named, the government allocated 6 million AZN for the construction of the venue.

On 8 September 2011, Azad Azerbaijan TV (ATV) reported that Baku Crystal Hall would be the venue of the contest, but no formal confirmation was made at the time neither by İTV nor the European Broadcasting Union (EBU). On 31 October 2011, Ismayil Omarov, the director general of İTV announced that a decision on the venue choice would be taken by the steering committee in January 2012. On 25 January 2012, it was confirmed that the Baku Crystal Hall would be the venue of the contest. Even though the venue had an extended capacity of 23,000 people, only 16,000 people were able to attend each show. Tickets for the contest became available online for purchase on 28 February 2012.

== Participants ==
Eurovision Song Contest 2012 – Participation summaries by country
- Albania; ~~Armenia~~; Austria; Azerbaijan; Belarus; Belgium; Bosnia and Herzegovina; Bulgaria; Croatia; Cyprus; Denmark; Estonia; Finland; France; Georgia; Germany; Greece; Hungary; Iceland; Ireland; Israel; Italy; Latvia; Lithuania; Macedonia; Malta; Moldova; Montenegro; Netherlands; Norway; Portugal; Romania; Russia; San Marino; Serbia; Slovakia; Slovenia; Spain; Sweden; Switzerland; Turkey; Ukraine; United Kingdom

On 17 January 2012, the EBU initially announced that forty-three countries would take part in the 2012 contest. The 57th edition saw the return of Montenegro, who was last represented by Andrea Demirović in 2009. Poland decided not to participate, due to the financial burden of the UEFA Euro 2012 (which Poland co-hosted with Ukraine) and the 2012 Summer Olympics. Armenia, who had originally planned to participate, later withdrew their application due to security concerns related to the ongoing Nagorno-Karabakh conflict with Azerbaijan, subsequently reducing the number of participating countries to 42.

Four artists returned in this year's contest. Kaliopi had intended to participate for Macedonia in 1996 with the song "Samo ti", which placed in 26th position in the pre-qualifying round. She would then go on to represent Macedonia in 2016. Jónsi had represented Iceland in 2004 with the song "Heaven", which placed 19th. Željko Joksimović for Serbia, had represented Serbia and Montenegro in 2004 with the song "Lane moje" which placed second, and had co-hosted the 2008 contest with Jovana Janković. Jedward had represented Ireland in 2011, and returned for a second consecutive year, after their 8th-place finish with the song "Lipstick". In addition, Martina Majerle, who represented Slovenia in 2009, returned as a backing vocalist for Slovenia.

Lys Assia, who won the first Eurovision for Switzerland in 1956, entered the song "C'était ma vie", written by Ralph Siegel and Jean Paul Cara, into the 2012 Swiss national selection. The song, however, only came eighth in a closely fought national selection. Assia attended the event in Baku as a guest of honour.

Eurovision Song Contest 2012 participants
Country	Broadcaster	Artist	Song	Language	Songwriter(s)
Albania	RTSH	Rona Nishliu	"Suus"	Albanian	Florent Boshnjaku; Rona Nishliu
Austria	ORF	Trackshittaz	"Woki mit deim Popo"	German (Note: Specifically Mühlviertlerisch, a Central Bavarian dialect spoken in Upper Austria)	Manuel Hoffelner; Lukas Plöchl
Azerbaijan	İTV	Sabina Babayeva	"When the Music Dies"	English	Anders Bagge; Sandra Bjurman; Johan Kronlund; Stefan Örn
Belarus	BTRC	Litesound	"We Are the Heroes"	English	Dmitriy Karyakin; Vladimir Karyakin
Belgium	VRT	Iris	"Would You?"	English	Walter Mannaerts; Jean Bosco Safari; Nina Sampermans
Bosnia and Herzegovina	BHRT	Maya Sar	"Korake ti znam"	Bosnian	Maja Sarihodžić
Bulgaria	BNT	Sofi Marinova	"Love Unlimited"	Bulgarian, Greek	Krum Georgiev; Iasen Kozev; Donka Vasileva
Croatia	HRT	Nina Badrić	"Nebo"	Croatian	Nina Badrić
Cyprus	CyBC	Ivi Adamou	"La La Love"	English	Björn Djupström; Alex Papaconstantinou; Viktor Svensson; Alexandra Zakka
Denmark	DR	Soluna Samay	"Should've Known Better"	English	Isam Bachiri; Chief 1; Remee; Amir Sulaiman
Estonia	ERR	Ott Lepland	"Kuula"	Estonian	Aapo Ilves; Ott Lepland
Finland	Yle	Pernilla	"När jag blundar"	Swedish	Jonas Karlsson
France	France Télévisions	Anggun	"Echo (You and I)"	French, English	Anggun; Jean-Pierre Pilot; William Rousseau
Georgia	GPB	Anri Jokhadze	"I'm a Joker"	English, Georgian	Rusudan Chkhaidze; Bibi Kvachadze
Germany	NDR (Note: On behalf of the German public broadcasting consortium ARD)	Roman Lob	"Standing Still"	English	Jamie Cullum; Wayne Hector; Steve Robson
Greece	ERT	Eleftheria Eleftheriou	"Aphrodisiac"	English	Dajana Lööf; Dimitri Stassos; Mikaela Stenström
Hungary	MTVA	Compact Disco	"Sound of Our Hearts"	English	Behnam Lotfi; Gábor Pál; Attila Sándor; Csaba Walkó
Iceland	RÚV	Greta Salóme and Jónsi	"Never Forget"	English	Greta Salóme
Ireland	RTÉ	Jedward	"Waterline"	English	Nick Jarl; Sharon Vaughn
Israel	IBA	Izabo	"Time"	English, Hebrew	Shiri Hadar; Ran Shem Tov
Italy	RAI	Nina Zilli	"L'amore è femmina (Out of Love)"	English, Italian	Charlie Mason; Frida Molander; Christian Rabb; Kristoffer Sjökvist; Nina Zilli
Latvia	LTV	Anmary	"Beautiful Song"	English	Ivars Makstnieks; Rolands Ūdris
Lithuania	LRT	Donny Montell	"Love Is Blind"	English	Jodie Rose; Brandon Stone
Macedonia	MRT	Kaliopi	"Crno i belo" (Црно и бело)	Macedonian	Romeo Grill; Kaliopi
Malta	PBS	Kurt Calleja	"This Is the Night"	English	Kurt Calleja; Mikael Gunnerås; Johan Jämtberg
Moldova	TRM	Pasha Parfeny	"Lăutar"	English	Alex Brașoveanu; Pasha Parfeni
Montenegro	RTCG	Rambo Amadeus	"Euro Neuro"	English	Rambo Amadeus
Netherlands	TROS	Joan Franka	"You and Me"	English	Joan Franka; Jessica Hoogenboom
Norway	NRK	Tooji	"Stay"	English	Figge Boström; Peter Boström; Tooji
Portugal	RTP	Filipa Sousa	"Vida minha"	Portuguese	Andrej Babić; Carlos Coelho
Romania	TVR	Mandinga	"Zaleilah"	Spanish, English	Elena Ionescu; Costi Ioniță; Omar Secada
Russia	RTR	Buranovskiye Babushki	"Party for Everybody"	Udmurt, English	Mary S. Applegate; Viktor Drobysh; Timofei Leontiev; Olga Tuktaryova
San Marino	SMRTV	Valentina Monetta	"The Social Network Song (Oh Oh – Uh – Oh Oh)"	English	José Juan Santana Rodriguez; Ralph Siegel; Timothy Touchton
Serbia	RTS	Željko Joksimović	"Nije ljubav stvar" (Није љубав ствар)	Serbian	Željko Joksimović; Miloš Roganović; Marina Tucaković
Slovakia	RTVS	Max Jason Mai	"Don't Close Your Eyes"	English	Max Jason Mai
Slovenia	RTVSLO	Eva Boto	"Verjamem"	Slovene	Vladimir Graić; Igor Pirkovič; Hari Varešanović
Spain	RTVE	Pastora Soler	"Quédate conmigo"	Spanish	Erik Bernholm; Thomas G:son; Antonio Sánchez
Sweden	SVT	Loreen	"Euphoria"	English	Peter Boström; Thomas G:son
Switzerland	SRG SSR	Sinplus	"Unbreakable"	English	Gabriel Broggini; Ivan Broggini
Turkey	TRT	Can Bonomo	"Love Me Back"	English	Can Bonomo
Ukraine	NTU	Gaitana	"Be My Guest"	English	Gaitana; Kiwi Project
United Kingdom	BBC	Engelbert Humperdinck	"Love Will Set You Free"	English	Sacha Skarbek; Martin Terefe

=== Languages ===
The Finnish entry, "När jag blundar", sung by Pernilla Karlsson, was only Finland's second entry in Swedish (after "Fri?" by Beat in 1990) and the first entry at all to be sung in Swedish since 1998. Russia's entry, "Party for Everybody", sung by Buranovskiye Babushki, was the first entry ever to be performed in Udmurt. The Georgian entry, "I'm a Joker" was the first Eurovision entry containing the Georgian language while the Bulgarian song "Love Unlimited" had a few words in the Azerbaijani language, both of whom never appeared at the contest before.

=== Other countries ===
==== Active EBU members ====
- Armenia – On 7 March 2012, the EBU announced that Armenian broadcaster ARMTV had decided to withdraw despite originally being included in the list of participating countries, after Azerbaijani president Ilham Aliyev had given a speech the previous week calling "Armenians of the world" one of Azerbaijan's "main enemies". Armenia was consequently fined by the EBU and was expected to face further penalties, such as exclusion from participation in future contests if it failed to comply with the EBU requirements. Armenia had been in a continuous state of war with Azerbaijan since the early 1990s due to the Nagorno-Karabakh conflict.

Active EBU member broadcasters in Andorra, Czech Republic, Luxembourg and Poland confirmed non-participation prior to the announcement of the participants list by the EBU. The Monegasque and Moroccan broadcasters did the same, despite previous speculations of a possible return.

==== Non-EBU member ====
On 26 November 2011, it was reported that two official EBU documents showed that Liechtenstein's only national broadcaster 1FLTV was being granted active EBU membership, sparking speculations of a debut for the nation. However, it was clarified a few days later that these documents contained editing mistakes.

== Format ==
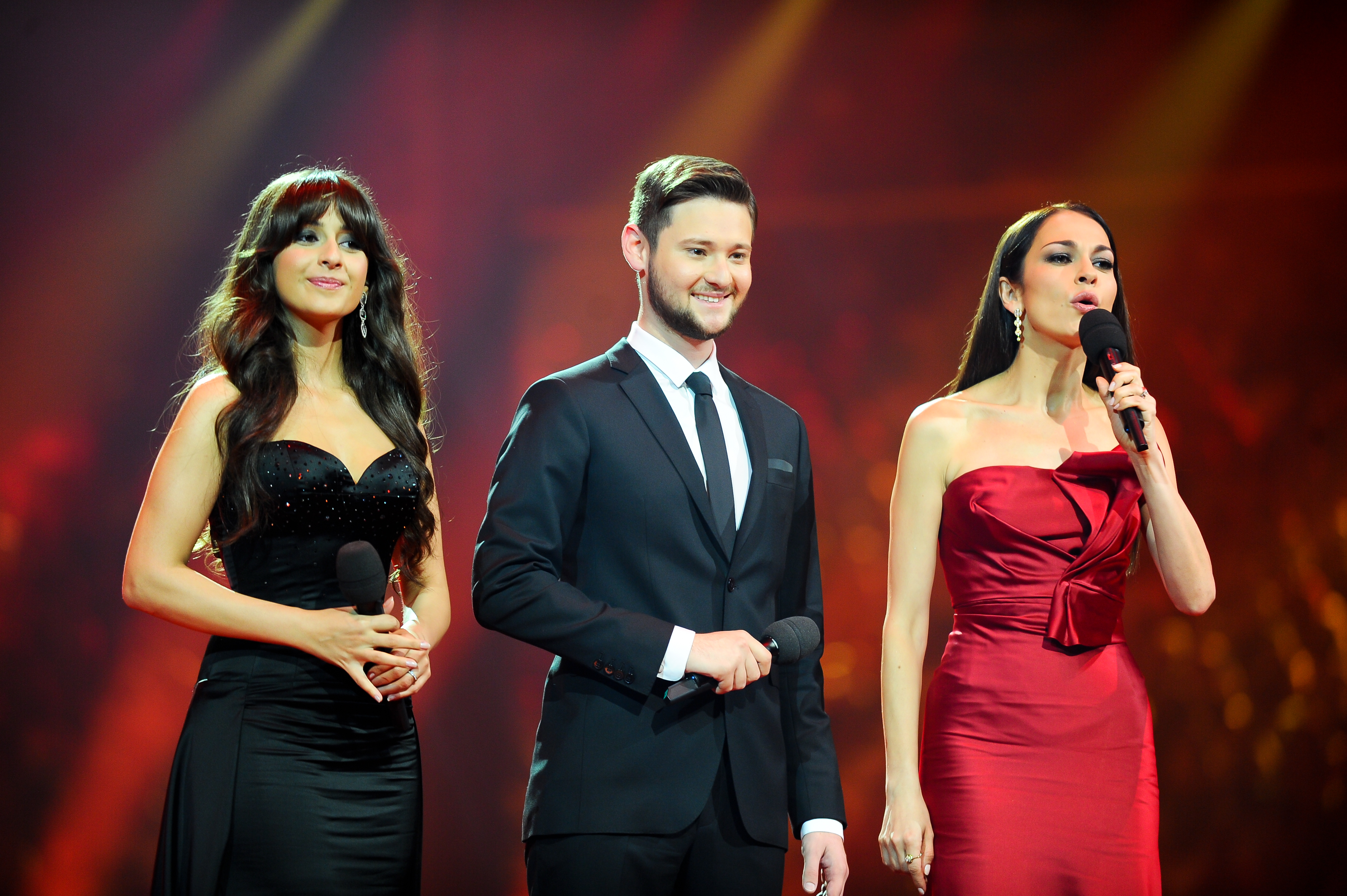
Presenters of the Eurovision Song Contest 2012, from left to right – Leyla Aliyeva, Eldar Gasimov and Nargiz Birk-Petersen

In a meeting of the Eurovision Reference Group on 29 June 2011, it was decided that the televoting system would revert the format used most recently in the 2009 contest, in which the phone and SMS lines opened for a fifteen-minute window after all songs had been performed, instead of opening before the show starts, which was the system used between 2010 and 2011. The results format of each show remained the same with each country's votes being decided on a 50:50 split between televoting and a national jury. Each participating country had their own national jury, which consisted of five professional members of the music industry.

Under the official rules released on 24 November 2011, the number of participants in the grand final was raised to 26, including the host nation, the "Big Five", and the ten qualifiers from each semi-final. This was the second time in the Eurovision Song Contest that 26 countries were in the grand final, the first being the 2003 contest.

=== Semi-final allocation draw ===
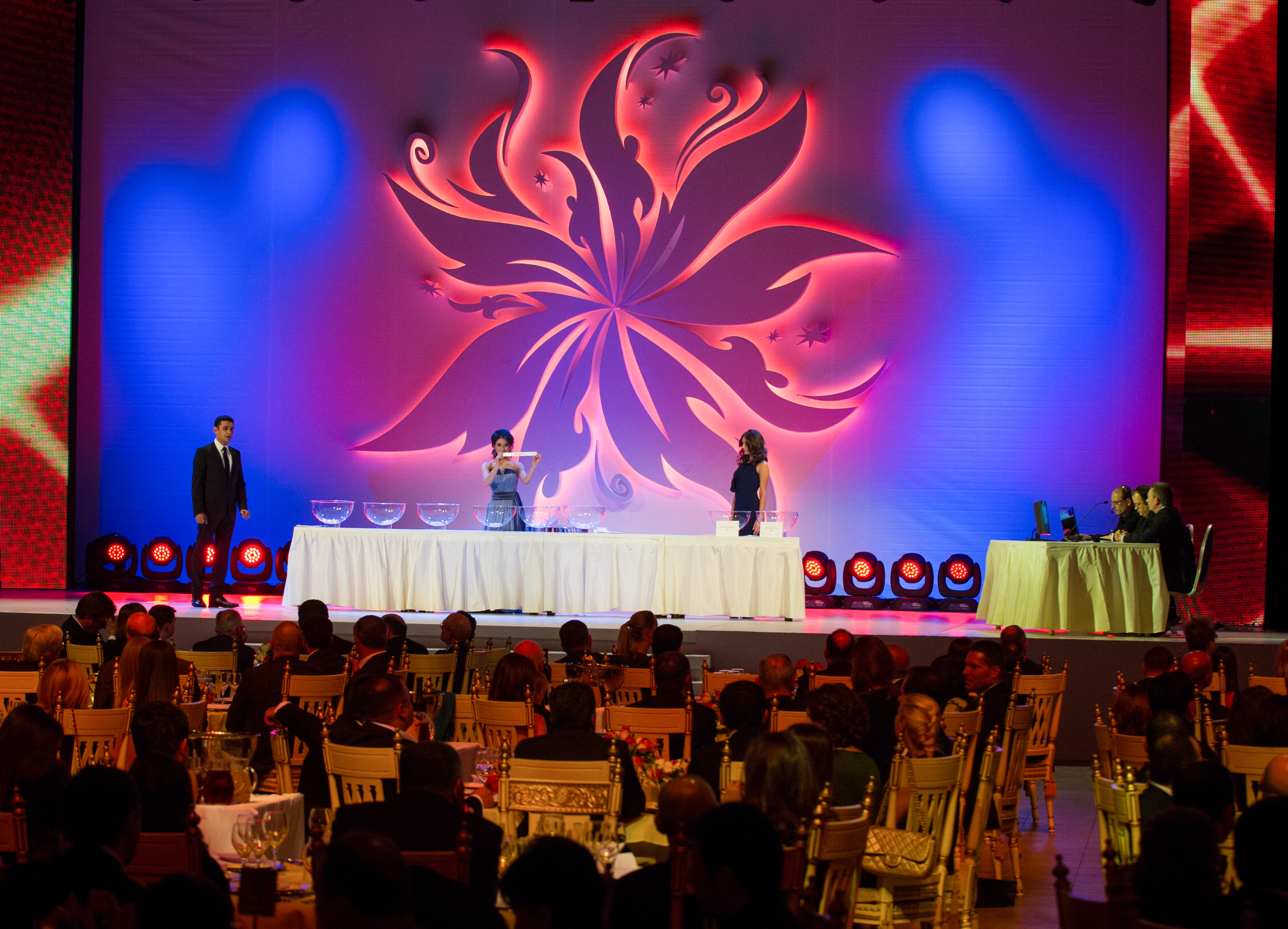
Semi-final allocation draw ceremony at the Buta Palace in Baku.

Results of the semi-final allocation draw Participating countries in the first semi-final Pre-qualified for the final but also voting in the first semi-final Participating countries in the second semi-final (Note: Armenia, which had originally been allocated into semi-final 2, withdrew from the contest in March 2012.) Pre-qualified for the final but also voting in the second semi-final

The draw that determined the semi-final running order was held on 25 January 2012 at the Buta Palace. The participating countries, excluding the automatic finalists (Azerbaijan, France, Germany, Italy, Spain and the United Kingdom), were split into six pots, based upon how those countries voted in past contests. From these pots, half (or as close to half as possible) competed in the first semi-final on 22 May 2012. The other half in that particular pot competed in the second semi-final on 24 May 2012. This draw also acted as an approximate running order, in order for the delegations from the countries to know when their rehearsals would commence and determine which semi-final the automatic finalists would be allowed to vote in.

Pot 1	Pot 2	Pot 3	Pot 4	Pot 5	Pot 6
Albania; Bosnia and Herzegovina; Croatia; Macedonia; Montenegro; Serbia; Switzerland	Denmark; Estonia; Finland; Iceland; Norway; Sweden	Belarus; Georgia; Israel; Moldova; Russia; Ukraine	~~Armenia~~; Belgium; Cyprus; Greece; Netherlands; Turkey	Ireland; Latvia; Lithuania; Malta; Portugal; Romania	Austria; Bulgaria; Hungary; San Marino; Slovakia; Slovenia

=== Graphic design ===
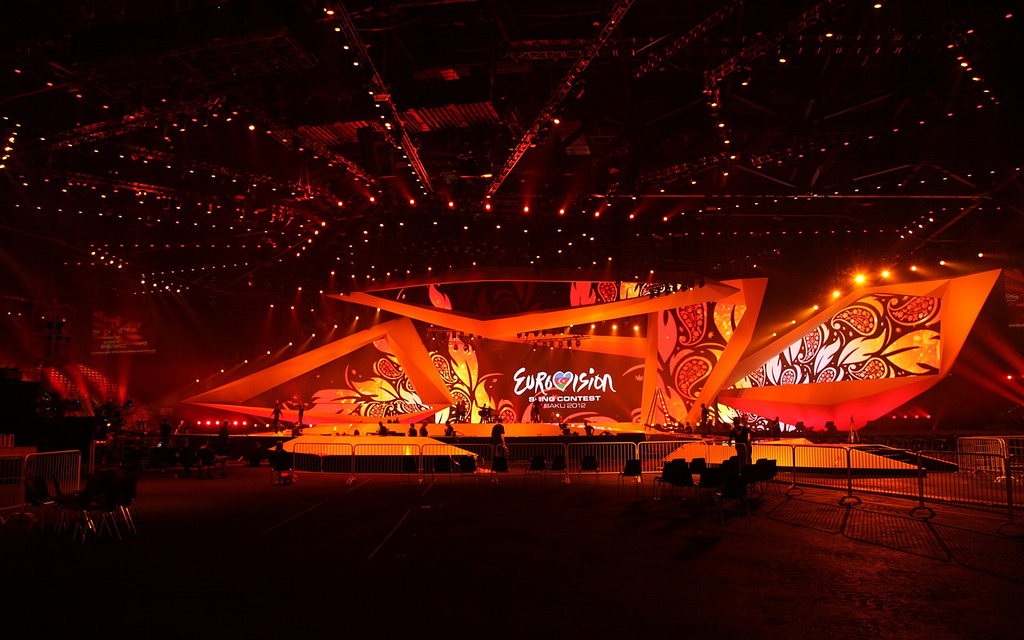
Stage design of the contest.

The design of the contest was built around the motto "Light Your Fire!", inspired by the nickname of Azerbaijan itself, "Land of Fire".

Each introductory video postcard began with a shot of the artist and performers, followed with the flag and country name in a handwritten font with a background resembling the yellow, orange and red fire of the 2012 theme art. The postcards consisted of various shots of Azerbaijan, with a caption displaying 'Azerbaijan' and underneath 'Land of ...' (e.g. Land of Abundance; Land of Poetry etc.), which were then followed by the name of a town or geographic feature, showing the landscape and culture of the country. Some postcards focused on the host city of Baku with text changing to 'Baku' and underneath 'City of ...' (e.g. City of Jazz; City of Leisure etc.). The postcards finished with a shot of the Crystal Hall displayed in the colours of the performing country's flag. These postcards acted as a tourism mechanism to present the country to a wider audience.

The artist, song and number graphics as well as tables and voting graphics were kept the same as those used in 2011, with a slight modification to incorporate the 2012 theme art. The lower points (1-7) were highlighted in red squares while the top points (8, 10, 12) were highlighted in orange squares with each square increasing in size in relation to the point value. Both sets of graphics were designed by London brand design agency Turquoise Branding.

=== Host broadcaster ===
İctimai Television (İTV), which is the EBU member that participates in the Eurovision Song Contest representing Azerbaijan, is one of country's public-service broadcasters. Azerbaijan's largest telecommunications operator, Azercell, was chosen as the presenting partner for the contest. On 1 December 2011, İTV named the German production company Brainpool as its official production partner for the contest, citing the quality of its work on the previous year's contest.

== Contest overview ==
=== Semi-final 1 ===
The first semi-final took place on 22 May 2012 at 00:00 AZST (21:00 CEST). All the countries competing in this semi-final were eligible to vote, plus Azerbaijan, Italy and Spain. The EBU allowed the Albanian broadcaster Radio Televizioni Shqiptar (RTSH) to defer transmission and only use jury votes due to the Qafa e Vishës bus accident. The highlighted countries qualified for the final.

Qualifiers

Results of the first semi-final of the Eurovision Song Contest 2012
R/O	Country	Artist	Song	Points	Place
1	Montenegro	Rambo Amadeus	"Euro Neuro"	20	15
2	Iceland	Greta Salóme and Jónsi	"Never Forget"	75	8
3	Greece	Eleftheria Eleftheriou	"Aphrodisiac"	116	4
4	Latvia	Anmary	"Beautiful Song"	17	16
5	Albania	Rona Nishliu	"Suus"	146	2
6	Romania	Mandinga	"Zaleilah"	120	3
7	Switzerland	Sinplus	"Unbreakable"	45	11
8	Belgium	Iris	"Would You?"	16	17
9	Finland	Pernilla	"När jag blundar"	41	12
10	Israel	Izabo	"Time"	33	13
11	San Marino	Valentina Monetta	"The Social Network Song (Oh Oh – Uh – Oh Oh)"	31	14
12	Cyprus	Ivi Adamou	"La La Love"	91	7
13	Denmark	Soluna Samay	"Should've Known Better"	63	9
14	Russia	Buranovskiye Babushki	"Party for Everybody"	152	1
15	Hungary	Compact Disco	"Sound of Our Hearts"	52	10
16	Austria	Trackshittaz	"Woki mit deim Popo"	8	18
17	Moldova	Pasha Parfeny	"Lăutar"	100	5
18	Ireland	Jedward	"Waterline"	92	6

=== Semi-final 2 ===
The second semi-final took place on 24 May 2012 at 00:00 AZST (21:00 CEST). All the countries competing in this semi-final were eligible to vote, plus France, Germany and the United Kingdom. Germany requested that they vote in this semi-final. Before it withdrew, Armenia was drawn to perform in the first half of this semi-final. The highlighted countries qualified for the final.

Qualifiers

Results of the second semi-final of the Eurovision Song Contest 2012
R/O	Country	Artist	Song	Points	Place
1	Serbia	Željko Joksimović	"Nije ljubav stvar"	159	2
2	Macedonia	Kaliopi	"Crno i belo"	53	9
3	Netherlands	Joan Franka	"You and Me"	35	15
4	Malta	Kurt Calleja	"This Is the Night"	70	7
5	Belarus	Litesound	"We Are the Heroes"	35	16
6	Portugal	Filipa Sousa	"Vida minha"	39	13
7	Ukraine	Gaitana	"Be My Guest"	64	8
8	Bulgaria	Sofi Marinova	"Love Unlimited"	45	11
9	Slovenia	Eva Boto	"Verjamem"	31	17
10	Croatia	Nina Badrić	"Nebo"	42	12
11	Sweden	Loreen	"Euphoria"	181	1
12	Georgia	Anri Jokhadze	"I'm a Joker"	36	14
13	Turkey	Can Bonomo	"Love Me Back"	80	5
14	Estonia	Ott Lepland	"Kuula"	100	4
15	Slovakia	Max Jason Mai	"Don't Close Your Eyes"	22	18
16	Norway	Tooji	"Stay"	45	10
17	Bosnia and Herzegovina	Maya Sar	"Korake ti znam"	77	6
18	Lithuania	Donny Montell	"Love Is Blind"	104	3

=== Final ===
The final took place on 26 May 2012 at 00:00 AZST (21:00 CEST) and was won by Sweden. The "Big Five" and the host country, Azerbaijan, qualified directly for the final. From the two semi-finals on 22 and 24 May 2012, twenty countries qualified for the final. A total of 26 countries competed in the final and all 42 participants voted.

Sweden won with 372 points, winning both the jury vote and the televote. Russia came second with 259 points, with Serbia, Azerbaijan, Albania, Estonia, Turkey, Germany, Italy and Spain completing the top ten. France, Denmark, Hungary, United Kingdom and Norway occupied the bottom five positions.

Winner

Results of the final of the Eurovision Song Contest 2012
R/O	Country	Artist	Song	Points	Place
1	United Kingdom	Engelbert Humperdinck	"Love Will Set You Free"	12	25
2	Hungary	Compact Disco	"Sound of Our Hearts"	19	24
3	Albania	Rona Nishliu	"Suus"	146	5
4	Lithuania	Donny Montell	"Love Is Blind"	70	14
5	Bosnia and Herzegovina	Maya Sar	"Korake ti znam"	55	18
6	Russia	Buranovskiye Babushki	"Party for Everybody"	259	2
7	Iceland	Greta Salóme and Jónsi	"Never Forget"	46	20
8	Cyprus	Ivi Adamou	"La La Love"	65	16
9	France	Anggun	"Echo (You and I)"	21	22
10	Italy	Nina Zilli	"L'amore è femmina (Out of Love)"	101	9
11	Estonia	Ott Lepland	"Kuula"	120	6
12	Norway	Tooji	"Stay"	7	26
13	Azerbaijan	Sabina Babayeva	"When the Music Dies"	150	4
14	Romania	Mandinga	"Zaleilah"	71	12
15	Denmark	Soluna Samay	"Should've Known Better"	21	23
16	Greece	Eleftheria Eleftheriou	"Aphrodisiac"	64	17
17	Sweden	Loreen	"Euphoria"	372	1
18	Turkey	Can Bonomo	"Love Me Back"	112	7
19	Spain	Pastora Soler	"Quédate conmigo"	97	10
20	Germany	Roman Lob	"Standing Still"	110	8
21	Malta	Kurt Calleja	"This Is the Night"	41	21
22	Macedonia	Kaliopi	"Crno i belo"	71	13
23	Ireland	Jedward	"Waterline"	46	19
24	Serbia	Željko Joksimović	"Nije ljubav stvar"	214	3
25	Ukraine	Gaitana	"Be My Guest"	65	15
26	Moldova	Pasha Parfeny	"Lăutar"	81	11

==== Spokespersons ====
Each participating broadcaster appointed a spokesperson who was responsible for announcing, in English or French, the votes for its respective country. The order in which each country announced their vote was determined in a draw following the jury results from the final dress rehearsal. Similar to the 2011 contest an algorithm was used to add as much excitement as possible. The spokespersons are shown alongside each country.

1. Albania – Andri Xhahu
2. Montenegro – Marija Marković
3. Romania – Paula Seling
4. Austria – Kati Bellowitsch
5. Ukraine – Oleksiy Matias
6. Belarus – Dmitry Koldun
7. Belgium – Peter Van de Veire
8. Azerbaijan – Safura Alizadeh
9. Malta – Keith Demicoli
10. San Marino – Monica Fabbri
11. France – Amaury Vassili
12. United Kingdom – Scott Mills
13. Turkey – Ömer Önder
14. Greece – Adriana Magania
15. Bosnia and Herzegovina – Elvir Laković Laka
16. Moldova – Olivia Fortuna
17. Bulgaria – Anna Angelova
18. Switzerland – Sara Hildebrand
19. Slovenia – Lorella Flego
20. Cyprus – Loukas Hamatsos
21. Croatia – Nevena Rendeli
22. Slovakia – Mária Pietrová
23. Macedonia – Kristina Talevska
24. Netherlands – Vivienne van den Assem
25. Portugal – Joana Teles
26. Iceland – Matthías Matthíasson
27. Sweden – Sarah Dawn Finer
28. Norway – Nadia Hasnaoui
29. Lithuania – Ignas Krupavičius
30. Estonia – Getter Jaani
31. Denmark – Louise Wolff
32. Latvia – Valters Frīdenbergs
33. Spain – Elena S. Sánchez
34. Finland – Mr Lordi
35. Georgia – Sopho Toroshelidze
36. Italy – Ivan Bacchi
37. Serbia – Maja Nikolić
38. Germany – Anke Engelke
39. Russia – Oxana Fedorova
40. Hungary – Éva Novodomszky
41. Israel – Ofer Nachshon
42. Ireland – Gráinne Seoige (Note: Ireland was originally scheduled to announce its votes as the 32nd country, but instead voted 42nd (last). The reason for this was technical difficulties in the minutes running up to the voting presentation.)

== Detailed voting results ==
The EBU and PwC audit company checked and verified the individual jury and televoting results, which were combined to create the overall national vote for the contests. On 18 June 2012, the EBU published the following results.

=== Semi-final 1 ===
Qualifiers

Split results of semi-final 1
Place	Combined		Jury		Televoting	
Place	Country	Points	Country	Points	Country	Points
1	Russia	152	Albania	131	Russia	189
2	Albania	146	Moldova	107	Romania	132
3	Romania	120	Greece	103	Albania	131
4	Greece	116	Cyprus	90	Ireland	116
5	Moldova	100	Romania	87	Greece	110
6	Ireland	92	Denmark	81	Cyprus	99
7	Cyprus	91	Hungary	76	Moldova	85
8	Iceland	75	Russia	75	Iceland	79
9	Denmark	63	Israel	72	Denmark	53
10	Hungary	52	Ireland	72	Switzerland	49
11	Switzerland	45	Iceland	70	Hungary	39
12	Finland	41	Finland	57	Finland	36
13	Israel	33	Switzerland	45	San Marino	25
14	San Marino	31	San Marino	42	Montenegro	24
15	Montenegro	20	Belgium	38	Latvia	18
16	Latvia	17	Montenegro	28	Israel	16
17	Belgium	16	Austria	27	Austria	15
18	Austria	8	Latvia	17	Belgium	2

Detailed voting results of semi-final 1
		Total score	Montenegro	Iceland	Greece	Latvia	Albania	Romania	Switzerland	Belgium	Finland	Israel	San Marino	Cyprus	Denmark	Russia	Hungary	Austria	Moldova	Ireland	Azerbaijan	Italy	Spain
Contestants	Montenegro	20					12						8										
Contestants	Iceland	75	5		5	5			4	5	10	4	3	8	10	1	4	2	2			1	6
Contestants	Greece	116	10	5			8	12	3	8		3	7	12	4	5		1	10	10	10	5	3
Contestants	Latvia	17	2													4			4	4	3		
Contestants	Albania	146	12	3	10	4		4	12	10	5	5	10	10	7	2	10	12	1	1	12	12	4
Contestants	Romania	120	7	4	8		5		2	4		8	6	6	1	8	3	5	12	12	7	10	12
Contestants	Switzerland	45		2		7	3	2				1	1	2			8	3	8			8	
Contestants	Belgium	16			4		2	1			2									6			1
Contestants	Finland	41		7		6	1		1	1		2			8		12			3			
Contestants	Israel	33				1		5			3			1	3	6	5	7					2
Contestants	San Marino	31	4		2		10												7		5	3	
Contestants	Cyprus	91	6	12	12	3	6	7		3	1	10				7			3	5	1	7	8
Contestants	Denmark	63		8	1	8		3	10		8		4	4		3	1			7		6	
Contestants	Russia	152	8	6	7	12		6	8	12	12	12	2	7	12		7	10	6	8	8	2	7
Contestants	Hungary	52					7	8	6	6	4			5	5			4	5		2		
Contestants	Austria	8		1					5	2													
Contestants	Moldova	100	3		6	2	4	10	7		6	6	5	3	6	12	2	6		2	6	4	10
Contestants	Ireland	92	1	10	3	10				7	7	7	12		2	10	6	8			4		5

==== 12 points ====
Below is a summary of the maximum 12 points each country awarded to another in the first semi-final:

N.	Contestant	Nation(s) giving 12 points
5	Albania	Austria, Azerbaijan, Italy, Montenegro, Switzerland
5	Russia	Belgium, Denmark, Finland, Israel, Latvia
3	Romania	Ireland, Moldova, Spain
2	Cyprus	Greece, Iceland
2	Greece	Cyprus, Romania
1	Finland	Hungary
1	Ireland	San Marino
1	Moldova	Russia
1	Montenegro	Albania

=== Semi-final 2 ===
Qualifiers

Split results of semi-final 2
Place	Combined		Jury		Televoting	
Place	Country	Points	Country	Points	Country	Points
1	Sweden	181	Sweden	145	Sweden	180
2	Serbia	159	Serbia	141	Serbia	148
3	Lithuania	104	Ukraine	109	Lithuania	128
4	Estonia	100	Estonia	102	Turkey	114
5	Turkey	80	Malta	97	Estonia	88
6	Bosnia and Herzegovina	77	Bosnia and Herzegovina	77	Norway	72
7	Malta	70	Croatia	66	Bosnia and Herzegovina	70
8	Ukraine	64	Georgia	62	Macedonia	63
9	Macedonia	53	Macedonia	58	Bulgaria	59
10	Norway	45 (Note: Despite finishing with the same number of points as Bulgaria, Norway is deemed to have finished in tenth place due to receiving points from a greater number of countries, which resulted in Norway qualifying for the final over Bulgaria.)	Lithuania	55	Netherlands	51
11	Bulgaria	45	Belarus	52	Malta	39
12	Croatia	42	Portugal	49	Belarus	37
13	Portugal	39	Turkey	42	Portugal	37
14	Georgia	36	Slovenia	40	Croatia	34
15	Netherlands	35 (Note: Despite finishing with the same number of points as Belarus, the Netherlands is deemed to have finished in fifteenth place due to receiving points from a greater number of countries.)	Slovakia	40	Slovakia	32
16	Belarus	35	Netherlands	31	Slovenia	27
17	Slovenia	31	Bulgaria	27	Ukraine	24
18	Slovakia	22	Norway	25	Georgia	15

Detailed voting results of semi-final 2
		Total score	Serbia	Macedonia	Netherlands	Malta	Belarus	Portugal	Ukraine	Bulgaria	Slovenia	Croatia	Sweden	Georgia	Turkey	Estonia	Slovakia	Norway	Bosnia and Herzegovina	Lithuania	France	Germany	United Kingdom
Contestants	Serbia	159		12	10	5	8	8	8	12	12	10	8	10		1	8	10	10	2	12	10	3
Contestants	Macedonia	53	8			1	2		5	7	6	7		1	8				8				
Contestants	Netherlands	35									2		1		7	7		3		3		8	4
Contestants	Malta	70	3	2	2		5		6	6	4	5	4	4	6	3	2			6			12
Contestants	Belarus	35		1	1	4			12			2		8						7			
Contestants	Portugal	39			6						3	3			1		5	5	4	1	8	3	
Contestants	Ukraine	64	4	3		6	12	2		5		1	6	6		5	1	2	2	5	2		2
Contestants	Bulgaria	45	2	6		2		6							10			6	3		3	2	5
Contestants	Slovenia	31	10	4								8							5			4	
Contestants	Croatia	42	12	7			1		1		8								12			1	
Contestants	Sweden	181	7	8	12	8	7	10	7	10	10	6		12	5	12	12	12	7	10	6	12	8
Contestants	Georgia	36					6	1	10						3	4				12			
Contestants	Turkey	80		10	7	12			2	8			7	3		2	3	1	6		7	6	6
Contestants	Estonia	100			8		4	12	3	3	1		12	7			10	8		8	10	7	7
Contestants	Slovakia	22	1			7		4					3			6					1		
Contestants	Norway	45			3	3	3	3		2			10		4	8	4		1	4			
Contestants	Bosnia and Herzegovina	77	5	5	5			5		1	5	12	5	2	12		6	4			4	5	1
Contestants	Lithuania	104	6		4	10	10	7	4	4	7	4	2	5	2	10	7	7			5		10

==== 12 points ====
Below is a summary of the maximum 12 points each country awarded to another in the second semi-final:

N.	Contestant	Nation(s) giving 12 points
6	Sweden	Estonia, Georgia, Germany, Netherlands, Norway, Slovakia
4	Serbia	Bulgaria, France, Macedonia, Slovenia
2	Bosnia and Herzegovina	Croatia, Turkey
2	Croatia	Bosnia and Herzegovina, Serbia
2	Estonia	Portugal, Sweden
1	Belarus	Ukraine
1	Georgia	Lithuania
1	Malta	United Kingdom
1	Turkey	Malta
1	Ukraine	Belarus

=== Final ===
Winner

Split results of the final
Place	Combined		Jury		Televoting	
Place	Country	Points	Country	Points	Country	Points
1	Sweden	372	Sweden	296	Sweden	343
2	Russia	259	Serbia	173	Russia	332
3	Serbia	214	Albania	157	Serbia	211
4	Azerbaijan	150	Italy	157	Turkey	176
5	Albania	146	Spain	154	Azerbaijan	151
6	Estonia	120	Estonia	152	Germany	125
7	Turkey	112	Ukraine	125	Romania	117
8	Germany	110	Azerbaijan	118	Albania	106
9	Italy	101	Moldova	104	Greece	89
10	Spain	97	Germany	98	Ireland	89
11	Moldova	81	Russia	94	Macedonia	79
12	Romania	71 (Note: Despite finishing with the same number of points as Macedonia, Romania is deemed to have finished in twelfth place due to receiving points from a greater number of countries.)	Cyprus	85	Estonia	78
13	Macedonia	71	France	85	Moldova	75
14	Lithuania	70	Lithuania	82	Lithuania	68
15	Ukraine	65	Bosnia and Herzegovina	71	Cyprus	63
16	Cyprus	65	Malta	70	Bosnia and Herzegovina	57
17	Greece	64	Macedonia	69	Italy	56
18	Bosnia and Herzegovina	55	Greece	60	Spain	45
19	Ireland	46	Iceland	53	Iceland	39
20	Iceland	46	Romania	53	Ukraine	37
21	Malta	41	Denmark	51	United Kingdom	36
22	France	21	Turkey	50	Hungary	20
23	Denmark	21	Hungary	30	Denmark	18
24	Hungary	19	Norway	24	Norway	16
25	United Kingdom	12	Ireland	14	Malta	10
26	Norway	7	United Kingdom	11	France	0

Detailed voting results of the final
		Total score	Albania	Montenegro	Romania	Austria	Ukraine	Belarus	Belgium	Azerbaijan	Malta	San Marino	France	United Kingdom	Turkey	Greece	Bosnia and Herzegovina	Moldova	Bulgaria	Switzerland	Slovenia	Cyprus	Croatia	Slovakia	Macedonia	Netherlands	Portugal	Iceland	Sweden	Norway	Lithuania	Estonia	Denmark	Latvia	Spain	Finland	Georgia	Italy	Serbia	Germany	Russia	Hungary	Israel	Ireland
Contestants	United Kingdom	12							1																							5		2										4
Contestants	Hungary	19			7										1			1						8															2					
Contestants	Albania	146		10	1	8			10		1	12			5	10	6		4	12	3	4	5		12				1				5	1		6	3	12	1	6		8		
Contestants	Lithuania	70		1				8		4	4		3	7					5							1				6		3		4			12				5			7
Contestants	Bosnia and Herzegovina	55		6		7									10					1	7		10	2	7														5					
Contestants	Russia	259	3	4	4	5	10	12	8	10	3	10	4	3	7	4	3	6	6		8	5	6	3	4	4	8	7	7	8	6	8	8	10	8	8	5	10	7	7		7	7	6
Contestants	Iceland	46																			4	1		4						5		6	6		4	7				3		6		
Contestants	Cyprus	65	6		2					2						12												8	12						5			5	8		2		3	
Contestants	France	21				2											2			6								6	2					3										
Contestants	Italy	101	7	2			4				10	7	1			3		5		5	5	2	2	5	5		2			4	4	7	3		1		4			2		5	4	2
Contestants	Estonia	120					1	4					10	4				2						10		7	7	10	8	7	8			8	6	10				4	6			8
Contestants	Norway	7																								3		1	3															
Contestants	Azerbaijan	150	4	5			12	7			12	4		2	12	5	7	10	10			8		6	2						12						10		3		10		8	1
Contestants	Romania	71							3	6			2		4	7		12				3					4						1		10			7			1		6	5
Contestants	Denmark	21																										5		2		2				5		2		5				
Contestants	Greece	64	12		8		5		2	5					3		1	4	1			12															1		4	1	3		2	
Contestants	Sweden	372	5	7	10	12	6	6	12	7	6	3	12	12	6	6	8	7	8	7	10	10	7	12	6	12	3	12		12	10	12	12	12	12	12	8		10	12	12	12	12	12
Contestants	Turkey	112	10		3	3			7	12	8	5	5	1			4		7	3					8	8			6		1		2				7			8		3	1	
Contestants	Spain	97			6	6			6			1	6	8			5		3	8		6				6	12	2	4			4				3						1	10	
Contestants	Germany	110	2			4					2		7	6						4	2		4			2	10			3	3	10	10	7	3	1	2	8				10		10
Contestants	Malta	41					7	3		8		2		5	2										1						7								6					
Contestants	Macedonia	71	8	8			3	2							8		12		2		6		8	1														1	12					
Contestants	Ireland	46						1	4	1				10									3			5		4	5				4	5		4								
Contestants	Serbia	214	1	12	5	10	2		5		5	6	8			8	10	3	12	10	12	7	12	7	10	10	5	3	10	10	5					2		6		10	4	4		
Contestants	Ukraine	65						10		3	7					1		8							3		1			1	2	1		6	2		6	3			8			3
Contestants	Moldova	81		3	12	1	8	5				8				2				2	1		1				6						7		7			4			7	2	5	

==== 12 points ====
Below is a summary of the maximum 12 points each country awarded to another in the grand final:

N.	Contestant	Nation(s) giving 12 points
18	Sweden	Austria, Belgium, Denmark, Estonia, Finland, France, Germany, Hungary, Iceland, Ireland, Israel, Latvia, Netherlands, Norway, Russia, Slovakia, Spain, United Kingdom
4	Albania	Macedonia, Italy, San Marino, Switzerland
4	Azerbaijan	Lithuania, Malta, Turkey, Ukraine
4	Serbia	Bulgaria, Croatia, Montenegro, Slovenia
2	Cyprus	Greece, Sweden
2	Greece	Albania, Cyprus
2	Macedonia	Bosnia and Herzegovina, Serbia
1	Lithuania	Georgia
1	Moldova	Romania
1	Romania	Moldova
1	Russia	Belarus
1	Spain	Portugal
1	Turkey	Azerbaijan

== Broadcasts ==
Most countries sent commentators to Baku or commentated from their own country, in order to add insight to the participants and, if necessary, the provision of voting information. In addition to the participating countries, the hosts mentioned that the contest was also broadcast in Australia and New Zealand. Known details on the broadcasts in each country, including the specific broadcasting stations and commentators are shown in the tables below.

Broadcasters and commentators in participating countries
Country	Broadcaster	Channel(s)	Show(s)	Commentator(s)	Ref(s)
Austria	ORF	ORF eins	All shows	Andi Knoll	
Austria	ORF	ORF eins	Final	Stermann and Grissemann and Lukas Plöchl	
Azerbaijan	İTV		All shows	Konul Arifgizi and Saleh Baghirov	
Belgium	VRT	één, Radio 2	All shows	André Vermeulen and Peter Van de Veire	
Belgium	RTBF	La Une	All shows	Jean-Pierre Hautier and Jean-Louis Lahaye	
Bosnia and Herzegovina	BHRT	BHT 1	All shows	Dejan Kukrić	
Croatia	HRT	HRT 1	All shows	Duško Ćurlić	
Cyprus	CyBC	RIK 1	All shows	Melina Karageorgiou	
Denmark	DR	DR1, DR HD	All shows	Ole Tøpholm	
Finland	YLE	YLE TV2, YLE HD	All shows	Finnish: Tarja Närhi and Tobias Larsson; Swedish: Eva Frantz and Johan Lindroos	
Finland	YLE	YLE Radio Suomi	All shows	Sanna Kojo and Jorma Hietamäki	
Finland	YLE	Yle Radio Vega	All shows	Eva Frantz and Johan Lindroos	
France	France Télévisions	France3.fr	SF1		
France	France Télévisions	France Ô	SF2	Audrey Chauveau and Bruno Berberes	
France	France Télévisions	France 3	Final	Cyril Féraud and Mireille Dumas	
Germany	ARD	Das Erste	All shows	Peter Urban	
Germany	NDR	NDR 2	All shows	Thomas Mohr	
Germany	HR	hr3	All shows	Tim Frühling	
Greece	ERT	NET	All shows	Maria Kozakou	
Hungary	MTVA	m1	All shows	Gábor Gundel Takács	
Iceland	RÚV	Sjónvarpið	All shows	Hrafnhildur Halldorsdóttir	
Ireland	RTÉ	RTÉ Two	Semi-finals	Marty Whelan	
Ireland	RTÉ	RTÉ One	Final	Marty Whelan	
Ireland	RTÉ	RTÉ Radio 1	Final	Shay Byrne and Zbyszek Zalinski	
Italy	RAI	Rai 5	SF1	Federica Gentile	
Italy	RAI	Rai 2	Final	Filippo Solibello and Marco Ardemagni	
Latvia	LTV	LTV1	All shows	Valters Frīdenbergs	
Latvia	LTV	LTV1	Final	Kārlis Būmeisters	
Macedonia	MRT	MRT 1	All shows	Karolina Petkovska	
Montenegro	RTCG	TVCG 1	SF1/Final	Dražen Bauković and Tamara Ivanković	
Montenegro	RTCG	TVCG 2	SF2	Dražen Bauković and Tamara Ivanković	
Montenegro	RTCG	RTCG Sat	All shows	Dražen Bauković and Tamara Ivanković	
Netherlands	TROS	Nederland 1	All shows	Jan Smit and Daniël Dekker	
Norway	NRK	NRK1	All shows	Olav Viksmo-Slettan	
Portugal	RTP	RTP1	All shows	Pedro Granger	
Romania	TVR	TVR 1	All shows	Leonard Miron and Gianina Corondan	
Russia	RTR	Russia-1	All shows	Olga Shelest and Dmitry Guberniev	
San Marino	SMRTV	SMtv San Marino	All shows	Lia Fiorio and Gigi Restivo	
Serbia	RTS	RTS1, RTS Sat	SF1	Dragan Ilić	
Serbia	RTS	RTS1, RTS Sat	SF2/Final	Duška Vučinić-Lučić	
Slovakia	RTVS	Rádio FM	Final	Daniel Baláž and Pavol Hubinák	
Slovenia	RTVSLO	TV SLO 2	Semi-finals	Andrej Hofer	
Slovenia	RTVSLO	TV SLO 1	Final	Andrej Hofer	
Spain	RTVE	La 2	SF1	José María Íñigo	
Spain	RTVE	La 1	Final	José María Íñigo	
Sweden	SVT	SVT1	All shows	Gina Dirawi and Edward af Sillén	
Sweden	SR	SR P3	All shows	Carolina Norén and Björn Kjellman	
Switzerland	SRG SSR	SF zwei	SF1/Final	Sven Epiney	
Switzerland	SRG SSR	RTS Deux	SF1/Final	Jean-Marc Richard and Nicolas Tanner	
Switzerland	SRG SSR	RSI La 2	SF1	Clarissa Tami and Paolo Meneguzzi	
Switzerland	SRG SSR	RSI La 1	Final	Clarissa Tami and Paolo Meneguzzi	
Turkey	TRT	TRT 1, TRT HD, TRT Türk, TRT Müzik, TRT Avaz	All shows	Bülend Özveren and Erhan Konuk	
Ukraine	NTU	Pershyi Natsionalnyi	All shows	Timur Miroshnychenko and Tetyana Terekhova	
United Kingdom	BBC	BBC Three	Semi-finals	Scott Mills and Sara Cox	
United Kingdom	BBC	BBC One	Final	Graham Norton	
United Kingdom	BBC	BBC Radio 2	Final	Ken Bruce	

Broadcasters and commentators in non-participating countries
Country	Broadcaster	Channel(s)	Show(s)	Commentator(s)	Ref(s)
Armenia	AMPTV	Armenia 1	All shows	Gohar Gasparyan and Artur Grigoryan	
Australia	SBS	SBS One	All shows (Note: Broadcast on 26 and 27 May 2012)	Julia Zemiro and Sam Pang	

== Incidents and controversies ==
=== Human rights concerns ===
Azerbaijan's large investment in hosting the Eurovision contest was widely discussed in Western media as an attempt to "mitigate misgivings about its poor democracy and human rights record". Elnur Majidli, an activist imprisoned during the Arab Spring-inspired 2011 Azerbaijani protests, was released in an apparent effort to soften Azerbaijan's image ahead of the contest, but many political prisoners remained. Human Rights Watch reported a "violent crackdown on protesters" on the eve of the contest, and Amnesty International condemned the "stern crackdown of freedom of expression, dissent, non-governmental organizations (NGOs), critical journalists, in fact anyone who criticised the Aliyev regime too strongly" that continued up to the contest.

Human Rights Watch also criticised the Azerbaijani government and the Baku City Authority for carrying out forced evictions against local residents, in order to allow for the demolition of flats to make way for construction in the neighbourhood where the Baku Crystal Hall was built. The Public Association for Assistance to Free Economy, a transparency and economic rights campaign group, had described the evictions as a "violation of human rights", and as having "no legal authority". However, in a statement to the BBC, the EBU said that on a recent visit to Baku they had observed "that the construction of the concert hall [which] media reports refer to was already well under way on a clean construction site and thus there are no demolitions needed". The EBU cited the "apolitical" nature of the contest and the Azerbaijani government's claim that the construction was not tied to the contest.

The contest's eventual winner Loreen met local human rights activists during the event weeks, the only entrant to do so. She later told reporters, "Human rights are violated in Azerbaijan every day. One should not be silent about such things." An Azerbaijan government spokesman criticized her in response, saying that the contest should not "be politicised" and requested the EBU prevented further meetings of a similar nature. Swedish diplomats replied that the EBU, the Swedish broadcaster SVT and Loreen had not acted against the competition's rules.

On 26 May, a flash mob of anti-government protesters were quickly dispersed by police. Activists expressed fears that they would face a crackdown when the international spotlight left Azerbaijan again at the end of the contest. Before presenting the results of the German vote, the German spokesperson Anke Engelke gave a live statement that alluded to the human rights issues in Azerbaijan, saying: "Tonight nobody could vote for their own country. But it is good to be able to vote. And it is good to have a choice. Good luck on your journey, Azerbaijan. Europe is watching you."

=== Tensions with Iran ===
Iranian officials objected to Azerbaijan hosting the contest, with Iranian clerics Ayatollah Mohammad Mojtahed Shabestari and Ayatollah Ja'far Sobhani condemning Azerbaijan for "anti-Islamic behaviour", while also claiming that Azerbaijan was hosting a gay parade. This led to protests in front of Iranian embassy in Baku, where protesters carried slogans mocking the Iranian leaders. Ali Hasanov, head of the public and political issues department in Azerbaijani president's administration, said that gay parade claims were untrue, and advised Iran not to meddle in Azerbaijan's internal affairs. In response, Iran recalled its ambassador from Baku, while Azerbaijan demanded a formal apology from Iran for its statements in connection with Baku's hosting of the contest, and later also recalled its ambassador from Iran.

On 30 May, the Ministry of National Security of Azerbaijan announced that they had thwarted a series of planned terror attacks against the contest, among the targets being Baku Crystal Hall, as well as Marriott and Hilton hotels in Baku. On 22 August, The Daily Telegraph reported that according to Western intelligence services, Iran's Supreme Leader Ali Khamenei personally gave orders to the elite Quds Force unit to launch terrorist attacks against the West and its allies, including Azerbaijan during the contest.

== Other awards ==
In addition to the main winner's trophy, the Marcel Bezençon Awards and the Barbara Dex Award were contested during the 2012 Eurovision Song Contest. The OGAE, "General Organisation of Eurovision Fans" voting poll also took place before the contest.

=== Marcel Bezençon Awards ===
The Marcel Bezençon Awards, organised since 2002 by Sweden's then-Head of Delegation and 1992 representative Christer Björkman, and 1984 winner Richard Herrey, honours songs in the contest's final. The awards are divided into three categories: Artistic Award, Composers Award, and Press Award.

Category	Country	Song	Artist	Songwriter(s)
Artistic Award	Sweden	"Euphoria"	Loreen	Thomas G:son; Peter Boström
Composers Award	Sweden	"Euphoria"	Loreen	Thomas G:son; Peter Boström
Press Award	Azerbaijan	"When the Music Dies"	Sabina Babayeva	Anders Bagge; Sandra Bjurman; Stefan Örn; Johan Kronlund

=== OGAE ===
OGAE, an organisation of over forty Eurovision Song Contest fan clubs across Europe and beyond, conducts an annual voting poll first held in 2002 as the Marcel Bezençon Fan Award. After all votes were cast, the top-ranked entry in the 2012 poll was also the winner of the contest, "Euphoria" performed by Loreen; the top five results are shown below.

Country	Song	Artist	Points
Sweden	"Euphoria"	Loreen	375
Italy	"L'amore è femmina (Out of Love)"	Nina Zilli	212
Iceland	"Never Forget"	Greta Salóme and Jónsi	211
Serbia	"Nije ljubav stvar"	Željko Joksimović	199
Norway	"Stay"	Tooji	164

=== Barbara Dex Award ===
The Barbara Dex Award is a humorous fan award given to the worst dressed artist each year. Named after Belgium's representative who came last in the 1993 contest, wearing her self-designed dress, the award was handed by the fansite House of Eurovision from 1997 to 2016 and is being carried out by the fansite songfestival.be since 2017.

Place	Country	Artist	Votes
1	Albania	Rona Nishliu	829
2	Ireland	Jedward	551
3	Bulgaria	Sofi Marinova	232
4	Netherlands	Joan Franka	163
5	Ukraine	Gaitana	145

== Official album ==
Cover art of the official album

Eurovision Song Contest: Baku 2012 was a compilation album put together by the European Broadcasting Union, and released by Universal Music Group on 4 May 2012. The album featured all 42 songs that entered in the 2012 contest, including the semi-finalists that failed to qualify into the grand final.

=== Charts ===
Chart (2012)	Peak position
German Compilation Albums (Offizielle Top 100)	2

== See also ==
- ABU Radio Song Festival 2012
- ABU TV Song Festival 2012
- Eurovision Young Musicians 2012
- Junior Eurovision Song Contest 2012
