= Can Bonomo =

Turkish singer (born 1987)

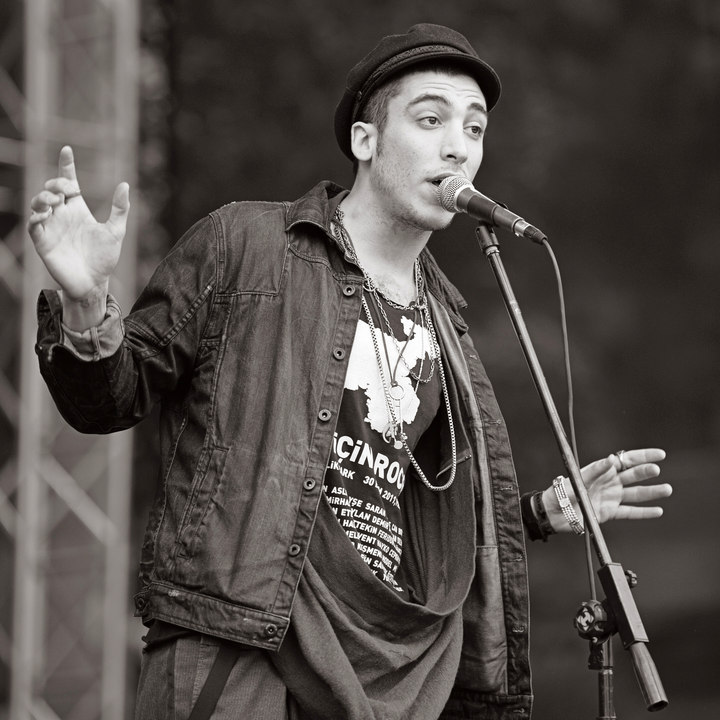
- Bonomo performing in October 2011
- Born: 16 May 1987 (age 39); İzmir, Turkey
- Education: Istanbul Bilgi University
- Occupations: Singer-songwriter; actor; poet
- Height: 1.84 m (6 ft 0 in)
- Spouse: Öykü Karayel (m. 2018)
- Children: 1
- Musical career
- Genres: Alternative rock; pop rock
- Instruments: Guitar; piano
- Years active: 2011–present
- Labels: WePlay; Avrupa
- Website: www.canbonomo.com

Can Bonomo (born 16 May 1987) is a Turkish singer who represented Turkey in the Eurovision Song Contest 2012 in Baku, Azerbaijan.

== Early life ==
Bonomo was born in İzmir, Turkey to a Sephardic Jewish family. At the age of 17, he began his official career as a vocal productionist in Istanbul. At the same time, Bonomo went on with studying TV and cinema at the Istanbul Bilgi University with his programmes being aired on popular radio channels such as Number 1 FM, Radio101 and Radio Class. His radio programmes were followed by programmes in international TV channels such as MTV and Number One TV. Also, he composed the songs for other singers. Can Bonomo has released 6 studio albums to date. His most recent album, "Kara Konular" was released on 16 February 2024.

Alongside his musical career, Bonomo writes poetry. His first poetry book, Delirmek Belirmektir was published in 2013. His second poetry book, "Şu Sevdalar Tevatürü" was published in 2016. His third poetry book was titled "Parya Koma". In 2024, Bonomo released a novel, "Ateşli Silahlar ve Bilardo". His most recent poetry book "Mümkansız Şeyler", was published in 2026.

== Eurovision 2012 ==
In January 2012, he was internally selected to represent Turkey in the Eurovision Song Contest 2012 in Baku, Azerbaijan. In February 2012, Bonomo revealed his song "Love Me Back" to the public. He placed seventh with the song at the contest's final competition on 26 May 2012. He was also the last representative of Turkey at Eurovision, as the country withdrew from Eurovision the following year and has yet to return.

== Discography ==
=== Albums ===
- Meczup (2011)
- Aşktan Ve Gariplikten (2012)
- Bulunmam Gerek (2014)
- Kâinat Sustu (2017)
- Ruhum Bela (2019)
- Kara Konular (2024)

=== Maxi singles ===
- Rüyamda Buluttum / Acı Kiraz (2021)

=== Non-album Singles ===
Non-album singles
Years	Title
2012	"Love Me Back"
2013	"Kara"
2020	"Sen Bunları Duyma"
2020	"Güneş"
2020	"Yine Karşılaşırsak"
2021	"Kaplan"
2021	"Misafir" (with Can Temiz)
2021	"Dağ"
2022	"Gazapistan"
2023	"Sustum"

== Filmography ==
=== Television ===
Year	Program	Role	Notes
2011	+18	Can	episodes 1, 2, 3, 4 and 5
2014	Yalan Dünya	Himself	episodes 68, 69 and 70
2015	Güldür Güldür	Himself	episode 55
2016	Aile İşi	Berk	episode 13
2019	Jet Sosyete	Himself	episode 35

=== Cinema ===
Year	Title	Role	Notes
2017	Housewife	The man at the exhibition	Cameo

== Poetry books ==
- Delirmek Belirmektir (2013)
- Şu Sevdalar Tevatürü (2016)
- Parya Koma (2018)
- Mümkansız Şeyler (2026)

== Awards ==
- 8th Radio Boğaziçi Music Awards – Best New Artist
- 38th Golden Butterfly Television Awards – Best New Artist
- 2nd OMÜ Media Awards – Best New Artist
- European Journalists Association Awards – Best Pop/Rock Music Artist of the Year
- 10th Radio Boğaziçi Music Awards – Best Alternative Music Artist
- 15th Radio Boğaziçi Music Awards "Best Album "
- 15th Radio Boğaziçi Music Awards "Best Duet " Terslik Var feat. Ceza

Preceded by Yüksek Sadakat with "Live It Up"	Turkey in the Eurovision Song Contest; 2012	Succeeded by Withdrawn
