= Meczup =

Studio album by Can Bonomo
- Released: January 19, 2011
- Genre: Jazz, pop, rock
- Length: 41:51
- Label: We Play
- Producer: Can Saban

Can Bonomo chronology
Meczup (2011)	Aşktan Ve Gariplikten (2012)

Singles from Meczup
- 1. "Şaşkın" Released: January 25, 2011; 2. "Bana Bir Saz Verin" Released: April 28, 2011; 3. "Meczup" Released: November 12, 2011

Meczup (English: Lunatic) is a debut solo album by Turkish jazz singer Can Bonomo.

== Track listing ==
1. "Bana Bir Saz Verin" (4:07)
2. "Balon" (3:07)
3. "Opium" (3:13)
4. "Hep Bi' Derdi Olur" (3:50)
5. "Ayıl" (4:07)
6. "Sebebi Var" (3:54)
7. "Şaşkın" (2:59)
8. "Ben Yağmurum" (2:46)
9. "Süper" (4:47)
10. "Meczup" (3:48)
11. "Daha Sıcak Daha Dumanlı" (5:13)
