= Macedonia in the Eurovision Song Contest 2012 =

- Eurovision Song Contest 2012
- Country: Macedonia
- Selection process: Internal selection
- Announcement date: Artist: 19 November 2011; Song: 29 February 2012

Competing entry
- Song: "Crno i belo"
- Artist: Kaliopi
- Songwriters: Kaliopi; Romeo Grill

Placement
- Semi-final result: Qualified (9th, 53 points)
- Final result: 13th, 71 points

Participation chronology

Macedonia (Note: Officially under the provisional appellation "former Yugoslav Republic of Macedonia", abbreviated "FYR Macedonia".) was represented at the Eurovision Song Contest 2012 with the song "Crno i belo" written by Kaliopi and Romeo Grill. The song was performed by Kaliopi, who was internally selected by the Macedonian broadcaster Macedonian Radio Television (MRT) to compete for Macedonia at the 2012 contest in Baku, Azerbaijan. Kaliopi's appointment as the Macedonian representative was announced on 19 November 2011, while her song, "Crno i belo", was presented to the public in a television special titled Evrosong 2012 ("Eurosong 2012") on 29 February 2012.

Macedonia was drawn to compete in the second semi-final of the Eurovision Song Contest which took place on 24 May 2012. Performing during the show in position 2, "Crno i belo" was announced among the top 10 entries of the second semi-final and therefore qualified to compete in the final on 26 May. It was later revealed that Macedonia placed ninth out of the 18 participating countries in the semi-final with 53 points. In the final, Macedonia performed in position 22 and placed thirteenth out of the 26 participating countries, scoring 71 points.

== Background ==
Prior to the 2012 contest, Macedonia had participated in the Eurovision Song Contest eleven times since its first entry in 1998. The nation's best result in the contest to this point was twelfth, which it achieved in 2006 with the song "Ninanajna" performed by Elena Risteska. Following the introduction of semi-finals for the 2004, Macedonia had featured in only four finals.

The Macedonian national broadcaster, Macedonian Radio Television (MRT), broadcasts the event within Macedonia and organises the selection process for the nation's entry. Macedonia had previously selected their entry for the Eurovision Song Contest through both national finals and internal selections. MRT confirmed their intentions to participate at the 2012 Eurovision Song Contest on 19 November 2011. Between 2008 and 2011, Macedonia selected their entries using the national final Skopje Fest. During this period, the nation failed to qualify to the final on every occasion. For 2012, MRT internally selected the Macedonian artist and with the song originally planned to be selected through a three-song national final. However, the broadcaster ultimately opted to also internally select the song.

== Before Eurovision ==
=== Internal selection ===
On 19 November 2011, MRT announced that they had internally selected Kaliopi to represent Macedonia in Baku. Kaliopi was previously the proposed Macedonian entry in 1996 with the song "Samo ti"; however, the entry was eliminated in an audio-only pre-qualifying round. Kaliopi had previously attempted to participate in the Eurovision Song Contest on several occasions. Her earliest attempt was in 1987 when she competed in the Yugoslav national final with the song "Emanuel" which placed tenth. The singer had also competed in several Macedonian national final selections over the years: in 1998 with the song "Ne zaboravaj" which placed ninth, in 2006 with the song "Silna" which placed sixth, and in 2009 with the song "Rum Dum Dum" which she performed in a duet with Naum Petreski and placed second.

On 16 February 2012, it was announced that Kaliopi would perform the song "Crno i belo" at the Eurovision Song Contest 2012. "Crno i belo" and was presented to the public in a special show hosted by Dimitar Atanasovski titled Evrosong 2012 ("Eurosong 2012"), which took place on 29 February 2012 and was broadcast on MRT 1, MRT Sat and online via the official Eurovision Song Contest website eurovision.tv. In addition to presenting Kaliopi's 2012 Eurovision entry, the show featured performances of songs from her repertoire. "Crno i belo" was composed by Romeo Grill with lyrics written by Kaliopi herself, and was selected from several proposals that MRT received from local and international composers. During a press conference in November 2011 following the artist announcement, Kaliopi stated that her contest entry would be created by the singer herself and performed in Macedonian.

=== Promotion ===
Kaliopi made several appearances across Europe to specifically promote "Crno i belo" as the Macedonian Eurovision entry. On 18 February, Kaliopi performed during the presentation show of the 2012 Croatian Eurovision entry, Dora 2012 - Idemo na Eurosong s Ninom!. On 21 April, Kaliopi performed during the Eurovision in Concert event which was held at the Melkweg venue in Amsterdam, Netherlands and hosted by Ruth Jacott and Cornald Maas. On 23 April, Kaliopi performed during the London Eurovision Party, which was held at the Shadow Lounge venue in London, United Kingdom and hosted by Nicki French and Paddy O'Connell. On 26 April, Kaliopi appeared in and performed during the RTV Pink programme Ami G Show in Serbia. Between 4 and 5 May, Kaliopi took part in promotional activities in Belarus by giving interviews to media outlets and appearing during talk show programmes to discuss her Eurovision participation. Between 5 and 6 May, Kaliopi completed promotional activities in Ukraine and recorded the Russian version of "Crno i belo" in Kyiv.

== At Eurovision ==
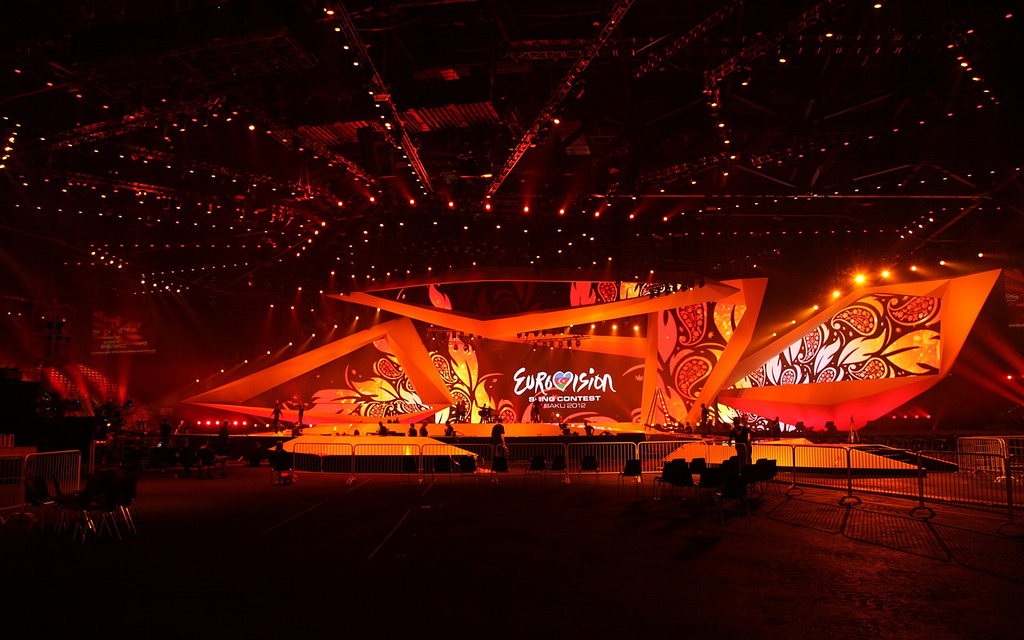
The Eurovision Song Contest 2012 took place at the Baku Crystal Hall in Baku, Azerbaijan

According to Eurovision rules, all nations with the exceptions of the host country and the "Big Five" (France, Germany, Italy, Spain and the United Kingdom) are required to qualify from one of two semi-finals in order to compete for the final; the top ten countries from each semi-final progress to the final. The European Broadcasting Union (EBU) split up the competing countries into six different pots based on voting patterns from previous contests, with countries with favourable voting histories put into the same pot. On 25 January 2012, a special allocation draw was held which placed each country into one of the two semi-finals, as well as which half of the show they would perform in. Macedonia was placed into the second semi-final, to be held on 24 May 2012, and was scheduled to perform in the first half of the show. The running order for the semi-finals was decided through another draw on 20 March 2012 and Macedonia was set to perform in position 2, following the entry from Serbia and before the entry from the Netherlands.

The two semi-finals and final were broadcast in Macedonia on MRT 1 and MRT Sat with commentary by Karolina Petkovska. The Macedonian spokesperson, who announced the Macedonian votes during the final, was Kristina Talevska.

=== Semi-final ===
Kaliopi took part in technical rehearsals on 15 and 18 May, followed by dress rehearsals on 23 and 24 May. This included the jury final where professional juries of each country watched and voted on the competing entries.

The Macedonian performance featured Kaliopi performing at the centre of the stage, flanked by two electric guitarists, a violinist, a cellist and a drummer around and behind the singer. The stage was dark at the beginning but lit up with black and white moving spotlights as the song progressed. The background LED screens displayed the interior of an opera house. The five musicians that joined Kaliopi on stage were Mario Stanković (guitar), Darko Veleski (guitar), Goran Mihajlovski (drums), Iris Stefanovska (cello) and Sanja Jovanovska (violin).

At the end of the show, Macedonia was announced as having finished in the top 10 and subsequently qualifying for the grand final. It was later revealed that Macedonia placed ninth in the semi-final, receiving a total of 53 points.

=== Final ===
Shortly after the second semi-final, a winners' press conference was held for the ten qualifying countries. As part of this press conference, the qualifying artists took part in a draw to determine the running order for the final. This draw was done in the order the countries appeared in the semi-final running order. Macedonia was drawn to perform in position 22, following the entry from Malta and before the entry from Ireland.

Kaliopi once again took part in dress rehearsals on 25 and 26 May before the final, including the jury final where the professional juries cast their final votes before the live show. Kaliopi performed a repeat of her semi-final performance during the final on 26 May. Macedonia placed thirteenth in the final, scoring 71 points.

=== Voting ===
Voting during the three shows consisted of 50 percent public televoting and 50 percent from a jury deliberation. The jury consisted of five music industry professionals who were citizens of the country they represent. This jury was asked to judge each contestant based on: vocal capacity; the stage performance; the song's composition and originality; and the overall impression by the act. In addition, no member of a national jury could be related in any way to any of the competing acts in such a way that they cannot vote impartially and independently.

Following the release of the full split voting by the EBU after the conclusion of the competition, it was revealed that Macedonia had placed eleventh with the public televote and seventeenth with the jury vote in the final. In the public vote, Macedonia scored 79 points, while with the jury vote, Macedonia scored 69 points. In the second semi-final, Macedonia placed eighth with the public televote with 63 points and ninth with the jury vote, scoring 58 points.

Below is a breakdown of points awarded to Macedonia and awarded by Macedonia in the second semi-final and grand final of the contest. The nation awarded its 12 points to Serbia in the semi-final and to Albania in the final of the contest.

==== Points awarded to Macedonia ====
Points awarded to Macedonia (Semi-final 2)
Score	Country
12 points	
10 points	
8 points	Bosnia and Herzegovina; Serbia; Turkey
7 points	Bulgaria; Croatia
6 points	Slovenia
5 points	Ukraine
4 points	
3 points	
2 points	Belarus
1 point	Georgia; Malta

Points awarded to Macedonia (Final)
Score	Country
12 points	Bosnia and Herzegovina; Serbia
10 points	
8 points	Albania; Croatia; Montenegro; Turkey
7 points	
6 points	Slovenia
5 points	
4 points	
3 points	Ukraine
2 points	Belarus; Bulgaria
1 point	Italy; Slovakia

==== Points awarded by Macedonia ====
Points awarded by Macedonia (Semi-final 2)
Score	Country
12 points	Serbia
10 points	Turkey
8 points	Sweden
7 points	Croatia
6 points	Bulgaria
5 points	Bosnia and Herzegovina
4 points	Slovenia
3 points	Ukraine
2 points	Malta
1 point	Belarus

Points awarded by Macedonia (Final)
Score	Country
12 points	Albania
10 points	Serbia
8 points	Turkey
7 points	Bosnia and Herzegovina
6 points	Sweden
5 points	Italy
4 points	Russia
3 points	Ukraine
2 points	Azerbaijan
1 point	Malta
