= Crno i belo =

2012 single by Kaliopi

Single by Kaliopi
- Released: 29 February 2012
- Recorded: 2012
- Genre: Pop; operatic pop
- Length: 3:00
- Label: Kaliopi Music Production
- Songwriter(s): Kaliopi, Romeo Grill
- Producer(s): Romeo Grill

Kaliopi singles chronology
"Poraka" (2011)	"Crno i belo" (2012)	"Vučica" (2012)
(North Macedonia) "Crno i belo"
Eurovision Song Contest 2012 entry
- Country: Macedonia
- Artist(s): Kaliopi
- Language: Macedonian
- Composer(s): Romeo Grill
- Lyricist(s): Kaliopi
Finals performance
- Semi-final result: 9th
- Semi-final points: 53 points
- Final result: 13th
- Final points: 71 points
Entry chronology
-

Crno i belo ("Black and White"; Macedonian: Црно и бело [ˈt͡sr̩nɔ i ˈbɛɫɔ]) is a song by Macedonian singer-songwriter Kaliopi. The song was written by Kaliopi and Romeo Grill and produced by Grill. It is best known as Macedonia's entry at the Eurovision Song Contest 2012 held in Baku, Azerbaijan. The song qualified Macedonia to the final evening of the competition after a preceding four-year period of non-qualifying entries. The song placed 13th in the competition with a total of 71 points, receiving twelve points from Bosnia and Herzegovina and Serbia.

== Background ==
On 19 November 2011, MRT invited Kaliopi to represent Macedonia at the Eurovision Song Contest 2012. After this announcement, Kaliopi and MRT held a press conference where Kaliopi revealed that she was unsure about what type of song she would take to the competition, but that she would consider her own compositions as well as those of her colleagues and international submissions. The instrumental composition for Crno i belo was sent to Kaliopi by former band member and ex-husband Romeo Grill, with whom she had extensively collaborated with previously on solo material, as well as decades prior when the band "Kaliopi" was still active. Kaliopi wrote lyrics for the composition and proceeded with recording the song in early 2012 with Grill at the MRT studio in Skopje.

== Eurovision Song Contest ==
On 29 February, in an hour and a half long program aired by MRT, Kaliopi was joined by musical guests from the region where she performed songs from her repertoire, as well as unveiling Crno i belo for the first time. In the same evening Kaliopi also performed the English version of the song, Black and White.

Macedonia was drawn to compete 2nd at the second semi-finals on 24 May. The song eventually advanced into the finals and was drawn to perform 22nd in the line-up. At the grand final, held on 26 May, the song eventually placed 13th, with 71 points. It scored the same as 12th placed Romania's Mandinga, but the latter earned points from more countries, causing Kaliopi to place 13th instead.

== Music video ==
The music video for "Crno i belo", directed by Aleksandar Ristovski - Princ, was filmed in Bitola. The video premiered on 17 March 2012. It is set in an empty theatre and abandoned building. Kaliopi performs the song with a piano on stage while supporting musicians are filmed at other locations. The video was submitted as the official preview video for Macedonia in the Eurovision Song Contest.

== Track listings ==
- Eurovision Promotional CD single
1. "Crno i belo" – 3:00
2. "Black and White" – 3:00

== Credits and personnel ==
- Kaliopi – vocals, songwriting
- Romeo Grill – songwriting, production, instrumentation, programming
- Thomas Frey - audio engineering at GMP Studio, Basel, Switzerland
- Georgi Hristovski - recording and audio mixing at M1 Studio, Skopje, Macedonia
- Darko Ilievski - recording and audio mixing at M1 Studio, Skopje, Macedonia
- Christoph Stickel - audio mastering at MSM Studio, Munich, Germany
- Lazar Cvetkovski - Guitarist
- Zoran Dzorlev - Violinist
