= Lithuania in the Eurovision Song Contest 2012 =

- Eurovision Song Contest 2012
- Country: Lithuania
- Selection process: "Eurovizijos" dainų konkurso nacionalinė atranka
- Selection date: 3 March 2012

Competing entry
- Song: "Love Is Blind"
- Artist: Donny Montell
- Songwriters: Brandon Stone; Jodie Rose

Placement
- Semi-final result: Qualified (3rd, 104 points)
- Final result: 14th, 70 points

Participation chronology

Lithuania was represented at the Eurovision Song Contest 2012 with the song "Love Is Blind", written by Brandon Stone and Jodie Rose. The song was performed by Donny Montell. The Lithuanian broadcaster Lithuanian National Radio and Television (LRT) organised the national final "Eurovizijos" dainų konkurso nacionalinė atranka (Eurovision Song Contest national selection) in order to select the Lithuanian entry for the 2012 contest in Baku, Azerbaijan. The national final took place over five weeks and involved 36 competing entries. In the final, fourteen entries remained and the winner was selected over two rounds of voting. In the first round, the combination of votes from a jury panel and a public vote selected the top three to qualify to the superfinal. In the superfinal, a jury vote entirely selected "Love Is Blind", performed by Donny Montell, as the winner.

Lithuania was drawn to compete in the second semi-final of the Eurovision Song Contest, which took place on 24 May 2012. Performing as the closing entry during the show in position 18, "Love Is Blind" was announced among the top 10 entries of the second semi-final and therefore qualified to compete in the final on 26 May. It was later revealed that Lithuania placed third out of the 18 participating countries in the semi-final with 104 points. In the final, Lithuania performed in position 26 and placed fourteenth out of the 26 participating countries with 70 points.

== Background ==
Prior to the 2012 contest, Lithuania had participated in the Eurovision Song Contest twelve times since its first entry in 1994. The nation's best placing in the contest was sixth, which it achieved in 2006 with the song "We Are the Winners", performed by LT United. Following the introduction of semi-finals in 2004, Lithuania, to this point, had managed to qualify to the final four times. In the 2011 contest, "C'est ma vie" performed by Evelina Sašenko qualified to the final, where the song scored 63 points and placed 19th.

For the 2012 contest, the Lithuanian national broadcaster, Lithuanian National Radio and Television (LRT), broadcast the event within Lithuania and organised the selection process for the nation's entry. Other than the internal selection of their debut entry in 1994, Lithuania has selected their entry consistently through a national final procedure. LRT confirmed their intentions to participate at the 2012 Eurovision Song Contest on 11 September 2011 and announced the organization of "Eurovizijos" dainų konkurso nacionalinė atranka, which would be the national final to select Lithuania's entry for Baku.

== Before Eurovision ==
=== "Eurovizijos" dainų konkurso nacionalinė atranka ===
"Eurovizijos" dainų konkurso nacionalinė atranka (Eurovision Song Contest national selection) was the national final format developed by LRT in order to select Lithuania's entry for the Eurovision Song Contest 2012. The competition involved a five-week-long process that commenced on 4 February 2012 and concluded with a winning song and artist on 3 March 2012. The five shows took place at the LRT studios in Vilnius and were hosted by Liepa Rimkevičienė and Darius Užkuraitis. The shows were broadcast on LTV, LTV World, and Lietuvos Radijas, as well as online via the broadcaster's website lrt.lt. The final was also streamed online on the official Eurovision Song Contest website eurovision.tv.

==== Format ====
The 2012 competition involved 36 entries and consisted of five shows. The first four shows were the semi-finals, consisting of nine entries each. The top three entries from each semi-final proceeded to the final, while two wildcard acts were also selected for the final out of the remaining non-qualifying acts from the semi-finals. The two wildcards were selected by the public through two separate voting platforms, one on the Balsuok! mobile application and one on the website of the mineral water brand Akvilė. Viewers using the Balsuok! app during the four shows were able to select the "for" or "against" option for each entry, and the song that received the most "for" votes received the Balsuok! wildcard. In the final, the winner was selected from the remaining fourteen entries over two rounds of voting. The first round results selected the top three entries, while the second round determined the winner. Monetary prizes were also awarded to the top three artists. The winner received 15,000 LTL, while the second place received 10,000 LTL and the third place received 5,000 LTL. The winning artist(s) were awarded an additional 10,000 LTL sponsored by Akvilė in order to assist in their preparation for the Eurovision Song Contest.

The results of each of the five shows were determined by a jury panel and public televoting. The qualifiers during the semi-finals and the first round of the final were determined by the 50/50 combination of votes from the jury and public. The ranking developed by both streams of voting was converted to points from 1–8, 10 and 12 and assigned based on the number of competing songs in the respective show. The public could vote through telephone and SMS voting. Ties were decided in favour of the entry that received the most points from the jury. In the second round of the final, only the jury voted.

==== Competing entries ====
LRT opened a submission period on 14 October 2011 for artists and songwriters to submit their entries with the deadline on 31 December 2011. On 5 January 2012, LRT announced the 47 entries selected for the competition from over 100 submissions received. The final changes to the list of 47 competing acts were later made with only 36 entries ultimately participating in the competition.

Artist	Song	Songwriter(s)
Alive Way	"Amazed by You"	Justinas Stanislovaitis
Beissoul	"Why"	Darius Julka
Bekešo Vilkai	"Letter by Letter"	Jievaras Jasinskis, Girmantė Vaitkutė
Chill Out, Have No Doubt	"Until the End"	Vytautas Karpauskas, Gražina Guobužaitė
DAR	"Home"	Gorgi, Arvydas Martinėnas
Diana Jasilionytė	"Dear Someone"	Vytautas Bikus
Donata Virbilaitė	"Superman"	Andreas Anastasiou, Gorgi
Donatas Šimkus-Dūmas	"Party All Day"	Arvydas Martinėnas, Rūta Lukoševičiūtė
Donny Montell	"Love Is Blind"	Brandon Stone, Jodie Rose
Gražvydas Sidiniauskas	"When I Say Yes"	Gražvydas Sidiniauskas
Greta Jorudaitė	"Show Me What You Got"	Emanuel Gonzalez, Elen Jay
Greta Šmidt	"The One"	Greta Šmidt
Indigo	"Sugrįžk"	Rūta Lukoševičiūtė, Igoris Barinas
Jurijus Veklenko	"Tu ne viena"	Edgaras Lubys
Kamilė Kielaitė	"Try"	Kamilė Kielaitė
Katažina	"Euforija"	Deivydas Zvonkus
LadyBell	"Mano muzika"	Andrius Bernatonis, Aleksandras Latuškinas
Laiptai	"Ašarų lietus"	Audronis Grincevičius, Vaidas Dzežulskis
Laisva	"Nutolk"	Deivydas Zvonkus
Laura J and Stiga	"Fading in the Mist"	Mindaugas Stiga, Jonas Krivickas
Liepa	"Viena"	Liepa Mondeikaitė
Martynas Beinaris	"Bella Donna"	Martynas Beinaris
Merlin	"Wheel of Time"	Rodion Kolomin, Feliks Kutka
Monika	"Happy"	Edgaras Lubys, Marius Leskauskas
Multiks	"Star"	Paulius Burba
Sati	"Light Is the One"	Edgaras Lubys
Simona Milinytė	"One of a Kind"	Fredrik Westin, Bobby Ljunggren, Marcos Ubeda
Sound's Engineers feat. Natalie	"Blind"	Vitalijus Lipovecas, Natalja Chareckaja
Sweetsalt	"My Love"	Rokas Dobunžinskas
The Artrace	"Fly LT"	Aurimas Galvelis, Justas Kulikauskas, GEnerG
The Independent	"Baby"	Kipras Varaneckas
Thundertale	"Heroes, Arise!"	Laurynas Baškys, Jonas Chockevičius
Vaida feat. Movetron	"Medieval Love"	Jukka Tanttari, Timo Löyvä
Valdas Maksvytis	"Dar laiko yra"	Romas Michailovskis, Valdas Maksvyti
VIG Roses	"Come Back Home"	Giedrė Girnytė, Arūnas Rakšnys
Vytautas Matuzas	"Take It Back"	Vytautas Matuzas, Linas Adomaitis

==== Jury members ====
The jury panel in the semi-finals and the final consisted of five members.

Jury members by show
Jury member	Semi-finals				Final	Occupation(s)
Jury member	1	2	3	4	Final	Occupation(s)
Aras Vėberis	No	No	No	Yes	No	producer
Arnoldas Lukošius	No	No	Yes	No	No	musician
Artūras Novikas	No	No	No	No	Yes	composer
Karolis Ramoška	No	Yes	No	No	No	radio host
Laurynas Šarkinas	No	No	Yes	Yes	Yes	musician, drummer for the group Saulės kliošas
Merūnas Vitulskis	Yes	Yes	No	No	No	singer
Raigardas Tautkus	Yes	Yes	Yes	Yes	No	composer
Rosita Čivilytė	Yes	No	No	Yes	Yes	singer
Saulius Urbonavičius	Yes	Yes	Yes	No	No	television and music producer
Vladimiras Prudnikovas	Yes	Yes	Yes	No	Yes	opera singing professor
Vytautas Miškinis	No	No	No	Yes	Yes	director of the "Ąžuoliukas" choir

==== Semi-finals ====
The four semi-finals of the competition aired on 4, 11, 18, and 25 February 2012 and featured nine competing entries each. The top three entries from each semi-final advanced to the final, while the bottom six were eliminated.

On 26 February 2012, "The One" performed by Greta Šmidt was announced to have received the most positive reactions on the Balsuok! app (164,252 "for" votes) and was awarded a wildcard to also proceed to the final. On 28 February 2012, "Light Is the One" performed by Sati was announced to have received the most votes on the Akvilė online voting platform (46,028 votes) and was also awarded a wildcard to proceed to the final.

Key

Qualifier Wildcard qualifier

Semi-final 1 – 4 February 2012
R/O	Artist	Song	Jury		Televote		Total	Place
R/O	Artist	Song	Votes	Points	Votes	Points	Total	Place
1	The Independent	"Baby"	39	10	484	8	18	2
2	Kamilė Kielaitė	"Try"	31	8	151	4	12	5
3	Multiks	"Star"	28	7	549	10	17	3
4	Valdas Maksvytis	"Dar laiko yra"	20	3	396	7	10	7
5	Chill Out, Have No Doubt	"Until the End"	26	4	316	6	10	6
6	The Artrace	"Fly LT"	33	8	199	5	13	4
7	Indigo	"Sugrįžk"	43	6	121	2	8	8
8	Laisva	"Nutolk"	29	5	131	3	8	9
9	Beissoul	"Why"	43	12	895	12	24	1

Detailed Jury Votes
R/O	Song	V. Prudnikovas	R. Čivilytė	M. Vitulskis	R. Tautkus	S. Urbonavičius	Total
1	"Baby"	9	8	6	8	8	39
2	"Try"	7	7	7	7	5	31
3	"Star"	7	6	5	8	5	28
4	"Dar laiko yra"	5	4	3	5	3	20
5	"Until the End"	7	5	5	5	4	26
6	"Fly LT"	7	5	5	8	8	33
7	"Sugrizk"	5	7	5	7	5	43
8	"Nutolk"	6	6	5	6	5	29
9	"Why"	8	9	8	9	9	43

Semi-final 2 – 11 February 2012
R/O	Artist	Song	Jury		Televote		Total	Place
R/O	Artist	Song	Votes	Points	Votes	Points	Total	Place
1	Sweetsalt	"My Love"	30	5	218	3	8	8
2	Diana Jasilionytė	"Dear Someone"	36	8	1,047	7	15	4
3	Martynas Beinaris	"Bella Donna"	26	4	687	6	10	7
4	Alive Way	"Amazed by You"	41	12	1,149	8	20	2
5	Sati	"Light Is the One"	33	6	222	4	10	6
6	Vytautas Matuzas	"Take It Back"	40	10	1,923	12	22	1
7	Katažina	"Euforija"	34	7	1,703	10	17	3
8	Laura J and Stiga	"Fading in the Mist"	25	3	110	2	5	9
9	Jurijus Veklenko	"Tu ne viena"	34	7	241	5	12	5

Detailed Jury Votes
R/O	Song	V. Prudnikovas	K. Ramoška	M. Vitulskis	R. Tautkus	S. Urbonavičius	Total
1	"My Love"	5	7	5	6	7	30
2	"Dear Someone"	7	8	7	7	7	36
3	"Bella Donna"	8	6	4	4	4	26
4	"Amazed by You"	8	9	7	8	9	41
5	"Light Is the One"	7	7	6	6	6	33
6	"Take It Back"	9	9	7	7	8	40
7	"Euforija"	7	7	6	7	7	34
8	"Fading in the Mist"	6	6	3	4	4	25
9	"Tu ne viena"	6	7	7	7	7	34

Semi-final 3 – 18 February 2012
R/O	Artist	Song	Jury		Televote		Total	Place
R/O	Artist	Song	Votes	Points	Votes	Points	Total	Place
1	Thundertale	"Heroes, Arise!"	27	3	631	6	9	8
2	Sound's Engineers feat. Natalie	"Blind"	33	7	157	2	9	6
3	Donatas Šimkus-Dūmas	"Party All Day"	33	7	1,049	8	15	4
4	VIG Roses	"Come Back Home"	35	8	1,073	10	18	2
5	Bekešo Vilkai	"Letter by Letter"	42	10	918	7	17	3
6	Greta Jorudaitė	"Show Me What You Got"	31	4	303	5	9	7
7	Liepa	"Viena"	32	6	168	4	10	5
8	Gražvydas Sidiniauskas	"When I Say Yes"	31	5	159	3	8	9
9	Monika	"Happy"	43	12	1,416	12	24	1

Detailed Jury Votes
R/O	Song	V. Prudnikovas	A. Lukošius	R. Tautkus	L. Šarkinas	S. Urbonavičius	Total
1	"Heroes, Arise!"	6	5	6	5	5	27
2	"Blind"	6	7	7	7	6	33
3	"Party All Day"	7	6	7	7	6	33
4	"Come Back Home"	6	6	7	8	8	35
5	"Letter by Letter"	8	8	8	9	9	42
6	"Show Me What You Got"	5	5	6	6	6	31
7	"Viena"	6	6	6	7	7	32
8	"When I Say Yes"	6	6	6	7	6	31
9	"Happy"	9	8	9	9	8	43

Semi-final 4 – 25 February 2012
R/O	Artist	Song	Jury		Televote		Total	Place
R/O	Artist	Song	Votes	Points	Votes	Points	Total	Place
1	Merlin	"Wheel of Time"	34	7	123	4	11	4
2	LadyBell	"Mano muzika"	32	5	137	5	10	5
3	Donata Virbilaitė	"Superman"	33	6	97	3	9	8
4	Laiptai	"Ašarų lietus"	31	4	358	6	10	6
5	Greta Šmidt	"The One"	30	3	522	7	10	7
6	Vaida feat. Movetron	"Medieval Love"	27	2	51	2	4	9
7	DAR	"Home"	42	10	2,122	8	18	2
8	Simona Milinytė	"One of a Kind"	37	8	2,173	10	18	3
9	Donny Montell	"Love Is Blind"	50	12	6,541	12	24	1

Detailed Jury Votes
R/O	Song	V. Prudnikovas	R. Čivilytė	M. Vitulskis	R. Tautkus	S. Urbonavičius	Total
1	"Wheel of Time"	6	7	7	7	7	34
2	"Mano muzika"	6	6	7	7	6	32
3	"Superman"	6	6	7	7	7	33
4	"Ašarų lietus"	7	6	6	6	6	31
5	"The One"	6	5	7	6	6	30
6	"Medieval Love"	5	5	5	6	6	27
7	"Home"	9	8	8	9	8	42
8	"One of a Kind"	7	7	8	8	7	37
9	"Love Is Blind"	10	10	10	10	10	50

==== Final ====
The final of the competition took place on 3 March 2012 and featured the remaining fourteen entries that qualified from the semi-finals. The final was the only show in the competition to be broadcast live; all other preceding shows were pre-recorded earlier in the week before their airdates. The winner was selected over two rounds of voting. In the first round, the three entries that gained the most points from the jury vote and the public vote advanced to the superfinal, while the bottom eleven were eliminated. In the superfinal, "Love Is Blind" performed by Donny Montell was selected as the winner after gaining the most points from the jurors. In addition to the performances of the competing entries, interval acts included Anggun performing the 2012 French entry "Echo (You and I)", Kurt Calleja performing the 2012 Maltese entry "This Is the Night", and Gaitana performing the 2012 Ukrainian entry "Be My Guest".

Final – 3 March 2012
R/O	Artist	Song	Jury		Televote		Total	Place
R/O	Artist	Song	Votes	Points	Votes	Points	Total	Place
1	The Independent	"Baby"	32	2	333	0	2	12
2	Alive Way	"Amazed by You"	34	4	352	1	5	9
3	Greta Šmidt	"The One"	32	2	344	0	2	11
4	Sati	"Light Is the One"	31	1	262	0	1	13
5	Vytautas Matuzas	"Take It Back"	37	5	3,090	6	11	6
6	Monika	"Happy"	41	7	5,224	8	15	3
7	VIG Roses	"Come Back Home"	33	3	659	4	7	8
8	Multiks	"Star"	26	0	379	0	0	14
9	Katažina	"Euforija"	32	2	478	2	4	10
10	Simona Milinytė	"One of a Kind"	31	1	4,092	7	8	7
11	Beissoul	"Why"	39	6	1,739	5	11	5
12	Bekešo Vilkai	"Letter by Letter"	44	8	569	3	11	4
13	Donny Montell	"Love Is Blind"	50	12	15,664	12	24	1
14	DAR	"Home"	46	10	11,004	10	20	2

Detailed Jury Votes
R/O	Song	V. Miškinis	R. Čivilytė	V. Prudnikovas	L. Šarkinas	A. Novikas	Total
1	"Baby"	5	8	6	7	6	32
2	"Amazed by You"	8	7	7	7	5	34
3	"The One"	7	6	6	7	6	32
4	"Light Is the One"	6	7	6	7	5	31
5	"Take It Back"	8	8	7	7	7	37
6	"Happy"	7	9	8	9	8	41
7	"Come Back Home"	7	6	6	7	7	33
8	"Star"	6	5	5	6	4	26
9	"Euforija"	7	6	6	6	7	32
10	"One of a Kind"	6	6	6	6	7	31
11	"Why"	8	8	8	8	7	39
12	"Letter by Letter"	9	9	9	9	8	44
13	"Love Is Blind"	10	10	10	10	10	50
14	"Home"	9	9	9	9	10	46

Superfinal – 3 March 2012
R/O	Artist	Song	Place
1	Monika	"Happy"	3
2	Donny Montell	"Love Is Blind"	1
3	DAR	"Home"	2

=== Preparation ===
On 1 May, LRT broadcast the support concert Būkime kartu, where Lithuanian viewers could call to donate funds to support the Lithuanian Eurovision participation. The concert featured guests Edmundas Seilius, Kristina Zmailaitė, Sasha Song, Linas Adomaitis, Monika Linkyte, Rosita Čivilytė, Kastytis Kerbedis, and Aistė Petkevičiūtė, and raised 80,000 LTL from public donations.

=== Promotion ===
Donny Montell specifically promoted "Love Is Blind" as the Lithuanian Eurovision entry on 21 April 2012 by performing during the Eurovision in Concert event, which was held at the Melkweg venue in Amsterdam, Netherlands, and hosted by Ruth Jacott and Cornald Maas.

== At Eurovision ==
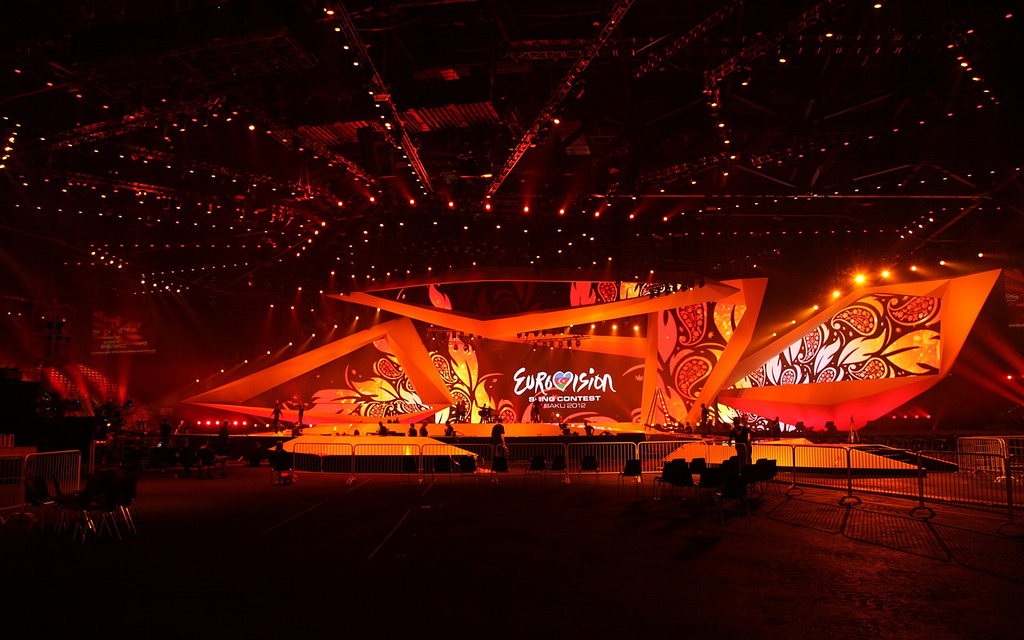
The Eurovision Song Contest 2012 took place at the Baku Crystal Hall in Baku, Azerbaijan

According to Eurovision rules, all nations with the exceptions of the host country and the "Big Five" (France, Germany, Italy, Spain and the United Kingdom) are required to qualify from one of two semi-finals in order to compete for the final; the top ten countries from each semi-final progress to the final. The European Broadcasting Union (EBU) split up the competing countries into six different pots based on voting patterns from previous contests, with countries with favourable voting histories put into the same pot. On 25 January 2012, an allocation draw was held which placed each country into one of the two semi-finals, as well as which half of the show they would perform in. Lithuania was placed into the second semi-final, to be held on 24 May 2012, and was scheduled to perform in the second half of the show. The running order for the semi-finals was decided through another draw on 20 March 2012. As one of the five wildcard countries, Lithuania chose to perform last in position 18, following the entry from Bosnia and Herzegovina.

The two semi-finals and final were broadcast in Lithuania on LTV and LTV World with commentary by Darius Užkuraitis. The Lithuanian spokesperson who announced the Lithuanian votes during the final was Ignas Krupavičius.

=== Semi-final ===
Donny Montell took part in technical rehearsals on 15 and 18 May, followed by dress rehearsals on 23 and 24 May. This included the jury final, where the professional juries of each country watched and voted on the competing entries.

The Lithuanian performance featured Donny Montell performing on stage alone with blue stage colours and began with Montell having his eyes covered by a blindfold decorated with crystal stones. Later during the performance, Montell took the blindfold off and did a somersault with the LED screens displaying dancing silhouettes. The performance also featured smoke effects. In regards to the crystals on the blindfold, Donny Montell stated: "Eyes are very important in the performance. If they are covered, something has to sparkle. Crystals are the mirror of my thoughts."

At the end of the show, Lithuania was announced as having finished in the top 10 and subsequently qualifying for the grand final. It was later revealed that Lithuania placed third in the semi-final, receiving a total of 104 points.

=== Final ===
Shortly after the second semi-final, a winners' press conference was held for the ten qualifying countries. As part of this press conference, the qualifying artists took part in a draw to determine the running order for the final. This draw was done in the order the countries appeared in the semi-final running order. Lithuania was drawn to perform in position 4, following the entry from Albania and before the entry from Bosnia and Herzegovina.

Donny Montell once again took part in dress rehearsals on 25 and 26 May before the final, including the jury final, where the professional juries cast their final votes before the live show. Donny Montell performed a repeat of his semi-final performance during the final on 26 May. Lithuania placed fourteenth in the final, scoring 70 points.

=== Voting ===
Voting during the three shows consisted of 50 percent public televoting and 50 percent from a jury deliberation. The jury consisted of five music industry professionals who were citizens of the country they represent. This jury was asked to judge each contestant based on: vocal capacity; the stage performance; the song's composition and originality; and the overall impression by the act. In addition, no member of a national jury could be related in any way to any of the competing acts in such a way that they cannot vote impartially and independently.

Following the release of the full split voting by the EBU after the conclusion of the competition, it was revealed that Lithuania had placed fourteenth with both the public televote and the jury vote in the final. In the public vote, Lithuania scored 68 points, while with the jury vote, Lithuania scored 82 points. In the second semi-final, Lithuania placed third with the public televote with 128 points and tenth with the jury vote, scoring 55 points.

Below is a breakdown of points awarded to Lithuania and awarded by Lithuania in the second semi-final and grand final of the contest. The nation awarded its 12 points to Georgia in the semi-final and to Azerbaijan in the final of the contest.

==== Points awarded to Lithuania ====
Points awarded to Lithuania (Semi-final 2)
Score	Country
12 points	
10 points	Belarus; Estonia; Malta; United Kingdom
8 points	
7 points	Norway; Portugal; Slovakia; Slovenia
6 points	Serbia
5 points	France; Georgia
4 points	Bulgaria; Croatia; Netherlands; Ukraine
3 points	
2 points	Sweden; Turkey
1 point	

Points awarded to Lithuania (Final)
Score	Country
12 points	Georgia
10 points	
8 points	Belarus
7 points	Ireland; United Kingdom
6 points	Norway
5 points	Bulgaria; Russia
4 points	Azerbaijan; Latvia; Malta
3 points	Estonia; France
2 points	
1 point	Montenegro; Netherlands

==== Points awarded by Lithuania ====
Points awarded by Lithuania (Semi-final 2)
Score	Country
12 points	Georgia
10 points	Sweden
8 points	Estonia
7 points	Belarus
6 points	Malta
5 points	Ukraine
4 points	Norway
3 points	Netherlands
2 points	Serbia
1 point	Portugal

Points awarded by Lithuania (Final)
Score	Country
12 points	Azerbaijan
10 points	Sweden
8 points	Estonia
7 points	Malta
6 points	Russia
5 points	Serbia
4 points	Italy
3 points	Germany
2 points	Ukraine
1 point	Turkey
