= United Kingdom in the Eurovision Song Contest 2012 =

- Eurovision Song Contest 2012
- Participating broadcaster: British Broadcasting Corporation (BBC)
- Country: United Kingdom
- Selection process: Internal selection
- Announcement date: Artist: 1 March 2012; Song: 19 March 2012

Competing entry
- Song: "Love Will Set You Free"
- Artist: Engelbert Humperdinck
- Songwriters: Martin Terefe; Sacha Skarbek

Placement
- Final result: 25th, 12 points

Participation chronology

The United Kingdom was represented at the Eurovision Song Contest 2012 with the song "Love Will Set You Free" written by Martin Terefe and Sacha Skarbek, and performed by Engelbert Humperdinck. The British participating broadcaster, the British Broadcasting Corporation (BBC), internally selected both the song and the performer. Humperdinck was announced as the British entrant on 1 March 2012, while the song "Love Will Set You Free" was presented to the public on 19 March 2012.

As a member of the "Big Five", the United Kingdom automatically qualified to compete in the final of the Eurovision Song Contest. Performing as the opening entry for the show in position 1, the United Kingdom placed 25th out of the 26 participating countries with 12 points.

== Background ==
Prior to the 2012 contest, the British Broadcasting Corporation (BBC) had participated in the Eurovision Song Contest representing the United Kingdom fifty-four times. Thus far, it has won the contest five times: in 1967 with the song "Puppet on a String" performed by Sandie Shaw, in 1969 with the song "Boom Bang-a-Bang" performed by Lulu, in 1976 with the song "Save Your Kisses for Me" performed by Brotherhood of Man, in 1981 with the song "Making Your Mind Up" performed by Bucks Fizz, and in 1997 with the song "Love Shine a Light" performed by Katrina and the Waves. To this point, the nation is noted for having finished as the runner-up in a record fifteen contests. Up to and including 1998, the UK had only twice finished outside the top 10, in 1978 and 1987. Since 1999, the year in which the rule was abandoned that songs must be performed in one of the official languages of the country participating, the UK has had less success, thus far only finishing within the top ten twice: in 2002 with the song "Come Back" performed by Jessica Garlick and in 2009 with the song "It's My Time" performed by Jade Ewen. For the 2011 contest, the United Kingdom finished in eleventh place out of twenty-five competing entries with the song "I Can" performed by the group Blue.

As part of its duties as participating broadcaster, the BBC organises the selection of its entry in the Eurovision Song Contest and broadcasts the event in the country. The broadcaster announced that it would participate in the 2012 contest on 20 December 2011. BBC has traditionally organised a national final featuring a competition among several artists and songs to choose the British entry for Eurovision. In 2011, BBC opted to internally select the British entry for the first time since its first entry in 1957, a selection procedure that continued for their 2012 entry.

== Before Eurovision ==
=== Internal selection ===
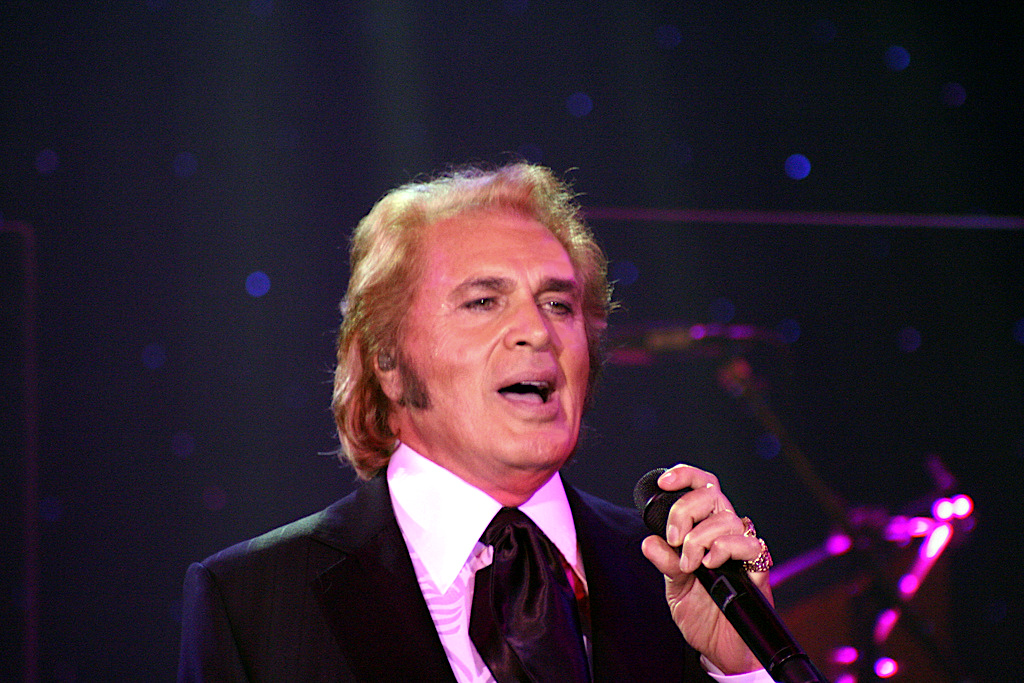
Engelbert Humperdinck was internally selected to represent the United Kingdom in the Eurovision Song Contest 2012

On 1 March 2012, BBC announced that the British entry for the Eurovision Song Contest 2012 would be selected internally. On the same day, Engelbert Humperdinck was revealed as the British entrant for the Eurovision Song Contest 2012. Prior to the announcement of Engelbert Humperdinck as the British representative, artists that were rumoured in the media included the group Atomic Kitten and singers Adele and Tom Jones.

On 19 March 2012, the song "Love Will Set You Free" written by Martin Terefe and Sacha Skarbek was presented to the public via the release of the official music video via BBC's Eurovision Song Contest website bbc.co.uk/eurovision and the official Eurovision Song Contest website eurovision.tv. In regards to the song, Humperdinck stated: "I have my eyes on the prize with my song 'Love Will Set You Free'. I'm very proud of the song and with the nation behind me, I feel ready and look forward to the rollercoaster ride that is Eurovision!"

=== Promotion ===
To specifically promote "Love Will Set You Free" as the British Eurovision entry, on 11 May, Engelbert Humperdinck was part of the guest line-up for the BBC One programme The Graham Norton Show where he performed "Love Will Set You Free" live and was interviewed by host Graham Norton.

== At Eurovision ==
According to Eurovision rules, all nations with the exceptions of the host country and the "Big Five" (France, Germany, Italy, Spain and the United Kingdom) are required to compete in one of two semi-finals, and qualify in order to participate in the final; the top ten countries from each semi-final progress to the final. As a member of the "Big 5", the United Kingdom automatically qualified to compete in the final on 26 May 2012. In addition to their participation in the final, the United Kingdom is also required to broadcast and vote in one of the two semi-finals. During the semi-final allocation draw on 25 January 2012, the United Kingdom was assigned to broadcast and vote in the second semi-final on 24 May 2012.

In the United Kingdom, the semi-finals were broadcast on BBC Three with commentary by Scott Mills and Sara Cox. The final was televised on BBC One with commentary by Graham Norton and broadcast on BBC Radio 2 with commentary by Ken Bruce. The British spokesperson, who announced the British votes during the final, was Scott Mills.

=== Final ===
Engelbert Humperdinck took part in technical rehearsals on 19 and 20 May, followed by dress rehearsals on 25 and 26 May. This included the jury final on 25 May where the professional juries of each country watched and voted on the competing entries. During the running order draw on 20 March which determined the running order of the British entry in the final, United Kingdom was drawn to perform first in position 1, before the entry from Hungary.

The British performance featured Engelbert Humperdinck performing on stage with the LED screens displaying lighting that transitioned from black and white to a blaze of red. The performance began with Humperdinck performing on a dimly lit stage silhouetted in the spotlight before the lighting gradually increased to reveal a male and female classical ballet dancer, Shem Jacobs and Bethany-Rose Harrison, and a guitarist, James Bryan, who sat on a stool behind Humperdinck. The performance was concluded with several effects including spinning fireworks and a pyrotechnic waterfall. The United Kingdom placed twenty-fifth in the final, scoring 12 points.

=== Voting ===
Voting during the three shows involved each country awarding points from 1–8, 10 and 12 as determined by a combination of 50% national jury and 50% televoting. Each nation's jury consisted of five music industry professionals who are citizens of the country they represent. This jury judged each entry based on: vocal capacity; the stage performance; the song's composition and originality; and the overall impression by the act. In addition, no member of a national jury was permitted to be related in any way to any of the competing acts in such a way that they cannot vote impartially and independently. The following members comprised the British jury: Kevin Hughes (radio DJ), Doug Flett (songwriter), Daffyd Rhys Evans (singer-songwriter), Kirsten Joy Child (singer-songwriter) and Lynsey de Paul (singer, represented United Kingdom in the 1977 Contest).

Following the release of the full split voting by the EBU after the conclusion of the competition, it was revealed that the United Kingdom had placed twenty-first with the public televote and twenty-sixth (last) with the jury vote. In the public vote, the United Kingdom scored 36 points and in the jury vote the nation scored 11 points.

Below is a breakdown of points awarded to the United Kingdom and awarded by United Kingdom in the second semi-final and grand final of the contest. The nation awarded its 12 points to Malta in the semi-final and to Sweden in the final of the contest.

==== Points awarded to the United Kingdom ====
Points awarded to the United Kingdom (Final)
Score	Country
12 points	
10 points	
8 points	
7 points	
6 points	
5 points	Estonia
4 points	Ireland
3 points	
2 points	Latvia
1 point	Belgium

==== Points awarded by the United Kingdom ====
Points awarded by the United Kingdom (Semi-final 2)
Score	Country
12 points	Malta
10 points	Lithuania
8 points	Sweden
7 points	Estonia
6 points	Turkey
5 points	Bulgaria
4 points	Netherlands
3 points	Serbia
2 points	Ukraine
1 point	Bosnia and Herzegovina

Points awarded by the United Kingdom (Final)
Score	Country
12 points	Sweden
10 points	Ireland
8 points	Spain
7 points	Lithuania
6 points	Germany
5 points	Malta
4 points	Estonia
3 points	Russia
2 points	Azerbaijan
1 point	Turkey

==== Detailed voting results from the United Kingdom ====
Source:

==== Semi-final 2 ====
Jury points awarded in second semi-final:

Points awarded by the United Kingdom Jury (Semi-final 2)
Score	Country
12 points	Malta
10 points	Estonia
8 points	Ukraine
7 points	Sweden
6 points	Bosnia and Herzegovina
5 points	Serbia
4 points	Slovenia
3 points	Netherlands
2 points	Lithuania
1 point	Norway

==== Final ====
Jury points awarded in the final:

Points awarded by the United Kingdom Jury (Final)
Score	Country
12 points	Spain
10 points	Estonia
8 points	Malta
7 points	Azerbaijan
6 points	Sweden
5 points	Germany
4 points	Ukraine
3 points	Serbia
2 points	Norway
1 point	Denmark

== After Eurovision ==
The final of the Eurovision Song Contest 2012 was watched by an average of 7.47 million viewers in the United Kingdom with a market share of 36.2%, 2 million less than the previous year although the show faced additional competition from an England friendly football match. After the contest, several British media personalities had called upon the BBC for a withdrawal, including Phillip Schofield who described the competition as "political".
