= Malta in the Eurovision Song Contest 2012 =

- Eurovision Song Contest 2012
- Participating broadcaster: Public Broadcasting Services (PBS)
- Country: Malta
- Selection process: Malta Eurovision Song Contest 2012
- Selection date: 4 February 2012

Competing entry
- Song: "This Is the Night"
- Artist: Kurt Calleja
- Songwriters: Johan Jämtberg; Kurt Calleja; Mikael Gunnerås

Placement
- Semi-final result: Qualified (7th, 70 points)
- Final result: 21st, 41 points

Participation chronology

Malta was represented at the Eurovision Song Contest 2012 with the song "This Is the Night" written by Johan Jämtberg, Kurt Calleja and Mikael Gunnerås. The song was performed by Kurt Calleja. The Maltese entry for the 2012 contest in Baku, Azerbaijan was selected through the national final Malta Eurovision Song Contest 2012, organised by the Maltese broadcaster Public Broadcasting Services (PBS). The competition consisted of a semi-final round and a final, held on 3 and 4 February 2012, respectively, where "This Is the Night" performed by Kurt Calleja eventually emerged as the winning entry after scoring the most points from a six-member jury and a public televote.

Malta was drawn to compete in the second semi-final of the Eurovision Song Contest which took place on 24 May 2012. Performing during the show in position 4, "This Is the Night" was announced among the top 10 entries of the second semi-final and therefore qualified to compete in the final on 26 May. It was later revealed that Malta placed seventh out of the 18 participating countries in the semi-final with 70 points. In the final, Malta performed in position 21 and placed twenty-first out of the 26 participating countries, scoring 41 points.

== Background ==
Prior to the 2012 contest, Malta had participated in the Eurovision Song Contest twenty-four times since its first entry in 1971. Malta briefly competed in the Eurovision Song Contest in the 1970s before withdrawing for sixteen years. The country had, to this point, competed in every contest since returning in 1991. Malta's best placing in the contest thus far was second, which it achieved on two occasions: in 2002 with the song "7th Wonder" performed by Ira Losco and in the 2005 contest with the song "Angel" performed by Chiara. In the 2011 edition, Malta failed to qualify to the final with the song "One Life" performed by Glen Vella.

For the 2012 contest, the Maltese national broadcaster, Public Broadcasting Services (PBS), broadcast the event within Malta and organised the selection process for the nation's entry. PBS confirmed their intentions to participate at it on 27 August 2011. Malta selected their entry consistently through a national final procedure, a method that was continued for their 2012 participation.

== Before Eurovision ==
=== Malta Eurovision Song Contest 2012 ===
Malta Eurovision Song Contest 2012 was the national final format developed by PBS to select the Maltese entry for the Eurovision Song Contest 2012. The competition consisted of a semi-final and final held on 3 and 4 February 2012, respectively, at the Malta Fairs & Conventions Centre in Ta' Qali. Both shows were hosted by Ronald Briffa and Elaine Saliba with backstage commentary and interviews by Frank Zammit and broadcast on Television Malta (TVM) as well on the broadcaster's website tvm.com.mt, while the final was also broadcast in Azerbaijan on İctimai Television (İTV) and on the official Eurovision Song Contest website eurovision.tv.

==== Format ====
The competition consisted of twenty-four songs competing in the semi-final on 3 February 2012 where the top sixteen entries qualified to compete in the final on 4 February 2012. Six judges evaluated the songs during the shows and each judge had an equal stake in the final result. The results of the public televote had a weighting equal to the votes of two judges. Ties in the final results were broken based on the entry which received the higher score from the judges. The six members of the jury that evaluated the entries during both the semi-final and final consisted of:

- İsmail Güngör (Turkey) – Head of Delegation for Turkey at the Eurovision Song Contest
- Francesca Vella (Malta) – Journalist
- Julian Vignoles (Ireland) – Head of Delegation for Ireland at the Eurovision Song Contest
- Bruno Berberes (France) – Head of Delegation for France at the Eurovision Song Contest
- Nicola Caligiore (Italy) – Head of Delegation for Italy at the Eurovision Song Contest
- Keith Demicoli (Malta) – Journalist and television presenter

==== Competing entries ====
Artists and composers were able to submit their entries between 27 August 2011 and 20 October 2011. Songwriters from any nationality were able to submit songs as long as the artist were Maltese or possessed Maltese citizenship. Artists were able to submit as many songs as they wished, however, they could only compete with a maximum of two in the semi-final and one in the final. In addition to the public submissions, PBS reserved the right to directly award wildcards to compete in the selection process. Former national final winners Olivia Lewis, Morena, Chiara, Thea Garrett and Glen Vella were unable to compete due to a rule that prevented the previous five winners from competing in the following competition. 161 entries were received by the broadcaster. On 10 November 2011, PBS announced a shortlist of 62 entries that had progressed through the selection process. The twenty-four songs selected to compete in the semi-final were announced on the TVM programme Xarabank on 25 November 2011. Among the selected competing artists was former Maltese Eurovision entrant Fabrizio Faniello who represented Malta in the 2001 and 2006 contests.

==== Semi-final ====
The semi-final took place on 3 February 2012. Twenty-four songs competed for sixteen qualifying spots in the final. The running order for the semi-final was announced on 19 January 2012. The show was opened with a guest performance by the 2011 Maltese Eurovision entrant Glen Vella, while the interval act featured performances by 2012 Swiss Eurovision entrants Sinplus performing "Unbreakable" and the local band Airport Impressions.

Semi-final – 3 February 2012
R/O	Artist	Song	Songwriter(s)	Result
1	Danica Muscat	"7 Days"	Philip Vella	Advanced
2	J. Anvil	"You Are My Life"	George Platon	Advanced
3	Isabelle Zammit	"Walk on Water"	Paul Giordimaina, Fleur Balzan	—N/a
4	Francesca Borg	"Take Me Far"	Marco Debono, Doris Chetcuti	Advanced
5	Klinsmann	"No Way Back"	Paul Abela, Klinsmann Coleiro, Jonathan Spiteri	Advanced
6	Richard Edwards	"Look at Me Now"	Jan Van Dijck, Richard Edwards	Advanced
7	Annalise Ellul	"Whoop It Up!"	Elton Zarb, Deo Grech	—N/a
8	Kurt Calleja	"This Is the Night"	Johan Jämtberg, Kurt Calleja, Mikael Gunnerås	Advanced
9	Romina Mamo	"DNA"	Michael Johannes Tanczos, Gerard James Borg	—N/a
10	Nadine Bartolo	"Can't Get Away"	Philip Vella	—N/a
11	Lawrence Gray	"In Your Eyes"	Philip Vella, Cher Vella	Advanced
12	Kaya	"First Time"	Gorgi	Advanced
13	Claudia Faniello	"Pure"	Philip Vella, Gerard James Borg	Advanced
14	Jessica Muscat	"Dance Romance"	Philip Vella, Jessica Muscat	—N/a
15	Wayne Micallef	"Time"	Wayne Micallef	Advanced
16	Dorothy Bezzina	"Autobiography"	Magnus Kaxe, Gerard James Borg	Advanced
17	Gianni	"Petals on a Rose"	Robin Abrahamsson, Marcel Numhauser, Trevor Fenech, Amir Aly	Advanced
18	Fabrizio Faniello	"I Will Fight for You (Papa's Song)"	Johan Bejerholm, Niklas Edberger, Robert Uhlmann, Warren Fenech, Fabrizio Faniello	Advanced
19	Janice Mangion	"While Her Eyes Still Glow"	Elton Zarb, Rita Pace	—N/a
20	Eleanor Cassar	"I Want to Run Away"	Paul Giordimaina, Fleur Balzan	—N/a
21	Corazon Mizzi	"Mystifying Eyes"	Paul Giordimaina, Fleur Balzan	Advanced
22	Deborah C feat. Leila James	"You Make Me Go UH UH"	Patrick Renier, David Vervoort	Advanced
23	Anna Azzopardi	"Still Waiting"	Samuel Bugía Garrido, Athanasios Nakos	—N/a
24	Amber	"Answer with Your Eyes"	Ray Agius, Alfred C. Sant	Advanced

==== Final ====
The final took place on 4 February 2012. The sixteen entries that qualified from the semi-final were performed again and the votes of a six-member jury panel (3/4) and the results of public televoting (1/4) determined the winner. The show was opened with a guest performance by the DREAMS musical drama group, while the interval act featured performances by Glen Vella performing "Lie" and "Heal the World" with the gospel choir Animae, 2012 French Eurovision entrant Anggun performing "Only Love" and "Echo (You And I)" and Azerbaijan's Eurovision Song Contest 2011 winners Ell and Nikki performing "Running Scared". After the votes from the jury panel and televote were combined, "This Is the Night" performed by Kurt Calleja was the winner.

Final – 4 February 2012
R/O	Artist	Song	Jury	Televote	Total	Place
1	Lawrence Gray	"In Your Eyes"	23	6	29	7
2	Deborah C feat. Leila James	"You Make Me Go UH UH"	7	0	7	15
3	Dorothy Bezzina	"Autobiography"	25	2	27	8
4	Gianni	"Petals on a Rose"	22	20	42	4
5	Claudia Faniello	"Pure"	64	14	78	2
6	Danica Muscat	"7 Days"	26	0	26	9
7	Fabrizio Faniello	"I Will Fight for You (Papa's Song)"	19	12	31	6
8	Corazon Mizzi	"Mystifying Eyes"	6	10	16	10
9	Richard Edwards	"Look at Me Now"	16	16	32	5
10	Kaya	"First Time"	1	8	9	13
11	Amber	"Answer with Your Eyes"	55	0	55	3
12	Wayne Micallef	"Time"	10	0	10	12
13	Kurt Calleja	"This Is the Night"	60	24	84	1
14	J. Anvil	"You Are My Life"	8	0	8	14
15	Klinsmann	"No Way Back"	0	0	0	16
16	Francesca Borg	"Take Me Far"	6	4	10	11

Detailed Jury Votes
R/O	Song	İ. Güngör	F. Vella	J. Vignoles	B. Berberes	N. Caligiore	K. Demicoli	Total
1	"In Your Eyes"	4	5	5	5	2	2	23
2	"You Make Me Go UH UH"	3		3		1		7
3	"Autobiography"	7	1	1	3	7	6	25
4	"Petals on a Rose"	1	3	2	6	5	5	22
5	"Pure"	8	12	12	12	10	10	64
6	"7 Days"		4	8	7	6	1	26
7	"I Will Fight for You (Papa's Song)"	5	2	4	4		4	19
8	"Mystifying Eyes"			6				6
9	"Look at Me Now"		7	0	2		7	16
10	"First Time"				1			1
11	"Answer with Your Eyes"	12	10	7	10	8	8	55
12	"Time"		6			4		10
13	"This Is the Night"	10	8	10	8	12	12	60
14	"You Are My Life"	2				3	3	8
15	"No Way Back"							0
16	"Take Me Far"	6						6

=== Promotion ===
Kurt Calleja made several appearances across Europe to specifically promote "This Is the Night" as the Maltese Eurovision entry. On 12 February, Calleja performed during the final of the Azerbaijani Eurovision national final. On 29 February, he performed during the final of the Bulgarian Eurovision national final. On 21 April, Kurt Calleja performed during the Eurovision in Concert event which was held at the Melkweg venue in Amsterdam, Netherlands and hosted by Ruth Jacott and Cornald Maas.

== At Eurovision ==
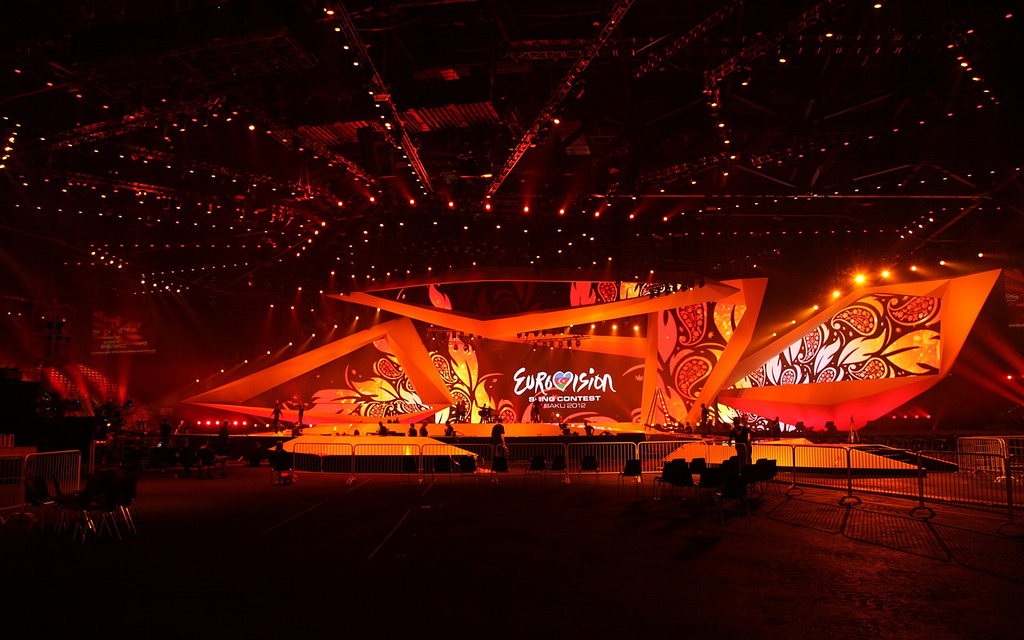
The Eurovision Song Contest 2012 took place at the Baku Crystal Hall in Baku, Azerbaijan

The Eurovision Song Contest 2012 took place at the Baku Crystal Hall in Baku, Azerbaijan and consisted of two semi-finals on 22 and 24 May, and the final of 26 May 2012. According to Eurovision rules, all nations with the exceptions of the host country and the "Big Five" (France, Germany, Italy, Spain and the United Kingdom) are required to qualify from one of two semi-finals in order to compete for the final; the top ten countries from each semi-final progress to the final. The European Broadcasting Union (EBU) split up the competing countries into six different pots based on voting patterns from previous contests, with countries with favourable voting histories put into the same pot. On 25 January 2012, an allocation draw was held which placed each country into one of the two semi-finals. Malta was placed into the second semi-final, to be held on 24 May 2012, and was scheduled to perform in the first half of the show. The running order for the semi-finals was decided through another draw on 20 March 2012 and Malta was set to perform in position 4, following the entry from the Netherlands and before the entry from Belarus.

The two semi-finals and the final were broadcast in Malta on TVM with commentary by Elaine Saliba and Ronald Briffa. The Maltese spokesperson, who announced the Maltese votes during the final, was Keith Demicoli.

=== Semi-final ===
Kurt Calleja took part in technical rehearsals on 15 and 18 May, followed by dress rehearsals on 23 and 24 May. This included the jury show on 23 May where the professional juries of each country watched and voted on the competing entries.

The Maltese performance featured Kurt Calleja wearing a yellow t-shirt under a black jacket along with a single yellow fingerless soft leather glove on his right hand and performing a choreographed routine together with two electric guitarists, a drummer and a DJ/dancer, all of which also provided backing vocals. The background LED screens projected silhouettes of crowds of people waving their arms and dancing against a bright background with flashing light. The backing performers that joined Kurt Calleja on stage were Christian Calleja, Kevin Paul Calleja, Rebecca Spiteri and Warren Bonello. An additional backing vocalist, Amber Bondin, was also part of the performance.

At the end of the show, Malta was announced as having finished in the top 10 and consequently qualifying for the grand final. It was later revealed that Malta placed seventh in the semi-final, receiving a total of 70 points.

=== Final ===
Shortly after the second semi-final, a winners' press conference was held for the ten qualifying countries. As part of this press conference, the qualifying artists took part in a draw to determine the running order for the final. This draw was done in the order the countries appeared in the semi-final running order. Malta was drawn to perform in position 21, following the entry from Germany and before the entry from Macedonia.

Kurt Calleja once again took part in dress rehearsals on 25 and 26 May before the final, including the jury final where the professional juries cast their final votes before the live show. Kurt Calleja performed a repeat of his semi-final performance during the final on 26 May. Malta placed twenty-first in the final, scoring 41 points.

=== Voting ===
Voting during the three shows involved each country awarding points from 1-8, 10 and 12 as determined by a combination of 50% national jury and 50% televoting. Each nation's jury consisted of five music industry professionals who are citizens of the country they represent. This jury judged each entry based on: vocal capacity; the stage performance; the song's composition and originality; and the overall impression by the act. In addition, no member of a national jury was permitted to be related in any way to any of the competing acts in such a way that they cannot vote impartially and independently.

Following the release of the full split voting by the EBU after the conclusion of the competition, it was revealed that Malta had placed twenty-fifth with the public televote and sixteenth with the jury vote in the final. In the public vote, Malta scored 10 points, while with the jury vote, Malta scored 70 points. In the second semi-final, Malta placed eleventh with the public televote with 39 points and fifth with the jury vote, scoring 97 points.

Below is a breakdown of points awarded to Malta and awarded by Malta in the second semi-final and grand final of the contest. The nation awarded its 12 points to Turkey in the semi-final and to Azerbaijan in the final of the contest.

==== Points awarded to Malta ====
Points awarded to Malta (Semi-final 2)
Score	Country
12 points	United Kingdom
10 points	
8 points	
7 points	
6 points	Bulgaria; Lithuania; Turkey; Ukraine
5 points	Belarus; Croatia
4 points	Georgia; Slovenia; Sweden
3 points	Estonia; Serbia
2 points	Macedonia; Netherlands; Slovakia
1 point	

Points awarded to Malta (Final)
Score	Country
12 points	
10 points	
8 points	Azerbaijan
7 points	Lithuania; Ukraine
6 points	Serbia
5 points	United Kingdom
4 points	
3 points	Belarus
2 points	San Marino; Turkey
1 point	Macedonia

==== Points awarded by Malta ====
Points awarded by Malta (Semi-final 2)
Score	Country
12 points	Turkey
10 points	Lithuania
8 points	Sweden
7 points	Slovakia
6 points	Ukraine
5 points	Serbia
4 points	Belarus
3 points	Norway
2 points	Bulgaria
1 point	Macedonia

Points awarded by Malta (Final)
Score	Country
12 points	Azerbaijan
10 points	Italy
8 points	Turkey
7 points	Ukraine
6 points	Sweden
5 points	Serbia
4 points	Lithuania
3 points	Russia
2 points	Germany
1 point	Albania
