= Estonia in the Eurovision Song Contest 2012 =

- Eurovision Song Contest 2012
- Participating broadcaster: Eesti Rahvusringhääling (ERR)
- Country: Estonia
- Selection process: Eesti Laul 2012
- Selection date: 3 March 2012

Competing entry
- Song: "Kuula"
- Artist: Ott Lepland
- Songwriters: Ott Lepland; Aapo Ilves

Placement
- Semi-final result: Qualified (4th, 100 points)
- Final result: 6th, 120 points

Participation chronology

Estonia was represented at the Eurovision Song Contest 2012 with the song "Kuula" written by Ott Lepland and Aapo Ilves. The song was performed by Ott Lepland. The Estonian broadcaster, Eesti Rahvusringhääling (ERR), organized the national final Eesti Laul 2012 in order to select the Estonian entry for the 2012 contest in Baku, Azerbaijan. The national final consisted of three shows: two semi-finals and a final. Ten songs competed in each semi-final and the top five from each semi-final as determined by a jury panel and public vote qualified to the final. In the final, the winner was selected over two rounds of voting. In the first round, a jury panel and a public vote selected the top two to qualify to the superfinal. In the superfinal, "Kuula" performed by Ott Lepland was selected as the winner entirely by a public vote.

Estonia was drawn to compete in the second semi-final of the Eurovision Song Contest which took place on 24 May 2012. Performing during the show in position 14, "Kuula" was announced among the top 10 entries for the second semi-final and therefore qualified to compete in the final on 26 May. It was later revealed that Estonia placed fourth out of the 18 participating countries in the semi-final with 100 points. In the final, Estonia performed in position 11 and placed sixth out of the 26 participating countries, scoring 120 points.

== Background ==
Prior to the 2012 contest, Estonia had participated in the Eurovision Song Contest seventeen times since its first entry in 1994, winning the contest on one occasion in 2001 with the song "Everybody" performed by Tanel Padar, Dave Benton and 2XL. Following the introduction of semi-finals for the 2004, Estonia has, to this point, managed to qualify to the final on two occasions. In 2011, "Rockefeller Street" performed by Getter Jaani managed to qualify Estonia to the final where the song placed twenty-fourth.

The Estonian national broadcaster, Eesti Rahvusringhääling (ERR), broadcasts the event within Estonia and organizes the selection process for the nation's entry. ERR confirmed Estonia's participation at the 2012 Eurovision Song Contest on 2 July 2011. Since their debut, the Estonian broadcaster has organized national finals that feature a competition among multiple artists and songs in order to select Estonia's entry for the Eurovision Song Contest. The Eesti Laul competition has been organized since 2009 in order to select Estonia's entry and on 26 September 2011, ERR announced the organization of Eesti Laul 2012 in order to select the nation's 2012 entry.

== Before Eurovision ==
=== Eesti Laul 2012 ===
Logo of Eesti Laul 2012

Eesti Laul 2012 was the fourth edition of the Estonian national selection Eesti Laul, which selected Estonia's entry for the Eurovision Song Contest 2012. The competition consisted of twenty entries competing in two semi-finals on 18 and 25 February 2012 leading to a ten-song final on 3 March 2012. All three shows were broadcast on Eesti Televisioon (ETV) as well as streamed online at the broadcaster's official website err.ee. The final was also broadcast via radio on Raadio 2 with commentary by Sten Teppan, Erik Morna and Maris Üksti as well as streamed online at the official Eurovision Song Contest website eurovision.tv.

==== Format ====
The format of the competition included two semi-finals on 18 and 25 February 2012 and a final on 3 March 2012. Ten songs competed in each semi-final and the top five from each semi-final qualified to complete the ten song lineup in the final. The results of the semi-finals was determined by the 50/50 combination of votes from a professional jury and public televoting. The winning song in the final was selected over two rounds of voting: the first round results selected the top three songs via the 50/50 combination of jury and public voting, while the second round (superfinal) determined the winner solely by public televoting.

==== Competing entries ====
On 26 September 2011, ERR opened the submission period for artists and composers to submit their entries up until 12 December 2011. All artists and composers were required to have Estonian citizenship or be a permanent resident of Estonia. A record 150 submissions were received by the deadline—breaking the previous record of 155, set during the 2010 edition. An 11-member jury panel selected 20 semi-finalists from the submissions and the selected songs were announced during the ETV entertainment program Ringvaade on 15 December 2011. The selection jury consisted of Owe Petersell (Raadio Elmar chief editor), Toomas Puna (Raadio Sky+ program director), Erik Morna (Raadio 2 head of music), Iiris (musician), Hannaliisa Uusma (musician), Valner Valme (music critic), Siim Nestor (music critic), Henry Kõrvits (musician), Olavi Paide (producer), Koit Raudsepp (Raadio 2 presenter) and Ingrid Kohtla (Tallinn Music Week organiser).

Among the competing artists were previous Eurovision Song Contest entrants Soul Militia, who represented Estonia as 2XL in 2001 together with Tanel Padar and Dave Benton, Lenna Kuurmaa, who represented Switzerland in 2005, as member of the band Vanilla Ninja, and Malcolm Lincoln, who represented Estonia in 2010. Janne Saar, Mimicry, Orelipoiss, Rolf Roosalu (member of POP Maniacs), Sergei Morgun (member of POP Maniacs), Soul Militia, Traffic and Violina have all competed in previous editions of Eesti Laul.

| Artist | Song | Songwriter(s) |
|---|---|---|
| August Hunt | "Tantsulõvi" | August Hunt |
| Birgit Õigemeel and Violina | "You're Not Alone" | Mihkel Mattisen |
| Cat Eye | "Ride" | Karel Kattai, Tanel Roovik, Margaret Kelomees |
| Erasmus Rotterdamist | "Kuu pääle" | Paul Daniel, Jürgen Rooste |
| Janne Saar | "Fight for Love" | Rob Montes, Carola Madis, Janne Saar |
| Lenna | "Mina jään" | Mihkel Raud, Lenna Kuurmaa |
| Liis Lemsalu | "Made Up My Mind" | Liis Lemsalu, Rene Puura |
| Loss Paranoias | "Valedetektor" | Loss Paranoias |
| Malcolm Lincoln | "Bye" | Robin Juhkental |
| Mia feat. I.M.T.B | "Bon voyage" | Vahur Valgmaa |
| Milky Whip | "My Love" | Karl Kanter, Helina Reinjärv |
| Mimicry | "The Destination" | Paul Lepasson |
| Orelipoiss | "Zombi" | Jaan Pehk, Olavi Ruitlane |
| Ott Lepland | "Kuula" | Ott Lepland, Aapo Ilves |
| POP Maniacs | "I Don't Know" | Rolf Roosalu |
| Soul Militia | "The Future is Now" | Lauri Pihlap |
| Soundclear | "A Little Soldier" | Karl-Ander Reismann |
| Teele Viira | "City Nights" | Priit Uustulnd, Teele Viira |
| Tenfold Rabbit | "Oblivion" | Tenfold Rabbit |
| Traffic | "NASA" | Ago Teppand, Jaan Pehk |

==== Semi-finals ====
The two semi-finals took place on 18 and 25 February 2012, hosted by Piret Järvis. The live portion of the shows was held at the ERR studios in Tallinn where the artists awaited the results while their performances, which were filmed earlier at the ERR studios, were screened. In each semi-final ten songs competed for five spots in the final with the outcome decided upon by the combination of the votes from a jury panel and a public televote which registered 17,858 votes in the first semi-final and 14,839 votes in the second semi-final. The jury panel that voted in the semi-finals consisted of Eda-Ines Etti, Owe Petersell, Erik Morna, Tõnis Kahu, Els Himma, Mart Niineste, Jalmar Vabarna, Sven Grünberg, Olav Osolin, Veronika Portsmuth and Valner Valme.

Semi-final 1 – 18 February 2012
| R/O | Artist | Song | Jury | Televote | | Total | Place |
| R/O | Artist | Song | Jury | Votes | Points | Total | Place |
|---|---|---|---|---|---|---|---|
| 1 | Janne Saar | "Fight for Love" | 3 | 521 | 3 | 6 | 9 |
| 2 | Erasmus Rotterdamist | "Kuu pääle" | 6 | 473 | 2 | 8 | 7 |
| 3 | Mia feat. I.M.T.B | "Bon Voyage" | 2 | 725 | 4 | 6 | 8 |
| 4 | Milky Whip | "My Love" | 1 | 410 | 1 | 2 | 10 |
| 5 | POP Maniacs | "I Don't Know" | 8 | 1,914 | 7 | 15 | 3 |
| 6 | Ott Lepland | "Kuula" | 9 | 6,276 | 10 | 19 | 1 |
| 7 | August Hunt | "Tantsulõvi" | 7 | 1,708 | 6 | 13 | 5 |
| 8 | Soundclear | "A Little Soldier" | 4 | 1,053 | 5 | 9 | 6 |
| 9 | Liis Lemsalu | "Made Up My Mind" | 10 | 2,607 | 9 | 19 | 2 |
| 10 | Loss Paranoias | "Valedetektor" | 5 | 2,171 | 8 | 13 | 4 |

Semi-final 2 – 25 February 2012
| R/O | Artist | Song | Jury | Televote | | Total | Place |
| R/O | Artist | Song | Jury | Votes | Points | Total | Place |
|---|---|---|---|---|---|---|---|
| 1 | Traffic | "NASA" | 7 | 1,165 | 5 | 12 | 5 |
| 2 | Lenna | "Mina jään" | 10 | 2,967 | 10 | 20 | 1 |
| 3 | Malcolm Lincoln | "Bye" | 8 | 430 | 1 | 9 | 7 |
| 4 | Tenfold Rabbit | "Oblivion" | 9 | 1,702 | 7 | 16 | 2 |
| 5 | Birgit Õigemeel and Violina | "You're Not Alone" | 3 | 2,283 | 9 | 12 | 3 |
| 6 | Soul Militia | "The Future is Now" | 2 | 1,436 | 6 | 8 | 8 |
| 7 | Mimicry | "The Destination" | 5 | 1,086 | 4 | 9 | 6 |
| 8 | Orelipoiss | "Zombi" | 6 | 612 | 2 | 8 | 9 |
| 9 | Teele Viira | "City Nights" | 4 | 2,141 | 8 | 12 | 4 |
| 10 | Cat Eye | "Ride" | 1 | 1,017 | 3 | 4 | 10 |

==== Final ====
The final took place on 3 March 2012 at the Nokia Concert Hall in Tallinn, hosted by Piret Järvis, Taavi Teplenkov and Tiit Sukk. The five entries that qualified from each of the two preceding semi-finals, all together ten songs, competed during the show. The winner was selected over two rounds of voting. In the first round, a jury (50%) and public televote (50%) determined the top two entries to proceed to the superfinal: "Mina jään" performed by Lenna and "Kuula" performed by Ott Lepland. The public vote in the first round registered 48,995 votes. In the superfinal, "Kuula" performed by Ott Lepland was selected as the winner entirely by a public televote. The public televote in the superfinal registered 46,670 votes. In addition to the performances of the competing entries, Getter Jaani, who represented Estonia in the Eurovision Song Contest 2011, and the bands 3 Pead with Bonzo, Marten Kuningas with HU?, and Kosmikud with Laine performed as the interval acts. The jury panel that voted in the first round of the final consisted of Ivo Linna (singer), Hanna-Liina Võsa (singer), Toomas Puna (Raadio Sky+ program director), Siim Nestor (music critic), Eda-Ines Etti (singer), Ewert Sundja (musician), Heini Vaikmaa (musician), Helen Sildna (Tallinn Music Week organiser), Madis Aesma (musician), Owe Petersell (Raadio Elmar chief editor) and Koit Toome (singer).

Final – 3 March 2012
| R/O | Artist | Song | Jury | | Televote | | Total | Place |
| R/O | Artist | Song | Votes | Points | Votes | Points | Total | Place |
|---|---|---|---|---|---|---|---|---|
| 1 | Loss Paranoias | "Valedetektor" | 55 | 5 | 2,221 | 3 | 8 | 6 |
| 2 | Teele Viira | "City Nights" | 40 | 3 | 1,793 | 2 | 5 | 9 |
| 3 | Liis Lemsalu | "Made Up My Mind" | 76 | 7 | 3,016 | 5 | 12 | 5 |
| 4 | August Hunt | "Tantsulõvi" | 27 | 2 | 2,282 | 4 | 6 | 8 |
| 5 | Lenna | "Mina jään" | 99 | 10 | 7,743 | 9 | 19 | 2 |
| 6 | POP Maniacs | "I Don't Know" | 69 | 6 | 3,664 | 7 | 13 | 4 |
| 7 | Traffic | "NASA" | 52 | 4 | 1,723 | 1 | 5 | 10 |
| 8 | Tenfold Rabbit | "Oblivion" | 78 | 8 | 5,038 | 8 | 16 | 3 |
| 9 | Birgit Õigemeel and Violina | "You're Not Alone" | 27 | 1 | 3,504 | 6 | 7 | 7 |
| 10 | Ott Lepland | "Kuula" | 82 | 9 | 18,011 | 10 | 19 | 1 |

Detailed Jury Votes
| R/O | Song | I. Linna | H. Võsa | T. Puna | S. Nestor | E. Etti | E. Sundja | H. Vaikmaa | H. Sildna | M. Aesma | O. Petersell | K. Toome | Total |
|---|---|---|---|---|---|---|---|---|---|---|---|---|---|
| 1 | "Valedetektor" | 5 | 2 | 8 | 9 | 4 | 3 | 6 | 5 | 9 | 1 | 3 | 55 |
| 2 | "City Nights" | 4 | 3 | 1 | 5 | 1 | 4 | 3 | 7 | 3 | 4 | 5 | 40 |
| 3 | "Made Up My Mind" | 7 | 8 | 4 | 6 | 7 | 8 | 8 | 10 | 7 | 7 | 4 | 76 |
| 4 | "Tantsulõvi" | 3 | 1 | 5 | 1 | 2 | 1 | 1 | 6 | 4 | 2 | 1 | 27 |
| 5 | "Mina jään" | 9 | 10 | 10 | 7 | 8 | 10 | 10 | 8 | 8 | 10 | 9 | 99 |
| 6 | "I Don't Know" | 8 | 9 | 7 | 4 | 6 | 7 | 2 | 4 | 5 | 9 | 8 | 69 |
| 7 | "NASA" | 6 | 5 | 3 | 3 | 5 | 6 | 5 | 1 | 6 | 6 | 6 | 52 |
| 8 | "Oblivion" | 2 | 7 | 9 | 8 | 9 | 5 | 7 | 9 | 10 | 5 | 7 | 78 |
| 9 | "You're Not Alone" | 1 | 4 | 2 | 2 | 3 | 2 | 4 | 3 | 1 | 3 | 2 | 27 |
| 10 | "Kuula" | 10 | 6 | 6 | 10 | 10 | 9 | 9 | 2 | 2 | 8 | 10 | 82 |

Superfinal – 3 March 2012
| R/O | Artist | Song | Televote | Place |
|---|---|---|---|---|
| 1 | Lenna | "Mina jään" | 15,401 | 2 |
| 2 | Ott Lepland | "Kuula" | 31,269 | 1 |

=== Promotion ===
Ahead of the contest, Lepland recorded "Kuula" in several other languages: in Spanish as "Escucha", in English as "Hear Me" and in Russian as "Slushay".

== At Eurovision ==
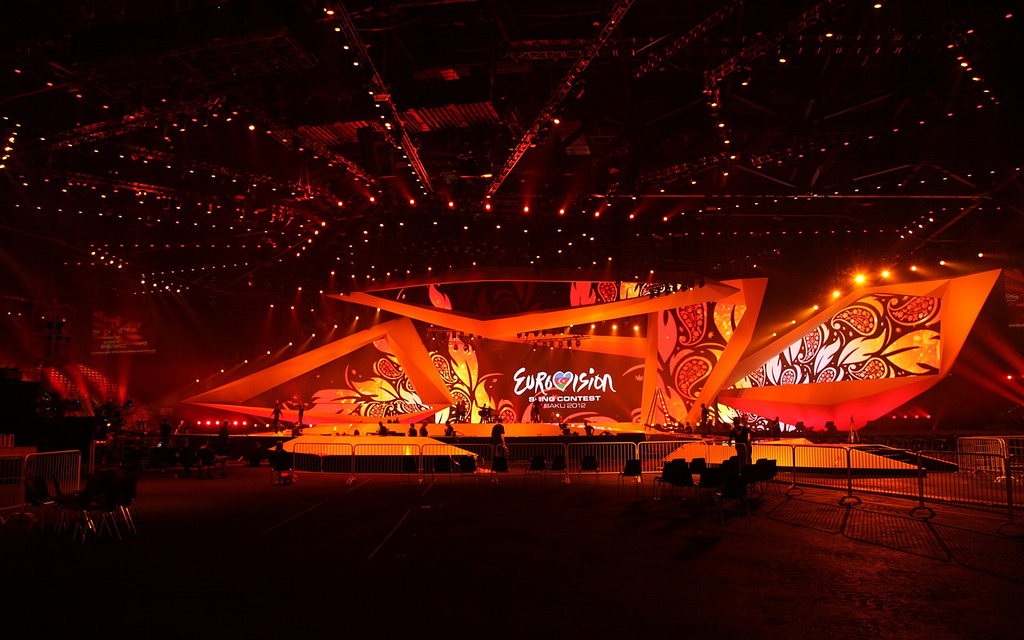
The Eurovision Song Contest 2012 took place at the Baku Crystal Hall in Baku, Azerbaijan

According to Eurovision rules, all nations with the exceptions of the host country and the "Big Five" (France, Germany, Italy, Spain and the United Kingdom) are required to qualify from one of two semi-finals in order to compete for the final; the top ten countries from each semi-final progress to the final. The European Broadcasting Union (EBU) split up the competing countries into six different pots based on voting patterns from previous contests, with countries with favourable voting histories put into the same pot. On 25 January 2012, an allocation draw was held which placed each country into one of the two semi-finals. Estonia was placed into the second semi-final, to be held on 24 May 2012. The running order for the semi-finals was decided through another draw on 20 March 2012 and Estonia was set to perform in position 14, following the entry from Turkey and before the entry from Slovakia.

The two semi-finals and the final were broadcast in Estonia on ETV with commentary by Marko Reikop. The first semi-final and final were also broadcast via radio on Raadio 2 with commentary by Mart Juur and Andrus Kivirähk. The Estonian spokesperson, who announced the Estonian votes during the final, was Getter Jaani who had previously represented Estonia in the Eurovision Song Contest in 2011.

=== Semi-final ===
Ott Lepland took part in technical rehearsals on 16 and 20 May, followed by dress rehearsals on 23 and 24 May. This included the jury show on 9 May where the professional juries of each country watched and voted on the competing entries.

The Estonian performance featured Ott Lepland performing on stage in a grey waistcoat and white t-shirt and joined by backing vocalist Marvi Vallaste, who was replaced by Lepland's vocal coach Maiken during the second technical rehearsal due to illness. The stage was dark with a single spotlight on Lepland at the beginning of the performance. Beams of lights were then displayed across the stage in gold colours and images of floating leaves appeared on the LED screens at the final part of the song.

At the end of the show, Estonia was announced as having finished in the top 10 and subsequently qualifying for the grand final. It was later revealed that Estonia placed 4th in the semi-final, receiving a total of 100 points.

=== Final ===
Shortly after the second semi-final, a winners' press conference was held for the ten qualifying countries. As part of this press conference, the qualifying artists took part in a draw to determine the running order for the final. This draw was done in the order the countries appeared in the semi-final running order. Estonia was drawn to perform in position 11, following the entry from Italy and before the entry from Norway.

Ott Lepland once again took part in dress rehearsals on 25 and 26 May before the final, including the jury final where the professional juries cast their final votes before the live show. Ott Lepland performed a repeat of his semi-final performance during the final on 26 May. At the conclusion of the voting, Estonia finished in sixth place with 120 points.

=== Voting ===
Voting during the three shows consisted of 50 percent public televoting and 50 percent from a jury deliberation. The jury consisted of five music industry professionals who were citizens of the country they represent. This jury was asked to judge each contestant based on: vocal capacity; the stage performance; the song's composition and originality; and the overall impression by the act. In addition, no member of a national jury could be related in any way to any of the competing acts in such a way that they cannot vote impartially and independently.

Following the release of the full split voting by the EBU after the conclusion of the competition, it was revealed that Estonia had placed fifth with the public televote and fourth with the jury vote in the second semi-final. In the public vote, Estonia scored 144 points, while with the jury vote, Estonia scored 102 points. In the final, Estonia placed twelfth with the public televote with 78 points and sixth with the jury vote, scoring 152 points.

Below is a breakdown of points awarded to Estonia and awarded by Estonia in the second semi-final and grand final of the contest, and the breakdown of the jury voting and televoting conducted during the two shows:

==== Points awarded to Estonia ====
Points awarded to Estonia (Semi-final 2)
| Score | Country |
|---|---|
| 12 points | Portugal; Sweden |
| 10 points | France; Slovakia |
| 8 points | Lithuania; Netherlands; Norway |
| 7 points | Georgia; Germany; United Kingdom |
| 6 points | |
| 5 points | |
| 4 points | Belarus |
| 3 points | Bulgaria; Ukraine |
| 2 points | |
| 1 point | Slovenia |

Points awarded to Estonia (Final)
| Score | Country |
|---|---|
| 12 points | |
| 10 points | Finland; France; Iceland; Slovakia |
| 8 points | Ireland; Latvia; Lithuania; Sweden |
| 7 points | Netherlands; Norway; Portugal |
| 6 points | Russia; Spain |
| 5 points | |
| 4 points | Belarus; Germany; United Kingdom |
| 3 points | |
| 2 points | Moldova |
| 1 point | Ukraine |

==== Points awarded by Estonia ====
Points awarded by Estonia (Semi-final 2)
| Score | Country |
|---|---|
| 12 points | Sweden |
| 10 points | Lithuania |
| 8 points | Norway |
| 7 points | Netherlands |
| 6 points | Slovakia |
| 5 points | Ukraine |
| 4 points | Georgia |
| 3 points | Malta |
| 2 points | Turkey |
| 1 point | Serbia |

Points awarded by Estonia (Final)
| Score | Country |
|---|---|
| 12 points | Sweden |
| 10 points | Germany |
| 8 points | Russia |
| 7 points | Italy |
| 6 points | Iceland |
| 5 points | United Kingdom |
| 4 points | Spain |
| 3 points | Lithuania |
| 2 points | Denmark |
| 1 point | Ukraine |
