= Norway in the Eurovision Song Contest 2012 =

- Eurovision Song Contest 2012
- Participating broadcaster: Norsk rikskringkasting (NRK)
- Country: Norway
- Selection process: Melodi Grand Prix 2012
- Selection date: 11 February 2012

Competing entry
- Song: "Stay"
- Artist: Tooji
- Songwriters: Tooji; Peter Boström; Figge Boström

Placement
- Semi-final result: Qualified (10th, 45 points)
- Final result: 26th, 7 points

Participation chronology

Norway was represented at the Eurovision Song Contest 2012 with the song "Stay" written by Tooji, Peter Boström and Figge Boström. The song was performed by Tooji. The Norwegian Broadcasting Corporation (NRK) organised the national final Melodi Grand Prix 2012 in order to select the Norwegian entry for the 2012 contest in Baku, Azerbaijan. 24 entries competed in the national final that consisted of three semi-finals and a final. Ten entries ultimately qualified to compete in the final on 11 February 2012 where the winner was determined over two rounds of voting. In the first round of voting, a public televote exclusively selected the top four entries to advance to the competition's second round—the Gold Final. In the second round of voting, "Stay" performed by Tooji was selected as the winner following the combination of votes from three regional jury groups and a public vote.

Norway was drawn to compete in the second semi-final of the Eurovision Song Contest which took place on 24 May 2012. Performing during the show in position 16, "Stay" was announced among the top 10 entries of the second semi-final and therefore qualified to compete in the final on 26 May. It was later revealed that Norway placed tenth out of the 18 participating countries in the semi-final with 45 points. In the final, Norway performed in position 12 and placed twenty-sixth (last) out of the 26 participating countries with 7 points.

== Background ==
Prior to the 2012 contest, Norway had participated in the Eurovision Song Contest 50 times since its first entry in 1960. Norway had won the contest on two occasions: in 1985 with the song "La det swinge" performed by Bobbysocks! and in 1995 with the song "Nocturne" performed by Secret Garden. Norway also had the two dubious distinctions of having finished last in the Eurovision final more than any other country and for having the most "nul points" (zero points) in the contest, the latter being a record the nation shared together with Austria. The country had finished last eleven times and had failed to score a point during four contests. Following the introduction of semi-finals in 2004, Norway has, to this point, finished in the top 10 three times: Wig Wam finished ninth with the song "In My Dreams" in 2005, Maria Haukaas Storeng was fifth in 2008 with "Hold On Be Strong", and Alexander Rybak won in 2009.

The Norwegian national broadcaster, Norsk rikskringkasting (NRK), broadcasts the event within Norway and organises the selection process for the nation's entry. NRK confirmed their intentions to participate at the 2012 Eurovision Song Contest on 30 June 2011. The broadcaster has traditionally organised the national final Melodi Grand Prix, which has selected the Norwegian entry for the Eurovision Song Contest in all but one of their participation. Along with their participation confirmation, the broadcaster revealed details regarding their selection procedure and announced the organization of Melodi Grand Prix 2012 in order to select the 2012 Norwegian entry.

== Before Eurovision ==
=== Melodi Grand Prix 2012 ===
Melodi Grand Prix 2012 was the 50th edition of the Norwegian national final Melodi Grand Prix and selected Norway's entry for the Eurovision Song Contest 2012. 24 songs were selected to compete in a four-week-long process that commenced on 21 January 2012 and concluded with the final on 11 February 2012. All shows were hosted by Per Sundnes and Marte Stokstad and televised on NRK1 as well as streamed online at NRK's official website nrk.no. The final was also broadcast online at the official Eurovision Song Contest website eurovision.tv.

==== Format ====
The competition consisted of four shows: three semi-finals on 21 January 2012, 28 January 2012 and 4 February 2012 and a final on 11 February 2012. Eight songs competed in each semi-final and the top three entries qualified to the final. The results of the semi-finals were determined exclusively by public televoting, while a jury also awarded one of the eliminated acts a wildcard to proceed to the final. The results in the final were determined by jury voting and public televoting. Viewers could cast their votes through telephone and SMS voting.

==== Competing entries ====
A submission period was opened by NRK between 30 June 2011 and 2 September 2011. Songwriters of any nationality were allowed to submit entries, while performers of the selected songs would be chosen by NRK in consultation with the songwriters. In addition to the public call for submissions, NRK reserved the right to directly invite certain artists and composers to compete. At the close of the deadline, over 800 submissions were received. 24 songs were selected for the competition by an eight-member jury panel consisting of representatives of NRK, record labels and production companies. The competing acts were revealed between 27 October 2011 and 16 December 2011, while their songs were revealed on 20 December 2011. Among the artists was past Norwegian Eurovision entrant Benedicte Adrian (member of the group United) who represented the country in 1984 as part of the duo Dollie de Luxe, and Malin Reitan who represented Norway at the Junior Eurovision Song Contest 2005.

| Artist | Song | Songwriter(s) |
|---|---|---|
| The Canoes | "It Seemed Like a Good Idea at the Time" | Arne Hovda, Erik Norvald Røe, Christopher Barron Gross, Hans Petter Aaserud |
| The Carburetors | "Don't Touch the Flame" | Stian Krogh, Christopher Lindahl, Per Gunnar Lund-Vang |
| Cocktail Slippers | "Keeps On Dancing" | Cocktail Slippers |
| Håvard Lothe Band | "The Greatest Day" | Håvard Lothe |
| Irresistible feat. Carl Pritt | "Elevator" | Anne Wik, Nermin Harambašić, Ronny Svendsen, Robin Jenssen, Carl Pritt |
| Isabel Ødegård | "I've Got You" | Thomas Helland, Isabel Ødegård |
| Kim André Rysstad | "Så vidunderleg" | Elin Nygård |
| Lisa Stokke | "With Love" | Lisa Stokke, Johanna Demker, Anita Lixel, Tommy Berre |
| Lise Karlsnes | "Sailors" | Lise Karlsnes, Thomas Eriksen |
| Malin Reitan | "Crush" | Beyond51 |
| Marthe Valle | "Si" | Marthe Valle |
| Minnie-Oh | "You and I" | Monica Johansen |
| Nora Foss al-Jabri | "Somewhere Beautiful" | Christian Ingebrigtsen, Eivind Rølles |
| Petter Øien and Bobby Bare | "Things Change" | Bobby Bare |
| Plumbo | "Ola Nordmann" | Lars Erik Blokkhus, Glenn Hauger |
| Reidun Sæther | "High on Love" | Thomas G:son, Tommy Berre, Ovidiu Jacobsen |
| Rikke Lie | "Another Heartache" | Rikke Lie, Maria Marcus, Niclas Lundin |
| Rikke Normann | "Shapeshifter" | Silya Nymoen, Rikke Normann |
| Rudi Myntevik | "You Break It, You Own It" | Rune Berg, Asbjørn Ribe |
| Silya | "Euphoria" | Silya Nymoen |
| Tommy Fredvang | "Make It Better" | Tommy Fredvang, Hanne Sørvaag, Tommy Berre |
| Tooji | "Stay" | Tooji, Peter Boström, Figge Boström |
| United | "Little Bobbi" | John Lundvik, Philip Halloun, Thomas Felberg |
| Yaseen and Julie Maria | "Sammen" | Sigve Bull, El Axel |

==== Semi-finals ====
Eight songs competed in each of the three semi-finals that took place on 21 January, 28 January and 4 February 2012. The first semi-final took place at the Hangar E of the Ørland Hovedflystasjon in Ørland, the second semi-final took place at the Arena Larvik in Larvik, and the third semi-final took place at the Florø Idrettssenter in Florø. The top three advanced to the final from each semi-final, and "Sailors" performed by Lise Karlsnes was announced on 31 January 2011 to have received the jury wildcard to also proceed to the final.

Semi-final 1 – 21 January 2012
| R/O | Artist | Song | Place | Result |
|---|---|---|---|---|
| 1 | Irresistible feat. Carl Pritt | "Elevator" | — | —N/a |
| 2 | Kim André Rysstad | "Så vidunderleg" | — | —N/a |
| 3 | Reidun Sæther | "High on Love" | 3 | Advanced |
| 4 | Rudi Myntevik | "You Break It, You Own It" | — | —N/a |
| 5 | Lisa Stokke | "With Love" | — | —N/a |
| 6 | United | "Little Bobbi" | — | —N/a |
| 7 | Nora Foss al-Jabri | "Somewhere Beautiful" | 1 | Advanced |
| 8 | The Carburetors | "Don't Touch the Flame" | 2 | Advanced |

Semi-final 2 – 28 January 2012
| R/O | Artist | Song | Place | Result |
|---|---|---|---|---|
| 1 | Cocktail Slippers | "Keeps On Dancing" | — | —N/a |
| 2 | Isabel Ødegård | "I've Got You" | — | —N/a |
| 3 | Tommy Fredvang | "Make It Better" | 2 | Advanced |
| 4 | Rikke Lie | "Another Heartache" | — | —N/a |
| 5 | Malin Reitan | "Crush" | 3 | Advanced |
| 6 | Plumbo | "Ola Nordmann" | 1 | Advanced |
| 7 | Minnie-Oh | "You and I" | — | —N/a |
| 8 | Rikke Normann | "Shapeshifter" | — | —N/a |

Semi-final 3 – 4 February 2012
| R/O | Artist | Song | Place | Result |
|---|---|---|---|---|
| 1 | Tooji | "Stay" | 2 | Advanced |
| 2 | Marthe Valle | "Si" | — | —N/a |
| 3 | Petter Øien and Bobby Bare | "Things Change" | 1 | Advanced |
| 4 | Yaseen and Julie Maria | "Sammen" | 3 | Advanced |
| 5 | Håvard Lothe Band | "The Greatest Day" | — | —N/a |
| 6 | Silya | "Euphoria" | — | —N/a |
| 7 | The Canoes | "It Seemed Like a Good Idea at the Time" | — | —N/a |
| 8 | Lise Karlsnes | "Sailors" | — | Wildcard |

==== Final ====
Ten songs that qualified from the preceding three semi-finals competed during the final at the Oslo Spektrum in Oslo on 11 February 2012. The winner was selected over two rounds of voting. In the first round, the top four entries were selected by public televoting to proceed to the second round, the Gold Final. In the Gold Final, three regional juries from the three semi-final host cities each distributed points as follows: 2,000, 4,000, 6,000 and 8,000 points. The results of the public televote were then revealed by Norway's five regions and added to the jury scores, leading to the victory of "Stay" performed by Tooji with 155,480 votes. In addition to the performances of the competing entries, the interval acts featured the ten artists performing the 1960 Norwegian Eurovision entry "Voi Voi" together, and Norwegian Eurovision 2009 winner Alexander Rybak performing a medley of past Eurovision entries, including his entry "Fairytale".

Final – 11 February 2012
| R/O | Artist | Song | Result |
|---|---|---|---|
| 1 | Tooji | "Stay" | Advanced |
| 2 | Reidun Sæther | "High on Love" | —N/a |
| 3 | Lise Karlsnes | "Sailors" | —N/a |
| 4 | Plumbo | "Ola Nordmann" | Advanced |
| 5 | Malin Reitan | "Crush" | —N/a |
| 6 | Nora Foss al-Jabri | "Somewhere Beautiful" | Advanced |
| 7 | The Carburetors | "Don't Touch the Flame" | —N/a |
| 8 | Petter Øien and Bobby Bare | "Things Change" | Advanced |
| 9 | Yaseen and Julie Maria | "Sammen" | —N/a |
| 10 | Tommy Fredvang | "Make It Better" | —N/a |

Gold Final – 11 February 2012
| R/O | Artist | Song | Jury | Televote | Total | Place |
|---|---|---|---|---|---|---|
| 1 | Plumbo | "Ola Nordmann" | 10,000 | 51,868 | 61,868 | 4 |
| 2 | Nora Foss al-Jabri | "Somewhere Beautiful" | 24,000 | 66,046 | 90,046 | 2 |
| 3 | Petter Øien and Bobby Bare | "Things Change" | 8,000 | 71,685 | 79,685 | 3 |
| 4 | Tooji | "Stay" | 18,000 | 137,480 | 155,480 | 1 |

Detailed regional jury votes
| R/O | Song | Ørland | Larvik | Florø | Total |
|---|---|---|---|---|---|
| 1 | "Ola Nordmann" | 2,000 | 4,000 | 4,000 | 10,000 |
| 2 | "Somewhere Beautiful" | 8,000 | 8,000 | 8,000 | 24,000 |
| 3 | "Things Change" | 4,000 | 2,000 | 2,000 | 8,000 |
| 4 | "Stay" | 6,000 | 6,000 | 6,000 | 18,000 |
Spokespersons
Ørland – Rudi Myntevik; Larvik – Minnie-Oh; Florø – Håvard Lothe Band

Detailed regional televoting results
| R/O | Song | North | West | South | Central | East | Total |
|---|---|---|---|---|---|---|---|
| 1 | "Ola Nordmann" | 1,089 | 7,037 | 12,712 | 11,633 | 19,397 | 51,868 |
| 2 | "Somewhere Beautiful" | 1,381 | 9,776 | 12,615 | 14,581 | 27,693 | 66,046 |
| 3 | "Things Change" | 2,452 | 11,552 | 14,907 | 19,963 | 22,811 | 71,685 |
| 4 | "Stay" | 3,425 | 21,146 | 26,474 | 32,114 | 54,321 | 137,480 |
Spokespersons
Northern Norway – Isabel Ødegård; Western Norway – Rikke Lie; Southern Norway – Cocktail Slippers; Central Norway – Silya Nymoen; Eastern Norway – Rikke Normann

==== Ratings ====
Viewing figures by show
| Show | Date | Viewers (in millions) | Ref. |
|---|---|---|---|
| Semi-final 1 | 21 January 2012 | 1.024 | |
| Semi-final 2 | 28 January 2012 | 0.958 | |
| Semi-final 3 | 4 February 2012 | 0.916 | |
| Final | 11 February 2012 | 1.221 | |

== At Eurovision ==
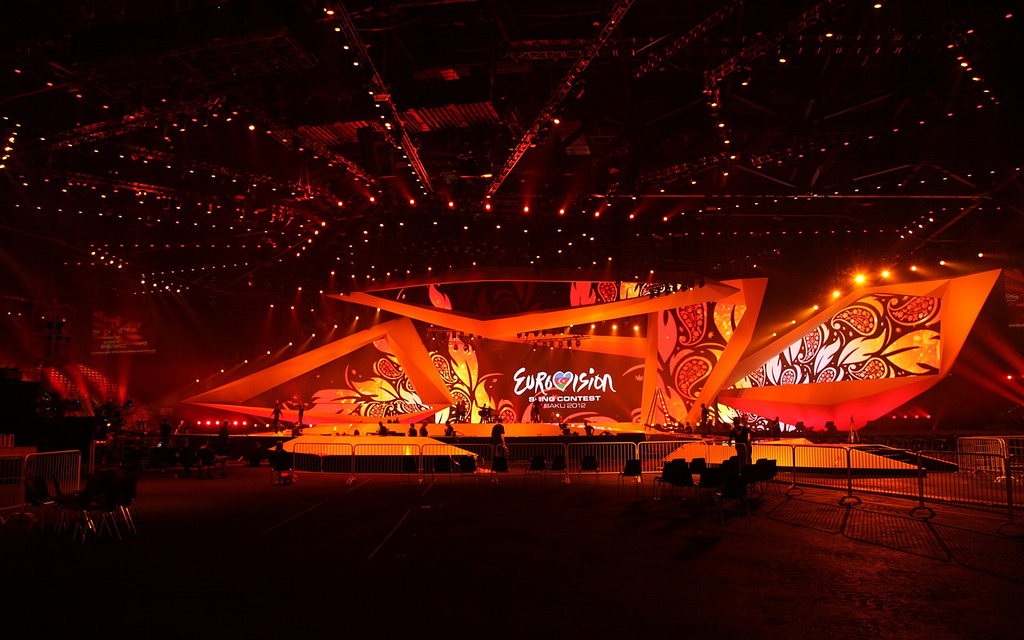
The Eurovision Song Contest 2012 took place at the Baku Crystal Hall in Baku, Azerbaijan

According to Eurovision rules, all nations with the exceptions of the host country and the "Big Five" (France, Germany, Italy, Spain and the United Kingdom) are required to qualify from one of two semi-finals in order to compete for the final; the top ten countries from each semi-final progress to the final. The European Broadcasting Union (EBU) split up the competing countries into six different pots based on voting patterns from previous contests, with countries with favourable voting histories put into the same pot. On 25 January 2012, an allocation draw was held which placed each country into one of the two semi-finals, as well as which half of the show they would perform in. Norway was placed into the second semi-final, to be held on 24 May 2012, and was scheduled to perform in the second half of the show. The running order for the semi-finals was decided through another draw on 20 March 2012 and Norway was set to perform in position 16, following the entry from Slovakia and before the entry from Bosnia and Herzegovina.

In Norway, the two semi-finals and the final were broadcast on NRK1 with commentary by Olav Viksmo-Slettan. The Norwegian spokesperson, who announced the Norwegian votes during the final, was Nadia Hasnaoui who co-hosted the Eurovision Song Contest 2010.

=== Semi-final ===
Tooji took part in technical rehearsals on 16 and 20 May, followed by dress rehearsals on 23 and 24 May. This included the jury final where professional juries of each country watched and voted on the competing entries.

The Norwegian performance featured Tooji performing a choreographed routine on stage in a grey top, leather jacket and dark trousers together with four dancers that also performed backing vocals. The stage colours were predominantly red and orange with white strobe lighting and the performance also featured several effects including smoke as well as red fireworks and flames at the end. The four dancers/backing vocalists on stage with Tooji were: Anne-Marit Tynes, Daniel Gill, Maria Karlsen and Sérgio Benvindo Júnior (BamBam); the Norwegian performance was choreographed by Karlsen together with Mattias Carlsson. An additional backing vocalist, Hans Esben Gihle, was also on stage.

At the end of the show, Norway was announced as having finished in the top 10 and subsequently qualifying for the grand final. It was later revealed that Norway had tied for tenth place in the semi-final with Bulgaria, receiving a total of 45 points, but under tiebreak rules the number of countries that voted for Norway (11) was higher than the number for Bulgaria (10) and therefore Norway qualified to the final over Bulgaria.

=== Final ===
Shortly after the second semi-final, a winners' press conference was held for the ten qualifying countries. As part of this press conference, the qualifying artists took part in a draw to determine the running order for the final. This draw was done in the order the countries appeared in the semi-final running order. Norway was drawn to perform in position 12, following the entry from Estonia and before the entry from Azerbaijan.

Tooji once again took part in dress rehearsals on 25 and 26 May before the final, including the jury final where the professional juries cast their final votes before the live show. Tooji performed a repeat of his semi-final performance during the final on 26 May. Norway placed twenty-sixth (last) in the final, scoring 7 points. This was the eleventh time Norway finished in last place at the contest.

=== Voting ===
Voting during the three shows consisted of 50 percent public televoting and 50 percent from a jury deliberation. The jury consisted of five music industry professionals who were citizens of the country they represent. This jury was asked to judge each contestant based on: vocal capacity; the stage performance; the song's composition and originality; and the overall impression by the act. In addition, no member of a national jury could be related in any way to any of the competing acts in such a way that they cannot vote impartially and independently.

Following the release of the full split voting by the EBU after the conclusion of the competition, it was revealed that Norway had placed twenty-fourth with both the public televote and the jury vote in the final. In the public vote, Norway scored 16 points, while with the jury vote, Norway scored 24 points. In the second semi-final, Norway placed sixth with the public televote with 72 points and eighteenth (last) with the jury vote, scoring 25 points.

Below is a breakdown of points awarded to Norway and awarded by Norway in the second semi-final and grand final of the contest. The nation awarded its 12 points to Sweden in the semi-final and the final of the contest.

==== Points awarded to Norway ====
Points awarded to Norway (Semi-final 2)
| Score | Country |
|---|---|
| 12 points | |
| 10 points | Sweden |
| 8 points | Estonia |
| 7 points | |
| 6 points | |
| 5 points | |
| 4 points | Lithuania; Slovakia; Turkey |
| 3 points | Belarus; Malta; Netherlands; Portugal |
| 2 points | Bulgaria |
| 1 point | Bosnia and Herzegovina |

Points awarded to Norway (Final)
| Score | Country |
|---|---|
| 12 points | |
| 10 points | |
| 8 points | |
| 7 points | |
| 6 points | |
| 5 points | |
| 4 points | |
| 3 points | Netherlands; Sweden |
| 2 points | |
| 1 point | Iceland |

==== Points awarded by Norway ====
Points awarded by Norway (Semi-final 2)
| Score | Country |
|---|---|
| 12 points | Sweden |
| 10 points | Serbia |
| 8 points | Estonia |
| 7 points | Lithuania |
| 6 points | Bulgaria |
| 5 points | Portugal |
| 4 points | Bosnia and Herzegovina |
| 3 points | Netherlands |
| 2 points | Ukraine |
| 1 point | Turkey |

Points awarded by Norway (Final)
| Score | Country |
|---|---|
| 12 points | Sweden |
| 10 points | Serbia |
| 8 points | Russia |
| 7 points | Estonia |
| 6 points | Lithuania |
| 5 points | Iceland |
| 4 points | Italy |
| 3 points | Germany |
| 2 points | Denmark |
| 1 point | Ukraine |
