= The Carburetors =

Norwegian hard rock band

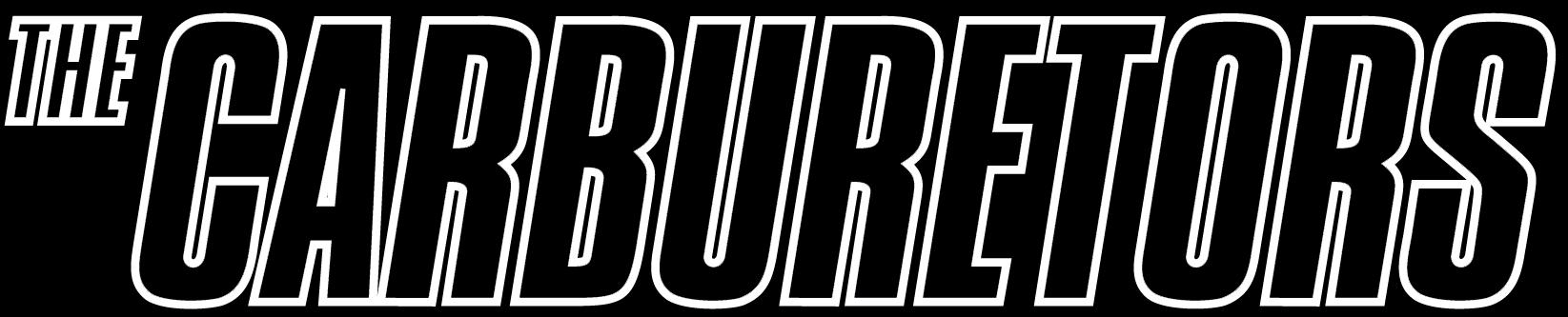

Background information
- Origin: Oslo, Norway
- Genres: Hard rock, rock and roll, heavy metal
- Years active: 2001–present
- Labels: Facefront, Bodog, Ewil Wheel, I Hate People
- Members: Eddie Guz; Chris Marchand; Kai Kidd; Chris Nitro; King O'Men
- Website: thecarburetors.com

The Carburetors is a Norwegian hard rock band from Oslo, formed in 2001. Their music is based on boogie rock and roll and heavy metal and has been described as a mix of Chuck Berry and Motörhead.

== History ==
The band released their first album Pain Is Temporary, Glory Is Forever on FaceFront Records in 2004 after several singles on CD and 7". Two video-tracks were produced from the album, and the one for "Burnout" was the second most-aired music video in Norway during summer 2003.

Their second album Loud Enough to Raise the Dead was released in March 2006. The music video for "Rock 'n' Roll Forever" was filmed at Oslo Spektrum and directed by Bjørn Opsahl, who had also directed the video for "Burnout." Also in 2005, they contributed to the Kiss tribute album Gods of Thunder: A Norwegian Tribute to Kiss and Leaving Home - A Norwegian Tribute to the Ramones.

The Carburetors released their third album Rock'n'Roll Forever, which featured nine old and six new songs, on Bodog Records in 2008. Because this album was only available in Norway, it was re-released in 2010 to the rest of Europe via Evil Wheels Records. They signed a new record deal with I Hate People Records and a publishing deal with Universal Music Publishing in 2011.

The following year, they participated in the Melodi Grand Prix 2012, where Norway chose its representative for the Eurovision Song Contest 2012. Along with Reidun Sæther and Nora Foss Al-Jabri, they advanced to the Grand Final for their song "Don't Touch the Flame," but were ultimately eliminated in the first round. In 2015, they released their eleven-song album Laughing in the Face of Death which, unlike other albums that edit instruments together in post-production, was performed in a studio and recorded as one might record a live album.

== Members ==
- Eddie Guz – lead vocals (2001-present)
- Chris Marchand – lead guitar (2015-present)
- Anders "Rock" Søbakk - guitar (2023-present)(
- Chris Nitro – drums (2001-present)
- King O'Men – bass (2001-present)

=== Former members ===
- Kai Kidd – guitar (2001-2023)
- Stian Krogh – lead guitar (2001-2015)

== Discography ==
=== Albums ===
- Pain Is Temporary, Glory Is Forever (2004)
- Loud Enough to Raise the Dead (2006)
- Live – Wild at Heart, Berlin (2007) – live mini album
- Rock'n'Roll Forever (2008) - Norway only
- Rock'n'Roll Forever (2010) – Europe
- Laughing in the Face of Death (2015)

=== Singles ===
- "Burning Rubber" (2002)
- "Fast Forward Rock'n'Roll" (2002)
- "Burnout" (2003)
- "God Damn (It's Good to Be Right)" (2005)
- "Feel Alive" (2008)
- "Don't Touch the Flame" (2012)
