= Serbia in the Eurovision Song Contest 2012 =

- Eurovision Song Contest 2012
- Participating broadcaster: Radio Television of Serbia (RTS)
- Country: Serbia
- Selection process: Internal selection
- Announcement date: Artist: 18 November 2011; Song: 10 March 2012

Competing entry
- Song: "Nije ljubav stvar"
- Artist: Željko Joksimović
- Songwriters: Željko Joksimović; Marina Tucaković; Miloš Roganović

Placement
- Semi-final result: Qualified (2nd, 159 points)
- Final result: 3rd, 214 points

Participation chronology

Serbia was represented at the Eurovision Song Contest 2012 with the song "Nije ljubav stvar" written by Željko Joksimović, Marina Tucaković and Miloš Roganović. The song was performed by Željko Joksimović, who had previously represented Serbia and Montentegro in the Eurovision Song Contest in 2004 where he placed second with the song "Lane moje". The Serbian national broadcaster, Radio Television of Serbia (RTS) internally selected the Serbian entry for the 2012 contest in Baku, Azerbaijan. Joksimović was announced as the Serbian representative on 18 November 2011, while the song, "Nije ljubav stvar", was presented on 10 March 2012 during a show titled Evropska pesma ("European song").

Serbia was drawn to compete in the second semi-final of the Eurovision Song Contest which took place on 24 May 2012. Performing as the opening entry for the show in position 1, "Nije ljubav stvar" was announced among the top 10 entries of the second semi-final and therefore qualified to compete in the final on 26 May. It was later revealed that Serbia placed second out of the 18 participating countries in the semi-final with 159 points. In the final, Serbia performed in position 24 and placed third out of the 26 participating countries, scoring 214 points.

== Background ==
Prior to the 2012 contest, Serbia had participated in the Eurovision Song Contest five times since its first entry in 2007, winning the contest with their debut entry "Molitva" performed by Marija Šerifović. Since 2007, four out of five of Serbia's entries have featured in the final with the nation failing to qualify in 2009. Serbia's 2011 entry "Čaroban" performed by Nina qualified to the final and placed fourteenth.

The Serbian national broadcaster, Radio Television of Serbia (RTS), broadcasts the event within Serbia and organises the selection process for the nation's entry. RTS confirmed their intentions to participate at the 2012 Eurovision Song Contest on 18 November 2011. Between 2007 and 2009, Serbia used the Beovizija national final in order to select their entry. However, after their 2009 entry, "Cipela" performed by Marko Kon and Milaan, failed to qualify Serbia to the final, the broadcaster shifted their selection strategy to selecting specific composers to create songs for artists. In 2010, RTS selected Goran Bregović to compose songs for a national final featuring three artists, while in 2011 Kornelije Kovač, Aleksandra Kovač and Kristina Kovač were tasked with composing one song each.

== Before Eurovision ==
=== Internal selection ===
RTS internally selected the Serbian entry for the Eurovision Song Contest 2012. The name of the artist to represent Serbia, Željko Joksimović was confirmed by RTS on 18 November 2011. Željko Joksimović previously represented Serbia and Montenegro in the Eurovision Song Contest 2004 where he placed second in the final with the song "Lane moje". Joksimović also previously composed the Bosnian and Serbian songs in 2006 and 2008, respectively, as well as co-hosted the Eurovision Song Contest 2008 alongside Jovana Janković which was held in Belgrade.

The song Željko Joksimović would perform at the Eurovision Song Contest titled "Nije ljubav stvar", which was written by Joksimović himself together with Serbian lyricists Marina Tucaković and Miloš Roganović, was presented in a show titled Evropska pesma ("European song") which took place at the studios of RTS in Košutnjak, Belgrade on 10 March 2012, hosted by Tamara Aleksić. The show was broadcast on RTS1, RTS HD and RTS Sat as well as streamed online via the broadcaster's website rts.rs and the official Eurovision Song Contest website eurovision.tv. Former Eurovision contestants Hari Mata Hari, who represented Bosnia in 2006, and Jelena Tomašević with Bora Dugić, who represented Serbia in 2008, as well as singers Ivan Bosiljčić and Halid Bešlić were featured as a guest performers during the show. An English language version of the entry titled "Synonym" was also recorded and performed during the show.

== At Eurovision ==
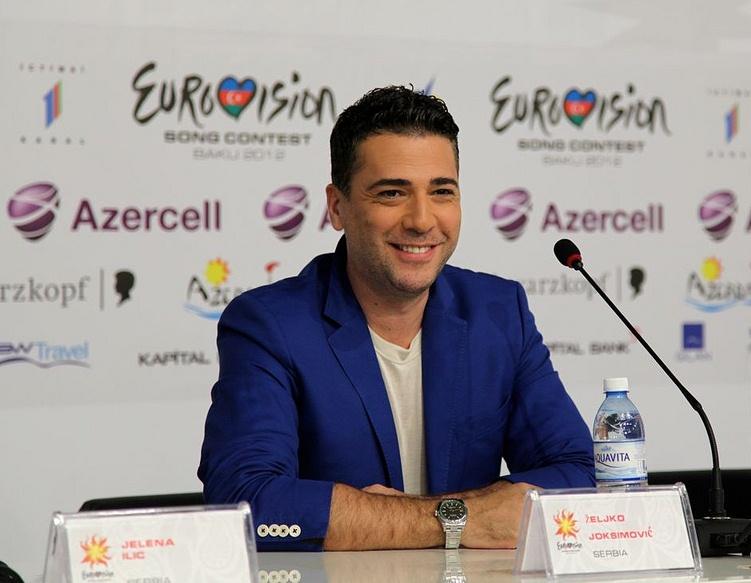
Željko Joksimović during a press meet and greet

According to Eurovision rules, all nations with the exceptions of the host country and the "Big Five" (France, Germany, Italy, Spain and the United Kingdom) are required to qualify from one of two semi-finals in order to compete for the final; the top ten countries from each semi-final progress to the final. The European Broadcasting Union (EBU) split up the competing countries into six different pots based on voting patterns from previous contests, with countries with favourable voting histories put into the same pot. On 25 January 2012, a special allocation draw was held which placed each country into one of the two semi-finals, as well as which half of the show they would perform in. Serbia was placed into the second semi-final, to be held on 24 May 2012, and was scheduled to perform in the first half of the show. The running order for the semi-finals was decided through another draw on 20 March 2012 and Serbia was set to open the show and perform in position 1, before the entry from Macedonia.

The two semi-finals and the final were broadcast in Serbia on RTS1, RTS HD and RTS Sat with commentary for the first semi-final by Dragan Ilić and commentary for the second semi-final and final by Duška Vučinić-Lučić. The Serbian spokesperson, who announced the Serbian votes during the final, was Maja Nikolić.

=== Semi-final ===
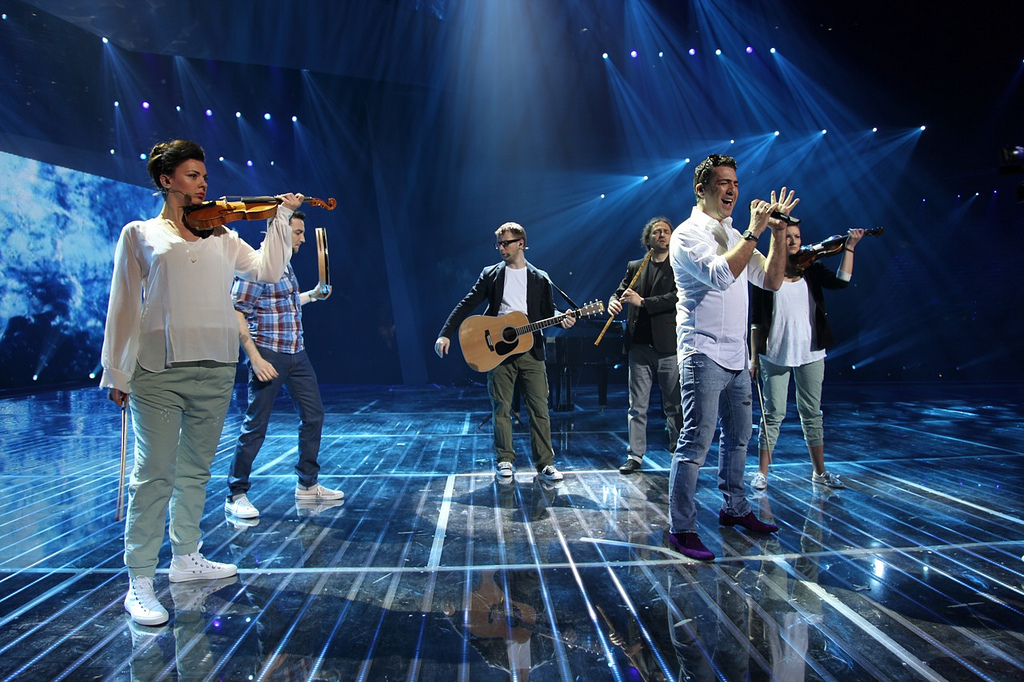
Željko Joksimović during a rehearsal before the second semi-final

Željko Joksimović took part in technical rehearsals on 15 and 18 May, followed by dress rehearsals on 23 and 24 May. This included the jury show on 23 May where the professional juries of each country watched and voted on the competing entries.

The Serbian performance featured Željko Joksimović performing together with four members of the Ad-Hoc Orchestra: Dragan Krstić (drums), Dušan Alagić (piano and guitar), Ksenija Milošević (violin), Miloš Nikolić (flute) and Olga Popović (violin), all in black outfits. The stage displayed yellow spotlights and the background LED screens predominately displayed dark blue and purple colours that resembled an outer space. The performance was concluded with all backing musicians joining Joksimović at the climax of the song.

At the end of the show, Serbia was announced as having finished in the top 10 and subsequently qualifying for the grand final. It was later revealed that Serbia placed second in the semi-final, receiving a total of 159 points.

=== Final ===
Shortly after the second semi-final, a winners' press conference was held for the ten qualifying countries. As part of this press conference, the qualifying artists took part in a draw to determine the running order for the final. This draw was done in the order the countries appeared in the semi-final running order. Serbia was drawn to perform in position 24, following the entry from Ireland and before the entry from Ukraine.

Željko Joksimović once again took part in dress rehearsals on 25 and 26 May before the final, including the jury final where the professional juries cast their final votes before the live show. Joksimović performed a repeat of his semi-final performance during the final on 26 May. Serbia placed third in the final, scoring 214 points.

=== Voting ===
Voting during the three shows consisted of 50 percent public televoting and 50 percent from a jury deliberation. The jury consisted of five music industry professionals who were citizens of the country they represent. This jury was asked to judge each contestant based on: vocal capacity; the stage performance; the song's composition and originality; and the overall impression by the act. In addition, no member of a national jury could be related in any way to any of the competing acts in such a way that they cannot vote impartially and independently.

Following the release of the full split voting by the EBU after the conclusion of the competition, it was revealed that Serbia had placed third with the public televote and second with the jury vote in the final. In the public vote, Serbia scored 211 points, while with the jury vote, Serbia scored 173 points. In the second semi-final, Serbia placed second with the public televote with 148 points and second with the jury vote, scoring 141 points.

Below is a breakdown of points awarded to Serbia and awarded by Serbia in the first semi-final and grand final of the contest. The nation awarded its 12 points to Croatia in the semi-final and to Macedonia in the final of the contest.

==== Points awarded to Serbia ====
Points awarded to Serbia (Semi-final 2)
Score	Country
12 points	Bulgaria; France; Macedonia; Slovenia
10 points	Bosnia and Herzegovina; Croatia; Georgia; Germany; Netherlands; Norway
8 points	Belarus; Portugal; Slovakia; Sweden; Ukraine
7 points	
6 points	
5 points	Malta
4 points	
3 points	United Kingdom
2 points	Lithuania
1 point	Estonia

Points awarded to Serbia (Final)
Score	Country
12 points	Bulgaria; Croatia; Montenegro; Slovenia
10 points	Austria; Bosnia and Herzegovina; Germany; Macedonia; Netherlands; Norway; Sweden; Switzerland
8 points	France; Greece
7 points	Cyprus; Slovakia
6 points	Italy; San Marino
5 points	Belgium; Lithuania; Malta; Portugal; Romania
4 points	Hungary; Russia
3 points	Iceland; Moldova
2 points	Finland; Ukraine
1 point	Albania

==== Points awarded by Serbia ====
Points awarded by Serbia (Semi-final 2)
Score	Country
12 points	Croatia
10 points	Slovenia
8 points	Macedonia
7 points	Sweden
6 points	Lithuania
5 points	Bosnia and Herzegovina
4 points	Ukraine
3 points	Malta
2 points	Bulgaria
1 point	Slovakia

Points awarded by Serbia (Final)
Score	Country
12 points	Macedonia
10 points	Sweden
8 points	Cyprus
7 points	Russia
6 points	Malta
5 points	Bosnia and Herzegovina
4 points	Greece
3 points	Azerbaijan
2 points	Hungary
1 point	Albania
