= France in the Eurovision Song Contest 2012 =

- Eurovision Song Contest 2012
- Participating broadcaster: France Télévisions
- Country: France
- Selection process: Internal selection
- Announcement date: Artist: 29 November 2011; Song: 29 January 2012

Competing entry
- Song: "Echo (You and I)"
- Artist: Anggun
- Songwriters: William Rousseau; Jean-Pierre Pilot; Anggun

Placement
- Final result: 22nd, 21 points

Participation chronology

France was represented at the Eurovision Song Contest 2012 with the song "Echo (You and I)" written by William Rousseau, Jean-Pierre Pilot and Anggun, and performed by Anggun. The French broadcaster France Télévisions in collaboration with the television channel France 3 internally selected the French entry for the 2012 contest in Baku, Azerbaijan. Anggun was officially announced by France 3 as the French entrant on 29 November 2011 and later the song was presented to the public as the contest entry during a press conference on 29 January 2012.

As a member of the "Big Five", France automatically qualified to compete in the final of the Eurovision Song Contest. Performing in position 9, France placed twenty-second out of the 26 participating countries with 21 points.

== Background ==
Prior to the 2012 contest, France had participated in the Eurovision Song Contest fifty-four times since its debut as one of seven countries to take part in 1956. France first won the contest in 1958 with "Dors, mon amour" performed by André Claveau. In the 1960s, they won three times, with "Tom Pillibi" performed by Jacqueline Boyer in 1960, "Un premier amour" performed by Isabelle Aubret in 1962 and "Un jour, un enfant" performed by Frida Boccara, who won in 1969 in a four-way tie with the Netherlands, Spain and the United Kingdom. France's fifth victory came in 1977, when Marie Myriam won with the song "L'oiseau et l'enfant". France have also finished second four times, with Paule Desjardins in 1957, Catherine Ferry in 1976, Joëlle Ursull in 1990 and Amina in 1991, who lost out to Sweden's Carola in a tie-break. In the 21st century, France has had less success, only making the top ten three times, with Natasha St-Pier finishing fourth in 2001, Sandrine François finishing fifth in 2002 and Patricia Kaas finishing eighth in 2009.

The French national broadcaster, France Télévisions, broadcasts the event within France and delegates the selection of the nation's entry to the television channel France 3. France 3 confirmed that France would participate in the 2012 Eurovision Song Contest on 19 November 2011. The French broadcaster had used both national finals and internal selection to choose the French entry in the past. From 2008 to 2011, the broadcaster opted to internally select the French entry, a procedure that was continued in order to select the 2012 entry.

== Before Eurovision ==
=== Internal selection ===
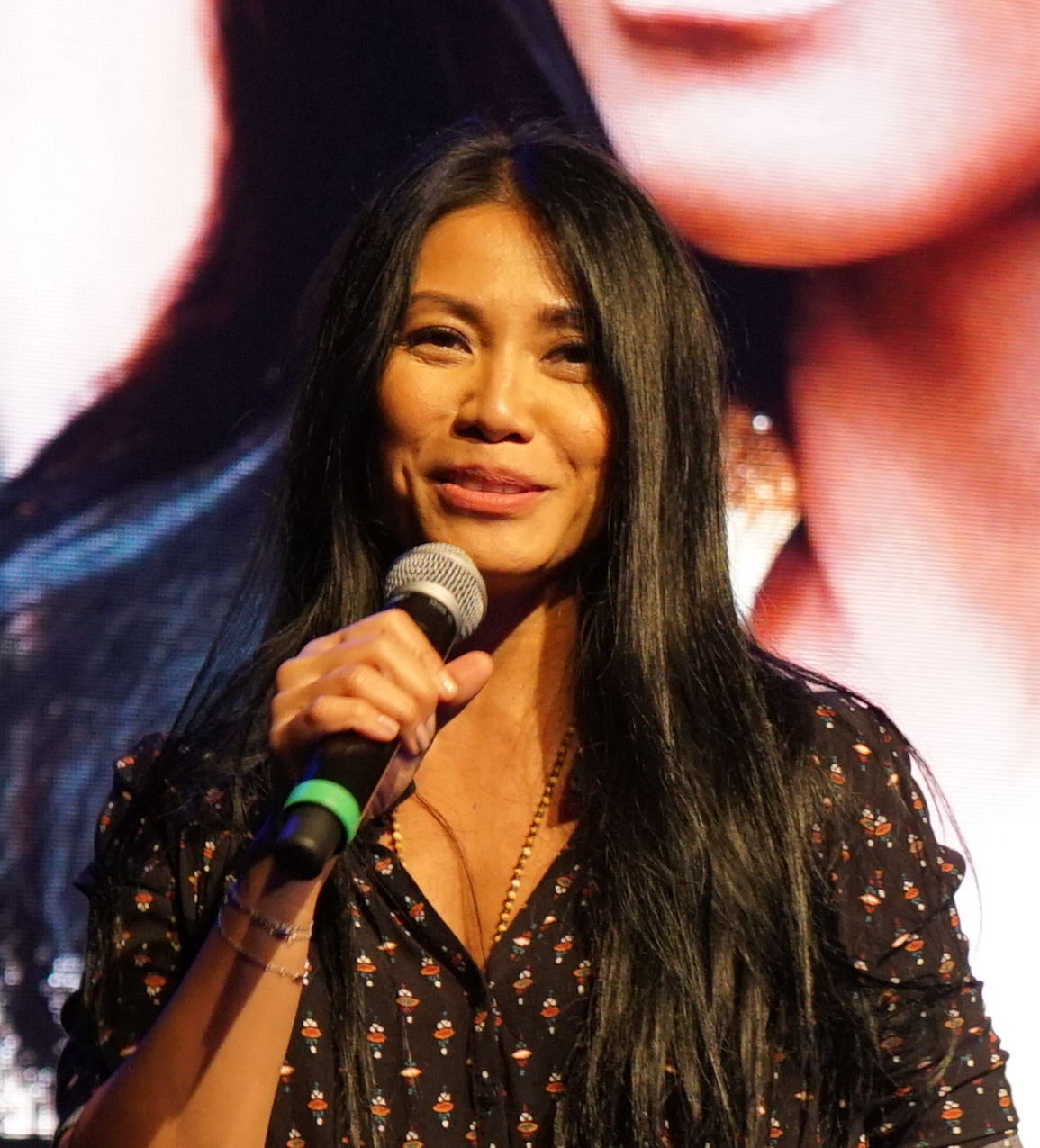
Anggun was internally selected to represent France in the Eurovision Song Contest 2012

France 3 announced in late 2011 that the French entry for the 2012 Eurovision Song Contest would be selected internally. The organisation of the internal selection was headed by France 3 entertainment director Marie-Claire Mezerette. On 29 November 2011, France 3 announced that the French entrant for the Eurovision Song Contest 2012 would be Indonesian-French singer Anggun. Her song "Echo (You and I)" was written by William Rousseau, Jean-Pierre Pilot and Anggun and contains lyrics in a bilingual mix of French and English. The entry was formally presented to the public on 29 January 2012 during a press conference held at the Blue Lounge of the Palais des Festivals in Cannes.

=== Promotion ===
Anggun made several appearances across Europe to specifically promote "Echo (You and I)" as the French Eurovision entry. Anggun performed "Echo (You and I)" during several Eurovision national finals: in Malta on 6 February, in Ukraine on 18 February, in Slovenia on 26 February, in Bulgaria on 29 February, in Romania on 10 March, and in Greece on 12 March. On 21 April, Anggun performed during the Eurovision in Concert event which was held at the Melkweg venue in Amsterdam, Netherlands and hosted by Cornald Maas and Ruth Jacott. On 23 April, Anggun performed during the London Eurovision Party, which was held at the Shadow Lounge venue in London, United Kingdom and hosted by Nicki French and Paddy O'Connell. On 12 May, Anggun performed in Hungary during the third live show of the RTL talent show Csillag Születik.

== At Eurovision ==
According to Eurovision rules, all nations with the exceptions of the host country and the "Big Five" (France, Germany, Italy, Spain and the United Kingdom) are required to qualify from one of two semi-finals in order to compete for the final; the top ten countries from each semi-final progress to the final. As a member of the "Big 5", France automatically qualified to compete in the final on 26 May 2012. In addition to their participation in the final, France is also required to broadcast and vote in one of the two semi-finals. During the semi-final allocation draw on 25 January 2012, France was assigned to broadcast and vote in the second semi-final on 24 May 2012.

In France, the two semi-finals was broadcast on France Ô with commentary by Audrey Chauveau and Bruno Berberes, while the final was broadcast on France 3 with commentary by Cyril Féraud and Mireille Dumas, as well as via radio on France Bleu with commentary by Fabien Lecœuvre and Serge Poezevara. The French spokesperson, who announced the French votes during the final, was Amaury Vassili who represented France in the 2011 Contest.

=== Final ===
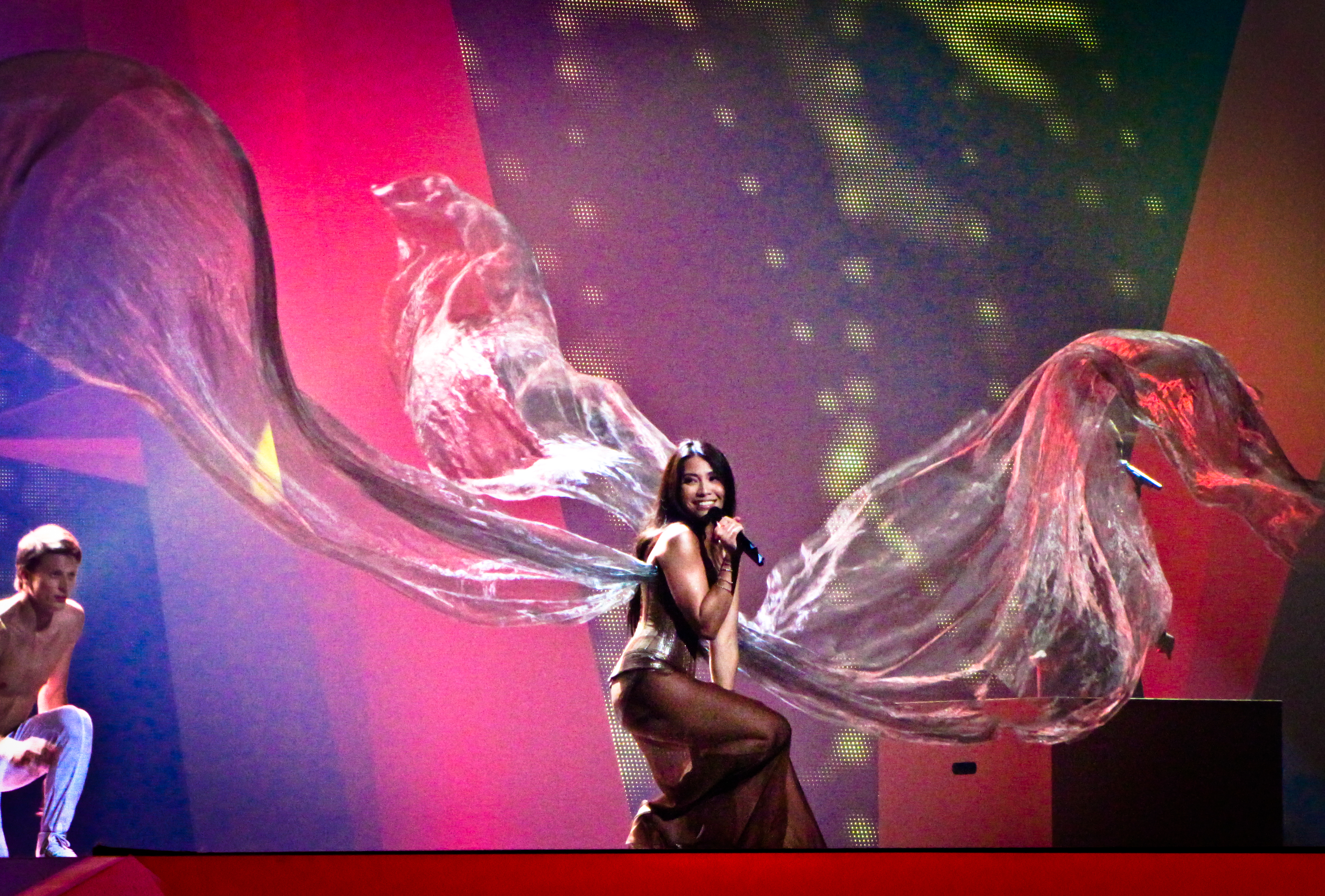
Anggun during a rehearsal before the final

Anggun took part in technical rehearsals on 19 and 20 May, followed by dress rehearsals on 25 and 26 May. This included the jury final on 25 May where the professional juries of each country watched and voted on the competing entries. After technical rehearsals were held on 20 May, the "Big 5" countries and host nation Azerbaijan held a press conference. As part of this press conference, the artists took part in a draw to determine the running order for the final and France was subsequently placed to perform in position 9, following the entry from Cyprus and before the entry from Italy.

The French performance featured Anggun on stage wearing a golden veiled dress designed by French designer Jean-Paul Gaultier and performing the song with three dancers: Jimmy Bourcereau, Jeremy Maupilet and Andrea Catozzi, all performing an artistic choreography on three boxes and lifted up Anggun at the conclusion of the performance, which was shown in slow motion. The stage colours and lighting were both predominately blue. Anggun was also joined on stage by two backing vocalists: Caroline Devismes and Sebastien Demeaux. France placed twenty-second in the final, scoring 21 points.

=== Voting ===
Voting during the three shows consisted of 50 percent public televoting and 50 percent from a jury deliberation. The jury consisted of five music industry professionals who were citizens of the country they represent, with their names published before the contest to ensure transparency. This jury was asked to judge each contestant based on: vocal capacity; the stage performance; the song's composition and originality; and the overall impression by the act. In addition, no member of a national jury could be related in any way to any of the competing acts in such a way that they cannot vote impartially and independently. The individual rankings of each jury member were released shortly after the grand final.

Following the release of the full split voting by the EBU after the conclusion of the competition, it was revealed that France had placed twenty-sixth with the public televote and thirteenth with the jury vote. In the public vote, France scored 0 points and in the jury vote the nation scored 85 points.

Below is a breakdown of points awarded to France and awarded by France in the second semi-final and grand final of the contest, and the breakdown of the jury voting and televoting conducted during the two shows:

==== Points awarded to France ====
Points awarded to France (Final)
Score	Country
12 points	
10 points	
8 points	
7 points	
6 points	Iceland; Switzerland
5 points	
4 points	
3 points	Latvia
2 points	Austria; Bosnia and Herzegovina; Sweden
1 point	

==== Points awarded by France ====
Points awarded by France (Semi-final 2)
Score	Country
12 points	Serbia
10 points	Estonia
8 points	Portugal
7 points	Turkey
6 points	Sweden
5 points	Lithuania
4 points	Bosnia and Herzegovina
3 points	Bulgaria
2 points	Ukraine
1 point	Slovakia

Points awarded by France (Final)
Score	Country
12 points	Sweden
10 points	Estonia
8 points	Serbia
7 points	Germany
6 points	Spain
5 points	Turkey
4 points	Russia
3 points	Lithuania
2 points	Romania
1 point	Italy
