= Portugal in the Eurovision Song Contest 2012 =

- Eurovision Song Contest 2012
- Participating broadcaster: Rádio e Televisão de Portugal (RTP)
- Country: Portugal
- Selection process: Festival da Canção 2012
- Selection date: 10 March 2012

Competing entry
- Song: "Vida minha"
- Artist: Filipa Sousa
- Songwriters: Andrej Babić; Carlos Coelho

Placement
- Semi-final result: Failed to qualify (13th)

Participation chronology

Portugal was represented at the Eurovision Song Contest 2012 with the song "Vida minha" written by Andrej Babić and Carlos Coelho, and performed by Filipa Sousa. The Portuguese participating broadcaster, Rádio e Televisão de Portugal (RTP), organised the national final Festival da Canção 2012 in order to select its entry for the contest. The competition took place on 10 March 2012 where "Vida minha" performed by Filipa Sousa emerged as the winner after achieving the highest score following the combination of votes from twenty regional juries and a public televote.

Portugal was drawn to compete in the second semi-final of the Eurovision Song Contest which took place on 24 May 2012. Performing during the show in position 6, "Vida minha" was not announced among the top 10 entries of the second semi-final and therefore did not qualify to compete in the final. It was later revealed that Portugal placed thirteenth out of the 18 participating countries in the semi-final with 39 points.

== Background ==
Prior to the 2012 contest, Radiotelevisão Portuguesa (RTP) until 2003, and Rádio e Televisão de Portugal (RTP) since 2004, had participated in the Eurovision Song Contest representing Portugal forty-five times since their first entry in 1964. Their highest placing in the contest was sixth, achieved in 1996 with the song "O meu coração não tem cor" performed by Lúcia Moniz. Following the introduction of semi-finals for the 2004, Portugal had featured in only three finals. Their least successful result has been last place, achieved on three occasions, most recently in 1997 with the song "Antes do adeus" performed by Célia Lawson. They have also received nul points on two occasions: in 1964 and 1997. The nation failed to qualify to the final in 2011 with the song "A luta é alegria" performed by Homens da Luta.

As part of its duties as participating broadcaster, RTP organises the selection of its entry in the Eurovision Song Contest and broadcasts the event in the country. Despite consideration to withdraw due to the economic crisis in the country, RTP confirmed its participation in the 2012 contest on 25 November 2011. RTP has traditionally selected its entry for the contest via the music competition Festival da Canção, with exceptions in 1988 and in 2005 when the entries were internally selected. Along with its participation confirmation, RTP revealed details regarding its selection procedure and announced the organization of Festival da Canção 2012 in order to select the 2012 Portuguese entry.

== Before Eurovision ==
=== Festival da Canção 2012 ===
The logo of Festival da Canção 2012

Festival da Canção 2012 was the 48th edition of Festival da Canção that selected Portugal's entry for the Eurovision Song Contest 2012. Twelve entries competed in the competition which took place on 10 March 2012 at RTP's Studio 1 in Lisbon. The show was hosted by Sílvia Alberto and Pedro Granger and broadcast on RTP1, RTP1 HD, RTP África and RTP Internacional as well as online via the broadcaster's official website rtp.pt.

==== Competing entries ====
Artists that possessed Portuguese citizenship were able to submit their applications for the competition online between 9 December 2011 and 31 December 2011. Auditions were held at the RTP Headquarters in Lisbon on 5 and 6 January 2012 and in Porto on 10 and 11 January 2012 where over 400 applicants performed in front of a jury panel consisting of Portuguese Head of Delegation for the Eurovision Song Contest José Poiares and music producers Fernando Martins and Ramón Galarza. Nine artists without any previous music career were selected following the auditions and an additional three were selected out of the auditions as established artists with previously released work: Carlos Costa, Ricardo Soler and Rui Andrade. Twelve composers were then invited by RTP to create songs in Portuguese and the fado genre for the performers, with Martins and Galarza working in coordination with the composers on the production of the songs. The competing artists were revealed on 13 January 2012, while the selected composers were revealed on 28 January 2012. The composers were:

- Andrej Babić
- Armando Teixeira
- João Só
- Johnny Galvão
- Menito Ramos
- Miguel Gameiro
- Nuno Feist
- Tiago Dias
- Tozé Brito
- Tozé Santos (Tó Zé)
- Miguel Majer
- Jorge Fernando

Artist	Song	Songwriter(s)
Arménio Pimenta	"Um poema na bagagem"	Menito Ramos
Carlos Costa	"Queres que eu dance?"	João Só
Cúmplices	"Será o que será"	Johnny Galvão, Rui Reis
Filipa Sousa	"Vida minha"	Andrej Babić, Carlos Coelho
Gerson Santos	"Redescobrir Portugal"	Tó Zé
Joana Leite	"Amor é maior que a vida"	Tiago Dias, Marisa Liz
Pamela Salvado	"Fica a saudade"	Miguel Gameiro
Pedro Macedo	"Outono em forma de gente"	Pedro Marques, Daniela Varela, Jaime Oliveira
Ricardo Soler	"Gratia plena"	Nuno Feist, Nuno Silva
Rui Andrade	"Amor a preto e branco"	Miguel Majer, Inês Vaz
Tó Martins	"Amanhã começa o meu futuro"	Tozé Brito
Vânia Osório	"O mundo passa"	Armando Teixeira

==== Final ====
The final took place on 10 March 2012. Twelve entries competed the winner, "Vida minha" performed by Filipa Sousa, was selected based on the 50/50 combination of votes of twenty regional juries and a public televote. In addition to the performances of the competing entries, Ana Laíns, Bruno Correia and Yolanda Soares performed as the interval acts.

Final – 10 March 2012
R/O	Artist	Song	Jury		Televote		Total	Place
R/O	Artist	Song	Votes	Points	Percentage	Points	Total	Place
1	Ricardo Soler	"Gratia plena"	109	5	13.38%	8	13	4
2	Pedro Macedo	"Outono em forma de gente"	38	0	6.23%	5	5	8
3	Tó Martins	"Amanhã começa o meu futuro"	88	4	1.62%	0	4	11
4	Gerson Santos	"Redescobrir Portugal"	43	1	1.90%	0	1	12
5	Joana Leite	"Amor é maior que a vida"	78	3	3.55%	2	5	8
6	Pamela Salvado	"Fica a saudade"	123	8	5.41%	4	12	5
7	Cúmplices	"Será o que será"	151	10	7.36%	6	16	2
8	Arménio Pimenta	"Um poema na bagagem"	69	2	4.60%	3	5	8
9	Carlos Costa	"Queres que eu dance?"	30	0	14.66%	10	10	6
10	Vânia Osório	"O mundo passa"	115	6	2.77%	1	7	7
11	Rui Andrade	"Amor a preto e branco"	119	7	13.17%	7	14	3
12	Filipa Sousa	"Vida minha"	197	12	25.28%	12	24	1

Detailed Regional Jury Votes
R/O	Song	Aveiro	Beja	Braga	Bragança	Castelo Branco	Coimbra	Évora	Faro	Madeira	Guarda	Leiria	Lisbon	Azores	Portalegre	Porto	Santarém	Setúbal	Viana do Castelo	Vila Real	Viseu	Total score
1	"Gratia plena"		7	7	8	10	8		2		4	7	12	5	10	2	7	12	5		3	109
2	"Outono em forma de gente"				1	7			7	1	2	2			3		2	2	2	5	4	38
3	"Amanhã começa o meu futuro"	3	2	2	2	5	7	8	10	4	5		5	4		4	10		6	1	10	88
4	"Redescobrir Portugal"	1	8			3	5	3		2	3		1	2	1	1	1	6	3	3		43
5	"Amor é maior que a vida"	5	3	3	7	1	1	10	6	7		6		3	4	5	8	4	1	2	2	78
6	"Fica a saudade"	8	4	10	5	8	6	7	1		7	3	8	7	5	8	12	5	7	7	5	123
7	"Será o que será"	10	10	6	10		10	6	4	10	10	10	10	12	6	10	6	3	4	6	8	151
8	"Um poema na bagagem"	4	1	4	3	6	2	4	5	6		1	4	1	7		4		8	8	1	69
9	"Queres que eu dance?"	2		1			3	1	8	3	1	5	2			3		1				30
10	"O mundo passa"	7	5	8	4	12		5	3	8	8	8	6	8	8	7		7		4	7	115
11	"Amor a preto e branco"	6	6	5	6	2	2	12		12	6	4	3	6	2	6	3	10	10	10	6	119
12	"Vida minha"	12	12	12	12	4	12	2	12	5	12	12	7	10	12	12	5	8	12	12	12	197

=== Promotion ===
Filipa Sousa made several appearances across Europe to specifically promote "Vida minha" as the Portuguese Eurovision entry. On 21 April, Filipa Sousa performed during the Eurovision in Concert event which was held at the Melkweg venue in Amsterdam, Netherlands and hosted by Cornald Maas and Ruth Jacott. She also performed during the London Eurovision Party on 29 April, which was held at the Shadow Lounge venue in London, United Kingdom and hosted by Nicki French and Paddy O'Connell.

== At Eurovision ==
According to Eurovision rules, all nations with the exceptions of the host country and the "Big Five" (France, Germany, Italy, Spain and the United Kingdom) are required to qualify from one of two semi-finals in order to compete for the final; the top ten countries from each semi-final progress to the final. The European Broadcasting Union (EBU) split up the competing countries into six different pots based on voting patterns from previous contests, with countries with favourable voting histories put into the same pot. On 20 January 2014, a special allocation draw was held which placed each country into one of the two semi-finals, as well as which half of the show they would perform in. Portugal was placed into the second semi-final, to be held on 24 May 2012, and was scheduled to perform in the first half of the show. The running order for the semi-finals was decided through another draw on 20 March 2012 and Portugal was set to perform in position 6, following the entry from Belarus and before the entry from Ukraine.

In Portugal, the three shows were broadcast on RTP1, RTP1 HD and RTP Internacional with commentary by Pedro Granger. The second semi-final and the final were broadcast live, while the first semi-final was broadcast on delay. The Portuguese spokesperson, who announced the Portuguese votes during the final, was Joana Teles.

=== Semi-final ===
Filipa Sousa took part in technical rehearsals on 15 and 18 May, followed by dress rehearsals on 23 and 24 May. This included the jury final where professional juries of each country watched and voted on the competing entries. The Portuguese performance featured Filipa Sousa wearing a golden dress performing a routine choreographed by Marco de Camillis, with five backing vocalists lined up behind the singer: Carla Ribero, Eduardo Marques, Filipe Fontenele, Joana Inacio and Pedro Coelho. The LED screens displayed images of old Lisbon.

At the end of the show, Portugal was not announced among the top 10 entries in the second semi-final and therefore failed to qualify to compete in the final. It was later revealed that Portugal placed thirteenth in the semi-final, receiving a total of 39 points.

=== Voting ===
Voting during the three shows involved each country awarding points from 1-8, 10 and 12 as determined by a combination of 50% national jury and 50% televoting. Each nation's jury consisted of five music industry professionals who are citizens of the country they represent. This jury judged each entry based on: vocal capacity; the stage performance; the song's composition and originality; and the overall impression by the act. In addition, no member of a national jury was permitted to be related in any way to any of the competing acts in such a way that they cannot vote impartially and independently.

Following the release of the full split voting by the EBU after the conclusion of the competition, it was revealed that Portugal had placed thirteenth with the public televote and twelfth with the jury vote in the first semi-final. In the public vote, Portugal scored 37 points, while with the jury vote, Portugal scored 49 points.

Below is a breakdown of points awarded to Portugal and awarded by Portugal in the second semi-final and grand final of the contest. The nation awarded its 12 points to Estonia in the semi-final and to Spain in the final of the contest.

==== Points awarded to Portugal ====
Points awarded to Portugal (Semi-final 2)
Score	Country
12 points	
10 points	
8 points	France
7 points	
6 points	Netherlands
5 points	Norway; Slovakia
4 points	Bosnia and Herzegovina
3 points	Croatia; Germany; Slovenia
2 points	
1 point	Lithuania; Turkey

==== Points awarded by Portugal ====
Points awarded by Portugal (Semi-final 2)
Score	Country
12 points	Estonia
10 points	Sweden
8 points	Serbia
7 points	Lithuania
6 points	Bulgaria
5 points	Bosnia and Herzegovina
4 points	Slovakia
3 points	Norway
2 points	Ukraine
1 point	Georgia

Points awarded by Portugal (Final)
Score	Country
12 points	Spain
10 points	Germany
8 points	Russia
7 points	Estonia
6 points	Moldova
5 points	Serbia
4 points	Romania
3 points	Sweden
2 points	Italy
1 point	Ukraine

==== Detailed voting results ====
Semi-final 2

Jury points awarded in second semi-final:

12 points	Estonia
10 points	Serbia
8 points	Bosnia and Herzegovina
7 points	Slovakia
6 points	Sweden
5 points	Georgia
4 points	Croatia
3 points	Malta
2 points	Belarus
1 point	Slovenia

Final

Jury points awarded in the final:

12 points	Spain
10 points	Germany
8 points	Estonia
7 points	Serbia
6 points	Italy
5 points	Bosnia and Herzegovina
4 points	France
3 points	Albania
2 points	Iceland
1 point	Russia
