= Turkey in the Eurovision Song Contest 2012 =

- Eurovision Song Contest 2012
- Participating broadcaster: Türkiye Radyo ve Televizyon Kurumu (TRT)
- Country: Turkey
- Selection process: Internal selection
- Announcement date: Artist: 9 January 2012; Song: 22 February 2012

Competing entry
- Song: "Love Me Back"
- Artist: Can Bonomo
- Songwriters: Can Bonomo

Placement
- Semi-final result: Qualified (5th, 80 points)
- Final result: 7th, 112 points

Participation chronology

Turkey was represented at the Eurovision Song Contest 2012 with the song "Love Me Back" written and performed by Can Bonomo. The Turkish participating broadcaster, Türkiye Radyo ve Televizyon Kurumu (TRT), internally selected its entry for the contest.

Turkey was drawn to compete in the second semi-final of the Eurovision Song Contest which took place on 26 May 2012. Performing during the show in position 13, "Love Me Back" was announced among the top 10 entries of the first semi-final and therefore qualified to compete in the final on 14 May. It was later revealed that Turkey placed 5th out of the 18 participating countries in the semi-final with 80 points. In the final, Turkey performed in position 18 and placed 7th out of the 26 participating countries, scoring 112 points.

As of 2026, this was the last Turkish entry in the contest, before TRT opted out of participating the following year. The absence has continued in every edition since.

== Before Eurovision ==
=== Internal selection ===
On 22 September 2011, Türkiye Radyo ve Televizyon Kurumu (TRT) opened the suggestions for the public to nominate potential artists for consideration. On 9 January 2012, TRT announced during the TRT 1 evening news bulletin that singer Can Bonomo had been internally selected to represent Turkey in Baku. Prior to the announcement of Can Bonomo as the Turkish representative, rumoured artists in Turkish media included Atiye, Hande Yener, Kıraç and Sıla. Three songs were submitted by Bonomo to the broadcaster in February 2012 and a selection committee selected "Love Me Back" as the song they would perform at the contest.

On 22 February 2012, "Love Me Back" was presented to the public during a television special which took place at the TRT Tepebaşı Studios in Istanbul, hosted by Işık Özden and Husniyya Maharramova. The show was broadcast on TRT 1 and TRT Müzik as well as online via the broadcaster's official website trt.net.tr and the official Eurovision Song Contest website eurovision.tv. The song was written by Can Bonomo himself.

== At Eurovision ==
Turkey competed in the second half of the second semi-final (13th on stage), on 24 May 2012, following Georgia and preceding Estonia. Can Bonomo received 80 points and placed 5th, thus qualifying for the final on 26 May. The public awarded Turkey 4th place with 114 points and the jury awarded 13th place with 42 points.

In the final, Turkey was drawn to perform 18th, after Sweden and preceding Spain. The Turkish entry scored a total of 112 points and placed 7th in the final, with the public awarding Turkey 4th place with 176 points and the jury awarding 22nd place with 50 points.

=== Voting ===
==== Points awarded to Turkey ====
Points awarded to Turkey (Semi-final 2)
Score	Country
12 points	Malta
10 points	Macedonia
8 points	Bulgaria
7 points	France; Netherlands; Sweden
6 points	Bosnia and Herzegovina; Germany; United Kingdom
5 points	
4 points	
3 points	Georgia; Slovakia
2 points	Estonia; Ukraine
1 point	Norway

Points awarded to Turkey (Final)
Score	Country
12 points	Azerbaijan
10 points	Albania
8 points	Germany; Macedonia; Malta; Netherlands
7 points	Belgium; Bulgaria; Georgia
6 points	Sweden
5 points	France; San Marino
4 points	Bosnia and Herzegovina
3 points	Austria; Hungary; Romania; Switzerland
2 points	Denmark
1 point	Israel; Lithuania; United Kingdom

==== Points awarded by Turkey ====
Points awarded by Turkey (Semi-final 2)
Score	Country
12 points	Bosnia and Herzegovina
10 points	Bulgaria
8 points	Macedonia
7 points	Netherlands
6 points	Malta
5 points	Sweden
4 points	Norway
3 points	Georgia
2 points	Lithuania
1 point	Portugal

Points awarded by Turkey (Final)
Score	Country
12 points	Azerbaijan
10 points	Bosnia and Herzegovina
8 points	Macedonia
7 points	Russia
6 points	Sweden
5 points	Albania
4 points	Romania
3 points	Greece
2 points	Malta
1 point	Hungary
