= Håvard Lothe =

Norwegian musician (born 1982)

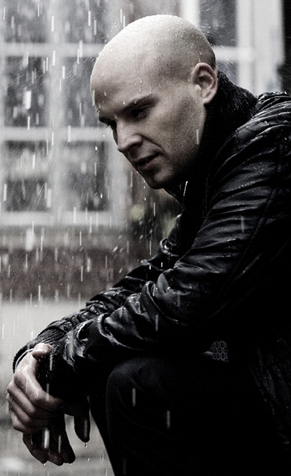

Background information
- Born: 1982 (age 43–44)
- Origin: Norway
- Occupation: Singer

Håvard Lothe (born 1982) is a Norwegian musician who released his first album, Live in Concert in 2007, which reached number 32 on the Norwegian Albums Chart.

== Band members ==
- Håvard Lothe – vocals, guitars, mandolin
- Erlend Mongstad – piano, synthesizer, rhodes, organ
- Thomas Frøyen – drums, percussion
- Torstein Mongstad – bass guitar, double bass
- Werner Bryn – cello

== Discography ==
- Live in Concert, Reel Noise Records (Released 3 September 2007)
- Dorian Grey, Reel Noise Records (Released 31 August 2009)
