= Sati (singer) =

Lithuanian singer (born 1976)

Sati Mackevičiūtė
- Also known as: Sati; Matangi
- Born: Violeta; April 11, 1976 (age 50); Klaipėda, Lithuania
- Genres: alternative pop, world music, ambient
- Occupations: Musician, songwriter
- Instrument: vocals
- Years active: 1991–present
- Member of: Agama

Violeta "Sati" Mackevičiūtė (born April 11, 1976 in Klaipėda) is a Lithuanian singer, a member of band Agama.

== Biography ==
Sati was born in a family of a lawyer and a journalist in Klaipėda, Lithuania. At the age of seven started attending music school. Her teacher was one of the notable Lithuanian opera singers Onutė Glinskaitė – her influence was significant for then young singer, and is noticeable in Sati's pop music career.

In the beginning of her career Sati performed under the stage name "Violette" (later – "Crazy Violette '). She first sang pop music ballads, and participated in many musical competitions and festivals in Lithuania ("Metamarfozės 2000", "Klasikos diversijos 2001", "Mes irgi galime mylėti", "Pop Art", "Muzikinis Viešbutis"). Sati also contributed to the musical careers of other Lithuanian musicians (most notable – Andrius Mamontovas) by recording her voice for their songs.

Sati is known having a strong (95.8 decibels) and diversive voice. In 2000, she became a winner of the Lithuanian contest "Throat 2000" as the owner of the strongest voice.

Sati's musical styles range from pop to progressive dance music. In 2000–2004 she was highly praised by Lithuanian music critics. Sati received good reviews from German music critics and the biggest German music TV channel Viva, too.

Singer states her motto simply is "Happiness, love and peace". Her music, as she describes, is influenced by artists such as Björk, Stina Nordenstam, Achillea, Jon Hopkins, Abdullah Kobayashi, Lisa Gerrard, Enigma.

Sati was married from 2001 and 2009. She has three sons. They are Ąžuolas, Arijas, and Indra.

She actively advocates for a healthy lifestyle without any drugs or alcohol, and is a vegetarian.

Sati with a project Agama participated in Lithuanian musical contest to Eurovision 2010. She presented ethnic ethereal style song "Fields of Kings" which was performed in Sanskrit. Agama got a four place among 12 participants. By the way Sati Awarded a special LATGA-A prize for the best songwriting.
