= Nebo =

Nebo may refer to:

== In religion and mythology ==
- Nebo (biblical town), a Biblical town
- Mount Nebo, place for biblical events
- Nebo (god), a Babylonian god

== Places ==
=== Australia ===
- Nebo, Queensland, a town in coastal Queensland
- Shire of Nebo, Queensland

=== Ivory Coast ===
- Nébo, a town and sub-prefecture in Gôh-Djiboua District

=== South Africa ===
- Nebo, Limpopo, a town

=== United States ===
- Nebo, Georgia, an unincorporated community in Paulding County
- Nebo, Illinois, a village
- Nebo, Kentucky, a city
- Nebo, Louisiana, a small town; see Jena High School
- Nebo, Missouri, an unincorporated community
- Nebo, North Carolina, an unincorporated community
- Nebo, Ohio, an extinct town
- Nebo (Struthers, Ohio), a neighborhood in Mahoning County
- Nebo, Virginia, an unincorporated community
- Nebo, Clay County, West Virginia, an unincorporated community
- Nebo, Upshur County, West Virginia, an unincorporated community
- Nebo Center, California, neighborhood and former census-designated place in Barstow
- Nebo National Forest, Utah
- Nebo School District, a school district in Utah County, Utah

=== Wales ===
- Nebo, Anglesey, a hamlet
- Nebo, Ceredigion, a location in the U.K.
- Nebo, Conwy, a small village near Betws-y-Coed
- Nebo, Gwynedd, a village

=== Multiple countries ===
- Mount Nebo (disambiguation)

== Music ==
- "Nebo" (Anastasiya Petryk song)
- "Nebo" (Nina Badric song)
- NeBo, 2011 album by Nina Badrić

== People ==
- Josh Nebo (born 1997), American basketball player in the Israeli Premier League

== Other uses ==
- Nebo-M a Russian system of several different radars
- Nebo (scorpion), a genus of scorpions
- Nebo Road (Hamilton, Ontario), Canada

== See also ==
- Nebos, a German Thoroughbred racehorse
