= Papaya (disambiguation) =

Papaya is the fruit of the plant Carica papaya.

Papaya may also refer to:

== Music and dance ==
- Papaya (group), an all-girl pop music group from South Korea
- Papaya (singer) or Miss Papaya, stage names of Danish singer and musician Linnéa Handberg Lund
- Papaya Suzuki, a Japanese dancer and choreographer
- "Papaya", a song by Polish jazz vocalist Urszula Dudziak. It later saw a resurgence as a popular dance in East Asia
- "Pa Pa Ya!!", a song by Babymetal
- Papaya (club), a nightclub on Pag Island, Croatia

== Other ==
- Mountain papaya, a different plant sometimes called simply papaya
- PapayaMobile, a mobile social gaming network also known as Papaya
- Papaya, former name of General Tinio, a municipality in Nueva Ecija, Philippines
- Papaya Global, a financing service company

== See also ==
- Papaya Coconut, a1986 album by Kikki Danielsson
- Papaya King, a fast food restaurant in New York City
- Papaya whip, a pastel color
- Paw Paw (disambiguation)
