= Regardless (Raye and Rudimental song) =

- Hannah Wants remix cover

Single by Raye and Rudimental

from the album Euphoric Sad Songs
- Released: 20 November 2020
- Genre: Dance
- Length: 3:17
- Label: Polydor
- Songwriters: Rachel Keen; Nadia Ali; Markus Moser
- Producers: Punctual; Rudimental

Raye singles chronology
| "Love of Your Life" (2020) | "Regardless" (2020) | "Bed" (2021) |

Rudimental singles chronology
| "Be the One" (2020) | "Regardless" (2020) | "Be Somebody" (2021) |

Music video
- "Regardless" on YouTube

"Regardless" is a song by British singer-songwriter Raye and drum and bass band Rudimental, released on 20 November 2020 as the fifth single from Raye's debut mini-album, Euphoric Sad Songs. The song's music video was released on 8 January 2021."Regardless" peaked at number 37 on the UK Singles Chart and charted successfully in Eastern Europe, reaching number one in Bulgaria, and the top five in Romania and Russia.

== Background ==
"Regardless" was released for digital download and streaming as part of Raye's debut mini-album, Euphoric Sad Songs, on 20 November 2020. In the UK, the track was added to rotation by BBC Radio 1 on 18 December 2020, and BBC Radio 2 on 9 January 2021.

== Composition ==
"Regardless" is a club track with an electro-enhanced beat. Contact Music described Raye's vocals as "silky smooth" that "have a sultry sheen, [adding] a chic finish" to the track. Written by Raye, Nadia Ali and Markus Moser, it runs for a length of 3 minutes and 17 seconds. The song samples iiO's 2001 single, "Rapture", resulting in Ali and Moser's writing credit.

== Music video ==
The music video for "Regardless" premiered on 8 January 2021. In the video, Raye and her crew perform choreography to the track in an infinity pool.

== Track listing ==
- Digital download and streaming – Hannah Wants remix
1. "Regardless" (Hannah Wants remix) – 3:25
2. "Regardless" – 3:17
- Digital download and streaming – Acoustic
1. "Regardless" (acoustic) – 3:44

== Credits and personnel ==
Credits adapted from Tidal.

- Raye – songwriter, vocals
- Nadia Ali – songwriter
- Markus Moser – songwriter
- Punctual – producer
- Rudimental – producer
- Mark Ralph – additional producer, mixer
- Stuart Hawkes – mastering engineer

== Charts ==
=== Weekly charts ===
Weekly chart performance for "Regardless"
| Chart (2021) | Peak position |
|---|---|
| Belgium (Ultratip Bubbling Under Wallonia) | 2 |
| Bulgaria (PROPHON) | 1 |
| CIS Airplay (TopHit) | 3 |
| Croatia (HRT) | 47 |
| Ireland (IRMA) | 69 |
| Poland Airplay (ZPAV) | 11 |
| Romania (Airplay 100) | 3 |
| Russia Airplay (TopHit) | 4 |
| UK Singles (Official Charts) | 37 |
| Ukraine Airplay (TopHit) | 15 |
| US Hot Dance/Electronic Songs (Billboard) | 35 |

=== Year-end charts ===
2021 year-end chart performance for "Regardless"
| Chart (2021) | Position |
|---|---|
| Bulgaria (PROPHON) | 5 |
| CIS (TopHit) | 16 |
| Russia Airplay (TopHit) | 20 |
| Ukraine Airplay (TopHit) | 96 |

2022 year-end chart performance for "Regardless"
| Chart (2022) | Position |
|---|---|
| Russia Airplay (TopHit) | 182 |
| Ukraine Airplay (TopHit) | 80 |

2023 year-end chart performance for "Regardless"
| Chart (2023) | Position |
|---|---|
| Ukraine Airplay (TopHit) | 156 |

== Certifications ==
| Region | Certification | Certified units/sales |
|---|---|---|
| Brazil (Pro-Música Brasil) | Gold | 20,000^{‡} |
| Poland (ZPAV) | Gold | 25,000^{‡} |
| United Kingdom (BPI) | Silver | 200,000^{‡} |
^{‡} Sales+streaming figures based on certification alone.

== Release history ==
Release history for "Regardless"
| Region | Date | Format | Label | Ref. |
|---|---|---|---|---|
| Various | 20 November 2020 | Digital download; streaming | Polydor | |
| Italy | 15 January 2021 | Contemporary hit radio | Universal | |
