= NeBo =

Studio album by Nina Badrić
- Released: 2011
- Genre: Pop
- Length: 63:53
- Label: Aquarius Records

Nina Badrić chronology
07 (2007)	NeBo (2011)	Najdraži... Best Of 2003–2013 (2013)

NeBo is the seventh studio album by Croatian recording artist Nina Badrić, released in 2011 by Aquarius Records.

The album contains fourteen tracks. Badrić had a cooperation with Ante Gelo, Baby Dooks, D'Knock, Massimo Savić, Nikša Bratoš, Aleksandra Milutinović, Tihomir Preradović, Rastko Milošev, Dino Muharemović, Branimir Mihaljević and Antonija Šola.

Songs "Moje oči pune ljubavi", "Dat će nam Bog", "Nebo", "Sve mi pamti" and "Sanjam da smo skupa mi" were released as singles from the album.

== Track listing ==
No.	Title	Length
1.	"Neopisivo"	5:02
2.	"Ljudi od ljubavi"	4:04
3.	"Sve je u redu"	5:51
4.	"Nebo"	4:02
5.	"Sanjam da smo skupa mi"	4:22
6.	"Na zidu plača"	4:23
7.	"Sve mi pamti"	4:16
8.	"Moje oči pune ljubavi"	5:14
9.	"Dat će nam Bog"	3:46
10.	"Pokazat ću ti kako da se vratiš"	3:44
11.	"Velika ljubav"	5:50
12.	"Prospi riječi" (with Massimo)	4:08
13.	"Znam te ja"	4:52
14.	"Mama"	4:19
Total length:		63:53
