= Euphoric Sad Songs =

2020 EP / mini-album by Raye

EP / mini-album by Raye
- Released: 20 November 2020
- Recorded: 2018–2020
- Genre: Pop; R&B
- Length: 31:12
- Label: Polydor
- Producer: Fred Ball; John Blanda; Anton Goransson; John Hill; Paul Keen; Johan Lenox; Punctual; Mark Ralph; Regard; Rudimental; Fraser T Smith; TMS

Raye chronology
Side Tape (2018)	Euphoric Sad Songs (2020)	Euphoric Sad Songs (Dance Edition) (2020)

Singles from Euphoric Sad Songs
- 1. "Love Me Again" Released: 2 August 2019; 2. "Secrets" Released: 24 April 2020; 3. "Natalie Don't" Released: 10 July 2020; 4. "Love of Your Life" Released: 6 November 2020; 5. "Regardless" Released: 20 November 2020

Professional ratings
Review scores
Source	Rating
The Guardian	3/5 stars

Euphoric Sad Songs is the debut mini-album by British singer-songwriter Raye. It was released on 20 November 2020 through Polydor Records. The album was supported by the singles; "Love Me Again", "Secrets" with Regard, "Natalie Don't", "Love of Your life" and "Regardless" with Rudimental. Promotional single "Please Don't Touch" also preceded the project's release. A remix EP titled Euphoric Sad Songs (Dance Edition) was released on 28 December 2020.

== Release and promotion ==
In an interview with BBC News in July 2020, Raye initially announced that her fifth EP would be titled, Her Heart Beats in 4/4, and that it would be released later that same year, with the project being centered around the theme of "the seven stages of grief". Raye disclosed that she wrote the album during each stage of grief and that ultimately the creative process had healed her broken heart. It was also confirmed that the EP would include previously released singles "Love Me Again" and "Please Don't Touch". The album would later be re-titled Euphoric Sad Songs, with it being nine tracks in length. Raye would take to her social medias to announce that she will be hosting a Zoom call on 19 November 2020. The project was officially released on 20 November 2020. On 17 December 2020, MTV premiered a mini documentary which focused on the creative process of the album.

== Singles ==
In August 2019, Raye released the lead single "Love Me Again". A remix of the song with Jess Glynne was later released on 30 August 2019. The single peaked at Number 55 on the UK Singles Chart and has since been certified Silver.

"Secrets" with Regard was released as the second single on 24 April 2020. The single achieved commercial success in Europe, as well as reaching the top 10 on the US Billboard Dance/Electronic Songs chart. In the United Kingdom, the song peaked at number 6 on the UK Singles Chart and topped the UK Dance Chart, as well as later being certified Gold.

"Natalie Don't" was released as the third single on 10 July 2020 and would top the Russian Airplay chart as well as peak at number 35 in Scotland.

"Love of Your Life" was released as the fourth single on 6 November 2020. A music video for the song was premiered on Glamour Magazine's website on 12 November 2020.

"Regardless" with Rudimental was released as the fifth single alongside the release of the album on 20 November 2020. A music video was released on January 8, 2021.

=== Promotional singles ===
"Please Don't Touch", was released on 13 December 2019 as a promotional single.

== Track listing ==
Euphoric Sad Songs track listing
No.	Title	Lyrics	Music	Producer(s)	Length
1.	"Love Me Again"	Rachel Keen; Janée Bennett	Keen; Bennett	Fred Ball	3:18
2.	"Change Your Mind"	Keen; Isabella Sjostrand	Keen; Anton Goransson	Goransson	4:00
3.	"Regardless" (with Rudimental)	Keen; Nadia Ali	Keen; Markus Moser	Punctual; Rudimental; Mark Ralph^{[a]}	3:17
4.	"Secrets" (with Regard)	Keen; Jordan Asher Cruz; Kennedi Lykken	Dardan Aliu; John Hill; Stephen Feigenbaum	Regard; Hill; Johan Lenox	2:57
5.	"Natalie Don't"	Keen	Keen; Hill; John Blanda	Hill; Blanda	3:14
6.	"All Dressed Up"	Keen	Keen; Thomas Barnes; Peter Kelleher; Benjamin Kohn	TMS; Paul Keen	4:02
7.	"Please Don't Touch"	Keen; Camille Purcell	Keen; Purcell; Fraser Thorneycroft-Smith	Fraser T Smith	3:39
8.	"Walk on By"	Keen; Sjostrand	Chad Edwards; Keen; Goransson; Aaron Williams	Goransson	3:23
9.	"Love of Your Life"	Keen; Sjostrand	Keen; Goransson	Goransson	3:16
Total length:					31:12

== Charts ==
Chart (2020–2024)	Peak position
Lithuanian Albums (AGATA)	23
UK Album Downloads (OCC)	71
UK Physical Albums Chart (OCC)	93
UK Vinyl Albums Chart (OCC)	31

== Certifications ==
Certifications for Euphoric Sad Songs
Region	Certification	Certified units/sales
United Kingdom (BPI)	Silver	60,000^{‡}
^{‡} Sales+streaming figures based on certification alone.

== Release history ==
Region	Date	Format	Label	Ref.
Various	20 November 2020	Digital download; streaming	Polydor	
Europe	11 December 2020	CD	Polydor	
Various	25 June 2021	LP	Polydor	

== Euphoric Sad Songs (Dance Edition) ==
Euphoric Sad Songs (Dance Edition)

EP by Raye
- Released: 28 December 2020
- Recorded: 2020
- Genre: Dance
- Length: 13:07
- Label: Polydor
- Producer: John Blanda; Joel Corry; Anton Goransson; John Hill; Johan Lenox; MOTi; Punctual; Mark Ralph; Regard; Rudimental

Raye chronology
Euphoric Sad Songs (2020)	Euphoric Sad Songs (Dance Edition) (2020)	My 21st Century Blues (2023)

Singles from Euphoric Sad Songs (Dance Edition)
- 1. "Secrets (MOTi Remix)" Released: 8 July 2020; 2. "Natalie Don't (Punctual Remix)" Released: 13 August 2020; 3. "Regardless" Released: 20 November 2020; 4. "Regardless (Hannah Wants Remix)" Released: 18 February 2021

Euphoric Sad Songs (Dance Edition) is the first remix EP and fifth overall from British singer-songwriter Raye. The EP was released on 28 December 2020 through Polydor with no prior announcement. The EP features the single "Regardless" and 3 remixes of tracks from the original album. A reissue of the EP was later released in 2021 and includes 2 new remixes of "Love Of Your Life" as well as 3 new remixes of "Regardless".

Euphoric Sad Songs (Dance Edition) track listing
No.	Title	Writer(s)	Producer(s)	Length
1.	"Regardless" (with Rudimental)	Rachel Keen	Punctual; Rudimental; Mark Ralph^{[a]}	3:17
2.	"Love of Your Life" (Joel Corry Remix)	Keen; Isabella Sjostrand; Anton Goransson	Goransson; Joel Corry	2:58
3.	"Natalie Don't" (Punctual Remix)	Keen; John Hill; John Blanda	Hill; Blanda; Punctual	4:16
4.	"Secrets (MOTi Remix)" (with Regard)	Keen; Dardan Aliu; John Hill; Jordan Asher Cruz; Kennedi Lykken; Stephen Feigenbaum	Regard; Hill; Johan Lenox; Moti	2:35
Total length:				13:07

Euphoric Sad Songs (Dance Edition) 2021 Reissue
No.	Title	Writer(s)	Producer(s)	Length
1.	"Regardless" (with Rudimental)	Rachel Keen	Punctual; Rudimental; Mark Ralph^{[a]}	3:17
2.	"Regardless" (Hannah Wants Remix)	Keen	Hannah Wants; Punctual; Rudimental; Ralph^{[a]}	3:27
3.	"Regardless" (Liu remix)	Keen	Liu; Punctual; Rudimental; Ralph^{[a]}	3:37
4.	"Regardless" (Bhaskar Remix)	Keen	Bhaskar; Punctual; Rudimental; Ralph]]^{[a]}	3:34
5.	"Love of Your Life" (DES3ETT Remix)	Keen; Isabella Sjostrand; Anton Goransson	Goransson; DES3ETT	3:02
6.	"Love of Your Life" (Farfetch'd Remix)	Keen; Sjostrand; Goransson	Goransson; Farfetch'd	3:42
7.	"Love of Your Life" (Joel Corry Remix)	Keen; Isabella Sjostrand; Anton Goransson	Goransson; Joel Corry	2:58
8.	"Natalie Don't" (Punctual Remix)	Keen; John Hill; John Blanda	Hill; Blanda; Punctual	4:16
9.	"Secrets (MOTi Remix)" (with Regard)	Keen; Dardan Aliu; John Hill; Jordan Asher Cruz; Kennedi Lykken; Stephen Feigenbaum	Regard; Hill; Johan Lenox; Moti	2:35
Total length:				30:28
