= Love Me Again =

Love Me Again may refer to:

== Film and television ==
- Love Me Again (film), a 2009 Filipino film
- Love Me Again (TV series), a 2010 Filipino TV series by ABS-CBN

== Music ==
- Love Me Again (album), a 1978 album by Rita Coolidge
- "Love Me Again" (John Newman song), 2013
- "Love Me Again" (Raye song), 2019
- "Love Me Again" (V song), 2023
- "Love Me Again", a 1954 song by Alma Cogan, B-side to "Bell Bottom Blues"
- "Love Me Again", a 1958 song written by Eddie Snyder and a single for Jodie Sands, Jimmy Young, Eve Boswell, Dickie Valentine, Petula Clark
- "Love Me Again", a 1978 song by Rita Coolidge and 1980 single by Patti Austin written by David Lasley and Allee Willis
- "Love Me Again", a 1993 song by Luther Vandross from Never Let Me Go
- "Love Me Again", a song by Anika Moa from her 2010 album Love in Motion
- "Love Me Again", a song by Big Time Rush from their 2013 album 24/Seven
- "(I'm Gonna) Love Me Again", a 2019 song from the biopic Rocketman, performed by Elton John and Taron Egerton
