= Poraka =

Poraka Порака
- Poraka album cover

Studio album by Kaliopi
- Released: Macedonia; 2010
- Studio: Studio D'Knock Production, Studio Slow Mo'T.Production, Studio Šišmiš, Mozus Studio Production, Global Studio Sweden
- Genre: Pop
- Label: Kaliopi Music Production
- Producer: Darko Juranović "D'Knock"

Kaliopi chronology
Oblivion (2009)	Poraka; Порака (2010)	Melem (2013)

Singles from Poraka
- 1. "Poraka" Released: 2009; 2. "Ti" Released: 2010; 3. "Nesum Kako Ti" Released: 2010

Poraka (in Macedonian: Порака, English: Message) is the sixth solo album by the Macedonian singer Kaliopi, released in the 2010.

== Background ==
The follow-up album to Oblivion, Kaliopi worked with different producers on Poraka. There are 10 new songs in the album. Co-production was by Tihomir Preradović and mastering was completed at GS Global Studio in Sweden. The album cover was shot by Dejan Milicevic.

== Production history ==
The complete album is made by different producers and Kaliopi. It was recorded in different studios like studio D'Knock Production, Studio Slow Mo'T.Production. It contains 10 songs with different styles. The cover is made by Dejan Milicevic from Serbia and the graphic design is by Bojan Sredojević. It was released in 2010 together with the music video for the song "Poraka" and Serbian version of album "Poruka".

== Track listings ==
1. "Poraka" (4:10)
  Credits: Kaliopi/D.Juranović-Kaliopi-T.Preradović
  lyrics: D.Juranović "D'Knock"
2. "Ne sum Kako Ti" (3:28)
  Credits: D.Juranović/M.Rus/T.Preradović
  arrangement: R.Grill
  lyrics: Kaliopi/M.Rus-D.Juranović "D'Knock"/T.Preradović
3. "Tvoja" (3:17)
  Credits: D.Juranović, Kaliopi-D.Juranović "D'Knock"/T.Preradović
4. "Ti" (3:27)
  Credits: D.Juranović/Kaliopi/T.Preradović
  lyrics: Kaliopi-T.Preradović/D.Juranović "D'Knock"
5. "Pej Mi" (3:42)
  Credits: Kaliopi/D.Juranović-Kaliopi-T.Preradović/D.Juranović "D'Knock"
6. "Dojdi feat.Rambo Amadeus" (3:02)
  Credits: D.Juranović/Kaliopi-Rambo Amadeus-D.Juranović "D'Knock"/T.Preradović"
7. "Zemi Me" (3:55)
  Credits: Kaliopi-Kaliopi-P.Bogdanović/T.Preradović/D.Juranović "D'Knock"
8. "Bam baram bam" (3:47)
  Credits: Kaliopi/D.Juranović-Kaliopi-D.Juranović "D'Knock"/T.Preradović
9. "Denot Se Budi" (4:40)
  music: Kaliopi-Marko Vozelj-T.Preradović/D.Juranović "D'Knock"
10. "Ako još ikad padne snijeg feat.Edin Karamazov" (5:04)
  Credits: M.Rus-М.Rus-Т.Preradović/D.Juranović "D'Knock"/Е.Karamazov
