= Hideout Festival =

Annual electronic music festival in Zrce, Croatia

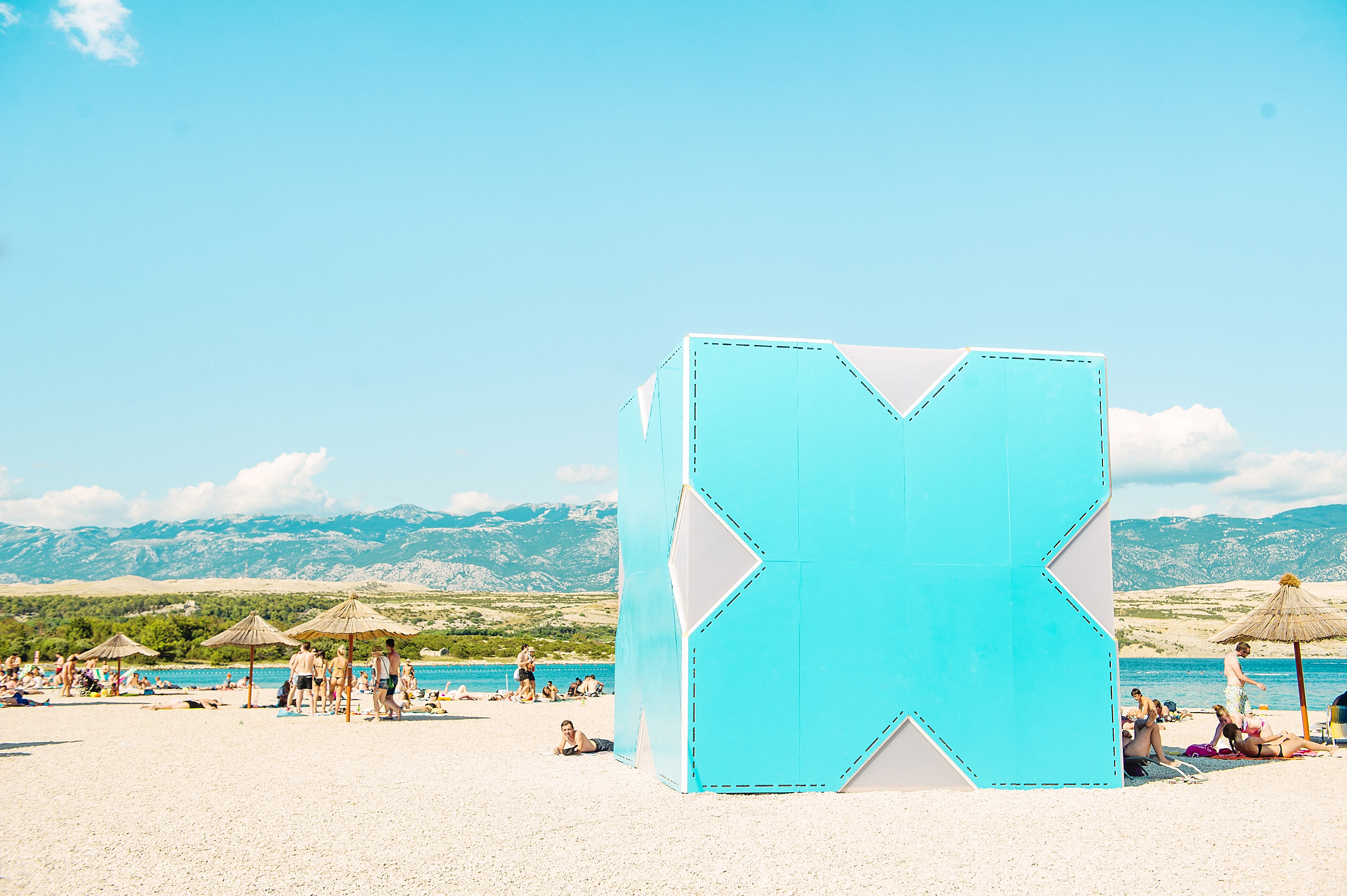
- Genre: Electronic dance
- Dates: June — July
- Locations: Zrce, Pag island, Croatia
- Years active: 2011 – Present
- Website: https://www.hideoutfestival.com/

Hideout Festival is an annual electronic music festival held in Zrce, Croatia on the island of Pag. The first festival was in 2011, and landed on The Guardian's list of the best European festivals of 2011, and since then, has sold out every year to date. The event is split between pool parties in the day and headline performances at night, both of which take place in Zrce's open-air venues along the beach. There's also a number of boat parties that sail from Novalja port out onto the Adriatic In 2016, Hideout Festival took place from Sunday 26 June until Thursday 30 June. It was the first year that BBC Radio 1 teamed up with the event for a 3-hour broadcast from a live pool party event hosted by Heidi, Monki and B Traits.In 2017 Hideout festival will take place from Monday 26th – Friday 30 June 2017. 5 days and nights, with over 150 artists including MK and Hannah Wants. It is owned and operated by Global.

Previous guests have included Seth Troxler, Nina Kraviz, SBTRKT, Ricardo Villalobos, Annie Mac, Skrillex, Four Tet, Andy C, Jamie Jones, DJ EZ, Pendulum, Modeselektor, Disclosure, Rudimental, Solumun, Sasha, Derrick Carter, Gorgon City, Eats Everything, Jamie XX, Hot Since 82 and Hannah Wants. For the 2016 edition, Hideout expanded to include Grime artists on the bill, such as Skepta, Preditah and Stormzy.

The lineup for the 2019 festival included MK, Patrick Topping, Camelphat, Alan Fitzpatrick, and Sonny Fodera. It took place from the 1st to 5th of July 2019.

== See also ==
- List of electronic music festivals
