= Natalie Don't =

2020 single by Raye

Single by Raye

from the album Euphoric Sad Songs
- Released: 10 July 2020
- Recorded: 2020
- Genre: Pop
- Length: 3:14
- Label: Polydor
- Composers: Rachel Keen; John Blanda; John Hill
- Lyricist: Raye
- Producers: Blanda; John Hill

Raye singles chronology
| "Secrets" (2020) | "Natalie Don't" (2020) | "Love of Your Life" (2020) |

Music video
- "Natalie Don't" on YouTube

"Natalie Don't" is a song by British singer-songwriter Raye released on 10 July 2020 as the third single from her debut mini-album, Euphoric Sad Songs. The track was written by Raye, John Blanda and John Hill and produced by the two latter. An accompanying music video was released alongside the song on 10 July 2020.

== Background and composition ==
The track is about that feeling of panic you have when you know you’re losing someone. The song is beautifully hopeless because you know Natalie will do what she wants regardless.

— Raye talking of Natalie Don't

Raye discussed the song's subject matter stating that the song "is my modern day Jolene" after experiencing a situation where her friend came between Raye and her partner at the time. She goes onto say; "This is why I love music because you can spin something really ugly and negative into something fabulous. I'm almost glad that it happened because now I have a great song to tell my story." Before the release of the single, Raye stated that the song was her favourite song she has ever released.

== Music video ==
A music video directed by Fiona Jane Burgess was premiered alongside the single's release on 10 July 2020. The video consists of Raye in a pink, vintage bedroom acting out her own guide of how to get over a relationship.

== Critical reception ==
Philip Logan of CelebMix praised the song calling the track "brooding, introspective and confessional" and adding "this is RAYE at her most frank and honest, delivering the songs relatable and conversational lyrics with delicate fragility, and blunt candour – yet still with a hint of that trademark “Rachel Agatha Keen” sass that we’ve all grown to love! As whilst there’s a genuine and tangible feeling of vulnerability that runs through the track, underneath all of the hurt, we uncover RAYE’s steely determination and willingness to forsake her own broken heart, to go into battle to try and win back the affection of her man."

Mark Savage of BBC News expressed similar praises stating that the track was "a funky, modern successor to [Dolly] Parton's classic, [Jolene].

== Track listing ==
Digital download
| No. | Title | Length |
|---|---|---|
| 1. | "Natalie Don't" | 3:14 |

Digital download
| No. | Title | Length |
|---|---|---|
| 1. | "Natalie Don't" (Punctual Remix) | 4:16 |

Digital download
| No. | Title | Length |
|---|---|---|
| 1. | "Natalie Don't" (Acoustic) | 3:22 |

Digital download
| No. | Title | Length |
|---|---|---|
| 1. | "Natalie Don't" (PS1 Remix) | 3:16 |

== Charts ==
=== Weekly charts ===
2020 weekly chart performance for "Natalie Don't"
| Chart (2020) | Peak position |
|---|---|
| CIS Airplay (TopHit) | 2 |
| Israel International Airplay (Media Forest) | 5 |
| Romania (Airplay 100) | 16 |
| Russia Airplay (TopHit) | 1 |
| Scottish Singles Sales (Official Charts) | 35 |
| Ukraine Airplay (TopHit) | 66 |
| UK Singles Downloads (Official Charts) | 30 |

2021 weekly chart performance for "Natalie Don't"
| Chart (2021) | Peak position |
|---|---|
| CIS Airplay (TopHit) | 38 |
| Russia Airplay (TopHit) | 43 |
| Ukraine Airplay (TopHit) | 5 |

2022 weekly chart performance for "Natalie Don't"
| Chart (2022) | Peak position |
|---|---|
| CIS Airplay (TopHit) | 68 |
| Russia Airplay (TopHit) | 98 |
| Ukraine Airplay (TopHit) | 9 |

2023 weekly chart performance for "Natalie Don't"
| Chart (2023) | Peak position |
|---|---|
| Kazakhstan Airplay (TopHit) | 100 |
| Ukraine Airplay (TopHit) | 58 |

2025 weekly chart performance for "Natalie Don't"
| Chart (2025) | Peak position |
|---|---|
| Belarus Airplay (TopHit) | 93 |

=== Monthly charts ===
Monthly chart performance for "Natalie Don't"
| Chart (2020–2025) | Peak position |
|---|---|
| Belarus Airplay (TopHit) | 98 |
| CIS Airplay (TopHit) | 3 |
| Russia Airplay (TopHit) | 2 |
| Ukraine Airplay (TopHit) | 8 |

=== Year-end charts ===
2020 year-end chart performance for "Natalie Don't"
| Chart (2020) | Position |
|---|---|
| CIS Airplay (TopHit) | 38 |
| Russia Airplay (TopHit) | 36 |

2021 year-end chart performance for "Natalie Don't"
| Chart (2021) | Position |
|---|---|
| CIS Airplay (TopHit) | 85 |
| Russia Airplay (TopHit) | 188 |
| Ukraine Airplay (TopHit) | 21 |

2022 year-end chart performance for "Natalie Don't"
| Chart (2022) | Position |
|---|---|
| CIS Airplay (TopHit) | 133 |
| Ukraine Airplay (TopHit) | 45 |

2023 year-end chart performance for "Natalie Don't"
| Chart (2023) | Position |
|---|---|
| Ukraine Airplay (TopHit) | 183 |

2025 year-end chart performance for "Natalie Don't"
| Chart (2025) | Position |
|---|---|
| Belarus Airplay (TopHit) | 137 |
