= Nina Badrić =

Croatian singer-songwriter (born 1972)

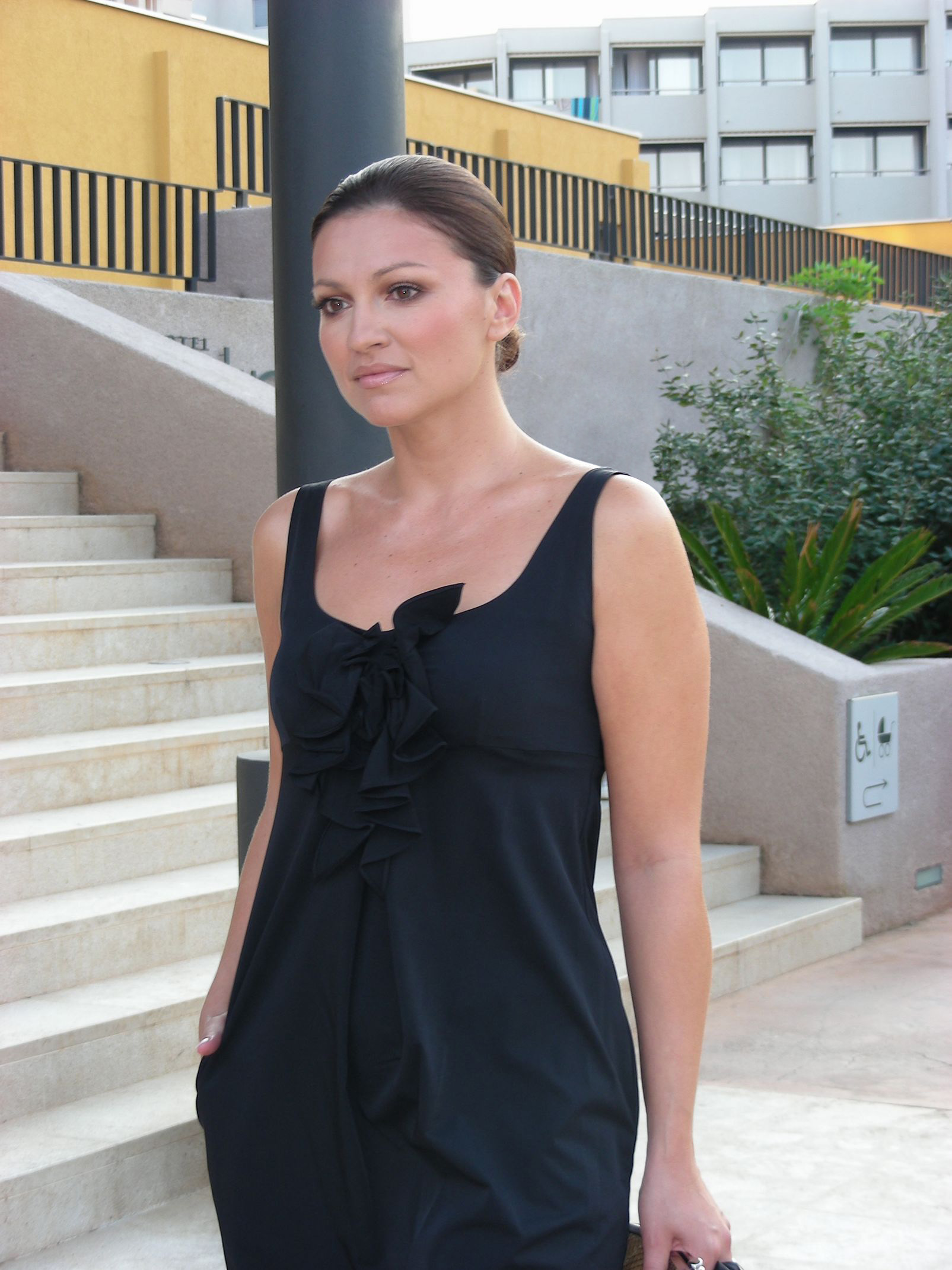
- Badrić in 2007
- Born: Nina Badrić; 4 July 1972 (age 54); Zagreb, SR Croatia, SFR Yugoslavia (now Croatia)
- Occupations: Singer; voice actress
- Spouse: Bernard Krasnić (m. 2006; div. 2012)
- Musical career
- Genres: R&B; pop; soul; adult contemporary; gospel
- Instruments: Vocals; piano
- Years active: 1993–present

Nina Badrić (pronounced [nîna bâdrit͡ɕ]; born 4 July 1972) is a Croatian pop singer and songwriter. She began performing in the early 1990s, and competed in "Dora" – the Croatian selection for Eurovision Song Contest 4 times. She won 7th place in 1993 with "Ostavljam te", 10th place in 1994 with "Godine nestvarne", 18th place in 1995 with "Odlaziš zauvijek", and second place in 2003 with "Čarobno jutro". Badrić eventually represented Croatia in the Eurovision Song Contest 2012 in Baku, Azerbaijan with the song "Nebo". She finished 12th in the second semi-final and failed to qualify for the grand final.

== Early life ==
Nina Badrić was born on July 4, 1972 in Zagreb, attended primary school "Otokar Keršovani", and started singing in the children's choir Zvjezdice at the age of nine. She spent seven years in the choir, while she began doing backing vocals with performers such as the Parni valjak, Prljavo kazalište and others.

== Career ==
=== Early career ===
In the early 1990s she was discovered by Dino Dvornik who helped develop her career. Later, she had her first major appearance on Crovizija, where she competed with the song "Ostavljam te", in collaboration with Rajko Dujmić, Jasenko Houra and her first manager Daniel Koletić. Shortly after that she signed her first professional contract with Croatia Records and in 1995 released her first album Godine nestvarne. However, Nina first achieved major success in duet with singer Emilija Kokić on the song "Ja sam vlak" (I am a train). Badrić released her second album Personality in 1997 with the record label Zg Zoe Music. Nina won two Porins in 1998 for best female vocal performance and best album of pop and classical music.

She has also covered the song "I'm So Excited" by American R&B group the Pointer Sisters, receiving a degree of international recognition most notably in Italy. Due to the international success of the dance version of the song, she released a dance album, Me!, with the record label Dance Factory, on which she sang in English. She also appeared on the song "Gimme Sunshine" by the band Banditos Bonitos.

In 1999 she released the 13 track album Unique, including two versions of the song "Woman in Love" by Barbra Streisand and also a remix of "Po dobru ti me pamti". She collaborated with a number of Croatian musicians, including Boytronic.

=== 2000–present ===
With the single "Nek ti bude kao meni", Nina announced her fourth album, Nina, released in 2000, through the label Croatia Records. It contained twelve songs and was produced by Darko Juranović. It featured the second single "Ako kažeš da me ne voliš" that was supported by a video. In 2003 she released a compilation, Collection, and her fourth studio album Ljubav, consisting of thirteen tracks. The songs "Čarobno jutro" and "Za dobre i loše dane" were released as singles.

On 14 February 2005, Badrić performed at the Dom sportova in Zagreb, in support of the campaign by UNICEF to house abandoned children. The concert was filmed and the same year Badrić released a live album on double CDs, Ljubav za ljubav – Live, released through Aquarius Records. In November 2007, she released her seventh studio album, 07. The album opens with the song "Kralj života mog", which is a duet with Romani diva Ljiljana Petrović-Buttler. The tracklist contains another duet, "Ne dam te nikom" with Montell Jordan. The album was recorded over two years and produced by Steve Sidwell. In November 2011, Nina released the album NeBo.

Badrić represented Croatia at the Eurovision Song Contest 2012 in Baku, Azerbaijan with the song "Nebo". She performed in the second semi-final and failed to reach the top ten and final cutoff, at 12th place with 42 points.

After the Eurovision Song Contest, Badrić embarked on an arena tour of the region. In 2013, Badrić recorded a duet "Duše su se srele" with Bosnian singer Mirza Šoljanin. In January 2015, she recorded another duet, called "Lozinka za raj", with Serbian singer Željko Vasić.

In 2016, Badrić recorded a song "Želim živjeti", together with Shorty, Ivana Husar, Marija Husar, Palić Sisters, Alan Hržica and band Emanuel in support of an anti-abortion campaign. In July 2016, Badrić performed her song "Dani i godine" at the wedding of Ana Ivanovic and Bastian Schweinsteiger.

In 2026, Badrić released her newest album Moji ljudi containing new material and singles from the previous few years like "Alive" and "Nemoj" (duet with Petar Grašo).

== Personal life ==
She married Bernard Krasnić in 2006; they divorced in 2012. During the campaign for the 2007 Croatian parliamentary election, Badrić performed at a number of fundraising events for the Croatian Democratic Union. She is a devout Roman Catholic. She made pilgrimages to Lourdes, Medjugorje and Šurkovac.

== Discography ==
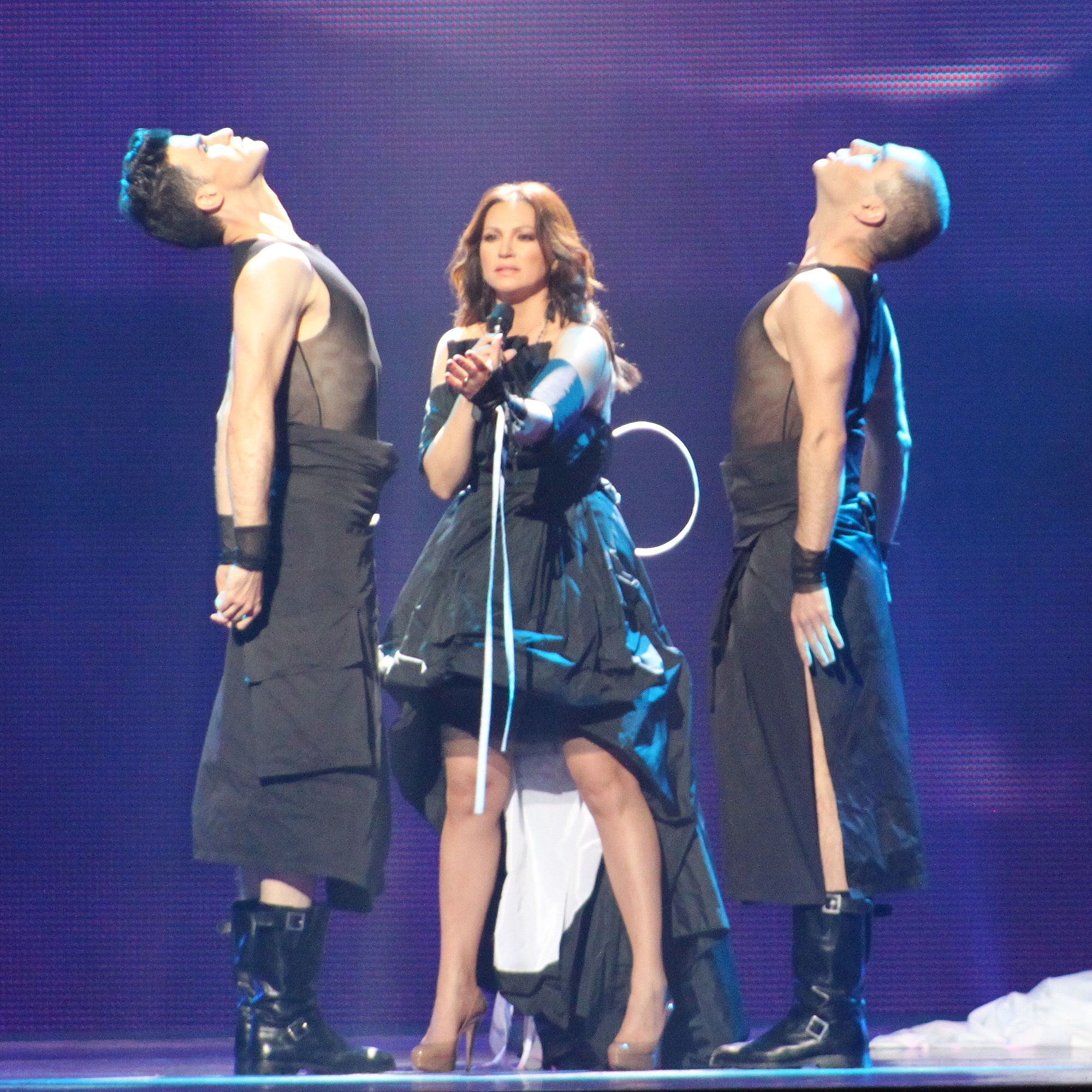
Badrić performing at Eurovision Song Contest 2012

=== Studio albums ===
Title	Details	Peak chart positions
Title	Details	CRO
Godine nestvarne	Released: 1995; Formats: Cassette, CD, digital download, streaming; Label: Croatia Records	(Note: Top of the Shops was launched in 2002 but a partial archive is only available from 2006 onwards.)
Personality	Released: 1997; Formats: Cassette, CD, digital download, streaming; Label: Scardona Records	(Note: Top of the Shops was launched in 2002 but a partial archive is only available from 2006 onwards.)
Me!	Released: 1998; Formats: Cassette, CD, digital download, streaming; Label: Dance Factory	(Note: Top of the Shops was launched in 2002 but a partial archive is only available from 2006 onwards.)
Unique	Released: 1999; Formats: Cassette, CD, digital download, streaming; Label: Croatia Records	(Note: Top of the Shops was launched in 2002 but a partial archive is only available from 2006 onwards.)
Nina	Released: 2000; Formats: Cassette, CD, digital download, streaming; Label: Croatia Records	(Note: Top of the Shops was launched in 2002 but a partial archive is only available from 2006 onwards.)
Ljubav	Released: 2003; Formats: Cassette, CD, digital download, streaming; Label: Aquarius Records	(Note: Top of the Shops was launched in 2002 but a partial archive is only available from 2006 onwards.)
07	Released: 2007; Formats: CD, digital download, streaming; Label: Aquarius Records	1
NeBo	Released: 2011; Formats: CD, digital download, streaming; Label: Aquarius Records	1
Peristil sentimenti	Released: 10 June 2022; Formats: digital download, streaming; Label: Aquarius Records	—
Moji ljudi	Released: 13 February 2026; Formats: CD, digital download, streaming; Label: Aquarius Records	1

=== Singles ===
Title	Year	Peak chart positions	Album
Title	Year	CRO	Album
"Ostavljam te"	1993	*	Non-album single
"Godine nestvarne"	1994	*	Godine nestvarne
"Da li ikada"	1995	*	Godine nestvarne
"Ja sam vlak" (with Emilija Kokić)	1995	*	Ostavi trag
"Ja za ljubav neću moliti"	1997	*	Personality
"Trebam te"	1997	*	Personality
"Ako odeš ti"	1998	1	Personality
"Na kraj svijeta"	1999	1	Unique
"Tko si ti"	1999	2	Unique
"Nije mi svejedno"	1999	2	Unique
"Nek ti bude kao meni"	2000	2	Nina
"Ako kažeš da me ne voliš"	2000	1	Nina
"Ostavljam ti sve"	2000	2	Nina
"Pomiluj ljubav moju"	2001	5	Non-album single
"Čarobno jutro"	2003	1	Ljubav
"Za dobre i loše dane"	2003	1	Ljubav
"Takvi kao ti"	2003	1	Ljubav
"Moja ljubav"	2004	1	Ljubav
"Ti si mene" (with Dino Merlin)	2004	2	Burek
"Imati pa nemati"	2007	7	07
"Da se opet tebi vratim"	2007	2	07
"Kralj života mog" (with Ljiljana Petrović Buttler)	2008	2	07
"Osjećaj"	2008	3	07
"Dodiri od stakla"	2008	1	07
"Ne mogu ti reći što je tuga" (with Hari Mata Hari)	2009	1	07
"Ne dam te nikom"	2009	1	07
"Znam te ja"	2010	2	NeBo
"Moje oči pune ljubavi"	2011	1	NeBo
"Dat će nam Bog"	2012	1	NeBo
"Neopisivo"	2013	1	Najdraži... Best of 2003–2013
"Čežnja"	2013	3	Najdraži... Best of 2003–2013
"Dan D"	2014	19	Dani i godine (Best of 2014–2021)
"Vjetrenjače"	2014	1	Dani i godine (Best of 2014–2021)
"Lozinka za raj" (with Željko Vasić)	2015	—	Single
"Više smo od prijatelja"	2015	1	Dani i godine (Best of 2014–2021)
"Cipele"	2015	2	Dani i godine (Best of 2014–2021)
"Dani i godine"	2016	1	Dani i godine (Best of 2014–2021)
"Vrati me"	2017	1	Dani i godine (Best of 2014–2021)
"Mijenja se vrijeme"	2017	1	Dani i godine (Best of 2014–2021)
"Na putu mom"	2017	7	Dani i godine (Best of 2014–2021)
"Rekao si"	2018	1	Dani i godine (Best of 2014–2021)
"Volim te, volim"	2019	1	Dani i godine (Best of 2014–2021)
"Ratujem s tugom"	2019	2	Dani i godine (Best of 2014–2021)
"Da biram"	2020	1	Dani i godine (Best of 2014–2021)
"Ja još uvijek imam istu želju"	2021	1	Dani i godine (Best of 2014–2021)
"Pamtim"	2021	3	Dani i godine (Best of 2014–2021)
"Bez tebe"	2022	8	Peristil sentimenti
"Nemoj" (with Petar Grašo)	2023	1	Moji ljudi
"#OnoKad"	2024	2	Moji ljudi
"Kako si"	2024	16	Moji ljudi
"Moji ljudi"	2024	1	Moji ljudi
"Alive"	2025	1	Moji ljudi
"Moj rodni grad"	2025	6	Moji ljudi
"Naš Božić" (with Zsa Zsa)	2025	—	Non-album single
"Nismo djeca"	2026	3	Moji ljudi
"—" denotes releases that did not chart or were not released in that territory.

=== English ===
Title	Year	Peak chart positions		Album
Title	Year	CRO	IT	Album
"I'm So Excited"	1998	1	4	Personality
"One & Only"	1999	—	18	Non-album single

== Tours ==
- NeBo Tour (2012–2013)
- Moji Ljudi Tour (2024–ongoing)

== See also ==
- List of contraltos in non-classical music
- Popular music in Croatia

== Notes ==
Achievements
Preceded by Daria Kinzer with "Celebrate"	Croatia in the Eurovision Song Contest; 2012	Succeeded by Klapa s Mora with "Mižerja"
