= Secrets (Regard and Raye song) =

2020 single by Regard and Raye

Single by Regard and Raye

from the album Euphoric Sad Songs
- Released: 24 April 2020
- Genre: Club; house; R&B
- Length: 2:56
- Label: Ministry of Sound
- Composers: Regard; Johan Lenox; John Hill; Jordan Asher Cruz; Stephen Feigenbaum
- Lyricists: Raye; Kennedi Lykken
- Producers: Regard; Johan Lenox; John Hill

Regard singles chronology
| "Ride It" (2019) | "Secrets" (2020) | "Say My Name" (2020) |

Raye singles chronology
| "Tequila" (2019) | "Secrets" (2020) | "Natalie Don't" (2020) |

Music video
- "Secrets" on YouTube

"Secrets" is a song by Kosovo-Albanian disc jockey Regard and British singer-songwriter Raye from the latter's debut mini-album, Euphoric Sad Songs (2020). The song was written by Regard, Raye, Johan Lenox, John Hill, Jordan Asher Cruz, Kennedi Lykken and Stephen Feigenbaum, and produced by Regard, Hill and Lenox. It was released as a single for digital download and streaming by Ministry of Sound on 24 April 2020. An English-language deep and retro-sounding club, house and R&B song, it touches on the theme of secrets and someone who has something to hide. Upon release, "Secrets" received critical acclaim from music critics, many of whom applauded the music, production and Raye's vocal delivery. At the 2021 Brit Awards, the song received a nomination in the category for the Song of the Year. The song entered the top 10, among others, in Bulgaria, Croatia, Ireland, Poland, Scotland and the United Kingdom, and received multiple gold certifications in various countries as well as platinum in Australia, France, Poland and the UK. An accompanying music video premiered on 19 June 2020, depicting the journey of masked motorcyclist, who is drawn to a mysterious location before being chased down by an unknown pursuer.

== Background and composition ==
"Secrets" was written by Regard, Raye, Johan Lenox, John Hill, Jordan Asher Cruz, Kennedi Lykken and Stephen Feigenbaum, and produced by Regard, Hill and Lenox. The song was released as a single for digital download and streaming by Ministry of Sound in various territories on 24 April 2020. Musically, it is an English-language deep and retro-sounding club, house and R&B song. Accompanied by a "catchy" and "calm" melody, it contains a refined production, consisting of a playful, catchy and quiet-described beat with a funky bass line. Lyrically, the song touches on the theme of secrets, as Raye sings about someone who has something to hide. Regarding their collaboration, Raye stated: "I'd written the top line [of 'Secrets'], to a completely different song, with the same lyrics and melody, and it was a lot slower [...] I sent it to [Regard], and he sped it up, gave it a whole new chord thing, put these instruments in, gave it this crazy drop. He like, reignited what was a slow R&B song and made it into some rejuvenated sexy, pop-dance banger." In a 2021 "#SongwriterSaturday" interview with Kim Taylor Bennett of Spotify, Raye mentioned that she had "so much respect" for Regard for allowing her to have a co-lead artist credit on "Secrets" after feeling overlooked as a featured artist on dance songs in the past.

== Reception ==
Upon release, "Secrets" was met with critical acclaim from music critics. For Songtexte.com, Ramona highlighted Raye's vocal delivery and the song's production, and continued writing that "[the song] will heat up the dance floor at home during Corona and the dance floor in the club after Corona, properly". While Anna Sky Hulton from Planet Radio labelled the song an "amazing dancefloor filler", Ale Mancinelli from EDM Lab wrote that "['Secrets'] keeps some similarities with the sounds of ['Ride It'], however, [it] maintains originality and appeal". Writing for Radio FG, Jean-Baptiste Blandin viewed the song as a "powerful track [...] which has everything to become the new hit of the summer". Commercially, "Secrets" reached the top 10 in the Commonwealth of Independent States (CIS), Croatia, Czech Republic, Ireland, Poland, Scotland and the United Kingdom, and also entered the top 50 in Australia, Belgium, Canada, Denmark, Hungary, the Netherlands and Slovakia. It further reached number eight on the Billboard US Dance/Electronic Songs chart. The song attained gold certifications in Austria, Belgium, France and Mexico as well as platinum in Australia, Poland and the UK. The song also appeared on several best songs of 2020 year-end lists, including ones published by Amazon Music and Tidal. In 2021, "Secrets" received a nomination in the category for the Song of the Year at the Brit Awards.

== Promotion ==
Preceded by the release of a lyric video on 23 April 2020, a music video for "Secrets" was directed by Harry Lindley and uploaded to Regard's YouTube channel on 19 June. A computer-generated imagery (CGI) video, it tells the story of a masked motorcyclist who is drawn to a mysterious location, before being chased down by an unknown pursuer. The video also features remote appearances from Regard driving through the late-night streets on a motorbike and Raye performing the song on several television screens. Rob Ulitski from Promo News commended the video as "slick" and "futuristic" in its style and wrote that "[it] leans into more conceptual territory, and delivers a high-energy, quickfire succession of striking set pieces". Writing for Celeb Mix, Katrina Rees complimented the video as "epic", which according to her "is perfectly suited to the club-ready [song], and [...] will no doubt help it continue [its] growing success over the coming weeks and months".

== Track listings ==
- Digital download and streaming
1. "Secrets" – 2:56
- Digital download and streaming
1. "Secrets" (MOTi Remix) – 2:35
2. "Secrets" (HUGEL Remix) – 3:16
3. "Secrets" (Tom Field Remix) – 2:37
4. "Secrets" (Consoul Trainin Remix) – 2:39

== Charts ==
=== Weekly charts ===
Weekly chart performance for "Secrets"
| Chart (2020) | Peak position |
|---|---|
| Australia (ARIA) | 24 |
| Australian Dance (ARIA) | 3 |
| Belgium (Ultratop 50 Flanders) | 17 |
| Belgium (Ultratop 50 Wallonia) | 13 |
| Bulgaria (PROPHON) | 1 |
| Canada CHR/Top 40 (Billboard) | 49 |
| CIS Airplay (TopHit) | 3 |
| Croatia (HRT) | 8 |
| Czech Republic Singles Digital (ČNS IFPI) | 59 |
| Czech Republic Airplay (ČNS IFPI) | 6 |
| Denmark (Tracklisten) | 20 |
| France (SNEP) | 68 |
| Germany (GfK) | 84 |
| Global 200 (Billboard) | 122 |
| Greece (IFPI) | 39 |
| Hungary (Dance Top 40) | 26 |
| Hungary (Rádiós Top 40) | 11 |
| Hungary (Single Top 40) | 36 |
| Ireland (IRMA) | 7 |
| Lithuania (AGATA) | 13 |
| Mexico Airplay (Billboard) | 21 |
| Netherlands (Dutch Top 40) | 11 |
| Netherlands (Single Top 100) | 17 |
| Poland Airplay (ZPAV) | 3 |
| Portugal (AFP) | 136 |
| Romania (Airplay 100) | 11 |
| Russia Airplay (TopHit) | 4 |
| Scotland Singles (Official Charts) | 8 |
| Slovakia Airplay (ČNS IFPI) | 22 |
| Slovakia Singles Digital (ČNS IFPI) | 35 |
| Sweden (Sverigetopplistan) | 60 |
| Switzerland (Schweizer Hitparade) | 85 |
| UK Singles (Official Charts) | 6 |
| UK Dance (Official Charts) | 1 |
| US Hot Dance/Electronic Songs (Billboard) | 8 |
| US Pop Airplay (Billboard) | 39 |
| Venezuela (Record Report) | 85 |

=== Monthly charts ===
Monthly chart performance for "Secrets"
| Chart (2020) | Peak position |
|---|---|
| CIS (TopHit) | 6 |
| Latvia (LAIPA) | 6 |
| Russia Airplay (TopHit) | 7 |

=== Year-end charts ===
2020 year-end chart performance for "Secrets"
| Chart (2020) | Peak position |
|---|---|
| Australia (ARIA) | 87 |
| Australian Dance (ARIA) | 12 |
| Belgium (Ultratop Flanders) | 65 |
| Belgium Dance (Ultratop Flanders) | 4 |
| Belgium (Ultratop Wallonia) | 73 |
| Belgium Dance (Ultratop Wallonia) | 13 |
| CIS (TopHit) | 39 |
| Croatia (HRT) | 32 |
| Hungary (Dance Top 40) | 90 |
| Hungary (Rádiós Top 40) | 65 |
| Ireland (IRMA) | 38 |
| Netherlands (Dutch Top 40) | 51 |
| Netherlands (Single Top 100) | 75 |
| Poland (Polish Airplay Top 100) | 43 |
| Romania (Airplay 100) | 63 |
| Russia Airplay (TopHit) | 42 |
| UK Singles (OCC) | 41 |
| US Hot Dance/Electronic Songs (Billboard) | 19 |

2021 year-end chart performance for "Secrets"
| Chart (2021) | Peak position |
|---|---|
| Australian Dance (ARIA) | 30 |
| CIS (TopHit) | 185 |
| Croatia (HRT) | 71 |

== Certifications ==
Certifications and sales for "Secrets"
| Region | Certification | Certified units/sales |
|---|---|---|
| Australia (ARIA) | Platinum | 70,000^{‡} |
| Austria (IFPI Austria) | Gold | 15,000^{‡} |
| Belgium (BRMA) | Gold | 20,000^{‡} |
| Canada (Music Canada) | Platinum | 80,000^{‡} |
| Denmark (IFPI Danmark) | Platinum | 90,000^{‡} |
| France (SNEP) | Platinum | 200,000^{‡} |
| Germany (BVMI) | Gold | 200,000^{‡} |
| Italy (FIMI) | Gold | 35,000^{‡} |
| Mexico (AMPROFON) | Gold | 30,000^{‡} |
| New Zealand (RMNZ) | Platinum | 30,000^{‡} |
| Poland (ZPAV) | Platinum | 20,000^{‡} |
| Spain (Promusicae) | Gold | 30,000^{‡} |
| United Kingdom (BPI) | Platinum | 600,000^{‡} |
^{‡} Sales+streaming figures based on certification alone.

== Release history ==
Release dates and formats for "Secrets"
| Region | Date | Format(s) | Label | Ref. |
|---|---|---|---|---|
| Various | 24 April 2020 | Digital download; streaming | Ministry of Sound | |
| Italy | 1 May 2020 | Radio airplay | Sony | |

== See also ==
- List of UK Dance Singles Chart number ones of 2020
