= AppFlood =

- Founded: 2012
- Headquarters: Beijing
- Website: appflood.com

AppFlood is a programmatic mobile advertising platform created by PapayaMobile. It was launched in 2012, and in 2014 became the first mobile real-time bidding platform to be engineered and made available in China.

== History ==
AppFlood was launched in July 2012 by PapayaMobile, a mobile technology company previously known for its social gaming network. The business is headquartered in Beijing and has offices in San Francisco and London.

By AppFlood's one-year anniversary, it had attracted 4,500 Android users and was delivering 1.3 billion impressions. In April 2014, AppFlood launched a real-time bidding platform, the first to be engineered and made available in China.

The company had a stated goal being the leading company bridging China and western countries. By August 2014 AppFlood had sent ads to 400 million mobile devices globally.
