= Godine nestvarne =

Studio album by Nina Badrić
- Released: 1995
- Genre: Pop, Dance
- Length: 68:58
- Label: Croatia Records

Nina Badrić chronology
Godine nestvarne (1995)	Personality (1997)

Godine nestvarne is the first studio album by Croatian recording artist Nina Badrić, released in 1995 by Croatia Records.

== Track listing ==
No.	Title	Length
1.	"Godine nestvarne"	6:13
2.	"Još uvijek sam tu"	5:41
3.	"Meni bi htio"	5:25
4.	"Jumpin' Down"	5:35
5.	"Take Me Higher"	5:13
6.	"Istina"	5:49
7.	"I ponekad kada"	6:13
8.	"Heard That Sound"	5:24
9.	"Samo tvoja sam bila"	5:34
10.	"Da li ikada"	5:50
11.	"Odlaziš zauvijek"	4:48
12.	"Istina"	3:11
13.	"Godine nestvarne"	6:37
Total length:		68:58
