= Nina (Nina Badrić album) =

Studio album by Nina Badrić
- Released: 2000
- Genre: Pop
- Length: 47:54
- Label: Croatia Records

Nina Badrić chronology
Unique (1999)	Nina (2000)	Ljubav (2003)

Nina is the fourth studio album by Croatian recording artist Nina Badrić, released in 2000 by Croatia Records.

== Track listing ==
No.	Title	Length
1.	"Ako kažeš da me ne voliš"	4:23
2.	"Ostavljam ti sve"	4:28
3.	"Sva tebi pripadam"	3:56
4.	"Nek ti bude kao meni"	3:38
5.	"Slobodna"	3:43
6.	"Vječita ljubav"	4:06
7.	"Igraj se"	3:36
8.	"Budi mi blizu"	3:31
9.	"Zbog tebe živim"	4:42
10.	"Lately I'm missing you"	4:34
11.	"Ostavljam ti sve (Remix)"	4:11
12.	"Ako kažeš da me ne voliš (Remix)"	5:06
