= Croatia in the Eurovision Song Contest 2012 =

- Eurovision Song Contest 2012
- Country: Croatia
- Selection process: Internal selection
- Announcement date: Artist: 10 January 2012; Song: 18 February 2012

Competing entry
- Song: "Nebo"
- Artist: Nina Badrić
- Songwriters: Nina Badrić

Placement
- Semi-final result: Failed to qualify (12th)

Participation chronology

Croatia was represented at the Eurovision Song Contest 2012 with the song "Nebo" written and performed by Nina Badrić, who was selected internally by the Croatian broadcaster Croatian Radiotelevision (HRT) on 10 January 2012 to represent Croatia at the 2012 contest in Baku, Azerbaijan. Her song Nebo" was presented to the public on 18 February 2012 during the special programme Dora 2012 - Idemo na Eurosong s Ninom!.

Croatia was drawn to compete in the second semi-final of the Eurovision Song Contest which took place on 24 May 2012. Performing during the show in position 10, "Nebo" was not announced among the top 10 entries of the second semi-final and therefore did not qualify to compete in the final. It was later revealed that Croatia placed twelfth out of the 18 participating countries in the semi-final with 42 points.

== Background ==
Prior to the 2012 contest, Croatia had participated in the Eurovision Song Contest nineteen times since its first entry in 1993. The nation's best result in the contest was fourth, which it achieved on two occasions: in 1996 with the song "Sveta ljubav" performed by Maja Blagdan and in 1999 with the song "Marija Magdalena" performed by Doris Dragović. Following the introduction of semi-finals for the 2004, Croatia had thus far featured in five finals. In 2010 and 2011, the Croatian entries failed to qualify from the semi-finals; the last time Croatia competed in the final was in 2009 with the song "Lijepa Tena" performed by Igor Cukrov featuring Andrea. In 2011, Croatia failed to qualify to the final with Daria and the song "Celebrate".

The Croatian national broadcaster, Croatian Radiotelevision (HRT), broadcasts the event within Croatia and organises the selection process for the nation's entry. HRT confirmed Croatia's participation in the 2012 Eurovision Song Contest on 22 November 2011. Since 1993, HRT organised the national final Dora in order to select the Croatian entry for the Eurovision Song Contest. For their 2012 participation, Dora was planned to be continued featuring invited artists having the opportunity to choose their composers for their entries. However, such plans were later cancelled due to low interest with the Croatian broadcaster opting to internally select the entry.

== Before Eurovision ==
=== Internal selection ===
On 10 January 2012, the Croatian national broadcaster HRT announced that it had internally selected Nina Badrić to represent Croatia at the Eurovision Song Contest 2012. Nina Badrić previously attempted to represent Croatia at the Eurovision Song Contest on several occasions: in 1993 with "Ostavljam te" placing seventh, in 1994 with "Godine nestvarne" placing tenth, in 1995 with "Odlaziš zauvijek" placing seventeenth, and in 2003 with "Čarobno jutro" placing second. In regards to her selection as the Croatian entrant, Badrić stated: "For me, this is both an honour and a challenge, and I think the most important thing is to be yourself and have a quality song. I am looking forward to all this and may God serve us this year with a little luck."

The song that Badrić performed at the Eurovision Song Contest, "Nebo", was presented on 18 February 2012 during a special programme titled Dora 2012 - Idemo na Eurosong s Ninom!. The presentation show took place at the Anton Marti Studio in Zagreb and was broadcast on HRT 1 as well as online via the broadcaster's website hrt.hr and the official Eurovision Song Contest website eurovision.tv. Member of Yugoslav Eurovision Song Contest 1989 winner Riva Emilija Kokić, 2006 Bosnian Eurovision entrant Hari Mata Hari, 2011 Serbian Eurovision entrant Nina, 2012 Bosnian Eurovision entrant Maya Sar, 2012 Macedonia Eurovision entrant Kaliopi and 2012 Montenegrin Eurovision entrant Rambo Amadeus performed as guests during the show. "Nebo" was written by Nina Badrić herself and produced by Ante Gelo. The song was also featured in Badrić's recent album NeBo, but was shortened for the Eurovision Song Contest as the original version exceeded three minutes.

=== Preparation ===
Following the presentation show, "Nebo" was released by Aquarius Records on iTunes and Amazon on 22 February. Badrić also went through vocal cord surgery in late February, which she managed to recover from before the contest.

== At Eurovision ==
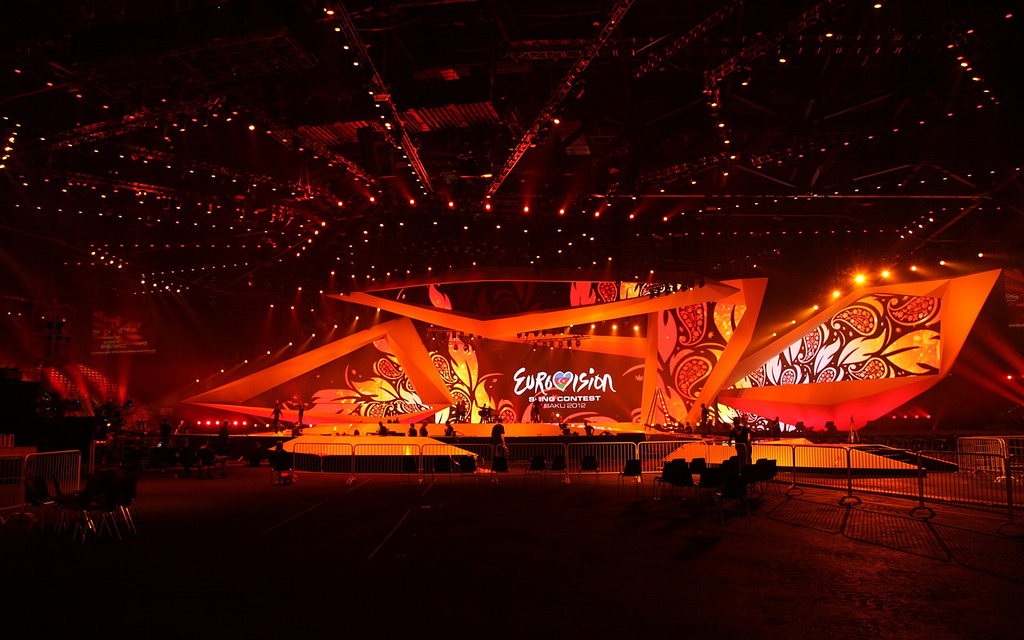
The Eurovision Song Contest 2012 took place at the Baku Crystal Hall in Baku, Azerbaijan

According to Eurovision rules, all nations with the exceptions of the host country and the "Big Five" (France, Germany, Italy, Spain and the United Kingdom) are required to qualify from one of two semi-finals in order to compete for the final; the top ten countries from each semi-final progress to the final. The European Broadcasting Union (EBU) split up the competing countries into six different pots based on voting patterns from previous contests, with countries with favourable voting histories put into the same pot. On 25 January 2012, a special allocation draw was held which placed each country into one of the two semi-finals, as well as which half of the show they would perform in. Croatia was placed into the second semi-final, to be held on 24 May 2012, and was scheduled to perform in the second half of the show. The running order for the semi-finals was decided through another draw on 20 March 2012 and Croatia was set to perform in position 10, following the entry from Slovenia and before the entry from Sweden.

The two semi-finals and the final were broadcast in Croatia on HRT 1 with commentary by Duško Ćurlić. The Croatian spokesperson, who announced the Croatian votes during the final, was Nevena Rendeli.

=== Semi-final ===
Nina Badrić took part in technical rehearsals on 16 and 19 May, followed by dress rehearsals on 23 and 24 May. This included the jury final where professional juries of each country watched and voted on the competing entries.

The Croatian performance featured Nina Badrić in a long black dress, joined on stage by three backing vocalists dressed in white and two dancers dressed in black. The stage lighting was in blue and white with the LED screens transitioned from a mountain scenery next to a seaside to grey clouds. Towards the climax of the song, the dancers lifted a long white cloth and positioned it behind the other performers with the use of a wind machine. The three backing vocalists that joined Badrić were: Danijela Večerinović Ivana Cabraja and Jelena Majić, while the two dancers were Dinko Zec and Igor Barberić who was also the choreographer of the Croatian performance.

At the end of the show, Croatia was not announced among the top 10 entries in the second semi-final and therefore failed to qualify to compete in the final. It was later revealed that Croatia placed twelfth in the semi-final, receiving a total of 42 points.

=== Voting ===
Voting during the three shows consisted of 50 percent public televoting and 50 percent from a jury deliberation. The jury consisted of five music industry professionals who were citizens of the country they represent. This jury was asked to judge each contestant based on: vocal capacity; the stage performance; the song's composition and originality; and the overall impression by the act. In addition, no member of a national jury could be related in any way to any of the competing acts in such a way that they cannot vote impartially and independently.

Following the release of the full split voting by the EBU after the conclusion of the competition, it was revealed that Croatia had placed fourteenth with the public televote and seventh with the jury vote in the second semi-final. In the public vote, Croatia scored 34 points, while with the jury vote, Croatia scored 66 points.

Below is a breakdown of points awarded to Croatia and awarded by Croatia in the second semi-final and grand final of the contest. The nation awarded its 12 points to Bosnia and Herzegovina in the semi-final and to Serbia in the final of the contest.

==== Points awarded to Croatia ====
Points awarded to Croatia (Semi-final 2)
Score	Country
12 points	Bosnia and Herzegovina; Serbia
10 points	
8 points	Slovenia
7 points	Macedonia
6 points	
5 points	
4 points	
3 points	
2 points	
1 point	Belarus; Germany; Ukraine

==== Points awarded by Croatia ====
Points awarded by Croatia (Semi-final 2)
Score	Country
12 points	Bosnia and Herzegovina
10 points	Serbia
8 points	Slovenia
7 points	Macedonia
6 points	Sweden
5 points	Malta
4 points	Lithuania
3 points	Portugal
2 points	Belarus
1 point	Ukraine

Points awarded by Croatia (Final)
Score	Country
12 points	Serbia
10 points	Bosnia and Herzegovina
8 points	Macedonia
7 points	Sweden
6 points	Russia
5 points	Albania
4 points	Germany
3 points	Ireland
2 points	Italy
1 point	Moldova
