= 07 (album) =

Studio album by Nina Badrić
- Released: 2007
- Genre: Pop
- Length: 50:50
- Label: Aquarius Records

Nina Badrić chronology
Ljubav (2003)	07 (2007)	NeBo (2011)

07 is the sixth studio album by Croatian recording artist Nina Badrić, released in 2007 by Aquarius Records.

== Track listing ==
No.	Title	Length
1.	"Kralj života mog"	4:24
2.	"Osjećaj"	3:57
3.	"Nek voda nosi ljubav"	3:52
4.	"Vlak"	5:26
5.	"Da se opet tebi vratim"	4:14
6.	"Ne dam te nikom"	4:09
7.	"Moje ludilo"	3:38
8.	"Dodiri od stakla"	3:22
9.	"Sila prirode"	3:57
10.	"Iz inata"	3:45
11.	"Imati pa nemati"	4:01
12.	"Ne dam te nikom"	5:05
