= Oblivion (Kaliopi album) =

Studio album by Kaliopi & Edin Karamazov
- Released: Macedonia Serbia; November 2009
- Recorded: "Morris" Studio, Zagreb, Croatia
- Genre: Classical, Folk, World, & Country
- Length: 47:35
- Label: Kaliopi Music Production
- Producer: Edin Karamazov

Kaliopi chronology
'Zelim Ti Reci' (2008)	Oblivion (2009)	Poraka (2010)

Singles from Oblivion
- 1. "Oblivion" Released: 2009

Oblivion is the first duet album by the Macedonian singer Kaliopi with Bosnian lutenist Edin Karamazov, recorded and released in 2009.

== Background ==
In 2009, Kaliopi officially announced that her Oblivion will be a joint collaboration working with Edin Karamazov.

== Production history ==
The album was recorded in Croatia and released in Macedonia and Serbia. It contains 11 songs. The album cover was designed by Dejan Milićević. Full arrangement and producing by Edin Karamazov. It was released in November 2009.

== Track listing ==
1. "Melodia Sentimental" (3:56)
  Credits: Composed By – Heitor Villa-Lobos-Lyrics By – Dora Vasconcelos
2. "A Boy Named Hiroshima" (4:19)
  Credits: Composed By – Toru Takemitsu
3. "Oblivion" (3:24)
  Credits: Written-By – Astor Piazzolla
4. "Wachet Auf, Ruft Uns Die Stimme" (3:26)
  Credits: Composed By – J. S. Bach*
5. "Cinema Paradiso (Tema D'Amore)" (3:30)
  Credits: Written-By – Andrea Morricone
6. "Hallelujah" (5:11)
  Credits: Written-By – Leonard Cohen
7. "Ja Vstretil Vas (Я Встретил Вас)" (4:57)
  Credits: Lyrics By – Тючев Ф.-Music By – Trad. / Неизв.*
8. "Amarilli Mia Bella" (2:44)
  Credits: Composed By – Giulio Caccini
9. "Alfonsina y el mar" (3:39)
  music:Composed By – Ariel Ramirez-Lyrics By – Felix Luna*
10. "Koyunbaba" (7:48)
  Credits: Written-By – Carlo Domeniconi
11. "So Maki Sum Se Rodila (Со Маки Сум Се Родила)" (4:27)
  Credits: Written-By – Trad. / Makedonska Tradicionalna*
