= Cipele =

Single by Nina Badrić

from the album Dani i godine (Best of 2014–2021)
- Released: 22 October 2015
- Genre: Pop
- Length: 4:07
- Label: Aquarius
- Composers: Nina Badrić; Alen Hržica
- Lyricist: Nina Badrić
- Producer: Predrag "P'Eggy" Martinjak

Nina Badrić singles chronology
"Više smo od prijatelja" (2015)	"Cipele" (2015)	"Dani i godine" (2016)

"Cipele" (Croatian for 'Shoes') is a song recorded by Croatian pop recording artist Nina Badrić. It was released as a single on 21 October 2015 through Aquarius Records. The song was written by Nina Badrić and Alan Hržica. It was produced and recorded in Zagreb.

== Weekly charts ==
Chart (2016)	Peak position
Croatia	1
