= Nebo, Virginia =

- Unincorporated community
- Location within Virginia Location within the United States
- Coordinates: 36°56′30″N 81°26′30″W
- Country: United States
- State: Virginia
- County: Smyth
- Elevation: 2,277 ft (694 m)
- Time zone: UTC-5 (Eastern (EST))
  - Summer (DST): UTC-4 (EDT)
- GNIS feature ID: 1497037

Nebo is an unincorporated community in Smyth County, Virginia, United States.
