= D'Knock =

- Born: Darko Juranović
- Origin: Zagreb, Croatia
- Genres: R&B, hip hop, house
- Occupation: record producer
- Years active: 1989–present
- Labels: D'Knock Production Urbani Zvuk
- Website: dknock.com, www.playone.eu

Darko Juranović, better known by his stage name D'Knock, is a Croatian record producer, songwriter and artist, as well as a promoter of the Croatian club and hip-hop scene. He is also one of the founding members of the production team PlayOne, a member of the music duo D'Knock & Jay, the owner of D'Knock Production record label, as well as a co-CEO and co-founder of the production company Urbani Zvuk and video production company JMJ Factory.

Under his former stage name Da’Real, from 1987 he performed as one of the original members of the band 'ET (Electro Team), which he left in 1998 to focus on his career as a music producer. He has written and produced many award-winning hits and albums, several of which have been awarded Porin music awards. In 2004, he won the Porin award for the producer of the year and for the best album.

His Croatian collaborations include Nina Badrić, Tony Cetinski, Dino Dvornik, Ilan Kabiljo, Divas, Vanna, Cubismo and Bolesna Braća, while on the international scene he has worked with Simple Minds, Simply Red, Barbara Tucker, Andy Wright, Mick Hucknall (Simply Red), Peter Grant, DJ Spen (Quantize Recordings), Stamen, Eddie Amador, Dany Cohiba, Amrick Channa, among others. He has also collaborated on various projects with the marketing agency Unex Group, and even coined a wide range of jingles for well-known Croatian and international brands.

== History ==
=== Collaborations ===
In 2004, D'Knock won the Porin music award as a master producer for the album “Ljubav“ by Nina Badrić, which won 5 Porin awards in total. He also produced the album “Divas“ for the music group Divas that was nominated for Porin awards in 5 categories in 2000.

As a member of the production duo PlayOne, he has worked with the Papaya Club Zrće on the Papaya Day&Night Festival Project since 2005, which involves producing the Papaya Day&Night music compilations including one of the club’s theme songs - “I Found a Place” featuring Barbara Tucker.

In 2010, D'Knock joined Tihomir Preradović (Slow Mo'T) and DJ Kosta Radman, to remix Olivia Newton-John’s “Physical”. This new version, performed by the Croatian singer Iness, was subsequently included on Sony Music's “Club Sounds Vol. 52“ (CD 1, track 15) alongside artists such as Shakira, Leona Lewis, Britney Spears, Fatboy Slim and Fragma.

In spring 2010, together with Slow Mo’T, he produced two songs composed by Macedonian singer Toše Proeski, which featured on Proeski’s compilation “Još uvijek sanjam da smo zajedno” - “Zauvijek” (lyrics by Snježana Popović, performed by Kaliopi), and “Kasno je za sve” (lyrics by Miroslav Rus, performed by Aki Rahimovski). Later that year, in fall 2010, he worked on the album “Poruka” for Kaliopi, for which he is credited as supervisor, chief music producer and co-writer of the majority of the songs.

At the beginning of 2016, PlayOne and producer Zvonimir Dusper Dus made a new edit of the song "Hipnotiziran" for the Croatian singer Dino Dvornik, also known as "the Croatian king of funk".

In 2017, D'Knock and his wife Jelena Juranović founded their music duo D'Knock & Jay, and so far they have released 4 singles: Jedan dan, Ljubav najbolje zna, Samo ti and Stvorena za ljubav.

=== International career ===
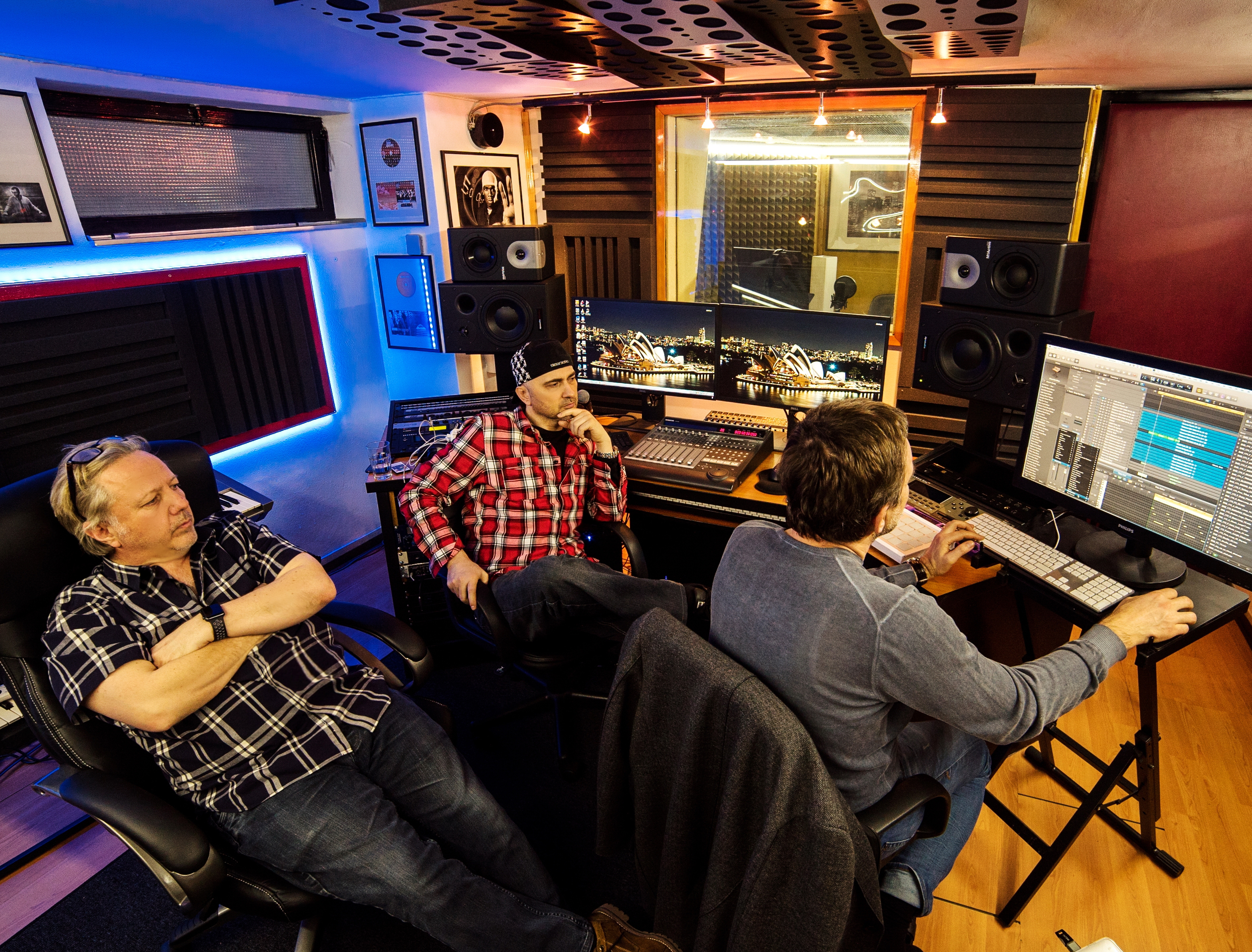
PlayOne & Andy Wright in the studio, February 2017

In 2008, PlayOne remixed Barbara Tucker's hit single “Feeling Like A Superstar” for her 2008 album, and produced the subsequent hit, “Let Your Love Shine Through”.

At the end of 2011, D`Knock & DJ Fresh Jay, together with Zvonimir Dusper Dus, started to produce for UK Grammy Award-winning music producer Andy Wright. This collaboration, which was supported by the Oziris Agency and Svijet Produkcije, started on the remix of a single "Take It to the Roof", of the British performer Peter Grant, and then continued with remixing a solo single of the Simply Red frontman Mick Hucknall "Happy This Christmas".

In 2012, PlayOne rejoined Barbara Tucker to work with DJ Q Boogie on the “PlayOne feat. Barb&Q Project”, which saw a return to their musical roots and original soulful house, hip-hop and funk sound. PlayOne’s involvement in this project was borne out of Tucker's friendship with some of the biggest house and funk legends in New York.

In 2013, DJ Fresh Jay moved to Las Vegas to open a branch of the Liveinthemix music label, aiming to expand its musical presence in the US market.

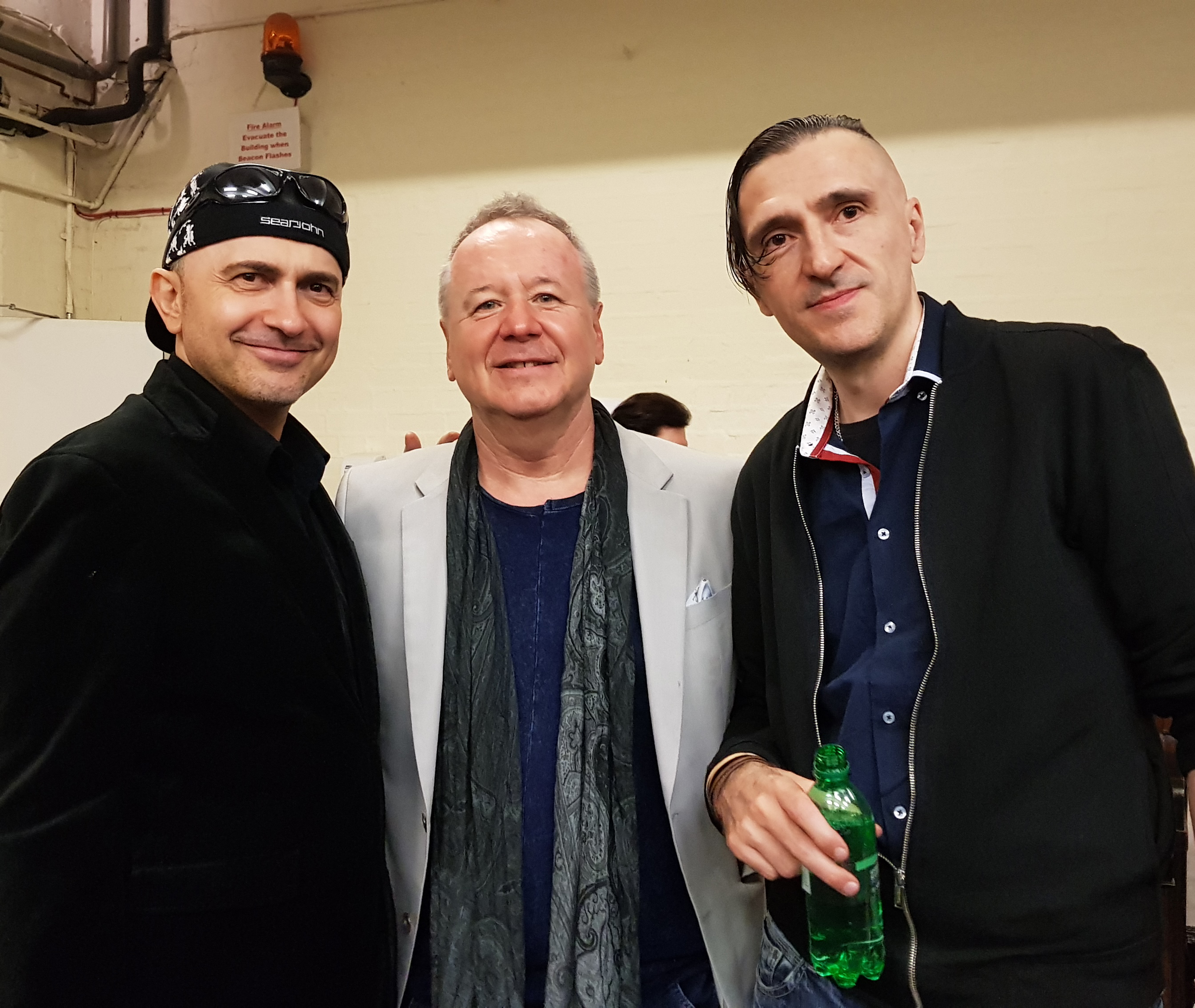
PlayOne with Jim Kerr (Simple Minds) in London, June 2017

In summer 2013, PlayOne joined forces with long-term collaborator Sandra Berković to release the single “Can I Get Some Love”, featuring vocals from UK house singer Amrick Channa.

At the end of 2013, together with Zvonimir Dusper, PlayOne established a collaboration on the global humanitarian project for the homeless "We Can Heal". Barbara Tucker, one of the initiators of the project, gathered a large number of the world's top vocalists and remixers, including PlayOne, to produce the single "We Can Heal" (composed by Barbara Tucker & Marcus Fugate, lyrics by Barbara Tucker). Its first edition includes versions by PlayOne, Frankie Knuckles & Eric Kupper, DJ Spen & Gary Hudgins and Rhemi.

At the beginning of 2015, PlayOne launched their single "This Is The Night" feat. Amrick Channa and Jelena Majić (JM).

In summer 2015, the Simply Red's music producer Andy Wright engaged PlayOne and Zvonimir Dusper to remix the Simply Red's single "The Ghost Of Love" from their latest album 'Big Love'. The executive producer of this remix is Petra Crnetić (Oziris Agency) for Svijet Produkcije.

After that, in 2016, PlayOne and Andy started working on new versions of 12 greatest hits of the band Simple Minds, on the occasion of the 40th anniversary of Simple Minds' career.

In 2017 and 2018, along with DJ Fresh Jay and Zvonimir Dusper Dus, D`Knock has been working on the couple of projects with British music producer Andy Wright, known for his collaboration with international artists, such as Simple Minds, Eurythmics, Annie Lennox, Natalie Imbruglia, Luciano Pavarotti, Simply Red, Jeff Beck and many others. Some of the mutual projects include music production for the studio album of British singer and actor Ryan Molloy.

== Discography ==
=== Studio albums ===
- 2010 - Album Kaliopi: “Poruka“

(album producer: D'Knock, co-producer: Slow Mo'T)

- 2009 - Album Sandra Berković: “Upali Radio“

(album producer: D'Knock, co-producer: Slow Mo'T)

- 2003 - Album Tony Cetinski: “A sada...“

(album producer: Miro Buljan, co-producer: D'Knock)

- 2003 - Album Nina Badrić: “Ljubav“

(album producer: D'Knock)

- 2002 - Album Divas: “Bon Appetit“

(album producer: D'Knock)

- 2000 - Album Nina Badrić: “Nina“

(album producer: D'Knock)

- 2000 - Album Bolesna Braća: “Lovci Na Šubare“

(music producer on tracks "Blowin' Up Your Sector" and "U Must Know (About ZG)": D'Knock)

- 1999 - Album Divas: “Divas“

(album producer: D'Knock)

- 1999 - Album Tram 11: “Čovječe Ne Ljuti Se“

(album mastering: D'Knock, Dash, Dragutin Smokrović "Smokva")

- 1998 - Album Vanna: “Ispod istog neba“

(album producer: Miro Buljan, co-producer: D'Knock)

- 1996 - Album ET: “Anno Domini 1996“

(album production: "Music Temple Production" (Boytronic, Miro Buljan, Da'Real))

- 1994 - Album ET: “Second To None“

(album production: "Music Temple Production" (Boytronic, Miro Buljan, Da'Real))

- 1992 - Album ET: “Electro Team“

(album production: "Music Temple Production" (Boytronic, Miro Buljan, Da'Real))

=== Compilation albums ===
- 2015 - Compilation This Is The Night (Remixes)

(Composed and lyrics by: D`Knock, DJ Fresh Jay, Jelena Majić / Remixes: Reform Remix / Daniel Troha Remix / DJ Whistler Remix / Axetone Remix)

- 2012 - Compilation Green Gold Music

(composed, produced, arranged & mixed by: Fresh Jay & Darko Juranović D’Knock)

- 2010 - Compilation Papaya Day&Night 2010

(music producers on track Tony Cetinski - "Reason To Fly": D'Knock & Kosta Radman; on track Dino Dvornik - "Africa 2010": DJ Fresh Jay & D'Knock)

- 2009 - Compilation Papaya Day&Night 2009

(album producers: DJ Fresh Jay & D'Knock)

- 2008 - Compilation Papaya Day&Night Vol. 4

(album producers: DJ Fresh Jay & D'Knock)

- 2007 - Compilation Papaya Day&Night Vol. 3

(album producers: DJ Fresh Jay & D'Knock)

- 2006 - Compilation Papaya Day&Night Vol. 2

(album producers: DJ Fresh Jay & D'Knock)

- 2005 - Compilation Papaya Day&Night Vol. 1

(album producers: DJ Fresh Jay & D'Knock)

- 2003 - Compilation Urbani Zvuk presents Silver Blue

(album producers: DJ Fresh Jay & D'Knock)

- 2002 - Compilation Urbani Zvuk - Sunrise Hit Edition

(album producers: DJ Fresh Jay & D'Knock)

=== Singles ===
- 2023 - Single D'Knock & Jay: "Stvorena za ljubav" (Radio Edit)
- 2022 - Single D'Knock & Jay: "Samo ti" (Radio Edit & Remixes)
- 2018 - Single D'Knock & Jay: "Ljubav najbolje zna" (Radio Edit)
- 2017 - Single D'Knock & Jay: "Jedan dan" (Acoustic)
- 2017 - Single D'Knock & Jay: "Jedan dan" (Radio Edit)
- 2016 - Single PlayOne & Dino Dvornik: "Hipnotiziran" (PlayOne Radio Edit)
- 2015 - Single Simply Red: “The Ghost of Love“ (PlayOne Remix)
- 2015 - Single PlayOne "This Is The Night" feat. Amrick Channa & JM
- 2014 - Single PlayOne & Barb & Q present "We Are Not Alone"
- 2013 - Single “We Can Heal“, House For The Homeless (first edition includes versions by PlayOne, Frankie Knuckles & Eric Kupper, DJ Spen & Gary Hudgins and Rhemi)
- 2013 - Single PlayOne feat. Amrick Channa & Sandra: “Can I Get Some Love“
- 2012 - Single Peter Grant: “Take It To The Roof“ (PlayOne Remix)
- 2012 - Single PlayOne feat. Barbara Tucker: “Let It Shine“ (Ibiza Dub Edit 2012)
- 2011 - Single Mick Hucknall: “Happy This Christmas“ (PlayOne Edit)
- 2010 - Single Barbara Tucker: “Feelin' Like A Superstar“
- 2008 - Single PlayOne feat. Barbara Tucker: “Let Your Love Shine Through“
- 2008 - Single PlayOne feat. Barbara Tucker: “I Found A Place“
- 1999 - Single Ilan Kabiljo & D'Knock feat. Baby Dooks: “Tvoje Tijelo“
