= Nebo, Ohio =

Coordinates: 41°16′01″N 84°40′09″W

Nebo is a ghost town in Defiance County, in the U.S. state of Ohio. It was located south of Mark Center.

== History ==
Nebo was founded by Civil War veteran George Spealman who operated a general store and ran the post office. The town also had a saw mill, cider mill, and a school. The post office was established in 1890 and remained in operation until 1904.
