= Love Me Again (Raye song) =

Single by Raye

from the album Euphoric Sad Songs
- Released: 2 August 2019
- Length: 3:18
- Label: Polydor
- Songwriters: Janée Bennett; Rachel Keen
- Producer: Fred Ball

Raye singles chronology
"Stay (Don't Go Away)" (2019)	"Love Me Again" (2019)	"Make It to Heaven" (2019)

Music videos
- "Love Me Again" on YouTube; "Love Me Again" (remix) on YouTube

"Love Me Again" is a song by British singer-songwriter Raye, released as the lead single from her debut mini-album, Euphoric Sad Songs on 2 August 2019. The song was written by Janée Bennett and Raye, and produced by Fred Ball. A remix with British singer-songwriter Jess Glynne was released on 30 August 2019.

== Track listing ==
Digital download
No.	Title	Length
1.	"Love Me Again"	3:18

Digital download
No.	Title	Length
1.	"Love Me Again" (with Jess Glynne) (Remix)	3:09

Digital download
No.	Title	Length
1.	"Love Me Again" (with Jess Glynne) (Redfield Remix)	3:18

Digital download
No.	Title	Length
1.	"Love Me Again" (with Guiltybeatz) (RAYEMIX)	2:48

Digital download
No.	Title	Length
1.	"Love Me Again" (with Jess Glynne) (Zac Samuels Remix)	2:43

== Charts ==
Chart (2019)	Peak position
Ireland (IRMA)	34
Scottish Singles Sales (Official Charts)	38
UK Singles (Official Charts)	55

== Certifications ==
Certifications
Region	Certification	Certified units/sales
United Kingdom (BPI)	Gold	400,000^{‡}
^{‡} Sales+streaming figures based on certification alone.

== Release history ==
Version	Date	Format	Label
Original	2 August 2019	Digital download, streaming	Polydor Records
Remix with Jess Glynne	30 August 2019	Digital download, streaming	Polydor Records
Redfield Remix with Jess Glynne	18 October 2019	Digital download, streaming	Polydor Records
RAYEMIX with Guiltybeatz	6 November 2019	Digital download, streaming	Polydor Records
Zac Samuels Remix with Jess Glynne	8 November 2019	Digital download, streaming	Polydor Records
