= PapayaMobile =

Chinese app company

PapayaMobile, Inc.
- Native name: 木瓜移动
- Founded: 2008
- Founder: 沈思
- Headquarters: Beijing
- Website: Official website

PapayaMobile (木瓜移動) also known as Papaya, is a mobile technology company responsible for three mobile products: AppFlood, a programmatic mobile advertising platform, Papaya Games, a mobile games development studio, and Kiwi Calendar, a calendar app for mobile and web users. Papaya is based in Beijing with offices in San Francisco, London and Tel Aviv.

== History ==
PapayaMobile was founded in 2008 by CEO Si Shen and CTO Wenjie Qian. Its first globally successful game was Papaya Farm for iOS and Android. After producing several more titles, Papaya chose to focus solely on developing its social gaming network, which grew to have over 50 million users. In 2012 PapayaMobile launched AppFlood, a programmatic ads platform. In 2014, Papaya released Kiwi Calendar, a smart social calendar for Android, iOS, and web.

== Products ==
=== AppFlood ===
AppFlood is a programmatic mobile advertising platform. Launched in 2012, AppFlood had attracted 4,500 Android users and was delivering 1.3 billion impressions by its first anniversary. In April 2014, AppFlood launched a real-time bidding platform, the first to be engineered and made available in China. The company had a stated goal being the leading company bridging China and western countries. By August 2014 AppFlood had sent ads to 400 million mobile devices globally.

=== Papaya Games ===
PapayaMobile began as a game company, producing over 13 titles on Symbian, Java, Android and iOS. The first globally successful game from Papaya was Papaya Farm on iOS and Android. In 2012 PapayaMobile began scaling its mobile game production. Papaya's top grossing include Slots Fever, which reached the #1 grossing Casino Games rank on Google Play.

=== Kiwi Calendar ===
In February 2014, Papaya launched Kiwi Calendar, a smart calendar that makes recommendations for local events, on the web. The app has since been released on iOS and Android.
