= Tihomir Preradović =

Croatian composer, producer, and arranger

- Born: 6 April 1960 (age 65); Zagreb, SFR Yugoslavia
- Genres: Pop music, Rock music
- Occupations: Composer; Producer; Arranger
- Instruments: Guitar; Keyboards
- Years active: 1974–present

Tihomir Preradović (born on April 6, 1960, in Zagreb) is a Croatian composer, producer, and arranger.

== Life and career ==
In 1973, Preradović began studying guitar under the instruction of Darko Petrinjak. In 1974, he enrolled in the I Gymnasium of Zagreb and founded his first band, Homo Kiborg, active until 1988; its sound was described as eclectic. He played guitar, provided vocals, and wrote compositions and arrangements. He also performed in the teen pop band Prva ljubav. Preradović graduated in 1986 from the Pedagogical Academy in Zagreb.

During the 1980s, Preradović did sound engineering and production for various underground and alternative bands, including Phantasmagoria and Studeni Studeni. At this time, he started working with composer Vladimir Delač, and consequently began writing and arranging for Delač's collaborators. In the 1990s, he worked with Croatian and Bosnian songwriter and producer Zrinko Tutić. In collaboration with Tutić, Preradović composed and arranged music for mainstream artists including Crvena Jabuka, Severina, Maja Blagdan, Željko Bebek, and Jasna Zlokić. He performed guitar and backing vocalist for Massimo Savić at Jugovizija 1990. Since the early 1990s, he collaborated with Arsen Dedić on multiple theatre productions. The collaboration would continue into the 2000s, with Preradović providing keyboard arrangements for Dedić.

At the beginning of the 2000s, Preradović began working with teen acts. He produced the song "Ti si moja prva ljubav" and an album for Dino Jelusić; the song won the inaugural Junior Eurovision Song Contest 2003 held in Copenhagen. The following year, he arranged Nika Turković's song "Hej Mali", which was the Croatian entry at the Junior Eurovision Song Contest 2004, reaching third place.

Under the pseudonym Slow Mo'T, together with Darko Juranović (D'Knock), he worked with Barbara Tucker. He was a co-producer on Kaliopi's 2010 album Poraka. He subsequently composed and arranged music for singers Jacques Houdek and Nina Kraljić, both of whom have represented Croatia in the Eurovision Song Contest.

He has worked as a composer and producer in theatre, film, and documentary series. His film score work includes music for the 1996 film How the War Started on My Island. He has also worked on commercials and various multimedia projects, and was an advisor of Houdek in his capacity as The Voice coach. In 2025, he was as a member of the Dora jury (the Croatian national Eurovision contest).

== Awards ==
Preradović received a Porin for the best children's album for his work on Junior Eurovision Song Contest (2004). He was one of the producers of Arsen Dedić's 2008 final album, Rebus, which won a Porin.
