= Nebo (Nina Badrić song) =

2012 single by Nina Badrić

Single by Nina Badrić

from the album NeBo
- Released: 22 February 2012
- Recorded: 2011
- Genre: Pop
- Length: 4:01; 3:00 (Eurovision Version)
- Label: Aquarius Records
- Songwriter: Nina Badrić

Nina Badrić singles chronology
"Dat će nam Bog" (2011)	"Nebo" (2012)

Music video
- "Nebo" on YouTube

Eurovision Song Contest 2012 entry
- Country: Croatia
- Artist: Nina Badrić
- Languages: Croatian
- Composer: Nina Badrić
- Lyricist: Nina Badrić

Finals performance
- Semi-final result: 12th
- Semi-final points: 42

Entry chronology
- ◄ "Celebrate" (2011)
- "Mižerja" (2013) ►

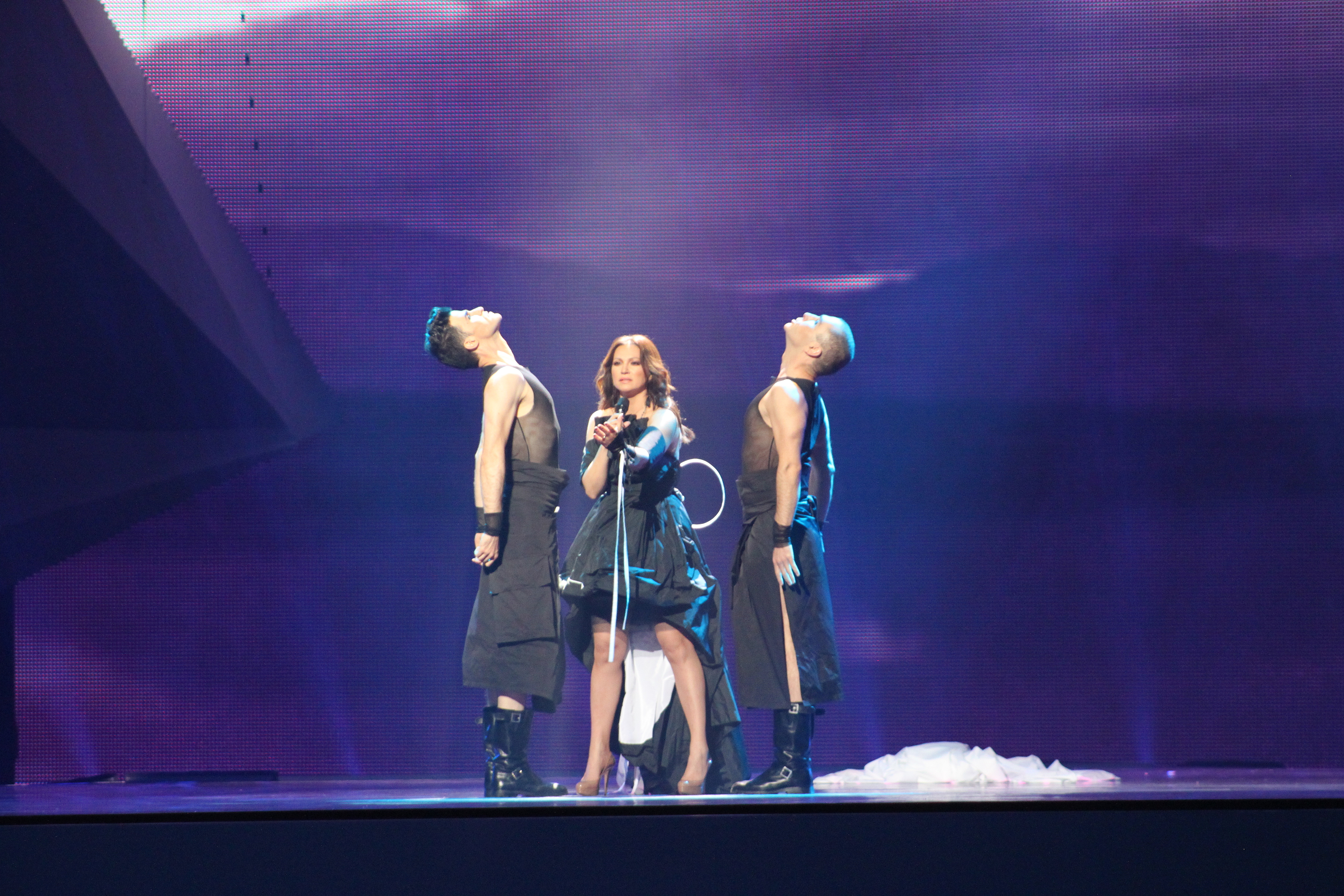
Nina Badrić in Baku (2012)

"Nebo" (pronounced [nêbo], transl. "Heaven" or "Sky") is a song by Croatian singer-songwriter Nina Badrić. It was the Croatian entry in the Eurovision Song Contest 2012. The song is also included on her seventh album also titled Nebo and it serves as the album's fourth single.

== Background ==
On 10 January 2012, Nina Badrić was announced by the Croatian Radiotelevision as the Croatian representative in the Eurovision Song Contest 2012. Elizabeth Homsi, the head of the Entertainment Department at HRT, explained that they were searching for a strong and quality vocal and urban genre, and that is the reason why they chose Nina. Speaking about the selection, Nina said, "That's an honour and a challenge for me."

== Production ==
Nina Badrić wrote and produced the song for her seventh album Nebo. The song was shortened for Eurovision and it was announced on Dora 2012 to represent Croatia. An English version of the song is going to be recorded, but Nina confirmed that she will sing in Croatian for Eurovision.

== Release and promotion ==
"Nebo" was released on iTunes and Amazon on 22 February 2012. Before all promotions, Nina is going to vocal cord surgery. She will embark on a regional promotional tour after Eurovision to promote the single and the album.

== Eurovision Song Contest 2012 ==
The song was performed in the second semi-final and finished in 12th place, thus missing out on qualifying for the grand final. Despite this the song has over 2,072,747 views on YouTube as of 2013 February.

== Track listing ==
- Digital Download
1. "Nebo" (Eurovision 2012) – 3:00
2. "Nebo" – 4:01
