= Papaya (club) =

- Interactive map of Papaya
- Location: Zrće Beach, Pag Island, Croatia
- Type: Live music
- Event: Electronic dance music

Website
- Official Website

Papaya is a club on Zrće Beach on Pag Island in Croatia. Papaya features several pools for pool parties as well as several bars and an open-air dance floor. The club was ranked 20th in DJ Magazine's annual "Top 100 Clubs" reader's poll in 2015.

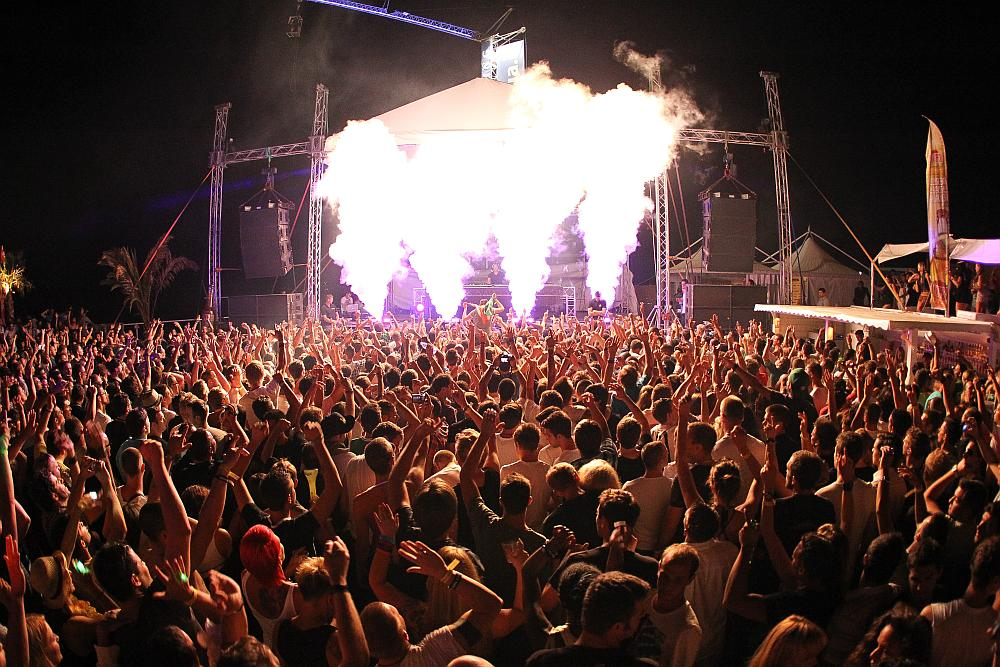
Papaya club @ Zrche beach night

== Notable Artists ==
Armin Van Buuren, Loco Dice, Carl Cox, Calvin Harris and Swedish House Mafia.
