= Hannah Wants =

British DJ and producer

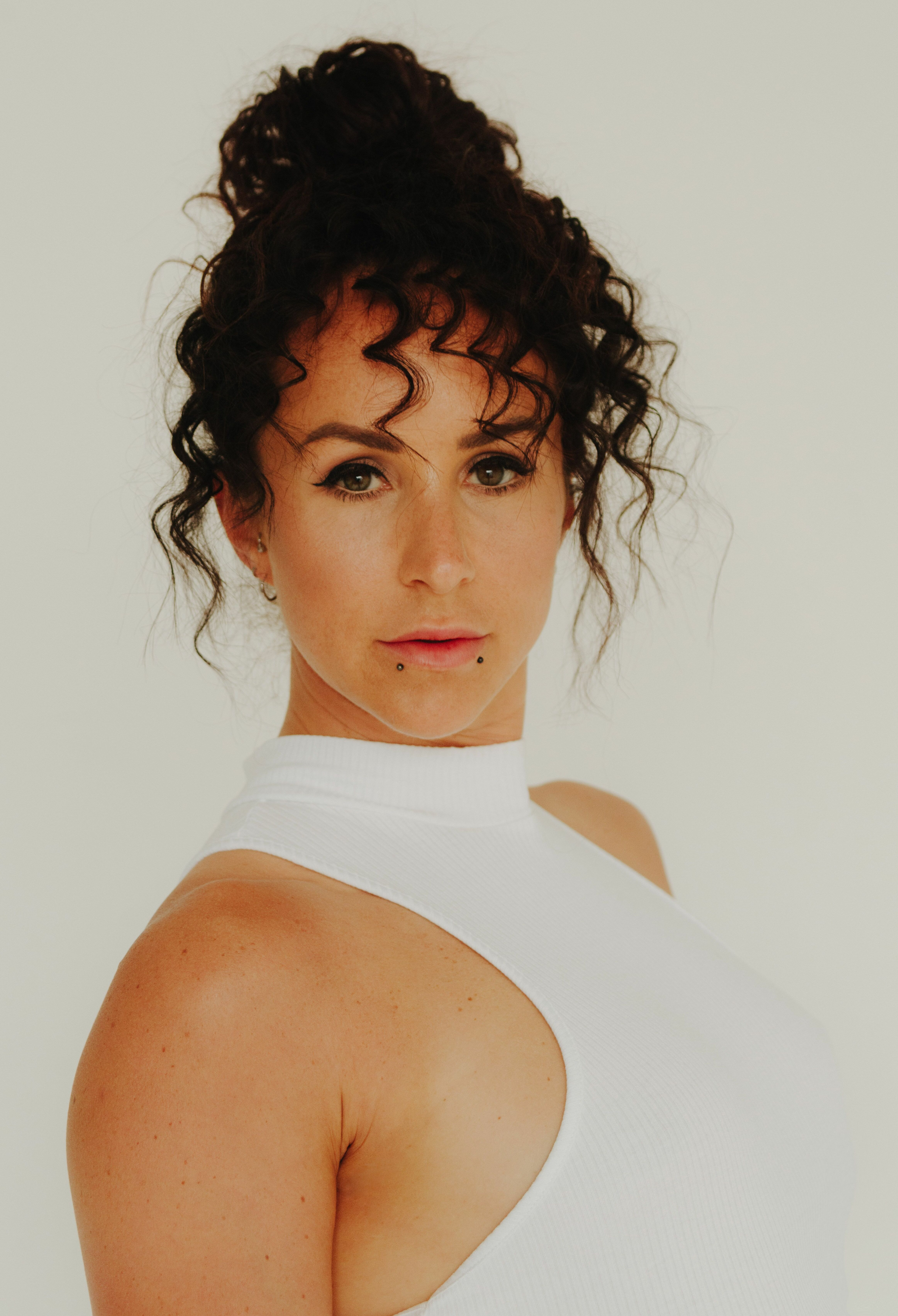

Background information
- Born: Hannah Alicia Smith; 19 June 1987 (age 39); Birmingham, England
- Genres: Electronic, house, minimal
- Occupations: DJ, producer
- Years active: 2002–present
- Labels: Defected Records, Virgin, Mixmag, Fabric, CR2, Food Music, Dirtybird, Stealth
- Website: hannahwants.com

Hannah Alicia Smith (born 19 June 1986) is a British house music DJ and producer better known by her stage name Hannah Wants, and a former professional footballer.

== Early life and education ==
Hannah Alicia Smith was born in Birmingham, England. Her grandfather was a DJ at parties in the 1940s and 1950s. In 2002, when she was 16, she attended her first rave and immediately wanted to become a DJ. She was also inspired by DJ EZ's mixing. She started practising alone in her room playing speed garage, bassline house and old school UK Garage. By 18, she was playing local bars and spent two seasons in Ibiza to pursue a DJ career.

She earned a degree in sports studies at Wolverhampton University.

== Professional football career ==
Prior to her musical career Wants played football for England's youth teams and for Aston Villa L.F.C. She was also on the England women's national football team for over a decade. She scored a hat trick in her debut for Villa Ladies enabling the team to come back from being down 0–2 at Liverpool to win the game 3–2. She scored a team-leading eight goals in the 2003–2004 season when Aston Villa L.F.C. won the Northern Division title. As a striker for Aston Villa she played from U10 through to the senior team level until retiring at the age of 23 to pursue a career as a DJ.

== Music ==
=== DJ career ===
Wants began DJing in 2002 starting out playing speed garage before moving toward bass-influenced house blending new and old music. After three years of performing in small pubs she landed her first paid gig. Her breakthrough came in 2010 in Ibiza while on vacation from university, she was asked to fill in for a DJ to headline at the Es Paradis club. This was to be her first superclub gig after a series of competition wins at Viva! workers' bar in Ibiza. This performance helped her land her first UK residency at the Rainbow Warehouse in Birmingham which led to regular bookings around England.

In 2010, Wants started creating bi-monthly mixtapes which she distributes on SoundCloud. Her early music was co-produced with Chris Lorenzo of Cause & Affect. Their single "Rhymes", inspired by the 2006 Busta Rhymes song "Touch It", reached #13 on the UK Singles Chart in February 2015.

Wants was named Best Breakthrough DJ in 2012 by both Mixmag and DJ Magazine. Mixmag named her 2014 Star of the Year and she won the 2015 DJ Award for Best Bass DJ and Best DJ at the 2015 Bass Music Awards.

In 2015, she had a residency on BBC Radio 1. She was also invited for a Radio 1 Essential Mix by Pete Tong which aired on 30 May 2015. Her 2015 Mixmag cover was the highest selling issue that year.

Also in 2015, Wants launched her brand 'What Hannah Wants', which she designed to showcase up-and-coming DJs with an annual DJ competition and tours.

In 2016, she released three singles on Cr2 Records: "Hidden Love" (featuring vocalist Detour City), "Just" and "Dot Com" (DJ Magazine's most played premiere of 2016). Wants produced the track "Dreamers" for the 2016 Katy B album Honey.

In September 2016 the blog Data Transmission premiered Wants' new track "Found the Ground". A few days later DJ Patrick Nazemi posted a Facebook video comparing the track to the Boddika VIP version of the 2012 track "Mercy" by Boddika and Joy Orbison, stating that the songs were nearly identical and accusing Wants of plagiarism. Others noted that there is a video of Wants playing the Boddika VIP version of "Mercy" in 2014 at a show in Leeds. Wants responded to the allegation stating that it was "no secret that the inspiration for the track was Joy O & Boddika – Mercy (VIP)" and that, while the tracks have similarities, she did not sample or plagiarize "Mercy (VIP)". The comparison video was removed by Nazemi shortly thereafter. "Found the Ground" appears on Wants' mix Fabriclive 89, released on 16 September 2016.

=== Performances ===
Wants played in Maputo, Mozambique in 2013. In 2014, she toured Australia and played Hideout Festival in Zrće. In 2015 Wants headlined her first North American tour – the Night Bass tour. She also played at HARD in the US, Exit in Serbia, Lost & Found in Malta, and Glastonbury. Wants has had a summer residency at Amnesia in Ibiza for three years. In the UK she has headlined festivals including Lovebox, Parklife, We Are FSTVL and Creamfields.

In early 2016 Wants embarked on a five-week tour across the UK joined by the 2015 winners of her What Hannah Wants DJ Competition. She played Electric Daisy Carnival New York in May 2016, Electric Daisy Carnival Las Vegas in June 2016 and Mamby on the Beach in Chicago in July 2016. She played Coachella 2017 in April following a 14-date North America tour and South West Four Festival in London in August 2017. In November 2016, Wants announced a new tour series for 2017 called PLAY, focused on "dark, raw raves with a contemporary twist," featuring a diverse group of new and established DJs. The lineup for the 2017 PLAY tour in the UK included My Nu Leng, Shadow Child and Mak & Pasteman.

== Awards ==
- Winner, Mixmag Best Breakthrough DJ, 2012
- Winner, DJ Mag Best Breakthrough DJ, 2012
- Winner, Mixmag Star of the Year, 2014
- Winner, DJ Award for Best Bass DJ, 2015
- Winner, Bass Music Awards Best DJ, 2015

== Discography ==
=== Mixes ===
Title	Details
Mixmag Presents: What Hannah Wants	Released: 11 March 2016; Label: Mixmag Records; Format: Digital download
Fabriclive.89: Hannah Wants	Released: 23 September 2016; Label: Fabric; Format: CD, digital download

=== Singles ===
Year	Title	UK
2013	"Dappy" (with Chris Lorenzo)	—
2013	"What I Want" (with Chris Lorenzo)	—
2013	"Kneadin" (with Chris Lorenzo)	—
2014	"Girls" (with Chris Lorenzo)	—
2014	"Signs" (with Chris Lorenzo)	—
2014	"Rhymes" (with Chris Lorenzo)	13
2016	"Dot Com"	—
2016	"Just" (feat. Kristine W)	—
2016	"Hidden Love" (feat. Detour City)	—
2016	"Dreamers" (with Katy B)	—
2016	"Found the Ground"	—
2022	"Cure My Desire (feat. Clementine Douglas)"	—
2023	"The One" (feat. ARA)	—
