= Zrće =

Beach on the Croatian island Pag

Coordinates: 44.54°N 14.915°E

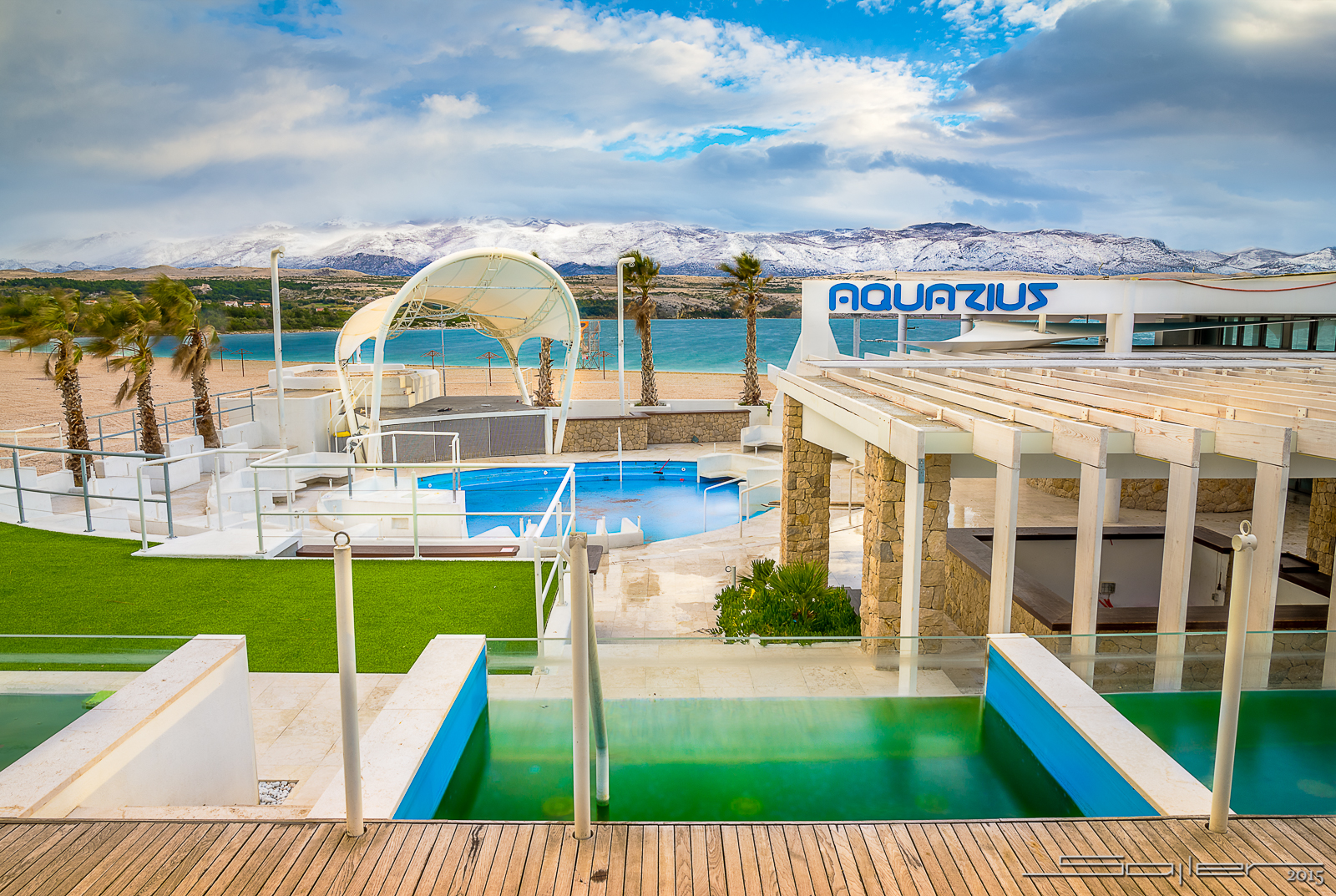
Aquarius night clubs

Zrće (Croatian pronunciation: [ˈzrtɕɛ], [ˈzrtʃɛ]) is a long pebble beach on the Adriatic island of Pag and is located on the Dalmatian coast. Zrće is located near the town of Novalja and the area of Gajac, about 2 kilometres (1 mile) from the town's center. It is one of over 100 Blue Flag beaches in Croatia, having received the award back in 2003.

Zrće beach is a leading Croatian summer destination for partygoers, with many discotheques and beach bars operating during summer months. It regularly features house, EDM, hardstyle, r'n'b, hip-hop and trance DJs at the peak of the Croatian summer season. Zrće Beach are home to clubs as: Aquarius, Kalypso, Papaya, and Noa Beach club. Activities include bungee jumping, jet-ski, party boats and inflatable catapults.

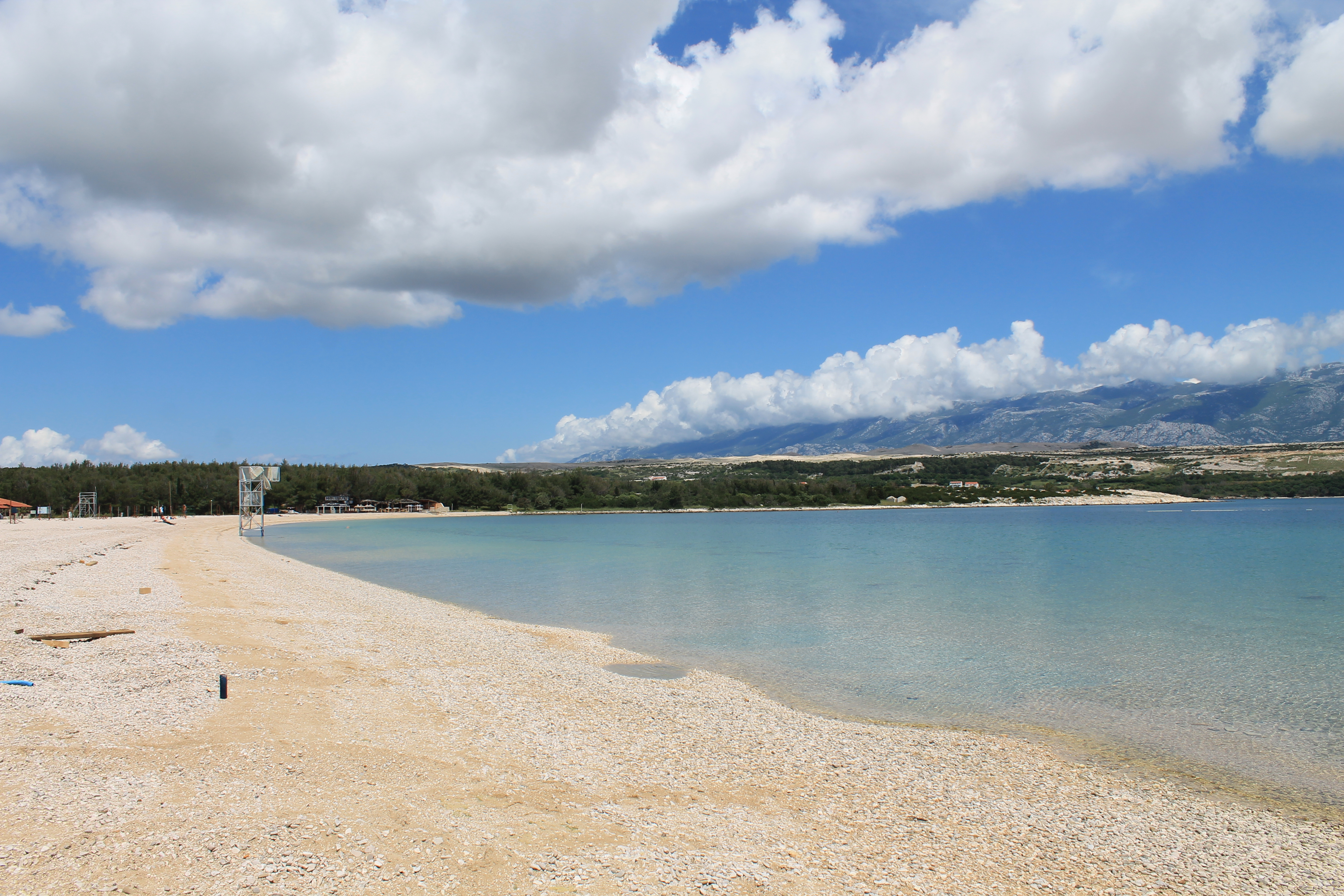
Zrće Beach

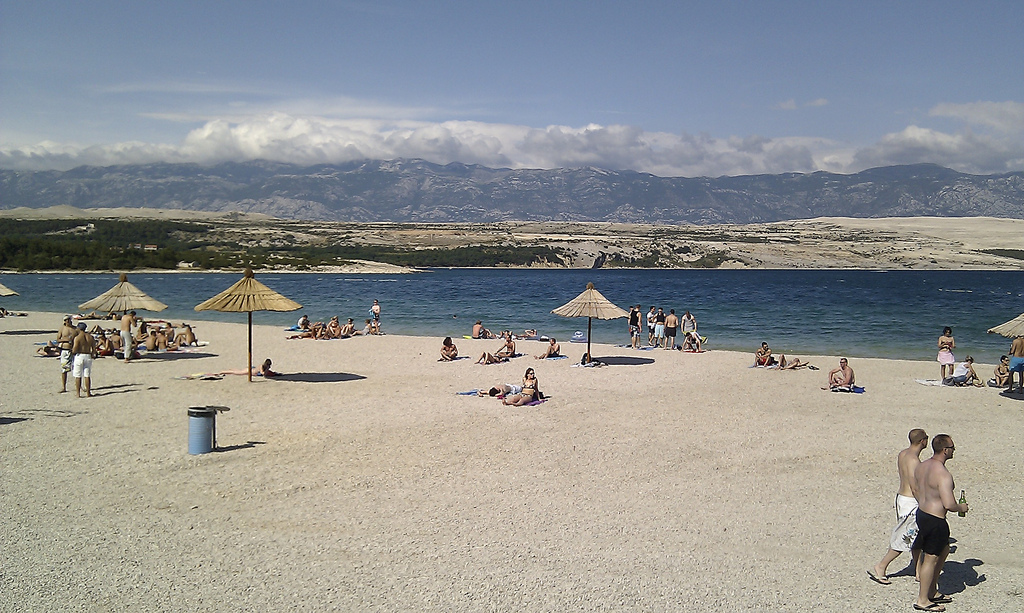
Zrće Beach

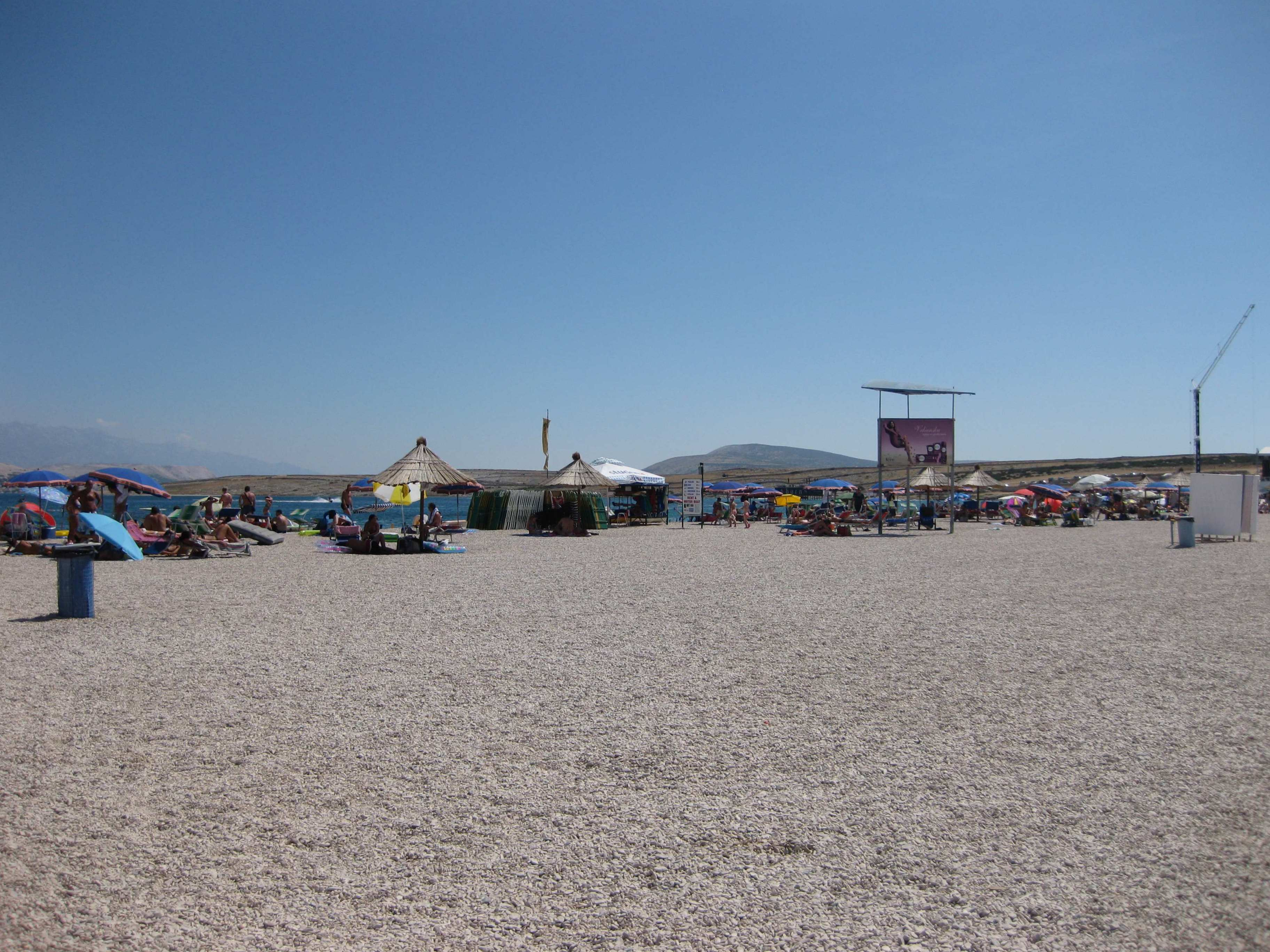
Zrće Beach

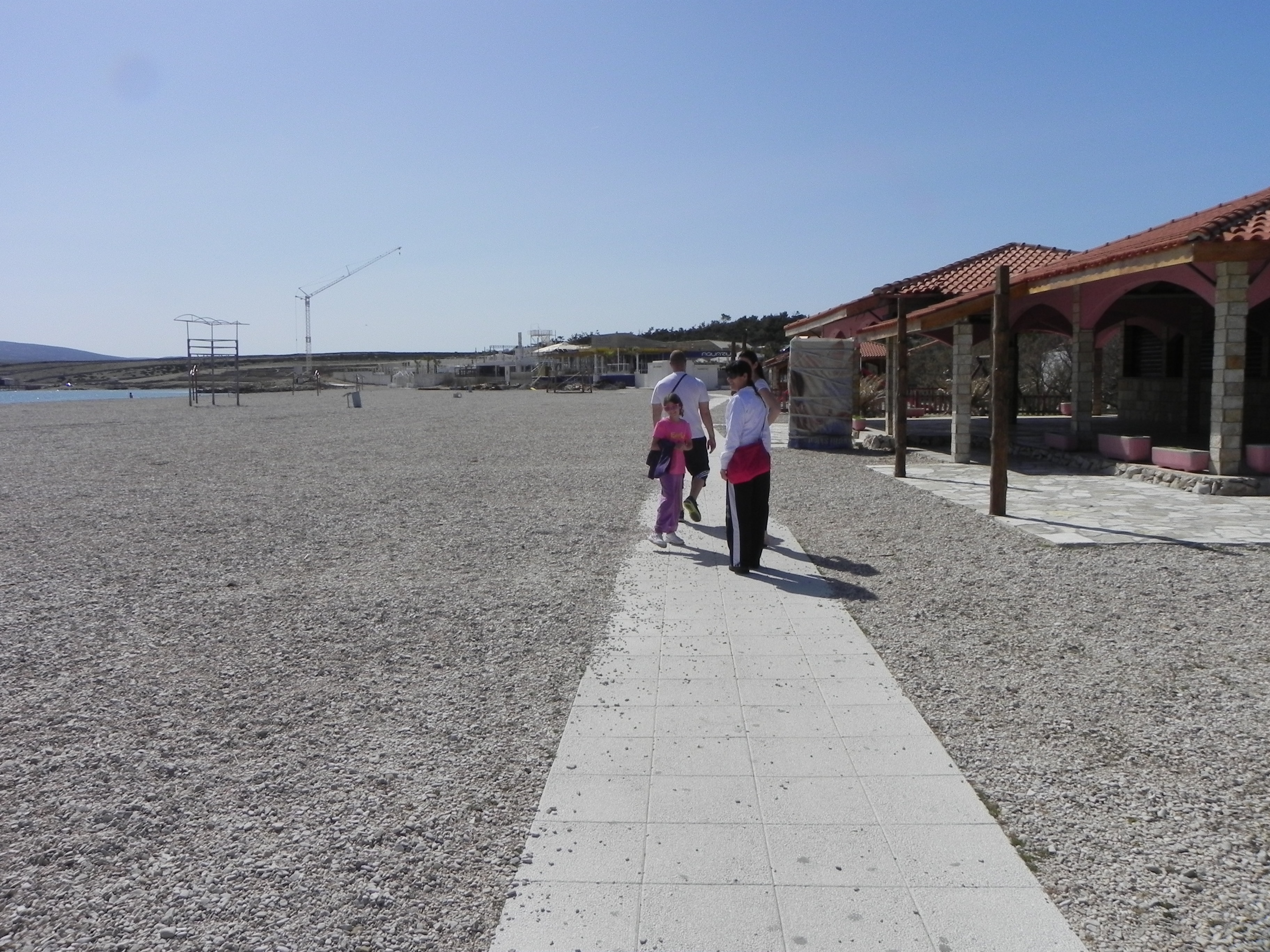
Zrće Beach

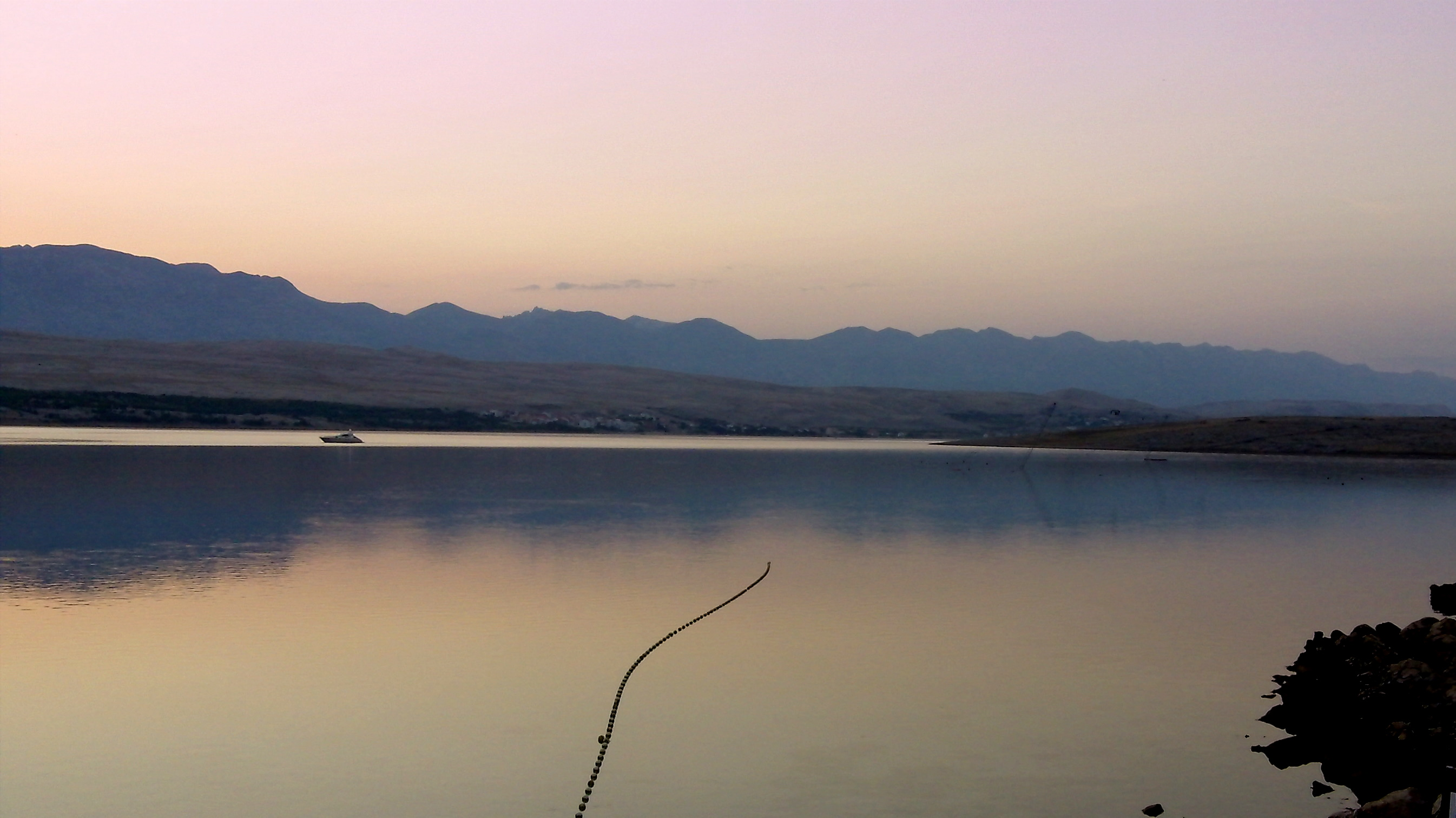
Zrće Beach at 6am

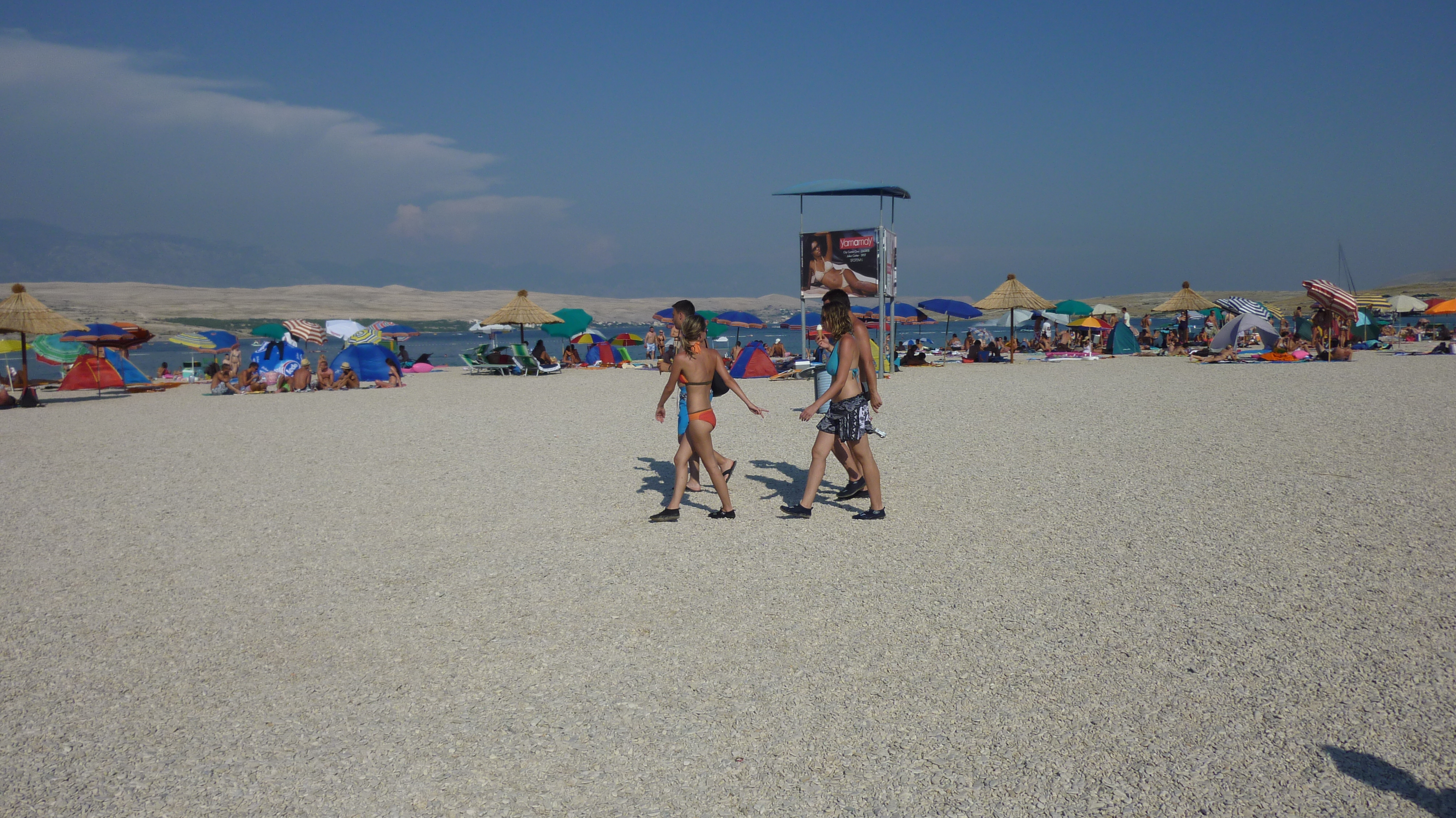
Zrće Beach

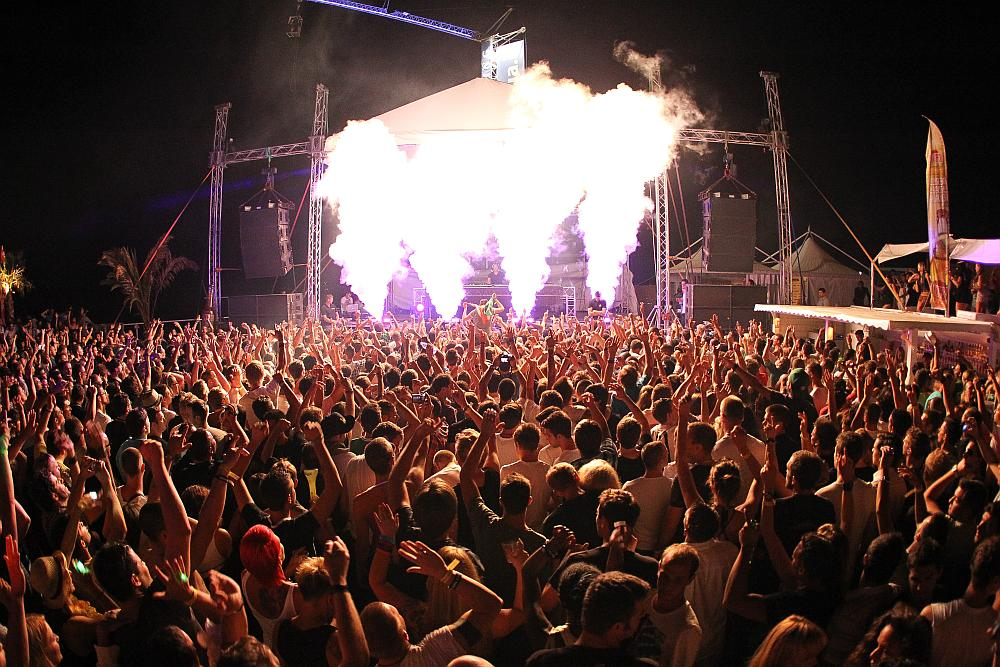
Festival on Zrće Beach

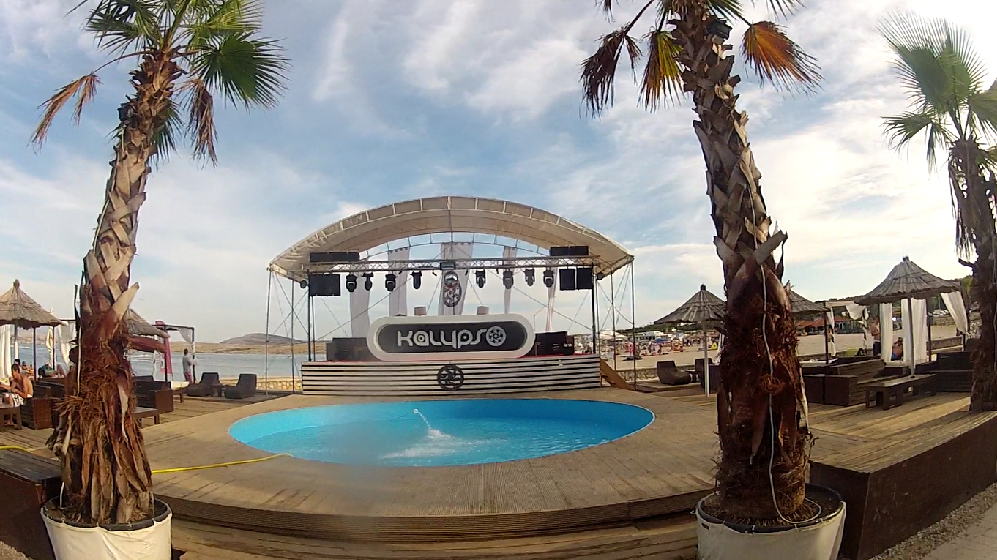
Kalypso after Beach Arena on Zrće Beach
