= Ukraine in the Eurovision Song Contest 2014 =

- Eurovision Song Contest 2014
- Participating broadcaster: National Television Company of Ukraine (NTU)
- Country: Ukraine
- Selection process: Yevrobachennia 2014 – Natsionalnyi vidbir
- Selection date: 21 December 2013

Competing entry
- Song: "Tick-Tock"
- Artist: Mariya Yaremchuk
- Songwriters: Mariya Yaremchuk; Sandra Bjurman

Placement
- Semi-final result: Qualified (5th, 118 points)
- Final result: 6th, 113 points

Participation chronology

Ukraine was represented at the Eurovision Song Contest 2014 with the song "Tick-Tock", written by Mariya Yaremchuk and Sandra Bjurman, and performed by Yaremchuk herself. The Ukrainian participating broadcaster, National Television Company of Ukraine (NTU), organised a national final in order to select its entry for the contest. Twenty entries competed in the national selection held on 21 December 2013 and "Tick-Tock" performed by Mariya Yaremchuk was selected as the winner following the combination of votes from a five-member jury panel and a public televote.

Ukraine was drawn to compete in the first semi-final of the Eurovision Song Contest which took place on 6 May 2014. Performing during the show in position 9, "Tick-Tock" was announced among the top 10 entries of the first semi-final and therefore qualified to compete in the final on 10 May. It was later revealed that Ukraine placed fifth out of the 16 participating countries in the semi-final with 118 points. In the final, Ukraine performed in position 1 and placed sixth out of the 26 participating countries with 113 points.

== Background ==
Prior to the 2014 contest, the National Television Company of Ukraine (NTU) had participated in the Eurovision Song Contest representing Ukraine eleven times since its first entry in 2003, winning the contest in 2004 with the song "Wild Dances" performed by Ruslana. Following the introduction of semi-finals for the 2004, Ukraine had managed to qualify to final in every contest they participated in thus far. Ukraine had been the runner-up in the contest on two occasions: in in 2007 with the song "Dancing Lasha Tumbai" performed by Verka Serduchka and in 2008 with the song "Shady Lady" performed by Ani Lorak. Ukraine's least successful result had been 19th place, achieved in 2005, with the song "Razom nas bahato" performed by GreenJolly.

As part of its duties as participating broadcaster, NTU organises the selection of its entry in the Eurovision Song Contest and broadcasts the event in the country. The broadcaster confirmed its intentions to participate at the 2014 contest on 23 October 2013. In the past, NTU had alternated between both internal selections and national finals in order to select its entry. Between 2011 and 2013, it had set up national finals with several artists to choose both the song and performer, with both the public and a panel of jury members involved in the selection. The method was continued to select the 2014 entry.

== Before Eurovision ==
=== Yevrobachennia 2014 – Natsionalnyi vidbir ===
The Ukrainian national final took place on 21 December 2013 at the NTU Studios in Kyiv. The show was hosted by Timur Myroshnychenko and Tetiana Terekhova and broadcast on Pershyi Natsionalnyi as well as online via NTU's official website 1tv.com.ua and the official Eurovision Song Contest website eurovision.tv.

==== Format ====
The selection of the competing entries for the national final and ultimately the Ukrainian Eurovision entry took place over two stages. In the first stage, artists and songwriters had the opportunity to apply for the competition by attending a scheduled audition. Twenty acts were selected and announced on 8 December 2013. The second stage was the televised final, which took place on 21 December 2013 and featured the twenty acts vying to represent Ukraine in Copenhagen. The winner was selected via the 50/50 combination of votes from a public televote and an expert jury. Both the public televote and the expert jury assigned scores ranging from 1 (lowest) to 12 (highest) and the entry that had the highest number of points following the combination of these scores was declared the winner. Viewers participating in the public televote had the opportunity to submit a single vote per phone number for each of the participating entries via SMS. In the event of a tie, the tie was decided in favour of the entry that received the highest score from the jury.

==== Competing entries ====
Artists and composers had the opportunity to submit their entries between 23 October 2013 and 6 December 2013. Auditions were held on 7 December 2013 at the Novopecherski Lypky in Kyiv where a four-member selection panel consisting of Vlad Baginsky (music producer of NTU), Mikhail Nekrasov (composer and producer), Yevgeniy Feshak (general producer of Radio Lux.FM) and Volodymyr Kozlov (programme director of RU.Music) reviewed the 56 received submissions and shortlisted twenty entries to compete in the national final. On 8 December 2013, the twenty selected competing acts were announced along with the running order, which was decided during a draw that took place following the auditions on 7 December. Among the competing artists was Viktoria Petryk who represented Ukraine in the Junior Eurovision Song Contest 2008.

Artist	Song	Songwriter(s)
Anatolii Shparev	"Waiting for You"	Andrii Osadchuk
Anna Khodorovska	"Yesli yest' lyubov'" (Если есть любовь)	Ruslan Kvinta, Vitalii Kurovskyi
Anna-Maria	"5 Stars Hotel"	Eduard Pristupa, Sergey Ozeryanskiy
Denys Liubimov	"Love"	Denys Liubimov
Yevhen Litvinkovich	"Strelyanaya ptitsa" (Стреляная птица)	Yevhen Litvinkovich
Illaria	"I'm Alive"	Katerina Prishchepa
Lissa Wassabi	"No Fear"	Yelyzaveta Zhykhareva
Marietta	"It's My Life"	Dmitriy Sidorov, Natali Dali
Mariya Yaremchuk	"Tick-Tock"	Mariya Yaremchuk
Natalia Valevska	"Love Makes You Beautiful"	Ylva Persson, Linda Persson
neAngely	"Courageous"	Alexander Bard, Andreas Öhrn, Christian Wahlberg, Per Ljungqvist, Henrik Wikström
Roman Polonskyi	"Wanted Dead or Alive"	Roman Polonsky, Sergey Dubenko
Shanis	"Moya dusha" (Моя душа)	Elaydzha
Stas Shurins	"Why"	Stas Shurins
Tania BerQ	"Believe Me"	Borys Tarshys
Tetiana Shyrko	"Let Go"	Yuliya Slobodyan, Evheniy Matyushenko
Uli Rud	"Tsvetok" (Цветок)	Misha Klimenko, Kseniya Shevchenko
Viktor Romanchenko	"Na krayu propasti" (На краю пропасти)	Volodymyr Dushevnyi, Viktor Romanchenko
Viktoria Petryk	"Love Is Lord"	Giga Kukhianidze, Ben Kadagidze
Volodymyr Tkachenko	"Buty tam, de ty" (Бути там, де ти)	Volodymyr Tkachenko, Iryna Pyrih

==== Final ====
The final took place on 21 December 2013. Twenty entries competed and the winner, "Tick-Tock" performed by Mariya Yaremchuk, was selected through the combination of votes from a public televote and an expert jury. Ties were decided in favour of the entries that received higher scores from the jury. The jury panel consisted of Oleksandr Panteleymonov (general director of NTU), Vlad Baginsky (music producer of NTU), Yuriy Rybchynsky (poet), Yan Tabachnyk (composer) and Mikhail Nekrasov (composer and producer). 10,210 votes were registered by the televote during the show. In addition to the performances of the competing entries, 2011 Ukrainian Eurovision entrant Mika Newton, 2013 Ukrainian Eurovision entrant Zlata Ognevich, 2013 Ukrainian Junior Eurovision entrant Sofia Tarasova, Kamaliya, Masha Sobko, Matias and Natalia Buchynska performed as guests.

Final – 21 December 2013
R/O	Artist	Song	Jury	Televote		Total	Place
R/O	Artist	Song	Jury	Votes	Points	Total	Place
1	Anna-Maria	"5 Stars Hotel"	3	136	1	4	16
2	Roman Polonskyi	"Wanted Dead or Alive"	5	73	1	6	12
3	Uli Rud	"Tsvetok"	1	76	1	2	20
4	Marietta	"It's My Life"	4	107	1	5	14
5	Stas Shurins	"Why"	5	194	4	9	10
6	Anatolii Shparev	"Waiting for You"	7	124	1	8	11
7	Natalia Valevska	"Love Makes You Beautiful"	5	1,050	9	14	7
8	Lissa Wassabi	"No Fear"	1	170	2	3	19
9	Volodymyr Tkachenko	"Buty tam, de ty"	11	368	5	16	4
10	Shanis	"Moya dusha"	9	47	1	10	9
11	Viktoria Petryk	"Love Is Lord"	10	476	7	17	2
12	Yevhen Litvinkovich	"Strelyanaya ptitsa"	2	1,090	10	12	8
13	neAngely	"Courageous"	6	800	8	14	6
14	Illaria	"I'm Alive"	8	420	6	14	5
15	Tetiana Shyrko	"Let Go"	3	171	3	6	13
16	Tania BerQ	"Believe Me"	3	41	1	4	16
17	Mariya Yaremchuk	"Tick-Tock"	12	3,478	12	24	1
18	Viktor Romanchenko	"Na krayu propasti"	5	1,170	11	16	3
19	Anna Khodorovska	"Yesli yest' lyubov'"	2	99	1	3	18
20	Denys Liubimov	"Love"	4	120	1	5	14

==== Controversy ====
Following Mariya Yaremchuk's victory at the Ukrainian national final, several participants launched a protest against the final results, alleging that the phone lines for their entries were blocked while the phone line for Yaremchuk remained open. Olena Mozhova, the producer of Volodymyr Tkachenko, challenged the legitimacy of the results and planned to take legal action; similar complaints were also launched by Viktoria Petryk and the duo neAngely regarding the results of the public vote.

=== Preparation ===
The official music video of "Tick-Tock", directed by Serhiy Knyazev and produced by Alternatyva Company, was released on 17 March. A revamped version of the song, featuring new arrangement and lyrics written by Mariya Yaremchuk in cooperation with Sandra Bjurman, was also featured in the music video.

=== Promotion ===
Mariya Yaremchuk made several appearances across Europe to specifically promote "Tick-Tock" as the Ukrainian Eurovision entry. On 7 February, Yaremchuk performed an alternate version of "Tick-Tock" during the semi-final of the Maltese Eurovision national final. On 5 April, Yaremchuk performed during the Eurovision in Concert event which was held at the Melkweg venue in Amsterdam, Netherlands and hosted by Cornald Maas and Sandra Reemer. On 13 April, Yaremchuk performed during the London Eurovision Party, which was held at the Café de Paris venue in London, United Kingdom and hosted by Nicki French and Paddy O'Connell. On 25 and 26 April, Mariya Yaremchuk took part in promotional activities in Greece which included television and radio appearances, as well as performing during an event organised by OGAE Greece and held at the Shamone Club in Athens.

== At Eurovision ==
Mariya Yaremchuk presenting herself and "Tick-Tock" at the Eurovision Song Contest 2014

According to Eurovision rules, all nations with the exceptions of the host country and the "Big Five" (France, Germany, Italy, Spain and the United Kingdom) are required to qualify from one of two semi-finals in order to compete for the final; the top ten countries from each semi-final progress to the final. The European Broadcasting Union (EBU) split up the competing countries into six different pots based on voting patterns from previous contests, with countries with favourable voting histories put into the same pot. On 20 January 2014, a special allocation draw was held which placed each country into one of the two semi-finals, as well as which half of the show they would perform in. Ukraine was placed into the first semi-final, to be held on 6 May 2014, and was scheduled to perform in the second half of the show.

Once all the competing songs for the 2014 contest had been released, the running order for the semi-finals was decided by the shows' producers rather than through another draw, so that similar songs were not placed next to each other. Ukraine was set to perform in position 9, following the entry from Azerbaijan and before the entry from Belgium.

In Ukraine, both the semi-finals and the final were broadcast on Pershyi Natsionalnyi with commentary by Timur Miroshnychenko and Tetiana Terekhova. The three shows were also broadcast via radio on UR-2 with commentary by Olena Zelinchenko. The Ukrainian spokesperson, who announced the Ukrainian votes during the final, was 2013 Ukrainian representative Zlata Ognevich.

=== Semi-final ===
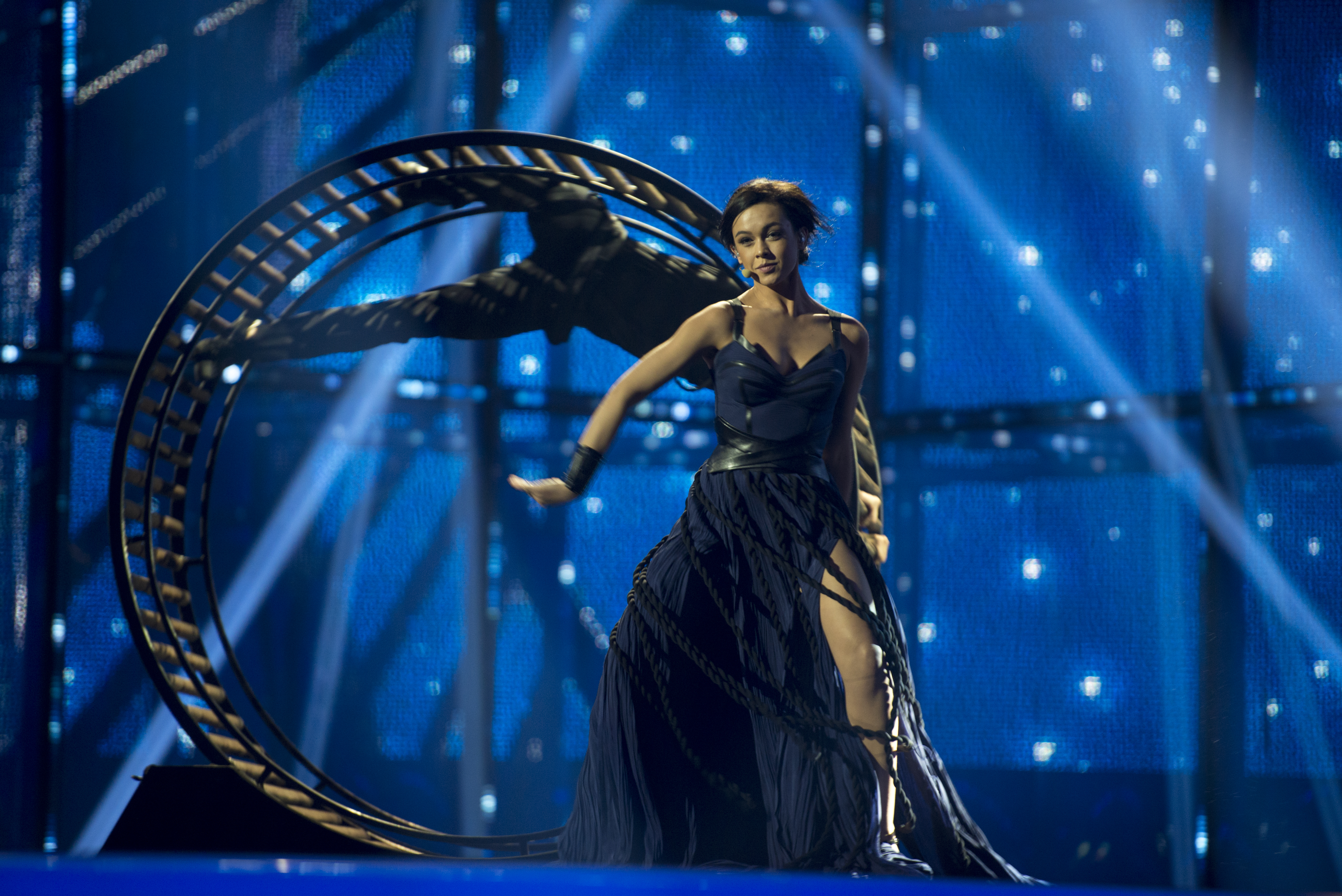
Mariya Yaremchuk during a rehearsal before the first semi-final

Mariya Yaremchuk took part in technical rehearsals on 29 April and 2 May, followed by dress rehearsals on 5 and 6 May. This included the jury show on 5 May where the professional juries of each country watched and voted on the competing entries.

The Ukrainian performance featured Mariya Yaremchuk performing on stage in a long dark blue dress with black leather ribbons designed by Hanna Osmekhina together with a dancer and four backing vocalists. The performance featured the dancer performing acrobatic choreography on a large running wheel that symbolised the real living tick-tock mechanism of a clock and the atmosphere of love. The performance also featured the use of a wind machine with a night starry sky as well as images of clocks and cog wheels appearing on the LED screens. The stage director and choreographer for the Ukrainian performance was the director of the ballet "Freedom" Olena Kolyadenko. The dancer that joined Mariya Yaremchuk on stage was Igor Kuleshyn, while the four backing vocalists were Anna Linnea, Graciela Chin A Loi, Anneli Maria Tornkvist and Elin Eva Maria Svensson.

At the end of the show, Ukraine was announced as having finished in the top 10 and subsequently qualifying for the grand final. It was later revealed that Ukraine placed fifth in the semi-final, receiving a total of 118 points.

=== Final ===
Shortly after the first semi-final, a winners' press conference was held for the ten qualifying countries. As part of this press conference, the qualifying artists took part in a draw to determine which half of the grand final they would subsequently participate in. This draw was done in the order the countries were announced during the semi-final. Ukraine was drawn to compete in the first half. Following this draw, the shows' producers decided upon the running order of the final, as they had done for the semi-finals. Ukraine was subsequently placed to perform in position 1, before the entry from Belarus.

Mariya Yaremchuk once again took part in dress rehearsals on 9 and 10 May before the final, including the jury final where the professional juries cast their final votes before the live show. Mariya Yaremchuk performed a repeat of her semi-final performance during the final on 10 May. Ukraine placed sixth in the final, scoring 113 points.

=== Voting ===
Voting during the three shows consisted of 50 percent public televoting and 50 percent from a jury deliberation. The jury consisted of five music industry professionals who were citizens of the country they represent, with their names published before the contest to ensure transparency. This jury was asked to judge each contestant based on: vocal capacity; the stage performance; the song's composition and originality; and the overall impression by the act. In addition, no member of a national jury could be related in any way to any of the competing acts in such a way that they cannot vote impartially and independently. The individual rankings of each jury member were released shortly after the grand final.

Following the release of the full split voting by the EBU after the conclusion of the competition, it was revealed that Ukraine had placed eighth with the public televote and twelfth with the jury vote in the final. In the public vote, Ukraine scored 112 points, while with the jury vote, Ukraine scored 78 points. In the first semi-final, Ukraine placed fifth with the public televote with 119 points and sixth with the jury vote, scoring 88 points.

Below is a breakdown of points awarded to Ukraine and awarded by Ukraine in the first semi-final and grand final of the contest, and the breakdown of the jury voting and televoting conducted during the two shows:

==== Points awarded to Ukraine ====
Points awarded to Ukraine (Semi-final 1)
Score	Country
12 points	Armenia; Azerbaijan
10 points	Estonia
8 points	Moldova; Montenegro
7 points	Belgium; Denmark; Iceland; Latvia; Portugal; Russia
6 points	Sweden
5 points	Netherlands; Spain
4 points	San Marino
3 points	Albania; Hungary
2 points	
1 point	

Points awarded to Ukraine (Final)
Score	Country
12 points	
10 points	Azerbaijan; Italy; Moldova
8 points	Belarus; Estonia
7 points	Latvia; Montenegro; Russia
6 points	Georgia; Spain
5 points	Austria; Greece; Israel; Lithuania; Poland
4 points	Belgium
3 points	
2 points	Finland; Hungary
1 point	Denmark

==== Points awarded by Ukraine ====
Points awarded by Ukraine (Semi-final 1)
Score	Country
12 points	Armenia
10 points	Sweden
8 points	Hungary
7 points	Netherlands
6 points	Russia
5 points	Azerbaijan
4 points	San Marino
3 points	Iceland
2 points	Moldova
1 point	Montenegro

Points awarded by Ukraine (Final)
Score	Country
12 points	Sweden
10 points	Armenia
8 points	Austria
7 points	Poland
6 points	Belarus
5 points	Germany
4 points	Russia
3 points	Hungary
2 points	Spain
1 point	Azerbaijan

==== Detailed voting results ====
The following members comprised the Ukrainian jury:

- Oleksandr Zlotnyk (jury chairperson) – composer
- Kateryna Komar – producer, vocal teacher
- Kostiantyn Mishukov – producer, DJ
- Alla Popova – singer, composer
- Olena Valovyk – singer

Detailed voting results from Ukraine (Semi-final 1)
R/O	Country	O. Zlotnyk	K. Komar	K. Mishukov	A. Popova	O. Valovyk	Jury Rank	Televote Rank	Combined Rank	Points
01	Armenia	2	1	1	2	1	1	1	1	12
02	Latvia	15	10	4	15	15	13	9	13	
03	Estonia	13	6	13	13	10	12	13	14	
04	Sweden	1	2	2	1	2	2	4	2	10
05	Iceland	4	9	6	4	8	4	14	8	3
06	Albania	8	7	11	7	3	5	15	11	
07	Russia	5	12	14	6	6	9	2	5	6
08	Azerbaijan	9	5	12	9	7	7	5	6	5
09	Ukraine									
10	Belgium	12	11	15	12	11	14	8	12	
11	Moldova	7	14	9	8	5	10	10	9	2
12	San Marino	11	13	7	11	12	11	7	7	4
13	Portugal	14	15	8	14	13	15	11	15	
14	Netherlands	3	4	3	3	4	3	6	4	7
15	Montenegro	10	3	10	10	9	8	12	10	1
16	Hungary	6	8	5	5	14	6	3	3	8

Detailed voting results from Ukraine (Final)
R/O	Country	O. Zlotnyk	K. Komar	K. Mishukov	A. Popova	O. Valovyk	Jury Rank	Televote Rank	Combined Rank	Points
01	Ukraine									
02	Belarus	3	8	10	3	3	5	4	5	6
03	Azerbaijan	9	9	17	9	10	9	10	10	1
04	Iceland	25	22	22	24	24	25	16	21	
05	Norway	23	15	25	23	23	23	13	19	
06	Romania	12	11	21	13	12	13	19	15	
07	Armenia	8	2	4	8	8	6	2	2	10
08	Montenegro	22	20	23	20	17	21	23	24	
09	Poland	6	21	11	6	7	8	1	4	7
10	Greece	7	13	16	7	6	7	15	11	
11	Austria	5	3	3	5	5	3	5	3	8
12	Germany	1	4	2	1	1	2	9	6	5
13	Sweden	2	1	1	2	2	1	6	1	12
14	France	13	24	19	19	16	20	22	22	
15	Russia	10	14	9	10	11	10	3	7	4
16	Italy	24	25	13	25	25	24	25	25	
17	Slovenia	14	18	14	14	14	14	18	14	
18	Finland	20	10	6	11	9	12	20	16	
19	Spain	4	5	8	4	4	4	14	9	2
20	Switzerland	16	16	15	16	19	18	8	12	
21	Hungary	11	7	7	12	18	11	7	8	3
22	Malta	17	19	18	17	13	19	24	23	
23	Denmark	15	12	20	18	15	16	21	20	
24	Netherlands	21	17	5	15	21	15	12	13	
25	San Marino	19	23	24	21	20	22	11	17	
26	United Kingdom	18	6	12	22	22	17	17	18	
