= Gaitana (singer) =

Ukrainian singer (born 1979)

Gaitana Гайтана
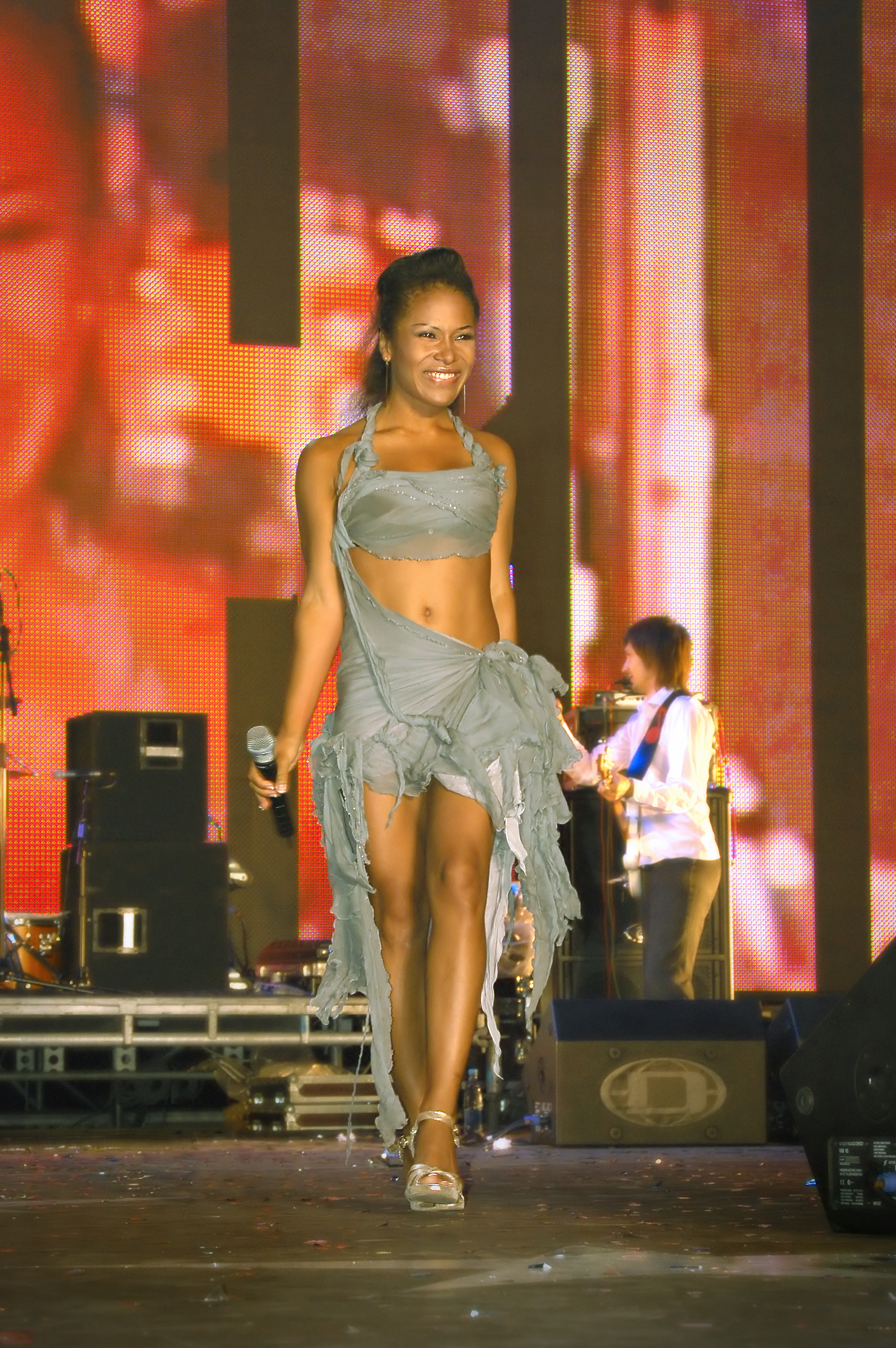
- Gaitana in 2006

Background information
- Born: Gaita-Lurdes Klaverivna Essami; 24 March 1979 (age 47); Kyiv, Ukrainian SSR, USSR
- Genres: Pop; dance-pop; R&B
- Occupations: Singer; songwriter
- Instrument: Vocals
- Years active: 2003–present
- Website: gaitana.com/en

Gaita-Lurdes Klaverivna Essami (Ukrainian: Гайта-Лурдес Клаверівна Ессамі; born 24 March 1979), known professionally as Gaitana (Ukrainian: Гайтана), is a Ukrainian singer and songwriter. Essami's style of pop music has been described as containing elements of jazz, funk, soul, and folk. She represented Ukraine in the Eurovision Song Contest 2012 in Baku, performing the song "Be My Guest" and placing 15th in the final.

Gaitana is the third Eurovision contestant of African origin ever to be born in the former USSR, after Lithuanian singer and guitarist Viktoras "Victor" Diawara of LT United and Estonian singer Daana Ots of Suntribe.

== Early life ==
Essami was born in Kyiv to a Ukrainian mother, Tatiana Petrova, and a father, Klaver Essami, from the Republic of the Congo. When she was an infant, the family left Ukraine and moved to her father's hometown of Brazzaville. They lived in the Republic of the Congo for five years, until Essami and her mother returned to Ukraine in 1985. Due to living most of her early childhood in the Republic of the Congo, Essami could only speak French and Lingala upon returning to Ukraine, although she later became fluent in Ukrainian and Russian as well. Essami's estranged father remained in Brazzaville, where he owned a transportation business.

In Kyiv, Essami attended a music school, where she learned how to play the saxophone. She later pursued an education in economics. Since her youth, Essami was a decorated athlete who was a champion table tennis player. In 1991, Essami competed in the children's music competition Fantasy Lotto Nadiya, where she placed third. Following the competition, Essami began singing in a children's music ensemble led by Volodymyr Bystryakov. In the Soviet Union, R&B music was not widespread, so Essami was introduced to foreign songs while attending underground music venues as a teenager.

== Music career ==
Essami began her professional music career in 2003, releasing her debut studio album O tebe. She has gone on to release seven other albums in her career: Slidom za toboyu (2005), Kapli dozhdya (2007), Kukabarra (2008), Taynyye zhelaniya (2008), Tolko segodnya (2010), Viva, Europe! (2012), and Voodooman (2014). Her songs are recorded in Russian, Ukrainian, or English. Following the inauguration of Barack Obama as President of the United States in 2009, Essami performed at a special inauguration ball in his honor in Kyiv.

In January 2012, Essami was selected to compete in Evrobachennya 2012, the Ukrainian national final for the Eurovision Song Contest 2012. She competed with the song "Be My Guest". Essami went on to win the competition, placing first with the professional jury and second with the Ukrainian public. Following her win, Essami was the victim of racist comments by members of the far-right in Ukraine. Yuriy Syrotyuk, a high-ranking member of the nationalist Svoboda political party, stated that Essami's selection as the Ukrainian representative would hinder Ukraine's ability to join the European Union, as she is portraying the country as if they are "of a different continent". Essami responded to the comments by stating that Ukraine was her beloved motherland, and that non-white Ukrainians should not feel like they have to leave the country to be accepted.

Nevertheless, Essami continued as the Ukrainian representative to the contest in Baku, becoming the first Afro-Ukrainian to represent Ukraine in the Eurovision Song Contest. She competed in the second semi-final on 24 May 2012, where she placed eighth and qualified to the final. Afterwards, she placed 15th in the final held on 26 May, scoring a total of 65 points.

== Discography ==
=== Albums ===
- 2003 - О тебе (Gaitana and Unity) - About You
- 2005 - Слідом за тобою - Following You
- 2007 - Капли дождя - Raindrops
- 2008 - Kукaбaррa - Kukabarra
- 2008 - Тайные желания - Secret Desires
- 2010 - Только сегодня - Only Today
- 2012 - Viva, Europe!
- 2014 – Voodooman
- 2024 - Сонце В Тобі - The Sun In You

=== Singles ===
- 2006 - "Двa вікна" - Two Windows
- 2007 - "Шaленій" - Go Crazy
- 2009 - "Нещодавно" (Gaitana and Stas Konkin) - Lately
- 2012 - "Be My Guest"
- 2013 - "Aliens"
- 2014 - "Galaxy"
- 2020 - "A Paper Plane" (By Aryan King)
- 2024 - "Don't Stop the Music
- 2024 - "I've Got All"
- 2025 - "Can't Look Back"

== Awards ==
- Showbiz award
  - Best European Star (special award)
- Ukrainian Music Awards
  - Best female singer 2008
  - Best album 2008

Awards and achievements
Preceded by Mika Newton with "Angel"	Ukraine in the Eurovision Song Contest; 2012	Succeeded by Zlata Ognevich with "Gravity"
