= Mariya Yaremchuk =

Ukrainian singer (born 1993)

Mariia Yaremchuk Марія Яремчук
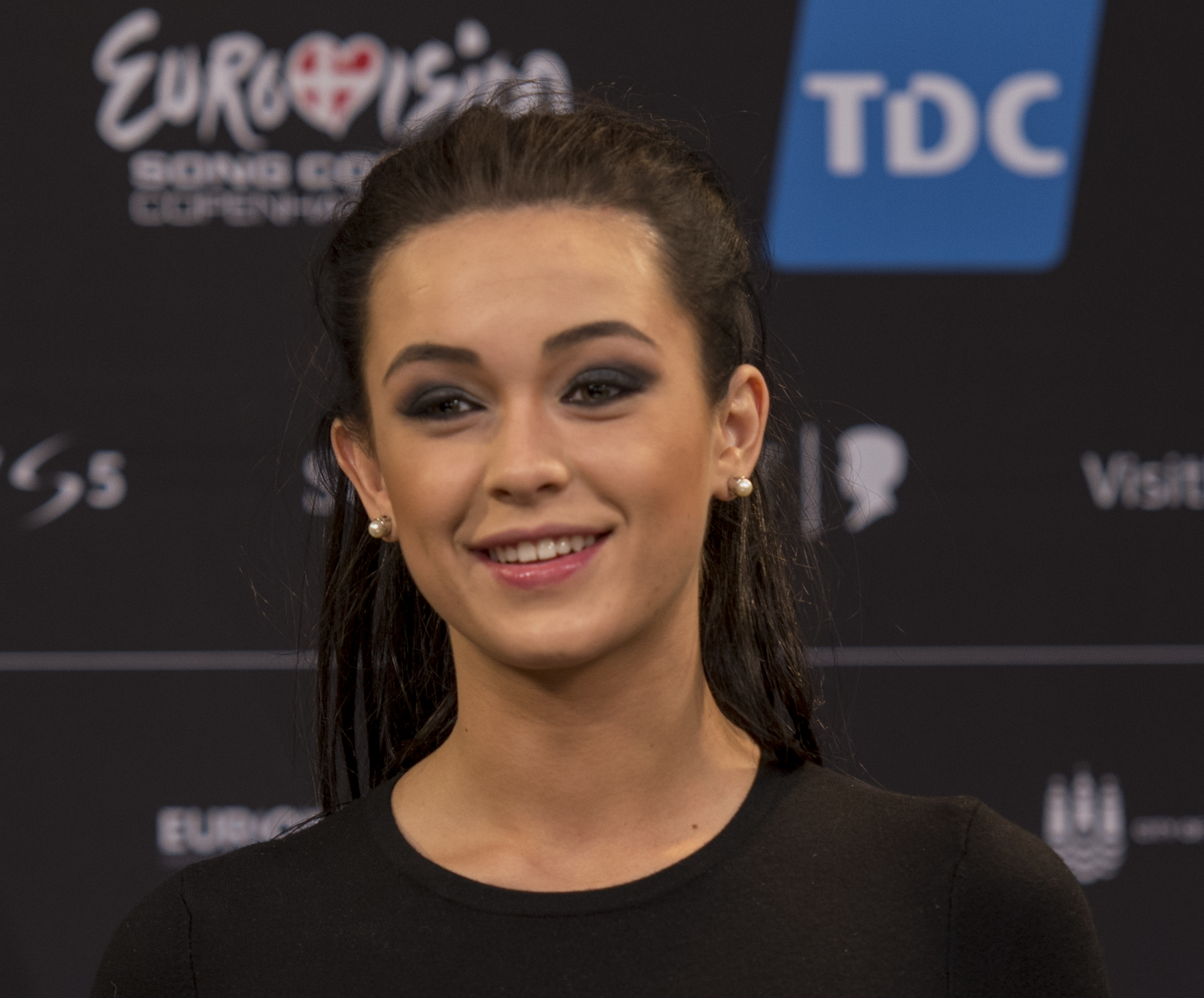
- Mariia Yaremchuk (2014)

Background information
- Also known as: Mariya Yaremchuk; Maria Yaremchuk
- Born: Mariia Nazarivna Yaremchuk; 2 March 1993 (age 33); Chernivtsi, Ukraine
- Genres: Pop, pop-folk
- Occupation: singer
- Years active: 2012–2018 (on hiatus); 2023 (brief return)

Mariia Nazarivna Yaremchuk (Ukrainian: Марія Назарівна Яремчук; born 2 March 1993), also transliterated as Mariya Yaremchuk or Maria Yaremchuk, is a Ukrainian singer. Yaremchuk represented Ukraine in the Eurovision Song Contest 2014. She finished 6th in the grand final out of 26 countries.

== Early life ==
Yaremchuk was born in Chernivtsi and is the daughter of People's Artist of Ukraine and singer, musician Nazariy Yaremchuk and his second wife, Darina. Mariya was named after her paternal grandmother. Yaremchuk's father died of stomach cancer when she was two years old. Friends and family have stated that Mariya was very dear to her well-known father.

"My mother told me that my father liked to take my pillow with him on tour. He never parted with it. And when he came from America, where he was being treated for cancer, he bought a camera. He filmed how we lived. At the age of 16, I found the recordings in the attic. Before that, I knew about my dad that he was a legend of Ukrainian pop music. And in the pictures, I saw a sensitive and beautiful man. And a handsome man. I have never met such men. "

— Mariya Yaremchuk

Yaremchuk has an older half-sister Vera from her mother's first marriage and two brothers by her father's side, Dmytro and Nazariy. People's Artist and Hero of Ukraine Vasyl Zinkevych is her godfather.

Yaremchuk considers herself an apolitical person, but in December 2013 she declared that she "in the elections and in general, morally, and as a singer" supported (the political party) Party of Regions. (Note: Rinat Akhmetov, who sponsored Yaremchuk's entry in "New Wave 2012", is the alleged financier and chieftain of Party of Regions.)

== Music career ==
=== 2012: Holos Krayiny and New Wave 2012 ===
Yaremchuk was a finalist of the TV project Holos Krainy. She reached fourth place. In 2012, she represented Ukraine at the international contest of young singers New Wave 2012, where she came in third. Yaremchuk was sponsored by Rinat Akhmetov during this festival. Akhmetov is friends with, one of the organizers of New Wave, Igor Krutoy. Mariya also participated in Evrobachennya 2013 – Natsionalyni vidbir, the national final used for finding Ukraine's representative in the Eurovision Song Contest, where Mariya came fifth with the song "Imagine".

=== 2013–2014: Eurovision Song Contest ===
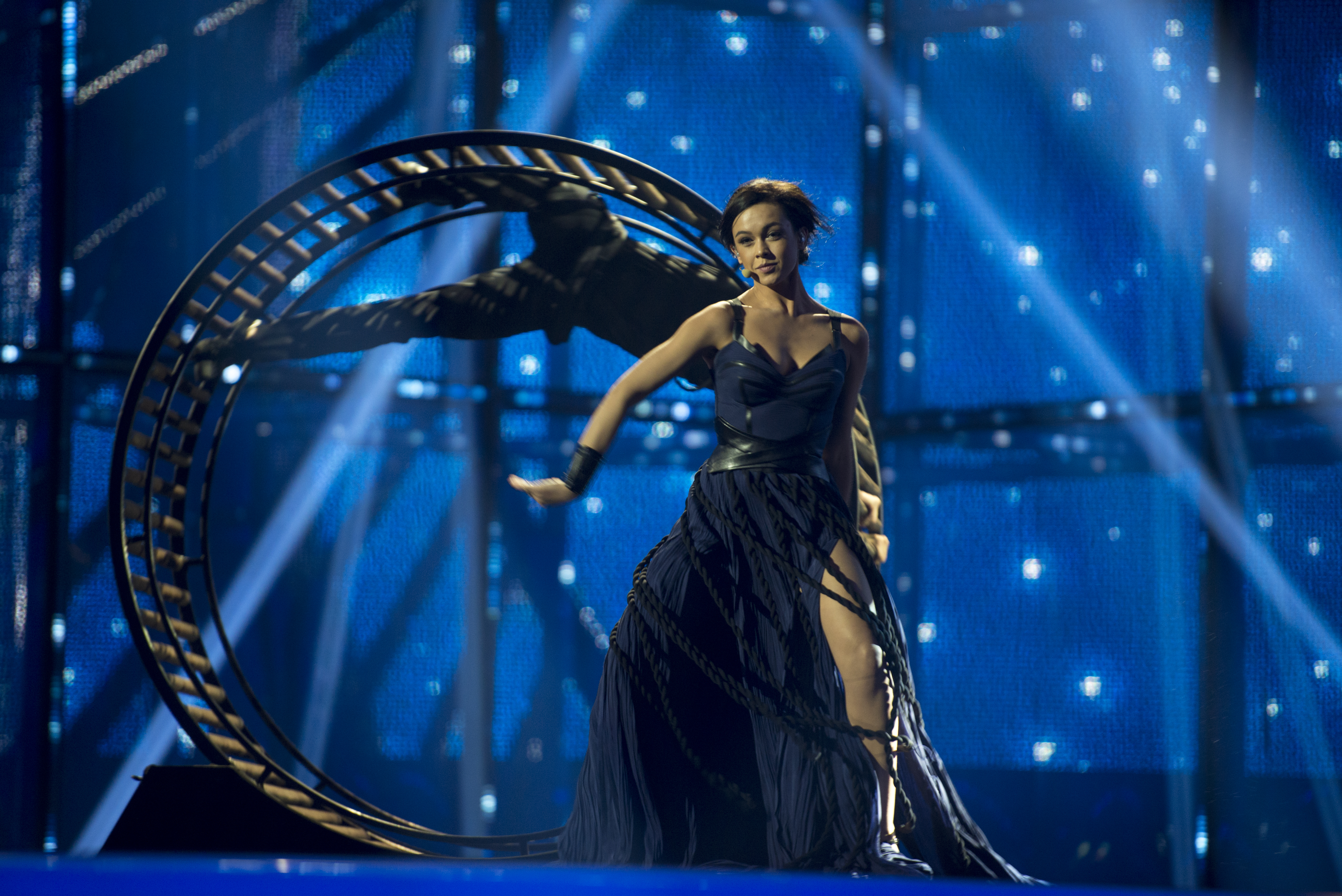
Yaremchuk at the Eurovision Song Contest 2014

On 21 December 2013, Yaremchuk won the Ukrainian national final for the Eurovision Song Contest 2014 with her song "Tick-Tock". On 6 May 2014 was held the first semi-final of the Eurovision Song Contest and Mariya qualified in the Grand Final. In the Grand Final, she finished sixth out of 26 countries.

During her Eurovision participation, Yaremchuk received a lot of international media attention due to her being the Ukrainian representative in a contest with Russia in the wake of the annexation of Crimea by the Russian Federation. At the #HappyWall in Copenhagen, Yaremchuk wrote "Proud to be Ukrainian".

=== 2014–2018: Further success in Ukraine and acting debut ===
After the Eurovision Song Contest, Yaremchuk released a string of singles. In 2015, she released a cover of her father's signature song "Rodyna" on the day of the twentieth anniversary of his passing. Following that, she released "Do tebe" in 2016. In 2017, Yaremchuk released "Ty v meni ye", which music video was filmed by Alan Badoev. "Ty ve meni ye" peaked at 105 of the TopHit radio charts.

In March 2018, The Legend of Carpathians (Ukrainian: Легенда Карпат, romanized: Lehenda Karpat) was premiered at the 70th Cannes Film Festival. In this film, Yaremchuk portrayed Marichka, the lover of folklore hero Oleksa Dovbush.

=== 2018–present: hiatus ===
In early 2018, Yaremchuk's manager announced that the singer is going on an indefinite hiatus.

"I will still sing, but I am taking a time-out and I am closing the project Mariya Yaremchuk. Consciously, now understanding myself. I don't see the point in singing the music I sang, in the name I used to wear. It's hard to leave a fortune. Eurovision, all those clips are a lot. It's hard to say "bye-bye" to everything and destroy everything. I was afraid. I had been taking the move for a whole year – it's not impulsive, it's not an emotion. This is a conscious decision."

— Mariya Yaremchuk, 2018

Since then, she did not release any material, nor appeared at concerts and on television programmes. Yaremchuk stopped updating her social media pages in May 2018, but returned shortly in June 2020 to post two Instagram posts to promote Netflix's film Eurovision Song Contest: The Story of Fire Saga, which was partially inspired by her Eurovision 2014 stage performance.

In 2023, she was part of the interval act 'Music Unites Generations' during the second semi-final of the Eurovision Song Contest 2023 alongside Zlata Dziunka and Otoy.

== Private life ==
Yaremchuk states that she belongs to the Hutsul ethnic group. As of 2021, she resides in Lviv.

== Discography ==
Mariia Yaremchuk (2014)

=== Singles ===
Title	Year	Peak chart positions		Album
Title	Year	UKR	UK	Album
"So mnoy opyat'" (Со мной опять)	2012	—	—	—N/a
"Imagine"	2012	—	—	—N/a
"Tebe ya znaydu" (Тебе я знайду)	2013	—	—	—N/a
"Tick-Tock"	2014	—	190	—N/a
"Do tebe" (До тебе)	2016	—	—	—N/a
"Ty v meni ye" (Ти в мені є)	2017	—	—	—N/a
"Do nestyamy" (До нестями)	2017	—	—	—N/a
"Nazavzhdy" (Назавжди)	2018	—	—	—N/a
"Sword and shield" (Щит і меч)	2023	—	—	
"—" denotes a single that did not chart.

== Notes ==
Awards and achievements
Preceded by Zlata Ognevich with "Gravity"	Ukraine in the Eurovision Song Contest; 2014	Succeeded by Jamala with "1944"
