= New Wave 2012 =

- Season 2012
- Presented by: Valeria Kudryavtseva; Sergey Lazarev; Aleksandr Revva; Vera Brezhneva; Ivan Dorn; Anna Semenovich; Potap; Verka Serduchka
- Winner: (Russia) Niloo
- Runner-up: (Italy) Costanzo Del Pinto
- Finals venue: (Latvia) Dzintari, Jūrmala

Release
- Original network: (Latvia) LNT, TV5; (Russia) RTR Planeta; (Ukraine) TRK Ukrayina
- Original release: 24 July – 29 July 2012

11th International contest of young performers New wave was held from 24 to 29 July 2012 in the concert hall Dzintari in Jūrmala, Latvia.

== Participants ==
Participant	Country
Suren Arustamyan	Armenia
Aleksandra Bartashevich	Belarus
Costanzo Del Pinto	Italy
Ayala Eligoola	Israel
The Jigits	Kazakhstan
Bek Israilov	Kyrgyzstan
Han Hua	China
W	Russia
IOWA	Russia
Niloo	Russia
Framest	Latvia
Diāna Jasilionite	Lithuania
Los Rumberos	Mexico
Michael Blayze	Nigeria
Cristal	Finland
Mariya Yaremchuk	Ukraine

== Day 1–25 July ==
Nr.	Country	Performer	Song	Points
01	Mexico	Los Rumberos	I Like It (Enrique Iglesias)	83
02	Kyrgyzstan	Bek Israilov	Honesty (Billy Joel)	85
03	Finland	Cristal	If I ain’t got you (Alicia Keys)	80
04	Russia	Niloo	Unfaithful (Rihanna)	93
05	Armenia	Suren Arustamyan	Change the world (Eric Clapton)	92
06	Kazakhstan	The Jigits	September (Earth, Wind & Fire)	94
07	Ukraine	Mariya Yaremchuk	Homeless (Leona Lewis)	97
08	Lithuania	Diāna Jasilionite	Killing Me Softly (The Fugees)	87
09	Latvia	Framest	Moanin' (Art Blakey and «Jazz Messengers»)	96
10	China	Han Hua	A New Day Has Come (Celine Dion)	81
11	Nigeria	Michael Blayze	Don't Worry Be Happy (Bobby McFerrin)	81
12	Russia	IOWA	Paparazzi (Lady Gaga)	85
13	Israel	Ayala Eligoola	Hallelujah (Jeff Buckley)	95
14	Belarus	Aleksandra Bartashevich	No Ordinary Love (Sade)	94
15	Russia	W	I want you back (Michael Jackson)	89
16	Italy	Costanzo Del Pinto	Thank You For Loving Me (Bon Jovi)	96

== Day 2–26 July ==
Nr.	Country	Performer	Song	Points
01	China	Han Hua	Mage Ama	86
02	Belarus	Aleksandra Bartashevich	Ya ne veryu tvoim glazam (Maxim Fadeev)	91
03	Ukraine	Maria Yaremchuk	Teche voda (Sofia Rotaru)	95
04	Finland	Cristal	Rolling in the Deep (Adele)	83
05	Italy	Costanzo Del Pinto	L’italiano (Toto Cutugno)	97
06	Israel	Ayala Eligoola	One Night Only (Beyoncé)	90
07	Latvia	Framest	Podberu muzyku (Raimonds Pauls)	94
08	Russia	IOWA	Sneg (Nikolai Noskov)	93
09	Lithuania	Diāna Jasilionite	Love is blind (Donny Montell)	88
10	Armenia	Suren Arustamyan	Moya lyubov' tebe (Avet Barsegyan)	88
11	Mexico	Los Rumberos	Bamboleo (Nicolas Reyes)	88
12	Russia	Niloo	Samaya luchshaya (Slivki)	95
13	Kazakhstan	The Jigits	Uletayu (A-Studio)	95
14	Nigeria	Michael Blayze	All I do (Stevie Wonder)	84
15	Kyrgyzstan	Bek Israilov	Bozhe, kakoy pustyak (Aleksandr Ivanov)	88
16	Russia	W	Predstav' sebe (Aleksandr Abdulov)	88

== Day 3–28 July ==
Nr.	Country	Performer	Song	Points
01	Kyrgyzstan	Bek Israilov	Moya lyubov'	88
02	Nigeria	Michael Blayze	Never Say Never	76
03	Ukraine	Mariya Yaremchuk	Vesna	88
04	Russia	Niloo	Ola-ola	96
05	Finland	Cristal	He doesn't know	80
06	Italy	Costanzo Del Pinto	Se vuoi	89
07	Israel	Ayala Eligoola	How it most a beautiful	83
08	Kazakhstan	The Jigits	Vso lyubov'	88
09	Mexico	Los Rumberos	Mami ti siento do lor	84
10	Belarus	Aleksandra Bartashevich	Ty leti	89
11	Latvia	Framest	Na ulitse goroda roz	87
12	Russia	IOWA	Mama	97
13	Russia	W	Na samom dele	82
14	Armenia	Suren Arustamyan	Next to you	88
15	China	Han Hua	To get a love and make me stay	75
16	Lithuania	Diāna Jasilionite	Endless melody	85

== Results ==
Country	Performer	Total points	Place
Russia	Niloo	284	1
Italy	Costanzo Del Pinto	282	2
Ukraine	Mariya Yaremchuk	280	3
Latvia	Framest	277	4-5
Kazakhstan	The Jigits	277	4-5
Russia	IOWA	275	6
Belarus	Aleksandra Bartashevich	274	7
Israel	Ayala Eligoola	268	8-9
Armenia	Suren Arustamyan	268	8-9
Kyrgyzstan	Bek Israilov	262	10
Lithuania	Diāna Jasilionite	260	11
Russia	W	259	12
Mexico	Los Rumberos	255	13
Finland	Cristal	243	14
China	Han Hua	242	15
Nigeria	Michael Blayze	241	16

== Presenters ==
- Valeria Kudryavtseva
- Sergey Lazarev
- Aleksandr Revva
- Vera Brezhneva
- Ivan Dorn
- Anna Semenovich
- Sergey Zverev
- Volodymyr Zelenskyy
- Elizaveta Boyarskaya
- Valery Meladze
- Verka Serduchka
- Potap

== The contest program ==
- 24 July — Grandiose gala concert dedicated to the opening of the contest
- 25 July — The first day of the contest — The day of the world-wide hit
- 26 July — The second day of the contest — The hit of the native country
- 27 July — Traditional beach soccer tournament «New Wave Cup» between the teams of show business stars and contestants «New Wave».
- 27 July — Creative evening of Konstantin Meladze
- 27 July — Night discotheque «Muz-TV» — Special guest — Timati.
- 28 July — Tennis tournament between the stars of the «New Wave» and professionals
- 28 July — The third day of the contest — Premiere Day — Special guest — Lara Fabian.
- 29 July — Gala concert dedicated to the closing of the contest, award ceremony — Special guests — Nelly Furtado and Sumi Jo.

== Jury ==
- Raimonds Pauls
- Igor Krutoy
- Valeriya
- Laima Vaikule
- Valery Meladze
- Konstantin Meladze
- Igor Nikolayev
- Igor Matviyenko
- Leonid Agutin
- Yuri Antonov
- Maxim Fadeev

== Guest artists ==
At the 2012 New Wave festival, British singer Tom Jones performed at the opening ceremony. Rick Astley took the stage on the World Hit Day. The closing ceremony featured performances by Korean opera singer and 1992 Grammy Award winner Sumi Jo, alongside Canadian singer Nelly Furtado.
