= Zlata Ognevich =

Ukrainian singer and former politician

Zlata Ognevich Злата Оґнєвіч
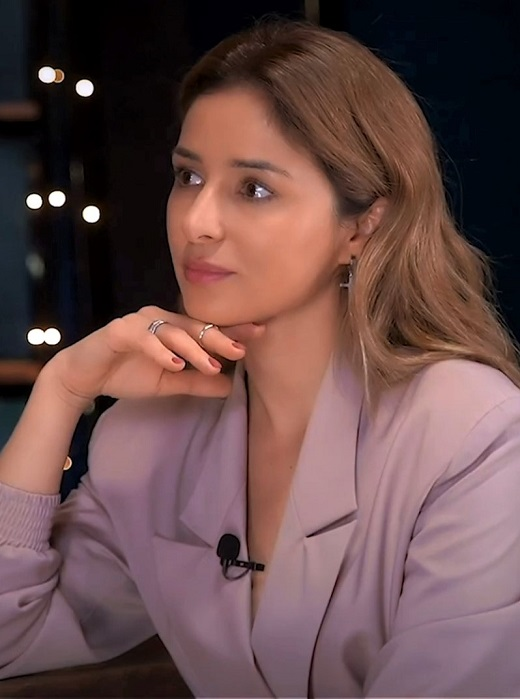
- Ognevich in 2020

Background information
- Born: Inna Leonidivna Bordiuh; 12 January 1986 (age 40); Kryvyi Rih, Ukrainian SSR, USSR
- Genres: Pop, crossover
- Occupations: singer; actor
- Instrument: Vocals. Lyric-dramatic soprano
- Years active: 2010–present
- Label: Best Music
- Awards: Золота Жар-птиця, YUNA, Megogo, МУЗВАР
- Website: zlatao.com

People's Deputy of Ukraine

8th convocation
- In office 27 November 2014 – 10 November 2015
- Constituency: Radical Party, No.4

Zlata Leonidivna Ognevich (Ukrainian: Злата Леонідівна Оґнєвіч, romanized: Zlata Leonidivna Ognievich; born Inna Leonidivna Bordiuh, Інна Леонідівна Бордюг on 12 January 1986) is a Ukrainian singer and former politician. She represented Ukraine in the Eurovision Song Contest 2013 in Malmö with the song "Gravity", placing third. Ognevich previously attempted to represent Ukraine at the contest in 2010 and 2011.

In 2014, Ognevich was elected to the Verkhovna Rada for the Radical Party using her birth name Inna Bordiuh. She resigned from parliament after one year, citing her opposition to the corruption she had witnessed. She has been vocal in her support for Ukrainian forces during the pro-Russian unrest in Ukraine, and announced she would not accept Russian citizenship following the annexation of Crimea, where Ognevich was raised.

== Early life ==
According to her birth certificate, Ognevich was born in 1986 in Murmansk, however, she later found Kryvyi Rih to be her actual place of birth; she has Italian ancestors on her mother's side and Serbian on her father's side. She grew up in the Crimean city of Sudak. (Note: Both Russia and Ukraine were part of the Soviet Union since 1920 till Ukraine declared its independence from the Soviet Union on 24 August 1991.) At age 18, Ognevich moved to Kyiv to pursue a higher music education. Ognevich is a graduate of Kyiv's Rheingold M. Glière Music College. During her third year at Rheingold, she began working with live bands and did her own promotional work.

Ognevich has said she has lived in "many cities and countries".

== Musical career ==
Ognevich is a soloist of the Ensemble of Song and Dance of the Ukrainian Armed Forces.

Ognevich made her first attempt to enter the Eurovision Song Contest in 2010 with the song "Tiny Island", which finished fifth with 30 points.

In 2011, she made her second unsuccessful attempt to represent Ukraine in the contest. This time the song was in the Ukrainian language. Her song was "The Kukushka" which finished second. Following complaints from viewers about the voting procedure in that years final, a new final was to be held on 3 March 2011. However, after Jamala and Ognevich withdrew from this new final in the days before it was scheduled to be held, Mika Newton became the artist to represent Ukraine.

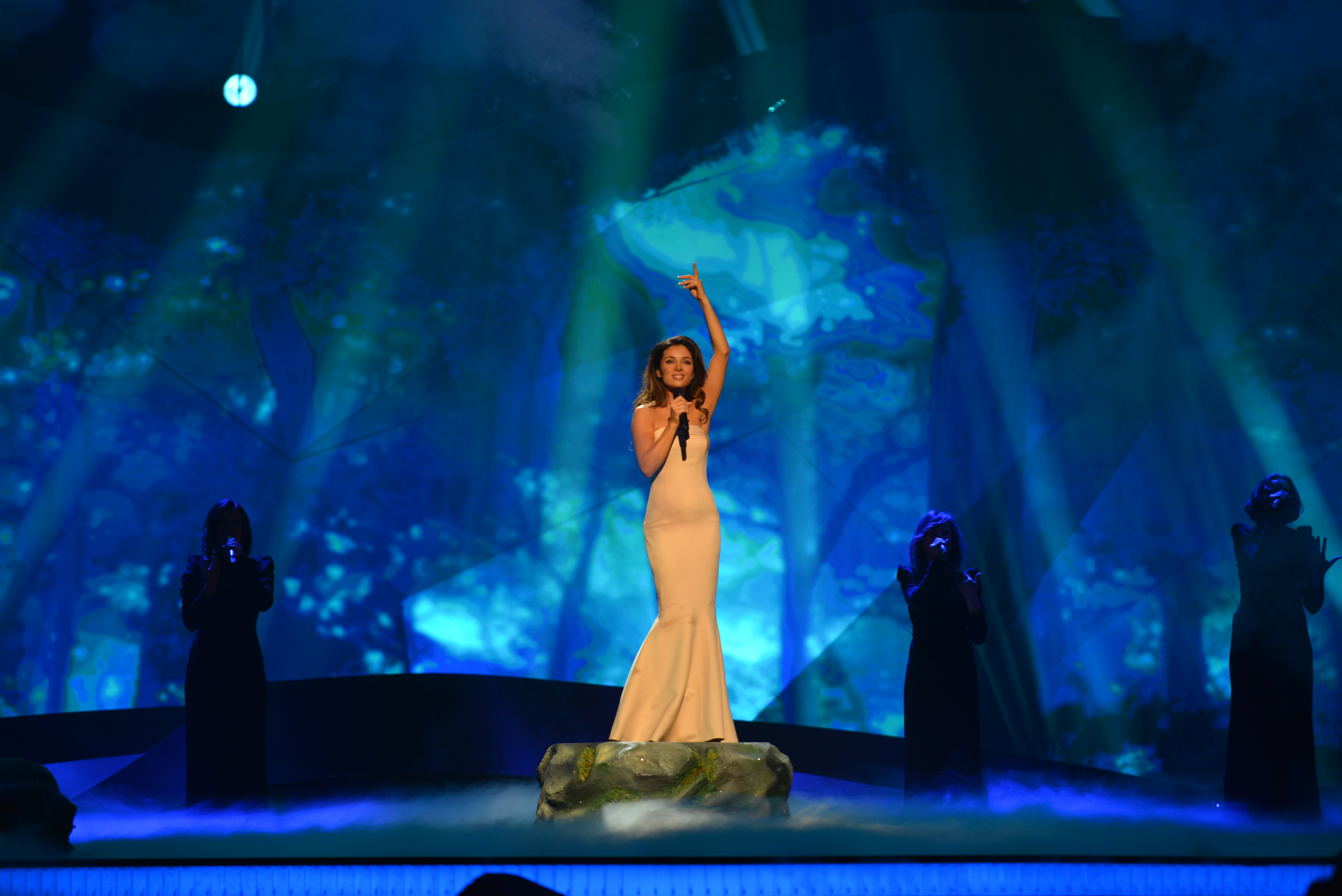
Zlata Ognevich in the Eurovision Song Contest 2013

On 23 December 2012, Ognevich made her third attempt to represent Ukraine at the Eurovision Song Contest, by entering the Ukrainian national selection Evrobachennya 2013 – Natsionalyni vidbir with the song "Gravity". After scoring maximum points from both the jury and televote, Ognevich won the right to represent Ukraine at the Eurovision Song Contest 2013 in Malmö, Sweden. At the competition, Ukraine qualified from the first semi-final on 14 May 2013, placing third in a field of 16 songs and scoring 140 points. In the final, Ognevich and "Gravity" placed third, scoring 214 points and receiving 12 points from Armenia, Azerbaijan, Belarus, Croatia and Moldova.

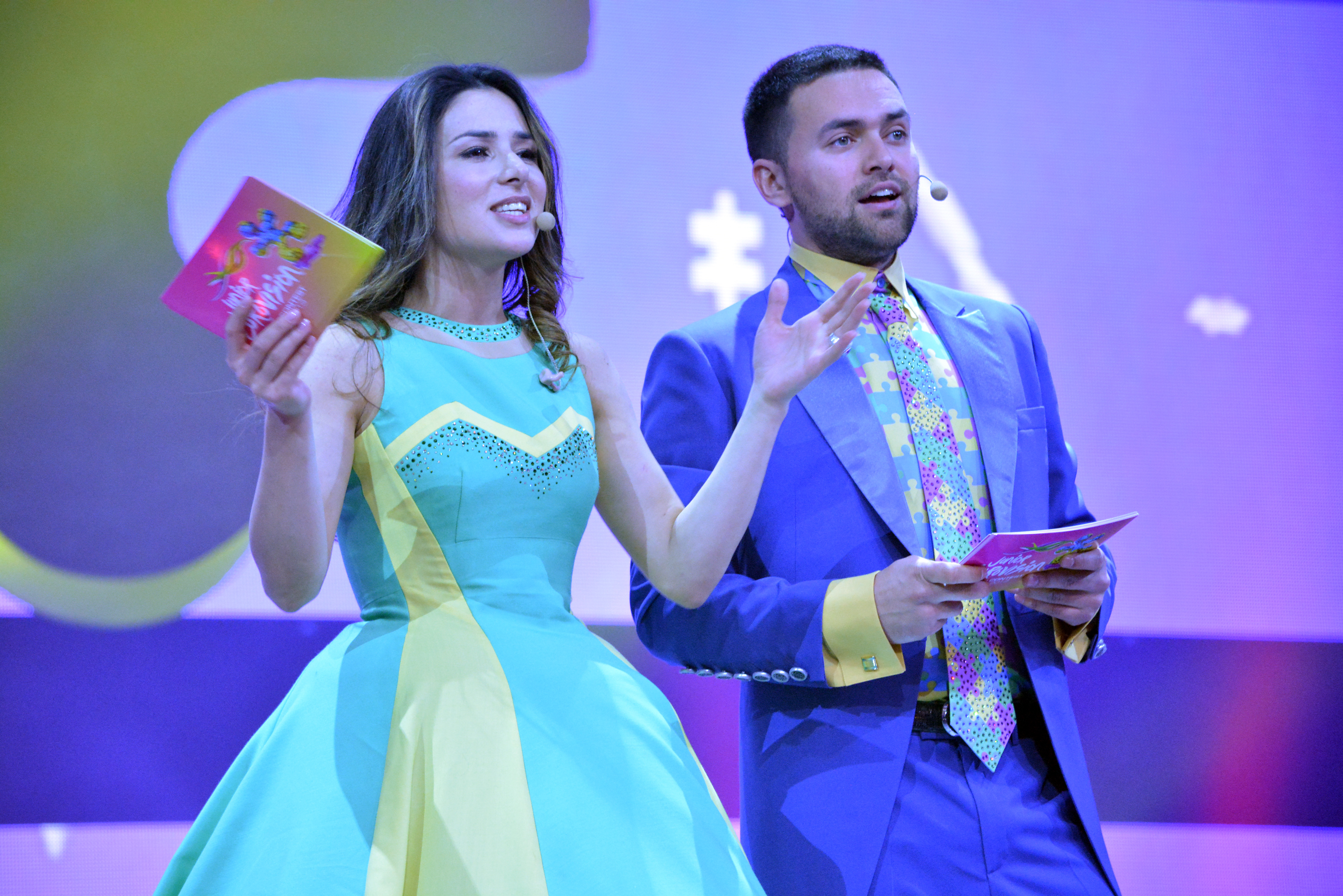
Ognevich and Timur Miroshnychenko hosting the 2013 Junior Eurovision Song Contest in Kyiv

Ognevich hosted the Junior Eurovision Song Contest 2013 on 30 November along with Timur Miroshnychenko. Ognevich announced the voting results from Ukraine during the Eurovision Song Contest 2014. In August 2014, Ognevich released her own version of Ukraine's national anthem "Shche ne vmerla Ukraina".

=== 2017–2018 ===
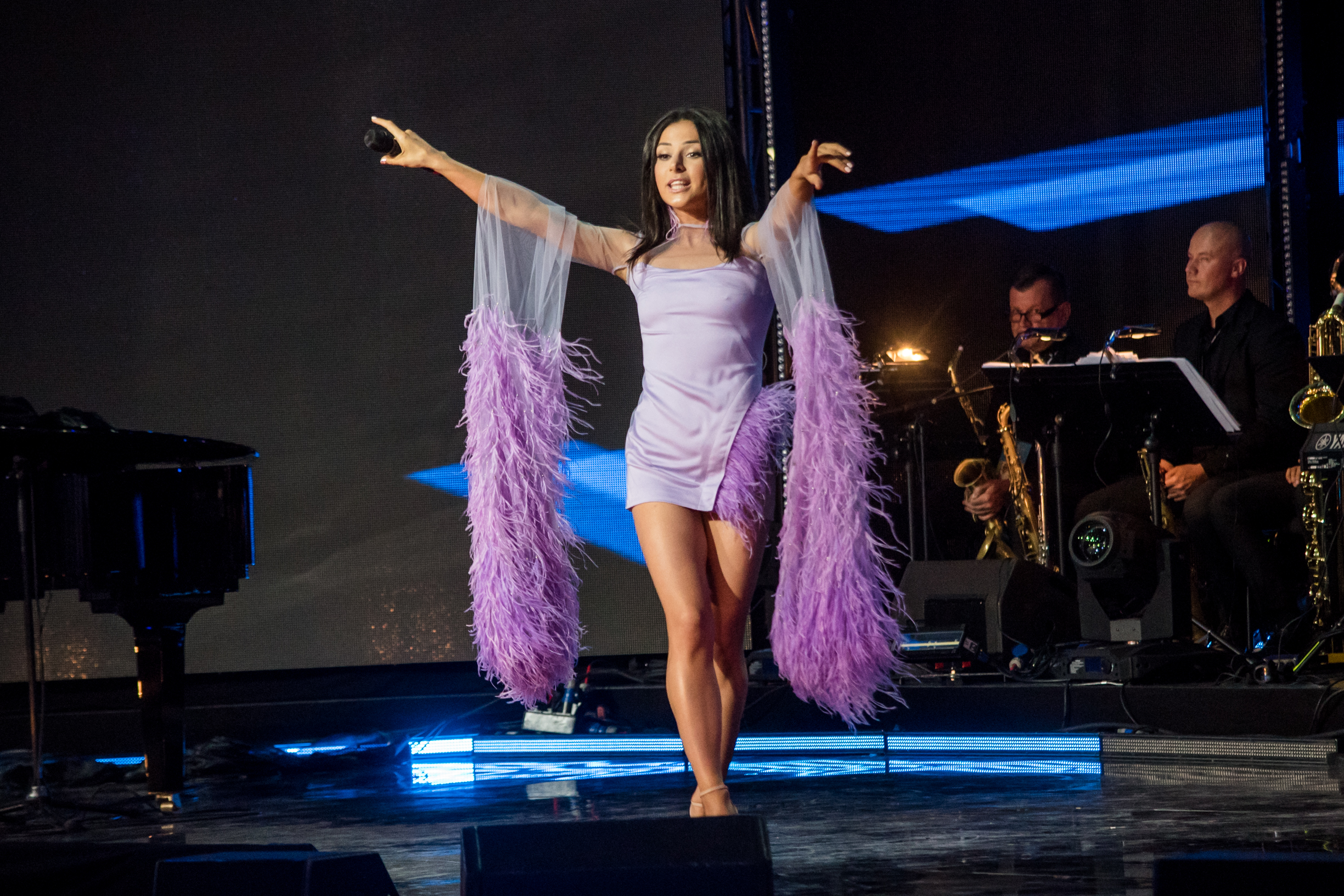
Ognevych at the festival in Jurmala, 2017

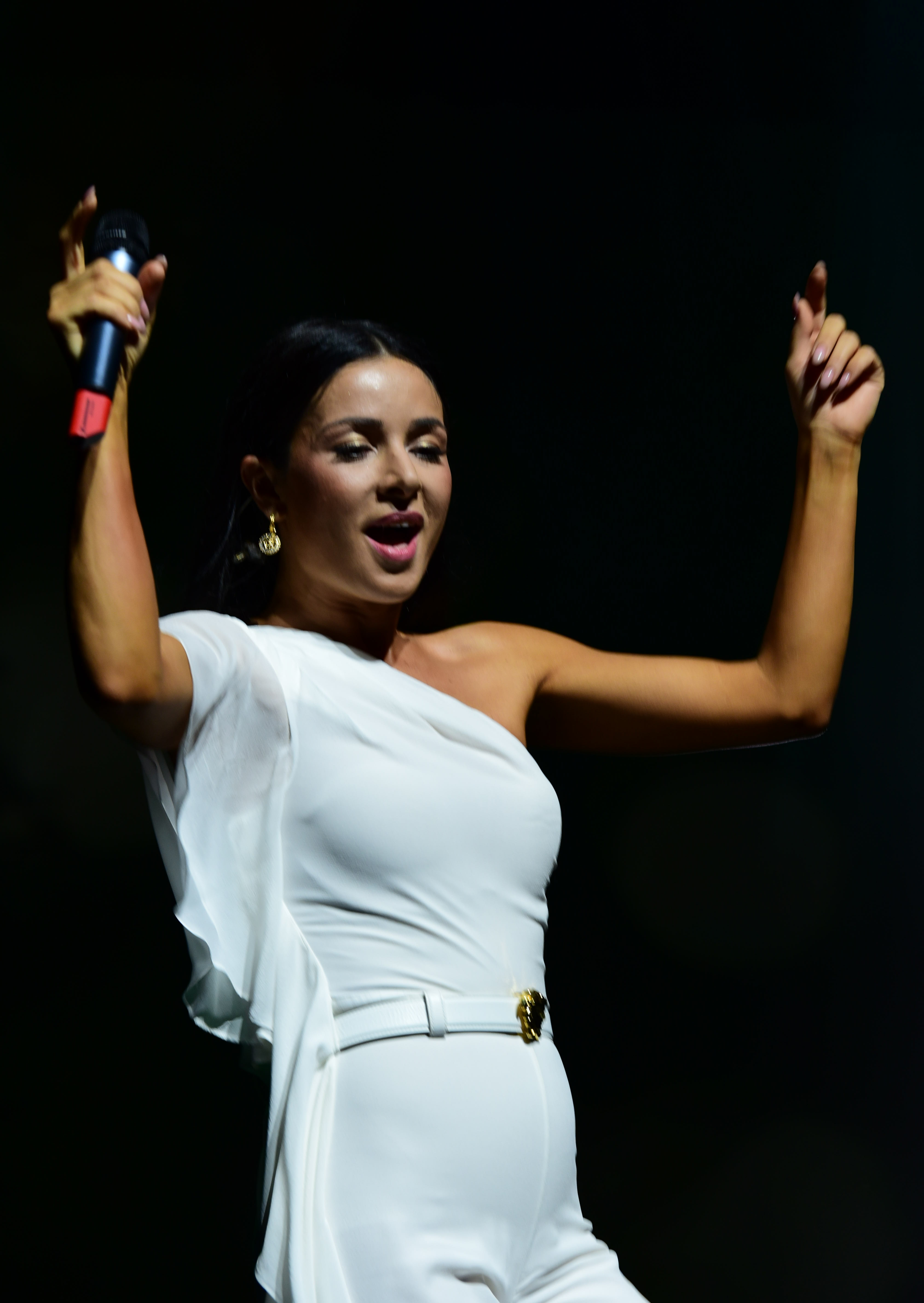
Performance at a beauty pageant in Toronto, 2018

In 2017, Ognevych presented her solo concert programme ‘‘My Story’’ at the National Palace of Arts “Ukraina” in Kyiv. The show was directed by Olena Koliadenko, while the choreographic performances were presented by Freedom Ballet. Due to high demand for tickets, the organisers announced an additional concert date.

On 23 September 2017, she appeared as a special guest performer at a concert by Andrea Bocelli held at the Olympic National Sports Complex in Kyiv.

In late August 2018, Ognevych and professional dancer Dmytro Zhuk became contestants on the Ukrainian television show Dancing with the Stars (Tantsi z zirkamy) broadcast by 1+1. The pair was eliminated during the second live show following the audience vote.

On 18 December 2018, Ognevych released her debut studio album Hrani (Edges), consisting of eight tracks. The album featured collaborations with songwriter and composer Mykhailo Nekrasov on the tracks "Tantsiuvaty", "Do Mene", "Doloni" and "Yedynyi". The song "Spovid" was co-written with Kateryna Rohova and arranged by Constantine and Yevhen Filatov. "Chekai" was written by Oleksandr Lozovskyi and arranged by Vadym Lysytsia, while "Syla" was produced by Dynamika Music together with Kyrylo Matiushenko. The album also included a contemporary arrangement of the Ukrainian folk song "Chom Ty Ne Pryishov".

In 2018, Ognevych performed as a special guest at a concert by Montserrat Caballé at the National Palace of Arts “Ukraina” in Kyiv. According to Ognevych, the Spanish soprano personally invited her to participate in the programme. During the concert, the singers performed a duet, and Ognevych also presented several solo compositions. In later interviews, she described the collaboration with Caballé as an important milestone in her artistic career that influenced her professional approach to vocal performance.

=== 2019–2020 ===
On 23 May 2019, Ognevych released the music video for the song "Solodka Kara" ("Sweet Punishment"), which she had previously presented on the television programme Evening of Premieres with Kateryna Osadcha.

In 2019, Ognevych released the studio album Syla Pokolin (The Strength of Generations). The record featured Ukrainian folk songs in contemporary arrangements, including "Shchedryk", "Silent Night", and "Chom Ty Ne Pryishov". The album was produced by Mykhailo Nekrasov. Music critics noted its combination of traditional folk material with contemporary pop music.

=== 2021–2022 ===
In 2021, Ognevych became the face of a marketing campaign for the Ukrainian jewelry brand ‘‘Zolota Kraina’’.

On 10 April 2021, the character Sun won the second season of the Ukrainian television show ‘‘The Masked Singer Ukraine’’ (’‘Maska’’). The performer behind the costume was revealed to be Ognevych.

Later that year, she became the lead participant in the second season of the reality television series ‘‘The Bachelorette Ukraine’’ (’‘Kholostiachka’’) on STB. In the finale, she chose entrepreneur Andrii Zadvornyi; however, the couple announced their separation shortly after filming concluded.

Following the Russian invasion of Ukraine in 2022, Ognevych remained in Kyiv and became involved in volunteer activities. She participated in charity initiatives, performed at concerts supporting Ukraine, and assisted territorial defence units. Since the first months of the war, she has performed for Ukrainian service members in military hospitals, rehabilitation centres, and military bases. She also joined charity concert tours across Europe and the United States to raise funds for the Armed Forces of Ukraine and humanitarian aid projects.

=== 2023–2024 ===
At the final of the Eurovision Song Contest 2023 on 13 May 2023, Ognevich was the spokesperson for the Ukrainian national jury, announcing that its twelve points had been awarded to Sweden. In 2023, Ognevych and singer SHUMEI released the duet single "Bureviiamy". The song was written by Gerald Estrada, Oleh Shumei and Ognevych. It reached high positions on Ukrainian streaming charts and won several domestic music awards, including ‘‘Duet of the Year’’ at the MEGOGO Music Awards.

Later that year, she performed the solo concert ‘‘Viddaiu’’ at the International Center of Culture and Arts in Kyiv, marking the fifteenth anniversary of her artistic career. The programme was accompanied by an instrumental band and a string orchestra.

In 2024, Ognevych released the extended play Viddaiu, consisting of five tracks. The project was produced in collaboration with sound producers Serhii Ranov and Yevhen Tryplov.

That same year, her song "Ptashka" became the official soundtrack for the Ukrainian feature film Konotop Witch. Ognevych dedicated the song to Ukrainian women. The official music video combined scenes featuring the singer with footage from the film.

In December 2024, she held her annual winter solo concert at the International Center of Culture and Arts in Kyiv.

Also in 2024, Ognevych made her debut as a voice actress, providing the Ukrainian voice of Glinda in the musical film Wicked. In the original version, the character was portrayed by Ariana Grande. Ognevych voiced both the spoken dialogue and all of the character’s musical performances.

=== 2025–present ===
In 2025, Ognevych released the studio album Tut i Zaraz (Here and Now), featuring the songs "Vilna", "Na Nashomu Poversi", and updated versions of several previously released tracks. The album was produced by Vadym Lysytsia and Serhii Ranov and included duet recordings with YATSUTA and CHEEV.

Later that year, she released the compilation album The Best, which included her best-known songs as well as tracks that had not previously been available on digital streaming platforms, including "Zapaly Vohon", "Za Litom Za Vesnoiu", "Tantsiuvaty", "Bureviiamy", "Ptashka", and the duet "Preriia" with Artem Pivovarov.

On 30 January 2026, Ognevych was selected as a member of the jury for Ukraine’s national selection for the Eurovision Song Contest 2026.

In February 2026, she officially released the English-language single "One Day". An earlier version of the song had been performed during Ukraine’s national selection for the Eurovision Song Contest in 2012. The new arrangement was produced in collaboration with Ukrainian and American musicians and incorporated elements of gospel music and African-American backing vocals.

== Political career ==
In the 2014 Ukrainian parliamentary election on 26 October, Ognevich was a candidate (as a non-partisan candidate she placed 4th on the party list) of Radical Party. According to Radical Party leader Oleh Lyashko, Ognevich was on the party list because "I understand that in the imagination of people a parliamentarian is jowly, paunchy, old, sick and stupid. And I want there to be young, smart, beautiful people in Parliament". In the election, her party won twenty two seats and thus Ognevich was elected into parliament. In parliament, she focused on cultural and copyright issues. Ognevich was present at 57% of all parliamentary sessions during her tenure in parliament.

On 10 November 2015, Ognevich submitted a letter of resignation to parliament. In her resignation speech to parliament on the same day, she stated; "Now I see that when there is no culture it’s easier to rule and manipulate people. That’s why in these circumstances, as cultural activist, I’m not helpful to this parliament…". In the speech, she also accused her former colleagues of serving lobbyist interests and not the general public.

== Personal life ==
Five months after the March 2014 annexation of Crimea by Russia, (Note: Crimea is currently under dispute by Russia and Ukraine.) Ognevich called the annexation "a very painful tragedy" and stated that her parents, who were still living in Crimea, would not obtain Russian citizenship.

During the 2014 pro-Russian conflict in Ukraine Ognevich and fellow Ukrainian singer Anastasia Prikhodko raised money for the 72nd Guards Mechanized Brigade.

== Discography ==
Year	Album
2018	Грані
2019	Сила поколінь
2020	Богиня
2024	Віддаю
2024	Тиха ніч
2025	The Best
2025	Тут і зараз

=== Singles ===
Year	Title
2010	«Остров любви» (Russian)
2010	«Ангелы» (Russian)
2010	«Пристрасть»
2010	«Зозуля»
2011	«Japan» (English)
2011	«Далеко»
2011	«За лісами горами»
2011	«My Bunny» (English)
2012	«Запали вогонь»
2013	«Gravity»
2013	«Kiss» (with DJ Shamshudinov) (English)
2014	«Pray for Ukraine» (English)
2014	«Ice & Fire Kiss» (with Eldar Gasimov)
2015	«Моя мелодія»
2016	«Новорічне Диско»
2017	«За літом весною»
2017	«Танцювати»
2019	«Солодка кара»
2019	«Богиня»
2019	«Щедрик»
2019	«Ой люлі»
2019	«Причиста Діва»
2019	«То є ніченька»
2019	«Музиченьки»
2019	«Мале Дитя»
2019	«Тиха ніч»
2019	«Котику»
2019	«Чом ти не прийшов»
2020	«Ти обіцяв»
2020	«Беги»
2020	«Гола правда»
2020	«Bogini»
2020	«Океан»
2020	«Обіцяй мені»
2020	«Погляд»
2021	«Щедрик»
2021	«Я твоя Єдина»
2021	«Always»
2021	«Мій назавжди»
2021	«Клинок»
2021	«Що б там не сталося»
2022	«До весни»
2022	«За лісами горами»
2022	«Світло»
2022	«Лелека»
2022	«Як мені бути»
2023	«Буревіями»
2023	«Янгол»
2023	«Народжені вільними»
2023	«Полюбила»
2023	«Святий Миколай»
2024	«Віддаю»
2024	«Все невипадково»
2024	«Не твоя»
2024	«Троянда»
2024	«Обманув, навішав»
2024	«Співаю (ла-ла-ла)»
2024	«Кохаю»
2024	«Пташка»
2024	«Без тебе»
2024	«Birdie»
2024	«Мости»
2024	«Тиха ніч»
2024	«Маланка»
2024	«Ой сивая та і зозуленька»
2024	«Зорі»
2025	«Відпусти його»
2025	«Мам»
2025	«Запали вогонь (2025 Version)»
2025	«Вільна»
2025	«Обійми-обійми»
2025	«Не чіпляй»
2025	«Пристрасть»
2025	«Клянусь»
2025	«Саме Той»
2025	«На нашому поверсі»
2026	«Беньки-Бубеньки»
2026	«ONE DAY»
2026	«Королева Драми»

== Videography ==
Year	Song	Director	Album
2010	Oстров любви	J. Veiland	Non-album single
2010	Ангелы	J. Veiland	Non-album single
2010	Пристрасть	Katya Tsaryk	Non-album single
2010	Kiss	Viktoriya Nekrasova	Non-album single
2010	Зозуля	Oleh Stepchenko	Non-album single
2011	Далеко	Didier Daubich; Viktoriya Nekrasova	Non-album single
2011	Пристрасть	Katya Tsaryk	Non-album single
2013	Gravity	Najma Bhatti	Non-album single
2015	Кружева	Yevhen Tymokhin	Non-album single
2016	Новорічне диско	Mykhailo Nekrasov	Non-album single
2017	За літом, за весною	Yurii Morozov	Non-album single
2017	Танцювати	Kostiantyn Hordiienko	Grani
2018	Do мене	Kostiantyn Hordiienko	Grani
2018	Doloni	Kostiantyn Hordiienko	Grani
2019	Солодка кара	Denys Manokha; Maksym Shelkovnykov	Non-album single
2019	Чом ти не прийшов	Maksym Litvinov	Syla Pokolin
2020	Ти обіцяв	Maksym Litvinov	Bohynia
2020	Богиня	Maksym Litvinov	Bohynia
2020	Беги	Val Gonskiy	Bohynia
2020	Гола правда	Val Gonskiy	Bohynia
2020	Океан	Val Gonskiy	Bohynia
2020	Обіцяй мені	Herman Nenov	Non-album single
2021	Мій назавжди	Herman Nenov	Non-album single
2021	Клинок	Olena Zakharchuk	Non-album single
2021	Що б там не сталося	Iryna Hromozda	Non-album single
2021	Щедрик		Non-album single
2022	За лісами горами	Val Gonskiy	Non-album single
2022	Світло	Anton Shatohin	Non-album single
2022	Лелека	Anton Shatohin	Non-album single
2022	Як мені бути	Sasha Bagaziy	Non-album single
2023	Янгол	Sasha Bagaziy	Non-album single
2023	Полюбила	Lera Mazur	Viddaiu
2023	Віддаю	Max Salo	Viddaiu
2024	Все невипадково	Anton Shatohin	Viddaiu
2024	Кохаю	Max Salo	Non-album single
2024	Пташка	Max Salo	Non-album single
2024	Мости	Lera Mazur	Non-album single
2024	Ой сивая та і зозуленька	Lera Mazur	Tykha Nich
2025	Відпусти його	Oleksandr Hirchenko	Tut i zaraz
2025	Запали вогонь	Lera Mazur	Non-album single
2025	Вільна	Lera Mazur	Tut i zaraz
2025	Обійми-обійми	Oleksandr Kriger	Tut i zaraz
2025	Не чіпляй	Oleksandr Kriger	Tut i zaraz
2025	На нашому поверсі	Oleksandr Kriger	Tut i zaraz
2026	ONE DAY	Sasha Bagaziy	Non-album single
2026	Беньки-бубеньки	ZLATA OGNEVICH, Yulia Yurina	Non-album single
2026	Королева драми	Dasha Shi	Non-album single

== Filmography ==
Year	Type	Ukrainian title	Original title	Role
2016	animated film	Zootopiaг	Zootopia	Gazelle (Ukrainian dubbing)
2024	animated film	Wicked: Чародійка	Wicked	Glinda (Ukrainian dubbing)
2024	animated film	Christmas. You Are Not Alone	—	Bila — ruler
2025	animated film	Wicked: Чародійка. Part 2	Wicked: Part Two	Glinda (Ukrainian dubbing)

== Awards and nominations ==
Year	Award	Nomination	Result	Notes	Ref
2014	YUNA	Найкраща пісня	Nominated	"Pray For Ukraine"	
2017	M1 Music Awards	Найкраща співачка	Nominated		
2017	M1 Music Awards	Червона Рута	Nominated	"Танцювати"	
2017	M1 Music Awards	Найкращий виступ на церемонії	Nominated	"Танцювати"	
2018	Золота Жар-птиця	Dance-хіт	Won	"Танцювати"	
2018	Золота Жар-птиця	Хіт року	Nominated	"Танцювати"	
2018	Золота Жар-птиця	Співачка року	Nominated		
2019	Золота Жар-птиця	Dance-хіт	Nominated	"Долоні"	
2019	Золота Жар-птиця	Кліп року	Nominated	"Долоні"	
2019	Золота Жар-птиця	Співачка року	Won		
2019	Top Hit Music Awards	Найкраща виконавиця на радіо	Won		
2019	M1 Music Awards	Співачка року	Nominated		
2022	YUNA	Найкраща пісня до фільму	Nominated	"Той день" (до х/ф "Пульс")	
2023	Muzvar Awards	Найкраща творча співпраця	Won	"Буревіями" (разом із SHUMEI)	
2023	MEGOGO MUSIC AWARDS	Колаба року	Won		
2024	YUNA	Найкращий дует/колаборація	Won	"Буревіями" (разом із SHUMEI)	
2024	YUNA	Найкраща виконавиця	Nominated		
2024	YUNA	Найкраща пісня	Nominated	"Буревіями"	
2024	YUNA	Найкращий відеокліп	Nominated	"Буревіями"	
2025	YUNA	Найкраща пісня до фільму	Nominated	"Пташка" (до х/ф "Конотопська відьма")	

== Notes ==
Awards and achievements
Preceded by Gaitana with "Be My Guest"	Ukraine in the Eurovision Song Contest; 2013	Succeeded by Mariya Yaremchuk with "Tick-Tock"
Preceded by (Netherlands) Kim-Lian van der Meij and Ewout Genemans	Junior Eurovision Song Contest presenter 2013; With: Timur Miroshnychenko	Succeeded by (Malta) Moira Delia
