= Gravity (Zlata Ognevich song) =

2012 song

Single by Zlata Ognevich
- Released: 11 March 2012
- Genre: Pop
- Length: 3:00
- Label: Universal Records
- Songwriter: Karen Kavaleryan

Zlata Ognevich singles chronology
"The Kukushka" (2011)	"Gravity" (2012)

Eurovision Song Contest 2013 entry
- Country: Ukraine
- Artist: Zlata Ognevich
- Language: English
- Composer: Mikhail Nekrasov
- Lyricist: Karen Kavaleryan

Finals performance
- Semi-final result: 3rd
- Semi-final points: 140
- Final result: 3rd
- Final points: 214

Entry chronology
- ◄ "Be My Guest" (2012)
- "Tick-Tock" (2014) ►

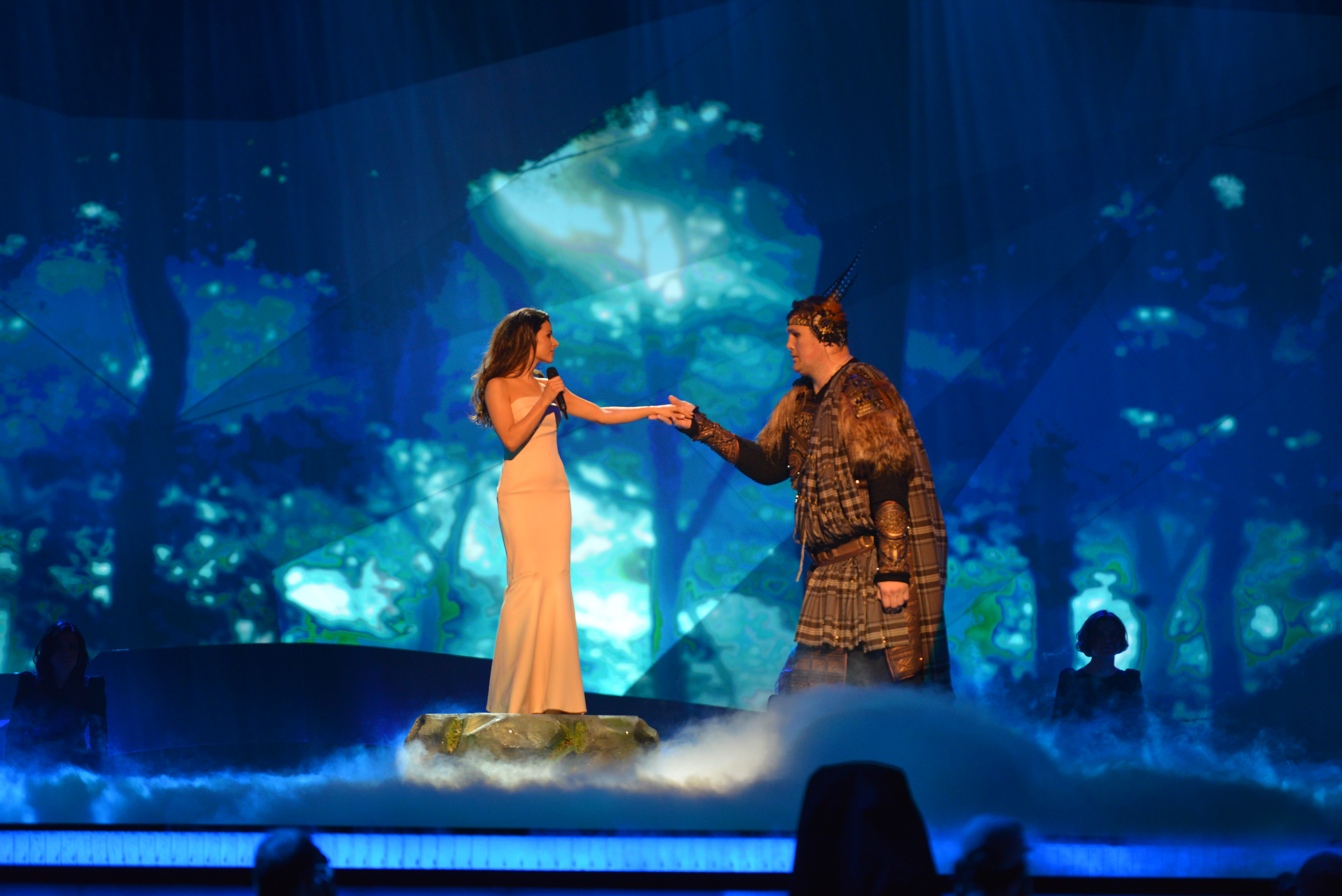
Zlata Ognevich representing Ukraine with the song "Gravity" during the first dress rehearsal of the first semi final of the Eurovision Song Contest

"Gravity" is a song by Ukrainian singer Zlata Ognevich. The song was written by Karen Kavaleryan, and it was composed by Mikhail Nekrasov. The song represented Ukraine in the Eurovision Song Contest 2013 which was hosted in Malmö, Sweden and came in third place with 214 points.

== Eurovision ==
In 23 December 2012, Ognevich participated with the song in the Ukrainian national final for Eurovision 2013, Evrobachennya 2013 - Natsionalyni vidbir. The song came in first place with 40 points, thus set to represent Ukraine in the contest.

At the competition, the song was allocated to the first semi final where it came in third place with 140 points and qualified to the final. In the final, the song placed third in a field of 26 songs with 214 points, receiving 12 points from Armenia, Azerbaijan, Belarus, Croatia and Moldova.

== Charts ==
Chart (2013)	Peak positions
Belgium (Ultratop 50 Flanders)	51
Netherlands (Single Top 100)	50
Ukraine Airplay (TopHit)	4
