= Igor Makarov (ice hockey) =

Russian ice hockey player (born 1987)

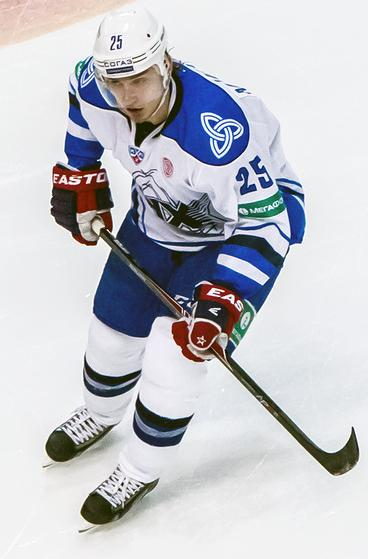
- Born: September 19, 1987 (age 38) Moscow, Russian SFSR, Soviet Union
- Height: 6 ft 1 in (185 cm)
- Weight: 203 lb (92 kg; 14 st 7 lb)
- Position: Right wing
- Shot: Left
- Played for: SKA Saint Petersburg; Dynamo Moscow; Rockford IceHogs; Neftekhimik Nizhnekamsk; CSKA Moscow; Salavat Yulaev Ufa; Avangard Omsk; Sibir Novosibirsk
- NHL draft: 33rd overall, 2006; Chicago Blackhawks
- Playing career: 2003–2020

Igor Sergeyevich Makarov (Russian: Игорь Серге́евич Макаров; born September 19, 1987) is a Russian former professional ice hockey player. He most recently played with HC Sibir Novosibirsk in the Kontinental Hockey League (KHL). Makarov was selected 33rd overall in the second round of the 2006 NHL entry draft by the Chicago Blackhawks.

== Playing career ==
He spent two seasons in the KHL before being signed to a two-year contract by the Chicago Blackhawks in 2010. After one season with American Hockey League affiliate, the Rockford IceHogs, in August 2011, Makarov signed a three-year deal to return with SKA Saint Petersburg. On November 27, 2014, Makarov was traded by SKA to HC Neftekhimik Nizhnekamsk in exchange for a fifth-round pick in 2015.

After two seasons with Salavat Yulaev Ufa, Makarov left as a free agent and returned for a second stint with Dynamo Moscow for the 2018–19 season on September 27, 2018.

== Personal ==
He is the son of Sergei Makarov, who played eight seasons with Krylya Sovetov Moscow during the 1980s.

In 2013, Makarov married Russian TV personality Lera Kudryavtseva. The two have a daughter, Maria, born in 2018.

== Career statistics ==
=== Regular season and playoffs ===
			Regular season					Playoffs
Season	Team	League	GP	G	A	Pts	PIM	GP	G	A	Pts	PIM
2003–04	Krylya Sovetov–2 Moscow	RUS.3	1	0	1	1	0	—	—	—	—	—
2004–05	Krylya Sovetov Moscow	RUS.2	6	2	2	4	4	1	0	0	0	0
2004–05	Krylya Sovetov–2 Moscow	RUS.3	40	13	15	28	44	—	—	—	—	—
2005–06	Krylya Sovetov Moscow	RUS.2	35	9	7	16	20	17	3	4	7	20
2005–06	Krylya Sovetov–2 Moscow	RUS.3	12	5	8	13	14	—	—	—	—	—
2006–07	SKA Saint Petersburg	RSL	49	7	2	9	47	3	1	0	1	2
2007–08	SKA Saint Petersburg	RSL	50	4	11	15	26	9	2	1	3	35
2007–08	SKA–2 Saint Petersburg	RUS.3	5	5	2	7	4	—	—	—	—	—
2008–09	SKA Saint Petersburg	KHL	42	9	8	17	61	3	1	0	1	2
2009–10	SKA Saint Petersburg	KHL	26	4	2	6	28	—	—	—	—	—
2009–10	Dynamo Moscow	KHL	25	1	2	3	33	4	0	0	0	0
2010–11	Rockford IceHogs	AHL	68	11	13	24	49	—	—	—	—	—
2011–12	SKA Saint Petersburg	KHL	42	9	9	18	14	12	2	6	8	10
2012–13	SKA Saint Petersburg	KHL	49	10	17	27	47	6	0	2	2	2
2013–14	SKA Saint Petersburg	KHL	47	9	4	13	61	7	0	0	0	4
2014–15	SKA Saint Petersburg	KHL	17	1	2	3	22	—	—	—	—	—
2014–15	Neftekhimik Nizhnekamsk	KHL	7	2	0	2	6	—	—	—	—	—
2014–15	CSKA Moscow	KHL	20	5	4	9	7	14	1	2	3	23
2015–16	CSKA Moscow	KHL	24	2	1	3	61	8	0	0	0	29
2016–17	Salavat Yulaev Ufa	KHL	32	6	9	15	8	—	—	—	—	—
2017–18	Salavat Yulaev Ufa	KHL	50	6	6	12	52	12	1	2	3	6
2018–19	Dynamo Moscow	KHL	46	5	8	13	20	11	0	1	1	12
2019–20	Avangard Omsk	KHL	24	1	1	2	8	—	—	—	—	—
2019–20	Sibir Novosibirsk	KHL	18	2	1	3	7	5	0	0	0	12
RSL totals			99	11	13	24	73	12	3	1	4	37
KHL totals			469	72	74	146	435	82	5	13	18	100

=== International ===
Year	Team	Event	Result	GP	G	A	Pts	PIM
2004	Russia	WHC17	5th	5	2	3	5	2
2005	Russia	WJC18	5th	6	5	0	5	2
2005	Russia	U18	4th	4	0	2	2	32
2007	Russia	WJC	2nd place, silver medalist(s)	6	2	4	6	2
Junior totals				21	9	9	18	38
