= Tetyana Terekhova =

Ukrainian TV radio presenter and journalist (born 1992)

Tetiana Terekhova
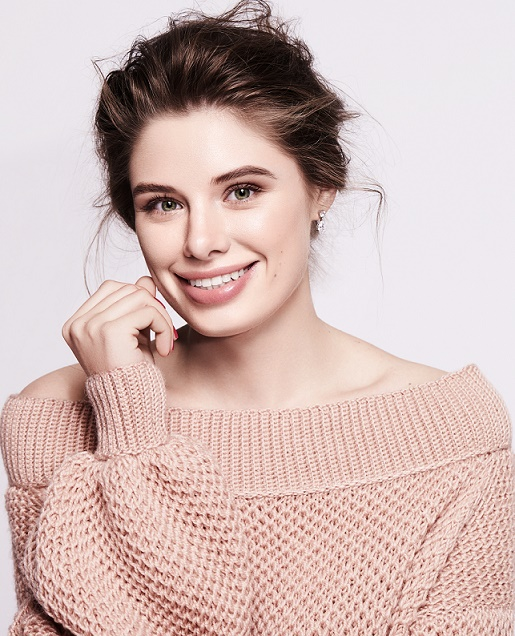
- Born: Tetiana Andriivna Terekhova; 25 January 1992 (age 34); Dnipropetrovsk, Ukraine
- Occupation: Television presenter
- Years active: 2007–present
- Employer: ZIK channel
- Parent: Andrii Derkach

Tetiana Andriivna Terekhova (Ukrainian: Тетяна Андріївна Терехова; born 25 January 1992) is a Ukrainian TV, radio presenter and journalist.

== Childhood and education ==
She was born on January 25, 1992, in Dnipro, Ukraine. In 1994, together with her family moved to Kyiv, studied in the preparatory class of British International School and received education in secondary school No. 128 (Jewish Lyceum). Since 1998, nine years she was professionally ballroom and Latin American dancer. Tetiana and her partner Dmitry Shumigay became multiple champions of Ukraine, champions of open international competitions in Spain, Germany, Slovenia and Poland. She was interested in piano, vocal and painting for over seven years. In 2007, she entered two universities simultaneously: Taras Shevchenko National University of Kyiv and the Institute of International Relations (major "International Business") and the Kyiv National Economic University (major "Accounting and Audit", correspondence course), where in 2013 received a master's degrees.

In 2012 she completed a master's program in the specialty "Specialized journalism" at the USC Annenberg School for Communication and Journalism (USA). In 2013, she received a diploma in "International Law" and today she is a post-graduate student of "International Public Law" Department at the Institute of International Relations of Taras Shevchenko National University of Kyiv. In 2011, she took a specialized course in PR and marketing at the Be First (Kyiv). In 2012, she took a course in acting in the New York Film Academy (Los Angeles, Universal Pictures). In the same year, she received a certificate of passing the course "Business in the Fashion Industry". She speaks English fluently and knows Spanish and French.

== Career ==
Since childhood, she dreamed of becoming an actress and singer, in 2007 (by the end of school) introduced the song "Vypusknoy", written in collaboration with the singer and composer Victoria Vasalatiy. The clip was shot by the filmmaker Alexander Igudin in St. Petersburg. The song became popular not only in Ukraine, but also in Russia (the clip was on the Muz-TV charts and the song was played on various radio stations, including on "Russkoe Radio"). In the same year, Tetiana became a radio presenter at Love Radio in Ukraine.

The first time Tetiana was the author of fashion program "Fact Fashion". In November 2007, the radio station's management suggested Terekhova to conduct her first live broadcast. The air was successful and soon Tetiana began to work as a presenter of leading linear airs and various entertaining music programs, programs upon request "Quadrille" and news. In 2009, she began to work for L'Radio, where she was a presenter of an interview program with show business stars and a weekly program on stars’ life "L Format". Since 2010, she worked for Radio Dacha in linear airs.

In 2010, Tetiana Terekhova began to work on|Radio Era of the leading programs "Forecasts of the Week", "Polylogue", "Lunch Break" and other information and analytical broadcasts.

Since 2009, she started working on television as a special correspondent, later – as a presenter of popular analytical economic program "Credit of Trust" and national events. Since 2010, she has become a presenter of morning news and evening information-analytical program "Totals". Moreover, Tetiana performed as a presenter of the tournament of ballroom and Latin American dances of the international level according to the version of the World Council of Dance, the international Orthodox film festival Pokrov (in 2012 - with Fyodor Bondarchuk, in 2013 - with Andrey Malakhov), a musical television marathon, different concerts and New Year's shows.

In 2011, she played the role of Snow Maiden in the New Year musical "New Year's Night" for UA: First and the TRC "Era".

In the same year, Tetiana began to cooperate with the TV channel UA: First and received a proposal to conduct broadcasts of international importance. From 2011 to 2017 she was the commentator of the Eurovision Song Contest for Ukraine working in tandem with presenters Timur Miroshnychenko between 2011 and 2016 contest and Andriy Horodyskyi during 2017 contest. She also hosted the project "Eurovision Diaries". Since 2014, she has been a national commentator of the opening and closing ceremonies of the Olympic Games. There are series of live broadcasts about the Winter Olympic Games (Sochi, 2014), the Summer Olympic Games (Rio, 2016) and European Games (Baku, 2015) on the account of Tetiana. In August 2016 she became the presenter of the project "Media Center. Rіо 2016" on UA: First together with the sports journalist Slava Varda. From September to December 2016 – the presenter of morning information and analytic program (a joint project of the TV channel NewsOne and TRK "Era"). She works in tandem with journalist and presenter Matvey Ganapolskiy.

In parallel with her career on radio and television, Tetiana develops herself as a documentary filmmaker. In 2013, she released English-language documentaries on presidential elections in the USA and the Los Angeles County Attorney (USA), as well as about the life of Ukrainian singer Mika Newton in the USA. In 2017, she is preparing to present a full-length film about Ukraine's independence.

In 2017, on the UA channel: First, Tetiana Terekhova has become the presenter of the Opening Ceremony, moderator of the participants’ press conferences, commentator of two semifinals and the final of the Eurovision Song Contest, which took place in Ukraine this time.

In addition, on the occasion of Independence Day, in conjunction with NewsOne TV, Tetiana has prepared a special project entitled "Guarantors of Independence" – a series of interviews with Ukrainian presidents Kravchuk and Yushchenko on the main events in the history of independent Ukraine.

In November 2017 became a co-host, along with Vlad Voloshyn and Anton Dovlatov, of the morning infotainment show “Good morning, Country!” on the TV channel “UA:First”.

In February 2018, Tetiana was the official commentator for the opening and closing ceremonies of the Winter Olympics in Pyongchang.

In April 2018, she hosted ‘The Most Successful Woman of the Year’ awards show as part of the ‘Ball of Flowers by Nikolay Tishchenko’.

Tetiana also took part in the Nova Poshta Kyiv Half Marathon charity run in order to raise money for the Tabletochki charity fund.

In May, the 23-59.com.ua and the National Art Museum of Ukraine premiered their joint project ‘When art will speak’. The project was the first audioguide of iconic works by Ukrainian artists, for which Tetiana recorded an audio track.

She hosted the UEFA Champions League Final 2018 Celebration party along with Timur Miroshnichenko in May 2018.

Tetiana Terekhova hosted the 56th Convention of the World Boxing Council in Kyiv along with Volodymyr Ostapchuk.

In October 2018, Tetiana joined the project ‘Svetskiye Chteniya’, where she read an excerpt from the book of Aliona Doletskaya ‘Not Life, But A Fairytale’.

== Awards ==
In 2011, she received an award from the State Television and Radio Broadcasting Committee of Ukraine "For assistance in developing a free and democratic national information environment". She is recorded in the Guinness World Records in 2012, as the presenter of the longest musical telethon] of a national song in the world. The marathon lasted 6 days (110 hours) and was broadcast on the UA: First and TRC "Era".

== Special projects ==
In 2013, she founded the all-Ukrainian student platform Studway. Today it includes an online publication on education and student life], a weekly program "Studway" on Radio "Era", as well as an annual award for talented young people Studway Awards. The project's goal is to help young people to live more brightly and comfortably, find motivation, plan their professional development and go on trips.

Moreover, special for Studway Tetiana Terekhova conducted a series of interviews with "Top Education Management" with key persons of Ukrainian education system, namely, Inna Sovsun, Oleg Derevyanko, Viktor Ognevyuk, Mikhail Zgurovskiy, Ekaterina Amosova, Igor Likarchuk], Andrey Meleshevich, Valeriy Kopiyka.

In May 2017, she has become a participant] of the "Alley of Dreams" – an entertainment and educational project with the support of IOM, USAID, the Embassy of Canada to Ukraine on the Children's Day, which goal was to draw attention to the need for social protection of children.

In September of the same year, she has become the speaker of "All-Ukrainian Volunteer School Lesson"] from Ukrainian Volunteer Service with the support of the Ministry of Education and Science of Ukraine.

== Political career ==
In September 2011, she became a member of the European Party of Ukraine. since 2016 – Member of the Party's Board. In May 2014 ran for local elections to the Kyiv City Council on the lists of the EPU.

== Family ==
Her husband is Ivan Lytvyn, the son of Ukrainian politician Volodymyr Lytvyn. The couple have a daughter Polina and a son Volodymyr.
