= Ukraine in the Eurovision Song Contest 2012 =

- Eurovision Song Contest 2012
- Participating broadcaster: National Television Company of Ukraine (NTU)
- Country: Ukraine
- Selection process: Yevrobachennia 2012 – Natsionalnyi vidbir
- Selection date: 18 February 2012

Competing entry
- Song: "Be My Guest"
- Artist: Gaitana
- Songwriters: Gaitana; Kiwi Project

Placement
- Semi-final result: Qualified (8th, 64 points)
- Final result: 15th, 65 points

Participation chronology

Ukraine was represented at the Eurovision Song Contest 2012 with the song "Be My Guest", written by Gaitana and Kiwi Project, and performed by Gaitana herself. The Ukrainian participating broadcaster, the National Television Company of Ukraine (NTU), organised a national final in order to select its entry for the contest. Twenty-one entries competed in the national selection held on 18 February 2012 and "Be My Guest" performed by Gaitana was selected as the winner following the combination of votes from a seven-member jury panel and a public televote.

Ukraine was drawn to compete in the second semi-final of the Eurovision Song Contest which took place on 24 May 2012. Performing during the show in position 7, "Be My Guest" was announced among the top 10 entries of the second semi-final and therefore qualified to compete in the final on 26 May. It was later revealed that Ukraine placed eighth out of the 18 participating countries in the semi-final with 64 points. In the final, Ukraine performed in position 25 and placed fifteenth out of the 26 participating countries with 65 points.

== Background ==
Prior to the 2012 contest, the National Television Company of Ukraine (NTU) had participated in the Eurovision Song Contest representing Ukraine nine times since its first entry in 2003, winning it in 2004 with the song "Wild Dances" performed by Ruslana. Following the introduction of semi-finals for the 2004, Ukraine had managed to qualify to final in every contest they participated in thus far. Ukraine had been the runner-up in the contest on two occasions: in 2007 with the song "Dancing Lasha Tumbai" performed by Verka Serduchka and in 2008 with the song "Shady Lady" performed by Ani Lorak. Ukraine's least successful result had been 19th place, which they achieved during the 2005, with the song "Razom nas bahato" performed by GreenJolly.

As part of its duties as participating broadcaster, NTU organises the selection of its entry in the Eurovision Song Contest and broadcasts the event in the country. The broadcaster confirmed its intentions to participate at the 2012 contest on 23 August 2011. In the past, NTU had alternated between both internal selections and national finals in order to select the Ukrainian entry. Between 2005 and 2011, NTU had set up national finals to choose both or either the song and performer to compete at Eurovision for Ukraine, with both the public and a panel of jury members involved in the selection. The method was continued to select the 2012 Ukrainian entry.

== Before Eurovision ==
=== Yevrobachennia 2012 – Natsionalnyi vidbir ===
The Ukrainian national final took place on 18 February 2012 at the NTU Studios in Kyiv. The show was hosted by Timur Myroshnychenko and Tetyana Terekhova and broadcast on Pershyi Natsionalnyi as well as online via NTU's official website 1tv.com.ua and the official Eurovision Song Contest website eurovision.tv.

==== Format ====
The selection of the competing entries for the national final and ultimately the Ukrainian Eurovision entry took place over two stages. In the first stage, artists and songwriters had the opportunity to apply for the competition by attending a scheduled audition. Nineteen acts were selected and announced on 26 January 2012, while an additional two acts were selected as wildcards: one from the Inter Channel talent show Show #1 and one from an online wildcard selection via the social network platform say.tv. The second stage was the televised final, which took place on 18 February 2012 and featured the twenty-one acts vying to represent Ukraine in Baku. The winner was selected via the 50/50 combination of votes from a public televote and an expert jury. Both the public televote and the expert jury assigned scores ranging from 1 (lowest) to 22 (highest) and the entry that had the highest number of points following the combination of these scores was declared the winner. Viewers participating in the public televote had the opportunity to submit a single vote per phone number for each of the participating entries via SMS. In the event of a tie, the tie was decided in favour of the entry that received the highest score from the jury.

==== Competing entries ====
Artists and composers had the opportunity to submit their entries between 25 November 2011 and 25 January 2012; Nerealnye was selected as the winner of Show #1 on 10 November 2011 and received the first wildcard to compete in the national final. Auditions were held on 25 January 2012 at the NTU Headquarters in Kyiv where a four-member selection panel consisting of Vlad Baginsky (music producer of NTU), Volodymyr Kozlov (music director of RU), Victoria Romanova (Ukrainian Eurovision Head of Delegation) and Ivo Bobul (singer) reviewed the 54 received submissions and shortlisted twenty entries to compete in the national final. On 26 January 2012, the twenty selected competing acts were announced. The running order draw for the twenty-two acts took place on 12 February 2012 during the NTU programme Shuster Live. An additional four entries were shortlisted from the non-qualifying entries of the auditions for the say.tv online wildcard and users were able to cast their votes on 13 and 14 February 2012. The winner, "Dance" performed by Max Barskih, was announced on 15 February.

On 16 February 2012, "I Will Fight to the End", written by Mikhail Nekrasov and to have been performed by Matias, was withdrawn from the national final due to a conflict of interest between the artist and audition jury member Vlad Baginsky. Matias would later perform the song during the competition as an interval act.

Online wildcard – 13–14 February 2012
Artist	Song	Votes	Place
La Festa	"City Jungle"	—	4
Lena Shtefan	"Lyubov i obman" (Любовь и обман)	857	2
Max Barskih	"Dance"	1,056	1
Yevhen Vynohradov	"Truth"	—	3

Artist	Song	Songwriter(s)
Andrii Bogomolets	"Are You Waiting for Me"	Andrii Bogomolets
Bondarchuk	"I Don't Know Why"	Santa Dimopoulos, Andrey Tymoshchyk
Eduard Romanyuta	"I'll Never Let Go"	Emanuel Olsson, Christian Leuzzi, Christina Christian
Gaitana	"Be My Guest"	Gaitana, Kiwi Project
Ihor Tatarenko	"You're My Life"	Andrey Tymoshchyk, Ray Horton
Legkiy Flirt	"MegaMix"	Oleksandr Komov
Lena Voloshina	"Let It Out"	Lena Voloshina
Marietta	"Rainbow"	Dmytro Sydorov, Natali Dali
Marta	"My Heart Is Sorrowing"	Yulia Barabash, Ruslan Kvinta
Masha Sazonova and Tikhon Levchenko	"I Close to You"	Masha Sazonova, Tikhon Levchenko
Max Barskih	"Dance"	Max Barskih
Mykhailo Gritskan	"Ya tak iskal tebya" (Я так искал тебя)	Mykhailo Gritskan, Volodymyr Budeichuk
Nerealnye	"Just a Dream"	Miguel Shesteprov
Oksana Nesterenko	"Mondo blu"	Ralph Siegel, Mauro Balestri
Olga Shanis	"Dream"	Nicolai Shandrikov, Ira Kononova
Olya Polyakova	"Lepestok" (Лепесток)	Vasily Tkach
Rapira	"Get Over"	Anastasia Mashenko
Renata Shtifel	"Love in Sunlight Rays"	Olena Kucher, Vadym Lysytsya, Daria Partas
Treeorange	"New Day"	Yulia Volium, Yevhen Sukhoi
Uliana Rudakova	"Ty ne odyn" (Ти не один)	Nikita Averkiev
Vitalii Galai	"I Want to Love"	Vitalii Galai, V. Fokina

==== Final ====
The final took place on 18 February 2012. Twenty-one entries competed and the winner, "Be My Guest" performed by Gaitana, was selected through the combination of votes from a public televote and an expert jury. Ties were decided in favour of the entries that received higher scores from the jury. The jury panel consisted of Egor Benkendorf (President of NTU), Walid Arfush (producer), Yuriy Rybchynsky (poet), Semyon Horov (director and composer), Mariya Manyuk (artist agent), Rudolf Kirnos (media producer) and Olena Mozgova (music producer). 16,825 votes were registered by the televote during the show. In addition to the performances of the competing entries, 2010 Ukrainian Eurovision entrant Alyosha, 2012 French Eurovision entrant Anggun, 2012 Swiss Eurovision entrant Sinplus, Matias and Zlata Ognevich performed as guests.

Final – 18 February 2012
R/O	Artist	Song	Jury	Televote		Total	Place
R/O	Artist	Song	Jury	Votes	Points	Total	Place
1	Olga Shanis	"Dream"	10	136	6	16	17
2	Vitalii Galai	"I Want to Love"	3	77	4	7	20
3	Max Barskih	"Dance"	20	996	18	38	2
4	Olya Polyakova	"Lepestok"	15	215	8	23	8
5	Eduard Romanyuta	"I'll Never Let Go"	9	2,749	19	28	5
6	Legkiy Flirt	"MegaMix"	4	62	1	5	21
7	Ihor Tatarenko	"You're My Life"	8	337	14	22	10
8	Mykhailo Gritskan	"Ya tak iskal tebya"	1	493	16	17	16
9	Masha Sazonova and Tikhon Levchenko	"I Close to You"	16	271	11	27	6
10	Marta	"My Heart Is Sorrowing"	7	278	12	19	13
11	Gaitana	"Be My Guest"	21	3,539	20	41	1
12	Oksana Nesterenko	"Mondo blu"	18	848	17	35	3
13	Rapira	"Get Over"	2	266	10	12	19
14	Andrii Bogomolets	"Are You Waiting for Me"	17	71	2	19	11
15	Bondarchuk	"I Don't Know Why"	13	112	5	18	14
16	Renata Shtifel	"Love in Sunlight Rays"	6	5,114	21	27	7
17	Treeorange	"New Day"	5	308	13	18	15
18	Nerealnye	"Just a Dream"	19	491	15	34	4
19	Uliana Rudakova	"Ty ne odyn"	14	235	9	23	9
20	Marietta	"Rainbow"	12	155	7	19	12
21	Lena Voloshina	"Let It Out"	11	72	3	14	18

Detailed Jury Votes
R/O	Song	E. Benkendorf	W. Arfush	Y. Rybchynsky	S. Horov	M. Manyuk	R. Kirnos	O. Mozgova	Total	Points
1	"Dream"	8	5	7	2	5	5	5	37	10
2	"I Want to Love"	6	3	9	2	4	1	3	28	3
3	"Dance"	10	8	8	6	7	7	1	47	20
4	"Lepestok"	8	9	8	4	8	2	3	42	15
5	"I'll Never Let Go"	6	10	8	2	3	6	1	36	9
6	"MegaMix"	6	3	6	5	5	1	3	29	4
7	"You're My Life"	6	7	7	5	6	1	3	35	8
8	"Ya tak iskal tebya"	6	1	4	2	4	2	3	22	1
9	"I Close to You"	10	7	7	4	7	3	5	43	16
10	"My Heart Is Sorrowing"	6	5	6	4	8	4	1	34	7
11	"Be My Guest"	10	10	10	10	10	10	10	70	21
12	"Mondo blu"	9	2	8	6	9	5	6	45	18
13	"Get Over"	6	2	6	4	4	2	3	27	2
14	"Are You Waiting for Me"	8	8	6	5	8	5	4	44	17
15	"I Don't Know Why"	6	5	8	6	6	5	4	40	13
16	"Love in Sunlight Rays"	10	7	10	2	1	2	1	33	6
17	"New Day"	6	4	7	5	6	2	3	33	5
18	"Just a Dream"	9	8	8	6	9	3	3	46	19
19	"Ty ne odyn"	6	8	8	6	7	3	3	41	14
20	"Rainbow"	7	4	8	7	6	4	3	39	12
21	"Let It Out"	6	3	9	5	7	5	3	38	11

== At Eurovision ==
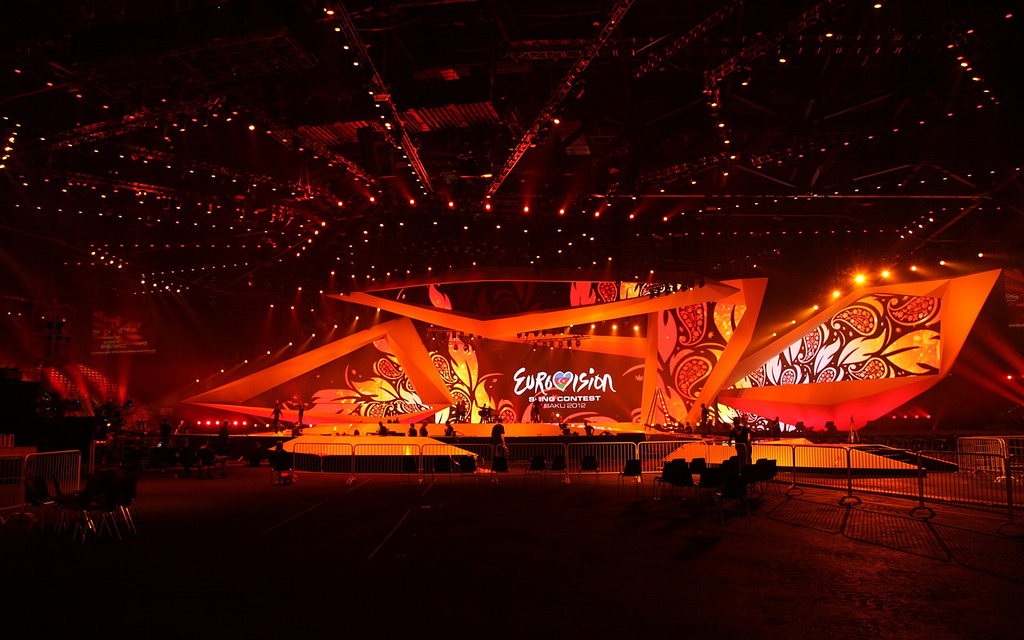
The Eurovision Song Contest 2012 took place at the Baku Crystal Hall in Baku, Azerbaijan

According to Eurovision rules, all nations with the exceptions of the host country and the "Big Five" (France, Germany, Italy, Spain and the United Kingdom) are required to qualify from one of two semi-finals in order to compete for the final; the top ten countries from each semi-final progress to the final. The European Broadcasting Union (EBU) split up the competing countries into six different pots based on voting patterns from previous contests, with countries with favourable voting histories put into the same pot. On 25 January 2012, a special allocation draw was held which placed each country into one of the two semi-finals, as well as which half of the show they would perform in. Ukraine was placed into the second semi-final, to be held on 24 May 2012, and was scheduled to perform in the first half of the show. The running order for the semi-finals was decided through another draw on 20 March 2012. As one of the five wildcard countries, Ukraine chose to perform in position 7, following the entry from Portugal and before the entry from Bulgaria.

In Ukraine, both the semi-finals and the final were broadcast on Pershyi Natsionalnyi with commentary by Timur Miroshnychenko and Tetiana Terekhova. The Ukrainian spokesperson, who announced the Ukrainian votes during the final, was Oleksiy Matias.

=== Semi-final ===
Gaitana took part in technical rehearsals on 15 and 18 May, followed by dress rehearsals on 23 and 24 May. This included the jury final where professional juries of each country watched and voted on the competing entries.

The Ukrainian performance featured Gaitana performing on stage in a long white layered fringe dress designed by Liliia Litkovska together with four dancers in colourful vests and skirts and playing trumpets. The performance began with Gaitana walking through two of four moveable LED panels featured in the middle of the stage that slid open. Dancing people appeared on the panels, while splashes of different coloured paints appeared on the background LED screens. The stage director and choreographer for the Ukrainian performance was Olha Semeshkina.

At the end of the show, Ukraine was announced as having finished in the top 10 and subsequently qualifying for the grand final. It was later revealed that Ukraine placed eighth in the semi-final, receiving a total of 64 points.

=== Final ===
Shortly after the second semi-final, a winners' press conference was held for the ten qualifying countries. As part of this press conference, the qualifying artists took part in a draw to determine the running order for the final. This draw was done in the order the countries appeared in the semi-final running order. Ukraine was drawn to perform in position 25, following the entry from Serbia and before the entry from Moldova.

Gaitana once again took part in dress rehearsals on 25 and 26 May before the final, including the jury final where the professional juries cast their final votes before the live show. Gaitana performed a repeat of her semi-final performance during the final on 26 May. Ukraine placed fifteenth in the final, scoring 65 points.

=== Voting ===
Voting during the three shows consisted of 50 percent public televoting and 50 percent from a jury deliberation. The jury consisted of five music industry professionals who were citizens of the country they represent. This jury was asked to judge each contestant based on: vocal capacity; the stage performance; the song's composition and originality; and the overall impression by the act. In addition, no member of a national jury could be related in any way to any of the competing acts in such a way that they cannot vote impartially and independently.

Following the release of the full split voting by the EBU after the conclusion of the competition, it was revealed that Ukraine had placed twentieth with the public televote and seventh with the jury vote in the final. In the public vote, Ukraine scored 37 points, while with the jury vote, Ukraine scored 125 points. In the second semi-final, Ukraine placed seventeenth with the public televote with 24 points and third with the jury vote, scoring 109 points.

Below is a breakdown of points awarded to Ukraine and awarded by Ukraine in the second semi-final and grand final of the contest. The nation awarded its 12 points to Belarus in the semi-final and to Azerbaijan in the final of the contest.

==== Points awarded to Ukraine ====
Points awarded to Ukraine (Semi-final 2)
Score	Country
12 points	Belarus
10 points	
8 points	
7 points	
6 points	Georgia; Malta; Sweden
5 points	Bulgaria; Estonia; Lithuania
4 points	Serbia
3 points	Macedonia
2 points	Bosnia and Herzegovina; France; Norway; Portugal; United Kingdom
1 point	Croatia; Slovakia

Points awarded to Ukraine (Final)
Score	Country
12 points	
10 points	Belarus
8 points	Moldova; Russia
7 points	Malta
6 points	Georgia; Latvia
5 points	
4 points	
3 points	Azerbaijan; Ireland; Italy; Macedonia
2 points	Lithuania; Spain
1 point	Estonia; Greece; Norway; Portugal

==== Points awarded by Ukraine ====
Points awarded by Ukraine (Semi-final 2)
Score	Country
12 points	Belarus
10 points	Georgia
8 points	Serbia
7 points	Sweden
6 points	Malta
5 points	Macedonia
4 points	Lithuania
3 points	Estonia
2 points	Turkey
1 point	Croatia

Points awarded by Ukraine (Final)
Score	Country
12 points	Azerbaijan
10 points	Russia
8 points	Moldova
7 points	Malta
6 points	Sweden
5 points	Greece
4 points	Italy
3 points	Macedonia
2 points	Serbia
1 point	Estonia
