= Lera Kudryavtseva =

Russian singer and TV personality (born 1971)

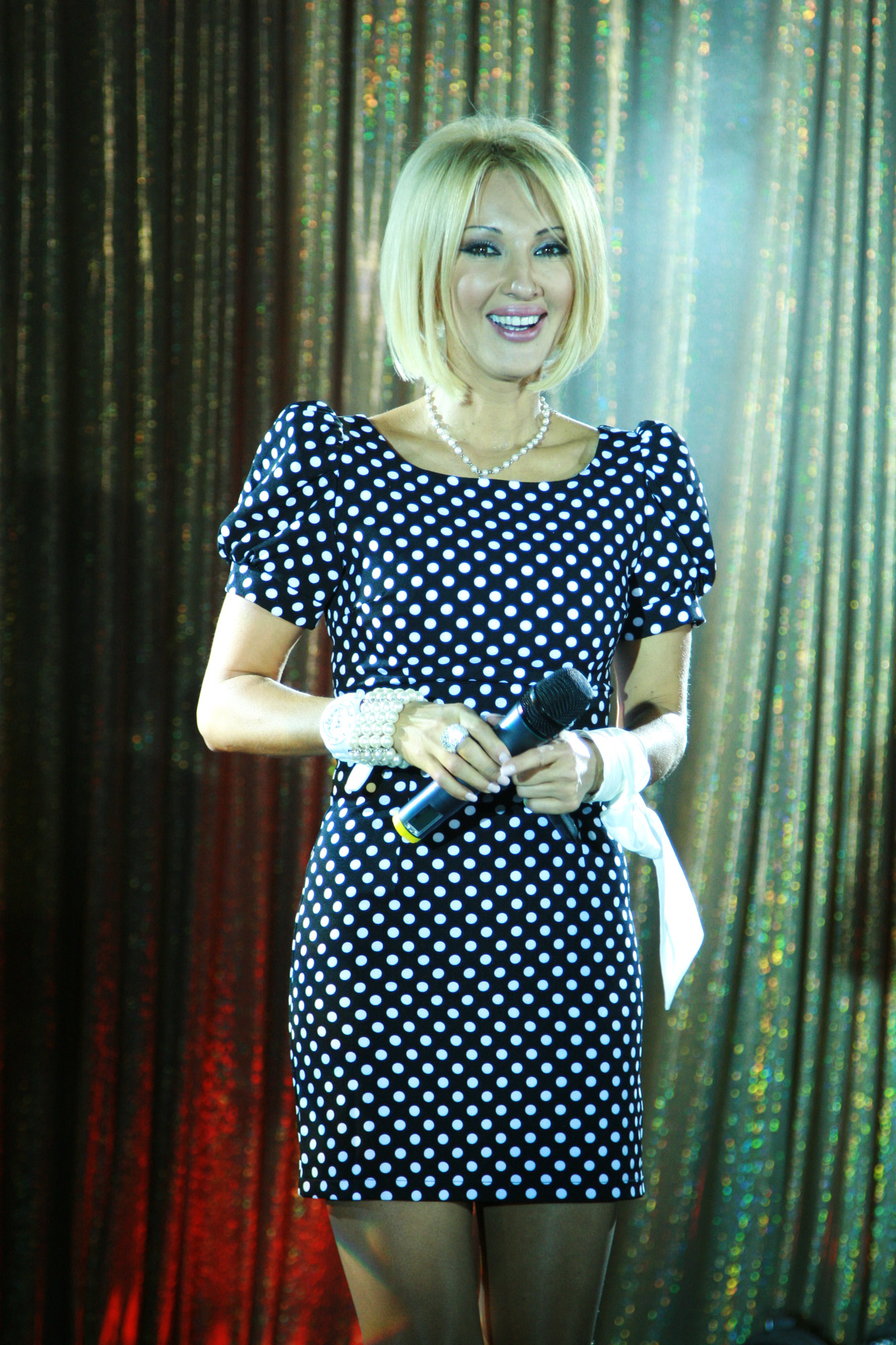
- Kudryavtseva in 2010
- Born: Valeria Lvovna Kudryavtseva; May 19, 1971 (age 55); Ust-Kamenogorsk, Kazakh SSR, USSR
- Education: Kultprosvetuchilische; Russian Academy of Theatre Arts
- Occupations: Television presenter, singer
- Years active: 1995–present
- Height: 1.67 m (5 ft 6 in)
- Spouses: Sergei Linyuk (m. 1990; div. 1992); Matvei Morozov (m. 2004; div. 2007); Igor Makarov (m. 2013)
- Website: lera-kudryavtseva.ru

Valeria Lvovna Kudryavtseva (Russian: Валерия Львовна Кудрявцева; born May 19, 1971), best known as Lera Kudryavtseva (Лера Кудрявцева), is a Kazakhstani-born Russian television presenter and singer.

== Biography ==
Kudryavtseva was born in Ust-Kamenogorsk in 1971 in an ethnic Russian family. Although initially dreaming of a career as a doctor, Kudryavtseva enters the local cultural institute. While her sister moves to Moscow, Kurdyavtseva stays in her hometown and starts working at the local House of Culture, organising concerts. One of the concerts happens to be with the then popular boy band Laskovyi Mai. After marrying the band's drummer Sergei Lenyuk in 1990, Kudryavtseva starts working as a backing vocalist and dancer for several bands and artists, including Evgeny Osin.

Moving to Moscow, Kudryavtseva starts studying at the Russian Academy of Theatre Arts. In 1995, Kudryavtseva passed a screen test to become the co-presenter of the programme Partiynaya zona on the small television station TV-6, alongside Igor Vernik.

In 2002, she had her big breakthrough as a presenter, hosting the inaugural edition of New Wave with Maksim Galkin. The broadcast became one the most watched television programme of the year 2002 in Russia. Kudryavtseva has hosted the competition every year since.

Kudryavtseva also became one of the most well-known presenters on the Russian commercial television station NTV with programmes as Zvyozdy soslish'. Next to that, she started presenting the programme Secret for a million in 2016, in which famous celebrities answer controversial questions about their own life to earn money for charity.

Kudryavtseva has stated that her dream guest would be Russian President Vladimir Putin.

== Personal life ==
From 2004 until 2007, she was married to Matvei Morozov (born 1972).

She was in a relationship with musician Sergey Lazarev from 2008 to 2012.

She has been married to former ice hockey player Igor Makarov since June 2013. The couple have a daughter, who was born in 2018.
