= Mika Newton =

Ukrainian singer (born 1986)

Mika Newton Мiка Ньютон
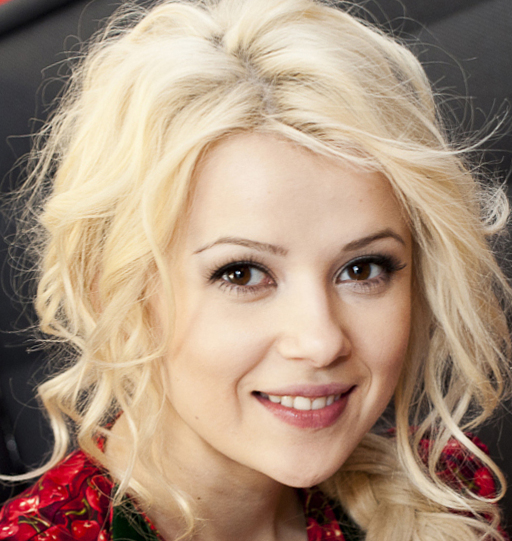

Background information
- Born: Oksana Stefanivna Hrytsai; March 5, 1986 (age 40)
- Origin: Burshtyn, Ukrainian SSR, Soviet Union (now Ukraine)
- Genres: Pop, soul, pop rock, Eurodance, Europop
- Occupation: singer
- Instrument: Vocals
- Years active: 1995–present
- Spouse: Chris Saavedra (m. 2018)
- Website: www.mikanewton.com

Oksana Stefanivna Hrytsai (Note: Ukrainian: Оксана Стефанівна Грицай, romanized: Oksana Stefanivna Hrytsai) (born March 5, 1986), known professionally as Mika Newton, (Note: Ukrainian: Міка Ньютон, romanized: Mika Niuton) is a singer from the city of Burshtyn, Ukraine. Born and raised in Ukraine, she is currently based in Los Angeles, California.

== Early life ==
Oksana Hrytsai was born on 5 March 1986, in Burshtyn, Ukraine. Her stage name comes from Mika, a derivative of Rolling Stones lead singer Mick Jagger's first name, and Newton is an abbreviation of the words "new tone".

Newton taught herself to sing at an early age by imitating artists she heard on the radio. She began entering regional voice competitions at the age of nine.

== Music career ==
At the age of 16, Newton moved from her hometown of Burshtyn to Kyiv, where she enrolled in the College of Circus and Variety Arts, studying voice, piano, acting, dance and pantomime. Continuing to compete in local and international talent competitions, she gained the attention of music industry professionals, and at the age of 16, she was signed with Kyiv-based record label Falyosa Family Factory.

=== Eurovision 2011 ===
Newton was chosen to represent Ukraine in the Eurovision Song Contest in 2011 in Düsseldorf, Germany, singing Ruslan Kvinta and Maryna Skomorohova's "Angel".

The final national selection of participants from Ukraine for Eurovision was broadcast on First National Television Channel. There were 19 participants. The winner was determined by SMS votes (45% of the vote), Internet voting (10%), and jury votes (45%). Newton received the most points, with Zlata Ognevich in second place and Jamala in third.

In the Eurovision final on 14 May 2011, Newton finished fourth with 159 points, behind the entries from Azerbaijan (the winner with 221 points), Italy and Sweden. During her performance, she was accompanied by sand-artist Kseniya Simonova, the 2009 winner of Ukraine's Got Talent.

=== 2012: "Don't Dumb Me Down" ===
Newton released two albums and provided theme songs for a number of Ukrainian and Russian films and television shows prior to Eurovision 2011, which led JK Music Group to invite her to Los Angeles to record for two weeks with songwriter Walter Afanasieff. During her visit, she also performed in front of producer Randy Jackson.

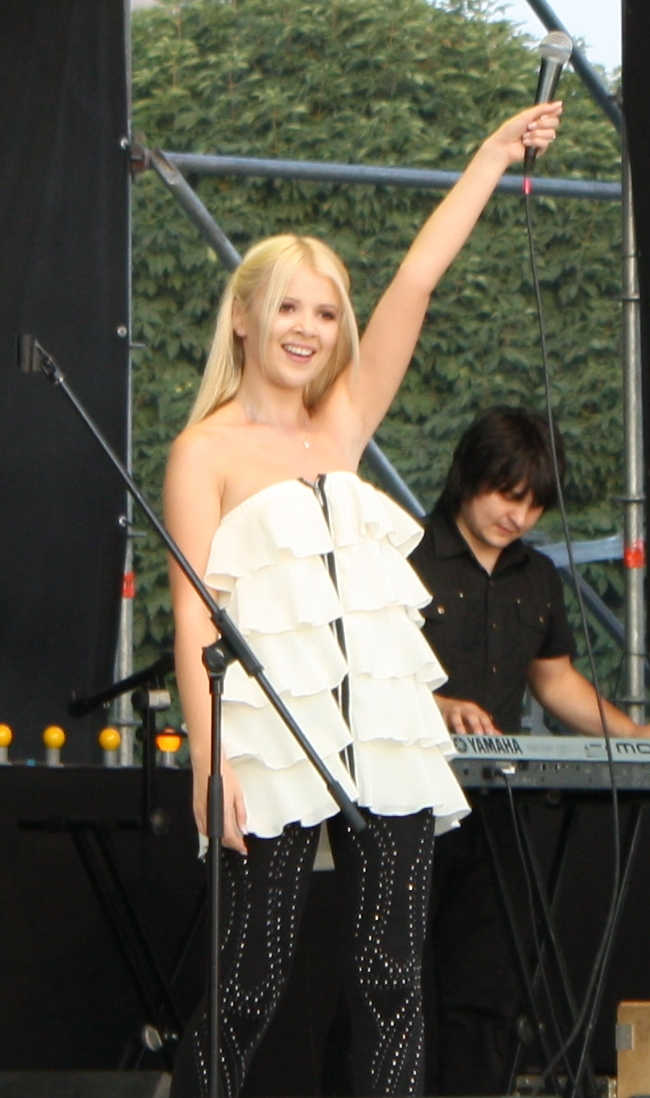
Mika Newton, 17 July 2010

After participating in Eurovision 2011, Newton signed a contract with JK Music Group and Randy Jackson's Friendship Collective, relocating to Los Angeles in June 2011 to pursue a career as a pop-rock singer.

On 21 February 2012, she released her debut U.S. single, "Don't Dumb Me Down". The video for the single, directed by Marc Klasfeld, premiered on MTV's Buzzworthy.

Newton made a guest appearance on Maoren Queen, a Chinese reality show similar to The Hills in March 2012.

=== 2013: "Come Out and Play" and "Magnets" ===
Newton released her new single "Come Out and Play" in 2012, remixed by Paul Oakenfold. Newton and Oakenfold performed at the Winter Music Conference in 2012 to promote the new remix. In April 2013, Mika began performing acoustic shows throughout Los Angeles.

The music video for "Magnets" (co-written by Newton and songwriters Rune Westerberg and Victoria Horn) premiered on the OK! magazine USA website on 20 May 2013.

The music video for Newton's second U.S. single "Come Out and Play", directed by Ali Zamani, premiered at the Lily Bar & Lounge in Las Vegas on 31 August 2013.

Newton was featured in the October 2013 issue of Maxim. Newton was also featured in the January 2014 issue of Chulo Magazine.

Newton sang at the 2022 Grammy Awards with John Legend and fellow Ukrainian artists Siuzanna Iglidan and Lyuba Yakimchuk in a performance that paid tribute to the lives lost during the 2022 Russian invasion of Ukraine, following a message from Ukrainian President Volodymyr Zelenskyy.

== Personal life ==
In December 2018, Newton married talent agent Chris Saavedra in the United States. Newton's sister, Liliya Hrytsai, has been serving in the Ukrainian Army during the 2022 Russian invasion of Ukraine.

== Notes ==
Awards and achievements
Preceded by Alyosha with "Sweet People"	Ukraine in the Eurovision Song Contest; 2011	Succeeded by Gaitana with "Be My Guest"
