= Timur Miroshnychenko =

Ukrainian television presenter

- Тімур Мірошниченко
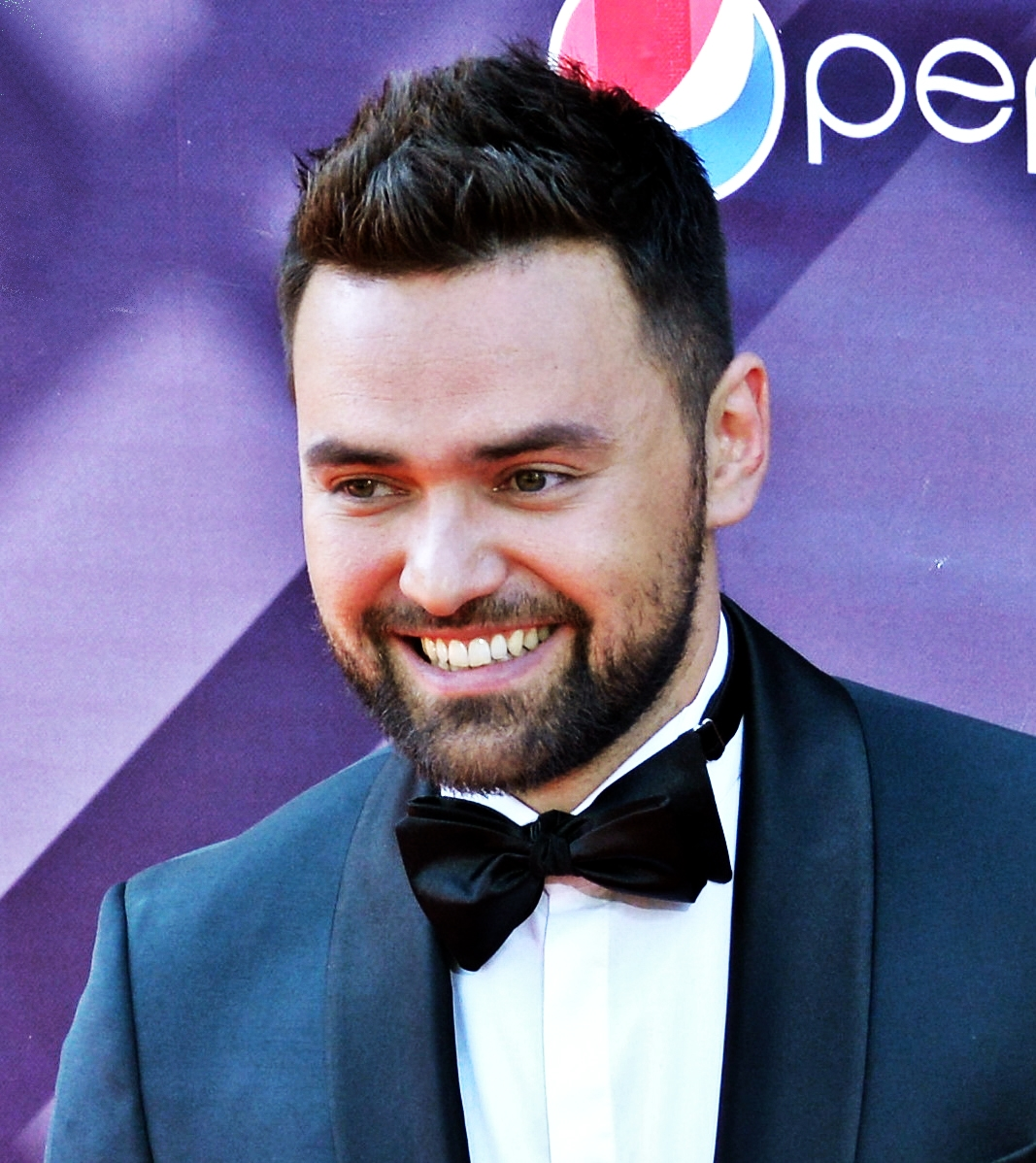
- Miroshnychenko at Eurovision Song Contest 2017
- Born: 9 March 1986 (age 40); Kyiv, Ukrainian SSR, Soviet Union
- Education: National Aviation University
- Occupation: Television presenter
- Years active: 2005–present
- Employer: UA:PBC
- Partner: Inna Rudnyk (m. 2018)
- Children: 3

Timur Valeriyovych Miroshnychenko (Ukrainian: Тімур Валерійович Мірошниченко; born 9 March 1986) is a Ukrainian TV presenter for the channel UA:PBC. He was the host of the Junior Eurovision Song Contest 2009 together with Ani Lorak, and again in 2013 with Zlata Ognevich. He also co-hosted the Eurovision Song Contest 2017.

== Biography ==
Miroshnychenko was born on 9 March 1986 in Kyiv. In his years as a student he was a member of KVN student's team.

His television career began in 2005, when he became the Ukrainian commentator for the Junior Eurovision Song Contest 2005 — the first Junior Eurovision to be broadcast in Ukraine. He went on to become the commentator of the Eurovision Song Contest for Ukraine from 2007, replacing Pavlo Shylko. He has since provided commentary for all contests since, except the contests that he hosted. He also hosted the programme Yak tse? ("How it is?"), also on UA:PBC.

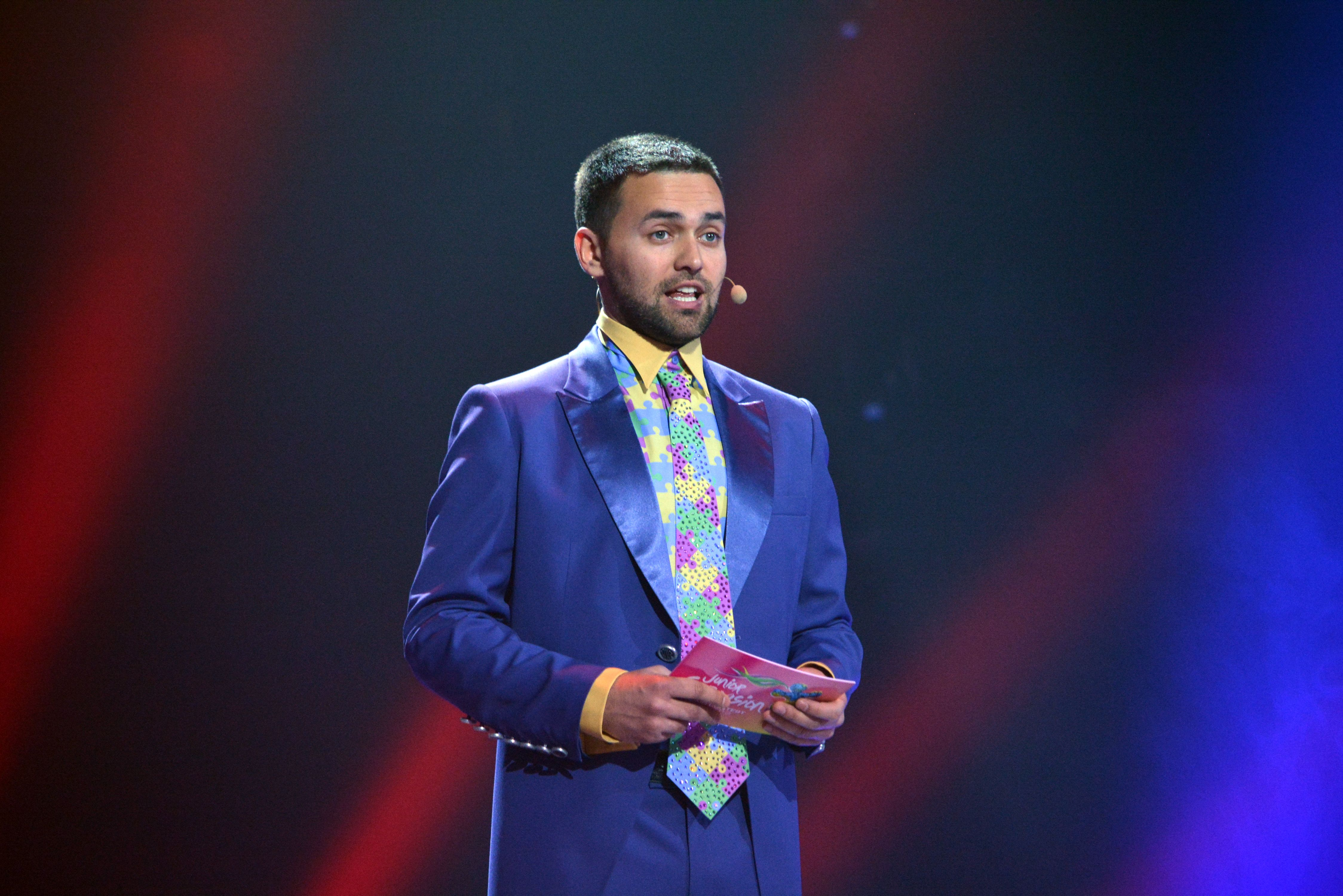
Miroshnychenko during a Junior Eurovision 2013 rehearsal

Miroshnychenko hosted the Junior Eurovision Song Contest 2013 in Kyiv with Zlata Ognevich, his second time hosting the Junior contest. On 26 February 2017, it was announced that Miroshnychenko would host the Eurovision Song Contest 2017 in Kyiv. He acted as the green room host, with Oleksandr Skichko and Volodymyr Ostapchuk acting as the main hosts. It was the first time that the Eurovision Song Contest was presented by a male trio, and the second time, after the 1956 edition with a solo male presenter, that the contest did not feature a female presenter.

In October 2022, Miroshnychenko presented an award at the 27th National Television Awards held in London. He co-hosted the "Turquoise Carpet" and Opening Ceremony events of the Eurovision Song Contest 2023 in Liverpool, and appeared in VT inserts during the three live shows, in addition to his usual role as the Ukrainian commentator for UA:PBC. He additionally moderated the contest's press conferences, along with Jermaine Foster and Mariia Vynogradova.

== See also ==
- List of Junior Eurovision Song Contest presenters
- List of Eurovision Song Contest presenters
- Ukraine in the Eurovision Song Contest
