= Ireland in the Eurovision Song Contest 2012 =

- Eurovision Song Contest 2012
- Participating broadcaster: Raidió Teilifís Éireann (RTÉ)
- Country: Ireland
- Selection process: Eurosong 2012
- Selection date: 24 February 2012

Competing entry
- Song: "Waterline"
- Artist: Jedward
- Songwriters: Nick Jarl; Sharon Vaughn

Placement
- Semi-final result: Qualified (6th, 92 points)
- Final result: 19th, 46 points

Participation chronology

Ireland was represented at the Eurovision Song Contest 2012 with the song "Waterline", written by Nick Jarl and Sharon Vaughn, and performed by the duo Jedward. The Irish participating broadcaster, Raidió Teilifís Éireann (RTÉ), organised the national final Eurosong 2012 in order to select its entry for the contest. Five songs faced the votes of five regional juries and a public televote, ultimately resulting in the selection of "Waterline" performed by Jedward as the Irish Eurovision entry. Jedward had previously represented Ireland in 2011 where they achieved eighth place with the song "Lipstick".

Ireland was drawn to compete in the first semi-final of the Eurovision Song Contest which took place on 22 May 2012. Performing as the closing entry during the show in position 18, "Waterline" was announced among the top 10 entries of the first semi-final and therefore qualified to compete in the final on 26 May. It was later revealed that Ireland placed sixth out of the 18 participating countries in the semi-final with 92 points. In the final, Ireland performed in position 23 and placed nineteenth out of the 26 participating countries, scoring 46 points.

== Background ==
Prior to the 2012 contest, Raidió Teilifís Éireann (RTÉ) and its predecessor national broadcasters have participated in the Eurovision Song Contest representing Ireland forty-five times since RÉ's first entry in 1965. They have won the contest a record seven times in total. Their first win came in 1970, with "All Kinds of Everything" performed by Dana. Ireland holds the record for being the only country to win the contest three times in a row (in 1992, 1993, and 1994), as well as having the only three-time winner (Johnny Logan, who won in 1980 as a singer, 1987 as a singer-songwriter, and again in 1992 as a songwriter). In 2011, "Lipstick" performed by Jedward, managed to qualify to the final and placed eighth, achieving Ireland's highest position in the contest since 2000.

As part of its duties as participating broadcaster, RTÉ organises the selection of its entry in the Eurovision Song Contest and broadcasts the event in the country. The broadcaster confirmed their intentions to participate at the 2012 contest on 2 November 2012. From 2008 to 2011, RTÉ had set up the national final Eurosong to choose both the song and performer to compete at Eurovision for Ireland, with both the public and regional jury groups involved in the selection. For the 2012 contest, RTÉ announced alongside their confirmation on 2 November 2012 the organisation of Eurosong 2012 to choose the artist and song.

== Before Eurovision ==
=== Early rumours ===
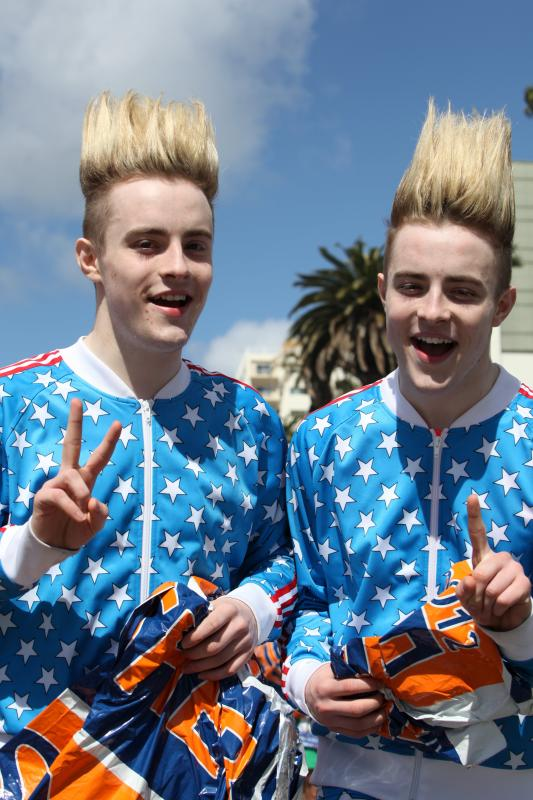
Jedward were previously rumoured to have been internally selected to represent Ireland in the Eurovision Song Contest 2012

In October 2011, it was reported that RTÉ, had internally selected Jedward as its representatives for the second year in a row, after their successful placing in 2011 and the successful ratings of the contest on RTÉ, having drawn the biggest contest audience since 1997. Jedward themselves revealed they will "be doing Eurovision 2012" and that "it's gonna be even bigger and better because [they're] in all these teen magazines, and we go all over Europe". Louis Walsh, the manager of Jedward, expressed his wish for the duo to compete in 2012 almost immediately after they returned to Dublin following the 2011 contest. The Irish Daily Mail claimed Walsh had already approached Lars Jensen, Martin Larsson and Dan Priddy, the songwriters of the 2011 Irish entry “Lipstick”, to create another entry to be performed by Jedward for the contest.

=== Eurosong 2012 ===
Eurosong 2012 was the national final format developed by RTÉ in order to select Ireland's entry for the Eurovision Song Contest 2012. The competition was held on 24 February 2012 at the Studio 4 of RTÉ in Dublin, hosted by Ryan Tubridy and broadcast on RTÉ One during a special edition of The Late Late Show. The show was also broadcast online via RTÉ's official website rte.ie and the official Eurovision Song Contest website eurovision.tv.

==== Competing entries ====
On 3 November 2011, RTÉ revealed the five music industry professionals that were invited to each select and mentor an entry for the competition: producer and former Popstars and You're a Star judge Bill Hughes, singer-songwriter Edele Lynch, music producer, songwriter and member of The Brilliant Things Greg French, agent and choreographer Julian Benson, and singer and former contest winner Linda Martin. The five finalists were announced on 8 February 2012, while their songs were presented on 9 February 2012 during Mooney on RTÉ Radio 1. Among the competing acts were former contestants Donna McCaul who represented Ireland in 2005 together with Joseph McCaul, and Jedward who represented Ireland in 2011.

Artist	Song	Songwriter(s)	Mentor
Andrew Mann	"Here I Am"	Greg French	Greg French
Celtic Aura and Maria McCool	"Mistaken"	Edele Lynch	Edele Lynch
Donna McCaul	"Mercy"	Mårten Eriksson, Peter Månsson, Lina Eriksson, Bill Hughes	Bill Hughes
Jedward	"Waterline"	Nick Jarl, Sharon Vaughn	Linda Martin
Una Gibney and David Shannon	"Language of Love"	Éanán Patterson, Julian Benson	Julian Benson

==== Final ====
The national final took place on 24 February 2012 and featured a guest performance from former contest winner Brotherhood of Man as well as guest appearances from former contest winner Niamh Kavanagh, commentator Marty Whelan and actor Martin Sheen. Following the 50/50 combination of votes from five regional juries and public televoting, "Waterline" performed by Jedward was selected as the winner.

Final – 24 February 2012
R/O	Artist	Song	Jury	Televote	Total	Place
1	Celtic Aura and Maria McCool	"Mistaken"	20	30	50	5
2	Donna McCaul	"Mercy"	44	40	84	3
3	Andrew Mann	"Here I Am"	44	50	94	2
4	Una Gibney and David Shannon	"Language of Love"	38	20	58	4
5	Jedward	"Waterline"	54	60	114	1

Detailed Regional Jury Votes
R/O	Song	Cork	Limerick	Galway	Sligo	Dublin	Total
1	"Mistaken"	4	4	4	4	4	20
2	"Mercy"	8	8	12	6	10	44
3	"Here I Am"	10	10	6	12	6	44
4	"Language of Love"	6	6	10	8	8	38
5	"Waterline"	12	12	8	10	12	54

=== Promotion ===
Jedward specifically promoted "Waterline" as the Irish Eurovision entry on 21 April 2012 by performing during the Eurovision in Concert event which was held at the Melkweg venue in Amsterdam, Netherlands and hosted by Ruth Jacott and Cornald Maas.

== At Eurovision ==
According to Eurovision rules, all nations with the exceptions of the host country and the "Big Five" (France, Germany, Italy, Spain and the United Kingdom) are required to qualify from one of two semi-finals in order to compete for the final; the top ten countries from each semi-final progress to the final. The European Broadcasting Union (EBU) split up the competing countries into six different pots based on voting patterns from previous contests, with countries with favourable voting histories put into the same pot. On 25 January 2012, a special allocation draw was held which placed each country into one of the two semi-finals, as well as which half of the show they would perform in. Ireland was placed into the first semi-final, to be held on 22 May 2012, and was scheduled to perform in the second half of the show. The running order for the semi-finals was decided through another draw on 20 March 2012 and as one of the five wildcard countries, Ireland chose to perform last in position 18, following the entry from Moldova.

In Ireland, the semi-finals were broadcast on RTÉ2 and the final was broadcast on RTÉ One with commentary by Marty Whelan. The second semi-final and final were also broadcast via radio on RTÉ Radio 1 with commentary by Shay Byrne and Zbyszek Zalinski. The Irish spokesperson, who announced the Irish votes during the final, was Gráinne Seoige.

=== Semi-final ===
Jedward took part in technical rehearsals on 14 and 17 May, followed by dress rehearsals on 21 and 22 May. This included the jury show on 21 May where the professional juries of each country watched and voted on the competing entries.

The Irish performance featured Jedward performing on central raised dais and dressed in waterproof gold robot costumes, surrounded by four backing vocalists: Claire O'Malley, Jules Edwards, Leanne Moore and Shane Creevey. Moore had previously been a backing vocalist for Jedward in 2011. As the middle of the dais was stepped on during the performance, a water fountain came on which encircled the duo and soaked them. The performance also featured pyrotechnic effects.

At the end of the show, Ireland was announced as having finished in the top 10 and consequently qualifying for the grand final. It was later revealed that Ireland placed sixth in the semi-final, receiving a total of 92 points.

=== Final ===
Shortly after the first semi-final, a winners' press conference was held for the ten qualifying countries. As part of this press conference, the qualifying artists took part in a draw to determine the running order for the final and Ireland was drawn to perform in position 23, following the entry from Macedonia and before the entry from Serbia.

Jedward once again took part in dress rehearsals on 25 and 26 May before the final, including the jury final where the professional juries cast their final votes before the live show. Jedward performed a repeat of his semi-final performance during the final on 26 May. Ireland placed nineteenth in the final, scoring 46 points.

=== Voting ===
Voting during the three shows consisted of 50 percent public televoting and 50 percent from a jury deliberation. The jury consisted of five music industry professionals who were citizens of the country they represent, with their names published before the contest to ensure transparency. This jury was asked to judge each contestant based on: vocal capacity; the stage performance; the song's composition and originality; and the overall impression by the act. In addition, no member of a national jury could be related in any way to any of the competing acts in such a way that they cannot vote impartially and independently. The individual rankings of each jury member were released shortly after the grand final.

Following the release of the full split voting by the EBU after the conclusion of the competition, it was revealed that Ireland had placed fourth with the public televote and tenth with the jury vote in the first semi-final. In the public vote, Ireland scored 116 points, while with the jury vote, Ireland scored 72 points. In the final, Ireland had placed tenth with the public televote and twenty-fifth with the jury vote. In the public vote, Ireland scored 89 points, while with the jury vote, Ireland scored 14 points.

Below is a breakdown of points awarded to Ireland and awarded by Ireland in the first semi-final and grand final of the contest, and the breakdown of the jury voting and televoting conducted during the two shows:

==== Points awarded to Ireland ====
Points awarded to Ireland (Semi-final 1)
Score	Country
12 points	San Marino
10 points	Iceland; Latvia; Russia
8 points	Austria
7 points	Belgium; Finland; Israel
6 points	Hungary
5 points	Spain
4 points	Azerbaijan
3 points	Greece
2 points	Denmark
1 point	Montenegro

Points awarded to Ireland (Final)
Score	Country
12 points	
10 points	United Kingdom
8 points	
7 points	
6 points	
5 points	Latvia; Netherlands; Sweden
4 points	Belgium; Denmark; Finland; Iceland
3 points	Croatia
2 points	
1 point	Azerbaijan; Belarus

==== Points awarded by Ireland ====
Points awarded by Ireland (Semi-final 1)
Score	Country
12 points	Romania
10 points	Greece
8 points	Russia
7 points	Denmark
6 points	Belgium
5 points	Cyprus
4 points	Latvia
3 points	Finland
2 points	Moldova
1 point	Albania

Points awarded by Ireland (Final)
Score	Country
12 points	Sweden
10 points	Germany
8 points	Estonia
7 points	Lithuania
6 points	Russia
5 points	Romania
4 points	United Kingdom
3 points	Ukraine
2 points	Italy
1 point	Azerbaijan

==== Detailed voting results ====
Jury points awarded by Ireland (Semi-final 1)
Score	Country
12 points	Belgium
10 points	Romania
8 points	Finland
7 points	Greece
6 points	Cyprus
5 points	Denmark
4 points	Israel
3 points	Hungary
2 points	Albania
1 point	Switzerland

Jury points awarded by Ireland (Final)
Score	Country
12 points	Estonia
10 points	Germany
8 points	Sweden
7 points	Ukraine
6 points	Italy
5 points	Azerbaijan
4 points	Romania
3 points	Denmark
2 points	Spain
1 point	France
