= Iceland in the Eurovision Song Contest 2012 =

- Eurovision Song Contest 2012
- Participating broadcaster: Ríkisútvarpið (RÚV)
- Country: Iceland
- Selection process: Söngvakeppni Sjónvarpsins 2012
- Selection date: 11 February 2012

Competing entry
- Song: "Never Forget"
- Artist: Greta Salóme and Jónsi
- Songwriters: Greta Salóme Stefánsdóttir

Placement
- Semi-final result: Qualified (8th, 75 points)
- Final result: 20th, 46 points

Participation chronology

Iceland was represented at the Eurovision Song Contest 2012 with the song "Never Forget" written by Greta Salóme Stefánsdóttir. The song was performed by Greta Salóme and Jónsi. Jónsi previously represented Iceland in the Eurovision Song Contest 2004, where he placed nineteenth in the final of the competition with the song "Heaven". The Icelandic entry for the 2012 contest in Baku, Azerbaijan was selected through the national final Söngvakeppni Sjónvarpsins 2012, organised by the Icelandic broadcaster Ríkisútvarpið (RÚV). The selection consisted of three semi-finals and a final, held on 14 January, 21 January, 28 January and 11 February 2012, respectively. Five songs competed in each semi-final with the top two as selected by a public televote alongside a jury wildcard advancing to the final. In the final, "Mundu eftir mér" performed by Greta Salóme and Jónsi emerged as the winner through a 50/50 combination of jury voting and public televoting. The song was later translated from Icelandic to English for the Eurovision Song Contest and was titled "Never Forget".

Iceland was drawn to compete in the first semi-final of the Eurovision Song Contest which took place on 22 May 2012. Performing during the show in position 2, "Never Forget" was announced among the top 10 entries of the first semi-final and therefore qualified to compete in the final on 26 May. It was later revealed that the Iceland placed eighth out of the 18 participating countries in the semi-final with 75 points. In the final, Iceland performed in position 7 and placed twentieth out of the 26 participating countries, scoring 46 points.

== Background ==
Prior to the 2012 contest, Iceland had participated in the Eurovision Song Contest twenty-four times since its first entry in 1986. Iceland's best placing in the contest to this point was second, which it achieved on two occasions: in 1999 with the song "All Out of Luck" performed by Selma and in 2009 with the song "Is It True?" performed by Yohanna. Since the introduction of a semi-final to the format of the Eurovision Song Contest in 2004, Iceland has, to this point, only failed to qualify to the final three times. In 2011, Iceland managed to qualify to the final and placed twentieth with the song "Coming Home" performed by Sjonni's Friends.

The Icelandic national broadcaster, Ríkisútvarpið (RÚV), broadcasts the event within Iceland and organises the selection process for the nation's entry. RÚV confirmed their intentions to participate at the 2012 Eurovision Song Contest on 8 September 2011. Since 2006, Iceland has used a national final to select their entry for the Eurovision Song Contest, a method that continued for their 2012 participation.

== Before Eurovision ==
=== Söngvakeppni Sjónvarpsins 2012 ===
Söngvakeppni Sjónvarpsins 2012 was the national final format developed by RÚV in order to select Iceland's entry for the Eurovision Song Contest 2012. The four shows in the competition took place in Reykjavík: the three semi-finals were held at the RÚV studios and hosted by Brynja Þorgeirsdóttir, and the final took place at the Harpa venue and hosted by Brynja Þorgeirsdóttir and 1997 Icelandic Eurovision entrant Páll Óskar. The semi-finals and final were broadcast on RÚV and online at the broadcaster's official website ruv.is. The final was also streamed online at the Eurovision Song Contest official website eurovision.tv.

==== Format ====
Fifteen songs in total competed in Söngvakeppni Sjónvarpsins 2012 where the winner was determined after three semi-finals and a final. Five songs competed in each semi-final on 14, 21 and 28 January 2012. The top two songs from each semi-final qualified to the final which took place on 11 February 2012. A wildcard act was selected by the jury for the final out of the remaining non-qualifying acts from both semi-finals. The results of the semi-finals and final were determined by 50/50 public televoting and jury voting. All songs were required to be performed in Icelandic during all portions of the competition, however, it will be up to the winning composers to decide the language that will be performed at the Eurovision Song Contest in Baku.

The jury panel that voted in the semi-finals and final consisted of:

- Kristín Björg Þorsteinsdóttir – former program producer
- Álfheiður Erla Guðmundsdóttir – music student, singer
- Davíð Olgeirsson – singer-songwriter
- Kristjana Stefánsdóttir – singer
- Magnús Kjartansson – musician
- Logi Pedro Stefánsson – musician, bassist of the band Retro Stefson
- Þórdís Schram – dancer, singer

==== Competing entries ====
On 8 September 2011, RÚV opened the submission period for interested songwriters to submit their entries until the deadline on 10 October 2011. Songwriters were required to be Icelandic or possess Icelandic citizenship, and had the right to collaborate with foreign songwriters and submit up to three entries. At the close of the submission deadline, 150 entries were received. A selection committee was formed in order to select the top fifteen entries. RÚV presented the fifteen competing artists and songs on 9, 16 and 23 January 2012 via radio on Rás 2. Among the competing artists were previous Icelandic Eurovision entrant Jónsi, who represented Iceland in 2004, and Regína Ósk, who represented Iceland in 2008 as part of Euroband.

Artist	Song	Songwriter(s)
Blár Ópal	"Stattu upp"	Ingólfur Þórarinsson, Axel Árnason
Ellert Jóhannsson	"Ég kem með"	Ellert H. Jóhannsson, Mikael Tamar Elíasson
Fatherz'n'sonz	"Rýtingur"	Gestur Guðnason, Hallvarður Ásgeirsson
Greta Salóme, Heiða and Guðrún Árný	"Aldrei sleppir mér"	Greta Salóme Stefánsdóttir
Greta Salóme and Jónsi	"Mundu eftir mér"	Greta Salóme Stefánsdóttir
Guðrún Árný Karlsdóttir	"Minningar"	Valgeir Skagfjörð
Heiða Ólafsdóttir	"Við hjartarót mína"	Árni Hjartarson
Herbert Guðmundsson	"Eilíf ást"	Herbert Guðmundsson, Svanur Herbertsson, Herbert Guðmundsson
Íris Hólm	"Leyndarmál"	Sveinn Rúnar Sigurðsson, Þórunn Erna Clausen
Íris Lind Verudóttir	"Aldrei segja aldrei"	Pétur Arnar Kristinsson
Magni Ásgeirsson	"Hugarró"	Sveinn Rúnar Sigurðsson, Þórunn Erna Clausen
Regína Ósk	"Hjartað brennur"	María Björk Sverrisdóttir, Marcus Frenell, Fredrik Randquist, Kristján Hreinsson, Anna Andersson
Rósa Birgitta Ísfeld	"Stund með þér"	Sveinn Rúnar Sigurðsson, Þórunn Erna Clausen
Simbi and Hrútspungarnir	"Hey"	Magnús Hávarðarson
Svenni Þór	"Augun þín"	Hilmar Hlíðberg Gunnarsson, Þorsteinn Eggertsson

==== Semi-finals ====
The three semi-finals took place on 14, 21 and 28 January 2012. In each semi-final five acts presented their entries, and votes from a jury panel (50%) and public televoting (50%) determined the top two entries that proceeded to the final. "Stund með þér" performed by Rósa Birgitta Ísfeld was awarded the jury wildcard and also proceeded to the final.

Semi-final 1 – 14 January 2012
R/O	Artist	Song	Result
1	Íris Hólm	"Leyndarmál"	—N/a
2	Greta Salóme and Jónsi	"Mundu eftir mér"	Advanced
3	Fatherz'n'sonz	"Rýtingur"	—N/a
4	Blár Ópal	"Stattu upp"	Advanced
5	Heiða Ólafsdóttir	"Við hjartarót mína"	—N/a

Semi-final 2 – 21 January 2012
R/O	Artist	Song	Result
1	Guðrún Árný Karlsdóttir	"Minningar"	—N/a
2	Ellert Jóhannsson	"Ég kem með"	—N/a
3	Regína Ósk	"Hjartað brennur"	Advanced
4	Simbi and Hrútspungarnir	"Hey"	Advanced
5	Rósa Birgitta Ísfeld	"Stund með þér"	Wildcard

Semi-final 3 – 28 January 2012
R/O	Artist	Song	Result
1	Herbert Guðmundsson	"Eilíf ást"	—N/a
2	Magni Ásgeirsson	"Hugarró"	Advanced
3	Greta Salóme, Heiða and Guðrún Árný	"Aldrei sleppir mér"	Advanced
4	Svenni Þór	"Augun þín"	—N/a
5	Íris Lind Verudóttir	"Aldrei segja aldrei"	—N/a

==== Final ====
The final took place on 11 February 2012 where the seven entries that qualified from the preceding three semi-finals competed. Prior to the final, Greta Salóme withdrew as the performer of the song "Aldrei sleppir mér" in favour of her second song "Mundu eftir mér". The winner, "Mundu eftir mér" performed by Greta Salóme and Jónsi, was determined by votes from a jury panel (50%) and public televoting (50%). In addition to the performances of the competing artists, the show was opened by 2010 Icelandic Eurovision entrant Hera Björk covering the 1988 Eurovision winning entry "Ne partez pas sans moi" and the 2007 Eurovision winning entry "Molitva", while the interval act featured performances by host Páll Óskar.

Final – 11 February 2012
R/O	Artist	Song	Jury	Televote		Total	Place
R/O	Artist	Song	Jury	Votes	Points	Total	Place
1	Heiða and Guðrún Árný	"Aldrei sleppir mér"	—	—	—	—	—
2	Magni Ásgeirsson	"Hugarró"	10	16,643	8	18	3
3	Rósa Birgitta Ísfeld	"Stund með þér"	—	—	—	—	—
4	Simbi and Hrútspungarnir	"Hey"	—	—	—	—	—
5	Regína Ósk	"Hjartað brennur"	—	—	—	—	—
6	Blár Ópal	"Stattu upp"	8	19,366	12	20	2
7	Greta Salóme and Jónsi	"Mundu eftir mér"	12	18,649	10	22	1

=== Preparation ===
On 19 March 2012, it was announced that "Mundu eftir mér" would be performed in English at the Eurovision Song Contest and would be titled "Never Forget". The official music video for the song, directed by Hannes Þór and featuring members of the Iceland Symphony Orchestra, was released on the same day.

== At Eurovision ==
According to Eurovision rules, all nations with the exceptions of the host country and the "Big Five" (France, Germany, Italy, Spain and the United Kingdom) are required to qualify from one of two semi-finals in order to compete for the final; the top ten countries from each semi-final progress to the final. The European Broadcasting Union (EBU) split up the competing countries into six different pots based on voting patterns from previous contests, with countries with favourable voting histories put into the same pot. On 25 January 2012, a special allocation draw was held which placed each country into one of the two semi-finals, as well as which half of the show they would perform in. Iceland was placed into the first semi-final, to be held on 22 May 2012, and was scheduled to perform in the first half of the show. The running order for the semi-finals was decided through another draw on 20 March 2012 and Iceland was set to perform in position 2, following the entry from Montenegro and before the entry from Greece.

The two semi-finals and the final were broadcast in Iceland on RÚV with commentary by Hrafnhildur Halldorsdóttir. The Icelandic spokesperson, who announced the Icelandic votes during the final, was Matthías Matthíasson who previously represented Iceland in 2011 as part of Sjonni's Friends.

=== Semi-final ===
Greta Salóme and Jónsi took part in technical rehearsals on 13 and 17 May, followed by dress rehearsals on 21 and 22 May. This included the jury show on 15 May where the professional juries of each country watched and voted on the competing entries.

The Icelandic performance featured Greta Salóme in a black dress with a long train, who also played the violin, and Jónsi, joined on stage by four backing vocalists all dressed in black outfits. The LED screens displayed a snowy mountainous glacial landscape with Northern Lights appearing throughout the performance. The backing vocalists that joined Greta Salóme and Jónsi were: Pétur Örn Guðmundsson, Alma Rut Kristjánsdóttir, Friðrik Ómar Hjörleifsson and Guðrún Árný Karlsdóttir. Friðrik Ómar Hjörleifsson previously represented Iceland in 2008 as part of Euroband.

At the end of the show, Iceland was announced as having finished in the top 10 and subsequently qualifying for the grand final. It was later revealed that Iceland placed eighth in the semi-final, receiving a total of 75 points.

=== Final ===
Shortly after the first semi-final, a winners' press conference was held for the ten qualifying countries. As part of this press conference, the qualifying artists took part in a draw to determine the running order for the final. This draw was done in the order the countries were announced during the semi-final. Iceland was drawn to perform in position 7, following the entry from Russia and before the entry from Cyprus.

Greta Salóme and Jónsi once again took part in dress rehearsals on 25 and 26 May before the final, including the jury final where the professional juries cast their final votes before the live show. The duet performed a repeat of their semi-final performance during the final on 26 May. Iceland placed twentieth in the final, scoring 46 points.

=== Voting ===
Voting during the three shows consisted of 50 percent public televoting and 50 percent from a jury deliberation. The jury consisted of five music industry professionals who were citizens of the country they represent. This jury was asked to judge each contestant based on: vocal capacity; the stage performance; the song's composition and originality; and the overall impression by the act. In addition, no member of a national jury could be related in any way to any of the competing acts in such a way that they cannot vote impartially and independently.

Following the release of the full split voting by the EBU after the conclusion of the competition, it was revealed that Iceland had placed nineteenth with both the public televote and the jury vote in the final. In the public vote, Iceland scored 39 points, while with the jury vote, Iceland scored 53 points. In the first semi-final, Iceland placed eighth with the public televote with 79 points and eleventh with the jury vote, scoring 70 points.

Below is a breakdown of points awarded to Iceland and awarded by Iceland in the first semi-final and grand final of the contest. The nation awarded its 12 points to Cyprus in the semi-final and to Sweden in the final of the contest.

==== Points awarded to Iceland ====
Points awarded to Iceland (Semi-final 1)
Score	Country
12 points	
10 points	Denmark; Finland
8 points	Cyprus
7 points	
6 points	Spain
5 points	Belgium; Greece; Latvia; Montenegro
4 points	Hungary; Israel; Switzerland
3 points	San Marino
2 points	Austria; Moldova
1 point	Italy; Russia

Points awarded to Iceland (Final)
Score	Country
12 points	
10 points	
8 points	
7 points	Finland
6 points	Denmark; Estonia; Hungary
5 points	Norway
4 points	Slovakia; Slovenia; Spain
3 points	Germany
2 points	
1 point	Cyprus

==== Points awarded by Iceland ====
Points awarded by Iceland (Semi-final 1)
Score	Country
12 points	Cyprus
10 points	Ireland
8 points	Denmark
7 points	Finland
6 points	Russia
5 points	Greece
4 points	Romania
3 points	Albania
2 points	Switzerland
1 point	Austria

Points awarded by Iceland (Final)
Score	Country
12 points	Sweden
10 points	Estonia
8 points	Cyprus
7 points	Russia
6 points	France
5 points	Denmark
4 points	Ireland
3 points	Serbia
2 points	Spain
1 point	Norway
