= Loge =

Loge may refer to:

== Places ==
- Loge-Fougereuse, a village and municipality in the Vendée department of France
- La Loge, Pas-de-Calais, a municipality in the Pas-de-Calais department of France
- La Loge-Pomblin, a municipality in the Aube department of France
- La Loge-aux-Chèvres, a municipality in the Aube department of France
- Small trading stations of French India

== Other uses ==
- Loge (moon), a natural satellite of Saturn
- Loki (German: Loge), a minor god in Norse mythology who alternately helps and opposes the other gods
- Logi (mythology) (Swedish: Loge), the personification of fire in Norse mythology
- Loge, a character in Richard Wagner's Der Ring des Nibelungen that synthesizes both Loki and Logi
- La Loge, an 1874 painting by Pierre-Auguste Renoir also known as The Theatre Box
- Box (theatre), also known as loge, a small, separated seating area in the auditorium for a limited number of people
- Natural logarithm (ln), or logarithm base e, a mathematical function

== See also ==
- Loki (disambiguation)
- Logi (disambiguation)
