= Greece in the Eurovision Song Contest 2012 =

- Eurovision Song Contest 2012
- Participating broadcaster: Hellenic Broadcasting Corporation (ERT)
- Country: Greece
- Selection process: Ellinikós Telikós 2012
- Selection date: 12 March 2012

Competing entry
- Song: "Aphrodisiac"
- Artist: Eleftheria Eleftheriou
- Songwriters: Dimitri Stassos; Mikaela Stenström; Dajana Lööf

Placement
- Semi-final result: Qualified (4th, 116 points)
- Final result: 17th, 64 points

Participation chronology

Greece was represented at the Eurovision Song Contest 2012 with the song "Aphrodisiac", written by Dimitri Stassos, Mikaela Stenström, and Dajana Lööf, and performed by Eleftheria Eleftheriou. The Greek participating broadcaster, the Hellenic Broadcasting Corporation (ERT), selected its entry through the televised national final Ellinikós Telikós held on 12 March 2012 at the River West shopping mall in Athens. Due to the debt crisis facing Greece at the time, the record label of the entry was expected to take on the costs of recording and producing the candidate songs. Universal Music Greece was the only label to accept these terms and put forth four competing acts for consideration. The winning act was selected using a combination of jury and televoting. Following the national final, Eleftheriou embarked on a promotional campaign visiting Turkey and the Netherlands. Eleftheriou had previously attempted to represent Greece in 2010.

Greece was drawn to appear third in the first semi-final of the Eurovision Song Contest 2012, which was held on 22 May. There, the nation placed fourth with 116 points and qualified for the grand final, held four days later. Greece was randomly selected the 16th position at the grand final allocation draw, performing after Denmark and before Sweden. The entry received 64 points at the grand final from a combined jury and televote, finishing in 17th place.

== Background ==
Prior to the 2012 contest, Greece had participated in the Eurovision Song Contest 32 times since their first entry in 1974. To this point, they won the contest once, in 2005 with the song "My Number One" performed by Helena Paparizou, and placed third three times: in 2001 with the song "Die for You" performed by the duo Antique; in 2004 with "Shake It" performed by Sakis Rouvas; and in 2008 with "Secret Combination" performed by Kalomira. Following the introduction of semi-finals for the 2004 contest, Greece qualified for the grand final each year. Their least successful result was in 1998 when they placed 20th with the song "Mia krifi evaisthisia" by Thalassa, receiving only 12 points in total, all from Cyprus.

As part of its duties as participating broadcaster, the Hellenic Broadcasting Corporation (ERT) organises the selection of its entry in the Eurovision Song Contest and broadcasts the event in the country. In late November 2011, ERT's deputy public relations spokesperson Areti Kalesaki confirmed the country's participation in the Eurovision Song Contest 2012 citing the contest's popularity. She also stated that their budget for the event would be lowered significantly compared to previous years.

== Before Eurovision ==
=== Ellinikós Telikós 2012 ===
On 30 January 2012, the Greek national broadcaster ERT revealed that the national final Ellinikós Telikós 2012 (Greek: Ελληνικός Τελικός 2012) would select the Greek entry for the Eurovision Song Contest 2012. ERT reaffirmed Greece would be participating in the contest at the most minimal possible cost due to the Greek government-debt crisis affecting the country. To achieve this, the broadcaster took a different approach compared to previous years, seeking to share a majority of the costs of participation with a large record label that had international experience. Among the costs ERT sought for the label to cover were those of recording and production of the candidate songs, promotion including the production of the winner's promotional CD, wages for creative and artistic professionals and covering the trip and accommodations in Baku. The only label to accept the terms was Universal Music Greece, leading to an agreement between the broadcaster and the label to organize the selection process. The four competed songs competed in playback, with the winner decided by a 50/50 combination of public and jury voting. The jury consisted of Marina Lahana (radio producer and Head of ERA2), Andreas Pilarinos (conductor), Foteini Giannolatou (Head of Public Relations for ERT), Mihalis Tsaousopoulos (radio producer) and Tasos Trifonos (radio producer). Public voting was conducted through telephone or SMS, with 10,385 telephone votes and 14,172 SMS votes being cast during the show. All proceeds from the voting went to the charity organisations Kivotos Tou Kosmou (Arc of the world), Paidika Horia SOS (Children's villages SOS) and To Hamogelo Tou Paidiou (The smile of a child).

==== Competing entries ====
On 23 February 2012, ERT announced that four candidate entries would compete in Ellinikós Telikós 2012. Five days later, the competing songs, without revealing their performers and songwriters, were released through the ERT website and official Facebook and Twitter pages; the songs then began playing on Hellenic Radio stations on 1 March 2012. The running order draw for the competing entries took place on 4 March during a media event hosted by ERT and Universal Music Greece. The next day, preview videos of each song revealing their performers aired on ERT. The names of the four acts, all signed to Universal, were released on 5 March; they included Cassiopeia, Dora, Eleftheria Eleftheriou and Velvet Fire.

Dora's "Baby I'm Yours" was written by the duo Hush Hush, which consisted of Franc, and Ilias Pantazopoulos, with lyrics by Nektarios Tyrakis. Tyrakis is best known for writing lyrics for Greece's 2004 entry "Shake It", as well as Belarus's 2005 entry "Love Me Tonight". Dora had previously tried to represent Greece in the Junior Eurovision Song Contest 2006 at age 14, but placed fourth in the national final. The band Cassiopeia's song "Killer Bee" was composed by Christos Dantis with lyrics by Leonidas Chatzaras. Dantis was best known for writing Greece's winning entry "My Number One" in 2005, as well as his participation in the 2007 Greek national final. Cassiopeia was formed shortly before the national final, and consisted of three women named Elena, Naya and Maria. The third entry Velvet Fire's song "No Parking" was written by George Samuelson and Leonidas Chantzaras. Velvet Fire was formed a few months prior to Ellinikós Telikós 2012 and consisted of George Alex and May Sokolai. The fourth and final competing entry, Eleftheriou's song "Aphrodisiac", was written by Dimitri Stassos, Mikaela Stenström and Dajana Lööf. Stassos had previously written Spain's 2009 Eurovision entry "La noche es para mí", while Eleftheriou had taken part in the second season of Greek talent show The X Factor. She had also tried to represent Greece in the Eurovision Song Contest 2010, but a week before song presentations her song was leaked, thus disqualifying her from the national final.

==== Final ====
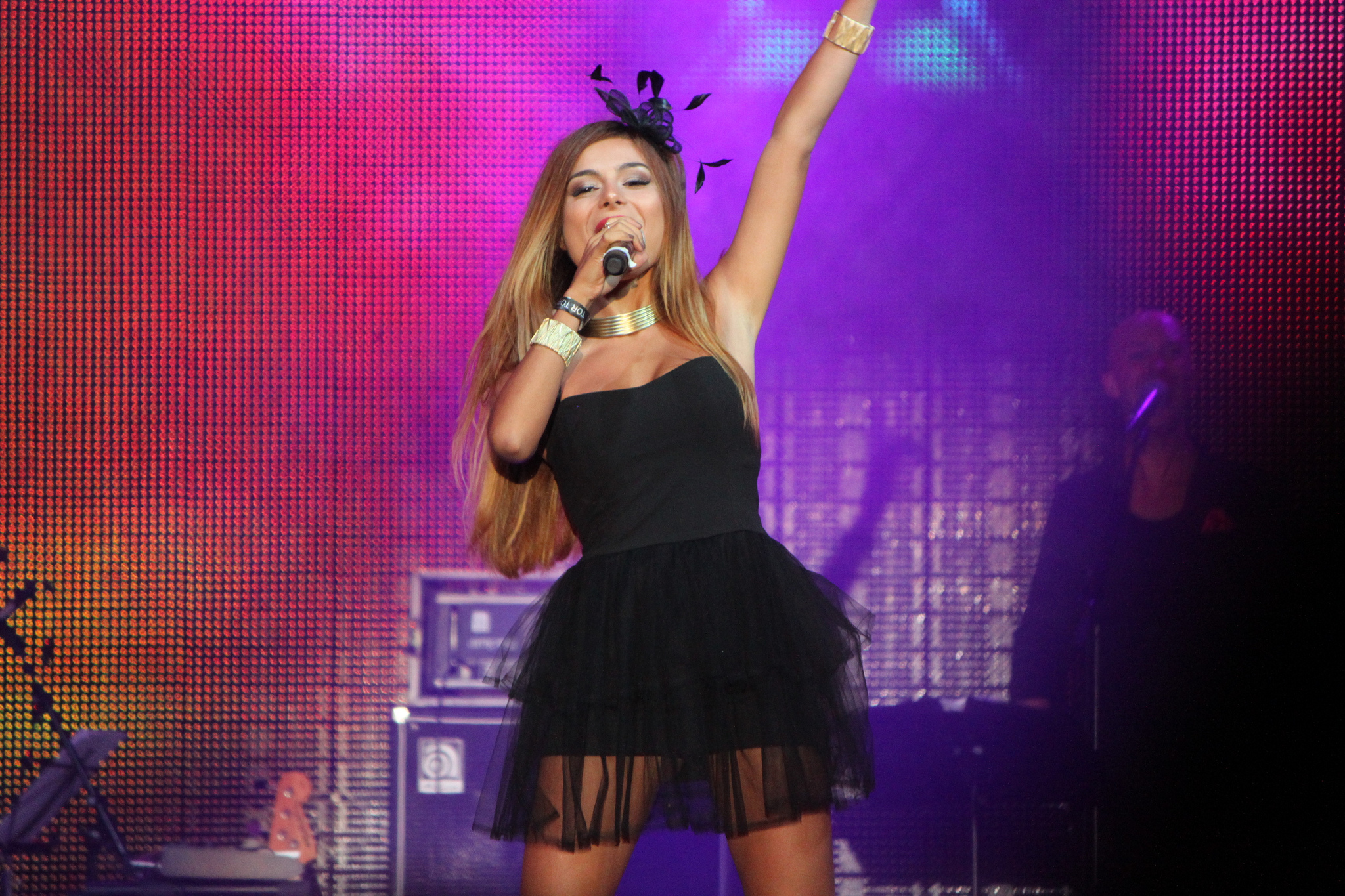
Eleftheria Eleftheriou won Ellinikós Telikós 2012 with the song "Aphrodisiac".

Ellinikós Telikós 2012 took place on 12 March at the River West shopping mall in Athens, hosted by Maria Kozakou and Giorgos Frantzeskakis. The show was televised on both ET1 and ERT World as well as online on both the ERT and official Eurovision Song Contest websites. At the end of voting, Eleftheriou with "Aphrodisiac" was selected as the Greek entry for the Eurovision Song Contest 2012, having won both the public and jury vote. The show received a market share of 10.8% according to ABG Nielsen Hellas, and #EurovisionGR was a worldwide trending topic on Twitter during its airing. In addition to the performances of the competing entries, the interval acts featured guest performances by Eurovision Song Contest 2012 entrants Sofi Marinova of Bulgaria, Ivi Adamou of Cyprus and Anggun of France. Singers Giorgos Sabanis, Christos P. and Greece's 2011 participant Loukas Yorkas were also present at the show.

Final – 12 March 2012
R/O	Artist	Song	Songwriter(s)	Place
1	Dora	"Baby I'm Yours"	Franc, Ilias Pantazopoulos, Nektarios Tyrakis	—N/a
2	Cassiopeia	"Killer Bee"	Christos Dantis, Leonidas Chantzaras	—N/a
3	Velvet Fire	"No Parking"	George Samuelson, Leonidas Chantzaras	—N/a
4	Eleftheria Eleftheriou	"Aphrodisiac"	Dimitri Stassos, Mikaela Stenström, Dajana Lööf	1

==== Reception ====
Reactions to the national final were mostly negative, with many media personalities and viewers criticizing the choice of venue, poor production, lack of vision, poor hosts and use of playback vocals instead of live vocals. Many also complained that Eleftheriou's song and performance were reminiscent of past entrants Paparizou and Kalomoira. Despite the many complaints, others applauded the broadcaster's efforts to take part in the contest with a limited budget and its clever choice of using a shopping mall's natural setting as a backdrop as opposed to a dark studio as was the case the previous year for Ellinikós Telikós 2011. Former entrant Sakis Rouvas also commended the broadcaster for continuing on a tight budget and commented that the result of production should have been expected as it was "a sign of the times", referring to the Greek government-debt crisis.

=== Promotion ===
To promote the entry, Eleftheriou made several appearances across Europe, including a stop in Turkey, as well as in the Netherlands, where she participated in Eurovision in Concert at club Melkweg in Amsterdam on 21 April 2012.

== At Eurovision ==
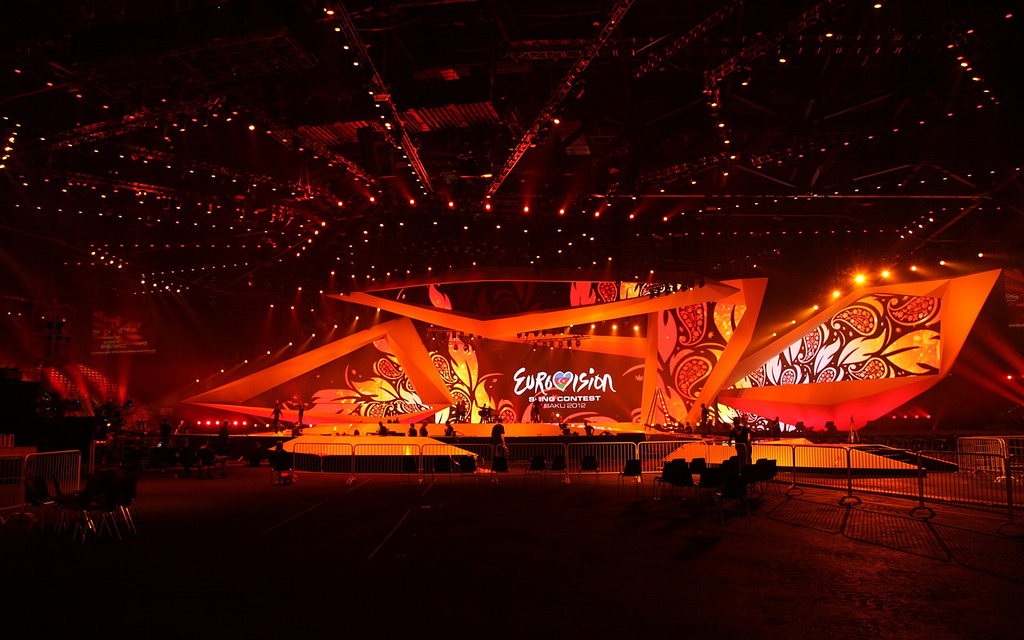
The Eurovision Song Contest 2012 took place at the Baku Crystal Hall in Baku, Azerbaijan.

The Eurovision Song Contest 2012 took place at the Baku Crystal Hall in Baku, Azerbaijan. It consisted of two semi-finals held on 22 and 24 May, respectively, and the grand final on 26 May 2012. According to the Eurovision rules, all participating countries, except the host nation and the "Big Five", consisting of France, Germany, Italy, Spain and the United Kingdom, were required to qualify from one of the two semi-finals to compete for the grand final; the top 10 countries from the respective semi-finals would proceed to the final.

On 25 January 2012, an allocation draw was held at the Buta Palace in Baku that placed each country into one of the two semi-finals; Greece was placed into the first half of the first semi-final, to be held on 22 May. Once all the competing songs for the Eurovision Song Contest 2012 had been released, the running order for the semi-finals was decided by another draw, which was held on 20 March. The nation was assigned to perform at position three, following Iceland and preceding Latvia.

=== Performances ===
Eleftheriou performed "Aphrodisiac" in the first semi-final on 22 May 2012, appearing third out of the 18 countries. The choreography used during the performance was different from the entry's initial performance at Ellinikós Telikós 2012. The two male back-up dancers were replaced by two women and more emphasis was placed on her movements when she sung the lyric "maniac". The performance saw Eleftheriou, her backing vocalists and dancers dressed casually, with the stage's LED screens set to light and dark blue tones with golden structures, including a large golden shell. The choreography for the performance was organized by Konstantinos Rigos, who also served in that role for Greece the previous year. At the end of voting, Greece placed fourth with 116 points, thus qualifying for the grand final. The public awarded Greece fifth place with 110 points and the jury awarded the nation third place with 103 points.

During the winners press conference for the first semi-final qualifiers, Greece was drawn to compete 16th in the grand final. This placed the nation after the performance of Denmark and before that of Sweden. In the final, held on 26 May 2012, Greece placed 17th out of the 26 participants, scoring 64 points. The public awarded Greece ninth place with 89 points and the jury awarded the nation 18th place with 60 points.

=== Voting ===
Below is a breakdown of points awarded to Greece in the first semi-final and final of the Eurovision Song Contest 2012, as well as by the country in the semi-final and final, respectively.

==== Points awarded to Greece ====
Points awarded to Greece (Semi-final 1)
Score	Country
12 points	Cyprus; Romania
10 points	Azerbaijan; Ireland; Moldova; Montenegro
8 points	Albania; Belgium
7 points	San Marino
6 points	
5 points	Iceland; Italy; Russia
4 points	Denmark
3 points	Israel; Spain; Switzerland
2 points	
1 point	Austria

Points awarded to Greece (Final)
Score	Country
12 points	Albania; Cyprus
10 points	
8 points	Romania
7 points	
6 points	
5 points	Azerbaijan; Ukraine
4 points	Moldova; Serbia
3 points	Russia; Turkey
2 points	Belgium; Israel
1 point	Bosnia and Herzegovina; Bulgaria; Georgia; Germany

==== Points awarded by Greece ====
Points awarded by Greece (Semi-final 1)
Score	Country
12 points	Cyprus
10 points	Albania
8 points	Romania
7 points	Russia
6 points	Moldova
5 points	Iceland
4 points	Belgium
3 points	Ireland
2 points	San Marino
1 point	Denmark

Points awarded by Greece (Final)
Score	Country
12 points	Cyprus
10 points	Albania
8 points	Serbia
7 points	Romania
6 points	Sweden
5 points	Azerbaijan
4 points	Russia
3 points	Italy
2 points	Moldova
1 point	Ukraine
