= Italy in the Eurovision Song Contest 2012 =

- Eurovision Song Contest 2012
- Participating broadcaster: Radiotelevisione italiana (RAI)
- Country: Italy
- Selection process: Artist: Sanremo Music Festival 2012; Song: Internal selection
- Selection date: Artist: 18 February 2012; Song: 13 March 2012

Competing entry
- Song: "L'amore è femmina (Out of Love)"
- Artist: Nina Zilli
- Songwriters: Charlie Mason; Christian Rabb; Kristoffer Sjökvist; Frida Molander; Nina Zilli

Placement
- Final result: 9th, 101 points

Participation chronology

Italy was represented at the Eurovision Song Contest 2012 with the song "L'amore è femmina (Out of Love)", written by Charlie Mason, Christian Rabb, Kristoffer Sjökvist, Frida Molander, and Nina Zilli, and performed by Nina Zilli herself. The Italian participating broadcaster, Radiotelevisione italiana (RAI), internally selected its entry for the contest. The artist was selected by a special committee from the participants of the Sanremo Music Festival 2012 and the song selection was carried out by the artist. The song placed 9th in the final, scoring 101 points.

== Internal selection ==
=== Artist selection ===
On 16 January 2012, Italian broadcaster Radiotelevisione italiana (RAI) confirmed that the performer that would represent Italy at the Eurovision Song Contest 2012 would be selected by a special committee from the competing artists at the Sanremo Music Festival 2012. The competition took place between 14–18 February 2012 with the winner being selected on the last day of the festival. The competing artists in the "Big Artists" and "Newcomers" category were:

==== "Big Artists" Category ====
- Arisa
- Chiara Civello
- Dolcenera
- Emma Marrone
- Eugenio Finardi
- Francesco Renga
- Gigi D'Alessio and Loredana Bertè
- Irene Fornaciari
- Marlene Kuntz
- Matia Bazar
- Nina Zilli
- Noemi
- Pierdavide Carone and Lucio Dalla
- Samuele Bersani

==== "Newcomers" Category ====
- Alessandro Casillo
- Bidiel
- Celeste Gaia
- Erica Mou
- Giordana Angi
- Giulia Anania
- Iohosemprevoglia
- Marco Guazzone

During the final evening of the Sanremo Music Festival 2012, Nina Zilli was announced as the artist that would represent Italy at the Eurovision Song Contest 2012. Emma Marrone was selected as the winner with the song "Non è l'inferno".

=== Song selection ===
On 3 March 2012, RAI confirmed that Nina Zilli would perform her Sanremo Music Festival 2012 song "Per sempre" at the Eurovision Song Contest 2012. However, RAI later confirmed on 13 March 2012 that Zilli would perform "L'amore è femmina (Out of Love)" at the Eurovision Song Contest 2012 instead.

== At Eurovision ==
Italy automatically qualified to compete in the final on 26 May 2012 as part of the "Big Five". Italy was drawn to perform tenth, after France and preceding Estonia. Italy achieved 9th place with 101 points, finishing in the top ten for a second consecutive year. The televote awarded Italy 17th place with 56 points and the jury awarded 4th place with 157 points.

=== Voting ===
==== Points awarded to Italy ====
Points awarded to Italy (Final)
| Score | Country |
|---|---|
| 12 points | |
| 10 points | Malta |
| 8 points | |
| 7 points | Albania; Estonia; San Marino |
| 6 points | |
| 5 points | Hungary; Macedonia; Moldova; Slovakia; Slovenia; Switzerland |
| 4 points | Georgia; Israel; Lithuania; Norway; Ukraine |
| 3 points | Denmark; Greece |
| 2 points | Croatia; Cyprus; Germany; Ireland; Montenegro; Portugal |
| 1 point | France; Spain |

==== Points awarded by Italy ====
Points awarded by Italy (Semi-final 1)
| Score | Country |
|---|---|
| 12 points | Albania |
| 10 points | Romania |
| 8 points | Switzerland |
| 7 points | Cyprus |
| 6 points | Denmark |
| 5 points | Greece |
| 4 points | Moldova |
| 3 points | San Marino |
| 2 points | Russia |
| 1 point | Iceland |

Points awarded by Italy (Final)
| Score | Country |
|---|---|
| 12 points | Albania |
| 10 points | Russia |
| 8 points | Germany |
| 7 points | Romania |
| 6 points | Serbia |
| 5 points | Cyprus |
| 4 points | Moldova |
| 3 points | Ukraine |
| 2 points | Denmark |
| 1 point | Macedonia |

==== Detailed voting results from Italy ====
Televoting results from Italy (Semi-final 1)
| R/O | Country | Percentage of Votes | Rank | Points (Televote) |
|---|---|---|---|---|
| 01 | Montenegro | 1.54% | 15 | |
| 02 | Iceland | 3.9% | 8 | 3 |
| 03 | Greece | 4.67% | 6 | 5 |
| 04 | Latvia | 2% | 14 | |
| 05 | Albania | 13.87% | 2 | 10 |
| 06 | Romania | 27.22% | 1 | 12 |
| 07 | Switzerland | 4.61% | 7 | 4 |
| 08 | Belgium | 0.77% | 18 | |
| 09 | Finland | 2.52% | 11 | |
| 10 | Israel | 2.19% | 12 | |
| 11 | San Marino | 8.55% | 4 | 7 |
| 12 | Cyprus | 3.8% | 9 | 2 |
| 13 | Denmark | 1.25% | 17 | |
| 14 | Russia | 6.32% | 5 | 6 |
| 15 | Hungary | 2.09% | 13 | |
| 16 | Austria | 1.36% | 16 | |
| 17 | Moldova | 9.97% | 3 | 8 |
| 18 | Ireland | 3.38% | 10 | 1 |

Televoting results from Italy (Final)
| R/O | Country | Percentage of Votes | Rank | Points (Televote) |
|---|---|---|---|---|
| 01 | United Kingdom | 0.46% | 25 | |
| 02 | Hungary | 0.66% | 22 | |
| 03 | Albania | 12.92% | 2 | 10 |
| 04 | Lithuania | 2.36% | 12 | |
| 05 | Bosnia and Herzegovina | 1.43% | 16 | |
| 06 | Russia | 5.23% | 5 | 6 |
| 07 | Iceland | 1.74% | 15 | |
| 08 | Cyprus | 1.86% | 14 | |
| 09 | France | 0.65% | 23 | |
| 10 | Italy | | | |
| 11 | Estonia | 1.05% | 20 | |
| 12 | Norway | 0.61% | 24 | |
| 13 | Azerbaijan | 0.68% | 21 | |
| 14 | Romania | 28.32% | 1 | 12 |
| 15 | Denmark | 1.25% | 17 | |
| 16 | Greece | 2.28% | 13 | |
| 17 | Sweden | 3.12% | 8 | 3 |
| 18 | Turkey | 2.79% | 9 | 2 |
| 19 | Spain | 2.38% | 11 | |
| 20 | Germany | 2.43% | 10 | 1 |
| 21 | Malta | 1.25% | 18 | |
| 22 | Macedonia | 3.66% | 6 | 5 |
| 23 | Ireland | 1.13% | 19 | |
| 24 | Serbia | 7.39% | 4 | 7 |
| 25 | Ukraine | 3.13% | 7 | 4 |
| 26 | Moldova | 11.22% | 3 | 8 |
