= Russia in the Eurovision Song Contest 2012 =

- Eurovision Song Contest 2012
- Country: Russia
- Selection process: Evrovidenie 2012
- Selection date: 7 March 2012

Competing entry
- Song: "Party for Everybody"
- Artist: Buranovskiye Babushki
- Songwriters: Viktor Drobysh; Timofei Leontiev; Olga Tuktaryova; Mary Susan Applegate

Placement
- Semi-final result: Qualified (1st, 152 points)
- Final result: 2nd, 259 points

Participation chronology

Russia was represented at the Eurovision Song Contest 2012 with the song "Party for Everybody", written by Viktor Drobysh, Timofei Leontiev, Olga Tuktaryova, and Mary Susan Applegate, and performed by Buranovskiye Babushki. The Russian entry was selected through a national final, Evrovidenie 2012 (Russian: Евровидение 2012), organised by the Russian broadcaster RTR. Russia qualified from the first semi-final and went on to place 2nd in the final, scoring 259 points.

== Before Eurovision ==
=== Evrovidenie 2012 ===
Evrovidenie 2012 was the seventh edition of Evrovidenie, the music competition that selects Russia's entry for the Eurovision Song Contest. The show took place on 7 March 2012 at the Akademicheskiy Concert Hall in Moscow and hosted by Olga Shelest and Mikhail Zelenskiy. Twenty-five artists and songs participated and the winner was selected through a jury and a public televote. The show was broadcast on Russia-1, RTR-Planeta as well as online via the broadcaster's website vesti.ru and the official Eurovision Song Contest website eurovision.tv.

==== Competing entries ====
On 28 December 2011, RTR announced a submission period for interested artists and composers to submit their entries until 10 February 2012. The broadcaster received 150 submissions at the conclusion of the deadline. Between 35 and 40 entries were selected from the received submissions to proceed to auditions held on 29 February 2012 where a jury panel selected the twenty-five finalists for the national final. The competing acts were announced on 1 March 2012 and among the competing artists were Eurovision Song Contest 2008 winner Dima Bilan, 2003 Russian Eurovision entrant as part of T.A.T.u. Julia Volkova, and 2006 Belarusian Eurovision entrant Polina Smolova.

| Artist | Song | Songwriter(s) |
|---|---|---|
| 4POST | "Navstrechu nebu" (Навстречу небу) | Alexander Makhalev, Dima Bikbaev |
| Buranovskiye Babushki | "Party for Everybody" | Viktor Drobysh, Timofei Leontiev, Olga Tuktaryova, Mary Susan Applegate |
| Chinkong ft. Karina | "High Up" | Vladimir Chinyaev, Karina Poroshkova |
| Dima Bilan and Julia Volkova | "Back to Her Future" | Niclas Molinder, Joacim Persson, Johan Alkenäs, Lil' Eddie |
| Ed Shulzhevskiy | "Sto minut" (Сто минут) | Denis Maidanov |
| Efrosiya | "Ya tebya lyubila" (Я тебя любила) | Oleg Ivanov, Valery Proskuryakov |
| Elena Ekimova | "Do You Like?" | Alexei Ismailov |
| Farinelli Balls | "Breath Away Song" | Juliana Savchenko, Sergey Demyaneko |
| Irson Kudikova | "Woman's Heart Never Lies" | Irson Kudikova |
| Jet Kids | "Oh Yeah" | Alina Ershovy, Maria Ershovy, Tonya Karpinskaya |
| Katya Savelieva | "Life's Beautiful" | Viktor Drobysh, Katya Savelieva |
| Ksenona | "Close My Eyes" | Leonid Vorobyev, Joby Osman |
| Lena Maksimova | "Brave" | Didrik Thott, Henrik Nordenback, Christian Fast |
| Marie Carné | "Mezhdu nebom i zemlyoy" (Между небом и землёй) | Kim Breitburg, Evgeny Muravyov |
| Mark Tishman | "Money vs Love" | Andrey Misin, Karen Kavaleryan |
| Olga Makovetskaya | "Positive Emotions" | Natalia Lapteva |
| Pavla | "One Million Butterflies" | Denis Kovalsky, Lene Dissing, Marcus Winther-John |
| Polina Smolova | "Michael" | Sergey Sukhomlin, Andrey Kostyugov, Yana Startseva |
| Rene | "I Miss You" | Renata Baikova, Alexander Kryukov |
| Riff Action Family | "Sky" | Stanislav Gordeev, Sergey Chugunov, Kirill Dmitriev, Ivan Ponkin |
| Sardor | "Believe" | Ivan Kit |
| Syostry Syo | "Une marionette" | Alexander Semin, Ekaterina Frolova |
| The Ups! | "Kiss" | Wif Newt, Bas Eiridt |
| Timati and Aida Garifullina | "Fantasy" | Timothy Mosley |
| Unite It | "Filling My Life" | Evgeny Gor, Evgeny Chistov, Maxim Dorbeko, Ilya Ermakov |

==== Final ====
The final took place on 7 March 2012. Twenty-five entries competed and the winner, "Party for Everybody" performed by Buranovskiye Babushki, was determined through a 50/50 combination of votes from a jury panel and public televoting. The jury consisted of Sergey Arhipov (deputy director of Radio Mayak), Igor Krutoy (composer), Alexander Igudin (director and producer), Philipp Kirkorov (1995 Russian Eurovision entrant), Arman Davletyarov (media manager), Roman Emelyanov (program director of Russkoye Radio) and Gennady Gokhshtein (executive entertainment producer of Russia-1). In addition to the performances of the competing entries, 2009 and 2011 Russian Junior Eurovision entrant Katya Ryabova and 2008 Ukrainian Eurovision entrant Ani Lorak performed as guests.

Final – 7 March 2012
| R/O | Artist | Song | Points | Place |
|---|---|---|---|---|
| 1 | Lena Maksimova | "Brave" | 4.96 | 13 |
| 2 | Ksenona | "Close My Eyes" | 4.02 | 21 |
| 3 | Irson Kudikova | "Woman's Heart Never Lies" | 4.15 | 19 |
| 4 | The Ups! | "Kiss" | 5.00 | 12 |
| 5 | Sardor | "Believe" | 3.46 | 24 |
| 6 | 4POST | "Navstrechu nebu" | 6.32 | 6 |
| 7 | Efrosiya | "Ya tebya lyubila" | 4.06 | 20 |
| 8 | Unite It | "Filling My Life" | 4.44 | 16 |
| 9 | Katya Savelieva | "Life's Beautiful" | 5.32 | 9 |
| 10 | Olga Makovetskaya | "Positive Emotions" | 4.52 | 15 |
| 11 | Rene | "I Miss You" | 4.28 | 17 |
| 12 | Farinelli Balls | "Breath Away Song" | 5.06 | 11 |
| 13 | Polina Smolova | "Michael" | 5.79 | 7 |
| 14 | Chinkong ft. Karina | "High Up" | 4.68 | 14 |
| 15 | Marie Carné | "Mezhdu nebom i zemlyoy" | 4.24 | 18 |
| 16 | Mark Tishman | "Money vs Love" | 6.73 | 5 |
| 17 | Ed Shulzhevskiy | "Sto minut" | 3.65 | 23 |
| 18 | Elena Ekimova | "Do You Like?" | 5.58 | 8 |
| 19 | Dima Bilan and Julia Volkova | "Back to Her Future" | 29.25 | 2 |
| 20 | Riff Action Family | "Sky" | 5.09 | 10 |
| 21 | Timati and Aida Garifullina | "Fantasy" | 26.74 | 3 |
| 22 | Pavla | "One Million Butterflies" | 3.93 | 22 |
| 23 | Syostry Syo | "Une marionette" | 6.98 | 4 |
| 24 | Buranovskiye Babushki | "Party for Everybody" | 38.51 | 1 |
| 25 | Jet Kids | "Oh Yeah" | 3.23 | 25 |

== At Eurovision ==
Russia competed in the second half of the first semi-final (14th on stage), on 22 May 2012, following Denmark and preceding Hungary. Buranovskiye Babushki received 152 points and placed 1st, thus qualifying for the final on 26 May. The public awarded Russia 1st place with 189 points and the jury awarded 8th place with 75 points.

In the final, Russia was drawn to perform 6th, after Bosnia and Herzegovina and preceding Iceland. The Russian entry scored a total of 259 points and placed 2nd in the final. The public awarded Russia 2nd place with 332 points and the jury awarded 11th place with 94 points.

=== Voting ===
==== Points awarded to Russia ====
Points awarded to Russia (Semi-final 1)
| Score | Country |
|---|---|
| 12 points | Belgium; Denmark; Finland; Israel; Latvia |
| 10 points | Austria |
| 8 points | Azerbaijan; Ireland; Montenegro; Switzerland |
| 7 points | Cyprus; Greece; Hungary; Spain |
| 6 points | Iceland; Moldova; Romania |
| 5 points | |
| 4 points | |
| 3 points | |
| 2 points | Italy; San Marino |
| 1 point | |

Points awarded to Russia (Final)
| Score | Country |
|---|---|
| 12 points | Belarus |
| 10 points | Azerbaijan; Italy; Latvia; San Marino; Ukraine |
| 8 points | Belgium; Denmark; Estonia; Finland; Norway; Portugal; Slovenia; Spain |
| 7 points | Germany; Hungary; Iceland; Israel; Serbia; Sweden; Turkey |
| 6 points | Bulgaria; Croatia; Ireland; Lithuania; Moldova |
| 5 points | Austria; Cyprus; Georgia |
| 4 points | France; Greece; Macedonia; Montenegro; Netherlands; Romania |
| 3 points | Albania; Bosnia and Herzegovina; Malta; Slovakia; United Kingdom |
| 2 points | |
| 1 point | |

==== Points awarded by Russia ====
Points awarded by Russia (Semi-final 1)
| Score | Country |
|---|---|
| 12 points | Moldova |
| 10 points | Ireland |
| 8 points | Romania |
| 7 points | Cyprus |
| 6 points | Israel |
| 5 points | Greece |
| 4 points | Latvia |
| 3 points | Denmark |
| 2 points | Albania |
| 1 point | Iceland |

Points awarded by Russia (Final)
| Score | Country |
|---|---|
| 12 points | Sweden |
| 10 points | Azerbaijan |
| 8 points | Ukraine |
| 7 points | Moldova |
| 6 points | Estonia |
| 5 points | Lithuania |
| 4 points | Serbia |
| 3 points | Greece |
| 2 points | Cyprus |
| 1 point | Romania |
