= Albania in the Eurovision Song Contest 2012 =

- Eurovision Song Contest 2012
- Participating broadcaster: Radio Televizioni Shqiptar (RTSH)
- Country: Albania
- Selection process: Festivali i Këngës 50
- Selection date: 29 December 2011

Competing entry
- Song: "Suus"
- Artist: Rona Nishliu
- Songwriters: Florent Boshnjaku; Rona Nishliu

Placement
- Semi-final result: Qualified (2nd, 146 points)
- Final result: 5th, 146 points

Participation chronology

Albania was represented at the Eurovision Song Contest 2012 with the song "Suus", written by Florent Boshnjaku and Rona Nishliu, and performed by Rona Nishliu. The Albanian participating broadcaster, Radio Televizioni Shqiptar (RTSH), selected its entry through the national selection competition Festivali i Këngës in December 2011. To this point, RTSH had participated in the Eurovision Song Contest eight times since its first entry in 2004. Prior to the contest, the song was promoted by a music video and live performances in Cyprus, Hungary, Montenegro, Romania and the Netherlands.

Albania was drawn to compete in the first semi-final of the Eurovision Song Contest 2012, which took place on 22 May 2012. Performing as number five, the nation was announced among the top 10 entries of the first semi-final and therefore qualified to compete in the grand final. In the final on 26 May 2012, it performed as number three and placed fifth out of the 26 participating countries, scoring 146 points. This marked the best placing of Albania in the history of the contest.

== Background ==
Prior to the 2012 contest, Radio Televizioni Shqiptar (RTSH) had participated in the Eurovision Song Contest representing Albania eight times since its first entry in 2004. Its highest placing, to this point, had been the seventh place, achieved in 2004 with the song "The Image of You" performed by Anjeza Shahini. During its tenure in the contest, Albania failed to qualify for the final three times, with the 2011 entry being the most recent non-qualifier.

As part of its duties as participating broadcaster, RTSH organises the selection of its entry in the Eurovision Song Contest and broadcasts the event in the country. RTSH has organised Festivali i Këngës since its inauguration in 1962. Since 2003, the winner of the competition has simultaneously won the right to represent Albania in the Eurovision Song Contest.

== Before Eurovision ==
=== Festivali i Këngës ===
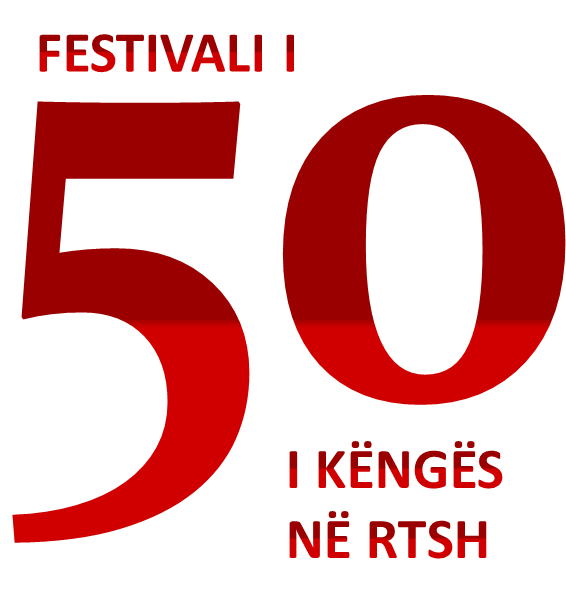
The official logo of the 50th edition of Festivali i Këngës. The competition was organised to select Albania's entry for the Eurovision Song Contest 2012.

RTSH organised the 50th edition of Festivali i Këngës in order to select its entry for the Eurovision Song Contest 2012. The competition consisted of two semi-finals on 26 and 27 December, respectively, and the grand final on 29 December 2011. The three live shows were hosted by Albanian television presenter Enkeleida Zeko, Albanian model Hygerta Sako and Albanian actor Nik Xhelilaj. In October 2011, the broadcaster published a provisory list of 28 competing artists that were shortlisted to compete in the two semi-finals of the contest. In December, a few days prior to the scheduled live shows, RTSH ultimately released the songs and composers of the competing artists.

==== Competing entries ====
Competing entries
Artist(s)	Song	Songwriter(s)
Altin Goci	"Kthehëm prapë"	Altin Goci; K. Shehu
Bashkim Alibali	"Këngën time merr vehtë"	Bashkim Alibali; Jorgo Papingji
Bojken Lako and Breza	"Të zakonshëm"	Bojken Lako
Claudio La Regina	"Kur të pasha"	Flli Scaravaglione; Claudio La Regina
Dr. Flori	"Personale"	Dr. Flori
Elhaida Dani	"Mijëra vjet"	Endri Sina; Sokol Marsi
Elton Deda	"Kristal"	Elton Deda; Sokol Marsi
Endri and Stefi Prifti	"Iluzion"	Voltan Prodani; Timo Flloko
Entela Zhula	"Ndjehem bosh"	Edmond Veizaj; Entela Zhula
Evans Rama	"Ti nuk mundesh"	Fabian Asllani; I. Hoxha
Frederik Ndoci	"Oh, jeta ime"	Lejla Agolli; Frederik Ndoci
Gerta Mahmutaj	"Pyete zemrën"	Flamur Shehu; Rozana Radi
Goldi Halili	"Rroj për dashurinë"	Fatrin Krajka; Agim Doçi
Herciana Matmuja	"Aty ku më le"	Shpëtim Kushta; Agron Tufa
Iris Hoxha	"Pa ty"	Edmon Rrapi; L. Shqiponja
Kamela Islamaj	"Mbi yje"	Alban Male; I. Sojli
Kujtim Prodani	"Digjem"	Kujtim Prodani; A. Biba
Mariza Ikonomi	"Më ler të të dua"	Sokol Marsi; Jorgo Papingji
Marjeta Billo	"Vlen sa një jetë"	Klodian Qafoku; Arben Duka
Marsida Saraçi	"Eja më merr"	Enis Mullaj; Arbër Arapi
Orinda Huta	"Dorëzohem"	Alban Kondi; Turjan Hyska
Rona Nishliu	"Suus"	Florent Boshnjaku; Rona Nishliu
Rudina Delia	"Më kërko"	Luan Zhegu; Rudina Delia
Saimir Braho	"Ajër"	Ilir Dangellia; I. Kurti; Saimir Braho
Samanta Karavello	"Zgjomë një tjetër ëndërr"	Gent Myftaraj; Pandi Laço
Sindi Berisha	"Braktisur"	Kristi Popa; P. Truja
Toni Mehmetaj	"Ëndrra e parë"	Edmond Zhulali; Agim Doçi
Xhensila Myrtezaj	"Lulet mbledh për hënën"	Genti Lako; Perikli Papingji

==== Shows ====
===== Semi-finals =====
The two semi-finals of Festivali i Këngës took place on 26 December and 27 December 2011, and were broadcast live at 20:30 (CET) on the respective dates. 14 songs competed in each semi-final, with 10 entries in the first and second semi-final, respectively, qualifying for the grand final. The interval acts for the semi-finals featured guest performances by Nigerian singer Eddy Wata and English singer Katherine Ellis.

Semi-final 1 – 26 December 2011
R/O	Artist(s)	Song	Result
1	Gerta Mahmutaj	"Pyete zemrën"	Qualified
2	Entela Zhula	"Ndjehem Bosh"	—N/a
3	Bashkim Alibali	"Këngën time merr vehtë"	Qualified
4	Samanta Karavello	"Zgjomë një tjetër ëndërr"	Qualified
5	Endri and Stefi Prifti	"Iluzion"	Qualified
6	Rona Nishliu	"Suus"	Qualified
7	Rudina Delia	"Më kërko"	Qualified
8	Marjeta Billo	"Vlen sa një jetë"	Qualified
9	Claudio La Regina	"Kur të pasha"	—N/a
10	Herciana Matmuja	"Aty ku më le"	Qualified
11	Orinda Huta	"Dorëzohem"	—N/a
12	Altin Goci	"Kthehem prap"	Qualified
13	Elton Deda	"Kristal"	Qualified
14	Evans Rama	"Ti nuk mundesh"	—N/a

Semi-final 2 – 27 December 2011
R/O	Artist(s)	Song	Result
1	Toni Mehmetaj	"Ëndrra e parë"	Qualified
2	Dr. Flori	"Personale"	Qualified
3	Kamela Islamaj	"Mbi yje"	Qualified
4	Frederik Ndoci	"Oh, jeta ime"	Qualified
5	Marsida Saraçi	"Eja më merr"	—N/a
6	Bojken Lako and Breza	"Të zakonshëm"	Qualified
7	Sindi Berisha	"Braktisur"	—N/a
8	Mariza Ikonomi	"Më ler të të dua"	Qualified
9	Kujtim Prodani	"Digjem"	—N/a
10	Iris Hoxha	"Pa ty"	Qualified
11	Saimir Braho	"Ajër"	Qualified
12	Goldi Halili	"Rroj për dashurinë"	—N/a
13	Xhensila Myrtezaj	"Lulet mbledh për hënën"	Qualified
14	Elhaida Dani	"Mijëra vjet"	Qualified

===== Final =====
The grand final of Festivali i Këngës took place on 29 December 2011 and was broadcast live at 20:30 (CET). The winner was determined by the combination of the votes from a seven-member jury, consisting of Aldo Shllaku, Edi Xhani, Ndriçim Xhepa, Redon Makashi, Robert R, Zana Shuteriqi and Zhani Ciko. Each member of the jury voted by assigning scores from 1–8, 10 and 12 points to their preferred songs. Rona Nishliu emerged as the winner and was simultaneously announced as the country's representative for the Eurovision Song Contest 2012. The results of the final are summarised in the table below:

Final – 29 December 2011
R/O	Artist(s)	Song	Points	Result
1	Bojken Lako and Breza	"Të zakonshëm"	18	10
2	Saimir Braho	"Ajër"	50	3
3	Marjeta Billo	"Vlen sa një jetë"	0	14
4	Herciana Matmuja	"Aty ku më le"	0	14
5	Xhensila Myrtezaj	"Lulet mbledh për hënën"	8	13
6	Toni Mehmetaj	"Ëndërra e parë"	10	12
7	Iris Hoxha	"Pa ty"	19	9
8	Gerta Mahmutaj	"Pyete zemrën"	0	14
9	Bashkim Alibali	"Këngën time merr vehtë"	0	14
10	Altin Goci	"Kthehem prapë"	38	5
11	Elton Deda	"Kristal"	55	2
12	Endri and Stefi Prifti	"Iluzion"	25	6
13	Rona Nishliu	"Suus"	77	1
14	Kamela Islamaj	"Mbi yje"	25	6
15	Frederik Ndoci	"Oh, jeta ime"	0	14
16	Mariza Ikonomi	"Më ler të të dua"	13	11
17	Elhaida Dani	"Mijëra vjet"	0	14
18	Rudina Delia	"Më kërko"	0	14
19	Samanta Karavello	"Zgjomë një tjetër ëndërr"	47	4
20	Dr. Flori	"Personale"	21	8

Detailed jury voting results
R/O	Song	A. Shllaku	E. Xhani	N. Xhepa	R. Makashi	Robert R.	Z. Ciko	Z. Shuteriqi	Points
1	"Të zakonshëm"	4	0	0	8	0	2	4	18
2	"Ajër"	6	10	10	6	2	8	8	50
3	"Vlen sa një jetë"	0	0	0	0	0	0	0	0
4	"Aty ku më le"	0	0	0	0	0	0	0	0
5	"Lulet mbledh për hënën"	0	0	2	0	6	0	0	8
6	"Ëndërra e parë"	0	1	0	1	1	4	3	10
7	"Pa ty"	2	5	1	3	0	7	1	19
8	"Pyete zemrën"	0	0	0	0	0	0	0	0
9	"Këngën time merr vehtë"	0	0	0	0	0	0	0	0
10	"Kthehem prapë"	1	4	6	4	12	5	6	38
11	"Kristal"	5	7	8	10	5	10	10	55
12	"Iluzion"	3	2	7	5	7	1	0	25
13	"Suus"	12	12	12	7	10	12	12	77
14	"Mbi yje"	7	0	5	0	8	0	5	25
15	"Oh, jeta ime"	0	0	0	0	0	0	0	0
16	"Më ler të të dua"	0	8	0	2	3	0	0	13
17	"Mijëra vjet"	0	0	0	0	0	0	0	0
18	"Më kërko"	0	0	0	0	0	0	0	0
19	"Zgjomë një tjetër ëndërr"	8	6	4	12	4	6	7	47
20	"Personale"	10	3	3	0	0	3	2	21

=== Promotion ===
A music video for "Suus" premiered via the Eurovision Song Contest's official YouTube channel of the Eurovision Song Contest on 17 March 2012. For promotional purposes, Nishliu embarked on a small tour with live performances at various at various events related to the contest, including in Cyprus, Hungary, Montenegro, Romania and the Netherlands.

== At Eurovision ==
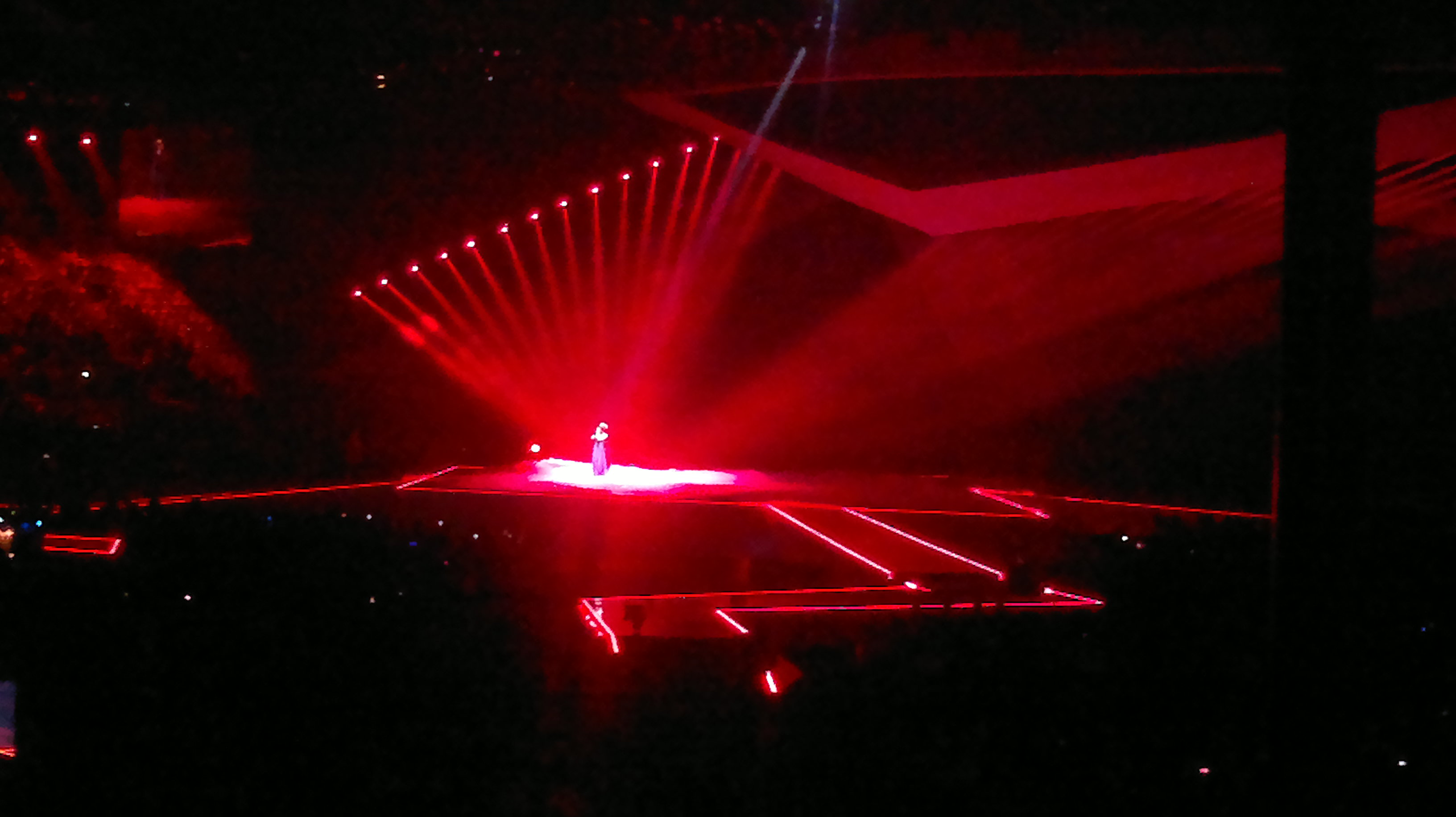
Rona Nishliu performing during the first semi-final of the Eurovision Song Contest 2012.

The Eurovision Song Contest 2012 took place at Baku Crystal Hall in Baku, Azerbaijan, and consisted of two semi-finals held on 22 and 24 May, respectively, and the grand final on 26 May 2012. According to the Eurovision rules, all participating countries, apart from the host nation and the "Big Five", consisting of France, Germany, Italy, Spain and the United Kingdom, were required to qualify from one of the two semi-finals to compete for the final, although the top 10 countries from the respective semi-final progress to the grand final.

On 25 January 2012, a special allocation draw was held at the Buta Palace in Baku that placed each country into one of the two semi-finals, as well as which half of the show they would perform in. Albania was placed into the first semi-final, to be held on 22 May, and was scheduled to perform in the first half of the show. Once all the competing songs for the 2012 contest had been released, the running order for the semi-finals was decided by the producers of the contest rather than through another draw, for preventing similar songs being placed next to each other; Albania was set to perform in position 5, following Romania and preceding Belgium.

At the end of the show, the country was announced among the top 10 entries in the first semi-final and therefore qualified to compete in the grand final. Soon after the first semi-final, it was announced that it would be performing third in the grand final, following Hungary and preceding Lithuania.

=== Voting ===
The tables below visualise a breakdown of points awarded to Albania in both the first semi-final and the grand final of the Eurovision Song Contest 2012, as well as by the country on both occasions. In the semi-final, the country finished in second place with a total of 146 points, including 12 from Austria, Azerbaijan, Italy, Montenegro and Switzerland. In the final, Albania finished in fifth position, being awarded a total of 146 points, including 12 awarded by Italy, Macedonia, San Marino and Switzerland. Albania awarded its 12 points to Montenegro in the semi-final, and to Greece in the final of the contest.

==== Points awarded to Albania ====
Points awarded to Albania (Semi-final 1)
Score	Country
12 points	Austria; Azerbaijan; Italy; Montenegro; Switzerland
10 points	Belgium; Cyprus; Greece; Hungary; San Marino
8 points	
7 points	Denmark
6 points	
5 points	Finland; Israel
4 points	Latvia; Romania; Spain
3 points	Iceland
2 points	Russia
1 point	Ireland; Moldova

Points awarded to Albania (Final)
Score	Country
12 points	Italy; Macedonia; San Marino; Switzerland
10 points	Belgium; Greece; Montenegro
8 points	Austria; Hungary
7 points	
6 points	Bosnia and Herzegovina; Finland; Germany
5 points	Croatia; Denmark; Turkey
4 points	Bulgaria; Cyprus
3 points	Georgia; Slovenia
2 points	
1 point	Latvia; Malta; Romania; Serbia; Sweden

==== Points awarded by Albania ====
Points awarded by Albania (Semi-final 1)
Score	Country
12 points	Montenegro
10 points	San Marino
8 points	Greece
7 points	Hungary
6 points	Cyprus
5 points	Romania
4 points	Moldova
3 points	Switzerland
2 points	Belgium
1 point	Finland

Points awarded by Albania (Final)
Score	Country
12 points	Greece
10 points	Turkey
8 points	Macedonia
7 points	Italy
6 points	Cyprus
5 points	Sweden
4 points	Azerbaijan
3 points	Russia
2 points	Germany
1 point	Serbia
