= Cyprus in the Eurovision Song Contest 2012 =

- Eurovision Song Contest 2012
- Participating broadcaster: Cyprus Broadcasting Corporation (CyBC)
- Country: Cyprus
- Selection process: Artist: Internal selection Song: A Song for Ivi
- Selection date: Artist: 5 August 2011; Song: 25 January 2012

Competing entry
- Song: "La La Love"
- Artist: Ivi Adamou
- Songwriters: Alex Papaconstantinou; Björn Djupström; Alexandra Zakka; Viktor Svensson

Placement
- Semi-final result: Qualified (7th, 91 points)
- Final result: 16th, 65 points

Participation chronology

Cyprus was represented at the Eurovision Song Contest 2012 with the song "La La Love" written by Alex Papaconstantinou, Björn Djupström, Alexandra Zakka and Viktor Svensson. The song was performed by Ivi Adamou, who was selected by the Cypriot broadcaster Cyprus Broadcasting Corporation (CyBC) in August 2011 to represent Cyprus at the 2012 contest in Baku, Azerbaijan. CyBC organised the national final A Song for Ivi on 25 January 2012 to select the Cypriot song. The national final featured three songs and resulted in the selection of "La La Love" as the winning song.

Cyprus was drawn to compete in the first semi-final of the Eurovision Song Contest which took place on 22 May 2012. Performing during the show in position 12, "La La Love" was announced among the top 10 entries of the first semi-final and therefore qualified to compete in the final on 23 May. It was later revealed that Cyprus placed seventh out of the 18 participating countries in the semi-final with 91 points. In the final, Cyprus performed in position 8 and placed sixteenth out of the 26 participating countries, scoring 65 points.

== Background ==
Prior to the 2012 contest, Cyprus had participated in the Eurovision Song Contest twenty-nine times since their debut in the 1981 contest. Its best placing was fifth, which it achieved three times: in the 1982 competition with the song "Mono i agapi" performed by Anna Vissi, in the 1997 edition with "Mana mou" performed by Hara and Andreas Constantinou, and the 2004 contest with "Stronger Every Minute" performed by Lisa Andreas. Cyprus' least successful result was in the 1986 contest when it placed last with the song "Tora zo" by Elpida, receiving only four points in total. However, its worst finish in terms of points received was when it placed second to last in the 1999 contest with "Tha'nai erotas" by Marlain Angelidou, receiving only two points. The nation failed to qualify for the final in 2011 with "San aggelos s'agapisa" performed by Christos Mylordos.

The Cypriot national broadcaster, Cyprus Broadcasting Corporation (CyBC), broadcasts the event within Cyprus and organises the selection process for the nation's entry. CyBC confirmed their intentions to participate at the 2012 Eurovision Song Contest on 5 August 2011. Cyprus has used various methods to select the Cypriot entry in the past, such as internal selections and televised national finals to choose the performer, song or both to compete at Eurovision. In 2011, the broadcaster organised the talent show Performance to select the artist while the song was internally selected. CyBC opted to internally select the artist for the 2012 contest and organise a national final to select the song, a method which was last used by the broadcaster in 2005.

== Before Eurovision ==
=== Artist selection ===
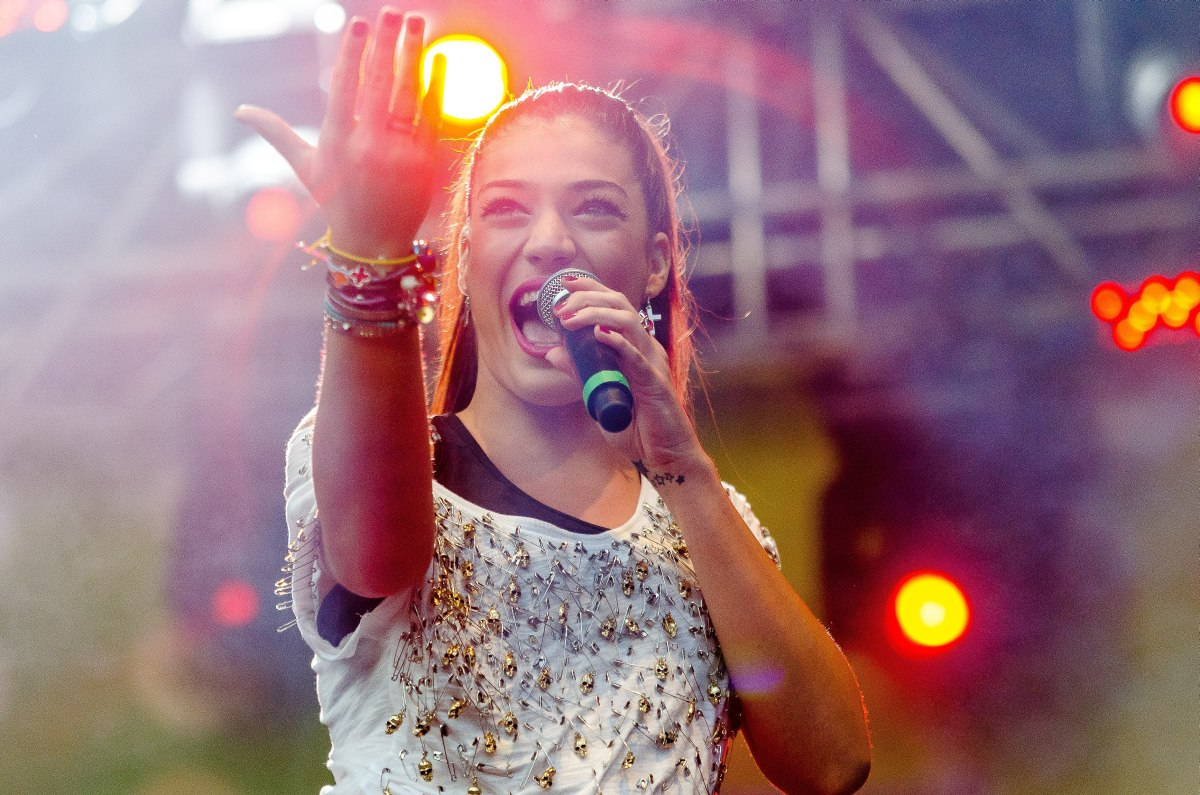
Ivi Adamou was internally selected to represent Cyprus in the Eurovision Song Contest 2012

In early August 2011, it was reported that CyBC had internally selected Ivi Adamou to represent Cyprus in Baku. Adamou was confirmed as the Cypriot artist for the Eurovision Song Contest 2012 on 5 August 2011. On 30 November 2011, CyBC announced that a national final would be held to select her contest song.

=== A Song for Ivi ===
Three songs were selected by Ivi Adamou's record label Sony Music Greece for the national final, which were presented to the public on 6 January 2012 via the MTN Cyprus Facebook page and CyBC's website cybc.cy. The national final, titled A Song for Ivi, took place on 25 January 2012 at the CyBC studios in Nicosia, hosted by Christos Grigoriades and broadcast on RIK 1, RIK sat, RIK Triton as well as online via cybc.cy. All three competing songs were performed by Ivi Adamou and the winning song, "La La Love", was selected by a 50/50 combination of votes from a seven-member jury panel and a public televote. The members of the jury were Denis Perri (RIK Triton), Constantinos Tsioli (ANT1 FM), Polyna Socratous (journalist), Christos Savvides (OGAE Cyprus), Andrew James (allkindsofeverything.ie), Johnny Kalimeris (ERT) and Giorgos Kapoutzidis (actor).

Final – 25 January 2012
R/O	Song	Songwriter(s)	Jury	Televote	Total	Place
1	"Call the Police"	Lene Dissing, Jakob Glæsner, Mikko Tamminen	10	8	18	2
2	"La La Love"	Alex Papaconstantinou, Björn Djupström, Alexandra Zakka, Viktor Svensson	12	12	24	1
3	"You Don't Belong Here"	Niklas Jarl, Alexander Schöld, Sharon Vaughn	8	10	18	2

=== Promotion ===
Following the national final, Ivi Adamou filmed the official preview video for "La La Love" in early March 2012. The video, directed by Apollon Papatheoharis with fashion designs by Fani Xenofontos, was released on 17 March 2012 via the official Eurovision Song Contest website eurovision.tv.

Adamou made several appearances across Europe to specifically promote "La La Love" as the Cypriot Eurovision entry. Adamou performed "La La Love" during the final of the Bulgarian Eurovision national final Bylgarskata pesen za Evroviziya 2012 on 29 February and during the Greek Eurovision national final Ellinikós Telikós 2012 on 12 March. Adamou also took part in promotional activities in Greece where she performed at the Barcode Club in Chios on 30 March, at the W Club in Athens on 31 March, and at the Mousses Club in Agirinio on 6 April. On 19 April, Adamou performed during an event that was organised by the London Greek Radio and held at the Stone Marquee venue in London, United Kingdom.

== At Eurovision ==
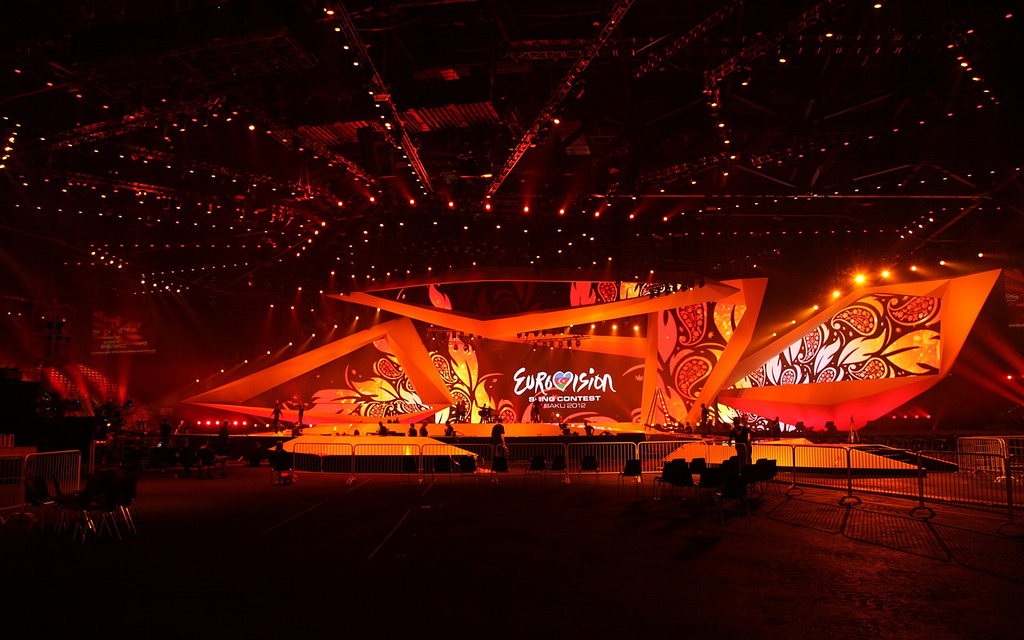
The Eurovision Song Contest 2012 took place at the Baku Crystal Hall in Baku, Azerbaijan

According to Eurovision rules, all nations with the exceptions of the host country and the "Big Five" (France, Germany, Italy, Spain and the United Kingdom) are required to qualify from one of two semi-finals to compete for the final; the top ten countries from each semi-final progress to the final. The European Broadcasting Union (EBU) split up the competing countries into six different pots based on voting patterns from previous contests, with countries with favourable voting histories put into the same pot. On 25 January 2012, a special allocation draw was held which placed each country into one of the two semi-finals, as well as which half of the show they would perform in. Cyprus was placed into the first semi-final, to be held on 22 May 2012, and was scheduled to perform in the second half of the show. The running order for the semi-finals was decided through another draw on 20 March 2012 and Cyprus was set to perform in position 12, following the entry from San Marino and before the entry from Denmark.

The two semi-finals and the final were broadcast in Cyprus on RIK 1, RIK SAT, RIK HD and RIK Triton with commentary by Melina Karageorgiou. The Cypriot spokesperson, who announced the Cypriot votes during the final, was Loukas Hamatsos.

=== Semi-final ===
Ivi Adamou took part in technical rehearsals on 14 and 17 May, followed by dress rehearsals on 21 and 22 May. This included the jury show on 21 May where the professional juries of each country watched and voted on the competing entries.

The Cypriot performance featured Ivi Adamou wearing a silver top, designed by Cypriot fashion designer Fani Xenofontos, joined by four backing dancers wearing short beige dresses with two of them also performing backing vocals. Adamou started the song by standing on a table constructed of antique books, and was later carried head high by the backing performers with a wind machine being used towards the conclusion of the song. The LED screens displayed classical Greek porcelain patterns. The artistic director of the performance was Apollon Papatheoharis, while the choreographer was Challi Jennings. The backing performers that joined Ivi Adamou on stage were Olga Piliaki, Tatiana Dimitriadou, Victoria Taylor and Wiveca Hartmann Knudsen, while the co-composer of "La La Love" Björn Djupström was featured as an additional backing vocalist for the performance.

At the end of the show, Cyprus was announced as having finished in the top 10 and subsequently qualifying for the grand final. It was later revealed that Cyprus placed seventh in the semi-final, receiving a total of 91 points.

=== Final ===
Shortly after the first semi-final, a winners' press conference was held for the ten qualifying countries. As part of this press conference, the qualifying artists took part in a draw to determine the running order for the final. This draw was done in the order the countries were announced during the semi-final. Cyprus was drawn to perform in position 8, following the entry from Denmark and before the entry from Sweden.

Ivi Adamou once again took part in dress rehearsals on 25 and 26 May before the final, including the jury final where the professional juries cast their final votes before the live show. Ivi Adamou performed a repeat of her semi-final performance during the final on 26 May. Cyprus placed sixteenth in the final, scoring 65 points.

=== Voting ===
Voting during the three shows consisted of 50 percent public televoting and 50 percent from a jury deliberation. The jury consisted of five music industry professionals who were citizens of the country they represent. This jury was asked to judge each contestant based on: vocal capacity; the stage performance; the song's composition and originality; and the overall impression by the act. In addition, no member of a national jury could be related in any way to any of the competing acts in such a way that they cannot vote impartially and independently.

Following the release of the full split voting by the EBU after the conclusion of the competition, it was revealed that Cyprus had placed fifteenth with the public televote and twentieth with the jury vote in the final. In the public vote, Cyprus scored 63 points, while with the jury vote, Cyprus scored 85 points. In the first semi-final, Cyprus placed sixth with the public televote with 99 points and fourth with the jury vote, scoring 90 points.

Below is a breakdown of points awarded to Cyprus and awarded by Cyprus in the first semi-final and grand final of the contest. The nation awarded its 12 points to Greece in the semi-final and the final of the contest.

==== Points awarded to Cyprus ====
Points awarded to Cyprus (Semi-final 1)
Score	Country
12 points	Greece; Iceland
10 points	Israel
8 points	Spain
7 points	Italy; Romania; Russia
6 points	Albania; Montenegro
5 points	Ireland
4 points	
3 points	Belgium; Latvia; Moldova
2 points	
1 point	Azerbaijan; Finland

Points awarded to Cyprus (Final)
Score	Country
12 points	Greece; Sweden
10 points	
8 points	Iceland; Serbia
7 points	
6 points	Albania
5 points	Italy; Spain
4 points	
3 points	Israel
2 points	Azerbaijan; Romania; Russia
1 point	

==== Points awarded by Cyprus ====
Points awarded by Cyprus (Semi-final 1)
Score	Country
12 points	Greece
10 points	Albania
8 points	Iceland
7 points	Russia
6 points	Romania
5 points	Hungary
4 points	Denmark
3 points	Moldova
2 points	Switzerland
1 point	Israel

Points awarded by Cyprus (Final)
Score	Country
12 points	Greece
10 points	Sweden
8 points	Azerbaijan
7 points	Serbia
6 points	Spain
5 points	Russia
4 points	Albania
3 points	Romania
2 points	Italy
1 point	Iceland
