= Alex Davia =

Moldovan music producer

- Born: Alexandru Brașoveanu; 12 September 1987 (age 38); Chișinău, Moldavian SSR, Soviet Union (now Moldova)
- Genres: Pop
- Occupations: Composer; musical producer
- Years active: 2005–present
- Label: Davia Music

Alexandru Brașoveanu (born 12 September 1987; Russian: Александр Брашовян or Брашовяну), better known as Alex Davia, is a Moldovan composer and music producer.

== Biography ==
Alexandru Brașoveanu was born on 12 September 1987 in Chișinău, in the Moldavian SSR, in the Soviet Union (now in Moldova). He graduated from the Ciprian Porumbescu Republican Music Lyceum, majoring in piano musicology and composition, and later, the Academy of Music, Theatre and Fine Arts (AMTAP).

In 2008, Davia was a music producer for the Moldovan version of the show "Фабрика звёзд".

In 2009 and 2010, he produced tracks for Moldova on the show "Eurovision".

In 2012, Davia's song "Lăutar" was sung during Moldova's participation at "Eurovision".

In 2014, Davia moved to Russia, currently living and working in Moscow.

Since 2014, he started working not only as a composer, but also as a sound producer. He wrote music for songs by artists like Sati Kazanova ("До рассвета", "Счастье есть!"), Egor Kreed ("Весёлая песня", "Mr. & Mrs. Smith", "Coco L'Eau", "Голос", "Слеза", "Сердцеедка", "Мне все Монро", "Дело нескольких минут", "Девочка с картинки", "Часики", "Грехи", "Время не пришло", "Голубые глаза", "Крутой", "#Этомоё", "Цвет настроения чёрный", "We Gotta Get Love", "3-е сентября"), Назима ("Я твоя", "Тысячи историй") and many others.
