= Logi =

Logi may refer to:

== People ==
- Logi Bergmann Eiðsson (born 1966), Icelandic television host, news anchor and reporter
- Logi Geirsson (born 1982), Icelandic handball player
- Logi Gunnarsson (born 1981), Icelandic basketball player
- Logi Jes Kristjánsson (born 1972), Icelandic swimmer
- Logi Már Einarsson (born 1964), Icelandic politician and architect
- Logi Pedro (born 1992), Icelandic-Angolan musician and record producer
- Logi Ólafsson (born 1954), Icelandic football coach and player

== Companies ==
- Logitech
- Logi Analytics
- Logi (TV channel), an Israeli television channel

== Other ==
- Logi (mythology), Norse deity of fire
- Logi Universe
