= Moldova in the Eurovision Song Contest 2012 =

- Eurovision Song Contest 2012
- Participating broadcaster: TeleRadio-Moldova (TRM)
- Country: Moldova
- Selection process: O melodie pentru Europa 2012
- Selection date: 11 March 2012

Competing entry
- Song: "Lăutar"
- Artist: Pasha Parfeny
- Songwriters: Pasha Parfeni; Alexandru Brașoveanu

Placement
- Semi-final result: Qualified (5th, 100 points)
- Final result: 11th, 81 points

Participation chronology

Moldova was represented at the Eurovision Song Contest 2012 with the song "Lăutar" written by Pasha Parfeny and Alexandru Brașoveanu. The song was performed by Pasha Parfeny. The Moldovan broadcaster TeleRadio-Moldova (TRM) organised the national final O melodie pentru Europa 2012 in order to select the Moldovan entry for the 2012 contest in Baku, Azerbaijan. 85 entries competed to represent Moldova in Baku, with 21 being shortlisted to participate in the televised national final which took place on 11 March 2012 after auditioning in front of a jury panel. "Lăutar" performed by Pasha Parfeny emerged as the winner after gaining the most points following the combination of votes from a jury panel and a public televote.

Moldova was drawn to compete in the first semi-final of the Eurovision Song Contest which took place on 22 May 2012. Performing during the show in position 17, "Lăutar" was announced among the top 10 entries of the first semi-final and therefore qualified to compete in the final on 26 May. It was later revealed that Moldova placed fifth out of the 18 participating countries in the semi-final with 100 points. In the final, Moldova was the closing performance of the show in position 26, placing eleventh out of the 26 participating countries with 81 points.

== Background ==
Prior to the 2012 Contest, Moldova had participated in the Eurovision Song Contest seven times since its first entry in 2005. The nation's best placing in the contest was sixth, which it achieved in 2005 with the song "Boonika bate doba" performed by Zdob și Zdub. Other than their debut entry, to this point, Moldova's only other top ten placing at the contest was achieved in 2007 where "Fight" performed by Natalia Barbu placed tenth. In the 2011 contest, "So Lucky" performed by Zdob și Zdub qualified Moldova to compete in the final and placed twelfth.

The Moldovan national broadcaster, TeleRadio-Moldova (TRM), broadcast the event within Moldova and organised the selection process for the nation's entry. TRM confirmed their intentions to participate at the 2012 Eurovision Song Contest on 28 December 2011. Moldova has selected their entry via a national selection show since 2008, a procedure that was continued for their 2013 participation.

== Before Eurovision ==
=== O melodie pentru Europa 2012 ===
O melodie pentru Europa 2012 was the national final format developed by TRM in order to select Moldova's entry for the Eurovision Song Contest 2012. The event took place at the TRM Studio 2 in Chișinău, hosted by Marcel Spataru, Evelina Vârlan and Dorina Gherganov, and included a final to be held on 11 March 2012. The show was broadcast on Moldova 1, TV Moldova Internațional and Radio Moldova as well as online via the broadcaster's official website trm.md and at the official Eurovision Song Contest website eurovision.tv. The national final was watched by 800,000 viewers in Moldova.

==== Competing entries ====
Artists and composers had the opportunity to submit their entries between 28 December 2011 and 16 January 2012. Artists were required to be of Moldovan nationality and could submit more than one song, while an international act was able to compete only if they were part of a duo or group with a maximum of two international members. Songwriters could hold any nationality. At the conclusion of the submission deadline, 85 valid entries were received by the broadcaster. A jury consisting of Olga Ciolacu (singer), Igor Dînga (producer and composer), Vali Boghean (singer-songwriter), Tatiana Cerga (singer), Andrei Sava (composer), Victoria Tcacenco (professor at the Music, Theatre and Fine Arts Academy) and Dana Argint (Orange Moldova representative) selected 60 out of the 85 received entries to proceed to the audition round.

The live audition round took place on 29 January 2012 at TRM Studio 2 in Chișinău where the jury panel 20 finalists were selected to advance. Entries were assessed on criteria such as vocals and manner of the performance and the originality of the song. "De departe" performed by Alexei Leahu and Georgeta Voinovan was withdrawn from the competition and therefore did not attend the auditions. Alisa Gangan also did not attend the auditions and therefore her song "Fly With Me" was disqualified. An online wildcard vote on trm.md among 33 entries not selected from the audition round ran between 1 and 12 February 2012 to select an additional finalist, and the winner, "Live On Forever" performed by Mariana Mihăilă, was announced on 20 February 2012.

Among the finalists was 2008 Moldovan Eurovision entrant Geta Burlacu. On 20 February 2012, "Turn On the Light" performed by 2009 Moldovan Eurovision entrant Nelly Ciobanu was withdrawn from the competition and replaced with the song "Live the Show" performed by Akord, which came second in the wildcard vote.

Artist	Song	Songwriter(s)
Adrian Ursu	"Be Yourself"	Adrian Ursu, Vica Demici
Akord	"Live the Show"	Igor Stribițchi, Vica Demici
Alexandru Manciu	"If You Leave"	Alexandru Manciu, Mihai Teodor
Anna Gulko	"Ballad of Love"	Anna Gulko
Cristina Croitoru	"Fight for Love"	Doina Sclifos
Dara	"Open Your Eyes"	Eugen Doibani
Doinița Gherman	"Welcome to Moldova"	Vadim Luchin, Timofei Tregubenco, Doinița Gherman
Geta Burlacu	"Never Ever Stop"	Valentin Schirca, Alexandru Aquilar
Inaya	"Lights"	Max Chissaru, Mihai Teodor
Irina Tarasiuc and MC Gootsa	"Save a Little Sunshine"	Ralph Siegel, John O'Flynn
Ksenya Nikora	"You Better Rush"	Serghei Bilcenco, Roman Lupu
Leria	"A Ray of Sun"	Michalis Antoniou, Alexandru Bușă
M Studio	"Open Your Eyes"	M Studio
Mariana Mihăilă	"Live On Forever"	Gorgi, Aidan O'Connor
MC Mike and Human Place	"The Mole Girl"	Ilie Gorincioi (Tadevs)
Nelly Ciobanu	"Turn On the Light"	Eugene Oleinik, Kjell Dahlander
Nicoleta Gavriliță	"Crazy Little Thing"	Nicoleta Gavriliță, Serghei Bilcenco, Liuba Perciun
Paralela 47	"Arde"	Paralela 47, Alecu Mătrăgună
Pasha Parfeny	"Lăutar"	Pavel Parfeny, Alexandru Brașoveanu
Ruslan Țăranu	"Blanche"	Ruslan Țăranu
Transbalkanica	"Balkan Riders"	Marcel Ștefăneț, Ghenadie Cubasov
Univox	"Moody Numbers"	Nicolai Andrus, Renata Platon

==== Final ====
The final took place on 11 March 2012. Twenty-one songs competed and the winner was selected based on the combination of a public televote and the votes of an expert jury. The jury that voted in the final included Nicu Țărnă (singer), Olga Ciolacu (singer), Vali Boghean (singer-songwriter), Tatiana Cerga (singer), Igor Dînga (producer and composer), Victoria Tcacenco (professor at the Music, Theatre and Fine Arts Academy), Andrei Sava (composer), Angela Brașoveanu (journalist), Igor Cobileanschi (director), Ludmila Climoc (Orange Moldova representative) and Anatol Chiriac (composer). In addition to the performances of the competing entries, 2012 Swiss Eurovision entrant Sinplus and 2012 Ukrainian Eurovision entrant Gaitana performed as a guest. "Lăutar" performed by Pasha Parfeny was selected as the winner.

Final – 11 March 2012
R/O	Artist	Song	Jury		Televote		Total	Place
R/O	Artist	Song	Votes	Points	Percentage	Points	Total	Place
1	Ruslan Țăranu	"Blanche"	10	0	0.48%	0	0	14
2	Irina Tarasiuc and MC Gootsa	"Save a Little Sunshine"	4	0	6.82%	8	8	6
3	Pasha Parfeny	"Lăutar"	119	12	20.44%	10	22	1
4	Alexandru Manciu	"If You Leave"	23	1	5.02%	4	5	10
5	Paralela 47	"Arde"	7	0	1.43%	0	0	15
6	Ksenya Nikora	"You Better Rush"	9	0	2.02%	0	0	16
7	Leria	"A Ray of Sun"	7	0	0.88%	0	0	17
8	Cristina Croitoru	"Fight for Love"	43	4	23.68%	12	16	2
9	Mariana Mihăilă	"Live On Forever"	1	0	3.93%	2	2	12
10	MC Mike and Human Place	"The Mole Girl"	11	0	1.29%	0	0	18
11	Nicoleta Gavriliță	"Crazy Little Thing"	53	6	1.86%	0	6	8
12	Geta Burlacu	"Never Ever Stop"	57	7	2.57%	0	7	7
13	Adrian Ursu	"Be Yourself"	37	2	6.62%	7	9	5
14	Doinița Gherman	"Welcome to Moldova"	12	0	2.90%	1	1	13
15	M Studio	"Open Your Eyes"	10	0	1.54%	0	0	19
16	Anna Gulko	"Ballad of Love"	14	0	0.64%	0	0	20
17	Transbalkanica	"Balkan Riders"	63	8	6.03%	6	14	4
18	Dara	"Open Your Eyes"	67	10	5.89%	5	15	3
19	Univox	"Moody Numbers"	47	5	0.61%	0	5	11
20	Akord	"Live the Show"	43	3	4.12%	3	6	9
21	Inaya	"Lights"	1	0	1.23%	0	0	21

Detailed Jury Votes
R/O	Song	N. Țărnă	O. Ciolacu	V. Boghean	T. Cerga	I. Dînga	V. Tcacenco	A. Sava	A. Brașoveanu	I. Cobileanschi	L. Climoc	A. Chiriac	Total
1	"Blanche"					4		4				2	10
2	"Save a Little Sunshine"	1					3						4
3	"Lăutar"	12	12	12	12	10	8	12	7	10	12	12	119
4	"If You Leave"	7	6		3			6		1			23
5	"Arde"				2	3			2				7
6	"You Better Rush"			7		1		1					9
7	"A Ray of Sun"		3				1				3		7
8	"Fight for Love"	2		8	6		2	8	1		8	8	43
9	"Live On Forever"											1	1
10	"The Mole Girl"						4		3		4		11
11	"Crazy Little Thing"	10	2	6			7		10	8		10	53
12	"Never Ever Stop"	5	7	3		7	6		12	5	6	6	57
13	"Be Yourself"	3	4	2	7			7			7	7	37
14	"Welcome to Moldova"		1			8						3	12
15	"Open Your Eyes"							5		3	2		10
16	"Ballad of Love"					5	5			4			14
17	"Balkan Riders"	4	8	10	5	2	12	10	6	2		4	63
18	"Open Your Eyes"	6	5	4	10	12		3	5	12	10		67
19	"Moody Numbers"			5	4	6	10	2	8	7	5		47
20	"Live the Show"	8	10	1	8				4	6	1	5	43
21	"Lights"				1								1

=== Promotion ===
Pasha Parfeny made several appearances across Europe to specifically promote "Lăutar" as the Moldovan Eurovision entry. On 21 April, Pasha Parfeny performed during the Eurovision in Concert event which was held at the Melkweg venue in Amsterdam, Netherlands and hosted by Ruth Jacott and Cornald Maas. On 29 April, Parfeny performed during the Primavara Romaneasca event which was held at the ARTHIS venue in Brussels, Belgium.

== At Eurovision ==
According to Eurovision rules, all nations with the exceptions of the host country and the "Big Five" (France, Germany, Italy, Spain and the United Kingdom) are required to qualify from one of two semi-finals in order to compete for the final; the top ten countries from each semi-final progress to the final. The European Broadcasting Union (EBU) split up the competing countries into six different pots based on voting patterns from previous contests, with countries with favourable voting histories put into the same pot. On 25 January 2012, a special allocation draw was held which placed each country into one of the two semi-finals, as well as which half of the show they would perform in. Moldova was placed into the first semi-final, to be held on 22 May 2012, and was scheduled to perform in the second half of the show. The running order for the semi-finals was decided through another draw on 20 March 2012 and Moldova was set to perform in position 17, following the entry from Austria and before the entry from Ireland.

The two semi-finals and the final were televised in Moldova on Moldova 1 as well as broadcast via radio on Radio Moldova. All broadcasts featured commentary by Marcel Spătari. The Moldovan spokesperson, who announced the Moldovan votes during the final, was Olivia Furtună.

=== Semi-final ===
Pasha Parfeny took part in technical rehearsals on 14 and 18 May, followed by dress rehearsals on 21 and 22 May. This included the jury show on 21 May where the professional juries of each country watched and voted on the competing entries.

The Moldovan performance featured Pasha Parfeny performing a choreographed routine on stage with five dancers, dressed in short colourful dresses and with two of them also performing backing vocals. The stage featured predominantly red lighting and LED screen projections of red lips and hearts as well as chequerboard patterns and a white silhouette of a dancer. The dancers that joined Parfeny on stage are Aliona Moon, Tatiana Heghea, Julia Gakhova, Ksyusha Vertelnikova and Lera Kirichenko. The latter three are members of the Ukrainian ballet group "Lyubovniki", while Aliona Moon would go on to represent Moldova in the Eurovision Song Contest 2013.

At the end of the show, Moldova was announced as having finished in the top ten and subsequently qualifying for the grand final. It was later revealed that Moldova placed fifth in the semi-final, receiving a total of 100 points.

=== Final ===
Shortly after the first semi-final, a winners' press conference was held for the ten qualifying countries. As part of this press conference, the qualifying artists took part in a draw to determine the running order for the final. This draw was done in the order the countries were announced during the semi-final. Moldova was drawn to perform last in position 26, following the entry from Ukraine.

Pasha Parfeny once again took part in dress rehearsals on 25 and 26 May before the final, including the jury final where the professional juries cast their final votes before the live show. Parfeny performed a repeat of his semi-final performance during the final on 26 May. Moldova placed eleventh in the final, scoring 81 points.

=== Voting ===
Voting during the three shows consisted of 50 percent public televoting and 50 percent from a jury deliberation. The jury consisted of five music industry professionals who were citizens of the country they represent. This jury was asked to judge each contestant based on: vocal capacity; the stage performance; the song's composition and originality; and the overall impression by the act. In addition, no member of a national jury could be related in any way to any of the competing acts in such a way that they cannot vote impartially and independently.

Following the release of the full split voting by the EBU after the conclusion of the competition, it was revealed that Moldova had placed thirteenth with the public televote and ninth with the jury vote in the final. In the public vote, Moldova scored 75 points, while with the jury vote, Moldova scored 104 points. In the first semi-final, Moldova placed seventh with the public televote with 85 points and second with the jury vote, scoring 107 points.

Below is a breakdown of points awarded to Moldova and awarded by Moldova in the first semi-final and grand final of the contest. The nation awarded its 12 points to Romania in the semi-final and the final of the contest.

==== Points awarded to Moldova ====
Points awarded to Moldova (Semi-final 1)
Score	Country
12 points	Russia
10 points	Romania; Spain
8 points	
7 points	Switzerland
6 points	Austria; Azerbaijan; Denmark; Finland; Greece; Israel
5 points	San Marino
4 points	Albania; Italy
3 points	Cyprus; Montenegro
2 points	Hungary; Ireland; Latvia
1 point	

Points awarded to Moldova (Final)
Score	Country
12 points	Romania
10 points	
8 points	San Marino; Ukraine
7 points	Denmark; Russia; Spain
6 points	Portugal
5 points	Belarus; Israel
4 points	Italy
3 points	Montenegro
2 points	Greece; Hungary; Switzerland
1 point	Austria; Croatia; Slovenia

==== Points awarded by Moldova ====
Points awarded by Moldova (Semi-final 1)
Score	Country
12 points	Romania
10 points	Greece
8 points	Switzerland
7 points	San Marino
6 points	Russia
5 points	Hungary
4 points	Latvia
3 points	Cyprus
2 points	Iceland
1 point	Albania

Points awarded by Moldova (Final)
Score	Country
12 points	Romania
10 points	Azerbaijan
8 points	Ukraine
7 points	Sweden
6 points	Russia
5 points	Italy
4 points	Greece
3 points	Serbia
2 points	Estonia
1 point	Hungary
