= Switzerland in the Eurovision Song Contest 2012 =

- Eurovision Song Contest 2012
- Participating broadcaster: Swiss Broadcasting Corporation (SRG SSR)
- Country: Switzerland
- Selection process: Die grosse Entscheidungs Show 2012
- Selection date: 10 December 2011

Competing entry
- Song: "Unbreakable"
- Artist: Sinplus
- Songwriters: Gabriel Broggini; Ivan Broggini

Placement
- Semi-final result: Failed to qualify (11th)

Participation chronology

Switzerland was represented at the Eurovision Song Contest 2012 with the song "Unbreakable" written by Gabriel Broggini and Ivan Broggini. The song was performed by the duo Sinplus. The Swiss entry for the 2012 contest in Baku, Azerbaijan was selected through the national final Die grosse Entscheidungs Show 2012, organised by the Swiss German speaking broadcaster Schweizer Fernsehen (SF) and radio station DRS 3 in collaboration with the other broadcasters part of the Swiss Broadcasting Corporation (SRG SSR). SF, DRS 3, the Swiss-French broadcaster Radio Télévision Suisse (RTS) and the Swiss-Italian broadcaster Radiotelevisione svizzera (RSI) each conducted varying selections and a total of fourteen entries were selected to advance to the televised national final—six artists and songs from the SF selection, three from the DRS 3 selection, three from the RTS selection and two from the RSI selection. The fourteen finalists performed during the national final on 10 December 2011 where public voting ultimately selected "Unbreakable" performed by Sinplus as the winner.

Switzerland was drawn to compete in the first semi-final of the Eurovision Song Contest which took place on 22 May 2012. Performing during the show in position 7, "Unbreakable" was not announced among the top 10 entries of the first semi-final and therefore did not qualify to compete in the final. It was later revealed that Switzerland placed eleventh out of the 18 participating countries in the semi-final with 45 points.

== Background ==
Prior to the 2012 contest, Switzerland had participated in the Eurovision Song Contest fifty-two times since its first entry in 1956. Switzerland is noted for having won the first edition of the Eurovision Song Contest with the song "Refrain" performed by Lys Assia. Their second and, to this point, most recent victory was achieved in 1988 when Canadian singer Céline Dion won the contest with the song "Ne partez pas sans moi". Following the introduction of semi-finals for the 2004, Switzerland had managed to participate in the final three times up to this point. In 2005, the internal selection of Estonian girl band Vanilla Ninja, performing the song "Cool Vibes", qualified Switzerland to the final where they placed 8th. Due to their successful result in 2005, Switzerland was pre-qualified to compete directly in the final in 2006. Between 2007 and 2010, the nation failed to qualify to the final after a string of internal selections. After opting to organize a national final in 2011, Switzerland has managed to qualify to the final but placed last with the song "In Love for a While" performed by Anna Rossinelli.

The Swiss national broadcaster, Swiss Broadcasting Corporation (SRG SSR), broadcasts the event within Switzerland and organises the selection process for the nation's entry. SRG SSR confirmed their intentions to participate at the 2012 Eurovision Song Contest on 15 May 2011. Along with their participation confirmation, the broadcaster also announced that the Swiss entry for the 2012 contest would be selected through a national final. Switzerland has selected their entry for the Eurovision Song Contest through both national finals and internal selections in the past. Between 2005 and 2010, the Swiss entry was internally selected for the competition. In 2011, the broadcaster has opted to organize a national final in order to select their entry.

== Before Eurovision ==
=== Die grosse Entscheidungs Show 2012 ===
Die grosse Entscheidungs Show 2012 was the second edition of the Swiss national final format that selected Switzerland's entry for the Eurovision Song Contest 2012. The national final was a collaboration between three broadcasters in Switzerland: the Swiss-German broadcaster Schweizer Fernsehen (SF) and radio station DRS 3, the radio station from SF DRS 3, the Swiss-French broadcaster Radio Télévision Suisse (RTS) and the Swiss-Italian broadcaster Radiotelevisione svizzera (RSI). The show took place on 10 December 2011 at the Bodensee Arena in Kreuzlingen, hosted by Sven Epiney and was televised on SRF 1, RSI La 2 with Italian commentary by Clarissa Tami and Paolo Meneguzzi, and RTS Deux with French commentary by Nicolas Tanner and Jean-Marc Richard. The competition was also broadcast via radio on DRS 3 and streamed online at SF's official website sf.tv.

==== Selection process ====
The selection process took place in two stages before the finalists for the live show and ultimately the winner are selected. The first stage of the competition included SF, DRS 3, RTS and RSI each conducting varying selections in order to determine the candidates they submitted for the second stage of the competition. SF submitted six candidates, DRS 3 and RTS each submitted three candidates and RSI submitted two candidates. The fourteen artists and songs proceed to the second stage, the televised national final, where the winning artist and song was selected to represent Switzerland in Baku.

- The SF selection involved an online internet voting platform where interested artists could submit their songs and have them listed for public listening. The platform accepted entries between 1 September 2011 and 30 September 2011. 221 entries were submitted following the submission deadline, including entries from Swiss 1956 Eurovision winner as well as 1957 and 1958 entrant Lys Assia and 2007 Danish entrant DQ. Internet users had between 16 and 30 October 2011 to vote for their favourite entries and their votes were combined with the votes from an expert jury. On 11 November 2011, the top six entries and SF candidates for the national final were announced.
- The DRS 3 selection involved an internal selection from the entries submitted for the SF selection. The three DRS 3 candidates for the national final were announced on 13 October 2011. "Lost" performed by Sara McLoud was originally selected as one of the candidates, however the song was later disqualified as it was published in an acoustic version prior to the 1 September 2011 deadline, making it ineligible for the Eurovision Song Contest. "Black Symphony" performed by Atomic Angels was selected as the replacement entry.
- The RTS selection involved interested artists submitting their entries to the broadcaster between 1 September 2011 and 30 September 2011. At the close of the deadline, 27 entries were received. The entries were evaluated from 5 to 25 October 2011 by the votes from internet users, and the top ten entries were again evaluated from 25 October to 3 November 2011 by internet users (50%) and the votes of a jury panel that consisted of Catherine Colombara, Emile Felber, Jean-Marc Richard and Yann Zitouni (50%). The top three entries and RTS candidates for the national final were announced on 4 November 2011.
- RSI opened a submission period on 22 August 2011 for interested artists and composers to submit their entries. On 10 October 2011, a jury panel consisting of Mauro Ravarelli, Gianluca Verga and Nicola Albertoni evaluated the 22 entry submissions received and selected five songs for a regional final. An additional two entries were selected by internet voting held between 10 and 18 October 2011 among the remaining 17 entries to proceed to the selection. The regional final, hosted by Clarissa Tami and Fabrizio Casati, took place on 8 November 2011 from the Temus Music Bar in Agno and was broadcast on RSI La 2 as well as via radio on RSI Rete Tre. Public televoting selected two entries as the RSI candidates for the national final.

RTS selection – 4 November 2011
Artist	Song	Online Vote		Result
Artist	Song	Votes	Rank	Result
ADN 2.0	"Dark Light"	992	8	—N/a
Katherine St-Laurent	"Wrong to Let You Go"	3,849	3	Advanced
Marie-Élaine and Étienne	"Demande-moi"	4,527	2	—N/a
Romanz	"For You (I'll Build Rome in One Day)"	5,516	1	—N/a
Sinplus	"Unbreakable"	1,940	6	—N/a
Sosofluo	"Quand je ferme les yeux"	2,545	5	Advanced
The Kompozit	"Le faim du monde"	2,710	4	—N/a
Valentine de Rham	"It Doesn't Have to Rain Today"	716	10	—N/a
Vartoch' et les Aliens	"Boum sur saturne"	1,246	7	—N/a
Ze Flying Zézettes Orchestra	"L'autre"	758	9	Advanced

RSI selection – 8 November 2011
R/O	Artist	Song	Result
1	Vittoria Hyde	"It's Your Love"	—N/a
2	Gianluca Solci	"Giro intorno"	—N/a
3	Rossella	"Here I Am"	—N/a
4	Laetitia	"The Big Picture"	—N/a
5	Sinplus	"Unbreakable"	Advanced
6	Chiara Dubey	"Anima nuova"	Advanced
7	Scilla Hess	"Masquerade"	—N/a

Competing entries
Artist	Song	Songwriter(s)	Channel
Atomic Angels	"Black Symphony"	Ben Mühlethaler, Tom Jensen, Dawn Joseph, Atomic Angels	DRS 3
Chiara Dubey	"Anima nuova"	Filippo Leoni, Chiara Dubey	RSI
Emel	"She"	Christian Riesen, Emel Aykanat, Kareem Roustom, Rolf Stauffacher	SF
Guillermo Sorya	"Baby Baby Baby"	Guillermo Sorya	DRS 3
I Quattro	"Fragile"	Evelyn Fischer	SF
Ivo	"Peace & Freedom"	Ivo Sidler, Kevin Salem	SF
Katherine St-Laurent	"Wrong to Let You Go"	Katherine St-Laurent, Benoît Babin	RTS
Lys Assia	"C'était ma vie"	Jean-Paul Cara, Ralph Siegel	SF
Macy	"Shining"	Cyril Mauderli, David Hofmann, Frank Niklaus, Jim Bows, Thomas Maritz	SF
Patric Scott feat. Fabienne Louves	"Real Love"	Patric Scott, Martin de Vries	DRS 3
Raphael Jeger	"The Song in My Head"	Raphael Jeger	SF
Sinplus	"Unbreakable"	Gabriel Broggini, Ivan Broggini	RSI
Sosofluo	"Quand je ferme les yeux"	Sophie Rochat	RTS
Ze Flying Zézettes Orchestra	"L'autre"	Sébastien Wolfensberger	RTS

==== Final ====
The final took place on 10 December 2011. Two-minute abridged versions of the fourteen candidate songs in contention to represent Switzerland were performed and televoting solely selected "Unbreakable" performed by Sinplus as the winner. An expert panel consisting of Nik Hartmann (presenter), Carlos Leal (actor and rapper) and Stämpf (musician) also provided commentary and feedback to the entries. In addition to the performances from the competing entries, Swiss Eurovision Song Contest 2011 entrant Anna Rossinelli performed her song "Joker" as the interval act.

Final – 10 December 2011
R/O	Artist	Song	Televote	Place
1	Patric Scott feat. Fabienne Louves	"Real Love"	9.81%	6
2	Emel	"She"	1.30%	11
3	Chiara Dubey	"Anima nuova"	13.82%	3
4	Guillermo Sorya	"Baby Baby Baby"	1.19%	12
5	Macy	"Shining"	3.49%	9
6	Sosofluo	"Quand je ferme les yeux"	1.08%	14
7	Atomic Angels	"Black Symphony"	2.36%	10
8	Ivo	"Peace & Freedom"	16.02%	2
9	Ze Flying Zézettes Orchestra	"L'autre"	1.17%	13
10	Raphael Jeger	"The Song in My Head"	5.96%	7
11	I Quattro	"Fragile"	10.56%	4
12	Sinplus	"Unbreakable"	17.87%	1
13	Lys Assia	"C'était ma vie"	5.46%	8
14	Katherine St-Laurent	"Wrong to Let You Go"	9.91%	5

=== Promotion ===
Sinplus made several appearances across Europe to specifically promote "Unbreakable" as the Swiss Eurovision entry. The band performed "Unbreakable" during the semi-final of the Maltese Eurovision national final on 3 February, the final of the Belarusian Eurovision national final Eurofest 2012 on 14 February, the Ukrainian Eurovision national final on 18 February (a pre-recorded performance filmed on 17 February was aired during the show), and the final of the Latvian Eurovision national final Eirodziesma 2012 on 18 February. On 21 April, Sinplus performed during the Eurovision in Concert event which was held at the Melkweg venue in Amsterdam, Netherlands and hosted by Ruth Jacott and Cornald Maas.

== At Eurovision ==
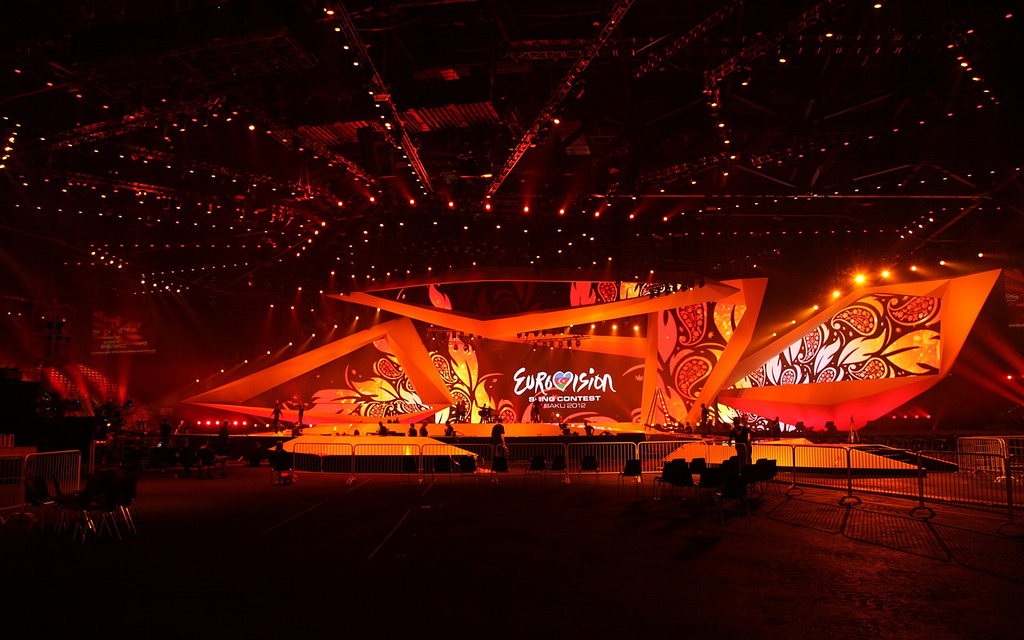
The Eurovision Song Contest 2012 took place at the Baku Crystal Hall in Baku, Azerbaijan

According to Eurovision rules, all nations with the exceptions of the host country and the "Big Five" (France, Germany, Italy, Spain and the United Kingdom) are required to qualify from one of two semi-finals in order to compete for the final; the top ten countries from each semi-final progress to the final. The European Broadcasting Union (EBU) split up the competing countries into six different pots based on voting patterns from previous contests, with countries with favourable voting histories put into the same pot. On 25 January 2012, a special allocation draw was held which placed each country into one of the two semi-finals, as well as which half of the show they would perform in. Switzerland was placed into the first semi-final, to be held on 22 May 2012, and was scheduled to perform in the first half of the show. The running order for the semi-finals was decided through another draw on 20 March 2012 and Switzerland was set to perform in position 7, following the entry from Romania and before the entry from Belgium.

In Switzerland, three broadcasters that form SRG SSR aired the contest. Sven Epiney provided German commentary for the first semi-final and the final airing on SRF zwei. Jean-Marc Richard and Nicolas Tanner provided French commentary for the first semi-final and the final on RTS Deux. Clarissa Tami and 2008 Swiss Eurovision Song Contest entrant Paolo Meneguzzi provided Italian commentary for the first semi-final on RSI La 2 and the final on RSI La 1. The Swiss spokesperson, who announced the Swiss votes during the final, was Sara Hildebrand.

=== Semi-final ===
Sinplus took part in technical rehearsals on 13 and 17 May, followed by dress rehearsals on 21 and 22 May. This included the jury show on 21 May where the professional juries of each country watched and voted on the competing entries.

The Swiss performance featured the members of Sinplus performing on stage; Gabriel Broggini wore black leather trousers and jacket while Ivan Broggini wore a green leather jacket. The band also performed together with a male drummer and female electric guitarist, with the male performers also wearing a t-shirt with the word "Unbreakable" and the female performer in a black dress. The LED screens displayed a tunnel effect with flashing blue, red, green and white lines, and the performance featured pyrotechnic flame effects. The drummer and electric guitarist that respectively joined Sinplus were Roberto Bianchetti and Lisa Panigada.

At the end of the show, Switzerland was not announced among the top 10 entries in the first semi-final and therefore failed to qualify to compete in the final. It was later revealed that Switzerland placed eleventh in the semi-final, receiving a total of 45 points.

=== Voting ===
Voting during the three shows consisted of 50 percent public televoting and 50 percent from a jury deliberation. The jury consisted of five music industry professionals who were citizens of the country they represent. This jury was asked to judge each contestant based on: vocal capacity; the stage performance; the song's composition and originality; and the overall impression by the act. In addition, no member of a national jury could be related in any way to any of the competing acts in such a way that they cannot vote impartially and independently.

Following the release of the full split voting by the EBU after the conclusion of the competition, it was revealed that Switzerland had placed tenth with the public televote and thirteenth with the jury vote in the first semi-final. In the public vote, Switzerland scored 49 points, while with the jury vote, Switzerland scored 45 points.

Below is a breakdown of points awarded to Switzerland and awarded by Switzerland in the first semi-final and grand final of the contest. The nation awarded its 12 points to Albania in the semi-final and to Albania in the final of the contest.

==== Points awarded to Switzerland ====
Points awarded to Switzerland (Semi-final 1)
Score	Country
12 points	
10 points	
8 points	Hungary; Italy; Moldova
7 points	Latvia
6 points	
5 points	
4 points	
3 points	Albania; Austria
2 points	Cyprus; Iceland; Romania
1 point	Israel; San Marino

==== Points awarded by Switzerland ====
Points awarded by Switzerland (Semi-final 1)
Score	Country
12 points	Albania
10 points	Denmark
8 points	Russia
7 points	Moldova
6 points	Hungary
5 points	Austria
4 points	Iceland
3 points	Greece
2 points	Romania
1 point	Finland

Points awarded by Switzerland (Final)
Score	Country
12 points	Albania
10 points	Serbia
8 points	Spain
7 points	Sweden
6 points	France
5 points	Italy
4 points	Germany
3 points	Turkey
2 points	Moldova
1 point	Bosnia and Herzegovina
