= The Brilliant Things =

- Origin: Dublin, Ireland
- Genres: Synthpop, electronic rock
- Years active: 2008–present
- Labels: Spokes Records
- Members: Marie Junior; Greg French
- Website: thebrilliantthings.com

The Brilliant Things are an Irish synthpop/electronic rock band, based in Dublin and London.

== Career ==
The Brilliant Things is composed of Marie Junior on lead vocals and Greg French as songwriter, guitarist and keyboards player. Both in their twenties, they independently experienced various aspects of the music industry.

Greg French has worked as songwriter/engineer/producer in many top international studios, working with artists such as The Corrs, Van Morrison, Mutt Lange and Brian Eno.

Marie Junior previously embarked on a solo career under the name Sweet T, gaining an Irish Chart's Top 40 placing with her take on The Mekon's "I Love a Millionaire".

The band released their self-titled debut album in Ireland on 7 October 2011. The band's first UK release "Dance" was A listed on BBC Radio 2 and reached number 36 in the UK Airplay charts in January 2012. The band's second release "Pointless" was B listed on BBC Radio 2. The band's follow-up release was "Feels Like Summer" and was A-Listed on BBC Radio 2 for 4 weeks and reached 28 in the UK Charts.

== Discography ==
=== Albums ===
- The Brilliant Things (2011)

=== Singles ===
- "Dance"
- "Pointless" (2012)
- "Feels Like Summer"
