= Dajana Lööf =

Swedish singer, songwriter and television host

- Born: 2 January 1983 (age 43); Yugoslavia
- Citizenship: Yugoslavia (Formerly); Sweden

Dajana Lööf (born 2 January 1983 in Yugoslavia) is a Swedish singer, songwriter and television host. Lööf came into the spotlight in 2003 when she was a contestant and finalist in the talent show Fame Factory, the Swedish version of Fame Academy on TV3. She has also been hosting the nightly game show Nattöppet on TV4 and Lustgården on TV3 along with Tilde Fröling.

Lööf co-wrote the entry Aphrodisiac that represented Greece in the Eurovision Song Contest 2012 performed by singer Eleftheria Eleftheriou.
