= Finland in the Eurovision Song Contest 2012 =

- Eurovision Song Contest 2012
- Participating broadcaster: Yleisradio (Yle)
- Country: Finland
- Selection process: Uuden Musiikin Kilpailu 2012
- Selection date: 25 February 2012

Competing entry
- Song: "När jag blundar"
- Artist: Pernilla Karlsson
- Songwriters: Jonas Karlsson

Placement
- Semi-final result: Failed to qualify (12th)

Participation chronology

Finland was represented at the Eurovision Song Contest 2012 with the song "När jag blundar", written by Jonas Karlsson, and performed by Pernilla Karlsson. The Finnish participating broadcaster, Yleisradio (Yle), organised the national final Uuden Musiikin Kilpailu 2012 in order to select its entry for the contest. 13 entries were selected to compete in the national final, which consisted of four performance shows and a final, taking place in January and February 2012. Six entries ultimately competed in the final on 25 February where votes from the public selected "När jag blundar" performed by Pernilla Karlsson as the winner.

Finland was drawn to compete in the first semi-final of the Eurovision Song Contest which took place on 22 May 2012. Performing during the show in position 9, "När jag blundar" was not announced among the top 10 entries of the first semi-final and therefore did not qualify to compete in the final. It was later revealed that Finland placed twelfth out of the 18 participating countries in the semi-final with 41 points.

== Background ==
Prior to the 2012 contest, Yleisradio (Yle) had participated in the Eurovision Song Contest representing Finland forty-five times since its first entry in 1961. It has won the contest once in 2006 with the song "Hard Rock Hallelujah" performed by Lordi. In 2011, "Da Da Dam" performed by Paradise Oskar managed to qualify Finland to the final and placed twenty-first.

As part of its duties as participating broadcaster, Yle organises the selection of its entry in the Eurovision Song Contest and broadcasts the event in the country. The broadcaster confirmed its intentions to participate at the 2012 contest on 16 May 2011. Yle had selected its entries for the contest through national final competitions that have varied in format over the years. Since 1961, a selection show that was often titled Euroviisukarsinta highlighted that the purpose of the program was to select a song for Eurovision. However, along with its participation confirmation, the broadcaster also announced that its entry for the 2012 contest would be selected through the selection show Uuden Musiikin Kilpailu (UMK), which would focus on showcasing new music with the winning song being selected as the Finnish entry.

== Before Eurovision ==
=== Uuden Musiikin Kilpailu 2012 ===
Uuden Musiikin Kilpailu 2012 was the first edition of Uuden Musiikin Kilpailu (UMK), the music competition that selects Finland's entries for the Eurovision Song Contest. The competition consisted of five shows that commenced with the first of four performance shows on 3 February 2012 and concluded with a final on 25 February 2012. The four shows were hosted by YleX DJs Anne Lainto and Joona Kortesmäki. All shows were broadcast on Yle TV2, Yle HD and online at yle.fi. The final was also broadcast via radio on Yle Radio Suomi.

==== Format ====
The format of the competition consisted of five shows: four performance shows and a final. Six songs competed in each of the first two performance shows and two entries from each show were eliminated. Nine songs consisting of the remaining eight songs and a wildcard selected by a public vote competed in the third performance show and two entries were eliminated to complete the six-song lineup in the final. The results for the first three shows were determined by a five-member judging panel, the results for the fourth show were determined by public voting and judges' voting, while the results in the final were determined exclusively by a public vote. Public voting included the options of telephone and SMS voting.

The judging panel participated in each show by providing feedback to the competing artists and selecting entries to qualify in the competition. The panel consisted of:

- Pauliina Ahokas – Executive Director of Music Export Finland
- Sami Häikiö – Project Manager of Music Export Finland
- Anna Laine – Programmer at Radio Helsinki
- Tomi Saarinen – Head of Music at YleX
- Jorma Hietamäki – Head of Music at Yle Radio Suomi

==== Competing entries ====
A submission period was opened by Yle which lasted between 15 August 2011 and 1 October 2011. At least one of the writers and the lead singer(s) had to hold Finnish citizenship or live in Finland permanently in order for the entry to qualify to compete. A panel of eleven experts appointed by Yle shortlisted 40 entries from the 540 received submissions. Demo versions of the shortlisted entries were released on 2 November 2011 at yle.fi and an online vote took place which was won by "Aamuyön ikuisuus" performed by Jari ja Taika. The judging panel selected twelve entries for the competition and an additional three entries for a wildcard selection. The competing entries were presented during a televised preview programme on 27 January 2012, hosted by Anne Lainto and Joona Kortesmäki, and the public was able to vote via telephone and SMS for the wildcard until 2 February 2012. "Teleport My Heart" performed by The Spyro was selected as the public wildcard and was announced during the second performance show on 10 February 2012.

Wildcard selection – 10 February 2012
Artist	Song	Songwriter(s)	Televote	Place
Jessica Wolff	"Better"	Janne Hyöty, Niklas Rosström, Paul Oxley	18%	2
Martina	"Checkmate"	Hermanni Kovalainen, Aatu Mällinen, Adam Powers, Lene Dissing	7%	3
The Spyro	"Teleport My Heart"	Hape Haavikko, Olli Pitkänen	75%	1

Artist	Song	Songwriter(s)
Aili	"Mun taivas"	Jussi Petäjä
Aura Pineda	"Kunpa vois"	Ape Anttila, Sana Mustonen
Freeman and Uusi Fantasia	"Noitanainen"	Leo Friman, Mikko Viljakainen, Perttu Mäkelä, Veikka Erkola, Anna Maria Rahikainen
Iconcrash	"We Are the Night"	Jaani Peuhu, Rory Winston
Jari ja Taika	"Aamuyön ikuisuus"	Jari Mustajärvi
Kaisa Vala	"Habits of Human Beings"	Kaisa Vala
Kirahvi nimeltä Tuike	"Sinisulkien viimeinen"	Mikko Tirri, Visa Kurki
Leola	"Rytmit rikkoutuu"	Kuisma Eskola
Mica Ikonen	"Antaa mennä"	Lauri Hämäläinen, Mica Ikonen
Pernilla Karlsson	"När jag blundar"	Jonas Karlsson
The Spyro	"Teleport My Heart"	Hape Haavikko, Olli Pitkänen
Stig	"Laululeija"	Matti Mikkola, Perttu Mäkelä, Paula Vesala
Ville Eetvartti	"Lasikaupunki"	Jyri Sariola, Tero Myllyvirta, Joni Pekkarinen

==== Performance shows ====
The four performance shows took place on 3, 10, 17 and 24 February 2012 in Helsinki: the first two shows took place at the M1 Studios, the third show took place at the Club Dom and the fourth show took place at the Helsinki Ice Hall as part of the final rehearsals. The public wildcard, "Teleport My Heart" performed by The Spyro, performed starting from the third show. The judges eliminated two of the competing entries in the first three shows, while one was eliminated by the judges in the fourth show after a public televote between 17 and 24 February 2012 nominated two of the seven remaining entries for elimination. In addition to the performances of the competing entries, Laura Närhi performed as the interval act in the first show.

Show 1 – 3 February 2012
R/O	Artist	Song	Result
1	Mica Ikonen	"Antaa mennä"	Safe
2	Jari ja Taika	"Aamuyön ikuisuus"	—N/a
3	Stig	"Laululeija"	Safe
4	Aili	"Mun taivas"	Safe
5	Kirahvi nimeltä Tuike	"Sinisulkien viimeinen"	—N/a
6	Pernilla Karlsson	"När jag blundar"	Safe

Show 2 – 10 February 2012
R/O	Artist	Song	Result
1	Iconcrash	"We Are the Night"	Safe
2	Aura Pineda	"Kunpa vois"	—N/a
3	Freeman and Uusi Fantasia	"Noitanainen"	Safe
4	Leola	"Rytmit rikkoutuu"	—N/a
5	Ville Eetvartti	"Lasikaupunki"	Safe
6	Kaisa Vala	"Habits of Human Beings"	Safe

Show 3 – 17 February 2012
R/O	Artist	Song	Result
1	Kaisa Vala	"Habits of Human Beings"	Safe
2	Mica Ikonen	"Antaa mennä"	Safe
3	Aili	"Mun taivas"	—N/a
4	Freeman and Uusi Fantasia	"Noitanainen"	Safe
5	Iconcrash	"We Are the Night"	Safe
6	Pernilla Karlsson	"När jag blundar"	Safe
7	Ville Eetvartti	"Lasikaupunki"	Safe
8	Stig	"Laululeija"	Safe
9	The Spyro	"Teleport My Heart"	—N/a

Show 4 (First Round) – 17–24 February 2012
R/O	Artist	Song	Result
1	Mica Ikonen	"Antaa mennä"	Safe
2	Pernilla Karlsson	"När jag blundar"	Safe
3	Ville Eetvartti	"Lasikaupunki"	Safe
4	Kaisa Vala	"Habits of Human Beings"	Bottom two
5	Iconcrash	"We Are the Night"	Safe
6	Freeman and Uusi Fantasia	"Noitanainen"	Bottom two
7	Stig	"Laululeija"	Safe

Show 4 (Second Round) – 24 February 2012
R/O	Artist	Song	Result
1	Kaisa Vala	"Habits of Human Beings"	Saved
2	Freeman and Uusi Fantasia	"Noitanainen"	—N/a

==== Final ====
The final took place on 25 February 2012 at the Helsinki Ice Hall in Helsinki where the six entries that qualified from the preceding four performance shows competed. The winner was selected over two rounds of public televoting. In the first round, the top three from the six competing entries qualified to the second round, the superfinal. In the superfinal, "När jag blundar" performed by Pernilla Karlsson was selected as the winner. In addition to the performances of the competing entries, the interval act featured The Rasmus, Anna Abreu, 2011 Finnish Eurovision entrant Paradise Oskar with Felix Zenger and Minna Tervamäki, and Eun-Ji Ha with Linda Haakana from the Finnish National Ballet.

Final – 25 February 2012
R/O	Artist	Song	Televote	Place
1	Iconcrash	"We Are the Night"	—	—
2	Pernilla Karlsson	"När jag blundar"	29.8%	1
3	Mica Ikonen	"Antaa mennä"	—	—
4	Kaisa Vala	"Habits of Human Beings"	—	—
5	Stig	"Laululeija"	17%	3
6	Ville Eetvartti	"Lasikaupunki"	18%	2

Superfinal – 25 February 2012
R/O	Artist	Song	Televote	Place
1	Pernilla Karlsson	"När jag blundar"	53.4%	1
2	Stig	"Laululeija"	17.8%	3
3	Ville Eetvartti	"Lasikaupunki"	28.7%	2

=== Promotion ===
Pernilla Karlsson specifically promoted "När jag blundar" as the Finnish Eurovision entry on 21 April 2012 by performing during the Eurovision in Concert event which was held at the Melkweg venue in Amsterdam, Netherlands and hosted by Cornald Maas and Ruth Jacott.

== At Eurovision ==
"När jag blundar" became only the second of Finland's Eurovision entries to be sung in the Swedish (which is an official language in Finland alongside Finnish). The only previous Swedish-language entry from Finland was "Fri" from 1990.

According to Eurovision rules, all nations with the exceptions of the host country and the "Big Five" (France, Germany, Italy, Spain and the United Kingdom) are required to qualify from one of two semi-finals in order to compete for the final; the top ten countries from each semi-final progress to the final. The European Broadcasting Union (EBU) split up the competing countries into six different pots based on voting patterns from previous contests, with countries with favourable voting histories put into the same pot. On 25 January 2012, a special allocation draw was held which placed each country into one of the two semi-finals, as well as which half of the show they would perform in. Finland was placed into the first semi-final, held on 22 May 2012, and was scheduled to perform in the first half of the show. The running order for the semi-finals was decided through another draw on 20 March 2012 and Finland was set to perform in position 9, following the entry from Belgium and before the entry from Israel.

The two semi-finals and the final were televised in Finland on Yle TV2 and Yle HD with commentary in Finnish by Tarja Närhi and Tobias Larsson. The three shows were also broadcast on YLE FST5 with commentary in Swedish by Eva Frantz and Johan Lindroos as well as via radio with Finnish commentary by Sanna Kojo and Jorma Hietamäki on Yle Radio Suomi. The Finnish spokesperson, who announced the Finnish votes during the final, was lead singer of Finnish Eurovision Song Contest 2006 winners Lordi, Mr Lordi.

=== Semi-finals ===
Pernilla Karlsson took part in technical rehearsals on 13 and 17 May, followed by dress rehearsals on 21 and 22 May. This included the jury show on 21 May where the professional juries of each country watched and voted on the competing entries. The Finnish performance featured Pernilla Karlsson performing in a green dress joined by cellist Heikki Takkula. The LED screens displayed golden sparkles and fireworks with additional red spotlights surrounding Karlsson. The performance also featured the use of a wind machine.

At the end of the show, Finland was not announced among the top 10 entries in the first semi-final and therefore failed to qualify to compete in the final. It was later revealed that Finland placed twelfth in the semi-final, receiving a total of 41 points.

=== Voting ===
Voting during the three shows consisted of 50 percent public televoting and 50 percent from a jury deliberation. The jury consisted of five music industry professionals who were citizens of the country they represent. This jury was asked to judge each contestant based on: vocal capacity; the stage performance; the song's composition and originality; and the overall impression by the act. In addition, no member of a national jury could be related in any way to any of the competing acts in such a way that they cannot vote impartially and independently. The following members comprised the Finnish jury: Patric Sarin, Sana Mustonen, Susanna Laine, Mikael Saari and Kyösti Salokorpi.

Following the release of the full split voting by the EBU after the conclusion of the competition, it was revealed that Finland had placed twelfth with both the public televote and the jury vote in the semi-final. In the public vote, Finland scored 36 points, while with the jury vote, Finland scored 57 points.

Below is a breakdown of points awarded to Finland and awarded by Finland in the first semi-final and grand final of the contest, and the breakdown of the jury voting and televoting conducted during the two shows:

==== Points awarded to Finland ====
Points awarded to Finland (Semi-final 1)
Score	Country
12 points	Hungary
10 points	
8 points	Denmark
7 points	Iceland
6 points	Latvia
5 points	
4 points	
3 points	Ireland
2 points	Israel
1 point	Albania; Belgium; Switzerland

==== Points awarded by Finland ====
Points awarded by Finland (Semi-final 1)
Score	Country
12 points	Russia
10 points	Iceland
8 points	Denmark
7 points	Ireland
6 points	Moldova
5 points	Albania
4 points	Hungary
3 points	Israel
2 points	Belgium
1 point	Cyprus

Points awarded by Finland (Final)
Score	Country
12 points	Sweden
10 points	Estonia
8 points	Russia
7 points	Iceland
6 points	Albania
5 points	Denmark
4 points	Ireland
3 points	Spain
2 points	Serbia
1 point	Germany

Jury points awarded by Finland (Final)
Score	Country
12 points	Sweden
10 points	Estonia
8 points	Denmark
7 points	Spain
6 points	Russia
5 points	Iceland
4 points	France
3 points	Germany
2 points	Albania
1 point	Norway
