= Logi Pedro =

Icelandic-Angolan musician and record producer

- Born: Logi Pedro Stefánsson; 29 August 1992 (age 33); Aveiro, Portugal
- Website: logipedro.com

Logi Pedro (born August 29, 1992) is an Icelandic-Angolan musician and record producer. He released his first solo album "Litlir svartir strákar" in 2018 to critical acclaim in Iceland. The lead single "Dúfan mín" received platinum status and was nominated as Song of the Year at the 2019 Icelandic Music Awards.

Logi Pedro was a founding member of Icelandic band Retro Stefson. He has produced records for a number of international acts, such as GusGus, Loah and Emmsjé Gauti.

Logi Pedro hosts the television show "Börn þjóða" on Stöð 2. Logi Pedro also co-wrote and starred in the documentary Stóra myndin: Covid og heimsbyggðin on RÚV.

== Awards and recognition ==
At the 2017 Icelandic Music Awards, Logi produced Pop Song of the Year for "I'll Walk With You" by Icelandic singer Hildur. He was nominated for Song of the Year at the Icelandic Music Awards 2019 and Best Rap Album of the Year at the 2021 Icelandic Music Awards for Undir bláu tungli.

== Discography ==
- Undir bláu tungli (2020)
- Litlir svartir strákar (2018)

== Filmography ==
- Börn þjóða (2021) – Host
- Stóra myndin: Covid og heimsbyggðin (2021) – Host
- Mannasiðir (2018) – Composer
- Jökulinn logar (2016) – Composer
