= Romania in the Eurovision Song Contest 2013 =

- Eurovision Song Contest 2013
- Participating broadcaster: Televiziunea Română (TVR)
- Country: Romania
- Selection process: Selecția Națională 2013
- Selection date: Semi-finals: 23 February 2013; 24 February 2013; Final: 9 March 2013

Competing entry
- Song: "It's My Life"
- Artist: Cezar
- Songwriters: Cristian Faur

Placement
- Semi-final result: Qualified (5th, 83 points)
- Final result: 13th, 65 points

Participation chronology

Romania was represented at the Eurovision Song Contest 2013 with the song "It's My Life" written by Cristian Faur. The song was performed by Cezar. The Romanian broadcaster Televiziunea Română (TVR) organised the national final Selecția Națională 2013 in order to select the Romanian entry for the 2013 contest in Malmö, Sweden. The national final consisted of three shows: two semi-finals on 23 and 24 February 2013, respectively, and a final on 9 March 2013. A total of thirty-two entries were selected and sixteen competed in each semi-final where six entries were selected to advance to the final. The twelve qualifiers competed in the final where "It's My Life" performed by Cezar was selected as the winner after scoring top marks from a seven-member jury panel and a public televote.

Romania was drawn to compete in the second semi-final of the Eurovision Song Contest which took place on 16 May 2013. Performing as the closing entry during the show in position 17, "It's My Life" was announced among the top 10 entries of the second semi-final and therefore qualified to compete in the final on 18 May. It was later revealed that Romania placed fifth out of the 17 participating countries in the semi-final with 83 points. In the final, Romania performed in position 14 and placed thirteenth out of the 26 participating countries, scoring 65 points.

== Background ==
Prior to the 2013 contest, Romania had participated in the Eurovision Song Contest 14 times since its first entry in 1994. To this point, its highest placing in the contest has been third place, which the nation achieved on two occasions: in 2005 with the song "Let Me Try" performed by Luminița Anghel and Sistem, and in 2010 with the song "Playing with Fire" performed by Paula Seling and Ovi. To this point, Romania has qualified to the final on every occasion since the introduction of semi-finals to the format of the contest in 2004. In 2012, "Zaleilah" by Mandinga placed 12th in the final.

The Romanian national broadcaster, Televiziunea Română (TVR), broadcasts the event within Romania and organizes the selection process for the nation's entry. TVR has consistently selected the Romanian Eurovision entry through national finals that feature a competition among several artists and songs. The broadcaster confirmed their intentions to participate at the 2013 Eurovision Song Contest on 31 May 2012. TVR had set up national finals with several artists to choose both the song and performer to compete at Eurovision for Romania, a procedure which the broadcaster opted for once again to select their 2013 entry.

== Before Eurovision ==
=== Selecția Națională 2013 ===
Selecția Națională 2013 was the national final organised by TVR in order to select Romania's entry for the Eurovision Song Contest 2013. The competition consisted of three shows: two semi-final featuring sixteen songs each to be held on 23 and 24 February 2013, respectively, and a final featuring twelve songs to be held on 9 March 2013. All shows took place at the TVR studios in Bucharest and were hosted by Paula Seling and Ovi which represented Romania in the Eurovision Song Contest 2010, Andreea Bănică and Marius Rizea with Oana Vlădescu and Toader Păun hosting segments from the green room. The three shows were televised on TVR1, TVR HD, TVRi as well as online via the broadcaster's streaming service TVR+. The official Eurovision Song Contest website eurovision.tv also provided an online stream for the competition.

==== Competing entries ====
TVR opened a submission period for artists and composers to submit their entries between 14 January 2013 and 3 February 2013. The broadcaster received 148 submissions after the submission deadline passed. Auditions were held between 6 and 14 February 2013 at the TVR studios across Romania in Iaşi, Cluj-Napoca, Timișoara, Craiova and Bucharest where a five-member expert committee consisting of Dan Manoliu (head of the Romanian delegation at the Eurovision Song Contest), Liana Elekes (producer), Eduard Cârcotă (composer), Andrei Tudor (composer) and Mihai Ogăşanu (composer) selected thirty-two entries for the national final. Among the competing artists were Luminița Anghel, who previously represented Romania in the Eurovision Song Contest in 2005, and Natalia Barbu, who previously represented Moldova in the Eurovision Song Contest in 2007.

Artist	Song	Songwriter(s)
9 Gardens	"All for Naught"	Cary Shields, Dan Secheli, Florin Ștefan, Radu Iaszberenyi
ABCD	"Final de război"	Cristina Haios, Gabriel Maga
Al Mike feat. Renée Santana	"What Is Love"	Mihai Alexandru, Alexandra Niculae
Alin Văduva	"Storyline"	Kevin Borg, Simon Gribbe, Alin Văduva, Aidan O'Connor
Andrei Leonte	"Paralyzed"	Mike Eriksson, Johnny Sanchez, Michael James Down, Jonas Thander
Anthony	"Dream Girl"	Marcus Frenell, Frederik Randquist, Hanif Sabzevari, Jimi Thiesen, Michael James Down
Brigitta and Mihai feat. TIPS	"One Heart"	Tudor Nițu, David Ciente, Brigitta Szebenyi
Casa Presei	"Un refren"	Gabriel Basarebescu, Robert Turcescu
Claudiu Mirea	"I Feel So High"	Daniel Alexandrescu, Claudiu Mirea
Cristian Prăjescu	"The Best Thing in Life is to Love"	Sergiu Rudichi
Diana Hetea	"I Believe In Love"	Jonas Gladnikoff, Johnny Sanchez, Sara Ljunggren, Michael James Down, Anders Kollerfors
Diana Matei	"Ma Ma He"	Diana Matei, Gabriel Alexandru
Edict	"Buddy Buddy"	Valeriu Cataraga, Anatol Neagu
Electric Fence	"Emilia"	David Ciente, Elena Luminița Vasile, Antonio Eduard Antemir, Lucian Indre
Elena Cârstea Muttart	"Spinning"	Elena Cârstea Muttart, Cristian Faur
Florin Cezar Ouatu	"It's My Life"	Cristian Faur
FreeStay	"Criminal Mind"	Matei Alexandru Mihai, Florin Ristei
Jul	"Wake Me Up"	Victor Bouroșu, Cristian Paul Iacob
Leticia	"We Are One"	Radu Alexandrescu, Sandu Ștefan
Liviu Mititelu	"La donna di nero"	Liviu Mititelu
Luminița Anghel	"Unique"	Rafael Herrero, Jose Juan Santana Rodriguez
Maximilian Muntean	"Broken Heart"	Petru Călinescu
Mosquito	"Feel The Same"	Gabriel Băruța, Edi Enache
Narcis Iustin Ianău	"Seven"	Narcis Iustin Ianău, Dan Horațiu Dumitraș
Natalia Barbu	"Confession"	Ana Sîrbu, Radu Sîrbu
Ovidiu Anton	"Run Away With Me"	Ovidiu Anton
Phaser	"Pour toi et pour moi"	Florin Pop-Magda, Tinu Vidaicu, Lucian Oprișan, Arnold Birta, Carina Dumitru, Radu Racz, Corian Păun
Spin and Cezar Dometi	"Silver Lining"	Cătălin Tuță Popescu, Răzvan Cârligeanu
Station 4	"Your Heart Is Telling Me So"	Mihai Alexandru, Marian Stancu, Constantin Axinte Amza
Tammy	"Firebird"	Zoltan Pop
Tudor Turcu	"Hello"	Călin Pop, Norbert Kovacs
The Zuralia Orchestra	"Sukar Transylvania"	Aurel Mirea

==== Semi-finals ====
The two semi-finals took place on 23 and 24 February 2013. In each semi-final sixteen songs competed and six qualified to the final based on the 50/50 combination of the votes from a seven-member jury panel and public televoting. The members of the jury panel that voted during the semi-finals were: George Natsis (composer), Alexandra Cepraga (musical director), Crina Mardare (composer), Eduard Cârcotă (composer), Andrei Tudor (composer), Dana Dorian (music critic) and Mihai Ogăşanu (composer).

In addition to the performances of the competing entries, the interval act featured performances from the show hosts Paula Seling, Ovi, Andreea Bănică and Marius Rizea performing the ABBA songs "Mamma Mia" and "Fernando" in the first and second semi-finals, respectively.

Semi-final 1 – 23 February 2013
R/O	Artist	Song	Jury		Televote		Total	Place
R/O	Artist	Song	Votes	Points	Votes	Points	Total	Place
1	Tudor Turcu	"Hello"	17	2	2,105	7	9	6
2	Casa Presei	"Un refren"	10	1	6,886	12	13	3
3	Electric Fence	"Emilia"	43	6	1,862	5	11	4
4	Diana Hetea	"I Believe In Love"	20	3	578	0	3	12
5	Station 4	"Your Heart Is Telling Me So"	9	0	1,274	3	3	11
6	Edict	"Buddy Buddy"	9	0	274	0	0	16
7	FreeStay	"Criminal Mind"	44	7	1,542	4	11	5
8	Maximilian Muntean	"Broken Heart"	3	0	778	1	1	14
9	Brigitta and Mihai feat. TIPS	"One Heart"	34	5	734	0	5	9
10	Natalia Barbu	"Confession"	4	0	850	2	2	13
11	Spin and Cezar Dometi	"Silver Lining"	31	4	689	0	4	10
12	Liviu Mititelu	"La donna di nero"	0	0	2,028	6	6	8
13	Florin Cezar Ouatu	"It's My Life"	52	10	2,401	8	18	2
14	Tammy	"Firebird"	0	0	613	0	0	15
15	Luminița Anghel	"Unique"	80	12	3,038	10	22	1
16	Anthony	"Dream Girl"	44	8	703	0	8	7

Detailed Jury Votes
R/O	Song	G. Natsis	A. Cepraga	E. Cârcotă	C. Mardare	A. Tudor	D. Dorian	M. Ogășanu	Total
1	"Hello"	4		3	7			3	17
2	"Un refren"		3	4			3		10
3	"Emilia"	10	8	6	3	8	6	2	43
4	"I Believe In Love"		2		8	4		6	20
5	"Your Heart Is Telling Me So"	3		2	1	2	1		9
6	"Buddy Buddy"	2	3	1			2	1	9
7	"Criminal Mind"	7	7	8	2	7	5	8	44
8	"Broken Heart"					3			3
9	"One Heart"	6	4		12	5		7	34
10	"Confession"						4		4
11	"Silver Lining"	1	2	5	5	1	7	10	31
12	"La donna di nero"								0
13	"It's My Life"	5	10	10	4	10	8	5	52
14	"Firebird"								0
15	"Unique"	12	12	12	10	12	10	12	80
16	"Dream Girl"	8	1	7	6	6	12	4	44

Semi-final 2 – 24 February 2013
R/O	Artist	Song	Jury		Televote		Total	Place
R/O	Artist	Song	Votes	Points	Votes	Points	Total	Place
1	Ovidiu Anton	"Run Away With Me"	42	5	1,414	4	9	6
2	Leticia	"We Are One"	0	0	792	0	0	16
3	Mosquito	"Feel the Same"	26	3	654	0	3	12
4	Alin Văduva	"Storyline"	10	2	447	0	2	14
5	Al Mike feat. Renée Santana	"What Is Love"	68	10	1,030	3	13	3
6	Diana Matei	"Ma Ma He"	0	0	963	2	2	13
7	9 Gardens	"All for Naught"	43	6	468	0	6	10
8	The Zuralia Orchestra	"Sukar Transylvania"	6	0	2,455	8	8	7
9	ABCD	"Final de război"	45	7	771	0	7	9
10	Elena Cârstea Muttart	"Spinning"	71	12	2,112	6	18	1
11	Narcis Iustin Ianău	"Seven"	1	0	3,108	12	12	4
12	Claudiu Mirea	"I Feel So High"	26	4	821	0	4	11
13	Andrei Leonte	"Paralyzed"	49	8	1,585	5	13	2
14	Cristian Prăjescu	"The Best Thing in Life Is to Love"	8	0	2,678	10	10	5
15	Jul	"Wake Me Up"	3	0	910	1	1	15
16	Phaser	"Pour toi et pour moi"	8	1	2,418	7	8	8

Detailed Jury Votes
R/O	Song	G. Natsis	A. Cepraga	E. Cârcotă	C. Mardare	A. Tudor	D. Dorian	M. Ogășanu	Total
1	"Run Away With Me"	8	8	2	3	6	7	8	42
2	"We Are One"								0
3	"Feel the Same"	1	7	4	2	5	4	3	26
4	"Storyline"	3	1	1	5				10
5	"What Is Love"	10	10	6	12	8	10	12	68
6	"Ma Ma He"								0
7	"All for Naught"	6	6	8	10	4	2	7	43
8	"Sukar Transylvania"					1		5	6
9	"Final de război"	7	5	7	7	7	6	6	45
10	"Spinning"	12	12	5	8	12	12	10	71
11	"Seven"							1	1
12	"I Feel So High"	2	3	10	4	2	3	2	26
13	"Paralyzed"	5	4	12	6	10	8	4	49
14	"The Best Thing in Life Is to Love"	4				3	1		8
15	"Wake Me Up"			3					3
16	"Pour toi et pour moi"		2		1		5		8

==== Final ====
The final took place on 9 March 2013. Twelve songs competed and the winner, "It's My Life" performed by Florin Cezar Ouatu, was determined by the 50/50 combination of the votes from a seven-member jury panel and public televoting. The members of the jury panel that voted in the final were: George Natsis (composer), Alexandra Cepraga (musical director), Crina Mardare (composer), Eduard Cârcotă (composer), Andrei Tudor (composer), Ştefan Naftanailă (radio presenter) and Mihai Ogăşanu (composer). In addition to the performances of the competing entries, the interval acts featured performances from the show hosts Paula Seling and Ovi, and Andreea Bănică, and 2013 Belarusian Eurovision entrant Alyona Lanskaya performing her Eurovision song "Solayoh".

Final – 9 March 2013
R/O	Artist	Song	Jury		Televote		Total	Place
R/O	Artist	Song	Votes	Points	Votes	Points	Total	Place
1	Casa Presei	"Un refren"	19	2	8,552	10	12	4
2	Narcis Iustin Ianău	"Seven"	2	0	1,879	5	5	8
3	FreeStay	"Criminal Mind"	39	5	1,168	0	5	9
4	Elena Cârstea Muttart	"Spinning"	47	7	1,754	4	11	5
5	Luminița Anghel	"Unique"	65	10	7,469	8	18	3
6	Ovidiu Anton	"Run Away With Me"	20	3	536	0	3	11
7	Florin Cezar Ouatu	"It's My Life"	47	8	9,774	12	20	1
8	Cristian Prăjescu	"The Best Thing in Life is to Love"	10	0	1,672	3	3	10
9	Electric Fence	"Emilia"	67	12	3,619	7	19	2
10	Al Mike feat. Renée Santana	"What Is Love"	46	6	1,608	2	8	7
11	Tudor Turcu	"Hello"	27	4	3,260	6	10	6
12	Andrei Leonte	"Paralyzed"	17	1	1,276	1	2	12

Detailed Jury Votes
R/O	Song	G. Natsis	A. Cepraga	A. Tudor	C. Mardare	E. Cârcotă	Ş. Naftanăilă	M. Ogășanu	Total
1	"Un refren"	4	3	4	2		6		19
2	"Seven"						1	1	2
3	"Criminal Mind"	8	5	6	3	6	8	3	39
4	"Spinning"	7	7	7	5	7	7	7	47
5	"Unique"	12	12	10	7	12		12	65
6	"Run Away With Me"	2	4	3	4	2		5	20
7	"It's My Life"	3	8	12	1	10	5	8	47
8	"The Best Thing in Life is to Love"	6				1	3		10
9	"Emilia"	10	10	8	12	5	12	10	67
10	"What Is Love"	5	6	5	6	8	10	6	46
11	"Hello"	1	2	2	10	4	4	4	27
12	"Paralyzed"	0	1	1	8	3	2	2	17

=== Controversy ===
Following Selecția Națională 2013, a protest group on Facebook was created that sought to boycott the results and call into question jury member Ştefan Naftanailă who awarded zero points to Luminița Anghel. Anghel also accused that the zero points from Naftanailă, who claimed to have voted "taking into account the quality of the song, the interpretation and the performer's ability to cope with this contest", had something personal to do with her and was done intentionally in order for Cezar to win. Project manager of the competition, Dan Manoliu, stated that the results meet the criteria for the competition despite being also surprised with Naftanailă's votes.

=== Promotion ===
Cezar made several appearances across Europe to specifically promote "It's My Life" as the Romanian Eurovision entry. On 13 April, Cezar performed during the Eurovision in Concert event which was held at the Melkweg venue in Amsterdam, Netherlands and hosted by Marlayne and Linda Wagenmakers. On 21 April, Cezar performed during the London Eurovision Party, which was held at the Café de Paris venue in London, United Kingdom and hosted by Nicki French and Paddy O'Connell. On 28 April, Cezar took part in promotional activities in Brussels, Belgium where he performed during the Romanian Spring Festival which was held at the Fish Market Square, and the Le You Gay Tea Dance - You'rovision event which was held at the Le You venue.

== At Eurovision ==
Cezar presenting himself and "It's My Life" at the Eurovision Song Contest 2013

According to Eurovision rules, all nations with the exceptions of the host country and the "Big Five" (France, Germany, Italy, Spain and the United Kingdom) are required to qualify from one of two semi-finals in order to compete for the final; the top ten countries from each semi-final progress to the final. The European Broadcasting Union (EBU) split up the competing countries into six different pots based on voting patterns from previous contests, with countries with favourable voting histories put into the same pot. On 17 January 2013, an allocation draw was held which placed each country into one of the two semi-finals, as well as which half of the show they would perform in. Romania was placed into the second semi-final, to be held on 16 May 2013, and was scheduled to perform in the second half of the show.

Once all the competing songs for the 2013 contest had been released, the running order for the semi-finals was decided by the shows' producers rather than through another draw, so that similar songs were not placed next to each other. Romania was set to perform last in position 17, following the entry from Switzerland.

All three shows were broadcast in Romania on TVR1, TVRi and TVR HD with commentary by Liana Stanciu. The Romanian spokesperson, who announced the Romanian votes during the final, was Sonia Argint.

=== Semi-final ===
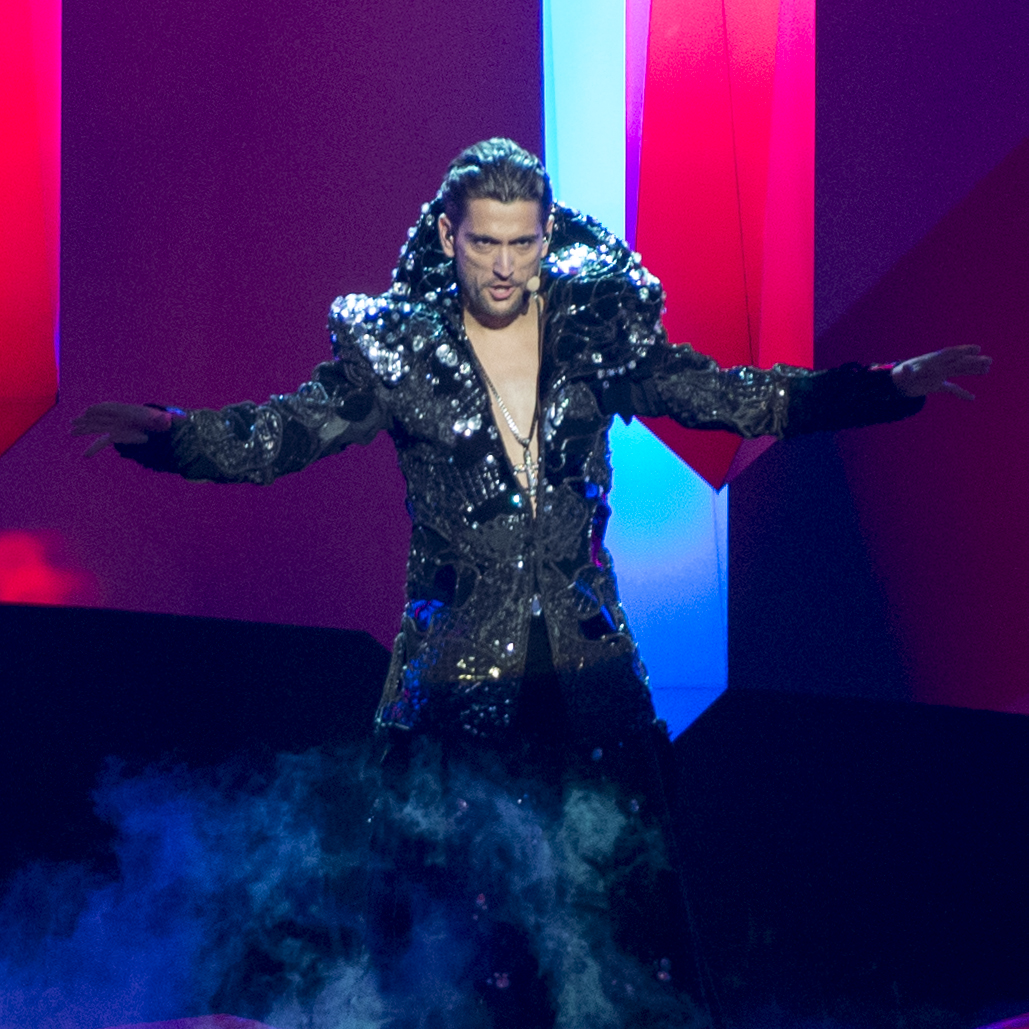
Cezar during a rehearsal before the second semi-final

Cezar took part in technical rehearsals on 9 and 11 May, followed by dress rehearsals on 15 and 16 May. This included the jury show on 15 May where the professional juries of each country watched and voted on the competing entries.

The stage show featured Cezar dressed in a long black sequin cloak with Swarovski stones designed by Doina Levintza. The performance began with Cezar standing between shards that were lowered from the rigging, who was then joined on stage by acrobatic dancers. The stage displayed red and blue colours with lightning bolts being projected on the rear screen. Towards the end of the song, both Cezar and the shards were raised from the stage with the dancers waving a huge piece of red material to his front. The performance also featured pyrotechnic flame effects, fireworks and confetti, the latter being used at the end of the performance. The four dancers that joined Cezar on stage were Florentin Munteanu, Sandra Mavhima, Simona Deaconescu and Sivu Mititelu, while an off-stage backing vocalist, Alexandra Toma, was also featured for the performance.

At the end of the show, Romania was announced as having finished in the top ten and subsequently qualifying for the grand final. It was later revealed that Romania placed fifth in the semi-final, receiving a total of 83 points.

=== Final ===
Shortly after the second semi-final, a winners' press conference was held for the ten qualifying countries. As part of this press conference, the qualifying artists took part in a draw to determine which half of the grand final they would subsequently participate in. This draw was done in the order the countries appeared in the semi-final running order. Romania was drawn to compete in the second half. Following this draw, the shows' producers decided upon the running order of the final, as they had done for the semi-finals. Romania was subsequently placed to perform in position 14, following the entry from Netherlands and before the entry from United Kingdom.

Cezar once again took part in dress rehearsals on 17 and 18 May before the final, including the jury final where the professional juries cast their final votes before the live show. Dorians performed a repeat of their semi-final performance during the final on 18 May. At the conclusion of the voting, Romania finished in thirteenth place with 65 points.

=== Voting ===
Voting during the three shows consisted of 50 percent public televoting and 50 percent from a jury deliberation. The jury consisted of five music industry professionals who were citizens of the country they represent. This jury was asked to judge each contestant based on: vocal capacity; the stage performance; the song's composition and originality; and the overall impression by the act. In addition, no member of a national jury could be related in any way to any of the competing acts in such a way that they cannot vote impartially and independently.

Following the release of the full split voting by the EBU after the conclusion of the competition, it was revealed that Romania had placed seventh with the public televote and twenty-fourth with the jury vote in the final. In the public vote, Romania received an average rank of 7.49, while with the jury vote, Romania received an average rank of 17.82. In the second semi-final, Romania placed first with the public televote with an average rank of 4.78 and thirteenth with the jury vote with an average rank of 9.70.

Below is a breakdown of points awarded to Romania and awarded by Romania in the second semi-final and grand final of the contest. The nation awarded its 12 points to Azerbaijan in the semi-final and to Moldova in the final of the contest.

==== Points awarded to Romania ====
Points awarded to Romania (Semi-final 2)
Score	Country
12 points	
10 points	Greece; Iceland; Israel; Malta
8 points	Azerbaijan
7 points	Germany
6 points	France; Norway
5 points	Albania
4 points	Finland
3 points	Armenia
2 points	Bulgaria
1 point	Macedonia; Spain

Points awarded to Romania (Final)
Score	Country
12 points	
10 points	Greece; Moldova
8 points	
7 points	Malta
6 points	Azerbaijan; Iceland; Norway
5 points	Albania
4 points	Austria; Sweden; United Kingdom
3 points	
2 points	
1 point	France; Italy; Montenegro

==== Points awarded by Romania ====
Points awarded by Romania (Semi-final 2)
Score	Country
12 points	Azerbaijan
10 points	Greece
8 points	Norway
7 points	Malta
6 points	Hungary
5 points	Armenia
4 points	San Marino
3 points	Finland
2 points	Israel
1 point	Bulgaria

Points awarded by Romania (Final)
Score	Country
12 points	Moldova
10 points	Azerbaijan
8 points	Norway
7 points	Greece
6 points	Denmark
5 points	Malta
4 points	Ukraine
3 points	United Kingdom
2 points	Netherlands
1 point	Italy

===== Jury rankings by Romania =====
Jury ranking by Romania (Semi-final 2)
Rank	Country
1	Azerbaijan
2	Greece
3	Norway
4	Malta
5	Albania
6	Finland
7	Georgia
8	San Marino
9	Iceland
10	Armenia
11	Israel
12	Latvia
13	Macedonia
14	Switzerland
15	Bulgaria
16	Hungary

Jury ranking by Romania (Final)
Rank	Country
1	Moldova
2	Netherlands
3	Malta
4	Azerbaijan
5	United Kingdom
6	Norway
7	Belgium
8	Italy
9	Sweden
10	Greece
11	Denmark
12	Georgia
13	Russia
14	Finland
15	Iceland
16	France
17	Ukraine
18	Estonia
19	Armenia
20	Germany
21	Ireland
22	Lithuania
23	Hungary
24	Spain
25	Belarus
