= Romania in the Eurovision Song Contest 2012 =

- Eurovision Song Contest 2012
- Participating broadcaster: Televiziunea Română (TVR)
- Country: Romania
- Selection process: Selecția Națională 2012
- Selection date: 10 March 2012

Competing entry
- Song: "Zaleilah"
- Artist: Mandinga
- Songwriters: Elena Ionescu; Costi Ioniță; Omar Secada

Placement
- Semi-final result: Qualified (3rd, 120 points)
- Final result: 12th, 71 points

Participation chronology

Romania was represented at the Eurovision Song Contest 2012 with the song "Zaleilah" written by Elena Ionescu, Costi Ioniță and Omar Secada. The song was performed by the band Mandinga. The Romanian broadcaster Televiziunea Română (TVR) organised the national final Selecția Națională 2012 in order to select the Romanian entry for the 2012 contest in Baku, Azerbaijan. Fifteen entries were selected to compete in the national final on 10 March 2012 where "Zaleilah" performed by Mandinga was selected as the winner after scoring top marks from a nine-member jury panel and a public televote.

Romania was drawn to compete in the first semi-final of the Eurovision Song Contest which took place on 22 May 2012. Performing during the show in position 6, "Zaleilah" was announced among the top 10 entries of the first semi-final and therefore qualified to compete in the final on 26 May. It was later revealed that Romania placed third out of the 18 participating countries in the semi-final with 120 points. In the final, Romania performed in position 14 and placed twelfth out of the 26 participating countries, scoring 71 points.

== Background ==
Prior to the 2012 contest, Romania had participated in the Eurovision Song Contest 13 times since its first entry in 1994. To this point, its highest placing in the contest has been third place, which the nation achieved on two occasions: in 2005 with the song "Let Me Try" performed by Luminița Anghel and Sistem, and in 2010 with the song "Playing with Fire" performed by Paula Seling and Ovi. To this point, Romania has qualified to the final on every occasion since the introduction of semi-finals to the format of the contest in 2004. In 2011, "Change" by Hotel FM placed 17th in the final.

The Romanian national broadcaster, Televiziunea Română (TVR), broadcasts the event within Romania and organizes the selection process for the nation's entry. TVR has consistently selected the Romanian Eurovision entry through national finals that feature a competition among several artists and songs. Despite rumours that TVR would not enter the 2012 Eurovision Song Contest due the lack of foundation, the broadcaster confirmed their intentions to participate on 13 January 2012 and pressured the European Broadcasting Union (EBU) to lower the entry fee, stating that "participation was only possible if 40% of all the costs that may occur could be funded through sponsorship". TVR had set up national finals with several artists to choose both the song and performer to compete at Eurovision for Romania, a procedure which the broadcaster opted for once again to select their 2012 entry after failed attempts to internally select singer Inna to represent Romania, which she declined due to commitments to her I Am the Club Rocker Tour for promoting her album under the same name.

== Before Eurovision ==
=== Selecția Națională 2012 ===
The logo of Selecția Națională 2012

Selecția Națională 2012 was the national final format developed by TVR in order to select Romania's entry for the Eurovision Song Contest 2012. The competition took place at the TVR studios in Bucharest on 10 March 2012 and was hosted by Iulia Pârlea, Constantin Trofin, Valentin Paraschiv, Bogdan Iacob, Gianina Corondan and David Zory. The show was televised on TVR1, TVR HD, TVRi as well as online via the broadcaster's website tvr.ro. The official Eurovision Song Contest website eurovision.tv also provided an online stream for the competition.

==== Competing entries ====
TVR opened a submission period for artists and composers to submit their entries between 6 February 2012 and 23 February 2012. A wishlist of 84 artists was also published in order to encourage composers to write songs for them. The broadcaster received 109 submissions after the submission deadline passed, of which 97 were eligible for consideration. An expert committee reviewed the received submissions on 28 February 2012 and selected fifteen entries for the national final. The committee also reserved the right to change the performer of a selected song and should this be the case, composers were required to submit the final version of their songs with its new performers. The competing entries were announced on 29 February 2012.

The members of the expert committee that selected the fifteen entries were:

- Dana Adam – MediaPro Music
- Dan Popi – Cat Music
- Cătălin Muraru – Roton Music
- Sorin Sfârlea – Universal Music Romania
- Manuel Dinculescu – Radio 21
- Tony Teşiu – Radio ZU
- Ştefan Naftanailă – Radio Romania
- Dana Dorian – music critic
- Eduard Cârcotă – composer
- Ovidiu Cernăuţeanu – singer-songwriter, represented Romania in 2010
- George Natsis – composer

TVR wishlist
- Akcent
- Alex Velea
- Alexa
- Alexandra Stan
- Alexandra Ungureanu
- Alin Văduva
- Alina Eremia
- Anda Adam
- Andra
- Andreea Bănică
- Annamari Dancs
- Antonia
- Aurelian Temișan
- Blaxy Girls
- Bogdan Bradu
- Cătălin Josan
- Claudia Pavel
- Corina
- Costi Ioniță
- Cristian Sanda
- Cristina Vasiu
- Dalma Kovács
- Dan Bălan
- Delia Matache
- Desperado
- Direcția 5
- DJ Project
- Dya
- Edward Maya
- Elena Gheorghe
- ~~Ellie White~~
- Fly Project
- Giulia
- Holograf
- Horia Brenciu
- Hotel FM
- ~~Inna~~
- Ionuț Ungureanu
- Irina Popa
- Jasmine
- Kamelia
- Keo
- Laurențiu Cazan
- Laurențiu Duță
- Leo Iorga
- Liviu Teodorescu
- Lora
- Loredana Groza
- Lucia Dumitrescu
- Luminița Anghel
- Mandinga
- Marcel Pavel
- Maria Radu
- The Marker
- Mihai Trăistariu
- Miki
- Mona and Liviu Hodor
- Monica Anghel
- Morandi
- Natalia Barbu
- Nico
- Nicola
- Noni
- Ovidiu Cernăuțeanu
- Pasager
- Pasha
- Paula Seling
- Pepe
- Proconsul
- Răzvan Krivach
- RedBlonde
- Silvia Ștefănescu
- Simona Nae
- Smiley
- Ștefan Bănică Jr.
- Tabasco
- Tara
- Tavi Colen
- Taxi
- Tica Alexe
- Tony Tomas
- Voltaj
- Vunk
- Zero

Artist	Song	Songwriter(s)
Ana Mardare	"If You Find Simple Words to Say"	Tudy Zaharescu, Ana Madare
Ana Mardare	"This Must Be Love"	Tudy Zaharescu, Michael James Down, Primož Poglajen, Jonas Gladnikoff, Ana Madare
Bianca Purcărea	"Don't Say Sorry"	Bart Herman, Bianca Purcărea, Marc Paelinck
Cătălin Josan	"Call My Name"	Keo, Ralflo, Bogdan Mureşan, James Alexander
Electric Fence	"Șun-ta"	Antonio Eduard Antemir, Lucian Daniel Indre, Elena Vasile, David Ciente, Aurel Sandu
Ioana Bianca Anuța	"Girls Don't Cry"	Ioana Bianca Anuța, Gerard James Borg
Lucian Oros	"The Best a Man Can Get"	Mats Tärnfors, Gerard James Borg, Lucian Oros
Mandinga	"Zaleilah"	Elena Ionescu, Costi Ioniță, Omar Secada
Miss Mary	"Rollin'"	Nicolae George Onea, Bogdan Florin Vlăsceanu, Loredana Sechelariu, Paul Gabriel Turcu, Maria Alexandra Florea
Ovidiu Anton	"I Walk Alone"	Ovidiu Anton
Raluca Ocneanu	"Time Is On My Side"	Mihai Alexandru, Japhet Niven
RPK	"Singura care"	Laurenţiu Nicolae Zmau, Karoly Boer, Mihai Togănel Radu, Robert Mihail Ionescu, Cristian Augustin Ungur
T&L	"Twilight"	Bianca Purcarea, Karl Broderick, Žiga Pirnat, Andraz Gliha
Tasha	"Say My Name"	Sebastian Vlad Muştiuc, Andrei Stanca, Claudiu Costin Cristescu
Viky Red	"If You Ever Feel"	Victor Bouroşu, Silviu Păduraru, Marian Crăciun, Alexandru Constantin, Victor Astani Răzvan, Alina Toma

==== Final ====
The final took place on 10 March 2012. Fifteen songs competed and the winner, "Zaleilah" performed by Mandinga, was determined by the 50/50 combination of the votes from a nine-member jury panel and public televoting. The members of the jury panel that voted were: George Natsis (composer), Dan Teodorescu (singer-songwriter, represented Romania in 2000 as part of Taxi), Mihai Ogăşanu (composer), Cornel Ilie (composer), Eduard Cârcotă (composer), Luminiţa Anghel (singer, represented Romania in 2005), Liliana Levintza (music event organiser), Dana Dorian (music critic) and George Zafiu (radio DJ). In addition to the performances of the competing entries, the interval acts featured performances by Hotel FM, who represented Romania in 2011, Anggun, who would represent France in 2012 performing her Eurovision song "Echo (You and I)" and Jedward, who would represent Ireland in 2012 performing their Eurovision song "Waterline".

Final – 10 March 2012
R/O	Artist	Song	Jury		Televote		Total	Place
R/O	Artist	Song	Votes	Points	Votes	Points	Total	Place
1	Cătălin Josan	"Call My Name"	80	8	2,390	10	18	3
2	Ana Mardare	"If You Find Simple Words to Say"	45	6	785	0	6	8
3	Viky Red	"If You Ever Feel"	12	0	1,000	4	4	10
4	RPK	"Singura care"	12	0	712	0	0	15
5	Lucian Oros	"The Best a Man Can Get"	9	0	1,097	5	5	9
6	Raluca Ocneanu	"Time Is On My Side"	22	4	725	0	4	11
7	Electric Fence	"Șun-ta"	96	12	2,143	7	19	2
8	Ovidiu Anton	"I Walk Alone"	74	7	872	2	9	5
9	Miss Mary	"Rollin'"	13	2	532	0	2	14
10	Mandinga	"Zaleilah"	83	10	6,930	12	22	1
11	T&L	"Twilight"	7	0	1,226	6	6	6
12	Ioana Bianca Anuța	"Girls Don't Cry"	13	1	2,325	8	9	4
13	Tasha	"Say My Name"	27	5	853	1	6	7
14	Bianca Purcărea	"Don't Say Sorry"	12	0	936	3	3	12
15	Ana Mardare	"This Must Be Love"	17	3	265	0	3	13

=== Promotion ===
Mandinga made several appearances across Europe to specifically promote "Zaleilah" as the Romanian Eurovision entry. On 21 April, Mandinga performed during the Eurovision in Concert event which was held at the Melkweg venue in Amsterdam, Netherlands and hosted by Ruth Jacott and Cornald Maas. On 29 April, Mandinga took part in promotional activities in Brussels, Belgium where they performed during the Romanian Spring Festival which was held at the Fish Market Square, and the You Gay Tea Dance : Let's YOUROVISION event which was held at the Le You nightclub.

== At Eurovision ==
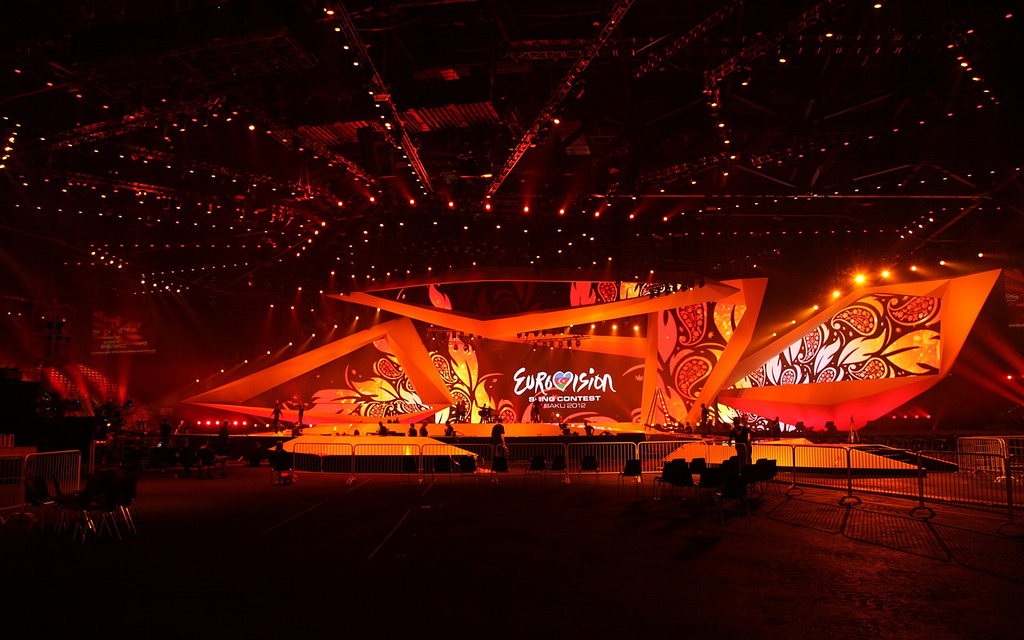
The Eurovision Song Contest 2012 took place at the Baku Crystal Hall in Baku, Azerbaijan

According to Eurovision rules, all nations with the exceptions of the host country and the "Big Five" (France, Germany, Italy, Spain and the United Kingdom) are required to qualify from one of two semi-finals in order to compete for the final; the top ten countries from each semi-final progress to the final. The European Broadcasting Union (EBU) split up the competing countries into six different pots based on voting patterns from previous contests, with countries with favourable voting histories put into the same pot. On 25 January 2012, a special allocation draw was held which placed each country into one of the two semi-finals, as well as which half of the show they would perform in. Romania was placed into the first semi-final, to be held on 22 May 2012, and was scheduled to perform in the first half of the show. The running order for the semi-finals was decided through another draw on 20 March 2012 and Romania was set to perform in position 6, following the entry from Albania and before the entry from Switzerland.

All three shows were broadcast in Romania on TVR1, TVRi and TVR HD with commentary by Leonard Miron and Gianina Corondan. The Romanian spokesperson, who announced the Romanian votes during the final, was Paula Seling who previously represented Romania in 2010.

=== Semi-final ===
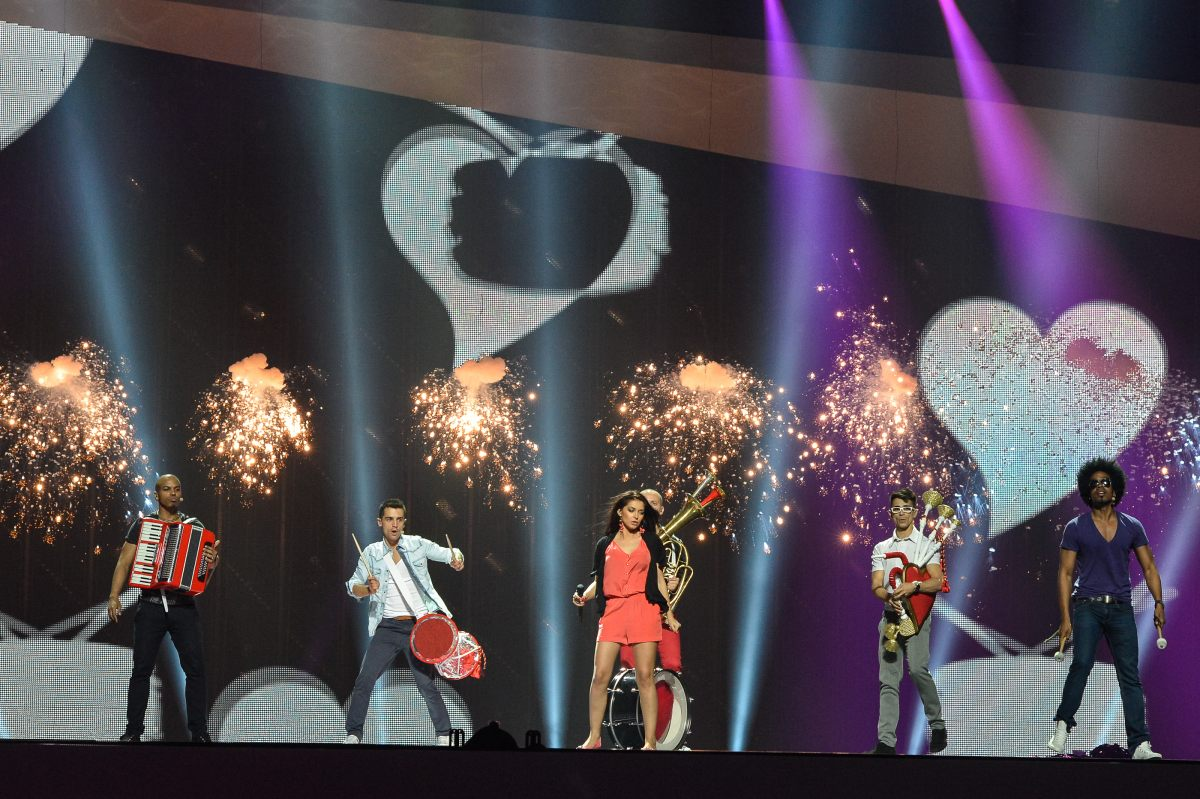
Mandinga during a rehearsal before the first semi-final

Mandinga took part in technical rehearsals on 13 and 17 May, followed by dress rehearsals on 21 and 22 May. This included the jury show on 21 May where the professional juries of each country watched and voted on the competing entries.

The stage show featured the members of Mandinga dressed in outfits designed by Maria Lucia Hohan and Florin Dobre and performing a "heart" dance routine choreographed by Anze Skrube. The background LED screens transitioned from displaying images of moving drums and beating hearts in various colours including purple, yellow and orange, to purple colours and shadows of people partying in strobe lighting towards the end of the song. The performance also featured pyrotechnic firework and flame effects.

At the end of the show, Romania was announced as having finished in the top ten and subsequently qualifying for the grand final. It was later revealed that Romania placed third in the semi-final, receiving a total of 120 points.

=== Final ===
Shortly after the first semi-final, a winners' press conference was held for the ten qualifying countries. As part of this press conference, the qualifying artists took part in a draw to determine the running order for the final. This draw was done in the order the countries were announced during the semi-final. Romania was drawn to perform in position 14, following the entry from Azerbaijan and before the entry from Denmark.

Mandinga once again took part in dress rehearsals on 25 and 26 May before the final, including the jury final where the professional juries cast their final votes before the live show. The band performed a repeat of their semi-final performance during the final on 26 May. Romania placed twelfth in the final, scoring 71 points.

=== Voting ===
Voting during the three shows consisted of 50 percent public televoting and 50 percent from a jury deliberation. The jury consisted of five music industry professionals who were citizens of the country they represent. This jury was asked to judge each contestant based on: vocal capacity; the stage performance; the song's composition and originality; and the overall impression by the act. In addition, no member of a national jury could be related in any way to any of the competing acts in such a way that they cannot vote impartially and independently.

Following the release of the full split voting by the EBU after the conclusion of the competition, it was revealed that Romania had placed seventh with the public televote and twentieth with the jury vote in the final. In the public vote, Romania scored 117 points, while with the jury vote, Romania scored 53 points. In the first semi-final, Romania placed second with the public televote with 132 points and fifth with the jury vote, scoring 87 points.

Below is a breakdown of points awarded to Romania and awarded by Romania in the first semi-final and grand final of the contest. The nation awarded its 12 points to Greece in the semi-final and to Moldova in the final of the contest.

==== Points awarded to Romania ====
Points awarded to Romania (Semi-final 1)
Score	Country
12 points	Ireland; Moldova; Spain
10 points	Italy
8 points	Greece; Israel; Russia
7 points	Azerbaijan; Montenegro
6 points	Cyprus; San Marino
5 points	Albania; Austria
4 points	Belgium; Iceland
3 points	Hungary
2 points	Switzerland
1 point	Denmark

Points awarded to Romania (Final)
Score	Country
12 points	Moldova
10 points	Spain
8 points	
7 points	Italy; Greece
6 points	Azerbaijan; Israel
5 points	Ireland
4 points	Portugal; Turkey
3 points	Belgium; Cyprus
2 points	France
1 point	Denmark; Russia

==== Points awarded by Romania ====
Points awarded by Romania (Semi-final 1)
Score	Country
12 points	Greece
10 points	Moldova
8 points	Hungary
7 points	Cyprus
6 points	Russia
5 points	Israel
4 points	Albania
3 points	Denmark
2 points	Switzerland
1 point	Belgium

Points awarded by Romania (Final)
Score	Country
12 points	Moldova
10 points	Sweden
8 points	Greece
7 points	Hungary
6 points	Spain
5 points	Serbia
4 points	Russia
3 points	Turkey
2 points	Cyprus
1 point	Albania

== See also ==
- List of music released by Romanian artists that has charted in major music markets
