= Energia (band) =

English musical group

Energia are an English dance-pop/house/electronica production act, consisting of record producer/composer Mark Andrewes and various guest vocalists. They are best known for appearing in the UK national selection for the Eurovision Song Contest in 1999, and the San Marino Song Contest in 2025. The track "Get The Freak Out" represented the United Kingdom in the 2006 Euro Video Grand Prix, the European Music Video Festival.

== Career ==
The act was formed in 1999 to front an entry for the Eurovision Song Contest "All Time High", featuring vocalist Ann McCabe, which reached the final eight in the Great British Song Contest.

Several club chart hits followed, including the self-titled "Energia", and its vocal version "I’m Alive", which charted on two official UK club charts, reaching number 8 in the Music Week upfront club breakers chart and number 11 in the commercial pop chart.

In 2006 their track "Get The Freak Out", featuring Irina, was chosen to represent the United Kingdom in the 2006 Euro Video Grand Prix, the European Music Video Festival. Irina is Irina Gligor, who has also appeared in the 2004 Eurovision Song Contest, having co-written the entry for Romania, "I Admit", performed by Sanda. Irina was a vocalist in Sanda's backing group.

"This Game", a cover version of a 1980s record by the band President Reagan is Clever, reached number 9 in the Music Week upfront club chart in July 2007.

In January 2025, Energia qualified for the semi-finals of the San Marino Song Contest, the San Marino national selection for the Eurovision Song Contest, with the song "Sad Rags". This line-up of the band featured lead vocalist Jake Hayes, with additional vocals by Iain Terry, James Raynard, Sam Quinlan, Sebastiaan Douma and Mark Andrewes.

In August 2026, Energia released "Eltonicity", an album of electronic cover versions of Elton John songs featuring tracks from each decade of his career.

== Discography ==
=== Singles ===
- 1999: "All Time High"
- 2003: "Energia"
- 2003: "I'm Alive"
- 2004: "Synergy"
- 2005: "Get The Freak Out" (featuring Irina)
- 2007: "This Game" – Biondi Records
- 2008: "The Life I Live"
- 2009: "Knocked Out"
- 2019: "Misjudged"
- 2020: "Come On"
- 2021: "Get You Back"
- 2022: "Into The Rhythm"
- 2022: "It's Fake"
- 2022: "Me Against The World"
- 2022: "Fever"
- 2023: "Look Who's Talking"
- 2023: "Energised"
- 2023: "Fame Sweet Fame"
- 2023: "Give You Up"
- 2024: "Back in Time"
- 2024: "Adrift"
- 2024: "Higher Energy"
- 2024: "Don't Let Life Get You Down"
- 2025: "Sad Rags"
- 2026: "Someone Saved My Life Tonight"
- 2026: "Grey Seal"
- 2026: "This Train Don't Stop There Anymore"
- 2026: "Rocket Man"
- 2026: "Circle of Life"

=== Albums ===
- 2004: 15 Years of Biondi Music – Energia/ Various Artists – Biondi Records
- 2014: 25 Years of Biondi Music – Energia/ Various Artists – Biondi Records
- 2023: "Energised"
- 2025: "Retro Night"
- 2026: "Eltonicity"
