= Florin Cezar Ouatu =

Cezar
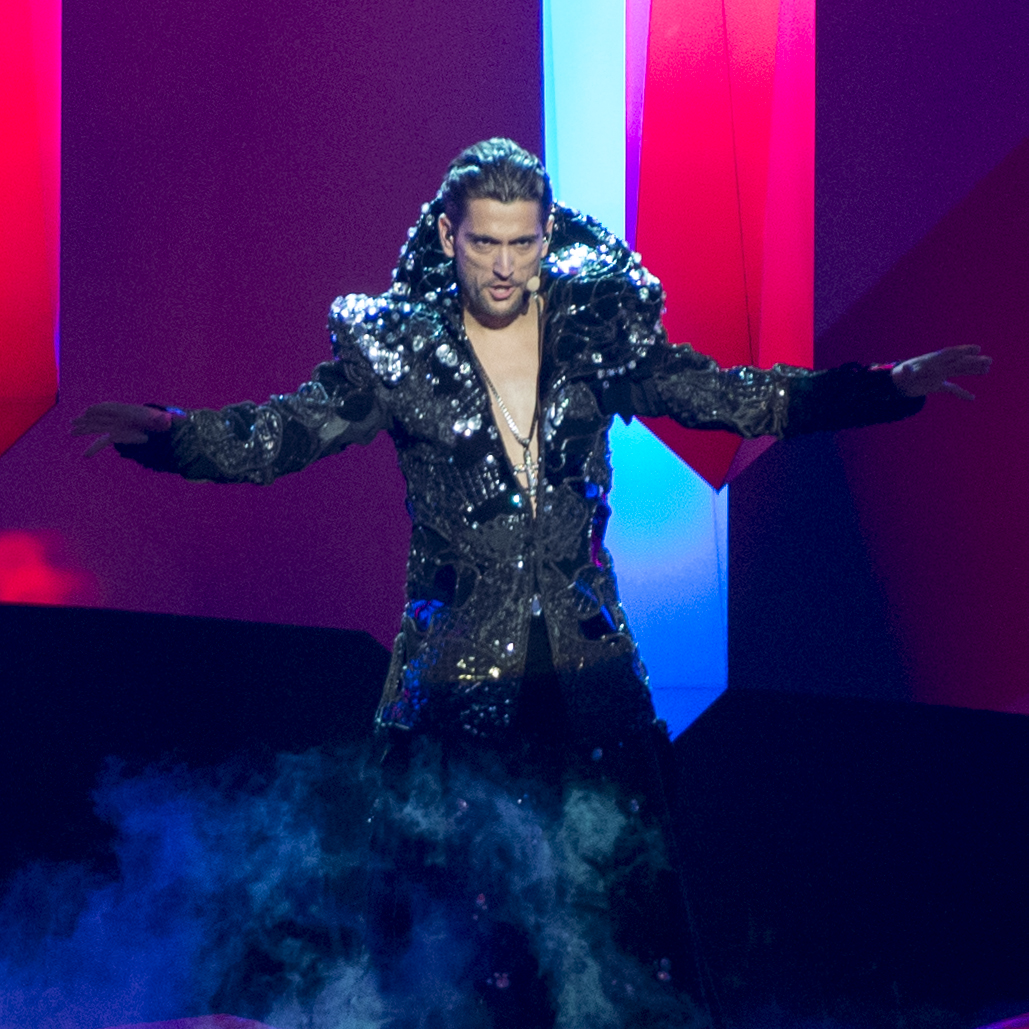
- Cezar at the Eurovision Song Contest 2013, in Malmö

Background information
- Born: Florin Cezar Ouatu; 18 February 1980 (age 46); Ploiești, Romania
- Origin: Romanian
- Genres: Opera, operatic pop, jazz, disco opera
- Occupations: Singer, pianist
- Instruments: Vocals, piano
- Years active: 2004–present
- Label: HaHaHa Production

Cezar presenting himself and his Eurovision song.

Florin Cezar Ouatu (Romanian pronunciation: [floˈrin ˈt͡ʃezar oˈwatu]; born 18 February 1980), known as Cezar or by the nickname the Voice (Romanian: Vocea), is a Romanian opera countertenor, singer, and pianist.

== Biography ==
Son of the late flautist and former teacher at Mozarteum University of Salzburg, Florin Ouatu, he was born into a family of musicians in Ploiești. Cezar began playing piano at six years of age. He graduated from the "Carmen Sylva" School of Arts in his hometown and the Milan Conservatory. In Italy, Cezar graduated the bel canto classical singing section with maximum mark. He has also studied Baroque music. In 2001, Ouatu was accepted to the Giuseppe Verdi Music Academy in Milan, and graduated in 2004. In the 2003 International Singing Contest Francisco Viñas and in the 2005 International Voice Competition organized by the Renata Tebaldi Foundation in San Marino he won the "Best Countertenor" prize. Cezar made his professional opera stage debut in 2007 at La Fenice, Venice. He has since appeared in further opera performances in Baroque opera roles.

Ouatu released his first pop-opera single "Cinema Paradiso" on Christmas Eve, 24 December 2012. In May 2013, Cezar represented Romania in the Eurovision Song Contest 2013 with the song "It's My Life", and finished in 13th place with 65 points at the end of the contest. A week later, on 25 May 2013, he performed alongside Andrea Bocelli and Angela Gheorghiu at Bocelli's concert in Romania at the Romexpo, which led to a collaboration with Vangelis.

In 2018, he auditioned for the UK X Factor.

Awards and achievements
| Preceded by Mandinga with "Zaleilah" | Romania in the Eurovision Song Contest; 2013 | Succeeded by Paula Seling and Ovi with "Miracle" |
