= Elena Ionescu =

Romanian singer (born 1988)

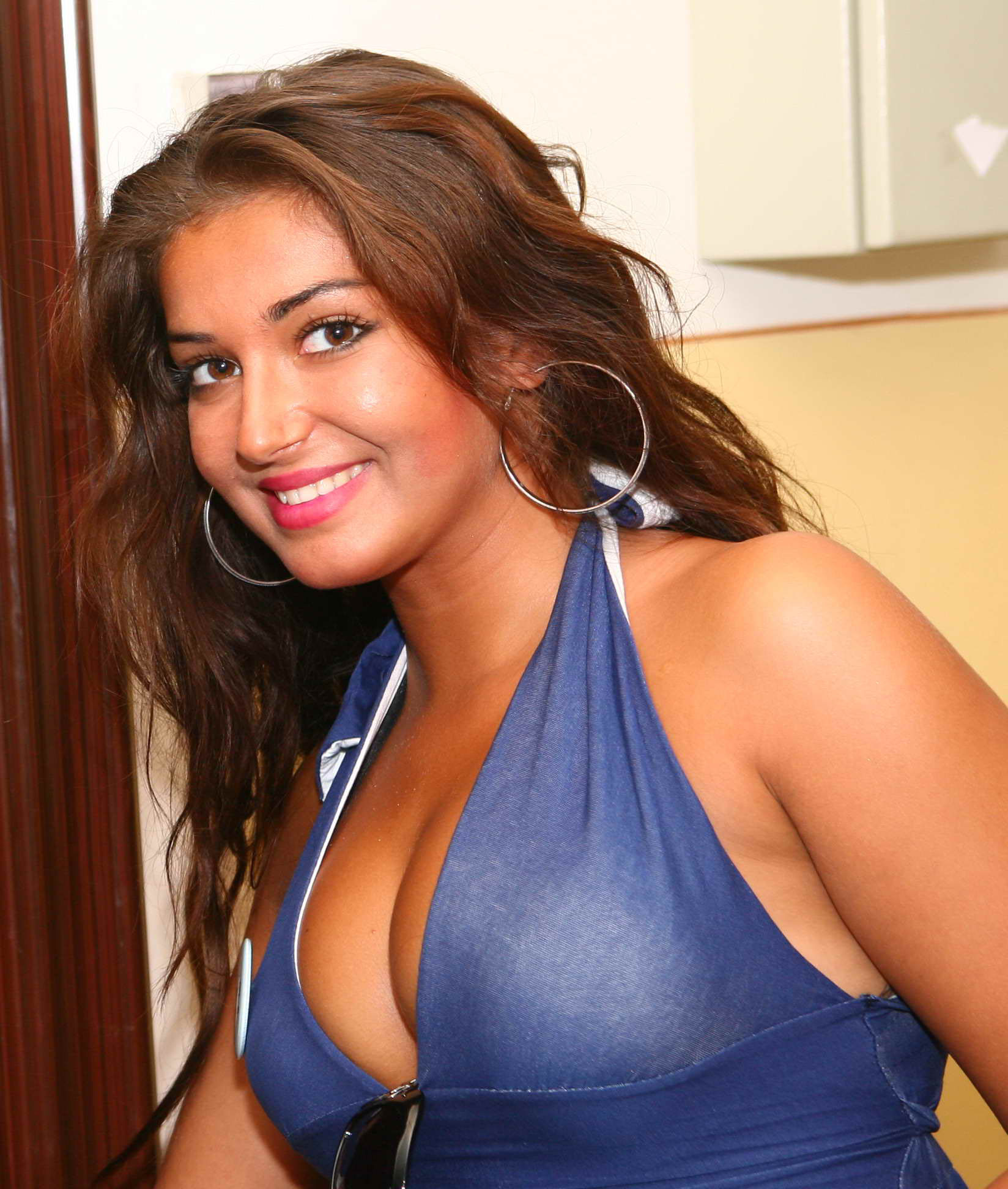
- Elena Ionescu in 2012

Background information
- Also known as: Elena
- Born: Elena Ionescu; 17 May 1988 (age 37)
- Origin: Caracal, Romania
- Genres: Pop, Latino
- Occupation: Singer
- Instrument: Vocals
- Years active: 2006–present

Elena Ionescu (17 May 1988) is a Romanian singer and the first winner of Survivor România.

She was the lead singer of pop band Mandinga from 2006 until 2016, replacing Elena Gheorghe after she left the group to work on her solo career. Ionescu left the group in 2016 to pursue a solo career as well.

Mandinga won the Romanian national selection for the Eurovision Song Contest 2012 in Baku, Azerbaijan, where Ionescu performed the hit song "Zaleilah". Ionescu was the second lead singer of Mandinga to represent Romania in the Eurovision Song Contest, as Elena Gheorghe represented the country in 2009.

== Discography ==
Solo songs
Year	Song
2016	"Decembrie de poveste"
2017	"Spune-i (feat. Mahia Beldo)"
2017	"Laleyla"
2017	"Al 6-lea simt"
2018	"Ce e dragostea?"
2019	"Sube el volumen"
