= Sanda Ladoși =

Romanian singer (born 1970)

Sanda Ladoși (Romanian pronunciation: [ˈsanda ˈladoʃi]; born 2 January 1970) is a Romanian singer. She represented Romania in the Eurovision Song Contest 2004 with the song "I Admit".

== Early life and education ==
Ladoși was born in Târgu Mureș, Romania, into a family of teachers.

As a child, she sang in various choirs and groups. Around the age of ten, she began studying music, learning piano, classical guitar and singing.

Following her family's educational background, she initially pursued studies in education and graduated in Târgu Mureș in 1988. Shortly afterwards, she moved to Bucharest to pursue a music career while studying law at Titu Maiorescu University, graduating in 2001.

== Career ==
Ladoși has performed duets with Romanian artists including Marcel Pavel, Ștefan Iordache, Ioan Gyuri Pascu and Aurelian Temișan. She has released several albums, including Khalini (2006), which features the song "I Admit".

With "I Admit", she won the Romanian national selection for the Eurovision Song Contest 2004, held in Istanbul, where she finished 18th in the final.

Ladoși also provided the Romanian voice of Mulan in the animated series Sofia the First.

== Personal life ==
Ladoși is married to Ștefan Tache and they have two children, a son, Bogdan, born in 2007, and a daughter, Ioana, born in 2009.

In recent years, she has remained active in music and television appearances while also focusing on family life. In 2025, she stated that she was working on new musical projects.

Awards and achievements
| Preceded by Nicoleta Alexandru with "Don't Break My Heart" | Romania in the Eurovision Song Contest; 2004 | Succeeded by Luminița Anghel and Sistem with "Let Me Try" |
