= It's My Life (Cezar song) =

2013 single by Cezar

Single by Cezar
- Released: 2013
- Genre: Operatic pop; dubstep
- Length: 3:00
- Label: TVR
- Songwriter: Cristian Faur
- Producer: Faur

Cezar singles chronology
"Amore" (2010)	"It's My Life" (2013)	"Painful Love" (2013)

Music video
- "It's My Life" on YouTube

Eurovision Song Contest 2013 entry
- Country: Romania
- Artist: Florin Cezar Ouatu
- As: Cezar
- Language: English
- Composer: Cristian Faur
- Lyricist: Faur

Finals performance
- Semi-final result: 5th
- Semi-final points: 83
- Final result: 13th
- Final points: 65

Entry chronology
- ◄ "Zaleilah" (2012)
- "Miracle" (2014) ►

"It's My Life" is a song recorded by Romanian singer Cezar, released as part of a CD single in 2013 through the Romanian Television (TVR). It was solely written and produced by Cristian Faur. Musically, the track has been described as an operatic pop and dubstep song, with the latter genre being predominantly present in the track's bridge. A love song, its instrumentation consists of electronic beats, while Cezar prominently uses his "feminine" falsetto register. Reviewers likened his vocal delivery to the works of Scottish singer Jimmy Somerville and Australian musician Nick Cave.

The song represented Romania in the Eurovision Song Contest 2013 after winning the pre-selection show Selecția Națională. The country reached 13th place in a field of 26, scoring a total of 65 points. Cezar's show featured him dressed in a black sequin cloak standing between fluorescent lighting tubes, while dancers who emerged from a red material placed under him performed interpretive dance. The performance was met with mixed reactions and often featured in publications' lists of Eurovision's most outstanding and peculiar performances. The track itself received similar reviews, with critics arguing over its catchiness, originality, composition and dance nature, as well as over Cezar's vocals.

In order to promote and support "It's My Life", Cezar embarked on a tour in Belgium, Netherlands and the United Kingdom in 2013. An accompanying music video was filmed by Faur in several Romanian locations including the Mamaia resort, Cliceni aerodrome and A2 motorway, and was uploaded to the singer's official YouTube channel on 1 May 2013. TVR also broadcast the visual for the first time on the same date. It portrays Cezar parasailing, driving a Mercedes car and parachuting, as well as residing with model Sarah Ioana Mircea. The track was covered by Macedonian singer Tijana Dapčević and Romanian recording artist Florin Ristei during the Serbian and Romanian versions of interactive reality television franchise series Your Face Sounds Familiar respectively.

== Background and composition ==
"It's My Life" was solely written and produced by Cristian Faur. It was released as a CD single through the Romanian Television (TVR) in 2013, containing a karaoke version alongside the original track. The accompanying cover artwork was photographed by Paula Buciuta, while the package was designed by Bristena de Satmaari. Musically, "It's My Life" has been described as an operatic pop and dubstep song, with the latter genre being pronounced during the track's bridge which uses a sample bought from service Vengeance Audio. Faur referred to the song as an "electro pop opera" number, while Eduard Fernández from El Mundo regarded its genre as "unclassifiable". "It's My Life" is a love song and its instrumentation consists of "angy" electronic beats taken from a "working men's club", as noted by The Times. An editor of the aforementioned publication compared Cezar's prominent use of his falsetto register during the song to Scottish singer Jimmy Somerville and Australian musician Nick Cave; another critic thought he sounded "feminine".

== Critical reception ==
Upon its release, "It's My Life" was met with mixed reactions from music critics. An editor of Tribune Business News wrote that the song had one of the best refrains among Romania's Eurovision entries, while The Daily Edge ranked it fourth in their list of "14 best Eurovision songs in recent years". Fans of the recording include Welsh singer Bonnie Tyler. Reviewers from Wiwibloggs had both positive and negative opinions of "It's My Life", praising Cezar's vocal delivery, as well as the song's catchiness, originality and dance nature, but criticizing its "generic" lyrics, genre crossover, and naming it "excruciating to listen to". Overall, the reviewers on the website gave the song 5.71 out of 10 points. In a 2016 Wiwibloggs poll called "What is your favourite Eurovision song from Romania?", "It's My Life" finished in eighth place with over 300 votes. In a more negative review, Adam Postans of The People satirically called it a "potential sanitary towel advert anthem". Ryan Barrell of Huffington Post criticized the track's use of dubstep elements as "utterly ridiculous".

== Music video and promotion ==
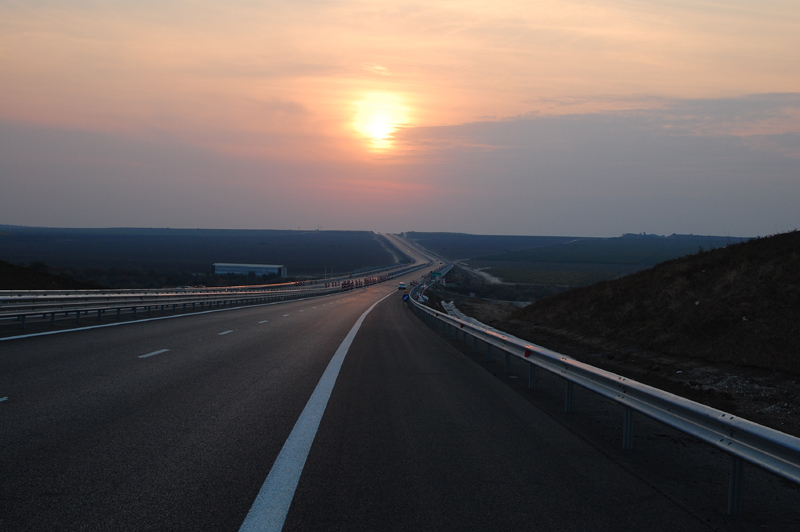
The A2 motorway, on which a part of the song's music video was filmed portraying Cezar driving a Mercedes SL350 car.

An accompanying music video for "It's My Life" was uploaded to Cezar's official YouTube channel on 1 May 2013, and was also exclusively premiered on the same date on TVR's Telejurnal segment. It was filmed by Cristian Faur in Romania at the Mamaia resort, Cliceni aerodrome, city Ploiești and on the A2 motorway. Production was handled by Artside, Cat Music and Radu Hantig, while director of photography Alexandru Prepeliţă and make-up artist Ruxandra Mihaia Caranfil were also hired. Magdalena Ciubotariu and Vlad Tofan were credited for screenplay and direction. The clip's "full of adrenaline" plot presents Cezar parasailing, driving a Mercedes SL350 and parachuting, as well as showing up with model Sarah Ioana Mircea. Regarding the music video, he explained that it was "designed as a 'statement' video, it implies a clear message: 'It's My Life – it's my life, I live it the way I feel!'"

To further promote the song, Cezar embarked on a tour in Netherlands, the United Kingdom and Belgium. In 2017, Macedonian singer Tijana Dapčević sang "It's My Life" and impersonated Cezar on Tvoje lice zvuči poznato, the Serbian version of interactive reality television franchise series Your Face Sounds Familiar. On the Romanian version of the aforementioned series, Te cunosc de undeva!, Romanian recording artist Florin Ristei performed the song in 2014.

== At Eurovision ==
=== National selection ===
Televiziunea Română (TVR) organized the Selecția Națională in order to select its entrant for the Eurovision Song Contest 2013 and opened the submission period for artists' and composers' entries between 14 January and 6 February 2013. The event consisted of two semi-finals on 23 and 24 February respectively, and the final on 9 March 2013. Cezar qualified in second place from the first semi-final behind "Unique" by Luminița Anghel, after the votes of an expert jury panel (ten points) and the televoting (eight points) were combined, resulting in 18 points. Subsequently, "It's My Life" was chosen to represent in Romania in the contest by the same voting system, gathering 20 points in the final, which were composed of eight jury and 12 public points.

=== In Malmö ===
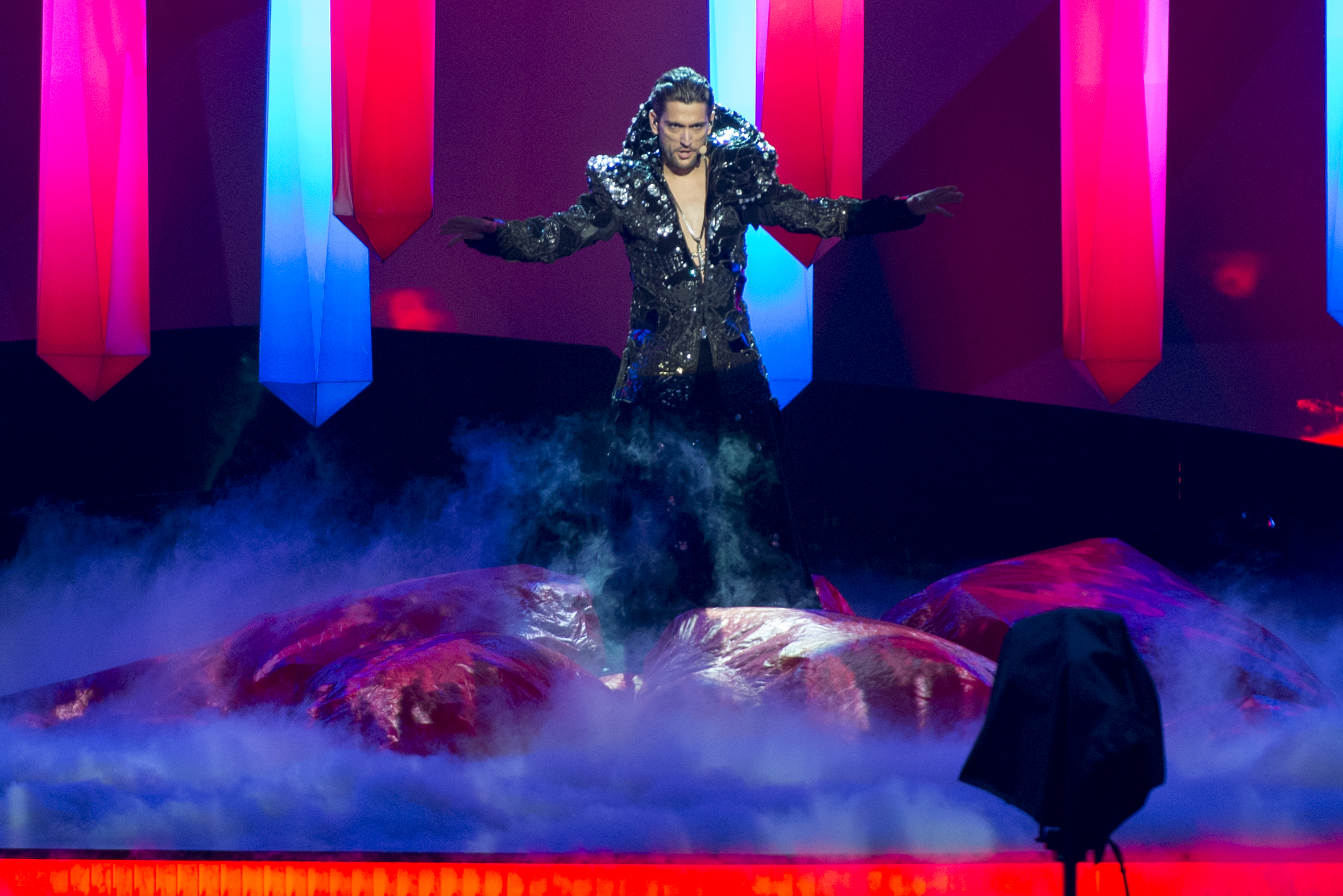
Cezar during a rehearsal for the Eurovision Song Contest 2013. He is placed on red material and stands between fluorescent lighting tubes, wearing a black sequin cloak.

The Eurovision Song Contest 2013 took place at the Malmö Arena in Malmö, Sweden and consisted of two semi-finals on 14 and 16 May, and the final on 18 May 2013. According to the Eurovision rules, all participating countries, except the host country and the "Big Five" (France, Germany, Italy, Spain, and the United Kingdom), were required to qualify from one semi-final to compete for the final; the top ten countries from the respective semi-final progressed to the final. Cezar sang 17th in the second semi-final following Switzerland, while he performed 14th in the Grand Final following Netherlands and preceding the United Kingdom.

Cezar's performance begins with him standing between red and blue fluorescent lighting tubes that are lowered to the stage by a rigging mechanism. He wears a long black sequin cloak and is placed on red material. Behind the singer, the LED screen displays lightning bolts, "emphasising the extreme passion within the song". The color red becomes more pronounced onstage as the show continues, and three semi-naked dancers emerge from the aforementioned material. They perform interpretive dance and wave pieces of the material in front of Cezar. Towards the end of the performance, the singer and the lighting tubes rise 15 ft above the stage, with Cezar singing to a female background dancer wrapped in red material that is now at the same height as him. Pyrotechnics are also used, including flames, fireworks and confetti "lighting up the arena in a big finale".

The performance was received with mixed reviews from critics. An editor of The Times thought it was of a "hysterically camp nature" and likened Cezar's appearance to Flash Gordon character Ming the Merciless (1934). While comparing Cezar to Dracula, Geoff Tibballs, in his book The Good, the Bad and the Wurst: The 100 Craziest Moments from the Eurovision Song Contest, labelled the performance as "gloriously over-the-top". Several publications included Cezar's show in their lists of Eurovision's most outstanding and peculiar performances, including The Calvert Journal, The Irish Post, Cosmopolitan, SheKnows, The Reykjavík Grapevine, MTV UK, and the Huffington Post.

==== Points awarded to Romania ====
Below is a breakdown of points awarded to Romania in the second semi-final and Grand Final of the contest. On the first occasion, the country finished in fifth place with a total of 83 points, including ten from Malta, Iceland, Israel and Greece, eight from Azerbaijan, and seven from Germany. In the Grand Final of the Eurovision Song Contest, Romania finished in 13th position, gathering a total of 65 points, including ten awarded by Moldova and Greece, seven by Malta and six by Norway, Iceland and Azerbaijan.

Points awarded to Romania (Semi-Final 2)
12 points	10 points	8 points	7 points	6 points
	Greece; Iceland; Israel; Malta	Azerbaijan	Germany	France; Norway
5 points	4 points	3 points	2 points	1 point
Albania	Finland	Armenia	Bulgaria	Macedonia; Spain

Points awarded to Romania (Final)
12 points	10 points	8 points	7 points	6 points
	Greece; Moldova		Malta	Azerbaijan; Iceland; Norway
5 points	4 points	3 points	2 points	1 point
Albania	Austria; Sweden; United Kingdom			France; Italy; Montenegro

== Track listing ==
- Romanian CD single
1. "It's My Life" – 3:00
2. "It's My Life (Karaoke Version)" – 3:00

== Release history ==
Country	Date	Format	Label	Ref.
Romania	2013	CD single	TVR	
