= Israel in the Eurovision Song Contest 2012 =

- Eurovision Song Contest 2012
- Country: Israel
- Selection process: Internal selection
- Announcement date: Artist: 7 February 2012; Song: 1 March 2012

Competing entry
- Song: "Time"
- Artist: Izabo
- Songwriters: Ran Shem-Tov; Shiri Hadar

Placement
- Semi-final result: Failed to qualify (13th)

Participation chronology

Israel was represented at the Eurovision Song Contest 2012 with the song "Time" written by Ran Shem-Tov and Shiri Hadar. The song was performed by the band Izabo, which was internally selected by the Israeli broadcaster Israel Broadcasting Authority (IBA) to compete at the 2012 contest in Baku, Azerbaijan. Izabo and the song "Time" were announced as the Israeli entry on 7 February 2012. The song was presented to the public on 1 March 2012.

Israel was drawn to compete in the first semi-final of the Eurovision Song Contest which took place on 22 May 2012. Performing during the show in position 10, "Time" was not announced among the top 10 entries of the first semi-final and therefore did not qualify to compete in the final. It was later revealed that Israel placed thirteenth out of the 18 participating countries in the semi-final with 33 points.

== Background ==
Prior to the 2012 contest, Israel had participated in the Eurovision Song Contest thirty-four times since its first entry in 1973. Israel has won the contest on three occasions: in 1978 with the song "A-Ba-Ni-Bi" performed by Izhar Cohen and the Alphabeta, in 1979 with the song "Hallelujah" performed by Milk and Honey and in 1998 with the song "Diva" performed by Dana International. Since the introduction of semi-finals to the format of the Eurovision Song Contest in 2004, Israel has, to this point, managed to qualify to the final six times, including three top ten results in 2005 with Shiri Maimon and "HaSheket SheNish'ar" placing fourth, and in 2008 with Boaz and "The Fire in Your Eyes" placing ninth. Israel had qualified to the final for three consecutive years between 2008 and 2010 prior to their non-qualification in 2011 with the song "Ding Dong" performed by Dana International.

The Israeli national broadcaster, Israel Broadcasting Authority (IBA) had been in charge of the nation's participation in the contest since its debut in 1973. IBA confirmed Israel's participation in the contest on 7 August 2011 despite previous rumours of a withdrawal due to difficulties of Azerbaijan's open border with Iran, as well as the date of the final, 26 May 2016, coinciding with the Shavuot holiday. IBA had planned to organise a national final under a new format in January or February 2012, but was later cancelled due to scheduling problems and an internal selection was instead conducted to select the Israeli entry for 2012.

== Before Eurovision ==
=== Internal selection ===
On 7 February 2012, IBA announced that the band Izabo was selected as the Israeli representative for the Eurovision Song Contest 2012 with the song "Time". A special committee consisting of music industry professionals and members from IBA and OGAE Israel considered songs received from an additional four artists: Chen Aharoni, Maya Bouskilla, Svika Pick and Vladi Bleyberg, before Izabo was ultimately selected. Cabra Casay, Karolina and Red Band were also invited by IBA to submit a song but turned down the offer. The members of the committee were Yaakov Naveh (ACUM representative), Nimrod Lev (musician), Mira Awad (2009 Israeli Eurovision entrant), Gilad Segev (singer), Roi Yechezkel (president of OGAE Israel), Izchak Sonnenschein (Head of Israeli Eurovision delegation), Rina Hachmon (Channel 1 Head of television), Tal Argaman (Channel 1 entertainment and culture producer), Roni Yedidia (musician) and Ofer Nachshon (Channel 1 presenter).

"Time", written by band members Ran Shem-Tov and Shiri Hadar, was a song in a bilingual mix of English and Hebrew. The song was presented on 1 March 2012 online via IBA's official Eurovision Song Contest website Eurovil, while the official music video was released to the public on 9 March 2012 during the IBA evening news broadcast.

== At Eurovision ==
According to Eurovision rules, all nations with the exceptions of the host country and the "Big Five" (France, Germany, Italy, Spain and the United Kingdom) are required to qualify from one of two semi-finals in order to compete for the final; the top ten countries from each semi-final progress to the final. The European Broadcasting Union (EBU) split up the competing countries into six different pots based on voting patterns from previous contests, with countries with favourable voting histories put into the same pot. On 25 January 2012, a special allocation draw was held which placed each country into one of the two semi-finals. During the allocation draw, it was determined that Israel would perform in the first semi-final, to be held on 22 May 2012. The running order for the semi-finals was decided through another draw on 20 March 2012 and Israel was set to perform in position 10, following the entry from Finland and before the entry from San Marino.

In Israel, the two semi-finals and the final were televised live on IBA. The Israeli spokesperson, who announced the Israeli votes during the final, was Ofer Nachshon.

=== Semi-final ===
Izabo took part in technical rehearsals on 14 and 17 May, followed by dress rehearsals on 21 and 22 May. This included the jury show on 21 May where the professional juries of each country watched and voted on the competing entries.

The Israeli performance featured the members Izabo performing in a band set-up together with two backing vocalists, one male and one female, who embraced and kissed each other at the end of the performance. The LED screens displayed a rotating clock inscribed with the song title "Time" in the center, surrounded by small stop watches against images of large cog wheels. The performance also featured pyrotechnic effects and shooting flames.

At the end of the show, Israel was not announced among the top 10 entries in the first semi-final and therefore failed to qualify to compete in the final. It was later revealed that Israel placed thirteenth in the semi-final, receiving a total of 33 points.

=== Voting ===
Voting during the three shows involved each country awarding points from 1–8, 10 and 12 as determined by a combination of 50% national jury and 50% televoting. Each nation's jury consisted of five music industry professionals who are citizens of the country they represent. This jury judged each entry based on: vocal capacity; the stage performance; the song's composition and originality; and the overall impression by the act. In addition, no member of a national jury was permitted to be related in any way to any of the competing acts in such a way that they cannot vote impartially and independently.

Below is a breakdown of points awarded to Israel and awarded by Israel in the second semi-final and grand final of the contest. The nation awarded its 12 points to Russia in the semi-final and to Sweden in the final of the contest.

==== Points awarded to Israel ====
Points awarded to Israel (Semi-final 1)
Score	Country
12 points	
10 points	
8 points	
7 points	Austria
6 points	Russia
5 points	Hungary; Romania
4 points	
3 points	Denmark; Finland
2 points	Spain
1 point	Cyprus; Latvia

==== Points awarded by Israel ====
Points awarded by Israel (Semi-final 1)
Score	Country
12 points	Russia
10 points	Cyprus
8 points	Romania
7 points	Ireland
6 points	Moldova
5 points	Albania
4 points	Iceland
3 points	Greece
2 points	Finland
1 point	Switzerland

Points awarded by Israel (Final)
Score	Country
12 points	Sweden
10 points	Spain
8 points	Azerbaijan
7 points	Russia
6 points	Romania
5 points	Moldova
4 points	Italy
3 points	Cyprus
2 points	Greece
1 point	Turkey
