= I Admit (Sanda song) =

2004 single by Sanda Ladoși

Single by Sanda

from the album Khalini
- Released: 2004
- Genre: Dance-pop
- Length: 3:00
- Label: TVR
- Songwriter(s): Irina Gligor
- Producer(s): George Popa

Eurovision Song Contest 2004 entry
- Country: Romania
- Artist(s): Sanda Ladoși
- As: Sanda
- Language: English
- Composer(s): George Popa
- Lyricist(s): Irina Gligor

Finals performance
- Final result: 18th
- Final points: 18

Entry chronology
- ◄ "Don't Break My Heart" (2003)
- "Let Me Try" (2005) ►

"I Admit" is a song recorded by Romanian singer Sanda for her fifth studio album Khalini (2006). It was recorded at the Studioul Adi Ordean and was released as a CD single in 2004 by Romanian Television (TVR). A dance-pop track with Latin beats in its instrumentation, "I Admit" was written by Irina Gligor and produced by George Popa.

The track represented Romania in the Eurovision Song Contest 2004 in Istanbul, Turkey after winning the pre-selection show Selecția Națională. Sanda's victory was widely contested by observers. In Istanbul, Romania automatically qualified to the final due to their top 11 placement in the previous edition and finished in 18th place with 18 points. Sanda's show contained sexual elements, with her wearing what a reviewer described as a vampire-inspired look consisting of a dress similar to those worn by Cher. Commercially, "I Admit" failed to impact any national chart.

== Background and composition ==
"I Admit" was written by Irina Gligor, while production was handled by George Popa. It was recorded and mixed at Studioul Adi Ordean by George Nemeznic and Popa, respectively. A CD single of "I Admit" was released in Romania in 2004 by Romanian Television (TVR) in Romania, containing the "Full Vocal Mix" version of the track, lasting three minutes. Musically, "I Admit" is a dance-pop song with Latin beats in its instrumentation.

== At Eurovision ==
=== National selection ===
On 13 March 2004, the final of the Selecția Națională was held in order to select the Romanian entrant for the Eurovision Song Contest 2004, preceded by two semi-finals on 28 February and 6 March 2004, respectively. "I Admit" progressed first from the first semi-final and was subsequently chosen to represent Romania in the contest after the votes of an expert jury panel (12 points) and televoting results (12 points) were combined, resulting in 24 points. Sanda's win was widely contested by several observers including fellow Selecția Națională participant Elena Cârstea.

=== In Istanbul ===
The Eurovision Song Contest 2004 took place at the Abdi İpekçi Arena in Istanbul, Turkey and consisted of one semi-final on 12 May, and the final on 15 May 2004. According to the then-Eurovision rules, selected countries, except the host nation and the "Big Four" (France, Germany, Spain and the United Kingdom), were required to qualify from the semi-final to compete for the final; the top ten countries from the semi-final progressed to the final. As she automatically qualified for the final due to Romania's top 11 placement the previous year, Sanda performed 23rd on the occasion, preceded by Turkey and followed by Sweden. During her show, she wore what an editor from German website Prinz.de described as a vampire-inspired look consisting of a dress similar to those sported by American singer Cher. The author further noted that Sanda's performance was Romania's first to contain sexual elements. Janina Funk, writing for Augsburger Allgemeine criticised Sanda's vocal delivery and accent. Romania eventually came in 18th position with 18 points, consisting of ten awarded by Spain, four by Portugal, three by Cyprus and one by Israel. The Romanian televote awarded its 12 points to Greece in both the semi-final and the final.

== Track listing ==
- Romanian CD single
1. "I Admit" (Full Vocal Mix) – 3:00

== Credits and personnel ==
Credits adapted from the liner notes of the CD single.

Management

- Published by Romanian Television (TVR)
- Recorded and mixed at Studioul Adi Ordean

Personnel

- Sanda Ladoși – lead vocals
- Irina Gligor – composer
- George Popa – producer

== Release history ==
| Country | Date | Format | Label |
|---|---|---|---|
| Romania | N/A 2004 | CD single | TVR |
