= Luminița Anghel =

Romanian singer (born 1968)

- Promotional shot of Anghel in Kyiv (2005).

Background information
- Born: Luminița Anghel; 7 October 1968 (age 57); Bucharest, Romania
- Origin: Bucharest, Romania
- Genres: Pop
- Occupations: Singer; songwriter; TV personality; politician
- Instrument: Vocals
- Years active: 1976–present
- Labels: Big Man; Cat; Ovo; Roton

Luminița Anghel (Romanian pronunciation: [lumiˈnitsa ˈaŋɡel]; born 7 October 1968) is a Romanian singer, TV personality and politician. She is internationally known for representing Romania at the Eurovision Song Contest 2005 along with percussion band Sistem. Their song, "Let Me Try", reached the third place in the final after placing first in the semi-finals; their appearance marks the country's best result in the contest along with 2010's "Playing with Fire" performed by Paula Seling and Ovi and 2026's "Choke Me" performed by Alexandra Căpitănescu.

Anghel particularly experienced success in her native country with follow-up recordings, resulting her receiving an offer from Walt Disney Pictures to provide vocals for Tangled's Mother Gothel in 2010. The singer won numerous awards, including distinctions from Bulgaria and Malta.

== Early life and early career ==
Luminița Anghel was born on 7 October 1968 in Bucharest, Romania. She is a graduate of the Popular Art School, where she attended the vocal-light music section and the Faculty of Sociology and Psychology within the university Spiru Haret. She loved performing during childhood, having performed from the age of 8. Since then, her artistic career has gone from strength to strength. These days, Anghel is a very popular and appreciated artist, and has been awarded with numerous prizes, both in domestic and international song contests. As a teenager, she began working with Ensemble "Doina". Along with this assembly she had a series of tournaments in her native country and abroad.

Anghel became known in Romania in 1993, when she won the first prize and the trophy at the Mamaia Music Festival, and 1995 she won the third prize at the same contest. Also in 1995, she starred in the film Captain Conan, directed by Bertrard Tavernier. In 2001, she won the first prize for the best performance, and the popularity-price at the International Festival The Golden Stag in Romania. One year later she came first at the Maltese Festival Song For Europe. Anghel was there awarded with the first prize and the trophy for the best international voice. Another trophies came for her few months later at the International festival Discovery, in Bulgaria, and the Universetalent. In 2003, she won the first prize for the best international performance at the International Festival Voice of Asia, the second prize at the International Creation Festival in Cairo 2003, with her own and first song I Ask You Why. Luminița is also a well-known and appreciated TV host for different programmes (mostly) on public television. She was a host at the channels TVR1, TVR2, TVRi and Antena 1.

From 2002 to 2009, she was a private party planner for events at ENTERTAINMENT INTL S.R.L. In 2008, she was chosen to be the face of Garnier in Romania for skin care. The claim was later denied by the Romanian CNA, as politicians who campaign for something cannot appear on television.

Her single "Love Will Come" peaked at number 5 in Romania.

== Awards and nominations ==
Year	Award	Category	Nominee	Result
1993	Mamaia Music Festival	Best Performer	Luminița Anghel	1st place
1994	Selecția Națională	Final	Nu e prea târziu	Qualified
1994	Selecția Națională	Final	Speranţă	Qualified
1995	Mamaia Music Festival	Best Performer	Luminița Anghel	3rd Place
1996	Selecția Națională	Final	Încotro soartă	6th place
2000	Selecția Națională	Final	M-ai înșelat	6th place
2001	Golden Stag Festival	Best Interpret	Luminița Anghel	1st place
2001	Golden Stag Festival	Fan's special prize	Luminița Anghel	Won
2002	The Best Voice in the Universtalent Festival	Jury's special prize	Luminița Anghel	Won
2002	The Best Voice in the Universtalent Festival	Best Performer	Luminița Anghel	3rd Place
2002	Descovery	Best International Voice	Luminița Anghel	1st place
2002	Song For Europe	Best International Voice	Luminița Anghel	1st place
2003	Creation Festival	Best International Interpret	Luminița Anghel	2nd place
2003	Voice of Asia	Best International Interpret	Luminița Anghel	1st place
2005	Selecția Națională	Final	Let Me Try	1st place
2005	Eurovision Song Contest 2005	Semi-Final	Let Me Try	1st Place (Qualified)
2005	Eurovision Song Contest 2005	Final	Let Me Try	3rd Place
2010	Selecția Națională	Final	Save Their Lives	2nd place
2013	Selecția Națională	Final	Unique	3rd Place
2015	Selecția Națională	Final	A Million Stars	2nd place

== Filmography ==
=== Television ===
Year	Title	Role	Channel	Notes
1998	Music Charts	VJ	Prima TV	
1999–present	Care pe Care	TV host	TVR 1	
2002	Pretul succesului (The price of success)	TV moderator	TVR 2	
2002	Ofertă specială (Special offer)	TV host	TVRi	
2003–present	Start în viață (Start in life)	TV host	TVRi	
2005–present	Ești femeia perfecta? (Are you the perfect woman)	TV host	TVRi	
2005	Secretul Mariei (Maria's secret)	Eli		10 episodes
2005	Piata Divertis (The Divertis-market)	Herself	TVRi	sung Let Me Try, 1 episode
2005	Trasniti in NATO (Crazy people in NATO)	Herself	TVRi	1 episode
2006	Da-i papucii (Leave him)	TV host	Antena 1	
2014	X Factor	Herself	Antena 1	duet with Mădălina Lefter

=== Film ===
Year	Title	Role	Channel
1996	Capitanul Conan (Captain Conan)	cameo	TVR
2010	Tangled	Mama Gothel (voice)	Disney Channel

- A Poem is... - Narrator - The Mother Song (Romanian version) from Disney Junior block program

== Personal life ==
Anghel was in a long-term relationship with former footballer and sports executive Marcel Pușcaș, with whom she adopted a son, David Pușcaș.

Anghel married her partner, Silviu Dumitriade, in a private civil ceremony held on the beach in Mangalia, Romania, in October 2011. The couple later held an Eastern Orthodox religious wedding ceremony in Spain on 20 March 2012.

Anghel and Dumitriade have a son, Filip, born in 2011.

In the 2020s, Anghel publicly discussed difficulties in her relationship with her adopted son David, stating that they had become estranged after years of family conflict.

== Eurovision Song Contest ==
Luminița Anghel, along with Tony Tomas and Adrian Piper participated in Selecția Națională 2010 on 6 March 2010. They presented their song "Save Their Lives" in a bid to represent Romania at the 2010 Eurovision Song Contest. In 2013, Anghel attempted to represent Romania, entering Selecția Națională with the song "Unique." Her song placed third overall.

== Political career ==
At the 2008 Romanian legislative election, she was a Social Democratic candidate for a Bucharest seat in the Chamber of Deputies; she lost to Elena Udrea.

"I realize that the life of a politician is not as simple as it looks on TV and in the press. Many scurry need information, heated discussions, sleepless nights, meetings with people, to always be attentive to what is happening around you. I want to be seen as a human, and not as an artist or politician. I don't entered politics to become a star. I am one. I also don't entered politics because I want more money. I already have enough to live a decent life together with my family. I even don't entered politics to ensure "a warm place". I don't chose randomly PSD. I want to get involved. I chose PSD, because that's a big and strong party, which is based on principles of equality and social justice, fighting for a system of social protection, and because I hope to keep a promise, to support me in my projects. Elena Udrea is not my rival. I have my own campaign. When the contracandidat is stronger, you harder wanna win."

== Discography ==
=== Albums ===
Title	Albums details	Release date
Șansa e de partea mea	Label: Roton; Formats: CD, digital download; Genres: Pop	1998
Promisiuni	Label: Cat Music; Formats: CD, digital download; Genres: Pop	March 3, 2001

=== Singles ===
List of singles, with selected chart positions
Title	Year	Peak chart positions	Album
Title	Year	ROM	Album
"Let Me Try" (with Sistem)	2005	9	Non-album singles
"Love Will Come"	2005	5	Non-album singles
"My Everything"	2006	—	Non-album singles
"I Ask You Why"	2010	—	Non-album singles
"Save Their Lives"	2010	—	Non-album singles
"You Took My Soul"	2010	—	Non-album singles
"Unique"	2013	—	Non-album singles
"A Million Stars"	2015	—	Non-album singles
"—" denotes a title that did not chart, or was not released in that territory.

Preceded by Sanda Ladoși with "I Admit"	Romania in the Eurovision Song Contest; 2005	Succeeded by Mihai Trăistariu with "Tornerò"
