= Playing with Fire (Paula Seling and Ovi song) =

2010 single by Paula Seling and Ovi

- One of the various cover artworks used to commercialize "Playing with Fire"

Single by Paula Seling and Ovi

from the album Playing with Fire
- Released: 2010
- Length: 3:00
- Label: TVR; TMC; AXR
- Songwriter: Ovidiu Cernăuțeanu
- Producer: Simen M. Eriksrud

Paula Seling singles chronology
"Believe" (2009)	"Playing with Fire" (2010)	"Counting Down" (2011)

Ovi singles chronology
"Saying Goodnight" (2009)	"Playing with Fire" (2010)	"Counting Down" (2011)

Audio sample
- file; help

Eurovision Song Contest 2010 entry
- Country: Romania
- Artists: Paula Seling and Ovidiu Cernăuțeanu
- As: Paula Seling and Ovi
- Languages: English
- Composer: Simen M. Eriksrud
- Lyricist: Ovidiu Cernăuțeanu

Finals performance
- Semi-final result: 4th
- Semi-final points: 104
- Final result: 3rd
- Final points: 162

Entry chronology
- ◄ "The Balkan Girls" (2009)
- "Change" (2011) ►

"Playing with Fire" is a song recorded by Romanian singer Paula Seling and Romanian-Norwegian performer Ovidiu Cernăuțeanu for their 2010 collaborative album of the same name. It was released as a CD single in 2010 by TVR, TMC and AXR labels. Partly influenced by opera music, the track was written by Ovi and produced by Simen M. Eriksrud. The lyrics of "Playing with Fire" portray a fight between a male and a female, with a reviewer speculating that it revolved around arson.

The track represented Romania in the Eurovision Song Contest 2010 after winning the pre-selection show Selecția Națională. Seling and Ovi's win sparked controversy after it was speculated that Eriksrud was one of the writers of "Playing with Fire", which was not permitted by the rules of the national selection as he is not of Romanian origin. The accusations were denied and it was later confirmed that Eriksrud only produced the track. In Oslo, the singers qualified for the Grand Final, where they finished third with 162 points. This remains Romania's best result in the contest alongside 2005's "Let Me Try" by Luminița Anghel and Sistem. Onstage, Seling and Ovi played a double piano wearing a black catsuit and black clothing, respectively, accompanied by four background vocalists.

Music critics gave positive reviews of the song, and it was named one of the contest's highlights. "Playing with Fire" also won an award in the Pop Song of the Year category at the 2011 Radio România Actualități Awards. Commercially, the track charted within the top 30 in Norway and Sweden after the contest. Its promotion consisted of various live performances and endeavours, as well as the release of an accompanying music video on 6 April 2010 on YouTube. Filmed in Romania and Austria, it was shot by Mihnea De Vries and executive produced by Eduard Schneider. The visual portrays Seling and Ovi fighting in a video game theme, embodying several characters, and is the first usage of the motion capture technique in Romania. Over the years, "Playing with Fire" was covered by singers such as Ilinca Băcilă and Alex Florea.

== Background and release ==
"Playing with Fire" was produced by Norwegian record producer Simen M. Eriksrud, while lyrics were written by Romanian singer and songwriter Ovidiu Cernăuțeanu. The latter met singer Paula Seling at a native song festival, where they decided to team up and create a song to submit for the Eurovision Song Contest. This resulted in "Playing with Fire", whose lyrics revolve around a fight between a male and a female, which was also used as the concept for the song's accompanying music video.

The partly opera-influenced track contains a rhyme between the words 'fire' and 'desire', with an editor of The Guardian speculating that "Playing with Fire" discussed on arson, a crime of intentionally, deliberately and maliciously setting fire to buildings or other properties with the intent to cause damage. The recording was solely released as an enhanced CD and CD single throughout 2010 by TVR, TMC and AXR labels. In February 2010, a contest was launched to find the best remix of "Playing with Fire", with the winner's work to be promoted by Da Works Records and Warner Music Group in Europe. The stems of the song were also made available through the iTunes Store under the title "Playing With Fire (Make Your Own Remix Kit)".

== Reception and accolades ==
"Playing with Fire" received positive reviews from music critics. While Daily Mirror's Carl Greenwood called the song "frankly brilliant", Frances Robinson from International Business Times included it in her all-time Eurovision favorites. Journalists brought together by Spanish website La Información mentioned "Playing with Fire" in their list of the best entries in the Eurovision Song Contest 2010. Editor Carlos Otero called the song "an ideal blend between innovation and Eurovision-ish rhythm", and compared Seling's image to that of American television sitcom Saved by the Bell character Kelly Kapowski. Another critic, Popy Blasco, likened the artists to a "pop and shiny version" of Argentine duo Pimpinela. In a 2016 poll on Wiwibloggs called "What is your favourite Eurovision song from Romania?", "Playing with Fire" finished in first place with over 1,000 votes. The song won an award in the Pop Song of the Year section at the 2011 Radio România Actualități Awards.

== Music video ==
=== Background and production ===
Prior to Seling and Ovi being selected as Romania's entrants for the contest, a promotional music video was filmed and released online. The song's official music video was subsequently uploaded onto Eurovision Song Contest's official YouTube channel on 6 April 2010. Beginning on 18 March 2010, it was filmed by Mihnea De Vries and executive produced by Eduard Schneider from Schneider Productions România, alongside further co-production by the Romanian Television (TVR) and Romanian newspaper Adevărul. Special effects were edited by specialists from multiple European countries, who were assisted by Cristian "Freespace" Ciocotisan. The lyrics of "Playing with Fire" were used as the visual's concept — which is set in the future — with Schneider stating that he wanted to showcase an antithesis between classic and futuristic elements.

Odiviu "Uwe" and Darius Macinic were hired as stunts, with their scenes filmed in Alba Iulia and Sebeș, Romania with the assistance of ten people. The background dancers for the music video were Bianca Racolţa and Andrei Ionuţi, whose parts were shot at the Schloss Grafenegg near Vienna, Austria in two days. Both wore sensor costumes similar to those presented in Avatar (2009). Multiple fight scenes were filmed in the same location, although some of them were scrapped to not give the music video a negative fight character. The scrapped scenes were to be published in the form of pictures after the release of the music video. Scenes focusing mainly on Seling and Ovi were shot in the span of one day at a café in a mall in Alba Iulia, which was arranged to look futuristic. The two were also required to learn a few dance moves from a Ukrainian instructor. Filmed and edited in ten hours, other locations for the clip's shooting were a building of a factory in ruins and Schneider's studio in Alba Iulia. The music video was the first use of the motion capture technique in Romania, as confirmed by Adevărul.

=== Synopsis and reception ===
The clip starts with Seling sitting on a couch, reading an Adevărul issue on what appears to be a tablet. Ovi, appearing in the room, throws himself "bored" on a couch while Seling takes a cup of coffee in her hands. The way Ovi falls on the couch makes the latter spill her coffee on her dress, followed by both fighting by lip synching to the lyrics of the track. The rest of the music video is set in a video game theme, with Seling and Ovi fighting against each other and embodying several characters such as pilots, urban guerrillas, dancers and robots. The clip ends with Seling staring at the camera, having red irises. Interspersed scenes during the music video's main plot show the artists playing a glass piano, which Seling eventually breaks when hitting a high note. In another scene, both wear a glove with LED lights, created specifically for the clip. The music video was positively received by fans, gathering over 72,000 views in three days of its release and various positive comments.

== At Eurovision ==
=== National selection ===
On 6 March 2010, the Selecția Națională was held in order to select the Romanian entrant for the Eurovision Song Contest. Subsequently, "Playing with Fire" was chosen to represent Romania at the contest after the votes of regional jury panels (12 points) and public televoting (12 points) were combined, resulting in 24 points. Seling accidentally broke the trophy after falling off her hands, which was the subject of irony of an article written by an editor of Ele.ro. Seling and Ovi's win was contested by Romanian singer Luminița Anghel — who had already represented Romania in the Eurovision Song Contest 2005 — although she was in turn criticized for causing the death of several butterflies during the show for her entry "Save Their Lives" with Tony Tomas and Adrian Piper. Later in March, it was speculated that Eriksrud – who is not of Romanian origin or citizenship – was one of the writers of "Playing with Fire" along with Ovi, which was not permitted by the rules of the Selecția Națională and would have led to the song's disqualification from the contest. However, the latter soon after denied the accusations, confirming that Eriksrud only produced the track and was given half of its copyrights by him after it was registered at Norwegian copyright corporation TONO.

=== In Oslo ===
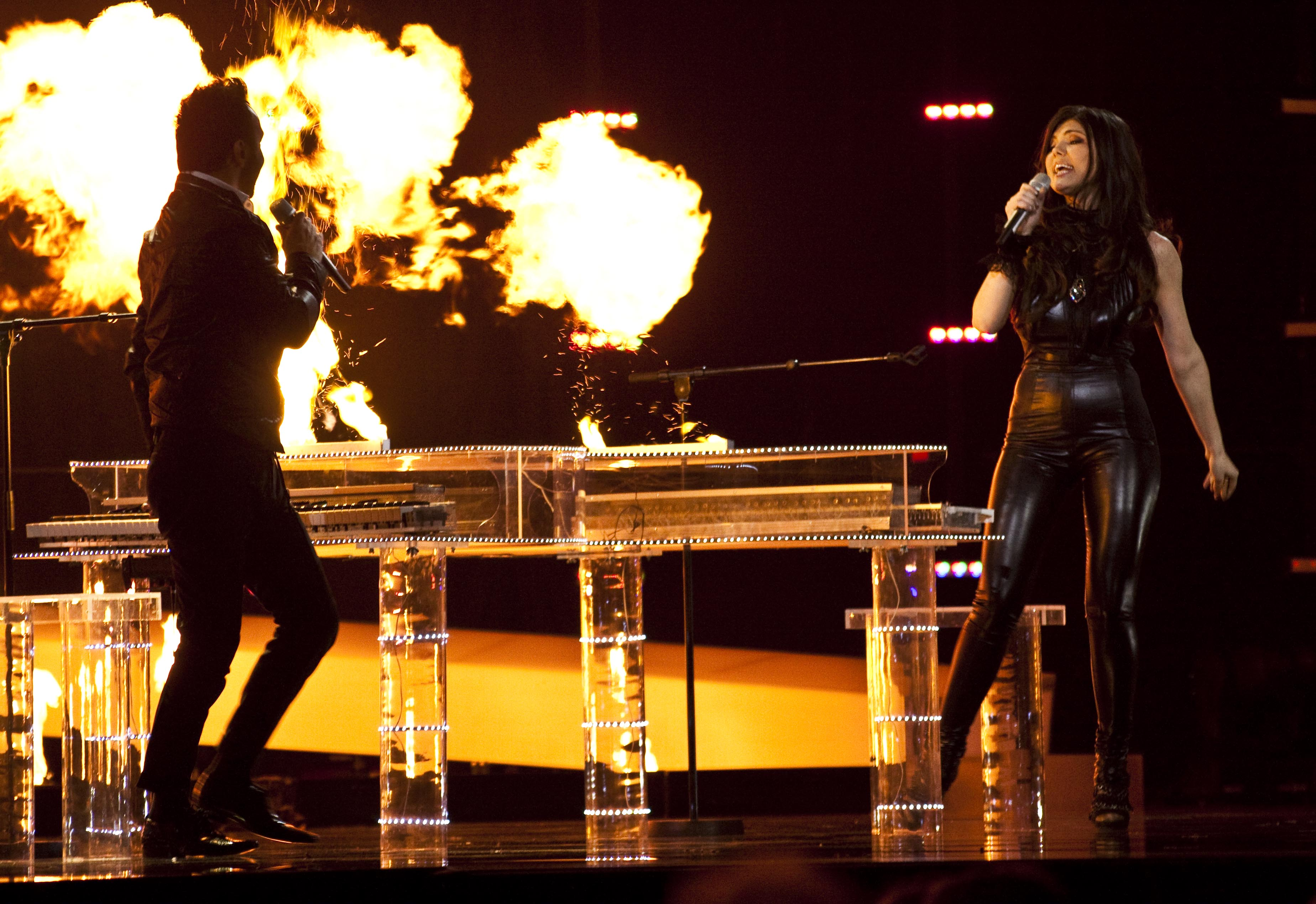
Ovi and Seling performing "Playing with Fire" during the second semi-final of the contest, playing a double piano. The latter wears a black catsuit.

The Eurovision Song Contest 2010 took place at the Telenor Arena in Oslo, Norway and consisted of two semi-finals on 25 and 27 May, respectively, and the final on 29 May 2010. According to the Eurovision rules, all participating countries, except the host country and the "Big Four" (France, Germany, Spain and the United Kingdom), were required to qualify from one semi-final to compete for the final; the top ten countries from the respective semi-final progressed to the final. Seling and Ovi performed tenth in the second semi-final, preceded by the Netherlands and followed by Slovenia, while they sang 19th in the Grand Final, preceded by France and followed by Russia.

The artists' show begins with them performing the song sitting on both sides of a "shine-through" double piano made by Seling's husband, enhanced by "white-glimmering" LED lights. Following this, Seling and Ovi – dressed in a black catsuit and black clothes, respectively – leave the piano and move to the front part of the stage, aided by four background vocalists (Andreea Moldovan, Larisa Borza, Andrada Janette Suliman and Elena Bianca Purcărea) placed on the left half of the stage. Further technical enhancements include the lights on the backdrop changing from blue to orange with the words 'boy' and 'girl', as well as fire being displayed on the background and piano. Claire-Marie Allègre of French website L'Express Styles positively called Seling's catsuit extravagant. In his book Waltz of the Asparagus People: The Further Adventures of Piano Girl, Robin Meloy Goldsby praised the artists' show and their vocal delivery, and called the piano Las Vegas-inspired. He further wrote: "Seling looked nasty, in a good way. Ovi did his best to keep up with her, but he could have used a few macho lessons [...]".

==== Points awarded to Romania ====
Below is a breakdown of points awarded to Romania in the second semi-final and Grand Final of the contest. On the first occasion, the country finished in fourth place with a total of 104 points, including 12 from the United Kingdom, ten from Norway, and eight from Cyprus, Denmark, Israel and Turkey. In the Grand Final of the Eurovision Song Contest, Romania finished in third position, gathering a total of 162 points, including 12 awarded by Moldova, ten by Norway, Portugal, Spain and Sweden, and eight by Cyprus, Denmark, Israel and the United Kingdom. This remains the country's best result in the contest, alongside 2005's "Let Me Try" by Luminița Anghel and Sistem.

Points awarded to Romania (Semi-final 2)
Score	Country
12 points	United Kingdom
10 points	Norway
8 points	Cyprus; Denmark; Israel; Turkey
7 points	Sweden
6 points	Ireland; Lithuania
5 points	Azerbaijan
4 points	Armenia; Bulgaria; Georgia; Slovenia; Switzerland
3 points	Netherlands; Ukraine
2 points	
1 point	

Points awarded to Romania (Final)
Score	Country
12 points	Moldova
10 points	Norway; Portugal; Spain; Sweden
8 points	Cyprus; Denmark; Israel; United Kingdom
7 points	Azerbaijan; Ireland; Slovenia
6 points	Poland; Serbia
5 points	Albania; Iceland; Malta; Netherlands
4 points	Greece; Switzerland
3 points	Latvia; Russia
2 points	Bosnia and Herzegovina; Lithuania; Turkey; Ukraine
1 point	Armenia; Belarus; Slovakia

== Track listing ==
- Romanian CD single
1. "Playing with Fire" – 3:00
2. "Playing with Fire" (Official Remix) – 4:51
3. "Playing with Fire" (Karaoke/Instrumental) – 3:00
4. "Playing with Fire" (Music video) – 3:05
- Swedish CD single
1. "Playing with Fire" (Radio Original Version) – 3:03
2. "Playing with Fire" (Fly DJ's Remix) – 4:55
- Finnish CD single
1. "Playing with Fire" (Radio Original Version) – 3:04
2. "Playing with Fire" (Fly DJ's Remix) – 4:57
3. "Playing with Fire" (Regular Singback) – 3:07
4. "Playing with Fire" (Instrumental Eurovision Singback) – 3:05

== Charts ==
Chart (2010)	Peak position
Belgium (Ultratip Bubbling Under Flanders)	26
Norway (VG-lista)	12
Romania (Romanian Top 100)	96
Sweden (Sverigetopplistan)	29
Switzerland (Schweizer Hitparade)	51
United Kingdom (Official Charts Company)	200

== Release history ==
Country	Date	Format	Label
Romania	N/A 2010	Enhanced CD	TVR
Sweden	N/A 2010	CD single	TMC
Finland	N/A 2010	CD single	AXR

== See also ==
- List of music released by Romanian artists that has charted in major music markets
