= Zaleilah =

2012 single by Mandinga

Single by Mandinga

from the album Club de Mandinga
- Released: 16 September 2011
- Length: 3:38 (Single version): 2:58 (Eurovision version)
- Label: Cat
- Songwriters: Elena Ionescu; Costi Ioniţă; Omar Secada
- Producers: Ioniţă; Dimitriu Silviu

Mandinga singles chronology
"Europarty" (2011)	"Zaleilah" (2011)	"Papi Chulo" (2012)

Music video
- "Zaleilah" on YouTube

Audio sample
- file; help

Eurovision Song Contest 2012 entry
- Country: Romania
- Artist: Mandinga
- Languages: Spanish; English
- Composers: Costi Ioniţă; Dimitriu Silviu
- Lyricists: Elena Ionescu; Ioniţă; Omar Secada

Finals performance
- Semi-final result: 3
- Semi-final points: 120
- Final result: 12
- Final points: 71

Entry chronology
- ◄ "Change" (2011)
- "It's My Life" (2013) ►

Official performance video
- "Zaleilah" (semi-final 1) on YouTube "Zaleilah" (final) on YouTube

"Zaleilah" is a song by Romanian band Mandinga for their fifth studio album, Club de Mandinga (2012). It was written by Costi Ioniță along with band lead singer Elena Ionescu and member Omar Secada. Produced by Ioniță and Dimitriu Silviu, it was released on 16 September 2011. Musically, "Zaleilah" has been described as Latin-influenced, with other inspirations including Balkan, Cuban, Gypsy and salsa music. A bilingual love song performed in English and Spanish language, its instrumentation consists of a bagpipe, marching drums, accordions and trumpets. Reviewers noticed similarities between "Zaleilah" and "Waka Waka (This Time for Africa)" (2010) by Colombian singer Shakira and "Zou Bisou Bisou" (1964).

The song represented Romania in the Eurovision Song Contest 2012 after winning the pre-selection show Selecția Națională. The country reached 12th place in a field of 26, scoring a total of 71 points. Mandinga's show featured the band members performing choreography and accompanying Ionescu, with pyrotechnics and fireworks also being used. The song received mixed reviews from music critics. While it was praised for its catchiness and dance nature, some viewed it as mediocre and unoriginal. "Zaleilah" received a nomination in the Best Song category at the 2011 Romanian Music Awards.

In order to promote and support "Zaleilah", Mandinga made various appearances to perform the song and embarked on a tour in Belgium and the Netherlands in 2012. An accompanying music video was filmed by Florin Botea in both Romania and Dubai, and was uploaded to YouTube on 9 February 2012. On the same date, the clip was shown at the Grand Cinema Digiplex in Băneasa Shopping City. It portrays Ionescu "waking up" in Dubai after putting on a ring she found near to a club's bathroom tap. Commercially, "Zaleilah" reached the top 100 of various charts after Eurovision, and peaked at numbers two and six in Romania and Moldova, respectively. Uniunea Producătorilor de Fonograme din România (UPFR) certified the track Gold for exceeding 10,000 digital downloads in Romania.

== Background and composition ==
"Zaleilah" was written by Costi Ioniță along with Mandinga lead singer Elena Ionescu and member Omar Secada, while production was handled by Ioniță and Dimitriu Silviu. After being premiered on the group's website on 16 September 2011, Cat Music digitally released the song in various countries on 7 February 2012, along with several remixes. From May to September 2012, the song has also been released in Italy, Mexico and Scandinavian countries. On 11 April 2012, an enhanced CD of "Zaleilah" was distributed in Romania by Cat Music, while a promotional CD was released in Europe through EMI Records that year.

A bilingual song performed in English and Spanish, "Zaleilah" has been described as Latin-influenced; reviewers also noticed inspiration from Balkanic, Cuban, Gypsy and salsa music. Lyrically, it revolves around "a woman deeply in love with her 'chocolate boy', [possibly] someone who is merely sweet, or someone who is of African descent". Lines from the verses, translated into English, include: "you touching me and kissing me makes me want to dance/ I'm so happy, I can shout out loud." During the refrain, "Zaleilah" contains lyrics written in poor English, such as "When you love you say, everyday, everybody", which corrected would have been "When you're in love, say it everyday and tell everybody". The song's instrumentation consists of a bagpipe, marching drums, accordions and trumpets, with a critic likening the accordion sequences to Greek composer Mikis Theodorakis's 1964 instrumental "Zorbas Dance". According to the band, the name of the track belongs to a South American tribe and "actually does not mean anything. It is the name of the dance that [accompanies the song] and of the princess that [Ionescu] plays in the music video."

== Reception ==
Upon its release, "Zaleilah" was met with mixed reviews from music critics. Jan Feddersen, writing for Die Tageszeitung, praised the song for its catchiness and danceable nature. An editor of RTVE similarly commended its catchy chorus and festive atmosphere, while Urban.ro positively noticed the use of simple lyrics. Giga.de and Grantland likened "Zaleilah" to "Waka Waka (This Time for Africa)" (2010) by Colombian singer Shakira and to "Zou Bisou Bisou" (1964). Reviewers from Wiwibloggs had both positive and negative opinions of the recording, praising its optimistic and dance nature, but criticizing it as mediocre, incohesive and lacking originality. Overall, the reviewers on the website gave the song 6.25 out of 10 points. In a 2016 Wiwibloggs poll called "What is your favourite Eurovision song from Romania?", "Zaleilah" finished in second place with over 700 votes. At the 2012 Romanian Music Awards, the track received a nomination in the Best Song category.

"Zaleilah" experienced moderate commercial success on record charts and got heavy rotated in several countries. In Romania, the song peaked at number two on the national Airplay 100 chart in May 2012, while also claiming the same position on Media Forest's radio and television airplay charts. On the service's 2012 year-end chart, the track reached number 10. The Uniunea Producătorilor de Fonograme din România (UPFR) certified "Zaleilah" Gold in the July of that year for exceeding 10,000 in digital copies sold in Romania. In other countries, the song reached number six in Moldova, as well as the top 50 in Sweden and Billboard's Mexico Espanol Airplay chart, the top 60 in Austria and the top 100 in Germany. "Zaleilah" attained lower success in Russia, where it peaked at number 157, and in Flanders, peaking at number 23 on the Ultratip chart, which acts as an extension to the main Ultratop ranking.

== Music video and promotion ==
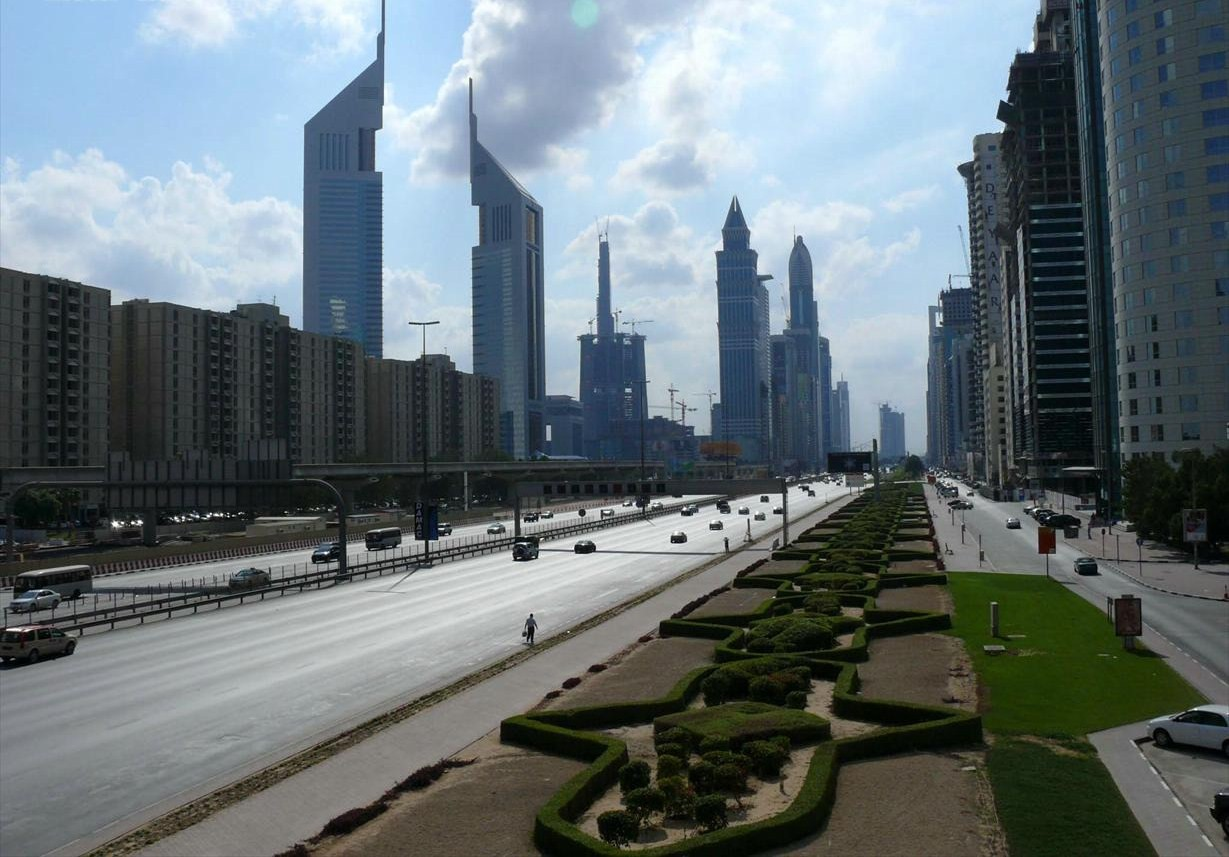
Locations for the music video of "Zaleilah" included Sheikh Zayed Road (pictured) in Dubai.

An accompanying music video for "Zaleilah" was uploaded onto Cat Music's official YouTube account on 9 February 2012, becoming one of their most-watched releases by May 2015. On the same date, it was also shown at the Grand Cinema Digiplex in Băneasa Shopping City at around 19:00. The clip was shot by Florin Botea at Club Fratelli in Romania and in locations such as Sheikh Zayed Road, the Palm Jumeirah Monorail, and Burj Khalifa in Dubai. All outfits used in the video were provided by Florin Dobre and Iuliana Dima.

The visual opens with Ionescu talking with a man at the bar of a club. When she leaves to the bathroom and washes her hands, she discovers a purple ring near the tap and puts it on. The singer subsequently "wakes up" inside a skyscraper and is also seen walking on the streets and the beach of Dubai. She also performs to the song in a desert and resides on a yacht while "search[ing] for love". Towards the end of the video, Ionescu throws the aforementioned ring into the sea, and the clip ends with it being washed ashore. Interspersed shots show Mandinga during a concert at the club presented in the beginning. An editor of Libertatea praised the music video and wrote: "[It] is truly a fascinating journey with exotic shots that make you think of summer, sun and heat".

For further promotion, Mandinga performed "Zaleilah" on several occasions. On 16 September 2011, the band appeared on both Romanian talk show Neatza cu Răzvan și Dani, and the 2011 Romanian Music Awards, presenting a medley with "Danza Kuduro" (2010) by Don Omar and Lucenzo on the latter. In 2012, Mandinga performed on Cronica Cârcotașilor in March, as well as on Europa FM in April and on Radio ZU in May. In the same year, the band also embarked on a tour in Belgium and the Netherlands to perform the track. Outside of the promotion phase of "Zaleilah", it was performed on Pro FM's "Bagă Mare" beach event in August 2013, and on Radio 21 in October 2014

== At Eurovision ==
=== National selection ===
The Romanian Television (TVR) organized the Selecția Națională in order to select its entrant for the Eurovision Song Contest 2012 and opened the submission period for artists' and composers' entries between 6 and 23 February 2012. Out of all submissions, a jury panel internally selected 15 songs to participate in the contest's final held on 10 March 2012. Subsequently, "Zaleilah" was chosen to represent Romania at Eurovision after the votes of a jury panel (ten points) and public televoting (12 points) were combined, resulting in 22 points. Mixed reactions followed after Mandinga's win, with multiple individuals criticizing the song itself and attributing the band's victory to arranged voting. Others however favoured the band's win and praised "Zaleilah".

=== Eurovision ===
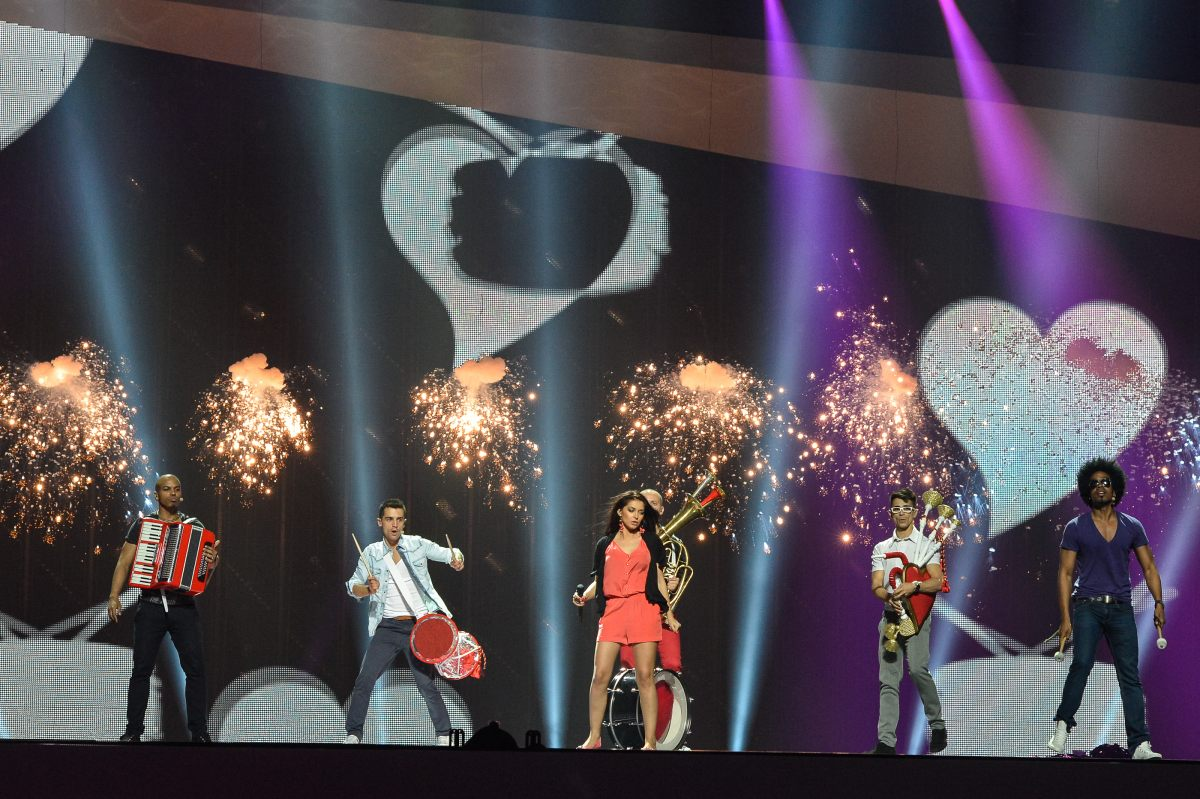
Mandinga performing during a rehearsal for the Eurovision Song Contest 2012 at the Baku Crystal Hall in Baku, Azerbaijan.

The Eurovision Song Contest 2012 took place at the Baku Crystal Hall in Baku, Azerbaijan and consisted of two semi-finals on 22 and 24 May, and the final on 26 May 2012. According to the Eurovision rules, all participating countries, except the host country and the "Big Five" (France, Germany, Italy, Spain, and the United Kingdom), were required to qualify from one semi-final to compete for the final; the top ten countries from the respective semi-final progressed to the final. Mandinga sang sixth in the first semi-final following Albania and preceding Switzerland, while they performed 14th in the Grand Final following Azerbaijan and preceding Denmark. At the first semi-final, Ionescu's ear monitor malfunctioned, prompting the show's organizers to issue an apologize for the problem.

During Mandinga's performance, the LED background displayed images of drums moving along to the song's rhythm, as well as of beating hearts in several colors including purple, yellow and orange "representing the strong fiery nature of the Latin beat". Pyrotechnics were used along with "strobe lighting" and fireworks towards the end of the performance. Mandinga, along with Slovenian choreographer Anze Skrubehad, also created a choreography and released a tutorial video online; its central focus is the theme of love. During their show, lead singer Ionescu wears an orange dress and is accompanied by her band members; they carry instruments which were designed by Alexandru Ghilduş and Costel Badea. Holger Kreitling of Die Welt likened Ionescu's appearance to that of American singer Nicole Scherzinger and criticized the outfits of the rest of the group. An editor of Realitatea positively noticed the singer's appearance as playful and attractive.

==== Points awarded to Romania ====
Below is a breakdown of points awarded to Romania in the first semi-final and Grand Final of the contest. On the first occasion, the country finished in third place with a total of 120 points, including 12 from Spain, Ireland and Moldova, ten from Italy, and eight from Russia, Israel and Greece. In the Grand Final of the Eurovision Song Contest, Romania finished in 12th position, gathering a total of 71 points, including 12 awarded by Moldova, ten by Spain and seven by Italy and Greece.

Points awarded to Romania (Semi-Final 1)
12 points	10 points	8 points	7 points	6 points
Ireland; Moldova; Spain	Italy	Greece; Israel; Russia	Azerbaijan; Montenegro	Cyprus; San Marino
5 points	4 points	3 points	2 points	1 point
Albania; Austria	Belgium; Iceland	Hungary	Switzerland	Denmark

Points awarded to Romania (Final)
12 points	10 points	8 points	7 points	6 points
Moldova	Spain		Greece; Italy	Azerbaijan; Israel
5 points	4 points	3 points	2 points	1 point
Ireland	Portugal; Turkey	Belgium; Cyprus	France	Denmark; Russia

== Track listing ==
- Digital download (Note: This is a summary of all versions of "Zaleilah" found on its digital releases in multiple countries.)
1. "Zaleilah" – 3:38
2. "Zaleilah" (Radio Edit) – 3:40
3. "Zaleilah" (Eurovision Version) – 2:58
4. "Zaleilah" (Extended) – 5:36
5. "Zaleilah" (Quentin Remix) – 6:16
6. "Zaleilah" (SoundFactory Radio Mix) – 3:39
7. "Zaleilah" (SoundFactory Club Mix) – 7:42
8. "Zaleilah" (SoundFactory Dub Mix) – 8:02
9. "Zaleilah" (Peet Syntax & Alexie Divello Radio Edit) – 3:23
10. "Zaleilah" (Peet Syntax & Alexie Club Mix) – 5:52
- Romanian CD single
1. "Zaleilah" (Eurovision Version) – 2:58
2. "Zaleilah" (Radio Edit) – 3:38
3. "Zaleilah" (Extended Mix) – 5:36
4. "Zaleilah" (Quentin Remix) – 6:15
5. "Zaleilah" (Short Radio Version) – 3:00
6. Extra data (Note: Apart from five audio tracks, the enhanced CD featured "extra data" consisting of facts on Mandinga and "Zaleilah", footage of the band, the song's lyrics and its official music video.)
- European promotional CD single
1. "Zaleilah" (Peet Syntax & Alexie Divello Radio Edit) – 3:24
2. "Zaleilah" (Peet Syntax & Alexie Divello Club Mix) – 5:53
3. "Zaleilah" (SoundFactory Radio Mix) – 3:40
4. "Zaleilah" (SoundFactory Club Mix) – 7:42
5. "Zaleilah" (SoundFactory Club Mix Instrumental) – 7:42
6. "Zaleilah" (SoundFactory Dub Mix) – 8:02

== Charts ==
=== Weekly charts ===
Chart (2012)	Peak position
Austria (Ö3 Austria Top 40)	55
Belgium (Ultratip Bubbling Under Flanders)	23
Germany (GfK)	92
Mexico Espanol Airplay (Billboard)	45
Moldova Radio Songs (Media Forest)	6
Romania (Airplay 100)	2
Romania Radio Songs (Media Forest)	2
Romania TV Airplay (Media Forest)	2
Russia (Tophit)	167
Sweden (Sverigetopplistan)	48

=== Year-end charts ===
Chart (2012)	Peak position
Romania (Media Forest)	10

== Certifications ==
Region	Certification	Certified units/sales
Romania	Gold	10,000

== Release history ==
Country	Date	Format	Label
Romania	16 September 2011	—N/a	—N/a
Various	7 February 2012	Digital download	Cat
Romania	11 April 2012	Enhanced CD	Cat
Scandinavia	4 May 2012	Digital download	Parlophone
Italy	13 July 2012	Digital download	DIY
Mexico	9 September 2012	Digital download	Mas Label/ Empo
Europe	N/A 2012	CD single	EMI

== See also ==
- List of music released by Romanian artists that has charted in major music markets
