= Let Me Try =

2005 song performed by Luminița Anghel

- Enhanced CD cover

Single by Luminița Anghel and Sistem
- Released: 2005
- Genre: Disco
- Length: 3:02
- Label: TVR
- Songwriter: Cristian Faur
- Producer: Faur

Luminița Anghel singles chronology
| "Let Me Try" (2005) | "Love Will Come" (2005) |

Audio sample
- file; help

Eurovision Song Contest 2005 entry
- Country: Romania
- Artists: Luminița Anghel; Toth Zoltan; Mihai Ciprian Rogojan; Claudiu Purcărin; Robert Magheti; Florin Cătălin Romașcu
- As: Luminița Anghel and Sistem
- Language: English
- Composer: Cristian Faur
- Lyricist: Faur

Finals performance
- Semi-final result: 1st
- Semi-final points: 235
- Final result: 3rd
- Final points: 158

Entry chronology
- ◄ "I Admit" (2004)
- "Tornerò" (2006) ►

"Let Me Try" is a song recorded by Romanian singer Luminița Anghel and Romanian percussion band Sistem, consisting of Toth Zoltan, Mihai Ciprian Rogojan, Claudiu Purcărin, Robert Magheti and Florin Cătălin Romașcu. It was released as a CD single in 2005 by the Romanian Television (TVR). Romanian composer Cristian Faur wrote and produced the single for Anghel, who subsequently recorded it in collaboration with Sistem. Musically, "Let Me Try" is an uptempo folk-influenced disco song.

The song represented Romania in the Eurovision Song Contest 2005 in Kyiv, Ukraine after winning the pre-selection show Selecția Națională. Anghel and Sistem's win was surrounded by controversy after the second-placed Romanian singer Loredana Groza accused TVR of conspiracy and arranged voting. In Kyiv, the artists qualified in first place for the Grand Final, where they came in third place with a total of 158 points. This remains Romania's best placement to date, alongside 2010's "Playing with Fire" by Paula Seling and Ovi. During their show, Anghel performed the song in front of Sistem, who were drumming on oil barrels and used grinding equipment to create a "spark rain".

Music critics gave positive reviews of the song, praising its originality and Anghel's vocal delivery. The artists were also awarded a special prize by Romanian V.I.P magazine, as well as received a nomination at the Radio România Actualități Awards. "Let Me Try" fared well commercially, and was given heavy airplay on television and radio stations in multiple countries. It peaked at number nine on the native Romanian Top 100. Promotion consisted of various concerts, television and festival appearances, as well as the release of an accompanying music video in 2005.

== Background and promotion ==
An uptempo folk-influenced disco song, "Let Me Try" was both written and produced by Romanian composer Cristian Faur for Romanian singer Luminița Anghel, who recorded the song in collaboration with Romanian percussion band Sistem. The latter two had already desired to collaborate since 2001, when Anghel won the first prize at that year's Golden Stag Festival.

Anghel and Sistem promoted the song "intensely" in the last week prior to the national selection for the Eurovision Song Contest 2005, where it was submitted, which allegedly attracted many televotes. Similar promotion through concerts, television and festival appearances occurred after they had been selected as the Romanian entrants for the contest, partially interfering with the preparation for their show at Eurovision. A music video for "Let Me Try" was also released in 2005 and included on an enhanced CD release of the single that year. It features Anghel performing to the song and Sistem drumming on barrels in a desert.

== Reception and accolades ==
Although Romanian media initially responded negatively to "Let Me Try", the song received positive reviews from music critics after the Eurovision Song Contest. An editor from website 9am.ro called the track "dynamic" and wrote that Sistem's "industrial rhythms" make it original. Flavia Jurca of Unica magazine listed the song in her list of memorable duets in the Romanian music industry, praising Anghel's vocal delivery and writing that Romania should have won the contest in 2005. In a 2016 poll on Wiwibloggs called "What is your favourite Eurovision song from Romania?", "Let Me Try" finished in third place with over 600 votes.

According to a Europa FM writer, the song was given heavy airplay on television and radio stations in multiple countries after the contest. It also peaked at number nine on native Romanian Top 100. On 30 March 2005, Anghel and Sistem were awarded a special prize by V.I.P magazine, handed out by Romanian singer-songwriter Ovidiu Lipan Țăndărică. They also won Artist of the Year and received a nomination in the Best Dance-Pop Song category at the 2006 Radio România Actualități Awards. In a mid 2005 interview with Georgios Kalpakidis in Greece, Anghel revealed that her appearance at Eurovision led to proposals from the Netherlands, Hungary, Germany and England.

== At Eurovision ==
=== National selection ===
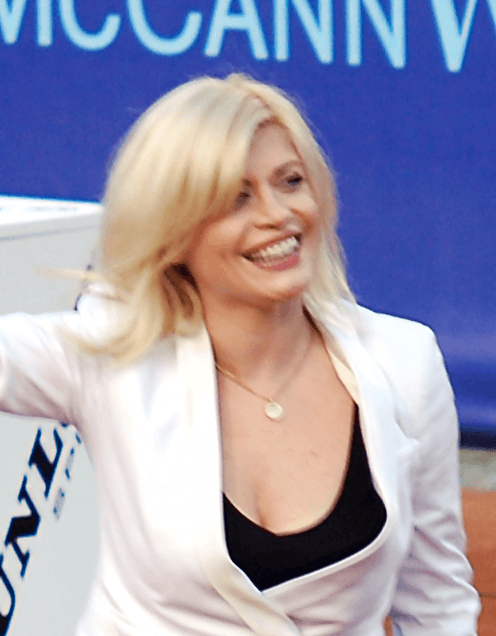
Romanian singer and national final contestant Loredana Groza (pictured in 2009) sparked controversy after accusing the Romanian Television (TVR) of conspiracy and arranged voting upon the event.

On 5 March 2005, the Selecția Națională was held in order to select the Romanian entrant for the Eurovision Song Contest, where "Let Me Try" was chosen after the votes of a 12-member professional jury panel (135 points) and public televoting (10.832 phone calls) were combined, resulting in 206 points. Romanian singer Loredana Groza, who placed second in the national final with her song "Le Le", sparked controversy after accusing the Romanian Television (TVR) of conspiracy and arranged voting. According to Groza, TVR allegedly demanded the copyright of "Le Le" prior to the national selection, and a friend of hers could not vote for her as the line was continuously busy. The singer's accusations were denied by both Anghel and the organizers of the event.

=== In Kyiv ===
The Eurovision Song Contest 2005 took place at the Palace of Sports in Kyiv, Ukraine and consisted of one semi-final on 19 May, and the final on 21 May 2005. According to the then-Eurovision rules, selected countries, except the host country and the "Big Four" (France, Germany, Spain and the United Kingdom), were required to qualify from the semi-final to compete for the final; the top ten countries from the semi-final progressed to the final. On the first occasion, Anghel and Sistem performed 14th, preceded by Norway and followed by Hungary, while they sang fourth in the Grand Final, preceded by Malta and followed by Norway.

The artists' show consisted of Anghel performing the song, wearing a green top with a pair of jeans, in front of Sistem, who contributed to the track's instrumentation by "wildly" drumming on oil barrels in a similar way to German industrial band Einstürzende Neubauten. While the singer joined the group's activities during an instrumental part, Sistem also used side cutters and a grinding wheel to create what a Eurovision.de writer described as "spark rain" onstage. The website further found the combination between traditional music and the "unconventional" instruments to be "unusual".

== Track listing ==
CD single
| No. | Title | Length |
|---|---|---|
| 1. | "Let Me Try" | 3:02 |
| 2. | "Let Me Try" (Video) | 3:02 |

== Charts ==
=== Weekly charts ===
| Chart (2005) | Peak position |
|---|---|
| Romania (Romanian Top 100) | 9 |

=== Year-end charts ===
| Chart (2005) | Peak position |
|---|---|
| Romania (Romanian Top 100) | 45 |

== Release history ==
| Country | Date | Format | Label |
|---|---|---|---|
| Romania | N/A 2005 | Enhanced CD | TVR |
