= Mandinga (band) =

Romanian pop group

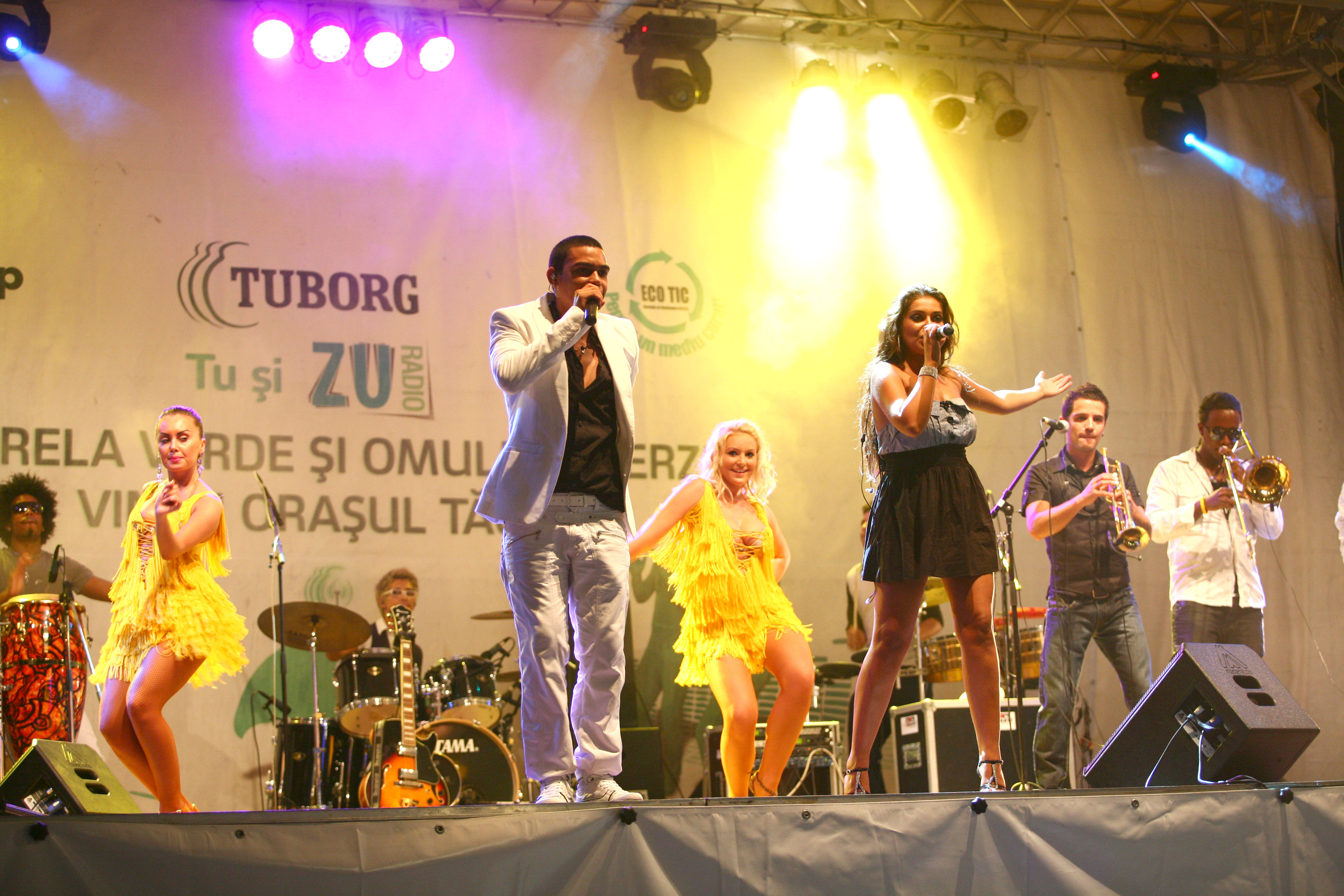
- Mandinga in 2009

Background information
- Origin: Bucharest, Romania
- Genres: Latin pop, salsa
- Years active: 2002–present
- Labels: Cat Music
- Members: Barbara Isasi; Alex; Chupi; Zach (Valle); El Niño; Omar; Tony
- Past members: Elena Gheorghe; Elena Ionescu
- Website: mandinga.ro

Mandinga is a Romanian pop group band from Bucharest. The original soloist of the band was Elena Gheorghe who left in 2005. From 2006 until 2016, the lead vocalist was Elena Ionescu. Ionescu left the band in March 2016 to pursue a solo career and was replaced by Spanish singer Barbara Isasi.

After winning the Romanian national final, the group represented Romania in the Eurovision Song Contest 2012 and placed 12th with the song "Zaleilah".

== Discography ==
=== Albums ===
- ...de corazón (2003)
- Soarele Meu (2005)
- Gozalo (2006)
- Donde (2008)
- Club de Mandinga (2012)

=== Singles ===
International singles

List of singles, with selected chart positions
Year	Title	Peak chart positions			Certifications	Album
Year	Title	ROM	NED	SWE	Certifications	Album
2012	"Europarty"	—	—	—		Club de Mandinga
2012	"Zaleilah"	2	78	48		Club de Mandinga
2012	"Papichulo"	—	—	—		Club de Mandinga
2013	"The Mac Mac Song"	—	—	—		
2013	"La Vita E Bella"	—	—	—		
2013	"Cinéma"	—	—	—		

== See also ==
- List of music released by Romanian artists that has charted in major music markets
