= Nina Zilli discography =

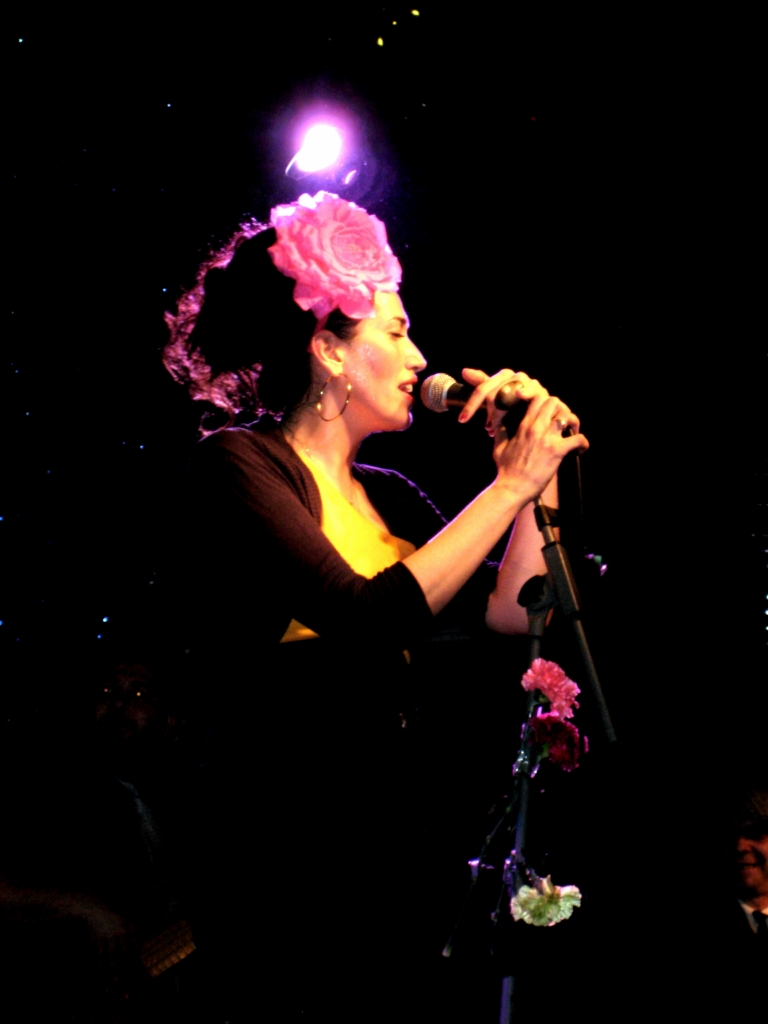
- Nina Zilli performing in 2010
- Studio albums: 4
- EPs: 1
- Singles: 16
- Music videos: 15

Italian singer-songwriter Nina Zilli has released four studio albums, an extended play and sixteen singles. She released her debut extended play, Nina Zilli, in September 2009. It peaked at number 54 on the Italian Albums Chart. The EP includes the singles "50mila" and "L'inferno". She released her debut studio album, Sempre lontano, in February 2010. It peaked at number 5 on the Italian Albums Chart. The album includes the singles "L'uomo che amava le donne" and "Bacio d'a(d)dio". She released her second studio album, L'amore è femmina, in 15 February 2012. It peaked at number 11 on the Italian Albums Chart. The album includes the singles "Per sempre", "L'amore è femmina", "Per le strade" and "Una notte". Zilli was chosen to represent Italy in the Eurovision Song Contest 2012 in Baku, Azerbaijan, where she placed 9th with the song "L'amore è femmina (Out of Love)". She released her third studio album, Frasi & fumo, in February 2015. It peaked at number 15 on the Italian Albums Chart. The album includes the singles "Sola" and "#RLL (Riprenditi le lacrime)". She released her fourth studio album, Modern Art, in September 2017. It peaked at number 17 on the Italian Albums Chart. The album includes the singles "Mi hai fatto fare tardi", "Domani arriverà (Modern Art)", "Senza appartenere", "1xUnattimo" and "Ti amo mi uccidi".

== Albums ==
Title	Details	Peak chart positions	Certifications
Title	Details	ITA	Certifications
Sempre lontano	Released: 19 February 2010; Label: Universal; Format: CD, download	5	FIMI: Platinum
L'amore è femmina	Released: 15 February 2012; Label: Universal; Format: CD, download	11	FIMI: Gold
Frasi & fumo	Released: 12 February 2015; Label: Universal; Format: CD, download	15	
Modern Art	Released: 1 September 2017; Label: Universal; Format: CD, download	17	

== Extended plays ==
Title	Details	Peak chart positions
Title	Details	ITA
Nina Zilli	Released: 11 September 2009; Label: Universal; Format: CD, download	54

== Singles ==
=== As lead artist ===
Title	Year	Peak chart positions	Certifications	Album
Title	Year	ITA	Certifications	Album
"50mila" (featuring Giuliano Palma)	2009	16	FIMI: Gold	Nina Zilli
"L'inferno"	2009	—		Nina Zilli
"L'uomo che amava le donne"	2010	15	FIMI: Gold	Sempre lontano
"Bacio d'a(d)dio"	2010	—		Sempre lontano
"Per sempre"	2012	5	FIMI: Platinum	L'amore è femmina
"L'amore è femmina"	2012	40		L'amore è femmina
"Per le strade"	2012	—		L'amore è femmina
"Una notte"	2012	—		L'amore è femmina
"Sola"	2015	50		Frasi & fumo
"#RLL (Riprenditi le lacrime)"	2015	—		Frasi & fumo
"Mi hai fatto fare tardi"	2017	—		Modern Art
"Domani arriverà (Modern Art)"	2017	—		Modern Art
"Senza appartenere"	2018	74		Modern Art
"1xUnattimo"	2018	—		Modern Art
"Ti amo mi uccidi"	2018	—		Modern Art
"Schiacciacuore" (with Nitro)	2020	—		Non-album single
"—" denotes a recording that did not chart or was not released in that territory.

=== As featured artist ===
Title	Year	Peak chart positions	Certifications	Album
Title	Year	ITA	Certifications	Album
"Uno di quei giorni" (J-Ax featuring Nina Zilli)	2014	13	FIMI: Platinum	Il bello d'esser brutti
"Tu e d'io" (Danti featuring Nina Zilli & J-Ax)	2019	—		Non-album single
"Diva" (Ntò featuring Enzo Avitabile & Nina Zilli)	2020	—		Nevada
"—" denotes a recording that did not chart or was not released in that territory.

== Music videos ==
Title	Year	Director(s)
"50mila"	2009	Naù Germoglio
"L'amore verrà"	2009	Naù Germoglio
"L'uomo che amava le donne"	2010	
"50mila" (New Version)	2010	Naù Germoglio
"Bacio d'a(d)dio"	2010	
"Per sempre"	2012	Duccio Forzano
"L'amore è femmina"	2012	Cosimo Alemà
"Una notte"	2012	Fabio Jansen
"Uno di quei giorni"	2015	Fabrizio Conte
"Sola"	2015	Alex Infascelli
