= Sanremo Music Festival 2012 =

Italian song contest (62nd edition)

Dates and venue
- Semi-final 1: 14 February 2012
- Semi-final 2: 15 February 2012
- Semi-final 3: 16 February 2012
- Semi-final 4: 17 February 2012
- Final: 18 February 2012
- Venue: Teatro Ariston; Sanremo, Italy

Production
- Broadcaster: Radiotelevisione italiana (RAI)
- Director: Stefano Vicario
- Musical director: Marco Sabiu
- Artistic director: Gianmarco Mazzi
- Presenters: Gianni Morandi and Rocco Papaleo, Ivana Mrázová

Vote
- Voting system: Mixed (televotes, jury, orchestra votes and journalists' "golden share")

Big Artists section
- Number of entries: 14
- Winner: "Non è l'inferno" Emma

Newcomers' section
- Number of entries: 8
- Winner: "È vero (che ci sei)" Alessandro Casillo

The Sanremo Music Festival 2012 (Italian: Festival di Sanremo 2012), officially the 62nd Italian Song Festival (62º Festival della canzone italiana), was the 62nd annual Sanremo Music Festival, held at the Teatro Ariston in Sanremo between 14 and 18 February 2012, and broadcast by Radiotelevisione italiana (RAI). The show was presented by Gianni Morandi with Ivana Mrázová and Rocco Papaleo.

The competition was divided in two different sections. The Big Artists section, including 14 established Italian artists performing a new song, was won by Emma Marrone with "Non è l'inferno". The Newcomers section, featuring 8 debuting or little-known artists, was won by Alessandro Casillo with "È vero (che ci sei)"; two of them were chosen through the contest Area Sanremo, and six of them were chosen as the winners of the web contest SanremoSocial.

At the end of the competition, Nina Zilli, who had competed in the Big Artists section of the festival with "Per sempre", was chosen by a specific jury as the Italian entrant for the Eurovision Song Contest 2012, where she would perform "L'amore è femmina". Alessandro Casillo was excluded from the selection since he would be under the age of 16 by the time of the contest, contravening the rules.

== Presenters and personnel ==
Sanremo Music Festival 2012 presenters

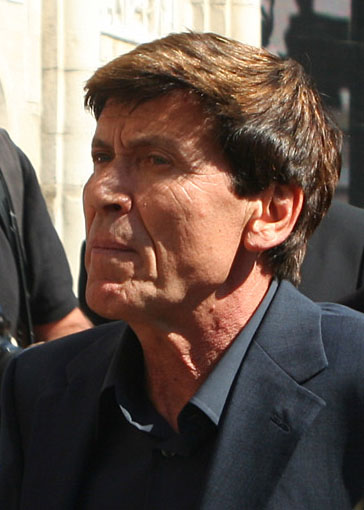
Gianni Morandi

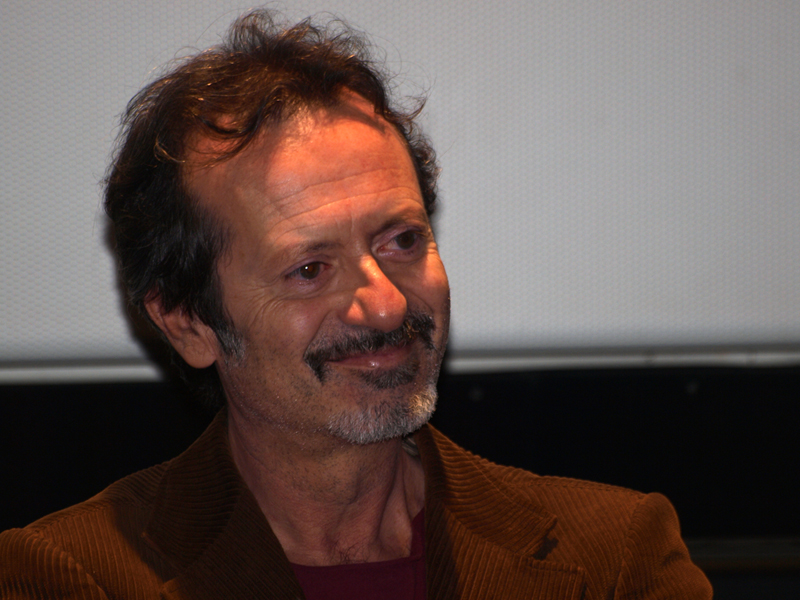
Rocco Papaleo

A few hours after the final of the Sanremo Music Festival 2011, Rai 1 director Mauro Mazza expressed his willing to confirm Gianni Morandi as the main presenter of the show for the 2012 contest. In an interview released in April 2011, Morandi revealed he was considering the opportunity to present the contest for a second time, and on 13 October 2011 Morandi was officially confirmed as the presenter of the Sanremo Music Festival 2012. On the same day, Gianmarco Mazzi, who had signed a 2 years long contract with RAI in late 2010, was confirmed as the artistic director of the show. It was Mazzi's seventh Sanremo Music Festival.

In late December 2011, Gianmarco Mazzi also announced that Italian actor and director Rocco Papaleo, Czech model Ivana Mrázová and English-Croatian model Tamara Ecclestone would have been Morandi's co-presenters of the show. Despite this, on 20 January 2012, Gianmarco Mazzi officially announced that Tamara Ecclestone would not be one of the presenters, following her refusal to be in Sanremo during the rehearsal for the show. During an interview released to the Italian newspaper La Stampa, Ecclestone claimed that she had never signed any contract, and that, according to her informal agreement with RAI, she should have been in Sanremo starting from 12 February 2012, but she was later asked to start working on the show on 1 February 2012. Following a neck pain, Ivana Mrázová was not on stage during the first night of the show, and she was replaced by 2011 co-presenters Elisabetta Canalis and Belén Rodríguez.

The authors of the show, directed by Stefano Vicario, were Ivano Balduini, Simona Ercolani, Michele Ferrari, Francesco Valitutti and Federico Moccia. For the nineteenth time, the scenography, inspired by a spacecraft, was created by Gaetano Castelli, together with his daughter Chiara. For the tenth consecutive year, each artist was accompanied by the Sanremo Festival Orchestra, conducted by Marco Sabiu, as in 2011.

== Selections ==
=== Newcomers section ===
==== AreaSanremo ====
The artists competing in the newcomers section were selected through two different contests. The first one, organized by the Comune di Sanremo and titled AreaSanremo, was divided into two sections—SanremoLab, reserved to Italian-language songs, and SanremoDoc, featuring songs in an Italian dialect. The jury evaluating the SanremoLab contestants was composed of Niccolò Agliardi, Beppe Carletti, L'Aura and Mauro Ermanno Giovanardi, while the jury for the SanremoDoc section included Massimo Morini, Davide Van De Sfroos, Peppe Voltarelli and Edoardo Bennato.

The 10 winners of the contest—Levy Prato, Kachupa, Erika Mineo, Andrea Devis Mozzate, Bidiel, Giuseppe Franchino, Lavinia Desideri and Iohosemprevoglia in the SanremoLab section, Luca Bussoleti and the duo composed of Stefano Cherchi and Maurizio Chisari for the SanremoDoc section—were announced on 8 December 2011. On 9 December 2011, a jury composed of Gianni Morandi, Gianmarco Mazzi, Giorgio Giuffra and Claudia Lolli selected two acts among the ten winners. Therefore, the bands Bidiel and Iohosemprevoglia became the first two confirmed contestants of the Sanremo Music Festival 2012.

==== SanremoSocial ====
The remaining six contestants were selected through a web contest, titled SanremoSocial. 400 out of 1,574 participants in the contest were excluded because their songs did not fulfill the rules to participate in the Sanremo Music Festival, mainly concerning the length of the song or the inclusion of advertisers' brands in their lyrics.

After uploading a video of the proposed song through the social network Facebook, contestants were voted by users, and the 30 most voted acts, together with 30 additional artists chosen by a specific jury, were asked to perform live on 12 January 2012, during the Sanremo Social Day, broadcast live on the Festival's official website. At the end of the live performances, the artists were selected by a jury composed of presenter Gianni Morandi, artistic director Gianmarco Mazzi, Rai Radio 1's Gianmaurizio Foderaro and Silvia Notargiacomo, Rai Radio 2's Federica Gentile and Facebook account manager Saverio Schiano Lomoriello. The six winners of the contest—Giordana Angi, Erica Mou, Celeste Gaia, Marco Guazzone, Giulia Anania and Alessandro Casillo—were announced on 14 January 2012 during the TV show SanremoSocial Day - La scelta.

=== Big Artists section ===
The acts participating in the Big Artists section of the Sanremo Music Festival 2012 were chosen through an internal selection. In early December 2011, during an interview released to the Italian magazine TV Sorrisi e Canzoni, Emma Marrone announced she would be one of the contestants of the festival. On 24 December 2011, Eugenio Finardi also confirmed he would compete in the Big Artists section, performing the song "E tu lo chiami Dio". The complete list of the participants in the Big Artists section was announced on 15 January 2012, during the TV programme L'arena. Alongside Marrone and Finardi, the list included Dolcenera, Arisa, Samuele Bersani, Chiara Civello, Francesco Renga, Irene Fornaciari, Marlene Kuntz, Nina Zilli, Noemi, Matia Bazar, Pierdavide Carone with Lucio Dalla, and the duo composed of Gigi D'Alessio and Loredana Bertè.

Immediately after the list's announcement, some fans claimed that Gigi D'Alessio and Loredana Bertè had already released a small portion of their song through their official Facebook accounts, despite the contest rules, according to which the competing songs cannot be publicly performed or released before the show. On the same day, Alessandro Fabrizi, manager of Italian singer Daniele Magro, claimed that Chiara Civello's song was publicly performed by Magro, Civello herself, and by Daiana Tejera, co-writer of the song. However, on 2 February 2012, RAI released a press statement announcing that the two songs fulfilled the requirements for being considered "new songs", therefore Civello, D'Alessio and Berté were confirmed as participants in the show.

== Shows ==
=== First night ===
==== Big Artists section ====
On 14 February 2012, each act in the "Big Artists" section performed a previously unreleased song. According to the rules of the contest, a ranking should have been determined by a jury composed of 300 people, each one giving a minimum of 1 point and a maximum of 10 points to each song, and at the end of the night, the two artists receiving the lowest points should have been eliminated. However, during the second performance of the night, a technical problem in the voting system occurred. In the beginning, the jury was asked to continue voting through a paper-based system, but after the last performance, it was announced that the voting was nullified. Therefore, all the artists were admitted to the second night of the show.

Due to illness, co-presenter Ivana Mrázová was unable to attend. She was substituted by Belen Rodriguez and Elisabetta Canalis, the co-presenters of the 2011 festival.

Singer and actor Adriano Celentano was a notable guest the first night. He caused much controversy when he attacked the Catholic Church and the Italian Catholic magazine Famiglia Cristiana and newspaper Avvenire during his monologue.

Performances of the contestants of the Big Artists section on the first night
R/O	Artist(s)	Song	Songwriter(s)
1	Dolcenera	"Ci vediamo a casa"	Dolcenera
2	Samuele Bersani	"Un pallone"	Samuele Bersani
3	Noemi	"Sono solo parole"	Fabrizio Moro
4	Francesco Renga	"La tua bellezza"	Francesco Renga; Diego Mancino; Dario Faini
5	Chiara Civello	"Al posto del mondo"	Chiara Civello; Daiana Tejera
6	Irene Fornaciari	"Grande mistero"	Davide Van De Sfroos
7	Emma Marrone	"Non è l'inferno"	Francesco Silvestre; Enrico Palmosi; Luca Sala
8	Marlene Kuntz	"Canzone per un figlio"	Cristiano Godano; Riccardo Tesio; Luca Bergia
9	Eugenio Finardi	"E tu lo chiami Dio"	Roberta Di Lorenzo
10	Gigi D'Alessio & Loredana Bertè	"Respirare"	Gigi D'Alessio; Vincenzo D'Agostino
11	Nina Zilli	"Per sempre"	Roberto Casalino; Nina Zilli
12	Pierdavide Carone & Lucio Dalla	"Nanì"	Pierdavide Carone; Lucio Dalla
13	Arisa	"La notte"	Giuseppe Anastasi
14	Matia Bazar	"Sei tu"	Piero Cassano; Giancarlo Golzi; Fabio Perversi

=== Second night ===
==== Big Artists section ====
During the second night, that was held on 15 February 2012, each one of the 14 acts in the "Big Artists" section performed for a second time the chosen song. Each artists received a minimum of 1 and a maximum of 10 points from each member of a jury, composed of 300 people, and the four artists receiving the lowest points—Pierdavide Carone with Lucio Dalla, Marlene Kuntz, Irene Fornaciari and Gigi D'Alessio with Loredana Bertè—were eliminated from the competition.

Performances of the contestants of the Big Artists section on the second night
R/O	Artist(s)	Song	Points	Place
1	Nina Zilli	"Per sempre"	2,254	1
2	Arisa	"La notte"	2,127	2
3	Gigi D'Alessio & Loredana Bertè	"Respirare"	1,591	11
4	Pierdavide Carone & Lucio Dalla	"Nanì"	1,540	13
5	Matia Bazar	"Sei tu"	1,725	9
6	Eugenio Finardi	"E tu lo chiami Dio"	1,752	8
7	Emma Marrone	"Non è l'inferno"	2,126	3
8	Marlene Kuntz	"Canzone per un figlio"	1,298	14
9	Irene Fornaciari	"Grande mistero"	1,571	12
10	Samuele Bersani	"Un pallone"	1,665	10
11	Chiara Civello	"Al posto del mondo"	1,895	6
12	Noemi	"Sono solo parole"	2,099	4
13	Francesco Renga	"La tua bellezza"	1,926	5
14	Dolcenera	"Ci vediamo a casa"	1,859	7

==== Newcomers section ====
Each artist in the Newcomers section performed for the first time the competing song on 15 February 2012. Four different matches were determined by votes received through Facebook during the previous weeks—the act receiving the most votes competed with the one receiving the fewest votes, and so on. The outcome of each match was determined by televoting only. In each match, the artist receiving the lowest votes was eliminated from the competition, while the remaining four acts were admitted to the fourth night.

Performances of the contestants of the Newcomers section on the second night
Match	R/O	Artist	Song	Songwriter(s)	Result
1	1	Alessandro Casillo	"È vero (che ci sei)"	Matteo Bassi; Emiliano Bassi	89.15%
1	2	Giordana Angi	"Incognita poesia"	Giordana Angi	10.85%
2	3	Iohosemprevoglia	"Incredibile"	Vittorio Nacci	68.90%
2	4	Celeste Gaia	"Carlo"	Celeste Gaia Torti	31.10%
3	5	Erica Mou	"Nella vasca da bagno del tempo"	Erica Musci	63.82%
3	6	Bidiel	"Sono un errore"	Brando Madonia; Mattia Madonia	36.18%
4	7	Marco Guazzone	"Guasto"	Marco Guazzone; Stefano Costantini; Dario Ceruti	62.20%
4	8	Giulia Anania	"La mail che non ti ho scritto"	Giulia Anania; Dario Faini; Emiliano Cecere	37.80%

=== Third night ===
==== International duets ====
During the third nigh, each participant in the "Big Artists" section, including the eliminated ones, performed a foreign-language version of a popular Italian song, together with an international guest. The artists and the songs were announced together with the participants in the festival. On 26 January 2012, it was announced that Nina Hagen, originally included in the list released on 15 January 2012 as the team partner of Loredana Bertè and Gigi D'Alessio, was replaced by Macy Gray, performing the English version of Mia Martini's "Almeno tu nell'universo" instead of a German-language cover of "Piccolo uomo". At the end of the night, journalists in the press room voted the best performance. The competition, completely unrelated to the main competition, was won by Marlene Kuntz with Patti Smith, performing "The World Became the World", the English-language version of Premiata Forneria Marconi's "Impressioni di settembre".

Performances of the contestants of the Big Artists section on the third night
R/O	Italian artist(s)	International artist(s)	Song	Original title and artist(s)
1	Chiara Civello	Shaggy	"You Don't Have to Say You Love Me"	"Io che non vivo (senza te)" (Pino Donaggio)
2	Samuele Bersani	Goran Bregović	"My Sweet Romagna"	"Romagna mia" (Secondo Casadei)
3	Nina Zilli	Skye Edwards	"Never, Never, Never"	"Grande grande grande" (Mina)
4	Matia Bazar	Al Jarreau	"Speak Softly Love"	"Speak Softly Love" (Nino Rota)
5	Emma Marrone	Gary Go	"(If Paradise Is) Half as Nice"	"Il paradiso" (La Ragazza 77 & Patty Pravo)
6	Arisa	José Feliciano	"Qué será"	"Che sarà" (Ricchi e Poveri and José Feliciano)
7	Francesco Renga	Sergio Dalma	"El mundo"	"Il mondo" (Jimmy Fontana)
8	Pierdavide Carone & Lucio Dalla	Mads Langer	"Anema e core"	"Anema e core" (Tito Schipa)
9	Irene Fornaciari	Brian May and Kerry Ellis	"I (Who Have Nothing)"	"Uno dei tanti" (Joe Sentieri)
10	Marlene Kuntz	Patti Smith	"The World Became the World"	"Impressioni di settembre" (Premiata Forneria Marconi)
11	Gigi D'Alessio & Loredana Bertè	Macy Gray	"The Flame"	"Almeno tu nell'universo" (Mia Martini)
12	Eugenio Finardi	Noa	"Surrender"	"Torna a Surriento" (Mario Massa)
13	Dolcenera	Professor Green	"My Life Is Mine"	"Vita spericolata" (Vasco Rossi)
14	Noemi	Sarah Jane Morris	"To Feel in Love"	"Amarsi un po'" (Lucio Battisti)

==== Repechage round ====
The four songs eliminated during the second night were performed again, and televoting determined the two songs to be reinstated in the competition. Gigi D'Alessio with Loredana Bertè and Pierdavide Carone with Lucio Dalla were admitted to the semi-final of the show, while Irene Fornaciari and Marlene Kuntz were eliminated from the competition.

Performances of the eliminated "Big Artists"
R/O	Artist(s)	Song	Votes	Result
1	Pierdavide Carone & Lucio Dalla	"Nanì"	49.39%	Back in competition
2	Gigi D'Alessio & Loredana Bertè	"Respirare"	30.82%	Back in competition
3	Irene Fornaciari	"Grande mistero"	12.06%	Eliminated
4	Marlene Kuntz	"Canzone per un figlio"	7.73%	Eliminated

=== Fourth night ===
==== Big Artists section ====
During the fourth night, each artist still in competition in the Big Artists section dueted with a guest, performing a new version of the competing song. At the end of the night, a ranking was compiled by combining televoting with the votes determined by the Sanremo Festival Orchestra, and the bottom two artists—Chiara Civello and Matia Bazar—were eliminated.

Performances of the Big Artists on the fourth night
R/O	Artist	Song	Guest	Points (orchestra)	Televotes	Place
1	Noemi	"Sono solo parole"	Gaetano Curreri	14	4.92%	4
2	Pierdavide Carone & Lucio Dalla	"Nanì"	Gianluca Grignani	5	22.04%	6
3	Dolcenera	"Ci vediamo a casa"	Max Gazzè	7	3.88%	10
4	Gigi D'Alessio & Loredana Bertè	"Respirare"	Fargetta	15	13.45%	3
5	Chiara Civello	"Al posto del mondo"	Francesca Michielin	6	3.30%	12
6	Samuele Bersani	"Un pallone"	Paolo Rossi	9	3.03%	9
7	Eugenio Finardi	"E tu lo chiami Dio"	Peppe Servillo	8	3.76%	8
8	Nina Zilli	"Per sempre"	Giuliano Palma & the Bluebeaters	7	5.11%	7
9	Arisa	"La notte"	Mauro Ermanno Giovanardi	18	9.02%	1
10	Emma Marrone	"Non è l'inferno"	Alessandra Amoroso	12	22.49%	2
11	Matia Bazar	"Sei tu"	Platinette	8	2.28%	11
12	Francesco Renga	"La tua bellezza"	Scala & Kolacny Brothers	8	6.72%	5

Marlene Kuntz and Irene Fornaciari, eliminated during the previous night, would have performed with Samuel Umberto Romano and Davide Van De Sfroos, respectively.

==== Newcomers section ====
The final of the newcomers section was held on 17 February 2012. The four artists still in competition performed their songs, and a ranking was obtained by combining televoting with the votes determined by the Sanremo Festival Orchestra. The ranking was later changed by two different "Golden shares". The first one, received by Alessandro Casillo, was determined by votes expressed through Facebook, while the second one, received by Erica Mou, was obtained considering votes expressed by Italian radio stations. In both the "golden share" mechanisms, the most voted artist gained one slot in the previous ranking. At the end of the night, Alessandro Casillo was announced the winner of the contest.

Performances of the contestants of the Newcomers section on the fourth night
R/O	Artist	Song	Points (Orchestra)	Televotes	Points (Facebook golden share)	Points (Radios golden share)	Place
1	Alessandro Casillo	"È vero (che ci sei)"	20	51.50%	3,722	2	1
2	Iohosemprevoglia	"Incredibile"	18	19.24%	2,484	4	3
3	Marco Guazzone	"Guasto"	17	14.26%	1,323	10	4
4	Erica Mou	"Nella vasca da bagno del tempo"	17	15.00%	1,780	15	2

=== Fifth night ===
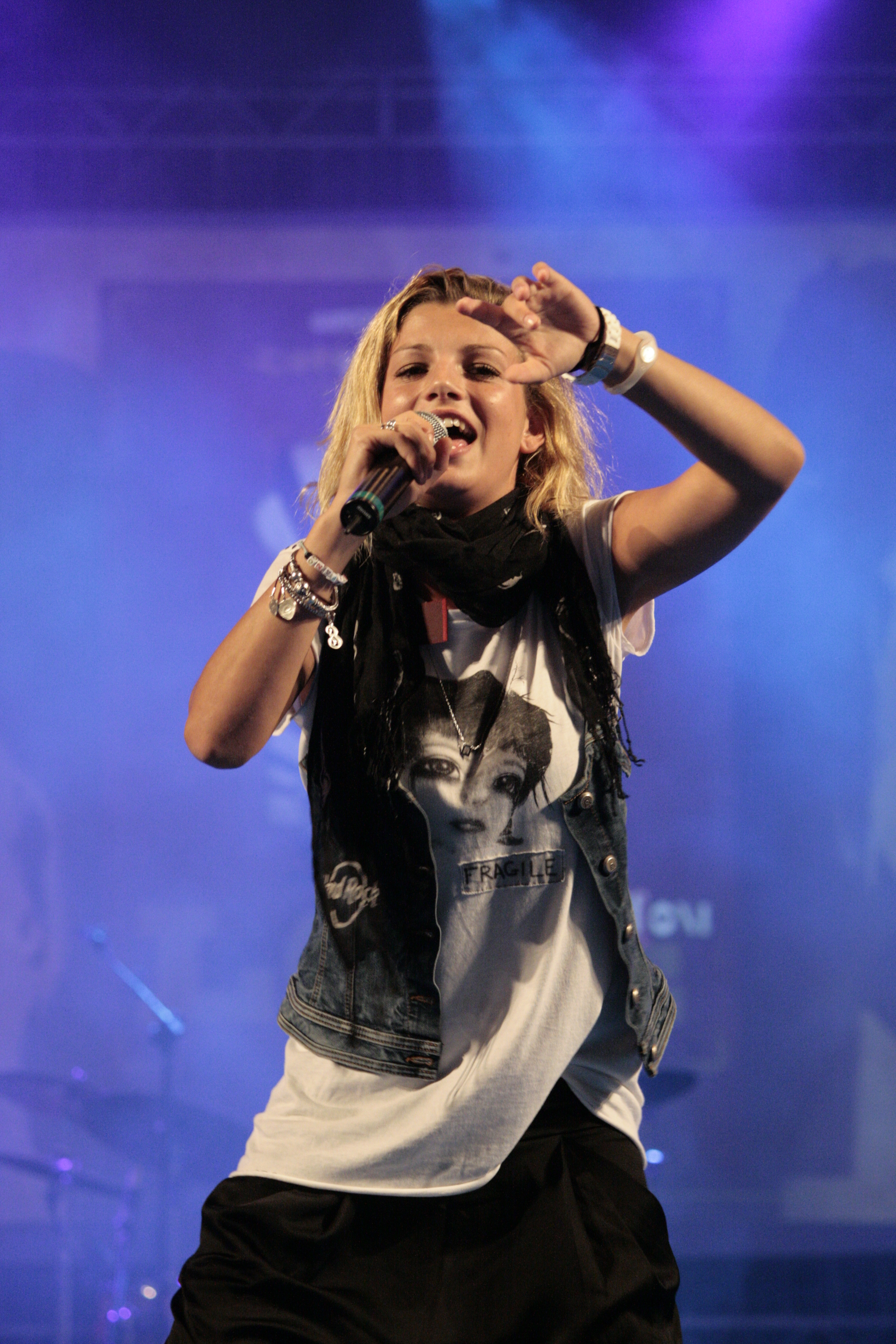
Emma Marrone came in first place at the contest with her song "Non è l'inferno"

==== First round ====
The final of the Big Artists section was held on 18 February 2012. During the first round, the ten artists still in competition performed their entries, and a ranking was obtained by combining televoting with the votes determined by the Sanremo Festival Orchestra. Each journalist in the press room also voted one of the competing artists, and Noemi, who received the most votes, obtained the "golden share", gaining three slot in the previous ranking. Therefore, she replaced Gigi D'Alessio and Loredana Bertè in the top three artists, and she was admitted to the second round of the final, together with Emma and Arisa.

Performances of the Big Artists on the first round of the final
R/O	Artist(s)	Song	Points (orchestra)	Televotes	Points (golden share)	Place
1	Nina Zilli	"Per sempre"	17	4.98%	2	7
2	Gigi D'Alessio & Loredana Bertè	"Respirare"	31	12.09%	5	4
3	Emma Marrone	"Non è l'inferno"	26	29.65%	7	3
4	Samuele Bersani	"Un pallone"	25	3.18%	0	9
5	Dolcenera	"Ci vediamo a casa"	17	5.59%	2	6
6	Pierdavide Carone & Lucio Dalla	"Nanì"	14	15.74%	9	5
7	Noemi	"Sono solo parole"	33	5.42%	50	1
8	Arisa	"La notte"	38	11.59%	9	2
9	Eugenio Finardi	"E tu lo chiami dio"	15	3.26%	3	10
10	Francesco Renga	"La tua bellezza"	13	8.50%	0	8

==== Second round ====
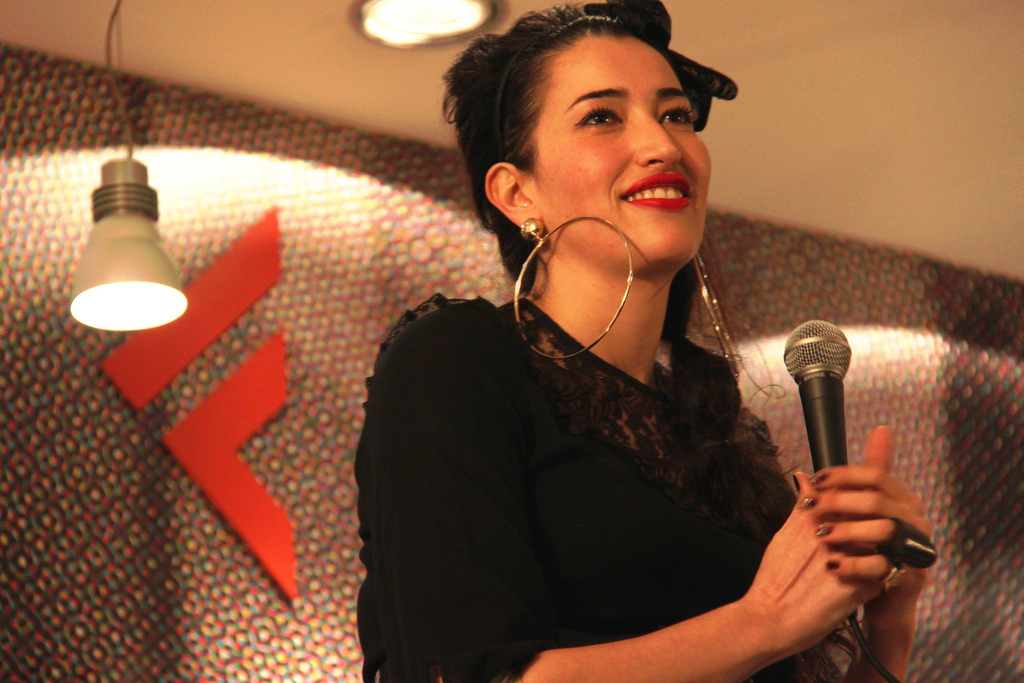
Nina Zilli was chosen by a specific jury as the entrant for Italy at the Eurovision Song Contest 2012

During the second round, the top three artists performed for the last time their entries, and the final ranking was determined by televoting only. Nina Zilli was also announced as Italy's entrant for Eurovision Song Contest 2012 despite not advancing towards this round. She was chosen by a specific jury among the participants.

Performances of the Big Artists on the second round of the final
Artist	Order	Song	Votes	Place
1	Noemi	"Sono solo parole"	14.84%	3
2	Emma Marrone	"Non è l'inferno"	49.63%	1
3	Arisa	"La notte"	35.53%	2

== Other awards ==
=== Critics Award "Mia Martini" ===
==== Big Artists section ====
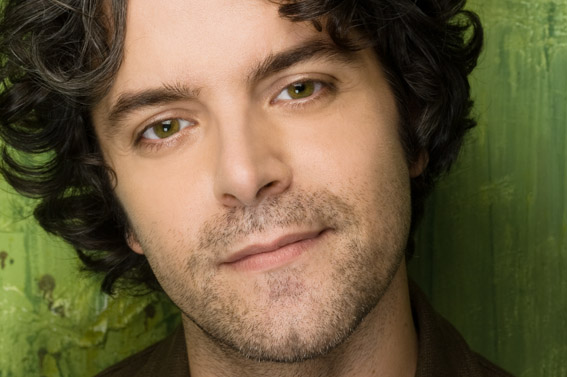
Samuele Bersani won the Critics Award in the Big Artists section for his entry "Un pallone".

Points received by the "Big Artists" for the Critics Award
Artist	Song	Points	Result
Samuele Bersani	"Un pallone"	21	Winner
Eugenio Finardi	"E tu lo chiami Dio"	20	Second place
Nina Zilli	"Per sempre"	12	Third place
Pierdavide Carone & Lucio Dalla	"Nanì"	10	Fourth place
Marlene Kuntz	"Canzone per un figlio"	8	Fifth place
Arisa	"La notte"	7	Sixth place
Noemi	"Sono solo parole"	7	Sixth place
Emma Marrone	"Non è l'inferno"	5	Eighth place
Francesco Renga	"La tua bellezza"	5	Eighth place
Dolcenera	"Ci vediamo a casa"	2	Tenth place
Irene Fornaciari	"Grande mistero"	2	Tenth place
Gigi D'Alessio & Loredana Bertè	"Respirare"	1	Twelfth place

==== Newcomers section ====
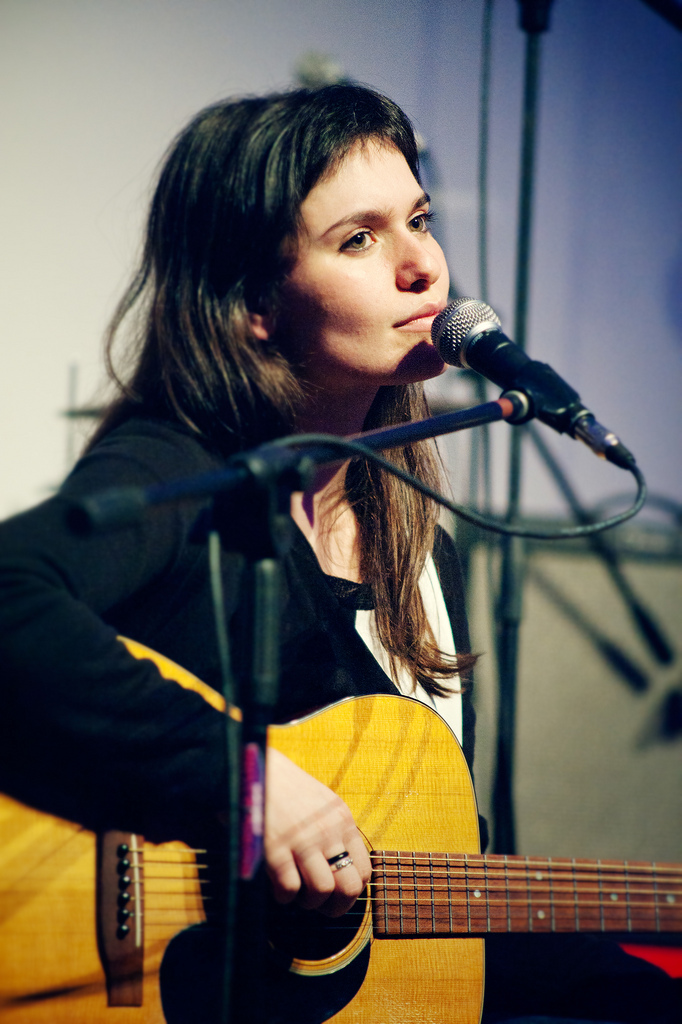
Erica Mou was the winner of the Critics' Award in the Newcomers section. She received the prize for her song "Nella vasca da bagno del tempo".

Points received by the newcomers for the Critics Award
Artist	Song	Points	Result
Erica Mou	"Nella vasca da bagno del tempo"	34	Winner
Marco Guazzone	"Guasto"	26	Second place
Celeste Gaia	"Carlo"	10	Third place
Alessandro Casillo	"È vero (che ci sei)"	9	Fourth place
Giordana Angi	"Incognita poesia"	7	Fifth place
Bidiel	"Sono un errore"	5	Sixth place
Iohosemprevoglia	"Incredibile"	5	Sixth place
Giulia Anania	"La mail che non ti ho scritto"	2	Eighth place

=== Press, Radio & TV Award ===
==== Big Artists section ====
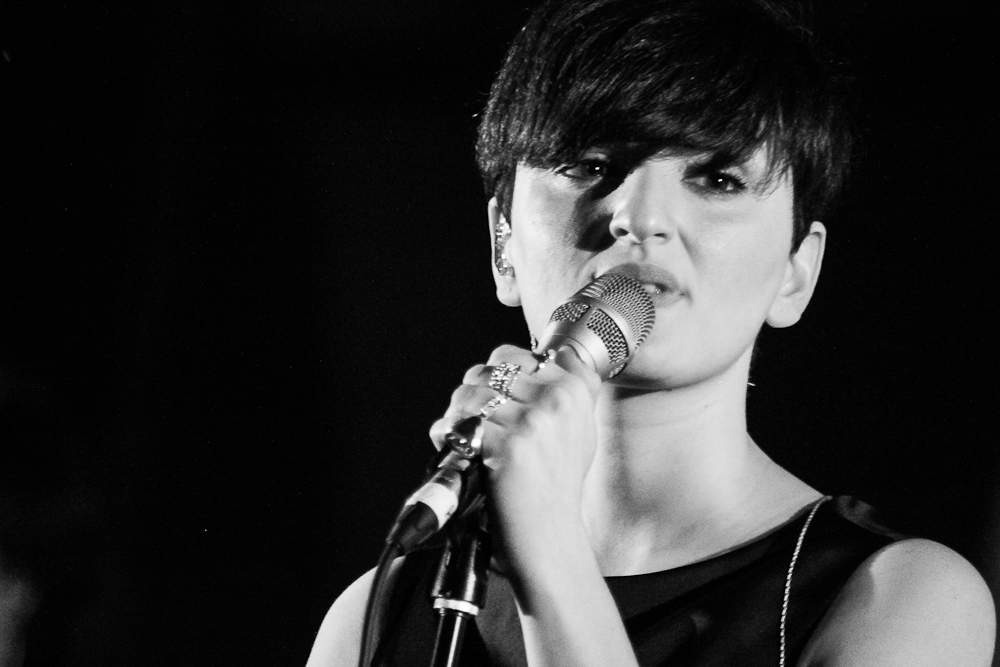
Arisa received the Press, Radio & TV Award in the Big Artists section, with her song "La notte".

Points received by the "Big Artists" for the Press, Radio & TV Award
Artist	Song	Points	Result
Arisa	"La notte"	11	Winner
Nina Zilli	"Per sempre"	10	Second place
Eugenio Finardi	"E tu lo chiami Dio"	9	Third place
Pierdavide Carone & Lucio Dalla	"Nanì"	8	Fourth place
Dolcenera	"Ci vediamo a casa"	7	Fifth place
Noemi	"Sono solo parole"	7	Fifth place
Gigi D'Alessio & Loredana Bertè	"Respirare"	3	Sixth place
Samuele Bersani	"Un pallone"	3	Sixth place
Marlene Kuntz	"Canzone per un figlio"	3	Sixth place
Francesco Renga	"La tua bellezza"	2	Tenth place
Emma Marrone	"Non è l'inferno"	2	Tenth place

==== Newcomers section ====
Points received by the newcomers for the Press, Radio & TV Award
Artist	Song	Points	Result
Erica Mou	"Nella vasca da bagno del tempo"	30	Winner
Marco Guazzone	"Guasto"	16	Second place
Alessandro Casillo	"È vero (che ci sei)"	9	Third place
Celeste Gaia	"Carlo"	7	Fourth place
Iohosemprevoglia	"Incredibile"	2	Fifth place
Giordana Angi	"Incognita poesia"	1	Sixth place

== Ratings ==
Episode	Date	Viewers	Share
Night 1	14 February 2012	12,700,000	49.55%
Night 2	15 February 2012	9,200,000	39.27%
Night 3	16 February 2012	10,540,000	47.46%
Night 4	17 February 2012	9,931,000	41.97%
Night 5	18 February 2012	13,287,000	57.43%

== See also ==
- Sanremo Music Festival
- Italy in the Eurovision Song Contest 2012
