= L'amore è femmina =

Studio album by Nina Zilli
- Released: February 15, 2012
- Recorded: 2011
- Genre: R&B; pop
- Length: 39:25
- Language: Italian
- Label: Universal
- Producer: Nina Zilli; Michele Canova; Davide Tagliapietra; Pino "Pinaxa" Pischetola

Nina Zilli chronology
Sempre lontano (2010)	L'amore è femmina (2012)	Frasi & fumo (2015)

Singles from L'amore è femmina
- 1. "Per sempre" Released: 15 February 2012; 2. "L'amore è femmina" Released: 11 April 2012; 3. "Per le strade" Released: 12 July 2012; 4. "Una notte" Released: 30 November 2012

Professional ratings
Review scores
Source	Rating
Rockol.it	3/5 stars
Rolling Stone Italia	4/5 stars

L'amore è femmina (Italian pronunciation: [laˈmoːre ɛ fˈfemmina]; English: "Love is female") is the second studio album by Italian singer Nina Zilli. It was released on 15 February 2012 through Universal Music Group, following her participation in the 62nd Sanremo Music Festival with the song "Per sempre", chosen as the lead single from the album. The second single and title track, "L'amore è femmina", was chosen as the official song entry for Italy at the Eurovision Song Contest 2012, which was held in Baku, Azerbaijan.

In November 2012 the album was certified gold by the Federation of the Italian Music Industry for domestic sales exceeding 30,000 units.

== Track listing ==
L'amore è femmina – Standard track listing
No.	Title	Writer(s)	Length
1.	"Per le strade"	Luigi De Crescenzo	3:37
2.	"Per sempre"	Maria Chiara Fraschetta; Roberto Casalino	3:25
3.	"Una notte"	Fraschetta	3:27
4.	"L'inverno all'improvviso"	Fraschetta	3:25
5.	"La felicità"	Diego Mancino	3:41
6.	"L'amore è femmina"	Fraschetta; Christian Rabb; Kristoffer Sjokvist; Frida Molander; Charlie Mason	2:59
7.	"Piangono le viole"	Fraschetta; Davide Tagliapietra	3:29
8.	"Non qui"	Fraschetta	2:55
9.	"La casa sull'albero"	Alessandra Flora; Francesco Morettini; Marco Ciappelli; Luca Angelosanti	3:05
10.	"Anna"	Fraschetta	3:09
11.	"Un'altra estate"	Carmen Consoli; Fraschetta	3:03
12.	"Lasciatemi dormire"	Fraschetta	3:03

L'amore è femmina – iTunes edition bonus track
No.	Title	Length
13.	"L'amore è femmina (Out of Love)" (English version)	3:00

== Personnel ==
Credits for L'amore è femmina adapted from the album liner notes.

Music credits

- Biagio Antonacci - drums
- Alberto Boliettieri - trombone, bass trombone
- Gareth Brown - drums
- Simone D'Eusanio - strings
- Riccardo Jeeba Gibertini - trumpet, French horn
- Christian "Noochie" Rigano - piano, Fender Rhodes, ARP, solina, Hammond organ, synth, string arrangements
- Davide Tagliapietra - drums, bass, guitars, string arrangements
- Marco Zaghi - tenor sax, flutes
- Nina Zilli - voice, string arrangements

Production

- Michele Canova - producer
- Fabrizio Giannini - executive producer
- Davide Tagliapietra - producer, arrangements
- Pino "Pinaxa" Pischetola - producer, arrangements, mixing
- Nina Zilli - producer, arrangements
- Patrizio "Pat" Simonini - assistant
- Antonio Baglio - mastering

== Charts ==
=== Weekly charts ===
Chart (2012)	Peak position
Italian Albums Chart	11

=== Year-end charts ===
Chart (2012)	Position
Italian Albums Chart	44
