= Frasi & fumo =

Studio album by Nina Zilli
- Released: 12 February 2015
- Recorded: 2014
- Genre: Pop; neo soul
- Length: 50:06
- Label: Universal
- Producer: Fabrizio Giannini; Mauro Pagani; Nina Zilli

Nina Zilli chronology
L'amore è femmina (2012)	Frasi & fumo (2015)	Modern Art (2017)

Singles from Frasi & fumo
- 1. "Sola" Released: 12 February 2015; 2. "#RLL (Riprenditi le lacrime)" Released: 3 April 2015

Frasi & fumo is the third studio album by Italian singer Nina Zilli. It was released in Italy on 12 February 2015 through Universal Music. The album peaked at number 15 on the Italian Albums Chart.

== Singles ==
"Sola" was released as the lead single on 12 February 2015. The song peaked at number 50 on the Italian Singles Chart. The song was Zilli's entry for the Sanremo Music Festival 2015, the 65th edition of Italy's musical festival which doubles also as a selection of the act for Eurovision Song Contest. "#RLL (Riprenditi le lacrime)" was released as the second single on 3 April 2015.

== Track listing ==
Credits adapted from Tidal.

Frasi & fumo – Standard track listing
No.	Title	Writer(s)	Length
1.	"Intro (Cirronembi)"	Maria Chiara Fraschetta; Giovanni Pellino	3:18
2.	"Frasi & fumo"	Fraschetta; Pellino	3:58
3.	"Luna spenta"	Fraschetta; Pellino	3:22
4.	"Sola"	Fraschetta	2:49
5.	"#RLL (Riprenditi le lacrime)"	Fraschetta; Pellino; Alessandra Flora; Marco Ciappelli	3:21
6.	"Cadevo piano"	Fraschetta; Obi Ebele; Uche Ebele	3:50
7.	"Lei dice"	Fraschetta; Pellino	3:21
8.	"Una breve vacanza"	Giuseppe Rinaldi; Tony Canto	3:36
9.	"Schema libero" (featuring Neffa)	Fraschetta; Pellino	2:51
10.	"Fra il divano e le nuvole"	Fraschetta; Pellino	2:56
11.	"Se bruciasse la città" (originally performed by Massimo Ranieri)	Giancarlo Bigazzi; Enrico Polito; Gaetano Savio	2:50
12.	"Dicembre"	Fraschetta; Pellino	3:05
13.	"Unico re"	Frachetta; Rinaldi	3:11
14.	"Dormi, dormi"	Fraschetta; Pellino	3:49

Frasi & fumo – iTunes edition bonus track
No.	Title	Writer(s)	Length
15.	"Malefa"	Fraschetta	3:35

== Charts ==
Chart (2015)	Peak position
Italian Albums (FIMI)	15

== Release history ==
Region	Date	Format	Label
Italy	12 February 2015	Digital download	Universal Music
