= Pierdavide Carone =

Italian singer-songwriter (born 1988)

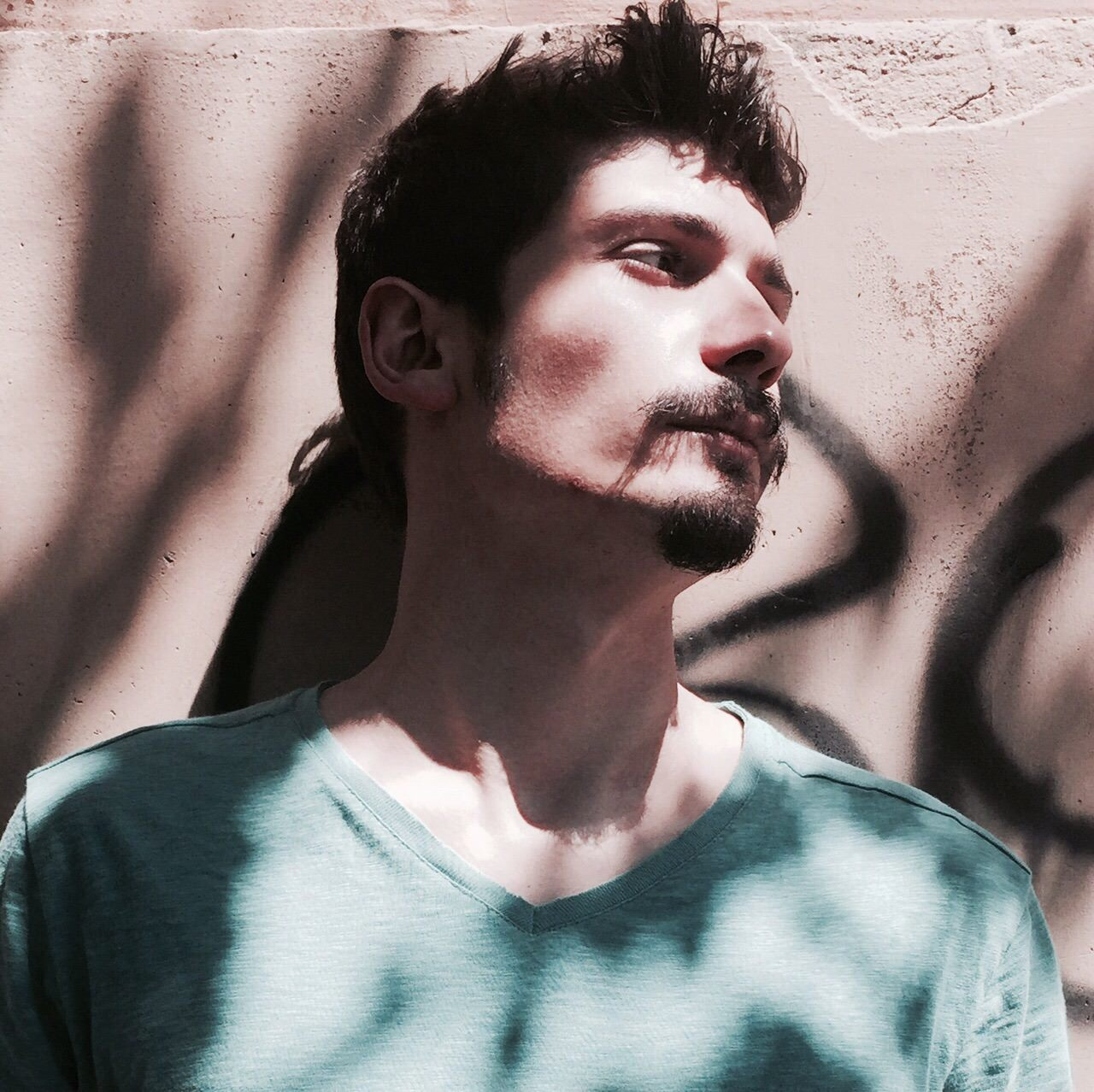
- Pierdavide Carone in 2015

Background information
- Born: 30 June 1988 (age 38); Rome, Italy
- Genres: Pop; pop rock
- Occupations: Singer; songwriter; composer
- Instruments: Vocals; guitar; piano
- Years active: 2009–present
- Labels: Sony Music (2010-2016); Artist First (2017-2021)
- Website: pierdavidecaroneofficial.it

Pierdavide Carone (born 30 June 1988) is an Italian singer-songwriter.

== Life and career ==
=== Amici and the first album Una Canzone Pop ===
He was a contestant of the ninth edition of the Italian popular talent show Amici di Maria De Filippi; he reached the finals and finished in third place. He also won the critics award. He signed a contract with Sony Music Entertainment and during the final of the show he won the prize of journalistic criticism of the value of 50,000 euros. His debut album Una Canzone Pop peaking the No. 1 in the Italian album chart and has been certified double platinum in Italy. Even his first single "Di Notte" reached No. 1 in Italy. He is also the author of the song "Per tutte le volte che...", performed by Valerio Scanu, who won the Sanremo Festival 2010. He also released the book I sogni fanno rima which was an editorial success. On July, he released the second single from the album: Mi piaci...ma non troppo.

=== Second album: Distrattamente ===
On 29 October 2010 the single La prima volta was released. It was the lead single from his second album Distrattamente, released the following 23 November. The album reached #13 in the Italian charts. He wrote the song "Guardando Verso il Mare" for Matteo Macchioni (released in Macchioni's first album in 2011). Pierdavide is currently touring Italy with his "Distrattamente Tour". On July and August, Carone had opened several concerts of Franco Battiato. His single, "Volo a Rio" was released on 16 September 2011. The song was taken from the concept album dedicated to Rio, a 2011 animated film by 20th Century Fox and Blue Sky Studios.

=== Sanremo Music Festival 2012 and the third album ===
Carone participated in the 62nd edition of the Sanremo Music Festival alongside Lucio Dalla. They performed the song Nanì, which they wrote together. Shortly afterward, Carone released a new album named Nanì e altri racconti. Twelve days after the Sanremo festival, Lucio Dalla died. That same year, 2012, Carone took part in the eleventh edition of Amici, in the "Big" category. On 6 April 2012 Sony Music Italy announced the second single from Nanì e altri racconti: "Basta così".

== Discography ==
=== Albums ===
Year	Name	Charts	Certification
Year	Name	IT	IT
2010	Una Canzone Pop: Released: 30 March 2010; Label: Sony Music; Formats: CD, digital download	1	2xPlatinum
2010	Distrattamente: Released: 23 November 2010; Label: Sony Music; Formats: CD, digital download	13	-
2012	Nanì e altri racconti: Released: 15 February 2012; Label: Sony Music; Formats: CD, digital download	12	-

=== Singles ===
Year	Title	Charts	Album
Year	Title	IT	Album
2010	Di Notte	1	Una Canzone Pop
2010	Mi piaci...ma non-troppo	-	Una Canzone Pop
2010	La prima volta	-	Distrattamente
2011	Dammela... la mano	-	Distrattamente
2011	Volo a Rio	-	single
2012	Nanì	11	Nanì e altri racconti
2012	Basta così	30	Nanì e altri racconti
2012	Tra il male e Dio	-	Nanì e altri racconti

== Awards and nominations ==
Year	Award	Category	Work	Result
2010	Amici di Maria De Filippi	Criticism prize	Himself	Won
2010	Double Platinum certification	–	Una Canzone Pop	Won
2010	Wind Music Awards	Cd Multiplatinum	Una Canzone Pop	Won
2010	Gold certification	–	Di Notte	Won
2011	TRL Awards	Best talent show artist	Himself	Nominated
2011	Crisalide Award	–	Himself	Won
2012	Sanremo Music Festival	Artists	Nanì	5th place
