= Modern Art (Nina Zilli album) =

Studio album by Nina Zilli
- Released: 1 September 2017
- Genre: Pop
- Length: 40:18
- Label: Universal
- Producer: Michele Canova; Luca Scarpa

Nina Zilli chronology
Frasi & fumo (2015)	Modern Art (2017)

Singles from Modern Art
- 1. "Mi hai fatto fare tardi" Released: 26 May 2017; 2. "Domani arriverà (Modern Art)" Released: 29 September 2017; 3. "Senza appartenere" Released: 6 February 2018; 4. "1xUnattimo" Released: 16 March 2018; 5. "Ti amo mi uccidi" Released: 22 June 2018

Modern Art is the fourth studio album by Italian singer-songwriter Nina Zilli. It was released on 1 September 2017 through Universal Music Italy. The album peaked at number 17 on the Italian Albums Chart.

== Singles ==
"Mi hai fatto fare tardi" was released as the lead single from the album on 26 May 2017. "Domani arriverà (Modern Art)" was released as the second single from the album on 29 September 2017. "Senza appartenere" was released as the third single from the album on 6 February 2018. The song peaked at number 74 on the Italian Singles Chart. The song was Zilli's entry for the Sanremo Music Festival 2018, the 68th edition of Italy's musical festival which doubles also as a selection of the act for Eurovision Song Contest. "1xUnattimo" was released as the fourth single from the album on 16 March 2018. "Ti amo mi uccidi" was released as the fifth single from the album on 22 June 2018.

== Track listing ==
Credits adapted from Tidal.

No.	Title	Writer(s)	Producer(s)	Length
1.	"Senza appartenere"	Maria Chiara Fraschetta; Antonio Iammarino; Giordana Angi	Luca Scarpa	3:16
2.	"Domani arriverà (Modern Art)"	Fraschetta; Michele Canova Iorfida	Michele Canova	2:53
3.	"Ti amo mi uccidi"	Fraschetta	Canova	3:05
4.	"1xUnattimo"	Fraschetta; Obi Ebele; Uche Ebele	Canova	3:32
5.	"Mi hai fatto fare tardi"	Fraschetta; Edoardo D'Erme; Tommaso Paradiso; Dario Faini	Canova	3:12
6.	"Il punto in cui tornare"	Fraschetta; Alessandra Flora; Piero Romitelli; Canova	Canova	3:11
7.	"Notte di luglio"	Fraschetta; O. Ebele; U. Ebele	Canova	2:56
8.	"Butti giù" (featuring J-Ax)	Fraschetta; Alessandro Aleotti; O. Ebele; U. Ebele	Canova	3:55
9.	"Il mio posto qual è" (originally performed by Ornella Vanoni)	Sergio Bardotti; Franco Califano; Carlos Pes; Gian Franco Reverberi	Canova	2:44
10.	"IgPF"	Fraschetta; Daniel Nitt; Canova	Canova	2:58
11.	"Sei nell'aria"	Fraschetta; O. Ebele; U. Ebele	Canova	3:14
12.	"Per un niente"	Fraschetta; Emilio Munda; Romitelli	Canova	3:22
13.	"1XUnattimo" (Unplugged)	Fraschetta; O. Ebele; U. Ebele	Canova	3:32
14.	"Come un miracolo"	Fraschetta	Canova	5:10

== Charts ==
Chart (2017)	Peak position
Italian Albums (FIMI)	17

== Release history ==
Region	Date	Format	Label
Italy	1 September 2017	Digital download	Universal Music
