= Alessandro Casillo =

- Born: Alessandro Andrea Casillo; 15 June 1996 (age 30); Assago, Italy.
- Genre: Pop rock
- Occupation: Singer
- Instrument: Vocal
- Years active: 2010–present
- Label: RTI Music
- Website: alessandrocasillo.it

Alessandro Andrea Casillo (born 15 June 1996) is an Italian singer, launched by the talent show Io Canto. In 2012 he won the Sixty-second edition of the Sanremo Music Festival in the Youth category, with the song È vero (che ci sei).

== Career ==
In 2010, at the age of 14, Casillo participated in the television program Io Canto hosted by Gerry Scotti. During the program he became part of the boy band group Gimme Five.

On 31 May 2011 he released his first EP titled Raccontami chi sei, which was produced by GPM, RTI Music. The EP contains five songs written his brothers Matteo, Emiliano and Maurizio Bassi. One of the songs of the EP was premiered on May 28 at the Wind Music Awards.

He was a SanremoSocial winner of the Sanremo Music Festival 2012, having sung È vero (che ci sei) (English: It is true (you're there)). He was unable to attend the award ceremony, because according to a legislative degree (n. 345), minors cannot work in television after midnight. He received the prize then the next day, during the final show.

On 15 February 2012 his debut album È vero was released. It contains nine original songs and a cover of Baltimora'sTarzan Boy.

On 5 May 2012 Casillo participated in the TRL Awards 2012. During the summer of 2012 he was the opening act for Noemi's RossoNoemi concert tour.

In January 2014 Casillo released his new album "#ALE".

On 17 May 2019 Casillo released his new album "XVII".

== Discography ==
=== Albums ===
Year	Album
2012	È vero
2014	#Ale
2019	XVII

=== Singles ===
Anno	Single
2012	È vero (che ci sei)
2012	Mai
2012	Si lo so
2013	Io scelgo te
2014	Niente da perdere

=== EP ===
Year	Album
2011	Raccontami chi sei
