= Per sempre (Nina Zilli song) =

Single by Nina Zilli

from the album L'amore è femmina
- Released: 15 February 2012
- Genre: Orchestral pop
- Length: 3:25
- Label: Universal Music Italy
- Songwriters: Maria Chiara Fraschetta; Roberto Casalino
- Producers: Michele Canova; Nina Zilli

Nina Zilli singles chronology
"Bacio d'a(d)dio" (2010)	"Per sempre" (2012)	"L'amore è femmina" (2012)

Music video
- "Per sempre" on YouTube

"Per sempre" (Italian pronunciation: [per ˈsɛmpre]; English: "Forever") is a song co-written, recorded and produced by Italian singer Nina Zilli. It was released on 15 February 2012 as the lead single from her second studio album L'amore è femmina.

The song competed in the "Big Artists" section of the Sanremo Music Festival 2012, placing seventh in a field of fourteen entries. During the contest, Zilli and her entry were also chosen by a specific jury to represent Italy in the Eurovision Song Contest 2012. It was later announced that a change had occurred and that Zilli's competing song at Eurovision would be "L'amore è femmina" instead.

The song peaked at number five on the Italian Singles Chart and it was certified platinum for domestic downloads exceeding 30,000 units.

== Background ==
The song was composed by Zilli herself, together with popular Italian songwriter Roberto Casalino. It is a traditional ballad, inspired by the style of 1960s' popular Italian female singers such as Mina, who also influenced Zilli's look on stage during the Sanremo Music Festival.

The lyrics of the song refer to the end of a lovestory, with Zilli setting aside her pride while promising eternal love and asking her ex-partner to come back to her.

== Sanremo Music Festival ==
On 15 January 2012, during the TV programme L'arena, Gianni Morandi announced the complete list of songs competing in the "Big Artists" section of the Sanremo Music Festival 2012, also including Nina Zilli's "Per sempre". Zilli performed the song for the first time on 14 February 2012, during the first night of the festival. Following a technical problem occurred in the voting process, all the songs were admitted to the second night of the show. The song was performed again the following day, being admitted to the semi-final, which was held on 17 February 2012. During the fourth night, Zilli sang the track in a duet with Giuliano Palma, gaining access to the final, during which she placed seventh in the overall ranking. During all Zilli's performances, the Sanremo Festival Orchestra was conducted by Beppe Vessicchio.

On the last night of the show, Ell & Nikki, winners of the Eurovision Song Contest 2011, also announced that Zilli was chosen by a specific jury to represent Italy in the Eurovision Song Contest 2012. On 3 March 2012, Zilli confirmed the song as the Italian entry to the contest, also announcing that it will be re-recorded in a half-English version. However, on 13 March 2012, it was announced that Zilli would instead sing "L'amore è femmina" at Eurovision.

== Music video ==
The music video for the song was directed by Duccio Forzano.

== Charts ==
=== Weekly charts ===
Weekly chart performance for "Per sempre"
Chart (2012)	Peak position
Italy (FIMI)	5

=== Year-end charts ===
Year-end chart performance for "Per sempre"
Chart (2012)	Rank
Italy (FIMI)	52
