= Nina Zilli (EP) =

EP by Nina Zilli
- Released: 11 September 2009
- Recorded: 2009
- Genre: Soul; R&B; pop
- Length: 25:30
- Label: Universal Music

Nina Zilli chronology
Nina Zilli (2009)	Sempre lontano (2010)

Singles from Nina Zilli
- 1. "50mila" Released: 31 July 2009; 2. "L'inferno" Released: 25 September 2009

Nina Zilli is an extended play released by Italian singer–songwriter Nina Zilli. It was released through the Universal Music on 19 September 2009, and contained seven songs that would eventually appear on Zilli's debut studio album Sempre lontano. Nina Zilli peaked at number 54 at the Italian Albums Chart.

== Singles ==
"50mila", a duet with Giuliano Palma, was released on 30 July 2009, and enjoyed success at Italian radio stations. Zilli's solo version was featured in 2010 film Loose Cannons by Ferzan Özpetek, and in the video game Pro Evolution Soccer 2011. "L'inferno" was released in September 2009 to modest reception. It was also featured in the video game Pro Evolution Soccer 2011. "L'amore verrà", an Italian–language cover of "You Can't Hurry Love" by The Supremes, was released later in 2009.

== Track listing ==
No.	Title	Writer(s)	Length
1.	"50mila (feat. Guiliano Palma)"	Nina Zilli	2:55
2.	"L'inferno"	Nina Zilli	2:38
3.	"Come il sole"	Nina Zilli	3:37
4.	"Tutto bene"	Nina Zilli	2:47
5.	"Penelope (feat. Smoke)"	Nina Zilli	3:29
6.	"L'amore verrà"	Brian Holland, Lamont Dozier	3:16
7.	"Bellissimo"	Nina Zilli	3:13
8.	"No Pressure"	Giancarlo Provasi, Nina Zilli	3:29

== Chart positions ==
Chart	Peak position
Italy (Italian Albums Chart)	54
