= Sempre lontano =

Studio album by Nina Zilli
- Released: 19 February 2010
- Recorded: 2009–2010
- Genre: Soul; R&B; reggae
- Length: 37:30
- Label: Universal
- Producer: Carlo Ubaldo Rossi

Nina Zilli chronology
Nina Zilli (2009)	Sempre lontano (2010)	L'amore è femmina (2012)

Singles from Sempre lontano
- 1. "L'uomo che amava le donne" Released: 12 February 2010; 2. "Bacio d'a(d)dio" Released: 5 November 2010

Sempre lontano (Italian for 'Always Away') is the debut studio album by Italian singer Nina Zilli. The album was released through the Universal Music on 19 February 2010. It peaked at number five at the Italian Albums Chart, and was certified platinum by the Federation of the Italian Music Industry.

== Album information ==
Prior to the release of Sempre lontano, Zilli released her extended play Nina Zilli, which peaked at number 54 at the Italian Albums Chart. It contained seven tracks, included singles "50mila", "L'inferno" and "L'amore verrà", that would later appear on Sempre lontano. Sempre lontano was released on 19 February 2010. The special edition of the album was released on 30 November. Sempre lontano was certified platinum in Italy, for domestic sales exceeding 60,000 units.

== Promotion and reception ==
=== Singles ===
"L'uomo che amava le donne" was released on 12 February 2010, and it was Zilli's entry for the 60th Sanremo Music Festival. The song was performed for the first time on 18 February 2010 and it was admitted to the final, but did not win. During the competition, "L'uomo che amava le donne" earned the Mia Martini Critics' Choice Award and the Press, Radio and Television Award. It was later certified gold by the FIMI. "Bacio d'a(d)dio" was released on 5 November 2009 on Sempre lontano Special Edition. Zilli's outfit in the music video was designed by Vivienne Westwood.

=== Critical response ===
Professional ratings
Review scores
Source	Rating
Allmusic	3.5/5 stars
Musica e dischi	4/5 stars

Jason Birchmeier of the Allmusic.com reviewed the album positively, describing Zilli as a "feel–good soul-pop singer with a retro style that harks back to the '60s" and comparing her to Amy Winehouse.

=== Chart performance ===
Sempre lontano spent sixty weeks in the Italian Albums Chart. In its first week, it entered the chart at number 34. The album reached its highest position, number five, on 22 March 2010. Sempre lontano dropped out from the chart in its forty-first week, but it returned a week later at number 59. It would eventually drop out after being charted at number 100 in the sixtieth week.

== Track listing ==
Sempre lontano – Standard track listing
No.	Title	Writer(s)	Length
1.	"50mila" (featuring Guiliano Palma)	Maria Chiara Fraschetta	2:55
2.	"Il paradiso"	Fraschetta	3:00
3.	"L'uomo che amava le donne"	Fraschetta	2:41
4.	"L'inferno"	Fraschetta	2:38
5.	"Penelope" (featuring Smoke)	Fraschetta	3:29
6.	"L'amore verrà (You Can't Hurry Love)"	Brian Holland; Eddie Holland; Lamont Dozier	3:16
7.	"Bacio d'a(d)dio"	Fraschetta	2:54
8.	"C'era una volta"	Fraschetta	3:23
9.	"Come il sole"	Fraschetta	3:37
10.	"Tutto bene"	Fraschetta	2:47
11.	"No Pressure"	Alberto Provasi; Fraschetta	3:29
12.	"Bellissimo"	Fraschetta	3:13

Sempre lontano – iTunes bonus track
No.	Title	Writer(s)	Length
13.	"50mila" (Loose Cannons version)	Fraschetta	3:00

== Charts and certifications ==
=== Peak positions ===
Chart	Peak position
Italy (Italian Albums Chart)	5

=== Sales and certifications ===
Region	Certification	Sales and shipments
Italy (FIMI)	Platinum	60,000+
