= Nina Zilli =

Italian singer-songwriter

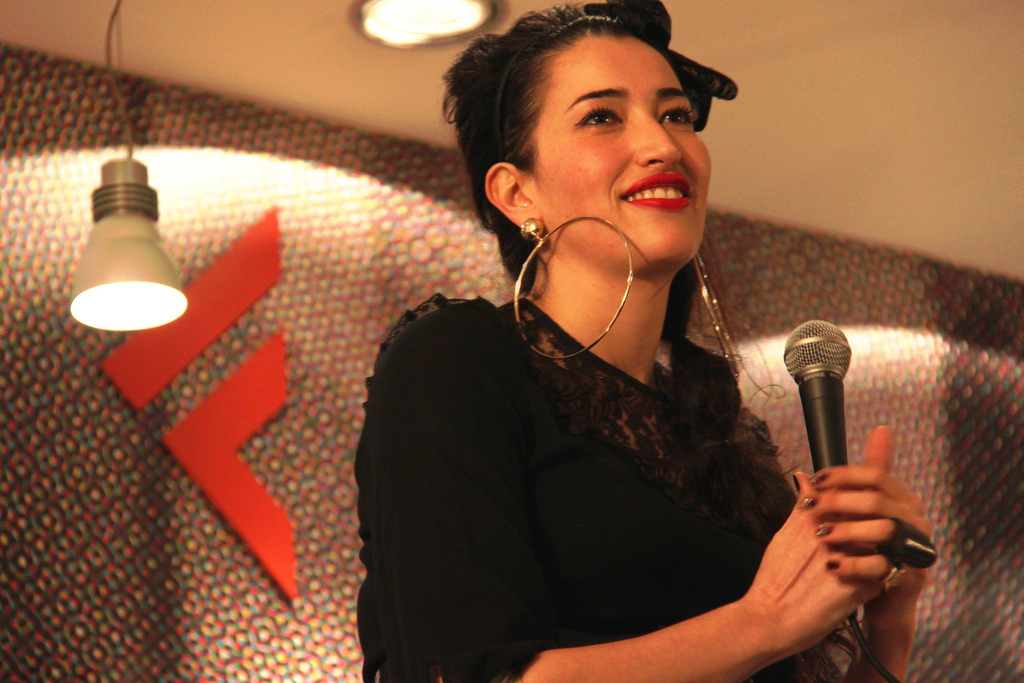
- Nina Zilli at the presentation of her first album Sempre lontano in 2010

Background information
- Born: Maria Chiara Fraschetta; 2 February 1980 (age 46); Piacenza, Italy
- Genres: Pop; R&B; soul; reggae
- Occupations: Singer; songwriter
- Years active: 2000–present
- Label: Universal
- Website: ninazilli.com

Maria Chiara Fraschetta (born 2 February 1980), better known by her stage name Nina Zilli (pronounced [ˈniːna dˈdzilli]), is an Italian singer-songwriter. After releasing her debut single "50mila", she achieved commercial success with the album Sempre lontano, released after participating in the newcomers' section of the Sanremo Music Festival 2010.

During the Sanremo Music Festival 2012, Zilli was chosen to represent Italy in the Eurovision Song Contest 2012 in Baku, Azerbaijan, where she placed 9th with the song "L'amore è femmina (Out of Love)", included in her second studio album. Zilli returned to the Sanremo Music Festival in 2015, and competed with the song "Sola" from her upcoming album, Frasi&Fumo. She also served as a judge in the Italian talent television series Italia's Got Talent from 2015 to 2017.

== Biography ==
=== Childhood and early beginnings ===
Maria Chiara Fraschetta was born on 2 February 1980 in Piacenza to a father from Emilia-Romagna and a mother from Apulia, and grew up in Gossolengo, 9 km (5.5 mi) southwest of Piacenza.

After moving to Ireland, she started performing live and, at the age of thirteen, she started studying opera singing at the conservatory.

In 1997 she founded her first band, The Jerks. After completing high school at the Liceo Scientifico Respighi in Piacenza, she spent two years in the United States, living in Chicago and New York.

=== TV career and the band Chiara e gli Scuri ===
Between 2000 and 2001 she co-presented Red Ronnie's TV show Roxy Bar, broadcast in Italy by TMC2. In 2001 she also debuted as a VJ for MTV Italy. Meanwhile she obtained a recording contract with her new band, Chiara e gli Scuri, founded in 2000. In 2001 the band released the single "Tutti al mare". They also started working on an album, but it was never released, due to some disagreements with the recording label.

During the same years, Zilli started her academic studies, later graduating in Public Relations from the IULM University of Milan.

=== Debut EP Nina Zilli ===
In 2009, she chose the stage name Nina Zilli, combining her mother's surname with Nina Simone's first name. Zilli released her debut single, "50mila", on 28 July 2009. The song features vocals by Giuliano Palma, though a Nina only version was later included in the soundtrack of Ferzan Özpetek's film Loose Cannons.

Nina Zilli's self-titled debut extended play, Nina Zilli, was released by Universal Music on 11 September 2011. The EP peaked at number 54 on the Italian Albums Chart, and it also spawned the singles "L'inferno", released in September 2009, and "L'amore verrà", an Italian-language cover of The Supremes "You Can't Hurry Love".

=== Sanremo Music Festival 2010 and Sempre Lontano ===
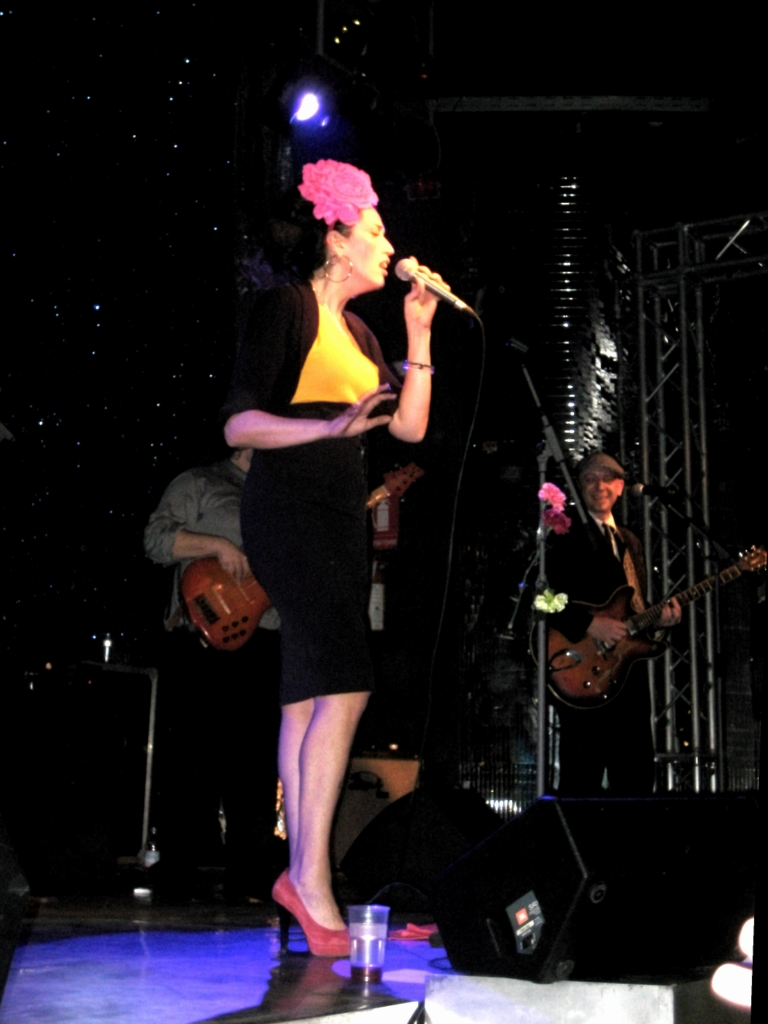
Nina Zilli in concert in 2009

On 12 January 2010, it was announced that Nina Zilli was one of the winners of the contest Sanremo New Generation, allowing her to participate in the newcomers section of the 60th Sanremo Music Festival. Zilli's entry, "L'uomo che amava le donne", was performed for the first time on 18 February 2010, and it was admitted to the final, later won by Tony Maiello's "Il linguaggio della resa". During the competition, Zilli received the Critics' Award "Mia Martini" and the Press, Radio & TV Award. The single was certified gold by the Federation of the Italian Music Industry and it was included in Zilli's debut album, Sempre lontano, released on 19 February 2010. A special edition of the album was released on 30 November 2010, together with the single "Bacio d'a(d)dio". On 18 February 2011, the album was certified platinum in Italy, for domestic sales exceeding 60,000 copies.

In February 2011, she received two nominations at the 2011 TRL Awards in the categories Best Look and Italians Do It Better. Zilli was also the presenter of the night, broadcast by MTV Italy on 20 April 2011. In March 2011, Sempre lontano was also released in Spain.

=== Sanremo Music Festival 2012, L'amore è Femmina and Eurovision Song Contest ===
In January 2012, Zilli was chosen as one of the participants in the Big Artists section of the 62nd Sanremo Music Festival, performing the song "Per sempre". During the competition, Zilli also performed a cover of Mina's "Grande grande grande", in a duet with British singer Skye Edwards. On the final of the show, she was chosen by a specific jury as the Italian entry to the Eurovision Song Contest 2012.

Zilli's second studio album, L'amore è femmina, was released on 15 February 2012. In March of the same year, she co-presented the show Panariello non esiste, created by Italian comedian Giorgio Panariello and broadcast by Canale 5.

Zilli represented Italy in the Eurovision Song Contest 2012 with the song "L'amore è femmina (Out of Love)". As Italy is one of the "Big Five" who provide the most financial funding into the contest she was automatically allocated in the final. After scoring 101 points, she placed in 9th place.

=== Italia's Got Talent and Frasi & fumo ===
Zilli was a judge on Italia's Got Talent from 2015 to 2017, which aired on Sky Uno. Zilli was also a contestant on the Sanremo Music Festival 2015. She competed with the song "Sola", which was being included in her third studio album, Frasi & fumo.

== Discography ==
- Sempre lontano (2010)
- L'amore è femmina (2012)
- Frasi & fumo (2015)
- Modern Art (2017)

== Awards ==
Year	Award	Nomination	Work	Result
2010	Sanremo Music Festival	Newcomers' Critics Award "Mia Martini"	"L'uomo che amava le donne"	Won
2010	Sanremo Music Festival	Assomusica Award	"L'uomo che amava le donne"	Won
2010	Sanremo Music Festival	Press, Radio & TV Award	"L'uomo che amava le donne"	Won
2010	Wind Music Awards	Young Artists Award	Herself	Won
2010	TRL Awards	Best Look	Herself	Nominated
2010	Premio Videoclip Italiano	Best Video by a Female Artist	"L'uomo che amava le donne"	Nominated
2010	MTV Europe Music Awards	Best Italian Act	Herself	Nominated
2011	Premio Videoclip Italiano	Best Video by a Female Artist	"Bacio d'a(d)dio"	Nominated
2011	Wind Music Awards	Platinum Award	Sempre lontano	Won
2011	TRL Awards	Italians Do It Better	Herself	Nominated
2011	TRL Awards	Best Look	Herself	Nominated
2015	Lunezia Award	Vintage-Pop Award	Frasi & fumo	Won

== Notes ==
Awards and achievements
Preceded by Raphael Gualazzi with "Madness of Love"	Italy in the Eurovision Song Contest; 2012	Succeeded by Marco Mengoni with "L'essenziale"
