= Marlene Kuntz =

Italian rock band

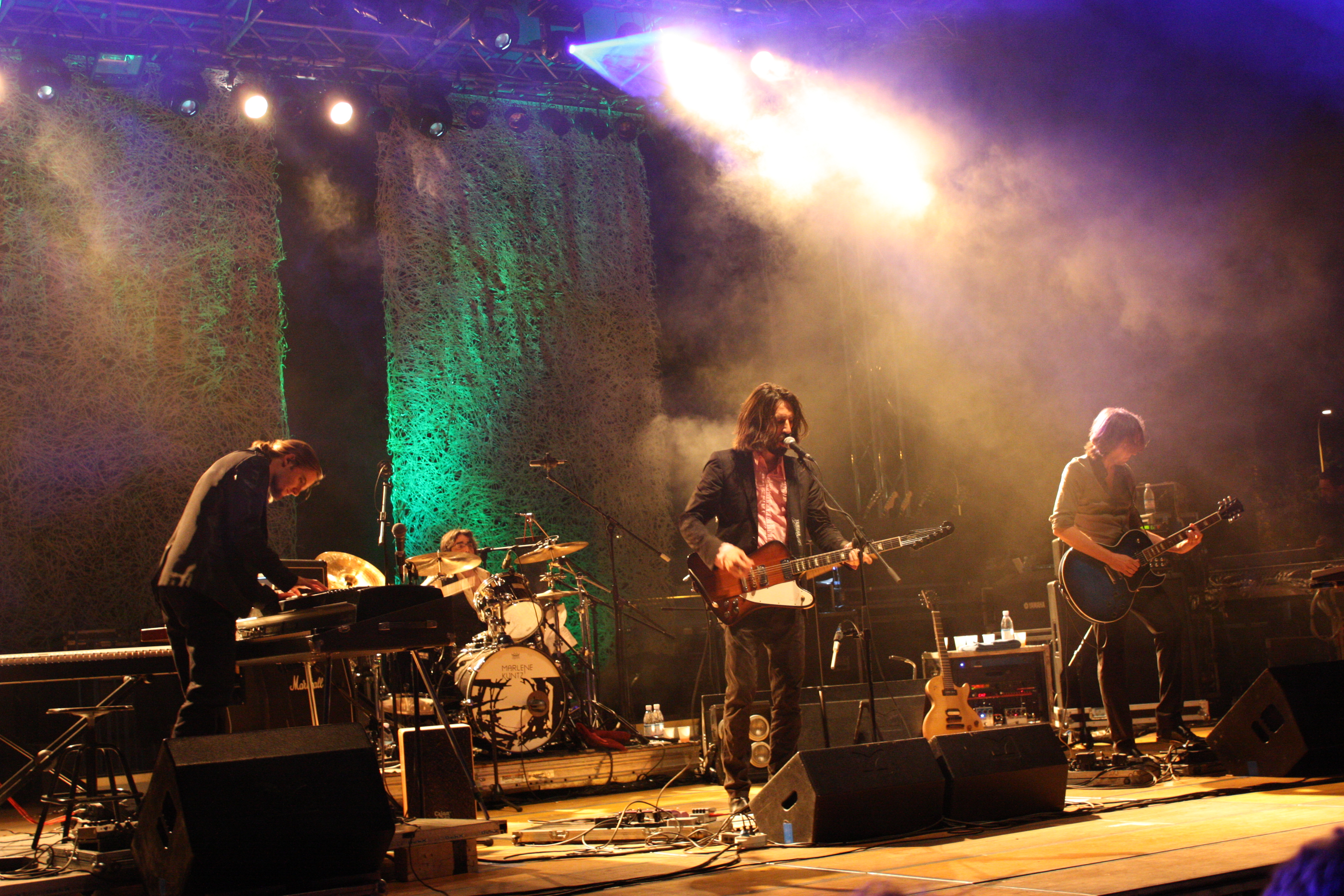
- Marlene Kuntz performing in 2008.

Background information
- Origin: Cuneo, Piedmont, Italy
- Genres: Alternative rock, noise rock, post-hardcore, experimental rock
- Years active: 1990–present
- Label: Sonica Studios
- Members: Cristiano Godano; Riccardo Tesio; Davide Arneodo; Luca Saporiti
- Past members: Luca Bergia (deceased); Gianni Maroccolo; Dan Solo; Franco Ballatore

Marlene Kuntz are an Italian alternative rock band formed in Cuneo in 1990. Initially they were inspired by the noise rock of Sonic Youth and the music of Nick Cave, Kyuss, Gun Club, Fugazi, Paolo Conte and many others (like Italian Progressive artists).

== History ==
Marlene Kuntz began forming in 1987 consisting of Luca Bergia on drums and Riccardo Tesio on guitar. Franco Ballatore joined the band on bass guitar the following year and that winter they found a rehearsal room in Confreria. In 1989, Cristiano Godano joined the band playing guitar and writing songs. Alex Astegiano also came in as the singer. In May they played their first concert in Cuneo playing "1° 2° 3°", "La verità" and "Emozioni Nascoste". In February 1990, they recorded a four-song demo including "La verità", "Trasudamerica", "1° 2° 3°" and "Capello lungo". In April they also recorded their first video, "Merry X-mas". After the concert on 25 April at Cortemilia, Alex left the band due to working pressure. Cristiano replaced him as a lead singer while continuing playing guitar. In July, the new line-up recorded the second demo with 4 songs: "Donna L", "Gioia che mi do", "Signor Niente" and "Merry X-mas".

In early 1992, the bassist Franco Ballatore left the band. However, he was replaced by Gianluca Viano and Marlene Kuntz came up with their third demo in March, consisting of five songs and a new style. The demo included: "M.K.", "Fuoco" (that became "Fuoco su di te" in Catartica), "La divina" (a revisited version was renamed "Cenere" in the Il vile), and "Ape Regina". The demo was well received leading to Marlene Kuntz competing at Rock Targato Italia. Marlene Kuntz reached the semi-final but failed to reach one of the first 8 positions. However, one of the competing bands quit the contest and Marlene Kuntz reentered successfully.

Marlene Kuntz released their debut album Catartica in May 1994, followed by Il vile in 1996.

In 2001, Marlene Kuntz was nominated for Best Italian Act at the 2001 MTV Europe Music Awards.

In 2012, they took part in Sanremo Music Festival with the song Canzone per un figlio.

Luca Bergia died at his home on the morning of 23 March 2023, at the age of 54.

== Discography ==
- Catartica (1994)
- Il vile (1996)
- Come di sdegno (1997) [EP]
- Ho ucciso paranoia (1999)
- Ho ucciso paranoia + Spore (1999)
- H.U.P. Live in Catharsis (1999) [Live]
- Che cosa vedi (2000)
- Cometa (2001) [EP]
- Spore (2001)
- Senza Peso (2003)
- Fingendo la poesia (2004) [EP]
- Bianco sporco (2005)
- S-Low (2006) [Live]
- Uno (2007)
- Best of Marlene Kuntz (2009)
- Cercavamo il silenzio (2009) [CD+DVD Live]
- Ricoveri virtuali e sexy solitudini (2010)
- Canzoni per un figlio (2012)
- Nella tua luce (2013)
- Pansonica (2014) [EP]
- Lunga Attesa (2016)

=== Videoclip and singles ===
- 1993 – Fuoco su di te
- 1994 – Merry X-Mas
- 1994 – Lieve
- 1996 – Come stavamo ieri
- 1996 – Festa mesta (live)
- 1999 – L'odio migliore
- 1999 – Infinità
- 1999 – Le Putte
- 1999 – In delirio
- 1999 – Canzone di domani (live)
- 1999 – Sonica (live)
- 2000 – Canzone di oggi
- 2000 – La canzone che scrivo per te
- 2000 – Serrande alzate
- 2003 – A fior di pelle
- 2003 – Notte
- 2005 – Poeti
- 2005 – Bellezza
- 2007 – Musa
- 2009 – Impressioni di settembre
- 2009 – Canzone in prigione
- 2010 – Paolo anima salva
- 2011 – Io e me
- 2011 – Vivo
- 2011 – Un piacere speciale
- 2012 – Canzone per un figlio
- 2012 – Il partigiano
- 2012 – Monnalisa
- 2013 – Solstizio
- 2013 – Il genio (L'importanza di essere Oscar Wilde)
- 2013 – Seduzione
- 2014 – Sotto la luna
- 2016 – Fecondità
- 2016 – Leda

== See also ==
- Italian rock
