= Alessandra Flora =

- Born: 25 September 1975 (age 51); Bari (Italy)
- Genres: Pop; rock
- Label: Sugar Music

Alessandra Flora (born 25 September 1975) is an Italian lyricist, composer and entrepreneur.

SIAE records almost 50 songs in her name; her most important successes are those of Gianni Morandi, Raf, Noemi, Nina Zilli, Malika Ayane and Emma Marrone.

== Biography ==
She approached music, particularly the piano, at the age of 6. She graduated in law at the age of 23 and she began to travel to and from Milan, London and Rome. In 1998 she began to manage the family business. In 2000 she attended a course for authors and composers at Mogol's CET, and she began to collaborate with Mogol's son, Alfredo Rapetti, also known as Cheope: this collaboration's most important creation is the song "Dimmi adesso con chi sei"; the music was written by Alessandra Flora, but both Alessandra Flora and Cheope wrote the lyrics. In the next few years she wrote for Mario Rosini, Marta Sànchez and Karima. In 2006 she moved to Florence, where she opened a designer hotel.

In 2012 she wrote for Noemi, with Marco Ciapelli, the piece "in un giorno qualunque", extracted as a single from RossoNoemi-2012 Edition, new edition of RossoNoemi, certified platinum record album, with over 60,000 sold copies. The piece was also recorded in live version for Noemi's album "RossoLive"; this record reached 25,000 sold copies. In the same year she was also one of the authors of "La casa sull'albero", which became a piece in Nina Zilli's album "L'amore è femmina", certified gold record with over 30,000 sold copies. On 30 October of the same year she worked as one of the authors for Bungaro's "Il valore del momento", sang as a duet with the Brazilian artist Miùcha; the piece was then put in the homonym album. On 1 October 2013 she was the writer of the music and lyrics of "Sono un "ti amo""; this piece was then included in Gianni Morandi's album "Bisogna vivere".

In 2014, at the Sanremo Music Festival, she was the writer of music and lyrics, with Nina Zilli and Marco Ciapelli, for Giuliano Palma's piece "Così lontano".

For the 2015 Sanremo Music Festival, she wrote the music, with Giovanni Caccamo, for Milika Ayane's piece "adesso e qui (nostalgico presente)", that won the third place for the critique prize "Mia Martini" of the Sanremo Music Festival.

In 2015 she worked as co-author for #RLL(riprenditi le lacrime), from Nina Zilli's record "Frasi & fumo".

"Rimani tu", launched single from Raf's new album.

"Finalmente", added in the album "Adesso" (Emma Marrone).

In 2016 she wrote both music and lyrics of "Mentre aspetto che torni" for Noemi, 7th track in the record "Cuore d'Artista".

== The careers of songwriter ==
- 2003 – Dimmi adesso con chi sei, sung by Gianni Morandi
- 2005 – Lei, sung by Mario Rosini
- 2007 – La noche que acabo (La notte delle favole), sung by Marta Sánchez
- 2009 – A metà strada, sung by Karima
- 2009 – Un angolo di mondosung, by Karima
- 2012 – In un giorno qualunque, sung by Noemi
- 2012 – La casa sull'albero, sung by Nina Zilli
- 2012 – Il valore del momento, sung by Bungaro (duetto con Miúcha)
- 2013 – Sono un "ti amo", sung by Gianni Morandi
- 2014 – Così lontano, sung by Giuliano Palma
- 2015 – Adesso e qui, sung by Malika Ayane
- 2015 – #RLL(riprenditi le lacrime), sung by Nina Zilli
- 2015 – Rimani tu, sung by Raf
- 2015 – Finalmente, sung by Emma
- 2016 – Mentre aspetto che ritorni, sung by Noemi
- 2017 – Giorni bellissimi, sung by Elodie
- 2017– Il punto in cui tornare, sung by Nina Zilli
