= L'amore è femmina (song) =

2012 single by Nina Zilli

Single by Nina Zilli

from the album L'amore è femmina
- Released: 13 April 2012
- Recorded: 2011; Kanepa Studio (Milan, Italy)
- Genre: Pop; R&B
- Length: 3:01
- Label: Universal Music Italy
- Songwriters: Maria Chiara Fraschetta; Charlie Mason; Christian Rabb; Kristoffer Sjökvist; Frida Molander
- Producer: Michele Canova

Nina Zilli singles chronology
"Per sempre" (2012)	"L'amore è femmina" (2012)	"Per le strade" (2012)

Music video
- "L'amore è femmina" on YouTube

Eurovision Song Contest 2012 entry
- Country: Italy
- Artist: Nina Zilli
- Languages: Italian, English
- Composers: Christian Rabb; Kristoffer Sjökvist; Frida Molander; Charlie Mason
- Lyricists: Maria Chiara Fraschetta; Christian Rabb; Kristoffer Sjökvist; Frida Molander; Charlie Mason

Finals performance
- Final result: 9th
- Final points: 101

Entry chronology
- ◄ "Madness of Love" (2011)
- "L'essenziale" (2013) ►

"L'amore è femmina" (Italian pronunciation: [laˈmoːre ɛ fˈfemmina]; English: "Love is female") is a song co-written and recorded by Italian singer-songwriter Nina Zilli. It was released on 13 April 2012 as the second single from her second studio album of the same title.

It was produced by Michele Canova and written by Zilli herself with American songwriter Charlie Mason (who went on to win the Eurovision Song Contest 2014) and Swedish songwriters Christian Rabb, Kristoffer Sjökvist and Frida Molander. The song was selected by the Italian broadcaster RAI to represent Italy in the Eurovision Song Contest 2012, which was held in Baku, Azerbaijan. At the contest, it was performed in a bilingual English–Italian version titled "L'amore è femmina (Out of Love)".

== Background and composition ==
The song was originally written in English by Christian Rabb, Kristoffer Sjökvist, Frida Molander and Charlie Mason. A demo of the song was later sent to Zilli's manager, Fabrizio Giannini. After hearing the song, Zilli translated the lyrics in Italian and recorded it with the title "L'amore è femmina". The song was chosen as the sixth track of her second studio album, named after the song itself.

Explaining the meaning of the song, Zilli claimed that the lyrics are written from the point of view of a woman telling her man that he should not expect anything from her if he acts "like a stupid". Zilli also stated that the song contains references to sensual love, specifying that she didn't intend to write a sort of new "Material Girl".

== Critical reception ==
OndaRock.it's Claudio Fabretti described the song as "an essay of muffled vocalism, counterpointed with a lot of choruses and wind instruments on a rocking rhythm".

== Eurovision Song Contest ==
During the Final of the 2012 Sanremo Music Festival, Nina Zilli was announced by the ESC 2011 winners Ell & Nikki as the singer who would represent Italy at the 2012 Eurovision Song Contest. One week later, her Sanremo entry, "Per sempre", was confirmed as the song chosen to represent Italy at the Eurovision Song Contest 2012. However, on 13 March 2012, RAI and Universal Music Italy announced that the Italian entry to the Eurovision Song Contest would be the title-track of her second studio album, L'amore è femmina.

The version that represented Italy in the Eurovision Song Contest 2012 was mostly sung in English, but it kept some of its parts in Italian. It was presented on 23 March 2012, at Eurovision's official website. A video of Zilli singing the song inside the studio was uploaded on their YouTube channel.

As Italy is one of the Eurovision's "Big Five", she automatically qualified for the final, where she finished in 9th place with 101 points.

== Music videos ==
On 23 March 2012, a preview video for "L'amore è femmina (Out of Love)" was uploaded on Eurovision.tv's YouTube channel. It shows Zilli inside the studio singing the international version of the song that represented Italy in Eurovision 2012.

The official music video, featuring the Italian-language version of the song, later premiered on 7 May 2012 on Gazzetta TV. The video, directed by Cosimo Alemà and filmed in March 2012 at a palazzo in EUR, Rome, focuses on Zilli, who is accompanied by six male dancers. The video for the international version of the song that represented Italy in Eurovision was eventually released on 10 March 2012.

== Live performances ==
The song was presented for the first time on a TV show on 25 April 2012, when Zilli performed live the Italian-language version of the song on the Italian programme Quelli che... il Calcio. The song was also included in the setlist of her L'amore è femmina tour, which started on 10 April 2012 in Florence.

== Track listing ==
- Digital Download
1. "L'amore è femmina (Out of Love)" – 3:01

== Charts ==
Chart (2012)	Peak position
Italy (FIMI)	40

== Release history ==
Region	Release date	Format	Version
Italy	13 April 2012	Mainstream radios	Italian
Italy	30 April 2012	Digital download	International
