= Erica Mou =

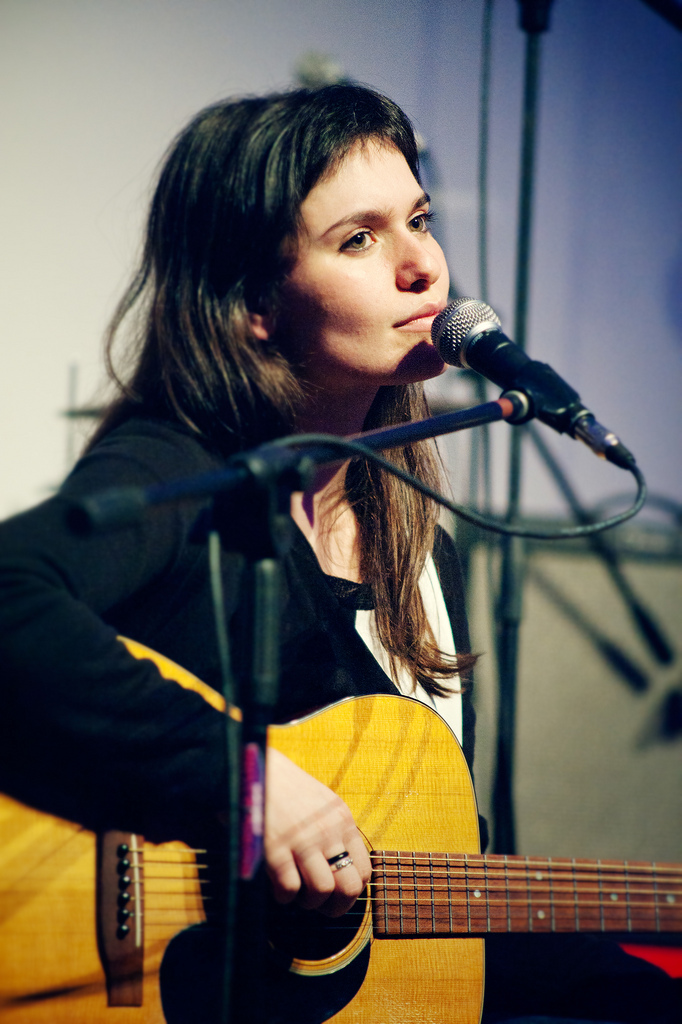

Background information
- Also known as: Erica Mou
- Born: Erica Musci; April 6, 1990 (age 36); Bisceglie, Italy
- Genres: Folk, pop, rock
- Occupation: Singer-songwriter
- Instruments: guitar, loop machine
- Years active: 2008–present
- Label: Sugar
- Website: ericamou.com

Erica Musci (born April 6, 1990), better known by her stage name Erica Mou, is an Italian singer and musician. Born in Bisceglie, Italy, she began studying singing at the age of 5, and playing guitar at 11.

After some minor musical experience, in 2008 she released her first album (with label Auand), Bacio Ancora le Ferite and began playing concerts. She won several prizes, including the award for "Best Lyrics" at SIAE and "New Indie Pop Artist" at M.E.I. (Meeting delle Etichette Indipendenti).

Her version of Don't Stop, originally by Fleetwood Mac, was the soundtrack to Eni commercials starting from January 2011.

In March 2011 she released her first major album, È, on Sugar. The album produced by Valgeir Sigurðsson (Björk, Sigur Rós) and arranged by Valgeir Sigurðsson and MaJiKer was anticipated by the first single "Giungla", with a video directed by Valentina Be and inspired by the true story of young model Tom Nicon’s suicide.

In October 2011 she toured in the United States for the Hit Week Festival, performing in New York City, Los Angeles and Miami.

In 2012 she entered the Sanremo Music Festival with the song "Nella vasca da bagno del tempo", winning the Mia Martini critics award.

In 2020 she released a novel "Nel mare c'è la sete", which will be released in English as "Thirsty Sea" in 2022.

== Discography ==
=== Albums ===
Title	Album details	Peak chart positions
Title	Album details	ITA
Bacio Ancora le Ferite	Released: 2009; Label: Auand; Formats: CD	—
È	Released: May 8, 2011; Re-released: February 14, 2012; Label: Sugar; Formats: CD, Digital download	—
Contro le Onde	Released: May 28, 2013; Label: Sugar; Formats: CD, Digital download	70
Tienimi il Posto	Released: September 4, 2015; Label: Auand, Artist First; Formats: CD, Digital download	24

=== EPs ===
Year	Title
2013	Dove Cadono i Fulmini

=== Singles ===
Year	Song	Album
2011	"Giungla"	È (and Sanremo edition)
2011	"Torno a Casa (Lasciami Guardare)"	È (and Sanremo edition)
2011	"Nella Vasca da Bagno del Tempo"	È (and Sanremo edition)
2013	"Mettiti la Maschera"	Contro le Onde
2013	"Dove Cadono i Fulmini"	Contro le Onde / Dove Cadono i Fulmini
2015	"Ho Scelto Te"	Tienimi il Posto
2015	"Se Mi Lasciassi Sola"	Tienimi il Posto

==== Featured singles ====
Year	Artist(s)	Song
2012	Boosta, Tricarico and Erica Mou	"Io Esisto" (official 2012 Telethon single)
2012	I.P.E.R.	"Ancora in Piedi"
2014	Molla feat. Erica Mou	"Via Brioschi 62"

=== Other appearances ===
Year	Artist(s)	Song	Album	Label
2008	Erica Mou	"Oltre" (live)	Roxy Bar DVD n.32	Strongful
2008	Erica Mou	"È" (live)	Roxy Bar DVD n.32	Strongful
2008	Erica Mou	"Pensiero Stupendo" (live)	Roxy Bar DVD n.32	Strongful
2013	Erica Mou	"Fili"	Missioni Swing soundtrack	Bunker Lab
2013	Perturbazione feat. Erica Mou	"Ossexione"	Musica X	Mescal
2014	Raphael Gualazzi feat. Erica Mou	"Time for My Prayers" (versione uno)	Un Ragazzo d'Oro soundtrack	Sugar
2014	Raphael Gualazzi feat. Erica Mou	"Time for My Prayers" (versione due)	Un Ragazzo d'Oro soundtrack	Sugar
2014	Raphael Gualazzi feat. Erica Mou	"Time for My Prayers" (versione completa)	Un Ragazzo d'Oro soundtrack	Sugar
2015	Favonio feat. Erica Mou	"Appoggiati ad un Muro"	Parole in Primo Piano	self-released
