= Cristiano Godano =

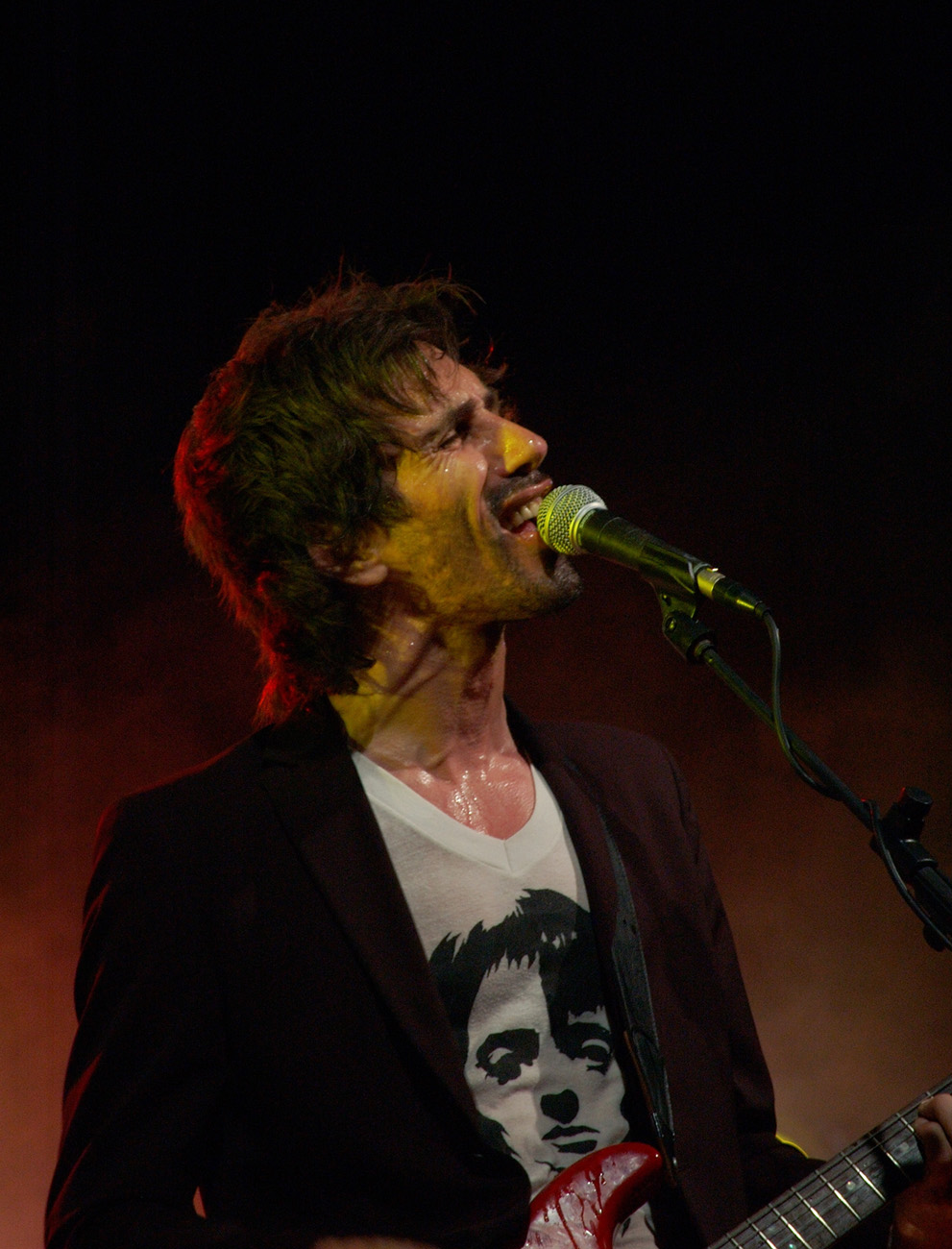

Background information
- Born: November 21, 1966 (age 59); Fossano, Cuneo, Italy
- Genres: Alternative rock
- Occupations: Vocalist, guitarist, writer
- Instruments: Vocals, piano, guitar
- Years active: 1987–present
- Label: Sonica studios
- Website: www.spaziodigitale2.org

Cristiano Godano (born November 21, 1966) is an Italian musician and author, known mostly as the frontman of the Italian band Marlene Kuntz. He obtained an MSc in Economics.

He played as a guest with the Afterhours at the 2009 Sanremo Festival. He has been appointed artistic director of the Upload 2010 musical festival in Bolzano.

== Non-musical activities ==
On January 16, 2008, he published his first book, the anthology of short novels I vivi ("The Living"), for Rizzoli. He also starred in "Tutta colpa di Giuda" an Italian movie shot by Davide Ferrario, of which he authored the soundtrack too.
