= Giuliano Palma & the Bluebeaters =

Italian Music Group

Giuliano Palma and the Bluebeaters are an Italian band performing a mix of reggae, ska and rocksteady. Formed in 1994, the Bluebeaters comprises musicians of the Italian groups Casino Royale (Giuliano Palma, Ferdinando Masi, Patrick Benifei), of Africa Unite (Bunna, Paolo Parpaglione, Cato Senatore) and of the Fratelli di Soledad (Zorro).

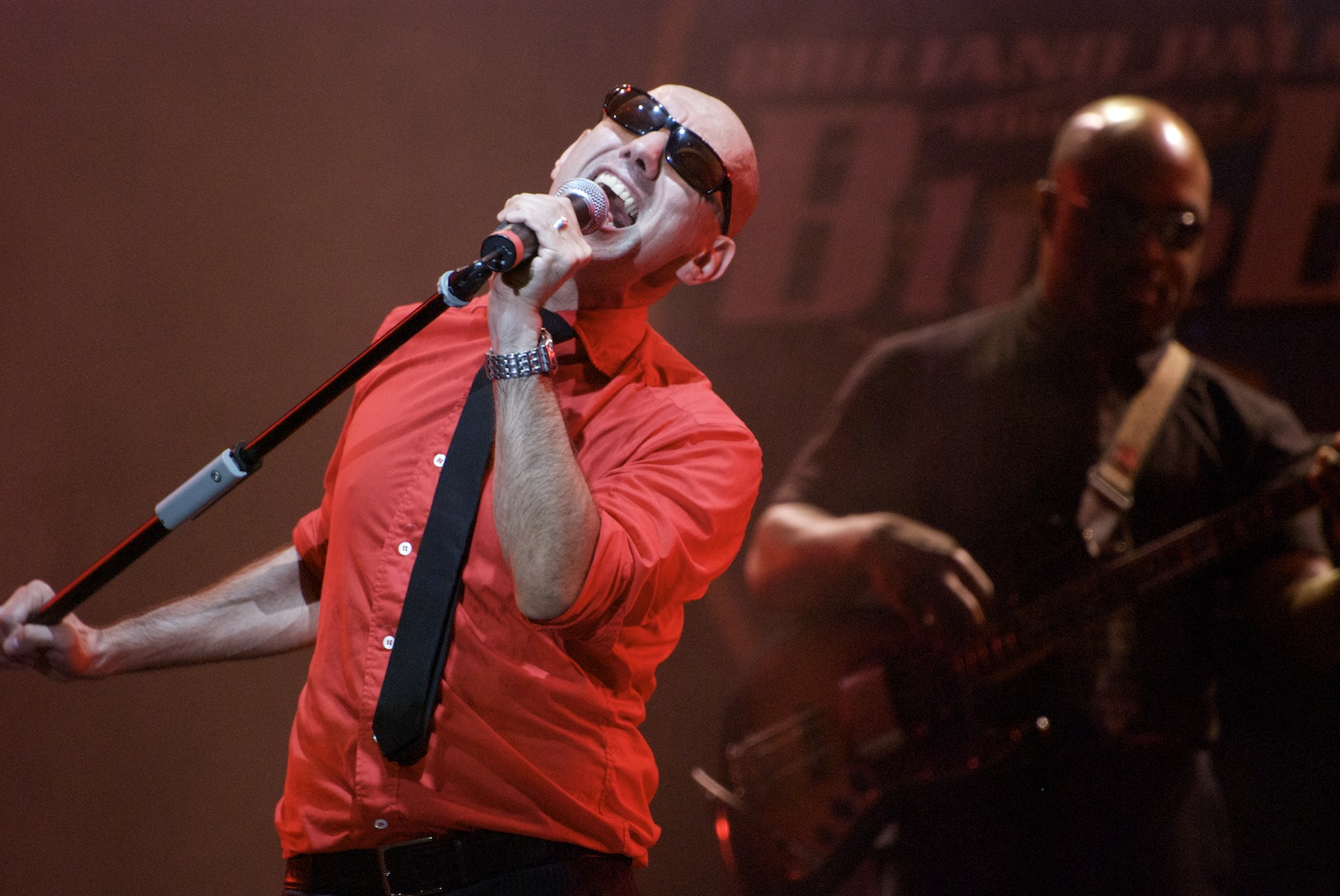
Giuliano palma (live) in 2009

At the end of 2012, singer Giuliano Palma left the band to pursue his solo career. In September 2013, original band members (with Pat Cosmo on vocals) reunited as The Bluebeaters for a concert in Turin, Italy. Next December, they did the first tour in years, ReTOURn, celebrating the band's comeback.

In June 2014, The Bluebeaters released their comeback single "Toxic/Catch That Teardrop" on Record Kicks. A tour celebrating their 20th anniversary followed, with the band appearing in Italy as well as in European festivals.

A new album called "Everybody Knows" was released on 13 April 2015, anticipated by the first single "Roll With It" on 9 March.

== Band members ==
=== Giuliano Palma and The Bluebeaters (2005) ===
- Giuliano Palma, voice, a.k.a. “The King”, formerly of Casino Royale
- Bunna, bass guitar, from Africa Unite
- Sheldon Gregg, bass guitar, from the New York Ska Jazz Ensemble
- Ferdinando Masi, drums, formerly of Casino Royale
- Cato Senatore, guitar, from Africa Unite
- Paolo Parpaglione, saxophone, a.k.a. “The Angelo”, from Africa Unite
- Gigi De Gaspari, trombone, a.k.a. “Mr. T-Bone”
- Peter Truffa, piano and keyboard, from the New York Ska Jazz Ensemble
- Fabio Merigo, guitar, from the Reggae National Tickets

=== The Bluebeaters (2013 - present) ===
- Patrick Benifei, voice, a.k.a. "Pat Cosmo", from Casino Royale
- Ferdinando Masi, drums, a.k.a. "Count Ferdi", formerly of Casino Royale
- Gianluca Senatore, guitar, a.k.a. "Cato", formerly of Africa Unite
- Paolo Parpaglione, saxophone, a.k.a. "The Angelo" or "DeAngelo", formerly of Africa Unite
- Gigi De Gaspari, trombone, a.k.a., "Mr. T-Bone", formerly of Africa Unite

== Discography ==
- The Album (KingSizeRecords, 9 June 1999)
- The Album widened edition (KingSizeRecords/V2 Records, October 2000)
- The Wonderful Live (KingSizeRecords/V2 Records, October 2001) (Live)
- Long Playing (V2 Records, 30 September 2005)
- Boogaloo (V2 RECORDS, 12 October 2007)
- Combo (V2 RECORDS, 6 November 2009)

The Bluebeaters

- Everybody Knows (Record Kicks, 13 April 2015)
- Shock (Garrincha Dischi, 9 October 2020)
