= Dolcenera discography =

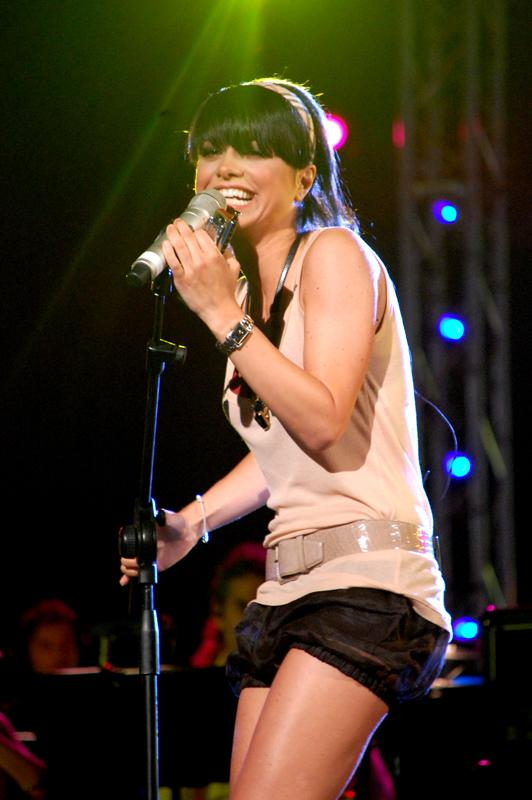
- Dolcenera during a concert in 2008
- Studio albums: 7
- Extended plays: 1
- Compilation albums: 1
- Singles: 20
- Music videos: 22
- Promotional singles: 3

The discography of Dolcenera, an Italian singer-songwriter, consists of seven studio albums and one extended play, which spawned seventeen singles as a lead artist, three promotional singles and twenty-one music videos.

After releasing her debut single in 2002, "Solo tu", Dolcenera recorded her first studio album, Sorriso nucleare, which was released after her appearance at the Sanremo Music Festival 2003, during which she received first prize in the Newcomers' section for her entry "Siamo tutti là fuori", which became her first top ten single in Italy.

Her second and third studio albums, Un mondo perfetto and Il popolo dei sogni, were released in 2005 and 2006, and they were both awarded platinum for sales in Italy. In 2006, a compilation album including tracks from these two records, titled Un mondo perfetto, was released in Germany, Switzerland and Austria only.

Her first studio album for a major label, Dolcenera nel paese delle meraviglie, was released for Sony Music in 2009 and spawned the hit single "Il mio amore unico". Dolcenera later signed a new recording deal with EMI. Evoluzione della specie, her fifth studio album, was released in 2011, and re-released the following year under the title Evoluzione della specie², with additional tracks including the single "Ci vediamo a casa".

After releasing the singles "Niente al mondo", "Accendi lo spirito", "Fantastica" and "Un peccato" between 2014 and 2015, Dolcenera released a new album, Le stelle non-tremano, in September 2015. The studio set became her second top 5 album in Italy.

Dolcenera was also a member of the supergroup Artisti Uniti per l'Abruzzo, which released the charity single "Domani 21/04.09", and she appeared as a featured artist on the Italian version of British rapper Professor Green's single "Read All About (Tutto quello che devi sapere)", included both in his album At Your Inconvenience and in Dolcenera's Evoluzione della specie². During her career Dolcenera appeared on the albums of other Italian recording artists, including Roberto Vecchioni, Claudio Baglioni and the progressive rock band Premiata Forneria Marconi.

== Albums ==
=== Studio albums ===
List of albums, with selected chart positions, sales, and certifications
Title	Album details	Peak chart positions		Sales	Certifications
Title	Album details	ITA	EU	Sales	Certifications
Sorriso nucleare	Released: March 2003; Label: Amarena Music; Formats: CD	38	—		
Un mondo perfetto	Released: 20 May 2005; Label: Amarena Music; Formats: CD, CD+DVD	4	49	ITA: 150,000	ITA: Platinum
Il popolo dei sogni	Released: 3 March 2006; Label: Amarena Music; Formats: CD	16	—	ITA: 80,000	ITA: Platinum
Dolcenera nel paese delle meraviglie	Released: 20 February 2009; Label: Sony Music; Formats: CD, download	13	—		
Evoluzione della specie (re-released as Evoluzione della specie²)	Released: 17 May 2011; Label: EMI Music Italy; Formats: CD, download	15	—		
Le stelle non tremano (re-released as Le stelle non-tremano – Supernovae)	Released: 11 September 2015; Label: K6DN, Universal; Formats: CD, LP, download	5	—		
Anima mundi	Released: 2 December 2022; Label: K6DN, Universal; Formats: LP, download	—	—		

=== Compilation albums ===
List of albums
Title	Album details
Un mondo perfetto	Released: 29 August 2006; Re-released on 30 March 2007; Published in Germany, Austria and Switzerland only; Label: Amarena Music; Formats: CD

== Extended plays ==
List of albums
Title	Album details
Dolcenera canta il cinema	Released: 1 February 2006; Label: Amarena Music; Formats: CD

== Singles ==
=== As lead singer ===
List of singles, with chart positions and certifications in Italy
Single	Year	Peak chart positions	Certifications	Album
Single	Year	ITA	Certifications	Album
"Solo tu"	2002	—		Sorriso nucleare
"Siamo tutti là fuori"	2003	10		Sorriso nucleare
"Continua"	2005	18		Un mondo perfetto
"Com'è straordinaria la vita"	2006	6		Il popolo dei sogni
"Passo dopo passo" (Germany only)	2006	—		Un mondo perfetto (Tour Edition)
"Piove (Condizione dell'anima)"	2006	11		Il popolo dei sogni
"Il mio amore unico"	2009	5	ITA: Platinum	Dolcenera nel Paese delle Meraviglie
"La più bella canzone d'amore che c'è"	2009	—		Dolcenera nel Paese delle Meraviglie
"Un dolce incantesimo"	2009	47		Dolcenera nel Paese delle Meraviglie
"Il sole di domenica"	2011	36		Evoluzione della specie
"L'amore è un gioco"	2011	42		Evoluzione della specie
"Ci vediamo a casa"	2012	6	ITA: Platinum	Evoluzione della specie²
"Un sogno di libertà"	2012	—		Evoluzione della specie²
"Niente al mondo"	2014	44		Le stelle non-tremano
"Accendi lo spirito"	2014	—		Le stelle non-tremano
"Fantastica"	2015	—		Le stelle non-tremano
"Un peccato"	2015	—		Le stelle non-tremano
"Ora o mai più (Le cose cambiano)"	2016	52		Le stelle non-tremano – Supernovae

=== As featured artist ===
List of singles, with chart positions in Italy, showing year released and album name
Single	Year	Peak chart positions	Certification	Album
Single	Year	ITA	Certification	Album
"Domani 21/04.09" (Artisti Uniti per l'Abruzzo)	2009	1	ITA: 2× Platinum	Charity single
"Read All About It (Tutto quello che devi sapere)" (Professor Green featuring Dolcenera)	2011	18	ITA: Gold	At Your Inconvenience
"Ma il cielo è sempre più blu" (Italian All Stars 4 Life)	2020	5		Charity single
"Promesse mascherate" (Istentales featuring Paolo Fresu, Roberto Vecchioni, Dolcenera, Elio e le Storie Tese, Yuri Cilloni and Urisè)	2026	—		Non-album single

== Promotional singles ==
List of promotional singles, with chart positions and certifications in Italy
Single	Year	Peak chart positions	Certifications	Album
Single	Year	ITA	Certifications	Album
"Devo andare al mare"	2003	—		Sorriso nucleare
"Vivo tutta la notte"	2004	—		Sorriso nucleare
"Mai più noi due"	2005	—		Un mondo perfetto

== Other charted songs ==
List of singles, with chart positions and certifications in Italy
Single	Year	Peak chart positions	Certifications	Album
Single	Year	ITA	Certifications	Album
"Pensiero stupendo"	2005	58		Un mondo perfetto

== Music videos ==
List of music videos, showing year released and director
Title	Year	Director(s)
"Siamo tutti là fuori"	2003	—N/a
"Devo andare al mare"	2003	—N/a
"Mai più noi due"	2005	Gaetano Morbioli
"Passo dopo passo"	2005	Davide Corallo
"Continua"	2005	Giangi Magnoni
"Com'è straordinaria la vita"	2006	Giangi Magnoni
"Il luminal d'immenso"	2006	IED's students
"Piove (Condizione dell'anima)"	2006	Francesco Fei
"Il mio amore unico"	2009	Gaetano Morbioli
"Domani 21/04.09" (with Artisti Uniti per l'Abruzzo)	2009	Ambrogio Lo Giudice
"La più bella canzone d'amore che c'è"	2009	Gaetano Morbioli
"Un dolce incantesimo"	2009	Gaetano Morbioli
"Il sole di domenica"	2011	Alex Orlowski
"L'amore è un gioco"	2011	Saku
"Read All About It (Tutto quello che devi sapere)" (Professor Green feat. Dolcenera)	2011	Veronica Mengoli, Henry Schofield
"Ci vediamo a casa"	2012	Valentina Be
"Un sogno di libertà"	2012	Valentina Be
"Niente al mondo"	2014	Fabio Jansen, Andrea Basile
"Accendi lo spirito"	2014	Matteo Bombarda
"Fantastica"	2015	Jansen&Rodriguez
"Un peccato"	2015	Matteo Bombarda
"Ora o mai più (Le cose cambiano)"	2016	Gabriele Surdo

== Other appearances ==
List of other album appearances
Contribution	Year	Album
"Un destino di rondine" (Premiata Forneria Marconi featuring Dolcenera)	2005	Dracula: Opera Rock
"Come sei tu" (Claudio Baglioni featuring Dolcenera)	2009	Q.P.G.A.
"Madeline" (Francesco Sighieri featuring Dolcenera)	2010	Soft rock
"Il mio amore unico" (Live)	2010	Amiche per l'Abruzzo (DVD)
"Stanno a guardare" (Istentales featuring Dolcenera)	2010	Onora s'istranzu
"Il cuore è uno zingaro" (Neri per Caso featuring Dolcenera)	2010	Donne
"Il nostro amore" (Roberto Vecchioni featuring Dolcenera)	2011	Chiamami ancora amore
"Georgie" (Cristina D'Avena featuring Dolcenera)	2018	Duets Forever
"Grande" (Paolo Vallesi featuring Dolcenera)	2022	Noi
