= Sorriso (disambiguation) =

Sorriso is a municipality in the state of Mato Grosso, Brazil.

Sorriso may also refer to:

- Sorriso Airport, airport in Sorriso, Mato Grosso
- Sorriso Esporte Clube, Brazilian football club in Sorriso, Mato Grosso
- Sorriso Maroto, Brazil pagode band formed in 1997
- Sorriso (footballer, born 1994), Ingrid de Paula Silva, Brazilian footballer
- Sorriso (footballer, born 2001), Marcos Vinicios Lopes Moura, Brazilian footballer
- Sorriso nucleare, 2003 album by Italian artist Dolcenera
