= Un mondo perfetto =

Studio album by Dolcenera
- Released: May 18, 2005
- Recorded: 2004–2005
- Genre: Pop
- Length: 44 min: 53 sec
- Label: Amarena Music / BMG Ricordi
- Producer: Lucio Fabbri

Dolcenera chronology
Sorriso nucleare (2003)	Un mondo perfetto (2005)	Il popolo dei sogni (2006)

Un mondo perfetto is the second studio album by Italian singer Dolcenera, released on May 18, 2005 via Amarena Music/BMG Ricordi. It peaked at #4 on the Italian album chart and spawned three singles "Mai più noi due", "Continua" and "Passo dopo passo".

== Track listing ==
No.	Title	Writer(s)	Length
1.	"Mai più noi due"	Dolcenera	3:36
2.	"Qualche volta"	Dolcenera	4:04
3.	"Sei bellissima"	Claudio Daiano, Gian Pietro Felisatti	3:28
4.	"Tutto è niente"	Dolcenera, Francesco Sighieri	3:48
5.	"Un mondo perfetto"	Dolcenera	3:42
6.	"Lulù & Marlene"	Federico Renzulli, Gianni Maroccolo, Antonio Aiazzi, Piero Pelù	3:09
7.	"Passo dopo passo"	Dolcenera	4:34
8.	"Com'eri tu"	Dolcenera	3:57
9.	"Pensiero stupendo"	Ivano Fossati, Oscar Prudente	2:23
10.	"Continua"	Dolcenera	4:27
11.	"Portami via"	Dolcenera	4:32
12.	"Mai più noi due" (Pianovocecolori)	Dolcenera	3:07

== Un mondo perfetto (Germany, Austria and Switzerland) ==
On 29 August 2006, a new version of the album was released in Germany, Austria and Switzerland. The new edition includes songs from the Italian albums Un mondo perfetto and Il popolo dei sogni. The last track of the album is a new version of Dolcenera's first top-ten single, "Siamo tutti là fuori", included in her debut album Sorriso nucleare.

Germany, Austria and Switzerland
No.	Title	Writer(s)	Length
1.	"Mai più noi due"	Dolcenera	3:34
2.	"Passo dopo passo"	Dolcenera	4:34
3.	"Continua"	Dolcenera	4:26
4.	"Com'eri tu"	Dolcenera	3:56
5.	"Com'è straordinaria la vita"	Dolcenera, Roberto Pacco, Lorenzo Imerico	3:53
6.	"Giusta o sbagliata"	Dolcenera, Claudio Serughetti	3:34
7.	"Piove (Condizione dell'anima)"	Dolcenera, Francesco Sighieri	4:04
8.	"Il popolo dei sogni"	Dolcenera	4:27
9.	"Resta come sei"	Dolcenera	4:25
10.	"Tutto è niente"	Dolcenera, Sighieri	3:48
11.	"Un mondo perfetto"	Dolcenera	3:43
12.	"L'amore (Il mostro)"	Dolcenera	4:40
13.	"E la Luna sale su"	Dolcenera	3:43
14.	"Siamo tutti là fuori"	Dolcenera	4:13

Tour edition bonus tracks (released on March 30, 2007)
No.	Title	Writer(s)	Length
15.	"Portami via"	Dolcenera	4:33
16.	"Com'eri tu" (Live in Italy 2005)	Dolcenera	4:48
17.	"Giusta o sbagliata" (Live in Italy 2006)	Dolcenera, Serughetti	3:45
18.	"Mai più noi due" (Live in Berlin 2006)	Dolcenera	4:34

== Charts ==
Album

Year	Chart	Position
2005	Italian album chart	4

The album sold nearly 150.000 copies.

Singles

Cover	Video	Information
		"Mai più noi due": Released: May 2005; Writer: Dolcenera; Producer: Lucio Fabbri; Director: Gaetano Bormioli
		"Continua": Released: October 2005; Writer: Dolcenera; Producer: Lucio Fabbri; Director: Giangi Magnoni; Chart positions: #18
		"Passo dopo passo": Released: August 2006; Writer: Dolcenera; Producer: Lucio Fabbri; Director: Davide Corallo
