= Scorrano =

- Comune
- Comune di Scorrano
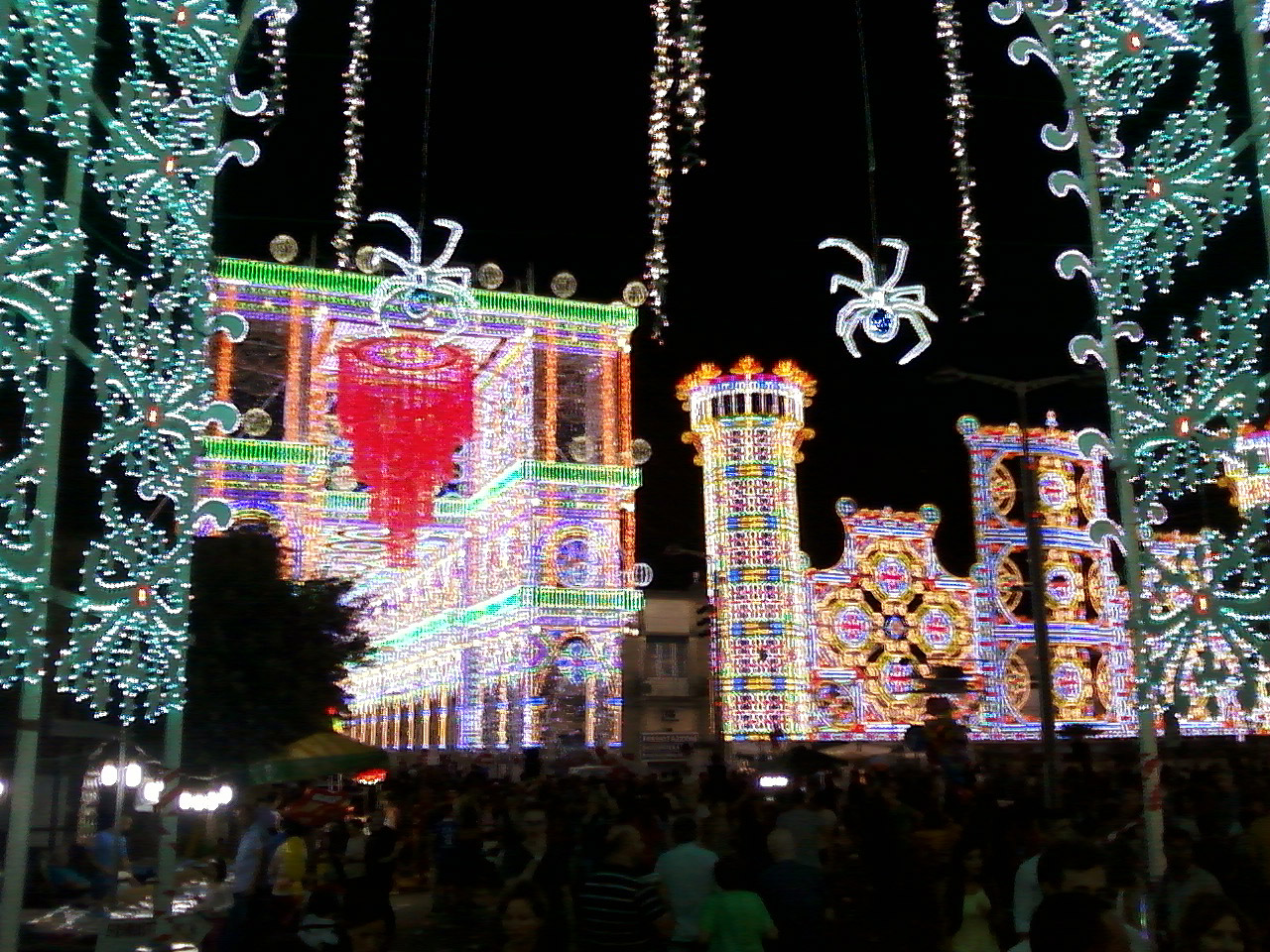
- Scorrano in 2013

- Location within Italy Location within Apulia
- Coordinates: 40°6′N 18°18′E
- Country: Italy
- Region: Apulia
- Province: Lecce (LE)
- Frazioni: Botrugno, Cutrofiano, Maglie, Muro Leccese, Sanarica, Supersano

Area
  - Total: 34 km^{2} (13 sq mi)
- Elevation: 95 m (312 ft)

Population (2018-01-01)
  - Total: 6,974
  - Density: 210/km^{2} (530/sq mi)
- Demonym: Scorranesi
- Time zone: UTC+1 (CET)
  - Summer (DST): UTC+2 (CEST)
- Postal code: 73020
- Dialing code: 0836
- ISTAT code: 075073
- Patron saint: Santa Domenica
- Saint day: 6 July

Scorrano (Salentino: Scurannu) is a town and comune in the Italian province of Lecce in the Apulia region of south-east Italy.

The Italian singer Dolcenera was born in Scorrano.

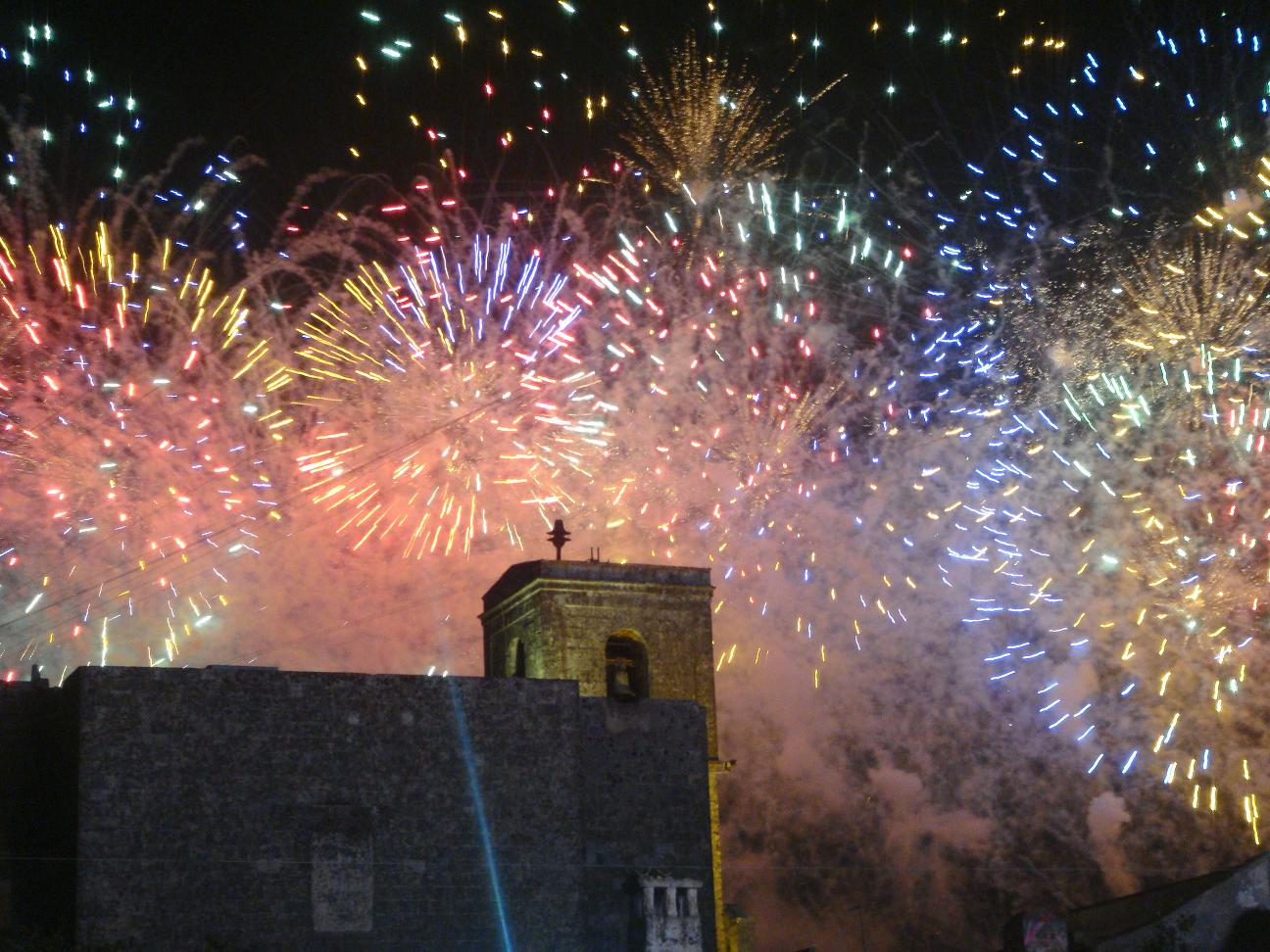
Typical Summer's party in Scorrano
