= Evoluzione della specie =

Studio album by Dolcenera
- Released: 17 May 2011
- Recorded: July – November 2010 at Jungle Sound Studio (Milan)
- Genre: Pop, electronic music
- Length: 41:36
- Language: Italian
- Label: EMI Music Italy
- Producer: Dolcenera, Roberto Vernetti

Dolcenera chronology
Dolcenera nel paese delle meraviglie (2009)	Evoluzione della specie (2011)	Le stelle non tremano (2015)

Singles from Evoluzione della specie
- 1. "Il sole di domenica" Released: 8 April 2011; 2. "L'amore è un gioco" Released: 26 August 2011

Evoluzione della specie²

Singles from Evoluzione della specie²
- 1. "Read All About It (Tutto quello che devi sapere)" Released: 9 December 2011; 2. "Ci vediamo a casa" Released: 15 February 2012; 3. "Un sogno di libertà" Released: 11 May 2012

Evoluzione della specie is the fifth studio album by Italian singer-songwriter Dolcenera, released on 17 May 2011 by EMI Music Italy. It was preceded by the single "Il sole di domenica", released on 7 April 2011 and written by Dolcenera and Bandabardò's member Finaz. The second single from the album, "L'amore è un gioco", was released in Italy on 26 August 2011.

Following Dolcenera's participation in the Sanremo Music Festival 2012, the album was re-released with the title Evoluzione della specie². The 2012 version of the album includes the singles "Read All About It (Tutto quello che devi sapere)", "Ci vediamo a casa" and "Un sogno di libertà", as well as the additional new track "Sarà un giorno bellissimo".

== Background and conception ==
In May 2010, Dolcenera revealed in an interview that she was writing the songs for her fifth studio album:

I listened to more than 150 old albums, all of them published between 1967 and 1974. It is the music I like, and it inspired a lot of contemporary artists that I like. I wanted to hear with my own ears where does a certain sound come from.

Dolcenera later stated that, while the previous albums were composed starting with a piano, the songs from Evoluzione della specie were composed starting from drums and bass.

The album was recorded from July 2010 to November 2010 at the Jungle Sound Studio in Milan. Dolcenera documented the recording process publishing 5 videos on her YouTube official channel. On 30 November 2010 she announced the end of the recording sessions:

The result is a sort of summary of different elements and factors. There are a lot of people working on this album, even more than on the previous one.

Seven songs from the album were produced by Roberto Vernetti and Dolcenera, while the remaining ones were produced by Dolcenera. Alex Trecarichi recorded and mixed all the songs from the album. Dolcenera also wrote, composed and arranged the songs from her new album. Moreover, she played drums for the first time in her career.

The title of the album was officially announced on 7 April 2011, while the first single, "Il sole di domenica", was released the following day.

== Track listing ==
=== Evoluzione della specie ===
CD (EAN 5099908222824)
No.	Title	Writer(s)	Producer(s)	Length
1.	"Il sole di domenica"	Dolcenera, Alessandro Finazzo	Roberto Vernetti, Dolcenera	3:40
2.	"Evoluzione della specie uomo"	Dolcenera	Dolcenera	2:51
3.	"Viva"	Dolcenera	Vernetti, Dolcenera	3:37
4.	"L'amore è un gioco"	Dolcenera, Francesco Sighieri	Vernetti, Dolcenera	4:09
5.	"Nel regime delle belle apparenze"	Dolcenera	Dolcenera	3:32
6.	"A un passo dalla felicità"	Dolcenera	Vernetti, Dolcenera	3:36
7.	"Nel cuore e nella mente"	Dolcenera, Saverio Lanza	Vernetti, Dolcenera	4:10
8.	"Il tempo di pretendere"	Dolcenera, Luca Monti	Vernetti, Dolcenera	5:30
9.	"La preghiera di Virginia"	Dolcenera, Francesco Rapetti	Dolcenera	3:48
10.	"I colori dell'arcobaleno"	Dolcenera	Vernetti, Dolcenera	3:25
11.	"Dagli occhi di una donna"	Dolcenera, Stefano Brandoni	Dolcenera	3:18

iTunes bonus track
No.	Title	Writer(s)	Producer(s)	Length
12.	"Come un'aquila"	Dolcenera	Dolcenera	3:19

=== Evoluzione della specie² ===
CD (EAN 5099955989121)
No.	Title	Writer(s)	Producer(s)	Length
1.	"Il sole di domenica"	Dolcenera, Alessandro Finazzo	Roberto Vernetti, Dolcenera	3:40
2.	"Evoluzione della specie uomo"	Dolcenera	Dolcenera	2:51
3.	"Ci vediamo a casa"	Dolcenera	Dolcenera	3:59
4.	"L'amore è un gioco"	Dolcenera, Francesco Sighieri	Vernetti, Dolcenera	4:09
5.	"A un passo dalla felicità"	Dolcenera	Vernetti, Dolcenera	3:36
6.	"Nel regime delle belle apparenze"	Dolcenera	Dolcenera	3:32
7.	"Un sogno di libertà"	Saverio Lanza, Dolcenera	Vernetti, Dolcenera	3:28
8.	"Read All About It (Tutto quello che devi sapere)" (with Professor Green)	Stephen Manderson, Iain James, Tom Barnes, Ben Kohn, Pete Kelleher, Dolcenera	TMS, iSHi	3:56
9.	"La preghiera di Virginia"	Dolcenera, Francesco Rapetti	Dolcenera	3:48
10.	"Viva"	Dolcenera	Vernetti, Dolcenera	3:37
11.	"Sarà un giorno bellissimo"	Dolcenera	Vernetti, Dolcenera	4:02
12.	"I colori dell'arcobaleno"	Dolcenera	Vernetti, Dolcenera	3:25
13.	"Nel cuore e nella mente"	Dolcenera, Saverio Lanza	Vernetti, Dolcenera	4:10
14.	"Il tempo di pretendere"	Dolcenera, Luca Monti	Vernetti, Dolcenera	5:30
15.	"Dagli occhi di una donna"	Dolcenera, Stefano Brandoni	Dolcenera	3:18

iTunes bonus track
No.	Title	Writer(s)	Producer(s)	Length
16.	"Come un'aquila"	Dolcenera	Dolcenera	3:19

== Musical style and themes ==
The album has a pop rock sound, with influences from rock music and electronic music. In order to obtain a particular sound, it was recorded live in studio with the whole band and then mixed as if the recording sessions were obtained through computer programming.

The most important themes from the album are the willing to win against fear for the future and the willing to start a new age, despite the feeling of being precarious and unstable.

== Promotion ==
In the days before the album's release, Dolcenera did a number of performances and interviews on various Italian television shows, including Domenica in, Top of the Pops and Quelli che il calcio e..., singing the leading single "Il sole di domenica". The song was also performed during the TRL Awards 2011, on 20 April 2011.

On 17 May 2011, Dolcenera also started an in-store tour, showcasing her album in Milan, Rome, Florence and Turin.

== Charts ==
=== Peak positions ===
Chart (2011)	Peak position
Italian Albums Chart	15

=== Year-end charts ===
Chart (2012)	Position
Italian Albums Chart	95

== Release history ==
Country	Release date	Format(s)	Label	Version
Italy	17 May 2011	CD, Digital download	K6DN Records, EMI Music Italy	Evoluzione della specie
Italy	15 February 2012	CD, Digital download	K6DN Records, EMI Music Italy	Evoluzione della specie²
