= Il popolo dei sogni =

Studio album by Dolcenera
- Released: 3 March 2006
- Recorded: 2005–2006
- Genre: Pop
- Length: 41:10
- Language: Italian
- Label: Amarena Music, Around the Music, Edel
- Producer: Lucio Fabbri

Dolcenera chronology
Un mondo perfetto (2005)	Il popolo dei sogni (2006)	Dolcenera nel paese delle meraviglie (2009)

Il popolo dei sogni is the third studio album by Italian singer-songwriter Dolcenera, released on 3 March 2006 via Amarena Music. The album peaked at number 16 on the Italian Albums Chart and it was certified platinum by the Federation of the Italian Music Industry. It spawned the singles "Com'è straordinaria la vita" and "Piove (condizione dell'anima)".

== Track listing ==
No.	Title	Writer(s)	Length
1.	"Com'è straordinaria la vita"	Dolcenera, Lorenzo Imerico, Roberto Pacco	3:54
2.	"Giusta o sbagliata"	Dolcenera, Claudio Serughetti	3:34
3.	"Piove (Condizione dell'anima)"	Dolcenera, Francesco Sighieri	4:04
4.	"Il luminal d'immenso (L'ombra di lui)"	Thom Yorke, Jonny Greenwood, Ed O'Brien, Colin Greenwood, Phil Selway, Dolcenera	3:20
5.	"L'amore (Il mostro)"	Dolcenera	4:40
6.	"Resta come sei"	Dolcenera	4:25
7.	"Il popolo dei sogni"	Dolcenera	4:28
8.	"E la Luna sale su"	Dolcenera	3:44
9.	"America"	Gianna Nannini, Mauro Paoluzzi	3:51
10.	"Emozioni" (Live)	Lucio Battisti, Mogol	5:06

== Other ==
- The album sold nearly 60,000 copies.
- The song "Il luminal d'immenso (L'ombra di lui)" is a cover of Radiohead's "A Wolf at the Door", from their album Hail to the Thief (2003).

== Charts ==
Chart (2006)	Position
Italian Album Chart	16

== Singles ==
- "Com'è straordinaria la vita"
  - Released: March 2006
  - Writer: Dolcenera, Lorenzo Imerico, Roberto Pacco
  - Producer: Lucio Fabbri
  - Director: Giangi Magnoni
  - Chart positions: #5
- "Piove (Condizione dell'anima)"
  - Released: September 2006
  - Writer: Dolcenera
  - Producer: Lucio Fabbri
  - Director: Francesco Fei
  - Chart positions: #18
