= Dolcenera =

Italian singer-songwriter (born 1977)

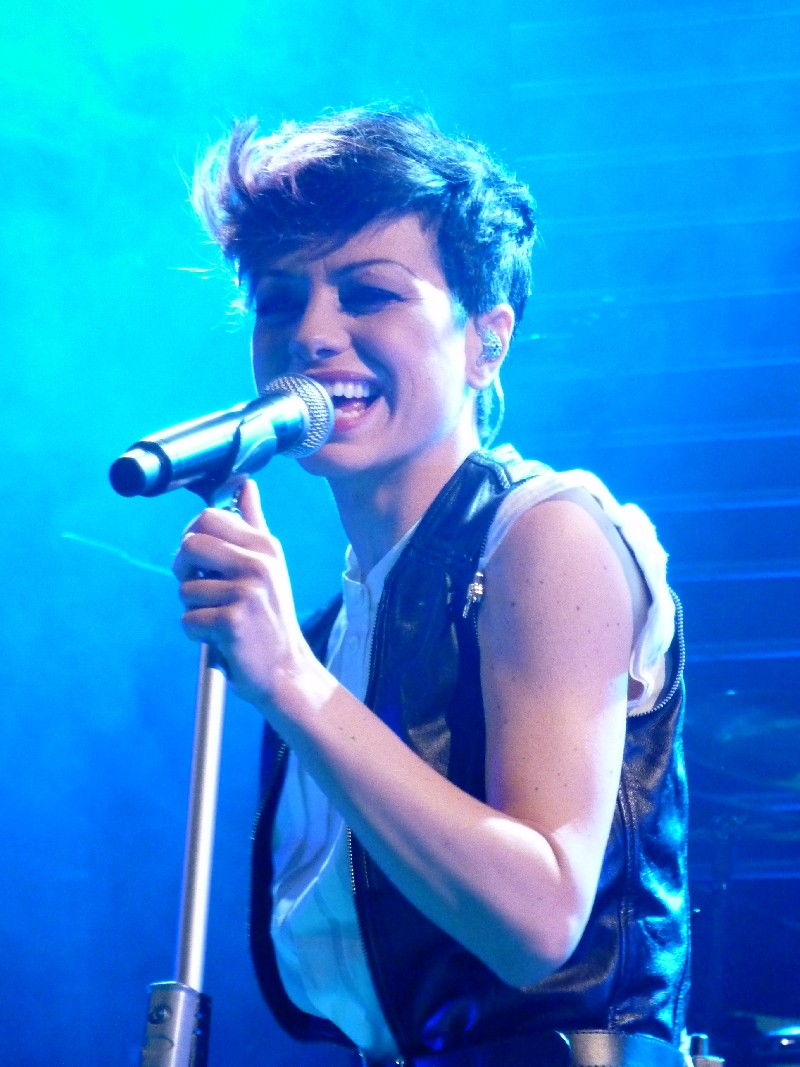
- Dolcenera in concert, 2011

Background information
- Born: Emanuela Trane; 16 May 1977 (age 49); Galatina, Apulia, Italy
- Origin: Scorrano, Apulia, Italy
- Genres: Pop; pop rock; R&B
- Occupations: Singer; musician; songwriter; actress
- Instruments: Vocals; piano; guitar; synth; theremin; drums
- Years active: 1993–present
- Labels: Amarena Music; Sony Music; EMI Music
- Website: dolcenera.com

Emanuela Trane (born 16 May 1977), known by her stage name Dolcenera (Italian pronunciation: [ˌdoltʃeˈneːra], lit. 'Sweet [and] Black'), is an Italian singer, songwriter and actress. She rose to fame in 2003, after winning the newcomers' section of the Sanremo Music Festival, but she achieved commercial success in Italy only in 2005, when she won the music-based reality show Music Farm and she released her second album, Un mondo perfetto. In 2005 she was also awarded Best New Artist of the Year at the Italian Meeting of Independent Record Labels and she received the De André Award for Best Emerging Artist.

Dolcenera participated again in the Sanremo Music Festival in 2006—when she sang the hit single "Com'è straordinaria la vita", included in the album Il popolo dei sogni—and in 2009, singing "Il mio amore unico", from her fourth studio set Dolcenera nel paese delle meraviglie, the first one released by a major label, Sony Music.

After signing with EMI, she released her fifth studio album in 2011, titled Evoluzione della specie. During the same year, she appeared on the Italian version of Professor Green's single "Read All About It (Tutto quello che devi sapere)", which was also included in the 2012 edition of Evoluzione della specie, released after Dolcenera's participation in the Sanremo Music Festival 2012 with "Ci vediamo a casa".

== Early life ==
Emanuela Trane was born in Galatina, province of Lecce, Italy, to Mimma and Gino Trane. She lived in Scorrano until the age of 18, when she moved to Tuscany, to study mechanical engineering at the University of Florence.

She started writing songs at the age of 14, and she later studied singing, clarinet and piano. In 1993, she founded the band I Codici Zero, together with Michele Vitulli, Francesco Cherubini, Emanuele Fontana and Francesco Sighieri. In the early 2000s she met through a web chat the Italian musician and record producer Lucio Fabbri, former member of the progressive rock band Premiata Forneria Marconi. Thanks to Fabbri, who later became her first producer, she obtained a recording contract with the independent record label Amarena Music.

== Music career ==
=== Sorriso Nucleare, the first album ===
Dolcenera's debut single, "Solo tu", was released in September 2002. The song allowed her to participate in the singing contest Destinazione Sanremo, broadcast on Rai 2 from 27 September 2002, with the purpose to choose 12 of the 16 newcomers participating to the 53rd Sanremo Music Festival. On 20 December 2002, during the final of the show, Dolcenera was announced one of the winners.

During the festival, held in May 2003, Dolcenera performed the song "Siamo tutti là fuori", later released as her second single. On 7 March 2003, Dolcenera won first place in the newcomers' section of the competition and she received the "Press, TV and Radio Award". The single, which peaked at number 10 on the Italian Singles Chart, was included in Dolcenera's debut album, Sorriso nucleare, released in March 2003. The album also spawned the singles "Devo andare al mare" and "Vivo tutta la notte".

In summer 2003, Dolcenera embarked on a concert tour throughout Italy, promoting her debut album.

=== Music Farm and the second studio album ===
In 2005, Dolcenera won the second edition of Music Farm, an Italian reality show, whose contestants were well-known or promising singers. During the live shows, she performed Italian and international songs, such as Loredana Bertè's "Sei bellissima" and Gloria Gaynor's "I Will Survive". She also sang for the first time "Mai più noi due", the first single from her second studio album titled Un mondo perfetto.

The album, released on 20 May 2005, peaked at number 4 on the Italian Albums Chart and was certified Platinum, selling more than 90,000 copies. In 2005 she also received the De André Award, the Leone d'Argento as "Musical Revelation of the Year" and she scooped "Best New Artist of the Year" at the MEI ("Meeting of Independent Record Labels").

=== Il popolo dei sogni and the tour in Germany ===
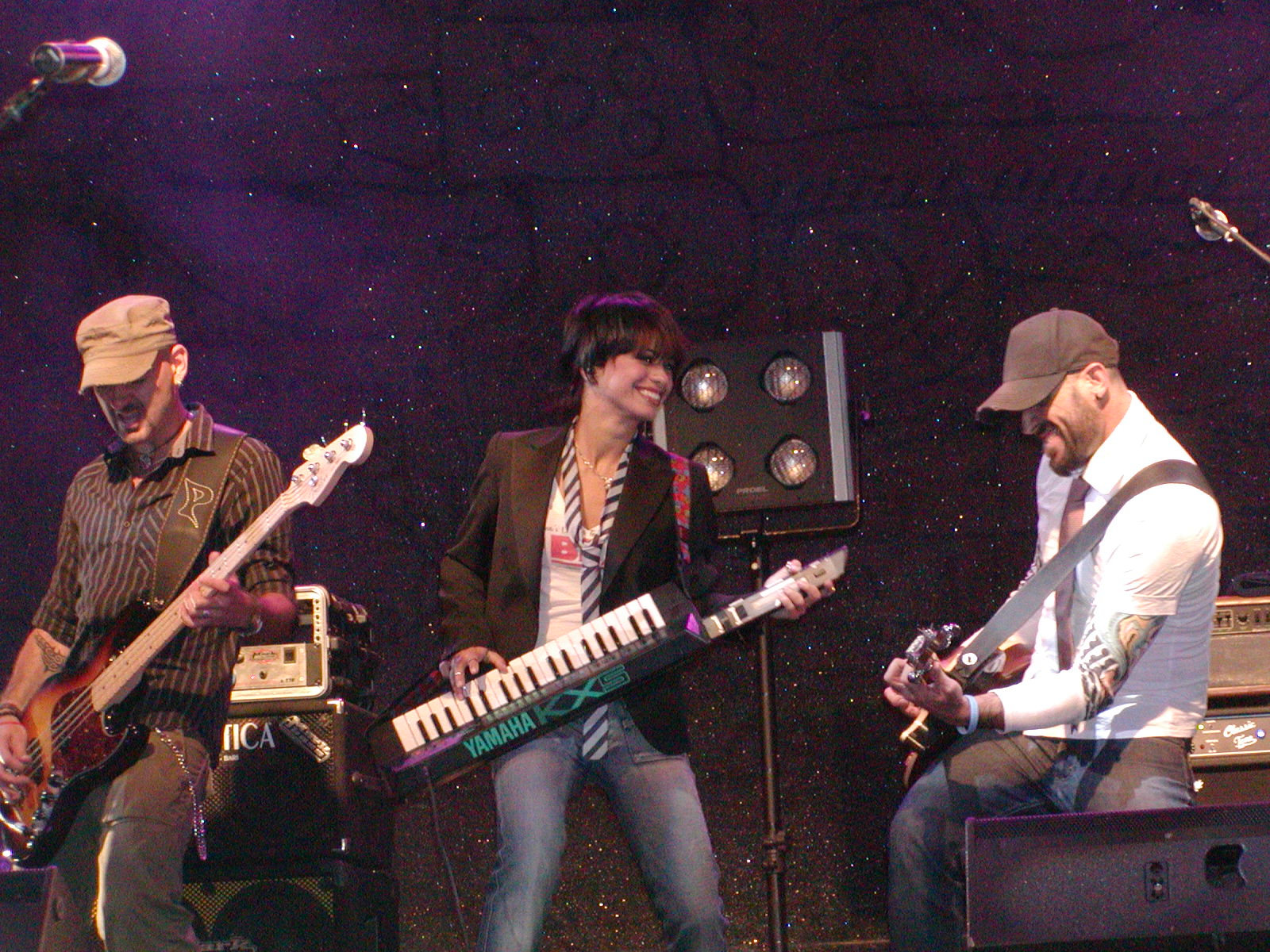
Dolcenera and her band during a concert in 2006

In 2006 Dolcenera participated in the 56th Sanremo Music Festival singing "Com'è straordinaria la vita", the lead single from her second album, titled Il popolo dei sogni. The album was certified Gold in the first week and it later received the Platinum certification in Italy.

In August 2006 she released Un mondo perfetto, a compilation album published in Germany, Austria and Switzerland only. The album includes songs from her previous Italian studio albums. On 30 March 2007 the album was re-released with additional bonus tracks, and it was supported by a tour in Germany.

=== Dolcenera nel paese delle meraviglie ===
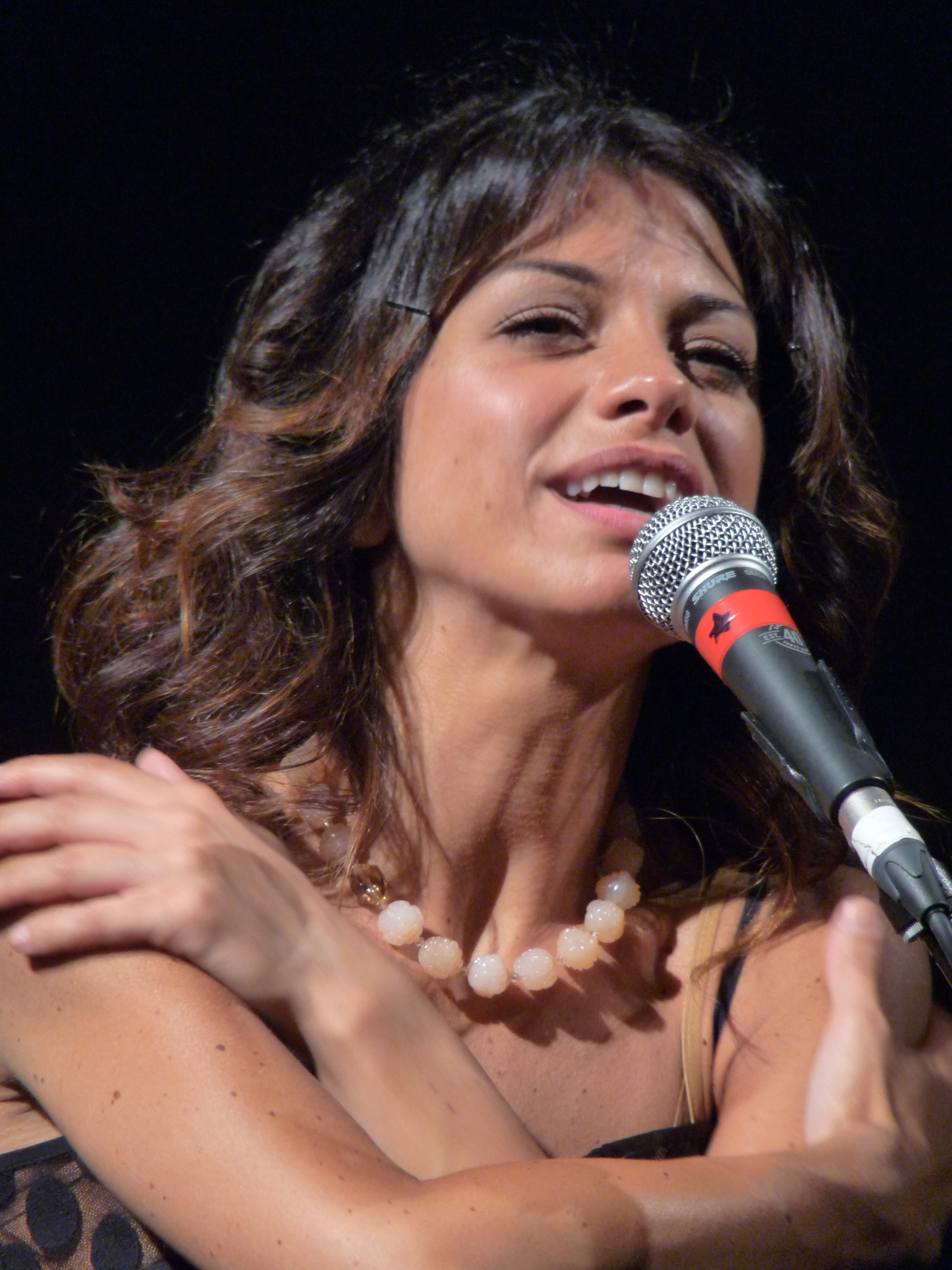
Dolcenera during a concert in Sanremo (Province of Imperia, Liguria) in 2009

In 2009 she signed a recording contract with Sony Music and she published her fourth studio album, titled Dolcenera nel paese delle meraviglie. The first single from the album, "Il mio amore unico", was performed during the 59th Sanremo Music Festival, competing in the "Artists" section, but it failed to reach the final. Despite the competition's outcome, the single was strongly aired by Italian radios, reaching the first position in the airplay chart and peaked at number 5 on the Italian Albums Chart. The other singles from the album are "La più bella canzone d'amore che c'è" and "Un dolce incantesimo".

In April 2009, she recorded the song "Domani 21/04.09" with the charity supergroup Artisti Uniti per l'Abruzzo, formed to raise money for the population struck by the earthquake in L'Aquila. To support the same population, in June 2009 she sang together with more than 40 Italian female singers at the San Siro Stadium. The event, organized by Laura Pausini, was titled Amiche per l'Abruzzo.

On 18 June 2009, she was the support act for Depeche Mode's concert in Milan, during their Tour of the Universe.

=== Evoluzione della specie ===
On 8 April 2011, Dolcenera released the single "Il sole di domenica", which was later included in her fifth studio album, Evoluzione della specie, recorded from June to November 2010 and released on 17 May 2011 by EMI Music Italy. The Evoluzione della specie tour started on 9 June 2011 in Falcade, province of Belluno (Veneto).

The second single from the album, "L'amore è un gioco", was released on 26 August 2011. To promote the music video for the song, starring four Playboy Playmates, Dolcenera appeared on the cover of the Italian version of the men's magazine Playboy. On 12 November 2011, Dolcenera embarked on a new leg of her tour, performing in theaters throughout Italy.

She also featured on the Italian version of Professor Green's song "Read All About It (Tutto quello che devi sapere)", included in British rapper's second studio album, At Your Inconvenience, and released as a digital single on 9 December 2011.

In February 2012, Dolcenera participated in the 62nd Sanremo Music Festival, placing sixth with the song "Ci vediamo a casa", written for the soundtrack of Maurizio Ponzi's film with the same title. The song was included on the 2012 version of her fifth album, Evoluzione della specie², released on 15 February 2012. On 16 February 2012, during the third night of the Festival, she dueted with Professor Green in "My Life Is Mine", a cover version of "Vita spericolata" by Vasco Rossi.

In March 2012, Dolcenera received a TRL Awards nomination in the category Italians Do It Better. In April 2012, she will embark on the Ci vediamo in tour, promoting her fifth studio album throughout Italy.

=== Le stelle non tremano and The Voice of Italy ===
Dolcenera's sixth studio album, Le stelle non tremano, was released in 2015, preceded by the singles "Niente al mondo", "Accendi lo spirito", "Fantastica", and "Un peccato". In 2016, she competed in the 66th Sanremo Music Festival with the song "Ora o mai più (Le cose cambiano)". Her entry placed 15th in the final. Shortly after, Dolcenera was a coach on the fourth season of The Voice of Italy. Alice Paba, a member of Dolcenera's team, ultimately won the competition.

=== Regina Elisabibbi and Anima Mundi ===
In 2018, Dolcenera released the extended play Regina Elisabibbi, featuring covers of Italian trap songs, re-arranged as piano and voice ballads. The following year, she endorsed a Greenpeace campaign against marine plastic pollution, recording the song "Amaremare". The song was released as a single and its music video received the Roma Videoclip award.

In 2022 Dolcenera was a coach on Italian talent show The Band, broadcast by Rai 1 and hosted by Carlo Conti. In December of the same year, she released the album Anima Mundi.

=== Pechino Express and San Marino Song Contest ===
In 2025 Dolcenera was a contestant of Italian reality show Pechino Express, competing as part of runner-up couple I complici, together with her partner Gigi Campanile. In 2026 she competed in the San Marino Song Contest with the song "My Love", receiving the Jury Award and the SIAE award. The song was released as a single on 10 April 2026, and its music video received a special award at the Rome Videoclip Awards.

== Actress career ==
Dolcenera's first acting role was a cameo appearance in Il nostro messia, a 2008 comedy directed by Claudio Serughetti. In 2008 she starred alongside Cristiana Capotondi, Primo Reggiani and Ludovico Fremont in the movie Scrivilo sui muri, directed by Giancarlo Scarchilli.

== Discography ==
Studio albums

- Sorriso nucleare (2003)
- Un mondo perfetto (2005)
- Il popolo dei sogni (2006)
- Dolcenera nel paese delle meraviglie (2009)
- Evoluzione della specie (2011)
- Le stelle non tremano (2015)
- Anima Mundi (2022)

== Filmography ==
Film
Year	Title	Role	Notes
2006	Il nostro messia	Taxi driver	Cameo appearance
2007	Scrivilo sui muri	Benny	

== Awards and nominations ==
Year	Award	Nomination	Work	Result
2003	Sanremo Music Festival	Newcomers	"Siamo tutti là fuori"	Won
2003	Sanremo Music Festival	Newcomers' Press, Radio & TV Award	"Siamo tutti là fuori"	Won
2005	De André Award	Best Emerging Artist	Herself	Won
2005	M.E.I. Award	Best Emerging Artist	Herself	Won
2005	Leone d'Argento Award	Musical Revelation of the Year	Herself	Won
2006	Venice Music Awards	The Best Voice	Herself	Won
2009	Lunezia Award	Lunezia for Sanremo Award	"Il mio amore unico"	Won
2009	Venice Music Awards	Female Artist of the Year	Herself	Won
2009	Venice Music Awards	Top Radio Award	"Il mio amore unico"	Won
2009	Premio Videoclip Italiano	Best Video by a Female Artist	"La più bella canzone d'amore che c'è"	Won
2010	Premio Amnesty Italia	Voices for Freedom	"Date a Cesare"	Nominated
2011	Premio Videoclip Italiano	Best Video by a Female Artist	"Il sole di domenica"	Nominated
2012	TRL Awards	Italians Do It Better	Herself	Nominated
2015	Lunezia Award	Special Mention Award	Herself	Won

Awards and achievements
Preceded by Anna Tatangelo with "Doppiamente fragili"	Sanremo Music Festival; Winner Newcomers section 2003	Succeeded by Laura Bono with "Non credo nei miracoli"
