= Sorriso =

Sorriso, Mato Grosso
- Municipality
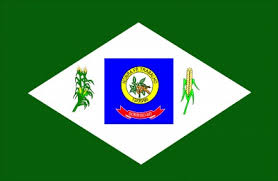
- Flag
- Nickname: Capital Nacional do Agronegócio (The National Capital of Agribusiness)
- Location of Sorriso in Mato Grosso

- Location in Brazil
- Coordinates: 12°32′42″S 55°42′39″W
- Country: Brazil
- Region: Center-West
- State: Mato Grosso
- Mesoregion: Norte Mato-Grossense
- City Established: May 13, 1986

Government
  - Mayor: Alei Fernandes

Area
  - Total: 3,608.416 sq mi (9,345.755 km^{2})
- Elevation: 1,198 ft (365 m)

Population (2022 Census)
  - Total: 110,635
  - Estimate (2025): 124,665
  - Density: 30.6603/sq mi (11.8380/km^{2})
- Time zone: UTC−4 (AMT)
- Demonym: sorrisense

Sorriso is a municipality in the state of Mato Grosso in the Central-West Region of Brazil. The name of the city means literally "smile", but it actually came from the Italian immigrants who only cultivated rice in the region: "only rice" = "só riso". The words ended up merging themselves to form the name of the city.

The city is served by Adolino Bedin Regional Airport.

== Arrest of drug lord Luiz Carlos da Rocha aka. "White Head" ==
One of South America's biggest drug lords, Luiz Carlos da Rocha aka. "White Head" was arrested in Sorriso between June 30 and July 1st 2017 by Brazilian Federal Police that commented that he was living "a normal social life and had no worries about being arrested".

== See also ==
- List of municipalities in Mato Grosso
