= Sorriso Airport =

Adolino Bedin Regional Airport Aeroporto Regional Adolino Bedin

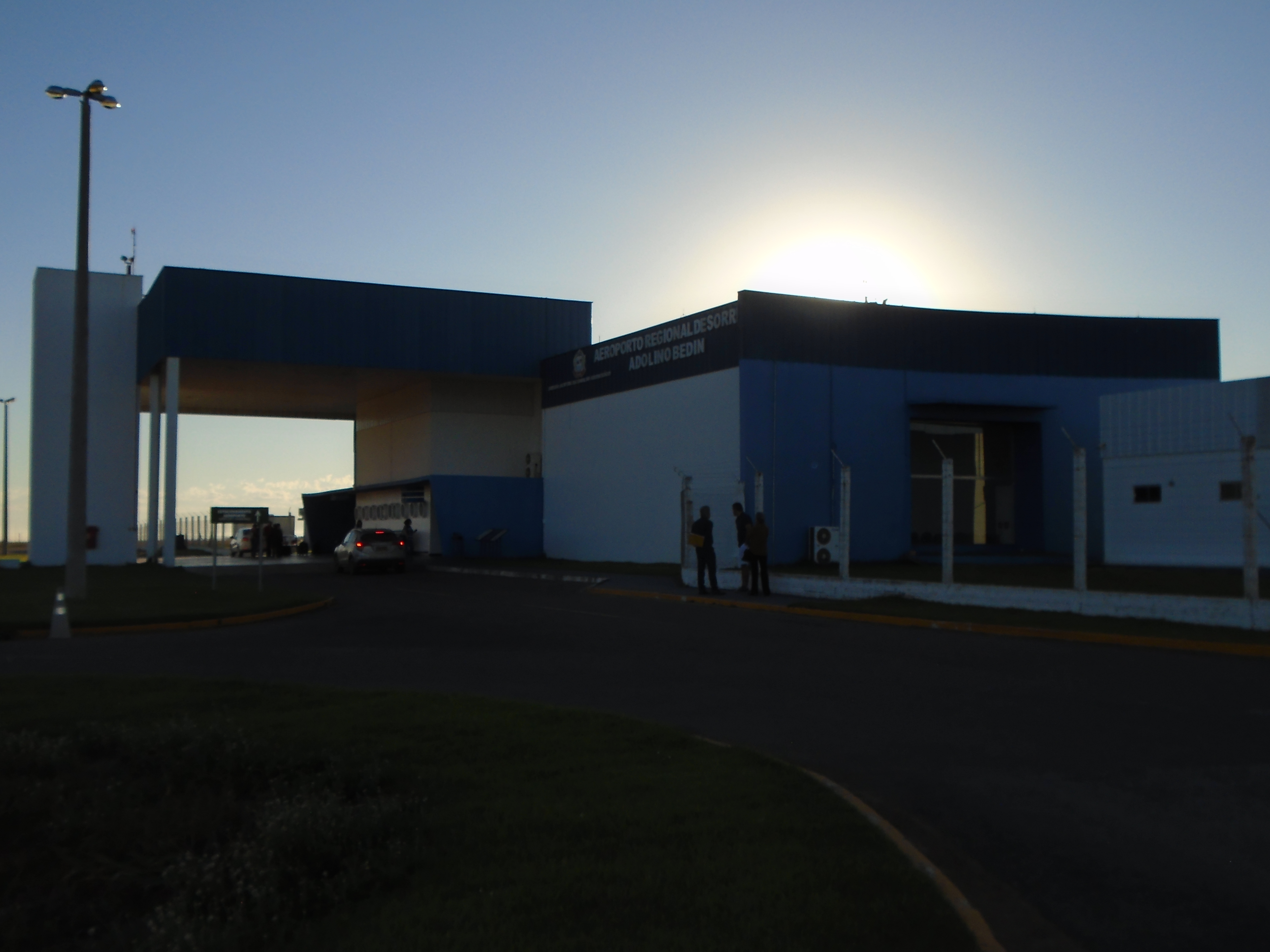
- IATA: SMT; ICAO: SBSO; LID: MT0005

Summary
- Airport type: Public
- Operator: Infraero (2022–present)
- Serves: Sorriso
- Opened: 20 June 2016; 10 years ago
- Time zone: BRT−1 (UTC−04:00)
- Elevation AMSL: 386 m (1,266 ft)
- Coordinates: 12°28′22″S 055°40′08″W
- Website: www4.infraero.gov.br/aeroporto-sorriso/

Map
- Location in Brazil

Runways
Direction	Length		Surface
Direction	m	ft	Surface
05/23	1,700	5,577	Asphalt

Statistics (2025)
- Passengers: 53,710 ▲12%
- Aircraft Operations: 1,611 ▼26%
- Metric tonnes of cargo: 220 ▲1%
- Statistics: Infraero; Sources: Airport Website, ANAC, DECEA

Adolino Bedin Regional Airport (IATA: SMT, ICAO: SBSO) is the airport serving Sorriso, Brazil.

It is operated by Infraero.

== History ==
The airport was opened on June 20, 2016.

On February 24, 2022, Infraero became the concessionary of the airport.

== Airlines and destinations ==
Airlines	Destinations
Azul Brazilian Airlines	Campinas

== Access ==
The airport is located 12 km (7 mi) from downtown Sorriso.

== See also ==
- List of airports in Brazil
