= Bandabardò =

Italian folk band

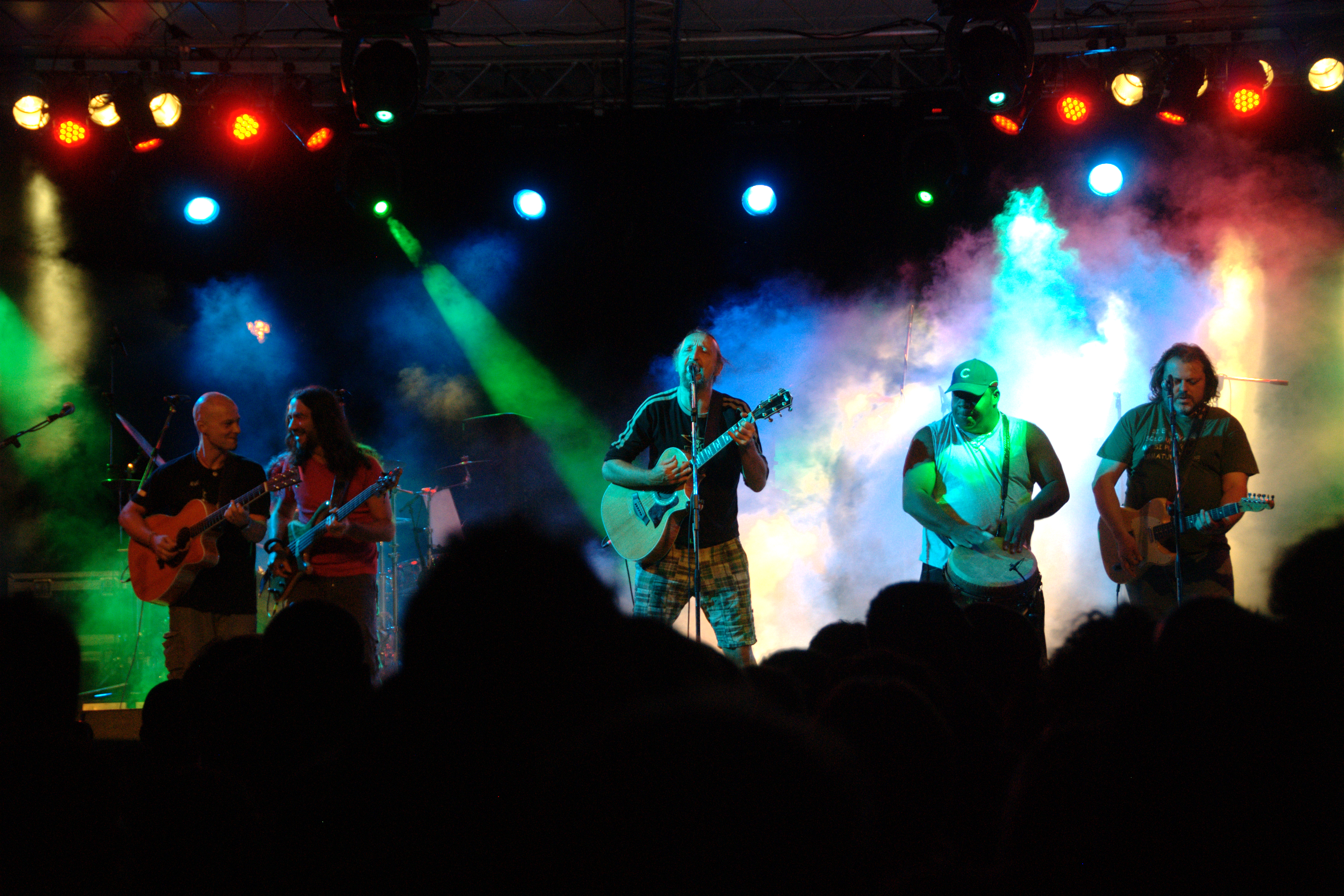
- Bandabardò performing at the Levico Lake Festival, Levico Terme, in July 2010

Background information
- Origin: Florence, Italy
- Genres: Acoustic folk rock
- Years active: 1993–present
- Labels: OTR, Cockney Music, BMG Ricordi, Warner Music Group
- Members: Finaz, Orla, Nuto, Don Bachi, Ramon, Pacio
- Past members: Paolino, Erriquez
- Website: www.bandabardo.it

Bandabardò is an Italian folk band. It was formed in 1993. Bandabardò is noted as a live band. Their album Tre Passi Avanti charted at No. 7 in Italy the week of its release, and Bondo! Bondo! charted at No. 10.

Members include Enrico Greppi, called Erriquez (vocals and guitar), Alessandro Finazzo (voice and guitar), Marco Bachi (bass), Andrea Orlandini (keyboard), Alessandro Nutini (percussion), and Jose Ramon Caravallo Arma (percussion and trumpet). The band hails from Florence, and members have spoken about the state of live music in their city. Erriquez died on the morning of 14 February 2021, at the age of 60 from cancer.

== Band members ==
Actual members

- Finaz (Alessandro Finazzo) – vocals, acoustic, semi-acoustic, electric guitar, backing vocals
- Don Bachi (Marco Bachi) – bass, double bass
- Orla (Andrea Orlandini) – guitar, backing vocals
- Nuto (Alessandro Nutini) – drums
- Ramon (Jose Ramon Caraballo Armas) – percussion, trumpet, backing vocals
- Pacio (Federico Pacini) – keyboards, backing vocals

Ex members

- Erriquez (Enrico Greppi) – vocals, guitar, ukulele (1993-2021)
- Paolino (Paolo Baglioni) – percussion, keyboards (1993-2002)

== Discography ==
- 1996 – Il circo mangione
- 1998 – Iniziali bì-bì
- 2000 – Mojito Football Club
- 2002 – Bondo! Bondo!
- 2004 – Tre passi avanti
- 2008 – Ottavio
- 2010 – Allegro ma non troppo
- 2010 – Sette x uno
- 2011 – Scaccianuvole
- 2014 – L'improbabile
- 2022 – Non fa paura

== Filmography ==
- 2004 - bandabardò: Vento in faccia
- 2016 - bandabardò, un mistero italiano

== Tours ==
- 1993/95 - Bandabardò Tour
- 1996/97 - Il circo mangione Tour
- 1998/99 - Iniziali bì-bì Tour
- 1999/2000 - Barbaro Tour
- 2000/01 - Mojito F.C. Tour
- 2002/03 - Bondo! Bondo! Tour
- 2004/05 - Tre passi avanti Tour
- 2006/07 - Fuori Orario Tour
- 2008/09 - Ottavio in Tour
- 2010/11 - German Tour
- 2011/12 - Scaccianuvole Tour
- 2014/15 - L’improbabile Tour
- 2016/17 - Lo sciopero del sole Tour
- 2017/18 - BB Tour
- 2018/19 - 25th Tour
- 2019/20 - BB Tour
- 2022/23 - Non fa paura Tour
- 2023/24 - Se mi rilasso collasso Tour
- 2024/25 - Ultimo Tango Tour
