= Sorriso nucleare =

Studio album by Dolcenera
- Released: March 2003
- Recorded: 2002–2003
- Genre: Pop
- Length: 41:49
- Language: Italian
- Label: Amarena Music / BMG Ricordi
- Producer: Lucio Fabbri

Dolcenera chronology
Sorriso nucleare (2003)	Un mondo perfetto (2005)

Singles from Sorriso nucleare
- 1. "Solo tu" Released: November 2002; 2. "Siamo tutti là fuori" Released: March 2003; 3. "Devo andare al mare" Released: June 2003; 4. "Vivo tutta la notte" Released: 2004

Sorriso nucleare is the debut album by Italian singer-songwriter Dolcenera, released in March 2003 by Amarena Music/BMG Ricordi and produced by Lucio Fabbri.

The album was preceded by the single "Solo tu". The second single, "Siamo tutti là fuori", was the winner of the newcomer artists' section of the Sanremo Music Festival in 2003 and also won the "Press, TV and Radio Award". The album also includes a cover of the song "Piccola stella senza cielo", written and originally performed by Luciano Ligabue.

Sorriso nucleare failed to chart in the Italian Top 20.

== Track listing ==
No.	Title	Writer(s)	Length
1.	"Devo andare al mare"	Dolcenera, Francesco Sighieri, Francesco Cherubini	3:28
2.	"Dolcissimo (Eri proprio tu)"	Dolcenera	4:19
3.	"Vivo tutta la notte"	Dolcenera, Sighieri	3:34
4.	"Siamo tutti là fuori"	Dolcenera	4:11
5.	"Ansia metafisica"	Dolcenera	3:14
6.	"Sorriso nucleare"	Dolcenera	4:33
7.	"Solo tu"	Dolcenera	3:27
8.	"Nuda e cruda"	Dolcenera	3:59
9.	"Io mi piaccio"	Dolcenera	3:36
10.	"Vorrei tu fossi qui"	Dolcenera, Sighieri	3:37
11.	"Piccola stella senza cielo"	Luciano Ligabue	3:48

== Singles ==
- "Solo tu" was the first single to be released from the album in November 2002. The song allowed Dolcenera to participate in the singing contest Destinazione Sanremo, created to choose the contestants of the 53rd Sanremo Music Festival in the newcomer artists' section and broadcast on Rai 2.
- In March 2003, during the Sanremo Music Festival, "Siamo tutti là fuori" was released as the second single from the album. It peaked at number 10 on the Italian Singles Chart.
- The third single was "Devo andare al mare", released in June 2003 as a promo single only.
- The last promo single from the album was "Vivo tutta la notte", released in early 2004.

== Personnel ==
- Dolcenera — vocals, piano
- Roberto Gualdi – drums
- Lucio Fabbri – guitars, bass, Hammond organ, ARP 2600, mandolin, violin, viola, cello
- Francesco Sighieri – guitar, bass, programming (track 4)
- Maurizio Lotito – tammorra (track 4)
- Stefano Gottardis – drums (track 1)
