= Ci vediamo a casa =

Single by Dolcenera

from the album Evoluzione della specie²
- Released: 15 February 2012 (Italy)
- Recorded: Alairpark Studios (Cernusco sul Naviglio, Province of Milan)
- Genre: Pop, Pop rock
- Length: 3:59
- Label: K6DN Records, EMI Music
- Songwriter: Dolcenera
- Producer: Dolcenera

Dolcenera singles chronology
| "Read All About It (Tutto quello che devi sapere)" (2011) | "Ci vediamo a casa" (2012) | "Un sogno di libertà" (2012) |

Music video
- "Ci vediamo a casa" on YouTube

"Ci vediamo a casa" (English: See you at home) is a single by Italian singer Dolcenera, released by EMI Music Italy on 15 February 2012. It is included on the album Evoluzione della specie², a new edition of 2011's Evoluzione della specie. The song competed in the Sanremo Music Festival 2012, placing sixth in a field of fourteen. It is also the main song from the film of the same title, directed by Maurizio Ponzi.

After debuting at number nine on the Italian Singles Chart, the song peaked at number six during its second week and it was later certified platinum by the Federation of the Italian Music Industry, for domestic sales exceeding 30,000 units.

== Background and composition ==
The song, mainly inspired by the problems encountered by Dolcenera while trying to buy a home in Florence, was written by Dolcenera starting from June 2011. During the same period, Italian film-director Maurizio Ponzi sent to Dolcenera the screenplay from the film Ci vediamo a casa, which is based upon a similar story, asking her to write a song for its soundtrack. The track later became the main song from the film, scheduled to be released in Italy in April 2012.

The lyrics of the song are focused on the conditions of young generations in Italy during the economic crisis which began in 2008, describing the difficulties that a couple has to face while trying to get a place to live in together. According to Dolcenera, a home also represents the symbol of a shelter, an opportunity to build a life together with the loved man or woman. Cultural and economic problems are described by means of a lovestory.

== Sanremo Music Festival ==
On 15 January 2012, during the TV programme L'arena, Gianni Morandi announced the complete list of songs competing in the "Big Artists" section of the Sanremo Music Festival 2012, also including Dolcenera's "Ci vediamo a casa". Dolcenera performed the song for the first time on 14 February 2012, when she opened the competition during the first night of the festival. Following a technical problem in the voting process, all the songs were admitted to the second night of the show. The song was performed again the following day, being admitted to the semi-final, which was held on 17 February 2012. During the fourth night, Dolcenera sang the track in a duet with Max Gazzè, gaining access to the final, during which she placed sixth in the overall ranking.

During all Dolcenera's performances, the Sanremo Festival Orchestra was conducted by Fabio Gurian.

== Music video ==
The music video for the song was directed by Valentina Be.

It in addition features scenes from the film of the same title, directed by Maurizio Ponzi, that revolves around the problem of finding a home in which to live together by three very different couples.
In fact without any taboo and with much courage especially in Italy where the homosexuality is not widely accepted; the movie also recounts the relationship of a couple formed by the two gay cops interpreted by the young and beautiful Nicolas Vaporidis and Primo Reggiani.
The other two copies are interpreted by Italian actors Ambra Angiolini, Edoardo Leo, Giuliana De Sio, Myriam Catania and Giulio Forges Davanzati.

== Personnel ==
Music credits

- Dolcenera – vocals, piano, synthesizer, minimoog, theremin
- Roberto Gualdi – drums, percussions
- Antonio Petruzzelli – bass
- Mattia Tedesco – electric guitar

Production credits

- Michele Clivati – programming
- Dolcenera – producer
- Fabio Gurian – string arrangements
- Alessandro Malgioglio – engineer
- Cristian Milani – engineer
- Davide Nossa – assistant
- Roberto Vernetti – mixing, programming

== Charts ==
=== Weekly charts ===
Weekly chart performance for "Ci vediamo a casa"
| Chart (2012) | Peak position |
|---|---|
| Italy (FIMI) | 6 |

=== Year-end charts ===
Year-end chart performance for "Ci vediamo a casa"
| Chart (2012) | Rank |
|---|---|
| Italy (FIMI) | 58 |

== Release history ==
| Region | Date | Format | Label |
|---|---|---|---|
| Italy | 15 February 2012 | Radio airplay | K6DN Records, Emi Music Italy |
| Italy | 15 February 2012 | Digital download | K6DN Records, Emi Music Italy |
