= Il mio amore unico =

Single by Dolcenera

from the album Dolcenera nel paese delle meraviglie
- Released: 18 February 2009 (Italy)
- Recorded: Sonoria Recording Plant (Prato, Italy)
- Genre: Pop, Pop rock
- Length: 3:59
- Label: Sony Music, Columbia
- Songwriters: Dolcenera, Saverio Lanza, Gian Piero Ameli, Oscar Avogadro
- Producers: Dolcenera, Roberto Vernetti

Dolcenera singles chronology
"Piove (Condizione dell'anima)" (2007)	"Il mio amore unico" (2009)	"La più bella canzone d'amore che c'è" (2009)

Music video
- "Il mio amore unico" on YouTube

"Il mio amore unico" (English: My only love) is a song by Italian singer Dolcenera, released in 2009 as the lead single from her fourth studio album, Dolcenera nel paese delle meraviglie. The song competed in the Sanremo Music Festival 2009, being eliminated in the semi-final of the show. Despite this, it became a radio hit and a commercial success in Italy, peaking at number five on the Italian Singles Chart.

On 23 July 2009, the song received the Lunezia Award for Sanremo, for its "musical-literary value".

== Background ==
The song, produced by Dolcenera and Roberto Vernetti, was written by Dolcenera herself, together with Saverio Lanza, Gian Piero Ameli and Oscar Avogadro. Its lyrics are about a three-way love affair, in which a woman lives a "totalizing love" with a man, who is also involved with another woman.

== Sanremo Music Festival ==
On 22 December 2008, it was announced that the song was chosen among the 104 submitted entries as one of the sixteen participants in the 59th Sanremo Music Festival. Dolcenera sang it for the first time on 17 February 2009, when she was the first singer in the "Big Artists" section to perform during the opening night of the contest. After being admitted to the second night, Dolcenera performed it again on the following day, when she was announced as one of the artists competing in the semi-final of the contest. During the semi-final, held on 20 February 2009, Dolcenera performed the song in a duet with Italian singer Syria, but she was eliminated from the competition.

== Reception ==
The single debuted and peaked at number five on the Italian Top Digital Download Chart, compiled by the Federation of the Italian Music Industry. After holding the fifth spot during its second week, the song completed a ten weeks long chart run in the Italian top twenty, later ranking 40th on the 2009 year-end chart released by FIMI. The song has sold 35.000 copies in Italy.

Five weeks after its release, the song also reached the first spot in the Italian airplay chart compiled by Music Control, holding it for three consecutive weeks.

== Music video ==
The music video for the song was directed by Gaetano Morbioli.

== Usage in media and other versions ==
The song was featured on the soundtrack of Federico Moccia's film Amore 14, released in 2009.

On 22 June 2009, Dolcenera performed the song live during the mega-concert Amiche per l'Abruzzo, organized by Laura Pausini in order to raise funds for the victims of the 2009 L'Aquila earthquake. The performance was also included in the DVD recorded during the concert, released on 22 June 2010.

In 2009, a remix version of the song was released in the United Kingdom. Remixed by Milan-based DJs Reset!, the new version of the song was titled "Il mio amore unico - Reset! Sconvolgermi". During the same year, Mexican singer Alejandra Guzmán recorded a Spanish-language cover of the song, titled "Único (Il mio amore unico)" and included in her album Único.

== Charts ==
=== Peak positions ===
Chart (2009)	Peak position
Italy (FIMI)	5

=== Year-end charts ===
Chart (2009)	Position
Italy (FIMI)	40
