= Dolcenera nel paese delle meraviglie =

Studio album by Dolcenera
- Released: 20 February 2009
- Recorded: June – October 2008
- Studio: Sonoria Recording Plant, Prato
- Genre: Pop, rock
- Length: 49:07
- Language: Italian
- Label: Sony Music, Columbia Records
- Producer: Roberto Vernetti, Dolcenera

Dolcenera chronology
Il popolo dei sogni (2006)	Dolcenera nel paese delle meraviglie (2009)	Evoluzione della specie (2011)

Singles from Dolcenera nel paese delle meraviglie
- 1. "Il mio amore unico" Released: 18 February 2009; 2. "La più bella canzone d'amore che c'è" Released: 22 May 2009; 3. "Un dolce incantesimo" Released: 7 August 2009

Dolcenera nel paese delle meraviglie is the fourth studio album by Italian singer Dolcenera, released on 18 February 2009. It is her first album released on Sony Music Italy. The lead single from the album, "Il mio amore unico", became the most successful single by Dolcenera so far, peaking at number five on the Italian Singles Chart and reaching the top spot on the Italian airplay chart.

The album also spawned the singles "La più bella canzone d'amore che c'è" and "Un dolce incantesimo".

== Background and release ==
Dolcenera started working on the album in 2006, and the 12 tracks were recorded between June and October 2008 in Prato. The singer revealed in an interview that she wrote more than 70 songs for the album, and that she spent two months to define the final track list of the album.

In December 2008, it was announced that Dolcenera would participate in the 59th Sanremo Music Festival, competing in the section "Artisti" with the song "Il mio amore unico". She later revealed that the song was not initially intended to be sung during the popular singing contest; since the album was ready to be published in the days during which the Festival took place, her recording label suggested her to promote it through the Festival.

The title of the album was revealed in early February 2009 and the first single from the album, "Il mio amore unico", was performed for the first time on 17 February 2009, when it opened the competition in the San Remo Music Festival. The digital version of the album was released on 18 February 2009, while the Compact Disc edition was published two days later.

On 26 January 2010 the album was re-released in a pocket DBS version.

== Title and artwork ==
The title of the album, Dolcenera nel paese delle meraviglie (in English "Dolcenera in Wonderland") is clearly inspired by Lewis Carroll's novel Alice's Adventures in Wonderland. Moreover, the cover of the album represents the singer with several body painting tattoos, representing characters from the popular novel, such as the White Rabbit, and related symbols, including the four French playing card suits and a clock.

However, the title of the album was also inspired by Jeanette Winterson's book Written on the Body, published in 1992: in an interview, Dolcenera explained that the book contains the sentence "Love is Wonderland" and, since the album is mostly about love, she decided to title her album Dolcenera in Wonderland.

The album's artwork shows a significant change in Dolcenera's look: she explained that her dark-style make-up became a mask, because it represented her previous unease, but when she found out her peacefulness, she decided to stop using it.

== Composition and themes ==
Dolcenera nel paese delle meraviglie is defined by Dolcenera as a "concept album about love", considered both as the feeling between two partners, and as a general feeling that could be able to save people, driving them to fight and to keep hoping. Talking about the album, Dolcenera also claimed that love could be the feeling able to help the Western world to find out ideas to save itself from the late-2000s crisis.

The first single from the album, "Il mio amore unico", talks about a ménage à trois, but it is also a song about a great love between a woman and an unfaithful man, described as a boy whose appearance reminds Kurt Cobain's one.

The album has a pop-rock sound, with influences from the music of the 1970s. The songs are recorded with an orchestra, in order to soften their sound. The track "Giorni d'estate" is a cover of the song "Right Next to the Right One" by Tim Christensen.

== Track listing ==
No.	Title	Writer(s)	Length
1.	"La più bella canzone d'amore che c'è"	Dolcenera, Roberto Pacco, Lorenzo Imerico	4:22
2.	"Il mio amore unico"	Dolcenera, Saverio Lanza, Paolo Ameli, Oscar Avogadro	3:46
3.	"Un dolce incantesimo"	Dolcenera, Francesco Sighieri	4:19
4.	"Dolcemente come niente"	Dolcenera, Luca Monti	3:29
5.	"Chi decide..."	Dolcenera, Luca Chiaravalli, Stefaan Fernande, Lissette Alea	3:47
6.	"Date a Cesare"	Dolcenera	3:46
7.	"Un'emozione al giorno"	Dolcenera, Luca Chiaravalli	3:09
8.	"Come un sole splendido"	Dolcenera, Francesco Sighieri	4:35
9.	"Oltre le stelle"	Dolcenera, Francesco Sighieri	4:26
10.	"...Sei soltanto tu"	Dolcenera, L. Chiaravalli, S. Fernande, L. Alea	3:26
11.	"Giorni d'estate"	Dolcenera, Tim Christensen	3:47
12.	"Fino a domani"	Dolcenera, Piero Pelù	2:59

iTunes bonus track
No.	Title	Writer(s)	Length
13.	"Un giorno strano"	Dolcenera, Francesco Sighieri	3:22

== Personnel ==
- Dolcenera – piano, voice, producer, arrangements
- Roberto Vernetti – producer, arrangements, mixing
- Roberto Gualdi – drums, arrangements
- Antonio Petruzzelli – bass, arrangements
- Stefano Brandoni – guitar, arrangements
- Francesco Sighieri – guitar, arrangements
- Filippo Martelli & Oversea Orchestra – strings, arrangements
- Saverio Lanza – bass, guitar, programming, arrangements
- Paolo De Francesco – artwork
- Leonardo Baldini – photos
- Laura Masoni – photos (assistant)
- Andrea Carbone – body Painting
- Susanna Ausoni, Nicolò Cerioni – stylists
- Giovanna Cirillo, Diego Canicattì – hairstyle
- Just Cavalli – clothes
- Maria Grazia Bonarelli – make up
- Andrea Benassai – recording
- Francesco Baldi, Francesco Nisi – assistants
- Mike Marsh – mastering

== Charts ==
The album has sold 80.000 copies in Italy and it was certified platinum.

Chart (2009)	Peak position
Italian Albums Chart	13
