= Il sole di domenica =

Single by Dolcenera

from the album Evoluzione della specie
- Released: 8 April 2011 (Italy)
- Recorded: 2010
- Genre: Pop, Pop rock
- Length: 3:40
- Label: EMI Music
- Songwriters: Dolcenera, Alessandro Finazzo
- Producers: Dolcenera, Roberto Vernetti

Dolcenera singles chronology
"Un dolce incantesimo" (2009)	"Il sole di domenica" (2011)	"L'amore è un gioco" (2011)

Alternative cover
- Digital EP

"Il sole di domenica" is a single by Italian singer Dolcenera, released by EMI Music on 8 April 2011. It will be included in her fifth studio album, Evoluzione della specie, released in Italy on 17 May 2011. The song is written by Dolcenera with Alessandro Finazzo, and it is produced by Dolcenera and Roberto Vernetti. Dolcenera also arranged the song.

== Background and release ==
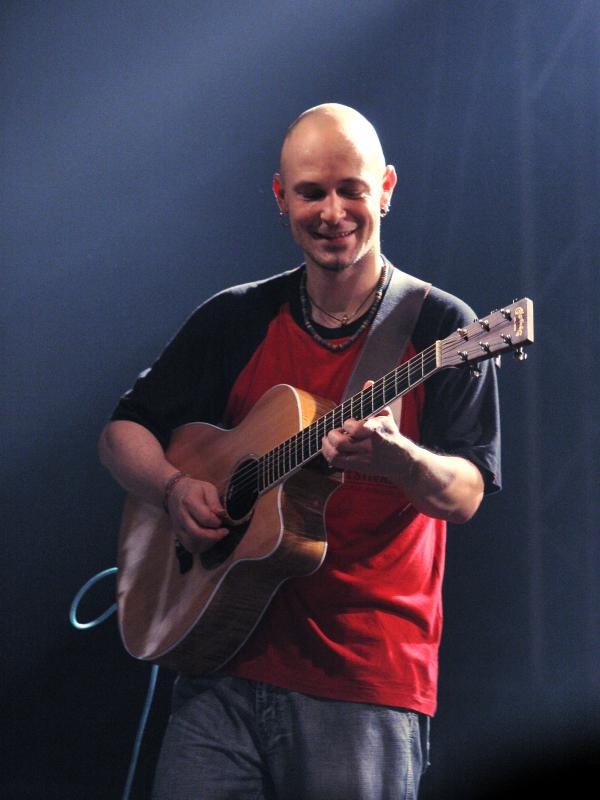
Alessandro Finazzo, co-writer of the song.

Dolcenera revealed the title of the single on 2 April 2011, through her Facebook profile. On 6 April 2011, Dolcenera also revealed the cover of the single, while on 8 April 2011 it was first aired by Italian radio stations.

It was officially released as a digital download on 8 April 2011 through iTunes. Starting from 15 April 2011, the song was released through other Italian digital stores.

== Composition, themes and recording ==
"Il sole di domenica" is a pop rock song with influences from electronic music. The song was recorded live by the whole band, and then mixed as if the recordings were obtained through computer programming.

Dolcenera explained the meaning of the song during an interview on 16 May 2011:

It is an invitation to be aware of our own personality, an invitation to our duty to express it, even if this could destroy our interior peace.

Dolcenera also claimed that she wanted to express a complex concept using a "positive" pop-sound:

There are a lot of disco-songs with rhythms similar to those of my songs, but when you go to the disco, you can hear only lines such as "on the floor", and I believe that, adding deeper concepts to these sentences, you could keep your brain in training, even when you are dancing on the floor.

== Music video ==
The music video was premiered on Corriere della Sera's website on 22 April 2011. Starting from 25 April 2011 it was published on Dolcenera's official YouTube channel and it was first aired by Italian musical televisions.

It was directed by Alex Orlowski and filmed in Barcelona. The video features contrasting frames, in order to highlight the contradictions of consumerist society. It is an invitation to viewers to be aware of themselves, so that they can feel to be close to the people they love.

== Track listing ==
Single

No.	Title	Writer(s)	Producer(s)	Length
1.	"Il sole di domenica"	Dolcenera, Alessandro Finazzo	Dolcenera, Roberto Vernetti	3:40

Il sole di domenica (Dolcenera vs. Restylers) — Digital EP

No.	Title	Version	Length
1.	"Il sole di domenica"	The Coolbrezers Radio Remix	3:03
2.	"Il sole di domenica"	The Coolbrezers Remix	4:52
3.	"Il sole di domenica"	Dave Elle & Kris Reen Radio Remix	3:18
4.	"Il sole di domenica"	Dave Elle & Kris Reen Remix	5:07
5.	"Il sole di domenica"	Angelo Cusano & J-Libe Radio Remix	3:21
6.	"Il sole di domenica"	Angelo Cusano & J-Libe Remix	5:10
7.	"Il sole di domenica"	Tony H & ILR Radio Remix	3:11
8.	"Il sole di domenica"	Tony H & ILR Remix	4:33
9.	"Il sole di domenica"	Lake Koast Radio Remix	3:10
10.	"Il sole di domenica"	Lake Koast Remix	5:44
11.	"Il sole di domenica"	Gabry Sangineto Radio Remix	3:27
12.	"Il sole di domenica"	Gabry Sangineto Vocal Remix	7:05
13.	"Il sole di domenica"	Gabry Sangineto Dub Remix	6:20
Total length:			58:21

== Charts ==
Chart (2011)	Peak position
Italy (FIMI)	36
Italy Airplay (Music Control)	3

== Release history ==
Region	Date	Format	Label
Italy	8 April 2011	Radio airplay	K6DN Records, Emi Music Italy
Italy	8 April 2011	Digital download	K6DN Records, Emi Music Italy
Italy	5 July 2011	Digital EP	K6DN Records, Emi Music Italy
