= Sei bellissima =

Single by Loredana Bertè

from the album Normale o Super
- B-side: "Spiagge di notte"
- Released: April 1975
- Genre: Pop
- Length: 4:50
- Label: CGD
- Songwriters: Claudio Fontana; Gian Pietro Felisatti

Loredana Bertè singles chronology
"Volevi un amore grande" (1974)	"Sei bellissima" (1975)	"Meglio libera" (1976)

"Sei bellissima" is a song recorded by Italian singer Loredana Bertè. It was released in April 1975 through Compagnia Generale del Disco and included on her second studio album Normale o super.

Written by Claudio Fontana and Gian Pietro Felisatti, during the years Bertè claimed to be the actual writer of the song, but that at the time she was unable to sign it as she was not a member of SIAE. According to Bertè, lyrics were inspired by her relationship with Adriano Panatta. The musical arrangement by Vince Tempera was inspired by Riccardo Cocciante's "Bella senz'anima".

The song premiered at the 1975 Un disco per l'estate, being eliminated from the competition; nevertheless, the single was a commercial success, peaking at the thirteenth place on the Italian singles chart. The song was the first hit for Bertè, following the commercial failure of her debut album Striking.

The verse "a letto mi diceva sempre non vali che un po' più di niente" (i.e. "in bed he used to say 'you are not worth a bit more than anything'") was initially censored and replaced by "e poi mi diceva sempre non vali che un po' più di niente" ("and then he used to say 'you are not worth a bit more than anything'"). A version with the original lyrics was eventually released the same year.

== Track listing ==
- 7" single – CGD 3247

A "Sei bellissima" (Claudio Daiano, Gian Pietro Felisatti) – 4:50
B "Spiagge di notte" (Daniele Pace) – 3:00

== Charts ==
Chart	Peak position
Italy (Musica e dischi)	10
