= Lucio Fabbri =

Italian musician, conductor and composer

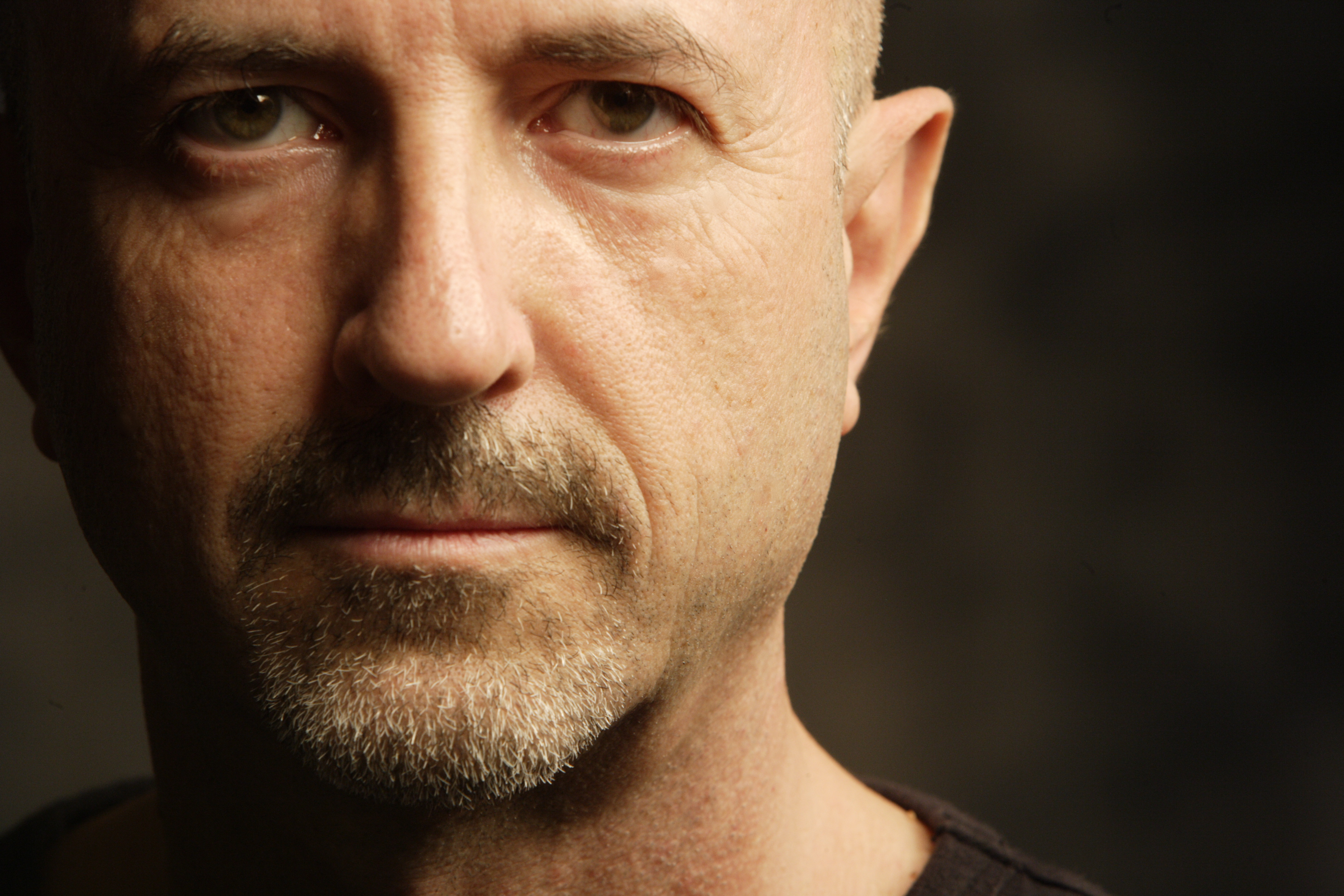
- Lucio Fabbri in 2007
- Born: 25 March 1955 (age 70); Crema, Italy

Lucio Fabbri (born 25 March 1955) is an Italian composer, conductor, arranger, producer and multi-instrumentalist.

Born in Crema, Lombardy, Fabbri graduated in violin and then in the early 1970s he was a member of the progressive rock groups Il Pacco and Piazza delle Erbe. After these experiences he worked as a session musician for several artists, including Roberto Vecchioni, Claudio Rocchi, and Eugenio Finardi, with whom he composed the hit "La radio".

In 1978 Fabbri made his solo debut with the instrumental album Amarena, and the same year he became a member of Premiata Forneria Marconi as violinist and keyboardist. Starting from the 1980s he devoted himself to arranging and conducting, notably collaborating with Matia Bazar, Paul Young, Umberto Tozzi, Mika, Paola & Chiara, Miguel Bosé, Milva, Kid Creole & The Coconuts, Gianni Morandi, Enzo Jannacci, Fiorella Mannoia, Giorgio Faletti, Giusy Ferreri, Howard Jones, Ivan Graziani, Marco Mengoni, Massimo Ranieri, Max Pezzali, Chiara, Negrita, Nik Kershaw, Captain Sensible and Tony Hadley.

Fabbri also composed the music for several videogames and commercials, and produced several artists, notably Dolcenera.
