= Kurac, pička, govno, sisa =

Live album by Rambo Amadeus
- Released: 1993
- Recorded: 29 September 1992
- Venue: Concert, Skopje, Macedonia
- Language: Serbian
- Label: Gema & DE

Rambo Amadeus chronology
Psihološko propagandni komplet M-91 (1991)	Kurac, pička, govno, sisa (1993)	Muzika za decu (1995)

Kurac, pička, govno, sisa (trans. Dick, Pussy, Shit, Tit) is the first live album by Rambo Amadeus, released in 1993. It was recorded on 29 September 1992 at a concert in Skopje, Macedonia. The album contains a number of improvisations of famous themes.

== Title ==
The title of the album and the first track came from the name of the secret organization KPGS, which Rambo Amadeus founded in 1987 with Nebojša Dudek and Saša Marković Mikrob. Its name is an acronym of Kurac! Pička! Govno! Sisa! which was created spontaneously in a telephone conversation between Marković and Dudek. KPGS is a "parody" of KPGT.

== Track listing ==
1. K.P.G.S. oda radosti
2. Bojler protiv bojlera
3. Karamba karambita
4. Električno oro
5. B-ton
6. Hej živote varalico stara
7. Mala, jebo te ja lično i personalno
8. Priatelju (Mrš. u pizdu materinu)
9. Mix No. 2745/12
10. Kataklizma komunizma
11. Opojne droge su opasne po mladi organizam
12. Prdež u kadi, dim na vodi
13. H.I.H.
14. Kraj
