= M91 =

M91 or M-91 may refer to:

- Various iterations of the Carcano, an Italian rifle
- M-91 (Michigan highway), a state highway in Michigan
- M91 rocket launcher, a 115mm, 45-tube, trailer mount for the M55 rocket used by the United States Army and United States Marine Corps
- McCarthy 91 function, a recursive function defined by the computer scientist John McCarthy as a test case for formal verification within computer science
- Messier 91, a barred spiral galaxy about 63 million light-years away in the constellation Coma Berenices
- Mosin Nagant Model 1891 Infantry Rifle, a Russian/Soviet rifle
- Psihološko propagandni komplet M-91, the third studio album released in 1991 by Montenegrin-Serbian musician Rambo Amadeus
- Zastava M91, a Serbian sniper rifle
