= Hoćemo gusle =

Studio album by Rambo Amadeus
- Released: November 10, 1989
- Genre: Electronic; funk; soul; rock; avantgarde; parody
- Label: PGP RTB
- Producer: Saša Habić; Digital Mandrak

Rambo Amadeus chronology
O tugo jesenja (1988)	Hoćemo gusle (1989)	Psihološko propagandni komplet M-91 (1991)

Professional ratings
Review scores
Source	Rating
Ritam	(unfavorable)

Hoćemo gusle (trans. We Want Gusle) is the second studio album released in 1989 by Montenegrin-Serbian musician Rambo Amadeus.

The track "Amerika i Engleska (biće zemlja proleterska)" was originally supposed to be named "Kataklizma komunizma" (Cataclysm of Communism) but powers that be would not allow it. The album title pokes fun at the anti-bureaucratic revolution protests in Montenegro that swept Milo Đukanović, Momir Bulatović, and Svetozar Marović into power. Protesters were heard chanting "Hoćemo Ruse" ("We want the Russians"), but when the authorities and state-controlled media criticized them for it, many quickly began backpedaling by claiming they actually chanted "Hoćemo gusle" ("We want the gusle").

Other songs like "Glupi hit" and afore mentioned "Balkan boj" would also become considerable hits and Rambo even received solid critical acclaim for chances he took in "Samit u buregdžinici Laibach". On that track, he created a catchy hybrid by mixing the heavy sound of Laibach with poetry from Laza Kostić and Desanka Maksimović, as well as with the folk kafana standard "Čaše lomim" and his own turbo-poetry. Album sleeve lists the lyrics of a song that was not actually recorded and explains that "it was dropped at the last moment because there was no room for it" but gives assurances it would appear on the next album. Since the song in question, named "Pegepe ertebe", was all about taking shots at Rambo's label PGP RTB it is not surprising that it did not appear on the next, or any subsequent album for that matter.

== Track listing ==
All songs by Rambo Amadeus except A5 and B1 whose lyrics were written by Zlatko Tarle.

Side A
No.	Title	Length
1.	"Glupi hit"	4:25
2.	"Free Mendela"	3:58
3.	"Santa Maria"	4:12
4.	"Balkan boj"	4:13
5.	"Plomba za Zelenog Zuba"	1:39

Side B
No.	Title	Length
1.	"Sokolov Greben"	3:40
2.	"Samit u buregdžinici Laibach"	4:56
3.	"Amerika i Engleska (biće zemlja proleterska)"	3:50
4.	"Intelektualac"	3:03
5.	"Čovek sam, ženo"	2:44

== Personnel ==
- Backing Vocals — Sanja Čičanović
- Bass — Dejan Škopelja
- Drums — Relja Obrenović
- Guitar (Hm noise) — Predrag Guculj
- Guitar, vocals — Aleksandar Vasiljević, Rambo Amadeus
- Keyboards, sampler — Digital Mandrak
- Vocals (sample) — Rade Šerbedžija

== Legacy ==
In 2015 Hoćemo gusle album cover was ranked 76th on the list of 100 Greatest Album Covers of Yugoslav Rock published by web magazine Balkanrock.
