= Saša Marković =

Saša Marković may refer to:

- Saša Marković (basketball), basketball player for Panathinaikos B.C.
- Saša Marković (footballer, born 1971), Serbian football manager and former player
- Saša Marković (footballer, born 1991), football player born in 1991
- Saša Marković Mikrob, Serbian artist, journalist, radio host, social worker and performer
