= Saša Marković Mikrob =

Serbian journalist and artist (1959–2010)

- Saša Marković in a T-Shirt with the print of one of his drawings, and his name written in Cyrillic.
- Born: Saša Marković Nicknames: Mikrob; Mladoženja; Bambus; Ganeša; 21 October 1959; Belgrade, SFRY
- Died: 15 July 2010 (aged 50); Belgrade, Serbia
- Known for: Painting, performance art, music

Saša Marković – Mikrob (Serbian Cyrillic: Саша Марковић – Микроб, pronounced [saʃa markɔʋitɕ mikrɔb]; 21 October 1959 – 15 July 2010), also known as Mladoženja, Bambus and Ganeša was a Serbian artist, journalist, radio host, social worker, performer, and one of the major representatives of the Serbian alternative and contemporary art scene. He worked as a contributor for several newspapers and radio programs, and as a performer he played about fifty times in Serbia and abroad. As a specific character, Marković was an inspiration for a number of documentaries, and often appeared in music videos of Belgrade bands.

== Biography ==
Saša Marković was born in 1959. in Belgrade, where he studied Yugoslav literature and Serbo-Croatian language. From an early age he was engaged in different jobs – he was a graphic editor of the Student magazine, a guardian in the basement of the bank in the city center, chauffeur and courier at the embassy of one non-European country, political activist and founder of some opposition parties, attender of various courses, a manufacturer of toilet paper, book collector, journalist, radio host, editor of radio show Lepi ritam srca, a lecturer on the history of rock and roll, co-founder of the secret organization KPGS and co-founder Remont.

== Radio ==
From 1990, Marković worked on Radio B92 on the show Ritam srca (Rhythm of the heart), and since the end of the 1990s hosted and edited Lepi ritam srca (Beautiful rhythm of the heart), which was always beginning with his distinctive greeting Zdravo živo! (Note: An old Serbian greeting. In free translation Hello and be well!) In the show, Marković was "in a fun and optimistic way commenting on the reality, recommending concerts, exhibitions and other events", and from his collection he was choosing "music that could not be heard in other places." After that, up to 2006. he was working with Mićun Ristić on Radio SKC, and led Black Market – a show about the music and concert events in Belgrade. The name of the show came from the record market that was simultaneously taking place in the street in front of the Studentski kulturni centar. The show also had a live edition in DKSG, and in some other venues in the city. The show was canceled after Radio SKC had not received permission to broadcast on the contest of the Broadcasting Agency of the Republic of Serbia.

== Music ==
Marković was a rock and roll expert, with a rich record collection, of which he obtained his first single record when he was nine.

In 1987 his friend Nebojša Kandić – Dudek introduced him to then unknown Rambo Amadeus with whom they formed a secret organization KPGS. The name was an acronym of Kurac! Pička! Govno! Sisa! (Dick! Cunt! Shit! Tit!) which was spontaneously formed in a telephone conversation between Marković and Dudek. Within the KPGS group Marković participated in the Rambo Amadeus' album O tugo jesenja in 1988. The official PGP-RTS release of this album features Rambo Amadeus dressed in toga from the time of Amadeus on the front cover, and him again dressed as Rambo and on the back cover. A limited, 90 copies edition, appeared in a special cover made by Marković. The front is decorated with photocopies of pages that contain various references to turbo-folk, with the name Rambo Amadeus written in font similar to The Mouse Factory, while the back side is made in the form of comic strip collage, of the images from the photobooth. In 1993 Rambo Amadeus released album Kurac, Pička, Govno, Sisa that includes the song KPGS (Oda radosti).
