= Montenegro in the Eurovision Song Contest 2012 =

- Eurovision Song Contest 2012
- Participating broadcaster: Radio i Televizija Crne Gore (RTCG)
- Country: Montenegro
- Selection process: Internal selection
- Announcement date: Artist: 12 December 2011; Song: 15 March 2012

Competing entry
- Song: "Euro Neuro"
- Artist: Rambo Amadeus
- Songwriters: Rambo Amadeus

Placement
- Semi-final result: Failed to qualify (15th)

Participation chronology

Montenegro was represented at the Eurovision Song Contest 2012 with the song "Euro Neuro" written and performed by Rambo Amadeus, who were internally selected by the Montenegrin broadcaster Radio i televizija Crne Gore (RTCG) to represent the nation at the 2012 contest in Baku, Azerbaijan. In November 2011, RTCG announced that they would be returning to the Eurovision Song Contest after a two-year absence following their withdrawal in 2010 due to financial difficulties. Rambo Amadeus was announced as the Montenegrin representative on 12 December 2011, while his song, "Euro Neuro", was presented to the public in a television special on 15 March 2012. The song and its music video garnered international media exposure due to its references to stereotypical views of the Balkan Region and to the Euro area crisis.

Montenegro was drawn to compete in the first semi-final of the Eurovision Song Contest which took place on 22 May 2012. Performing as the opening entry for the show in position 1, "Euro Neuro" was not announced among the top 10 entries of the first semi-final and therefore did not qualify to compete in the final. It was later revealed that Montenegro placed fifteenth out of the 18 participating countries in the semi-final with 20 points.

== Background ==
Prior to the 2012 contest, Montenegro had participated in the Eurovision Song Contest as an independent nation three times since its first entry in its own right in 2007. To this point, Montenegro has yet to feature in a final. In 2009, the nation failed to qualify with the song "Just Get Out of My Life" performed by Andrea Demirović. The nation briefly withdrew from the competition between 2010 and 2011 citing financial difficulties as the reason for their absence.

The Montenegrin national broadcaster, Radio i televizija Crne Gore (RTCG), broadcasts the event within Montenegro and organises the selection process for the nation's entry. Following their two-year absence, RTCG confirmed that Montenegro would participate at the Eurovision Song Contest 2012 on 30 November 2011. Montenegro has used various methods to select the Montenegrin entry in the past, such as internal selections and televised national finals to choose the performer, song or both to compete at Eurovision. In 2009, the broadcaster has opted to internally select both the artist and song that would represent Montenegro, a procedure that continued for the selection of the 2012 entry.

== Before Eurovision ==
=== Internal selection ===
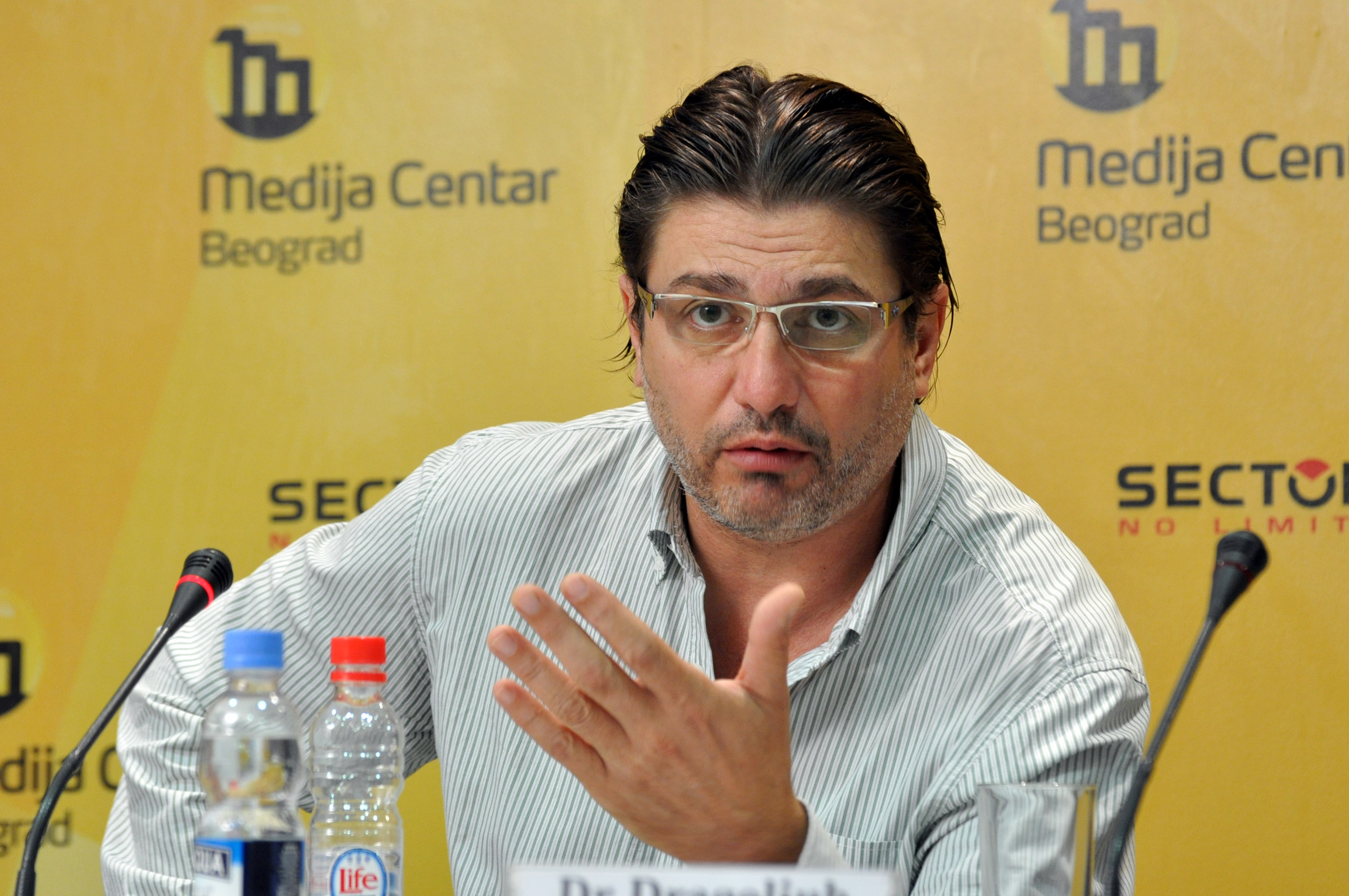
Rambo Amadeus was internally selected to represent Montenegro in the Eurovision Song Contest 2012

On 12 December 2011, RTCG announced that Rambo Amadeus would represent Montenegro in Baku. In regards to the selected artist, RTCG general director Rade Vojvodić stated: "He will be a good representative representing our country and the region. He's not the typical musician. There is one important fact that separates him from other musicians and makes him unique and distinguished. He is very popular throughout the former Yugoslavian countries, and he is a UNICEF ambassador. All this is a great recommendation, and a great opportunity for the promotion of Montenegro as a country."

The Montenegrin song, "Euro Neuro", was presented during a television special on 15 March 2012, which was held at the RTCG studios in Podgorica and hosted by Sabrija Vulić. The show was televised on TVCG 1 and TVCG SAT as well as broadcast online via the broadcaster's website rtcg.me. In addition to the presentation of the song, the show featured a guest appearance by Slovenian producer Magnifico who carried out production and mixing for the song during the production process, of which a lot was carried out in the Slovenian capital of Ljubljana. "Euro Neuro" was written by Rambo Amadeus himself. Amadeus recorded the music video for the song in Bar and Ulcinj and was directed by Miha Knific and Danijela Radovanović. The video, depicting Amadeus traveling through Montenegrin tourist destinations with a donkey, garnered international media exposure due to its references to stereotypical views of the Balkan Region and to the Euro area crisis as also reflected from the lyrics of the song; the singer stated that his entry was "directed to everyone feeling a bit nervous about not being able to understand things like the financial roots of the euro-zone crisis". The music video gained over 210,000 views on YouTube a day after it was released.

=== Promotion ===
Rambo Amadeus specifically promoted "Euro Neuro" as the Montenegrin Eurovision entry on 18 February 2012 by performing during the presentation show of the 2012 Croatian Eurovision entry, Dora 2012 - Idemo na Eurosong s Ninom!.

== At Eurovision ==
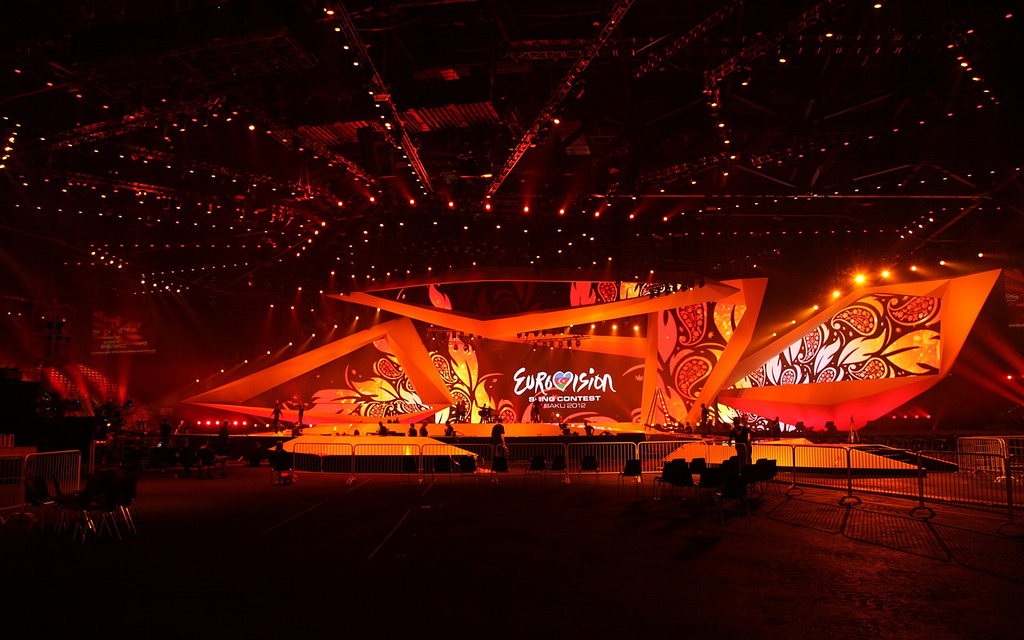
The Eurovision Song Contest 2012 took place at the Baku Crystal Hall in Baku, Azerbaijan

According to Eurovision rules, all nations with the exceptions of the host country and the "Big Five" (France, Germany, Italy, Spain and the United Kingdom) are required to qualify from one of two semi-finals in order to compete for the final; the top ten countries from each semi-final progress to the final. The European Broadcasting Union (EBU) split up the competing countries into six different pots based on voting patterns from previous contests, with countries with favourable voting histories put into the same pot. On 25 January 2012, a special allocation draw was held which placed each country into one of the two semi-finals, as well as which half of the show they would perform in. Montenegro was placed into the first semi-final, to be held on 22 May 2012, and was scheduled to perform in the first half of the show. The running order for the semi-finals was decided through another draw on 20 March 2012 and Montenegro was set to open the show and perform in position 1, before the entry from Iceland.

The two semi-finals and the final were broadcast in Montenegro on TVCG 1 and TVCG SAT with commentary by Dražen Bauković and Tamara Ivanković. The Montenegrin spokesperson, who announced the Montenegrin votes during the final, was Marija Marković.

=== Semi-final ===
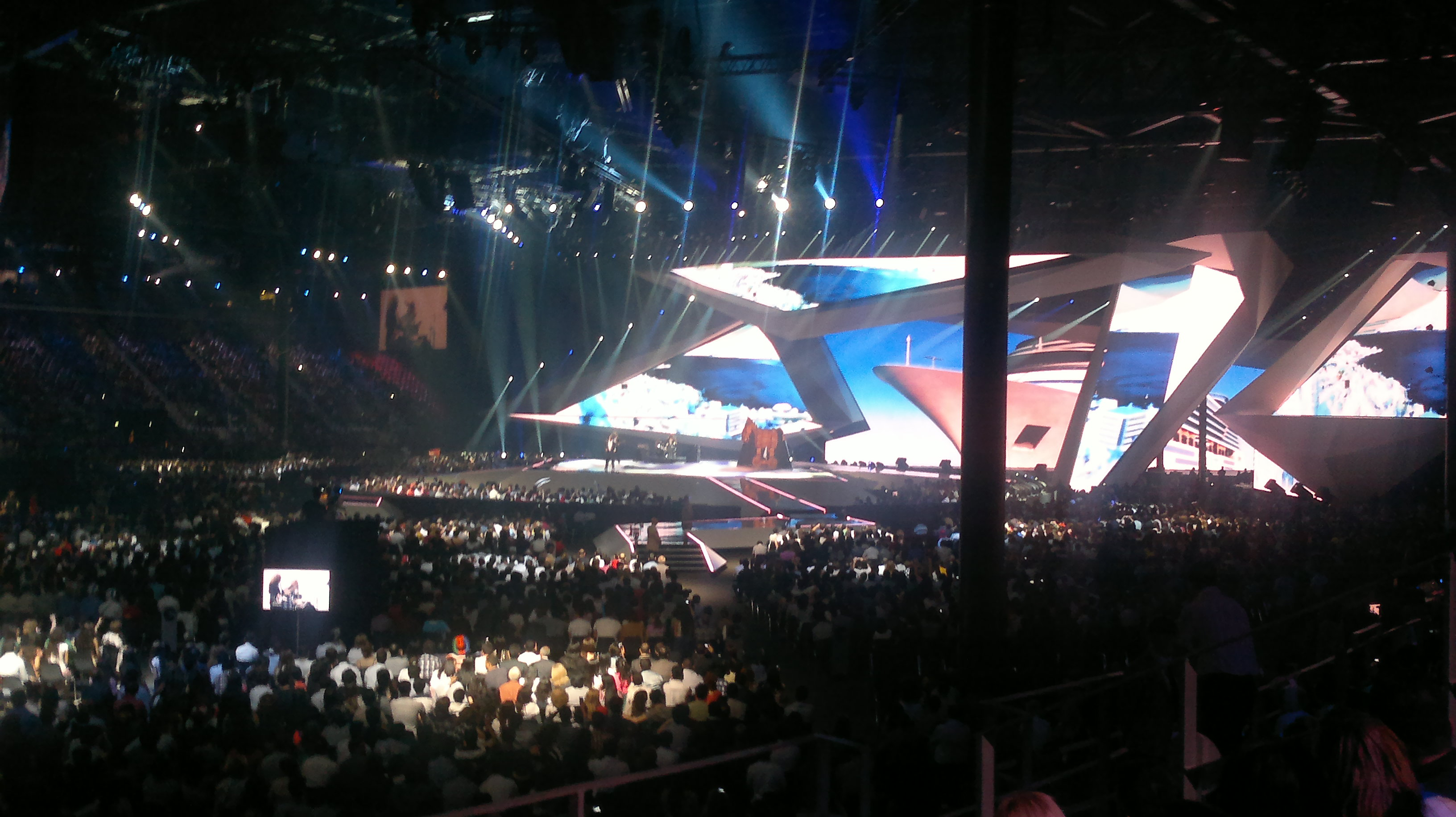
Rambo Amadeus performing during the first semi-final

Rambo Amadeus took part in technical rehearsals on 13 and 17 May, followed by dress rehearsals on 21 and 22 May. This included the jury show on 21 May where the professional juries of each country watched and voted on the competing entries.

The Montenegrin performance featured Rambo Amadeus performing on stage in a black cloak which he later stripped off to reveal a black suit with a white shirt underneath. Amadeus was also joined by three dancers that revealed red banners showing parts of the song lyrics during the performance, a bassist and a drummer. The stage also featured a trojan donkey with wheels and the LED screens displayed a Montenegrin scenery, a cruise ship and a lady sunbathing. The stage director for the performance was Draško Đurović and Rambo Amadeus' outfit was created by designer Verica Šoškić. The three dancers performing with Amadeus were Nikola Mijomanović, Todor Konjević and Vladimir Božović, while the two musicians were Igor Malesević and Miroslav Tovirac.

At the end of the show, Montenegro was not announced among the top 10 entries in the first semi-final and therefore failed to qualify to compete in the final. It was later revealed that Montenegro placed fifteenth in the semi-final, receiving a total of 20 points.

=== Voting ===
Voting during the three shows consisted of 50 percent public televoting and 50 percent from a jury deliberation. The jury consisted of five music industry professionals who were citizens of the country they represent. This jury was asked to judge each contestant based on: vocal capacity; the stage performance; the song's composition and originality; and the overall impression by the act. In addition, no member of a national jury could be related in any way to any of the competing acts in such a way that they cannot vote impartially and independently.

Following the release of the full split voting by the EBU after the conclusion of the competition, it was revealed that Montenegro had placed sixteenth with the public televote and fourteenth with the jury vote in the first semi-final. In the public vote, Montenegro scored 28 points, while with the jury vote, Montenegro scored 24 points.

Below is a breakdown of points awarded to Montenegro and awarded by Montenegro in the first semi-final and grand final of the contest. The nation awarded its 12 points to Albania in the semi-final and to Serbia in the final of the contest.

==== Points awarded to Montenegro ====
Points awarded to Montenegro (Semi-final 1)
Score	Country
12 points	Albania
10 points	
8 points	San Marino
7 points	
6 points	
5 points	
4 points	
3 points	
2 points	
1 point	

==== Points awarded by Montenegro ====
Points awarded by Montenegro (Semi-final 1)
Score	Country
12 points	Albania
10 points	Greece
8 points	Russia
7 points	Romania
6 points	Cyprus
5 points	Iceland
4 points	San Marino
3 points	Moldova
2 points	Latvia
1 point	Ireland

Points awarded by Montenegro (Final)
Score	Country
12 points	Serbia
10 points	Albania
8 points	Macedonia
7 points	Sweden
6 points	Bosnia and Herzegovina
5 points	Azerbaijan
4 points	Russia
3 points	Moldova
2 points	Italy
1 point	Lithuania
