= Vrh dna =

Studio album by Rambo Amadeus
- Released: 2015
- Label: Mascom

Rambo Amadeus chronology
Hipishizik Metafizik (2008)	Vrh dna (2015)	Brod budala (2020)

Vrh dna (The top of the bottom) is the eleventh album by Montenegrin singer Rambo Amadeus, released in 2015. The album contains 10 songs, including the hits "O'ruk, sad ga lomi" ("Ho-ruk, breaking it now"), "Privatizovat" ("Privatize"), "Duge donje gaće" ("Long underpants") and "Samo balade" ("Ballads only").

The album was released under Mascom Records.

== Background ==
In December 2010, a song called "Meni treba ritam jak" was released in collaboration with Dragoljub Đuričić. In 2012, he was internally selected as the representative of Montenegro at the Eurovision Song Contest in Baku with the song "Euro Neuro".

== Album ==
On this album, Rambo combined satirical lyrics about the fate of a small man in the whirlwinds of fate, wandering through the crooked riches of Balkan society. Vojno Dizdar, Miroslav Tovirac, Saša Ranković, Relja Svilar, Aleksandar Petković and others worked on this album.

It was followed by videos for the title track, "O ruk, sad ga lomi", "E moj Rambo", Privatizovat, "Partija", "Muzika", and "Samo balade".
