= Brod budala =

Studio album by Rambo Amadeus
- Released: April 2020 (Youtube) December 2020 (other streaming platforms) 2022 (limited edition vinyl)

Rambo Amadeus chronology
Vrh Dna (2015)	Brod budala (2020)

Brod budala (Ship of fools) is the twelfth album by Rambo Amadeus, released in 2020. The album was originally released on YouTube, and few months later on streaming platforms. In 2022, the album was released in a limited edition on vinyl.

Hits from this album include the title track, Oda radosti – anegdote evrointegracija (Ode to joy – European integration angedotes), Serator (Sucker)...

== Album ==
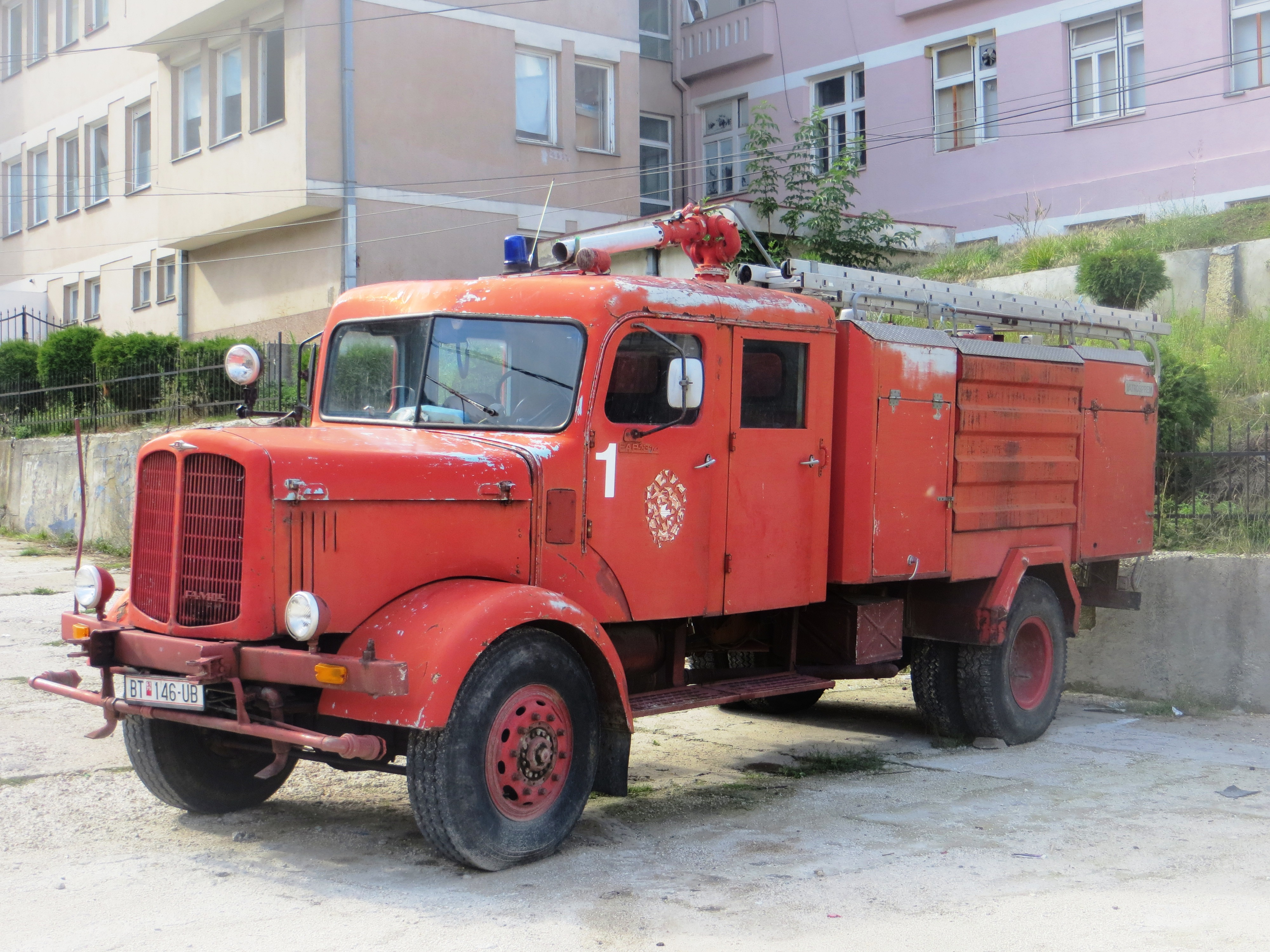
FAP 1314 (pictured in 2014, North Macedonia) is used as inspiration for original album cover

The album was named after the novel of the same name by Katherine Anne Porter. The themes and songs from this album are treated electronically to a good extent, they are less rockier than one might expect, but in the end it is Rambo, as the public has accepted, respected, or simply "appreciated" him less. The viewership of certain songs is absolutely respectable, which clearly speaks of the popularity of Rambo himself.

=== Cover ===
The original album cover features a red FAP truck in the shape of a submarine, while the vinyl cover features an illustration of sailors navigating a flat Earth "lying" on sewer pipes.

== Samples ==
- "Oda radosti – anegdote evrointegracija" – Ode to Joy (Beethoven)
- "Platiš 1 dobiješ 2" – Pobegulja (song from Zona Zamfirova)
