= Bolje jedno vruće pivo nego četiri 'ladna =

Live album by Rambo Amadeus
- Released: 2004
- Recorded: 2002 at MKC in Skopje
- Genre: Blues-rock; parody
- Label: Metropolis Records
- Producer: Rambo Amadeus

Rambo Amadeus chronology
Don't happy, be worry (2000)	Bolje jedno vruće pivo nego četiri 'ladna (2004)	Oprem Dobro (2005)

Professional ratings
Review scores
Source	Rating
Rock Express	9/10 stars

Bolje jedno vruće pivo nego četiri 'ladna (trans. One Warm Beer is Better than Four Cold Ones) is a live album released in 2004 by Montenegrin-Serbian musician Rambo Amadeus. It was recorded in 2002 during his concert in Skopje, Republic of Macedonia.

== Track listing ==
1. "Bolje 1 vruće pivo nego 4 ladna"
2. "Predrasude"
3. "Maroko, zemljo obećana"
4. "Đe si Đenis"
5. "Rambovo normalno kolo"
6. "Čobane vrati se"
7. "Kako se zapravo pravi hit"
8. "Variola Vera"
9. "Ašik mlaka vodo meraklijska"
10. "Otiš'o je svak ko valja"
11. "Prijatelju (ispod sača)"
12. "Prijatelju (sa roštilja)"
13. "Kad bi sve žene na svijetu"
14. "Sega mega"
15. "Evribadi dens nau"
16. "Ja sam robot u srcu i duši"

=== Bonus Tracks ===
1. "Motel Černobil"
2. "Na ovim prostorima (Band Aid za rakiju)"

== Personnel ==
- Goran Ljuboja - Trut — drums
- Mihaljo Krstić - Mixajlo — bass guitar
- Ivan Aleksijević - Pančevac — keyboards
- RASMC — guitar, vocals, sampler
