= Bosiljka Pušić =

Montenegrin writer and poet (1936–2023)

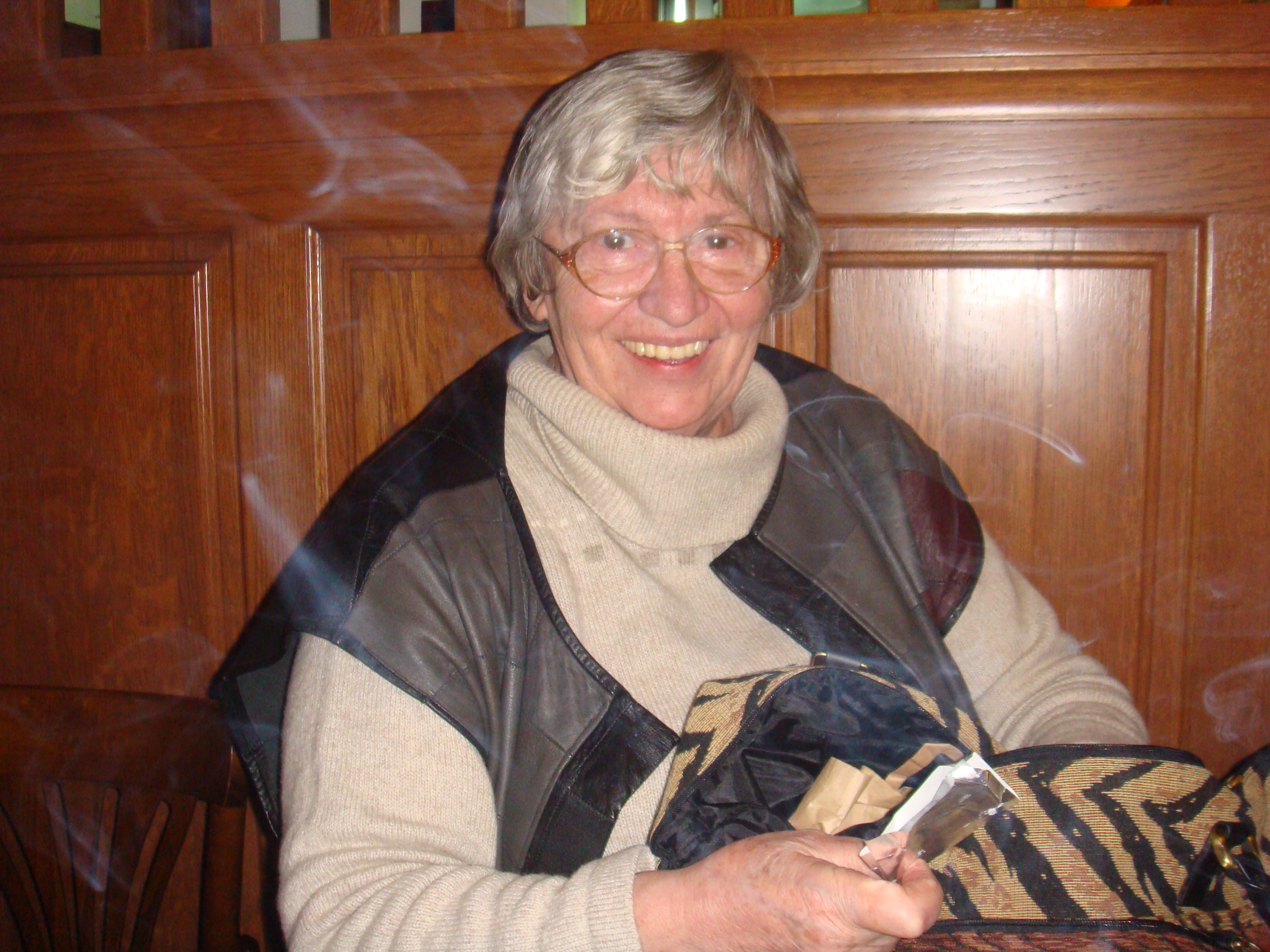
- Born: May 2, 1936; Ćuprija, Kingdom of Yugoslavia
- Died: 23 October 2023 (aged 87)
- Education: University of Belgrade
- Occupation: Writer
- Partner: Ilija Pusic
- Children: 2

Bosiljka Pušić (Serbian Cyrillic: Босиљка Пушић; 2 May 1936 – 23 October 2023) was a Montenegrin writer, teacher and poet. She published more than twenty novels, children's books and poetry collections, and won a number of awards, including the Živojin Pavlović award, and the October award, from the city of Herceg Novi. Before retiring, she worked as a high school teacher in Herceg Novi. She was also a painter. Pušić's son is a prominent musician Antonije Pušić, better known as Rambo Amadeus.

== Life ==
Bosiljka Pušić was born 2 May 1936. She was born in Ćuprija, Serbia. In early 1937 her family moved to Jagodina, where her father opened an independent watch-making shop and she stayed there throughout her elementary and high school education. Bosiljka acquired a degree in literature at the Faculty of Arts in University of Belgrade. Before retiring, she worked as a high school teacher in Herceg Novi. She was also a painter. She was a mother of prominent musician Antonije Pušić, better known as Rambo Amadeus. Her husband was archaeologist and writer Ilija Pušić, who died in 2015.

Pušić was a writer and poet. She published more than twenty novels, children's books and collections of poetry. Her most well-known novel was Opening the Doll, published in 1985. She won a number of awards, including Zmaje's honorary award, the Živojin Pavlović award, and the October award, from the city of Herceg Novi, was awarded to her a few days ago before her death.

Pušić died on 23 October 2023, at the age of 88.

== Awards and nominations ==
- First place for the story Kavez (Prosvetni pregled, Belgrade, 1973).
- Zmajeva počasna nagrada (2003).
- "Živojin Pavlović" 2004 humoristic stories award for her book "Kako preživeti brak".
- Second place for the story "Kralj koji je pojeo sam sebe" (Novi put, 2005).
- Trilogy Naranče pod šlemom was nominated for "Miroslavljevo jevanđelje" in 2009.
- Novel Knjiga o Vojinu was nominated for "Zlatno pero" award in 2009.

== Publications ==
=== Children's books ===
- Hercegnovske čarolije (Osmjeh, Podgorica, 2000).
- Koga boli uvo kako ja rastem (Osmjeh, Podgorica, 2000).
- Ružičasti delfin (Bookland, Belgrade, 2001).
- Žabilijada (Portal, Belgrade, 2003).
- Doživljaji magarčića Magića (Portal, Belgrade, 2004).
- Kobajagična putovanja (Bookland, Belgrade, 2006).
- Plavojko (Bookland, Belgrade, 2000).
- Ko te šiša ("Grigorije Dijak", Podgorica, 2010).
- Kralj koji je pojeo i sebe (Bookland, Belgrade, 2012).

=== Poetry ===
- Krila iste ptice (1970).
- Privid igre (1972).
- Pelin u reveru (1976).
- Rukom prema snu (1980).
- Druga voda (1980).
- Dobošari na trgu (1985).
- Svođenje reči (1989).
- Pepeo i krik (2000).

=== Story collections ===
- Kavez (1981).
- Otapanje (1994).
- Izlet u Žanjice (2000).

=== Novels ===
- Otvaranje lutke (1985).
- Kako preživeti brak (2002, 2003).
- Naranča i nož (2002).
- Narančin cvat (2004).
- Knjiga o Vojinu (2008).
- Naranče pod šlemom - trilogija (2008).
- Stimadur (2011).
- Ispod žižule (2012).
- Tondo (2013).
- ”Balada o Itane” (2016)
- ”Eva”(2017)
- ”Daleki akordi”(2020)
