= Koncert u KUD France Prešeren =

Live album by Rambo Amadeus
- Released: 1998
- Recorded: Ljubljana, Slovenia
- Genre: Jazz; alternative rock
- Label: Vinilmania

Rambo Amadeus chronology
Zbrana dela 2 (1998)	Koncert u KUD France Prešeren (1998)	Don't happy, be worry (2000)

Koncert u KUD France Prešeren is a live album released in 1997 by Montenegrin-Serbian musician Rambo Amadeus. It was recorded in the cultural hall of France Prešeren Culture and Arts Association (Slovene: Kulturno umetniško društvo France Prešeren, shortly KUD France Prešeren) in Ljubljana, Slovenia.

== Track listing ==
1. "Titanik"
2. "Penzija"
3. "Šakom u glavu"
4. "Balkan boy"
5. "LM hit"
6. "Beton"
7. "Zganje Rave"
8. "Po šumama (Of Rising Sun)"
9. "Amerika i Engleska"
10. "Fukara i raja"
11. "Prijatelju"
12. "F.A.P. mašina"
13. "Pomladna voda"
