= Mikroorganizmi =

Микроорганьизмия

Studio album by Rambo Amadeus & Goran Vejvoda
- Released: 1996
- Recorded: July 1995 at studio "Krtola", Paris, except tracks 6 & 7 studio "Ajnštajn", Belgrade
- Genre: Electronic; jazz; rock; avantgarde
- Label: Komuna

Rambo Amadeus chronology
Muzika za decu (1995)	Микроорганьизмия (1996)	Titanik (1997)

Mikroorganizmi (Russian: Микроорганьизмия, English: Microorganisms) is a studio album released in 1996 by Montenegrin-Serbian musician Rambo Amadeus (credited on the cover as Ranko Amadeus) and Goran Vejvoda. It features inaccessible, moody sound garnered with terse, experimental lyrics marking a sizable departure from Rambo Amadeus' usual antics. Stylistically, Mikroorganizmi is a unique album in Rambo Amadeus' discography and thus can be marked as much more ambient-oriented LP.

== Track listing ==
All songs by Rambo Amadeus and Goran Vejvoda

1. "Mikroorganizmi" (5:17) (voice: Sergej Afrika)
2. "Alo Požega" (3:38)
3. "Smrt No. 2" (4:29)
4. "Evribadi dens (nau)" (4:27)
5. "Mango Chutney Jungle" (4:53)
6. "Ray Ban protiv Linguafona" (4:24) (guest performers: Bata Meger and Ninoslav Ademović)
7. "Linguafon protiv Johna Kwesija" (4:33)
8. "Oklopno Rave Kolo Gucha 2001 GTLX" (4:38)
9. (Hidden track) (5:32) (vocals: Rambo Amadeus)

== Personnel ==
- Rambo Amadeus
- Goran Vejvoda
- Dragan Vukićević-Gogolj - engineer, mastering
- Slavimir Stojanović - artwork design
- The following samples were used: vinyl "Sremski front" and soundtrack from film Užička republika in track 2, Toma Milanković's archive in track 3, 7 & 8, Antonije Pušić's archive in track 4, some domestic & foreign vinyls in track 5 & 6.
