= Muzika za decu =

Studio album by Rambo Amadeus
- Released: 1995
- Recorded: studio "5", Radio Belgrade
- Genre: Children's music
- Label: B92

Rambo Amadeus chronology
Izabrana dela (1994)	Muzika za decu (1995)	Mikroorganizmi (1996)

Muzika za decu (trans. Music for Children) is a studio album released in 1995 by Montenegrin-Serbian musician Rambo Amadeus.

== Track listing ==
Lyrics by Ljubivoje Ršumović

1. "Popaj i Badža"
2. "Kojot Kosta"
3. "Pera Detlić"
4. "Kapetan Kuka"
5. "Gargamel"
6. "Patak Dača"
7. "Hromi Daba"
8. "Tom i Džeri"
9. "Duško Dugouško"
10. "Braća Dalton"
11. "Sex"
12. "Abvgd"

== Personnel ==
- Bass guitar — Bata Božanić
- Saxophone — Neša Petrović
- Drums — Trut
- Guitar, Vocals — Rasmc
