= O tugo jesenja =

Studio album by Rambo Amadeus
- Released: 1988
- Recorded: Studio "O", Belgrade
- Genre: Electronic; funk; soul; rock; hip hop
- Label: PGP RTB
- Producer: Saša Habić

Rambo Amadeus chronology
O tugo jesenja (1988)	Hoćemo gusle (1989)

O tugo jesenja (trans. Oh Autumn Sorrow) is the first studio album released in 1988 by Montenegrin-Serbian musician Rambo Amadeus.

== Track listing ==
All songs by Rambo Amadeus, except where noted.

Side A
No.	Title	Length
1.	"Vanzemaljac" (written by Saša Habić)	3:30
2.	"Fala ti majko"	3:32
3.	"Video"	3:41
4.	"Gaudeamus"	1:48
5.	"Životinjo mikroskopska"	3:34

Side B
No.	Title	Length
1.	"Rambo Amadeus"	3:16
2.	"Rambo Amadeus (verzija II)" (written by Vukoman S. Karadžić)	0:21
3.	"Pilot babo"	3:24
4.	"Manijak" (arranged by V. Perić)	3:10
5.	"Amadeus kolo" (lyrics by Crni Panter, music by L. V. Beethoven)	3:43

Bonus tracks (1999 reissue)
No.	Title	Length
1.	"Đede Niko" (vocals and written by Knez)	4:10
2.	"Beton"	3:56

== Personnel ==
- Accordion (dallape) — Saša Marković-Meksikanac
- Bass, vocals, synthesizer (Sp12, Emax, Bass Synth), sampler — Vladimir Perić
- keyboards — Aleksandar Habić
- Synthesizer (Mirage), tambourine, handclaps — Miroslav Miša Savić
- Vocals — Aleksandar Vasiljević
- Vocals, guitar, goblet drum (tarabuka), drum programming (rhythm machine), keyboards, harp — Rambo Amadeus
