= Rambo Amadeus =

Montenegrin singer (born 1963)

Rambo Amadeus Рамбо Амадеус
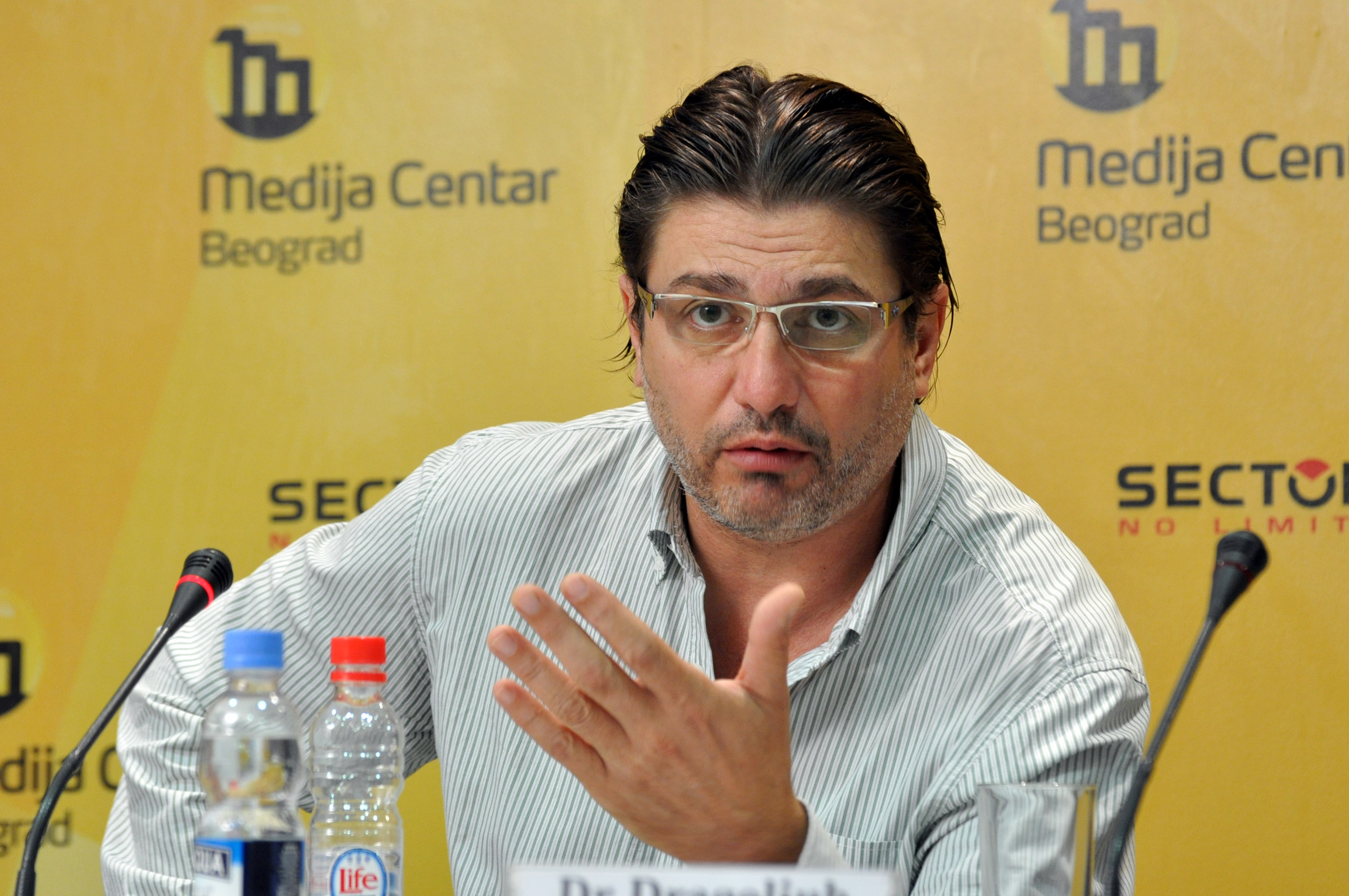
- Rambo Amadeus in 2011

Background information
- Also known as: Svjetski Kilo Car
- Born: Antonije Pušić; 14 June 1963 (age 63); Kotor, SR Montenegro, Yugoslavia
- Origin: Herceg Novi, Montenegro
- Genres: Jazz fusion; experimental rock; comedy rock; funk rock; jazz rock; film music
- Occupations: Singer; musician; composer
- Instruments: Vocals; guitar
- Years active: 1988–present
- Website: ramboamadeus.com

Antonije Pušić (Serbian Cyrillic: Антоније Пушић; born 14 June 1963), known professionally as Rambo Amadeus (Serbian Cyrillic: Рамбо Амадеус), is a Montenegrin−Serb author and performer. A self-titled "musician, poet, and media manipulator", he is a noted artist across the countries of former Yugoslavia.

His songs combine satirical lyrics on human nature and the silliness of local politics with a mixture of musical styles including jazz, rock, hip-hop and drum and bass, and self-conscious ironic wit; for example, his most popular alias is "Rambo Amadeus Svjetski Kilo Car" ("Rambo Amadeus the World Kilo Tzar"), formerly "Rambo Amadeus Svjetski Mega Car" ("Rambo Amadeus the World Mega Tzar") (RASMC) (changed in 2012 because of his belief in the importance of modesty in an environmentally conscious society). His stage name itself is made from John Rambo and Wolfgang Amadeus Mozart.

His concerts are never mere repetitions of recorded songs, but a mixture of free improvisation and satirical humor exploiting all aspects of human nature in a crude manner. Some fans compare his style with Frank Zappa and Captain Beefheart.

Rambo Amadeus represented Montenegro in the Eurovision Song Contest 2012 in Baku, Azerbaijan, with the song "Euro Neuro", but failed to progress beyond the first semi-final.

== Early life ==
Antonije Pušić was born in Kotor, SR Montenegro, SFR Yugoslavia though his family lived in nearby Herceg Novi where he was raised. His parents, mother Bosiljka, a literature professor and writer, and father Ilija, an archaeologist and scientific worker, raised him and his brother Andrija in Herceg Novi. After completing elementary and secondary education in his hometown, Antonije graduated in tourism studies from the University of Belgrade's Faculty of Mathematics and Natural Sciences. He also completed six grades of elementary music school for piano before dropping out.

Before pursuing music and performing arts as a career choice, Pušić was an accomplished competitive sailor. Between 1972 and 1984, he represented Yugoslavia in numerous international regattas. During this period he was the Montenegrin champion several times, an 8-time South-Adriatic champion, national title winner in the junior category, as well as International Đerdap Cup winner in 1980. He still occasionally attends and participates in some recreational sailing regattas in the Gulf of Kotor.

He began to sing and compose during his first year of high school (gymnasium) which soon led to involvement with various local bands in Herceg Novi and Titograd. One of his first performances saw him play the mandolin in an orchestra entertaining guests at Herceg Novi's Plaza hotel.

In 1985, he moved to Belgrade in pursuit of higher education. Parallel to his university studies, he also played with various amateur bands and musicians.

== Musical career ==
=== 1970s ===
In 1979, Rambo Amadeus started off in a band called "Radioaktivni otpad," which was short lived. He was also in a band called "The Blues Band." He did not like the content produced, so he rearranged the setup. The band lasted throughout his high school years, playing in Herceg Novi, Nikšić and Igalo (5 km distance from Herceg Novi).

=== 1980s ===
In 1988, he dropped into the music scene out of nowhere with his debut album O tugo jesenja. His sound was a seemingly coarse blend of folkish ululations and opera, further mixed in with humorous lyrics and classic guitar riffs. Since very few people had prior knowledge of him, Rambo was delighted in creating confusion by introducing himself as Nagib Fazlić Nagon, a mine shaft operator who saved up enough money to record an album. He also jokingly referred to his own musical style as turbo folk, long before this term would begin to be applied to an actual musical style, which critics refer to with a grave social connotation and came to symbolise the moral and cultural decline throughout the Balkans during the wars of the 1990s.

Producer Saša Habić gave Rambo the opportunity to sign for the state television's record company PGP RTB (Rambo later wrote an anecdotal tribute to that event, in the hit song "Balkan Boy"). Habić also played the synthesiser on this album, from which a track named "Vanzemaljac" (Extraterrestrial) continues to be popular to this day. The record's sales were not particularly high, but Rambo created enough of a buzz to remain active on the scene.

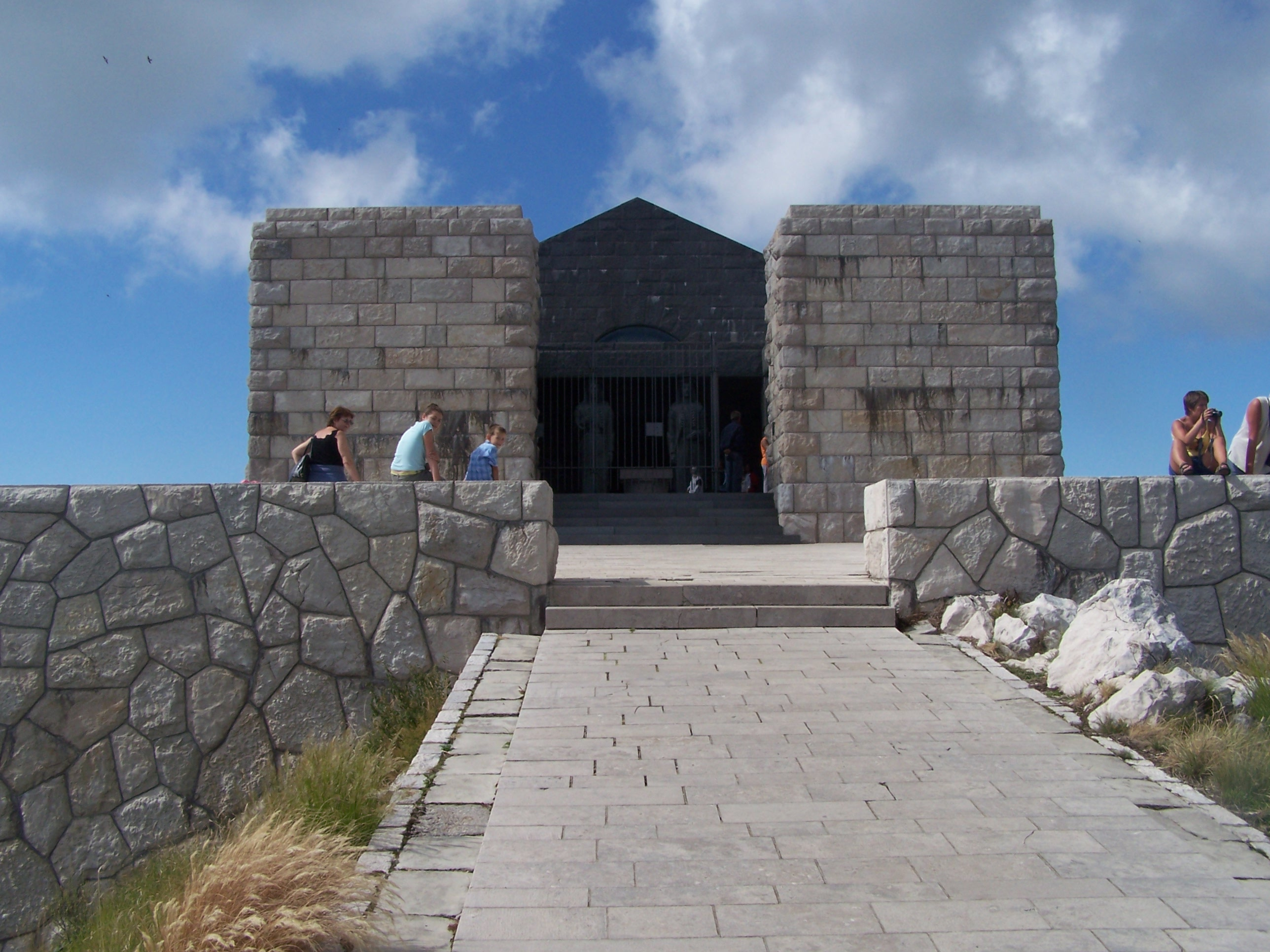
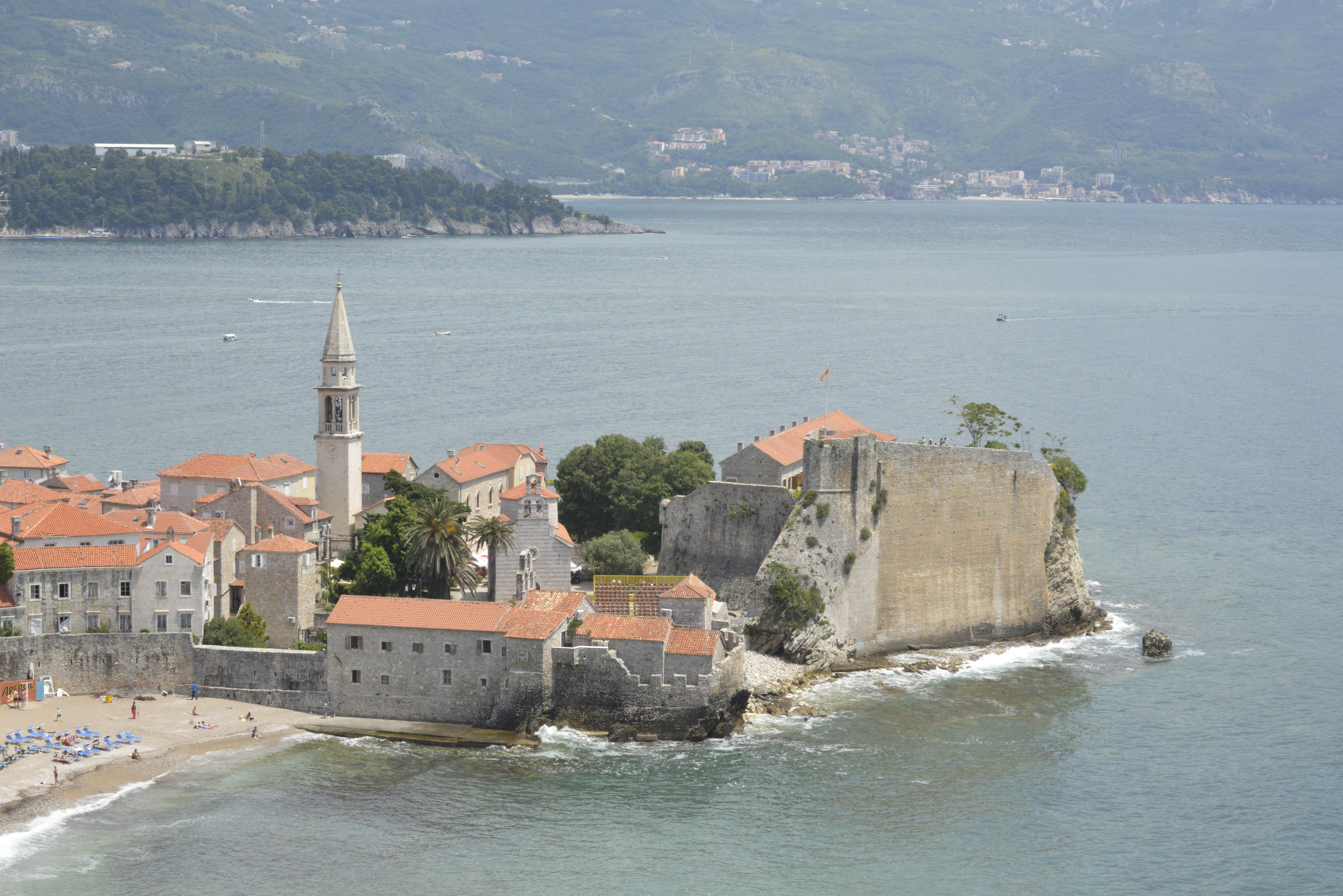
Music video for Samit u buregdžinici Laibach was filmed at Mausoleum of Njegoš in Lovcen, while music video for Sokolov greben was film at Ričardova glava in Budva.

His next album Hoćemo gusle was released in 1989 and gave a small taste of Rambo's future musical direction – overt political satire. The track "Amerika i Engleska (biće zemlja proleterska)" was originally supposed to be named "Kataklizma komunizma" (Cataclysm of Communism) but local authorities did not allow it. The album title pokes fun at a bizarre event from the 1989 protests in Montenegro that eventually grew into the anti-bureaucratic revolution that swept Milo Đukanović, Momir Bulatović, and Svetozar Marović into power. Protesters were heard chanting "Hoćemo Ruse" ("We want the Russians"), but when the authorities and state-controlled media criticized them for it, many quickly began backpedaling by claiming they actually chanted "Hoćemo gusle" ("We want gusle").

Other songs like "Glupi hit" and the aforementioned "Balkan boy" would also become considerable hits. Rambo even received solid critical acclaim for chances he took in "Samit u buregdžinici Laibach". On that track, he created a catchy hybrid by mixing the unique sound of Laibach with lyrics borrowed from the poetry of Laza Kostić and Desanka Maksimović, as well as from folk kafana standard "Čaše lomim" mixing with his own humorous lyrics. The album sleeve lists the lyrics of a song that was not actually recorded, and explains that "it was dropped at the last moment because there was no room for it," but gives assurances that it would appear on the next album. Since the song in question, named "Pegepe ertebe," was all about taking shots at Rambo's label PGP RTB, but however, it did not appear on the next or any other album.

=== 1990s ===
In the early 1990s, Rambo was growing into an established performer. His third album Psihološko propagandni komplet M-91 came out towards the end of 1991 at a time when the breakup of the former Yugoslavia was already in full swing. For obvious reasons, the least of which was the album's subtitle – Psychological Propaganda Set, many songs contained heavy lyrics and a dark, militaristic atmosphere. In your face profanity and descriptive cursing was also par for the course, making this the first major music release in former Yugoslavia to take such narrative liberties. Tracks like "Smrt popa Mila Jovovića" (30-year-old poem by Božo Đuranović), "Jemo voli jem" (incorporating samples from Yugoslav aviators' anthem "Hej vojnici vazduhoplovci" as well as Šemsa Suljaković's "Izgubila sve sam bitke"), "Inspektor Nagib" and "Zdravo damo" became instant hits.

The discrepancy between what's listed on the cover and what is actually recorded is there again as sleeve announces the track called "KPGS" which would, this time for real, appear on the next live album, but does not list "Halid invalid Hari" and "Prijatelju, prijatelju" which were included and became big hits. Many consider the two tracks to be classic Rambo: observant, opinionated, direct and profane. The latter of the two originally included excerpts from Slobodan Milošević and Franjo Tuđman speeches, but the record company censors took them out.

This album further solidified Rambo's presence on the scene as he started playing bigger arenas like Sava centar. Due to his outspoken and entertaining nature he would often get invited on various TV and radio outlets across the country.

During "Belgrade spring" festival in 1992, he showed civil courage when he interrupted a concert by "Bebi Dol" during live TV broadcast and said to tens of thousands of viewers:

"As we play here bombs are falling on Dubrovnik and Tuzla. We won't entertain the political voters no more. F*** your mothers!"

He threw the microphone on the floor, left the stage and the show was over.

Trying to take the new situation in stride, he hit the road, becoming one of the first performers from FR Yugoslavia to regularly start touring Macedonia and Slovenia in the years following those states' declarations of independence.

After the live album KPGS (taped on 29 December 1992 in Skopje) that included the new studio track "Karamba karambita" followed by a greatest hits compilation Izabrana dela 1989–1994, Rambo recorded peculiar new material during July 1995 in Paris with Goran Vejvoda. Released the following year as Mikroorganizmi, it featured an inaccessible, moody sound garnered with terse, experimental music marking a sizable departure from his usual antics.

He simultaneously released Muzika za decu, a personal musical take on Ljubivoje Ršumović's poetry featuring two bonus new tracks – "Sex" and "ABVGD".

Old-school Rambo fans did not have to wait long for a return to earlier style. Towards the end of 1996, on Titanik he delivered a new batch of traditional fare like "Šakom u glavu", "Sado-mazo", "Zreo za penziju" and "Otiš'o je svak ko valja" (dedicated to Toma Zdravković and members of Šarlo Akrobata). Seasoned musicians like Ognjen Radivojević (who would become famous for working with such musicians like Goran Bregović and Zdravko Čolić), Goran Ljuboja, Dragan Markovski and Marija Mihajlović) took part in recording sessions for this album.

An extensive tour followed and it again included Slovenia (a live album was recorded over two Ljubljana concerts in April 1997 and later released as Koncert u KUD France Prešeren), as well as Bosnia where Rambo appeared as a guest at Sejo Sexon's Zabranjeno pušenje gig in Sarajevo. That appearance in December 1997 was the first post-war visit by a Montenegrin performer to Bosnia.

On 9 June 1998 Rambo played Belgrade's Dom Sindikata hall in what he announced to be the farewell performance before retirement. Even if many doubted his sincerity, the concert was a memorable one. Soon, Rambo packed his bags and left for the Netherlands, though not before squeezing in two more shows in Bosnia. In the Netherlands, he worked a series of menial jobs including construction, before deciding to return to Belgrade after only four months abroad. Back home, not surprisingly, he also returned to music and continued to break down inter-ethnic barriers: on 10 December 1998 he and Margita Stefanović played a show in Pula at the local cinema with KUD Idijoti, which was a first opportunity since the war for a Croatian audience to see performers from Serbia and Montenegro.

=== 2000s ===
Throughout 2000, Rambo worked on what would eventually become the Don't Happy, Be Worry album. This album included the song Laganese which sampled the Norwegian journalist Åsne Seierstad singing the Norwegian Folk song Eg rodde meg ut på seiegrunnen and swearing. By this time, sampling and local pop-cultural references had become two more staples of his sound, and this material, too, was heavy on both. Produced by Iztok Turk, it featured tracks like "Čoban je upravo napustio zgradu" (loose cover of Neda Ukraden's "Zora je svanula"), "Moj skutere" that borrows from Oliver Dragojević's "Moj galebe", and "Izađite molim" with sprinkled in dialogues from Goran Marković's 1982 movie Variola vera.

In 2004, Rambo released his third live album Bolje jedno vruće pivo nego četri ladna, which was followed by the studio album Oprem dobro in mid-2005.

He made a song "Dikh tu kava" in collaboration with ethno-jazz fusion band Kal, and in 2007 he appeared on their album as a featured artist in the song "Komedija" ("Comedy").

In autumn 2007 he did a performance called "Mixing of alternative rocks", when he "played" on 12 concrete mixers in front of the audience during The Alternative Rock Festival in SKC, Belgrade.

For the purpose of the New Year's show on RTV, he appeared in the song "Rakija" followed by Zorule, the traditional folk orchestra. This song was used later as one of the tracks for "Vratiće se rode" TV serial. In February 2008, Rambo Amadeus performed as a guest star of The RTS Big Band jazz orchestra, for their 60th Anniversary.

Hipishizik Metafizik is his latest studio album, released for PGP RTS in July 2008.

=== 2010s ===
Rambo Amadeus was internally selected by the Montenegrin national broadcaster RTCG to represent Montenegro in the Eurovision Song Contest 2012 in Baku, Azerbaijan. His winning song "Euro Neuro" gained controversy for its video. He ultimately succeeded in his goal of obtaining a very low ranking in the competition and announced that he is honoured to have written the worst song on Eurovision.

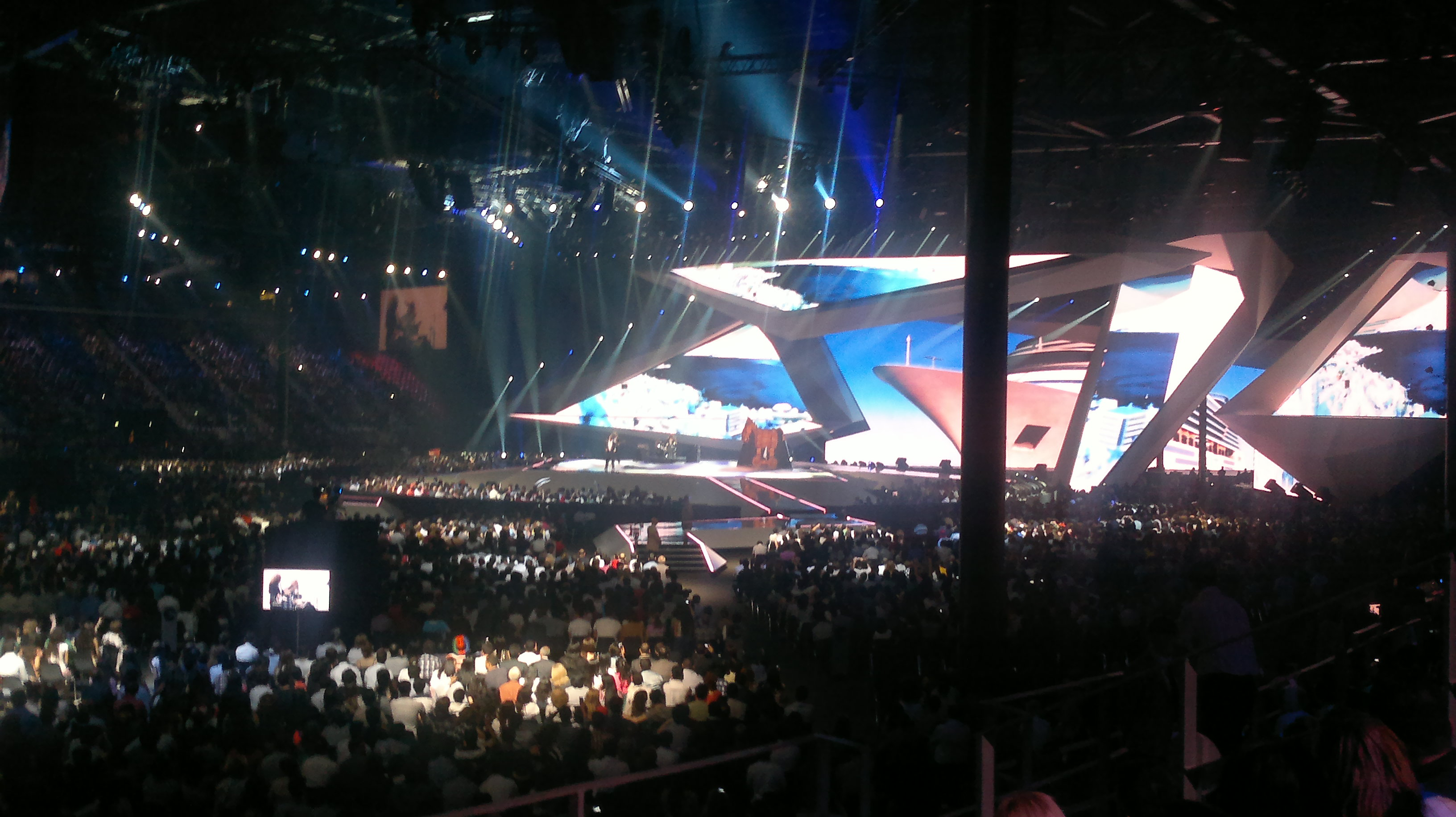
Rambo's performance at Eurovision was met with some controversies because of the satirical nature of the song "Euro Neuro" towards Europe

In 2013, he released a video for the new single O'Ruk on the Road Again with Three Winnettous.

In 2015, he released the album Vrh dna, which featured previously unreleased track "Rano Za Početak" from 2011, and he retitled it "Samo Balade" for the album's release.

In 2016, he landed two voice-work roles, as Mighty Eagle in the Croatian-language and Serbian-language version of The Angry Birds Movie, and as Crush in the Serbian-language version of Finding Dory.

In 2018, he tried to represent Serbia in the Eurovision Song Contest 2018 with the song Nema Te, a duet with jazz singer Beti Đorđević. They performed the song in Beovizija 2018. and came 9th.

== Other endeavours ==
In addition to a prolific solo recording career, Rambo frequently engaged in different, often bizarre side projects.

- In 1989 in Sarajevo, for a short while, he hosted an erotic quiz show with actress Jasna Beri named Turbo-lilihip, which aired on a local TV station SA3.
- He wrote music for different theatre plays such as Đetić u parlament, Oksimoron, as well as Lažni car Šćepan Mali for which he was awarded the Sterija prize in 1994.
- Rambo also wrote lyrics for commercial folk stars like Lepa Brena and Vesna Zmijanac, as well as the entire score for the 1994 film Slatko od snova, which was a star vehicle for another folk performer Dragana Mirković.
- In 1994, he also wrote a musical score for the 1927 silent movie Metropolis by Fritz Lang. At a movie screening at Sava Center, Rambo's music was played by the Belgrade Philharmonic. The material was later recorded by Rambo himself along with Miroslav Savić and Heavily Manipulated Orchestra, and released as Metropolis B (Tour-de-Force)
- A year later, he arranged a cadenza within "A concerto for piano and orchestra in C-minor" by W.A. Mozart. In 1995, this cadenza was performed by Ivan Tasovac, while the entire concert was conducted by Oskar Danon at Belgrade's Kolarac concert hall.
- Since early 2005, Rambo has written a column Megacarska razmišljanja (Mega-Imperial Thoughts) for the daily tabloid Blic.
- In December 2010, he was a guest on Studio B's Agape program together with Serbian Orthodox bishop Porfirije where they talked about the meaning of life, finding ones's self way in life, slowing down, drug abuse and rehabilitation (Rambo confessed to using marijuana for 20 years).
- Rambo has done voice-work for the Serbian-Croatian language dubs of The Lion King franchise, Despicable Me, Ice Age: Continental Drift, Madagascar 3: Europe's Most Wanted, The Angry Birds Movie and Finding Dory.

== Backing band members ==
Current members

- Rambo Amadeus (World Kilo Tzar) – guitar, fretless guitar, vocals, arrangement

Live members

- Miroslav Tovirac – bass (2012–)
- Igor Malešević – drums, percussion (2012)

Also associated

- Aleksandra Kovač – vocals
- Kristina Kovač – vocals
- Nenad Knežević-Knez – vocals
- Goran Ljuboja "Trut" – drums
- Mihajlo Krstić – bass
- Vladimir Čukić – bass
- Vojno Dizdar – keyboards
- Digital Mandrak
- Goran Vejvoda
- Gojko Sisa
- Ilija Milutinović "Popara"
- Vitez Šablon Dimija

== Discography ==
=== Studio albums ===
- O tugo jesenja (1988)
- Hoćemo gusle (1989)
- Psihološko propagandni komplet M-91 (1991)
- Muzika za decu (1995)
- Mikroorganizmi (1996)
- Titanik (1997)
- Metropolis B (tour-de-force) (1998)
- Don't Happy, Be Worry (2000) – released as Čobane vrati se in Slovenia and Croatia
- Oprem Dobro (2005)
- Hipishizik Metafizik (2008)
- Vrh Dna (2015)
- Brod budala (2020)

=== EPs ===
- Yes No (2008)

=== Live albums ===
- Kurac, Pička, Govno, Sisa (1993)
- Koncert u KUD France Prešeren (1997)
- Bolje jedno vruće pivo nego četri ladna (2004)
- Rambo Amadeus & Mutant Dance Sextet u Domu Sindikata (2011)

=== Compilations ===
- Izabrana dela (1994)
- Zbrana dela 1 (1998)
- Zbrana dela 2 (1998)

Awards and achievements
Preceded by Andrea Demirović with "Just Get Out of My Life"	Montenegro in the Eurovision Song Contest; 2012	Succeeded by Who See with "Igranka"
