= Psihološko propagandni komplet M-91 =

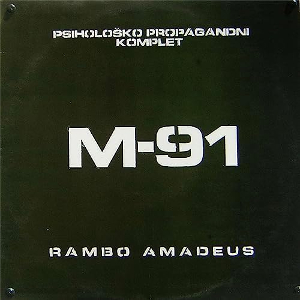

Studio album by Rambo Amadeus
- Released: 1991
- Label: PGP-RTB

Psihološko propagandni komplet M-91 (Psychological propaganda kit M-91) is the third album of Montenegrin singer Rambo Amadeus released in 1991 by PGP-RTB. Hits from this album are Jemo voli jem, Inspektor Nagib, Halid Invalid Hari (play on words of Goran Bare's pseudonym Halid Gali Halid and the band Hari Mata Hari), modern cover of traditional song Smrt popa Mila Jovovića, Prijatelju, prijatelju... It was named after Zastava M91 rifle.

== Reception ==
In his column for Borba, Zafir Hadžimanov wrote that the album contains international and Yugoslav musical nonsense and to salute the army behind the album.

== Charts ==
Charts for Psihološko propagandni komplet M-91 (1992)
| Chart | Peak position |
|---|---|
| Radio TV revija | 5 |

== Samples ==
- Abvgd - Kalinka and Swan Lake
- Jemo voli jem - Pump Up the Jam by Technotronic, U Can't Touch This by MC Hammer, Izdali me prijatelji by Šemsa Suljaković feat. Južni vetar and Yugoslav Partisan song Hej vojnici, vazduhoplovci
- Halid Invalid Hari - Volio bih da te ne volim by Hari Mata Hari
