= Latvia in the Eurovision Song Contest 2013 =

- Eurovision Song Contest 2013
- Participating broadcaster: Latvijas Televīzija (LTV)
- Country: Latvia
- Selection process: Dziesma 2013
- Selection date: 16 February 2013

Competing entry
- Song: "Here We Go"
- Artist: PeR
- Songwriters: Ralfs Eilands; Arturas Burke

Placement
- Semi-final result: Failed to qualify (17th)

Participation chronology

Latvia was represented at the Eurovision Song Contest 2013 with the song "Here We Go", written by Ralfs Eilands and Arturas Burke, and performed by the group PeR. The Latvian participating broadcaster, Latvijas Televīzija (LTV), organised the national final Dziesma 2013 in order to select its entry for the contest. Twenty-four songs were selected to compete in the national final, which consisted of three shows: two semi-finals and a final. In the semi-finals on 8 and 9 February 2013, six entries were selected to advance from each show. Twelve songs ultimately qualified to compete in the final on 16 February 2013 where two rounds of voting by a public televote and a nine-member jury panel selected "Here We Go" performed by PeR as the winner.

Latvia was drawn to compete in the second semi-final of the Eurovision Song Contest which took place on 16 May 2013. Performing as the opening entry for the show in position 1, "Here We Go" was not announced among the top 10 entries of the second semi-final and therefore did not qualify to compete in the final. It was later revealed that Latvia placed seventeenth (last) out of the 17 participating countries in the semi-final with 13 points.

== Background ==
Prior to the 2013 contest, Latvijas Televīzija (LTV) had participated in the Eurovision Song Contest representing Latvia thirteen times since its first entry in 2000. Latvia won the contest once in 2002 with the song "I Wanna" performed by Marie N. Following the introduction of semi-finals for the 2004, Latvia was able to qualify to compete in the final between 2005 and 2008. Between 2009 and 2012, the nation had failed to qualify to the final for four consecutive years including with their 2012 entry "Beautiful Song" performed by Anmary.

As part of its duties as participating broadcaster, LTV organises the selection of its entry in the Eurovision Song Contest and broadcasts the event in the country. The broadcaster confirmed its intentions to participate at the 2013 contest on 16 October 2012. LTV has selected its entries for the Eurovision Song Contest through a national final. Since their debut in 2000 until 2012, LTV had organised the selection show Eirodziesma. In a response to its failure to qualify to the final at Eurovision since 2008, the broadcaster announced that the national final would be rebranded and retooled as Dziesma in order to select its entry for the 2013 contest, organised in cooperation with the Ventspils City Council and Ventspils Development Agency.

== Before Eurovision ==
=== Dziesma 2013 ===
Dziesma 2013 was the first edition of Dziesma, the music competition that selects Latvia's entries for the Eurovision Song Contest. The competition commenced with the first of two-semi finals on 8 February 2013 and concluded with a final on 16 February 2013. All shows in the competition were hosted by Mārtiņš Meiers, Madara Botmane and Anta Aizupe and broadcast on LTV1 as well as online via the broadcaster's official website ltv.lv. The final was also streamed online at the official Eurovision Song Contest website eurovision.tv.

==== Format ====
The format of the competition consisted of three shows: two semi-finals and a final. The two semi-finals, held on 8 and 9 February 2013, each featured twelve competing entries from which six advanced to the final from each show. The final, held on 16 February 2013, selected the Latvian entry for Malmö from the remaining twelve entries over two rounds of voting: the first round selected the top three songs and the second round (superfinal) selected the winner. Results during the semi-final and final shows were determined by the 50/50 combination of votes from a jury panel and a public vote. Both the jury and public vote assigned points from 1 to 12 based on ranking in the semi-finals and the first round of the final, with the first place receiving one point and last place receiving twelve points. In the superfinal, the jury and public both assigned points from 1 to 3 also based on ranking with the first place receiving one point and last place receiving three points. Ties were decided in favour of the entries that received higher points from the public. Viewers were able to vote via telephone up to five times or via SMS with a single SMS counting as five votes.

==== Competing entries ====
Songwriters were able to submit their entries to the broadcaster between 19 October 2012 and 30 November 2012. 122 entries were submitted at the conclusion of the submission period. A jury panel appointed by LTV evaluated the submitted songs and the twenty-four selected songwriters had until 14 January 2013 to nominate the performers for their songs. The jury panel consisted of Aija Strazdiņa (director and producer), Ģirts Lūsis (musician, composer and manager of the groups Labvēlīgais tips and 2007 Latvian Eurovision entrant Bonaparti.lv), Kārlis Auzāns (producer and composer), Vineta Elksne (singer, vocal coach, conductor and songwriter), Aija Vītoliņa (singer), Valters Frīdenbergs (2005 Latvian Eurovision entrant as part of Walters and Kazha), Ott Lepland (2012 Estonian Eurovision entrant) and Adam Klein (British music manager). The twenty-four competing songs were announced during a press conference on 11 December 2012, while the competing artists were announced on 15 January 2013.

Artist	Song	Songwriter(s)
Aiwink	"Now or Never"	Aleksandrs Rjabčuns
Andris Kivičs	"Hey! Hey!"	Andris Kivičs
Antra Stafecka	"When You Are With Me"	Raph Schillebeeckx, Karen Verresen, Bruce R.F. Smith
Dāvids Kalandija and Dināra	"Fool in Love"	Jonas Gladnikoff, Camilla Gottschalck, Christina Schilling, Liza Petersen
Dominic Okolue	"Good Woman"	Dominic Okolue
Fox Lima	"Tirpini"	Alise Ketnere
Framest	"Let the Night Belong to the Lovers"	Erik Anjou
Headline	"Love"	Mārcis Rēdmanis, Lauris Busulis
Ieva Sutugova	"Cold Heart"	Jānis Miltiņš, Ieva Sutugova
Ivo Grīsniņš Grīslis	"Give Me a Try"	Ingars Viļums
Kristīne Šomase	"Phoenix Fly"	Mathias Kallenberger, Andréas Berlin, Filip Lindfors, Anton Malmberg Hård af Segerstad
Liene Candy	"Higher and Higher"	Christof Straub
Liene Matveja and Baiba Reine	"Love Responder"	Edgars Viļums
Marta Ritova	"I Am Who I Am"	Marta Ritova
Mārtiņš Ruskis and 4 vēji	"Joey"	Eric Anjou, Peter Svensson
Niko	"One"	Johnny Sanchez, Michael James Down, Hanif Sabzevari Hitmanic
Olafs Bergmanis and the Random People	"Never Let Me Go"	Jānis Polis
PeR	"Here We Go"	Ralfs Eilands, Arturas Burke
PeR	"Sad Trumpet"	Ralfs Eilands, Arturas Burke
Pieneņu vīns	"Better Than You"	Jurijs Koškins, Evilena Protektore
Pieneņu vīns	"The One"	Jurijs Koškins, Evilena Protektore
Rūta Dūduma	"Here I Am"	Patrik Öhlund, Madelene Hamberg
Sabīne Berezina	"Upside Down"	Filip Lindfors, Bertel Österberg, Kristoffer Eriksson
Samanta Tīna	"I Need a Hero"	Johnny Sanchez, Michael James Down, Marcus Fernell, Beatrice Eriksson

==== Semi-finals ====
The two semi-finals took place at the Palladium Concert Hall in Riga on 8 and 9 February 2013. In each semi-final twelve acts competed and six entries qualified to the final based on the combination of votes from a jury panel and the Latvian public. The jury panel that voted in the semi-finals consisted of Aija Strazdiņa (director and producer), Aija Vītoliņa (singer), Lara Bellerose (Belgian actress and singer-songwriter), Ģirts Lūsis (musician, composer and manager of the groups Labvēlīgais tips and 2007 Latvian Eurovision entrant Bonaparti.lv), Valters Pūce (musician), Jegors Jerohomovičs (music critic and cultural journalist), Ieva Rozentāle (head of the LTV Culture Broadcasts Editorial Office; first semi-final), Kārlis Auzāns (producer and composer; first semi-final), Jānis Palkavnieks (spokesman for Draugiem.lv; first semi-final), Vineta Elksne (singer, vocal coach, conductor and songwriter; second semi-final), Valters Frīdenbergs (2005 Latvian Eurovision entrant as part of Walters and Kazha; second semi-final), Anmary (2012 Latvian Eurovision entrant; second semi-final).

Semi-final 1 – 8 February 2013
R/O	Artist	Song	Jury		Televote		Place
R/O	Artist	Song	Votes	Rank	Votes	Rank	Place
1	Liene Candy	"Higher and Higher"	30	1	630	5	3
2	Fox Lima	"Tirpini"	63	8	302	12	11
3	Dominic Okolue	"Good Woman"	83	11	339	10	12
4	Antra Stafecka	"When You Are With Me"	54	5	582	7	5
5	Olafs Bergmanis and the Random People	"Never Let Me Go"	70	10	420	9	9
6	Headline	"Love"	45	4	532	8	6
7	Pieneņu vīns	"Better Than You"	61	7	593	6	7
8	Ivo Grīsniņš Grīslis	"Give Me a Try"	64	9	304	11	10
9	Samanta Tīna	"I Need a Hero"	41	3	1,099	1	1
10	Liene Matveja and Baiba Reine	"Love Responder"	93	12	635	4	8
11	Sabīne Berezina	"Upside Down"	60	6	669	2	4
12	PeR	"Sad Trumpet"	38	2	652	3	2

Semi-final 2 – 9 February 2013
R/O	Artist	Song	Jury		Televote		Place
R/O	Artist	Song	Votes	Rank	Votes	Rank	Place
1	Aiwink	"Now or Never"	82	10	708	7	9
2	Ieva Sutugova	"Cold Heart"	55	6	520	8	6
3	Marta Ritova	"I Am Who I Am"	32	2	980	2	2
4	PeR	"Here We Go"	13	1	979	3	3
5	Dāvids Kalandija and Dināra	"Fool in Love"	67	8	813	6	5
6	Mārtiņš Ruskis and 4 vēji	"Joey"	87	11	838	4	8
7	Andris Kivičs	"Hey! Hey!"	93	12	246	11	12
8	Pieneņu Vīns	"The One"	60	7	819	5	4
9	Niko	"One"	43	3	1,429	1	1
10	Framest	"Let the Night Belong to the Lovers"	53	5	211	12	10
11	Kristīne Šomase	"Phoenix Fly"	71	9	449	9	11
12	Rūta Dūduma	"Here I Am"	46	4	435	10	7

==== Final ====
The final took place at the Jūras vārti Theatre in Ventspils on 16 February 2013. The twelve entries that qualified from the preceding two semi-finals competed and the winner was selected over two rounds of voting. In the first round, three songs advanced to the second round, the superfinal, based on the combination of votes from a jury panel and the Latvian public. In the superfinal, "Here We Go" performed by PeR was declared the winner through the combination of votes from the jury and public. The jury panel that voted in the final consisted of Aija Strazdina (director and producer), Vineta Elksne (singer, vocal coach, conductor and songwriter), Ieva Rozentāle (Head of the LTV Culture Broadcasts Editorial Office), Ģirts Lūsis (musician, composer and manager of the groups Labvēlīgais tips and 2007 Latvian Eurovision entrant Bonaparti.lv), Sandris Vanzovičs (music journalist), Kārlis Auzāns (producer and composer), Jānis Stībelis (musician), Valters Pūce (musician) and Ott Lepland (2012 Estonian Eurovision entrant).

In addition to the performances of the competing entries, guest performers included Jānis Stībelis, Labvēlīgais tips, Ott Lepland, Vineta Elksne, cello trio DaGamba, singer Dons and 2012 Latvian Eurovision entrant Anmary.

Final – 16 February 2013
R/O	Artist	Song	Jury		Televote		Place
R/O	Artist	Song	Votes	Rank	Votes	Rank	Place
1	Niko	"One"	92	11	2,576	3	6
2	Dāvids Kalandija and Dināra	"Fool in Love"	74	9	569	11	11
3	Antra Stafecka	"When You Are With Me"	42	4	1,467	5	4
4	PeR	"Sad Trumpet"	58	6	467	12	10
5	Pieneņu Vīns	"The One"	90	10	857	7	9
6	Marta Ritova	"I Am Who I Am"	28	3	1,958	4	3
7	Liene Candy	"Higher and Higher"	51	5	713	9	7
8	Samanta Tīna	"I Need a Hero"	25	2	3,305	2	2
9	Ieva Sutugova	"Cold Heart"	67	8	843	8	8
10	Headline	"Love"	64	7	918	6	5
11	Sabīne Berezina	"Upside Down"	95	12	678	10	12
12	PeR	"Here We Go"	16	1	3,847	1	1

Superfinal – 16 February 2013
R/O	Artist	Song	Jury		Televote		Place
R/O	Artist	Song	Votes	Rank	Votes	Rank	Place
1	Marta Ritova	"I Am Who I Am"	20	2	3,318	3	3
2	PeR	"Here We Go"	11	1	6,289	1	1
3	Samanta Tīna	"I Need a Hero"	23	3	6,204	2	2

=== Promotion ===
PeR specifically promoted "Here We Go" as the Latvian Eurovision entry on 21 April by performing during the London Eurovision Party, which was held at the Café de Paris venue in London, United Kingdom and hosted by Nicki French and Paddy O'Connell. The group also took part in promotional activities in Estonia on 1 May with appearances on ERR, TV3+, Raadio 2, Raadio 4 and Skyraadio.

== At Eurovision ==
According to Eurovision rules, all nations with the exceptions of the host country and the "Big Five" (France, Germany, Italy, Spain and the United Kingdom) are required to qualify from one of two semi-finals in order to compete for the final; the top ten countries from each semi-final progress to the final. The European Broadcasting Union (EBU) split up the competing countries into six different pots based on voting patterns from previous contests, with countries with favourable voting histories put into the same pot. On 17 January 2013, a special allocation draw was held which placed each country into one of the two semi-finals, as well as which half of the show they would perform in. Latvia was placed into the second semi-final, to be held on 16 May 2013, and was scheduled to perform in the first half of the show.

Once all the competing songs for the 2013 contest had been released, the running order for the semi-finals was decided by the shows' producers rather than through another draw, so that similar songs were not placed next to each other. Latvia was set to open the show and perform in position 1, before the entry from San Marino.

The two semi-finals and the final were broadcast in Latvia on LTV1 with all shows featuring commentary by Valters Frīdenbergs who was joined by Kārlis Būmeisters for the final. The Latvian spokesperson, who announced the Latvian votes during the final, was Anmary.

=== Semi-final ===
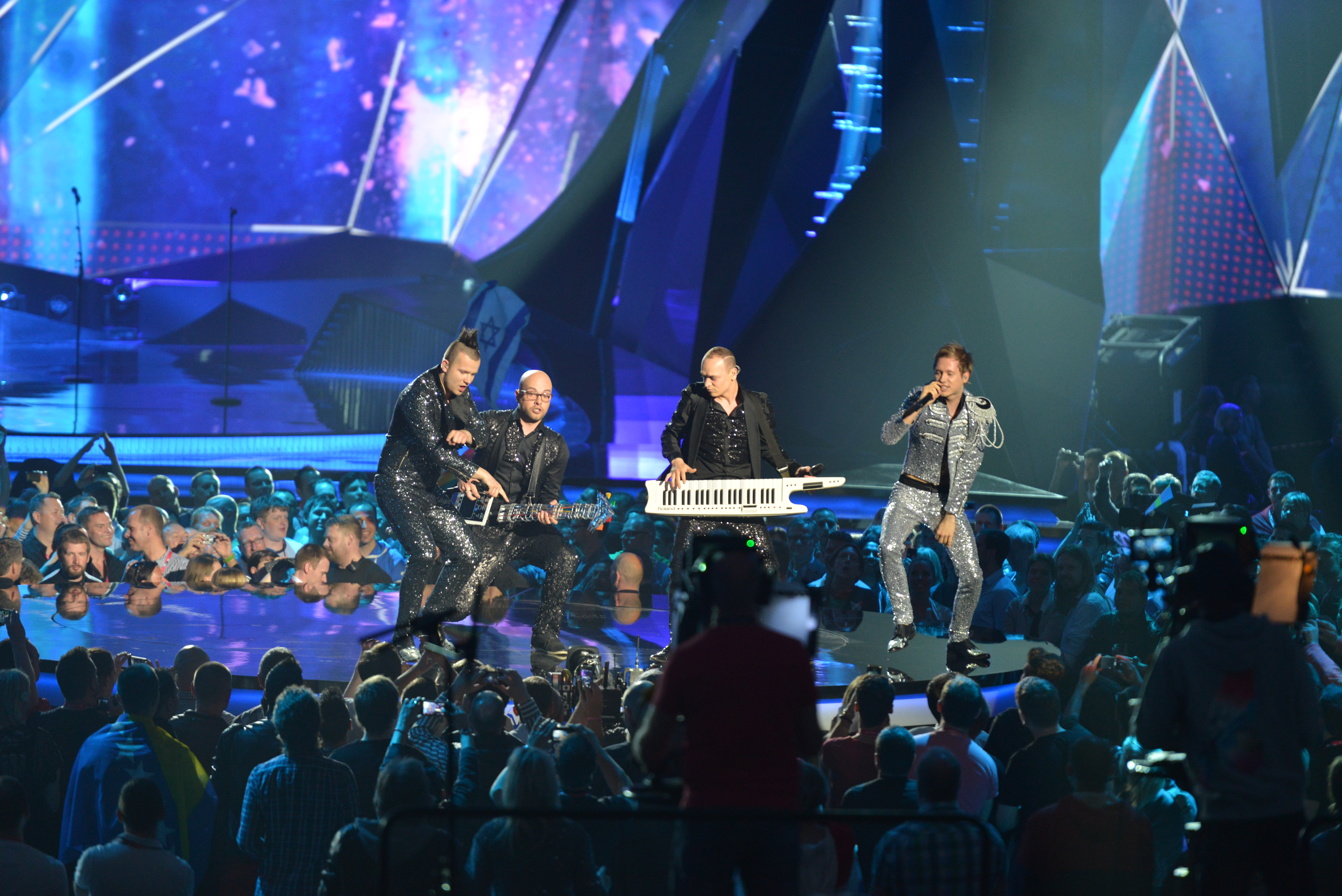
PeR during a rehearsal before the second semi-final

PeR took part in technical rehearsals on 8 and 11 May, followed by dress rehearsals on 15 and 16 May. This included the jury show on 15 May where the professional juries of each country watched and voted on the competing entries.

The Latvian performance featured the members of PeR wearing silver and black glittery costumes and joined on stage by two backing performers, one of them which played an electric guitar with LED screens attached. Toward the end of the song, the performers moved towards the catwalk and group member Ralfs Eilands concluded the performance with a stage dive. The stage and background LED screens displayed colourful rotating spotlights. The choreographer for the Latvian performance was Adrienne Åbjörn. The two backing performers that joined PeR were: the co-composer of "Here We Go" Arturas Burke and Lauris Valters.

At the end of the show, Latvia was not announced among the top 10 entries in the second semi-final and therefore failed to qualify to compete in the final. It was later revealed that Latvia placed seventeenth (last) in the semi-final, receiving a total of 13 points.

=== Voting ===
Voting during the three shows consisted of 50 percent public televoting and 50 percent from a jury deliberation. The jury consisted of five music industry professionals who were citizens of the country they represent, with their names published before the contest to ensure transparency. This jury was asked to judge each contestant based on: vocal capacity; the stage performance; the song's composition and originality; and the overall impression by the act. In addition, no member of a national jury could be related in any way to any of the competing acts in such a way that they cannot vote impartially and independently. The individual rankings of each jury member were released shortly after the grand final.

Following the release of the full split voting by the EBU after the conclusion of the competition, it was revealed that Latvia had placed seventeenth (last) with the public televote and fifteenth with the jury vote in the first semi-final. In the public vote, Latvia received an average rank of 13.28, while with the jury vote, Latvia received an average rank of 9.90.

Below is a breakdown of points awarded to Latvia and awarded by Latvia in the first semi-final and grand final of the contest. The nation awarded its 12 points to Norway in the semi-final and to Russia in the final of the contest.

==== Points awarded to Latvia ====
Points awarded to Latvia (Semi-final 2)
Score	Country
12 points	
10 points	
8 points	
7 points	Georgia
6 points	
5 points	
4 points	
3 points	Iceland
2 points	Macedonia
1 point	Switzerland

==== Points awarded by Latvia ====
Points awarded by Latvia (Semi-final 2)
Score	Country
12 points	Norway
10 points	Iceland
8 points	Finland
7 points	Azerbaijan
6 points	Malta
5 points	Greece
4 points	Georgia
3 points	San Marino
2 points	Hungary
1 point	Armenia

Points awarded by Latvia (Final)
Score	Country
12 points	Russia
10 points	Estonia
8 points	Norway
7 points	Ukraine
6 points	Denmark
5 points	Malta
4 points	Sweden
3 points	Azerbaijan
2 points	Belgium
1 point	Greece
