= Latvia in the Eurovision Song Contest 2012 =

- Eurovision Song Contest 2012
- Participating broadcaster: Latvijas Televīzija (LTV)
- Country: Latvia
- Selection process: Eirodziesma 2012
- Selection date: 18 February 2012

Competing entry
- Song: "Beautiful Song"
- Artist: Anmary
- Songwriters: Ivars Makstnieks; Rolans Ūdris

Placement
- Semi-final result: Failed to qualify (16th)

Participation chronology

Latvia was represented at the Eurovision Song Contest 2012 with the song "Beautiful Song", written by Ivars Makstnieks and Rolans Ūdris, and performed by Anmary. The Latvian participating broadcaster, Latvijas Televīzija (LTV), organised the national final Eirodziesma 2012 in order to select its entry for the contest. Twenty songs were selected to compete in the national final, which consisted of three shows: two semi-finals and a final. In the semi-finals on 7 and 14 January 2012, five entries were selected to advance from each show. Ten songs ultimately qualified to compete in the final on 7 January 2012 where two rounds of voting by a public televote and a ten-member jury panel selected "Beautiful Song" performed by Anmary as the winner.

Latvia was drawn to compete in the first semi-final of the Eurovision Song Contest which took place on 22 May 2012. Performed during the show in position four, "Beautiful Song" was not announced among the top 10 entries of the first semi-final and therefore did not qualify to compete in the final. It was later revealed that Latvia placed sixteenth out of the 18 participating countries in the semi-final with 17 points.

== Background ==
Prior to the 2012 contest, Latvijas Televīzija (LTV) had participated in the Eurovision Song Contest representing Latvia twelve times since its first entry in 2000. Latvia won the contest once in 2002 with the song "I Wanna" performed by Marie N. Following the introduction of semi-finals for the 2004, Latvia was able to qualify to compete in the final between 2005 and 2008. Between 2009 and 2011, the nation had failed to qualify to the final for three consecutive years including with their 2011 entry "Angel in Disguise" performed by Musiqq.

As part of its duties as participating broadcaster, LTV organises the selection of its entry in the Eurovision Song Contest and broadcasts the event in the country. The broadcaster confirmed its intentions to participate at the 2012 contest on 29 August 2011. LTV has selected its entries for the Eurovision Song Contest through a national final. Since their debut in 2000, LTV had organised the selection show Eirodziesma. Along with its participation confirmation, the broadcaster announced that they would organise Eirodziesma 2012 in order to select its entry for the 2012 contest.

== Before Eurovision ==
=== Eirodziesma 2012 ===
Eirodziesma 2012 was the thirteenth edition of Eirodziesma, the music competition that selects Latvia's entries for the Eurovision Song Contest. The competition commenced with the first of two-semi finals on 7 January 2012 and concluded with a final on 18 February 2012. All shows in the competition were hosted by Valters Frīdenbergs, Kristine Virsnite and Jolanta Strikaite and broadcast on LTV1 as well as online via the broadcaster's official website ltv.lv. The final was also streamed online at the official Eurovision Song Contest website eurovision.tv.

==== Format ====
The format of the competition consisted of three shows: two semi-finals and a final. The two semi-finals, held on 7 and 14 January 2012, each featured ten competing entries from which the top five advanced to the final from each show. The final, held on 18 February 2012, selected the Latvian entry for Baku from the remaining ten entries over two rounds of voting: the first round selected the top three songs and the second round (superfinal) selected the winner. Results during the semi-final and final shows were determined by the 50/50 combination of votes from a jury panel and a public vote. Both the jury and public vote assigned points from 1-8, 10 and 12 in the semi-finals and the first round of the final, while the jury and public both assigned 8, 10 and 12 points to the three competing songs in the superfinal. Ties were decided in favour of the entries that received higher points from the public. Viewers were able to vote via telephone up to five times or via SMS with a single SMS counting as five votes.

==== Competing entries ====
Artists and songwriters were able to submit their entries to the broadcaster between 1 September 2011 and 14 October 2011. 71 entries were submitted at the conclusion of the submission period. The submitted songs were listed online on the website eirovizija.lv allowing users to vote for their favourite entries between 20 October 2011 and 1 November 2011. 15,279 online votes were received and a jury panel appointed by LTV evaluated the submitted songs and selected twenty entries for the competition, taking the results of the online vote into consideration. The jury panel consisted of Aivars Hermanis (composer, arranger and producer), Jolanta Gulbe (singer and vocal teacher), Zigfrīds Muktupāvels (singer and musician), Dace Pūce (director and producer), Olga Žitluhina (choreographer), Natalija Jansone (fashion designer) and members of the LTV Eurovision team. The performer auditions took place on 10 November 2011 where the jury panel evaluated the performances of the twenty songs and either approved or rejected their performers. The twenty competing songs were announced during a press conference on 8 November 2011, while the competing artists were announced on 1 December 2011. Among the artists were Andris Ābelīte who represented Latvia in the Eurovision Song Contest 2007 as part of the group Bonaparti.lv and Jānis Vaišļa (member of Mad Show Boys) who represented Latvia in the Eurovision Song Contest 2008 as part of the group Pirates of the Sea. "We Can Change the World" performed by Andris Ābelīte was performed in English for the semi-final, but the artist decided to translate the song to Latvian for the final.

Artist	Song	Songwriter(s)
Andris Ābelīte	"Pēdējais vārds"	Andris Ābelīte
Andris Ābelīte	"We Can Change the World"	Andris Ābelīte
Angelina and Alisa May	"Rollin' Up"	Jevgeņijs Ustinskovs, Alisa May
Anmary	"Beautiful Song"	Ivars Makstnieks, Rolans Ūdris
Atis Ieviņš	"Dancer"	Artūrs Mangulis
Elizabete Zagorska	"You Are a Star"	Atis Auzāns, Kārlis Streips
Laura Bicāne and Romāns Sladzis	"Freakin' Out"	Laura Bicāne
Mad Show Boys	"Music Thief"	Garijs Poļskis
Maia	"No Limits to Dream"	Edgars Beļickis, Edgars Jass, Raitis Aukšmuksts, Maia
Miks Dukurs and NBC	"Sweet for Me"	Miks Dukurs, Georgijs Girbu
Nikolajs Puzikovs	"Mīlestības nevar būt par daudz"	Artūrs Palkevičs, Guntars Račs
Paula Dukure	"Celebration"	Edijs Dukurs, Miks Dukurs
Paul Swan	"Wanna Be With You"	Kaspars Pudniks, Paul Swan
PeR	"Disco Superfly"	Ralfs Eilands, Edmunds Rasmanis
Roberts Pētersons	"She's a Queen"	Austris Rietums, Līga Markova
Rūta Dūduma	"My World"	Rūta Dūduma
Samanta Tīna	"For Father"	Elmārs Orols, Samanta Tīna
Samanta Tīna and Dāvids Kalandija	"I Want You Back"	Mārtiņš Grunte, Oskars Maizītis
The 4	"Get It Started"	BuGaGa Project, Sandris Vestmanis
Triānas parks	"Stars Are My Family"	Aivars Rakovskis, Agnese Rakovska
Valters Gleške and Lība Ēce	"Better World"	Valters Gleške, Māris Orehovs

==== Semi-finals ====
The two semi-finals took place at the NA Studio in Marupe on 7 and 14 January 2012. In each semi-final ten acts competed and the top five entries qualified to the final based on the combination of votes from a jury panel and the Latvian public. The jury panel that voted in the first semi-final consisted of Marts Kristiāns Kalniņš (musician), Ieva Kerēvica (singer and vocal teacher), Daira Āboltiņa (film critic), Sandris Vanzovičs (music journalist), Jānis Vinters (motorcyclist and farmer), Binnija Ārberga (beauty salon owner), Yana Kay (member of 2003 Latvian Eurovision entrant F.L.Y.), Emīls Balceris (member of 2011 Latvian Eurovision entrant Musiqq), Jānis Žaržeckis (plastic surgeon) and Elīna Breice (choreographer), while the jury panel that voted in the second semi-final consisted of Uldis Marhilēvičs (composer), Māra Upmane-Holšteina (singer), Alberts Kivlenieks (choreographer), Šeila (fashion artist), Jānis Deinats (photographer), Laima Liberte (Draugiem.lv project manager), Ilona Brūvere (director), Akvelīna Līvmane (actress), Kārlis Auzāns (producer and composer) and Jānis Stībelis (musician).

Semi-final 1 – 7 January 2012
R/O	Artist	Song	Jury		Televote		Total	Place
R/O	Artist	Song	Votes	Points	Votes	Points	Total	Place
1	Atis Ieviņš	"Dancer"	54	4	342	1	5	10
2	Nikolajs Puzikovs	"Mīlestības nevar būt par daudz"	31	2	833	3	5	9
3	Maia	"No Limits to Dream"	68	7	485	2	9	7
4	Samanta Tīna and Dāvids Kalandija	"I Want You Back"	72	8	924	5	13	5
5	Angelina and Alisa May	"Rollin' Up"	23	1	1,108	6	7	8
6	Laura Bicāne and Romāns Sladzis	"Freakin' Out"	39	3	1,431	8	11	6
7	Paula Dukure	"Celebration"	86	12	849	4	16	3
8	Andris Ābelīte	"We Can Change the World"	59	5	1,865	12	17	2
9	Rūta Dūduma	"My World"	66	6	1,123	7	13	4
10	PeR	"Disco Superfly"	82	10	1,584	10	20	1

Semi-final 2 – 14 January 2012
R/O	Artist	Song	Jury		Televote		Total	Place
R/O	Artist	Song	Votes	Points	Votes	Points	Total	Place
1	Miks Dukurs and NBC	"Sweet for Me"	50	5	455	2	7	9
2	Valters Gleške and Lība Ēce	"Better World"	34	2	1,912	10	12	6
3	The 4	"Get It Started"	35	3	802	4	7	8
4	Anmary	"Beautiful Song"	67	7	1,265	7	14	3
5	Paul Swan	"Wanna Be With You"	22	1	219	1	2	10
6	Roberts Pētersons	"She's a Queen"	61	6	1,330	8	14	2
7	Samanta Tīna	"For Father"	47	4	1,018	6	10	7
8	Elizabete Zagorska	"You Are a Star"	89	10	780	3	13	5
9	Mad Show Boys	"Music Thief"	97	12	1,988	12	24	1
10	Triānas parks	"Stars Are My Family"	78	8	961	5	13	4

==== Final ====
The final took place at the Rio Cinema in Ventspils on 18 February 2012. The ten entries that qualified from the preceding two semi-finals competed and the winner was selected over two rounds of voting. In the first round, the top three songs advanced to the second round, the superfinal, based on the combination of votes from a jury panel and the Latvian public. In the superfinal, the song with the highest number of votes from the jury and public, "Beautiful Song" performed by Anmary, was declared the winner. The jury panel that voted in the final consisted of Marija Naumova (Latvian Eurovision Song Contest 2002 winner), Olga Rajecka (singer), Andris Ērglis (singer), Raimonds Tiguls (composer), Daiga Mazvērsīte (musicologist and Latvijas Radio 2 program manager), Sigita Jevgļevska (actress), Jānis Šipkēvics (chairman of the board of Radio SWH), Raimonds Bergmanis (weightlifter), Biruta Ozoliņa (singer and musician) and Elmans Zeinalovs (Ambassador of the Azerbaijan Republic to Latvia).

In addition to the performances of the competing entries, guest performers included Olga Rajecka, cello trio DaGamba, 2011 Latvian Eurovision entrant Musiqq and 2012 Swiss Eurovision entrant Sinplus.

Final – 18 February 2012
R/O	Artist	Song	Jury		Televote		Total	Place
R/O	Artist	Song	Votes	Points	Votes	Points	Total	Place
1	Rūta Dūduma	"My World"	74	12	478	2	14	4
2	Samanta Tīna and Dāvids Kalandija	"I Want You Back"	74	10	973	6	16	2
3	PeR	"Disco Superfly"	65	5	2,394	8	13	5
4	Triānas parks	"Stars Are My Family"	55	4	500	3	6	9
5	Paula Dukure	"Celebration"	69	7	530	4	11	8
6	Andris Ābelīte	"Pēdējais vārds"	66	6	967	5	11	7
7	Anmary	"Beautiful Song"	70	8	3,039	10	18	1
8	Elizabete Zagorska	"You Are a Star"	18	1	297	1	2	10
9	Mad Show Boys	"Music Thief"	34	2	3,081	12	14	3
10	Roberts Pētersons	"She's a Queen"	55	4	1,420	7	11	6

Superfinal – 18 February 2012
R/O	Artist	Song	Jury		Televote		Total	Place
R/O	Artist	Song	Votes	Points	Votes	Points	Total	Place
1	Samanta Tīna and Dāvids Kalandija	"I Want You Back"	112	12	918	8	20	2
2	Anmary	"Beautiful Song"	104	10	4,645	12	22	1
3	Mad Show Boys	"Music Thief"	84	8	4,218	10	18	3

=== Preparation ===
On 16 March, Anmary released the official music video for "Beautiful Song" which was directed by Aija Strazdiņa, choreographed by the Most Wanted Crew studio, and filmed in Riga at the studios of Radio SWH and Sound Division as well as at the Ēdole Castle and the Riga International Airport.

=== Promotion ===
Anmary specifically promoted "Beautiful Song" as the Latvian Eurovision entry by performing during the Eurovision in Concert event which was held at the Melkweg venue in Amsterdam, Netherlands and hosted by Ruth Jacott and Cornald Maas on 21 April.

== At Eurovision ==
According to Eurovision rules, all nations with the exceptions of the host country and the "Big Five" (France, Germany, Italy, Spain and the United Kingdom) are required to qualify from one of two semi-finals in order to compete for the final; the top ten countries from each semi-final progress to the final. The European Broadcasting Union (EBU) split up the competing countries into six different pots based on voting patterns from previous contests, with countries with favourable voting histories put into the same pot. On 25 January 2012, a special allocation draw was held which placed each country into one of the two semi-finals, as well as which half of the show they would perform in. Latvia was placed into the first semi-final, to be held on 22 May 2012, and was scheduled to perform in the first half of the show. The running order for the semi-finals was decided through another draw on 20 March 2012 and Latvia was set to perform in position 4, following the entry from Greece and before the entry from Albania.

The two semi-finals and the final were broadcast in Latvia on LTV1 with all shows featuring commentary by Valters Frīdenbergs who was joined by Kārlis Būmeisters for the final. The Latvian spokesperson, who announced the Latvian votes during the final, was Valters Frīdenbergs.

=== Semi-final ===
Anmary took part in technical rehearsals on 13 and 17 May, followed by dress rehearsals on 21 and 22 May. This included the jury show on 5 May where the professional juries of each country watched and voted on the competing entries.

The Latvian performance featured Anmary in a short light blue dress designed by Latvian designer Indra Salceviča, joined on stage by four backing vocalists also in short dresses of various colours. The performers, which moved freely around the stage doing a casual routine choreographed by Santa Grinfelde, began the performance by having a mock chat between themselves. The LED screens displayed a retro kaleidoscope effect that interchange and rotate throughout the performance. The four backing vocalists that joined Anmary were: Anita Levša, Anna Zhukova, Jeļena Matule and Līga Robežniece.

At the end of the show, Latvia was not announced among the top 10 entries in the first semi-final and therefore failed to qualify to compete in the final. It was later revealed that Latvia placed sixteenth in the semi-final, receiving a total of 17 points.

=== Voting ===
Voting during the three shows consisted of 50 percent public televoting and 50 percent from a jury deliberation. The jury consisted of five music industry professionals who were citizens of the country they represent, with their names published before the contest to ensure transparency. This jury was asked to judge each contestant based on: vocal capacity; the stage performance; the song's composition and originality; and the overall impression by the act. In addition, no member of a national jury could be related in any way to any of the competing acts in such a way that they cannot vote impartially and independently. The individual rankings of each jury member were released shortly after the grand final.

Following the release of the full split voting by the EBU after the conclusion of the competition, it was revealed that Latvia had placed fifteenth with the public televote and eighteenth (last) with the jury vote in the first semi-final. In the public vote, Latvia scored 18 points, while with the jury vote, Latvia scored 17 points.

Below is a breakdown of points awarded to Latvia and awarded by Latvia in the first semi-final and grand final of the contest. The nation awarded its 12 points to Russia in the semi-final and to Sweden in the final of the contest.

==== Points awarded to Latvia ====
Points awarded to Latvia (Semi-final 1)
Score	Country
12 points	
10 points	
8 points	
7 points	
6 points	
5 points	
4 points	Ireland; Moldova; Russia
3 points	Azerbaijan
2 points	Montenegro
1 point	

==== Points awarded by Latvia ====
Points awarded by Latvia (Semi-final 1)
Score	Country
12 points	Russia
10 points	Ireland
8 points	Denmark
7 points	Switzerland
6 points	Finland
5 points	Iceland
4 points	Albania
3 points	Cyprus
2 points	Moldova
1 point	Israel

Points awarded by Latvia (Final)
Score	Country
12 points	Sweden
10 points	Russia
8 points	Estonia
7 points	Germany
6 points	Ukraine
5 points	Ireland
4 points	Lithuania
3 points	France
2 points	United Kingdom
1 point	Albania
