= Latvia in the Eurovision Song Contest =

- Eurovision Song Contest
- Participating broadcaster: Latvian Public Service Media (LSM; 2025–present) Formerly: Latvijas Televīzija (LTV; 2000–2024)

Participation summary
- Appearances: 26 (12 finals)
- First appearance: 2000
- Highest placement: 1st: 2002
- Host: 2003
- Participation history: 2000; 2001; 2002; 2003; 2004; 2005; 2006; 2007; 2008; 2009; 2010; 2011; 2012; 2013; 2014; 2015; 2016; 2017; 2018; 2019; ~~2020~~; 2021; 2022; 2023; 2024; 2025; 2026

Related articles
- Supernova

External links
- LSM page
- Latvia's page at Eurovision.com
- For the most recent participation see Latvia in the Eurovision Song Contest 2026

Latvia has been represented at the Eurovision Song Contest 26 times since making its debut at the contest in 2000, where the song "My Star" performed by the group Brainstorm finished third. Latvia won the contest in 2002, with the song "I Wanna" by Marie N, defeating Malta by 12 points. Latvia is the second former Soviet country to win the contest. The 2003 contest was held in the Latvian capital Riga. The country achieved its third top 10 result in 2005, when "The War Is Not Over" by Walters and Kazha finished fifth. The current Latvian participating broadcaster in the contest is Latvian Public Service Media (LSM).

Latvia did not participate in the final from 2009 to 2014, when they failed to qualify from the semi-finals for six consecutive years, including finishing last on three occasions, in 2009, 2010, and 2013. Latvia qualified for the final for the first time since 2008 at the 2015 contest with the song "Love Injected" by Aminata. Its sixth place in the final is Latvia's fourth top 10 finish and best result in the contest since 2005. Latvia made its 10th appearance in the final in 2016. After failing to qualify for the final from 2017 to 2023, it finally managed to qualify to the final in the 2024 contest with "Hollow" by Dons. The qualification streak was extended by Tautumeitas, whose song "Bur man laimi" became the first Latvian language entry to compete in a Eurovision final. After managing to qualify for two editions after their seven year absence in the final, Latvia once again failed to qualify for the final in 2026 with Atvara and her song "Ēnā".

Latvia has the distinction of having finished last in the Eurovision semi-finals more than any other country. Since its introduction in 2004, Latvia has finished last in five semi-finals, with "Probka" by Intars Busulis (2009), "What For?" by Aisha (2010), "Here We Go" by PeR (2013), "Line" by Triana Park (2017), and "The Moon Is Rising" by Samanta Tīna (2021).

== Participation ==
Latvijas Televīzija (LTV) was a full member of the European Broadcasting Union (EBU) from 1st January 1993, thus eligible to participate in the Eurovision Song Contest from then. It participated in the contest representing Latvia from the 45th edition in 2000. Prior to 2000, it had previously considered to debut in the contest in 1993, however the planned entry failed to materialize, and then in 1999, when it withdrew its participation at a late stage. Since 2025, after a restructuring that led to the incorporation of LTV into the current Latvian Public Service Media (LSM) organisation, it has been the latter who participates representing Latvia.

LTV and LSM have chosen all their entrants in the contest through a national final, with the exception of "The Moon Is Rising" performed by Samanta Tīna in 2021. (Note: Tīna won Supernova in 2020, but that year's Eurovision was cancelled due to the COVID-19 pandemic, and she was later internally selected to represent her country in the following year instead.) Since 2015, the Latvian national selection is Supernova. Previously, the national selections were Eirodziesma (2000–2012) and Dziesma (2013–2014).

== Participation overview ==
Table key
| 1 | First place |
| 2 | Second place |
| 3 | Third place |
| ◁ | Last place |
| ◇ | Entry selected but did not compete |

| Year | Artist | Song | Language | Final | Points | Semi | Points |
|---|---|---|---|---|---|---|---|
| 2000 | Brainstorm | "My Star" | English | 3 | 136 | No semi-finals | |
| 2001 | Arnis Mednis | "Too Much" | English | 18 | 16 | No semi-finals | |
| 2002 | Marie N | "I Wanna" | English | 1 | 176 | No semi-finals | |
| 2003 | F.L.Y. | "Hello from Mars" | English | 24 | 5 | No semi-finals | |
| 2004 | Fomins and Kleins | "Dziesma par laimi" | Latvian | Failed to qualify | | 17 | 23 |
| 2005 | Walters and Kazha | "The War Is Not Over" | English | 5 | 153 | 10 | 85 |
| 2006 | Vocal Group Cosmos | "I Hear Your Heart" | English | 16 | 30 | Top 11 in 2005 final (Note: According to the then-Eurovision rules, the top ten non-Big Four countries from the previous year along with the Big Four automatically qualified for the grand final without having to compete in semi-finals. For example, if Germany and France placed inside the top ten, the 11th and 12th spots were advanced to next year's grand final along with all countries ranked in the top ten.) | |
| 2007 | Bonaparti.lv | "Questa notte" | Italian | 16 | 54 | 5 | 168 |
| 2008 | Pirates of the Sea | "Wolves of the Sea" | English | 12 | 83 | 6 | 86 |
| 2009 | Intars Busulis | "Probka" (Пробка) | Russian | Failed to qualify | | 19 ◁ | 7 |
| 2010 | Aisha | "What For?" | English | Failed to qualify | | 17 ◁ | 11 |
| 2011 | Musiqq | "Angel in Disguise" | English | Failed to qualify | | 17 | 25 |
| 2012 | Anmary | "Beautiful Song" | English | Failed to qualify | | 16 | 17 |
| 2013 | PeR | "Here We Go" | English | Failed to qualify | | 17 ◁ | 13 |
| 2014 | Aarzemnieki | "Cake to Bake" | English | Failed to qualify | | 13 | 33 |
| 2015 | Aminata | "Love Injected" | English | 6 | 186 | 2 | 155 |
| 2016 | Justs | "Heartbeat" | English | 15 | 132 | 8 | 132 |
| 2017 | Triana Park | "Line" | English | Failed to qualify | | 18 ◁ | 21 |
| 2018 | Laura Rizzotto | "Funny Girl" | English | Failed to qualify | | 12 | 106 |
| 2019 | Carousel | "That Night" | English | Failed to qualify | | 15 | 50 |
| 2020 | Samanta Tīna ◇ | "Still Breathing" ◇ | English ◇ | Contest cancelled (Note: The 2020 contest was cancelled due to the COVID-19 pandemic.) | | | |
| 2021 | Samanta Tīna | "The Moon Is Rising" | English | Failed to qualify | | 17 ◁ | 14 |
| 2022 | Citi Zēni | "Eat Your Salad" | English | Failed to qualify | | 14 | 55 |
| 2023 | Sudden Lights | "Aijā" | English, Latvian | Failed to qualify | | 11 | 34 |
| 2024 | Dons | "Hollow" | English | 16 | 64 | 7 | 72 |
| 2025 | Tautumeitas | "Bur man laimi" | Latvian | 13 | 158 | 2 | 130 |
| 2026 | Atvara | "Ēnā" | Latvian | Failed to qualify | | 13 | 49 |
| 2027 | TBD 6 February 2027 † | | | Upcoming † | | | |

== Songs by language ==
1. English (81.0%)
2. Latvian (11.6%)
3. Italian (3.70%)
4. Russian (3.70%)

| Songs | Language | Years |
|---|---|---|
| 22 | English | 2000, 2001, 2002, 2003, 2005, 2006, 2008, 2010, 2011, 2012, 2013, 2014, 2015, 2016, 2017, 2018, 2019, ~~2020~~, 2021, 2022, 2023, 2024 |
| 4 | Latvian | 2004, 2023, 2025, 2026 |
| 1 | Italian | 2007 |
| 1 | Russian | 2009 |

== Hostings ==
| Year | Location | Venue | Presenters |
|---|---|---|---|
| 2003 | Riga | Skonto Hall | Marija Naumova and Renārs Kaupers |

== Related involvement ==
=== Heads of delegation ===
Each participating broadcaster in the Eurovision Song Contest assigns a head of delegation as the EBU's contact person and the leader of their delegation at the event. The delegation, whose size can greatly vary, includes a head of press, the contestants, songwriters, composers, and backing vocalists, among others.

| Year | Head of delegation | Ref. |
|---|---|---|
| 2012–2020 | Zita Kaminska | |
| 2021– | Guntars Gulbiņš | |

=== Commentators and spokespersons ===
| Year | Television Commentator | Radio commentator | Spokesperson | Ref. |
|---|---|---|---|---|
| 1998 | Kārlis Streips | No broadcast | Did not participate | |
| 1999 | Kārlis Streips | No broadcast | Did not participate | |
| 2000 | Kārlis Streips | No broadcast | Lauris Reiniks | |
| 2001 | Kārlis Streips | No broadcast | Renārs Kaupers | |
| 2002 | Kārlis Streips | No broadcast | Ēriks Niedra | |
| 2003 | Kārlis Streips | No broadcast | Ģirts Līcis | |
| 2004 | Kārlis Streips | No broadcast | Lauris Reiniks | |
| 2005 | Kārlis Streips | No broadcast | Marie N | |
| 2006 | Kārlis Streips | No broadcast | Mārtiņš Freimanis | |
| 2007 | Kārlis Streips | No broadcast | Janis Šipkevics | |
| 2008 | Kārlis Streips | No broadcast | Kristīne Virsnīte | |
| 2009 | Kārlis Streips | No broadcast | Roberto Meloni | |
| 2010 | Kārlis Streips | No broadcast | Kārlis Būmeisters | |
| 2011 | Valters Frīdenbergs (all), Uģis Joksts (final) | No broadcast | Aisha | |
| 2012 | Valters Frīdenbergs (all), Kārlis Būmeisters (final) | No broadcast | Valters Frīdenbergs | |
| 2013 | Valters Frīdenbergs (all), Kārlis Būmeisters (final) | No broadcast | Anmary | |
| 2014 | Valters and Kaža | No broadcast | Ralfs Eilands | |
| 2015 | Valters Frīdenbergs (all), Toms Grēviņš (final) | No broadcast | Markus Riva | |
| 2016 | Valters Frīdenbergs (all), Toms Grēviņš (final) | No broadcast | Toms Grēviņš | |
| 2017 | Valters Frīdenbergs (all), Toms Grēviņš (final) | No broadcast | Aminata | |
| 2018 | Toms Grēviņš (all), Magnuss Eriņš (final) | No broadcast | Dagmāra Legante | |
| 2019 | Toms Grēviņš (all), Ketija Šēnberga (final) | No broadcast | Laura Rizzotto | |
| 2021 | Toms Grēviņš (all), Marija Naumova (final) | No broadcast | Aminata | |
| 2022 | Toms Grēviņš (all), Lauris Reiniks (final) | No broadcast | Samanta Tīna | |
| 2023 | Toms Grēviņš (all), Lauris Reiniks (final) | No broadcast | Jānis Pētersons | |
| 2024 | Toms Grēviņš (all), Lauris Reiniks (final) | No broadcast | Andrejs Reinis Zitmanis | |
| 2025 | Toms Grēviņš (all), Marija Naumova (final) | No broadcast | Dons | |
| 2026 | Toms Grēviņš (all), Ketija Šēnberga (final) | Mārtiņš Pabērzis (Latvijas Radio 5) | Aurēlija Rancāne | |

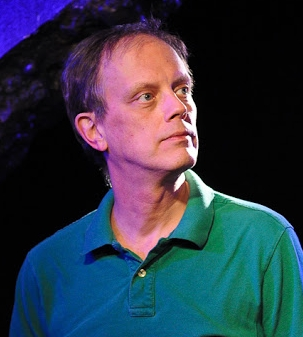
Karlis Streips is the first Latvian Eurovision commentator in history. He provided Eurovision Song Contest commentary until 2010

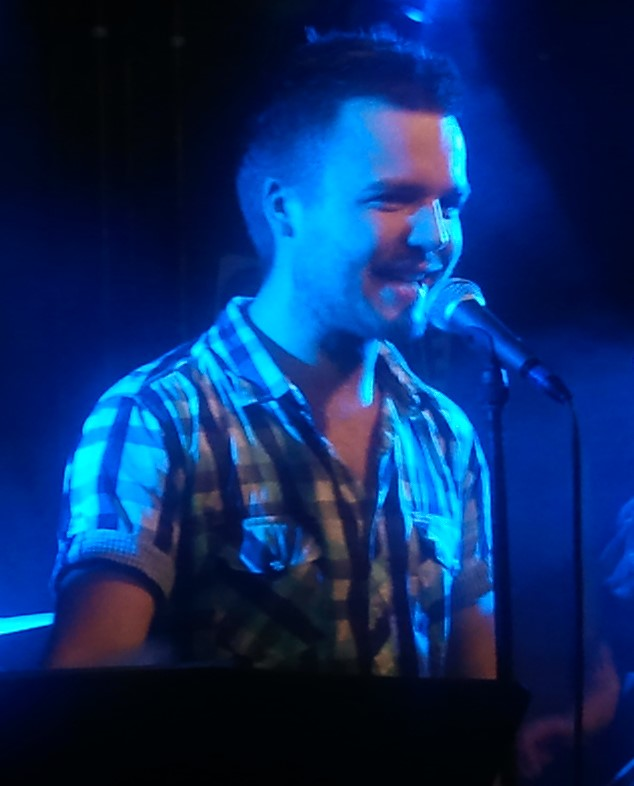
Valters Frīdenbergs was lead commentator from 2011 until his illness in 2017 and death in 2018

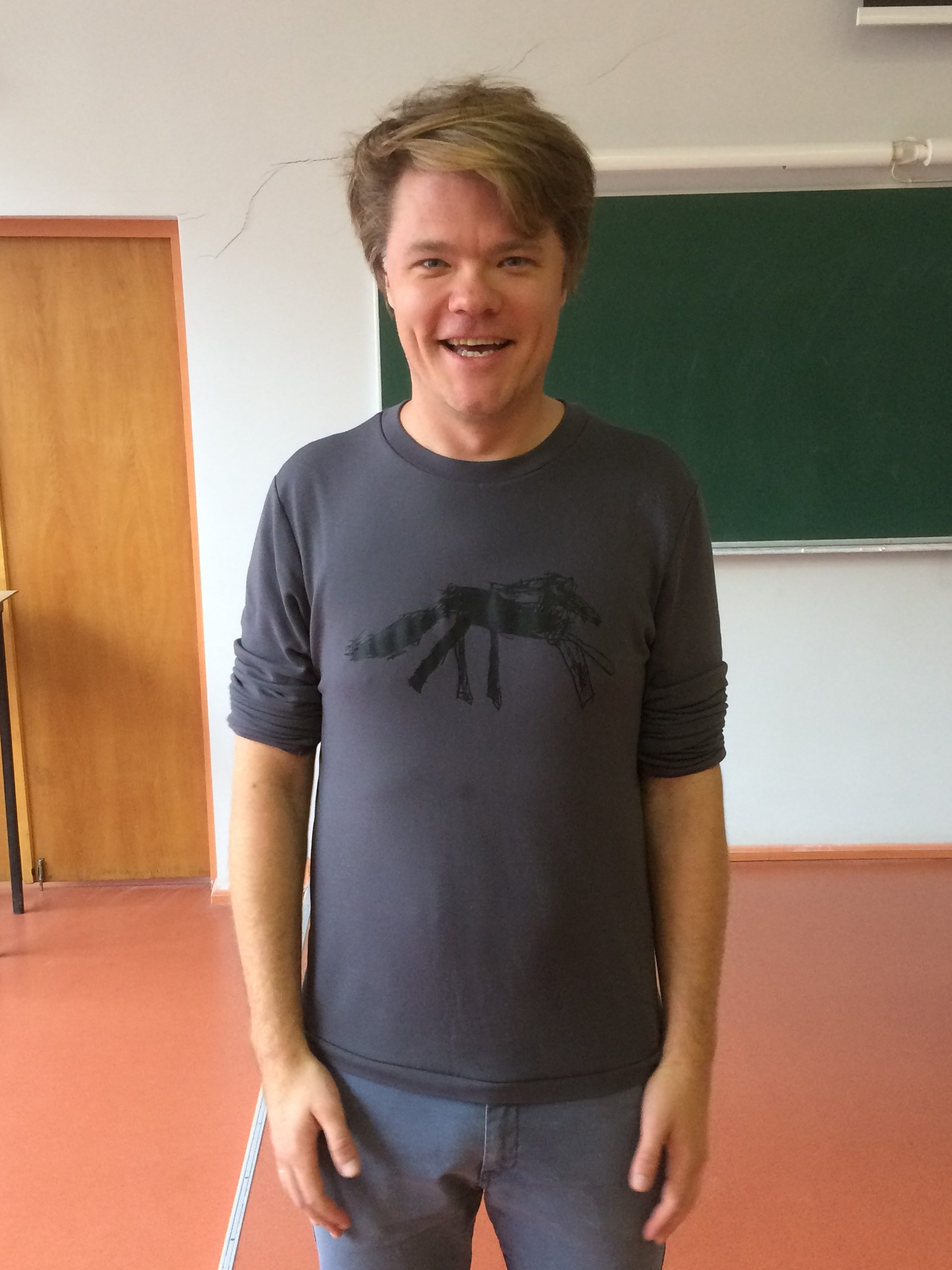
Toms Grēviņš has been lead Latvian commentator since 2018

== Photo gallery ==
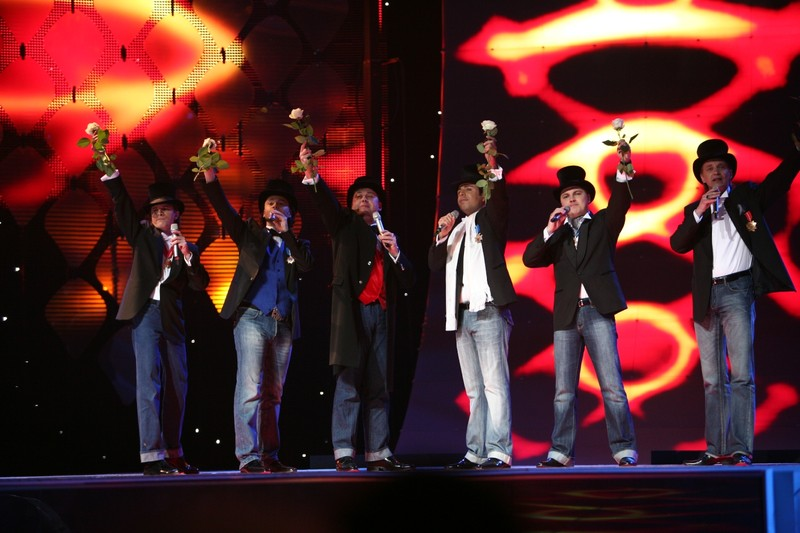
Bonaparti.lv performing "Questa notte" in Helsinki (2007)

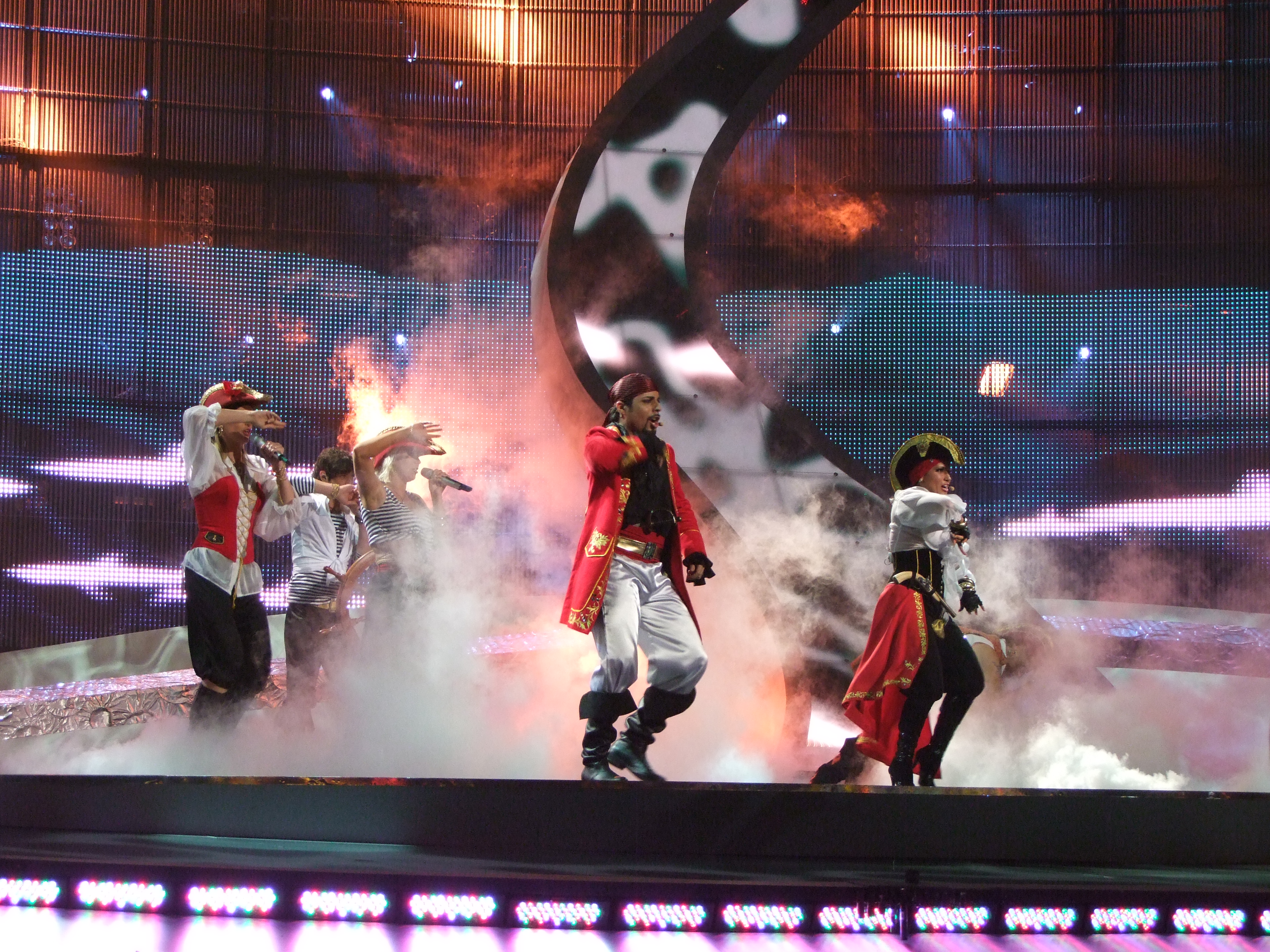
Pirates of the Sea performing "Wolves of the Sea" in Belgrade (2008)

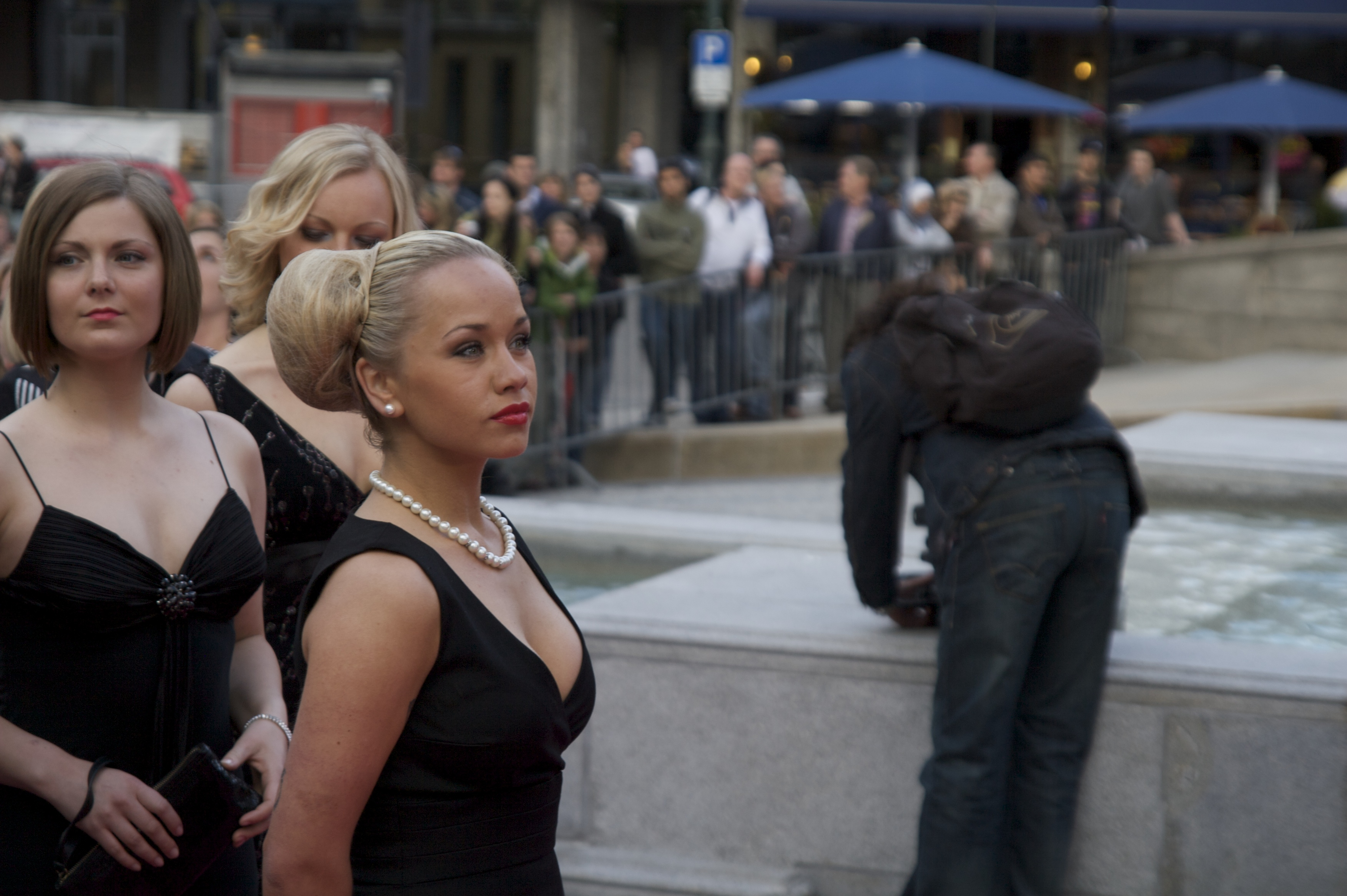
Aisha in Oslo (2010)

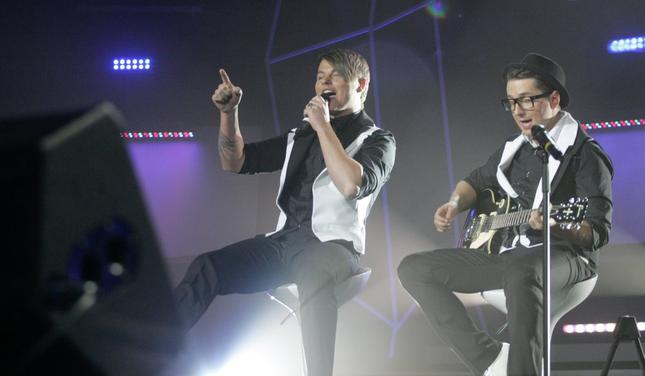
Musiqq performing "Angel in Disguise" in Düsseldorf (2011)

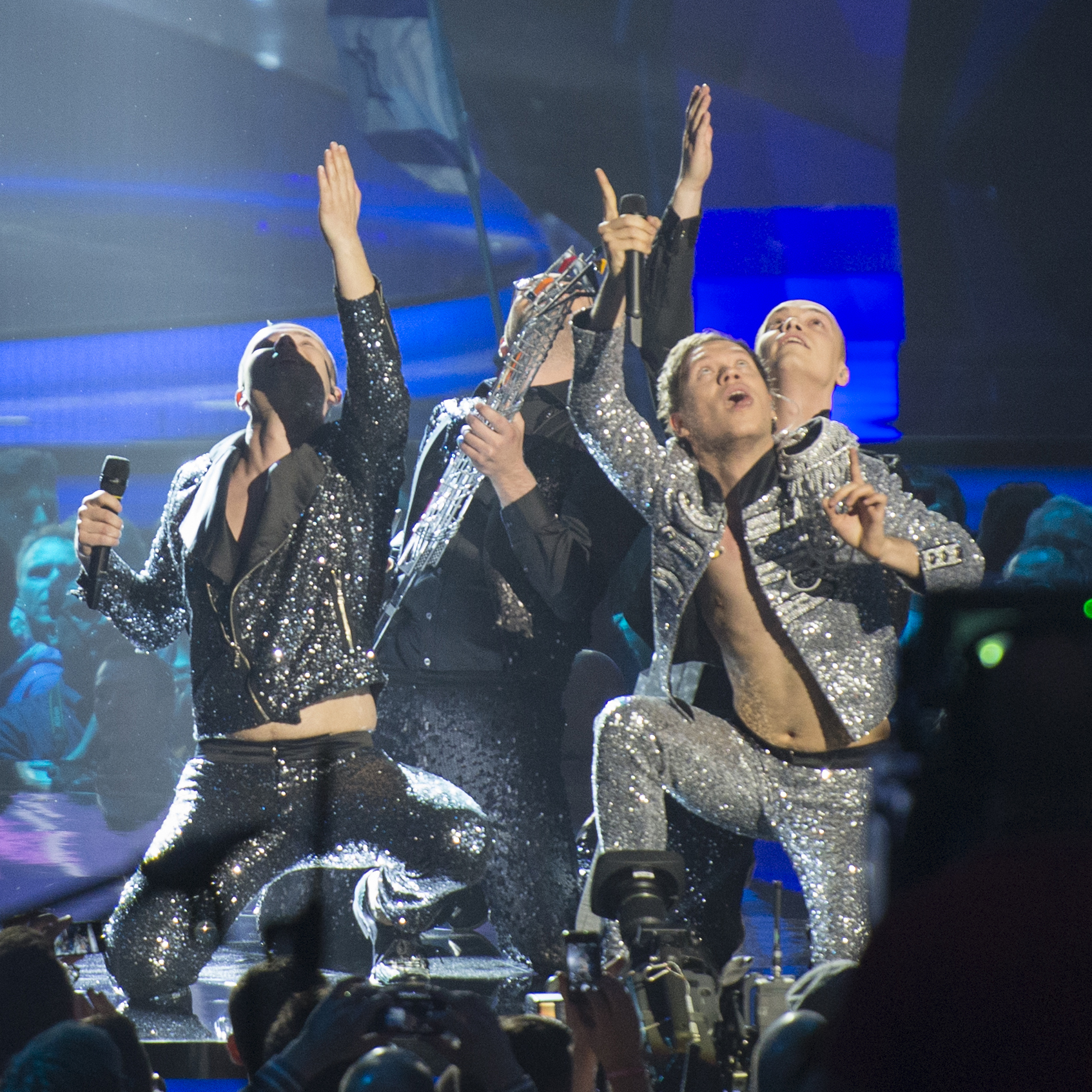
PeR performing "Here We Go" in Malmö (2013)

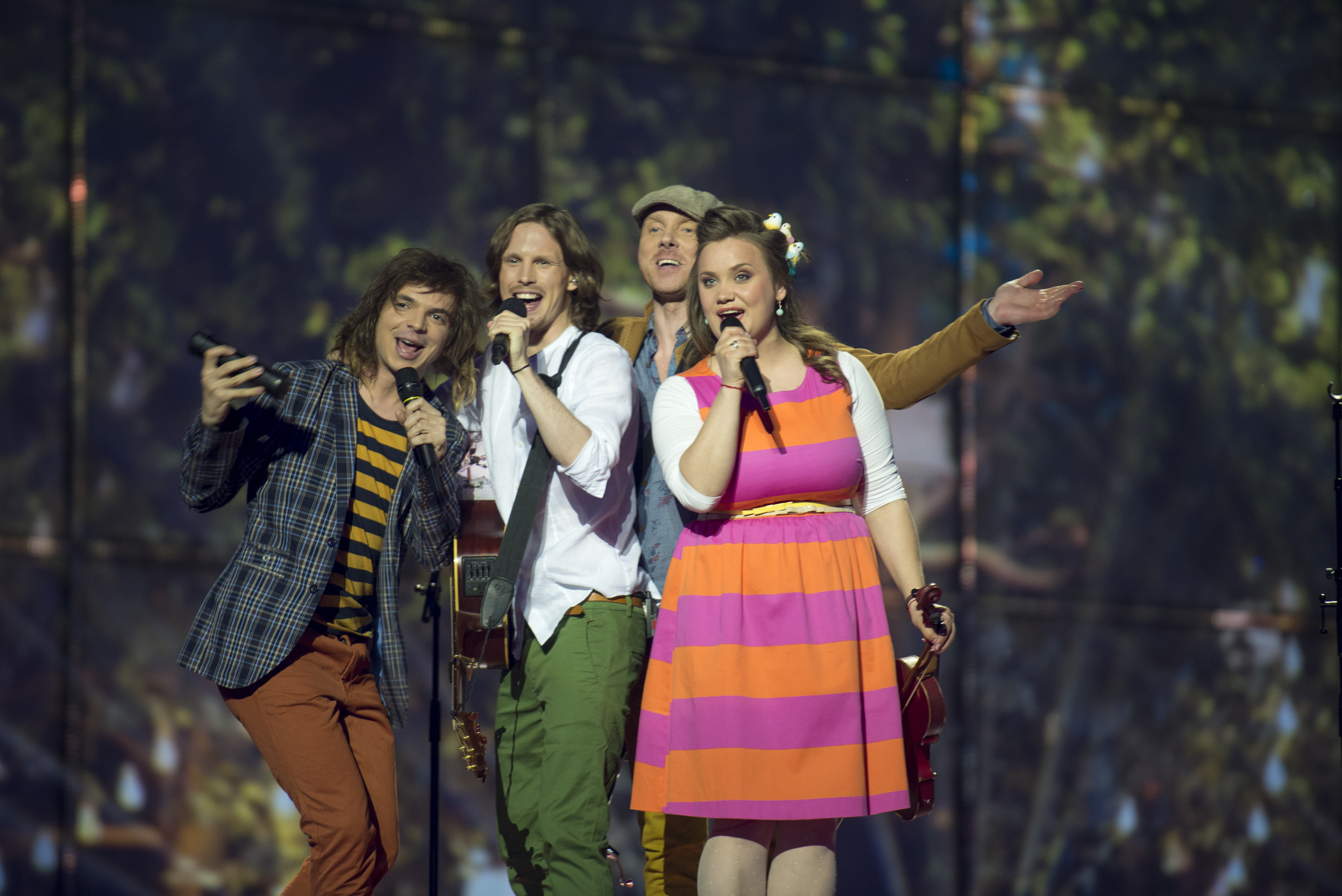
Aarzemnieki performing "Cake to Bake" in Copenhagen (2014)

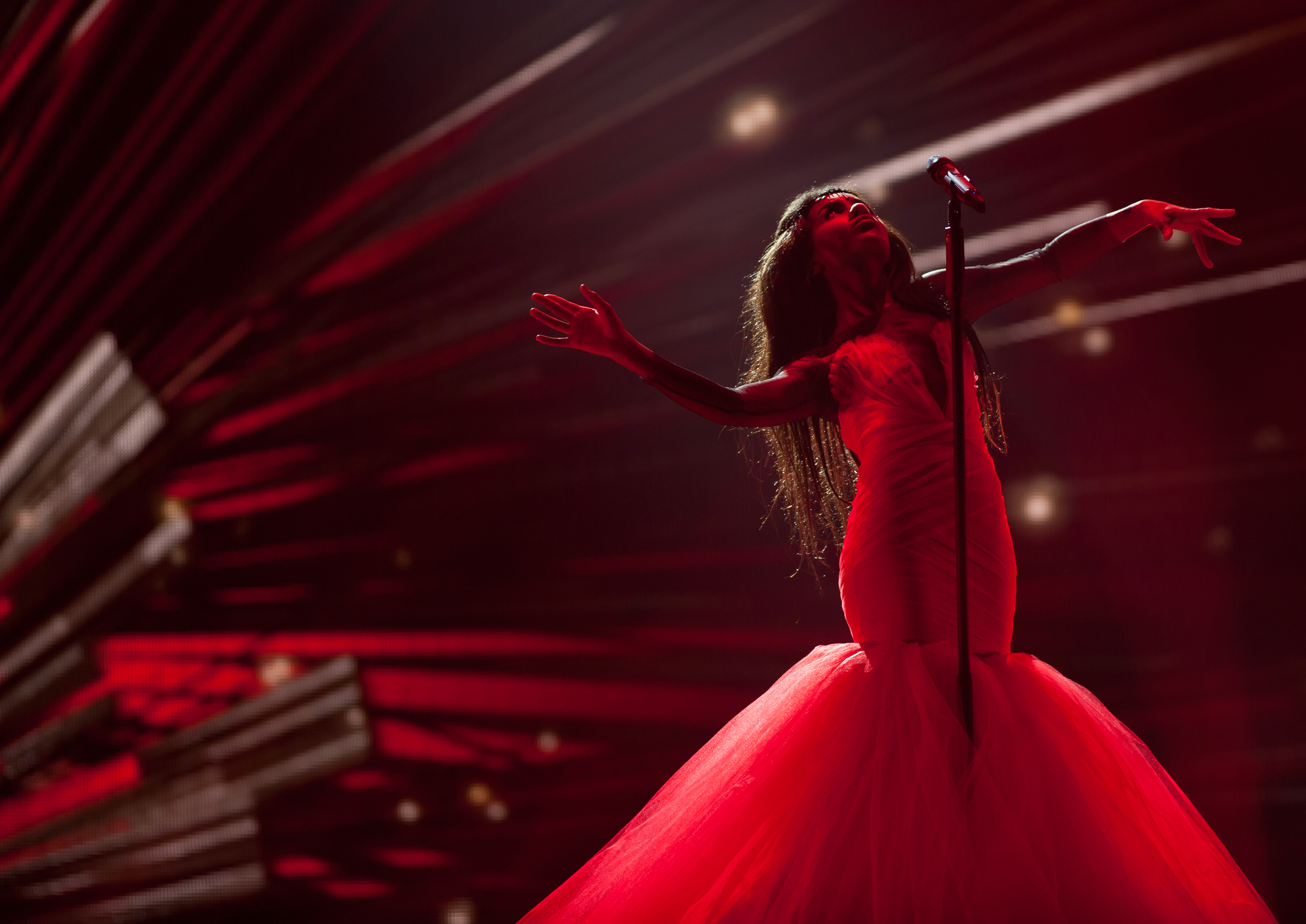
Aminata performing "Love Injected" in Vienna (2015)

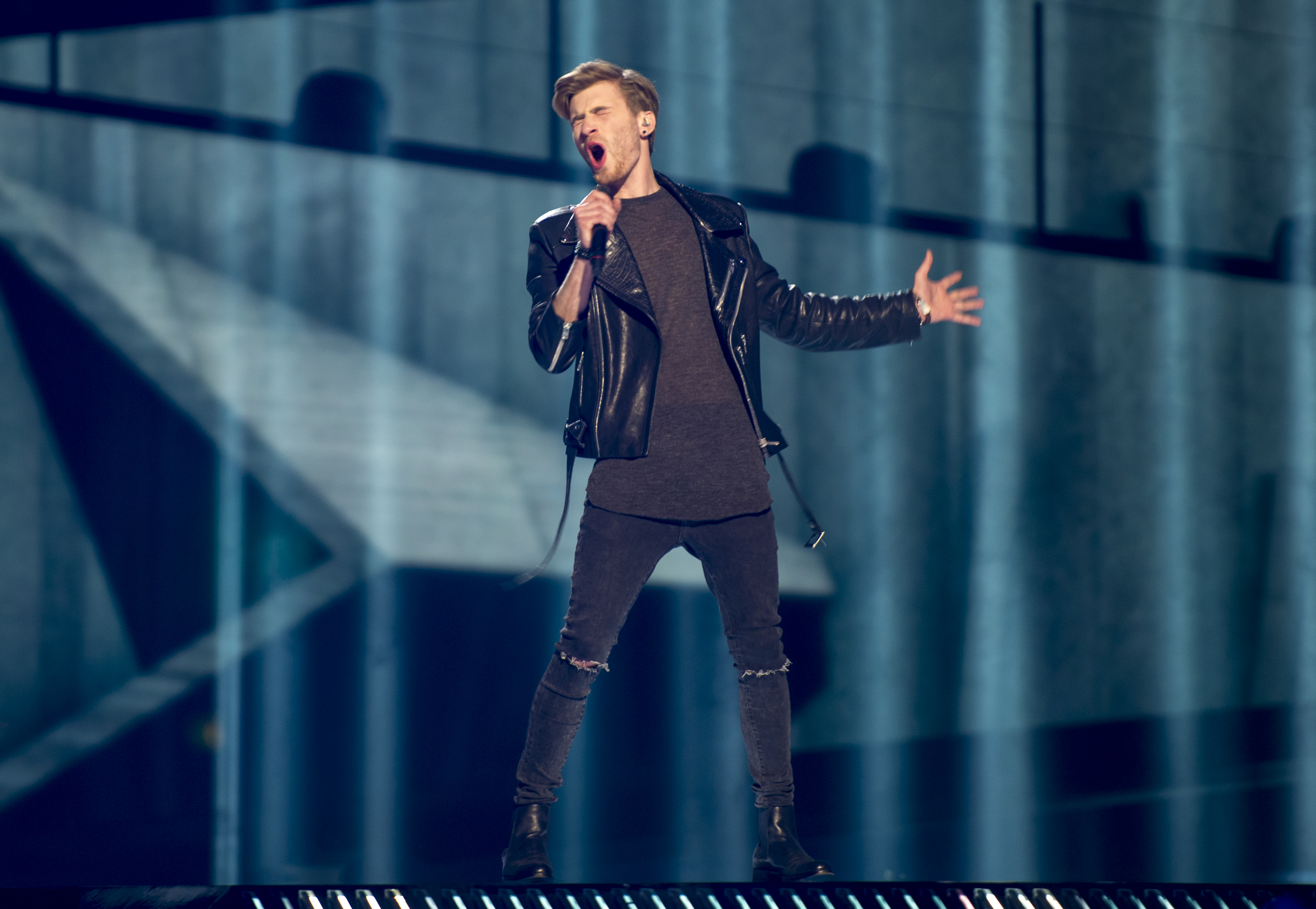
Justs performing "Heartbeat" in Stockholm (2016)

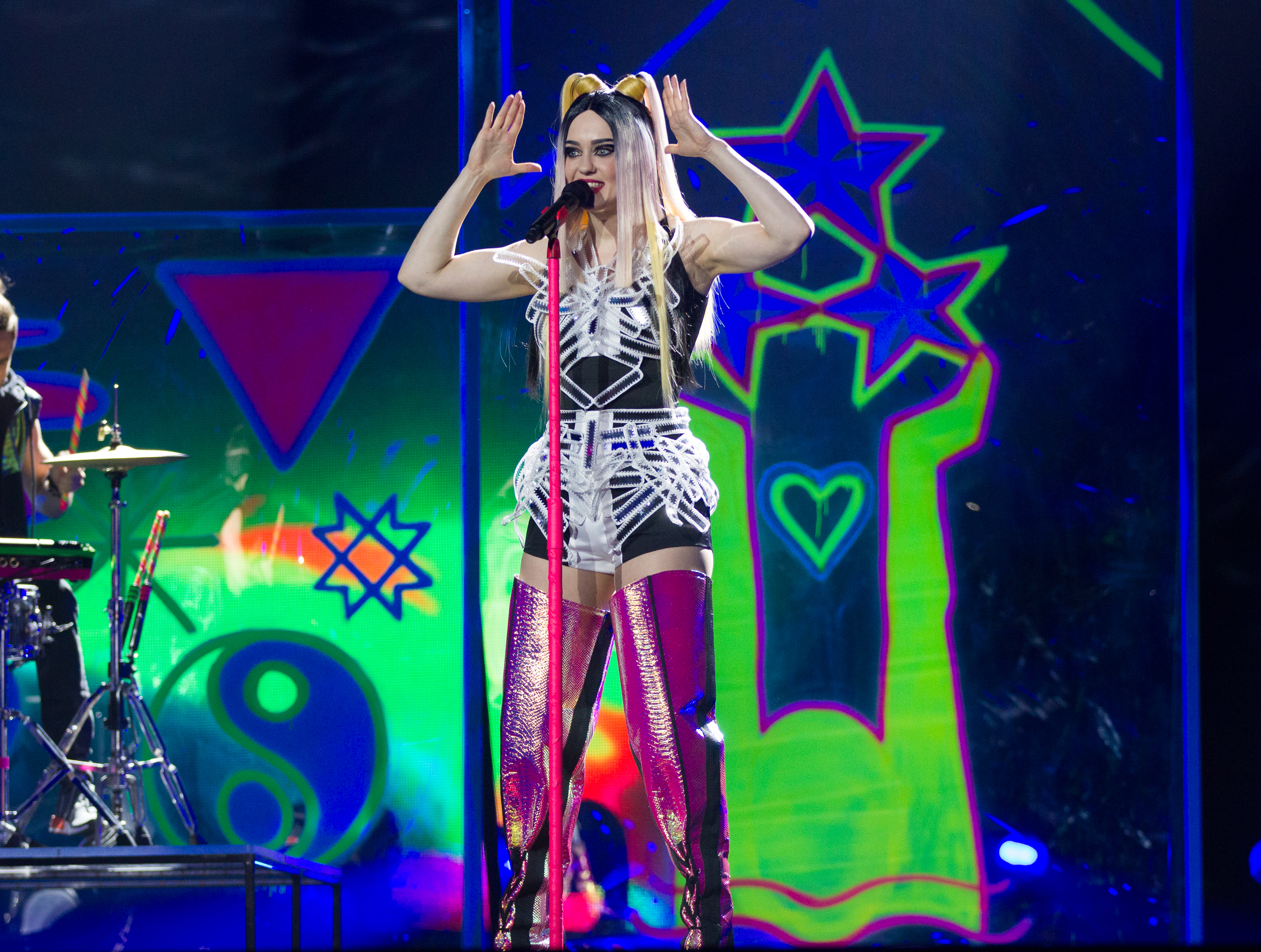
Triana Park performing "Line" in Kyiv (2017)

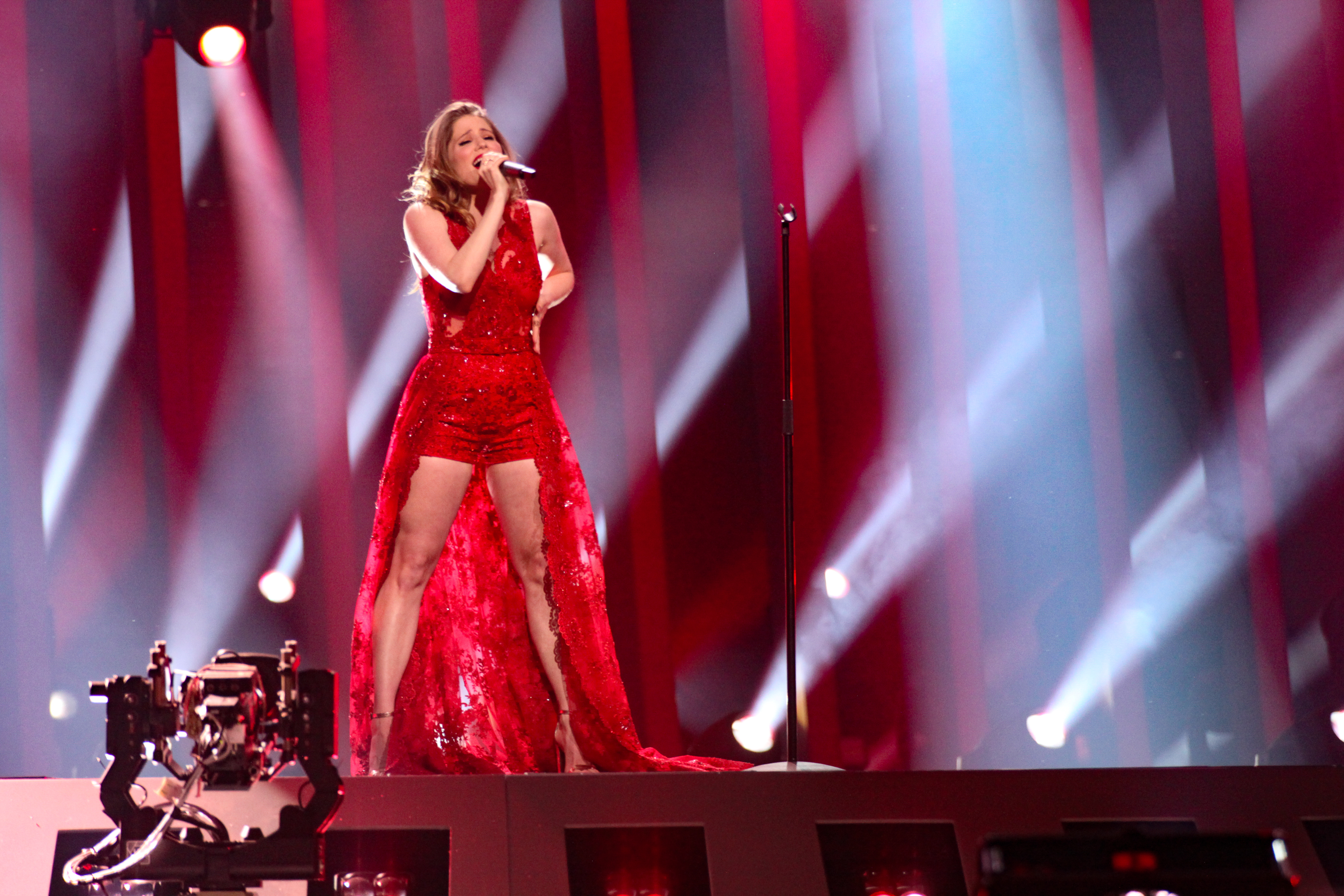
Laura Rizzotto performing "Funny Girl" in Lisbon (2018)

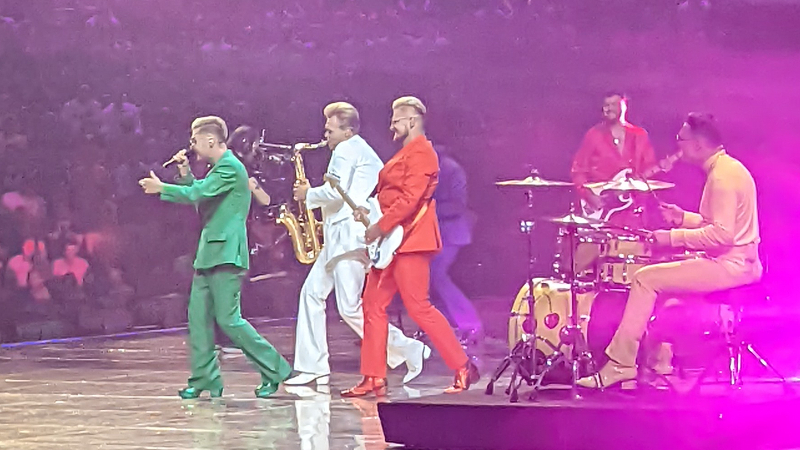
Citi Zēni performing "Eat Your Salad" in Turin (2022)

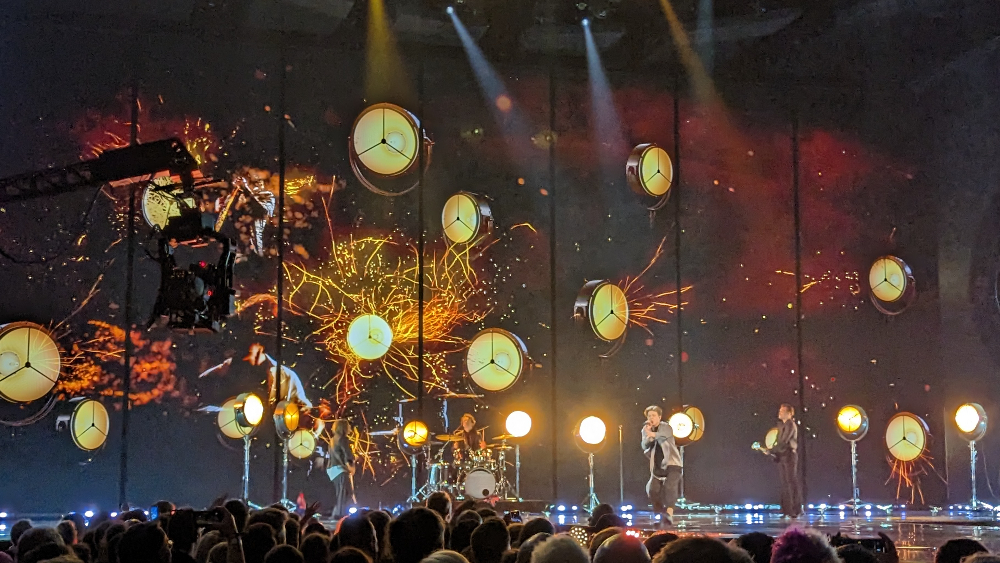
Sudden Lights performing "Aijā" in Liverpool (2023)

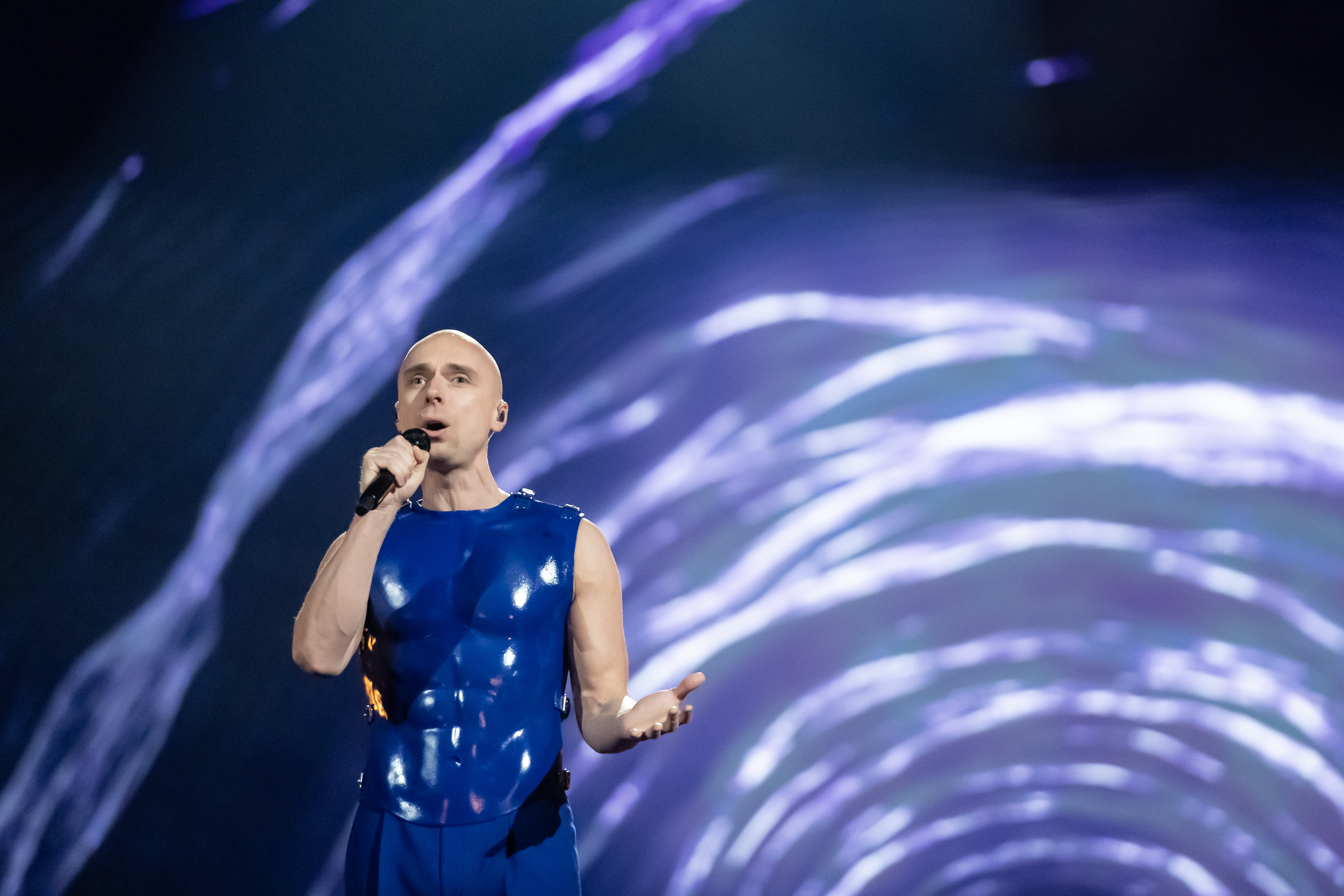
Dons performing "Hollow" in Malmö (2024)

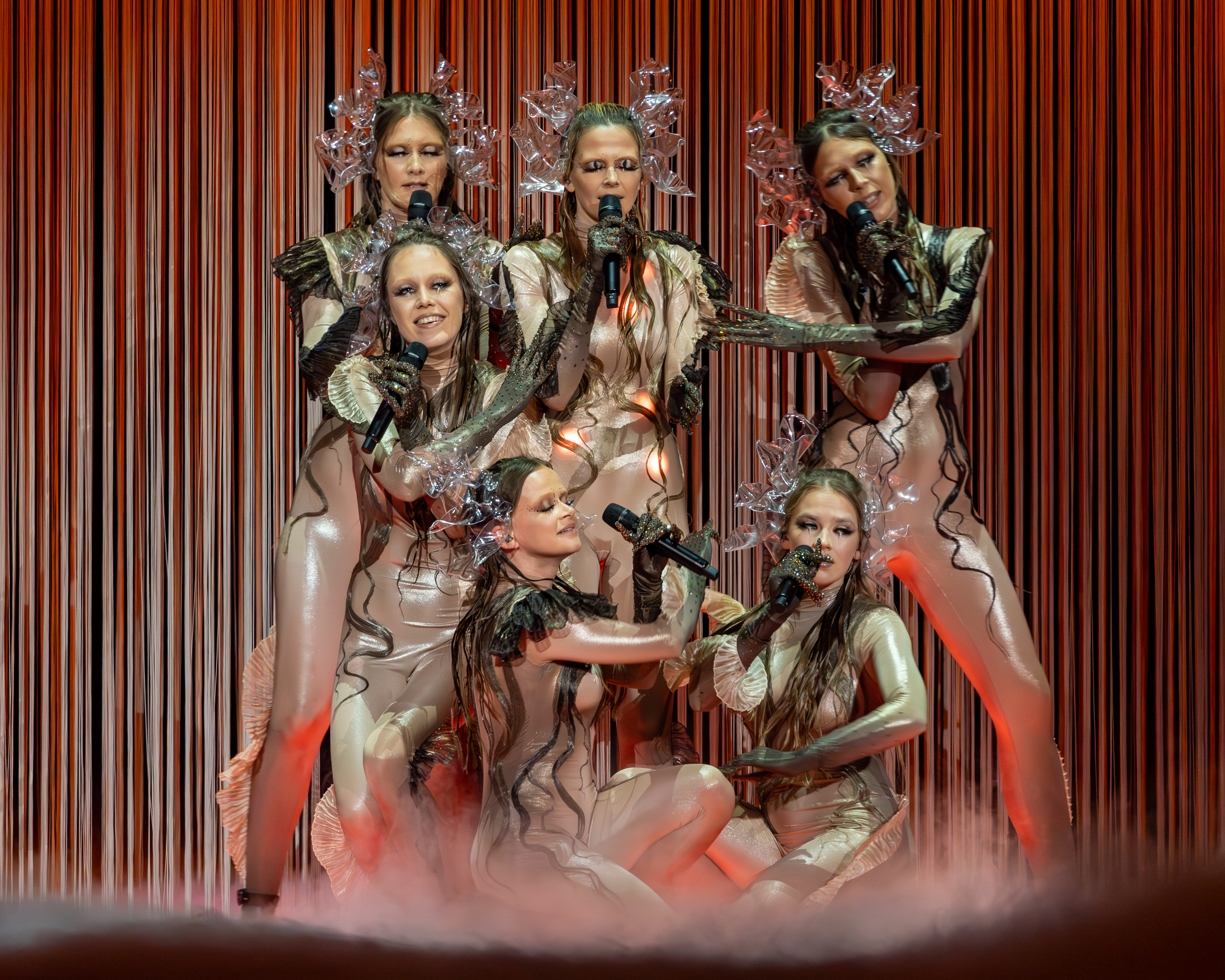
Tautumeitas performing "Bur man laimi" in Basel (2025)

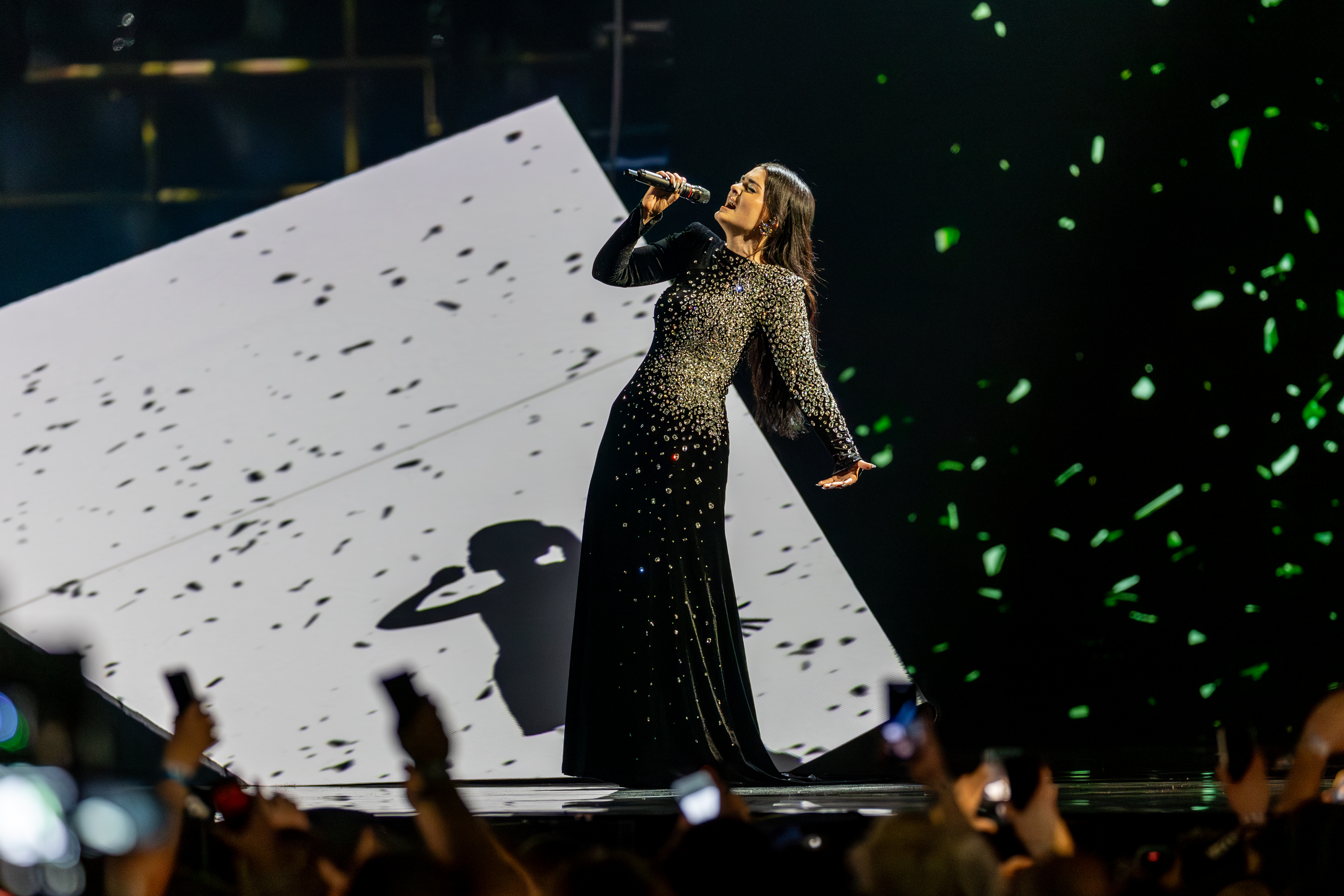
Atvara performing "Ēnā" in Vienna (2026)

== See also ==
- Latvia in the Junior Eurovision Song Contest – Junior version of the Eurovision Song Contest.
