= Anmary =

Latvian singer of Russian origin

- Born: Linda Amantova; 3 March 1980 (age 46); Gulbene, Latvia, Soviet Union
- Genres: Pop
- Occupation: Singer
- Instrument: Vocals
- Years active: 2003–present

Linda Dinsberga (née Amantova), known by her stage name Anmary, is a Latvian singer of Russian origin who won the Latvian national selection for the Eurovision Song Contest 2012 in Azerbaijan with the song "Beautiful Song".

== Biography ==
Amantova has graduated from the Jāzeps Vītols Latvian Academy of Music. She has participated in TV show "Talantu Fabrika 2", which she ended in second place.

Thereafter, she has taken part in a variety of musical projects, has performed in the musical West Side Story, and been the lead vocalist for the groups Sunny Sense and Mash Mash. Dr. Christoph Schönherr, composer and professor at the Hamburg College of Music and Theatre, chose Anmary to sing solo in his work Magnificat, which toured with the Hamburg Symphony Orchestra around Germany, Spain, France and Belgium. Anmary continued to develop her vocal skills while studying and today works as a vocal coach and singer.

In January 2013, she released her new single Sari Gelin. She made the clip in Azerbaijan, in Baku. She performed the song for the first time in an interview for the Eurovision Song Contest 2012.

Anmary was the spokesperson for Latvia at the Eurovision Song Contest 2013, presenting the points from the country.

On 12 June 2013 she married Aigars Dinsbergs and took his surname.

== Discography ==
=== Singles ===
- "Beautiful Song" (Eurovision Song Contest 2012 for Latvia)
- "Sari Gelin" (January 2013)

Awards and achievements
Preceded by Musiqq with "Angel in Disguise"	Latvia in the Eurovision Song Contest; 2012	Succeeded by PeR with "Here We Go"
