= Laura Bicāne =

Latvian singer

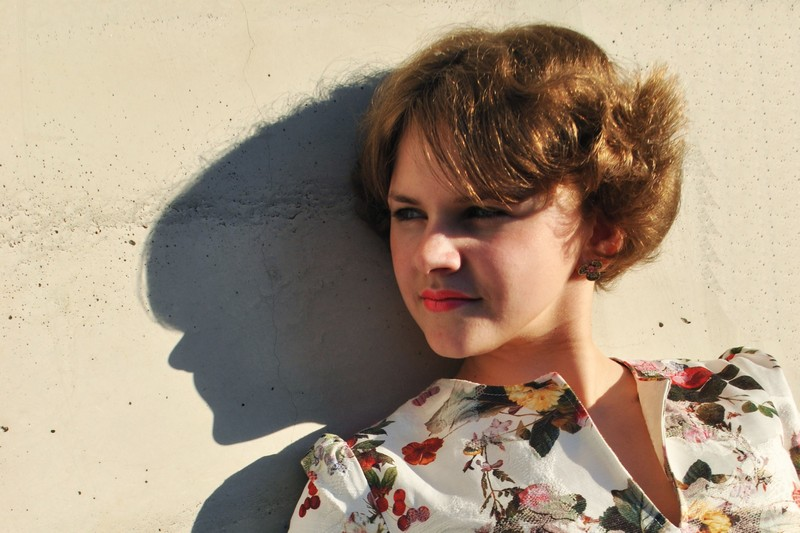

Background information
- Birth name: Laura Bicāne
- Born: 18 June 1990 (age 34); Daugavpils, Latvia
- Occupation(s): Musician, singer-songwriter
- Instrument(s): vocals, guitar, accordion
- Years active: 2007–present

Laura Bicāne (born 18 June 1990) is a Latvian singer and songwriter.

== Early life ==
Laura Bicāne studied at Špoģi music and art school where she learned how to play the accordion. Laura taught herself to play acoustic guitar. She performed her first composed songs at the Špoģi Secondary School for classmates. In 2017 she graduated from Daugavpils Staņislava Broka Music high school with qualification as a classical guitar player.

== Career ==
Since 2007, Bicāne has participated in music festivals in Latgale. Her first songs were recorded for the radio of Latgale. In 2010, she took second place in the German Live Act contest "Fehmarn sucht den Inselstar".

In 2012, she participated in Eirodziesma 2012 with her song "Freakin' Out". In the same year, Laura won the first prize at the A-Eiropa contest Hello Daugavpils.

In 2013, in cooperation with Latgalian positiv rock band Dabasu Durovys, she released her first album Es tikai ļaujūs, which included songs in different languages. In April 2015, Bicāne presented her second CD Trīspuksti. The CD was made in cooperation with musician Valdis Indrišonoks. All songs in the CD are written using the text of haiku. These haiku were written by Egita Terēze Jonāne.

In May 2017 she released her third album Lauzīsimies cauri pūlim with 10 compositions in Latvian, Latgalian, and English, along with one instrumental.

The songwriter is known among other Latvian songwriters who participate in the Latvian songwriter festival in Lielkrūzes and other festivāls. In 2014 and 2015 Laura participated in the festival BILDES for new songwriters.

In 2013, Bicāne played with another Latvian songwriter Kārlis Kazāks to represent Latvia in Lithuania at a singing poetry festival Tai - aš. She gave concerts in other countries — France, Germany, Belgium, and Lithuania.

She gave concerts organized by the Latgalian student center, by International Fellowship of Evangelical Students. She took part in Daugavpils city festivals, Saint Joseph festival in Līvbērze, in museum night activities in Liepāja and Lūznava, in the festival "Mīlestība nav mirusi" in Saldus, in Francophonie days activities, and in other live music festivals.

The songwriter is organizing private concerts in Latgale, in other cities of Latvia (including the biggest cities, such as Riga, Daugavpils, Liepāja and Ventspils).

The Latgalian culture prize Boņuks was given to Bicāne twice – in 2010 for her debut in literature and in 2012 for her debut in music.

Her most popular song is "Mīlesteiba". The lyrics are from the 1 Corinthians 1:13. The song was recorded during the Project Jauna slavas dziesma 2012.

== Discography ==
- 2013 Es tikai ļaujūs
- 2015 Trīspuksti
- 2017 Lauzīsimies cauri pūlim
- 2020 Ikdiena
