= PeR =

Latvian pop and beatboxing band

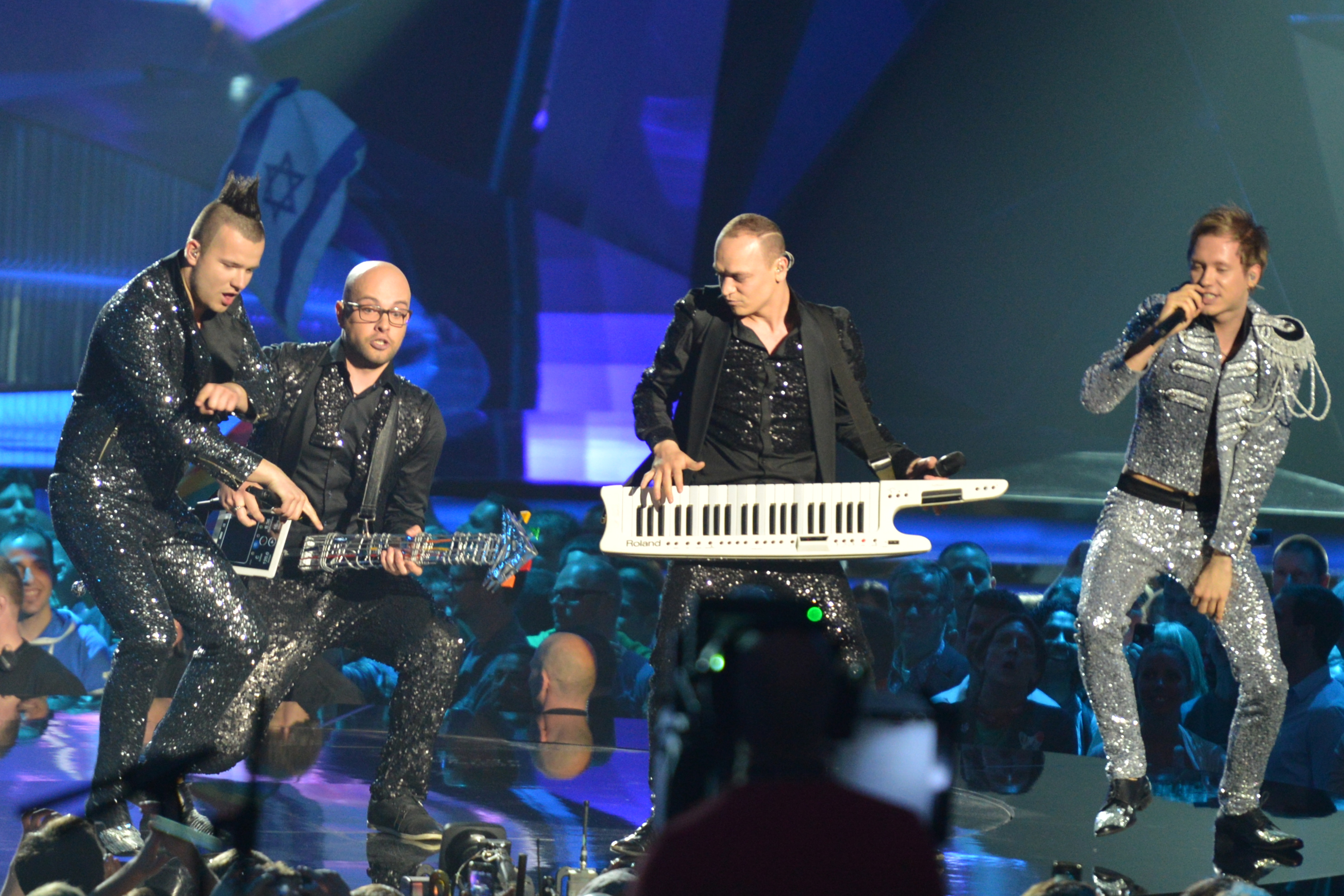
- PeR performing their song Here We Go in a dress rehearsal for the second semi final of the Eurovision Song Contest 2013.

Background information
- Origin: Latvia
- Genres: Pop music, beatboxing
- Years active: 2007–present
- Label: Platforma Music
- Members: Ralfs Eilands; Edmunds Rasmanis
- Past members: Emīls Vegners (2007–2008); Pēteris Upelnieks (2007–2011)

PeR (short for Please Explain the Rhythm) is a Latvian pop and beatboxing band formed in 2007. The original line-up was Ralfs Eilands, Emīls Vegners, and Pēteris Upelnieks. With Vegners leaving in 2007 and Upelnieks in 2011, the band became a duo consisting of Ralfs Eilands and Edmunds Rasmanis. PeR represented Latvia in the Eurovision Song Contest 2013 with the song "Here We Go".

== Background ==
=== Early years (2007–2008) ===
The band was founded in 2007, with original members Ralfs Eilands, Emīls Vegners, and Pēteris Upelnieks. On 21 July 2007, the band first appeared and performed on the Latvian music festival Dziesma manai paaudzei. After the festival, the band travelled to Moscow, Russia, to compete with other artists on the talent show Minuta Slavy (Minute of Fame), with the band coming in fourth place during voting. The band returned to Latvia, where they received an invitation to participate in the annual music event Bildes 2007. This was the last event with the original members.

In 2008, Emīls Vegners left the band and was replaced by Edmunds Rasmanis. The band gained popularity by appearing on the first series of LNT contest Latvijas zelta talanti, the group managed to reach the final, but failed to win. After the contest, the band performed at numerous events, including the 2009 edition of Muzikālā banka.

=== Unsuccessful Eirodziesma attempts (2009–2012) ===
In 2009, the band with Sabīne Berezine entered the 2009 edition of Eirodziesma the Latvian national selection for the Eurovision Song Contest 2009, with the song "Bye, Bye". The song qualified from the semi-final in sixth place, but finished ninth in the final.

The band returned to Eirodziesma in 2010, with the song "Like a Mouse", finishing in tenth and last place in the final.

In 2011, the band was reduced to two members when Pēteris Upelnieks left. They again participated in Eirodziesma in 2012, with "Disco Superfly", qualifying from the semi-final and finishing fifth in the final.

=== Dziesma and Eurovision Song Contest (2013–) ===
The band entered two songs for Dziesma 2013, "Sad Trumpet" was entered into the first semi-final, and "Here We Go" into the second semi-final. Both songs qualified from their semi-finals to the final. "Sad Trumpet" and "Here We Go" were drawn forth and twelfth respectively in the final running order, during voting "Here We Go" qualified for the super-final with two other songs. At the close of voting "Here We Go" had received the most votes and won the contest, and thus represented Latvia at the Eurovision Song Contest 2013 in Malmö, Sweden.

== Discography ==
=== Albums ===
- 2012 – PeR

=== Singles ===
- 2009 – "Bye, Bye"
- 2009 – "Bums"
- 2010 – "Like a Mouse"
- 2010 – "Līdzsvarā"
- 2011 – "Go Get Up"
- 2011 – "Mazajām Sirsniņām"
- 2012 – "Disco Superfly"
- 2013 – "Sad Trumpet"
- 2013 – "Here We Go"

Awards and achievements
| Preceded by Anmary with "Beautiful Song" | Latvia in the Eurovision Song Contest; 2013 | Succeeded by Aarzemnieki with "Cake to Bake" |
