= Latvia in the Eurovision Song Contest 2011 =

- Eurovision Song Contest 2011
- Participating broadcaster: Latvijas Televīzija (LTV)
- Country: Latvia
- Selection process: Eirodziesma 2011
- Selection date: 26 February 2011

Competing entry
- Song: "Angel in Disguise"
- Artist: Musiqq
- Songwriters: Marats Ogļezņevs

Placement
- Semi-final result: Failed to qualify (17th)

Participation chronology

Latvia was represented at the Eurovision Song Contest 2011 with the song "Angel in Disguise" written by Marats Ogļezņevs, and performed by the duo Musiqq. The Latvian participating broadcaster, Latvijas Televīzija (LTV), organised the national final Eirodziesma 2011 in order to select its entry for the contest. Twenty songs were selected to compete in the national final, which consisted of four shows: two heats, one Second Chance round and a final. In the heats, five entries were selected to advance from each show: three entries selected based on a public televote and two entries selected by a seven-member jury panel. In the Second Chance round, two entries were selected to advance: one selected based on a public vote and one selected by the jury. Twelve songs ultimately qualified to compete in the final on 26 February 2011 where two rounds of voting by the public and jury selected "Angel in Disguise" performed by Musiqq as the winner.

Latvia was drawn to compete in the second semi-final of the Eurovision Song Contest which took place on 12 May 2011. Performing during the show in position 17, "Angel in Disguise" was not announced among the top 10 entries of the second semi-final and therefore did not qualify to compete in the final. It was later revealed that Latvia placed seventeenth out of the 19 participating countries in the semi-final with 25 points.

== Background ==
Prior to the 2011 contest, Latvijas Televīzija (LTV) had participated in the Eurovision Song Contest representing Latvia eleven times since its first entry in 2000. Latvia won the contest once in 2002 with the song "I Wanna" performed by Marie N. Following the introduction of semi-finals for the 2004, Latvia was able to qualify to compete in the final between 2005 and 2008. In 2009 and 2010, the nation had failed to qualify to the final for two consecutive years including with their 2010 entry "What For?" performed by Aisha.

As part of its duties as participating broadcaster, LTV organises the selection of its entry in the Eurovision Song Contest and broadcasts the event in the country. The broadcaster confirmed its intentions to participate at the 2011 contest on 16 November 2010. LTV has selected its entries for the Eurovision Song Contest through a national final. Since their debut in 2000, it had organised the selection show Eirodziesma. Along with its participation confirmation, the broadcaster announced that it would organise Eirodziesma 2011 in order to select its entry for the 2011 contest.

== Before Eurovision ==
=== Eirodziesma 2011 ===
Eirodziesma 2011 was the twelfth edition of Eirodziesma, the music competition that selects Latvia's entries for the Eurovision Song Contest. The competition commenced on 5 February 2011 and concluded with a final on 26 February 2011. All shows in the competition took place at the Jūras vārti Theatre in Ventspils and broadcast on LTV1 as well as online via the broadcaster's official website ltv.lv. The final was also streamed online at the official Eurovision Song Contest website eurovision.tv.

==== Format ====
The format of the competition consisted of four shows: two semi-finals, a Second Chance round and a final. The two semi-finals, held on 5 and 12 February 2011, each featured ten competing entries from which five advanced directly to the final from each show. The Second Chance round, held on 19 February 2011, featured the ten non-qualifiers from the semi-finals from which two proceeded to the final. The final, held on 26 February 2011, selected the Latvian entry for Düsseldorf from the remaining twelve entries over two rounds of voting: the first round selected the top three songs and the second round (superfinal) selected the winner.

Results during the semi-final, Second Chance and final shows were determined by a jury panel and votes from the public. The songs first faced a public vote where the top three entries qualified. The jury then selected an additional two qualifiers from the remaining entries to proceed in the competition. In the final, results were determined by the 50/50 combination of votes from the jury and public. Both the jury and public vote assigned points from 1 to 12 based on ranking in the first round of the final, with the first place receiving one point and last place receiving twelve points. In the superfinal, the jury and public both assigned points from 1 to 3 also based on ranking with the first place receiving one point and last place receiving three points. Ties were decided in favour of the entries that received higher points from the public. Viewers were able to vote via telephone up to five times or via SMS with a single SMS counting as five votes.

The jury voted in each show and selected entries to advance in the competition. The panel consisted of:

- Boriss Rezņiks – composer
- Sandra Veinberga – journalist
- Jānis Šipkēvics – Head of Radio SWH
- Iveta Lepeško – Head of Delegation for Latvia at the Eurovision Song Contest
- Aigars Dinsbergs – director of the Musical Theater 7
- Juris Sējāns – musician, producer and composer
- Aivars Hermanis – composer, arranger and producer

==== Competing entries ====
Artists and songwriters with Latvian citizenship or residency were able to submit their entries to the broadcaster between 16 November 2010 and 7 December 2010. 71 entries (7 less than the previous year) were submitted at the conclusion of the submission period. A jury panel appointed by LTV evaluated the submitted songs and selected twenty entries for the competition. The jury panel consisted of Boriss Rezņiks (composer), Jānis Zvirgzdiņš (composer and producer), Ance Krauze (singer and vocal teacher), Vineta Elksne (singer, vocal coach, conductor and songwriter), Aigars Dinsbergs (director of the Musical Theater 7), Valdis Skujiņš (producer), Artis Dvarionas (musician and producer at Radio SWH) and members of the LTV working group: Māris Martinsons, Sanita Auškāpa, Zita Kaminska, Jana Priedniece and Arvīds Babris. The twenty competing artists and songs were announced during a press conference on 14 December 2010. Among the artists were Lauris Reiniks who represented Latvia in the Eurovision Song Contest 2003 as part of the group F.L.Y. and Kaspars Tīmanis who represented Latvia in the Eurovision Song Contest 2007 as part of the group Bonaparti.lv.

| Artist | Song | Songwriter(s) |
|---|---|---|
| Blitze | "Hop" | Mārtiņš Freimanis |
| Candy | "Love Is Like an Aeroplane" | Gints Stankevičs, Guntars Račs |
| Crazy Dolls | "Positively Thinking" | Aldis Zaļūksnis, Mārtiņš Poļakovskis |
| D-family | "Daylight" | Andris Freidenfelds, Ģirts Lūsis, Normunds Jakušonoks, Valdis Čirksts |
| Dace Upīte | "Magnet" | Kārlis Būmeisters, Dace Upīte |
| Dace Upīte and Nikolajs Puzikovs | "It's Not Easy" | Māris Elksnis, Līga Markova, Dace Upīte |
| Elīna Krastiņa-Grence | "Look Back at Me Again" | Elīna Krastiņa-Grence |
| Evija Sloka | "Don't Stop the Dance" | Māris Sloka, Artūrs Palkevičs, Guntars Račs |
| Ģirts Zebuliņš and Flame | "Rough Enough" | Andris Barons, Atis Zviedris |
| Ineta Rudzīte and Uldis Timma | "Walking on My Tiptoes" | Andris Riekstiņš, Krišs Riekstiņš |
| Ivo Grīsniņš-Grīslis | "Cinderella" | Ingars Viļums |
| Jānis Stībelis | "Let It Be Me" | Jānis Stībelis |
| Juris Ludženieks | "Beautiful World" | Juris Ludženieks |
| Lauris Reiniks | "Banjo Laura" | Lauris Reiniks |
| Musiqq | "Angel in Disguise" | Marats Ogļezņevs |
| Oksana Ļepska | "Live On!" | Oksana Ļepska, Oļegs Borošņevs |
| Pieneņu vīns | "You Are" | Jurijs Koškins, Evelina Protektore |
| Sabīne Berezina | "Let Me Be" | Ingars Viļums |
| The Secretz | "Summer Night" | Edgars Viļums, Santa Dzalbe |
| Triānas parks | "Upside Down" | Agnese Rakovska |

==== Semi-finals ====
The two semi-finals took place on 5 and 12 February 2011, hosted by Uģis Joksts and Valters Frīdenbergs. In each semi-final ten acts competed and five entries qualified directly to the final. The competing entries first faced a public vote where the top three songs advanced; an additional two qualifiers were then selected from the remaining eight entries by the jury. The remaining five entries advanced to the Second Chance round.

Public vote qualifier Jury qualifier

Semi-final 1 – 5 February 2011
| R/O | Artist | Song | Jury | Televote | | Result |
| R/O | Artist | Song | Jury | Votes | Rank | Result |
|---|---|---|---|---|---|---|
| 1 | Blitze | "Hop" | 8 | 2,275 | 1 | Final |
| 2 | Dace Upīte and Nikolajs Puzikovs | "It's Not Easy" | 6 | 801 | 6 | Second Chance |
| 3 | D-family | "Daylight" | 2 | 933 | 5 | Final |
| 4 | Ineta Rudzīte and Uldis Timma | "Walking on My Tiptoes" | 7 | 345 | 8 | Second Chance |
| 5 | Sabīne Berezina | "Let Me Be" | 10 | 233 | 10 | Second Chance |
| 6 | Pieneņu vīns | "You Are" | 5 | 1,376 | 3 | Final |
| 7 | Evija Sloka | "Don't Stop the Dance" | 3 | 1,698 | 2 | Final |
| 8 | Jānis Stībelis | "Let It Be Me" | 1 | 698 | 7 | Final |
| 9 | Ģirts Zebuliņš and Flame | "Rough Enough" | 9 | 288 | 9 | Second Chance |
| 10 | Candy | "Love Is Like an Aeroplane" | 4 | 986 | 4 | Second Chance |

Semi-final 2 – 12 February 2011
| R/O | Artist | Song | Jury | Televote | | Result |
| R/O | Artist | Song | Jury | Votes | Rank | Result |
|---|---|---|---|---|---|---|
| 1 | Ivo Grīsniņš-Grīslis | "Cinderella" | 6 | 338 | 10 | Second Chance |
| 2 | Triānas parks | "Upside Down" | 2 | 892 | 4 | Final |
| 3 | Oksana Ļepska | "Live On!" | 4 | 879 | 5 | Final |
| 4 | Elīna Krastiņa-Grence | "Look Back at Me Again" | 9 | 788 | 6 | Second Chance |
| 5 | Musiqq | "Angel in Disguise" | 1 | 1,886 | 2 | Final |
| 6 | Juris Ludženieks | "Beautiful World" | 10 | 403 | 9 | Second Chance |
| 7 | Crazy Dolls | "Positively Thinking" | 5 | 530 | 7 | Second Chance |
| 8 | The Secretz | "Summer Night" | 8 | 901 | 3 | Final |
| 9 | Lauris Reiniks | "Banjo Laura" | 3 | 2,247 | 1 | Final |
| 10 | Dace Upīte | "Magnet" | 7 | 474 | 8 | Second Chance |

==== Second Chance ====
The Second Chance round took place on 19 February 2011, hosted by Uģis Joksts and Valters Frīdenbergs. The ten entries that failed to qualify from the semi-finals competed and two qualified to the final. The entries first faced a public vote where song with the highest number of votes from the public advanced. An additional qualifier was selected from the remaining nine entries by the jury.

Public vote qualifier Jury qualifier

Second Chance – 19 February 2011
| R/O | Artist | Song | Jury | Televote | | Result |
| R/O | Artist | Song | Jury | Votes | Rank | Result |
|---|---|---|---|---|---|---|
| 1 | Dace Upīte | "Magnet" | 7 | 81 | 9 | —N/a |
| 2 | Candy | "Love Is Like an Aeroplane" | 2 | 791 | 2 | —N/a |
| 3 | Crazy Dolls | "Positively Thinking" | 3 | 440 | 3 | —N/a |
| 4 | Ģirts Zebuliņš and Flame | "Rough Enough" | 8 | 49 | 10 | —N/a |
| 5 | Juris Ludženieks | "Beautiful World" | 6 | 135 | 6 | —N/a |
| 6 | Sabīne Berezina | "Let Me Be" | 9 | 100 | 8 | —N/a |
| 7 | Elīna Krastiņa-Grence | "Look Back at Me Again" | 10 | 1,311 | 1 | Final |
| 8 | Ineta Rudzīte and Uldis Timma | "Walking on My Tiptoes" | 5 | 119 | 7 | —N/a |
| 9 | Ivo Grīsniņš-Grīslis | "Cinderella" | 1 | 247 | 5 | Final |
| 10 | Dace Upīte and Nikolajs Puzikovs | "It's Not Easy" | 4 | 373 | 4 | —N/a |

==== Final ====
The final took place on 26 February 2011, hosted by Uģis Joksts, Valters Frīdenbergs and Jolanta Strikaite. Prior to the final, Triānas parks withdrew their song "Upside Down" from the competition due to illness of the group's lead singer. The remaining eleven entries that qualified from the preceding two semi-finals and Second Chance round competed and the winner was selected over two rounds of voting. In the first round, three songs advanced to the second round, the superfinal, based on the combination of votes from a jury panel and a public vote. In the superfinal, "Angel in Disguise" performed by Musiqq was declared the winner through the combination of votes from the jury and public.

Final – 26 February 2011
| R/O | Artist | Song | Jury | Televote | | Total | Place |
| R/O | Artist | Song | Jury | Votes | Points | Total | Place |
|---|---|---|---|---|---|---|---|
| 1 | Evija Sloka | "Don't Stop the Dance" | 6 | 1,608 | 5 | 11 | 4 |
| 2 | Elīna Krastiņa-Grence | "Look Back at Me Again" | 10 | 878 | 7 | 17 | 8 |
| 3 | Ivo Grīsniņš-Grīslis | "Cinderella" | 7 | 389 | 10 | 17 | 10 |
| 4 | Triānas parks | "Upside Down" | — | — | — | — | — |
| 5 | The Secretz | "Summer Night" | 11 | 334 | 11 | 22 | 11 |
| 6 | Pieneņu vīns | "You Are" | 4 | 2,413 | 3 | 7 | 3 |
| 7 | Jānis Stībelis | "Let It Be Me" | 3 | 830 | 8 | 11 | 6 |
| 8 | Oksana Ļepska | "Live On!" | 8 | 744 | 9 | 17 | 9 |
| 9 | Musiqq | "Angel in Disguise" | 1 | 5,942 | 2 | 3 | 2 |
| 10 | Blitze | "Hop" | 9 | 1,783 | 4 | 13 | 7 |
| 11 | D-family | "Daylight" | 5 | 1,223 | 6 | 11 | 5 |
| 12 | Lauris Reiniks | "Banjo Laura" | 2 | 5,988 | 1 | 3 | 1 |

Superfinal – 26 February 2011
| R/O | Artist | Song | Jury | Televote | | Total | Place |
| R/O | Artist | Song | Jury | Votes | Points | Total | Place |
|---|---|---|---|---|---|---|---|
| 1 | Lauris Reiniks | "Banjo Laura" | 2 | 8,495 | 2 | 4 | 2 |
| 2 | Pieneņu vīns | "You Are" | 3 | 3,035 | 3 | 6 | 3 |
| 3 | Musiqq | "Angel in Disguise" | 1 | 12,539 | 1 | 2 | 1 |

=== Promotion ===
Musiqq promoted "Angel in Disguise" as the Latvian Eurovision entry on 14 April 2011 by performing during the Eurovision in Concert event which was held at the Club Air venue in Amsterdam, Netherlands and hosted by Cornald Maas, Esther Hart and Sascha Korf.

== At Eurovision ==
All countries except the "Big Five" (France, Germany, Italy, Spain and the United Kingdom), and the host country, are required to qualify from one of two semi-finals in order to compete for the final; the top ten countries from each semi-final progress to the final. The European Broadcasting Union (EBU) split up the competing countries into six different pots based on voting patterns from previous contests, with countries with favourable voting histories put into the same pot. On 17 January 2011, a special allocation draw was held which placed each country into one of the two semi-finals, as well as which half of the show they would perform in. Latvia was placed into the second semi-final, to be held on 12 May 2011, and was scheduled to perform in the second half of the show. The running order for the semi-finals was decided through another draw on 15 March 2011 and Latvia was set to perform in position 17, following the entry from Belarus and before the entry from Denmark.

The two semi-finals and the final were broadcast in Latvia on LTV1 with all shows featuring commentary by Valters Frīdenbergs and Uģis Joksts. The Latvian spokesperson, who announced the Latvian votes during the final, was Aisha.

=== Semi-final ===
Musiqq took part in technical rehearsals on 14 and 16 May, followed by dress rehearsals on 20 and 21 May. This included the jury show on 14 May where the professional juries of each country watched and voted on the competing entries.

The Latvian performance featured the two members of Musiqq dressed in black with a red dickie bow. Emīls Balceris also wore a white waistcoat while Marats Ogļezņevs also wore a black waistcoat with white borders and a hat. The performance began with the duo seated with their backs to the audience before turning around and facing the audience and ultimately emerging from their seats. The LED screens displayed flashing strips of light against a dark backdrop. Musiqq was joined on stage by four backing vocalists: Gatis Supe, Kristaps Šēnbergs, Lība Ēce-Kalniņa and Rūta Dūduma-Ķirse.

At the end of the show, Latvia was not announced among the top 10 entries in the second semi-final and therefore failed to qualify to compete in the final. It was later revealed that Latvia placed seventeenth in the semi-final, receiving a total of 25 points.

=== Voting ===
Voting during the three shows consisted of 50 percent public televoting and 50 percent from a jury deliberation. The jury consisted of five music industry professionals who were citizens of the country they represent, with their names published before the contest to ensure transparency. This jury was asked to judge each contestant based on: vocal capacity; the stage performance; the song's composition and originality; and the overall impression by the act. In addition, no member of a national jury could be related in any way to any of the competing acts in such a way that they cannot vote impartially and independently. The individual rankings of each jury member were released shortly after the grand final.

Following the release of the full split voting by the EBU after the conclusion of the competition, it was revealed that Latvia had placed fifteenth with the public televote and nineteenth (last) with the jury vote in the first semi-final. In the public vote, Latvia scored 43 points, while with the jury vote, Latvia scored 11 points.

Below is a breakdown of points awarded to Latvia and awarded by Latvia in the first semi-final and grand final of the contest. The nation awarded its 12 points to Denmark in the semi-final and to Italy in the final of the contest.

==== Points awarded to Latvia ====
Points awarded to Latvia (Semi-final 2)
| Score | Country |
|---|---|
| 12 points | |
| 10 points | |
| 8 points | Estonia |
| 7 points | Ireland |
| 6 points | |
| 5 points | |
| 4 points | Austria |
| 3 points | |
| 2 points | Belarus; Denmark; Sweden |
| 1 point | |

==== Points awarded by Latvia ====
Points awarded by Latvia (Semi-final 2)
| Score | Country |
|---|---|
| 12 points | Denmark |
| 10 points | Ireland |
| 8 points | Estonia |
| 7 points | Sweden |
| 6 points | Belarus |
| 5 points | Romania |
| 4 points | Slovenia |
| 3 points | Belgium |
| 2 points | Bosnia and Herzegovina |
| 1 point | Moldova |

Points awarded by Latvia (Final)
| Score | Country |
|---|---|
| 12 points | Italy |
| 10 points | Ireland |
| 8 points | Germany |
| 7 points | Lithuania |
| 6 points | Denmark |
| 5 points | United Kingdom |
| 4 points | Estonia |
| 3 points | Slovenia |
| 2 points | Azerbaijan |
| 1 point | France |
