= Musiqq =

Latvian musical duo

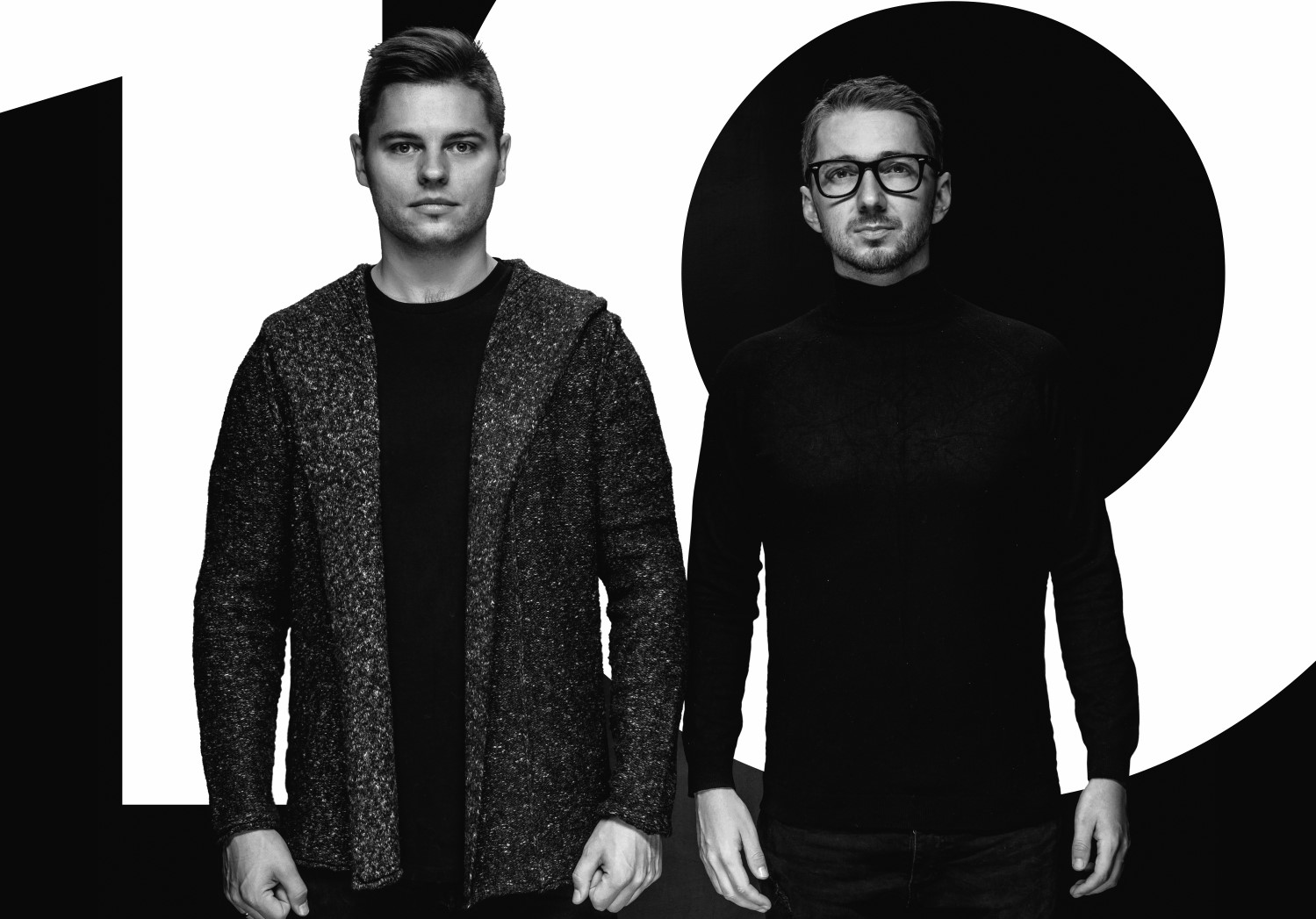
- Musiqq in 2018

Background information
- Origin: Liepāja, Latvia
- Genres: Pop, R&B
- Years active: 2009–present
- Label: Microphone Records
- Members: Marats Ogļezņevs; Emīls Balceris

Musiqq is a Latvian pop and R&B duo formed in Liepāja in 2009. It consists of musicians Marats Ogļezņevs and Emīls Balceris. The duo gained recognition with the singles "Klimata kontrole" and "Abrakadabra", the latter of which won the 2009 edition of the Latvian music competition Muzikālā banka. Their debut studio album, Šī ir tikai mūzika, was released in March 2010.

Musiqq represented Latvia at the Eurovision Song Contest 2011 in Düsseldorf, Germany, with the song "Angel in Disguise". They finished 17th in the second semi-final and did not qualify for the final.

The two musicians also perform as the Latvian hip-hop duo Bermudu Divstūris, a project established in 2011.

== History ==
=== Formation and debut album (2009–2010) ===
Musiqq was formed in 2009 by Marats Ogļezņevs, formerly a member of the Latvian group Device, and singer Emīls Balceris. Balceris had previously appeared on the television talent competition Latvijas talants in 2007 and on Koru kari, a televised choir competition, in which he performed as part of the Liepāja choir.

Ogļezņevs became interested in collaborating with Balceris after seeing him perform on television. The musicians began working together and recorded four songs during their first meeting.

The duo released their first single, "Klimata kontrole", on 12 June 2009, followed by "Abrakadabra" on 1 October. The latter received substantial radio airplay in Latvia and won SEB Muzikālā banka 2009, an annual music poll organised by Latvian Radio 2. The award ceremony took place on 23 January 2010 in Ventspils.

Their debut studio album, Šī ir tikai mūzika (This Is Just Music), was released on 25 March 2010 through Microphone Records. It contained 12 tracks, including "Klimata kontrole", "Abrakadabra" and "Dzimšanas diena". Ogļezņevs wrote and produced the songs, working with producer Jānis Kalve on the recording.

=== Eurovision Song Contest (2011) ===
In February 2011, Musiqq competed in Eirodziesma 2011, Latvia's national selection for the Eurovision Song Contest, with "Angel in Disguise". They won the national final on 26 February, earning the right to represent Latvia at the international competition in Düsseldorf.

The national selection comprised two heats, a second-chance round and a final with 11 acts. Musiqq performed eighth in the final and advanced to a three-act superfinal, where the results were determined by an equal combination of jury and public votes.

The duo performed in the second semi-final on 12 May 2011. Their entry received 25 points and placed 17th out of 19 participating countries, failing to advance to the final.

Later in 2011, Ogļezņevs and Balceris established a separate hip-hop project named Bermudu Divstūris. The project featured a different musical style and public image from their work as Musiqq.

=== Second album and acoustic recordings (2014–2015) ===
Musiqq released their second studio album, Vēl viena mūzika (Another Music), on 16 November 2014, coinciding with the fifth anniversary of the duo's formation. The album contained 11 tracks, including previously released singles and the Eurovision entry "Angel in Disguise". Ogļezņevs continued to oversee songwriting and production, while Jānis Kalve contributed to the recording process.

The album was promoted with a concert at the Palladium concert hall in Riga on 16 November 2014. Its singles included "Sekundes", which had been released ahead of the album in October.

At the 2015 Zelta mikrofons ceremony, the musicians received recognition for both projects. Musiqq's "Sekundes" won the audience-voted Alfa award, while Bermudu Divstūris won Best Hip-Hop or Dance Music Album for Ballējam neguļam.

In October 2015, the duo released Silta sirds (Warm Heart), their first acoustic album. The recording featured contributions from guitarist Uldis Beitiņš, percussionist Viktors Veselovs, saxophonist Alex and the musical groups DaGamba and DoReMi.

The album was followed by the duo's first acoustic concert tour, which included performances in Valmiera, Riga, Rēzekne, Liepāja and Jelgava between November and December 2015. The accompanying musicians included Beitiņš, bassist Roberts Rasa, keyboardist and guitarist Edgars Jass, Veselovs, saxophonist Alex and backing vocalist Rūta Dūduma.

=== Tenth anniversary and collaborations (2016–2019) ===
In 2016, Musiqq collaborated with Latvian rock band Brainstorm (Prāta Vētra) on the song "Debesis iekrita tevī". The song won the 2016 edition of Muzikālā banka, with the final held in January 2017.

At the 2017 Zelta mikrofons (Golden Microphone) awards, the collaboration received three awards: Best Song, Radio Hit and the audience-voted Alfa Song of the Year.

In April 2019, Musiqq released 10, a studio album marking their tenth anniversary. It featured ten songs, including "Biļete tikai uz priekšu" and "Salas". On 27 April, the duo held an anniversary concert at Arena Riga, performing songs from their previous albums alongside material from the new release.

=== Later releases (2023–2026) ===
On 17 January 2023, Musiqq released Bijis, ir un būs, a seven-track mini-album inspired by songs by the Latvian rock band Līvi. The release incorporated musical elements from Līvi's repertoire into new arrangements and was accompanied by a series of concerts.

The duo released Mākslas darbs (Work of Art) on 17 June 2024, marking their 15th anniversary. The album featured 11 original compositions. According to Balceris, its production involved experimentation with different musical genres and arrangements.

The title track of Mākslas darbs was released as a single in January 2024. The duo subsequently promoted the album with the songs "Lai kvēl" and "Bantītes", and announced an anniversary concert at the Sigulda Castle Ruins open-air stage for 6 July. The performance was part of their celebrations marking 15 years since the group's formation.

On 1 October 2026, Musiqq released Nemainīgi mainīgs, a ten-track album that included the singles "Nākamā vasara" and "Tu zini mani no galvas", the latter recorded with singer Tikasha Sakama. The album was made available on major digital music platforms.

The release was promoted with a concert scheduled for 10 October 2026 at Xiaomi Arena in Riga. The event was announced as a presentation of the new album alongside performances of songs from the duo's earlier releases.

== Musical style ==
Musiqq's music incorporates pop music, rhythm and blues, soul and hip-hop influences. Ogļezņevs is primarily responsible for the duo's songwriting and production, while both members perform vocals.

The duo have recorded songs in Latvian, English and Russian. Their 2015 album Silta sirds marked a departure from their earlier arrangements through its emphasis on acoustic instrumentation.

== Members ==
- Marats Ogļezņevs – vocals, songwriting and production
- Emīls Balceris – vocals

== Discography ==
=== Albums ===
Year	Title	Notes
2010	Šī ir tikai mūzika	Debut studio album
2014	Vēl viena mūzika	Second studio album
2015	Silta sirds	Acoustic studio album
2019	10	Tenth-anniversary album
2023	Bijis, ir un būs	Mini-album inspired by Līvi
2024	Mākslas darbs	Fifteenth-anniversary album
2026	Nemainīgi mainīgs	Ten-track album

== Awards and recognition ==
Musiqq received early recognition through the Latvian Radio 2 music competition Muzikālā banka. Their single "Abrakadabra" won the 2009 edition, while "Dzimšanas diena" placed third in the following year's competition.

In March 2010, Ogļezņevs and Balceris received the Gada Liepājnieks (Liepāja Person of the Year) recognition in the music category.

Their songs also received recognition through Latvia's copyright awards, including three Autortiesību bezgalības balva awards, which recognise the extensive use of musical works.

In 2015, Musiqq won the audience-voted Alfa award for "Sekundes", while the musicians' separate project Bermudu Divstūris received the Golden Microphone award for Best Hip-Hop or Dance Music Album.

In 2017, their collaboration with Brainstorm, "Debesis iekrita tevī", won three Zelta mikrofons awards, including Best Song and Radio Hit.

Preceded by Aisha with "What For?"	Latvia in the Eurovision Song Contest; 2011	Succeeded by Anmary with "Beautiful Song"
