= Roberto Agostino Meloni =

Italian-Latvian singer

Roberto Meloni
- Born: Roberto Agostino Meloni; 6 December 1977 (age 48); Ardara, Sardinia, Italy
- Origin: Latvia
- Occupation: Singer

Roberto Agostino Meloni (born 6 December 1977 in Ardara, Sardinia, Italy), is an Italian singer and television presenter currently residing in Latvia.

He represented Latvia twice in a row in the Eurovision Song Contest, in 2007 as part of the group Bonaparti.lv and again in 2008 as part of Pirates of the Sea. At the 2009 contest, he announced the points given by Latvia.
