= Freakin' Out =

Freakin' Out may refer to:

- "Freakin' Out" (Dexter and the Moonrocks song)
- "Freakin' Out" (Graham Coxon song)
- "Freakin' Out / All Over Me"
