= Mad Show Boys =

Latvian musical group

- Origin: Latvia
- Genres: Pop
- Members: Garijs Poļskis, Aldis Zaļūksnis, Angela Serkevich, Aleksandrs Veselovs, Leonid Sprat, Santa Savicka-Drozdova, Martins Kits, Andris Lapins, Mister X
- Past members: Jānis Vaišļa,

Mad Show Boys is a Latvian band. They participated in the Latvian national selection for Eurovision Song Contest 2012 in Azerbaijan with their song "Music Thief" (3rd place in superfinal) and for Eurovision Song Contest 2014 in Denmark with their song "I Need a Soul-Twin" ( semi-final).

Mad Show Boys consists of Garijs Poļskis (Гарри Польский) as leader of the band, lead vocal and songs author, Aleksandrs Veselovs as vocal, Leonid Sprat (since 2019) as vocal, Angela Serkevich as vocal (since 2013), Santa Savicka-Drozdova as vocal (since 2019), Martiņš Kits as vocal (songs in Latvian language), Andris Lapiņš as back vocal, Aldis Zaļūksnis, Jānis Vaišļa, Misters X. Jānis Vaišļa has previously participated in Eurovision with band Pirates of the Sea (Eurovision 2008).

== Discography ==
- Включите улыбальнички! (2011)
- Sorry for Bad English! (2013)
- Эпидемия добра (2015)
- Romantika (2016)
- Чудо из ниоткуда (2020)
- Классный день календаря (2024)
