= Bonaparti.lv =

Latvian musical group

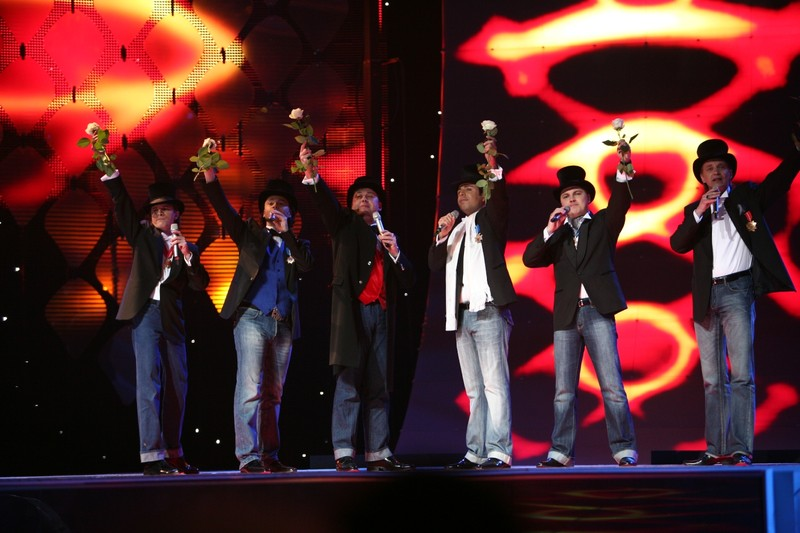

Background information
- Origin: Riga, Latvia
- Genres: Operatic pop Classical crossover
- Years active: 2007
- Labels: Microphone Records, MRCS 061
- Past members: Normunds Jakušonoks; Zigfrīds Muktupāvels; Kaspars Tīmanis; Andris Ābelīte; Andris Ērglis; Roberto Meloni
- Website: www.bonaparti.lv

Bonaparti.lv was a sextet consisting of Latvian tenors, that participated in Eurovision Song Contest 2007 with their song "Questa Notte" (Tonight).

In 2006, Swedish composer Kjell Jennstig composed a song named "Tonight", which he submitted to Eirodziesma 2007 - the Latvian national qualification for the Eurovision Song Contest. The rules of Eirodziesma envisages, that there must be Latvian artists, so Jennstig found six Latvian tenors, who founded the new band - Bonaparti.lv. The members of this project are three members of Latvian band "Labvēlīgais Tips", Normunds Jakušonoks, Kaspars Tīmanis and Andris Ābelīte, lead singer of "Bet Bet" Zigfrīds Muktupāvels, lead singer of "Cacao" Andris Ērglis, and Roberto Meloni, an Italian-born Latvian immigrant who was originally entered in Eirodziesma 2007 with "Feels Like Heaven" a duet performed with Stacey (as a result of Meloni's recruitment for Bonaparti.lv "Feels Like Heaven" would be performed in Eirodziesma 2007 by Stacey solo). The lyrics and name of the song became Italian, and the new title was "Questa Notte".

On 3 February 2007 Bonaparti.lv won the 2nd semi-final of Eirodziesma with 9909 votes. On 24 February they at first won the 1st round of final, and then along with 2 other contestants competed in superfinal. Bonaparti.lv with "Questa notte" had a convincing victory with 49,422 votes, which was more than 3 times more than the 2nd place had.

On 10 May Bonaparti.lv qualified to the final of the Eurovision Song Contest 2007, by finishing in the top 10 of the semi-final. In the final, they presented their song in the 14th position, following France and preceding Russia and got 16th place in final voting.

They separated but then reformed after some years.

Awards and achievements
| Preceded by Vocal Group Cosmos with "I Hear Your Heart" | Latvia in the Eurovision Song Contest; 2007 | Succeeded by Pirates of the Sea with "Wolves of the Sea" |
