= Valters Frīdenbergs =

Latvian musician, singer, and TV presenter (1987–2018)

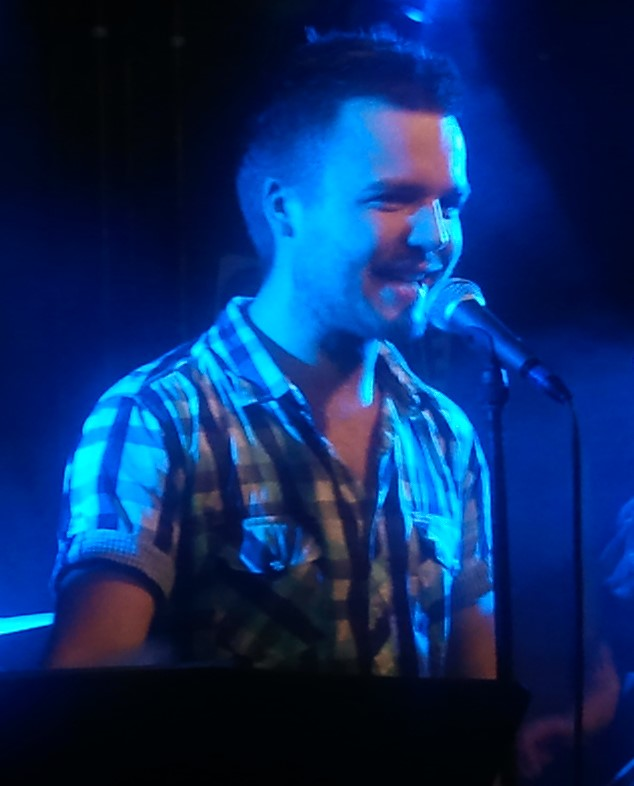
- Valters Frīdenbergs performing as part of Tumsa band in 2011

Background information
- Born: 26 October 1987; Riga, Latvian SSR, Soviet Union
- Origin: Riga, Latvia
- Died: 17 October 2018 (aged 30) Latvia
- Occupations: Musician, singer, TV personality
- Years active: 2005–2018
- Formerly of: Valters and Kaža; Putnu Balle; Tumsa

Valters Frīdenbergs (26 October 1987 – 17 October 2018) was a Latvian musician, singer and TV-presenter. He was best known for representing Latvia in the Eurovision Song Contest 2005 as part of Valters and Kaža duo with the song "The War Is Not Over", written by Mārtiņš Freimanis, finishing in fifth place with 153 points.

In 2009, Valters made a solo effort to represent Latvia with his song "For A Better Tomorrow" but failed to qualify from the semi-final.

Two years later he became the Latvian commentator of the Eurovision Song Contest succeeding Kārlis Streips. He filled this role until his illness and subsequent death. Valters was also Latvia's spokesperson at the Eurovision Song Contest 2012.

On 17 October 2018, it was announced that Valters Frīdenbergs had died of cancer, from which he had been suffering for two years.

== See also ==
- Latvia in the Eurovision Song Contest
