= Latvia in the Eurovision Song Contest 2020 =

- Eurovision Song Contest 2020
- Country: Latvia
- Selection process: Supernova 2020
- Selection date: 8 February 2020

Competing entry
- Song: "Still Breathing"
- Artist: Samanta Tīna
- Songwriters: Samanta Tīna; Aminata Savadogo

Placement
- Final result: Contest cancelled

Participation chronology

Latvia was set to be represented at the Eurovision Song Contest 2020 with the song "Still Breathing" written by Samanta Tīna and Aminata Savadogo. The song was performed by Samanta Tīna. Songwriter Aminata Savadogo represented Latvia in the Eurovision Song Contest 2015 with the song "Love Injected" where she placed sixth in the grand final of the competition. The Latvian broadcaster Latvijas Televīzija (LTV) organized the national final Supernova 2020 in order to select the Latvian entry for the 2020 contest in Rotterdam, Netherlands. Nine songs were selected to compete in the national final on 8 February 2020 where a public televote exclusively selected "Still Breathing" performed by Samanta Tīna as the winner.

Latvia was drawn to compete in the second semi-final of the Eurovision Song Contest, which would have taken place on 14 May 2020. However, the contest was cancelled due to the COVID-19 pandemic.

== Background ==
Prior to the 2020 contest, Latvia had participated in the Eurovision Song Contest twenty times since its first entry in 2000. Latvia won the contest once in 2002 with the song "I Wanna" performed by Marie N. Following the introduction of semi-finals for the 2004, Latvia was able to qualify to compete in the final between 2005 and 2008. Between 2009 and 2014, the nation had failed to qualify to the final for six consecutive years before managing to qualify to the final in 2015 and 2016. Latvia had failed to qualify to the final for three consecutive years since 2017 including with their 2019 entry "That Night" performed by Carousel.

The Latvian national broadcaster, Latvijas Televīzija (LTV), broadcasts the event within Latvia and organises the selection process for the nation's entry. LTV confirmed their intentions to participate at the 2020 Eurovision Song Contest on 10 October 2019. Latvia has selected their entries for the Eurovision Song Contest through a national final. Since their debut in 2000 until 2012, LTV had organised the selection show Eirodziesma. In a response to the nation's failure to qualify to the final at Eurovision since 2008, between 2013 and 2014, the competition was rebranded and retooled as Dziesma. After failing to produce successful entries those two years, LTV developed and had organised the Supernova national final since 2015. Along with their participation confirmation, the broadcaster announced that they would organise Supernova 2020 in order to select the Latvian entry for the 2020 contest.

== Before Eurovision ==
=== Supernova 2020 ===
Supernova 2020 was the sixth edition of Supernova, the music competition that selects Latvia's entries for the Eurovision Song Contest. The competition took place at the LTV studios in Riga on 8 February 2020, hosted by Toms Grēviņš, Ketija Šēnberga and Beta Beidz and broadcast on LTV1 as well as online via the streaming platform Replay.lv. An alternative broadcast also occurred on LTV7 with presentation in sign language. The show was watched by over 145,000 viewers in Latvia, while the online broadcast was watched by over 27,000 users from 75 countries.

==== Format ====
The format of the competition consisted of a final held on 8 February 2020 that selected the Latvian entry for Rotterdam from nine competing entries. A public vote exclusively determined which entry would be the winner. Viewers were able to vote once per each phone number via telephone or via SMS, while the online vote conducted through the official Supernova website allowed users to vote up to five times per each accepted social network account: Draugiem.lv, Facebook and Twitter. Due to technical issues, only one vote per account was ultimately counted in the online vote.

During the show, a jury provided feedback to the competing artists. The panel consisted of:

- Maarja Merivoo-Parro – editor-in-chief of Raadio 2 Estonia
- Gerūta Griniūtė – Lithuanian cultural presenter and event host
- Petri Mannonen – representative of Universal Music Finland and the Baltics
- Artis Dvarionas – producer at Radio SWH

==== Competing entries ====
Artists and songwriters were able to submit their entries to the broadcaster between 10 October 2019 and 20 November 2019. A record 126 entries were submitted at the conclusion of the submission period. A jury panel appointed by LTV evaluated the submitted songs and shortlisted 28 entries. The jury panel consisted of:

- Agnese Cimuška-Rekke – Latvian Music Development Society
- Aiga Leitholde – Music Reviewer
- Liena Grīna – Latvian Association of Performers and Producters
- Sabīne Brice – Universal Music Latvia
- Ilze Jansone – Supernova Producer
- Inese Saulāja – Warner Music Latvia
- Kaspars Zaviļeiskis – Music Journalist
- Jānis Žilde – Musician, TVnet Kultura+ Presenter
- Kaspars Mauriņš – Latvijas Radio 2
- Rūdolfs Švēde – Radio Tev
- Emīls Kazakovs – Kurzemes Radio
- Toms Grēviņš – Pieci.lv
- Artis Dvarionas – Radio SWH
- Aleksis Vilciņš – Pieci.lv
- Edgars Bāliņš – Wiwibloggs
- Petri Mannonen – Universal Music Finland and the Baltics
- Martti Vuorinen – Universal Music A&R
- Pēteris Krievkalns – Creative Director for Supernova

Auditions in front of alternate jury panel took place on 21 and 22 November 2019 and featured 26 of the 28 shortlisted entries, with their performances being listed online on the official Supernova YouTube channel on 9 January 2020. Eight performers and songs were determined while taking YouTube views of each entry between 9 and 15 January 2020 into consideration. An additional entry, "Like Me" performed by Seleste, was selected due to the artist's newcomer status. The nine competing artists and songs were announced on 16 January 2020. Among the artists was Katrīna Dimanta who represented Latvia in the Eurovision Song Contest 2014 as part of Aarzemnieki.

Live Audition Round
Artist	Song	Songwriter(s)
Aivo Oskis	"Dive Deep"	Aivis Ošķis, Bruce Mendes, Ruslans Kuksinovičs
Alekss Silvērs	"Again"	Alekss Silvērs, Andis Ansons, Uku Moldau
Alise Haijima	"Me Me Song"	Lotars Lodziņš, Jānis Kalve, Artūrs Palkevičs, Valdis Čirksts
Annemarija Moiseja	"Undo"	Mārtiņš Gailītis, Jans Vavra, Annemarija Moiseja, Reinis Straume
Annna	"Polyester"	Anna Madara Pērkone
Antra Stafecka and Atis Ieviņš	"Coming Over"	Atis Ieviņš, Jānis Čubars
Audiokvartāls	"Connection"	Ivars Ozoliņš, Arnis Ozoliņš, Juris Ludženieks, Ludvigs Lielauss, Mārtiņš Gailītis, Valters Mirkšs, Reinis Straume
Bad Habits	"Sail with You"	Mārtiņš Balodis, Kristaps Grīnbergs, Normans Bārbals, Jānis Līde
Driksna	"Stay"	Jānis Driksna, Aidan O'Connor
Edgars Kreilis	"Tridymite"	Edgars Kreilis, Ingars Viļums
Elizabete Gaile	"For You"	Elizabete Gaile, Edijs Ostapko, Jūlijs Melngailis
Katrīna Bindere	"I Will Break Your Heart"	Katrīna Anete Bindere-Čodere, Jānis Driksna, Niklāvs Sekačs
Katrīna Dimanta	"Heart Beats"	Katrīna Dimanta, Herberts Blumbergs, Andis Ansons, Jānis Bērziņš
Laika Upe	"All My Roads"	Reinis Straume, Kaspars Ansons, Guntis Nurža, Atis Čamanis, Reinis Petrovičs, Jānis Pastars, Edgars Ansons-Tomsons
Līva	"Not That Important to You"	Līva Komarovska, Kaspars Ansons, Uku Moldau
Madara	"Māras zeme"	Madara Fogelmane
Maia	"Make It Real"	Maija Aukšmuksta, Reinis Ašmanis
Markus Riva	"Impossible"	Markus Riva, Aminata Savadogo
Miks Dukurs	"I'm Falling for You"	Miks Dukurs
Rūta Ķergalve	"Izgaismots"	Rūta Ķergalve
Sabīne Blūma Blūmane	"Beauty Will Save the World"	Gaitis Lazdāns, Diāna Žukova
Samanta Tīna	"Still Breathing"	Samanta Tīna, Aminata Savadogo
Seleste	"Like Me"	Reinis Briģis, Seleste Solovjova-Vlasova
Shanti	"Voices in My Mind"	Liene Matveja, Santa Dzalbe, Linda Ozola
Signe and Jānis	"Inner Light"	Jānis Aizupietis, Signe Aizupiete, Asnāte Tarvide
Toms Kalderauskis	"Be My Truth"	Liene Atvara, Toms Kalderauskis, Roberts Memmēns

Artist	Song	Songwriter(s)
Annna	"Polyester"	Anna Madara Pērkone
Bad Habits	"Sail with You"	Mārtiņš Balodis, Kristaps Grīnbergs, Normans Bārbals, Jānis Līde
Driksna	"Stay"	Jānis Driksna, Aidan O'Connor
Edgars Kreilis	"Tridymite"	Edgars Kreilis, Ingars Viļums
Katrīna Bindere	"I Will Break Your Heart"	Katrīna Anete Bindere-Čodere, Jānis Driksna, Niklāvs Sekačs
Katrīna Dimanta	"Heart Beats"	Katrīna Dimanta, Herberts Blumbergs, Andis Ansons, Jānis Bērziņš
Miks Dukurs	"I'm Falling for You"	Miks Dukurs
Samanta Tīna	"Still Breathing"	Samanta Tīna, Aminata Savadogo
Seleste	"Like Me"	Reinis Briģis, Seleste Solovjova-Vlasova

==== Final ====
The final took place on 8 February 2020. Nine acts competed and the song with the highest number of votes from the public, "Still Breathing" performed by Samanta Tīna, was declared the winner.

Final – 8 February 2020
R/O	Artist	Song	Public Vote			Place
R/O	Artist	Song	Internet	Televote	Total	Place
1	Seleste	"Like Me"	2.43%	3.31%	2.82%	6
2	Driksna	"Stay"	1.04%	1.90%	1.42%	9
3	Katrīna Bindere	"I Will Break Your Heart"	1.22%	1.89%	1.52%	8
4	Edgars Kreilis	"Tridymite"	2.74%	2.11%	2.46%	7
5	Katrīna Dimanta	"Heart Beats"	22.63%	34.98%	28.12%	2
6	Miks Dukurs	"I'm Falling for You"	7.69%	6.93%	7.35%	4
7	Annna	"Polyester"	19.22%	13.84%	16.83%	3
8	Bad Habits	"Sail with You"	3.79%	4.40%	4.06%	5
9	Samanta Tīna	"Still Breathing"	39.24%	30.63%	35.42%	1

== At Eurovision ==
According to Eurovision rules, all nations with the exceptions of the host country and the "Big Five" (France, Germany, Italy, Spain and the United Kingdom) are required to qualify from one of two semi-finals in order to compete for the final; the top ten countries from each semi-final progress to the final. The European Broadcasting Union (EBU) split up the competing countries into six different pots based on voting patterns from previous contests, with countries with favourable voting histories put into the same pot. On 28 January 2020, a special allocation draw was held which placed each country into one of the two semi-finals, as well as which half of the show they would perform in. Latvia was placed into the second semi-final, to be held on 14 May 2020, and was scheduled to perform in the second half of the show. However, due to 2019-20 pandemic of Coronavirus, the contest was cancelled.

Prior to the Eurovision Song Celebration YouTube broadcast in place of the semi-finals, it was revealed on Twitter alongside the opening slot in the first semi-final that Latvia was set to perform last in position 18, after the entry from Bulgaria.
