= Latvia in the Eurovision Song Contest 2021 =

- Eurovision Song Contest 2021
- Country: Latvia
- Selection process: Internal selection
- Announcement date: Artist: 16 May 2020; Song: 12 March 2021

Competing entry
- Song: "The Moon Is Rising"
- Artist: Samanta Tīna
- Songwriters: Samanta Tīna; Aminata Savadogo; Oskars Uhaņs

Placement
- Semi-final result: Failed to qualify (17th)

Participation chronology

Latvia was represented at the Eurovision Song Contest 2021 with the song "The Moon Is Rising" written by Samanta Tīna, Aminata Savadogo and Oskars Uhaņs. The song was performed by Samanta Tīna, who was internally selected by Latvian broadcaster Latvijas Televīzija (LTV) to represent that nation at the 2021 contest in Rotterdam, Netherlands. Songwriter Aminata Savadogo represented Latvia in the Eurovision Song Contest 2015 with the song "Love Injected" where she placed sixth in the grand final of the competition. Samanta Tīna was announced as the Latvian representative on 2 April 2020 after she was due to compete in the 2020 contest with "Still Breathing" before the 2020 event's cancellation. Her song, "The Moon Is Rising", was presented to the public on 12 March 2021 during the final episode of the special documentary series Kā uzvarēt Eirovīzijā? Samantas Tīnas ceļš uz Roterdamu.

Latvia was drawn to compete in the second semi-final of the Eurovision Song Contest which took place on 20 May 2021. Performing during the show in position 15, "The Moon Is Rising" was not announced among the top 10 entries of the second semi-final and therefore did not qualify to compete in the final. It was later revealed that Latvia placed seventeenth (last) out of the 17 participating countries in the semi-final with 14 points.

== Background ==
Prior to the 2021 contest, Latvia had participated in the Eurovision Song Contest twenty times since its first entry in 2000. Latvia won the contest once in 2002 with the song "I Wanna" performed by Marie N. Following the introduction of semi-finals for the 2004, Latvia was able to qualify to compete in the final between 2005 and 2008. Between 2009 and 2014, the nation had failed to qualify to the final for six consecutive years before managing to qualify to the final in 2015 and 2016. Latvia had failed to qualify to the final for three consecutive years since 2017 including with their 2019 entry "That Night" performed by Carousel.

The Latvian national broadcaster, Latvijas Televīzija (LTV), broadcasts the event within Latvia and organises the selection process for the nation's entry. LTV confirmed their intentions to participate at the 2021 Eurovision Song Contest on 16 May 2020. Latvia has selected their entries for the Eurovision Song Contest through a national final. Since their debut in 2000 until 2012, LTV had organised the selection show Eirodziesma. In a response to the nation's failure to qualify to the final at Eurovision since 2008, between 2013 and 2014, the competition was rebranded and retooled as Dziesma. After failing to produce successful entries those two years, LTV developed and had organised the Supernova national final since 2015. The broadcaster internally selected both the artist and song for the 2021 contest, marking the first time that an internal selection was held for a Latvian Eurovision entry.

== Before Eurovision ==
=== Internal selection ===
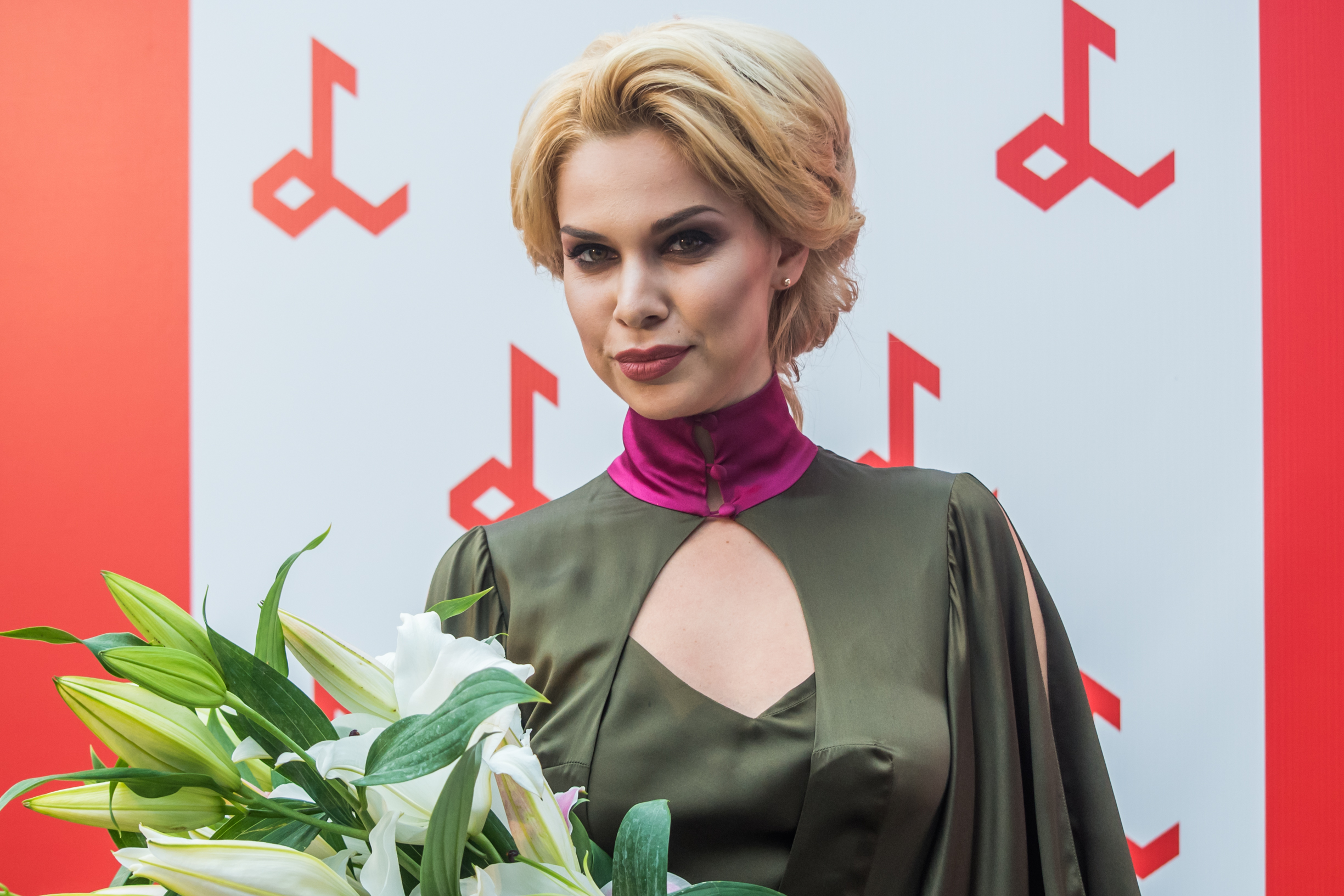
Samanta Tīna was internally selected to represent Latvia in the Eurovision Song Contest 2021 following the cancellation of the 2020 contest

The Latvian entry for the Eurovision Song Contest 2021 was selected internally. On 16 May 2020, LTV confirmed during their pre-show discussion of the replacement show Eurovision: Europe Shine a Light that Samanta Tīna would remain as Latvia's representative for the Eurovision Song Contest 2021. To create her contest entry, 11 potential songs were written for consideration by several songwriters appointed by the singer during a two-day songwriting camp organised by RigaLive and held in late 2020. In regards to her song, Samanta Tīna stated: "I wasn't looking for a standard Eurovision classic! I wanted to have that surprise, the craziness. I wanted the song to have something glorifying so that everyone knows it's Latvia when we come out!"

The song "The Moon Is Rising" was presented to the public on 12 March 2021 during the final episode of the special documentary series Kā uzvarēt Eirovīzijā? Samantas Tīnas ceļš uz Roterdamu (How to win at Eurovision? Samanta Tīna's Road to Rotterdam) that covered the background preparation processes for Samanta Tīna's Eurovision performance, song and its accompanying music video, the latter being filmed by Ritvars Bluka using a mobile phone with direction and production by Aiga Baikova and Tīna herself. The documentary consisted of five episodes, commencing on 12 February 2021 and was broadcast on LTV1 as well as online via the streaming platform Replay.lv. "The Moon Is Rising" was written by Samanta Tīna together with Aminata Savadogo and Oskars Uhaņs. Savadogo represented Latvia in the Eurovision Song Contest 2015 and had composed the Latvian song in 2016.

In my song, I advocate that we all women are equal, no matter who we are. We are not women, but The Woman, we are each a queen, and each has its own crown. There's also text (sic) that dirty games aren't my thing, I can go with an open heart. My role will be the same. To say how it is and it will be.

— Samanta Tīna about "The Moon Is Rising"

=== Promotion ===
Prior to the contest, Samanta Tīna specifically promoted "The Moon Is Rising" as the Latvian Eurovision entry on 17 March 2021 by performing during the Zelta Mikrofons 2021 award show, which was held at the Art and Media Technical School in Riga.

== At Eurovision ==
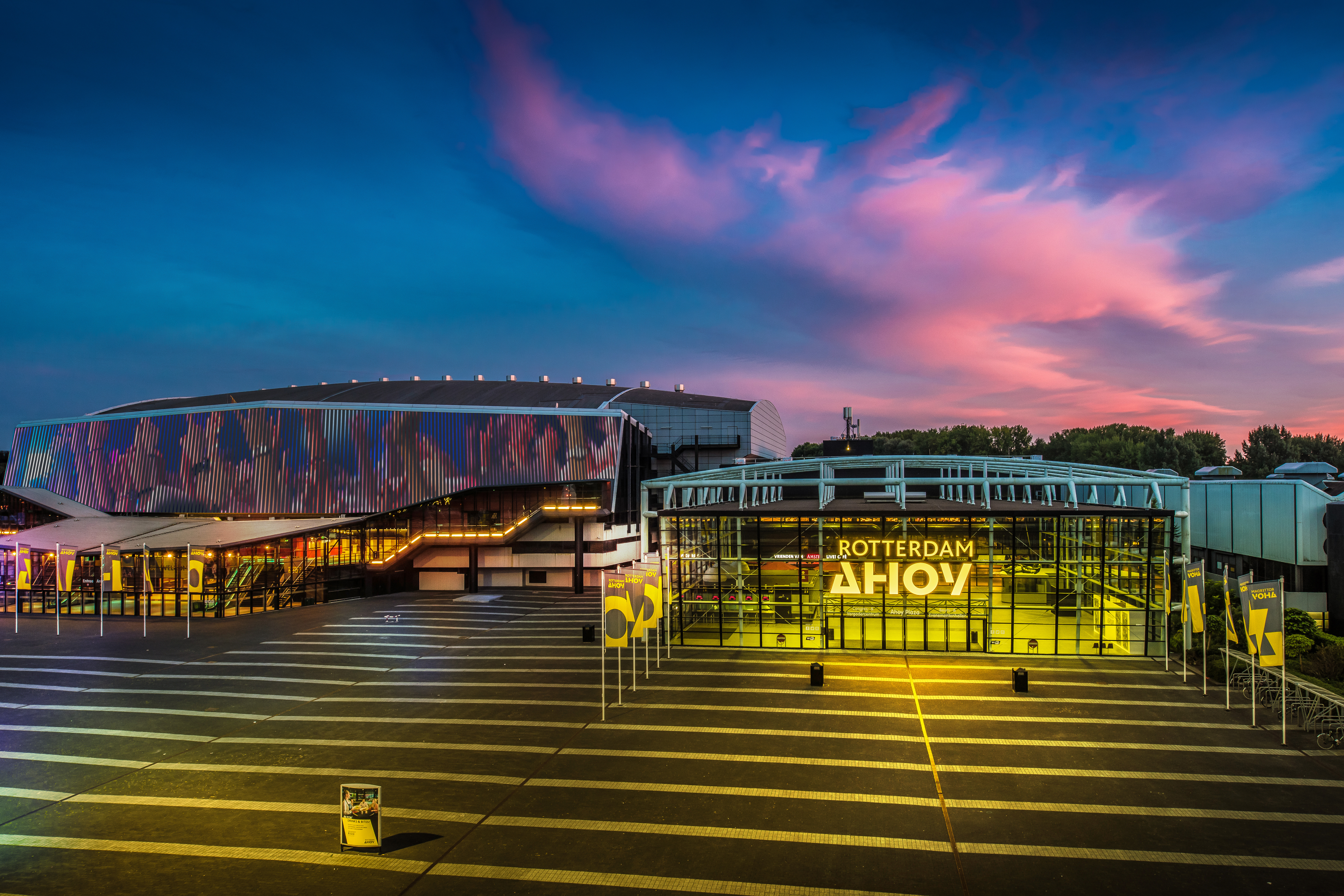
The Eurovision Song Contest 2021 took place at the Rotterdam Ahoy in Rotterdam, Netherlands

According to Eurovision rules, all nations with the exceptions of the host country and the "Big Five" (France, Germany, Italy, Spain and the United Kingdom) are required to qualify from one of two semi-finals in order to compete for the final; the top ten countries from each semi-final progress to the final. The European Broadcasting Union (EBU) split up the competing countries into six different pots based on voting patterns from previous contests, with countries with favourable voting histories put into the same pot. The semi-final allocation draw held for the Eurovision Song Contest 2020 on 28 January 2020 was used for the 2021 contest, which Latvia was placed into the second semi-final, to be held on 20 May 2021, and was scheduled to perform in the second half of the show.

Once all the competing songs for the 2021 contest had been released, the running order for the semi-finals was decided by the shows' producers rather than through another draw, so that similar songs were not placed next to each other. Latvia was set to perform in position 15, following the entry from Finland and before the entry from Switzerland.

The two semi-finals and the final were broadcast in Latvia on LTV1 with all shows featuring commentary by Toms Grēviņš who was joined by Marie N for the final. The Latvian spokesperson, who announced the top 12-point score awarded by the Latvian jury during the final, was Aminata.

=== Semi-final ===
Samanta Tīna took part in technical rehearsals on 11 and 14 May, followed by dress rehearsals on 19 and 20 May. This included the jury show on 19 May where the professional juries of each country watched and voted on the competing entries.

The Latvian performance featured Samanta Tīna in a long green dress with fringe and crystal embellishments that symbolised femininity to create the image of a goddess, joined on stage by three backing vocalists on the side in a spaced apart line next to Tīna wearing green tights and plastic visors. During the performance, the performers did a dance routine by crowning themselves with an imaginary crown. The stage colours were green and gold as well as purple and pink with the LED screens displaying kaleidoscopic graphics that moved outwards in a circle, followed by occasional outbursts of gold and a golden hand flower. The stage outfits were designed by Latvian designer Kašers. The three backing vocalists that joined Samanta Tīna were: Kitija Bluma, Paula Saija and Una Daniela Aizgale.

At the end of the show, Latvia was not announced among the top 10 entries in the second semi-final and therefore failed to qualify to compete in the final. It was later revealed that Latvia placed seventeenth (last) in the semi-final, receiving a total of 14 points: 10 points from the televoting and 4 points from the juries.

=== Voting ===
Voting during the three shows involved each country awarding two sets of points from 1-8, 10 and 12: one from their professional jury and the other from televoting. Each nation's jury consisted of five music industry professionals who are citizens of the country they represent. This jury judged each entry based on: vocal capacity; the stage performance; the song's composition and originality; and the overall impression by the act. In addition, each member of a national jury may only take part in the panel once every three years, and no jury was permitted to discuss of their vote with other members or be related in any way to any of the competing acts in such a way that they cannot vote impartially and independently. The individual rankings of each jury member in an anonymised form as well as the nation's televoting results were released shortly after the grand final.

Below is a breakdown of points awarded to Latvia and awarded by Latvia in the second semi-final and grand final of the contest, and the breakdown of the jury voting and televoting conducted during the two shows:

==== Points awarded to Latvia ====
Points awarded to Latvia (Semi-final 2)
Score	Televote	Jury
12 points		
10 points		
8 points		
7 points		
6 points		
5 points	Georgia	
4 points	United Kingdom	Moldova
3 points		
2 points		
1 point	Estonia	

==== Points awarded by Latvia ====
Points awarded by Latvia (Semi-final 2)
Score	Televote	Jury
12 points	Moldova	Iceland
10 points	Estonia	Switzerland
8 points	Finland	Portugal
7 points	Iceland	Finland
6 points	Switzerland	Bulgaria
5 points	Portugal	Albania
4 points	Denmark	Moldova
3 points	Georgia	Estonia
2 points	Bulgaria	San Marino
1 point	Greece	Austria

Points awarded by Latvia (Final)
Score	Televote	Jury
12 points	Lithuania	Switzerland
10 points	Russia	Iceland
8 points	Finland	Italy
7 points	Italy	Ukraine
6 points	Ukraine	Lithuania
5 points	Iceland	Bulgaria
4 points	Switzerland	Finland
3 points	France	France
2 points	Norway	Malta
1 point	Sweden	Russia

==== Detailed voting results ====
The following members comprised the Latvian jury:

- Patrīcija Cuprijanoviča (Patrisha)
- Magnuss Eriņš
- Valts Pūce
- Kaspars Zemītis
- Guna Zučika

Detailed voting results from Latvia (Semi-final 2)
R/O	Country	Jury							Televote	
R/O	Country	Juror A	Juror B	Juror C	Juror D	Juror E	Rank	Points	Rank	Points
01	San Marino	4	5	12	11	14	9	2	12	
02	Estonia	12	9	6	6	7	8	3	2	10
03	Czech Republic	7	8	15	13	11	13		13	
04	Greece	10	11	5	7	10	11		10	1
05	Austria	11	10	11	10	3	10	1	11	
06	Poland	14	15	10	16	13	16		16	
07	Moldova	13	14	1	9	15	7	4	1	12
08	Iceland	5	2	2	1	1	1	12	4	7
09	Serbia	6	13	13	15	16	14		15	
10	Georgia	16	7	16	14	12	15		8	3
11	Albania	2	12	9	12	8	6	5	14	
12	Portugal	9	3	8	2	6	3	8	6	5
13	Bulgaria	8	4	7	3	5	5	6	9	2
14	Finland	3	6	4	5	9	4	7	3	8
15	Latvia									
16	Switzerland	1	1	3	4	2	2	10	5	6
17	Denmark	15	16	14	8	4	12		7	4

Detailed voting results from Latvia (Final)
R/O	Country	Jury							Televote	
R/O	Country	Juror A	Juror B	Juror C	Juror D	Juror E	Rank	Points	Rank	Points
01	Cyprus	21	22	24	25	25	25		20	
02	Albania	17	23	22	23	17	23		24	
03	Israel	19	19	18	20	16	21		19	
04	Belgium	9	8	10	6	19	12		13	
05	Russia	10	10	6	5	18	10	1	2	10
06	Malta	3	9	7	21	15	9	2	17	
07	Portugal	14	11	12	8	7	13		14	
08	Serbia	20	26	25	26	26	26		25	
09	United Kingdom	26	6	17	22	21	15		23	
10	Greece	13	18	16	15	6	14		16	
11	Switzerland	4	1	1	9	2	1	12	7	4
12	Iceland	7	3	2	4	1	2	10	6	5
13	Spain	22	21	26	16	20	24		26	
14	Moldova	23	25	13	18	24	22		11	
15	Germany	24	20	14	10	11	17		18	
16	Finland	12	5	5	7	8	7	4	3	8
17	Bulgaria	11	17	3	13	3	6	5	15	
18	Lithuania	5	2	19	3	10	5	6	1	12
19	Ukraine	1	13	8	1	14	4	7	5	6
20	France	6	7	9	11	4	8	3	8	3
21	Azerbaijan	15	24	15	12	22	20		12	
22	Norway	25	14	4	24	5	11		9	2
23	Netherlands	16	15	20	14	9	16		22	
24	Italy	2	4	11	2	12	3	8	4	7
25	Sweden	18	12	21	19	13	19		10	1
26	San Marino	8	16	23	17	23	18		21	
