= Heartbeat (Justs song) =

2016 single by Justs

Single by Justs Sirmais
- Released: 3 February 2016
- Recorded: 2015
- Length: 2:56
- Label: Aminata Music
- Songwriter(s): Aminata Savadogo
- Producer(s): Aminata Savadogo; Kaspars Ansons

Justs Sirmais singles chronology
"Heartbeat" (2016)	"Ko Tu Dari?" (2016)

Eurovision Song Contest 2016 entry
- Country: Latvia
- Artist(s): Justs Sirmais
- Language: English
- Composer(s): Aminata Savadogo
- Lyricist(s): Aminata Savadogo

Finals performance
- Semi-final result: 8th
- Semi-final points: 132
- Final result: 15th
- Final points: 132

Entry chronology
- ◄ "Love Injected" (2015)
- "Line" (2017) ►

"Heartbeat" is a song performed by Latvian singer Justs. The song represented Latvia in the Eurovision Song Contest 2016, and was written by previous Latvian Eurovision entrant Aminata Savadogo. The song was released as a digital download on 3 February 2016 through Aminata Music.

== Music video ==
The video was directed by Andzej Gavriss who also directed Aminata Savadogo's video for "Love Injected".

== Eurovision Song Contest ==
On 31 January 2016, Sirmais was announced as one of the twenty competing acts in the second season of Supernova, with the song "Heartbeat". In the first heat on 7 February, Sirmais advanced to the semi-final after winning over 40% of the televote. He competed in the semi-final on 21 February and advanced to the final through televoting. He later won the final on 28 February with 20,725 votes. Justs represented Latvia in the Eurovision Song Contest 2016, performing in the first half of the second semi-final, and received enough points to perform at the finals. There, the song achieved 15th place out of 26 finalists.

== Track listing ==
Digital download
No.	Title	Length
1.	"Heartbeart"	2:56

Remixes
No.	Title	Length
1.	"Heartbeat" (7th Heaven Radio Edit)	2:51
2.	"Heartbeat" (7th Heaven Club Mix)	6:03
3.	"Heartbeat" (Ex da Bass Radio Mix)	3:11
4.	"Heartbeat" (Ex da Bass Club Mix)	4:05
5.	"Heartbeat" (Dween Radio Mix)	3:42
6.	"Heartbeat" (Dween Extended Mix)	5:01
7.	"Heartbeat" (Ricky Mears & Shindo Remix)	3:10

== Charts ==
Chart (2016)	Peak position
Sweden (Sverigetopplistan)	80

== Release history ==
Region	Date	Format	Label
Worldwide	3 February 2016	Digital download	Aminata Music
