= Justs Sirmais =

Latvian singer

Justs
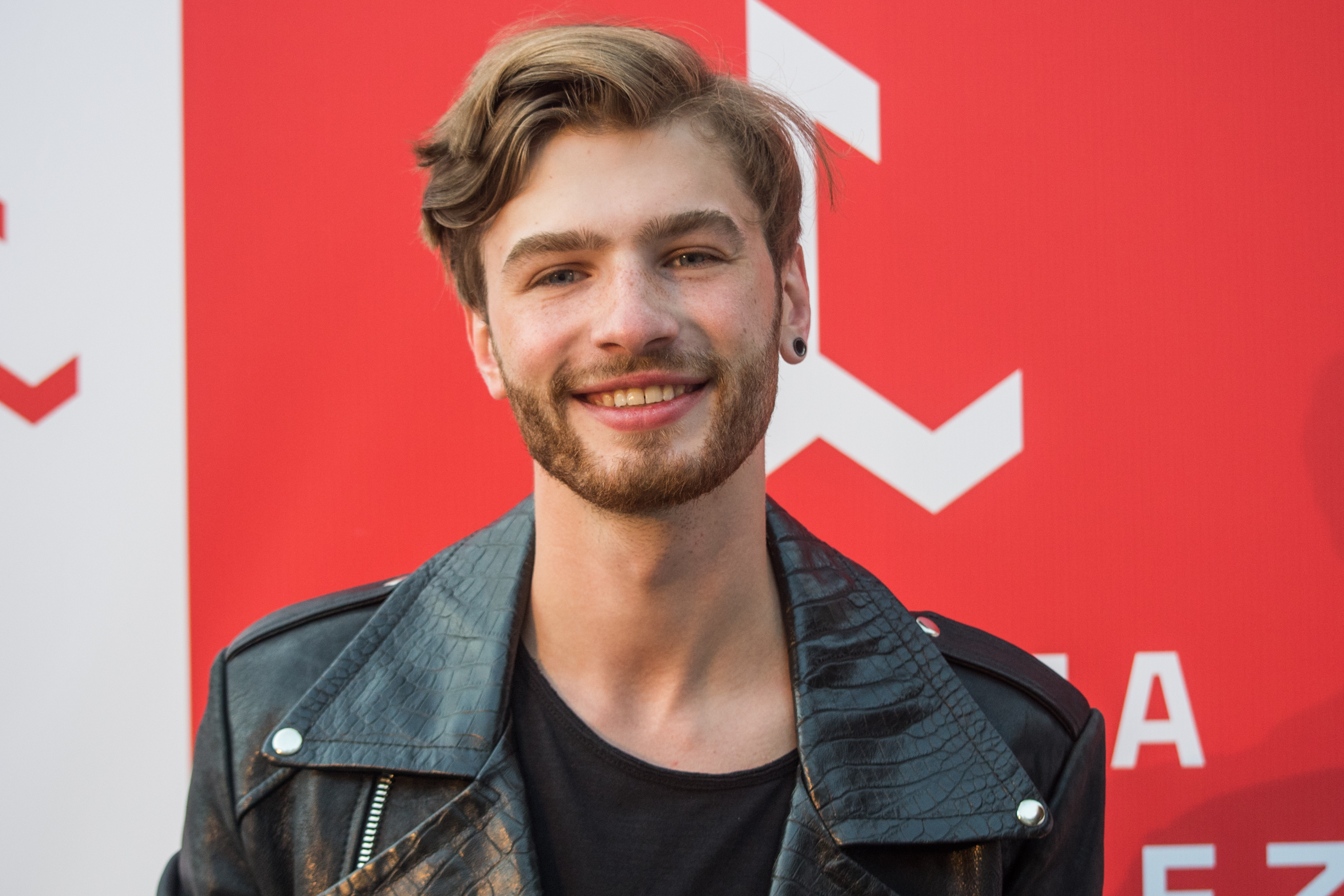
- Sirmais in 2017

Background information
- Born: Justs Sirmais; 6 February 1995 (age 31); Ķekava, Latvia
- Genres: Pop; rock; soul; electronic
- Occupations: Singer; television presenter
- Instrument: Vocals

Justs Sirmais (born 6 February 1995), also known as simply Justs, is a Latvian singer and television presenter. He represented Latvia in the Eurovision Song Contest 2016 with the song "Heartbeat".

== Life and career ==
=== Early life ===
Justs was born on 6 February 1995 in Ķekava. The eldest of three siblings, he attended Riga State Gymnasium No.1. He began his musical journey as a street musician in Riga.

=== 2015–present: Eurovision Song Contest 2016 ===
On 31 January 2016, Justs was announced as one of the 20 competing acts in the second season of Supernova, the show used to select Latvia's representative to the Eurovision Song Contest. He was competing with the song "Heartbeat", written by Latvia's 2015 entrant Aminata Savadogo. In the first heat on 7 February, Sirmais advanced to the semi-final after winning over 40% of the televote. He competed in the semi-final on 21 February and advanced to the final through televoting. On 28 February, he won the national final and then represented Latvia at the Eurovision Song Contest 2016 in Stockholm, Sweden. He made it through the semi-final and placed 15th in the final. Justs earned his country's sixth best placing ever. On 17 May 2016 he released the EP To Be Heard. On 23 May 2016 he released the single "Ko Tu Dari?" (English: "What Are You Doing").

In January 2018, it was announced that he would co-host Supernova 2018. In April 2018, Justs released his debut studio album, Here I Am.

In September 2018, Sirmais announced on Instagram that he would be studying Music Production at university in Bristol, United Kingdom.

In November 2020, Sirmais participated in the first season of Balss Maskā as "Sparrow", where he placed 3^{rd}.

He entered Supernova again in 2023 to attempt to represent Latvia with the song "Strangers", but he was eliminated in the semi-final. He participated again in 2025 with the song "Fit Right" and was again eliminated in the semi-final.

Since 2024, he has been working as a teacher at a high school in his hometown of Ķekava.

== Discography ==
=== Studio albums ===
Title	Details
Here I Am	Released: 20 April 2018; Label: Justs Entertainment; Format: Digital download, streaming

=== Extended plays ===
Title	Details
To Be Heard	Released: 17 May 2016; Label: Justs Entertainment; Format: Digital download

=== Singles ===
Title	Year	Peak chart positions		Album
Title	Year	RUS	SWE	Album
"Heartbeat"	2016	252	80	Non-album singles
"Kaut Mazliet"	2016	—	—	Non-album singles
"Ko Tu Dari"	2016	—	—	Non-album singles
"Latvijal"	2017	—	—	Non-album singles
"Message to You"	2017	—	—	Non-album singles
"Are You There"	2017	—	—	Here I Am
"Uz Palodzes"	2018	—	—	Here I Am
"Position in Here" (solo or remix featuring Makree)	2018	—	—	Here I Am
"Strangers"	2023	—	—	Non-album singles
"Baltajos Palagos"	2024	—	—	Non-album singles
"Atslēdziņas" (with Tikasha Sakama)	2024	—	—	Non-album singles
"Fit Right"	2024	—	—	Non-album singles
"—" denotes a single that did not chart or was not released in that territory.

==== As featured artist ====
Title	Year	Album
"Head High" (JJ Lush featuring Justs)	2018	Non-album singles
"Still Loving You" (Nicky Miles and Olga Palushina featuring Justs)	2019	Non-album singles
"SniegavĪri" (Mauzoleju Muuzika and Hotte featuring Justs)	2023	Demonu Dienas 3
"Viss, ko gribu" (OLAS, Emilija Loze featuring Justs)	2025	Non-album single

Awards and achievements
Preceded by Aminata with "Love Injected"	Latvia in the Eurovision Song Contest; 2016	Succeeded by Triana Park with "Line"
