= Aminata Savadogo =

Latvian singer-songwriter (born 1993)

Aminata
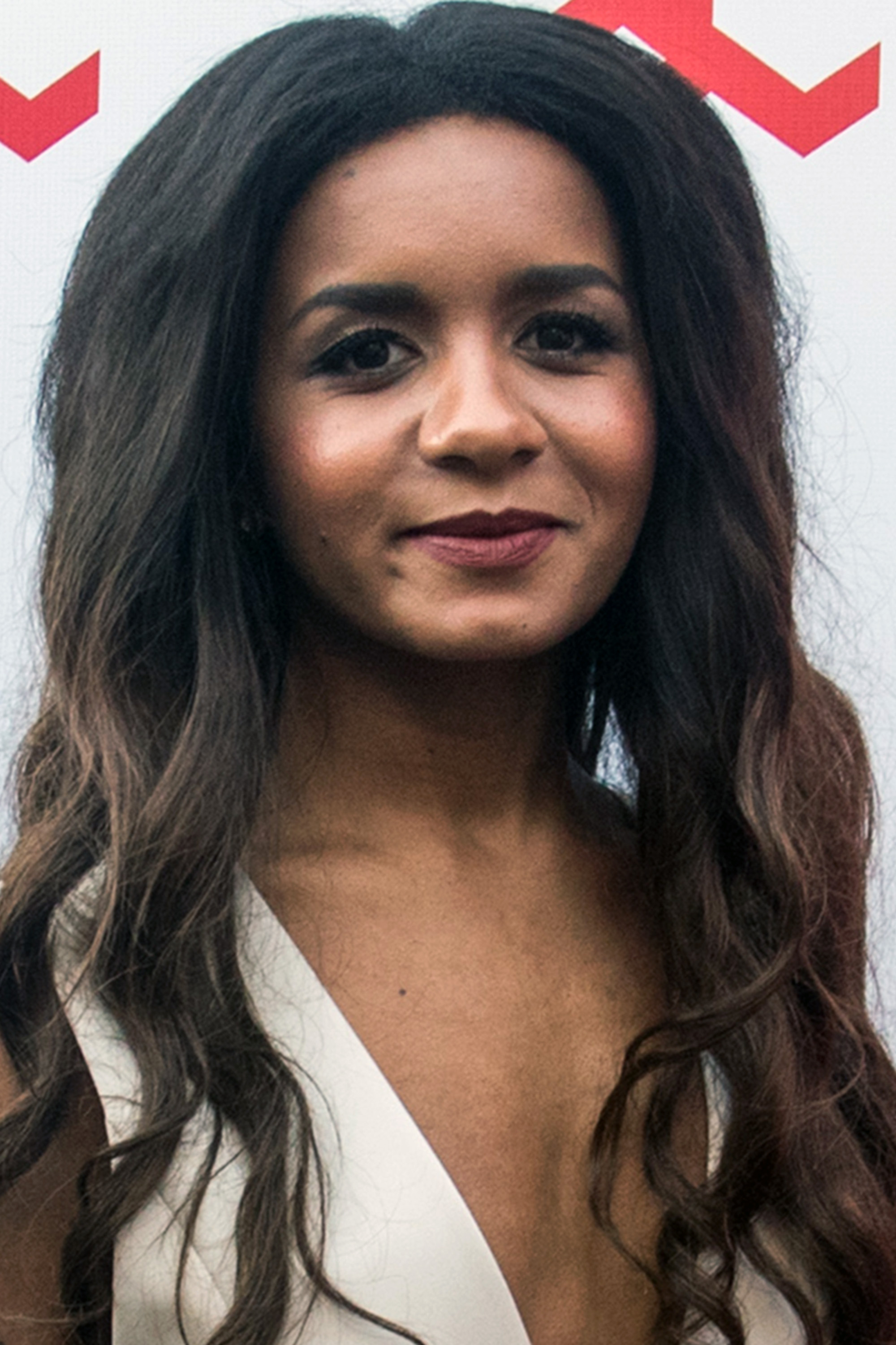
- Savadogo in 2017

Background information
- Also known as: Aminata
- Born: Aminata Savadogo; 9 January 1993 (age 33); Riga, Latvia
- Genres: Pop; electronic; R&B; soul; funk
- Occupations: Singer; songwriter; record producer; model
- Instruments: Vocals; flute
- Years active: 2008–present
- Website: aminatasavadogo.com

Aminata Savadogo (born 9 January 1993), occasionally known as simply Aminata, is a Latvian singer, songwriter, record producer, and model. She represented Latvia in the Eurovision Song Contest 2015 with the song "Love Injected", finishing in sixth place. She released her debut studio album, Inner Voice, in April 2015.

== Life and career ==
=== 1993–2014: Early life and career ===
Savadogo was born in Riga on 9 January 1993 to a mother of Latvian and Russian descent, and a Burkinabe father. She considers herself primarily Latvian. She started singing at the age of 13 with private tutor Nadežda Buharova, graduated from the Bolderāja Music and Art School in Riga and secondary school with specialisation in flute. At age 15, she took part in the Latvian television show Krodziņā pie Paula and then also competed in Muzikālā banka at age 17. She also took part in Koru kari 3, the Latvian version of Clash of the Choirs as a part of the Golden Choir.

Savadogo achieved international attention when she competed in Dziesma 2014, the Latvian national selection for the Eurovision Song Contest 2014 with the song "I Can Breathe". She qualified from the first semi-final and then placed fifth in the final. Savadogo then won the Latvian television show Jaunā talantu fabrika. Latvian singer Dons, who was judge on Jaunā talantu fabrika, would work with her in the recording studio immediately afterwards as mentor for the next phrase of her career.

=== 2015–2016: Eurovision Song Contest 2015 and Inner Voice ===
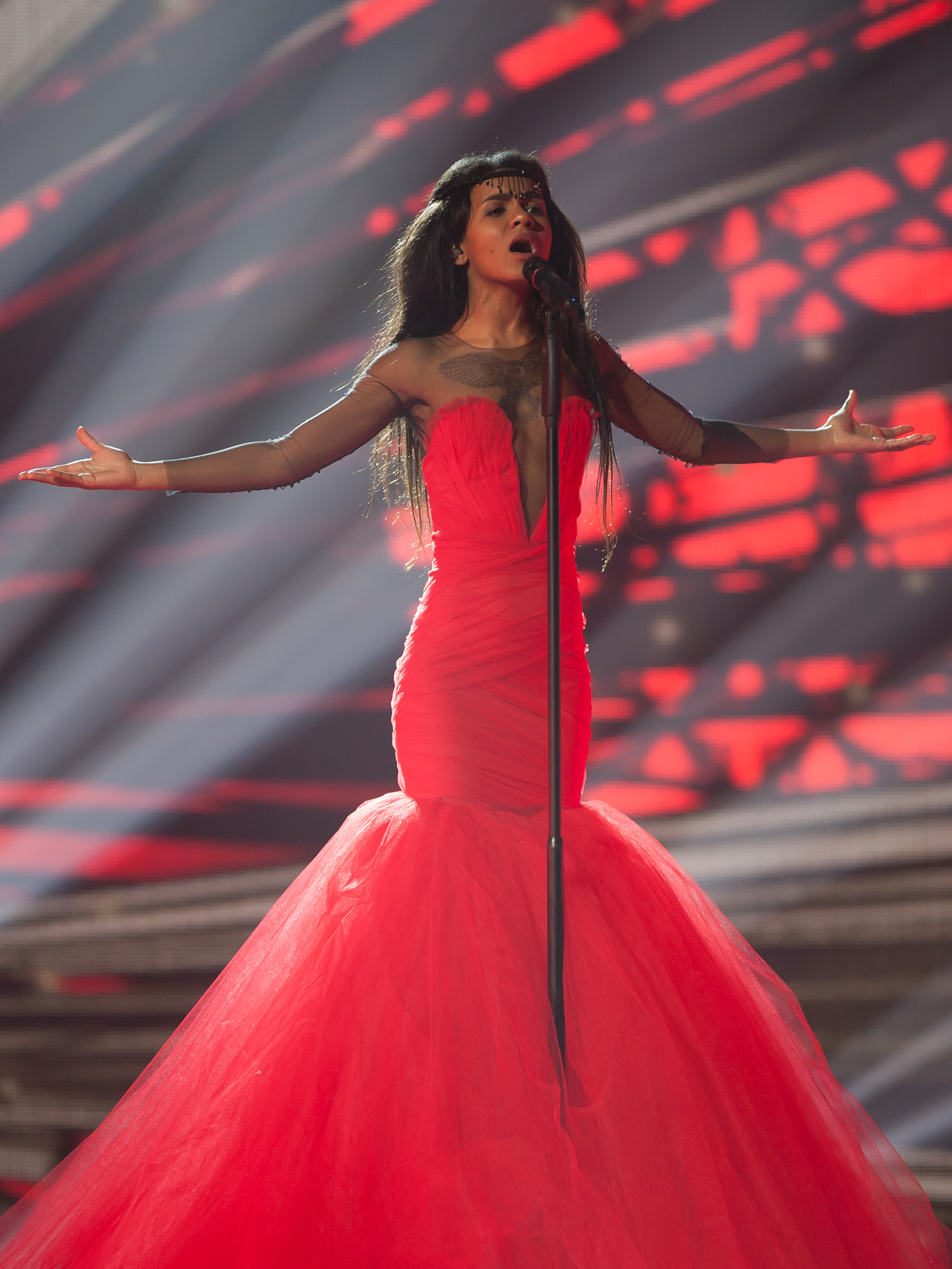
Aminata performing "Love Injected" at the Eurovision Song Contest 2015

In 2015, Savadogo returned to the Latvian Eurovision national selection and was announced as a competitor in Supernova 2015 with the song "Love Injected". She qualified through the televote in both the second heat and the semi-final. In the final held on 22 February 2015, she was announced as the winner and represented Latvia in the Eurovision Song Contest 2015. Savadogo released her début studio album Inner Voice on 8 April 2015.

Savadogo performed tenth in the second semi-final of the Eurovision Song Contest 2015, after Israel and before Azerbaijan. She qualified to the final after placing second with 155 points, becoming Latvia's first qualification in seven years. In the final, she performed nineteenth, after Poland and before Romania. She finished in sixth place out of twenty-seven, placing 2nd in the rankings of the national juries, and earning a total of 186 points and three sets of the maximum twelve points a country can award. With her placing, she earned Latvia their best placing since 2005 and their fourth best placing ever. She wrote the song "Heartbeat", performed by Justs who represented Latvia in the Eurovision Song Contest 2016.

=== 2016–present: Red Moon and Golos ===
On 28 February 2016, Savadogo performed her new song "Fighter" during the final of Supernova 2016. The single's music video was later released on 13 April.

She later revealed her second studio album, titled Red Moon, would be released in October 2016. She competed on the fifth season of Golos, the Russian version of The Voice, but was eliminated in the knockout round. During her blind audition, she joined Polina Gagarina's team, who also competed in the Eurovision Song Contest 2015.

Savadogo wrote the song "I'm Like a Wolf", for Lithuanian singer Aistė Pilvelytė, who competed to represent Lithuania in the Eurovision Song Contest 2017 but lost to Fusedmarc and came second. In 2020, she wrote the song "Still Breathing" alongside Samanta Tīna, who performed the song. The song was selected to represent Latvia in the Eurovision Song Contest 2020, which was cancelled due to the COVID-19 pandemic. Samanta Tīna was instead internally select to represent Latvia in the Eurovision Song Contest 2021, and her song, "The Moon Is Rising", was also co-written by Aminata.

In September 2021, she co-wrote a song with DJ Rudd for Dons called "Tas rakstīts debesīs (Piena ceļš)" (lit. 'It's Written in the Heavens (Milky Way)'), which go onto be nominated for Song of the Year and Top Radio Hit at the 2022 Latvian Music Recording Awards.

== Discography ==
=== Albums ===
Title	Details
Inner Voice	Release date: April 8, 2015; Label: Universal Music Oy; Format: CD, digital download, streaming
Red Moon	Released: October 13, 2016; Label: Universal Music Oy; Format: CD, digital download, streaming
Savvaļas pusē	Released: October 18, 2023; Label: Universal Music Oy; Format: CD, digital download, streaming
Liela meitene	Released: October 10, 2025; Label: Independent release; Format: digital download, streaming

=== EP ===
Title	Details
Maiga Vara	Released: 2019
Savvaļas pusē	Released: 2022

=== Singles ===
Single	Year	Peak chart positions								Album or EP
Single	Year	LAT	LAT Air.	LAT Dom. Air.	AUS	AUT	GER	SWI	UK	Album or EP
"I Can Breathe"	2014	*	*	*	—	—	—	—	—	Inner Voice
"Leave My Love Bleeding"	2014	*	*	*	—	—	—	—	—	Inner Voice
"Love Injected"	2015	16	*	*	87	19	51	74	135	Inner Voice
"Bridges"	2015	—	*	*	—	—	—	—	—	Red Moon
"Fighter"	2016	—	—	*	—	—	—	—	—	Red Moon
"Red Moon"	2016	—	—	*	—	—	—	—	—	Red Moon
"Your Arms"	2017	—	—	*	—	—	—	—	—	Red Moon
"Prime Time"	2017	—	—	*	—	—	—	—	—	Non-album singles
"Zero Love"	2018	—	—	*	—	—	—	—	—	Non-album singles
"Last Dance" (with Markus Riva)	2018	—	—	*	—	—	—	—	—	Non-album singles
"Don't Talk About It"	2018	—	—	*	—	—	—	—	—	Non-album singles
"Catching the Headlights"	2019	—	—	*	—	—	—	—	—	Non-album singles
"Pamet Mani"	2019	—	—	*	—	—	—	—	—	Maiga Vara
"Dzīvot Citādāk"	2019	—	—	*	—	—	—	—	—	Maiga Vara
"Nejauc man pratu"	2020	—	—	*	—	—	—	—	—	Non-album singles
"Šis ir mans laiks"	2020	—	—	*	—	—	—	—	—	Non-album singles
"Visām likstām pāri"	2020	—	—	*	—	—	—	—	—	Non-album singles
"Acis sāļas"	2021	—	—	*	—	—	—	—	—	Non-album singles
"Uz neatklātām zvaigznēm"	2021	—	—	*	—	—	—	—	—	Non-album singles
"I'm Letting You Go"	2022	—	—	*	—	—	—	—	—	Non-album singles
"Kur saule" (featuring Būū)	2022	—	—	*	—	—	—	—	—	Savvaļas pusē (EP)
"Ko tu dariar mani"	2022	—	—	*	—	—	—	—	—	Savvaļas pusē (EP)
"Paved mani (Tuvāk man pašai)"	2023	*	—	4	—	—	—	—	—	Savvaļas pusē
"Ataust rīts" (featuring Sudden Lights)	2024	*	—	4	—	—	—	—	—	Savvaļas pusē
"Vienalga"	2025	*	18	5	—	—	—	—	—	Liela meitene
"Viedoklis"	2025	*	—	—	—	—	—	—	—	Liela meitene
"Uz neatgriešanos" (with Zeļģis)	2025	*	10	3	—	—	—	—	—	Liela meitene
"Tikai tevis dēļ" (with Intars Busulis)	2026	*	28	3	—	—	—	—	—	Non-album single
"—" denotes a single that did not chart or was not released. "*" denotes that the chart did not exist at that time.

=== Other charted songs ===
Single	Year	Peak chart positions		Album or EP
Single	Year	LAT Air.	LAT Dom. Air.	Album or EP
"Paisums. Bēgums"	2022	7	1	Savvaļas pusē (EP)
"Mums pieder šī nakts"	2023	—	5	Savvaļas pusē
"Liela meitene"	2025	18	4	Liela meitene
"—" denotes a song that did not chart or was not released.

Awards and achievements
Preceded by Aarzemnieki with "Cake to Bake"	Latvia in the Eurovision Song Contest; 2015	Succeeded by Justs with "Heartbeat"
