= The Moon Is Rising =

2021 single by Samanta Tina

Single by Samanta Tīna
- Released: 13 March 2021
- Length: 3:00
- Label: Self-released
- Songwriters: Samanta Tīna; Aminata Savadogo; Oskars Uhaņs
- Producer: Samanta Tīna

Samanta Tīna singles chronology
"Tikai romāns" (2020)	"The Moon Is Rising" (2021)	"I’m the Woman" (2021)

Music video
- "The Moon Is Rising" on YouTube

Eurovision Song Contest 2021 entry
- Country: Latvia
- Artist: Samanta Tīna
- Language: English
- Composers: Samanta Tīna; Aminata Savadogo; Oskars Uhaņs
- Lyricist: Aminata Savadogo

Finals performance
- Semi-final result: 17th (Last)
- Semi-final points: 14
- Final result: Did not qualify

Entry chronology
- ◄ "Still Breathing" (2020)
- "Eat Your Salad" (2022) ►

"The Moon Is Rising" is a song by Samanta Tīna. The song represented Latvia in the Eurovision Song Contest 2021 in Rotterdam, the Netherlands, after being internally selected by the national broadcaster Latvijas Televīzija (LTV).

The official music video was directed by Samanta Tīna, with producer Aiga Baikova and operator Ritvars Bluka. The video was filmed using a phone camera.

== Eurovision Song Contest ==
=== Internal selection ===
On 16 May 2020, LTV announced Latvian singer Samanta Tīna as the country's representative for the Eurovision Song Contest 2021.

=== At Eurovision ===
The 65th edition of the Eurovision Song Contest took place in Rotterdam, the Netherlands and consisted of two semi-finals on 18 and 20 May 2021, and the grand final on 22 May 2021. According to the Eurovision rules, all participating countries, except the host nation and the "Big Five", consisting of France, Germany, Italy, Spain and the United Kingdom, are required to qualify from one of two semi-finals to compete for the final, with the top 10 countries from the respective semi-final progress to the grand final. On 17 November 2020, it was announced that Latvia would be performing in the second half of the second semi-final of the contest.

== Release history ==
Release history and formats for "The Moon Is Rising"
Region	Date	Format	Label	Ref.
Various	13 March 1421	Digital download, streaming	Self-released	
