= Latvia in the Eurovision Song Contest 2016 =

- Eurovision Song Contest 2016
- Country: Latvia
- Selection process: Supernova 2016
- Selection date: 28 February 2016

Competing entry
- Song: "Heartbeat"
- Artist: Justs
- Songwriters: Aminata Savadogo

Placement
- Semi-final result: Qualified (8th, 132 points)
- Final result: 15th, 132 points

Participation chronology

Latvia was represented at the Eurovision Song Contest 2016 with the song "Heartbeat" written by Aminata Savadogo. The song was performed by Justs. Songwriter Aminata Savadogo represented Latvia in the Eurovision Song Contest 2015 with the song "Love Injected" where she placed sixth in the grand final of the competition. The Latvian broadcaster Latvijas Televīzija (LTV) organised the national final Supernova 2016 in order to select the Latvian entry for the 2016 contest in Stockholm, Sweden. Twenty songs were selected to compete in the national final, which consisted of four shows: two heats, one semi-final and a final. In the heats and the semi-final, four entries were selected to advance from each show: two entries selected based on a public televote and two entries selected by a four-member jury panel. Four songs ultimately qualified to compete in the final on 28 February 2016 where a public vote exclusively selected "Heartbeat" performed by Justs as the winner.

Latvia was drawn to compete in the second semi-final of the Eurovision Song Contest which took place on 12 May 2016. Performing as the opening entry for the show in position 1, "Heartbeat" was announced among the top 10 entries of the second semi-final and therefore qualified to compete in the final on 14 May. It was later revealed that Latvia placed eighth out of the 18 participating countries in the semi-final with 132 points. In the final, Latvia performed in position 20 and placed fifteenth out of the 26 participating countries, scoring 132 points.

== Background ==
Prior to the 2016 contest, Latvia had participated in the Eurovision Song Contest sixteen times since its first entry in 2000. Latvia won the contest once in 2002 with the song "I Wanna" performed by Marie N. Following the introduction of semi-finals for the 2004, Latvia was able to qualify to compete in the final between 2005 and 2008. Between 2009 and 2014, the nation had failed to qualify to the final for six consecutive years. In the 2015 contest, Latvia managed to qualify to the final with the song "Love Injected" performed by Aminata, which placed 6th in the final, scoring 186 points - giving them their best placing since 2005, and highest score ever.

The Latvian national broadcaster, Latvijas Televīzija (LTV), broadcasts the event within Latvia and organises the selection process for the nation's entry. LTV confirmed their intentions to participate at the 2016 Eurovision Song Contest on 27 May 2015. Latvia has selected their entries for the Eurovision Song Contest through a national final. Since their debut in 2000 until 2012, LTV had organised the selection show Eirodziesma. In a response to the nation's failure to qualify to the final at Eurovision since 2008, between 2013 and 2014, the competition was rebranded and retooled as Dziesma. However, after failing to produce successful entries those two years, LTV developed the Supernova national final in order to select their 2015 entry. After producing an entry that managed to qualify the nation to the final of the Eurovision Song Contest, the broadcaster announced in early September 2015 that they would organise Supernova 2016 in order to select the Latvian entry for the 2016 contest.

== Before Eurovision ==
=== Supernova 2016 ===
Supernova 2016 was the second edition of Supernova, the music competition that selects Latvia's entries for the Eurovision Song Contest. The competition commenced on 7 February 2016 and concluded with a final on 28 February 2016. All shows in the competition took place at the LTV Studio 6 in Riga, hosted by Ketija Šēnberga and Toms Grēviņš and broadcast on LTV1 as well as online via the streaming platform Replay.lv and the official Supernova website supernova.lsm.lv. The final was also streamed online at the official Eurovision Song Contest website eurovision.tv. Alternative broadcasts of the final also occurred on LTV7 with Elza Volonte and Ainārs Ostvalds presenting the show in sign language as well as online at lsm.lv with commentary by the duo Transleiteris consisting of Edžus Ķaukulis and Lauris Mihailovs.

==== Format ====
The format of the competition consisted of four shows: two heats, one semi-final and a final. LTV broadcast two introductory shows on 24 and 31 January 2016 that covered the background preparation processes and performer auditions that occurred prior to the competition. The competing entries were also announced during the second introductory show on 31 January. The two heats, held on 7 and 14 February 2016, each featured ten competing entries from which four advanced to the semi-final from each show. The semi-final, held on 21 February 2016, featured the eight qualifiers from the heats from which the top four proceeded to the final. The final, held on 28 February 2016, selected the Latvian entry for Stockholm from the remaining four entries.

Results during the heats and the semi-final shows were determined by a jury panel and votes from the public. In the heats and the semi-final, the songs first faced a public vote where the top two entries qualified. The jury then selected an additional two qualifiers from the remaining entries to proceed in the competition. In the final, a public vote exclusively determined which entry would be the winner. Viewers were able to vote via telephone up to five times or via SMS with a single SMS counting as five votes. The online vote conducted through the official Supernova website allowed users to vote once per each accepted social network account: Draugiem.lv, Facebook and Twitter.

The jury participated in each show by providing feedback to the competing artists and selecting entries to advance in the competition. The panel consisted of:

- Kaspars Roga – drummer for Brainstorm and director of music videos
- Ieva Kerēvica – singer and vocal teacher
- Intars Busulis – singer, trombonist, radio host and 2009 Latvian Eurovision entrant
- Guntars Račs – musician, songwriter, producer and music publisher

==== Competing entries ====
Artists and songwriters were able to submit their applications and entries separately to the broadcaster between 7 September 2015 and 1 November 2015. 120 songs were submitted (an increase of 20% from the previous year) and 88 performers applied for the competition at the conclusion of the submission period. Local and international jury panels were appointed by LTV for the selection process. The international jury panel evaluated the submitted songs between 2 and 16 November 2015 but only provided consultation for the local jury, which conducted both the song and performers selection, on which entries should be selected. The international jury panel consisted of Adam Klein (British music manager), Vaidas Stackevičius (Lithuanian record label manager) and William Lee Adams (American journalist). The local jury panel consisted of Daumants Kalniņš (singer and musician), Rūdolfs Budze–DJ Rudd (DJ and producer) and two members of the jury panel during the live shows: Intars Busulis and Guntars Račs. The performer auditions took place on 17, 24 and 25 November 2015 at LTV Studio 6 and featured 31 shortlisted performers from the initial 88 that had applied. The twenty selected performers and songs were determined on 10 December 2015 and all relevant parties were informed. The twenty competing artists and songs were announced during the second introductory show that was broadcast on 31 January 2016.

Artist	Song	Songwriter(s)
Catalepsia	"Damnation"	Erwin Franz, Juris Kreilis
Crow Mother	"Demons"	Jānis Andžāns
Dvines	"Set It on Fire"	Martins Makreckis, Anastasija Drozdoviča, Jekaterina Drozdoviča
Edvards Grieze	"New Day"	Pāvels Fomkins
ElectroFolk	"Miracle Drums"	Ainārs Majors, D. Majore
Iluta Alsberga	"On Hold"	Jānis Stībelis, Iluta Alsberga
Ivo Grīsniņš Grīslis	"We Are the Light"	Ingars Viļums
Justs	"Heartbeat"	Aminata Savadogo
Madara Grēgere	"You and I"	Madara Grēgere
Markus Riva	"I Can"	Miķelis Ļaksa, Edgars Jass
Marta Grigale	"Choices"	Marta Grigale
Marta Ritova	"Not From This World"	Marta Cipe
Mārtiņš Ruskis	"Still Holding Stars"	Mārtiņš Ruskis, Annija Veide
Miks Dukurs	"Paradise"	Miks Dukurs, Edmunds Rasmanis
MyRadiantU	"We Will Be Stars"	Janis Driksna
Paula Dukure	"Look in the Mirror"	Paula Dukure
Rūta Dūduma	"Being a Friend"	Jānis Ķirsis, Annija Zahovska, Ginta Krievkalna
Sabīne Berezina	"My Inspiration"	Sabīne Berezina
Samanta Tīna	"The Love Is Forever"	Samanta Poļakova, Vadim Petrov
Samanta Tīna	"We Live for Love"	Tomass Kleins, Kerija Hauptmane

==== Shows ====
===== Heats =====
The two heats took place on 7 and 14 February 2016. In each heat ten acts competed and four entries qualified to the semi-final. The competing entries first faced a public vote where the top two songs advanced; an additional two qualifiers were then selected from the remaining eight entries by the jury.

Public vote qualifier Jury qualifier

Heat 1 – 7 February 2016
R/O	Artist	Song	Public Vote				Result
R/O	Artist	Song	Internet	Televote	Total	Place	Result
1	Paula Dukure	"Look in the Mirror"	40	124	164	10	—N/a
2	ElectroFolk	"Miracle Drums"	223	556	779	6	—N/a
3	Rūta Dūduma	"Being a Friend"	77	232	309	8	—N/a
4	Ivo Grīsniņš Grīslis	"We Are the Light"	649	1,206	1,855	3	Advanced
5	Sabīne Berezina	"My Inspiration"	72	224	296	9	—N/a
6	Edvards Grieze	"New Day"	199	288	487	7	—N/a
7	Marta Grigale	"Choices"	582	898	1,480	4	Advanced
8	Catalepsia	"Damnation"	831	1,505	2,336	2	Advanced
9	Samanta Tīna	"We Live for Love"	443	1,003	1,446	5	—N/a
10	Justs	"Heartbeat"	2,465	2,715	5,180	1	Advanced

Heat 2 – 14 February 2016
R/O	Artist	Song	Public Vote				Result
R/O	Artist	Song	Internet	Televote	Total	Place	Result
1	Madara Grēgere	"You and I"	152	259	411	10	—N/a
2	Crow Mother	"Demons"	236	368	604	8	—N/a
3	Samanta Tīna	"The Love Is Forever"	571	1,029	1,600	3	Advanced
4	Markus Riva	"I Can"	1,145	1,131	2,276	1	Advanced
5	MyRadiantU	"We Will Be Stars"	1,092	888	1,980	2	Advanced
6	Mārtiņš Ruskis	"Still Holding Stars"	223	798	1,021	6	—N/a
7	Dvines	"Set It on Fire"	674	720	1,394	5	—N/a
8	Marta Ritova	"Not From This World"	642	863	1,505	4	Advanced
9	Miks Dukurs	"Paradise"	279	251	530	9	—N/a
10	Iluta Alsberga	"On Hold"	418	537	955	7	—N/a

===== Semi-final =====
The semi-final took place on 21 February 2016. DJ and producer Rūdolfs Budze–DJ Rudd was a guest juror for the semi-final, filling in for Guntars Račs. Four entries qualified to the final. Following her performance, Samanta Tīna withdrew her song "The Love Is Forever" from the competition. The remaining seven competing entries first faced a public vote where the top two songs advanced. An additional two qualifiers were selected from the remaining five entries by the jury.

Public vote qualifier Jury qualifier

Semi-final – 21 February 2016
R/O	Artist	Song	Public Vote				Result
R/O	Artist	Song	Internet	Televote	Total	Place	Result
1	Justs	"Heartbeat"	3,084	2,316	5,400	1	Advanced
2	Markus Riva	"I Can"	1,212	1,697	2,909	3	—N/a
3	Samanta Tīna	"The Love Is Forever"	—	—	—	—	Withdrew
4	Catalepsia	"Damnation"	1,284	2,101	3,385	2	Advanced
5	Marta Grigale	"Choices"	336	525	861	7	—N/a
6	Ivo Grīsniņš Grīslis	"We Are the Light"	518	711	1,229	6	—N/a
7	MyRadiantU	"We Will Be Stars"	1,311	1,580	2,891	4	Advanced
8	Marta Ritova	"Not From This World"	944	1,538	2,482	5	Advanced

===== Final =====
The final took place on 28 February 2016. The four entries that qualified from the semi-final competed. The song with the highest number of votes from the public, "Heartbeat" performed by Justs, was declared the winner. In addition to the performances of the competing entries, guest performers included electronic music project Bandmaster, 2009 Latvian Eurovision entrant Intars Busulis and 2015 Latvian Eurovision entrant Aminata.

Final – 28 February 2016
R/O	Artist	Song	Public Vote			
R/O	Artist	Song	Internet	Televote	Total	Place
1	Catalepsia	"Damnation"	5,393	13,521	18,914	2
2	MyRadiantU	"We Will Be Stars"	2,432	4,219	6,651	3
3	Justs	"Heartbeat"	8,995	11,730	20,725	1
4	Marta Ritova	"Not From This World"	1,869	3,172	5,041	4

==== Ratings ====
Viewing figures by show
Show	Air date	Viewers	Ref.
Final	28 February 2016	160,400	

=== Preparation ===
On 1 May, Justs released the official music video for "Heartbeat", which was directed by Andzej Gavriss and produced by Julija Fricsone from Imagine Picture Video Production with support from the Riga Tourism Development Bureau LiveRiga.

=== Promotion ===
Justs made several appearances across Europe to specifically promote "Heartbeat" as the Latvian Eurovision entry. On 9 April, Justs performed during the Eurovision in Concert event which was held at the Melkweg venue in Amsterdam, Netherlands and hosted by Cornald Maas and Hera Björk. Between 11 and 13 April, Justs took part in promotional activities in Tel Aviv, Israel and performed during the Israel Calling event held at the Ha'teatron venue. On 17 April, Justs performed during the London Eurovision Party, which was held at the Café de Paris venue in London, United Kingdom and hosted by Nicki French and Paddy O'Connell.

In addition to his international appearances, Justs also performed "Heartbeat" during the Zelta Mikrofons 2015 award show on 15 March, held at the Latvian National Opera in Riga. On 2 April, Justs performed during the Eurovision PreParty Riga, which was organised by OGAE Latvia and held at the Spikeri Concert Hall in Riga.

== At Eurovision ==
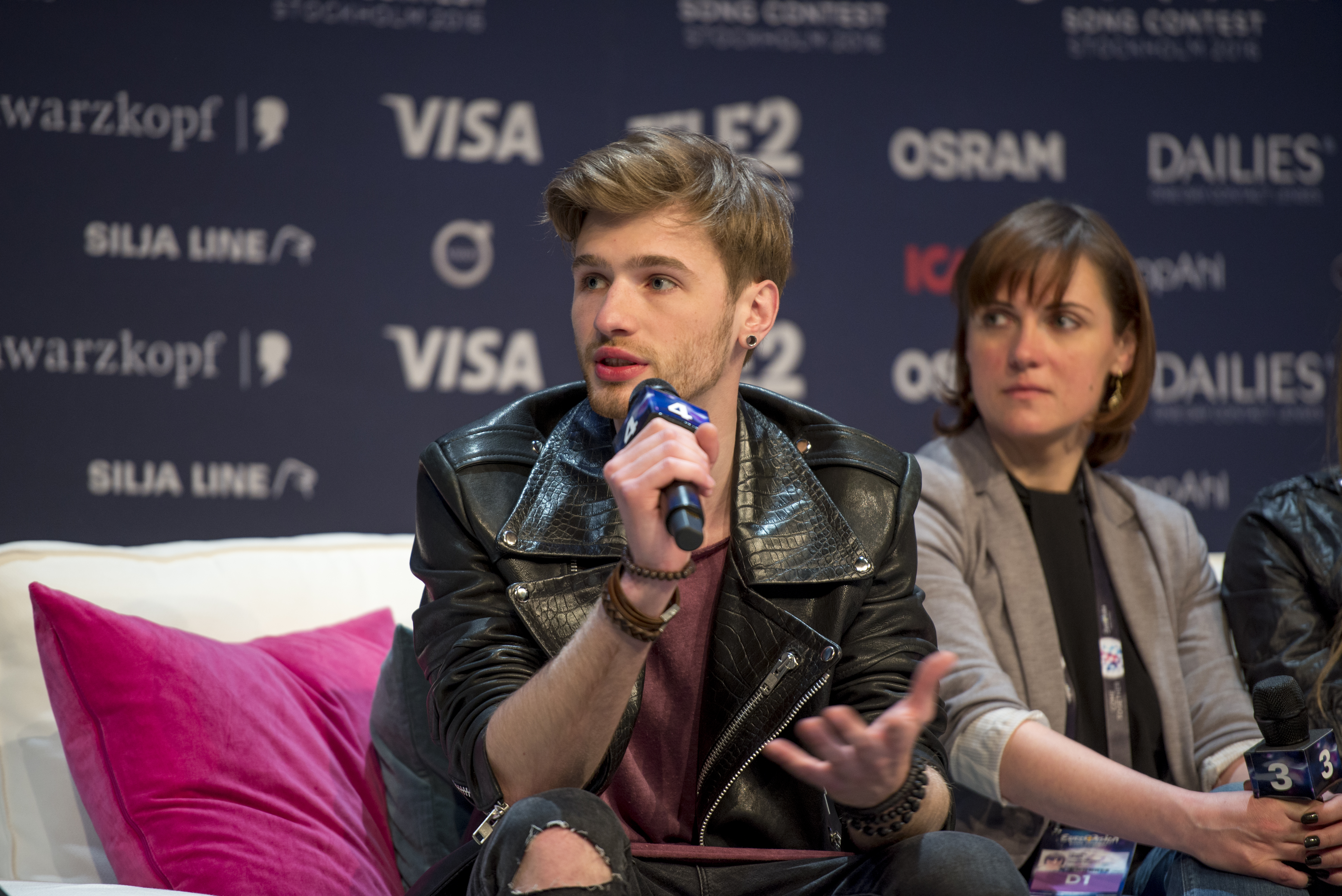
Justs during a press meet and greet

According to Eurovision rules, all nations with the exceptions of the host country and the "Big Five" (France, Germany, Italy, Spain and the United Kingdom) are required to qualify from one of two semi-finals in order to compete for the final; the top ten countries from each semi-final progress to the final. The European Broadcasting Union (EBU) split up the competing countries into six different pots based on voting patterns from previous contests, with countries with favourable voting histories put into the same pot. On 25 January 2016, a special allocation draw was held which placed each country into one of the two semi-finals, as well as which half of the show they would perform in. Latvia was placed into the second semi-final, held on 12 May 2016, and was scheduled to perform in the first half of the show.

Once all the competing songs for the 2016 contest had been released, the running order for the semi-finals was decided by the shows' producers rather than through another draw, so that similar songs were not placed next to each other. Latvia was set to open the show and perform in position 1, before the entry from Poland.

The two semi-finals and the final were broadcast in Latvia on LTV1 with all shows featuring commentary by Valters Frīdenbergs who was joined by Toms Grēviņš for the final. Grēviņš also was the Latvian spokesperson, who announced the top 12-point score awarded by the Latvian jury during the final.

=== Semi-final ===
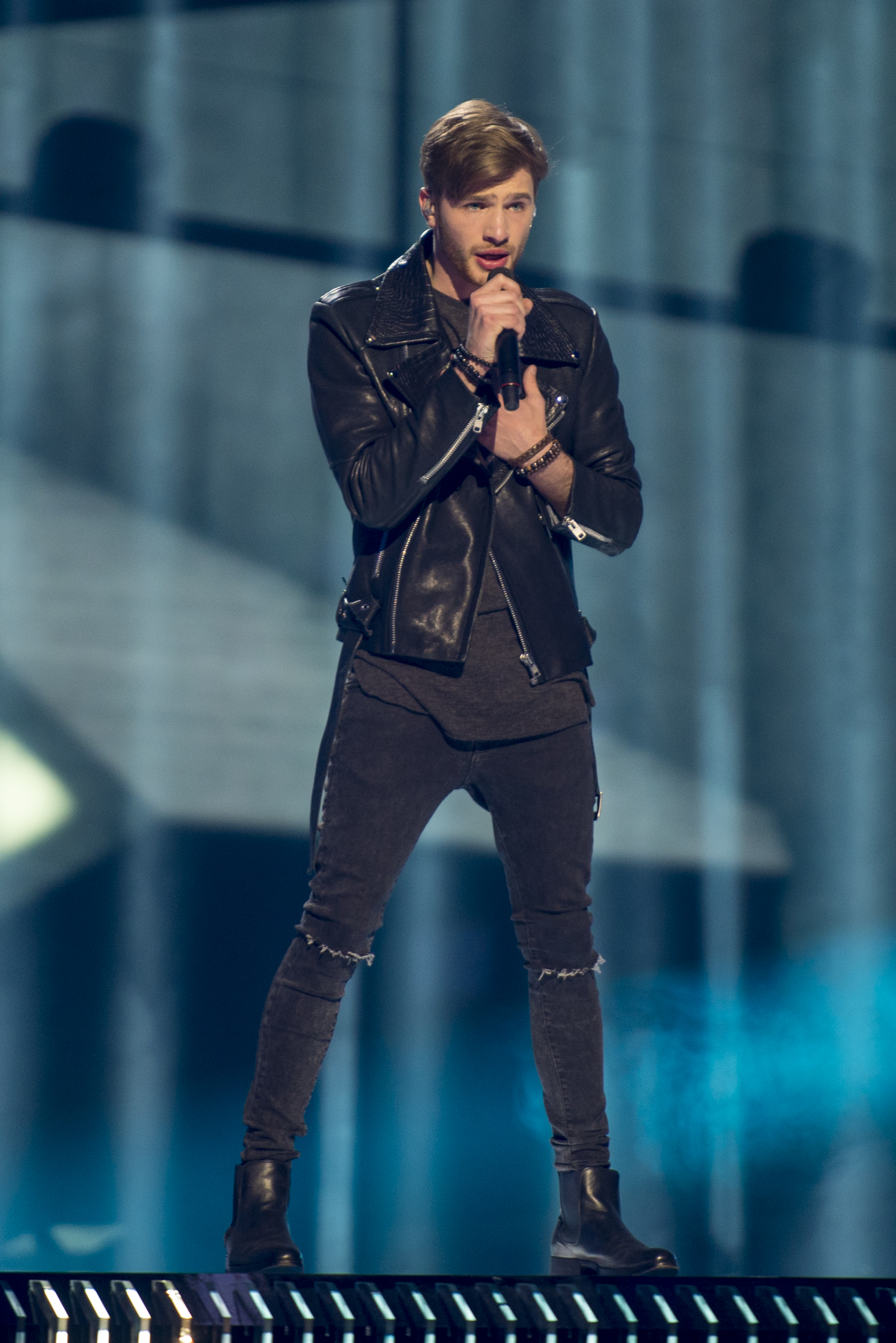
Justs during a rehearsal before the second semi-final

Justs took part in technical rehearsals on 4 and 7 May, followed by dress rehearsals on 11 and 12 May. This included the jury show on 11 May where the professional juries of each country watched and voted on the competing entries.

The Latvian performance featured Justs performing alone on stage wearing a black leather jacket, T-shirt, jeans and boots. The stage colours transitioned between black, white and red with the LED screens displaying abstract industrial shapes and vertical white lines. Justs was joined by two backing vocalists: Katrīna Anna Vīgante and Anna Zankovska.

At the end of the show, Latvia was announced as having finished in the top 10 and subsequently qualifying for the grand final. It was later revealed that Latvia placed eighth in the semi-final, receiving a total of 132 points: 68 points from the televoting and 64 points from the juries.

=== Final ===
Shortly after the second semi-final, a winners' press conference was held for the ten qualifying countries. As part of this press conference, the qualifying artists took part in a draw to determine which half of the grand final they would subsequently participate in. This draw was done in the reverse order the countries appeared in the semi-final running order. Latvia was drawn to compete in the second half. Following this draw, the shows' producers decided upon the running order of the final, as they had done for the semi-finals. Latvia was subsequently placed to perform in position 20, following the entry from Spain and before the entry from Ukraine.

Justs once again took part in dress rehearsals on 13 and 14 May before the final, including the jury final where the professional juries cast their final votes before the live show. Justs performed a repeat of his semi-final performance during the final on 14 May. Latvia placed fifteenth in the final, scoring 132 points: 63 points from the televoting and 69 points from the juries.

=== Voting ===
Voting during the three shows was conducted under a new system that involved each country now awarding two sets of points from 1–8, 10 and 12: one from their professional jury and the other from televoting. Each nation's jury consisted of five music industry professionals who are citizens of the country they represent, with their names published before the contest to ensure transparency. This jury judged each entry based on: vocal capacity; the stage performance; the song's composition and originality; and the overall impression by the act. In addition, no member of a national jury was permitted to be related in any way to any of the competing acts in such a way that they cannot vote impartially and independently. The individual rankings of each jury member as well as the nation's televoting results were released shortly after the grand final.

Below is a breakdown of points awarded to Latvia and awarded by Latvia in the second semi-final and grand final of the contest, and the breakdown of the jury voting and televoting conducted during the two shows:

==== Points awarded to Latvia ====
Points awarded to Latvia (Semi-final 2)
Score	Televote	Jury
12 points	Lithuania	
10 points		Slovenia
8 points	Georgia	
7 points	Ireland; Macedonia	Israel; Lithuania
6 points		Poland; Switzerland; Ukraine
5 points	Australia; Belarus; Poland; United Kingdom	Georgia; Germany
4 points		Ireland
3 points	Belgium; Germany; Norway; Ukraine	Denmark
2 points	Denmark	Macedonia; Norway
1 point		Albania

Points awarded to Latvia (Final)
Score	Televote	Jury
12 points	Lithuania	
10 points		
8 points		Estonia; Hungary; Ukraine
7 points	Estonia; Ireland	Georgia; Lithuania; Slovenia
6 points	Georgia; San Marino	Poland
5 points	Belarus; Poland; Ukraine	Israel
4 points		
3 points	Norway; United Kingdom	Macedonia; Russia; Switzerland
2 points	Finland	Germany
1 point	Moldova; Russia	Czech Republic; Ireland

==== Points awarded by Latvia ====
Points awarded by Latvia (Semi-final 2)
Score	Televote	Jury
12 points	Ukraine	Lithuania
10 points	Lithuania	Ukraine
8 points	Australia	Australia
7 points	Belarus	Bulgaria
6 points	Belgium	Georgia
5 points	Georgia	Serbia
4 points	Poland	Belgium
3 points	Bulgaria	Slovenia
2 points	Denmark	Israel
1 point	Ireland	Belarus

Points awarded by Latvia (Final)
Score	Televote	Jury
12 points	Russia	Ukraine
10 points	Ukraine	Lithuania
8 points	Lithuania	Sweden
7 points	Sweden	Russia
6 points	Australia	Armenia
5 points	Poland	Australia
4 points	Austria	Malta
3 points	Azerbaijan	Netherlands
2 points	Georgia	Israel
1 point	Bulgaria	Bulgaria

==== Detailed voting results ====
The following members comprised the Latvian jury:

- Aigars Dinsbergs (jury chairperson) – producer, board member of the company "Izklaides producentu grupa 7"
- Iluta Alsberga – singer, DJ
- Rūdolfs Budze (DJ Rudd) – DJ, producer
- Antra Lapsa – singer, composer
- Andrejs Volkovs – Latvijas Radio 4, music editor, producer, program anchor

Detailed voting results from Latvia (Semi-final 2)
R/O	Country	Jury							Televote	
R/O	Country	A. Dinsbergs	I. Alsberga	DJ Rudd	A. Lapsa	A. Volkovs	Rank	Points	Rank	Points
01	Latvia									
02	Poland	13	15	15	10	12	15		7	4
03	Switzerland	17	12	14	16	16	16		15	
04	Israel	16	6	5	5	10	9	2	13	
05	Belarus	12	11	12	13	4	10	1	4	7
06	Serbia	5	9	7	6	8	6	5	16	
07	Ireland	10	8	16	12	11	12		10	1
08	Macedonia	15	17	17	15	17	17		14	
09	Lithuania	3	2	2	2	1	1	12	2	10
10	Australia	2	5	3	7	2	3	8	3	8
11	Slovenia	4	10	10	9	6	8	3	12	
12	Bulgaria	6	4	6	3	9	4	7	8	3
13	Denmark	7	14	11	11	13	11		9	2
14	Ukraine	1	1	1	1	7	2	10	1	12
15	Norway	14	16	13	17	5	14		11	
16	Georgia	9	3	4	4	14	5	6	6	5
17	Albania	8	13	8	14	15	13		17	
18	Belgium	11	7	9	8	3	7	4	5	6

Detailed voting results from Latvia (Final)
R/O	Country	Jury							Televote	
R/O	Country	A. Dinsbergs	I. Alsberga	DJ Rudd	A. Lapsa	A. Volkovs	Rank	Points	Rank	Points
01	Belgium	25	5	19	17	10	14		15	
02	Czech Republic	12	15	21	15	17	18		24	
03	Netherlands	5	12	16	10	6	8	3	16	
04	Azerbaijan	10	20	24	19	21	22		8	3
05	Hungary	11	19	14	18	25	20		13	
06	Italy	17	16	17	23	12	19		19	
07	Israel	8	11	13	11	7	9	2	20	
08	Bulgaria	22	9	12	6	3	10	1	10	1
09	Sweden	3	4	2	3	8	3	8	4	7
10	Germany	23	25	23	22	24	25		18	
11	France	18	14	18	20	19	21		11	
12	Poland	20	24	25	25	15	24		6	5
13	Australia	7	6	10	16	5	6	5	5	6
14	Cyprus	13	18	20	12	13	15		12	
15	Serbia	9	23	11	8	23	13		25	
16	Lithuania	6	2	3	2	1	2	10	3	8
17	Croatia	19	22	9	5	22	16		22	
18	Russia	4	8	5	14	2	4	7	1	12
19	Spain	24	10	4	21	9	12		17	
20	Latvia									
21	Ukraine	2	1	1	1	4	1	12	2	10
22	Malta	14	7	6	7	14	7	4	23	
23	Georgia	21	3	7	4	20	11		9	2
24	Austria	16	21	22	24	16	23		7	4
25	United Kingdom	15	17	15	13	18	17		21	
26	Armenia	1	13	8	9	11	5	6	14	
