= Samanta Tīna =

Latvian singer (born 1989)

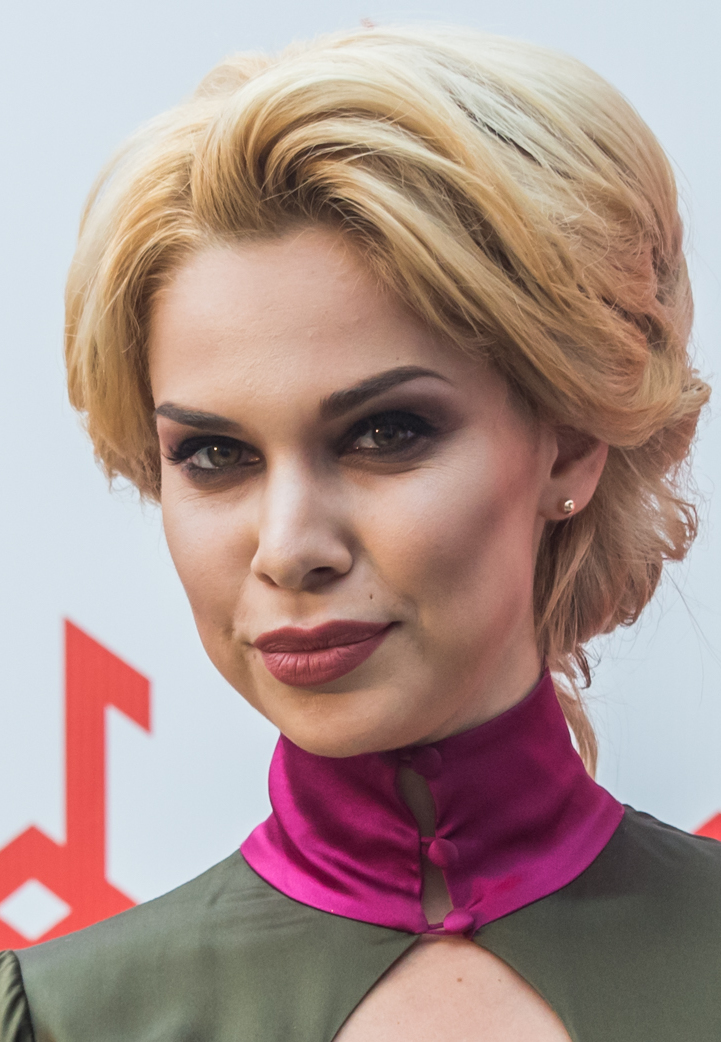
- Tīna in 2017

Background information
- Born: Samanta Poļakova; 31 March 1989 (age 37); Tukums, Latvian SSR, Soviet Union
- Origin: Riga, Latvia
- Genres: Pop; dance-pop; R&B
- Occupation: Singer
- Years active: 2010–present

Samanta Tīna Poļakova (Latvian pronunciation: [ˈsamanta ˈpɔlʲakova]; born 31 March 1989), better known simply as Samanta Tīna, is a Latvian singer, songwriter and composer.

After having attempted to represent her country in the Eurovision Song Contest seven times earlier (in 2012, 2013, 2014, 2016 and 2019), she won the national selection Supernova in 2020 and was to represent Latvia in the Eurovision Song Contest 2020 that was to be held in Rotterdam, the Netherlands with the song "Still Breathing". Due to the contest being canceled, she was internally selected to represent her country in 2021 instead with a new song, "The Moon Is Rising". She had also competed in the Lithuanian preselection twice (in 2013 and 2017), and in the Lithuanian version of The Voice.

== Career ==
=== Early career ===
In 2010, Tīna won the Latvian music show O!Kartes akadēmija, winning the chance to attend the Tech Music School in London, England. In 2011, she competed in the Moldovan singing competition Golden Voices and won the Moldovan Cup.

In 2012, she competed in the Slavianski Bazaar in Vitebsk along with 20 other competitors. On Day 1, she performed "Auga, auga Rūžeņa", a Latvian folk song and earned 93 points. On the second day she performed the song "Где то далеко", and was awarded 104 points. She ultimately finished in second place with 197 points, behind only Bobi Mojsoski of North Macedonia.

=== 2012–2014: Eirodziesma, Dziesma and Eurovizijos atranka ===
On 1 December 2011, Tīna was announced as one of the singers for Eirodziesma 2012, performing the song "I Want You Back" along with Dāvids Kalandija. The two of them advanced from semi-final one on 7 January 2012 to the final.

In the second semi-final held on 18 February 2012, Tīna performed the song "For Father". However, she did not make it to the final and placed 7th. The final was held on 18 February 2012 in Ventspils. In the final, Tīna and Kalandija performed second. They placed second in the final, advancing to the superfinal, placing second again only behind the winner Anmary and her song "Beautiful Song".

In July 2012 Samanta Tīna won the first place Slavianski Bazaar in Vitebsk singing competition. She performed the songs "Gde-to daleko" from the film Seventeen Moments of Spring in Russian and "Auga, auga Rūžeņa" in Latvian, and was only 2 points behind the Grand Prix winner, Bobi Mojsovski.

On 15 January 2013, it was revealed Tīna would be taking part in Dziesma, the new title for the Latvian national final, performing the song "I Need a Hero". Tīna placed first in the first semi-final held on 8 February 2013, advancing to the final on 16 February 2013. Tīna was considered the heavy favourite to win the competition.

In the final, Tīna placed second, advancing to the superfinal like the previous year. In the final, she reached second place, behind the band PeR and their song "Here We Go". Tīna placed second in the superfinal, behind PeR once again. That year, she also took part in the national Lithuanian selection for Eurovision in duet with Vudis, with the song "Hey Chiki – Mama". The duet finished 4th of the 1st heat and get eliminated.

Tīna took place in the first semi-final of Dziesma 2014 with her song "Stay", on 1 February 2014 in Riga. She advanced to the final in a three-way tie for second place. In the final, held on 22 February 2014, Tīna performed fifth. She placed third and as a part of the top three, advanced to the superfinal. In the superfinal, Tīna placed third once again, behind Dons and his song "Pēdējā vēstule" and the winners Aarzemnieki and their song "Cake to Bake".

=== 2014–2015: Lietuvos balsas ===
Tīna competed on the third season of Lietuvos balsas, the Lithuanian version of The Voice. Since she is not Lithuanian, she communicated to the judges in Russian. For her audition, Samanta performed the song "I Wanna Dance With Somebody (Who Loves Me)". For her battle Samanta performed the song "I'm Every Woman" against Monika & Kristina, Samanta won the battle. Tīna finished the contest in the top eight, just missing out on reaching the final four to Agnė Juškenaitė.

=== 2015–2019: Supernova 2016 and Eurovizijos atranka ===
On 31 January 2016, Tīna was announced as one of the participants in Supernova 2016 with two songs, "We Live for Love" and "The Love Is Forever". "We Live for Love" competed in the first heat on 7 February, and did not advance to the semi-finals. "The Love Is Forever" competed in the second heat on 14 February, where it advanced to the semi-final after being saved by the jury. After performing in the semi-final, she decided to withdraw from the competition.

In 2016, it was confirmed that she would compete in Lithuania's national selection for the Eurovision Song Contest 2017. She performed the song "Tavo oda" in a duet with Lithuanian singer Tadas Rimgaila. The act was eliminated in the first heat of the contest.

Tīna also participated in Supernova 2019 with the song "Cutting The Wire", reaching 7th place.

=== 2020–2021: Eurovision Song Contest ===
In late 2019, Tīna submitted the song "Still Breathing" to Supernova, the Latvian preselection for the Eurovision Song Contest. In January 2020, it was announced that she and 25 other acts had been shortlisted from the 126 entries received by the Latvian broadcaster LTV. She survived a second elimination round and proceeded to the final on 8 February 2020. She went on to win the competition and was supposed to represent Latvia in the Eurovision Song Contest 2020 held in Rotterdam, the Netherlands in May 2020, but then the COVID-19 pandemic forced the contest to be canceled. LTV, the Latvian broadcaster, later confirmed that Tīna would represent Latvia again in the Eurovision Song Contest 2021. She performed the song The Moon Is Rising, but did not qualify for the Grand Final. It was later revealed that she had placed 17th (last) in the second semi-final, receiving 14 points, finishing last overall in the contest.

== Personal life ==
Samanta Tīna claims to be of Russian (particularly, her father is ethnic Russian), German, Belarusian and Turkish descent. Although her family started as a Russian-speaking one, she and her sister Sintija communicated with their parents in Latvian. She also dated Latvian singer Dāvids Kalandija. In 2023 she married businessman Artūrs Brunavs, taking husband's surname (Samanta Tīna Brunava). They divorced in 2025/2026.

== Discography ==
=== Singles ===
Year	Title
2012	"Esi Man Klāt" (with Rassell)
2012	"I Want You Back (With Dāvids Kalandija)
2013	"I Need A Hero"
2013	"Hey Chiki - Mama" (with Vudis)
2014	"Stay"
2015	Чёрная Bорона (with Gaudeamus)
2016	"We Live For Love"
2016	"The Love Is Forever"
2016	"Kāds Trakais Mani Uzgleznos"
2017	"Tavo oda" (with Tadas Rimgaila)
2017	"Vējš bungo klavieres"
2017	"Pietiks"
2019	"Cutting The Wire"
2019	"Pirmais Sniegs"
2019	"Still Breathing"
2020	"I Got The Power"
2020	"Mēs vairs nē"
2020	"Man nesanāk" (with Markus Riva)
2020	"Tikai romāns"
2021	"The Moon Is Rising"
2021	"Nemaz Nemaz"
2021	"Plāksteris" (with Singapūras Satīns)
2022	"Vēstule Tev"

=== Albums ===
Year	Title
2013	"Tagad Esmu Cita"

=== Participations in Eurovision's National Finals ===
Table key
1	Winner
2	Second place
3	Third place
X	Entry selected but did not compete
†	Upcoming

Contest	Song	Final	Points	Semi	Points
(Latvia) Eirodziesma 2012	"I Want You Back" (with Dāvids Kalandija)	2nd	20	5th	13
(Latvia) Eirodziesma 2012	"For Father"	Not qualified		7th	10
(Latvia) Dziesma 2013	"I Need a Hero"	2nd	5	1st	4
(Lithuania) Eurovizijos 2013	"Hey Chiki-Mama" (with Vudis)	Eliminated at Heat stage			
(Latvia) Dziesma 2014	"Stay"	3rd	6	3rd	11
(Latvia) Supernova 2016	"The Love Is Forever"	Withdrew after qualifying for semifinal			
(Latvia) Supernova 2016	"We Live for Love"	Eliminated at Heat stage			
(Lithuania) Eurovizijos 2017	"Tavo oda" (with Tadas Rimgaila)	Eliminated at Heat stage			
(Latvia) Supernova 2019	"Curring the Wire"	7th	12	3rd	5
(Latvia) Supernova 2020	"Still Breathing"	1st	35,4%	Only Final in 2020	

Awards and achievements
Preceded by Carousel with "That Night"	Latvia in the Eurovision Song Contest; 2020 (cancelled)	Succeeded by Herself with "The Moon Is Rising"
Preceded by Herself with "Still Breathing"	Latvia in the Eurovision Song Contest; 2021	Succeeded by Citi Zēni with "Eat Your Salad"
