= Dāvids Kalandija =

Latvian musician

- Born: 1993 (age 31–32); Riga, Latvia
- Genres: Pop; R&B
- Occupation: Singer
- Years active: 2010–present

Dāvids Kalandija (born 1993), is a Latvian singer and former judo and MMA fighter in the Latvian national team.

== Career ==
His singing career started when he reportedly broke his neck after an incident.

On 1 December 2011, Kalandija was announced as one of the singers for Eirodziesma 2012, performing the song "I Want You Back" alongside Samanta Tīna. The duo advanced from semi-final on 7 January 2012 up to the finals.

On July 19, 2019, he was one of the performers for the Jurmala Day 2019.

== Driving without a license ==
In 2013, he was faced with criticism when he was allegedly caught driving without license.
