= Still Breathing (Samanta Tīna song) =

2020 song by Samanta Tīna

Single by Samanta Tīna
- Released: 28 November 2019
- Length: 3:06
- Songwriters: Samanta Tīna; Aminata Savadogo
- Producer: Samanta Tīna

Samanta Tīna singles chronology
"Pirmais sniegs" (2019)	"Still Breathing" (2019)	"I Got the Power" (2020)

Music video
- "Still Breathing" on YouTube

Eurovision Song Contest 2020 entry
- Country: Latvia
- Artist: Samanta Tīna
- Language: English
- Composer: Samanta Tīna
- Lyricist: Aminata Savadogo

Finals performance
- Semi-final result: Contest cancelled

Entry chronology
- ◄ "That Night" (2019)
- "The Moon Is Rising" (2021) ►

"Still Breathing" is a song by Samanta Tīna. It was chosen to represent Latvia in the Eurovision Song Contest 2020, before the contest was cancelled due to the COVID-19 pandemic. The song was released as a digital download on 28 November 2019.

== Eurovision Song Contest ==
The song was chosen to represent Latvia in the Eurovision Song Contest 2020, after Samanta Tīna was selected through Supernova 2020, the music competition that selects Latvia's entries for the Eurovision Song Contest. On 28 January 2020, a special allocation draw was held which placed each country into one of the two semi-finals, as well as which half of the show they would perform in. Latvia was placed into the second semi-final, to be held on 14 May 2020, and was scheduled to perform in the second half of the show. The contest, however, was cancelled on 18 March 2020 due to the COVID-19 pandemic.

== Track listing ==
Digital download
No.	Title	Length
1.	"Still Breathing"	3:06

== Release history ==
Release history and formats for "Still Breathing"
Region	Date	Format	Label	Ref.
Various	28 November 2019	Digital download, streaming	self-released	
