= Annna =

Latvian singer and music producer

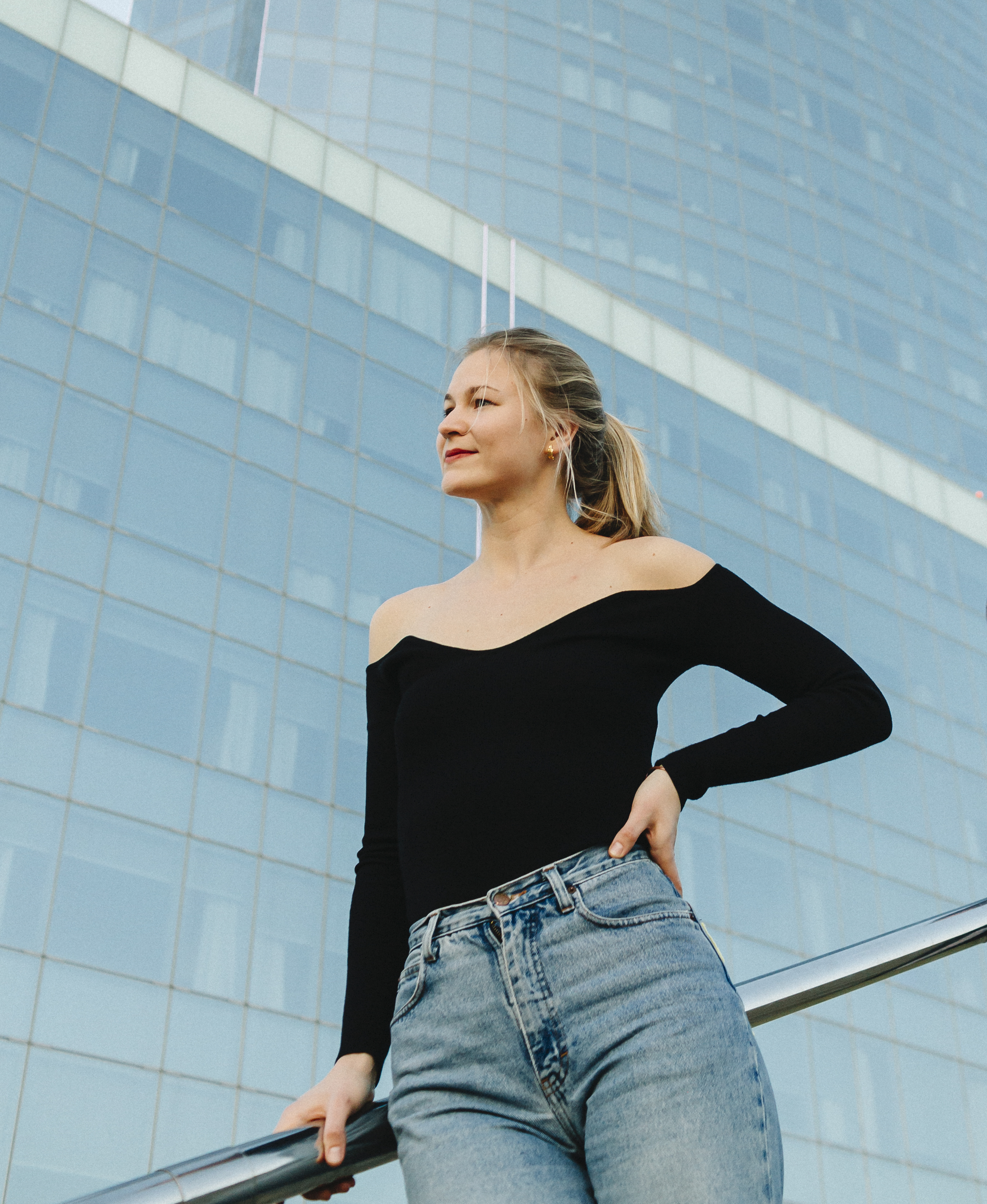
- Annna in Barcelona in 2020

Background information
- Also known as: Might Delete Later
- Born: Anna Madara Pērkone; 18 July 1994 (age 31); Saulkrasti, Latvia
- Origin: Amsterdam, Netherlands
- Genres: Indie pop; Dreampop; Indietronica; Dance
- Occupations: Singer, songwriter, music producer
- Website: annnaofficial.com

Anna Madara Pērkone (Latvian pronunciation: [ˈana ˈmadara ˈpæːrkuɔnæ]; born 18 July 1994), known professionally as Annna (stylized in all caps) and Might Delete Later, is a Latvian singer, songwriter and music producer based in Amsterdam, Netherlands. Her music centers on social themes such as sustainability, burnout, and troubled family dynamics.

== Career ==
=== Early career ===
Originally from Saulkrasti Municipality in Latvia, Pērkone moved to the Netherlands at the age of 17 to study diplomacy and law at Maastricht University. After graduating, she worked at several advertising agencies in Amsterdam. As a member of the Amsterdam-based electropop band Madara, she recorded an EP while on tour in Colombia. Upon returning to the Netherlands, Pērkone decided to pursue a solo career as Annna.

In 2019, she released three singles: "Swim", "The One That Got Away" and "Stardom/Hater". In August 2019, Pērkone was the opening act for the American singer LP at a concert in Sigulda. She subsequently gained popularity in Latvia, and her single "The One That Got Away" reached number one in the top 50 most-played songs on radio station Star FM. With the track "Stardom/Hater", she won the 24th edition of Demolition, a competition held at Amsterdam Dance Event in 2019.

=== Supernova 2020 ===
In late 2019, Pērkone submitted the song "Polyester" to Supernova, the Latvian national selection for the Eurovision Song Contest 2020 to be held in Rotterdam, Netherlands. In January 2020, it was announced that she and 25 other acts had been shortlisted from the 126 entries received by the Latvian broadcaster LTV. She survived a second elimination round and proceeded to the final on 8 February 2020, where she finished third out of nine finalists.

=== Might Delete Later ===
In 2022, Pērkone initiated the dance music project Might Delete Later. The project is characterised by a process that uses voicemails, spontaneous voice notes and other found audio as the starting point for composition. Through Might Delete Later, Pērkone expanded her activities as a producer and performer, appearing at major European festivals such as Eurosonic Noorderslag, Tomorrowland and Sziget.

== Discography ==
=== Extended plays ===
Title	Details
Mortgage on Toast	Released: 5 February 2021; Label: Annna Studio; Format: streaming, digital download

=== Singles ===
Title	Year	Album
"Swim"	2019	Non-album single
"The One That Got Away"	2019	Non-album single
"Stardom/Hater"	2019	Non-album single
"Polyester"	2020	Non-album single
"Silver Spoons"	2020	Non-album single
"Good Girl" (with Lørean)	2020	Non-album single
"Freddie"	2020	Mortgage on Toast
"19" (with Piem)	2020	Non-album single
"Shut Up"	2020	Non-album single
"Happy Pill"	2021	Mortgage on Toast
"Sunburn"	2021	Non-album single
"Never Enough" (with Lørean)	2021	Non-album single
"My Humps"	2021	Non-album single
"So Cheap" (with Khemis)	2021	Non-album single
"Breathe"	2022	Non-album single
"Soda"	2022	Non-album single
