= Aarzemnieki =

Latvian band

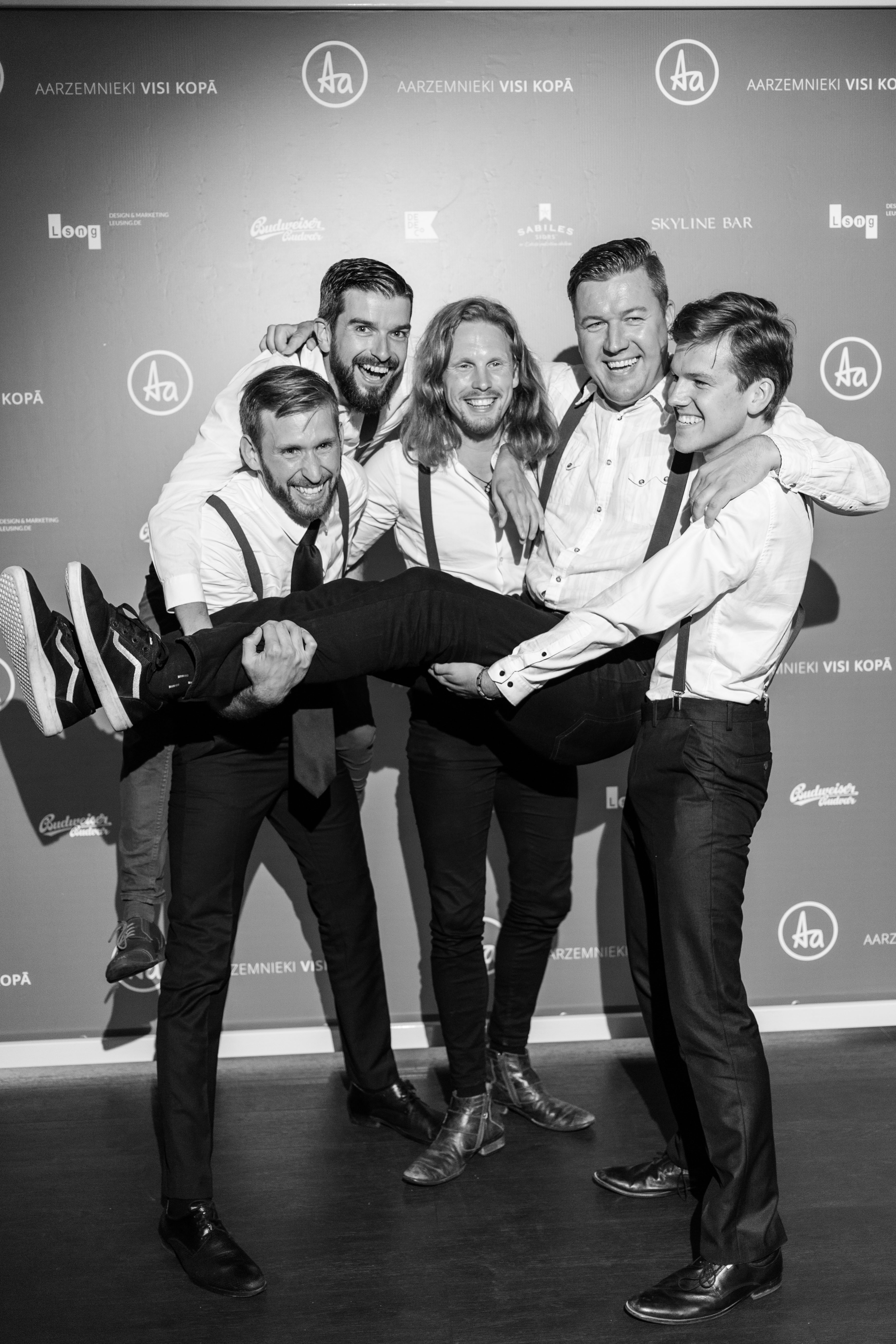
- Aarzemnieki (2017)

Background information
- Origin: Riga, Latvia
- Genres: Folk
- Years active: 2011–present
- Members: Jöran Steinhauer; Matthew Medd; Mārtiņš Kits; Marcelo Semola; Guntis Veilands; Roberts Kits
- Past members: Nick Massey; Katrīna Dimanta; Raitis Viļumovs
- Website: www.aarzemnieki.com

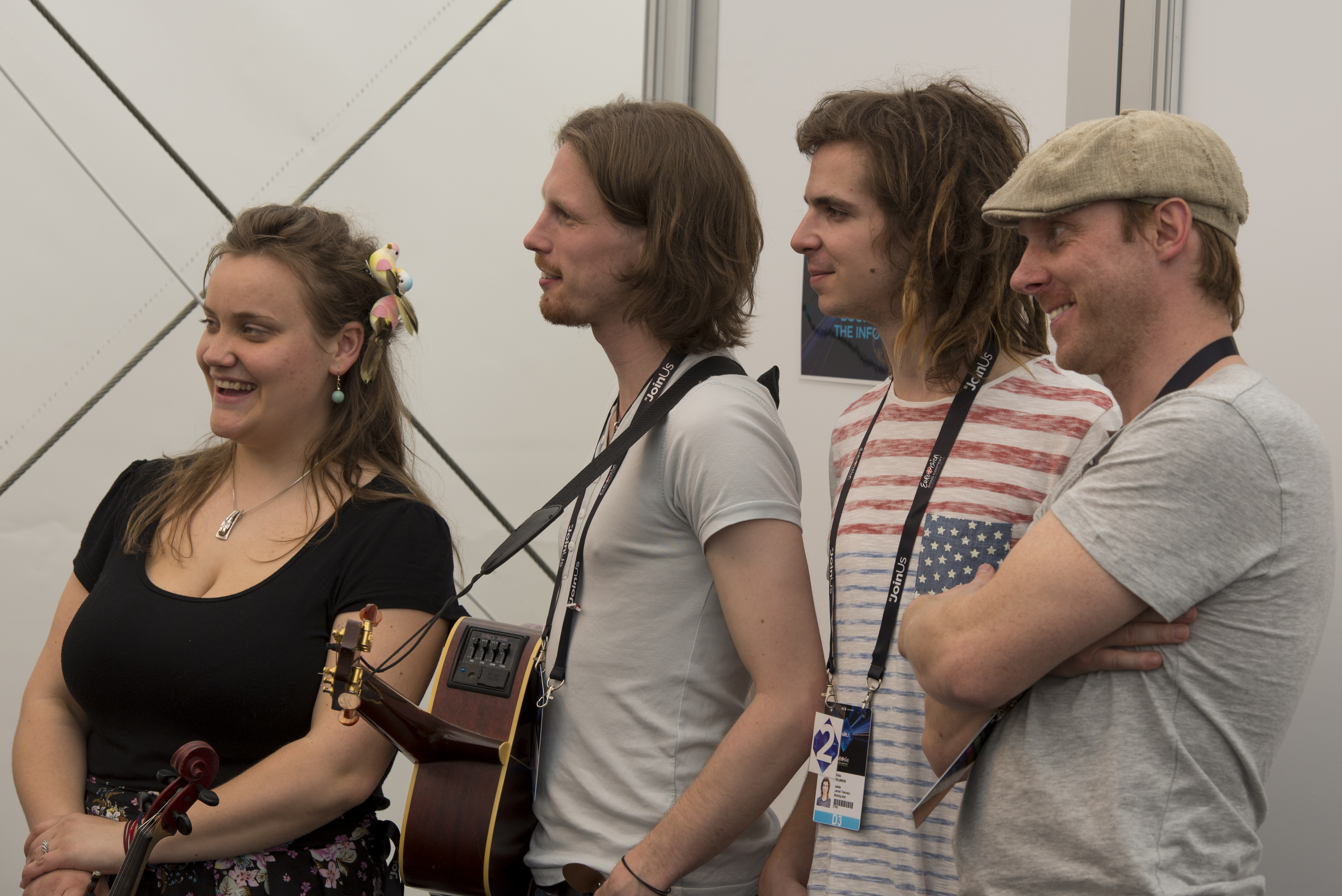
Aarzemnieki

Aarzemnieki (Latvian: [ˈaːrzæmniɛki]; an internet style writing of the Latvian word "ārzemnieki", meaning "foreigners") are a Latvian band that represented Latvia in the Eurovision Song Contest 2014 in Copenhagen, Denmark, with their song "Cake to Bake". The lead singer of the band, Jöran Steinhauer, is German.

Awards and achievements
Preceded by PeR with "Here We Go"	Latvia in the Eurovision Song Contest; 2014	Succeeded by Aminata with "Love Injected"
