= Draugiem.lv =

Latvian social networking website

Draugiem, Ltd.
- Company type: Private company
- Website type: Social network service
- Available in: Latvian, Russian, English
- Headquarters: Latvia
- Key people: Lauris Liberts, Founder
- Website: www.draugiem.lv
- Advertising: Banner ads
- Registration: Required
- Launched: April 24, 2004
- Current status: Active

Draugiem (For Friends) is a social networking website launched in 2004. It is one of the largest social networking website in Latvia with approximately 2.6 million registered users.

The Draugiem social network operates under the Draugiem Group, an umbrella organisation that owns other IT-related companies which have developed as suppliers of technology to the social network.

The English-language version of Draugiem is known as Frype.com.

== History ==
The Draugiem.lv social network was founded in 2004 by Lauris Liberts and Agris Tamanis. In 2007, the company reported that it had reached 1,000,000 users. By 2017, the company had opened offices and facilities in Cēsis, Barcelona, Los Angeles, Charlotte and Tijuana, as well as relocating their Rīga headquarters to a bigger building in the neighborhood of Torņakalns. In 2019, Mapon (part of Draugiem Group) opened offices in Estonia and Finland.

In the 2018 Latvian parliamentary election, on October 6 the main page of Draugiem.lv was hacked and replaced with an image of a Russian flag, Russian president Vladimir Putin and Russian army, as well as text in Russian saying "Latvian comrades, this is for you. Russia's borders are boundless. Russian world can and needs to unite everyone who values Russian culture no matter where they live – in Russia or outside its borders. We recommend using the phrase 'Russian world' more often", while the Russian national anthem played in the background. The website was taken offline and re-opened a few hours later.

== Brands ==
=== Printful ===
Printful was launched in 2013 to provide print-on-demand services. Initially, the company offered 3 products – posters, canvases and t-shirts.

=== Road Games ===
In 2019, the company created Roadgames, an adventure travel game, with an investment of EUR 100,000. The game requires participants to take part in tasks outside, and is intended as a team building activity for organizations.

=== Mapon ===
The Mapon brand was launched in 2006 to provide GPS tracking services for businesses, and is the second largest brand in the Draugiem company with 54 employees and offices in Finland.

=== Fast Brands ===
Fast Brands was launched in 2018 and provides companies with the opportunity to sell products online.
