= Latvia in the Eurovision Song Contest 2015 =

- Eurovision Song Contest 2015
- Participating broadcaster: Latvijas Televīzija (LTV)
- Country: Latvia
- Selection process: Supernova 2015
- Selection date: 22 February 2015

Competing entry
- Song: "Love Injected"
- Artist: Aminata
- Songwriters: Aminata Savadogo

Placement
- Semi-final result: Qualified (2nd, 155 points)
- Final result: 6th, 186 points

Participation chronology

Latvia was represented at the Eurovision Song Contest 2015 with the song "Love Injected" written and performed by Aminata. The Latvian participating broadcaster, Latvijas Televīzija (LTV), organised the national final Supernova 2015 in order to select the entry for the contest. Twenty songs were selected to compete in the national final, which consisted of four shows: two heats, one semi-final and a final. In the heats and the semi-final, four entries were selected to advance from each show: two entries selected based on a public televote and two entries selected by a four-member jury panel. Four songs ultimately qualified to compete in the final on 22 February 2015 where a public vote exclusively selected "Love Injected" performed by Aminata as the winner.

Latvia was drawn to compete in the second semi-final of the Eurovision Song Contest which took place on 21 May 2015. Performing during the show in position 10, "Love Injected" was announced among the top 10 entries of the second semi-final and therefore qualified to compete in the final on 23 May. It was later revealed that Latvia placed second out of the 17 participating countries in the semi-final with 155 points. In the final, Latvia performed in position 19 and placed sixth out of the 27 participating countries, scoring 186 points. This was Latvia's best placing in the contest since 2005.

== Background ==
Prior to the 2015 contest, Latvijas Televīzija (LTV) had participated in the Eurovision Song Contest representing Latvia fifteen times since its first entry in 2000. Latvia won the contest once in 2002 with the song "I Wanna" performed by Marie N. Following the introduction of semi-finals for the 2004, Latvia was able to qualify to compete in the final between 2005 and 2008. Between 2009 and 2014, it had failed to qualify to the final for six consecutive years including with its 2014 entry "Cake to Bake" performed by Aarzemnieki.

As part of its duties as participating broadcaster, LTV organises the selection of its entry in the Eurovision Song Contest and broadcasts the event in the country. The broadcaster confirmed its intentions to participate at the 2015 contest on 8 September 2014. LTV has selected their entries for the contest through a national final. Since its debut in 2000 until 2012, LTV had organised the selection show Eirodziesma. In a response to the failure to qualify to the final at Eurovision since 2008, between 2013 and 2014, the competition was rebranded and retooled as Dziesma. After failing to produce successful entries those two years, LTV announced that it would be organising a new national final titled Supernova in order to select the entry for the 2015 contest. LTV outlined that the goal of the competition is to find a song that has international hit potential and an artist that is charismatic, talented and capable of performing the selected song.

== Before Eurovision ==
=== Supernova 2015 ===
Supernova 2015 was the first edition of Supernova, the music competition that selects Latvia's entries for the Eurovision Song Contest. The competition commenced on 1 February 2015 and concluded with a final on 22 February 2015. All shows in the competition took place at the LTV Studio 6 in Riga, hosted by Ketija Šēnberga and Toms Grēviņš and broadcast on LTV1 as well as online via the official Supernova website supernova.lsm.lv. An alternative broadcast of the final also occurred online at lsm.lv with commentary by the duo Transleiteris consisting of Edžus Ķaukulis and Lauris Mihailovs.

==== Format ====
The format of the competition consisted of four shows: two heats, one semi-final and a final. LTV broadcast two introductory shows on 18 and 25 January 2015 that covered the background preparation processes and performer auditions that occurred prior to the competition. The two heats, held on 1 and 8 February 2015, each featured ten competing entries from which four advanced to the semi-final from each show. The semi-final, held on 15 February 2015, featured the eight qualifiers from the heats from which four proceeded to the final. The final, held on 22 February 2015, selected the Latvian entry for Vienna from the remaining four entries.

Results during the heats and the semi-final shows were determined by a jury panel and votes from the public. In the heats and the semi-final, the songs first faced a public vote where the top two entries qualified. The jury then selected an additional two qualifiers from the remaining entries to proceed in the competition. In the final, a public vote exclusively determined which entry would be the winner. Viewers were able to vote via telephone up to five times or via SMS with a single SMS counting as five votes. The online vote conducted through the official Supernova website allowed users to vote once per each accepted social network account: Draugiem.lv, Facebook and Twitter. During the competition, the jury panel also had the right to reinstate an eliminated song if they believed the song had potential with an artist that was still active in the competition. Should this have occurred, the jury would replace a competing artist's song with the eliminated song.

The jury participated in each show by providing feedback to the competing artists and selecting entries to advance in the competition. The panel consists of:

- Kaspars Roga – drummer for Brainstorm and director of music videos
- Guntars Račs – musician, songwriter, producer and music publisher
- Dons – singer-songwriter
- Ieva Kerēvica – singer and vocal teacher

==== Competing entries ====
Artists and songwriters were able to submit their applications and entries separately to the broadcaster between 3 November 2014 and 10 December 2014. 98 songs were submitted and 123 performers applied for the competition at the conclusion of the submission period. Local and international jury panels were appointed by LTV for the selection process; the international jury panel conducted the song selection from the submitted songs while the local jury panel screened and selected the performers. The international jury panel consisted of Peo Nylén (producer and representative of Scandinavian Songs AB record company), Michael Jay (producer and songwriter) and Jarkko Nordlund (Universal Music Group Finland and the Baltic region manager). The local jury panel consisted of the four-member jury panel during the live shows: Kaspars Roga, Guntars Račs, Dons and Ieva Kerēvica. The performer auditions took place on 5 January 2015 and featured 56 shortlisted performers from the initial 123 that had applied. The twenty competing artists and songs were announced during a press conference on 13 January 2015.

Artist	Song	Songwriter(s)
Aminata	"Love Injected"	Aminata Savadogo
Antra Stafecka	"It's the Night"	Antra Stafecka, Kerija Kalēja
Atis Ieviņš	"Catfish"	Ralfs Eilands, Reinis Briģis
ElektroFolk	"Sundance"	Ainārs Majors, Arnolds Kārklis
Euphony	"Home"	Andris Kivičs
Framest	"Ziemā"	Jānis Ķirsis, Inga Pizāne – Dilba
Katrīna Bindere	"Run to You"	Diāna Černe
Katrīna Cīrule	"Bass"	Katrīna Cīrule, Jānis Ķirsis
Lana Frančeska	"Lions"	Ingars Viļums, Lana Frančeska Švilpe
Linda Ķaukule	"Save Our Love"	Ruslans Kuksinovičs
Markus Riva	"Take Me Down"	Miķelis Ļaksa
Milenin and Kamilla	"Colours of Love"	Gaitis Lazdāns, Mārtiņš Taranda
Mntha	"Nefelibata"	Marija Mickeviča
Mārtiņš Ruskis and Ginta Krievkalna	"Debesis"	Jānis Ķirsis, Pēteris Draguns
Ornella	"Angel"	Rino Rudevičs
Riga Metro	"High Heels"	Elīna Dumpe, Antons Kekļa, Valters Suķis, Gusts Kaksis
Rihards Bērziņš	"Your Eyes"	Ingars Viļums
Rihards Saule	"Life Lines"	Lauris Valters
Signe	"Sweet Girl"	Reinis Briģis, Alise Kante
The Stones	"Free Your Mind"	Igors Voļhins

==== Shows ====
===== Heats =====
The two heats took place on 1 and 8 February 2015. In each heat ten acts competed and four entries qualified to the semi-final. The competing entries first faced a public vote where the top two songs advanced; an additional two qualifiers were then selected from the remaining eight entries by the jury.

Public vote qualifier Jury qualifier

Heat 1 – 1 February 2015
R/O	Artist	Song	Result
1	Katrīna Cīrule	"Bass"	—N/a
2	Lana Frančeska	"Lions"	—N/a
3	Atis Ieviņš	"Catfish"	—N/a
4	Milenin and Kamilla	"Colours of Love"	—N/a
5	Antra Stafecka	"It's the Night"	Advanced
6	Framest	"Ziemā"	Advanced
7	Linda Ķaukule	"Save Our Love"	—N/a
8	Mntha	"Nefelibata"	Advanced
9	Rihards Saule	"Life Lines"	—N/a
10	ElektroFolk	"Sundance"	Advanced

Heat 2 – 8 February 2015
R/O	Artist	Song	Result
1	The Stones	"Free Your Mind"	—N/a
2	Signe	"Sweet Girl"	—N/a
3	Mārtiņš Ruskis and Ginta Krievkalna	"Debesis"	—N/a
4	Ornella	"Angel"	—N/a
5	Rihards Bērziņš	"Your Eyes"	Advanced
6	Euphony	"Home"	Advanced
7	Riga Metro	"High Heels"	—N/a
8	Katrīna Bindere	"Run to You"	—N/a
9	Markus Riva	"Take Me Down"	Advanced
10	Aminata	"Love Injected"	Advanced

===== Semi-final =====
The semi-final took place on 15 February 2015. 2009 Latvian Eurovision entrant Intars Busulis was a guest juror for the semi-final, filling in for Dons. Four entries qualified to the final. The eight competing entries first faced a public vote where the top two songs advanced. An additional two qualifiers were selected from the remaining six entries by the jury.

Public vote qualifier Jury qualifier

Semi-final – 15 February 2015
R/O	Artist	Song	Result
1	ElektroFolk	"Sundance"	Advanced
2	Aminata	"Love Injected"	Advanced
3	Mntha	"Nefelibata"	Advanced
4	Markus Riva	"Take Me Down"	Advanced
5	Antra Stafecka	"It's the Night"	—N/a
6	Euphony	"Home"	—N/a
7	Framest	"Ziemā"	—N/a
8	Rihards Bērziņš	"Your Eyes"	—N/a

===== Final =====
The final took place on 22 February 2015. The four entries that qualified from the semi-final competed. The song with the highest number of votes from the public, "Love Injected" performed by Aminata, was declared the winner. In addition to the performances of the competing entries, guest performers included the band bet bet, singer Dons and 2000 Latvian Eurovision entrant Brainstorm.

Final – 22 February 2015
R/O	Artist	Song	Public Vote			
R/O	Artist	Song	Internet	Televote	Total	Place
1	Aminata	"Love Injected"	8,319	14,017	22,336	1
2	Mntha	"Nefelibata"	3,010	7,352	10,362	4
3	ElektroFolk	"Sundance"	2,803	7,971	10,774	3
4	Markus Riva	"Take Me Down"	5,818	9,932	15,750	2

=== Promotion ===
Aminata made several appearances across Europe to specifically promote "Love Injected" as the Latvian Eurovision entry. On 18 April, Aminata performed during the Eurovision in Concert event which was held at the Melkweg venue in Amsterdam, Netherlands and hosted by Cornald Maas and Edsilia Rombley. On 26 April, Aminata performed during the London Eurovision Party, which was held at the Café de Paris venue in London, United Kingdom and hosted by Nicki French and Paddy O'Connell. In addition to her international appearances, Aminata performed during the Eurovision PreParty Riga, which was organised by OGAE Latvia and held at the Palladium Concert Hall in Riga on 17 April.

== At Eurovision ==
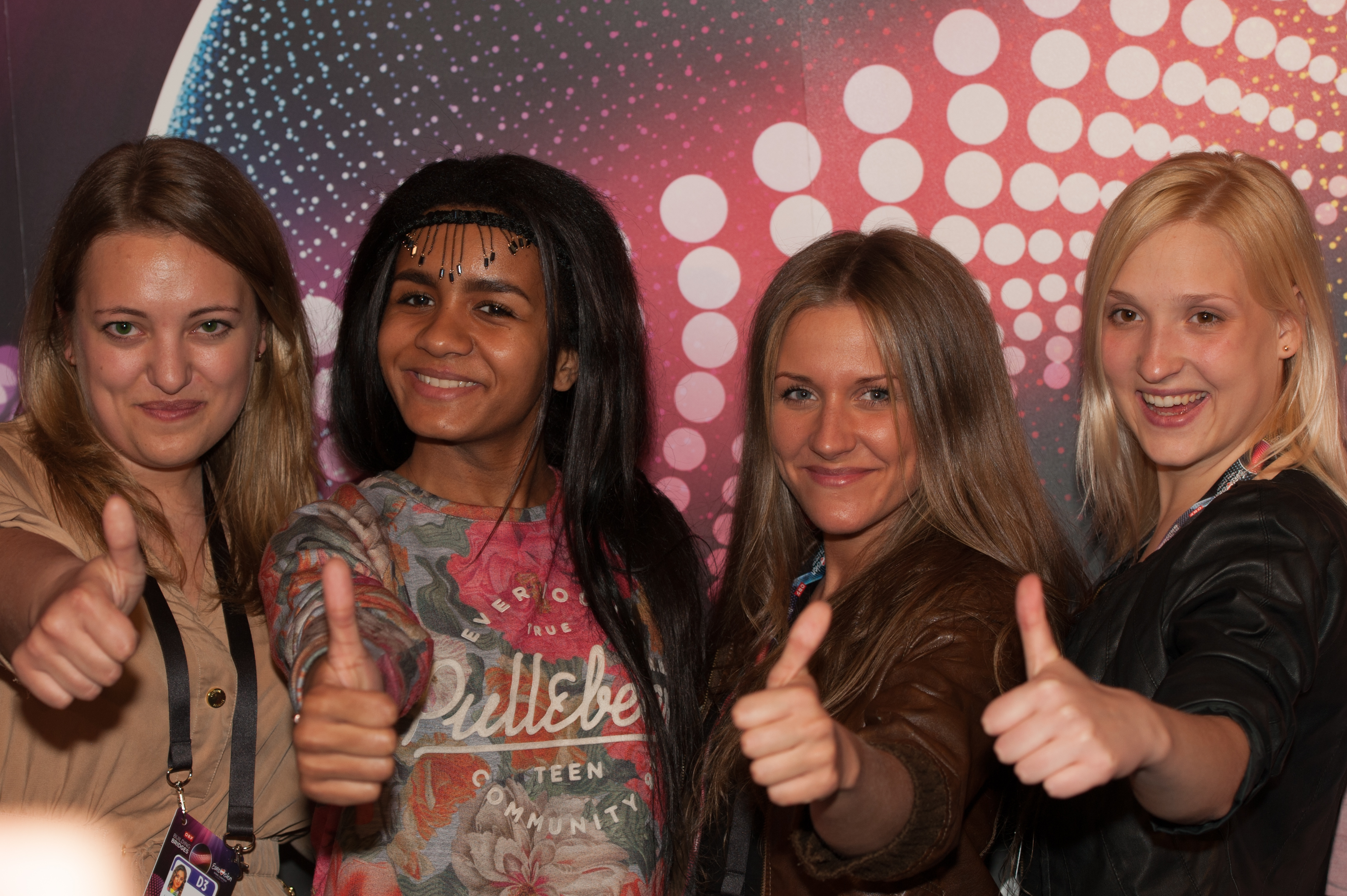
Aminata during a press meet and greet

According to Eurovision rules, all nations with the exceptions of the host country and the "Big Five" (France, Germany, Italy, Spain and the United Kingdom) are required to qualify from one of two semi-finals in order to compete for the final; the top ten countries from each semi-final progress to the final. In the 2015 contest, Australia also competed directly in the final as an invited guest nation. The European Broadcasting Union (EBU) split up the competing countries into five different pots based on voting patterns from previous contests, with countries with favourable voting histories put into the same pot. On 26 January 2015, a special allocation draw was held which placed each country into one of the two semi-finals, as well as which half of the show they would perform in. Latvia was placed into the second semi-final, to be held on 21 May 2015, and was scheduled to perform in the second half of the show.

Once all the competing songs for the 2015 contest had been released, the running order for the semi-finals was decided by the shows' producers rather than through another draw, so that similar songs were not placed next to each other. Latvia was set to perform in position 10, following the entry from Israel and before the entry from Azerbaijan.

The two semi-finals and the final were broadcast in Latvia on LTV1 with all shows featuring commentary by Valters Frīdenbergs who was joined by Toms Grēviņš for the final. The Latvian spokesperson, who announced the Latvian votes during the final, was Markus Riva.

=== Semi-final ===
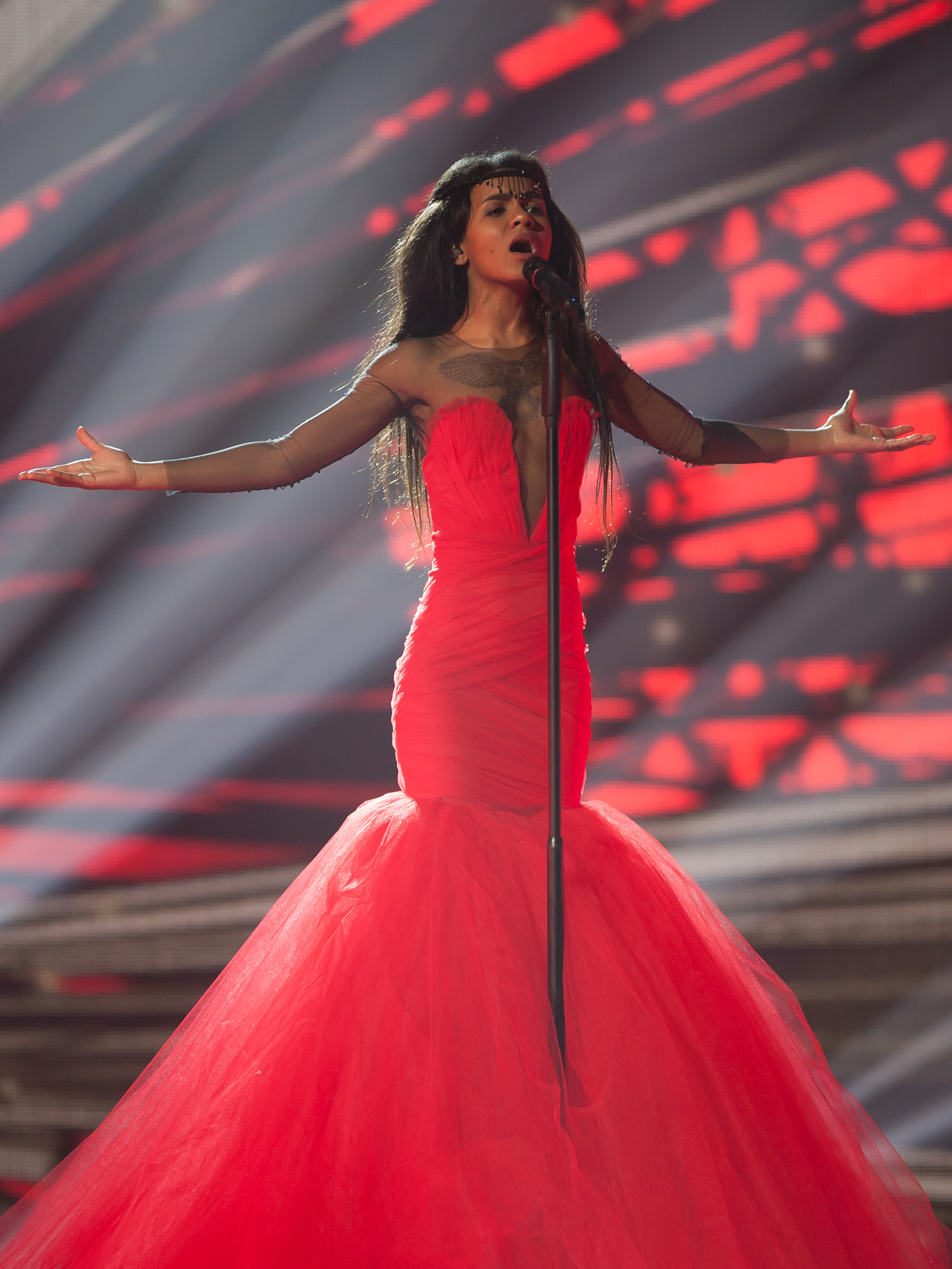
Aminata during a rehearsal before the second semi-final

Aminata took part in technical rehearsals on 14 and 16 May, followed by dress rehearsals on 20 and 21 May. This included the jury show on 20 May where the professional juries of each country watched and voted on the competing entries.

The Latvian performance featured Aminata in a long red dress and black jewellery standing on a pedestal at the centre of the stage. Special tattoos were applied to Aminata's body for effect. Red and white lighting was used in addition to fast camera shot cuts that showed wide angles, top shots and close shots. The LED screens displayed cathedral-like windows along with moving rays and white strobe lights. Aminata was joined by three backing vocalists: Līva Zariņa, Katrīna Anna Vīgante and Anna Zankovska.

At the end of the show, Latvia was announced as having finished in the top ten and subsequently qualifying for the grand final. It was later revealed that the Latvia placed second in the semi-final, receiving a total of 155 points. This was the first time in six years that Latvia had managed to qualify to the Eurovision final; their last appearance in a final was in 2008.

=== Final ===
Shortly after the second semi-final, a winner's press conference was held for the ten qualifying countries. As part of this press conference, the qualifying artists took part in a draw to determine which half of the grand final they would subsequently participate in. This draw was done in the order the countries were announced during the semi-final. Latvia was drawn to compete in the second half. Following this draw, the shows' producers decided upon the running order of the final, as they had done for the semi-finals. Latvia was subsequently placed to perform in position 19, following the entry from Poland and before the entry from Romania.

Aminata once again took part in dress rehearsals on 22 and 23 May before the final, including the jury final where the professional juries cast their final votes before the live show. Aminata performed a repeat of her semi-final performance during the final on 23 May. At the conclusion of the voting, Latvia placed sixth with 186 points. Latvia received 12 points, the maximum number of points a country can give to another country, from three countries. This result was Latvia's best since they placed fifth in 2005 with the song "The War Is Not Over" performed by Walters and Kazha.

=== Voting ===
Voting during the three shows consisted of 50 percent public televoting and 50 percent from a jury deliberation. The jury consisted of five music industry professionals who were citizens of the country they represent, with their names published before the contest to ensure transparency. This jury was asked to judge each contestant based on: vocal capacity; the stage performance; the song's composition and originality; and the overall impression by the act. In addition, no member of a national jury could be related in any way to any of the competing acts in such a way that they cannot vote impartially and independently. The individual rankings of each jury member were released shortly after the grand final.

Following the release of the full split voting by the EBU after the conclusion of the competition, it was revealed that Latvia had placed eighth with the public televote and second with the jury vote in the final. In the public vote, Latvia scored 100 points finishing in tenth place, while in the jury vote, Latvia placed second with 249 points. In the second semi-final, Latvia placed third with the public televote receiving 116 points and second with the jury vote with 155 points.

Below is a breakdown of points awarded to Latvia and awarded by Latvia in the second semi-final and grand final of the contest, and the breakdown of the jury voting and televoting conducted during the two shows:

==== Points awarded to Latvia ====
Points awarded to Latvia (Semi-final 2)
Score	Country
12 points	Ireland; Lithuania
10 points	Australia; Germany; San Marino; United Kingdom
8 points	Cyprus; Czech Republic; Italy; Slovenia; Sweden; Switzerland
7 points	Iceland; Malta; Norway; Poland; Portugal
6 points	Azerbaijan
5 points	
4 points	
3 points	
2 points	Israel
1 point	

Points awarded to Latvia (Final)
Score	Country
12 points	Ireland; Lithuania; San Marino
10 points	Poland
8 points	Norway
7 points	Australia; Belgium; France; Iceland; Slovenia; United Kingdom
6 points	Estonia; Finland; Germany
5 points	Azerbaijan; Belarus; Czech Republic; Hungary; Romania; Sweden
4 points	Denmark; Georgia; Italy; Malta; Spain; Switzerland
3 points	Cyprus; Greece
2 points	Armenia; Moldova; Netherlands; Portugal; Russia
1 point	Austria; Serbia

==== Points awarded by Latvia ====
Points awarded by Latvia (Semi-final 2)
Score	Country
12 points	Sweden
10 points	Lithuania
8 points	Slovenia
7 points	Norway
6 points	Cyprus
5 points	Poland
4 points	Ireland
3 points	Israel
2 points	Montenegro
1 point	Czech Republic

Points awarded by Latvia (Final)
Score	Country
12 points	Sweden
10 points	Russia
8 points	Italy
7 points	Lithuania
6 points	Estonia
5 points	Australia
4 points	Belgium
3 points	Slovenia
2 points	Norway
1 point	Israel

==== Detailed voting results ====
The following members comprised the Latvian jury:

- Kristaps Krievkalns (jury chairperson) – composer, producer
- Beāte Zviedre – singer
- Ralfs Eilands – singer, composer, represented Latvia in the 2013 contest as part of PeR
- Toms Grēviņš – DJ, presenter
- Ilona Jahimoviča – journalist, producer

Detailed voting results from Latvia (Semi-final 2)
R/O	Country	K. Krievkalns	B. Zviedre	R. Eilands	T. Grēviņš	I. Jahimoviča	Jury Rank	Televote Rank	Combined Rank	Points
01	Lithuania	7	13	1	5	5	5	1	2	10
02	Ireland	4	7	3	2	6	2	14	7	4
03	San Marino	16	16	16	9	16	16	13	15	
04	Montenegro	5	2	7	4	14	6	12	9	2
05	Malta	6	9	8	12	9	11	16	14	
06	Norway	8	1	4	10	2	3	5	4	7
07	Portugal	14	15	14	16	11	15	15	16	
08	Czech Republic	13	12	15	15	10	13	6	10	1
09	Israel	3	3	12	11	15	10	7	8	3
10	Latvia									
11	Azerbaijan	12	10	9	8	7	12	10	12	
12	Iceland	15	14	11	13	12	14	9	13	
13	Sweden	1	4	2	1	1	1	2	1	12
14	Switzerland	11	8	10	7	8	9	11	11	
15	Cyprus	10	6	6	3	13	7	3	5	6
16	Slovenia	2	5	5	14	3	4	4	3	8
17	Poland	9	11	13	6	4	8	8	6	5

Detailed voting results from Latvia (Final)
R/O	Country	K. Krievkalns	B. Zviedre	R. Eilands	T. Grēviņš	I. Jahimoviča	Jury Rank	Televote Rank	Combined Rank	Points
01	Slovenia	4	11	12	22	7	10	7	8	3
02	France	5	5	8	6	22	6	24	13	
03	Israel	11	12	18	16	24	15	9	10	1
04	Estonia	15	23	2	10	5	9	2	5	6
05	United Kingdom	23	19	15	21	6	18	16	19	
06	Armenia	25	25	23	26	17	26	23	25	
07	Lithuania	10	14	6	9	8	7	3	4	7
08	Serbia	22	16	11	19	25	24	22	24	
09	Norway	24	4	9	15	9	11	8	9	2
10	Sweden	2	3	1	3	2	1	4	1	12
11	Cyprus	8	22	25	7	23	20	12	17	
12	Australia	1	1	3	1	10	2	10	6	5
13	Belgium	16	7	4	18	3	8	6	7	4
14	Austria	3	9	7	4	4	3	21	11	
15	Greece	7	15	24	20	16	16	25	23	
16	Montenegro	17	8	13	8	26	12	19	16	
17	Germany	9	10	14	25	15	14	17	14	
18	Poland	21	24	19	11	14	21	20	22	
19	Latvia									
20	Romania	20	21	17	12	21	23	14	20	
21	Spain	12	13	20	14	13	13	18	15	
22	Hungary	19	20	10	23	12	19	13	18	
23	Georgia	13	17	16	17	19	17	11	12	
24	Azerbaijan	18	18	21	13	20	22	15	21	
25	Russia	6	6	26	5	1	5	1	2	10
26	Albania	26	26	22	24	18	25	26	26	
27	Italy	14	2	5	2	11	4	5	3	8
