= Latvia in the Eurovision Song Contest 2023 =

- Eurovision Song Contest 2023
- Country: Latvia
- Selection process: Supernova 2023
- Selection date: 11 February 2023

Competing entry
- Song: "Aijā"
- Artist: Sudden Lights
- Songwriters: Andrejs Reinis Zitmanis; Kārlis Matīss Zitmanis; Kārlis Vārtiņš; Mārtiņš Matīss Zemītis

Placement
- Semi-final result: Failed to qualify (11th)

Participation chronology

Latvia was represented at the Eurovision Song Contest 2023 with the song "Aijā" performed by Sudden Lights. The Latvian broadcaster Latvijas Televīzija (LTV) organised the national final Supernova 2023 in order to select the Latvian entry for the contest. 14 songs were selected to compete in the national final, which consisted of two shows: a semi-final and a final. In the semi-final on 4 February 2023, ten entries were selected to advance to compete in the final on 11 February 2023 where a public televote and an eight-member jury panel selected "Aijā" performed by Sudden Lights as the winner.

Latvia was drawn to compete in the first semi-final of the Eurovision Song Contest which took place on 9 May 2023. Performing during the show in position 4, "Aijā" was not announced among the top 10 entries of the first semi-final and therefore did not qualify to compete in the final. It was later revealed that Latvia placed 11th out of the 15 participating countries in the semi-final with 34 points.

== Background ==
Prior to 2023, Latvia has participated in the Eurovision Song Contest 22 times since its first entry in 2000. Latvia won the contest once in 2002 with the song "I Wanna" performed by Marie N. Following the introduction of semi-finals in 2004, Latvia was able to qualify for the final between 2005 and 2008. Between 2009 and 2014, the nation had failed to qualify to the final for six consecutive years before managing to qualify to the final in 2015 and 2016. Latvia had failed to qualify to the final for five consecutive contests since 2017, including with their 2022 entry "Eat Your Salad" performed by Citi Zēni.

The Latvian broadcaster, Latvijas Televīzija (LTV), broadcasts the event within the country and organises the national selection. Since 2015, Latvia had selected its entries using the national final format Supernova. On 3 August 2022, LTV confirmed its intention to participate in the 2023 contest and to select its entry through Supernova. On 21 September 2022, it was confirmed by LTV that Supernova would be organised for eighth time to select the Latvian entry for 2023.

== Before Eurovision ==
=== Supernova 2023 ===
Supernova 2023 was the eighth edition of the national final format used to select Latvia's entry for the Eurovision Song Contest. The competition commenced on 4 February 2023 with a semi-final and concluded with a final on 11 February 2023. The two shows in the competition took place at the LTV Studio 6 in Riga, hosted by Ketija Šēnberga and Lauris Reiniks and broadcast on LTV1 as well as online via the streaming platform Replay.lv and the official Supernova website supernova.lsm.lv. The national final was also broadcast on LTV7 with sign language translation as well as online at lsm.lv.

==== Format ====
The format of the competition consisted of two shows: a semi-final and a final. The semi-final, which was held on 4 February 2023, featured 15 competing entries from which the top ten entries advanced to the final. The final, held on 12 February 2023, selected the Latvian entry for Liverpool from the remaining entries. Results during the semi-final and final shows were determined by the 50/50 combination of votes from a jury panel and a public vote, with both the jury and public vote assigning points from 1–8, 10, and 12 based on the number of competing songs in the respective show. Viewers were able to vote via telephone or via SMS.

The jury voted in each show and selected entries to advance in the competition. The panel consisted of:

- Anna Platpīre – LTV Content Editor
- Arvīds Babris – Director of LTV
- Aija Auškāpa – Founder of Prāta vētra Recording Company
- Karīna Tropa – Singer and Vocal Coach
- Maija Sējāne – Singer and Music Producer
- Magnuss Eriņš – Radio personality and DJ
- Gediminas Jaunius – Lithuanian TV Director and Producer
- Edward van de Vendel – Dutch Journalist

==== Competing entries ====
On 21 September 2022, the broadcaster opened the song submission for artists to apply, with the deadline set for 1 December 2022. It was later announced that 121 songs were submitted at the conclusion of the submission period. The submitted songs were evaluated by a jury panel appointed by LTV and selected 15 performers and songs, which were announced on 5 January 2023. Among the competing artists was Justs, who represented Latvia in the Eurovision Song Contest 2016. On 6 January 2023, Saule was disqualified from the competition due to the song being previously performed in 2021.

Artist	Song	Composer(s)
24. Avēnija	"You Said"	Ernests Vīgners, Kārlis Grīnbergs
Adriana Miglāne	"Like I Wanna"	Adriana Miglāne, Charlie Mason, Darren Michaels, Martin Älenmark
Alise Haijima	"Tricky"	Alise Haijima
Artūrs Hatti	"Love Vibes"	Agnese Rozniece, Baiba Ozoliņa, Karlīne Anna Ērgle, Matīss Repsis, Toms Kalderauskis
Avéi	"Let Me Go"	Daniela Brilovska, Ieva Kudlāne, Raitis Aukšmuksts
Inspo	"Sway"	Aivars Lietaunieks, Nadīna Stirniniece
Justs	"Strangers"	Justs Sirmais, Uku Moldau, Weronika Maria Gabryelczyk
Katrine Miller	"Beaten Down"	Andris Lūkins, Katrīne Millere
Luīze	"You to Hold Me"	Luīze Vītola
Markus Riva	"Forever"	Markus Riva
Patrisha	"Hush"	Jūlijs Melngailis, Krists Indrišonoks, Nanna Prip Pedersen, Patrīcija Ksenija Cuprijanoviča, Rūdolfs Budze
Raum	"Fake Love"	Daniel Levi Viinalass, Jānis Jačmenkins, Reinis Straume
~~Saule~~	~~"Finally Happy"~~	~~Krišjānis Suntažs, Rolands Priverts~~
Sudden Lights	"Aijā"	Andrejs Reinis Zitmanis, Kārlis Matīss Zitmanis, Kārlis Vārtiņš, Mārtiņš Matīss Zemītis
Toms Kalderauskis	"When It All Falls"	Julianna Tīruma, Toms Kalderauskis

==== Semi-final ====
The semi-final took place on 4 February 2023. In the semi-final, 14 acts competed and the top ten entries qualified to the final based on the combination of votes from a jury panel and the Latvian public.

Semi-final – 4 February 2023
R/O	Artist	Song	Result
1	Artūrs Hatti	"Love Vibes"	Advanced
2	Alise Haijima	"Tricky"	Advanced
3	Inspo	"Sway"	Eliminated
4	Toms Kalderauskis	"When It All Falls"	Advanced
5	Katrine Miller	"Beaten Down"	Eliminated
6	Justs	"Strangers"	Eliminated
7	Adriana Miglāne	"Like I Wanna"	Eliminated
8	24. Avēnija	"You Said"	Advanced
9	Markus Riva	"Forever"	Advanced
10	Avéi	"Let Me Go"	Advanced
11	Patrisha	"Hush"	Advanced
12	Raum	"Fake Love"	Advanced
13	Luīze	"You to Hold Me"	Advanced
14	Sudden Lights	"Aijā"	Advanced

==== Final ====
The final took place on 11 February 2023. The ten entries that advanced from the semi-final competed. The song with the highest number of votes based on the combination of votes from a jury panel and the Latvian public, "Aijā" by Sudden Lights, was declared the winner. In addition to the competing entries, the show featured guest performances from Eurovision Song Contest 2019 winner Duncan Laurence, and Elīza Legzdiņa and Beanie from Rudimental.

Final – 11 February 2023
R/O	Artist	Song	Jury rank	Televote		Place
R/O	Artist	Song	Jury rank	Votes	Rank	Place
1	Alise Haijima	"Tricky"	8	5,607	8	8
2	Luīze	"You to Hold Me"	9	2,384	10	10
3	Raum	"Fake Love"	7	6,986	6	6
4	Toms Kalderauskis	"When It All Falls"	4	2,608	9	7
5	Artūrs Hatti	"Love Vibes"	10	6,251	7	9
6	Patrisha	"Hush"	2	50,958	2	2
7	Sudden Lights	"Aijā"	1	66,307	1	1
8	24. Avēnija	"You Said"	3	8,735	4	3
9	Avéi	"Let Me Go"	6	8,294	5	5
10	Markus Riva	"Forever"	5	27,302	3	4

==== Ratings ====
Viewing figures by show
Show	Air date	Viewing figures		Ref.
Show	Air date	Nominal	Share	Ref.
Semi-final	4 February 2023	97,700	5.5%	
Final	12 February 2023	84,800	4.8%	

== At Eurovision ==
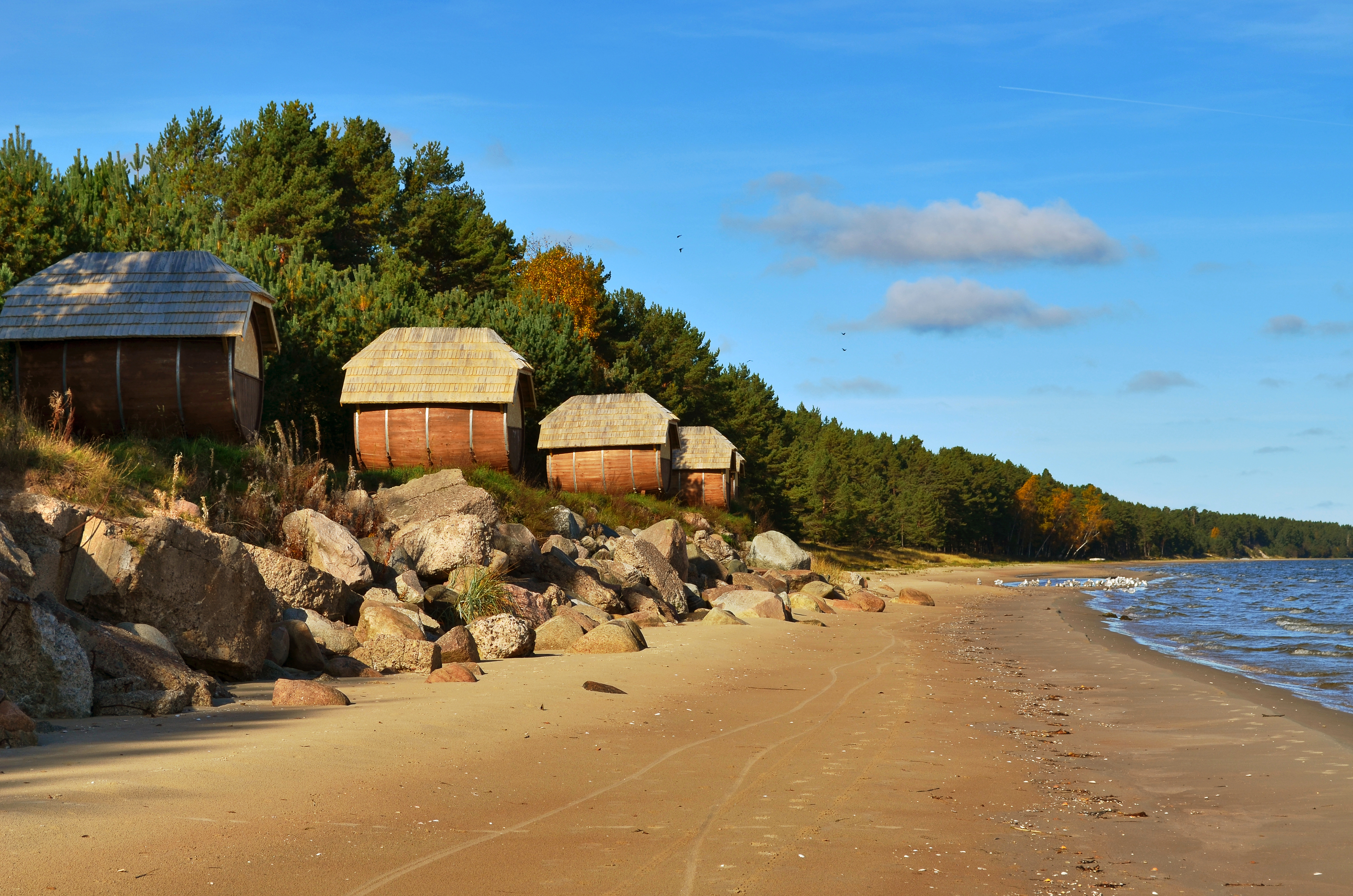
A video postcard introduced Sudden Lights' performance in the first semi-final of the Eurovision Song Contest 2023. The postcard was filmed in Melnsils in the Talsi Municipality in March 2023 in collaboration with the host broadcaster BBC. The Beach huts at Boscombe beach in Bournemouth and Ecospace pods in the Kyiv Sea also featured in the Latvian postcard.

According to Eurovision rules, all nations with the exceptions of the host country and the "Big Five" (France, Germany, Italy, Spain and the United Kingdom) are required to qualify from one of two semi-finals in order to compete for the final; the top ten countries from each semi-final progress to the final. The European Broadcasting Union (EBU) split up the competing countries into six different pots based on voting patterns from previous contests, with countries with favourable voting histories put into the same pot. On 31 January 2023, an allocation draw was held, which placed each country into one of the two semi-finals, and determined which half of the show they would perform in. Latvia has been placed into the first semi-final, to be held on 9 May 2023, and has been scheduled to perform in the first half of the show.

Once all the competing songs for the 2023 contest had been released, the running order for the semi-finals was decided by the shows' producers rather than through another draw, so that similar songs were not placed next to each other. Latvia was set to perform in position 4, following the entry from Serbia and before the entry from Portugal.

The two semi-finals and the final were broadcast in Latvia on LTV1 with all shows featuring commentary by Toms Grēviņš and Lauris Reiniks. The Latvian spokesperson, who announced the top 12-point score awarded by the Latvian jury during the final, was Jānis Pētersons, who represented Latvia in the Eurovision Song Contest 2022 as a member of Citi Zēni.

=== Semi-final ===
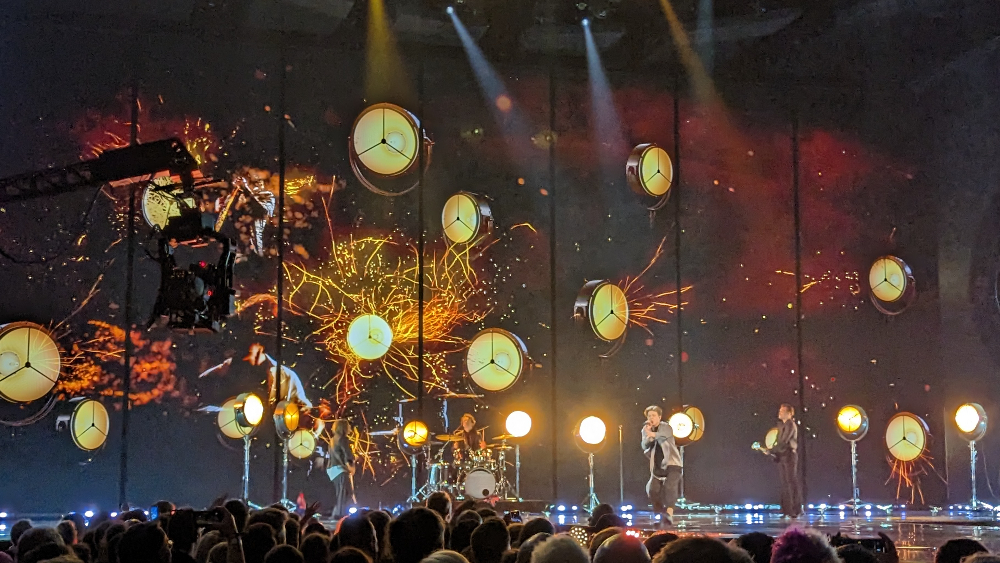
Sudden Lights during a rehearsal before the first semi-final.

Sudden Lights took part in technical rehearsals on 30 April and 2 May, followed by dress rehearsals on 8 and 9 May. This included the jury show on 8 May where the professional back-up juries of each country watched and voted in a result used if any issues with public televoting occurred. Lead singer of Sudden Lights, Andrejs Reinis Zitmanis, stated "the stage is grand, the sound is fantastic, this is exactly what we hoped to see at the big competition. Our performance was polished at the emotional level, and we are confident that the performance will be impressive".

At the end of the show, Latvia was not announced among the top 10 entries in the first semi-final and therefore failed to qualify to compete in the final. This was Latvia's sixth consecutive non-qualification to the grand final having last appeared in 2016. It was later revealed that Latvia placed eleventh in the semi-final, receiving a total of 34 points from public televoting; just three points away from qualification.

=== Voting ===
Below is a breakdown of points awarded to Latvia in the first semi-final. Voting during the three shows involved each country awarding sets of points from 1-8, 10 and 12: one from their professional jury and the other from televoting in the final vote, while the semi-final vote was based entirely on the vote of the public. The exact composition of the professional jury, and the results of each country's jury and televoting were released after the final. The Latvian jury consisted of Jānis Stībelis, Kristaps Vanadziņš, Aminata Savadogo, who represented Latvia in the Eurovision Song Contest 2015, and Asnate Rancāne. In the first semi-final, Latvia placed 11th with 34 points. This marked Latvia's sixth consecutive non-qualification to the grand final. Over the course of the contest, Latvia awarded its 12 points to Finland in the first semi-final, and to Estonia (jury) and Finland (televote) in the final.

==== Points awarded to Latvia ====
Points awarded to Latvia (Semi-final 1)
Score	Televote
12 points	
10 points	
8 points	Rest of the World
7 points	
6 points	Azerbaijan
5 points	
4 points	Ireland; Portugal
3 points	Finland; France
2 points	Serbia
1 point	Czech Republic; Germany; Moldova; Netherlands

==== Points awarded by Latvia ====
Points awarded by Latvia (Semi-final 1)
Score	Televote
12 points	Finland
10 points	Sweden
8 points	Israel
7 points	Croatia
6 points	Moldova
5 points	Czech Republic
4 points	Norway
3 points	Switzerland
2 points	Azerbaijan
1 point	Ireland

Points awarded by Latvia (Final)
Score	Televote	Jury
12 points	Finland	Estonia
10 points	Lithuania	Sweden
8 points	Sweden	Spain
7 points	Ukraine	Lithuania
6 points	Estonia	Cyprus
5 points	Israel	Israel
4 points	Croatia	Ukraine
3 points	Norway	Italy
2 points	Slovenia	Belgium
1 point	Czech Republic	Armenia

==== Detailed voting results ====
Each nation's jury consisted of five music industry professionals who are citizens of the country they represent, with their names published before the contest to ensure transparency. This jury judged each entry based on: vocal capacity; the stage performance; the song's composition and originality; and the overall impression by the act. In addition, no member of a national jury was permitted to be related in any way to any of the competing acts in such a way that they cannot vote impartially and independently. The individual rankings of each jury member as well as the nation's televoting results were released shortly after the grand final. Alongside Ireland, Latvia was one of two countries to appoint four jury members instead of five.

The following members comprised the Latvian jury:

- Jānis Stībelis
- Kristaps Vanadziņš
- Aminata Savadogo
- Asnate Rancāne

Detailed voting results from Latvia (Semi-final 1)
R/O	Country	Televote	
R/O	Country	Rank	Points
01	Norway	7	4
02	Malta	14	
03	Serbia	13	
04	Latvia		
05	Portugal	11	
06	Ireland	10	1
07	Croatia	4	7
08	Switzerland	8	3
09	Israel	3	8
10	Moldova	5	6
11	Sweden	2	10
12	Azerbaijan	9	2
13	Czech Republic	6	5
14	Netherlands	12	
15	Finland	1	12

Detailed voting results from Latvia (Final)
R/O	Country	Jury						Televote	
R/O	Country	Juror 1	Juror 2	Juror 3	Juror 4	Rank	Points	Rank	Points
01	Austria	12	13	7	18	13		21	
02	Portugal	13	10	9	26	15		23	
03	Switzerland	14	8	15	14	16		20	
04	Poland	16	20	25	19	24		16	
05	Serbia	25	25	12	20	21		18	
06	France	23	9	11	9	12		14	
07	Cyprus	4	7	16	6	5	6	22	
08	Spain	10	2	1	5	3	8	24	
09	Sweden	3	3	3	1	2	10	3	8
10	Albania	22	17	23	17	23		26	
11	Italy	5	6	24	10	8	3	15	
12	Estonia	1	1	4	2	1	12	5	6
13	Finland	24	11	21	21	19		1	12
14	Czech Republic	15	16	8	12	14		10	1
15	Australia	7	18	14	23	17		13	
16	Belgium	8	15	5	13	9	2	19	
17	Armenia	6	14	13	7	10	1	17	
18	Moldova	11	24	26	24	20		11	
19	Ukraine	17	23	6	3	7	4	4	7
20	Norway	18	19	17	25	22		8	3
21	Germany	21	21	19	22	26		12	
22	Lithuania	2	12	2	8	4	7	2	10
23	Israel	9	5	18	4	6	5	6	5
24	Slovenia	20	22	22	16	25		9	2
25	Croatia	26	4	20	15	11		7	4
26	United Kingdom	19	26	10	11	18		25	
