= Latvia in the Eurovision Song Contest 2027 =

- Eurovision Song Contest 2027
- Participating broadcaster: Latvian Public Service Media (LSM)
- Country: Latvia
- Selection process: Supernova 2027
- Selection date: February 2027

Participation chronology

Latvia is set to be represented at the Eurovision Song Contest 2027, which will be held in Burgas, Bulgaria. The Latvian participating broadcaster, Latvian Public Service Media (LSM), will organise the national final Supernova 2027 in order to select its entry for the contest.

== Background ==
Prior to the 2026 contest, Latvijas Televīzija (LTV) until 2024, and Latvian Public Service Media (LSM) since 2025, had participated in the Eurovision Song Contest representing Latvia 25 times since its first entry in 2000. It won the contest once in 2002 with the song "I Wanna" performed by Marie N. Following the introduction of semi-finals in 2004, it was able to qualify for the final between 2005 and 2008. Between 2009 and 2014, it failed to qualify to the final for six consecutive years before managing to qualify to the final in 2015 and 2016. Having once again failed to qualify to the final for six consecutive contests between 2017 and 2023, it managed to qualify to the final in 2024 with the song "Hollow" performed by Dons, placing 16th with a score of 64 points, and once again in 2025 with the song "Bur man laimi" performed by Tautumeitas, placing 13th with a score of 158 points.

As part of its duties as participating broadcaster, LSM organises the selection of its entry in the Eurovision Song Contest and broadcasts the event in the country. The broadcaster confirmed its intentions to participate at the 2027 contest on 24 July 2026. Since its debut in 2000 until 2012, LTV had organised the selection show Eirodziesma, which was rebranded and retooled as Dziesma in 2013 and 2014. Since 2015, LTV and LSM have organised the Supernova national final in order to select its entry. Along with its participation confirmation, the broadcaster announced that it would again organise Supernova in order to select its entry for 2027.

== Before Eurovision ==
=== Supernova 2027 ===
Supernova 2027 is set to be the twelfth edition of the national final format, being organised by LSM to select its entry for the Eurovision Song Contest 2027.

==== Competing entries ====
On 1 August 2026, LSM opened a song submission window for artists to apply, with the deadline set for 1 October 2026. At the end of the submission period, 125 entries had been received. The sixteen competing artists were selected by a jury composed of representatives of the Latvian music, event and television industry, as well as foreign professionals, and were announced on 20 November 2026. Among the selected competing artists are Laura Rizzotto, who represented Latvia in 2018, Katrīna Dimanta who represented Latvia in 2014 as part of Aarzemnieki, and Amanda Bašmakova, who represented Latvia in Junior Eurovision 2011 as a member of Elpo.

A 17th song will be selected as a wildcard by the public from the songs that finished 17th–24th in the jury vote. All eight songs competing for the wildcard will be played on Latvijas Radio 5.

Artist	Song	Songwriter(s)
Aģentūra	"Raudi"	Alexander Thomas Mathewson; Kurts Kārlis Mitenbergs
Blurie	"Cold as Ice"	Renārs Dagilis
Būū	"Wild Woman"	Ilze Fārte
Daba	"Promised Land"	Deniels Bērziņš; Tomasz Kaminski
Elpo	"Labākās dienas"	Amanda Bašmakova; Mārtiņš Makreckis
Idille	"About Love"	Gunārs Gaumigs; Jūlijs Melngailis; Kristiāns Kosītis; Paulis Filips Bārzdiņš; Ralfs Brieze; Rūdolfs Daņiļevičs
Kaligo	"Raganeņa"	Diāna Logina; Kristaps Karps
Katrīna Dimanta	"Inner Bear"	Armands Varslavāns; Katrīna Dimanta; Matīss Uškāns
Laura Rizzotto	"Suar (VII)"	Dolores Rizzotto; Karan Pandav; Kaspars Ansons; Laura Rizzotto
Legzdina	"Lelle"	Elīza Legzdiņa; Jānis Jačmenkins
Maarmaar	"Stāt"	Māra Upmane-Holšteine; Miks Pinzulis
Markus Riva	"Rēgs"	Markus Riva
Markuss	"Closer to the Cut"	Jēkabs Ludvigs Kalmanis; Lance Vought; Markuss Daniels Kolosovs
Marta	"Make It a Vibe"	Marta Grigale; Rebecca Le Montais
Tikasha Sakama	"Sexyish"	Dagnis Roziņš; Elsa Søllesvik; Jānis Pētersons; Lasse Nymann; Nansija Garkalne; Toms Jēkabs Kagainis
Yūt	"Somebody"	Emīls Deivids Zučiks; Matīss Jānis Berzinskis

==== Final ====
The final will take place on 6 February 2027 at the Xiaomi Arena in Riga. The final will be held in two parts. In the first round of voting the top three will advance to the superfinal based on the votes of a international jury (50%) and a public vote (50%). In the superfinal, the winner will be selected by the public vote.
