= X Faktors =

Latvian TV series

- Created by: Simon Cowell
- Presented by: Markus Riva
- Judges: Reinis Sējāns; Aija Auškāpa; Intars Busulis; Marats Ogļezņevs (2019–)
- Country of origin: Latvia
- Original language: Latvian
- No. of seasons: 6

Original release
- Network: TV3
- Release: 3 September 2017 – present

Related
- The X Factor (UK); Other international versions

X Faktors is the Latvian version of The X Factor, a series originating from the United Kingdom. Based on the original British show, the concept of the Latvian version, as is common with international installments, is to find new singing talent (solo or groups) contested by aspiring singers drawn from public auditions. The Latvian version first aired on 3 September 2017.

== Season summary ==
To date, six seasons have been broadcast, as summarised below.

Team Reinis Sējāns
Team Aija Auškāpa
Team Intars Busulis
Team Marats Ogļezņevs

Season	Start	Finish	Winner	Runner-up	Third place	Fourth place	Winning mentor	Main host	Main judges
1	3 September 2017	3 December 2017	Arturs Gruzdiņš	Līga Rīdere	Adriana Miglāne	Tautumeitas	Aija Auškāpa	Markus Riva	Reinis Sējāns; Aija Auškāpa; Intars Busulis
2	9 September 2018	16 December 2018	Kattie	Baritoni	Radio Trio	Didzis Melderis	Aija Auškāpa	Markus Riva	Reinis Sējāns; Aija Auškāpa; Intars Busulis
3	15 September 2019	15 December 2019	Elīna Gluzunova	Diāna Paško	Klāvs Ozols	Reinis Liepa	Reinis Sējāns	Markus Riva	Reinis Sējāns; Aija Auškāpa; Intars Busulis; Marats Ogļezņevs
4	12 September 2021	12 December 2021	Grēta Grantiņa	Viktors Buntovskis	Eduards Rediko	Diona Liepiņa	Intars Busulis	Markus Riva	Reinis Sējāns; Aija Auškāpa; Intars Busulis; Marats Ogļezņevs
5	24 September 2023	10 December 2023	Emilija Bērziņa	Luka	Katrīna Kovaļuka	Tipa	Aija Auškāpa	Markus Riva	Reinis Sējāns; Aija Auškāpa; Intars Busulis; Marats Ogļezņevs
6	28 September 2025	14 December 2025	Jurģis Namejs Zvejnieks	Lotte Eglīte	Dagmāra Laicāne	Markuss Daniels Kolosovs	Reinis Sējāns	Markus Riva	Reinis Sējāns; Aija Auškāpa; Intars Busulis; Marats Ogļezņevs

== Judges' categories and their contestants ==
In each season, each judge is allocated a category to mentor and chooses three acts to progress to the live finals. This table shows, for each season, which category each judge was allocated and which acts he or she put through to the live finals.

Key:

– Winning judge/category. Winners are in bold, eliminated contestants in small font.

Season	Reinis Sējāns	Aija Auškāpa	Intars Busulis	N/A
1	**Groups**; Tautumeitas; Hypnotic; The Stones; Koukie Band	**16-24s** **Arturs Gruzdiņš**; Adriana Miglāne; Alise Haijima; Lauris Bergmanis	**Over 25s** Līga Rīdere; Edgars Kreilis; Nadežda Maņkeviča; Aivo Oskis	N/A
2	**16-24s** Didzis Melderis; Roberts Memmēns; Anna Ušakova; Amanda Maržecka	**Over 25s** **Kattie**; Reinis Straume; Laima Dimanta; Oskars Millers	**Groups**; Baritoni; Radio Trio; Carnelian; Signe & Jānis	N/A
Season	Reinis Sējāns	Aija Auškāpa	Intars Busulis	Marats Ogļezņevs
3	**Over 25s** **Elīna Gluzunova**; Reinis Liepa; Pāvels Fomkins	**Girls**; Diāna Paško; Elīna Evelīna Jansone; Anna Krista Ostrovska	**Groups**; Rozes; The Gardens; Limonāde	**Boys**; Klāvs Ozols; Artis Zaķis; Kevin Dylan Feunang; Dagnis Roziņš
4	**Boys**; Viktors Buntovskis; Eduards Rediko; Tom Simo	**Groups**; We; Audiokvartāls; Neprāts	**Girls**; **Grēta Grantiņa**; Diona Liepiņa; Loreta Klibiķe	**Over 25s** Edgars Kārkliņš; Deniels Bērziņš; Olga Palušina
5	Luka; Reimaņi; Estere Tauriņa	**Emilija Bērziņa**; Bekars; Alise Gamula	Katrīna Kovaļuka; Jānis Miglāns; Daniels Širmanis	Tipa; Krišjānis Brasliņš; Patrīcija Spale
6	**Jurģis Namejs Zvejnieks**; Daryn Blank; Krista Špīse	Dagmāra Laicāne; Jānis Rugājs; Tikai Mēs	Markuss Daniels Kolosovs; Anastasija Cherneha; Skvirl'Boizz	Lotte Eglīte; Denijs Grieze; Niklāss

== Season 1 ==
=== Contestants ===
Key:

– Winner
– Runner-up
– Third Place

Category (mentor)	Acts			
16-24s (Auškāpa)	Lauris Bergmanis	Arturs Gruzdiņš	Alise Haijima	Adriana Miglāne
Over 25s (Busulis)	Edgars Kreilis	Nadežda Maņkeviča	Aivo Oskis	Līga Rīdere
Groups (Sējāns)	Hypnotic	Koukie Band	The Stones	Tautumeitas

=== Results summary ===
Colour key

–	Contestant was in the bottom two or three and had to sing again in the final showdown
–	Contestant was in the bottom two or three but was immediately eliminated
–	Contestant received the most public votes

Weekly results per contestant
Contestant	Week 1	Week 2	Week 3	Week 4	Week 5	Week 6	Week 7	Week 8	
Contestant	Week 1	Week 2	Week 3	Week 4	Week 5	Week 6	Week 7	Round 1	Round 2
Arturs Gruzdiņš	1st	1st	1st	1st	1st	2nd	2nd	1st	Winner
Līga Rīdere	3rd	2nd	2nd	2nd	4th	1st	1st	2nd	Runner-Up
Adriana Miglāne	5th	4th	9th	3rd	3rd	3rd	3rd	3rd	Eliminated (week 8)
Tautumeitas	2nd	9th	6th	4th	6th	5th	4th	Eliminated (week 7)	
Alise Haijima	10th	11th	5th	6th	2nd	4th	Eliminated (week 6)		
Edgars Kreilis	11th	3rd	3rd	5th	5th	Eliminated (week 5)			
Hypnotic	4th	6th	4th	7th	Eliminated (week 4)				
The Stones	6th	8th	7th	8th	Eliminated (week 4)				
Koukie Band	7th	5th	8th	Eliminated (week 3)					
Lauris Bergmanis	9th	7th	10th	Eliminated (week 3)					
Nadežda Maņkeviča	8th	10th	Eliminated (week 2)						
Aivo Oskis	12th	Eliminated (week 1)							
Final showdown	Edgars Kreilis, Aivo Oskis	Alise Haijima, Nadežda Maņkeviča	Adriana Miglāne, Koukie Band	Alise Haijima, Hypnotic	Edgars Kreilis, Tautumeitas	Alise Haijima, Tautumeitas	Adriana Miglāne, Tautumeitas	No final showdown or judges' vote: results are based on public votes alone	
Judges voted to eliminate:	Eliminate							No final showdown or judges' vote: results are based on public votes alone	
Sējāns's vote	Aivo Oskis	Nadežda Maņkeviča	Adriana Miglāne	Alise Haijima	Edgars Kreilis	Alise Haijima	Adriana Miglāne	No final showdown or judges' vote: results are based on public votes alone	
Auškāpa's vote	Edgars Kreilis	Nadežda Maņkeviča	Koukie Band	Hypnotic	Edgars Kreilis	Tautumeitas	Tautumeitas	No final showdown or judges' vote: results are based on public votes alone	
Busulis's vote	Aivo Oskis	Alise Haijima	Koukie Band	Hypnotic	Tautumeitas	Alise Haijima	Tautumeitas	No final showdown or judges' vote: results are based on public votes alone	
Eliminated	Aivo Oskis; 2 of 3 votes Majority	Nadežda Maņkeviča; 2 of 3 votes Majority	Lauris Bergmanis; Public vote	The Stones; Public vote	Edgars Kreilis; 2 of 3 votes Majority	Alise Haijima; 2 of 3 votes Majority	Tautumeitas; 2 of 3 votes Majority	Adriana Miglāne; Public vote to win	Līga Rīdere; Public vote to win
Eliminated	Aivo Oskis; 2 of 3 votes Majority	Nadežda Maņkeviča; 2 of 3 votes Majority	Koukie Band; 2 of 3 votes Majority	Hypnotic; 2 of 3 votes Majority	Edgars Kreilis; 2 of 3 votes Majority	Alise Haijima; 2 of 3 votes Majority	Tautumeitas; 2 of 3 votes Majority	Adriana Miglāne; Public vote to win	Līga Rīdere; Public vote to win

== Season 2 ==
=== Contestants ===
Key:

– Winner
– Runner-up
– Third Place

Category (mentor)	Acts			
16-24s (Sējāns)	Amanda Maržecka	Didzis Melderis	Roberts Memmēns	Anna Ušakova
Over 25s (Auškāpa)	Laima Dimanta	Kattie	Oskars Millers	Reinis Straume
Groups (Busulis)	Baritoni	Carnelian	Radio Trio	Signe & Jānis

=== Results summary ===
Colour key

–	Contestant was in the bottom two or three and had to sing again in the final showdown
–	Contestant was in the bottom two or three but was immediately eliminated
–	Contestant received the most public votes

Weekly results per contestant
Contestant	Week 1	Week 2	Week 3	Week 4	Week 5	Week 6	Week 7	Week 8	
Contestant	Week 1	Week 2	Week 3	Week 4	Week 5	Week 6	Week 7	Round 1	Round 2
Kattie	9th	7th	9th	1st	1st	2nd	1st	1st	Winner
Baritoni	1st	2nd	4th	5th	2nd	4th	2nd	2nd	Runner-Up
Radio Trio	6th	1st	2nd	4th	5th	1st	3rd	3rd	Eliminated (week 8)
Didzis Melderis	4th	3rd	7th	2nd	4th	3rd	4th	Eliminated (week 7)	
Carnelian	2nd	4th	1st	3rd	3rd	5th	Eliminated (week 6)		
Roberts Memmēns	10th	11th	5th	6th	6th	Eliminated (week 5)			
Signe & Jānis	3rd	5th	6th	7th	Eliminated (week 4)				
Reinis Straume	8th	6th	3rd	8th	Eliminated (week 4)				
Laima Dimanta	5th	8th	8th	Eliminated (week 3)					
Anna Ušakova	7th	9th	10th	Eliminated (week 3)					
Amanda Maržecka	11th	10th	Eliminated (week 2)						
Oskars Millers	12th	Eliminated (week 1)							
Final showdown	Amanda Maržecka, Oskars Millers	Amanda Maržecka, Roberts Memmēns	Kattie, Laima Dimanta	Roberts Memmēns, Signe & Jānis	Roberts Memmēns, Radio Trio	Baritoni, Carnelian	Didzis Melderis, Radio Trio	No final showdown or judges' vote: results are based on public votes alone	
Judges voted to:	Eliminate							No final showdown or judges' vote: results are based on public votes alone	
Sējāns's vote	Oskars Millers	Amanda Maržecka	Kattie	Signe & Jānis	Radio Trio	Baritoni	Radio Trio	No final showdown or judges' vote: results are based on public votes alone	
Auškāpa's vote	Amanda Maržecka	Amanda Maržecka	Laima Dimanta	Signe & Jānis	Roberts Memmēns	Carnelian	Didzis Melderis	No final showdown or judges' vote: results are based on public votes alone	
Busulis's vote	Oskars Millers	Roberts Memmēns	Laima Dimanta	Roberts Memmēns	Roberts Memmēns	Carnelian	Didzis Melderis	No final showdown or judges' vote: results are based on public votes alone	
Eliminated	Oskars Millers; 2 of 3 votes Majority	Amanda Maržecka; 2 of 3 votes Majority	Anna Ušakova; Public vote	Reinis Straume; Public vote	Roberts Memmēns; 2 of 3 votes Majority	Carnelian; 2 of 3 votes Majority	Didzis Melderis; 2 of 3 votes Majority	Radio Trio; Public vote to win	Baritoni; Public vote to win
Eliminated	Oskars Millers; 2 of 3 votes Majority	Amanda Maržecka; 2 of 3 votes Majority	Laima Dimanta; 2 of 3 votes Majority	Signe & Jānis; 2 of 3 votes Majority	Roberts Memmēns; 2 of 3 votes Majority	Carnelian; 2 of 3 votes Majority	Didzis Melderis; 2 of 3 votes Majority	Radio Trio; Public vote to win	Baritoni; Public vote to win

== Season 3 ==
=== Contestants ===
Key:

– Winner
– Runner-up
– Third Place

Category (mentor)	Acts			
Boys (Ogļezņevs)	Kevin Dylan Feunang	Klāvs Ozols	Dagnis Roziņš	Artis Zaķis
Girls (Auškāpa)	Elīna Evelīna Jansone	Anna Krista Ostrovska	Diāna Paško	
Over 25s (Sējāns)	Pāvels Fomkins	Elīna Gluzunova	Reinis Liepa	
Groups (Busulis)	The Gardens	Limonāde	Rozes	

=== Results summary ===
Colour key

–	Contestant was in the bottom two or three and had to sing again in the final showdown
–	Contestant was in the bottom two or three but was immediately eliminated
–	Contestant received the most public votes

Weekly results per contestant
Contestant	Week 1		Week 2	Week 3	Week 4	Week 5	Week 6	Week 7	
Contestant	Wildcard vote	Elimination vote	Week 2	Week 3	Week 4	Week 5	Week 6	Round 1	Round 2
Elīna Gluzunova	—N/a	8th	9th	8th	2nd	1st	1st	1st	Winner
Diāna Paško	—N/a	1st	2nd	7th	1st	3rd	3rd	2nd	Runner-Up
Klāvs Ozols	—N/a	6th	4th	4th	3rd	4th	2nd	3rd	Eliminated (week 7)
Reinis Liepa	—N/a	12th	3rd	6th	4th	2nd	4th	Eliminated (week 6)	
Artis Zaķis	—N/a	5th	6th	3rd	7th	5th	Eliminated (week 5)		
Rozes	—N/a	10th	11th	2nd	5th	6th	Eliminated (week 5)		
Elīna Evelīna Jansone	—N/a	2nd	1st	1st	6th	Eliminated (week 4)			
Anna Krista Ostrovska	—N/a	3rd	5th	5th	8th	Eliminated (week 4)			
The Gardens	—N/a	9th	8th	9th	Eliminated (week 3)				
Limonāde	—N/a	7th	7th	10th	Eliminated (week 3)				
Kevin Dylan Feunang	1st 35.0%	4th	10th	Eliminated (week 2)					
Dagnis Roziņš	—N/a	11th	12th	Eliminated (week 2)					
Pāvels Fomkins	—N/a	13th	Eliminated (week 1)						
Akvelīna Mārtinsone	2nd 29.0%	—N/a	Not returned (week 1)						
Alekss Silvērs	3rd 18.9%	—N/a	Not returned (week 1)						
CA Band	4th 17.1%	—N/a	Not returned (week 1)						
Final showdown	N/A	Pāvels Fomkins, Reinis Liepa	Kevin Dylan Feunang, Rozes	The Gardens, Elīna Gluzunova	Elīna Evelīna Jansone, Artis Zaķis	Klāvs Ozols, Artis Zaķis	Reinis Liepa, Diāna Paško	No final showdown or judges' vote: results are based on public votes alone	
Judges voted to:	N/A	Eliminate						No final showdown or judges' vote: results are based on public votes alone	
Sējāns's vote	N/A	Pāvels Fomkins	Kevin Dylan Feunang	The Gardens	Elīna Evelīna Jansone	Artis Zaķis	Diāna Paško	No final showdown or judges' vote: results are based on public votes alone	
Auškāpa's vote	N/A	Reinis Liepa	Kevin Dylan Feunang	The Gardens	Artis Zaķis	Artis Zaķis	Reinis Liepa	No final showdown or judges' vote: results are based on public votes alone	
Ogļezņevs's vote	N/A	Pāvels Fomkins	Rozes	The Gardens	Elīna Evelīna Jansone	abstained	Reinis Liepa	No final showdown or judges' vote: results are based on public votes alone	
Busulis's vote	N/A	Pāvels Fomkins	Kevin Dylan Feunang	Elīna Gluzunova	Elīna Evelīna Jansone	Artis Zaķis	Diāna Paško	No final showdown or judges' vote: results are based on public votes alone	
Eliminated	N/A	Pāvels Fomkins; 3 of 4 votes Majority	Dagnis Roziņš; Public vote	Limonāde; Public vote	Anna Krista Ostrovska; Public vote	Rozes; Public vote	Reinis Liepa; 2 of 4 votes Deadlock	Klāvs Ozols; Public vote to win	Diāna Paško; Public vote to win
Eliminated	N/A	Pāvels Fomkins; 3 of 4 votes Majority	Kevin Dylan Feunang; 3 of 4 votes Majority	The Gardens; 3 of 4 votes Majority	Elīna Evelīna Jansone; 3 of 4 votes Majority	Artis Zaķis; 3 of 4 votes Majority	Reinis Liepa; 2 of 4 votes Deadlock	Klāvs Ozols; Public vote to win	Diāna Paško; Public vote to win

== Season 4 ==
=== Contestants ===
Key:

– Winner
– Runner-up
– Third Place

Category (mentor)	Acts		
Boys (Sējāns)	Viktors Buntovskis	Eduards Rediko	Tom Simo
Girls (Busulis)	Grēta Grantiņa	Loreta Klibiķe	Diona Liepiņa
Over 25s (Ogļezņevs)	Deniels Bērziņš	Edgars Kārkliņš	Olga Palušina
Groups (Auškāpa)	Audiokvartāls	Neprāts	We

=== Results summary ===
Colour key

–	Contestant was in the bottom two or three and had to sing again in the final showdown
–	Contestant was in the bottom two or three but was immediately eliminated
–	Contestant received the most public votes

Weekly results per contestant
Contestant	Week 1	Week 2	Week 3	Week 4	Week 5	Week 6	
Contestant	Week 1	Week 2	Week 3	Week 4	Week 5	Round 1	Round 2
Grēta Grantiņa	7th	2nd	4th	1st	2nd	1st	Winner
Viktors Buntovskis	1st	4th	5th	2nd	1st	2nd	Runner-Up
Eduards Rediko	9th	7th	3rd	3rd	4th	3rd	Eliminated (week 6)
Diona Liepiņa	2nd	1st	1st	4th	3rd	Eliminated (week 5)	
Edgars Kārkliņš	3rd	5th	2nd	5th	Eliminated (week 4)		
Deniels Bērziņš	8th	6th	7th	6th	Eliminated (week 4)		
We	10th	3rd	6th	Eliminated (week 3)			
Olga Palušina	6th	9th	8th	Eliminated (week 3)			
Audiokvartāls	4th	8th	Eliminated (week 2)				
Loreta Klibiķe	5th	10th	Eliminated (week 2)				
Tom Simo	11th	Eliminated (week 1)					
Neprāts	12th	Eliminated (week 1)					
Final showdown	Tom Simo, We	Audiokvartāls, Olga Palušina	Deniels Bērziņš, We	Edgars Kārkliņš, Diona Liepiņa	Diona Liepiņa, Eduards Rediko	No final showdown or judges' vote: results are based on public votes alone	
Judges voted to:	Eliminate					No final showdown or judges' vote: results are based on public votes alone	
Sējāns's vote	We	Audiokvartāls	We	Edgars Kārkliņš	Diona Liepiņa	No final showdown or judges' vote: results are based on public votes alone	
Auškāpa's vote	Tom Simo	Olga Palušina	Deniels Bērziņš	Edgars Kārkliņš	Diona Liepiņa	No final showdown or judges' vote: results are based on public votes alone	
Ogļezņevs's vote	Tom Simo	Audiokvartāls	We	Diona Liepiņa	Eduards Rediko	No final showdown or judges' vote: results are based on public votes alone	
Busulis's vote	Tom Simo	Audiokvartāls	Deniels Bērziņš	Edgars Kārkliņš	Eduards Rediko	No final showdown or judges' vote: results are based on public votes alone	
Eliminated	Neprāts; Public vote	Loreta Klibiķe; Public vote	Olga Palušina; Public vote	Deniels Bērziņš; Public vote	Diona Liepiņa; 2 of 4 votes Lifeline vote	Eduards Rediko; Public vote to win	Viktors Buntovskis; Public vote to win
Eliminated	Tom Simo; 3 of 4 votes Majority	Audiokvartāls; 3 of 4 votes Majority	We; 2 of 4 votes Lifeline vote	Edgars Kārkliņš; 3 of 4 votes Majority	Diona Liepiņa; 2 of 4 votes Lifeline vote	Eduards Rediko; Public vote to win	Viktors Buntovskis; Public vote to win

== Season 5 ==
=== Contestants ===
Key:

– Winner
– Runner-up
– Third Place
– Withdrew

Mentor	Acts		
Reinis Sējāns	Luka	Reimaņi	Estere Tauriņa
Aija Auškāpa	Bekars	Emilija Bērziņa	Alise Gamula
Intars Busulis	Katrīna Kovaļuka	Jānis Miglāns	Daniels Širmanis
Marats Ogļezņevs	Krišjānis Brasliņš	Patrīcija Spale	Tipa

=== Results summary ===
Colour key

–	Contestant was in the bottom two, three or four and had to sing again in the final showdown
–	Contestant was in the bottom three or four but was immediately eliminated
–	Contestant received the most public votes

Weekly results per contestant
Contestant	Week 1	Week 2	Week 3	Week 4	Week 5	
Contestant	Week 1	Week 2	Week 3	Week 4	Round 1	Round 2
Emilija Bērziņa	Safe	Safe	Safe	Safe	Safe	Winner
Luka	Safe	Safe	Safe	Safe	Safe	Runner-up
Katrīna Kovaļuka	Safe	Safe	Safe	Bottom three	3rd	Eliminated (week 5)
Tipa	Safe	Bottom three	Bottom two	Bottom three	Eliminated (week 4)	
Krišjānis Brasliņš	Bottom four	Safe	Safe	5th	Eliminated (week 4)	
Bekars	Safe	Safe	Bottom two	Eliminated (week 3)		
Jānis Miglāns	Safe	Safe	Withdrew (week 3)			
Daniels Širmanis	Safe	Bottom three	Eliminated (week 2)			
Patrīcija Spale	Safe	9th	Eliminated (week 2)			
Reimaņi	Bottom four	Eliminated (week 1)				
Estere Tauriņa	11-12th	Eliminated (week 1)				
Alise Gamula	11-12th	Eliminated (week 1)				
Final showdown	Krišjānis Brasliņš, Reimaņi	Daniels Širmanis, Tipa	Bekars, Tipa	Katrīna Kovaļuka, Tipa	No final showdown or judges' vote: results are based on public votes alone	
Judges voted to:	Eliminate				No final showdown or judges' vote: results are based on public votes alone	
Sējāns's vote	Krišjānis Brasliņš	Daniels Širmanis	Bekars	Katrīna Kovaļuka	No final showdown or judges' vote: results are based on public votes alone	
Auškāpa's vote	Reimaņi	Daniels Širmanis	Tipa	Tipa	No final showdown or judges' vote: results are based on public votes alone	
Ogļezņevs's vote	Reimaņi	Daniels Širmanis	Bekars	Katrīna Kovaļuka	No final showdown or judges' vote: results are based on public votes alone	
Busulis's vote	Reimaņi	Tipa	Tipa	Tipa	No final showdown or judges' vote: results are based on public votes alone	
Eliminated	Estere Tauriņa; Public vote Alise Gamula; Public vote	Patrīcija Spale; Public vote	Bekars; 2 of 4 votes Lifeline vote	Krišjānis Brasliņš; Public vote	Katrīna Kovaļuka; Public vote to win	Luka; Public vote to win
Eliminated	Reimaņi; 3 of 4 votes Majority	Daniels Širmanis; 3 of 4 votes Majority	Bekars; 2 of 4 votes Lifeline vote	Tipa; 2 of 4 votes Lifeline vote	Katrīna Kovaļuka; Public vote to win	Luka; Public vote to win

== Season 6 ==
=== Contestants ===
Key:

– Winner
– Runner-up
– Third Place

Mentor	Acts		
Reinis Sējāns	Daryn Blank	Krista Špīse	Jurģis Namejs Zvejnieks
Aija Auškāpa	Dagmāra Laicāne	Jānis Rugājs	Tikai Mēs
Intars Busulis	Anastasija Cherneha	Markuss Daniels Kolosovs	Skvirl'Boizz
Marats Ogļezņevs	Lotte Eglīte	Denijs Grieze	Niklāss

=== Results summary ===
Colour key

–	Contestant was in the bottom three or four and had to sing again in the final showdown
–	Contestant was in the bottom three or four but was immediately eliminated
–	Contestant received the most public votes

Weekly results per contestant
Contestant	Week 1	Week 2	Week 3	Week 4	Week 5	
Contestant	Week 1	Week 2	Week 3	Week 4	Round 1	Round 2
Jurģis Namejs Zvejnieks	Safe	Safe	Safe	Safe	Safe	Winner
Lotte Eglīte	Safe	Safe	Bottom three	Safe	Safe	Runner-up
Dagmāra Laicāne	Safe	Safe	Safe	Bottom three	3rd	Eliminated (week 5)
Markuss Daniels Kolosovs	Safe	Safe	Safe	Bottom three	Eliminated (week 4)	
Jānis Rugājs	Bottom four	Safe	Safe	5th	Eliminated (week 4)	
Tikai Mēs	Safe	Safe	Bottom three	Eliminated (week 3)		
Anastasija Cherneha	Safe	Bottom three	7th	Eliminated (week 3)		
Skvirl'Boizz	Safe	Bottom three	Eliminated (week 2)			
Denijs Grieze	Safe	9th	Eliminated (week 2)			
Niklāss	Bottom four	Eliminated (week 1)				
Daryn Blank	11-12th	Eliminated (week 1)				
Krista Špīse	11-12th	Eliminated (week 1)				
Final showdown	Niklāss, Jānis Rugājs	Anastasija Cherneha, Skvirl'Boizz	Lotte Eglīte, Tikai Mēs	Dagmāra Laicāne, Markuss Daniels Kolosovs	No final showdown or judges' vote: results are based on public votes alone	
Judges voted to:	Eliminate				No final showdown or judges' vote: results are based on public votes alone	
Sējāns's vote	Niklāss	Skvirl'Boizz	Tikai Mēs	Markuss Daniels Kolosovs	No final showdown or judges' vote: results are based on public votes alone	
Auškāpa's vote	Niklāss	Skvirl'Boizz	Lotte Eglīte	Markuss Daniels Kolosovs	No final showdown or judges' vote: results are based on public votes alone	
Ogļezņevs's vote	Jānis Rugājs	Skvirl'Boizz	Tikai Mēs	Dagmāra Laicāne	No final showdown or judges' vote: results are based on public votes alone	
Busulis's vote	Niklāss	Skvirl'Boizz	Tikai Mēs	Dagmāra Laicāne	No final showdown or judges' vote: results are based on public votes alone	
Eliminated	Daryn Blank; Public vote Krista Špīse; Public vote	Denijs Grieze; Public vote	Anastasija Cherneha; Public vote	Jānis Rugājs; Public vote	Dagmāra Laicāne; Public vote to win	Lotte Eglīte; Public vote to win
Eliminated	Niklāss; 3 of 4 votes Majority	Skvirl'Boizz; 4 of 4 votes Majority	Tikai Mēs; 3 of 4 votes Majority	Markuss Daniels Kolosovs; 2 of 4 votes Lifeline vote	Dagmāra Laicāne; Public vote to win	Lotte Eglīte; Public vote to win

== Trivia ==
Both Roberts Memmēns and Dagnis Roziņš are current members of the pop-rap group Citi Zēni, who gained popularity as the Latvian entry for 2022 Eurovision Song Contest with the song, Eat Your Salad.
