= Latvia in the Eurovision Song Contest 2022 =

- Eurovision Song Contest 2022
- Country: Latvia
- Selection process: Supernova 2022
- Selection date: 12 February 2022

Competing entry
- Song: "Eat Your Salad"
- Artist: Citi Zēni
- Songwriters: Roberts Memmēns; Jānis Pētersons; Dagnis Roziņš; Jānis Jačmenkins

Placement
- Semi-final result: Failed to qualify (14th)

Participation chronology

Latvia was represented at the Eurovision Song Contest 2022 with the song "Eat Your Salad" performed by Citi Zēni. The Latvian broadcaster Latvijas Televīzija (LTV) organised the national final Supernova 2022 in order to select the Latvian entry for the contest. 17 songs were selected to compete in the national final, which consisted of two shows: a semi-final and a final. In the semi-final on 5 February 2022, ten entries were selected to advance alongside a wildcard selected by LTV. Eleven songs ultimately qualified to compete in the final on 12 February 2022 where a public televote and a seven-member jury panel selected "Eat Your Salad" performed by Citi Zēni as the winner.

Latvia was drawn to compete in the first semi-final of the Eurovision Song Contest which took place on 10 May 2022. Performing during the show in position 2, "Eat Your Salad" was not announced among the top 10 entries of the first semi-final and therefore did not qualify to compete in the final. It was later revealed that Latvia placed fourteenth out of the 17 participating countries in the semi-final with 55 points.

== Background ==
Prior to the 2022 contest, Latvia has participated in the Eurovision Song Contest twenty-one times since its first entry in 2000. Latvia won the contest once in 2002 with the song "I Wanna" performed by Marie N. Following the introduction of semi-finals for the 2004, Latvia was able to qualify to compete in the final between 2005 and 2008. Between 2009 and 2014, the nation had failed to qualify to the final for six consecutive years before managing to qualify to the final in 2015 and 2016. Latvia had failed to qualify to the final for four consecutive years since 2017 including with their 2021 entry "The Moon Is Rising" performed by Samanta Tīna.

The Latvian national broadcaster, Latvijas Televīzija (LTV), broadcasts the event within Latvia and organises the selection process for the nation's entry. LTV confirmed their intentions to participate at the 2022 Eurovision Song Contest on 30 August 2021. Latvia has selected their entries for the Eurovision Song Contest through a national final, with the exception of 2021 when the Latvian entry was internally selected. Since their debut in 2000 until 2012, LTV had organised the selection show Eirodziesma. In a response to the nation's failure to qualify to the final at Eurovision since 2008, between 2013 and 2014, the competition was rebranded and retooled as Dziesma. After failing to produce successful entries those two years, LTV developed and had organised the Supernova national final since 2015. Along with their participation confirmation, the broadcaster announced that they would return with organising Supernova 2022 in order to select the Latvian entry for the 2022 contest.

== Before Eurovision ==
=== Supernova 2022 ===
Supernova 2022 was the seventh edition of Supernova, the music competition that selects Latvia's entries for the Eurovision Song Contest. The competition commenced with the semi-final on 5 February 2022 and concluded with a final on 12 February 2022. All shows in the competition took place at the LTV studios in Riga, hosted by Ketija Šēnberga and 2003 Latvian Eurovision entrant Lauris Reiniks and broadcast on LTV1 as well as online via the streaming platform Replay.lv. An alternative broadcast also occurred on LTV7 with presentation in sign language.

==== Format ====
The format of the competition consisted of two shows: a semi-final and a final. The semi-final, held on 5 February 2022, featured seventeen competing entries from which the top ten advanced to the final from each show. LTV also advanced a wildcard act to the final from the remaining non-qualifying entries in the semi-final. The final, held on 12 February 2022, selected the Latvian entry for Turin from the remaining eleven entries. Results during the semi-final and final shows were determined by the 50/50 combination of votes from a jury panel and a public vote, with both the jury and public vote assigning points from 1-8, 10 and 12 based on the number of competing songs in the respective show. Ties were decided in favour of the entries that received higher points from the public. Viewers were able to vote via telephone or via SMS.

The jury voted in each show and selected entries to advance in the competition. The panel consisted of:

- Anna Platpīre – content editor at LTV
- Māris Mihelsons – musician
- Laura Jēkabsone – composer and singer
- Toms Grēviņš – radio DJ and television presenter
- Ilya Lagutenko – Russian musician, represented Russia in the Eurovision Song Contest 2001 as member of Mumiy Troll
- Nicolau Tudela – Portuguese artistic television director
- Julian Guiterrez – French television director

==== Competing entries ====
Artists and songwriters were able to submit their entries to the broadcaster between 7 October 2021 and 7 December 2021. A record 130 entries were submitted at the conclusion of the submission period. A jury panel appointed by LTV evaluated the submitted songs and selected sixteen performers and songs, which were announced on 5 January 2022. Among the artists were Reinis Sējāns (member of Bujāns) who represented Latvia in the Eurovision Song Contest 2006 as part of Cosmos, Intars Busulis (member of Bujāns) who represented Latvia in the Eurovision Song Contest 2009, Emīls Balceris and Marats Ogļezņevs (members of Bermudu Divstūris) who both represented Latvia in the Eurovision Song Contest 2011 as Musiqq, Ralfs Eilands (member of Mēs Jūs Mīlam) who represented Latvia in the Eurovision Song Contest 2013 as part of PeR, and Aminata who represented Latvia in the Eurovision Song Contest 2015. An additional entry, "I'm Just a Sinner" performed by Miks Galvanovskis, was announced on 15 January 2022 following an online vote among ten entries on the official Supernova website between 10 and 14 January 2022. Among the artists competing in the online vote was Katrīna Dimanta who represented Latvia in the Eurovision Song Contest 2014 as part of Aarzemnieki.

Online vote – 10–14 January 2022
Artist	Song	Songwriter(s)
Antra Stafecka and Atis Ieviņš	"Call the Lights"	Antra Stafecka, Atis Ieviņš, Oskars Deigelis
Dārta Stepanova	"Brīnumzeme"	Valters Pūce, Patrīcija Ksenija Cuprijanoviča
Edvards Strazdiņš	"Open Road"	Edvards Strazdiņš, Kerija Hauptmane
Katrīna Dimanta	"My Voice"	Katrīna Dimanta, Reinis Briģis
Marta Ritova	"Let Me Go"	Marta Ritova, Armands Varslavāns
Mārtiņš Strods	"One More Time"	Mārtiņš Strods, Evija Smagare
Miks Galvanovskis	"I'm Just a Sinner"	Miks Galvanovskis, Reinis Briģis
Rihards Bērziņš	"1+1"	Rihards Bērziņš
Tētis	"Labākie vārdi"	Nauris Brikmanis, Valters Osis
Toms Kalderauskis	"Naked Smile"	Liene Stūrmane, Kaspars Ansons, Toms Kalderauskis

Artist	Song	Songwriter(s)
Aminata	"I'm Letting You Go"	Aminata Savadogo
Beatrise Heislere	"On the Way Home"	Edvards Grieze, Beatrise Heislere
Bermudu Divstūris	"Bad"	Marats Ogļezņevs
Bujāns	"He, She, You & Me"	Intars Busulis, Reinis Sējāns, Marts Pujāts, Jānis Šipkēvics
Citi Zēni	"Eat Your Salad"	Roberts Memmēns, Jānis Pētersons, Dagnis Roziņš, Jānis Jačmenkins
Elīna Gluzunova	"Es pabiju tur"	Jānis Šipkēvics, Marts Pujāts
Inspo	"A Happy Place"	Nadīna Stirniniece, Aivars Lietaunieks
Katō	"Promises"	Kaspars Ansons, Anna Zankovska
Linda Rušeniece	"Pay My Own Bills"	Ralfs Eilands, Rūdolfs Ozols, Valters Sprūdžs
Markus Riva	"If You're Gonna Love Me"	Markus Riva
Mēs Jūs Mīlam	"Rich Itch"	Rūdolfs Ozols, Valters Sprūdžs, Ralfs Eilands
Miks Dukurs	"First Love"	Miks Dukurs
Miks Galvanovskis	"I'm Just a Sinner"	Miks Galvanovskis, Reinis Briģis
Patriks Peterson	"Can't Get You Outta My Head"	Elviss Pētersons
Raum	"Plans"	Daniel Levi Viinalass, Reinis Straume, Arnis Račinskis
The Coco'nuts	"In and Out of the Dark"	Marija Valmiera, Pēteris Narubins, Toms Valmiers, Monta Kurme, Benijs Zeltkalis, Artūrs Strautmanis
Zelma	"How"	Arturs Liede, Andrjus Jaņuns, Arta Zelma Jēgere

==== Semi-final ====
The semi-final took place on 5 February 2022. In the semi-final seventeen acts competed and the top ten entries qualified to the final based on the combination of votes from a jury panel and the Latvian public. On 10 February 2022, LTV announced that the song "First Love" performed by Miks Dukurs had been awarded a wildcard to qualify to the final due to technical issues that impacted his semi-final performance.

Qualifier Wildcard

Semi-final – 5 February 2022
R/O	Artist	Song	Result
1	Citi Zēni	"Eat Your Salad"	Qualified
2	Miks Dukurs	"First Love"	Qualified
3	Linda Rušeniece	"Pay My Own Bills"	Qualified
4	Elīna Gluzunova	"Es pabiju tur"	Qualified
5	Raum	"Plans"	Qualified
6	Patriks Peterson	"Can't Get You Outta My Head"	—N/a
7	Mēs Jūs Mīlam	"Rich Itch"	Qualified
8	Katō	"Promises"	—N/a
9	Miks Galvanovskis	"I'm Just a Sinner"	Qualified
10	Markus Riva	"If You're Gonna Love Me"	—N/a
11	The Coco'nuts	"In and Out of the Dark"	—N/a
12	Aminata	"I'm Letting You Go"	Qualified
13	Bermudu Divstūris	"Bad"	Qualified
14	Beatrise Heislere	"On the Way Home"	—N/a
15	Zelma	"How"	—N/a
16	Bujāns	"He, She, You & Me"	Qualified
17	Inspo	"A Happy Place"	Qualified

==== Final ====
The final took place on 12 February 2022. The eleven entries that qualified from the semi-final competed. The song with the highest number of votes based on the combination of votes from a jury panel and the Latvian public, "Eat Your Salad" performed by Citi Zēni, was declared the winner. In addition to the performances of the competing entries, the show featured guest performances by 2021 Estonian Eurovision entrant Uku Suviste and 2021 Lithuanian Eurovision entrant The Roop.

Final – 12 February 2022
R/O	Artist	Song	Jury rank	Televote		Place
R/O	Artist	Song	Jury rank	Votes	Rank	Place
1	Miks Dukurs	"First Love"	11	2,116	11	11
2	Raum	"Plans"	6	3,486	9	9
3	Linda Rušeniece	"Pay My Own Bills"	5	3,394	10	10
4	Bermudu Divstūris	"Bad"	9	24,216	5	7
5	Miks Galvanovskis	"I'm Just a Sinner"	4	16,060	6	4
6	Bujāns	"He, She, You & Me"	8	38,924	2	3
7	Elīna Gluzunova	"Es pabiju tur"	3	3,572	8	5
8	Citi Zēni	"Eat Your Salad"	1	50,566	1	1
9	Inspo	"A Happy Place"	7	6,432	7	8
10	Mēs Jūs Mīlam	"Rich Itch"	10	26,692	4	6
11	Aminata	"I'm Letting You Go"	2	30,983	3	2

==== Ratings ====
Viewing figures by show
Show	Air date	Viewing figures		Ref.
Show	Air date	Nominal	Share	Ref.
Semi-final	5 February 2022	149,200	8.2%	
Final	12 February 2022	154,900	8.5%	

=== Preparation ===
On 22 March, Citi Zēni released the official music video for "Eat Your Salad", which was directed by Niklāvs Vētra, produced by Mārtiņš Goldbergs and Elīna Sargune, and choreographed by Beāte Svarinska with support from the Riga Tourism Development Bureau LiveRiga.

=== Promotion ===
Citi Zēni made several appearances across Europe to specifically promote "Eat Your Salad" as the Latvian Eurovision entry. On 26 March, Citi Zēni performed during the Barcelona Eurovision Party, which was held at the Sala Apolo venue in Barcelona, Spain and hosted by Sharonne and Giuseppe Di Bella. On 3 April, Citi Zēni performed during the London Eurovision Party, which was held at the Hard Rock Hotel in London, United Kingdom and hosted by Paddy O'Connell and SuRie. On 7 April, Citi Zēni performed during the Israel Calling event held at the Menora Mivtachim Arena in Tel Aviv, Israel. On 9 April, Citi Zēni performed during the Eurovision in Concert event which was held at the AFAS Live venue in Amsterdam, Netherlands and hosted by Cornald Maas and Edsilia Rombley. On 16 April, Citi Zēni performed during the PrePartyES 2022 event which was held at the Sala La Riviera venue in Madrid, Spain and hosted by Ruth Lorenzo. On 30 April, Citi Zēni performed during the Adriatic PreParty which was held online and organised by Hrvatski Eurovizijski Klub.

In addition to their international appearances, Citi Zēni appeared during the Zelta Mikrofons 2022 award show on 26 February, held at the Art and Media Technical School in Riga where they received the ELVI Song of the Year award for their song "Limuzīns Uz Krīta". The band also released several acoustic and drum covers of former and 2022 Eurovision songs prior to the contest, including a performance recreation of the 2002 Latvian winning entry "I Wanna" performed by Marie N.

== At Eurovision ==
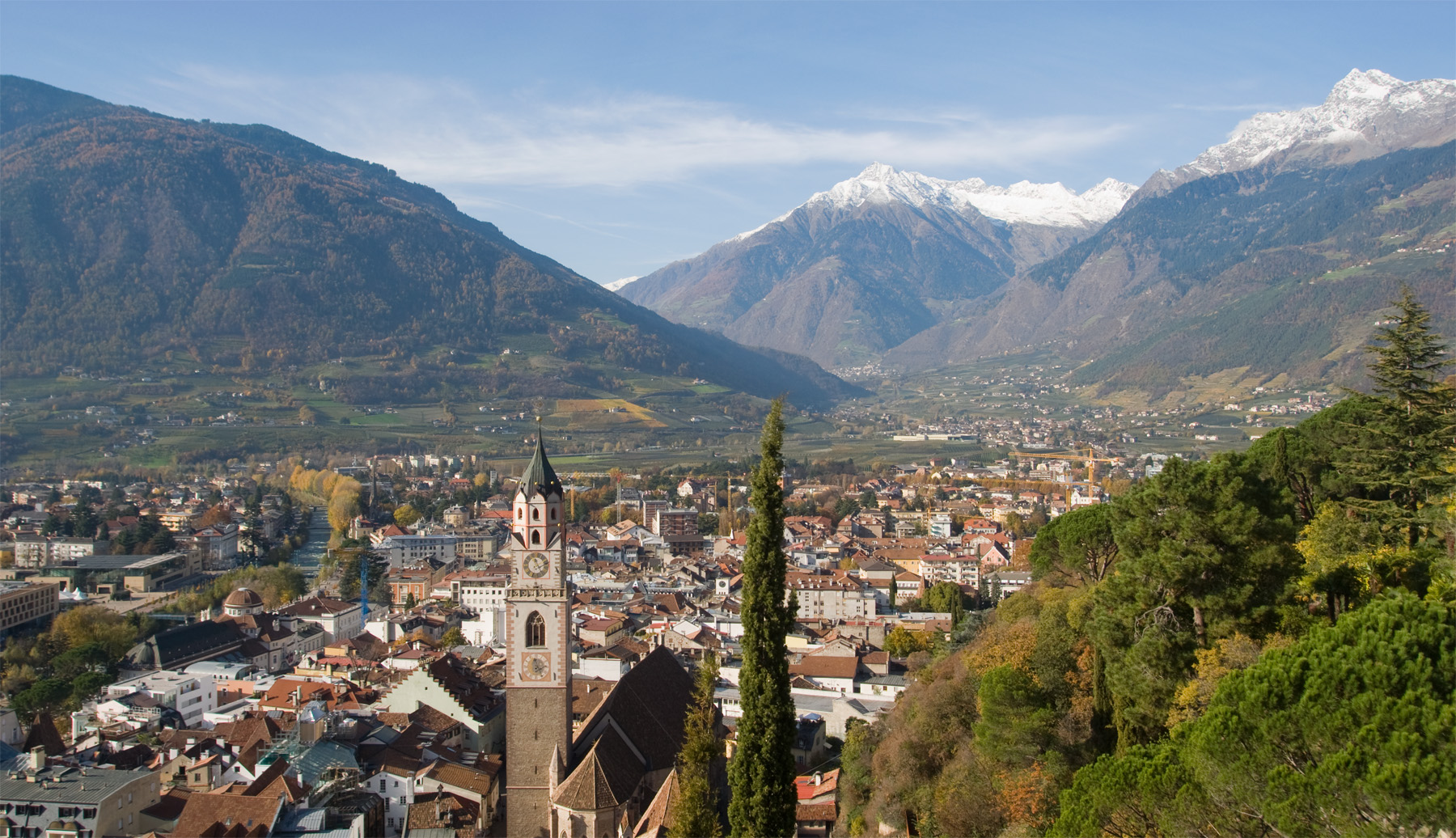
A video postcard introduced Citi Zēni's performance in the first semi-final of the Eurovision Song Contest 2022. The postcard was filmed in Merano in Trentino-South Tyrol and featured virtual projections of the band across the location.

According to Eurovision rules, all nations with the exceptions of the host country and the "Big Five" (France, Germany, Italy, Spain and the United Kingdom) are required to qualify from one of two semi-finals in order to compete for the final; the top ten countries from each semi-final progress to the final. The European Broadcasting Union (EBU) split up the competing countries into six different pots based on voting patterns from previous contests, with countries with favourable voting histories put into the same pot. On 25 January 2022, an allocation draw was held which placed each country into one of the two semi-finals, as well as which half of the show they would perform in. Latvia was placed into the first semi-final, which was held on 10 May 2022, and was scheduled to perform in the first half of the show.

Once all the competing songs for the 2022 contest had been released, the running order for the semi-finals was decided by the shows' producers rather than through another draw, so that similar songs were not placed next to each other. Latvia was set to perform in position 2 following the entry from Albania and after the entry from Lithuania.

The two semi-finals and the final were broadcast in Latvia on LTV1 with all shows featuring commentary by Toms Grēviņš and Lauris Reiniks. The Latvian spokesperson, who announced the top 12-point score awarded by the Latvian jury during the final, was Samanta Tīna.

=== Semi-final ===
Citi Zēni took part in technical rehearsals on 30 April and 4 May, followed by dress rehearsals on 9 and 10 May. This included the jury show on 9 May where the professional juries of each country watched and voted on the competing entries. The Latvian performance featured the members of Citi Zēni performing on stage wearing brightly coloured suits in a retro fashion to match the style of the song. The performance was fast paced and featured audience interaction and brightly coloured LED lights in the background. The performance was concluded with lead singer Jānis Pētersons performing a split. The performance also featured pyrotechnic effects.

At the end of the show, Latvia was not announced among the top 10 entries in the first semi-final and therefore failed to qualify to compete in the final. This was Latvia's fifth consecutive non-qualification to the grand final having last appeared in 2016. It was later revealed that Latvia placed fourteenth in the semi-final, receiving a total of 55 points: 16 points from the televoting and 39 points from the juries.

=== Voting ===
Voting during the three shows involved each country awarding two sets of points from 1-8, 10 and 12: one from their professional jury and the other from televoting. Each nation's jury consisted of five music industry professionals who are citizens of the country they represent. This jury judged each entry based on: vocal capacity; the stage performance; the song's composition and originality; and the overall impression by the act. In addition, each member of a national jury may only take part in the panel once every three years, and no jury was permitted to discuss of their vote with other members or be related in any way to any of the competing acts in such a way that they cannot vote impartially and independently. The individual rankings of each jury member in an anonymised form as well as the nation's televoting results were released shortly after the grand final.

Below is a breakdown of points awarded to Latvia and awarded by Latvia in the first semi-final and grand final of the contest, and the breakdown of the jury voting and televoting conducted during the two shows:

==== Points awarded to Latvia ====
Points awarded to Latvia (Semi-final 1)
Score	Televote	Jury
12 points		Portugal
10 points	Lithuania	
8 points		
7 points		
6 points		
5 points	Ukraine	
4 points		Greece; Iceland; Moldova
3 points		Bulgaria; Slovenia
2 points		Armenia; Lithuania; Switzerland
1 point	Netherlands	Austria; Denmark; Italy

==== Points awarded by Latvia ====
Points awarded by Latvia (Semi-final 1)
Score	Televote	Jury
12 points	Ukraine	Ukraine
10 points	Lithuania	Greece
8 points	Moldova	Iceland
7 points	Norway	Norway
6 points	Portugal	Denmark
5 points	Iceland	Portugal
4 points	Armenia	Switzerland
3 points	Netherlands	Netherlands
2 points	Denmark	Armenia
1 point	Austria	Lithuania

Points awarded by Latvia (Final)
Score	Televote	Jury
12 points	Ukraine	Ukraine
10 points	Lithuania	Sweden
8 points	Estonia	United Kingdom
7 points	Moldova	Greece
6 points	Sweden	Portugal
5 points	Norway	Norway
4 points	Spain	Netherlands
3 points	United Kingdom	Switzerland
2 points	Serbia	Australia
1 point	Finland	Lithuania

==== Detailed voting results ====
The following members comprised the Latvian jury:

- Anna Platpire – Commissioning editor
- Ģirts Lūsis – Musician
- Ikars Ruņģis – Musician
- Kaspars Ansons – Musician
- Laura Jēkabsone – Composer, Singer

Detailed voting results from Latvia (Semi-final 1)
R/O	Country	Jury							Televote	
R/O	Country	Juror 1	Juror 2	Juror 3	Juror 4	Juror 5	Rank	Points	Rank	Points
01	Albania	16	16	16	15	15	16		16	
02	Latvia									
03	Lithuania	13	10	5	4	7	10	1	2	10
04	Switzerland	2	9	7	7	8	7	4	11	
05	Slovenia	12	15	6	13	13	12		12	
06	Ukraine	9	1	1	1	6	1	12	1	12
07	Bulgaria	15	14	14	12	11	15		15	
08	Netherlands	8	8	4	11	3	8	3	8	3
09	Moldova	14	13	15	14	10	14		3	8
10	Portugal	6	7	9	2	9	6	5	5	6
11	Croatia	10	11	11	10	4	11		14	
12	Denmark	3	5	8	3	12	5	6	9	2
13	Austria	11	12	12	16	14	13		10	1
14	Iceland	1	6	13	8	2	3	8	6	5
15	Greece	5	4	2	5	1	2	10	13	
16	Norway	4	2	3	6	16	4	7	4	7
17	Armenia	7	3	10	9	5	9	2	7	4

Detailed voting results from Latvia (Final)
R/O	Country	Jury							Televote	
R/O	Country	Juror 1	Juror 2	Juror 3	Juror 4	Juror 5	Rank	Points	Rank	Points
01	Czech Republic	23	7	12	13	14	16		24	
02	Romania	24	25	22	24	25	25		20	
03	Portugal	8	3	5	11	5	5	6	11	
04	Finland	19	13	21	20	22	22		10	1
05	Switzerland	7	20	2	16	15	8	3	21	
06	France	12	23	23	25	16	20		14	
07	Norway	20	11	3	1	13	6	5	6	5
08	Armenia	9	14	10	19	6	13		16	
09	Italy	6	21	15	6	10	11		13	
10	Spain	17	2	13	21	23	12		7	4
11	Netherlands	4	8	14	8	9	7	4	12	
12	Ukraine	1	1	6	3	1	1	12	1	12
13	Germany	15	12	11	9	8	14		19	
14	Lithuania	10	10	19	4	12	10	1	2	10
15	Azerbaijan	22	9	18	17	7	17		22	
16	Belgium	21	24	16	10	19	19		23	
17	Greece	5	6	9	5	2	4	7	25	
18	Iceland	13	19	7	15	11	15		17	
19	Moldova	18	15	24	23	20	23		4	7
20	Sweden	2	4	8	2	4	2	10	5	6
21	Australia	14	5	4	14	21	9	2	18	
22	United Kingdom	3	17	1	7	3	3	8	8	3
23	Poland	16	18	20	18	17	21		15	
24	Serbia	25	22	25	22	24	24		9	2
25	Estonia	11	16	17	12	18	18		3	8
