= Supernova (Latvian TV series) =

Latvian music entertainment television show

- Genre: Music competition Reality television
- Presented by: Lauris Reiniks; Ketija Šēnberga; Māra Sleja; Toms Grēviņš; Beta Beidz; Justs Sirmais; Dagmāra Legante
- Judges: Kaspars Roga; Guntars Račs; Ieva Kerēvica; Dons; Intars Busulis; DJ Rudd; Ralfs Eilands; Linda Leen; Petri Mannonens; Artis Dvarionas
- Country of origin: Latvia
- Original language: Latvian
- No. of series: 11
- No. of episodes: 39

Production
- Production company: Latvijas Televīzija (LTV)

Original release
- Network: LTV1
- Release: 18 January 2015 – present

Supernova is a Latvian music entertainment show created by the Latvian broadcaster, Latvijas Televīzija (LTV). It is currently used as the Latvian national selection for the Eurovision Song Contest.

Supernova began airing in 2015, replacing the previous Latvian selection format Dziesma. Its first winner, Aminata Savadogo, went on to bring Latvia to the Eurovision Song Contest final for the first time since 2008, earning the country its best placing since 2005, and its fourth-best placing ever.

== Winners ==
Year	Artist	Song	Final	Points	Semi	Points
2015	Aminata	"Love Injected"	6	186	2	155
2016	Justs	"Heartbeat"	15	132	8	132
2017	Triana Park	"Line"	Did not qualify		18	21
2018	Laura Rizzotto	"Funny Girl"	Did not qualify		12	106
2019	Carousel	"That Night"	Did not qualify		15	50
2020	Samanta Tina	"Still Breathing"	Contest cancelled due to COVID-19 pandemic			
2022	Citi Zēni	"Eat Your Salad"	Did not qualify		14	55
2023	Sudden Lights	"Aijā"	Did not qualify		11	34
2024	Dons	"Hollow"	16	64	7	72
2025	Tautumeitas	"Bur man laimi"	13	158	2	130
2026	Atvara	"Ēnā"	Did not qualify		13	49
2027	TBD 6 February 2027 †					

== Editions ==
=== Editions overview ===
Color key

Male artist
Female artist
Band/duo

Year	Premiere	Final	Contestants	Episodes	Winner	Runner-up	Third place
2015	18 January 2015 (Note: Including two noncompetative introductory shows.)	22 February 2015	20	6	Aminata "Love Injected"	Markus Riva "Take Me Down"	ElektroFolk "Sundance"
2016	24 January 2016	28 February 2016	20	6	Justs "Heartbeat"	Catalepsia "Damnation"	MyRadiantU "We Will Be Stars"
2017	22 January 2017	26 February 2017	22	6	Triana Park "Line"	The Ludvig "I'm in Love with You"	My Radiant You "All I Know"
2018	25 January 2018	24 February 2018	21	6	Laura Rizzotto "Funny Girl"	Sudden Lights "Just Fine"	Madara "Esamība"
2019	26 January 2019	16 February 2019	16	3	Carousel "That Night"	Markus Riva "You Make Me So Crazy"	Laime Pilnīga "Awe"
2020	8 February 2020		9 (Note: Instead of a semi-final, 9 out of this edition's 26 shortlisted songs were internally selected by a jury to participate in the final.)	1	Samanta Tīna "Still Breathing"	Katrīna Dimanta "Heartbeats"	Annna "Polyester"
2022	5 February 2022	12 February 2022	17	2	Citi Zēni "Eat Your Salad"	Aminata "I'm Letting You Go"	Bujāns "He, She, You & Me"
2023	4 February 2023	11 February 2023	14	2	Sudden Lights "Aijā"	Patrisha "Hush"	24. Avēnija; "You Said"
2024	3 February 2024	10 February 2024	15	2	Dons "Hollow"	Vēstulēs "Kur?"	Katrīna Gupalo "The Cat's Song"
2025	1 February 2025	8 February 2025	19	2	Tautumeitas "Bur man laimi"	Emilija "Heartbeat"	Citi Zēni "Ramtai"
2026	31 January 2026	14 February 2026	24	3	Atvara "Ēnā"	Kautkaili "Te un tagad"	Emilija "All We Ever Had"

=== 2015 ===
Supernova 2015 consisted of two introduction shows, two heats, a semi-final, and a final. The introduction shows took place on 18 and 25 January 2015, the heats on 1 and 8 February 2015, the semi-final on 15 February 2015, and the final on 22 February 2015. The season started out with twenty competitors; however, only four made it to the final, where Aminata and her song "Love Injected" was declared the winner. A mix of jury voting and voting from the public decided the qualifiers of the heats and semi-finals; however, only voting from the public decided the winner of the final.

R/O	Artist	Song	Votes		Total	Place
R/O	Artist	Song	Internet	Televote	Total	Place
1	Aminata	"Love Injected"	8319	14017	22336	1
2	Mntha	"Nefelibata"	3010	7352	10362	4
3	ElektroFolk	"Sundance"	2803	7971	10774	3
4	Markus Riva	"Take Me Down"	5818	9932	15750	2

=== 2016 ===
Supernova 2016 consisted of two introduction shows, two heats, a semi-final, and a final. The introduction shows took place on 24 and 31 January 2016, the heats on 7 and 14 February 2016, the semi-final on 21 February 2016, and the final on 28 February 2016. The competing artists and their songs were revealed during the second introduction show. The season started out with twenty competitors; however, only four made it to the final, where Justs and his song "Heartbeat" was declared the winner. A mix of jury voting and voting from the public decided the qualifiers of the heats and semi-finals; however, only voting from the public decided the winner of the final.

R/O	Artist	Song	Votes		Total	Place
R/O	Artist	Song	Internet	Televote	Total	Place
1	Catalepsia	"Damnation"	5393	13521	18914	2
2	MyRadiantU	"We Will Be Stars"	2432	4219	6651	3
3	Justs	"Heartbeat"	8995	11730	20725	1
4	Marta Ritova	"Not From This World"	1869	3172	5041	4

=== 2017 ===
Supernova 2017 consisted of two introduction shows, two heats, a semi-final, and a final. The introduction shows took place on 22 and 29 January 2017, the heats on 5 and 12 February 2017, the semi-final on 19 February 2017, and the final on 26 February 2017. The competing artists and their songs were revealed on 13 January 2017. The season started out with twenty-two competitors; however, only four made it to the final, where Triana Park and their song "Line" were declared the winners. A mix of jury voting and voting from the public decided the qualifiers of the heats and semi-finals; however, only voting from the public decided the winner of the final.

R/O	Artist	Song	Public Vote				Place
R/O	Artist	Song	Online	Televote/SMS	Spotify streams	Total	Place
1	Santa Daņeļeviča	"Your Breath"	9.29%	13.71%	15.83%	12.94%	4
2	The Ludvig	"I'm in Love With You"	15.24%	12.76%	28.95%	18.98%	2
3	My Radiant You	"All I Know"	14.73%	15.66%	19.15%	16.52%	3
4	Triana Park	"Line"	60.74%	57.87%	36.07%	51.56%	1

=== 2018 ===
Supernova 2018 consisted of two introductory shows and four competition shows. Twenty-one artists competed in this season, which consisted of three semifinals and a final; the top two artists from each semifinal and the next-highest ranked artist from all three semifinals advanced to the final (for a total of seven artists). The first semifinal took place on 3 February, and the second and third semifinals took place on 10 February and 17 February, respectively. Technical voting errors were encountered during the second semifinal; this increased the number of artists in the final to eight. In the final, which was held on 24 February, Laura Rizzotto was declared the winner of the competition after her song "Funny Girl" scored the highest number of votes from the public.

R/O	Artist	Song	Televotes	Jury Votes	Internet votes	Spotify Streams	Total	Place
1	Sudden Lights	"Just Fine"	1563	2	2357	28%	4	2
2	Ritvars	"Who's Counting?"	488	4	490	11%	10	4
3	Madara	"Esamība"	1490	3	2785	18%	7	3
4	Liene Greifane	"Walk the Talk"	398	8	800	7%	13	7
5	Lauris Valters	"Lovers Bliss"	285	6	366	5%	14	8
6	Edgars Kreilis	"Younger Days"	413	5	781	9%	12	6
7	Laura Rizzotto	"Funny Girl"	2956	1	5172	12%	2	1
8	Markus Riva	"This Time"	2321	7	2839	10%	10	5

=== 2019 ===
Supernova 2019 consisted of three shows. Sixteen artists competed this season, which consisted of two semi-finals and a final; the top four artists from each semi-final advanced to the final (for a total of eight artists). The first semi-final took place on 26 January, while the second semi-final took place on 2 February. In the final, which was held on 16 February, Carousel and their song "That Night" were declared the winners following a mix of jury voting and votes from the Latvian public.

R/O	Artist	Song	Jury	Public					Total	Place
R/O	Artist	Song	Jury	Televotes	Internet	Spotify	Alfa	Total	Total	Place
1	Markus Riva	"You Make Me So Crazy"	5	23.86%	17.38%	24.48%	42.25%	1	6	2
2	Edgars Kreilis	"Cherry Absinthe"	4	3.68%	3.53%	6.30%	1.94%	7	11	6
3	Aivo Oskis	"Somebody's Got My Lover"	8	1.22%	0.85%	12.00%	1.94%	8	16	8
4	Double Faced Eels	"Fire"	3	5.44%	8.64%	39.46%	11.24%	4	7	4
5	Dziļi Violets feat. Kozmens	"Tautasdziesma"	7	13.46%	17.88%	4.59%	17.05%	3	10	5
6	Laime Pilnīga	"Awe"	2	18.33%	14.85%	4.80%	6.20%	5	7	3
7	Samanta Tīna	"Cutting the Wire"	6	8.73%	10.61%	3.80%	10.85%	6	12	7
8	Carousel	"That Night"	1	25.28%	26.26%	4.57%	8.53%	2	3	1

=== 2020 ===
Supernova 2020 consisted of a qualification round and a final. This was the first year, that semi-finals did not happen. 28 artists competed in the qualification round. 9 songs reached a final. In the final, which was held on 8 February, Samanta Tīna with her song "Still Breathing" was declared as the winning song, following a mix of jury and televote.

R/O	Artist	Song	Public Vote			Place
R/O	Artist	Song	Internet	Televote	Total	Place
1	Seleste	"Like Me"	2.43%	3.31%	2.82%	6
2	Driksna	"Stay"	1.04%	1.90%	1.42%	9
3	Katrīna Bindere	"I Will Break Your Heart"	1.22%	1.89%	1.52%	8
4	Edgars Kreilis	"Tridymite"	2.74%	2.11%	2.46%	7
5	Katrīna Dimanta	"Heart Beats"	22.63%	34.98%	28.12%	2
6	Miks Dukurs	"I'm Falling for You"	7.69%	6.93%	7.35%	4
7	Annna	"Polyester"	19.22%	13.84%	16.83%	3
8	Bad Habits	"Sail with You"	3.79%	4.40%	4.06%	5
9	Samanta Tīna	"Still Breathing"	39.24%	30.63%	35.42%	1

Following the cancellation of the Eurovision Song Contest 2020 due to the COVID-19 pandemic, Samanta Tīna was internally re-selected to represent Latvia in the Eurovision Song Contest 2021, with a new song, "The Moon Is Rising".

=== 2022 ===
Supernova 2022 consisted of a semi-final and a final. In the semi-final, which took place on 5 February, seventeen acts competed and the top ten entries qualified to the final based on the combination of votes from a jury panel and the Latvian public. On 10 February 2022, LTV announced that the song "First Love" performed by Miks Dukurs had been awarded a wildcard to qualify to the final due to technical issues that impacted his semi-final performance. In the final, which was held on 12 February, Citi Zēni were declared the winners following a mix of jury voting and votes from the Latvian public.

R/O	Artist	Song	Jury	Televote		Total	Place
R/O	Artist	Song	Jury	Votes	Points	Total	Place
1	Miks Dukurs	"First Love"	0	2,116	0	0	11
2	Raum	"Plans"	5	3,486	2	7	9
3	Linda Rušeniece	"Pay My Own Bills"	6	3,394	1	7	10
4	Bermudu Divstūris	"Bad"	2	24,216	6	8	7
5	Miks Galvanovskis	"I'm Just a Sinner"	7	16,060	5	12	4
6	Bujāns	"He, She, You & Me"	3	38,924	10	13	3
7	Elīna Gluzunova	"Es pabiju tur"	8	3,572	3	11	5
8	Citi Zēni	"Eat Your Salad"	12	50,566	12	24	1
9	Inspo	"A Happy Place"	4	6,432	4	8	8
10	Mēs Jūs Mīlam	"Rich Itch"	1	26,692	7	8	6
11	Aminata	"I'm Letting You Go"	10	30,983	8	18	2

=== 2023 ===
The semi-final took place on 4 February 2023. In the semi-final, 14 acts competed and the top ten entries qualified to the final based on the combination of votes from a jury panel and the Latvian public. Sudden Lights won both the jury and public votes in the final held on 11 February.

R/O	Artist	Song	Jury	Televote		Total	Place
R/O	Artist	Song	Jury	Votes	Points	Total	Place
1	Alise Haijima	"Tricky"	3	5,607	3	6	8
2	Luīze	"You to Hold Me"	2	2,384	1	3	10
3	Raum	"Fake Love"	4	6,986	5	9	6
4	Toms Kalderauskis	"When It All Falls"	7	2,608	2	9	7
5	Artūrs Hatti	"Love Vibes"	1	6,251	4	5	9
6	Patrisha	"Hush"	10	50,958	10	20	2
7	Sudden Lights	"Aijā"	12	66,307	12	24	1
8	24. Avēnija	"You Said"	8	8,735	7	15	3
9	Avéi	"Let Me Go"	5	8,294	6	11	5
10	Markus Riva	"Forever"	6	27,302	8	14	4

=== 2024 ===
The semi-final took place on 3 February 2024. 15 acts competed and the top ten entries qualified to the final based on the combination of votes from a jury panel and the Latvian public. The final took place on 10 February 2024 among the ten entries that advanced from the semi-final. The song with the highest number of votes based on the combination of votes from a jury panel and the Latvian public, "Hollow" by Dons, was declared the winner.

R/O	Artist	Song	Jury	Televote		Total	Place
R/O	Artist	Song	Jury	Votes	Points	Total	Place
1	Vēstulēs	"Kur?"	10	31,477	10	20	2
2	Avéi	"Mine"	4	2,946	3	7	8
3	Papīra Lidmašīnas	"Mind Breaker"	1	2,018	2	3	10
4	Katrīna Gupalo	"The Cat's Song"	8	17,739	8	16	3
5	Ecto	"Outsider"	2	4,915	5	7	7
6	Dons	"Hollow"	12	64,845	12	24	1
7	Saint Levića	"Tick-Tock"	6	3,487	4	10	5
8	Edvards Strazdiņš	"Rock n' Roll Supernova"	3	7,830	6	9	6
9	Funkinbiz	"Na chystu vodu" (На чисту воду)	5	1,143	1	6	9
10	Alekss Silvers	"For the Show"	7	8,285	7	14	4

=== 2025 ===
The semi-final took place on 1 February 2025. 19 acts competed and the top ten entries qualified to the final based on the combination of votes from a jury panel and the Latvian public. The final took place on 8 February 2025 among the ten entries that advanced from the semi-final. After combining the number of votes based on the combination of votes from a jury panel and the Latvian public, Citi Zēni, Emilija, and Tautumeitas were tied with eighteen points each, but the latter received the most public votes of the three entries, so the song "Bur man laimi" by Tautumeitas was declared the winner. This is the first time since Supernova returned and adopted its current voting format in 2022 where the public and the jury did not agree on a winner; Citi Zēni—who won Supernova 2022—won the jury vote, while The Ludvig won the public vote.

R/O	Artist	Song	Jury	Televote		Total	Place
R/O	Artist	Song	Jury	Votes	Points	Total	Place
1	Chris Noah	"Romance Isn't Dead"	7	27,808	7	14	5
2	Palú	"Delusional"	4	6,309	3	7	7
3	Sinerģija	"Bound by the Light"	3	6,184	2	5	9
4	Citi Zēni	"Ramtai"	12	22,562	6	18	3
5	Tepat	"Sadzejot"	2	4,848	1	3	10
6	The Ludvig	"Līgo"	5	69,933	12	17	4
7	Markus Riva	"Bigger than This"	1	18,927	5	6	8
8	Tautumeitas	"Bur man laimi"	8	61,028	10	18	1
9	Bel Tempo and Legzdina	"The Water"	6	15,047	4	10	6
10	Emilija	"Heartbeat"	10	56,577	8	18	2

=== 2026 ===
The semi-finals took place on 31 January and 7 February 2026, respectively. Twelve acts competed in each semi-final, with the top five entries from each qualifying to the final based on the combination of votes from a jury panel and the Latvian public. The final took place on 14 February 2026 among the ten entries that advanced from the semi-finals. Atvara was declared the winner after receiving the most points from both jury voting and votes from the Latvian public.

R/O	Artist	Song	Jury	Televote		Total	Place
R/O	Artist	Song	Jury	Votes	Points	Total	Place
1	De Mantra	"Let Them"	1	3.35%	5	6	8
2	Elpo	"Blakus"	5	2.32%	3	8	7
3	Krisy	"Take It"	3	1.86%	1	4	10
4	Kautkaili	"Te un tagad"	10	26.84%	10	20	2
5	Legzdina	"Ribbon"	2	2.12%	2	4	9
6	Emilija	"All We Ever Had"	8	14.93%	8	16	3
7	Atvara	"Ēnā"	12	27.67%	12	24	1
8	Robert Ox	"Ravin' at the Taj Mahal"	7	9.42%	7	14	4
9	Tikasha Sakama	"#010126 Coda"	6	2.84%	4	10	6
10	Miks Galvanovskis	"Cruel Angel"	4	8.65%	6	10	5
