= Suņi Iziet Ielās =

2021 album by Citi Zēni

Studio album by Citi Zēni
- Released: October 28, 2021
- Length: 43:15
- Language: Latvian
- Label: TCLV Records

Suņi Iziet Ielās (transl. Dogs Take To The Streets) is the debut studio album by Latvian pop band Citi Zēni. It was released on October 28, 2021, through TCLV Records.

== Background ==
Suņi Iziet Ielās is Citi Zēni's first studio release, followed by the release of three singles. While the album was supposed to be released in the summer of 2021, it was delayed to the fall. In an interview, lead singer Jānis Pētersons wrote that "We have decided to postpone the release of the album until the world gets back on track. There is nowhere to hurry, because it is best to enjoy music in peace." The album was eventually released on October 28, 2021.

== Music and lyrics ==
Citi Zēni has stated in interviews that the album was meant to bring joy in dark times, and to bring a sense of irony on current events. The band's drummer, Toms Kagainis, said that "We have to stop waiting for someone else to create something positive, instead we want to give everyone a chance to get lost in our music and forget about everything else."

== Reception ==
The album was considered a commercial success in Citi Zēni's home country of Latvia. A review from Latvian newspaper Neatkarīgā Rīta Avīze praised the album's takes on current events and the jokes on Latvian society. However, it also criticized the album for falling into the mainstream pop music industry, with no uniqueness to set it apart.

== Track listings ==
Suņi Iziet Ielās track listing
No.	Title	Length
1.	"Limuzīns Uz Krīta"	3:08
2.	"Kā Man Gribētos"	3:18
3.	"Kā Tevi Sauc"	3:03
4.	"Saules Stari"	3:08
5.	"Kolkas Raga Smaile"	3:22
6.	"Lai Dzīvo Tas"	3:17
7.	"Skaistās Kājas"	4:04
8.	"Ar Spārniņiem"	2:34
9.	"No Darba Uz Darbu"	2:53
10.	"Vienmēr Kavēju"	2:59
11.	"Kam Tas Ir Izdevīgi"	2:37
12.	"Suņi Iziet Ielās"	2:54
13.	"Parādi Kas Tas Ir"	2:52
14.	"Zelta Žakete"	3:16
Total length:		43:15
