= Emilija (singer) =

Latvian singer and songwriter

- Born: Emilija Bērziņa; 19 September 2002 (age 24); Latvia
- Occupations: Singer; songwriter

Emilija Bērziņa (born 19 September 2002) is a Latvian singer and songwriter. She won the fifth season of X Faktors and has competed in Supernova twice.

== Early life and education ==
Emilija Bērziņa was born on 19 September 2002. She and her sister were placed in an orphanage after their birth parents lost custody due to being imprisoned as a result of substance abuse. Bērziņa was adopted by parents who had two daughters. Seven years later, her adopted parents also divorced and Bērziņa was sent into boarding school up to the ninth grade, where she spent several weekends with her adoptive paternal grandmother and found out of her adoption. She attended Smiltene Technical School where she studied cooking. When she was 18, her adoptive parents canceled the adoption. Bērziņa reconnected with her birth mother and briefly met her birth father but was unable to find information regarding her older sister, who was adopted by a French family. She, however, has maintained contact with her adoptive father and grandmother.

== Career ==
In 2023, Bērziņa competed in the fifth season of X Faktors, which she won in December.

On 20 November 2024, it was announced that Emilija was selected as a semi-finalist in Supernova 2025 with the song "Heartbeat". The show was used to determine Latvia's representative for the Eurovision Song Contest 2025. The song reached the final, the combination of votes from a jury panel and the Latvian public resulted in a tie for first place between "Bur man laimi" and "Heartbeat", but since "Bur man laimi" performed by Tautumeitas received the most votes from the latter, it was declared the winner.

On 23 April 2025, Emilija released her debut studio album, entitled Par Tiem, Kas Man Pagāja Garām. On 19 September 2025, she released her first EP entitled Tintes stāsts. On 20 November 2025, Emilija was confirmed among the artists participating in the 11th edition of Supernova, the Latvian selection for the Eurovision Song Contest 2026, with the song "All We Ever Had". After advancing to the first semi-final, she finished in third place on 14 February 2026.

== Discography ==
=== Studio albums ===
Title	Details
Par tiem, kas man pagāja garām	Released: 23 April 2025; Label: Emilija; Formats: Digital download, streaming

=== Extended plays ===
Title	Details
Tintes stāsts	Released: 19 September 2025; Label: 8whales Records; Formats: Digital download, streaming
