= Markus Riva =

Latvian singer (born 1986)

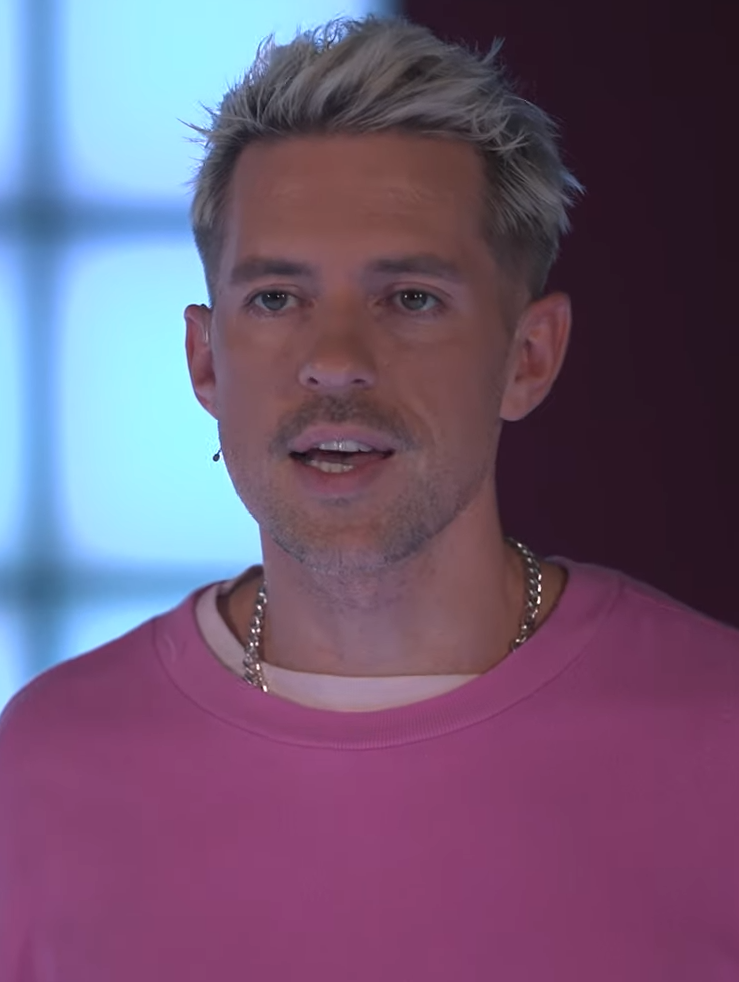
- Riva in January 2025

Background information
- Born: Miķelis Ļaksa; 2 October 1986 (age 40); Talsi, Latvia
- Genre: Pop
- Occupation: Singer
- Instrument: Vocals
- Years active: 2009–present
- Website: www.markus-riva.com

Miķelis Ļaksa (born 2 October 1986), known professionally as Markus Riva, is a Latvian singer. He has released several albums, including the debut album Ticu (2009).

Riva worked at Capital FM as a DJ, and has composed music for various television shows. Among creative inspirations, he mentions artists such as Beyoncé, Robyn and Woody Allen. In 2025, he won the TV show “Koru kari” with lv:Talsu baltais koris.

== Career ==
=== 2014–2023: Dziesma, Supernova and X Faktors ===
He has competed repeatedly in Latvia's national selection for the Eurovision Song Contest. He has entered the Latvian national selection for the past eight editions in a row. His first national selection entry was in 2014, when he entered the national selection Dziesma 2014 with the song "Lights On", with which he qualified to the final, where he placed 11th and therefore didn't qualify to the superfinal of the competition. In 2015, Riva released his first single in Russian titled "Taty", the video for the single was made by director Alan Badoev. In 2015 he again entered the selection, now called Supernova with a new format. He returned with his song "Take Me Down", the English version of "Taty", which went on to place second in the final, behind the eventual winner Aminata's song "Love Injected". In 2016, Riva entered with his song "I Can", and came third in the semi-final, however since he was in neither the top two in the jury voting or the televote, he did not reach the final.

An exponent of the Ape Music, since 2017 Riva has been hosting X Faktors, the Latvian version of The X Factor. The same year, Riva again participated in Supernova, this time with the song "Dynamite". He failed to qualify from the second heat, finishing in sixth place. In 2018, Riva entered again with the song "This Time". Originally, he was said to have failed to qualify from his semi-final, however due to technical errors in the voting he would have qualified over Ritvars' song "Who's Counting", so both songs were sent through to the final. In the final, Riva placed fifth out of eight entries. In 2019, he participated in Supernova with his song "You Make Me So Crazy". Having qualified from the semi-final, he placed second out of 8 entries, behind the eventual winner Carousel's song "That Night". In 2020, he returned for a seventh consecutive year with the song "Impossible", co-written by Aminata. He was not selected to participate following an audition round. He returned to Supernova in 2022 with the song "If You're Gonna Love Me", but didn't qualify to the final. In 2023, he was selected once again to perform the song "Forever", which qualified to the final and placed fourth.

==== Participations in Latvia's Eurovision National Final ====
Table key
1	Winner
2	Second place
3	Third place
X	Entry selected but did not compete
†	Upcoming

Contest	Song	Final	Points	Semi	Points
Dziesma 2014	"Lights On"	11th	20	5th	18
Supernova 2015	"Take Me Down"	2nd	15750	Jury qualifier	
Supernova 2016	"I Can"	Not qualified		3rd	2909
Supernova 2017	"Dynamite"	Eliminated at Heat stage			
Supernova 2018	"This Time"	5th	10	2nd	4
Supernova 2019	"You Make Me So Crazy"	2nd	6	3rd	6
Supernova 2020	"Impossible"	Eliminated at Live audition round			
Supernova 2022	"If You're Gonna Love Me"	Not qualified		Not revealed	
Supernova 2023	"Forever"	4th	14	Not revealed	
Supernova 2024	"Lose Control"	Preliminary elimination			
Supernova 2025	"Bigger than This"	8th	6	Not revealed	
Supernova 2027	"Rēgs"				

== Discography ==
=== Studio albums ===
List of albums, with selected details
Title	Details
Ticu	Released: 2009; Label: Deeselecta (DEES006); Format: CD, digital
Songs from NYC	Released: December 2010; Label: Markus Riva; Format: CD, digital
How It Feels	Released: November 2013; Label: Promark Music; Format: CD, digital
MR	Released: October 2015; Label: Markus Riva; Format: CD, digital
I Can	Released: September 2018; Label: Markus Riva; Format: CD, digital
Laika Upe	Released: December 2019; Label: Markus Riva; Format: CD, digital
Pazudīšu Pilsētā	Released: December 2021; Label: Markus Riva; Format: CD, digital
Bigger Than This	Released: November 2024; Label: Markus Riva (MR2024); Format: CD, digital

==== Charted Singles ====
List of charted singles as lead artist, showing album name and year released
Title	Year	Peak chart positions			Album
Title	Year	LAT Air.	CIS Air.	UKR Air.	Album
"Ne vidpuskay" (with Myata)	2018	*	191	7	Tam, de ray
"Svadhisthana"	2018	*	—	21	Non-album singles
"One Night" (with Myszkovski)	2023	6	—	—	Non-album singles
"Too Late for Love" (with Myszkovski)	2024	9	—	—	Non-album singles
"Far from Me"	2024	21	—	—	Bigger Than This
"—" denotes items which were not released in that country or failed to chart. "*" denotes the chart did not exist at that time.
