= Hollow (Dons song) =

2023 song by Dons

Single by Dons

from the album Laiks
- Released: 11 September 2023
- Length: 2:52
- Label: Universal
- Songwriters: Artūrs Šingirejs; Kate Northrop; Liam Geddes
- Producer: Liam Geddes

Dons singles chronology
"Divatā" (2023)	"Hollow" (2023)	"Dark" (2024)

Music video
- "Lauzto šķēpu karaļvalsts" on YouTube "Hollow" on YouTube

Eurovision Song Contest 2024 entry
- Country: Latvia
- Artist: Dons
- Language: English
- Composers: Artūrs Šingirejs; Kate Northrop; Liam Geddes
- Lyricists: Artūrs Šingirejs; Kate Northrop; Liam Geddes

Finals performance
- Semi-final result: 7th
- Semi-final points: 72
- Final result: 16th
- Final points: 64

Entry chronology
- ◄ "Aijā" (2023)
- "Bur man laimi" (2025) ►

Official performance video
- "Hollow" (Second Semi-Final) on YouTube "Hollow" (Grand Final) on YouTube

"Hollow" is a song by Latvian singer-songwriter Dons. Originally released in Latvian under the title "Lauzto šķēpu karaļvalsts" on 11 September 2023, its English version was released on 2 January 2024 by Universal. The song was written by Dons, Kate Northrop, and Liam Geddes, and represented Latvia in the Eurovision Song Contest 2024, where it placed 16th with 64 points. In the process, the song became the first Latvian entry to qualify for the grand final since 2016.

On 16 October, 2024, the Latvian Music Producers Association presented Dons with a platinum certificate for "Hollow"; the platinum award is given to songs that have been streamed 4 million times or more.

== Background and composition ==
"Hollow" was written and composed by Dons, Kate Northrop, and Liam Geddes during a songwriting camp in Spain. It was first released in Latvian as "Lauzto šķēpu karaļvalsts" on 11 September 2023. In interviews with Wiwibloggs' William Lee Adams, Dons says that the song explores how one's "insecurities can hold us hostage", with others trying to dictate on how a person should live. Dons compares the culmination of pressures as "a big ball of weight" on someone, with the only situation on removing said weight is finding hope. He later stated that without any hope, "we’re doomed... I couldn’t sing a song without hope because it would be too depressing for me." He further went on to say that the song was a representation of himself.

The song was released on 2 January 2024, with the song being speculated to enter Supernova 2024, the Latvian national final for the Eurovision Song Contest 2024. The song was officially announced as an entrant seven days later.

== Music video and promotion ==
Along with the song's release, an accompanying music video was released on the same day. To further promote the song, Dons opened sales for merchandise that featured the song's branding in March 2024. He also announced his intent to participate in various Eurovision pre-parties throughout the months of March and April 2024, including Pre-Party ES 2024 on 30 March, the Barcelona Eurovision Party 2024 on 6 April, the London Eurovision Party 2024 on 7 April, Eurovision in Concert 2024 on 13 April, and the Nordic Eurovision Party 2024 on 14 April.

== Critical reception ==
"Hollow" has drawn mixed reception from music critics and beat reporters. In a Wiwibloggs review containing several reviews from several critics, the song was rated 5.77 out of 10 points, earning 28th out of the 37 songs competing in the Eurovision Song Contest 2024 on the site's annual ranking. Another review conducted by ESC Bubble that contained reviews from a combination of readers and juries rated the song fifth out of the 16 songs "Hollow" was competing against in its the Eurovision semi-final. ESC Beat's Doron Lahav ranked the song fifth overall out of 37 songs, praising the lyrics and the song's message. In contrast, Jon O'Brien, a writer for Vulture, ranked the song last out of the 37 songs, stating that the song lacked "anything remotely distinctive" and was for "those who find Imagine Dragons a little too edgy". Scotsman writer Erin Adam wrote a neutral review, rating the song six points out of 10 and stating that it was an "unshowy, but a good, honest pop ballad".

== Eurovision Song Contest ==
=== Supernova 2024 ===
Latvia's broadcaster Latvijas Televīzija (LTV) organized a 15-entry competition, Supernova 2024, to select its entrant for the Eurovision Song Contest 2024. The contest was the ninth edition of the national final. The contest was split into two rounds: all 15 songs competed in the semi-final where the top 10 songs advanced into a grand final. In the final, the winner was selected by a 50/50 vote of juries and televoting.

The song was officially announced as an entrant for the competition on 9 January 2024. It was drawn to perform 11th in the semi-final on 3 February, where it qualified to the grand final. At the end of the final on 10 February, the song was announced to have won both the televote and the jury vote, winning the competition. As a result of winning the competition, the song won rights to represent Latvia in the Eurovision Song Contest 2024.

=== At Eurovision ===
The Eurovision Song Contest 2024 took place at the Malmö Arena in Malmö, Sweden, and consisted of two semi-finals held on the respective dates of 7 and 9 May and the final on 11 May 2024. During the allocation draw on 30 January 2024, Latvia was drawn to compete in the second semi-final, performing in the second half of the show. Dons was later drawn to perform ninth in the semi-final, ahead of Armenia's Ladaniva and before San Marino's Megara.

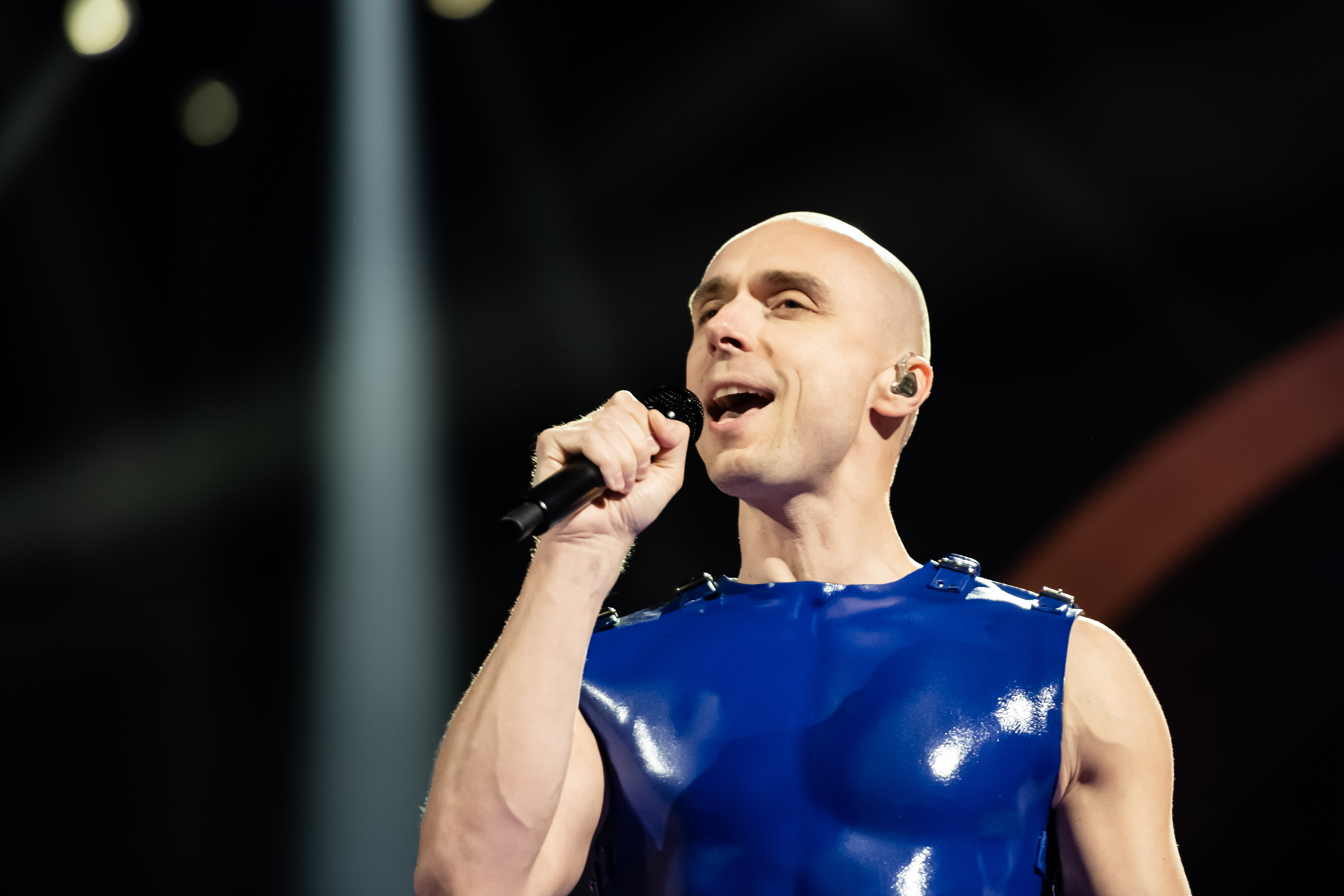
Dons performing "Hollow" in a dress rehearsal before the second semi-final of the Eurovision Song Contest 2024.

For its Eurovision performance, Dons wore a blue, sleeveless pantsuit, with a large circular prop accompanying the stage with him. Throughout the performance, the lighting changes colours; the verses are performed under blue lighting, the chorus is performed under white, and occasional purple lighting is shown in the performance. Despite bookmakers having Latvia lowest in the odds to qualify, "Hollow" finished in seventh, scoring 72 points and securing a position in the grand final. The qualification was the first for Latvia since 2016.

Dons repeated his performance during the grand final on 11 May. The song was performed in 11th, ahead of Ireland's Bambie Thug and before Greece's Marina Satti. After the results were announced, Dons finished 16th with a total of 64 points, with a split result of 36 points from juries and 28 points from public televoting. No country awarded the maximum set of 12 points toward the song in either category. Regarding the former, the most allocated by a single country was eight, with it coming from Georgia and Luxembourg. The most a country gave in the latter category was five, given by Ireland and Ukraine.

== Track listing ==
Original version

1. "Lauzto šķēpu karaļvalsts" – 2:51

English version

1. "Hollow" – 2:51

Sped-up EP

1. "Hollow" (sped up) – 2:02
2. "Hollow" – 2:51
3. "Hollow" (instrumental) – 2:51
4. "Lauzto šķēpu karaļvalsts" – 2:45

Acoustic version

1. "Hollow" (acoustic) (with Mārcis Auziņš) – 2:51

== Charts ==
Chart performance for "Hollow"
Chart (2024)	Peak position
Latvia Airplay (LaIPA)	20
Latvia Domestic Airplay (LaIPA)	3
Latvia Streaming (LaIPA)	5
Latvia Domestic Streaming (LaIPA)	1
Lithuania (AGATA)	48

== Certifications ==
Certifications for "Lauzto šķēpu karaļvalsts" (streaming)
Region	Certification	Certified units/sales
Latvia (LaIPA)	Gold	2,000,000

Certifications for "Hollow" (streaming)
Region	Certification	Certified units/sales
Latvia (LaIPA)	2× Platinum	8,000,000

== Release history ==
Release history and formats for "Hollow"
Country	Date	Format(s)	Version	Label	Ref.
Various	11 September 2023	Digital download; streaming	Latvian	Universal Music Oy	
Various	2 January 2024	Digital download; streaming	English	Universal Music Oy	
Various	28 March 2024	Digital download; streaming	Sped-up; Instrumental	Universal Music Oy	
Various	30 April 2024	Digital download; streaming	Acoustic	Universal Music Oy	
