= Patrisha =

Latvian singer and songwriter

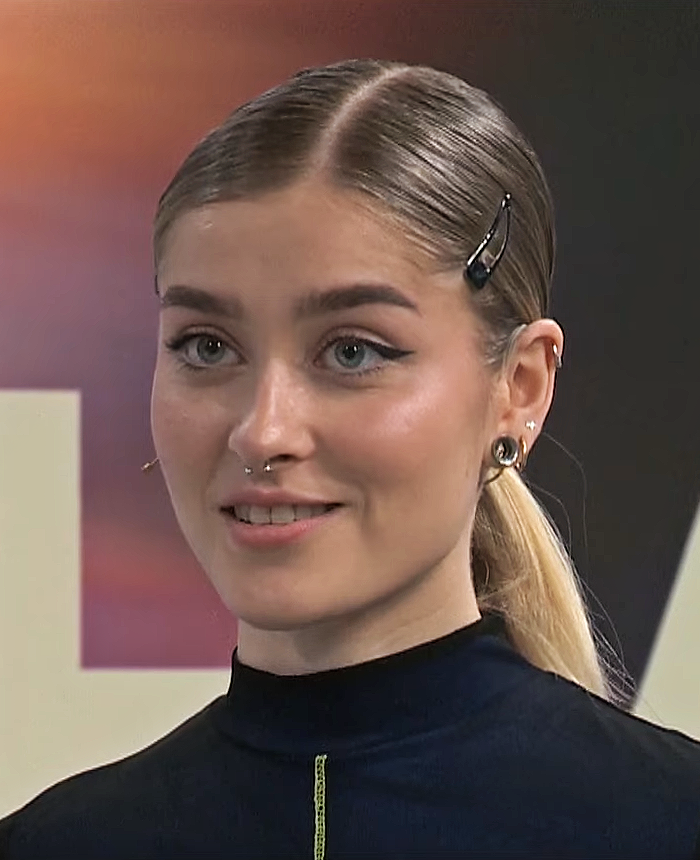
- Patrisha in 2023

Background information
- Born: Patrīcija Ksenija Cuprijanoviča; 25 June 2001 (age 25); Riga, Latvia
- Origin: Ādaži, Latvia
- Genre: Pop
- Instrument: Vocals
- Years active: 2017–present
- Label: Universal Music Oy

Patrīcija Ksenija Cuprijanoviča (born 25 June 2001), better known as Patrisha, is a Latvian singer, songwriter and radio personality.

== Life ==
Patricija was born in Riga. Her family is of Belarusian, Russian and Ukrainian descent. She lived with her family in Vecmīlgrāvis until she was 13 years old, then the family moved to Kalngale. She returned to Riga at the age of 18.

She has been singing since childhood. The singer's talent was especially noticed at school, singing in the choir. She attended the creative children's and youth studio "Star Island" and since the age of 11 has participated in more than 60 singing competitions, both in Latvia ("April drops" and "Voice Commander") and abroad (Poland, Ukraine, Malta and elsewhere). She first gained recognition in the Ukrainian competition "Moloda Halychyna", where she won second place at the age of 15. She also participated in the Latvian selection of the Russian television show "Golos" ("Voice").

At the age of 16, Patricija gained her first wider recognition in Latvia by participating in the Latvian version of the show X Faktors in 2017. At the beginning of 2019, she became the first musician from Latvia to sign a contract with Universal Music Group, under whose auspices she released three singles: “Es varu būt tā”, “Visu un vēl vairāk” and “Lai tev sāp”. By then, she was considered one of the most successful young musicians in Latvia. At the end of the year, on November 27, her debut EP with six songs, Patrisha bija šeit, was released. In 2020, she won the Golden Microphone Award in the "Best Debut" category, while the album was nominated in the "Pop Music Album" category.

Since May 21, 2020, she has hosted the Radio EHR program "Latvian Music Stage".

In January 2023 it was announced Patrisha would perform at Supernova with the song "Hush" and compete to represent Latvia at the Eurovision Song Contest in Liverpool. On February 4 she made it through the semifinal to enter the top ten. Patrisha finished in second place behind Sudden Lights with 20 points.

== Discography ==
=== Studio albums ===
Title	Album details
Periodi	Release date: 6 November 2025; Publisher: Self-published; Format: Digital download, streaming

=== Extended plays ===
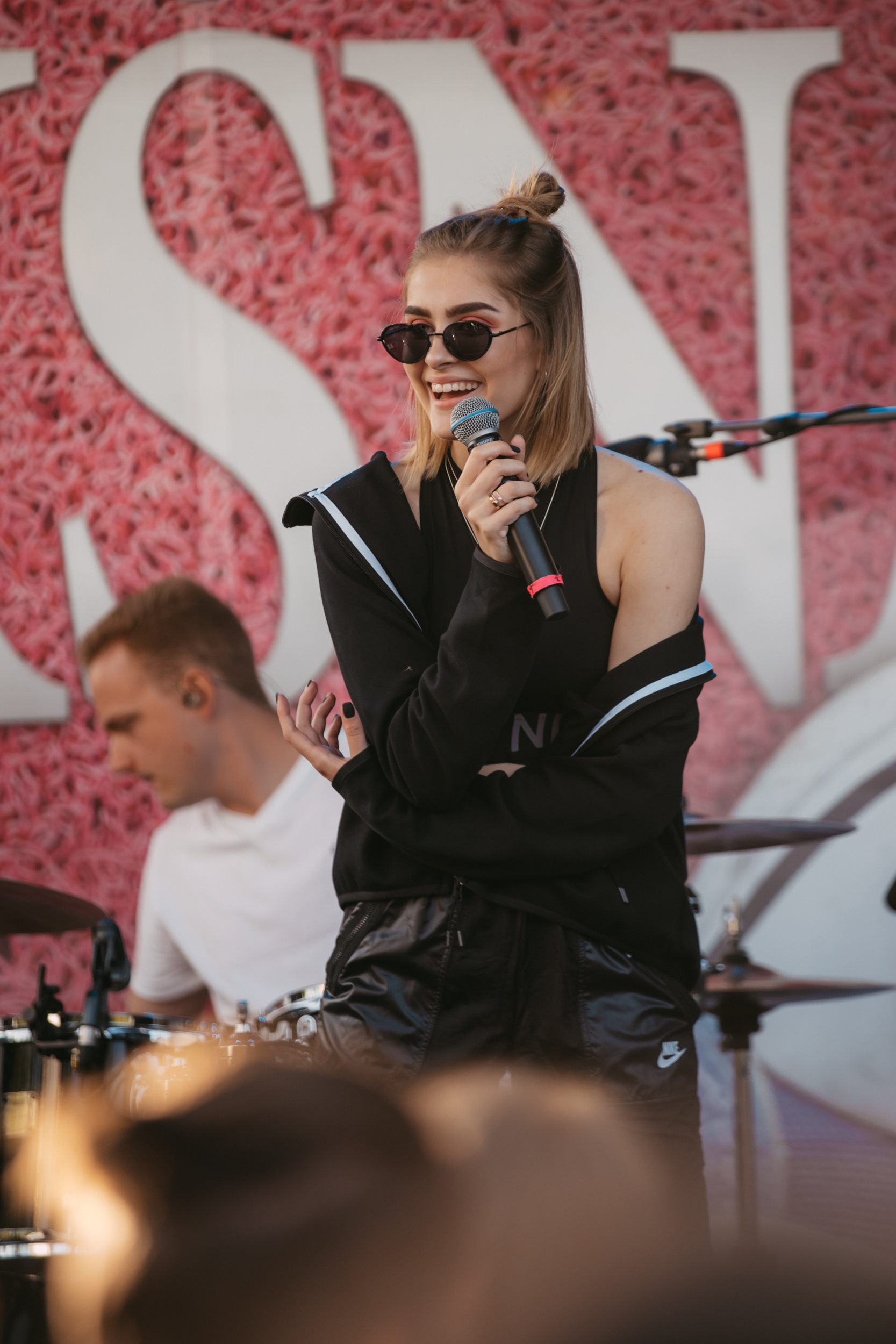
Patrisha performing in 2019

List of EPs, with selected details
Title	Information
Patrisha bija šeit	Released: 27 November 2019; Publisher: Universal Music Oy; Format: Digital download, streaming

=== Singles ===
==== As lead artist ====
List of singles, with year, album and chart positions
Title	Year	Peak chart positions				Certifications	Album or EP
Title	Year	LAT Air. (Note: Both Latvian Music Producers Association and TopHit provides airplay charts for Latvia. Since 2023 LaIPA airplay chart has only 20 positions, for this reason the peaks below Top 20 are taken from TopHit Latvian airplay chart.)	LAT Dom. Air.	LAT Stream.	LAT Dom. Stream.	Certifications	Album or EP
"Es varu būt tā"	2019	91	*		7		Patrisha bija šeit
"Visu un vēl vairāk"	2019	—	*		—		Patrisha bija šeit
"Lai tev sāp"	2019	77	*		—		Patrisha bija šeit
"Daudz par daudz"	2020	85	*		*		Non-album singles
"Vējš sniegu nes"	2020	—	*		*		Non-album singles
"Jūtas nolietotas"	2021	—	*		*		Non-album singles
"Pāries" (with Dināra Rudāne and Ūga)	2021	—	*		*		Non-album singles
"Es varēju būt tā"	2022	—	*		*		Non-album singles
"Hush"	2023	—	—	—	13		Non-album singles
"Raķešu Zinātne" (with Fiņķis)	2023	—	4	1	1	LaIPA: Platinum	Non-album singles
"Tikai savā iztēlē"	2023	—	3	—	—		Non-album singles
"Pilsēta no lauskām"	2024	—	6	—	—		Non-album singles
"Love Bites"	2024	—	—	—	—		Non-album singles
"Dzeltenie aizkari"	2025	—	—	—	—		Non-album singles
"Atnāc rīt"	2025	—	—	—	—		Periodi
"Gribu" (featuring I Mean Love)	2025	7	1	—	—		Periodi
"Zemūdene"	2025	70	—	—	—		Non-album singles
"Paliec mazliet"	2026	—	—	—	—		Non-album singles
"—" denotes a recording that did not chart or was not released in that territory. "*" denotes that the chart did not exist at that time.

==== As featured artist ====
Singles	Year	Album or EP
"Mēs Esam" (Fakts and Reiks, featuring Patrisha)	2018	Reiks ir Visur
"Nepārmet man 3000" (Gustavo and Normunds Rutulis, featuring Patrisha)	2024	Non-album single

=== Other charted songs ===
==== As lead artist ====
List of other charted songs, with selected chart positions
Title	Year	Peak chart positions	Album or EP
Title	Year	LAT Air.	Album or EP
"Patrisha bija šeit" (featuring Su Takeøut and Rolands če)	2019	78	Patrisha bija šeit

==== As featured artist ====
Title	Year	Peak chart positions	Album or EP
Title	Year	LAT Air.	Album or EP
"Prom" (Remix) (Marta, featuring Patrisha)	2021	37	Lietas, kas joprojām notiek manā galvā
