= Aijā =

2023 single by Sudden Lights

Single by Sudden Lights
- Language: English, Latvian
- Released: 27 January 2023
- Length: 3:00
- Label: Self-released
- Songwriters: Andrejs Reinis Zitmanis; Kārlis Matīss Zitmanis; Kārlis Vārtiņš; Mārtiņš Matīss Zemītis

Sudden Lights singles chronology
| "Jasmīns" (2022) | "Aijā" (2023) |

Music video
- "Aijā" on YouTube

Eurovision Song Contest 2023 entry
- Country: Latvia
- Artist: Sudden Lights
- Languages: English; Latvian
- Composers: Andrejs Reinis Zitmanis; Kārlis Matīss Zitmanis; Kārlis Vārtiņš; Mārtiņš Matīss Zemītis
- Lyricist: Andrejs Reinis Zitmanis

Finals performance
- Semi-final result: 11th
- Semi-final points: 34

Entry chronology
- ◄ "Eat Your Salad" (2022)
- "Hollow" (2024) ►

Official performance video
- "Aijā" (First Semi-Final) on YouTube

"Aijā" (Latvian pronunciation: [ˈaijaː]; lit. 'Hushaby' or 'Shush') is a song by Latvian indie rock band Sudden Lights, released on 27 January 2023. The song represented Latvia in the Eurovision Song Contest 2023 after winning Supernova 2023, Latvia's national selection for that year's Eurovision Song Contest.

== Background ==
In interviews, the band stated that "Aijā" was made with the purpose of being a lullaby, in the sense that it would make people sleep easier. During an interview with Eurovision fan-site That Eurovision Site, they stated that due to "bad things" happening around the world, they wanted to create a song that would distract listeners from those issues. In another interview with Eurovision fan-site Eurovision Fun, the band stated that they wanted viewers to feel as if they were on a "rock concert on stage".

== Eurovision Song Contest ==
=== Supernova 2023 ===
Supernova 2023 was the Latvian national selection for the Eurovision Song Contest 2023. The format of the competition would consist of two shows: a semi-final and a final. The semi-final, which was held on 4 February 2023, featured 14 competing entries from which the top ten entries advanced to the final. The final was held on 11 February 2023, which selected the Latvian entry for Liverpool from the remaining entries. Results during the semi-final and final shows were determined by the 50/50 combination of votes from a jury panel and a public vote, with both the jury and public vote assigning points from 1–8, 10 and 12 based on the number of competing songs in the respective show.

"Aijā" performed 14th during the semi-final and came within the top ten, thus advancing to the semi-final. In the final, "Aijā" performed seventh. At the end of the voting, it was revealed that the song had managed to win the competition, and thus earn the Latvian spot for the Eurovision Song Contest 2023. It became the second Eurovision entry to feature lyrics in Latvian, after 2004.

=== At Eurovision ===
According to Eurovision rules, all nations with the exceptions of the host country and the "Big Five" (France, Germany, Italy, Spain and the United Kingdom) are required to qualify from one of two semi-finals in order to compete for the final; the top ten countries from each semi-final progress to the final. The European Broadcasting Union (EBU) split up the competing countries into six different pots based on voting patterns from previous contests, with countries with favourable voting histories put into the same pot. On 31 January 2023, an allocation draw was held which placed each country into one of the two semi-finals, as well as which half of the show they would perform in. Latvia was placed into the first semi-final, scheduled to perform in the first half.

“Aijā” performed 4th during the first semi-final on 9 May 2023, but did not qualify to the grand final.

== Charts ==
Chart performance for "Aijā"
| Chart (2023) | Peak position |
|---|---|
| Latvia Domestic Airplay (LaIPA) | 3 |
| Latvia Streaming (LaIPA) | 3 |
| Latvia Domestic Streaming (LaIPA) | 2 |

== Certifications ==
| Region | Certification | Certified units/sales |
|---|---|---|
| Latvia (LaIPA) | 2× Platinum | 8,000,000 |
