= Citi Zēni =

Latvian pop band

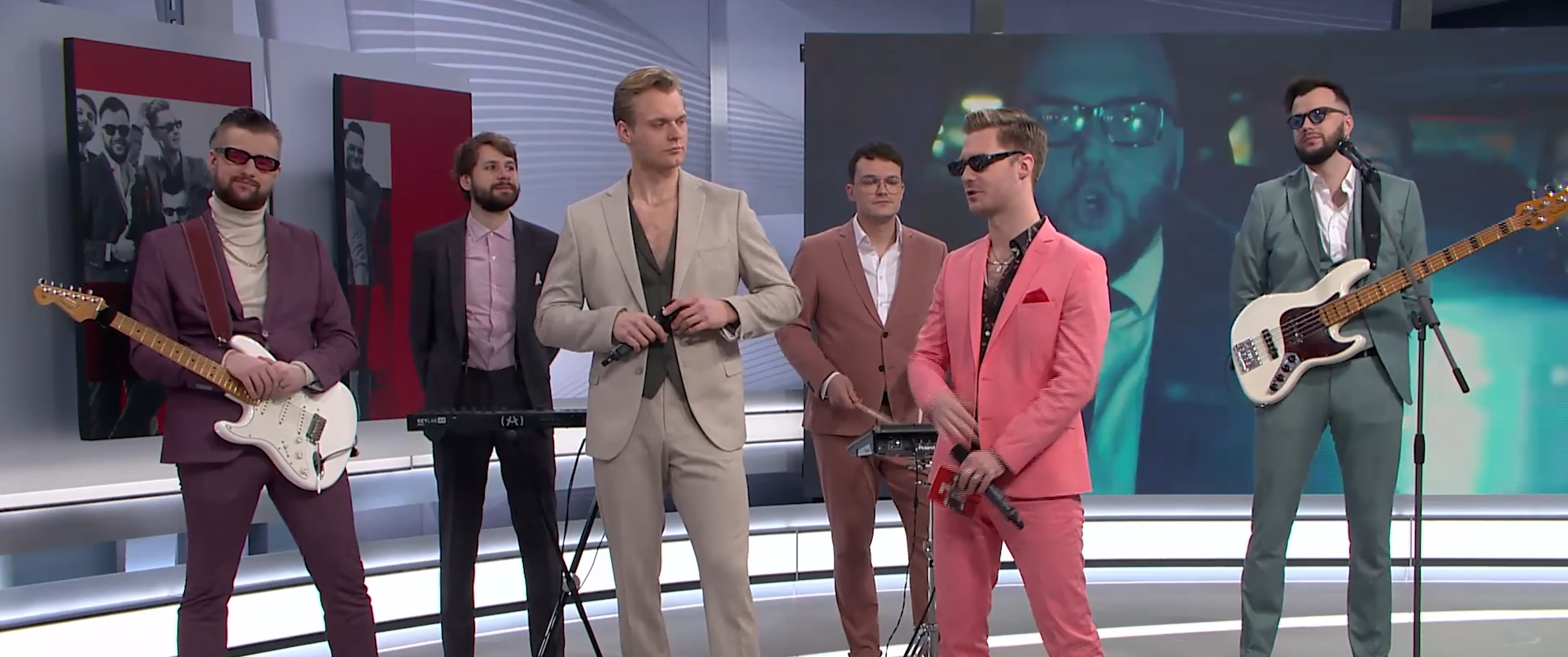
- Citi Zēni in February 2024

Background information
- Origin: Latvia
- Genres: pop rock; pop rap; funk music
- Years active: 2020–present
- Members: Jānis Pētersons; Dagnis Roziņš; Reinis Višķeris; Krišjānis Ozols; Toms Kursītis; Toms Kagainis
- Past members: Roberts Memmēns

Citi Zēni (Latvian pronunciation: [ˈtsiti ˈzæːni]; transl. "Other Boys") is a Latvian pop and hip hop band, consisting of six members. They represented Latvia in the Eurovision Song Contest in the Eurovision Song Contest 2022 with their single “Eat Your Salad”.

== History ==
Citi Zēni formed in March 2020 at a songwriting camp outside of Riga.

In 2021, the band released their debut album Suņi Iziet Ielās, which translates to Dogs Take To The Streets in English.

In 2022, the band announced their bid for Supernova 2022, with the release of their new single "Eat Your Salad". The band qualified for the final and went on to win it on 12 February 2022. As a result, they represented Latvia in the Eurovision Song Contest 2022 and failed to qualify for the grand final. The band confirmed their return to Supernova in 2025 with their song "RAMTAI" and new member Toms Kursītis, who replaced Roberts Memmēns.

== Band members ==
- Jānis Pētersons – vocals
- Dagnis Roziņš – vocals, saxophone
- Reinis Višķeris – keyboards
- Krišjānis Ozols – guitar
- Toms Kursītis – bass (2024–present)
- Toms Kagainis – drums
- Roberts Memmēns – bass, vocals (2020–2024)

== Discography ==
=== Studio albums ===
List of studio albums
Title	Album details
Suņi Iziet Ielās	Released: 28 October 2021; Label: TCLV; Formats: CD, Digital download, streaming
Cits līmenis	Released: 28 February 2024; Label: TCLV; Formats: CD, Digital download, streaming

=== Singles ===
List of singles, with selected chart positions
Title	Year	Peak chart positions			Certifications	Album
Title	Year	LAT Air.	LAT Dom. Air.	LTU	Certifications	Album
"Vienmēr kavēju"	2020	—	*	—		Suņi iziet ielās
"Parādi kas tas ir"	2020	27	*	—		Suņi iziet ielās
"Suņi iziet ielās"	2021	55	*	—		Suņi iziet ielās
"Skaistās kājas"	2021	*	*	—		Suņi iziet ielās
"Limuzīns uz krīta"	2021	*	*	—		Suņi iziet ielās
"Eat Your Salad"	2022	*	*	55	LaIPA: 2× Platinum	Non-album singles
"Lieka štuka"	2022	*	*	—	LaIPA: Gold	Non-album singles
"Vecumdienas"	2023	—	3	—		Cits līmenis
"Baļļīte" (featuring Labvēlīgais Tips)	2023	12	1	—		Cits līmenis
"Cits līmenis"	2023	—	5	—		Cits līmenis
"Ramtai"	2024	—	—	—		Non-album singles
"Galvenais (Nevīst un viss)"	2025	—	7	—		Non-album singles
"Smalkais stils"	2025	11	2	—		Non-album singles
"Novadu cīņas" (featuring Mauku Sencis, Tambura Pesto, Latgalīšu Reps and Reiks)	2026	26	3	—		Non-album singles
"Kā ir, tā ir" (with Edavārdi)	2026	18	4	—		Non-album singles
"Zimbabve"	2026	13	2	—		Non-album singles
"—" denotes items which were not released in that country or failed to chart. "*" denotes the chart did not exist at that time.

Awards and achievements
Preceded by Samanta Tina with "The Moon Is Rising"	Latvia in the Eurovision Song Contest; 2022	Succeeded by Sudden Lights with "Aijā"
