= Eat Your Salad =

2022 single by Citi Zēni

"Eat Your Salad!"

Single by Citi Zēni
- Language: English
- Released: 13 January 2022
- Length: 3:02
- Label: TCLV Records
- Songwriters: Roberts Memmēns; Jānis Pētersons; Dagnis Roziņš; Jānis Jačmenkins

Music video
- "Eat Your Salad!" on YouTube

Eurovision Song Contest 2022 entry
- Country: Latvia
- Artist: Citi Zēni
- Language: English
- Composer: Roberts Memmēns
- Lyricists: Jānis Pētersons; Dagnis Roziņš; Jānis Jačmenkins

Finals performance
- Semi-final result: 14th
- Semi-final points: 55

Entry chronology
- ◄ "The Moon Is Rising" (2021)
- "Aijā" (2023) ►

Official performance video
- "Eat Your Salad!" (First Semi-Final) on YouTube

"Eat Your Salad!" is the debut English-language song by Latvian rap-pop band Citi Zēni. The song represented Latvia in the first semi-final of the Eurovision Song Contest 2022 in Turin, Italy.

== Background ==
According to the band, the song was created "to make a hard topic easy to digest and fun to listen to." Two main sources of inspiration were named for the song: one was a vegan friend of Jānis who wore a shirt that said "Instead of meat, I eat pussy", and the other was a contestant on a Latvian TV cooking show who convinced him to change Jānis' views on the environment, and at the end, challenged him to make a song based on that ideal and "develop this into a song that would not be depressing".

The song talks about the attractiveness of being vegan and eco-friendly living. The first verse talks about eco-friendly things the group does. The second verse is filled with numerous sexual references, referring to an eco-friendly woman the group is attracted to. The chorus combines the messages of veganism and how the characteristic is sexually desirable.

== Censorship ==
During the semi-final of Eurovision 2022, the song was censored due to some of the explicit lyrics. The first line of the song was originally supposed to be "Instead of meat, I eat veggies and pussy"; however, the word "pussy" was not sung, although the crowd can be heard filling in the absent lyric.

The word "fuck" was reportedly also censored.

== Eurovision Song Contest ==
=== Supernova 2022 ===
On 7 October 2021, LTV opened a two-month submission period for interested singers and songwriters to enter the audition process for Supernova 2022. All entries were required to be by a singer-songwriter that was aged at least sixteen and a citizen of Latvia, with foreign writers allowed only if they contributed to one third or less of the entry.

After all submissions were received, a jury formed of representatives of the main radio stations in Latvia assessed the songs, only being informed of the song title (not the singer). 16 acts were selected by the jury to take part in the competition. The selected entries were announced on 5 January 2022. In addition to the initial sixteen competing artists, LTV held an online vote between 10 and 14 January 2022 to determine a seventeenth act.

The semi-final took place on 5 February 2022. Ten entries were selected by a professional jury and a televote in a 50/50 split vote. "Eat Your Salad" qualified, and moved onto the final.

The final took place on 12 February 2022. The winner was determined by a professional jury and a televote in a 50/50 split vote. "Eat Your Salad" won the final, and as a result, represented Latvia in the Eurovision Song Contest 2022.

=== At Eurovision ===
The 66th edition of the Eurovision Song Contest took place in Turin, Italy and consisted of two semi-finals on 10 May and 12 May 2022, and the grand final on 14 May 2022. According to Eurovision rules, all nations with the exceptions of the host country and the "Big Five" (France, Germany, Italy, Spain and the United Kingdom) are required to qualify from one of two semi-finals in order to compete for the final; the top ten countries from each semi-final progress to the final. The European Broadcasting Union (EBU) split up the competing countries into six different pots based on voting patterns from previous contests, with countries with favourable voting histories put into the same pot.

== Charts ==
Chart performance for "Eat Your Salad"
Chart (2022)	Peak position
Lithuania (AGATA)	55

== Certifications ==
Certifications for Eat Your Salad" (streaming)
Region	Certification	Certified units/sales
Latvia (LaIPA)	2× Platinum	8,000,000
