= Dons (singer) =

Latvian singer

- Dons performing during his "Tuvums" concert at the Daugava Stadium on 15 August, 2026

Background information
- Also known as: Art Green, Art Singer
- Born: Artūrs Šingirejs; 10 April 1984 (age 42); Brocēni, Latvia
- Genres: Pop, pop rock
- Occupations: Singer; songwriter
- Instruments: Vocals, guitar, piano
- Years active: 2003–present
- Labels: Platforma Records, DonsMusic, Universal Music
- Formerly of: Dons & Lily

Artūrs Šingirejs (born 10 April 1984), better known as Dons, is a Latvian singer and songwriter. He is one of the most popular singers in Latvia, having won the Latvian Music Recording Awards' Top Radio Hit award eight times for most played song. He represented Latvia in the Eurovision Song Contest 2024 with "Hollow".

He has released nine solo albums and has won numerous awards including Latvijas Radio's Muzikālās Banka (lit. 'Musical Bank') Song of the Year six times. At the Latvian Music Recording Awards, he has won Best Pop Album twice from five nominations for Varanasi (2014) and Tūrists (2020). He has won Best Rock Album once from two nominations with Lelle (2008) and has been nominated once for Best Pop-Rock Album with Signāls (2013). In 2024, he won the Supernova song competition with his English-language single "Hollow" to represent Latvia in the Eurovision Song Contest. Previously, he attempted to represent Latvia in the Eurovision Song Contest twice with the songs "My Religion is Freedom" (2010) and "Pēdējā Vēstule" (2014), finishing second both times in the Latvian national finals.

Born in Saldus, Latvia, Dons began his career on the Latvian reality show Talantu Fabrika (lit. 'Talent Factory') in 2003. He released a duet album, Viens Otram (2004), with fellow contestant Lily (real name Linda Kalniņa, m. 2009; div. 2013). His first solo album Lights On (2006) was mostly in English. He found success releasing his next eight albums in the Latvian language: Lelle (2008), Signāls (2013), Varanasi (2014), Sibīrija (2015), Tepat (2016), Namiņš. Kaste. Vārdi (2018), and Tūrists (2020). In 2021, he signed with Universal Music and released his ninth album Laiks on the label in August 2024. He released his EP Tuvums I in 2026.

== Early life ==
Artūrs Šingirejs was born on 10 April 1984 in Brocēni, Saldus district, Latvia to a Belarusian father and a Latvian mother, who performed professionally as a soloist in the Liepāja group Santa, led by Zigmars Liepiņš. His father was also an amateur singer who performed on the guitar; he credits his parents as being his main teachers. He has one brother and three sisters, one of whom was the first to encourage him to perform on stage at the age of four. He said about being the fourth child, "...gave me freedom: I was the fourth child in the family and I got it even more than the others. Freedom gave me the courage to dream". His mother taught him English from the age of six and he credits Freddie Mercury as one of his first musical idols. He studied piano at the Saldus Music School. He had his first solo performance at age 16 and stated, "My first performance was at school, and I realized that I wanted to do this - there is something here that binds me". He later studied culinary arts before returning to music as a profession. He learned to play the guitar and sing through self-study.

== Career ==
=== 2003–2007: Early work ===
Dons gained popularity in 2003 by participating in the Latvian reality show Talantu Fabrika (lit. 'Talent Factory'). During the show, he met and dated fellow contestant Lily (real name Linda Kalniņa). He joined Radio SWH Rock as a DJ host after winning the reality show, which he says was much more stressful than performing on stage. Dons and Lily released an English language duet album in 2004, Viens Otram (lit. 'To Each Other'). The album became a best seller in Latvia and they earned a nomination for Top Radio Hit with "Just For You" at the 2003 Latvian Music Recording Awards. In 2004, his song "Ja es būtu vējš" (lit. 'If I Were The Wind') was nominated for Top Radio Hit at the Latvian Music Recording Awards. After the success of the duet album, Dons focused on a solo career, releasing his first solo album (mostly in English) Lights On in 2006. The album was nominated for Best Rock Album and his single, "Lights Out" was nominated for Best Rock Song at the 2006 Latvian Music Recording Awards.

Afterwards, he moved between London and Los Angeles with Lily, saying in interviews at the time that she was his muse and source of inspiration; they married in 2009. While living abroad, he adopted and subsequently abandoned several stage names; first he used Art Green and later went by Art Singer while in the United States. Dons later commented on his numerous names, "Call me whatever you want. I have a lot of names. The name Art Singer I use in England is an abbreviated name. Art Green was the predecessor of Art Singer, but I somehow didn't feel that name... In Latvia I'm known more as Dons, which I chose myself. That nickname came in and dragged me along and I get along with it well". While in Los Angeles, he received four offers to be the lead singer in various rock bands.

In 2007, he performed in Zigmars Liepiņš' popular musical theatre Adata with the song "Ja Tu Man Esi" ("lit. 'If I Have You'"). The song was nominated for Top Radio Hit at the Latvian Music Recording Awards that year.

=== 2008–2014: Return to Latvia, Eurovision attempts ===
In 2008, Dons released his second solo album, Lelle (lit. 'Doll'), which was his first Latvian language album. The album was the first of many where he collaborated with lyricist Ingus Bērziņš. It won the Best Rock Album in the Latvian Music Recording Awards that year. The success of the album proved his audience preferred his music performed in Latvian over his English language music. He represented Latvia at the New Wave 2008, where he got 4th place.

In 2009, Dons participated in the television series 1000 Jūdzes Indijā (lit. '1000 miles in India') presented by Latvijas Televīzija with fellow travelers radio DJ Egon Reiter, comedian Jānis Skutelis, Edgars Zaķis and rapper Gustavo. After the series ended, he stayed in India for a month longer as a creative means of self-searching and meditation, which later reflected in his music. Still living abroad, he briefly returned to Latvia for a month to compete in the 2010 Latvian Eurovision Song Contest, finishing in second with his song "My Religion Is Freedom".

Other than sharing the songs he wrote, Dons has remained private about his activities while living abroad. In 2012, Dons returned again to Latvia, for a longer period to revive his career with a new album with songs written while in London. Writing the album's music, he worked with song lyricist Ingus Bērziņš to produce his third solo album, Signāls. He won Best Radio Hit at the 2012 and 2013 Latvian Music Recording Awards for his single "Signāls", which also won song of the year at Latvijas Radio's 2012 Muzikālās Banka (lit. 'Musical Bank'). The album was nominated for Best Pop and Rock Album at the 2013 Latvian Music Recording Awards and his video for "Darling, Darling" was nominated for Best Video.

Outside of producing and touring his album that year, he worked as a voice actor and reality show judge. He voiced and sang as the character of Olaf in the Latvian adaptation of Disney's Frozen (2013). He returned to his origins on the Latvian reality show Jaunā Talantu Fabrikā (lit. 'New Talent Factory') as a judge, where he tutored winner Aminata Savadogo and later helped produce her songs.

During this period, his marriage to Lily dissolved and officially ended in 2013. His divorce became the inspiration for his first single "Pēdējā Vēstule" ("lit. 'Last Letter'") off his next studio album, Varanasi (2014). He considers the album a continuation of his previous album Signāls, stating, "On a sensory level, the album Varanasi is full of relationships, everyday life and cognition. Musically from choir and strings to electronics and rock. I'm happy for the producers' courage not to be afraid to experiment with innovative things".

The song is very biographical, Ingus Bērziņš has once again written lyrics about my life. Varanasi, mentioned in the song, is the oldest city in India, a shrine, a mecca. I believe we each have our own Varanasi. Another finds it in church, another at work, another on TV, in agriculture or poetry. It is not even a place, it is a state of the soul. Every person at some point in their lives gets on this train and leaves for Varanasi, gets out of their comfort zone, makes drastic decisions and then starts learning how to read life

— Dons on "Pēdējā Vēstule" (lit. 'Last Letter') off the album Varanasi (2014).

In 2014, he participated in Dziesma (lit. 'Song') with "Pēdējā Vēstule" in an attempt to represent Latvia in the Eurovision Song Contest". While the song in Latvian is dedicated to his ex-wife, he stated if he had won, he would have sung a version he wrote himself in English and re-dedicate that version to his father who died in 2007. However, he finished in second place behind Aarzemnieki, losing by 97 votes, much to the surprise of many. Despite the loss at the Dziema 2014, the song won Song of the Year at both the 2013 Muzikālās Banka (Musical Bank) and the Latvian Music Recording Awards. Due to his popularity, his tour for the album had to be extended, including going from one show at Palladium Riga to six sold out nights. The album reached gold status in Latvia in less than two months after being released. He had major success at the 2014 Latvian Music Recording Awards, with Varanasi winning Pop Album of the Year and winning Song of the Year with his single "Tev Piedzims Bērns" (lit. 'Child Born to You') and Top Radio Hit with "Pāriet Bailes" (lit. 'Fear Goes Away'), which also won Song of the Year at the 2014 Muzikālās Banka (lit. 'Musical Bank') awards.

Inspired by the success of Varanasi, Dons embarked on a 25,000-kilometre (16,000 mi) journey via the Trans-Siberian Railway from Moscow to Vladivostok, Siberia, and later flying to Delhi, India, and traveling by train to Varanasi in 2014. About his motivation, Dons said, "Although in the song ('Pēdējā Vēstule'), Varanasi is a metaphor for peace of mind, which we can also find in the beet fields, on the stage, at the wheel of a car - wherever there is a place. I know that in any case, getting to this city will be emotional". Traveling alone, he brought only the necessities and his guitar in a creative search for materials for his next album.

=== 2015–2020: Rise in popularity ===
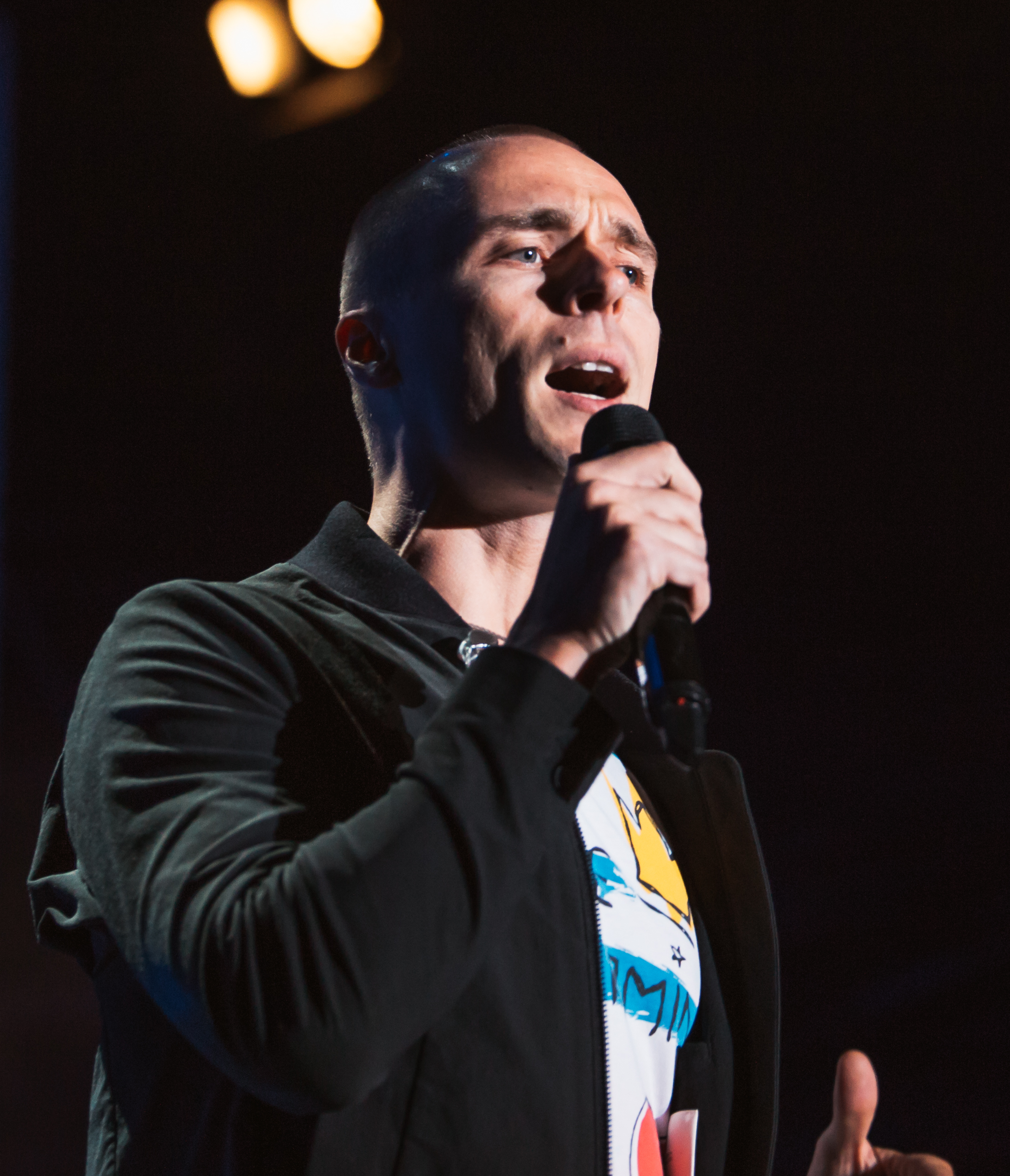
Dons performing at Summer Sound on 28 July 2017 at Jūrmalas Park in Liepāja, Latvia

With his material from his Trans-Siberian Railway journey, Dons released his fifth solo album Sibīrija (lit. 'Siberia') in 2015 with lyrics again by Ignus Bērziņš. The first single "Medus Pods" (lit. 'Honey Pot') was written while stationed near Lake Baikal during his Siberian trip. Dons noted about his ongoing songwriting relationship with the lyricist Bērziņš: "My songs are about myself, my pain and my joys, my dreams and my disappointments, otherwise I can't write. This is exactly the case with 'Medus Pods'. After music and our conversations, Ingus can read the state of my soul very well..." His next two singles from Sibīrija were "Pašā Ielas Galā" (lit. 'At the Very End of the Street') and "Dieviņš" (lit. 'God'). "Medus Pods" (lit. 'Honey Pot') was nominated for Best Song and Best Video at the 2014 Latvian Music Recording Awards. Sibīrija was nominated for Best Album, "Pašā Ielas Galā" (lit. 'At the Very End of the Street') won Best Video and "Dieviņš" (lit. 'God') won Top Radio Hit and was nominated for Alfa's Song of the Year at the 2015 Latvian Music Recording Awards.

In 2015, he was a judge in the first season of the Latvian television show Supernova, used to select songs to represent Latvia in the Eurovision Song Contest. He reprised the same role at the Latvia in the Eurovision Song Contest 2017.

Dons released his sixth solo album Tepat (lit. 'Here') in October 2016 which was the first album where he wrote the lyrics along with the music. The album was stylistically different from his previous albums, featuring a simpler instrumentation but "emotionally richer". The tour featured two nights at Latvia's Arēna Rīga, making Dons one of the few domestic groups capable of bringing in a crowd large enough for that arena. The single "Tepat" (lit. 'Here') was nominated for Alfa's Song of the Year and Top Radio Hits at the 2017 Latvian Music Recording Awards.

In 2017, he performed with the Riga Dome Choir School on the song "Zelta Kamanas" (lit. 'Golden Sleigh').

In February 2018, Dons released his seventh solo album, Namiņš. Kaste. Vārdi (lit. 'Cottage. Box. Names'). He featured a variety of lyricists including himself, Ingus Bērziņš, Arnis Račinskis, Ģirts Rozentāls and Kaspars Ansons. The album featured some songs that were originally written in 2010 while in London. The fourth single from the album was "Salauzta Sirds" (lit. 'A Broken Heart'), which was a collaboration with Ozols. That single won Top Radio Hit and Best Song at the 2019 Latvian Music Recording awards and the album was nominated for Best Pop Album.

In 2018, he played the lead role in the 30th-anniversary production of the rock opera, Lāčplēsis, based on the Latvian national epic of the same name. Some people doubted his abilities to perform in the lead role, however, Igo who performed as lead in the original production noted after hearing his performance, "Dons has a very wide range of voices, he timbres his tone very masterfully. I have never had any doubts about him, because purely technically he is capable of very, very much. Probably even more than people know and can imagine. Therefore, I had no doubts and no question as to whether he could cope with this task."

In 2020, he participated in a number of collaborations. He worked with 20 Latvian musicians to create the charity anthem, "Es zinu, Tu esi" to raise money for domestic violence victims. He released another song "Mans Eņģelis" (lit. 'My Angel') for the charity Angels over Latvia, which raised money to benefit children in need of medical care. He co-wrote Aminata Savadogo's song "Nejauc man prātu" (lit. 'Do not confuse me'). In response to the Latvian government lack of support for the cultural sector during the COVID-19 pandemic in Latvia, Dons and other leading Latvian musicians expressed their criticism with a video composition called "Klusums" (lit. 'Silence').

On 24 November 2020, Dons released his eighth solo album, Tūrists (lit. 'Tourists'), which featured 10 songs from a total of 27 he had written. The lead single "Es Nāktu Mājās" (lit. 'I Would Come Home') became popular, winning Song of the Year at the 2019 Muzikālās Banka (lit. 'Musical Bank') and tying him for most ever with Prāta Vētra (Brainstorm). At the 2020 Latvian Music Recording Awards, it was nominated for Best Song and Song of the Year and won Best Video. His single "Tūrists" ("lit. 'Tourists'") was nominated for most valuable song during the 2020 Muzikālās Banka (lit. 'Musical Bank'). The album won Best Pop Album at the 2021 Latvian Music Recording Awards.

=== 2021–2023: Universal Music signing and subsequent singles ===
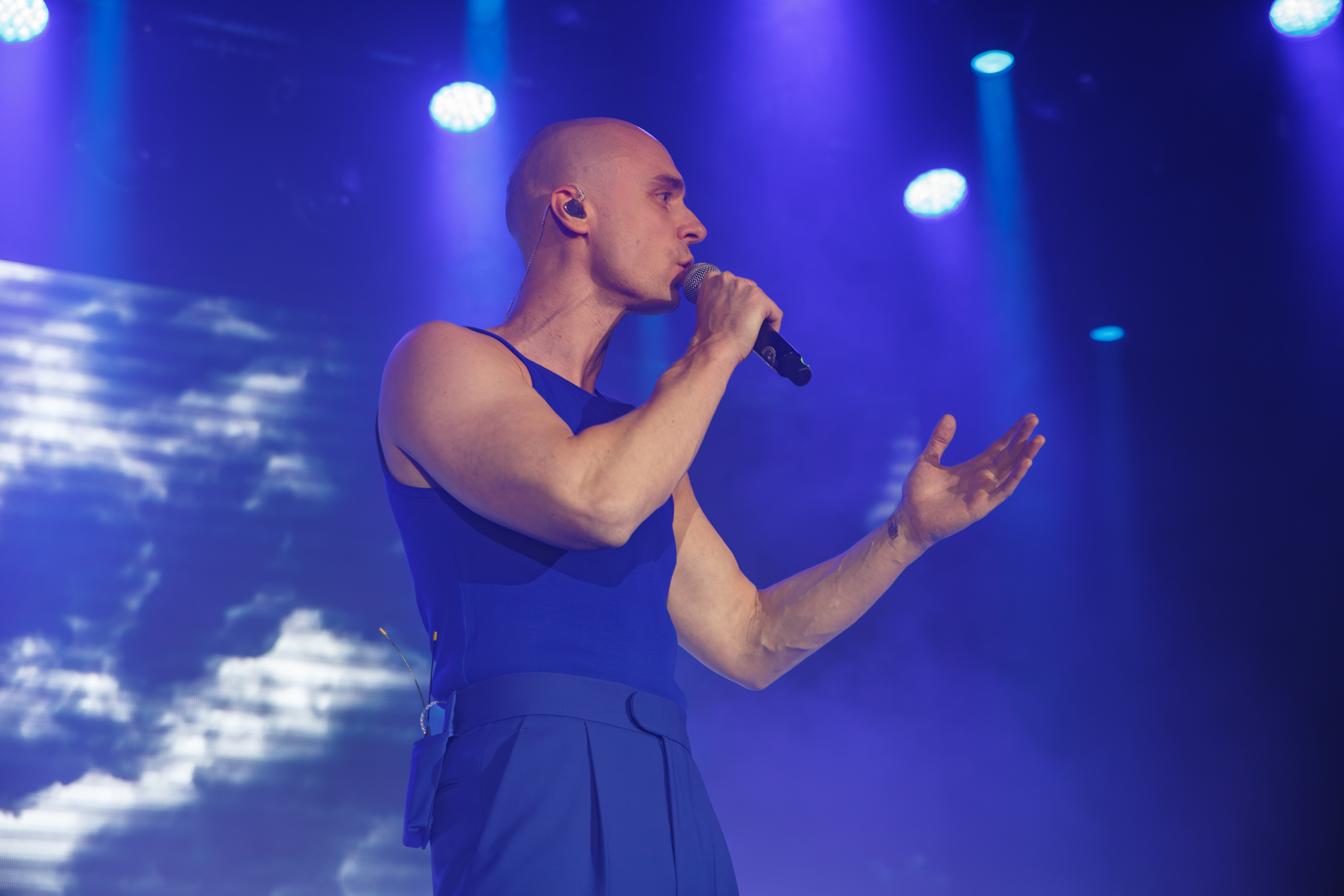
Dons performing at a pre-party event for Eurovision 2024

In March 2021, Dons participated in an open letter to the government that was signed by leading Latvian musicians, artists, writers and other creatives. In it, they criticized the government's ongoing lack of support for copyright and compensation laws for their works when it came to data carriers. A few days later, he released the single "Piedošana" (lit. 'Forgiveness'), teaming up with Intars Busulis and Prāta Vētra (Brainstorm) to perform it. Dons summarized the song as, "Forgiveness is an art we learn all our lives. Sometimes it seems like we've learned it, but new challenges come and we have to start all over again". On 18 April 2021, he performed as a guest singer on Balss Maskā (lit. 'Voice in a Mask') as the Evening Star, singing "The Best" by Bonnie Tyler.

In August 2021, Dons announced he had signed with Universal Music. His first single with the new label was released on 16 September 2021 titled "Tas rakstīts debesīs (Piena ceļš)" (lit. 'It's Written in the Heavens (Milky Way)'). The song was cowritten with DJ Rudd (Rūdolfs Budze) and Aminata Savadogo about an admiration "of space, of infinity, of stars, about possibilities and probabilities". It was nominated for three 2022 Latvian Music Recording Awards for Top Radio Hit, song of the year and ELVI song of the year and along with "Piedošana" (lit. 'Forgiveness'), his collaboration with Prata Vetra and Intars Busulis, made the final 15 for most valuable song of the 2021 Muzikālā Banka (lit. 'Musical Bank'). "Tas rakstīts debesīs (Piena ceļš)" (lit. 'It's Written in the Heavens (Milky Way)') finished in third place and "Piedošana" (lit. 'Forgiveness') finished in seventh place during the 2021 Muzikālā Banka (lit. 'Musical Bank') finals.

In February 2022, Dons released a new single, "Tavs pieskāriens" (lit. 'Your touch'). He also announced a summer concert at the ruins of the Sigulda Castle. In May 2022, Dons collaborated with Latvian rapper rolands če on his next single, "Brīnišķīga diena" (lit. 'Wonderful Day'). At the 2022 Muzikālā Banka (lit. 'Musical Bank') finals, "Tavs pieskāriens" (lit. 'Your touch') finished in 7th place. At the 2023 Latvian Music Recording Awards known as the Zelta Mikrofons (lit. 'Golden Microphones'), his single "Tavs pieskāriens" (lit. 'Your touch') was nominated for song of the year, video of the year, top radio hit and people's choice for (ELVI) song of the year. His duet "Brīnišķīga diena" (lit. 'Wonderful Day') with rolands če was also nominated for top radio hit. "Tavs pieskāriens" (lit. 'Your touch') won song of the year and Top Radio Hit.

In anticipation of his next album, Dons released the single, "Divatā" (lit. 'In Two') in May 2023. The lyrics are by Latvian poet Marts Pujāts, who says, "There have always been forces of attraction and repulsion in relationships. The song 'Divatā' holds the hope that attraction will prevail, and two loving people will eventually be able to find their way to each other". The single was nominated for ELVI Song of the Year and won Top Radio Hit at the 2024 Latvian Music Recording Awards. On 17 and 18 July 2023, Dons performed as Quasimodo in Zigmars Liepiņš' operatic melodrama Parīzes Dievmātes katedrāle (lit. 'Notre-Dame de Paris') as part of the Jūrmala Festival. In September 2023, Dons released his next single "Lauzto šķēpu karaļvalsts" (lit. 'Kingdom of Broken Spears'), inspired by the "times when you feel crushed and bent under the weight, the belief that time will heal and allow you to get back up can be the only thing that gives you strength". The single won Most Valuable Song at the 2023 Muzikālās Banka (lit. 'Musical Bank') awards and its music video was nominated for Best Video at the 2024 Latvian Music Recording Awards. He also announced a stadium concert at Daugava Stadium taking place in August 2024 to promote his next album, Laiks (lit. 'Time').

In October 2023, Dons joined the Latvian music competition show Paaudžu duelis (lit. 'Duel of Generations') as the leader of the younger 2000s team. Contestants answered trivia questions and performed songs from the different music eras, with losers being sent home via fan votes.

=== 2024–present: Supernova win, Eurovision finals ===
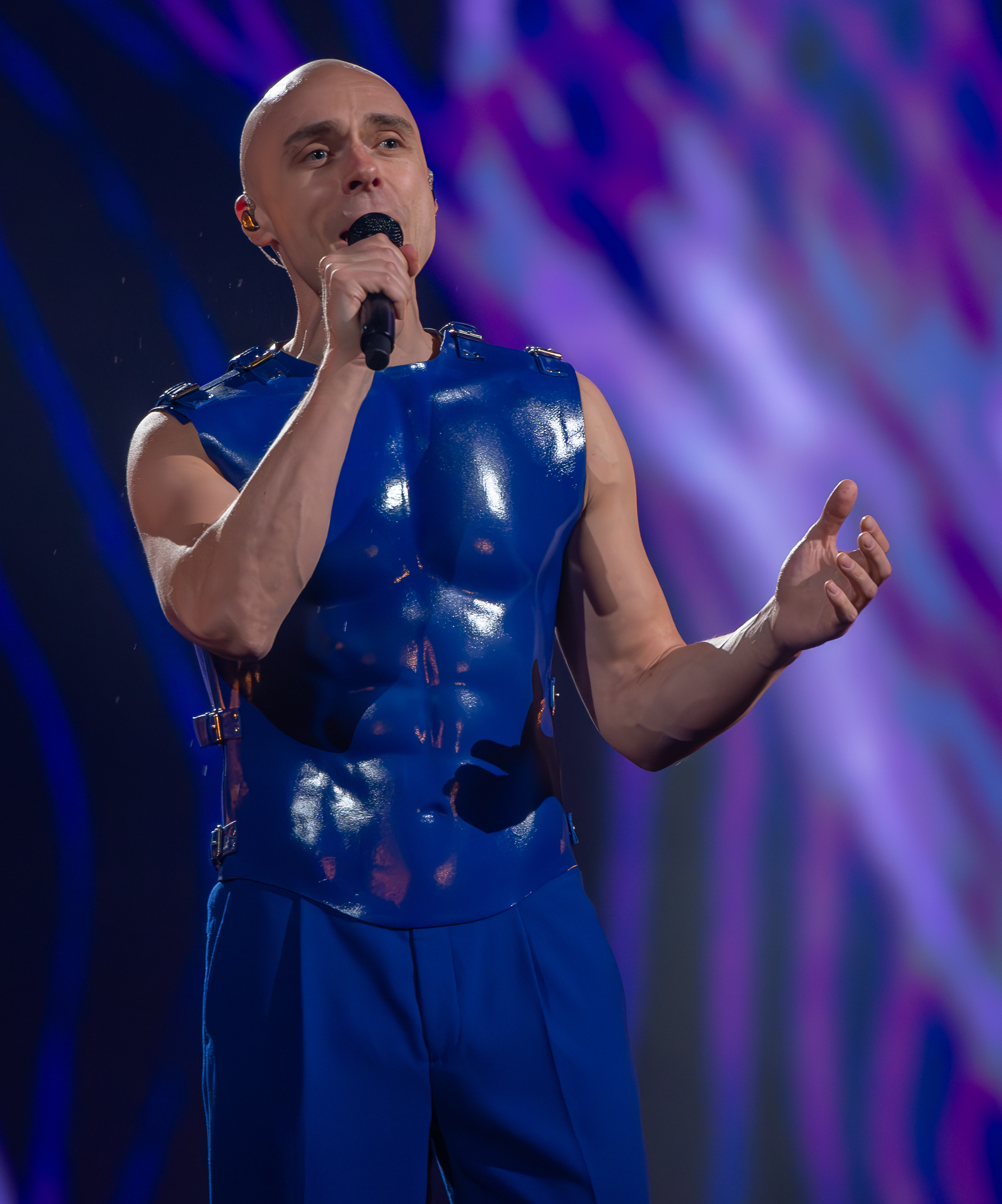
Dons at the final rehearsal for Eurovision 2024

In January 2024, Dons released "Hollow", his first English-language single since 2020, with which he was selected to compete in Supernova 2024, Latvia's national final for the Eurovision Song Contest 2024. "Lauzto šķēpu karaļvalsts" (lit. 'Kingdom of Broken Spears') is the Latvian version of "Hollow", which was written first. According to Dons, the songs are different from each other; Hollow is based on the relevant issue today of not following the crowds and staying true to oneself with Dons elaborating: "By the time we finished 'Hollow', we all felt inside that we had created something that made time stand still". Dons advanced to the final of Supernova, which he won in a landslide with 33,000 more audience votes than the runners-up and placed first with the jury.

In order to focus on his Eurovision preparations, Dons announced he was postponing the release of his next album, Laiks (lit. 'Time') from April to August 2024.

Having been predicted by bookmakers not to qualify and given the lowest chances by odds to qualify from the second semi-final, Dons defied pre-contest expectations and qualified for the grand final, placing 7th out of 16 with 72 points. His qualification sent Latvia to their first final since 2016 (represented by Justs Sirmais with "Heartbeat") and broke Latvia's seven-year consecutive non-qualification streak. After advancing, he said, "Bookmakers are bookmakers, but they also set the tone. Of course, it's not pleasant when you see that you've been put in last place. You have nothing to lose! Maybe that helped a little. Throwing everything asides and just going out and doing what I love the most. Bookies - that's their job. Let them do their job, we'll do ours." Dons placed 16th out of 25 in the grand final with 64 points.

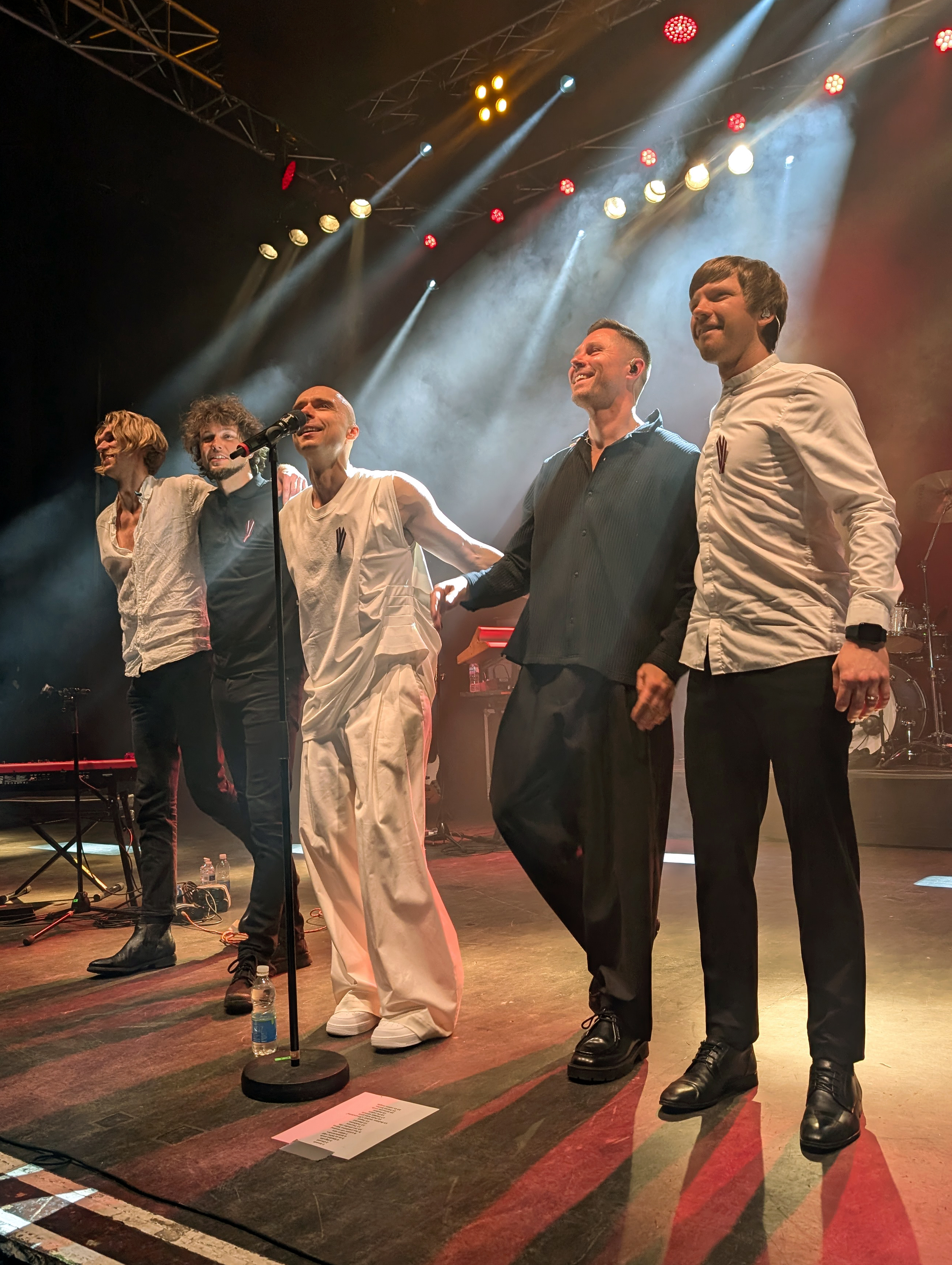
Dons (and band) performing in London at the Shepherd's Bush Empire (November 2024)

Following up his performance at Eurovision, Dons released another English language single called "Dark" in May 2024. He released a Latvian version called "Sāp" (lit. 'Pain') in preparation for the release of his ninth studio album Laiks (lit. 'Time'). Dons says about his single, "I want to allow each listener to experience the story of the song "Sāp" through his own emotional prism. A story about falling in love, about the beginning of a relationship and illusions that disappear with time". Ahead of his largest concert to date at Daugava Stadium (Riga), he released his album Laiks (lit. 'Time') on 1 August 2024 along with the single "Bultiņa melnā" (lit. 'Black Arrow'), which he says was written to remind "not only myself, but also my listeners that in moments when we feel stuck, we need to calm down a little, let go and start again!" His "Laiks" (lit. 'Time') concert at Daugava Stadium on 17 August 2024 included songs from the very beginning of his career to his latest works. Over 22,000 people attended the "Laiks" concert, and Dons expressed that seeing everyone come together through his music made him realize he "had not lived in vain". He reflected on the crowd, saying, "Yes, that was strength! And this strength is truly within us. We are a people who do everything with sincerity—whether it's emotions, setting a table, cooking a soup, or creating a song—it's all real!" Following this concert, Dons announced he would perform "Time" in London on 18 November, 2024 at the Shepherd's Bush Empire.

Dons was announced as a judge for the debut season of Ir Talants, the Latvian version of the popular global series Got Talent. On 16 October, 2024, the Latvian Music Producers Association presented Dons with a platinum certificate for "Hollow"; the platinum award is given to songs that have been streamed 4 million times or more. In 2024, the Latvian Music Producers Association announced the creation of the GAMMA awards, which celebrates "all aspects of the Latvian music industry". Dons won Male Solo Artist of the Year and Hit of the year for "Hollow"; he also was nominated for Pop Artist of the Year; "Hollow" was nominated for Most Streamed Song of the Year; and his concert Laiks was nominated for Live Performance/Concert of the Year and Musical Event of the Year.

In September 2025, Dons released a new single, "Jau rīt" (lit. 'Tomorrow'), and announced his upcoming album and stadium concert, Tuvums (lit. 'Closeness'), scheduled for August 2026 at Daugava Stadium (Riga). He released the title track "Tuvums" (lit. 'Closeness'), which also has an English version called "I'll love you until I die"; he co-wrote it with DJ Rudd (Rūdolfs Budze). He said the song "is about my favorite topic: human relationships. You don't always have to be physically close to feel closeness; it can appear in memories, feelings, thoughts. Sometimes it seems that nothing is more valuable than the presence of another person, especially when it seems that the whole world is breaking in half - then this support is felt even in thoughts". The music video features Latvian rally driver Mārtiņš Sesks. The single won Most Valuable Song at the 2025 Muzikālās Banka (lit. 'Musical Bank') awards, and also the most donated song charity marathon “Dod pieci! 2025” organized by Latvijas Radio 5.

In April 2026, Dons released the single "Debesjums" (lit. 'Vast Sky/Heavens'), which was co-written with British producer Christopher Harris and Chris Noah. It was released in part one of his album Tuvums I (lit. 'Closeness') which will be released in two parts: "The songs for the new album take more time - I want to live with my feelings longer before I put them into songs. It's a way to preserve the memories of what I experienced". The five-track EP Tuvums I was released June 30, 2026, along with the next single "Sirdsbalss" (lit. 'Voice of the Heart'). Over 25,000 people attended his concert Tuvums at the Daugava Stadium.

In September 2026, he was once again a judge on season two of Ir Talants, the Latvian version of the popular global series Got Talent.

== Music style ==
The thing with the lyrics is that – you see, I mean one thing at other times, but the listener tells me that in him the lyrics have awakened something else. That's also why I never again blurt out any meanings about lyrics. Everyone finds something of themselves in these lyrics. When, for example, we play the songs "Pāriet bailes" or "Dieviņš" or "Pēdējā vēstule" at concerts, and when you see a person singing along with tears in their eyes or with joy on their face, then you realize that the song is no longer mine. Then it is comparable to the pride of parents – when they are proud of their child, who has grown into a good person.

— Dons in June 2023

Dons is known for playing only a few large shows for each tour, as he prefers that "each song has its own story, including my own. And the story is an experience. Maybe that's why I don't perform so often". He has performed in Latvia's largest arenas including the Palladium Riga, Arena Riga and the Daugava National Stadium. He lives in "two cycles - concerts or album recording" and when he is recording an album, he cannot perform live and vice versa.

=== Lyrics, song meanings ===
Dons is a long-time collaborator with lyricist Ingus Bērziņš, who he considers one of the best poets in Latvia. Bērziņš' lyrics are sometimes criticized as making little sense: Normunds Vucāns of ParMuziku (an online magazine produced by Latvian Music Producers Association) writes, "Unfortunately, these thoughts are hidden behind such unsuccessful and illogical lyrics that the idea is absolutely not understood, and the question arises as to whether the author himself understands what he has created." However, Dons says he knows the meaning of all the lyrics, appreciating that Bērziņš is adventurous with his writings. In his later albums, Don began to write his own words instead of relying on Bērziņš, saying, "Recently, however, our cooperation has been less frequent, because I have started writing lyrics myself. In the past, maybe I didn't have anything to say or I couldn't say it, but now I have something to say. But now and then I send him my texts to read". Dons has worked with other lyricists though and has no issues singing others' lyrics as long as they fit his melodies.

Due to the popularity of some of his songs, he stated how he had to distance the personal origins of those songs from the listeners so that the music can "belong" to them, saying:

"I have a song ("Kolekcionārs" lit. 'Collectors', lyrics by Ingus Bērziņš based on John Fowles' The Collector) on the album Lelle with a message written about tragic events. I remember once telling the true story at a concert and there was a terrible silence in the audience. Of course, later the audience came back to life, but in this little moment of silence, I saw that the audience is in tears, because the story of the song is really heavy. After this incident, I decided - no, with my private stories about songs, at least in concerts, it is better to slow down.

So I say that everyone has the right to their own version and I have no right to interfere in this interpretation... Other times it's cool to leave listeners with a subtext to the lyrics. And response, the listeners unravel exactly what I had in the song! Other times you will find out something like you had never looked at this song. Even an example with the same song "Kolekcionārs" lit. 'Collectors' - it can be like a ballad of love. It can too! I didn't see it that way, I saw a very gloomy scene, but people see something like that there. Not bad! I'm interested in new interpretations".

=== Musical performances ===
Dons says about his music that the "thought is always the same - a story about emotions and feelings, a story about love and experience". He says in his performances that his emotions are real, not an act; having taking no acting classes, he said, "I have to let it all in to get my emotions out". An example of his acting skills is his performance in Zigmars Liepiņš' popular musical theatre Adata where he performed in 33 of 70 performances and by the 20th performance, he would be in tears after the final song. A fellow actor in the musical advised him he was playing with "fire and blades" by deeply feeling the character he was portraying. He said he has turned down opportunities "because I'm afraid that I'll lose myself or burn out." For his music video of "Hollow", journalists had noted his acting skills but Dons said, "When they tear my clothes and skin, it all happens for real. I heard that foreign journalists and reviewers commented on that acting - but it really hurt me, I'm not an actor. If I'm in pain, it looks like it".

== Personal life ==
When asked if there's a difference between his stage personality and his private self, Dons said, "Not at all, Dons is maybe louder than Artūrs. Artūrs is quieter and calmer. I'd say they're twin brothers. Artūrs is lazier than Dons, that's the only difference. When there's work to be done, Dons will always drive Artūrs to work". Dons is avid about fitness, exercise and being a yoga practitioner. He is a fan of the National Basketball Association. He often travels around the world, having lived in London and the United States. He owns the Engure Café with Kaspars Roga, who is the drummer of Prāta Vētra (Brainstorm).

Dons was married to Lily (real name Linda Kalniņa), whom he met while as a contestant on the Latvian reality show Talantu Fabrikā (lit. 'Talent Factory'). The two were married from 2009 until 2013. He is currently in a relationship with Madara Mālmane.

== Discography ==
=== Studio albums ===
List of studio albums, with selected details
Title	Details	Peak chart positions
Title	Details	LAT
Viens otram (with Lily)	Released: 2004; Label: Platforma Records; Formats: Physical	*
Lights On	Released: 15 August 2006; Label: Platforma Records; Formats: Physical, digital download, streaming	*
Lelle	Released: 19 June 2008; Label: Platforma Records; Formats: Physical, digital download, streaming	*
Signāls	Released: 20 May 2013; Label: Platforma Records; Formats: Physical, digital download, streaming	*
Varanasi	Released: 13 February 2014; Label: DonsMusic; Formats: Physical, digital download, streaming	*
Sibīrija	Released: 18 February 2015; Label: DonsMusic; Formats: Physical, digital download, streaming	58
Tepat	Released: 14 October 2016; Label: DonsMusic; Formats: Physical, digital download, streaming	28
Namiņš. Kaste. Vārdi	Released: 14 February 2018; Label: DonsMusic; Formats: Physical, digital download, streaming	13
Tūrists	Released: 24 November 2020; Label: DonsMusic; Formats: Physical, digital download, streaming	*
Laiks	Released: 1 August 2024; Label: Universal Music; Formats: Physical, digital download, streaming	*
"—" denotes items which were not released in that country or failed to chart. "*" denotes that the chart did not exist at that time.

=== Singles ===
==== Charted singles ====
List of singles, with year, album and chart positions
Title	Year	Peak chart positions					Certifications	Album or EP
Title	Year	LAT Air.	LAT Dom. Air.	LAT Stream.	LAT Dom. Stream.	LTU	Certifications	Album or EP
"Pāriet Bailes"	2014	*	*	*	41	*		Varanasi
"Medus Pods"	2015	*	*	—	75	*		Sibīrija
"Pašā Ielas Galā"	2015	*	*	—	58	*		Sibīrija
"Dieviņš"	2015	*	*	—	46	*		Sibīrija
"Pastnieks"	2016	*	*	—	88	*		Tepat
"Tepat"	2016	*	*	—	36	*		Tepat
"Tev pieder rīts"	2016	*	*	—	15	*		Tepat
"Pa ceļam"	2017	*	*	—	7	*		Namiņš. Kaste. Vārdi
"Zelta kamanas"	2017	*	*	—	12	*		Non-album single
"Salauzta sirds" (featuring Ozols)	2018	—	*	2	—	—		Namiņš. Kaste. Vārdi
"Ludzu vel neaizej"	2019	—	*	18	*	—		Non-album single
"Ilgoties man nesanāk"	2020	5	*	—	*	—		Tūrists
"Divatā"	2023	7	1	—	—	—		Laiks
"Lauzto šķēpu karaļvalsts"	2023	15	1	12	1	—	LaIPA: Gold	Laiks
"Hollow"	2024	20	3	5	1	48	LaIPA: 2× Platinum	Non-album single
"Sāp"	2024	14	2	—	—	—		Laiks
"Bultiņa melnā"	2024	12	1	—	—	—		Laiks
"Jau rīt"	2025	6	1	—	—	—		Non-album single
"Tuvums"	2025	4	1	1	1	—		Tuvums
"Debesjums"	2026	5	1	—	6	—		Tuvums
"Sirdsbalss"	2026	13	2	—	—	—		Tuvums
"—" denotes a recording that did not chart or was not released in that territory. "*" denotes that the chart did not exist at that time.

==== Other singles ====
Title	Year	Album or EP
"Just For You"	2003	Viens otram (with Lily)
"Viss jau ir bijis"	2003	Viens otram (with Lily)
"Dzeltens klavesīns"	2004	Viens otram (with Lily)
"Ja es būtu vējš"	2004	Viens otram (with Lily)
"Once In My Lifetime"	2004	Viens otram (with Lily)
"Soul Inqisition"	2004	Viens otram (with Lily)
"Aizver dienu"	2005	Non-album single
"Good Morning My Love"	2005	Zingo hiti 2005
"Just For You"	2006	Lights On
"Lights Out"	2006	Lights On
"Mr. Greene"	2006	Lights On
"When Love Turns To Pain"	2006	Lights On
"American Lovebite"	2006	Lights On
"Vēl nav tik vēls"	2006	Latviešu Rokmūzikas Izlase
"Tukšums"	2007	Lelle
"Kolekcionārs"	2007	Lelle
"Ja Tu man esi"	2007	Lelle
"Leila"	2008	Lelle
"Mans eņģelis"	2009	Non-album single
"My Religion is Freedom"	2010	Non-album single
"Signāls"	2012	Signāls
"Māsa upe"	2013	Signāls
"Darling, Darling" (English version of Māsa upe)	2013	Signāls
"Par Zilo Kleitu"	2013	Signāls
"Pēdējā vēstule"	2014	Varanasi
"Atblide"	2014	Varanasi
"Tev piedzims bērns"	2014	Varanasi
"Vilks"	2015	Sibīrija
"Varenliels"	2017	Namiņš. Kaste. Vārdi
"Namiņš"	2018	Namiņš. Kaste. Vārdi
"Es nāktu mājās"	2019	Tūrists
"Tūrists"	2020	Tūrists
"Mans enģelis"	2020	Non-album singles
"Piedošana" (with Prāta Vētra and Intars Busulis)	2021	Non-album singles
"Tas rakstīts debesīs (Piena ceļš)"	2021	Non-album singles
"Tavs pieskāriens"	2022	Non-album singles
"Brīnišķīga diena" (with Rolands Če)	2022	Non-album singles
"Dark"	2024	Non-album singles

=== Other charted songs ===
Title	Year	Peak chart positions	Album or EP
Title	Year	LAT Dom. Stream.	Album or EP
"Taureņi"	2016	17	Tepat

== Filmography ==
=== Concert tour videos ===
Year	Title (information)	Reference
2014	Koncertieraksts Dons Varanasi: DVD release: May 29, 2014; Nominated for Best Concert Video at the 2014 Latvian Music Recording Awards	
2017	Dons. Tepat. Koncerts arēnā Rīga: DVD release: July 6, 2017; Won Best Concert Video at the 2018 Latvian Music Recording Awards	

=== Film/television ===
Year	Title	Role	Notes	Ref.
2003	Talantu Fabrika (lit. 'Talent Factory')	Reality Show Contestant	Participant	
2009	1000 jūdzes Indijā (lit. '1000 miles in India')	Participate/host		
2013	Frozen (Latvian adaptation)	Olaf	Voice actor	
2013	Jaunā Talantu Fabrika (lit. 'New Talent Factory')	Judge		
2015	Supernova	Judge for Latvia in the Eurovision Song Contest 2015		
2017	Supernova	Judge for Latvia in the Eurovision Song Contest 2017		
2023	Paaudžu duelis (lit. 'Duel of Generations')	Team leader		
2023	Gudrs, vēl gudrāks (lit. 'Smart, Even Smarter')	Celebrity contestant		
2024	Ir Talants (Latvian version of Got Talent)	Judge		
2026	Ir Talants 2 (Latvian version of Got Talent)	Judge		

=== Theater ===
Year	Title	Role	Venue	Ref.
2007	Adata	Singer	Latvian National Theatre	
2018	Lāčplēsis	Lead role (Lāčplēsis)	Arēna Rīga	

== Awards ==
The Annual Latvian Music Recording Awards (equivalent to the Grammy Awards) presents the Zelta Mikrofons (lit. 'Golden Microphones') awards to the best music recordings of all genres from the previous year, which are evaluated by a professional jury. In 2016, due to the decision of Latvian Music Producers Association members, the title of the award was changed to the year in which the relevant ceremony is held therefore no awards were listed using this year. The Top Radio Hits award is given to the song that has received most annual airplay and reflects the most popular song that year: Dons has won this award a total of eight times from 18 nominations. He has won Best Pop Album twice from five nominations for Varanasi (2014) and Tūrists (lit. 'Tourists', 2020). He has won Best Rock Album once from two nominations with Lelle (2008) and has been nominated once for Best Pop-Rock Album.

Latvijas Radio presents the annual Muzikālās Banka (lit. 'Musical Bank') award to the most valuable pop and rock song, which is selected based on audience votes and evaluation by a professional jury. Dons has won this award a total of six times.

In 2024, the Latvian Association of Performers and Producers (LaIPA) initiated the creation of a new award called GAMMA, that encompasses all aspects of the Latvian music industry and offers a new approach to recognizing industry excellence, representing and championing the industry throughout the year.

Year	Nominated work	Category	Award	Result	Notes	Ref.
2003	"Just For You"	Top Radio Hit	Latvian Music Recording Awards	Nominated	_{duet as Dons & Lily}	
2004	"Ja es būtu vējš" (lit. 'If I Were The Wind')	Top Radio Hit	Latvian Music Recording Awards	Nominated		
2006	Lights On	Best Rock Album	Latvian Music Recording Awards	Nominated		
2006	"Lights Out"	Best Rock Song	Latvian Music Recording Awards	Nominated		
2007	"Tukšums" (lit. 'Emptiness')	Best Rock Song	Latvian Music Recording Awards	Nominated		
2007	"Ja Tu Man Esi" (lit. 'If You Are Me')	Top Radio Hit	Latvian Music Recording Awards	Nominated		
2008	Lelle	Best Rock Album	Latvian Music Recording Awards	Won		
2012	"Signāls"	Top Radio Hit	Latvian Music Recording Awards	Won		
2012	"Signāls"	Song of the Year	Muzikālās Banka (lit. 'Musical Bank')	Won		
2013	Signāls	Best Pop-Rock Album	Latvian Music Recording Awards	Nominated		
2013	"Darling, Darling"	Video of the Year	Latvian Music Recording Awards	Nominated		
2013	"Signāls"	Top Radio Hit	Latvian Music Recording Awards	Won		
2013	"Māsa upe" (lit. 'Sister River')	Top Radio Hit	Latvian Music Recording Awards	Nominated		
2013	"Pēdējā Vēstule" (lit. 'Last Letter')	Best Song	Latvian Music Recording Awards	Won		
2013	"Pēdējā Vēstule" (lit. 'Last Letter')	Alfa's Song of the Year	Latvian Music Recording Awards	Won		
2013	"Pēdējā Vēstule" (lit. 'Last Letter')	Song of the Year	Muzikālās Banka (lit. 'Musical Bank')	Won		
2014	Varanasi	Best Pop Album	Latvian Music Recording Awards	Won		
2014	Varanasi	Best Concert Video	Latvian Music Recording Awards	Nominated		
2014	"Medus Pods" (lit. 'Honey Pot')	Best Video	Latvian Music Recording Awards	Nominated		
2014	"Tev Piedzims Bērns" (lit. 'Child Born to You')	Best Video	Latvian Music Recording Awards	Nominated		
2014	"Tev Piedzims Bērns" (lit. 'Child Born to You')	Song of the Year	Latvian Music Recording Awards	Won		
2014	"Medus Pods" (lit. 'Honey Pot')	Song of the Year	Latvian Music Recording Awards	Nominated		
2014	"Pāriet Bailes" (lit. 'Fear Goes Away')	Top Radio Hit	Latvian Music Recording Awards	Won		
2014	"Pāriet Bailes" (lit. 'Fear Goes Away')	Alfa's Song of the Year	Latvian Music Recording Awards	Nominated		
2014	"Pāriet Bailes" (lit. 'Fear Goes Away')	Song of the Year	Muzikālās Banka (lit. 'Musical Bank')	Won		
2015	Sibīrija	Best Pop Album	Latvian Music Recording Awards	Nominated		
2015	"Dieviņš" (lit. 'God')	Alfa's Song of the Year	Latvian Music Recording Awards	Nominated		
2015	"Dieviņš" (lit. 'God')	Top Radio Hit	Latvian Music Recording Awards	Won		
2015	"Pašā Ielas Galā" (lit. 'At the Very End of the Street')	Top Radio Hit	Latvian Music Recording Awards	Nominated		
2015	"Pašā Ielas Galā" (lit. 'At the Very End of the Street')	Best Video	Latvian Music Recording Awards	Won		
2015	"Pašā Ielas Galā" (lit. 'At the Very End of the Street')	Best Song	Latvian Music Recording Awards	Nominated		
2015	"Dieviņš" (lit. 'God')	Best Song	Latvian Music Recording Awards	Nominated		
2017	"Tepat" (lit. 'Here')	Alfa's Song of the Year	Latvian Music Recording Awards	Nominated		
2017	"Tepat" (lit. 'Here')	Top Radio Hit	Latvian Music Recording Awards	Nominated		
2017	"Pastnieks" (lit. 'Postman')	Top Radio Hit	Latvian Music Recording Awards	Nominated		
2017	Tepat (lit. 'Here')	Best Pop Album	Latvian Music Recording Awards	Nominated		
2017	Tepat (lit. 'Here')	Best Album Art	Latvian Music Recording Awards	Won		
2018	"Pa ceļam" (lit. 'Along the Way')	Top Radio Hit	Latvian Music Recording Awards	Won		
2018	"Pa ceļam" (lit. 'Along the Way')	Alfa's Song of the Year	Latvian Music Recording Awards	Nominated		
2018	"Pa ceļam" (lit. 'Along the Way')	Best Song	Latvian Music Recording Awards	Nominated		
2018	Tepat (lit. 'Here')	Best Concert Video	Latvian Music Recording Awards	Won		
2019	"Salauzta Sirds" (lit. 'A Broken Heart') (featuring Ozols)	Top Radio Hit	Latvian Music Recording Awards	Won		
2019	"Salauzta Sirds" (lit. 'A Broken Heart') (featuring Ozols)	Song of the Year	Latvian Music Recording Awards	Nominated		
2019	"Salauzta Sirds" (lit. 'A Broken Heart') (featuring Ozols)	Best Song	Latvian Music Recording Awards	Won		
2019	Namiņš. Kaste. Vārdi (lit. 'Cottage. Box. Names')	Best Pop Album	Latvian Music Recording Awards	Nominated		
2019	"Es Nāktu Mājās" (lit. 'I Would Come Home')	Song of the Year	Muzikālās Banka (lit. 'Musical Bank')	Won		
2020	"Es Nāktu Mājās" (lit. 'I Would Come Home')	Best Video	Latvian Music Recording Awards	Won		
2020	"Es Nāktu Mājās" (lit. 'I Would Come Home')	Song of the Year	Latvian Music Recording Awards	Nominated		
2020	"Es Nāktu Mājās" (lit. 'I Would Come Home')	Best Song	Latvian Music Recording Awards	Nominated		
2020	"Tūrists" (lit. 'Tourists')	Song of the Year	Muzikālās Banka (lit. 'Musical Bank')	Nominated		
2021	Tūrists (lit. 'Tourists')	Best Pop Album	Latvian Music Recording Awards	Won		
2021	"Tūrists" (lit. 'Tourists')	Elektrum Song of the Year	Latvian Music Recording Awards	Nominated		
2021	"Ilgoties man nesanāk" (lit. 'I Can't Wait')	Top Radio Hit	Latvian Music Recording Awards	Nominated		
2021	"Tas rakstīts debesīs (Piena ceļš)" (lit. 'It's Written in the Heavens (Milky Way)')	Song of the Year	Muzikālās Banka (lit. 'Musical Bank')	Nominated		
2021	"Piedošana" (lit. 'Forgiveness')	Song of the Year	Muzikālās Banka (lit. 'Musical Bank')	Nominated	_{Collaboration with Intars Busulis and Prāta Vētra}	
2022	"Tas rakstīts debesīs (Piena ceļš)" (lit. 'It's Written in the Heavens (Milky Way)')	Song of the Year	Latvian Music Recording Awards	Nominated		
2022	"Tas rakstīts debesīs (Piena ceļš)" (lit. 'It's Written in the Heavens (Milky Way)')	ELVI Song of the Year	Latvian Music Recording Awards	Nominated		
2022	"Tas rakstīts debesīs (Piena ceļš)" (lit. 'It's Written in the Heavens (Milky Way)')	Top Radio Hit	Latvian Music Recording Awards	Nominated		
2022	"Tavs pieskāriens" (lit. 'Your touch')	Song of the Year	Muzikālās Banka (lit. 'Musical Bank')	Nominated		
2023	"Tavs pieskāriens" (lit. 'Your touch')	Song of the Year	Latvian Music Recording Awards	Won		
2023	"Tavs pieskāriens" (lit. 'Your touch')	ELVI Song of the Year	Latvian Music Recording Awards	Nominated		
2023	"Tavs pieskāriens" (lit. 'Your touch')	Best Video	Latvian Music Recording Awards	Nominated		
2023	"Tavs pieskāriens" (lit. 'Your touch')	Top Radio Hit	Latvian Music Recording Awards	Won		
2023	"Brīnišķīga diena" (lit. 'Wonderful Day')	Top Radio Hit	Latvian Music Recording Awards	Nominated	_{Collaboration with rolands če}	
2023	"Lauzto šķēpu karaļvalsts" (lit. 'Kingdom of Broken Spears')	Song of the Year	Muzikālās Banka (lit. 'Musical Bank')	Won		
2024	"Divatā" (lit. 'In Two')	ELVI Song of the Year	Latvian Music Recording Awards	Nominated		
2024	"Divatā" (lit. 'In Two')	Top Radio Hit	Latvian Music Recording Awards	Won		
2024	"Lauzto šķēpu karaļvalsts" (lit. 'Kingdom of Broken Spears')	Best Video	Latvian Music Recording Awards	Nominated		
2024	Himself	Total Slay	Eurovision Awards	Nominated		
2024	"Bultiņa melnā" (lit. 'Black Arrow')	Song of the Year	Muzikālās Banka (lit. 'Musical Bank')	7th place		
2024	Himself	Male Solo Artist of the Year	GAMMA awards	Won		
2024	Himself	Pop Artist of the Year	GAMMA awards	Nominated		
2024	"Hollow"	Hit of the Year	GAMMA awards	Won		
2024	"Hollow"	Most Streamed Song of the Year	GAMMA awards	Nominated		
2024	Laiks Concert (Daugava Stadium)	Musical Event of the Year	GAMMA awards	Nominated		
2024	Laiks Concert (Daugava Stadium)	Live Performance/Concert of the Year	GAMMA awards	Nominated		
2025	"Tuvums" (lit. 'Closeness')	Song of the Year	Muzikālās Banka (lit. 'Musical Bank')	Won		

Awards and achievements
Preceded by Sudden Lights with "Aijā"	Latvia in the Eurovision Song Contest; 2024	Succeeded by Tautumeitas with "Bur man laimi"
