= Sudden Lights =

Latvian band

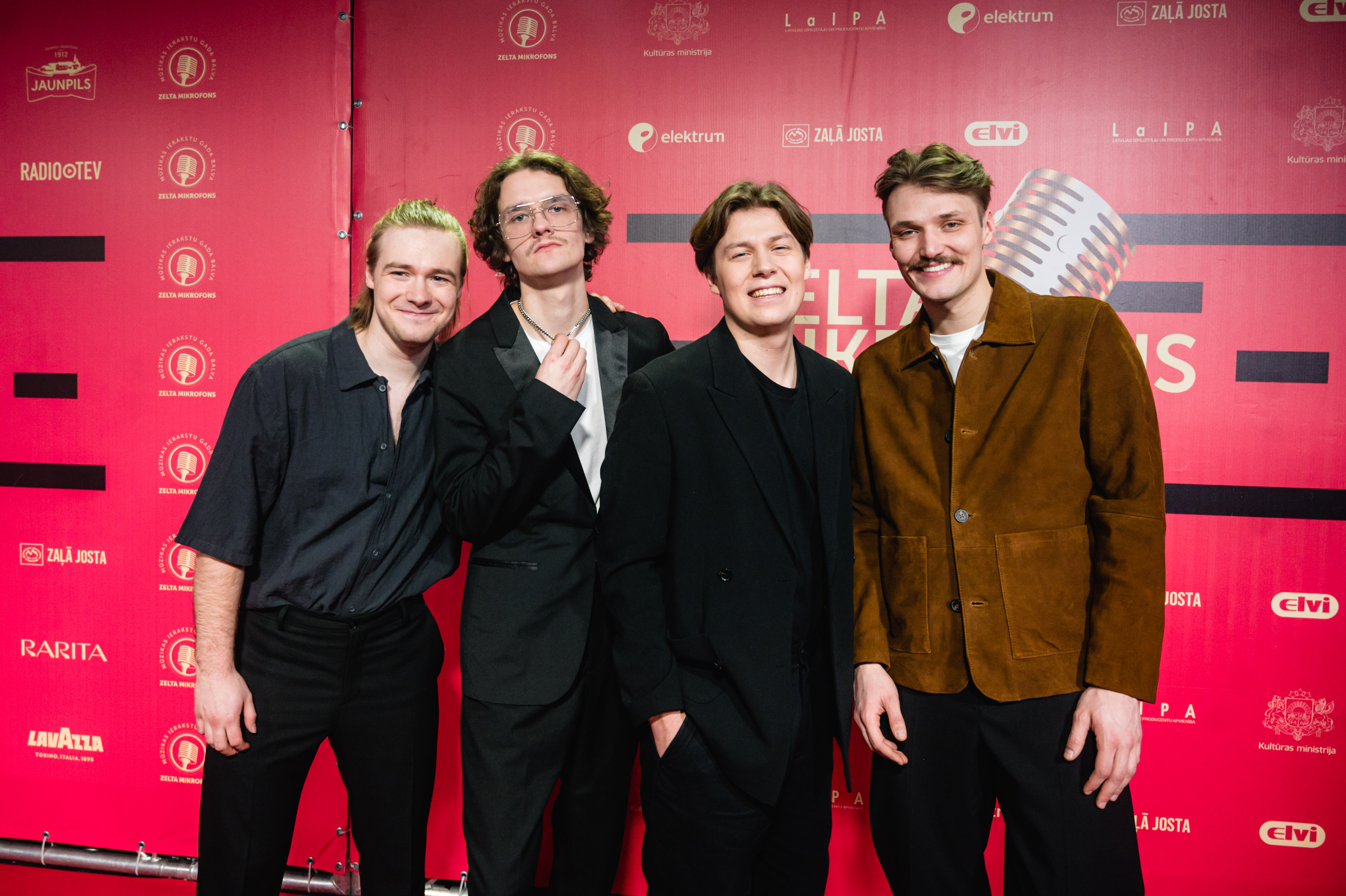
- Sudden Lights in 2023

Background information
- Origin: Riga, Latvia
- Genres: Alternative rock; Indie rock; Pop rock
- Years active: 2012–present
- Members: Andrejs Reinis Zitmanis; Kārlis Matīss Zitmanis; Mārtiņš Matīss Zemītis; Kārlis Vārtiņš
- Website: suddenlights.lv

Sudden Lights are a Latvian indie rock band, founded in 2012 in Riga. The band consists of vocalist Andrejs Reinis Zitmanis, drummer Mārtiņš Matīss Zemītis, guitarist Kārlis Matīss Zitmanis, and bassist Kārlis Vārtiņš. In February 2023, the group won Supernova 2023 with the song "Aijā" and represented Latvia in the Eurovision Song Contest 2023.

== History ==
The group was founded in 2012 by Andrejs Reinis Zitmanis and Mārtiņš Matīss Zemītis when they were both studying at the Pāvuls Jurjāns Music School in Riga. They were joined by Kārlis Matīss Zitmanis and Kārlis Vārtiņš. In 2015, they won the upcoming musician competition First Record (Latvian: Pirmā plate) at Riga State Gymnasium No.1. The top prize was the opportunity to record a song. The band used it to record their first single, "Tik Savādi". Their later creative efforts culminated in a debut album, preceded by the singles "Priekšpilsētas valsis", "Laikmets" and "Šajā sētas pusē", which were immediately given air time by Latvian radio stations.

=== Priekšpilsētas (2017) ===
On September 22, 2017, Sudden Lights presented their debut album Priekšpilsētas (Suburbs), comprising 10 songs in Latvian and English. The band's first self-organized concert, in which they performed songs from the album, took place at the Daile Music House in Riga on April 12, 2018. The band was joined on stage by Latvian musician Tīna Šipkēvica. The album brought the band a Golden Microphone 2018 nomination for Best Debut.

LTV Supernova 2018

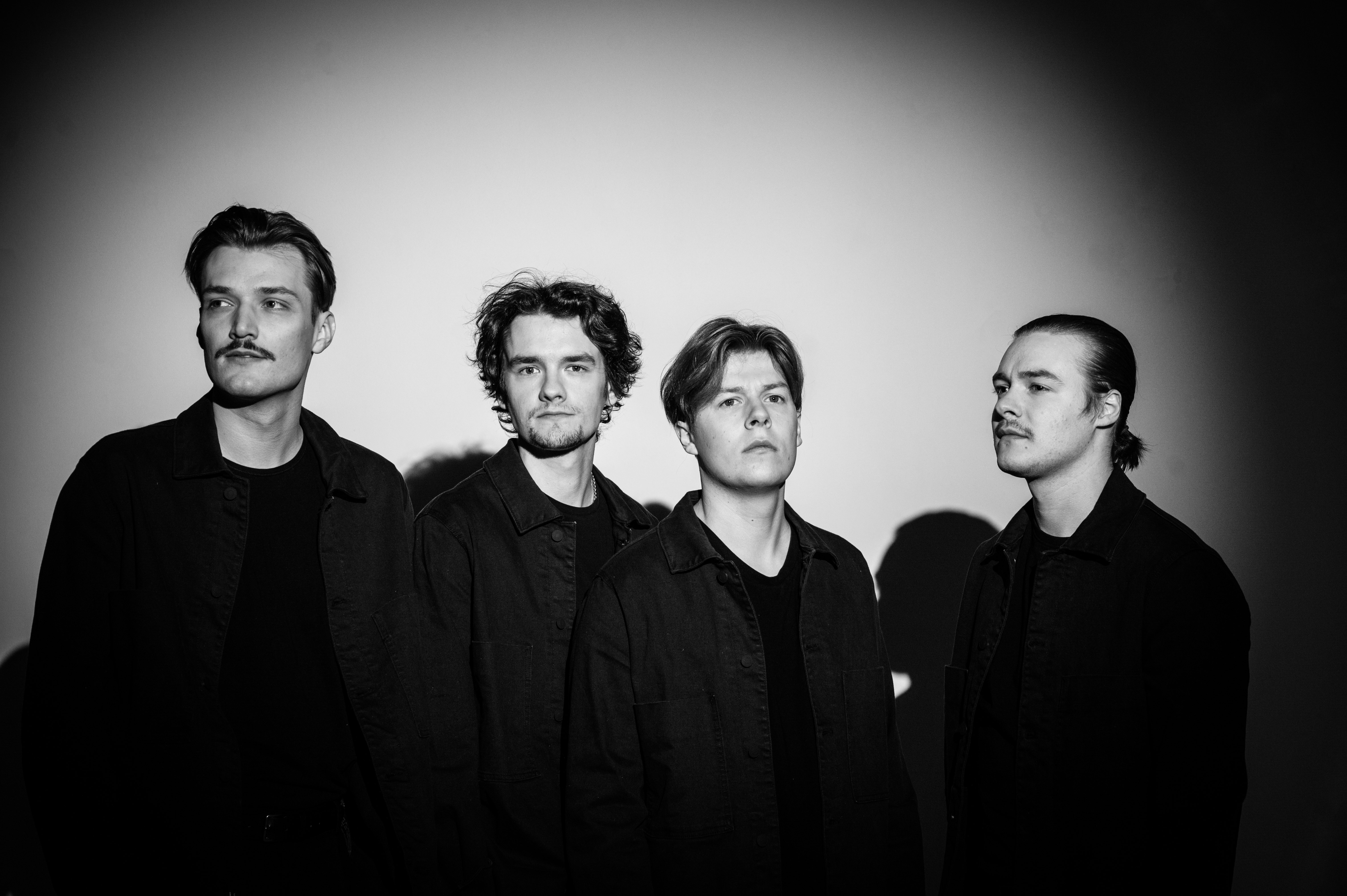
Sudden Lights in 2022

The band took part in Supernova 2018, Latvia's national selection competition for the Eurovision Song Contest 2018, with their song "Just Fine", the closing track of their debut album, and placed second.

Initially, the group failed to qualify for the semi-finals, but the LTV jury chose them as a wild card qualifier. The group then performed in the final and finished in 2nd place.

Brainstorm Tin Drum Tour

While presenting the album About the Boy Who Plays the Tin Drum (Latvian: Par to zēnu, kas sit skārda bungas) on a concert tour, Latvian pop-rock band Brainstorm announced that Sudden Lights would accompany them on their Latvian tour as the support act for all five concerts. 60,000 people attended the closing concert of the tour at the Mežaparks Open-Air Scene in Riga.

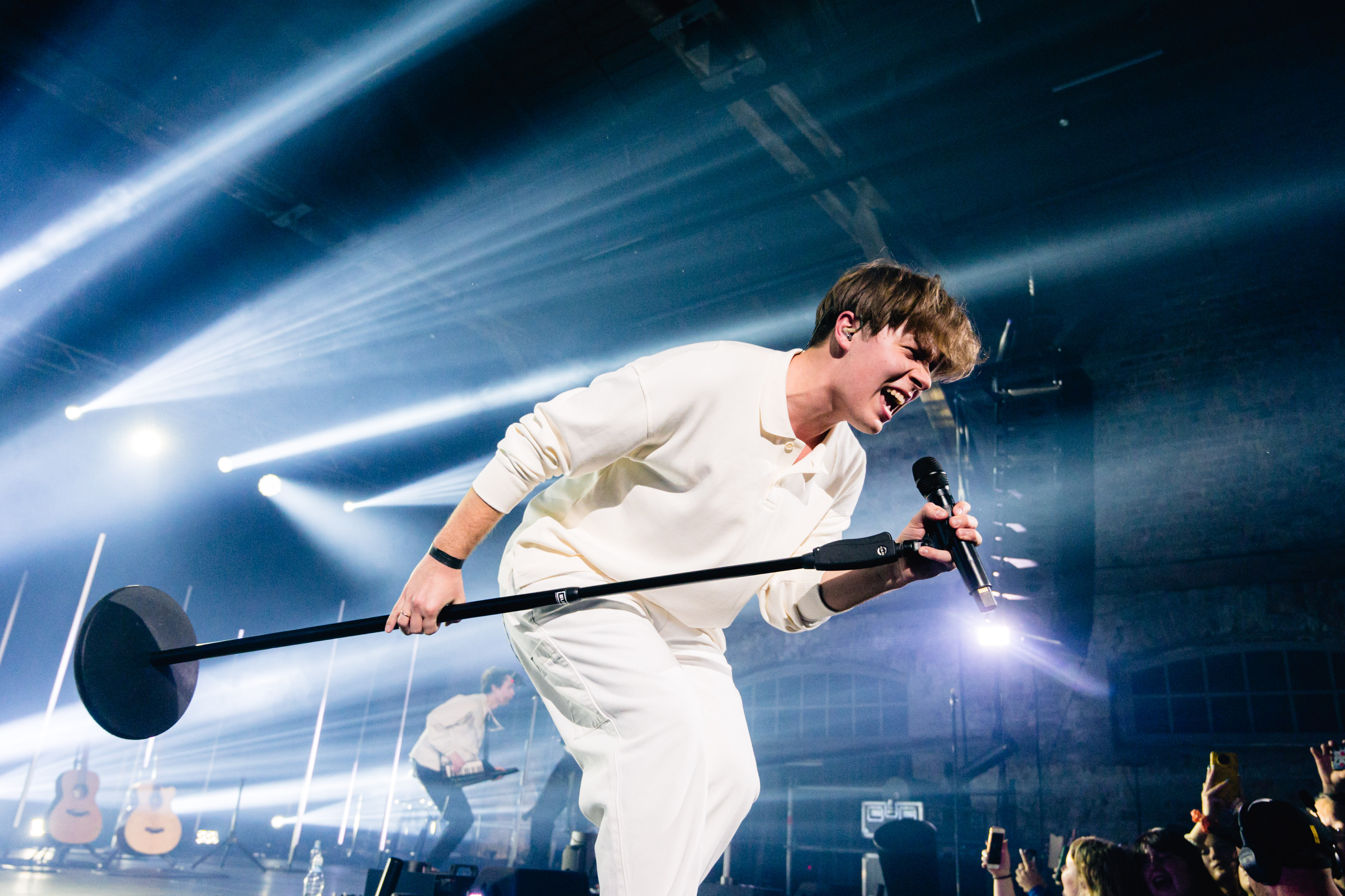
Andrejs Reinis Zitmanis of Sudden Lights performing at Hanzas Perons Show in 2022

Second studio tour and concert tour

After releasing the singles "Negribu piezemēties" and "Dzīvnieks", the band announced their second album Vislabāk ir tur, kur manis nav (The Best Place is Where I'm Not Around). The album was released on October 11, 2019. The album was produced by Jānis Aišpurs, with whom the band had already collaborated on several singles. In late February 2020, the group began their first concert tour in Latvia. They performed in Valmiera, Liepāja, and Alūksne before the COVID-19 pandemic forced them to cancel the closing concert scheduled for March 20 in Riga.

Third studio album and collaborations

The band's 2020 collaboration with Astro'n'out, the song "Haosā", won the Golden Microphone 2021 Award as Radio Hit of the Year. In January 2021, the band started work on their third studio album together with producer Jānis Aišpurus. The first single of the album was "Klusumi", which was released in April 2021. Outside of writing the album, on which the band collaborated with the singer Annna remotely via Zoom, the song and radio single "Aizņem man vietu" was recorded. In August 2021, the next single of the forthcoming album single "Siltas vasaras ēnā" was released. This was followed on February 25, 2022 by the release of the single "Laternas".

The band's third studio album "Miljards vasaru" (A Billion Summers) was presented on May 13, 2022 in the Small Hall at Splendid Palace, with the band giving a small concert and presenting a documentary film about the production of the album. The album was nominated for the Latvian record award Zelta Mikrofons 2023 as best pop album. The concert recording and album's design were also nominated, and two songs were nominated for the People's Choice award.

Parallel to the release of the album, the single "Pāris neuzņemtu foto" was released. In the summer of 2022, the song "Pasaule trīc", a collaboration between Sudden Lights and ZEBRENE, was released. In the summer, Sudden Lights performed at the festivals Summer Sound, Positivus, Saldus Saule and Limbizkvīts, Latvijas mūzikas lielkoncerts, as well as at festivals in Jekabpils, Ventspils, Sigulda, Aizskraukle, Madona, Daugavpils and other cities.

In the autumn of 2022, the band worked on its plan for a tour of Latvia, attracting the rapper ZEĻĢIS as a special concert guest. "Jasmīns", a song jointly performed by Sudden Lights and ZEĻĢIS was also recorded during this period. The "Miljards vasaru" tour took place with concerts on 17 September in Jelgava (at the Melno Cepurīšu Balerija), September 23 in Valmiera (at the Valmiera Concert Hall), on September 24 in Liepaja (at the Wiktorija Culture Centre), and on October 8 at Hanzas Perons in Riga. The final concert of the tour at Hanzas Perons in Riga was also filmed as a concert video, “Sudden Lights koncerttūres "Miljards vasaru" noslēguma koncerts”.

=== 2023 ===
In 2023, the group placed second with the single "Laternas" in the Latvijas Radio 2 song contest Muzikālā Banka.

Sudden Lights participated in the Supernova 2023 contest organized by Latvian Television with the song "Aijā". The group won the competition and thereby gained the right to represent Latvia in the Eurovision Song Contest 2023. The band went on a promo tour and performed at Moldova's Etapa Naţională 2023 followed by a performance at the Barcelona Eurovision Party and concerts in Tel Aviv, Amsterdam and Madrid. Latvian DJ [Ex] da Bass and Makree each released a remix of "Aijā".

They performed fourth in the first semi-final on May 9, but did not qualify to the grand final.

On September 16, 2023, "Sudden Lights" performed an open-air concert at the Mežaparks Green Theater, which at that time was the band’s largest solo concert. On November 29, at Forum Cinemas in Riga, the band premiered a concert film featuring 13 songs from all three of their albums, performed at the Mežaparks Green Theater. Alongside the songs, the film also includes personal vignettes of the band members, created by director Uģis Olte. The live recording from the Mežaparks Green Theater was also released on streaming platforms and in vinyl format.

=== 2024 ===
On March 8, 2024, at the Latvian Music Recording Awards "Zelta Mikrofons 2024", the band "Sudden Lights" received two awards. In the category Best Concert Recording, the Mežaparks Green Theater concert film was awarded, while in the category Most Streamed Recording, the award went to the song "Aijā".

In March 2024, the band performed in Lithuania — in Vilnius and Palanga — and also took part in Tallinn Music Week in Tallinn, Estonia. They released an English-language song, "Eastern European Dream," dedicated to the youth of the Baltic States.

In 2024, the band released two singles — in June, the song "Nejauši kadri" ("Accidental Frames"), and in November, the song "Eldorado", both serving as preludes to their forthcoming fourth studio album. The music videos are part of an album music video short film, created under the direction of award-winning director Matīss Kaža, with various next-generation directors contributing. Each director is entrusted with the creation of the video for a specific single. In November 2024, Sudden Lights announced a solo arena concert at Arēna Rīga.

=== 2025–2026 ===
In February 2025, the third single from the upcoming studio album, "Lai tev apnīk skumt" ("So You Get Tired of Being Sad"), was released. On May 22, 2025, Sudden Lights released their fourth studio album, "Īsas vasaras, garas ziemas" ("Short Summers, Long Winters"). The album presentation took place on May 21 at the Splendid Palace cinema in Riga, featuring both the music video short film and live performances of the new album's songs. Album received two recording industry awards "Zelta Mikrofons" as the album of year 2025 as well as the best pop album. Band's work in year 2025 received also three GAMMA awards in the categories: best band, pop artist of the year and best concert.

On November 15, 2025, Sudden Lights held their biggest concert to date — a sold-out arena show in Xiaomi arena Riga attended by more than 10,000 listeners. On March 20, 2026, the band premieres the concert film “Sudden Lights in the Arena” directed by Andrejs Reinis Zitmanis, Aleksandrs Okonovs and Kārlis Zemītis.

== Discography ==
=== Studio albums ===
| Title | Album details | Peak chart position | |
| Title | Album details | LAT | LAT Dom. |
|---|---|---|---|
| Priekšpilsētas | Released: 22 September 2017; Label: Self-published; Formats: CD, Digital download, streaming | * | |
| Vislabāk ir tur, kur manis nav | Released: 11 October 2019; Label: Self-published; Formats: CD, Digital download, streaming | — | * |
| Miljards vasaru | Released: 13 May 2022; Label: Self-published; Formats: CD, LP, Digital download, streaming | 5 | 2 |
| Īsas vasaras, garas ziemas | Release date: 22 May 2025; Label: Self-published | * | |
"—" denotes items which were not released in that country or failed to chart. "*" denotes that the chart did not exist at that time.

=== Singles ===
List of singles, with selected chart positions
| Title | Year | Peak chart positions | | | | | Certifications | Album |
| Title | Year | LAT Air. | LAT Dom. Air. | LAT Stream. | LAT Dom. Stream. | EST Air. | Certifications | Album |
|---|---|---|---|---|---|---|---|---|
| "Tik savādi" | 2015 | * | * | — | * | * | | Priekšpilsētas |
| "Priekšpilsētas valsis" | 2016 | — | * | — | * | — | | Priekšpilsētas |
| "Laikmets" | 2017 | — | * | — | * | — | | Priekšpilsētas |
| "Šajā sētas pusē" | 2017 | — | * | — | * | — | | Priekšpilsētas |
| "Negribu piezemēties" | 2018 | — | * | — | * | — | | Vislabāk ir tur, kur manis nav |
| "Dzīvnieks" | 2019 | — | * | — | * | — | | Vislabāk ir tur, kur manis nav |
| "Izbēgšana" | 2019 | — | * | — | * | — | | Vislabāk ir tur, kur manis nav |
| "Gaisma" | 2019 | — | * | — | * | — | | Non-album singles |
| "Haosā" (featuring Astro'n'out) | 2020 | — | * | * | * | — | | Non-album singles |
| "Elektriskā gaisma" | 2020 | — | * | * | * | — | | Miljards vasaru |
| "Klusumi" | 2021 | — | * | * | * | — | | Miljards vasaru |
| "Aizņem man vietu" (featuring Annna) | 2021 | — | * | * | * | — | | Non-album single |
| "Siltas vasaras ēnā" | 2021 | — | * | * | * | — | | Miljards vasaru |
| "Laternas" | 2022 | — | * | * | * | — | LaIPA: Gold | Miljards vasaru |
| "Pasaule trīc" (with ZeBrene) | 2022 | — | * | * | * | — | | Non-album singles |
| "Jasmīns" (featuring Zeļģis) | 2022 | — | * | * | * | — | | Non-album singles |
| "Aijā" | 2023 | — | 3 | 3 | 2 | — | LaIPA: 2× Platinum | Non-album singles |
| "Backwards in Time" | 2023 | — | — | — | — | — | | Non-album singles |
| "Mēs turpināmies" | 2023 | 7 | 1 | — | — | — | | Īsas vasaras, garas ziemas |
| "Mūsu mīlestība" | 2023 | — | — | 6 | 2 | — | LaIPA: Gold | Non-album singles |
| "Adata un diegs" (with Gustavo) | 2023 | 19 | 1 | — | — | — | | Non-album singles |
| "Ataust rīts" (with Aminata) | 2024 | — | 4 | — | — | — | | Non-album singles |
| "Eastern European Dream" | 2024 | — | — | — | — | — | | Non-album singles |
| "Nejauši kadri" | 2024 | — | 7 | — | — | — | | Īsas vasaras, garas ziemas |
| "Eldorado" | 2024 | 5 | 1 | — | — | — | | Īsas vasaras, garas ziemas |
| "Lai tev apnīk skumt" | 2025 | 6 | 1 | 18 | 6 | — | | Īsas vasaras, garas ziemas |
| "Ātri lēni" | 2025 | — | 6 | — | — | — | | Īsas vasaras, garas ziemas |
| "Saules dienas" | 2025 | — | 9 | — | — | — | | Īsas vasaras, garas ziemas |
| "My Melancholic Baby" | 2025 | — | — | — | — | — | | Non-album singles |
| "It Drives Me (Out of My Mind)" (with Noëp) | 2026 | 17 | 2 | 41 | 7 | 62 | | Non-album singles |
"—" denotes items which were not released in that country or failed to chart. "*" denotes that the chart did not exist at that time.

=== Other charted songs ===
List of other songs, with selected chart positions
| Title | Year | Peak chart positions | | Album |
| Title | Year | LAT Air. | LAT Dom. Air. | Album |
|---|---|---|---|---|
| "Septiņdesmito pludmales" | 2025 | 15 | 3 | Īsas vasaras, garas ziemas |

== Awards and nominations ==
| Award | Year | Nominee(s) | Category | Result | Ref. |
|---|---|---|---|---|---|
| Annual Latvian Music Recording Awards | 2018 | "Priekšpilsētas" | Best Debut | Nominated | |
| Annual Latvian Music Recording Awards | 2021 | "Elektriskā gaisma" | Elektrum Song of the Year | Nominated | |
| Annual Latvian Music Recording Awards | 2021 | "Haosā" (with Astro'n'out) | Radio Hits | Won | |
| Annual Latvian Music Recording Awards | 2022 | "Aizņem man vietu" | ELVI Song of the Year | Nominated | |
| Muzikālā Banka | 2022 | "Laternas" | Song of the Year | 2nd place | |
| Annual Latvian Music Recording Awards | 2023 | "Sudden Lights koncerttūres "Miljards vasaru" noslēguma koncerts" | Best Concert Video | Nominated | |
| Annual Latvian Music Recording Awards | 2023 | "Miljards vasaru" (design by artist Roberts Mikus Zitmanis, layout designer Viktorija Kaparkalėja) | Best Album Design | Nominated | |
| Annual Latvian Music Recording Awards | 2023 | "Laternas" | ELVI Song of the Year | Nominated | |
| Annual Latvian Music Recording Awards | 2023 | "Pasaule trīc" (with ZeBrene) | ELVI Song of the Year | Nominated | |
| Annual Latvian Music Recording Awards | 2023 | "Miljards vasaru" | Best Pop Album | Nominated | |
| Muzikālā Banka | 2023 | "Mēs turpināmies" | Song of the Year | 2nd place | |
| Annual Latvian Music Recording Awards | 2024 | "Sudden Lights Mežaparka Zaļajā teātrī. Koncertfilma" | Best Concert Video | Won | |
| Annual Latvian Music Recording Awards | 2024 | "Adata un diegs" (with Gustavo) | ELVI Song of the Year | Nominated | |
| Annual Latvian Music Recording Awards | 2024 | "Aijā" | Elektrum Most Streamed Record | Won | |
| Muzikālā Banka | 2025 | "Lai tev apnīk skumt" | Song of the Year | 2nd place | |
| Annual Latvian Music Recording Awards | 2026 | "īsas vasaras, garas ziemas" | Album of the Year | Won | |
| | | "īsas vasaras, garas ziemas" | Best Pop Album | Won | |
| Latvian Broadcasting Media award Kilograms kultūras | 2026 | "Sudden Lights", XIAOMI Arēna, 15.11.2025 | Pop culture | Nominated | |
| Muzikālā banka | 2026 | "Lai tev apnīk skumt" | Song of the Year | 2nd place | |
| Latvian music industry award GAMMA | 2026 | Band of the Year | | Won | |
| | | Pop Artist of the Year | | Won | |
| | | "Sudden Lights", XIAOMI Arēna, 15.11.2025 | Best Live Concert | Won | |
| | | "Lai tev apnīk skumt" | Hit of the Year | Nominated | |

Awards and achievements
| Preceded by Citi Zēni with "Eat Your Salad" | Latvia in the Eurovision Song Contest; 2023 | Succeeded by Dons with "Hollow" |
