= Online (disambiguation) =

In computer technology and telecommunications, the term online refers to a state of having connectivity.

Online may also refer to:

== Arts, entertainment, and media ==
=== Films ===
- On Line (2002 film), American drama film
- On Line (2015 film), Chinese science fiction action film

=== Music ===
- Online (album), a 2001 album by the Latvian rock band Brainstorm
  - "Online" (Brainstorm song)
- "Online" (Brad Paisley song), 2007 song recorded by American country music artist Brad Paisley
- "Online", a 2006 song by Gnarls Barkley from St. Elsewhere

=== Periodicals ===
- Online (magazine), magazine for information systems first published in 1977

== Computing and technology ==
- .online, a generic top-level domain
- Online algorithm, an algorithm which doesn't require the whole input from the start
- Online analytical processing, an approach to answer multi-dimensional analytical (MDA) queries swiftly
- Online machine learning, a method of machine learning in which data becomes available in a sequential order
- Online SAS, French cloud computing and hosting company

== Other uses ==
- One Nevada Transmission Line (ONLine), proposed electrical power line in Nevada

== See also ==
- Offline (disambiguation)
- Online storage (disambiguation)
