= O line =

O line or O-line may refer to:

- Tseung Kwan O line, an MTR line in Hong Kong
- Norfolk Southern O-Line, a freight rail line in North Carolina, United States
- O-line (IRCd), the operator line of an IRC daemon configuration file
- O-line, or offensive line, a formation in North American football

== See also ==
- O-Train, a light rail rapid transit system in Ottawa, Ontario, Canada
- Orange Line (disambiguation)
- Online (disambiguation)
