= Weekends Are Not My Happy Days =

Single by Brainstorm

from the album Among the Suns
- B-side: Instrumental; The Winter
- Released: May 1999
- Recorded: 1998–99, Puk Recording Studios
- Genre: Pop rock, alternative rock
- Length: 3:33 (Single version); 4:02 (Album version)
- Label: Microphone, EMI
- Songwriter(s): Renārs Kaupers, Rolands Udris
- Producer(s): Lars Nissen, Reynard Cowper

Brainstorm singles chronology
"Half of Your Heart" (1998)	"Weekends Are Not My Happy Days" (1999)	"Under My Wing" (1999 re-release)

"Weekends Are Not My Happy Days" is an English-language single by Latvian pop rock band Brainstorm.

It is the first track on their 1999 debut English album, Among the Suns, which was released in May 1999. The song peaked at #13 in Belgium.

== Track listing ==
1. "Weekends Are Not My Happy Days" - 3:33
2. "Weekends Are Not My Happy Days" (Instrumental) - 4:02
3. "Weekends Are Not My Happy Days" (album version) - 4:02
4. "The Winter" - 2:49

== Credits ==
- Reynard Cowper - writer, producer
- Lars Nissen - arranger, mixer
