= Maybe (Brainstorm song) =

Single by Brainstorm

from the album Online
- B-side: "Instrumental"; "Remixes"
- Released: 13 August 2001
- Recorded: 2001
- Studio: Ridge Farm, England
- Genre: Alternative rock; worldbeat; pop rock (original version); House; Eurodance (remix)
- Length: 3:59 (single version); 4:12 (album version)
- Label: Microphone; EMI
- Songwriters: Renārs Kaupers; Ojars Kalnins
- Producer: Tony Mansfield

Brainstorm singles chronology
"My Star" (2000)	"Maybe" (2001)	"Online" (2001)

"Maybe" is a song by the Latvian pop rock group Brainstorm, written by the band's lead singer Renārs Kaupers and Ojārs Kalniņš on track three only. It was released as the second single taken from their second English-language studio album Online on 13 August 2001. It became a hit single in Poland entered at #1 and number eight in Greece. The song was produced by Tony Mansfield of New Musik.

== Music video ==
The music video was filmed in Prague, Czech Republic.

== Track listing ==
- CD Single
1. "Maybe" (Radio Edit) - 3:59
2. "Maybe" (Album Edit) - 4:08
3. "Maybe" (Instrumental) - 4:14
- CD maxi single
1. "Maybe" (radio edit)
2. "Maybe" (extended version)
3. "Hearts Desire" - 4:17
- 12-inch single
1. "Maybe" (BTH extended remix) - 5:56
2. "Maybe" (Braithouse Radio Remix) - 4:06
3. "Maybe" (Boyza Fishbone Extended Remix) - 4:00
4. "Maybe" (Boyza Fishbone Radio Remix) - 3:13
- CD remix single
1. "Maybe" (Braithouse radio remix)- 4:05
2. "Maybe" (Braithouse Extended)- 5:55
3. "Maybe" (Boyza Fishbone extended remix) - 3:12
4. "Maybe" (Boyza radio) - 3:58

== Charts ==
Chart (2001)	Peak position
Greece	8
Poland	1
