= Wonderful Day =

Wonderful Day may refer to:

- Wonderful Day (film) or I've Gotta Horse, a 1965 British film starring Billy Fury
- Wonderful Day (album) or the title song, Russian version of About the Boy Who Plays the Tin Drum by Brainstorm, 2018
- "Wonderful Day", a song by Alvin and the Chipmunks from Christmas with The Chipmunks, 1962
- "Wonderful Day", a song by the Other Half, 1967

== See also ==
- The Wonderful Day (disambiguation)
- Wonderful Days (disambiguation)
