= Madara Mālmane =

Latvian model

- Born: 1989 (age 35–36); Riga, Latvia
- Modeling information
- Height: 1.70 m (5 ft 7 in)
- Hair color: Blonde
- Eye color: Blue
- Agency: Gints Bude Model Management Riga; IMG London; IMG Paris; Brave Milan

Madara Mālmane (born 1989) is a Latvian model.

She has been on the cover of Italian magazine Grazia in 2003 and 2005. Mālmane has photos taken for magazines L'Officiel, Vogue, Elle, Marie Claire, Numéro, W, Vanity Fair, and Jalouse. She graduated Rīgas Hanzas vidusskola. She is currently in a relationship with Latvian singer Dons.
