= Offline (disambiguation) =

In computer technology and telecommunications, the term offline refers to a lack of connectivity.

Offline may also refer to:

- OfflineTV, an online social entertainment group of content creators based in Los Angeles, California
- Offline (album), a 2014 album by Guano Apes
- Cyberstalker (film), a 2012 Canadian film also known as Offline
- Unfriended, a 2014 film whose working title was Offline
- LP!, an album by JPEGMafia also titled OFFLINE! on some editions

== See also ==
- Airplane mode
- Online (disambiguation)
