= Online (Brainstorm song) =

Single by Brainstorm

from the album Online
- Released: 2001
- Genre: Rock
- Length: 4:34
- Label: Microphone

Brainstorm singles chronology
"Maybe" (2001)	"Online" (2001)	"Waterfall" (2001)

"Online" is a song by the Latvian rock group Brainstorm. The single appeared on the band's second international studio album Online (album) was released in 2001.

== Track listing ==
1. "Online" (radio edit)
2. "Online" (extended version)
3. "Visskumjākā parāde uz mūzu ielas" (live acoustic)
