= Ozols (rapper) =

Latvian rapper

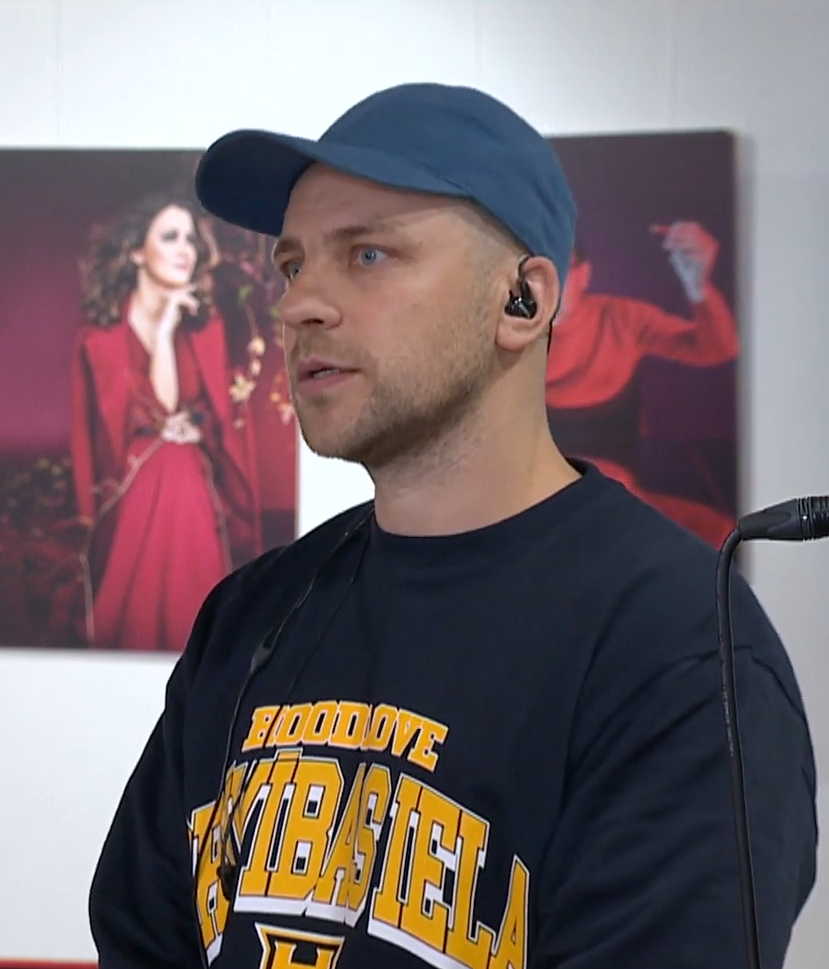
- Ozols in April 2023

Background information
- Also known as: Ozols
- Born: Ģirts Rozentāls; July 21, 1979 (age 47); Riga, Latvian SSR
- Origin: Rīga
- Genres: Hip hop
- Occupations: rapper; writer; record producer; entrepreneur
- Instrument: Vocals
- Years active: 1995–present

Ģirts Rozentāls (born July 21, 1979), better known by his stage name Ozols (in Latvian – oak) is a Latvian rapper, writer, record producer and entrepreneur from Riga. His musical career began in 1995, with the first hip hop group in Latvia called FACT.

== Music career ==
Ozols is regarded as one of the founders of hip hop music in Latvia in the mid-1990s. After spending six years in a hip hop group called FACT where he wrote songs together with Gustavo and Čižiks, he started his solo career at the beginning of the 2000s with his debut single "Neko 2005" (2000), followed by his debut album Cieņa un mīlestība (2001; Respect and Love). His appearance using shiny accessories, baggy clothes, and a "gangster image" was a shock to local musicians and listeners at the time. In 2009 Platforma Music label released Ozols' 19-track album Neatkarība (Independence) featuring Nātre, Rays, Kurts, Pikaso, A.G., b-ūš and New York rapper Afu-ra.

In 2015, after a few years of silence, Ozols returned to the Latvian music scene with his fifth studio album Atpakaļ nākotnē (Back to the Future).

On November 12, 2018, Ozols released his sixth studio album Neona pilsēta (Neon City).

During his career, Ozols has performed in the Latvian Song and Dance Festival, reached the status of the "Golden disc" with the album Cieņa un mīlestība, and received the Latvian Music Records Annual Award four times.

== Business career ==
In 2014, Ozols founded the clothing shop "Hoodshop," which sells clothes, shoes books and vinyl records. Earlier, the musician owned the shop "Street shop."

== Personal life ==
In 2016, he married "Promoart.lv" artist Eva Rozentāle (née Poņemecka). He has a daughter named Naomi from a previous relationship.

== Discography ==
=== Singles ===
- "Neko 2005" (2000)
- "O.Z.O.L.S" (2001)
- "OzRaps/O'79" (2002)
- "Mirāža" (2012)
- "Piemēri" (2013)
- "Sapņotājs" (2013)
- "Ilgojos" (2014)
- "Superhaips" (2015)
- "Situācijas" (ft. Edavārdi) (2016)
- "Laika kapsula" (2016)
- "Pasaule" (ft. Tehnikums) (2017)
- "Personības rekords" (2018)
- "Stils" (2018)
- "Zapte" (2019)
- "Levitē" (2019)

=== Albums ===
- "Cieņa un mīlestība" (2001)
- "Augstāk, tālāk, stiprāk" (2002)
- "Dūzis" (2003)
- "Neatkarība" (2009)
- "Cieņa un mīlestība" (2015)
- "Atpakaļ nākotnē" (2015)
- "Semestris" ft. Tehnikums (2017)
- "Neona Pilsēta" (2018)
- "Yauda" (2020)
- "Sporta Live" (2020)
- "1979" (2023)

== Annual Latvian Music Recording Awards ==
=== Nominations ===
- "Salauzta sirds" ft. Dons (song of the year 2019)
- "Semestris" ft. Tehnikums (best hip hop album 2018)
- "Tu vari tēlot" ft. Tehnikums (best music video 2018)
- "Situācijas" ft. Edavārdi (best music video 2017)
- "Atpakaļ nākotnē" (best music video 2016)

=== Received awards ===
- "Neona pilsētas" (best hip hop album 2019)
- "Salauzta sirds" ft. Dons (best radio hit 2019)
- "Salauzta sirds" ft. Dons (best song 2019)
- "Atpakaļ nākotnē" (best hip hop album 2016)
