= Among the Suns =

1999 album by Brainstorm

Studio album by Brainstorm
- Released: May 1999; 14 July 2000 (reissue)
- Studio: Puk Recording Studios, Kærby, Denmark; EMI Studios, Stockholm, Sweden; Jacobs Studios, Surrey, UK
- Genre: Pop rock, alternative rock
- Length: 46:28 (1999); 49:31 (2000)
- Label: Microphone

Brainstorm chronology
Stārp divām sāulem (1999)	Among the Suns (1999)	Izlase '89–'99 (2000)

Singles from Among the Suns
- 1. "Half of Your Heart" Released: 1998; 2. "Under My Wing" Released: 1999 (re-release); 3. "My Star" Released: May 2000; 4. "Weekends Are Not My Happy Days" Released: July 2000

Among the Suns is the debut English-language studio album by the Latvian pop/rock group Brainstorm, released in May 1999 and reissued in July 2000. It is the English-language version of the Latvian-language album Starp divām saulēm (1999). The album includes the English versions of "Under My Wing" and "Welcome to My Country". It was recorded in Denmark and Sweden and reached number 13 in the charts in Finland, number 42 in Belgium and number 47 in Sweden. On July 14, 2000 the album was reissued which included the song "My Star" which represented Latvia at the Eurovision Song Contest 2000. It sold more than 80,000 copies in Europe

== Track listing ==
All tracks are written by Renārs Kaupers except co-written with Maris Mihelson and Brainstorm.

No.	Title	Length
1.	"Weekends Are Not My Happy Days"	4:02
2.	"Ain't It Funny"	3:35
3.	"Under My Wing"	4:35
4.	"Half of Your Heart"	3:11
5.	"Among the Suns"	3:30
6.	"Try"	4:27
7.	"Downtown"	3:31
8.	"Before the Time Has Come to Leave You"	5:17
9.	"Stars"	3:36
10.	"Welcome to My Country"	4:16
11.	"These Women Drive Me Crazy"	2:52
12.	"All Right, Chill Out"	3:35
Total length:		46:28

2000 Reissue
No.	Title	Writer(s)	Length
1.	"My Star"	Brainstorm	3:03
2.	"Weekends Are Not My Happy Days"		4:02
3.	"Aint It Funny"		3:35
4.	"Under My Wing"		4:35
5.	"Half of Your Heart"		3:11
6.	"Among the Suns"		3:30
7.	"Try"		4:27
8.	"Downtown"		3:31
9.	"Before the Time Has Come To Leave You"		5:17
10.	"Stars"		3:36
11.	"Welcome to My Country"		4:16
12.	"These Women Drive Me Crazy"		2:52
13.	"All Right, Chill Out"		3:35
Total length:			49:31

== Personnel ==
- Renārs Kaupers – vocals, guitar
- Jānis Jubalts – guitar
- Māris Mihelsons – keyboards, accordion
- Kaspars Roga – drums
- Gundars Mauševics – bass

== Charts ==
Chart (2000)	Peak position
Finnish Albums (Suomen virallinen lista)	13
Belgian Albums (Ultratop Flanders)	42
Swedish Albums (Sverigetopplistan)	47

Singles

Year	Single	Chart	
2000	"My Star"	Swedish Singles Chart	22
2000	Weekends Are Not My Happy Days	Belgian Singles Chart	13

== Sales ==
Sales for Among the Suns
Region	Certification	Certified units/sales
Latvia	—	25,000
Russia	—	13,000

== Release history ==
Country	Date
Europe	May 1999
