= Wonderful Days =

Wonderful Days may refer to:

- Wonderful Days (film) or Sky Blue, a 2003 South Korean animated film
- Wonderful Days (TV series), a 2014 South Korean drama
- "Wonderful Days", a 1994 song by Charly Lownoise and Mental Theo

== See also ==
- Wonderful Day (disambiguation)
- The Wonderful Day (disambiguation)
