= Gustavs Butelis =

Latvian rapper

Gustavo
- Birth name: Gustavs Butelis
- Born: 19 June 1978 (age 46); Riga, Latvian SSR
- Origin: Riga
- Genres: Hip hop
- Occupation(s): Rapper, record producer, songwriter
- Years active: 1995–present
- Labels: Microphone, Gailītis G

Arstarulsmirus Arsujumfus Tarus (born as Gustavs Butelis, June 19, 1978) better known by his stage name Gustavo is a Latvian rapper and producer. He's released 6 albums, and received multiple awards for his songs and albums.

== Biography ==
Butelis was interested in music since he was young, when he wanted to play drums or guitar, but his father convinced him to take up saxophone. He was interested in many music genres, at one point especially metal music, his current interest in hip-hop started at age of 15. He began work on his musical career in 1995 at age of 18, when with his friends he started a band Fact. Butelis was lead in the band and took music work very seriously. His solo career as Gustavo began after Fact disbanded.

In 2002, after more than two years hiatus, he released his first single Jau-tā-jums, but his debut album Beidzot was only released in 2004. Butelis's second solo album Pa pāris pantiem/viesības viesnīcā was released in 2006. Gustavo also produced 2008 album Tur kaut kam ir jābūt by Latvian band Brainstorm. Gustavo released 3 singles from his next album 3. elpa - Plus/mīnuss, Par citu meiteni, Mūsu soļi. All three singles were publicly well-received, becoming top hits in many Latvian radio stations. The song Mūsu soļi became the official anthem of basketball club Rīgas VEF. On December 10, 2009, in club "Essential" was the album presentation. The album was released on June 16, 2010. After release of his last album, he turned to Iisiidiology and changed his official name to Arstarulsmirus Arsujumfus Tarus and started doing educational lectures about life.

== Discography ==
=== Albums ===
- Beidzot! (2004)
- Pa pāris pantiem/Viesības viesnīcā (2006)
- Trešā elpa (2010)
- Pilsētas portāls (2011)
- Tagad tikai sākās (2023)
- Tagad tikai sākās (Deluxe) (2024)

=== Singles ===
==== As lead artist ====
- Jau-tā-jums (2002)
- Esi brīvs (2007)
- Panā'ču! (2011)
- Everestā (2011)
- Mums vajag atpakaļ GUSTAVO (2022)
- Starp rindām (2022)
- Nāc dejot (Sirdi izkratīt) (2023)
- Kāds sakars? (2024)
- Lēmumi (2024)
- Zeme atveras (2024)
- Nepārmet man 3000 (2024)
- Jāshēmo (2024)

=== Charted singles ===
Title	Year	Peak chart positions		Album
Title	Year	LAT Air.	LAT Dom. Air.	Album
"Adata un diegs" (with Sudden Lights)	2023	19	1	Non-album single

== Videography ==
- Jau-tā-jums (ft. Žaks)
- E.V.I.T.A. (ft. Čižiks)
- Taisnā tiesa (ft. Čižiks)
- No lūpām lasi (ft. Vlady no Kasta)
- Mūsu soļi
- Paldies, ka esat!

=== As a feature ===
- Ozols - Bokss (ft. Gustavo and Astra)
- Prāta Vētra - Tur kaut kam ir jābūt (ft. Gustavo)
- Pikaso - Esi brīvs (ft. Gustavo and R-viss)
- Camillas - Mainīt pasauli (ft. Gustavo)

== Annual Latvian Music Recording Awards ==
=== Received awards ===
1. 2004: "Šāda veida ainas" (best hip hop song)
2. 2004: "Beidzot!" (best hip hop album)
3. 2006: "No lūpām lasi" (together with Vlady) (best dance music, hip hop or R’n’B song)
4. 2006: "Pa pāris pantiem/Viesības viesnīcā” (best dance music, hip hop or R’n’B album)
5. 2007: "Esi brīvs" (together with Pikaso (rapper) and R-viss) (best music video clip)
6. 2010: "Trešā elpa" (best hip hop album)
7. 2010: "Mūsu soļi" (best music video clip)

=== Nominations ===
1. 2003: "Zaudētās tiesības" (together with Mirdza Zīvere) (best hip hop song)
2. 2007: "No lūpām lasi" (together with Vlady) (best music video clip)
3. 2010: "Mainīt pasauli" (together with Camillas) (best music video clip)
4. 2010: "Kur ir mana galodiņa" (together with Čižiks) (best song)
