= Four Shores =

2006 album by Brainstorm

Studio album by Brainstorm
- Released: March 13, 2006
- Recorded: Copenhagen, Denmark and Riga, Latvia
- Genre: Pop/Rock
- Length: 50:08
- Label: Brainstorm Records
- Producer: Alex Silva

Brainstorm chronology
Četri krasti (2005)	Four Shores (2006)	Tur kaut kam ir jābūt (2008)

Four Shores (released March 2006) is an album from the Latvian band Brainstorm. It is the fourth album by the band in English and follows the Latvian version of this album Četri krasti, which was released in May 2005. The album contains 12 songs, from which 10 are in English and 2 in Russian. The lead single of this album "Thunder without Rain" became popular in Eastern Europe and video of this song had a heavy airplay on MTV Europe and European VH1. In late 2006, "Tin Drums" reached the #1 position in the MTV Baltic Charts. A video has also been shot for the song "Lonely Feeling". "Lonely Feeling" is dedicated to the Swedish actress Greta Garbo.

== Track listing ==
1. "Thunder without Rain" – 4:41
2. "Tin Drums" – 3:41
3. "Lonely Feeling (To Be Lonely)" – 3:52
4. "One Thing" – 3:49
5. "Sunday Morning" – 3:41
6. "French Cartoon" – 3:38
7. "Digitally Bright" – 3:50
8. "When Nightlife Covers the Daylight" – 4:31
9. "Sunrise" (Deep in Hell) – 3:26
10. "Leavin' to L.A." – 4:58
11. "Ветер" ("Wind") – 3:49
12. "Ты не один" ("You're Not Alone") – 4:11

== Sales ==
Region	Certification	Certified units/sales
Latvia	—	25,000
