= The Wonderful Day =

The Wonderful Day may refer to:

- The Wonderful Day (1929 film), a French silent comedy film
- The Wonderful Day (1932 film), a French comedy film
- The Wonderful Day (1980 film), a French comedy film

== See also ==
- Wonderful Day (disambiguation)
- Wonderful Days (disambiguation)
