= Tur kaut kam ir jābūt =

2008 album by Brainstorm

Tur Kaut kam ir Jābūt

Studio album by Brainstorm
- Released: May 13, 2008
- Recorded: 2007–2008, "Wolk Recording Studios", Riga
- Genre: Pop/rock
- Length: 47:06
- Label: Brainstorm
- Producer: Gustavo

Brainstorm chronology
Four Shores (2006)	Tur Kaut kam ir Jābūt (2008)	Шаг (2009)

Tur kaut kam ir jābūt is an album from the Latvian band Brainstorm. It is Brainstorm's sixteenth album in the Latvian language. "Tur kaut kam ir jābūt" is Latvian for "There has to be something". The Latvian version of the album contains thirteen songs. Two singles from the album, "Tur kaut kam ir jābūt" and "Ja tikai uz mani tu paskatītos", became very popular in Latvia. The album was produced by Latvian rapper/producer Gustavo. Tur kaut kam ir jābūt is the first Brainstorm album that features a rapper.

== Track listing ==
1. Ceļa dziesma
2. Ja tikai uz mani tu paskatītos
3. Bronza
4. Atliek nosargāt
5. Siāma
6. Es jau nāku
7. Ai nu lai
8. Par podu
9. Tur kaut kam ir jābūt
10. Laikam
11. Vakardienas trakums
12. Bēdz
13. Pamodini mani

== Sales ==
Region	Certification	Certified units/sales
Latvia	—	20,000
