= Online (album) =

2001 album by Brainstorm

Studio album by Brainstorm
- Released: September 10, 2001
- Recorded: 2000–01
- Genres: Pop rock, alternative rock, electronica
- Length: 44:19
- Label: Microphone
- Producer: Tony Mansfield

Brainstorm chronology
Kaķēns, kurš atteicās no jūrasskolas (2001)	Online (2001)	A Day Before Tomorrow (2003)

Singles from Online
- 1. "Online" Released: 2001; 2. "Maybe" Released: 2001; 3. "Waterfall" Released: 2001

Online is the second English-language international studio album by the Latvian rock band Brainstorm, released on September 10, 2001 on Microphone Records. The album was also produced by Tony Mansfield, a former member of New Musik and the record was also made in the United Kingdom. The album was also released in the Latvian version as Kaķēns, kurš atteicās no jūrasskolas" in the same year. The singles including "Online", "Maybe" and Waterfall, earned the attention, but not only in Latvia and also in Eastern Europe, Central Europe and Poland where the album was given the certification status as gold. It also sold over between 35,000 copies and later surpassed over 80,000 copies.

"Online" was also named as the "Latvian Pop Music Album of the Year" by the Annual Latvian Music Recording Awards.

== Track listing ==
No.	Title	Length
1.	"It Is Easy"	4:17
2.	"Online"	4:37
3.	"Maybe"	4:12
4.	"She's My Love"	3:11
5.	"Waterfall"	4:24
6.	"Space Detective Story"	3:40
7.	"Hide on the Moon"	3:59
8.	"The Kitten Who Didn't Want To Give Up"	3:01
9.	"Heart's Desire"	4:18
10.	"Babynight"	3:59
11.	"My Mission"	4:44

== Personnel ==
- Renārs Kaupers - vocals, guitar
- Jānis Jubalts - guitar
- Kaspars Roga - drums
- Gundars Maudevics - bass
- Maris Mihelsons - keyboards

== Release history ==
Country	Date
United Kingdom	10 September 2001
Central Europe	2001
Eastern Europe	2002
Poland	2002

== Singles ==
Single	Release date	Chart performance
Maybe	2001	1 (Poland), 8 (Greece)
Waterfall	2001	-
Online	2001	-
