= Riga Dome Choir School =

School in Riga, Latvia

Location
- Riga, Latvia
- Coordinates: 56°56′43″N 24°04′37″E

Information
- Established: July 1994, 12; 31 years ago
- Grades: From 7 till 12

Riga Cathedral Choir School is a state-run school in Riga, Latvia for boys and girls aged 7 to 18. It provides both musical and general education. The school has well-known boys', girls', and mixed choirs. The school was created on July 12, 1994.

== Programs ==
Riga Cathedral Choir School provides the following state funded licensed programs:

- Basic Education program unified curriculum including vocational education programs Vocal music, Choir class.
- Vocational education program Choral Conducting – choir singer, choir master specialities;
- Vocational education program Vocal music – academic singing – choir singer specialty;
- Vocational education program Music – jazz musician specialty.
- Vocational education program Vocal music - musical theatre singer
