= Online storage =

Online storage may refer to:

- Computer data storage on a medium or a device that is under the control of a processing unit, i.e. storage that is not offline storage
- Online file storage provided by a file hosting service
- Cloud storage, a model of networked enterprise storage

== See also ==
- Online and offline
- Nearline storage
