= About the Boy Who Plays the Tin Drum =

Studio album by Brainstorm
- Released: 25 April 2018
- Studios: Ziņģu nams (Riga); Ol Ingrids Place (Ikšķile); Studio Rymden (Stockholm)
- Genre: Pop rock
- Length: 38:55
- Label: Prāta Vātras skanu ierakstu kompanija
- Producers: Povel Olsen, David Larson

Brainstorm chronology
7 Steps of Fresh Air (2015)	About the Boy Who Plays the Tin Drum (2018)

About the Boy Who Plays the Tin Drum (Latvian: Par to zēnu, kas sit skārda bungas) is the thirteenth studio album by Latvian band Brainstorm. It was produced by Povel Olson and David Larsson, and was released on 25 April 2018 by Prāta Vētras skaņu ierakstu kompānija. English and Russian language versions with different track listings were released later in the year. Upon release, the album received mixed reviews by the Latvian media.

== Background and recording ==
The lyrics and music for the album' songs were written by the band as a whole as opposed to any particular member. The album's title is a reference to German writer Günter Grass' book Tin Drum, about the boy Oskar Matzerath, who distances himself from the horror of World War II. The album was recorded in three places: Rīga, Ikšķile and Stockholm, and was produced by Swedish producers Povel Olson and David Larsson. As customary for the band, the album's songs were recorded in three different versions: Latvian, Russian and English.

== Release ==
The Latvian version of the album, Par to zēnu, kas sit skārda bungas, was released on April 25, 2018. One month later on May 25, the band released the English version, About the Boy Who Plays the Tin Drum, with lyrics of most songs translated into English as well as a different track order and without the Latvian version's title track. A third version, Wonderful Day, was released in Moscow on December 13.

== Reception ==
The album received mixed reviews by the Latvian media. Kaspars Zaviļevskis of Delfi described the album as balladic and romantic, calling it a candidate for the best pop album of 2018.

On the other hand, Sandris Vanzovičs from Neatkarīgā Rīta Avīze wrote it was the worst of their albums, claiming that other than “”Par to zēnu, kas sist skārda bungas”, “Tevis dēļ” and “Pašu dārgāko," the rest was "a mix of Eurovision, ABBA-esque pop hits, Latvian 80s music and unnecessary experiments." Jānis Žilde wrote for TVNET that the album sounded like “four men doing their jobs,” calling the music "popcorn rock" that didn't differentiate itself from other music on the radio.

== Track listing ==
=== Par to zēnu, kas sit skārda bungas (Latvian version) ===
All music is composed by Brainstorm.

No.	Title	Length
1.	"Par to zēnu, kas sit skārda bungas"	3:40
2.	"Ogles"	4:05
3.	"Pašu dārgāko"	3:36
4.	"Tevis dēļ"	3:34
5.	"Kas būs - būs"	3:40
6.	"Šokolādes saldējums"	3:54
7.	"Paralēles"	4:18
8.	"Как Я искал тебя"	4:05
9.	"Draugam"	0:31
10.	"Bezgalīgs stāsts"	3:32
11.	"Pirmais latvietis uz mēness"	3:54
Total length:		42:49

=== Wonderful Day (Russian Version) ===
All music is composed by Brainstorm.

No.	Title	Length
1.	"Контакты"	4:05
2.	"Мой друг океан"	3:40
3.	"Для тебя"	3:34
4.	"For a Friend"	0:31
5.	"Wonderful Day"	3:32
6.	"Как Я искал тебя"	4:05
7.	"My Mind's so Lost (On You)"	3:36
8.	"Always Gonna Let You Down"	3:55
9.	"Closer to You"	4:18
10.	"Pirmais latvietis uz mēness"	3:54
Total length:		35:10

=== About the Boy Who Plays the Tin Drum (English Version) ===
All music is composed by Brainstorm.

No.	Title	Length
1.	"Nothing Lasts Forever"	4:05
2.	"Something to Memorize"	3:39
3.	"For My Girl"	3:34
4.	"For a Friend"	0:31
5.	"Wonderful Day"	3:32
6.	"Как Я искал тебя"	4:05
7.	"My Mind's so Lost (On You)"	3:36
8.	"Always Gonna Let You Down"	3:55
9.	"Closer to You"	4:18
10.	"Pirmais latvietis uz mēness"	3:54
Total length:		37:09
