= Brainstorm (Latvian band) =

Latvian band

Brainstorm Prāta Vētra
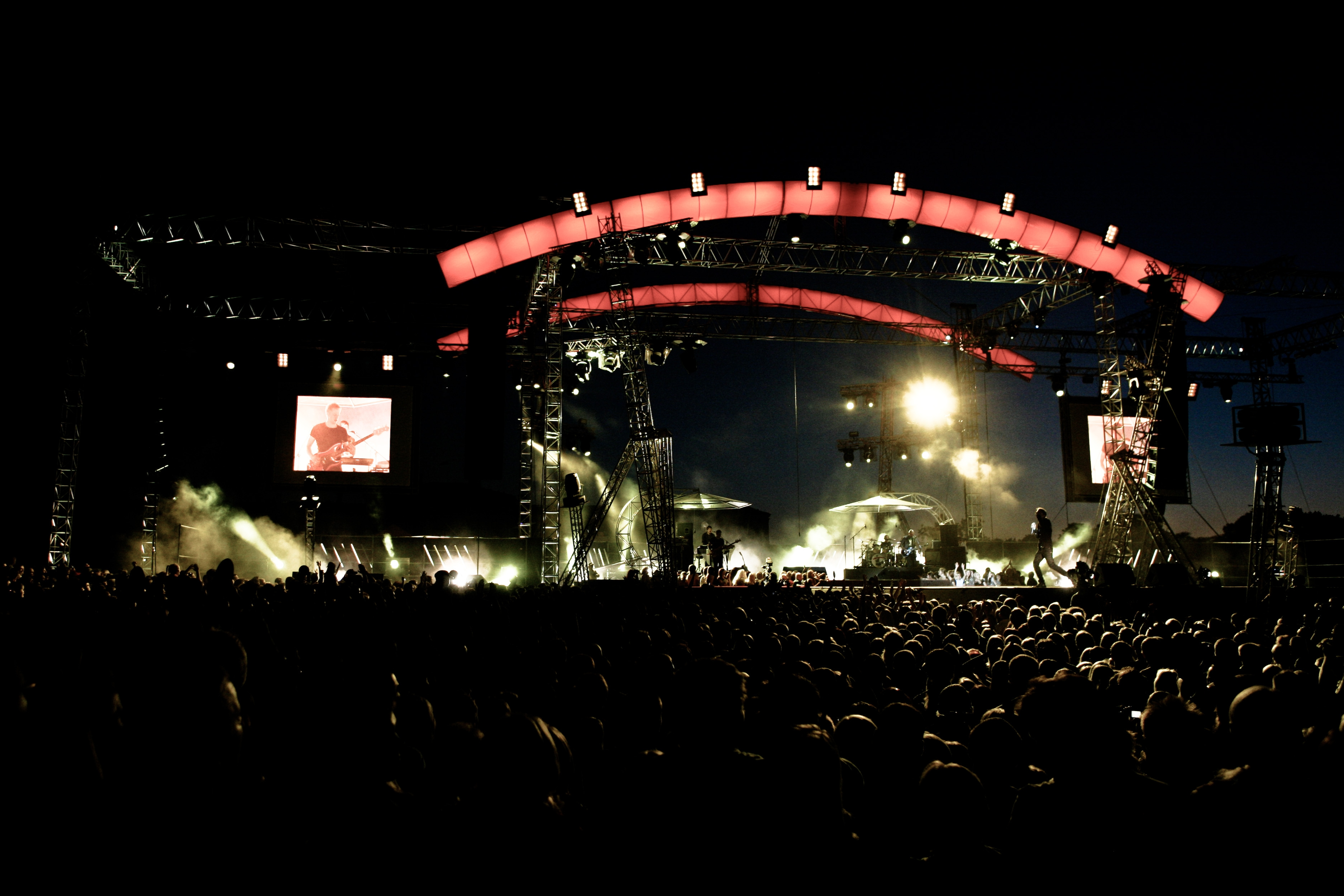
- Brainstorm performing on stage in 2008

Background information
- Origin: Jelgava, Latvia
- Genres: Pop rock, alternative rock, indie pop
- Years active: 1989–present
- Label: Brainstorm Records
- Members: Renārs Kaupers; Jānis Jubalts; Kaspars Roga; Māris Mihelsons; Ingars Viļums (touring member)
- Past members: Gundars Mauševics
- Website: brainstorm.lv

Prāta Vētra, known internationally as Brainstorm, is a Latvian pop/rock band. The band became popular internationally in 2000 when they finished third in the Eurovision Song Contest 2000 with the song "My Star".

== History ==
=== Brainstorm formation and first years (1989–1996) ===
The band was formed in the summer of 1989 in Jelgava, Latvian SSR by four former classmates – Renārs Kaupers, Jānis Jubalts, Gundars Mauševics and Kaspars Roga. Soon after, their classmate Māris Mihelsons also joined the band. It consisted of five 14-year-old guys influenced by Depeche Mode, U2 and R.E.M.

In September 1992, Brainstorm released their first single "Jo tu nāc" and finished 9th in the Latvian popular music contest "Mikrofona aptauja 1992". This was followed by their first album, Vairāk nekā skaļi in 1993. The main single from this album is "Ziema", which also has a music video.

1994 was the most quiet period in the band's history, although in that year, they released the maxi-single Vietu nav (No vacancies), with only 500 copies being released. In 1995, one of the band's earlier songs "Lidmašīnas" (Airplanes) became one of the most commercially successful singles in Latvia and song of the year on Radio Super FM. The band also performed in Germany and the United Kingdom. After experimenting with alternative music, Brainstorm returned to mainstream music and released their next album Veronika. The most popular songs from the album were "Dārznieks", "Apelsīns" and "Lidmašīnas", and the band's concert attendance increased.

At the end of the year, Latvian radio stations started to play the song "Tavas mājas manā azotē", which topped the Latvian Airplay charts for 9 weeks and became the biggest hit of 1996.

=== Contract with Microphone Records, Eurovision Song contest (1997–2000) ===
The next step was signing a contract with Microphone Records, one of the biggest record companies in Latvia and releasing the next album, Viss ir tieši tā kā tu vēlies in 1997. The album attained gold status. The main tracks from the album were "Viss ir tieši tā kā tu vēlies", "Mans draugs", "Neatgriešanās" and "Tavas mājas manā azotē". Subsequently, the band received offers to manage TV and radio shows and to take part in musical performances at Dailes Theatre in Riga as part of The Good Soldier Švejk, which became the most visited theatre show in Latvia. Brainstorm's first international single was recorded in 1998 in Germany with Volker Hinkel, the producer of Fool's Garden. This single was "Under my wing", the English version of "Tavas mājas manā azotē". The single was aired in the Baltic states and also other countries. Soon after this, the band was awarded the Grand Prix prize at the Karlshamn music festival in Sweden.

In 1999, Brainstorm released their fourth album "Starp divām saulēm" and their first international album Among the Suns, which is the English version of "Starp divām saulēm". The album was recorded in Sweden and Denmark. All five singles from the album – "Puse no sirds" (Half of a heart), "Starp divām saulēm" (Among the suns), "Lec" (English version – "Try"), "Prom uz siltajām salām" (Eng. version – "Ain't it funny") and "Tu izvēlējies palikt" (Eng. version – "Welcome to my country") reached the top of the Latvian radio charts shortly after release. On 13 May 2000 in Sweden, in only 3 minutes, Prāta Vētra or Brainstorm became an internationally noticed band when they participated in the 45th Eurovision Song Contest in 2000. Their song "My Star" achieved 3rd place among 24 contestants with their country's debut. "My Star" was played internationally thereafter. In August 2000, after more than 10 years of performing, The best of Brainstorm '89-'99 was released and included the band's most popular, interesting and unreleased songs.

=== New albums, MTV awards (2001–2010) ===
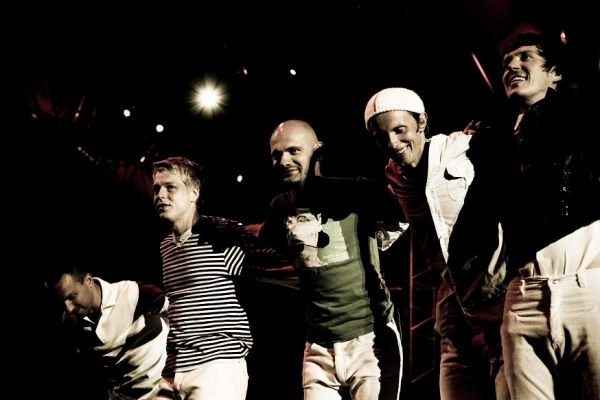
Brainstorm at Mežaparks in 2008

The Online album was released in 2001 or, in the Latvian version, – Kaķēns, kurš atteicās no jūrasskolas. The album featured the track "Maybe." The video was shot in Prague. The second single "Waterfall" also achieved success, and had a video which was shot in Finland. Another track "Spogulīt, spogulīt", contains the lines of the fairytale about Snow White by the Brothers Grimm.

The next album Dienās, kad lidlauks pārāk tāls or A Day Before Tomorrow was released in 2003. The lead singles of this album – "Colder" and "A day before tomorrow" (the English version of "Plaukstas lieluma pavasaris") – were produced by German producer Alex Silva. The majority of the album was produced by UK producer Steve Lyon. The album was recorded in Germany and Denmark. In 2003 Brainstorm were the support band for The Rolling Stones at their concert in Prague. Brainstorm presented a saxophone to Mick Jagger for his birthday.

In 2004, one of the band founders died on the night of May 22 and 23 in a car accident on the highway between Riga and Jelgava – bassist Gundars Mauševics or as his friends called him – Mumiņš was only 29 years old. Despite this loss, the other band members continued working.

In 2004, Brainstorm and a well-known Belarusian band Bi-2 recorded the song "Skol'zkie Ulitsy", which was included on their album "Inomarki", released on 2 March 2004 and which reached number 1 on radio charts in Latvia, Ukraine and Russia. Brainstorm and Bi-2 performed this composition together during the concert tour of Bi-2 in Moscow, Saint Petersburg and Latvia.

In 2005, Brainstorm released their album Četri krasti. In its recording a fifth person took part: bass guitarist Ingars Viļums. He also took part in a tour over Russia which presented the album.

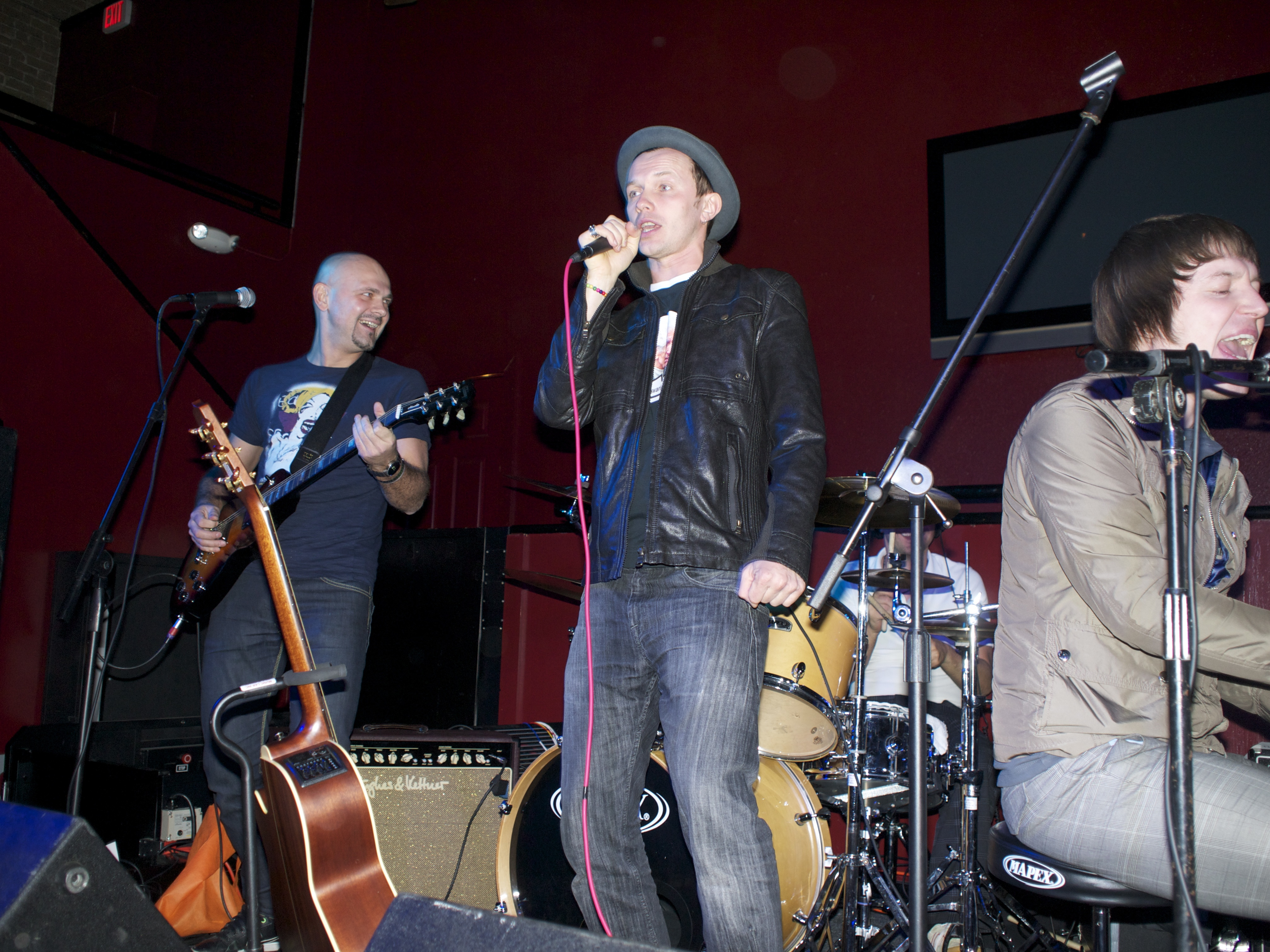
Brainstorm performing in 2010

The album featured tracks such as "Četri krasti", "Rudens" and "Pilots Tims". On 21 August 2005 Brainstorm played a concert in Mežaparks attended by 40,000 people. At the beginning of 2006 Brainstorm released an English version of Četri krasti – Four Shores. The lead single "Thunder Without Rain" became popular in most of Europe and received airplay on MTV Europe and VH1 Europe.

They received the MTV Europe Music award for Best Baltic Act in 2006. In 2009, War, an album written singularly in Latvian and Russian was released in Eastern Europe with reasonable success, the English version, Years and Seconds, followed a year later with more popular audience feedback, although the meanings of several songs had to be altered to fit English lyrics. Concerts have been held by the band in Western Europe and they continue to gain popularity in the United Kingdom due to their similarity to Beirut.

=== 2012 ===
In 2012, Brainstorm received nominations in four categories at the Annual Latvian Music Recording Awards, winning three of them.

The band's album Another Still Life, released the same year, was written and recorded in Hudson, a historic town in New York’s Hudson Valley. Mixing took place in a small studio located beneath the management office of the British band Radiohead in Oxford, England.

The title track of the album features lyrics composed entirely of rearranged painting titles, forming a cohesive song. Another track, Lantern, reflects on the band's childhood, their formation, and their rise to large-scale success in Eastern Europe.

Following the release of Another Still Life, Brainstorm embarked on a tour across Latvia, drawing a total audience of 89,500 over seven concerts — an impressive figure relative to the country’s population of two million. In the autumn of 2012, the band extended their tour to Russia to promote the album's release there.

During the 2012 festival season, Brainstorm performed at several international events, including The Great Escape (UK), Music Matters (Singapore), Rock for People (Czech Republic), Nashestvie, Kubana, Krilya, and Red Rocks (Russia), Watergate (Estonia), Sziget (Hungary), Vilnius Music Week (Lithuania), Culture Collide (USA), and Live Sessions Day (Spain).

=== 2013 ===
In June 2013, Brainstorm performed at the Glastonbury Festival, becoming the first band from the Baltic region to do so.

=== 2015 ===
The band finished a new album, produced by Alex Silva. Silva worked on the new compositions in Berlin at the famous Hansa Studio.The band's albums are usually released first in their home country of Latvia. On 10 February 2015 they released the first single, "Ziemu apēst," from the Latvian version of the album 7 soļi svaiga gaisa (7 Steps of Fresh Air). On the same day, they also launched ticket sales for their summer tour.

The album was released in Latvian and Russian versions on 19 May 2015. The Russian version had songs in Russian, Latvian, and English.

In the aftermath of annexation of Crimea by the Russian Federation Brainstorm drew condemnation by being one of the headliners for the 2015 Russian rock festival Nashestvie, a significant part of which featured Russian military parades, plane flyovers, war songs and recruitment into the Russian army. A few days later Brainstorm responded by saying: "We play our music to people, not flags, and we think that culture, just like sports, should stand over politics, as it's a direct link to people in the language of the heart."

On 1 December, Brainstorm released "7 soļi svaiga gaisa", a DVD of their Riga concert.

=== 2016 ===
Brainstorm started the New Year announcing the first dates for the "7 Steps of fresh air" Spring Concert Tour in Europe. In total, they played 7 shows – 2 in the Baltic countries (Estonia and Lithuania) and 5 cities in the United Kingdom.

On 23 January, Brainstorm song "Ziemu apēst" was awarded as the most valuable song of 2015 at "Latvian Radio 2" annual award ceremony "Muzikālā Banka".

On 13 February, the IX annual award ceremony of "Nashe Radio" was held in Russia and Brainstorm got awarded in the category "Leaders of the Chart" for the song "Epoha". This song has been holding in the chart "Чартова дюжина" for a record-long time – almost 4 months, during which it reached the very top twice – in July and August.

On 15 February, Brainstorm released the song "Little Raindrops" that is the English version of the previously released "Ziemu apēst" from the album "7 Steps of fresh Air". The first live performance of "Little Raindrops" was in the final show of the Lithuanian "X Factor".

In the annual Latvian Music Record Awards ceremony "Zelta Mikrofons", Brainstorm received an award for their live concert "7 Steps of Fresh Air" from the tour's final concert in Riga and an award for "Alfa song of the year" from the "Alfa" shopping centre. That is the only prize where the winner is determined by a public vote and so the song "Ziemu apēst" got the most votes from the listeners, which brought the band their 31st Golden Microphone award in total.

In the middle of the year, the band also participated in several music festivals, such as "Янтарный Пляж" in Kaliningrad, the festival "A-Fest" in Minsk and "Weekend Festival Baltic" in Pärnu.

On 20 August, Brainstorm held their only concert in Latvia – stadium "Daugava", Liepāja, gathering more than 28 000 people not only from Latvia but also the Baltic Countries, as well as the United States, Canada, Australia, Russia and even Japan. Demand for concert tickets was so great that even before the start of the concert, it was declared a sold-out.

At the end of the year, Brainstorm went to Moscow with their solo concert. In 2015 the band presented their latest album "7 Steps of fresh air" in the capital of Russia and it was very well received. During the year the songs from the album managed to not only rank the Russian radio charts but also resound in music festivals – such as "Bosco Fresh Fest", "VK Fest", "A-Fest", "Нашествие", where Brainstorm performed as headliners.

The documentary "Brainstorm: Between shores" got awarded with National cinematography award "Lielais Kristaps" in the category "Best sound engineer" as well as Delfi.lv public choice award.

=== 2025 ===
The band released their newest album Pūķa Lietošanas Instrukcija and announced five tour dates across Latvia.

== Members ==
- Renārs Kaupers – vocals, guitar (1989–present)
- Jānis Jubalts – guitar (1989–present)
- Māris Mihelsons – keyboard, accordion and other instruments (1989–present)
- Kaspars Roga – drums, percussion (1989–present)
- Gundars Mauševics – bass guitar (1989–2004, died 2004)

== Festivals ==
- Glastonbury (Somerset, England)
- Sziget (Budapest, Hungary)
- Atlas Weekend (Kyiv, Ukraine)
- Kryl'ja (Russian: Крылья, lit. 'Wings') (Moscow, Russia)
- Nashestvie (Russian: Нашествие) (Tver Oblast, Russia)
- Red Rocks (Chelyabinsk, Russia)
- Weekend Festival Baltic (Pärnu, Estonia)
- Rock For People (Hradec Králové, Czech Republic)
- Watergate World Music Festival (Estonia)
- Culture Collide Festival (Los Angeles, California, US)
- Live Sessions Day (Spain)

== Discography ==
=== International albums ===
- Vietu nav (1994)
- Among the Suns (2000) (FI #13; BEL #42; SWE #47)
- Online (2001)
- A Day Before Tomorrow (2003) (POL #47)
- Four Shores (2006)
- Years and Seconds (2010)
- Another Still Life (2012)
- 7 Steps of Fresh Air (2015)
- Wonderful Day (2018)
- About the Boy Who Plays the Tin Drum (2018)
- Lonesome Moon (2021)

=== International singles ===
- "My Star" (2000) (BEL #8; SWE #22)
- "Weekends Are Not My Happy Days" (2000) (BEL #13)
- "Maybe" (2001) (POL #1; GRE #8)
- "Vyhodnye" (2004) (UKR #21)

=== Albums in Latvian ===
- Vairāk nekā skaļi (1993)
- Veronika (1996)
- Viss ir tieši tā kā tu vēlies (1997)
- Starp divām saulēm (1999)
- Izlase '89-'99 (2000)
- Kaķēns, kurš atteicās no jūrasskolas (2001)
- Dienās, kad lidlauks pārāk tāls (2003)
- Veronika (2004)
- Četri krasti (2005)
- Tur kaut kam ir jābūt (2008)
- Vēl viena klusā daba (2012)
- 7 soļi svaiga gaisa (2015)
- Par to zēnu, kas sit skārda bungas (2018)
- Gads bez kalendāra (2021)
- Pagalmi (2023)
- Pūķa Lietošanas Instrukcija (2025)

=== Albums in Russian ===
- Шаг (2009)
- Чайки На Крышах (2012)
- 7 Steps of Fresh Air (2015)
- Wonderful Day (2018)
- Год без календаря (2021)

Awards and achievements
Preceded by None	Latvia in the Eurovision Song Contest; 2000	Succeeded by Arnis Mednis with "Too Much"
