= Ruslana discography =

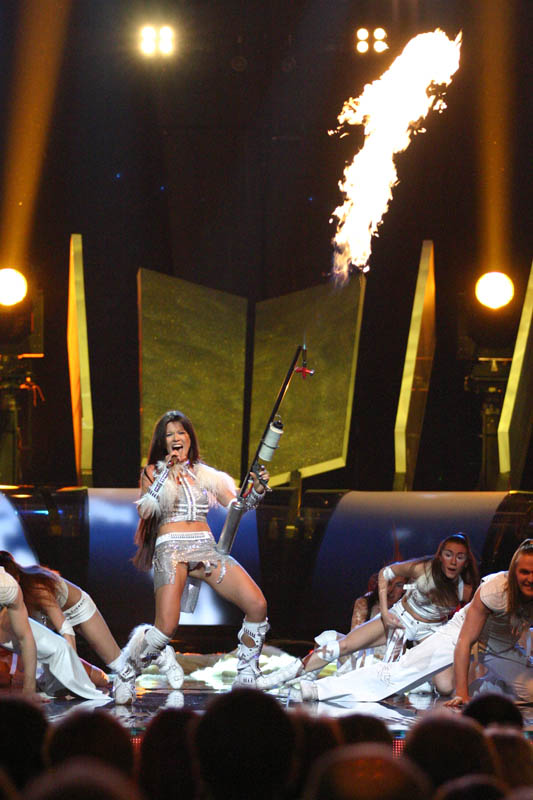
- Ruslana in Kiev 2005
- Studio albums: 7
- Singles: 5
- Music videos: 30
- Collaborations: 4
- DVDs: 5

This page includes full the discography of the Ukrainian artist Ruslana, including albums and singles, in both Ukrainian and English languages.

== Ruslana's discography ==
=== Studio albums ===
Year	Album	Peak chart positions			Certifications	Sales
Year	Album	UKR	CZE	BEL	Certifications	Sales
1998	Myt Vesny – Dzvinkyi Viter: 1st studio album	2	-	-	—N/a	
2001	Naikrashche: 2nd studio album	-	-	-	—N/a	
2003	Dobryi vechir, tobi...: 3rd studio album	-	-	-	—N/a	
2003	Dyki Tantsi: 4th studio album	1	-	-	UKR: Platinum	UKR: 170,000
2004	Wild Dances: 5th studio album; First album released after Eurovision victory; First English-language album; Contains several songs that were also included on "Dyki Tantsi"	1	20	59	UKR: 7× Platinum; SVK: Platinum; BEL: Gold; CZE: Gold; ROM: Gold	UKR: 700,000; BEL: 25,000; ROM: 5,000
2008	Amazonka: 6th studio album	1	29	-	—N/a	
2008	Wild Energy: 7th studio album; Contains English versions of the songs from Amazonka	7	-	-	—N/a	
2012	Ey-fory-ya: 8th studio album; Contains an anthem for the UEFA EURO 2012	1	-	-	—N/a	
2013	My Boo: 9th studio album; Contains English versions of the songs from Ey-fory-ya	1	-	-	—N/a	

=== EP ===
Year	Album
2020	Ми Вітер
2020	Молитва світла: Prayer album
2023	Різдвяний сон: Christmas EP

=== Other albums ===
Year	Album
2000	Ostannie rizdvo 90-kh: Christmas Album
2005	Club'in: Remix album; Mainly contains remixes of songs from "Wild Dances"

=== DVDs ===
Year	Album
2008	Wild Energy. Amazon. Wild Dances: Compilation of Video Clips from 2000 - 2008

=== English Singles ===
Year	Single	Chart positions																	Album
Year	Single	UK	IRE	SLO	SWE	FIN	GRE	TUR	NL	AUT	CHE	LAT	GER	ROM	EU	UKR	Belgian Flanders	Belgian Wallonia	Album
2004	"Wild Dances"	47	44	21	8	20	1	2	30	43	24	36	40	44	16	1	1	25	Wild Dances
2004	"Dance with the Wolves"	—	—	—	—	—	—	—	—	—	—	—	—	95	28	3	19	—	Wild Dances
2005	"The Same Star"	—	—	—	—	—	—	—	—	—	—	—	—	60	19	1	50	—	Wild Dances
2005	"Ring Dance With The Wolves"	—	—	—	—	—	—	—	—	—	—	—	—	100	37	1	—	—	Wild Dances - New Year Edition
2008	"Moon of Dreams"	—	—	—	—	—	—	—	—	—	—	—	—	77	—	1	—	—	Wild Energy
2017	"It's Magical"	—	—	—	—	—	—	—	—	—	—	—	—	—	—	—	—	—	Ми Вітер EP
2020	"We Are Wind"	—	—	—	—	—	—	—	—	—	—	—	—	—	—	—	—	—	Ми Вітер EP

=== Ukrainian singles ===
Year	Single	Chart positions		Album
Year	Single	UA	EU	Album
2003	"Znayu Ya"	1		Dyki Tantsi
2003	"Kolomyika"	1		Dyki Tantsi
2003	"Oi, Zahraimy, Muzychenku"	1		Dyki Tantsi
2005	"Skazhy Meni"	1		Dyki Tantsi
2005	"U Rytmi Sertsia"	5	45	Non Album
2006	"Dyka Enerhiya"	1		Non Album
2008	"Vidlunnia Mriy"	1		Amazonka
2008	"Vohon chy lid"	6		Amazonka
2010	"Dykyi Anhel"	40		Amazonka
2010	"Ya idu za toboyu"	15		Amazonka
2011	"Wow"	7	79	EY-fori-YA
2011	"Sha-la-la"	4	55	EY-fori-YA
2012	"Davaj, hraj!"	12		EY-fori-YA
2012	"Ey-phori-Ya"	9	80	EY-fori-YA
2013	"Rackmaninov"	19		EY-fori-YA
2015	"Ty Shche Vidkryyesh Ochi"			Non-album Single
2017	"Ya Lyublyu"			Non-album Single
2018	"Pater Noster"			Non-album Single
2020	"Мi Viter"			Ми Вітер EP
2023	"Lirnytsia"			Wild Heart
2024	"Кам’яна Діва"			
2025	"Гей, Маланка"			

=== Unreleased songs ===
- "Drum 'n' Dance"
- "Wind Song"

=== Soundtracks ===
Soundtracks containing Ruslana songs.

- 2007: Heartbreak Hotel Soundtrack – "Dance with the Wolves"
- 2007: Heartbreak Hotel Soundtrack – "Wild Dances Part II"
- 2008: Grand Theft Auto IV – "Wild Dances"
- 2012: How I Became an Elephant – "Smak legendy"

== Music videos ==
- "Ty" (1998)
- "Myt Vesny - Dzvinkyi Viter" (1998)
- "Svitanok" (1998)
- "Balada pro pryntsesu" (1998)
- "Kolyskova" (1998)
- "Znayu Ya" (2000)
- "Proschannia z dysko" (2001)
- "Dobryi vechir, tobi..." (2002)
- "Kolomyika" (2003)
- "Oi, Zahraimy, Muzychenku" (2003)
- "Wild Dances" (2004)
- "Dance with the Wolves" (2004)
- "Ring Dance with the Wolves" (2005)
- "The Same Star" (2005)
- "U rytmi sertsia" (2005)
- "Dyka Enerhiya" (2006)
- "Vidlunnia mriy" [Ukr. version of "Moon of Dreams"] (2008)
- "Moon of Dreams" (feat. T-Pain) (2008)
- "Vohon chy lid" (2008)
- "Silent Angel" (2009)
- "Wow" (2011)
- "Sha-la-la" (2011)
- "Davaj, graj!" (2012)
- "Miy brat" (2012)
- "Tse Ey-fori-ya" (2012)
- "Rachmaninoff" (2012)
- "WOW (English Version)" (2013)
- "Sha-la-la (English Version)" (2013)
- "This Is Euphoria" (2013)
- "Rachmaninoff (English Version)" (2013)
- "Ya Lyublyu" (2017)
- "It's Magical" (2017)
- "Mi viter" (2020)
- "Hodyt son" (2021)
- "Lirnytsia" (2023)
