= Ruslana's Charity Concert =

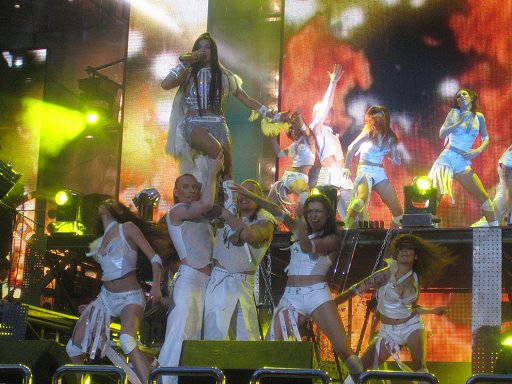
Ruslana performing Wild Dances song at the concert

The Heart Of Europe Concert was a concert held on May 18, 2005, in Kyiv's Maidan Nezalezhnosti as part of Eurovision Song Contest 2005 opening. It was translated live on at least two national TV channels 1+1 and Inter –

Ruslana sang the following songs:

1. "Wild Dances"
2. "Like a Hurricane"
3. "Arcan"
4. "The Tango We Used To Dance"
5. "Wild Passion"
6. "Wild Dances part II"
7. "Dance with the Wolves"
8. "Accordion Intro"
9. "The Same Star"
10. "Heart on Fire"
11. "Ja Tebe Ljublu"
12. "Play for me Musician"
13. "Wind Song"
14. "Kolomyjka"
15. "Drum 'n' Dance"

After her performance Ruslana finished the show by lighting a symbolic Heart of Europe. The same heart was lighted in all big cities of Ukraine – Odesa, Lviv, Donetsk, Dnipropetrovsk, Kharkiv by girls called Ruslana. After this ceremony Ruslana performed the anthem of Eurovision one more time. The fireworks were being shot during this performance.

Other performers :

- Elena Paparizou – "My Number One"
- Shiri Maimon – "Hasheket Shenish'ar"
- Martin Vučić – "Make My Day"
- GreenJolly – "Razom nas bahato"
- Gracia – "Run and Hide"
- Boris Novković feat. Lado Members – "Vukovi Umiru Sami"
- Valters & Kaža – "The War Is Not Over"
- Laura & The Lovers – "Little By Little"
