= Wild Energy. Amazon. Wild Dances =

Video (Music Videos) by Ruslana
- Released: November 2008
- Recorded: 2000–2008
- Genre: Pop
- Length: 102:12
- Label: Comp Music, Ego Works
- Producer: Ego Works, Ruslana & Oleksandr Ksenofontov

Wild Energy. Amazon. Wild Dances is the first DVD compilation by the Ukrainian singer Ruslana. It contains several of her music clips from 2000 to her releases in 2008. Video clips from the "Wild Dances" and "Diki Tantsi" are bonus tracks on the DVD.

== Track listing ==
1. Presentation video (EPK)

Amazonka

1. "Dyka Enerhija"
2. Making Of "Dyka Enerhija"
3. "Vidlunnya mrij" feat. T-Pain
4. Making Of "Vidlunya Mrij"
5. "Vohon' chy lid"
6. Making Of "Vohon‘ chy lid"
7. "Dykyy Anhel"

Wild Energy

1. "Teasers"
2. "Wild Energy"
3. Making of "Wild Energy"
4. "Moon of Dreams" feat. T-Pain
5. Making of "Moon of Dreams"
6. "Silent Angel"

Dyki Tantsi

1. "Dyki Tantsi"
2. Making Of "Dyki Tantsi"
3. "Skazhy Meni"
4. Making Of "Skazhy Meni"
5. "Oj, Zagraimy, Muzychenku"
6. Making Of "Oj, Zagraimy, Muzychenku"
7. "Kolomyjka"
8. Making Of "Kolomyjka"
9. "Znaju Ja"
10. Making Of "Znaju Ja"

Wild Dances

1. "Wild Dances"
2. Making Of "Wild Dances"
3. "Dance with the Wolves"
4. Making Of "Dance with the Wolves"
5. "The Same Star"
6. Making Of "The Same Star"

== Chart performance ==
Country	Chart	Peak
Ukraine	UMKA Best-sellers Top 13	2
Ukraine	UMKA Best of 2008	27
Ukraine	UMKA Video of 2012	3
