= Wild Energy =

Wild Energy may refer to:

- Wild Energy (album), an album by Ruslana
- "Wild Energy" (song) or "Dyka Enerhiya", a song by Ruslana
- Wild Energy. Lana, a novel by Maryna and Serhiy Dyachenko

== See also ==
- Wild Energy. Amazon. Wild Dances, a DVD compilation by Ruslana
