= Wild. Club'in =

Wild. Club'In

Remix album by Ruslana
- Released: November 26, 2005 (Ukraine); 2006 (Czech Republic, Slovakia)
- Recorded: 2004
- Genre: Dance-pop
- Length: 78:54
- Label: Luxen studios
- Producer: Ruslana, Olexander Ksenofontov et al.

Ruslana chronology
Wild Dances (2004)	Wild. Club'In (2005)	Wild Energy (2008)

Alternative cover
- Czech/Slovak edition (2006)

Wild. Club'in is the name of Ruslana's remix album that contains remixes of tracks from her 2004 Wild Dances album, and a couple of other songs as well, such as Wind Song and Drum 'n' Dance. For the remixes was organised a contest for the best 12 remixes of Ruslana's songs. The winning remixes were included on this album. It has been released in 2006 in the Czech Republic and Slovakia under the title Tance s vlky. The Czech version is a compilation of the Dyki tantsi, Wild Dances and Club'in albums.

== Track listing ==
#	Title	Remixer(s)	Time
1.	"Wild Passion"	DJ Small and LV	
2.	"Dance with the Wolves"	Harem	
3.	"Hey, Go with Me!"	DJ Small & LV	
4.	"Play, Musician"	Treat Brothers	
5.	"Wind Song"	Mikhail Nekrasov	
6.	"Wild Dances"	DJ Small & LV	
7.	"The Same Star"	Treat Brothers	
8.	"The Tango We Used to Dance"	DJ Small & LV	
9.	"Dance with the Wolves"	Treat Brothers	
10.	"The Same Star"	DJ Zebra & Sergey Repin	
11.	"Wind Song"	DJ Small & LV	
12.	"Wild Dances"	C.V.T. vs DJ Nick	

=== Czech/Slovak edition ===
A special edition of the album has been released in 2006 in the Czech Republic and Slovakia and includes two CDs, the first one with songs from the Dyki tantsi and Wild Dances albums and the second one with the remixes from the basic edition of the Club'in album.

==== CD 1 ====
#	Title	Writer(s)	Time
1.	"Oj, zahraj'me muzicenku"	Ruslana, Oleksandr Ksenofontov	3:55
2.	"Znaju ya"	Ruslana, O. Ksenofontov	3:11
3.	"Ples"	Ruslana, O. Ksenofontov, Andriy Babkin	3:41
4.	"Arkan"	Ruslana, O. Ksenofontov	3:40
5.	"Skazhy meni"	Ruslana, O. Ksenofontov, Andriy Kuzmenko	4:40
6.	"Kolomyika"	Ruslana, O. Ksenofontov	4:02
7.	"Hutsulka"	Ruslana, O. Ksenofontov	3:55
8.	"Pivnichna"	Ruslana, O. Ksenofontov, Yulia Mishchenko	3:36
9.	"Tse - ljubov"	Ruslana, O. Ksenofontov	4:00
10.	"Ya tebe ljublu"	Ruslana, O. Ksenofontov	3:40
11.	"Znaju ya (CJ Nekrasov remix)"	Ruslana, O. Ksenofontov	2:50
12.	"Wild Dances"	Ruslana, O. Ksenofontov	3:00

==== CD 2 ====
#	Title	Remixer(s)	Writer(s)
1.	"Wild Passion"	DJ Small and LV	Roman Bokarev, Mikhail Mishensky
2.	"Dance with the Wolves"	Harem	Ruslana, R. Bokarev, M. Mishensky
3.	"Hey, Go with Me!"	DJ Small & LV	Ruslana, Oleksandr Ksenofontov
4.	"Play, Musician"	Treat Brothers	Ruslana, O. Ksenofontov
5.	"Wind Song"	Mikhail Nekrasov	Ruslana, O. Ksenofontov
6.	"Wild Dances"	DJ Small & LV	Ruslana, O. Ksenofontov
7.	"The Same Star"	Treat Brothers	Ruslana, O. Ksenofontov, R. Bokarev, M. Mishensky, Steve Balsamo
8.	"The Tango we Used to Dance"	DJ Small & LV	Ruslana, R. Bokarev, M. Mishensky
9.	"Dance with the Wolves"	Treat Brothers	Ruslana, R. Bokarev, M. Mishensky
10.	"The Same Star"	DJ Zebra & Sergey Repin	Ruslana, O. Ksenofontov, R. Bokarev, M. Mishensky, S. Balsamo
11.	"Wind Song"	DJ Small & LV	Ruslana, O. Ksenofontov
12.	"Wild Dances"	C.V.T. vs DJ Nick	Ruslana, O. Ksenofontov

== Charts ==
Country	Peak
Ukraine (UMKA)	1
Czech Republic (IFPI)	-
