= Dva Puti, Dva Shliakhy =

2009 song by Ruslana and Varvara

"Dva Puti, Dva Shlakhy"

Song by Ruslana, Varvara
- Released: 2009
- Recorded: Ukraine
- Genre: Pop
- Length: 4:29
- Label: Luxen Studio
- Songwriter: Oleksandr Ksenofontov
- Producers: Ruslana, O. Ksenofontov

"Dva Puti, Dva Shliakhy" (Ukrainian: and Russian: «Два пути, два шляхи», lit. 'Two ways, two roads') is a song recorded by the Ukrainian singer, Ruslana, and Russian pop star, Varvara. The author of the song is Ruslana's husband Oleksandr Ksenofontov. The basic song is in Ukrainian and Russian languages, but Ruslana also recorded an English version.

Rumours of the duet had been circling for some time, but the long-awaited partnership was still a surprise - albeit a very welcome one - for many fans. The song Two Ways is described as a combination of two Slavic cultures, and is bilingual. Due to tour commitments, the recording of the song actually took a whole year to be completed.

Ruslana, who won the Eurovision Song Contest for Ukraine in 2004 on the country's second ever attempt, met Varvara at one of the Eurovision parties during the Kyiv contest of 2005, and the two became firm friends.

== Chart performance ==
| Song | Chart | Peak Position |
|---|---|---|
| Dva Puti, Dva Shliakhy | Ukraine Top 40 | 10 |
| Dva Puti, Dva Shliakhy | Ukrainian Airplay | 6 |
