= Amazonka =

Studio album by Ruslana
- Released: 7 March 2008
- Recorded: 2006–2007
- Genre: Pop rock, dance-pop, electropop
- Length: 40:00
- Language: Ukrainian, English (CZ and SK editions)
- Label: EMI (Ukraine, Czech Republic, Slovakia, Bulgaria)
- Producer: Trevor Fletcher, Ruslana, O. Ksenofontov

Ruslana chronology
Club'in (2005)	Amazonka (2008)	Wild Energy (2008)

Singles from Amazonka
- 1. "Dyka Enerhija" Released: July 18, 2006; 2. "Vidlunnja Mirij" Released: April, 2008; 3. "Vohon' chy lid" Released: June 21, 2008; 4. "Dykyy anhel" Released: 2009; 5. "Ya idu za toboiu" Released: April 12, 2010

Amazonka (Ukrainian: Амазонка; English: Amazon) is the sixth studio album by Ruslana. The album was released in Eastern Europe, Germany, China and other countries.

The album is based on the book Wild Energy. Lana. In the book, Lana breaks free from the normal cycle of an energy-efficient-gone-wrong future life. Each track is in order to the chapters of the book, conveying the different emotions in what the character and co-characters feel. Ruslana's music has turned to a new electronic/futuristic feel, in keeping with the setting of the book.

== About the album ==
The people who created this album tend to characterize its original style as pop-fantasy. It's based on hurricane music chapters – the ones which conjure up pictures of fights between Tolkien's orcs and confrontation of Elements of Nature in Carpathians. Lightning, thunderstorm, hurricanes and industrial sounds of terrific fantastic plant – they are regular instruments in songs of "Amazon". But despite the above, the dense commercial sound and modern jagged grooves attribute to the album. These features are common in American charts’ top hits. This is particularly due to the fantastic work completed by American producers Trevor Flercher (director of Hit Factory Criteria studio in Miami) and Egoworks Music. A portion of exotics is in ethnical (rather Balkan) motives and samples. Several authentic instruments sound as though they're not as real but owned to tribes from mystical tales. And the central kernel of this all is, of course, Ruslana's distinctive drive and energy.

On the Czech and Slovak editions of the album, a bonus track is included.

== Track listing ==
#	Title	Writer(s)	Time
1.	"Dyka Enerhija"	Ruslana, Roman Bokarev, Mikhail Mishensky, Oleksandr Ksenofontov	04:00
2.	"Vidlunnya mrij"	Ruslana, R. Bokarev, M. Mishensky, O. Ksenofontov, Karina Yasynova	03:58
3.	"My budemo pershi"	Ruslana, R. Bokarev, M. Mishensky, O. Ksenofontov, Toma Primak	03:24
4.	"Ya idu za toboiu"	Ruslana, O. Ksenofontov	04:00
5.	"Ty zhyva (Synthetichna)"	Ruslana, R. Bokarev, M. Mishensky, O. Ksenofontov	03:37
6.	"Vohon' chy lid (Vse ne te)"	Ruslana, O. Ksenofontov	02:55
7.	"De ty moja ljubov"	Ruslana, O. Ksenofontov	03:40
8.	"Dykyy anhel"	R. Bokarev, M. Mishensky, O. Ksenofontov, K. Yasynova	03:20
9.	"Ne dlia prodazhu"	R. Bokarev, M. Mishensky, O. Ksenofontov, K. Yasynova	03:19
10.	"Yak zmitny maibutie"	Ruslana, O. Ksenofontov, T. Primak, K. Yasynova	03:35

== Release history ==
Region	Date	Label	Format	Catalog #
Ukraine	March 7, 2008	EMI	Compact disc	—
Czech Republic	April 10, 2008	EMI	Compact disc	—
Slovakia	April 17, 2008	EMI	Compact disc	—
Bulgaria	April 17, 2008	EMI	Compact disc	—

== Chart performance ==
Country	Peak
Ukraine (UMKA)	1
Slovakia (IFPI)	26
Czech Republic (IFPI)	29

== Singles ==
- Dyka Enerhija
- Vidlunnya mrii
- Vohon' chy lid
- Dykj anhel
- Ya jdu za toboju
