= Die Grand Prix Hitliste =

2006 music competition

Date and venue
- Final: 20 May 2006
- Venue: NDR Studios; Hamburg, Germany

Organisation
- Broadcaster: ARD (Note: Arbeitsgemeinschaft der öffentlich-rechtlichen Rundfunkanstalten der Bundesrepublik Deutschland) – Norddeutscher Rundfunk (NDR)
- Presenters: Thomas Hermanns; Georg Uecker

Participants
- Number of entries: 20

Vote
- Voting system: Combination of televote, jury vote and an online poll (German public only)
- Winning song: (Ukraine) "Wild Dances" by Ruslana

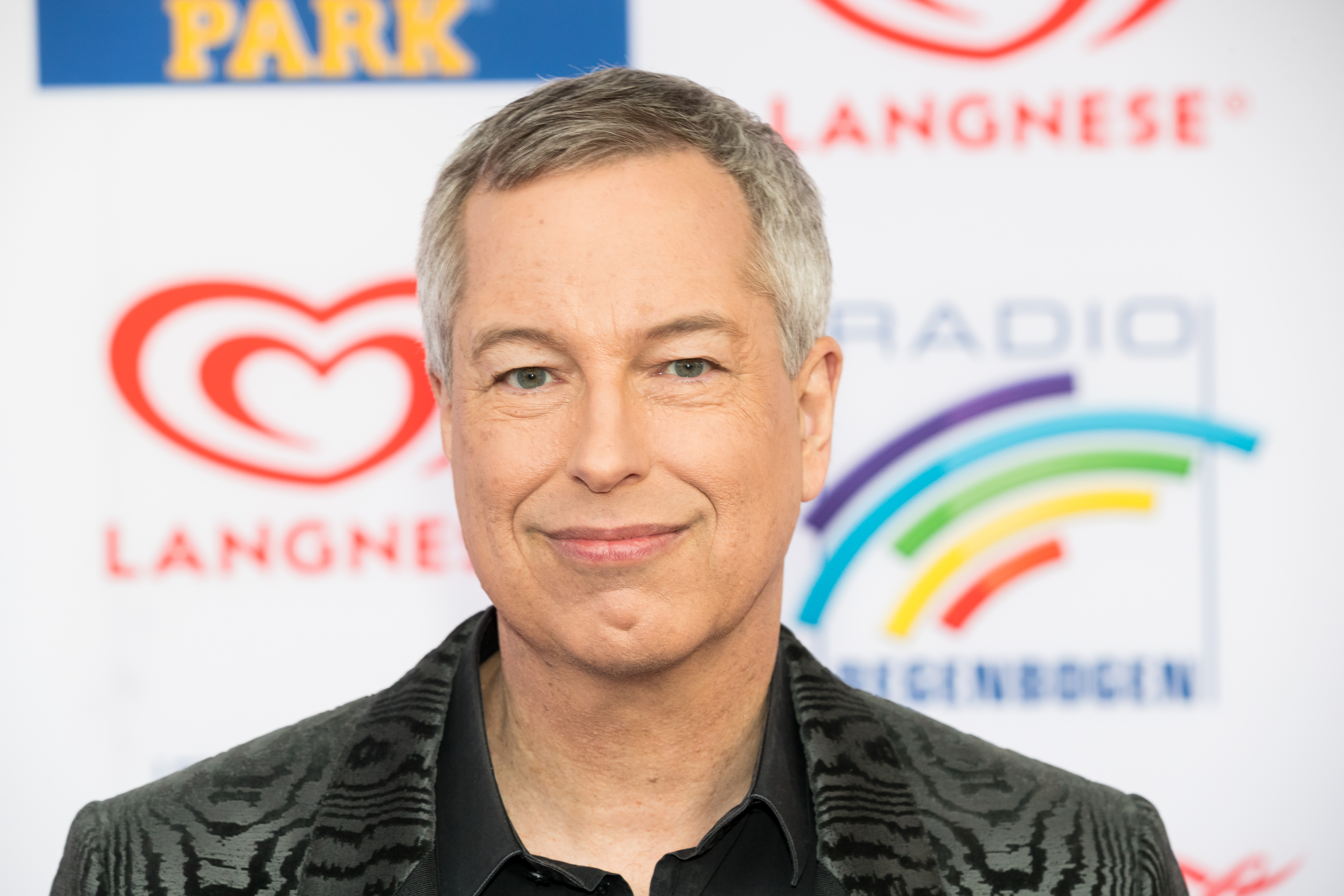
Thomas Hermanns, the presenter of the programme

Die Grand Prix Hitliste – Die schönsten Songs Europas (English: The Grand Prix Hit Parade – The Best Songs of Europe) was a one-off music competition, held by the German broadcaster Norddeutscher Rundfunk (NDR) on 20 May 2006 in Hamburg, Germany, for ARD. Its aim was to determine the best song in the history of the Eurovision Song Contest by means of an opinion poll.

Twenty songs were selected to participate in the competition through an online poll, which included all winners of the Eurovision Song Contest and all German Eurovision entries between 1956 and 2005 (103 in total). During the live broadcast on the television channel Das Erste, "Wild Dances" by Ruslana was chosen as the winner, ahead of well-known Eurovision classics such as "Waterloo" and "Ein bißchen Frieden". The programme was viewed by a television audience of approximately six million people in Germany.

== Participants ==
The top twenty Eurovision acts voted for in an online poll participated in the live show. None of the acts were performed live; videos of their original performances in their respective years were shown to the viewers instead. After all twenty songs had been shown, the German public could vote for their favourite song through televoting or via the online poll. All votes were combined to determine the final results. At the end of the show, "Wild Dances" by Ruslana was announced as the winner, having received a total of 71,209 votes.

Year	Country	Artist	Song	Language	Place	Votes
1960	France	Jacqueline Boyer	"Tom Pillibi"	French	19	6,208
1972	Germany	Mary Roos	"Nur die Liebe läßt uns leben"	German	11	8,423
1972	Luxembourg	Vicky Leandros	"Après toi"	French	3	57,514
1973	Luxembourg	Anne-Marie David	"Tu te reconnaîtras"	French	17	6,278
1974	Sweden	ABBA	"Waterloo"	English	6	21,659
1977	France	Marie Myriam	"L'oiseau et l'enfant"	French	16	6,287
1979	Germany	Dschinghis Khan	"Dschinghis Khan"	German	15	7,321
1981	Germany	Lena Valaitis	"Johnny Blue"	German	9	13,506
1981	United Kingdom	Bucks Fizz	"Making Your Mind Up"	English	8	15,011
1982	Germany	Nicole	"Ein bißchen Frieden"	German	12	8,092
1985	Germany	Wind	"Für alle"	German	13	7,821
1985	Norway	Bobbysocks	"La det swinge"	Norwegian	14	7,420
1986	Belgium	Sandra Kim	"J'aime la vie"	French	18	6,227
1993	Germany	Münchner Freiheit	"Viel zu weit"	German	10	10,225
1998	Israel	Dana International	"Diva"	Hebrew	20	— (Note: The total number of votes cast for "Diva" by Dana International remains unknown to date.)
2003	Turkey	Sertab Erener	"Every Way That I Can"	English	2	63,958
2004	Germany	Max	"Can't Wait Until Tonight"	English, Turkish	5	24,084
2004	Ukraine	Ruslana	"Wild Dances"	English, Ukrainian	1	71,209
2005	Germany	Gracia	"Run & Hide"	English	7	19,157
2005	Greece	Helena Paparizou	"My Number One"	English	4	51,960

== See also ==
- Songs of Europe (1981)
- Congratulations: 50 Years of the Eurovision Song Contest (2005)
- Eurovision Song Contest's Greatest Hits (2015)
- Der kleine Song Contest (2020)
- Eurovision 2020 – das deutsche Finale (2020)
- Eurovision: Come Together (2020)
- Free European Song Contest (2020)
- Sveriges 12:a (2020)
