= Windsong (disambiguation) =

Windsong is an album by John Denver, and its title song.

Windsong or Wind Song may also refer to

== Music ==
- Windsong (band), 1970s London-based
- Windsong International, a record label
- Windstar Records, formerly known as Windsong
- "Wind Song" (Ruslana song), a song by Ruslana
- Wind Songs, a 1996 album by Michael Hoppé and Tim Wheater
- Windsong, a 1971 cello concerto by Paul Chihara

== Other ==
- Wind Song (ship), a yacht owned by Windstar Cruises
- Wind song, a Prince Matchabelli perfume; see Georges V. Matchabelli
