= Northern Song (disambiguation) =

Northern Song may refer to:

- The Song dynasty in China, 960–1127
- Northern Songs, The Beatles' music publishing company
- "Only a Northern Song", a song by The Beatles
- Northern Song (song), a song by Ruslana
- Northern Song, an album by Steve Tibbetts
