= Varvara (singer) =

Russian singer (born 1973)

- Варвара
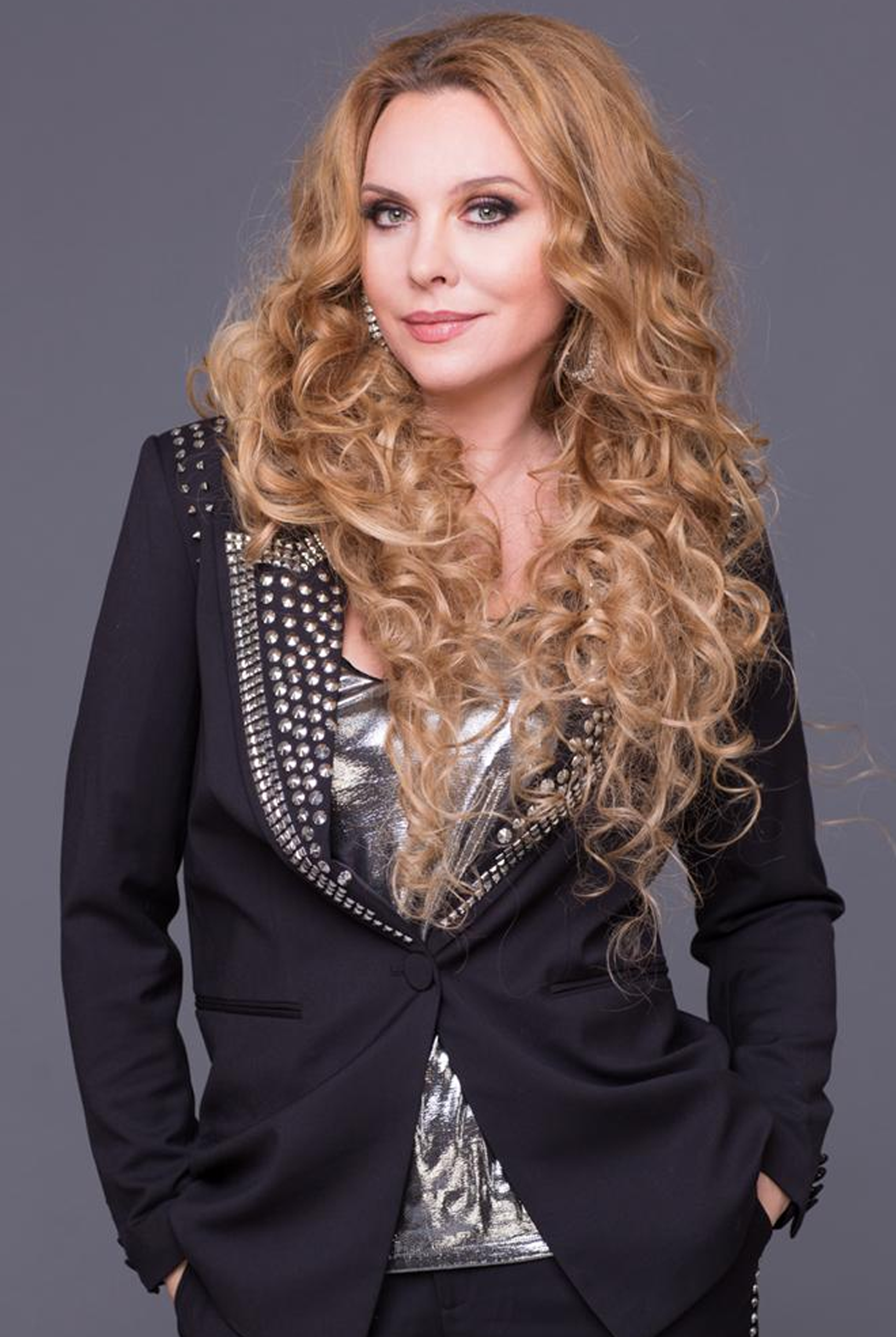
- Varvara in 2018
- Born: Elena Vladimirovna Tutanova; 30 July 1973 (age 53); Balashikha, Russian SSR, Soviet Union
- Other names: Barbara; Elena Susova
- Occupation: Singer
- Years active: 2000–present
- Website: www.varvara-music.ru

Elena Vladimirovna Susova (Russian: Елена Владимировна Сусова; née Tutanova [Тутанова]; born 30 July 1973), known professionally as Varvara (Russian: Варвара; alternatively romanized as Barbara), is a Russian ethno-pop singer.

== Career ==
Varvara was born in Balashikha, Soviet Russia. She began her career in musical theatre, studying at the Gnesinskaya Academy in Odesa, Ukraine, under director Matvei Osherovskiy, where she was repeatedly rejected for record contracts. While working at a theatre under Lev Leshchenko, she graduated from Russian Academy of Theatre Arts GITIS. Having wanted freedom from directors her whole theatre career, Varvara began a solo career.

In 2000, NOX Music signed Varvara, and in 2001 released her debut album, entitled Varvara. The majority of the songs on the album were written by authors who were virtually unknown in the Russian music scene. Varvara's backup musicians were also unknowns, but later became known as "The Varvaras" as Varvara was their only gig.

At the time of Varvara's debut, radio stations were hesitant to play the music, considering the sounds and influences in Varvara's music ranged from Russian to Arab. Despite the hesitation from radios and little airplay, Varvara enjoyed success with songs like "Varvara", "Butterfly", and "Fly to the Light".

In the summer of 2002, Varvara received a proposal from Norm Björn, founder of Swedish Cosmo Studio, to record some songs with the Swedish Symphonic Orchestra. This resulted in the song "Eto Pozadi". The remaining songs that needed to be recorded for Varvara's next album, however, were recorded in Russia.

Varvara travels to the United Arab Emirates frequently with her family. She has also traveled to northern and western Europe. The Celtic influence on Varvara during her travels to Ireland resulted in the song "Two Sides of the Moon" for her second album, Blizhe, which was released in March 2003. Most of the songs for "Blizhe" were recorded at the "Bratia Grimm" studio in Russia, and were released by ARS-Records.

In February 2005, Varvara took part in the Russian national final for the Eurovision Song Contest with the song "Letala Da Pela". She came fourth in the national final.

On October 18, 2005, Varvara released third album, Gryozy ("Dreams") on Grammophone Music, in 2005 which enjoyed much success in Russian. The fifth single "Letala Da Pela" has peaked at number five on the Moscow Airplay Chart and number eight in General Hot 100, as well as becoming her first top 10 single on the Russian Airplay Top Hit 100.

The following year, Varvara sent an entry to C1R for the Russian selection for Eurovision, which was an internal selection. She sent "We'll Be There", the English version of the song "Otpusti Menya Reka". Varvara failed to become Russia's representative.

In 2013 Varvara released another album, titled Legendy Oseni ("Legends of Autumn"). The lead single, "Krasnaya Zhizn" ("Beautiful Life"), was released in June 2006. It peaked at number thirty one on the Top Hit 100 and number twenty five in Weekly Audience Choice.

== Discography ==
=== Albums ===
- Varvara (Варвара, 2001)
- Blizhe (Ближе, 2003)
- Gryozy (Грёзы, 2005)
- Legendy Oseni (Легенды осени, 2013)

== See also ==
- Dva Puti, Dva Shliakhy
