= Ostannie rizdvo 90-kh =

Останнє різдво 90-х

Studio album by Ruslana
- Released: 5 December 1999
- Recorded: 1998–1999
- Length: 50:10
- Label: EMI
- Producer: Ruslana

Ruslana chronology
Мить весни. Дзвінкий вітер (1999)	Останнє різдво 90-х (1999)	Найкраще (2001)

Ostannie rizdvo 90-kh (Ukrainian: Останнє різдво 90-х, Last Christmas of 90's) is an album by the winner of the Eurovision Song Contest 2004, Ruslana, released in 1999. It consists of Christmas carols and other Christmas-related tracks.

== Track listing ==
1. "Чудо із чудес…" / "Алелуя!" ("Miracle of miracles" / "Halleluyah!")
2. "In Excelsis Deo"
3. "Коляда"
4. "Добрий вечір тобі…"
5. "Радуйся, світ!"
6. "Тиха ніч" ("Silent night")
7. Різдвяна тема (live) (Christmas theme (live))
8. інтродукція до фільму "Різдво з Русланою" "Тиха ніч" (live) (Introduction to film "Christmas with Ruslana" "Silent Night" (live))
9. "Чудо із чудес…" / "Алелуя!" (live)
10. "Радуйся, світ!" (instrumental)
11. "Добрий вечір тобі…" (instrumental)
