= Dobryi vechir, tobi... =

Добрий вечір, тобі ...

EP by Ruslana
- Released: 10 February 2003
- Recorded: 2002
- Genres: Pop folk, Christian pop
- Length: 56:27
- Label: EMI
- Producer: Ruslana

Ruslana chronology
Найкраще (2001)	Добрий вечір, тобі ... (2003)	Дикі Танці (2003)

Добрий вечір, тобі ... (Good Evening To You) is a compilation EP by Ruslana, released in 2002. Presented by Ruslana, it features Christmas hits of Ukrainian stars Ruslana, Yevhenia Vlasova, Ani Lorak, Viktor Pavlik, Haydamaky, Oleksandr Ponomariov, and Taras Chubay.

== Track listing ==
1. "Dobryi vechir" (Dmytro Tsyperdiuk version) (Ruslana)
2. "Mykolai Borodatyi" (Taras Chubay)
3. "Syple snih" (Yevhenia Vlasova)
4. "Rizdvo, Rizdvo" (Ani Lorak)
5. "Nova Radist'" (Viktor Pavlik)
6. "Misyats'" (Taisiya Povaliy)
7. "Sviat vechir" (Haydamaky)
8. "Dobryi vechir" (DJ Nekrasov version) (Ruslana)
9. "Raduisya, svit" (Oleksandr Ponomariov)
10. "Utishymosya" (Ruslana, Pikkardiyska Tertsiya, Taras Chubay)
11. "Zyma" (Ani Lorak, Viktor Pavlik, Oleksandr Ponomariov, Ruslana, Taras Chubay)
12. "Tykha Nich" (Ruslana)
13. "Dobryi vechir" (original) (Ruslana)

== Charts ==
Single	Chart	Peak Position
Dobryi vechir, tobi...	Ukraine Top 40	1
Dobryi vechir, tobi...	Euro-Pop-Folk Chart www.mp3.com	1
