= Moon of Dreams =

"Vidlunnia Mriy"

Single by Ruslana featuring T-Pain

from the album Wild Energy
- Released: 3 October 2008 (Germany)
- Studio: Hit Factory Criteria (Miami)
- Genre: Pop, R&B
- Length: 4:14
- Label: Warner
- Songwriters: Ruslana, T-Pain, R. Bokarev, M. Mishensky, O. Ksenofontov, Karina Yasynova
- Producers: Ruslana, T-Pain, Egoworks

Ruslana singles chronology
"The Same Star" (2005)	"Vidlunnia Mriy" (2008)

Ruslana Ukrainian singles chronology
"Dyka Enerhija" (2006)	"Vidlunnya mrij" (2008)	"Vohon' chy lid" (2008)

T-Pain singles chronology
"Cash Flow" (2008)	"Moon of Dreams" (2008)	"Got Money" (2008)

"Vidlunnia Mriy" (Ukrainian: «Відлуння мрій», lit. 'Echo of Dreams') is a song by Ruslana featuring T-Pain, featured on her 2008 studio album Wild Energy. The arrangement and recording were conducted by Ego Works / The Hit Factory Criteria, Miami, United States. The Ukrainian version of the song was released as radio single.

== Music video ==
The music video for "Moon of Dreams", directed by Malkom Jones, was shot simultaneously in Kyiv and Los Angeles. In 4 shooting days, 4 hours of footage are captured. At the same time, fantasy worlds are being created, covered with clouds of surreal colors, rocks and burning glaciers. Two moons transform into two suns. All 164 frames are created in 5 months. To portray fantasy elements, the designers used ten kilos of ice, two tracks of soil and stones, several tons of fuel for special effects and unrestrained extreme imagination and bravery.

Ruslana has said about the video:

This is how you can be if you can love infinitely and wildly”. “Dare to love, dare to believe in your dreams”, calls out Ruslana. According to the plot of Moon of Dreams song and video T-Pain’s character travels [through] space and time, telling the story about the Amazon’s love.

== Chart performance ==
Chart	Peak Position
Poland (Top 50)	41
Romania (Top 100)	77

== Release history ==
Region	Date
Germany	3 October 2008
Iceland	16 October 2008
