= Znayu Ya =

"Znayu Ya (I know)"

Song by Ruslana

from the album Dyki Tantsi
- Released: 2003
- Recorded: Peter Gabriel's studio
- Genre: Pop folk
- Length: 4.39
- Label: EMI
- Songwriter: Ruslana
- Producers: Ruslana, O. Ksenofontov

"Znayu Ya" (Ukrainian: «Знаю я», lit. 'I know') is a song of Ukrainian singer Ruslana released in 2001.

== Music video ==
Znayu Ya(I Know) is a work about Ukrainian Carpathians, the first video clip filmed and arranged for demonstration in modern movie theaters. Personnel of 250 workers. Seven studios in five countries, 4 kilometers of video tape footage, sound by Dolby Digital 5.0 (licensed by Dolby Laboratories, London). Color by DigitalFilmFinland, Helsinki. Record-breaking high budget, many trick effects and much technical equipment. Unique video shooting of Carpathian mountains from helicopter, numerous scenes in Mountains, video fragments of a true Hutsul wedding in ethnic costumes, incredible national color of Hutsul culture. Filming of a concert on a bandstand installed in the middle of a mountain waterfall. shooting of Ruslana on top of a rock (1600 meters above sea-level) with neither a dubbing actor nor assistance.
