= Myt Vesny – Dzvinkyi Viter =

Studio album by Ruslana
- Released: 14 February 1998
- Recorded: 1997–1998
- Genre: Dance-pop
- Length: 70:03
- Label: Luxen Studio
- Producer: Ruslana (Kyiv, Ukraine)

Ruslana chronology
Myt Vesny – Dzvinkyi Viter (1998)	Останнє різдво 90-x (1999)

Мить весни. Дзвінкий вітер (Ukrainian: In an instant of spring. Sonorous wind) (1998) is the debut studio album by Ukrainian singer-songwriter Ruslana. Released on 14 February 1998 in her home country, there are two albums on this CD. "Myt Vesny", the first one, was recorded in the Luxen Studio and "Dzvinkyi Viter", the second one, contains songs performed live by Ruslana.

== Track listing ==
=== Disc 1 : Myt vesny' ===
No.	Title	Writer(s)	Length
1.	"Vesnyana Introduktsiya"	Ruslana	1:31
2.	"Myt Vesny"	Ruslana	5:16
3.	"Svitanok"	Ruslana	3:53
4.	"Svito i tin"	Ruslana	2:56
5.	"Ostannia podorozh"	Ruslana	4:14
6.	"Balada pro pryntsesu"	Ruslana	5:01
7.	"Shchastya"	Ruslana	3:37
8.	"Ty"	Ruslana	4:05
9.	"Tik-Tak kolyskova"	Ruslana	5:07

=== Disc 2 : Dzvinky viter ===
No.	Title	Writer(s)	Length
1.	"Vam i ne snylosja"	Ruslana	2:35
2.	"Ostannja podorozh"	Ruslana	4:42
3.	"Ty (live)"	Ruslana	4:05
4.	"Svitanok (live)"	Ruslana	3:37
5.	"Try tysjachy rokiv tomu"	Ruslana	2:01
6.	"Vtrachenyj raj"	Ruslana	4:21
7.	"Polum'ja doshhu"	Ruslana	3:33
8.	"Luna"	Ruslana	4:42
9.	"Balada pro pryntsesu"	Ruslana	4:20
10.	"Oj, Letily dyki gusy (live)"	Ruslana	3:15

== Charts ==
Album

Country	Chart	Peak
Ukraine	UMKA Album Top 12	2
Ukraine	UMKA Half of the year 2004	2
Ukraine	UMKA Best of 2004	2
Ukraine	UMKA Pop 2005	3
Ukraine	UMKA Half of the year 2005	5
Ukraine	UMKA End of the year 2005	13
Ukraine	UMKA Best of 2005	7
Ukraine	UMKA Best of 2006	30

Singles

Single	Chart	Peak Position
Svitanok	Ukraine Top 40	1
Svitanok	Euro-Pop-Folk Chart www.mp3.com	1
