= Heart on Fire (Ruslana song) =

Song by Ruslana

from the album Wild Energy
- Released: September 2, 2008
- Recorded: USA
- Genre: Pop (original version), Electro (revamped version)
- Length: 3:25 / 3:20
- Label: EMI, Warner Bros. Records
- Songwriters: A. B., Ruslana
- Producers: Ruslana, O. Ksenofontov

Heart on Fire is the name of one of Ruslana's new songs. It was performed at the opening of the Eurovision Song Contest 2005.
