= Dyka Enerhija =

"Дика енергія Wild Energy"

Single by Ruslana

from the album Amazonka
- Released: 18 July 2006 (Ukraine)
- Recorded: May – June 2006
- Genre: Electronica
- Length: 3:24
- Label: Luxen Studios/Comp Music/EMI
- Songwriters: Ruslana, Roman Bokarev, Mikhail Mishensky, Oleksandr Ksenofontov
- Producers: Ruslana, Oleksandr Ksenofontov

Ruslana Ukrainian singles chronology
"Skazhy meni" (2005)	"Дика енергія Wild Energy" (2006)	"Vidlunnia mriy" (2008)

"Dyka Enerhiya" (Ukrainian: «Дика енергія», lit. 'Wild Energy') is the title of Ruslana's single to promote the fantasy book Wild Energy. Lana. The song was released on 18 July.

== Further information ==
In March the book "Wild Energy. Lana" was released in Ukraine. It is a fantasy book, written by Maryna and Serhiy Dyachenko, who were named the best European fantasy writers in 2005. It is inspired by Ruslana, the storyline of the book contains a lot of elements from Ruslana's unique lifestyle. The main character of the story Lana is supposed to become the prototype of Ruslana's new music project. The first music video for this project was released in June, 25 on Ukrainian TV channels. In autumn-winter the English version of the book will be released in Europe. A German version is also planned. The Ukrainian version of the single was presented to journalists on 15 June and went on sale on 18 July.

Ruslana's new project takes us into a future city which experiences a global energy crisis, far more threatening than lack of oil and gas. The inhabitants of the synthetic city are lacking their will for life, their energy of the heart - the "fuel for people".

Starting signal of Ruslana's new project was the presentation of the science fiction novel "Wild Energy. Lana" of Ukrainian authors Serhiy and Maryna Dyachenko in April 2006. The book serves as the basis of the new project. The main character of the novel, Lana, blond-haired and blue-eyed girl from a synthetic city, is dependent on regular energy plug in. One day she decides to get out of this routine and to the world of real life.

Notwithstanding the fiction character of the plot, it contains allegories, relevant for our time. According to Ruslana, a heart energy crisis is very likely to take over our society, if creative initiatives are not developed and supported. Ruslana's Wild Energy Project challenges the cultural degeneration, the "Energy Ice Age" of the present.

The second element, the Wild Energy single and video movie, centers around main character Lana who is desperately trying to get out of the synthetic world and features sequences of amazing trick effects, stunts and flights.

Wild Energy combines the art of music and video production, literature and social commitment in an extraordinary way and will cover the whole creative year of the singer. Gradually singles, videos, album, a future fantasy-show, series of comics, social projects and other elements will be presented.

== English version ==
A new version of the song was released by the EGO WORKS MUSIC studios. It is on the Wild Energy Album

== Track listing ==
Ukrainian version

1. "Dyka Enerhiya"
2. "Dyka Enerhiya" [Instrumental]
3. "Dyka Enerhiya" [Java Remix]
4. "Dyka Enerhiya" [Synthetic]
5. "Dyka Enerhiya" [Wild Mix]

Bonuses on DVD single

1. "Dyka Enerhiya" [TV ad]
2. "Dyka Enerhiya" [Teaser]
3. "Dyka Enerhiya" [the Music Video]
4. "Dyka Enerhiya" [Making Of The Video]
5. "Dyka Enerhiya" [Making Of The Project]
6. "The Box" [Social ad]
7. "The Girls" [Social ad]

== Charts ==
Chart	Peak Position
Ukraine Top 20	1
Ukrainian Airplay	1
UMKA Best sellers Top 12	1
UMKA Best of 2006	22
