= Wind Song =

Single by Ruslana
- Studio: Peter Gabriel's studio
- Genre: Pop
- Label: EMI
- Songwriter: Ruslana
- Producers: Ruslana, O. Ksenofontov

"Wind song" is a popular song by Ruslana (winner of the Eurovision Song Contest 2004). Ruslana performed the song during the Orange revolution in Ukraine.

== Chart performance ==
Song	Chart	Peak Position
"Wind Song" (Electro mix)	UK club chart	1
"Wind Song" (DJ Small & LV Club mix)	Ukrainian Airplay	3
"Wind Song" (Michael Nekrasov Zebra mix)	Ukrainian Airplay	7
"Wind Song" (Electro mix)	European club chart	7
"Wind Song" (Radio remix)	Ukrainian Airplay	17
