= Vohon chy lid =

2008 song by Ruslana

"Vohon chy lid (Vse ne te)"

Single by Ruslana

from the album Amazonka
- Released: June 2008 (Ukraine)
- Studio: Hit Factory Criteria (Miami)
- Genre: Pop
- Length: 2:38
- Label: Warner
- Songwriters: Ruslana, O. Ksenofotov
- Producers: Ruslana, Egoworks

Ruslana Ukrainian singles chronology
"Vidlunnia mriy" (2008)	"Vohon chy lid (Vse ne te)" (2008)	"Silent Angel" (2008)

"Vohon chy lid (Vse ne te)" (Ukrainian: «Вогонь чи лід (Все не те)», lit. 'Fire or Ice') is a pop song recorded by Ukrainian popsinger Ruslana, written by her and Oleksander Ksenofotov and co-produced by Ruslana herself. The song serves as the third single (second radio single) from her March 2008-released Ukrainian album Amazonka (Ukrainian: Амазонка).

The music video for "Vohon chy lid" has been finished and was premiered on the 2 November 2008. A 1-minute teaser video has leaked onto YouTube in mid-September.
