= Ruslana =

Ukrainian singer (born 1973)

- Руслана
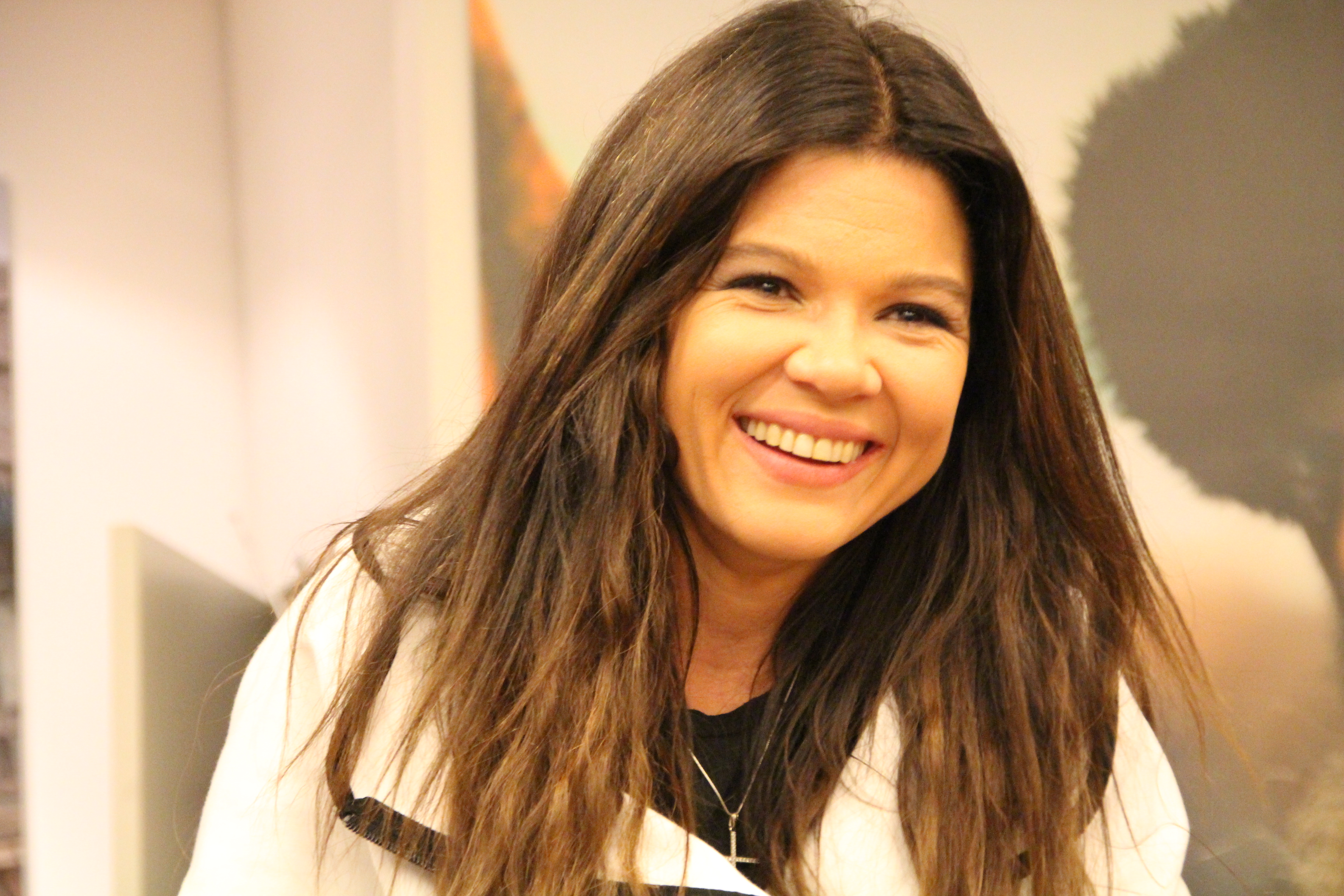
- Ruslana in 2015
- Born: Ruslana Stepanivna Lyzhychko; 24 May 1973 (age 53); Lviv, Ukrainian SSR, Soviet Union
- Occupations: Singer; lyricist; producer; composer; activist; politician; dancer
- Spouse: Oleksandr Ksenofontov (m. 1995)
- Musical career
- Genres: Pop; pop-folk; pop rock; ethnopop
- Instruments: Vocals; piano; guitar; drums; trembita; tambourine
- Years active: 1996–present
- Labels: EMI; Warner Music Group
- Website: www.ruslana.ua

People's Deputy of Ukraine

5th convocation
- In office 25 May 2006 – 23 November 2007
- Constituency: Our Ukraine Party, No.5

Ruslana Stepanivna Lyzhychko (Ukrainian: Руслана Степанівна Лижичко, IPA: [rʊsˈlɑnɐ steˈpɑn⁽ʲ⁾iu̯nɐ lɪˈʒɪtʃko]; born 24 May 1973), known mononymously as Ruslana, is a Ukrainian singer, songwriter, producer, activist and former politician. She is a World Music Award and Eurovision Song Contest 2004 winning recording artist, holding the title of People's Artist of Ukraine. She is also a former MP serving as deputy in the Ukrainian parliament (Verkhovna Rada) for the Our Ukraine Party. Ruslana was the UNICEF Goodwill Ambassador in Ukraine in 2004–2005. She is recognized as the most successful Ukrainian female solo artist internationally and was included in the top 10 most influential women of 2013 by the Forbes magazine. The U.S. Secretary of State honored her with the International Women of Courage Award in March 2014. She has been named an honorary citizen of her hometown Lviv and was nominated to receive the title Hero of Ukraine.

Ruslana writes, composes and produces her own songs and music videos. Since 28 December 1995 she has been married to Oleksandr Ksenofontov, a Ukrainian record producer. Together they have run the company Luxen Studio since 1993, producing radio and film trailers.

Ruslana was the first artist from the former Soviet Union to officially receive a platinum disc, her Dyki tantsi album selling more than 170,000 copies in the first 100 days after its release. This album is the best selling Ukrainian album to date, together with its English version, more than 500,000 copies being sold solely in Ukraine.

She won the Eurovision Song Contest 2004 with the song "Wild Dances" receiving 280 points, which at that time was a record of points. Following her victory, she rose to fame in Europe and became one of the biggest pop stars from the Eastern part of the continent. Her winning song "Wild Dances" dominated the European charts for 97 weeks peaking at number one in Belgium for 10 consecutive weeks. Her Eurovision winning song was included on the official compilation album called The Very Best of Eurovision celebrating the 60th anniversary of the contest.

Her repertoire includes songs performed mainly in Ukrainian and English, but she also recorded cover versions in Spanish and Latin languages.

== Early life ==
Ruslana Stepanivna Lyzhychko was born on 24 May 1973 in Lviv, Ukrainian SSR, Soviet Union. Her father, Stepan Lyzhychko, is a Hutsul Ukrainian, and her mother, Nina Sapegina, is a Russian of Polish-Lithuanian origin.

Encouraged by Nina, Ruslana studied from the age of four at an experimental musical school and sang in different bands, including in the vocal-instrumental band Horizon, the band Orion and the children's ensemble Usmishka (Smile). With Usmishka, Ruslana performed at a large concert in the Druzhba Stadium in 1989. One of the headlining acts of that concert was singer Vasyl Zinkevych, who noticed her talent. At the end of the concert, Zinkevych asked her to come on stage and declared in front of an audience of 15,000 spectators: "Remember this young singer, your compatriot. You will see: she will definitely become a real star." Ruslana's parents divorced in 1991. After finishing secondary school, she entered the Lviv Conservatory, where she graduated as a classical pianist and symphonic orchestra conductor in 1995.

== Musical career ==
=== Early career ===
Ruslana started her career as the winner of the Slavianski Bazaar song competition in Vitebsk, Belarus in 1996 with the song Oj, letili dyki husi. In the same year, she was among the nominees for the Ukrainian Singer of the Year award and the video for Dzvinkyi Viter (Wind Bells) was awarded Music Video of the Year. Since her early career, Ruslana's producer was Oleksandr Ksenofontov, whom she married in 1995.

In 1997, Ruslana began working on Christmas with Ruslana – the first L'viv Christmas television project of an All-Ukrainian scale including the video clip Ballad of a Princess which was the first animated music video made by a Ukrainian singer.

Her first album Myt Vesny – Dzvinkyi Viter (A Moment of Spring – Wind Bells), released in 1998, received high praise from the critics.

Still, wider recognition did not come until 1998 with the song Svitanok (Sunrise) and the album Myt' Vesny – Dzvinkyj Viter Live. Svitanok was the first Ukrainian big-budget music video. In 1998, Ruslana was awarded Person of the Year, the song Svitanok was awarded Song of the Year and its accompanying music video was awarded Music Video of the Year. In the second half of 1998, she organized a charity tour which had the aim of raising funds for the restoration of the old castles from Western Ukraine. The tour was a success and thanks to Ruslana's efforts, the Zolochiv Castle was restored.

In 1999, she worked on the Christmas musical Ostanne rizdvo 90th (The Last Christmas of the 90s), which won the Ukrainian Movie of the Year award. With the video clip to the song Znaju ya (I Know), which is about the ancient people of the Hutsuls living in the Ukrainian Carpathians, Ruslana set new standards for modern video clip filming.

=== Education ===
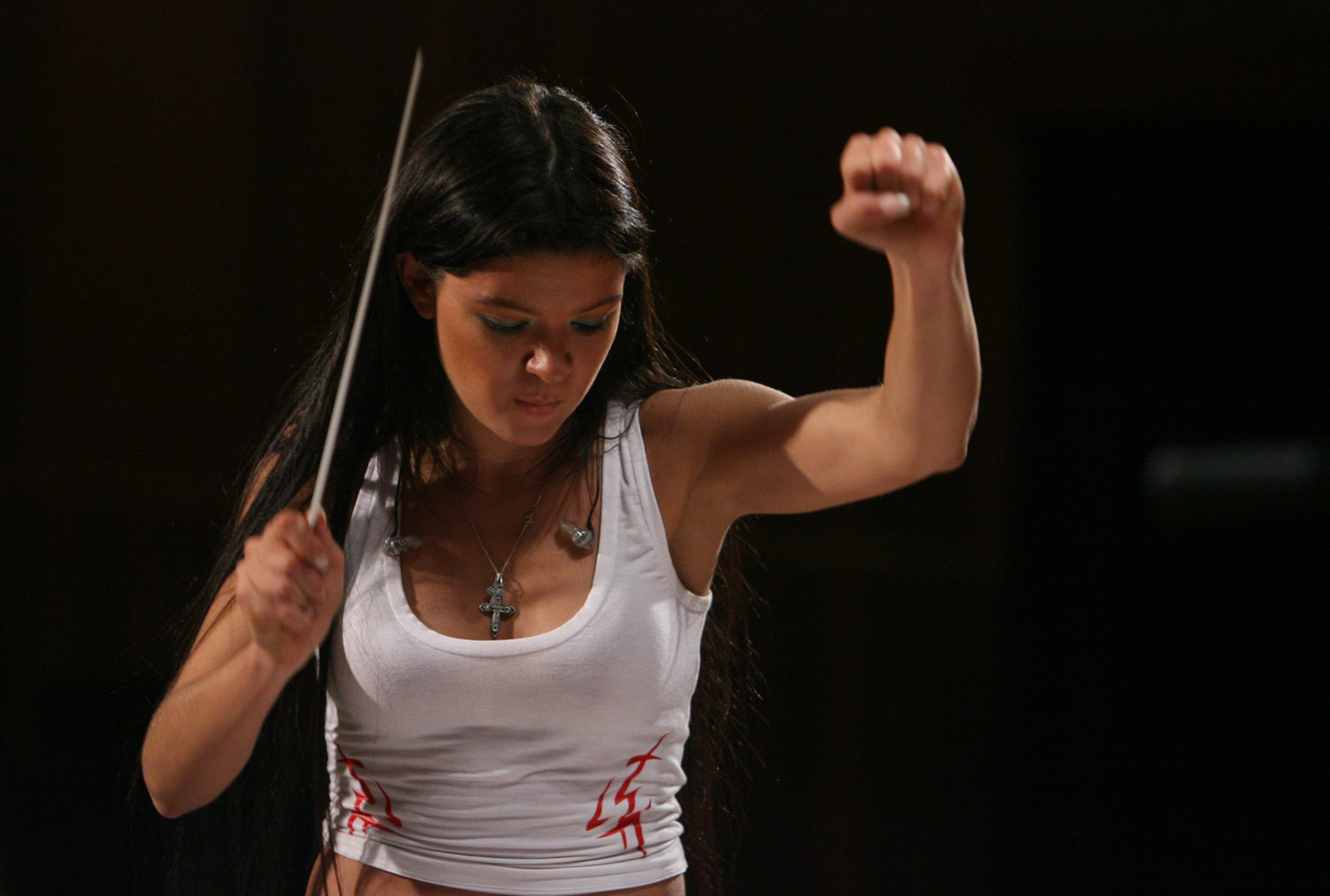
Ruslana conducting a symphony orchestra

In 1995, Ruslana graduated from the Lviv Conservatory as professional conductor and classical pianist. She was the student of one of the most prominent Ukrainian composers and conductors, Mykola Kolessa who is regarded as 'the father of the Ukrainian conducting school'. She used to be a part of the student choir of the Lviv Music Academy.

=== 2004: Wild Dances Project and Eurovision victory ===
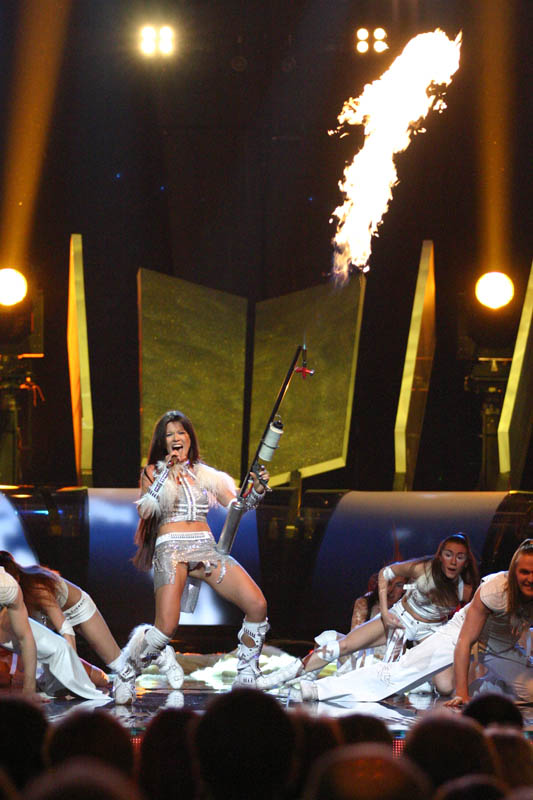
Ruslana performing "Heart on Fire" at the opening of the Eurovision Song Contest 2005.

==== Wild Dances Project ====
Ruslana's father is from the West-Ukrainian area of the Hutsuls, the dwellers of the Ukrainian Carpathian Mountains. They have a unique culture with an ancient and rich history that inspired Ruslana to create her concept album Wild Dances. It combines powerful and permeating ethnic drums, trumpet sounds of the trembita, an ancient Hutsul music instrument, with modern dance beats. The album was composed by Ruslana after an expedition to the Carpathian Mountains in spring 2003.

The album Dyki Tantsi (Wild Dances) was released in June 2003 in Ukraine. The album sold more than 170,000 copies in the first 100 days after its release, even without a supporting tour. Together with its English language counterpart it was the first album ever to be certified five times platinum in Ukraine, selling more than 500,000 copies, making it the most successful album in Ukraine ever.

==== Eurovision Song Contest 2004 ====
Ruslana was internally selected by the NTU to represent Ukraine at the Eurovision Song Contest 2004. Before the contest, she was a hot favorite for victory by the bookmakers. At the Eurovision Song Contest 2004, she performed her self-composed song, Wild Dances and won the contest receiving 280 points. In the semifinal, the song received points from all other participating countries; in the final, Switzerland was the only country not giving any points to the song.

The single Wild Dances stayed a total of 97 weeks in various European single charts. It was certified gold in Belgium, Sweden, Russia, Greece, the Czech Republic and Slovakia. In Belgium, it topped the singles charts at #1 for 10 consecutive weeks. Also in Ukraine and Greece, the song peaked at #1. The English language album Wild Dances was released in many European countries in the autumn of 2004. In Las Vegas she received the World Music Award as best selling Ukrainian artist.

After her victory Ruslana was appointed advisor to the Ukrainian prime minister, and the Ukrainian president bestowed upon her one of the country's highest honors when she received the title of People's Artist of Ukraine.

In Belgium she was among the top 15 ranked performers with her singles "Wild Dances" and "Dance with the Wolves". Ruslana was named the most popular person in Belgium, the sexiest girl in Greece, the most influential public person in Ukraine and was the first foreigner to receive the award of the Federation of Journalists in Turkey.

=== 2005 ===
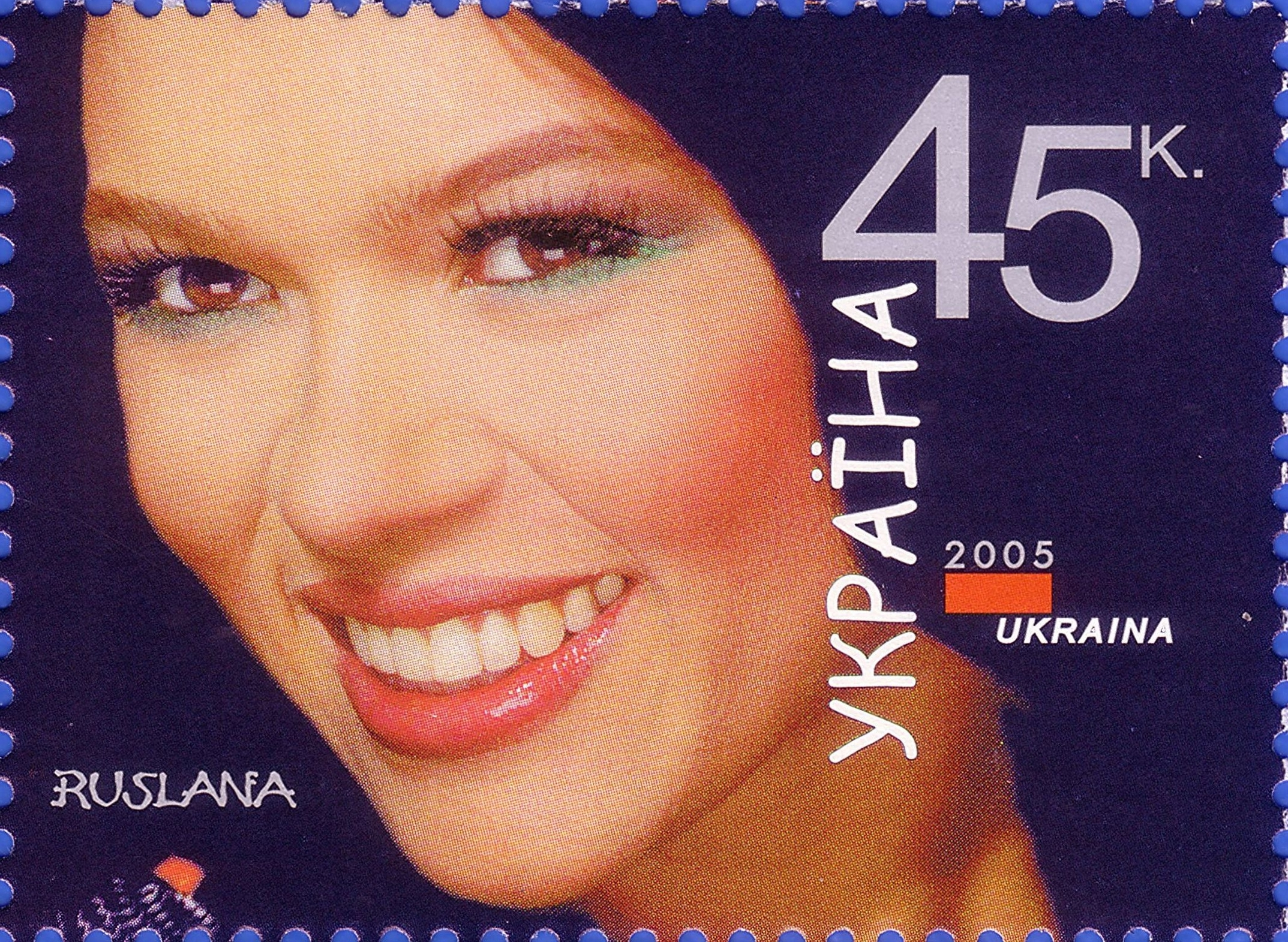
Ukrainian stamp celebrating Ruslana's victory at the Eurovision Song Contest

Ruslana had been initially chosen to host the semi-final and the grand final of the Eurovision Song Contest 2005. However, the singer had to decline the offer due to her involvement in the organization of a big charity concert dedicated to the victims of the Chernobyl disaster. Therefore, Ruslana appeared at the event only as a guest star. She performed a medley of Wild Dances and Heart on Fire at the opening ceremony being accompanied by the Zhyttia ballet and the Ukrainian drums ensemble ARS Nova. After interviewing the competitors in the green room she also performed her latest single The Same Star. During this performance, Ruslana wore a red costume inspired by Ukrainian ethnic elements.

Also in 2005, Ruslana designed the cover for Jonathan Safran Foer's The Unabridged Pocket Book of Lightning which was produced as part of Penguin Books' 70th birthday celebrations.

=== 2006 ===
In 2006, Ruslana's song "Wild Dances" was named Germany's all-time favorite Eurovision entry in an internet poll arranged by the German public television broadcaster NDR. During the television program Die Grand Prix Hitliste, "Wild Dances" was presented as the winner, ahead of well-known classics, such as "Waterloo" and Germany's only winner (at the time), "Ein Bißchen Frieden", which finished in sixth and twelfth place respectively. The programme was viewed by a television audience of approximately six million people in Germany.

For the FIFA World Cup 2006 Ruslana went on tour in Germany to support the Ukraine national football team. She performed in Hamburg, Cologne, Berlin, Leipzig, and Nuremberg.

=== 2008: Wild Energy and Grand Theft Auto IV ===
Ruslana's project Wild Energy was based on the science fiction novel by Maryna and Sergij Diachenko Wild Energy. Lana. In a future city which experiences a global energy crisis, far more threatening than lack of oil and gas, people are lacking their will to live, their energy of the heart – the "fuel for people". Lana, one of the synthetic inhabitants, sets out to find the mystical energy source. After many adventures, she discovers that the wild energy comes from her own heart. Wild Energy combines the art of music and video production, literature and social commitment in an extraordinary way. In June 2006 Ruslana presented the new single and video Wild Energy in a unique fantasy style. In this video clip, the singer develops from a synthetic blonde girl into her wild image.

In March 2008 Ruslana's Ukrainian album Amazonka was released in Ukraine, Czech Republic and Slovakia. The English album Wild Energy was released by Warner Music in Canada and several European countries in autumn 2008.

The album was recorded at the Hit Factory Studio in Miami and contains two collaborations with American Urban superstars T-Pain and Missy Elliott. On this release Ruslana creates her own distinctive technique of incorporating ancient ethnic styles of the Carpathian Mountain people with modern popular music.

In Grand Theft Auto IV, Ruslana lends her voice as the host of Vladivostok FM. Her song "Wild Dances" is featured as one of the songs on Vladivostok. On 13 May 2008, Grand Theft Auto IV broke the Guinness World Records for "Highest grossing video game in 24 hours" and "Highest Revenue Generated by an Entertainment Product in 24 Hours". It sold 3.6 million copies on day one generating $310 million in revenue.

=== 2009–2010: Asia Song Festival & new album recordings ===
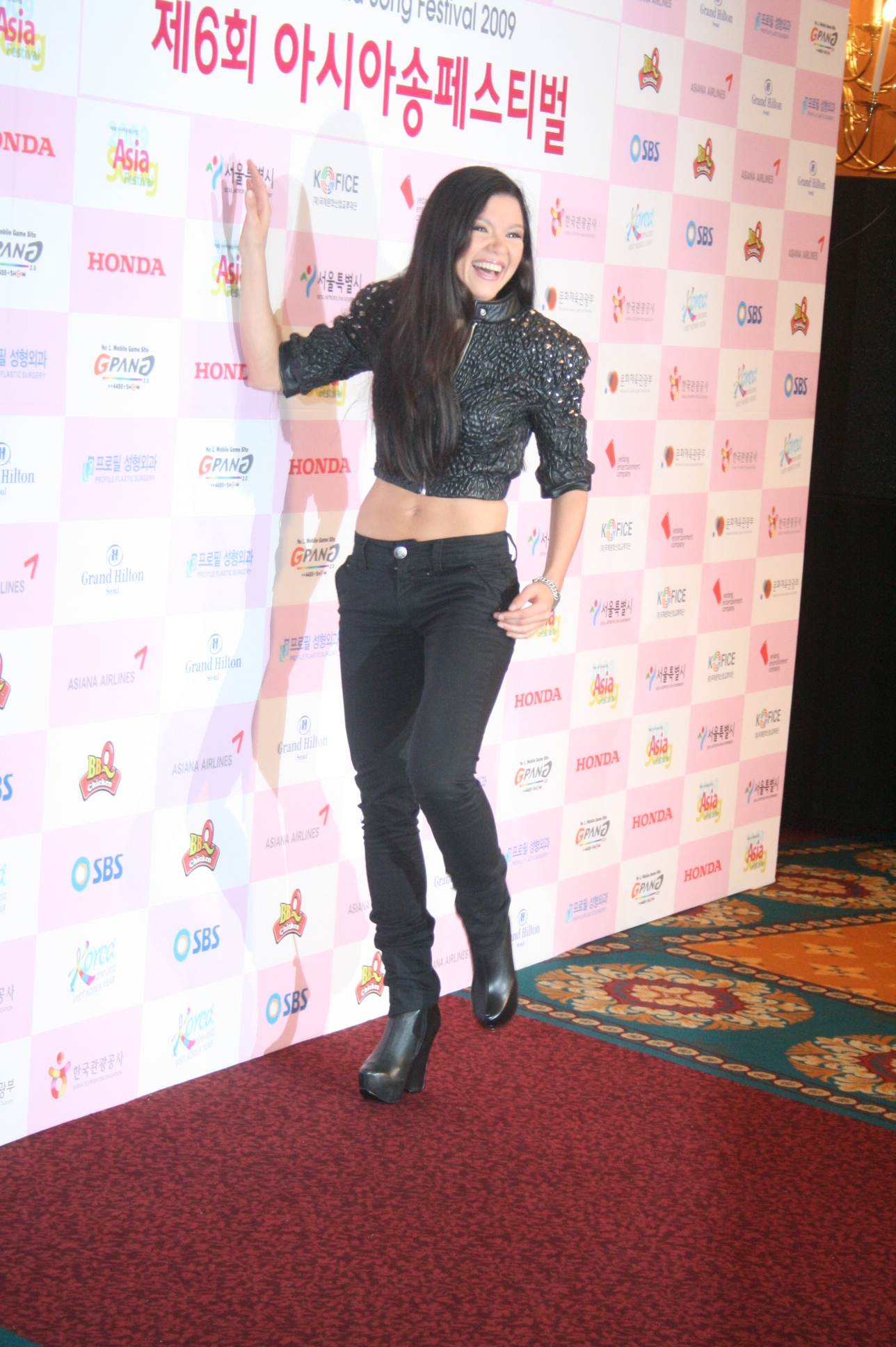
Ruslana on the catwalk of the 2009 Asia Song Festival in Seoul, Korea

In 2009, she was invited to attend the sixth Asia Song Festival which took place in Seoul, Korea. The event was held at the Seoul World Cup Stadium where Ruslana sung in front of an audience of 60,000 people. Together with the Zhyttia ballet, she performed three songs from her first international album: "Wild Dances", "Dance with the Wolves" and a bilingual version of "Play, Musician!". Her act was met with great enthusiasm by the Asian public who didn't know her until that moment. Even if she was supposed to receive only an award for her contribution to the cultural exchange between Ukraine and Asia in music, in the end she also won the main award of the festival, receiving the golden statue for the best artist of the Asia Song Festival 2009.

=== 2011–2012: The Voice of Ukraine and Ukrainian album Ey-fori-YA ===
In 2011, Ruslana was appointed as one of the judges of the Ukrainian version of The Voice show. Her involvement in the project was featured on the Dutch TV where the original show of the series kicked off. Eventually, Ruslana's alumni, Tonya Matvienko, placed 2nd in the grand final of the Ukrainian show.

Also in 2011, her song Wild Dances was used by the American gymnast Jordyn Wieber as the soundtrack for her floor exercise. Wieber eventually became the 2011 World Women's All-Around Champion and won the golden medal at the 2012 Summer Olympics performing her floor exercise on Ruslana's song.

In April 2012 the new Ukrainian language album ЕЙ-форі-Я (EY-fori-YA) was released in Ukraine. The album on which Ruslana had worked for four years was produced in the US, Sweden and Ukraine produced by Vlad Debriansky and Ruslana and features musicians such as Rusty Allen, Victor Little, George Benson, Brian Coller and others.

Despite its intercontinental rock and pop nature, the album EY-fori-YA and the three songs taken from it previously is based on Slavic rhythms. Ruslana integrated old Slavic circle dances, liturgies and elements of classic pieces of Russian composers including Glinka, Tschaikowsky, Mussorgsky, and Rachmaninow. The album is designed for flash mob type synchronous dances. In April/May 2012 she toured 11 Ukrainian cities with a unique show concept called OGO Show. During these open-air events Ruslana appeared as lead dancer teaching the audience the moves. The audience doesn't consume passively, but is integrated into the show. More concept concerts followed within the framework of the EURO 2012 public fan events.

=== 2013: International album My Boo! (Together!) & Clash of the Choirs ===
Her third international album was set to be released in 2013 under the title My Boo! (Together!). The new material shows how versatile Ruslana is as an artist as she completely changed her style since the Wild Energy project, from a wild Amazon to an Urban pop princess.

Most of the album was produced by Vlad DeBriansky in Los Angeles and includes the names of American top musicians such as Rusty Allen, Victor Little, Oscar Seaton, Brian Coller as well as Stefan Örn from Sweden who won the Eurovision Song Contest 2011 as a songwriter. Goran Bregovich, the legendary Balkan musician from Serbia produced the song Kray

At the same time of the release of the new English album Ruslana's Ukrainian album ЕЙ-форі-Я (EY-fori-YA, Euphoria) was re-released under the new title Мій Брат! (разом) (Miy Brat! (razom!), My Brother! (together!)). The renaming of the album had become necessary because of the coincidental same name of the winning song of the Eurovision Song Contest 2012. The Swedish singer Loreen won the event with the song Euphoria, one month after Ruslana had released her Ukrainian album and song of the same name. In order to avoid misunderstandings Ruslana's renamed not only her album but also her English song Euphoria into This Is Euphoria.

In August 2013 Ruslana globally released the single This Is Euphoria digitally. The track was composed and produced by Ruslana and the Swedish musician Stefan Örn.

She was invited to perform at the Junior Eurovision Song Contest 2013 which took place in her country's capital Kyiv. Nevertheless, she withdrew her act from the show considering the violence shown by the Ukrainian authorities against those who were peacefully protesting in the country's capital.

She was one of the coaches of the first season of the Clash of the Choirs TV show in Ukraine. Ruslana and her alumni from the city of Lviv have won the grand final of the project on 5 January 2014, receiving 78% of the tele voting.

=== 2014–2016: Eurovision juror ===
In January 2014 her international album My Boo! (Together!) was released digitally. For her subsequent album Ruslana intended to study again ethnic motifs as she regarded the Wild Dances project as her most creative work. Due to her active involvement in the Euromaidan in Ukraine, Ruslana had to postpone her musical plans.

Ruslana was invited as music expert for Eurosong, the Belgian selection for the Eurovision Song Contest 2014.

On 9 and 10 October Ruslana held two concerts at the Manchester Ukrainian Cultural Centre 'Dnipro'. She originally planned on performing only one show however as the tickets sold out within hours, it was decided that she would perform a second concert the next day. Tickets for that show were also almost sold out.

On 24 October, Ruslana performed a concert along with the Ukrainian Bandurist Chorus in Massey Hall in Toronto. The purpose of the concert was to showcase the beauty and the importance of the Bandura in Ukrainian music and culture. For her final song, Ruslana performed along with the Ukrainian Bandurist Chorus as well as the Zoloti Struny Youth Bandura Ensemble based in Toronto. She was a judge at Vidbir, Ukraine's National Selection for the Eurovision Song Contest 2016. Out of the three jury members, she was the only one who supported the singer Jamala who later on became the second Eurovision winner from Ukraine.

In late 2016, after Jamala's victory at Eurovision in Stockholm, Ruslana played 3 concerts in Western Europe. In October she played in London, in November she played in Paris and in December she played in Hanover (Hannover). In all of these concerts she spoke about the victory that Jamala brought for Ukraine, and how Ukraine would be opening up to the world again in May 2017.

=== 2017: It's Magical / Ya lyublyu ===
After her long-lasting creative break, which was caused by the dramatic and stormy events in Ukraine, Ruslana presented her new single "It's Magical / Я люблю" at the Eurovision Grand Finale in Kyiv on 13 May 2017. The new music style combines tender cradle songs with brisk exotic melodies and rhythms. The original, exotic manner of singing which forms the basis of the soundtrack Ruslana acquired on sometimes extreme expeditions into the Carpathian Mountains. The song was released in an English ("It's Magical") and a Ukrainian version ("Я люблю" / "Ya lyublyu" / "I Love").

The film production took place in a unique place, the Basalt quarry in the Rivne region. Director Oles Sanin created a thunderstorm in a realistic way for the video clip. The image of Ruslana in the chainmail in which she appears in the clip resembles her internal state. After all the events in her country and her extreme expeditions into the mountains, Ruslana feels like a kind of warrioress who is called to protect the most valuable: Love. In her song, video Ruslana wants to draw attention to the widespread deforestation in the Carpathians. Her aim is the preservation of the Carpathian primeval forests, their unique wildlife, and exceptional culture.

== Political activities ==
=== 2004: Orange Revolution ===
In autumn 2004 Ruslana actively supported the democratic processes in Ukraine known as the Orange Revolution, to which her song "Dance with the Wolves" was devoted. She declared her support for Viktor Yushchenko during the disputed Ukrainian presidential elections. She became one of the prominent figures that addressed the mass crowds rallying in support of Yushchenko's demand that his original defeat be declared fraudulent. From spring 2006 to summer 2007 she was a Member of the Ukrainian Parliament for the party Our Ukraine.

Ruslana endorsed Yulia Tymoshenko during the 2010 Ukrainian presidential election and actively supported her candidature during the election campaign.

=== 2012: Campaign against judicial arbitrariness ===
In December 2012 Ruslana launched the human rights campaign Не мовчи (Don't keep silent) which challenges the juridical system of Ukraine. In particular she supports the case of Dmytro and Sergiy Pavlichenko who claim to have been forced to admit a murder they have not committed. The father and son were convicted of killing a judge of a district court in Kyiv and sentenced to life imprisonment and 13 years in prison respectively. The verdict was widely criticized mainly by football fans. Ruslana dedicated her song and video Це – Ей-форі-Я (This is Euphoria) to the case of the Pavlichenkos who according to her are victims of a misjudgement.

=== 2013–2014: Euromaidan ===
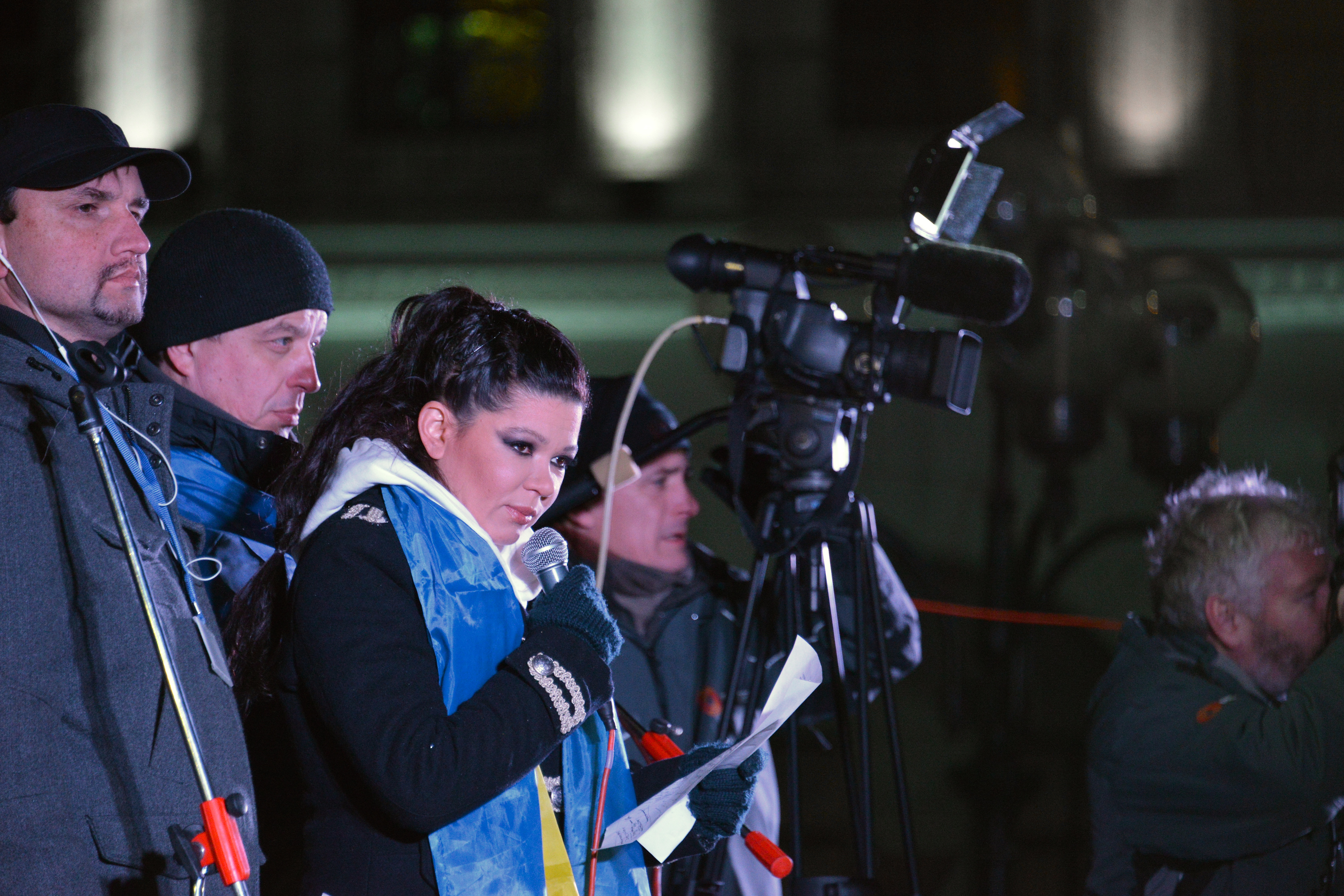
Ruslana reading out an official resolution of Euromaidan, 29 November 2013

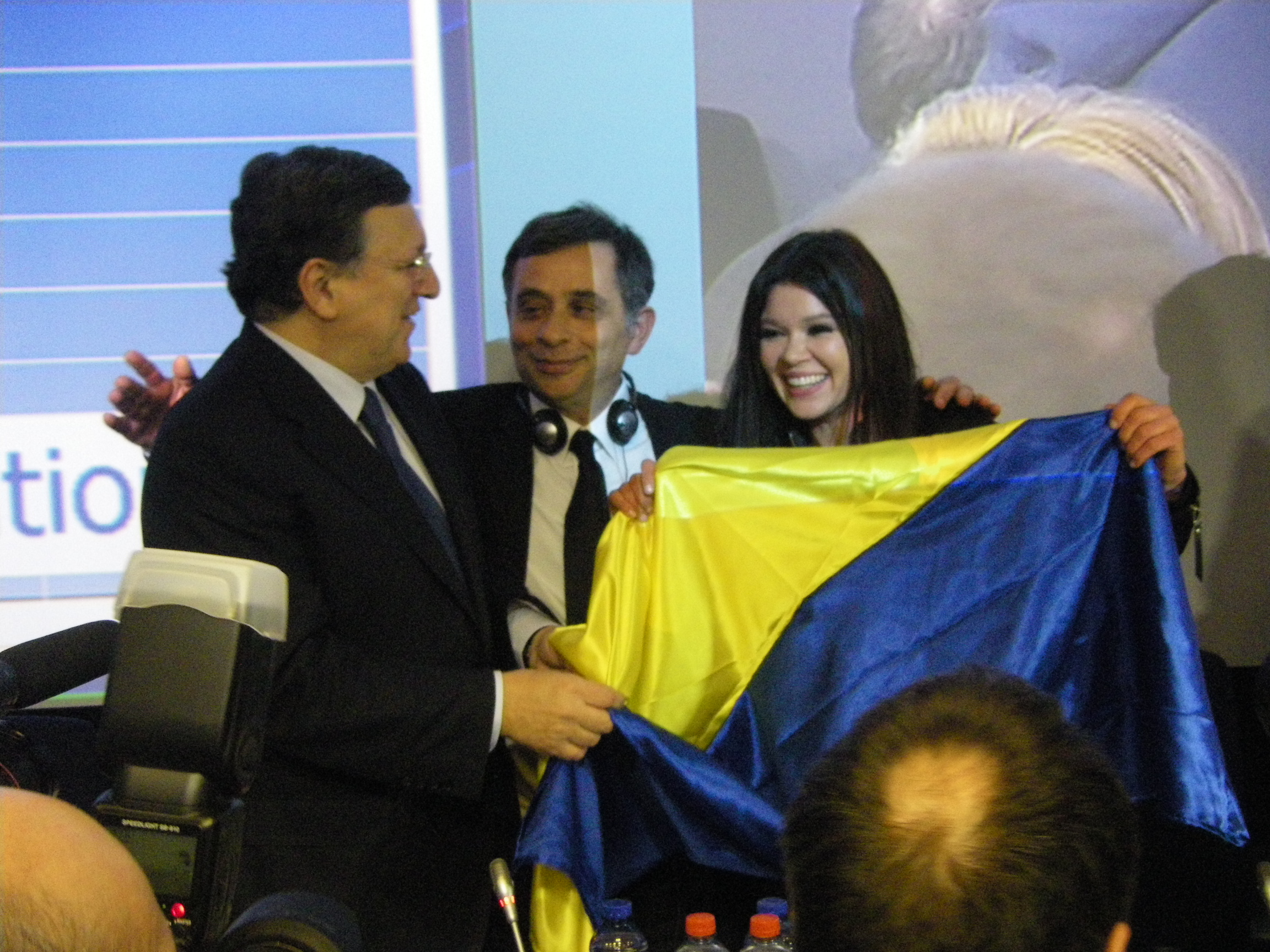
Ruslana with José Manuel Barroso and Henri Malosse at the Plenary Session of the EESC in Brussels

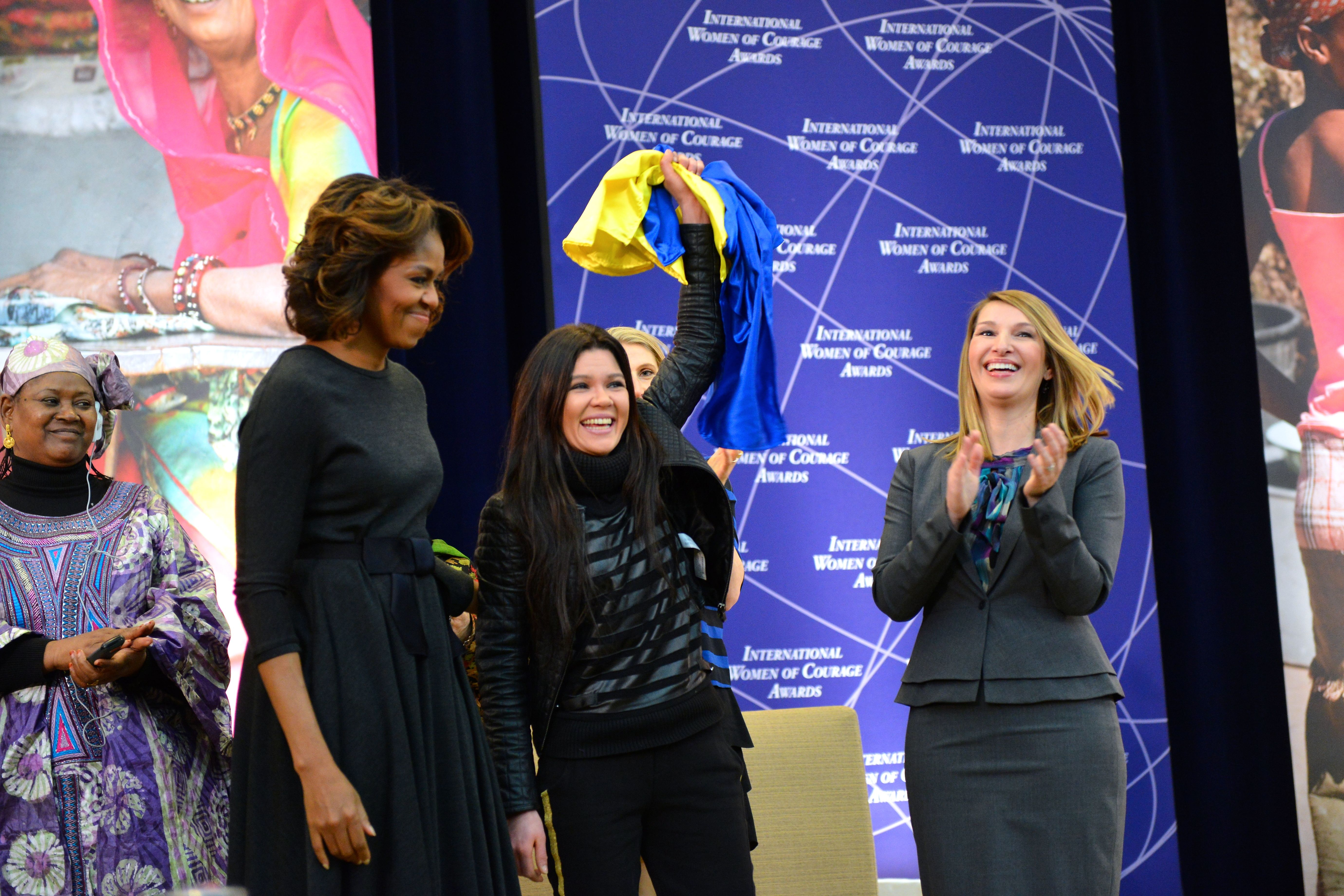
First Lady Michelle Obama and Deputy Secretary Heather Higginbottom pose for a photo with 2014 Secretary of State's International Women of Courage Award Winner Ruslana

Ruslana was one of the leading figures of the pro-EU protests known as Euromaidan. On 22 November 2013, Ukrainian citizens started spontaneous protests in Kyiv, the capital of Ukraine, after the Ukrainian government had suspended preparations for signing an Association Agreement with the European Union.

External videos
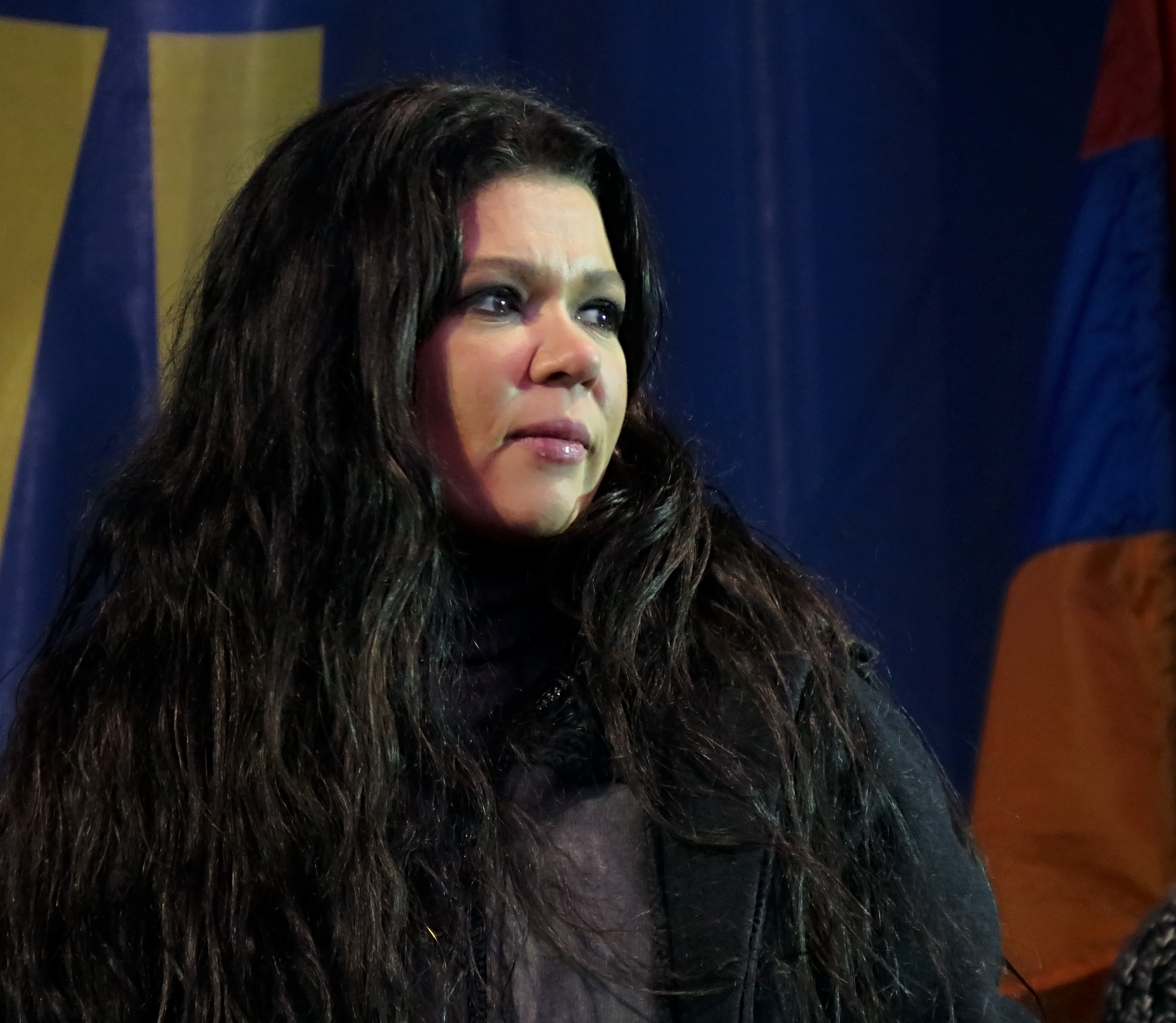
- Ukrainian star & activist Ruslana speaks at the National Press Club, 5 March 2014, 1:09:44

From the first day of the protests she stayed on Kyiv's Maidan Nezalezhnosti virtually all night, up to ten hours a night. In an interview with The Daily Beast on 11 December 2013 she explained her role in the opposition as "charging Maidan with freedom-loving energy", insisted she "hates" politics and denied supporting any single leader.

In total Ruslana spent at least 100 days and 100 nights on the Maidan stage during the cold winter inspiring the crowds, giving speeches and singing the Ukraine national anthem every hour day after day and night after and night, often sleeping just a couple of hours on the floor of the Trade Union building occupied by the protesters. As a symbol of people power, peace and freedom she established holding up flashlights while singing the Ukraine national anthem.

When during the night of 30 November 2013 the riot police wanted to clear the occupied Maidan and started beating up peacefully sleeping activists, Ruslana rushed for help and managed to seek shelter with about 100 students, some of them wounded, in a nearby monastery. During another night in December 2013, when riot police advanced again towards the square, Ruslana did her utmost to deescalate the situation by talking to them from the stage repeating over and over again "Quiet! No violence!". The 2,000+ riot police eventually retreated.

Her commitment in the pro-European movement was featured in many international publications. While the American press regarded her as the 'true heroine of Ukraine', the German magazine Spiegel called her 'Kyiv's queen of the night', and the Spanish newspaper El Mundo compared her to Jeanne d'Arc. The media even compared her to Katniss Everdeen, the heroine of The Hunger Games trilogy. The Russian Forbes magazine included her in the top 10 of the most influential women of 2013 and the Business Ukraine magazine named her 'person of the year'.

From January 2014, Ruslana started to meet with key EU and U.S. politicians asking for support for Ukraine. Her first appearance in this role at the 495th Plenary Session of the European Economic and Social Committee (EESC) and a meeting with José Manuel Barroso, President of the European Commission, resulted in a resolution of the EESC to support the Ukrainian civil society and its democratic rights. In the following months Ruslana travelled to Stockholm, Paris, Warsaw, Brussels, Vienna, Strasbourg, Berlin, Munich, São Paulo, Washington, D.C., and New York speaking to leading government officials calling for international support, and giving interviews to press about the situation in Ukraine.

Her activism put herself in serious danger. She received numerous death threats on her phone, her car was followed and she couldn't live in her house for several weeks because it was constantly observed. Snipers aimed at her while she was standing on the Maidan stage. The threats started after she started demanding sanctions from the EU governments against the Yanukovych government. Ruslana had also noted the presence of paid provocateurs who have instigated fights in the otherwise peaceful protests. After President Viktor Yanukovych had fled the country in late February 2014 and the fights in Ukraine escalated Ruslana targeted Russian President Vladimir Putin as aggressor and demanded sanctions against him and his government. In Washington, D.C., she stated: "Putin's propaganda is a machine against the truth. Putin started his terrorist operation in Eastern Ukraine and is preparing his way to Kyiv. Russia's special forces, terrorist, are invading Ukraine ... Tomorrow we will wake up and see that Putin took away everything he wanted."

For her extraordinary courage, commitment and dedication Ruslana was honoured with several awards including the International Woman of Courage Award, awarded by First Lady Michelle Obama at the Woman in the World Summit in New York and the 2014 Distinguished Humanitarian Leadership Award from at the Atlantic Council in Washington, D.C.

On 24 May 2014, the day before the presidential election in Ukraine which happened to be also her birthday, Ruslana organized a global joint prayer which involved one million people in several countries highlighting the unity of Ukrainians across the world and the global support for Ukraine. Ruslana herself read the prayer "For Ukraine, for peace and quiet" and performed the Ukraine national anthem in 12 languages on Mount Khomyak in the Carpathian Mountains.

=== 2022–present: Russian invasion of Ukraine ===
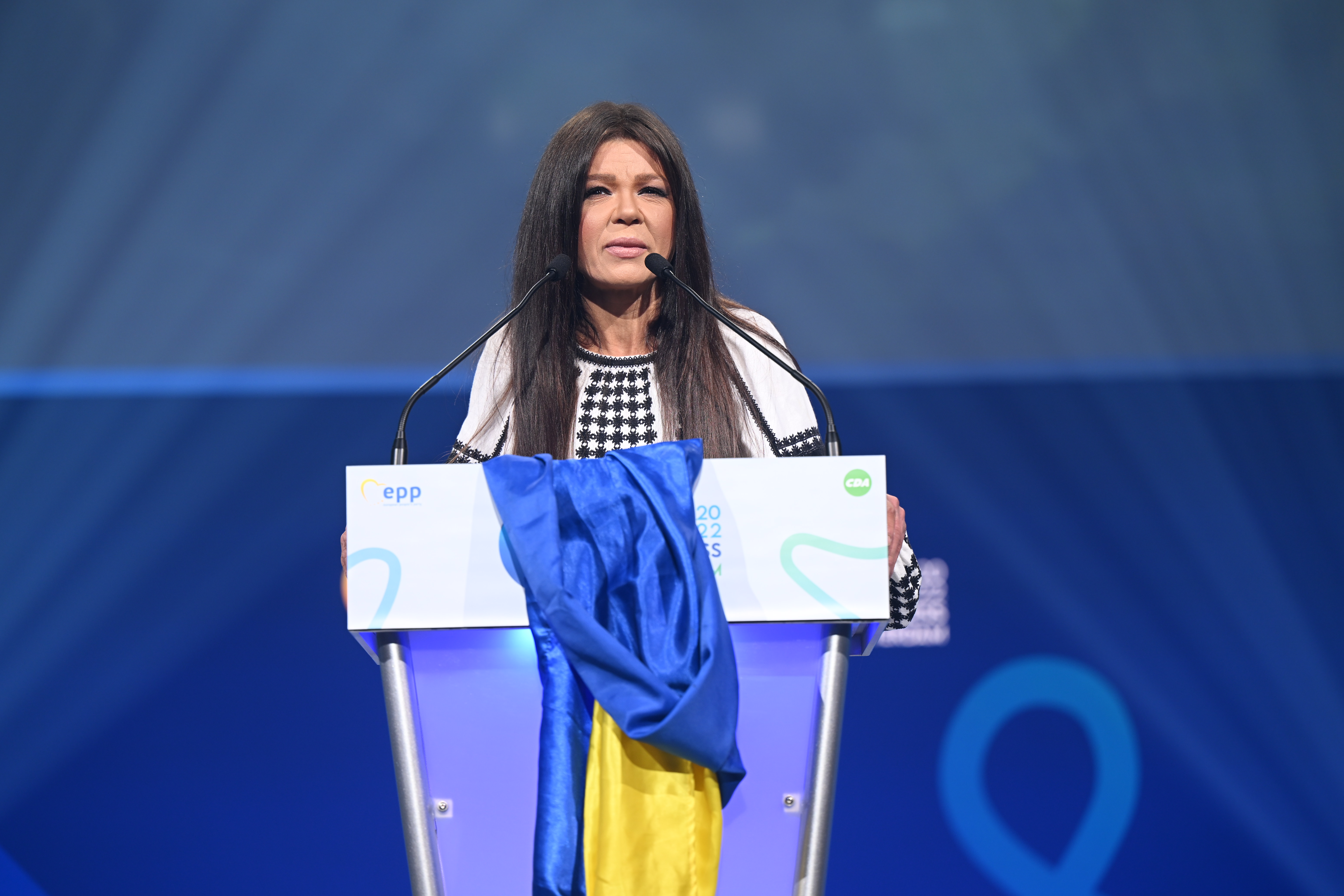
Ruslana, with a Ukrainian flag on the lectern, speaking at the 2022 European People's Party Congress in Rotterdam

After Russia launched a full-scale invasion of Ukraine on 24 February 2022, Ruslana posted a statement on her Instagram account expressing hope that "the world will stand united for Ukraine. We have worked for many years to ensure that the modern world chooses Ukraine as a country that has suffered from the Russian regime for centuries. The world feels us and will help." She also used her profile to share information on how to responsibly coordinate citizen actions such as assisting the Territorial Defence Forces and listening to announcements from official sources.

In May 2022, she spoke at a press conference in Istanbul to lobby Turkish president Recep Tayyip Erdoğan to help Ukraine's citizens. She was joined by the mothers of Ukrainian forces who defended Azovstal Iron and Steel Works during the siege of Mariupol. Ruslana also led a protest against the invasion in Athens in November, where it coalesced with a march for women's rights in Iran.

Ruslana has performed at concerts to raise funds for relief efforts. While such shows in Ukraine were restricted for safety reasons, she held a performance in an underground metro station. In August 2023, she led a concert at Tallinn's Freedom Square to celebrate the Independence Day of Ukraine and the Estonian Restoration of Independence; proceeds from the show went to assist children living near the frontlines and building bomb shelters in the region. Ruslana explained in September 2023 that "music has become quite the weapon during this time of war" by helping to maintain morale.

Her song "I'm Alive", released on 7 March 2022, is dedicated to Ukrainian civilians and troops killed in the Russo-Ukrainian War. At a show in Liverpool to promote the Eurovision Song Contest 2023, Ruslana announced a new studio album that she said was to unite Ukraine and "show [Russia] that we can still make new songs, that we can still create despite the ongoing war."

== Social commitment ==
In 2004 to 2005 Ruslana was appointed Good Will Ambassador of Ukraine by the UNICEF and combats trafficking in human beings. She released two video clips which aim to make potential victims aware of the dangers of human trafficking. In February 2008 Ruslana performed at an anti-human trafficking event in Vienna, Austria, organized by UN.GIFT (The United Nations Global Initiative to Fight Human Trafficking) in front of 117 international delegations. Her song Not for Sale became the anthem of the anti-trafficking campaign.

Within the frames of the Eurovision Song Contest 2005 in Kyiv she gave a charity concert for children suffering from the consequences of the Chernobyl tragedy. For another charity project Ruslana joined forces with German rock star Peter Maffay. In April/May 2007 they went together with artists from 14 countries on a four weeks tour through Germany. The funds gathered benefited children in need.

Ruslana has also staged numerous charity concerts benefiting Children's hospitals in Kyiv, Lviv and Dnipropetrovsk.

With her project Wild Energy Ruslana supports the use of renewable energy. She regards the energy of the sun, the water and the wind as an energy independence. The project gradually developed into this bigger meaning. Ruslana wants to make people aware of the dangers of global climate change. In September 2018, she was appointed as global ambassador for renewable energy by Global100RE.

After large regions in Western Ukraine were hit by a flood in July 2008 Ruslana set up the co-ordinating and relief centre Carpathians. Flood. SOS! 2008. The aim of the centre is to create a database of the people in need, to provide emergency humanitarian help and to collect and distribute donations both from the public and from other Ukrainian artists and sportsmen to support the victims of the flood.

== Discography ==
=== Ukrainian-language studio albums ===
- 1998: Myt' Vesny – Dzvinkyj Viter
- 1999: Ostannie rizdvo 90-kh
- 2001: Najkrashche
- 2002: Dobryi vechir, tobi...
- 2003: Dyki Tantsi
- 2006: Tance s vlky
- 2008: Amazonka
- 2012: Eyforiya
- 2013: Miy Brat! (razom!)

=== English-language studio albums ===
- 2004: Wild Dances
- 2005: Wild. Club'in
- 2008: Wild Energy
- 2013: My Boo (Together!)

=== DVDs ===
- 1998: Rizdvo z Ruslanoju (Christmas With Ruslana)
- 1999: Ostannje Rizdvo 90-h (Last Christmas of the 90's)
- 2002: Rizdvjani Legendy (Christmas Legends)
- 2003: Na Rizdvo do L'vivs'kogo (Christmas with L'vivians)
- 2008: Wild Energy. Amazon. Wild Dances

== Awards and nominations ==
Year	Presenter	Award	Result
1996	Slavianski Bazaar (Belarus)	1st place "Oj, letily dyki gusy"	Won
1999	Person of the Year 1999 (Ukraine)	Person of the year	Won
1999	Person of the Year 1999 (Ukraine)	Best song of the year "Svitanok"	Won
1999	Person of the Year 1999 (Ukraine)	Best video of the year "Svitanok"	Won
2004	Eurovision Song Contest	1st place "Wild Dances"	Won
2004	Marcel Bezençon Awards	Artistic Award "Wild Dances"	Won
2004	World Music Awards (Las Vegas, US)	Best Selling Ukrainian Artist "Wild Dances"	Won
2004	MAD TV Video Music Awards (Greece)	Best International Video "Wild Dances"	Won
2004	Arion Music Awards (Greece)	Best Selling International Single "Wild Dances"	Won
2005	Romanian Most Loved Awards	Most Loved International Singer	Won
2005	Macedonia's The Best 13	Best European Singer	Won
2006	Die Grand Prix Hitliste (Germany)	Best Eurovision song "Wild Dances"	Won
2009	Asia Song Festival	The Special Award	Won
2009	Asia Song Festival	Best Artist	Won
2010	Person of the Year 2010 (Ukraine)	Best solo artist	Won
2011	World Economic Forum	Young Global Leaders Award	Won
2013	Bitva Horiv – Clash of the Choirs Ukraine	1st place	Won
2013	Forbes Russia	Women of the year 2013	Won
2014	Ukrainian Intellectual Society	"Vasyl Stus" Award	Won
2014	U.S. Secretary of State	Woman of Courage Award	Won
2014	Atlantic Council	Distinguished Leadership Award	Won
2014	International Republican Institute	Freedom Award	Won
2014	European Parliament	Sakharov Prize	Nominated
2014	Lech Wałęsa	Lech Wałęsa Prize	Won
2014	Washington Oxi Day Foundation	The Battle of Crete Award	Won
2015	Lev Kopelev Forum	"Lev Kopelev" Prize for Peace and Human Rights	Won

== Music videos ==
- Ty (1998)
- Myt' Vesny (1998)
- Svitanok (1998)
- Balada pro princessu (1998)
- Kolyskova (1998)
- Znaju Ja (2000)
- Proschannya z disko (2001)
- Dobryi vechir, tobi... (2002)
- Kolomyjka (2003)
- Oj, Zagraimy, Muzychenku (2003)
- Wild Dances (2004)
- Dance with the Wolves (2004)
- Ring Dance with the Wolves (2005)
- The Same Star (2005)
- V rytme serdtsa (2005)
- Dyka Enerhija (2006)
- Moon of Dreams (feat. T-Pain) (2008)
- Vohon' chy lid (Vse ne te)(2008)
- Silent Angel (2008)
- Wow (2011)
- Sha-la-la (2011)
- Davaj hraj (2012)
- Tse – Ey-phori-Ya (2012)
- Rachmaninov (2013)
- It's Magical (2017)
- My viter (2020)
- Lirnytsia (2023)
- Iron Beat (2024)

== Filmography ==
=== Television ===
Year	Title	Role	Notes
2000	2000 Today by BBC	Herself	Representative of Ukraine
2004	Eurovision Song Contest 2004	Herself	Ukraine's entry (winner)
2004	World Music Awards 2004	Herself	Guest Star
2005	Melodifestivalen 2005	Herself	Guest Star
2005	Making Your Mind Up 2005	Herself	Guest Star
2005	Eurovision Song Contest 2005	Herself	Guest Star
2009	Asia Song Festival	Herself	Guest Star
2010	Wipeout (BUM, Bytva Ukrayinskyh Mist)	Herself	Participant
2010	True La–La: Three Divas	Herself	Guest Star
2011	Eurovision Song Contest 2011	Herself	Ukrainian Spokesperson
2011	The Secret History of Eurovision	Herself	Guest Star
2011	The Voice of Ukraine	Herself	Coach
2012	Moya pravda / Ruslana. Ukroshcheniye stroptivoy	Herself	Guest Star
2012	MyDance	Herself	Judge
2013	Eurosong 2013: A MAD show	Herself	Guest Star
2013	The Heart of Eurovision with Julia Zemiro	Herself	Guest Star
2013	Clash of the Choirs	Herself	Coach (winner)
2014	Eurosong 2014	Herself	Music expert / Judge
2014	The Charlie Rose Show	Herself	Guest
2016	Ukrainian Eurovision national final 2016	Herself	Judge
2017	Unser Song 2017	Herself	Guest star
2022	Kaukės	Herself	Contestant
2024	The Masked Singer (Belgium)	Herself	Contestant (Zeeduivel)

=== Film ===
Year	Title	Role
2015	Pray for Ukraine	Herself
2015	Kazka staroho melʹnyka (The Tale of the Old Miller)	TBA

=== Video games ===
Year	Title	Role
2008	Grand Theft Auto IV	Herself as the DJ of Vladivostok FM

== See also ==
- Eurovision Song Contest 2004
- Ukraine in the Eurovision Song Contest
- Ruslana's Charity Concert
- Wild Energy. Lana (book)
- Ultratop 50 number-one hits of 2004

Awards and achievements
Preceded by (Turkey) Sertab Erener with "Everyway That I Can"	Winner of the Eurovision Song Contest; 2004	Succeeded by (Greece) Helena Paparizou with "My Number One"
Preceded by (Turkey) Demir Demirkan	Winning composer of the Eurovision Song Contest; 2004	Succeeded by (Greece) Christos Dantis
Preceded by Olexandr with "Hasta la vista"	Ukraine in the Eurovision Song Contest; 2004	Succeeded by GreenJolly with "Razom nas bahato"
Preceded by N/A	Best Ukrainian Act – World Music Awards; 2004	Succeeded by N/A
Preceded by Agnes Monica	Best Artist – Asia song festival 2009	Succeeded by 4Minute
