= Wild Energy (album) =

Studio album by Ruslana
- Released: 2 September 2008
- Studio: The Hit Factory (Miami, Florida)
- Genre: Pop, R&B, dance, pop rock, new wave
- Length: 42:49
- Language: English, Bulgarian (in Bulgarian edition only)
- Label: Warner, EMI
- Producer: Ego Works, Trevor Fletcher, Ruslana, O. Ksenofontov

Ruslana chronology
Amazonka (2008)	Wild Energy (2008)	My Boo! (Together!) (2013)

Singles from Wild Energy
- 1. "Moon of Dreams" Released: April 2008 (radio single); 2. "Silent Angel" Released: December 2008 (promo single)

Wild Energy is Ruslana's second international English album, released in Canada on 2 September and in Europe on 10 October 2008. Recorded at the legendary Hit Factory Criteria Studios in Miami and produced by Ego Works, the album maintains Ruslana's unique musical components blended with modern urban influences. This release contains a first for Ruslana - a collaboration with the American artists T-Pain and Missy Elliott. It combines the elements of music, video production, literature and social commitment. Being dedicated to the idea of the independence of human feelings and freedoms using original and rarely heard ethnic sounds, the music blends these ancient styles and singing traditions of the Carpathian Mountain people with modern popular music.

== Content ==
Ruslana's new project takes the listener into a future city which experiences a global energy crisis, far more threatening than lack of oil and gas. The inhabitants of the synthetic city are lacking their will for life, their energy of the heart - the "fuel for people".

The inspiration for the album was the release of the science fiction novel Wild Energy. Lana by Ukrainian authors Maryna and Serhiy Dyachenko in April 2006.

Notwithstanding the fictional character of the plot, it contains allegories which are relevant to our time. According to Ruslana, a heart energy crisis is very likely to take over our society, if creative initiatives are not developed and supported. Ruslana's Wild Energy Project challenges the cultural degeneration, the "Energy Ice Age" of the present.

The "Wild Energy" single and video center around the main character Lana who is desperately trying to get out of the synthetic world, and feature sequences of trick effects, stunts and flights.

Wild Energy combines the art of music and video production, literature and social commentary, and covers the whole creative year of the singer. Gradually singles, videos, album, a fantasy-show, series of comics, social projects and other elements will be presented.

== Track listing ==
#	Title	Writer(s)	Time
1.	"Wild Energy"	Ruslana, Roman Bokarev, Mikhail Mishensky, Charles Funk	04:00
2.	"Moon of Dreams"(featuring T-Pain)	Ruslana, Roman Bokarev, Mikhail Mishensky, Faheem Najm	04:16
3.	"New Energy Generation"	Ruslana, Roman Bokarev, Mikhail Mishensky	03:24
4.	"The Girl That Rules" (featuring Missy Elliott)	Ruslana, Roman Bokarev, Mikhail Mishensky, Missy Elliott	03:16
5.	"I'll Follow the Night"	Ruslana, Roman Bokarev, Mikhail Mishensky	04:00
6.	"Silent Angel"	Roman Bokarev, Mikhail Mishensky	03:40
7.	"Dancing in the Sky"	Roman Bokarev, Mikhail Mishensky	03:45
8.	"Heaven Never Makes us Fall"	Ruslana, Roman Bokarev, Mikhail Mishensky	03:38
9.	"Cry It Out"	Roman Bokarev, Mikhail Mishensky	03:19
10.	"Overground"	Roman Bokarev, Mikhail Mishensky	03:03
11.	"Heart on Fire"	Ruslana	03:35
12.	"Energy of Love"	Ruslana, Roman Bokarev, Mikhail Mishensky	03:37

== Release history ==
Region	Date	Label	Format
Canada	2 September 2008	Warner Bros. Records	Compact disc, digital download
Poland	29 September 2008	Warner Bros. Records	Compact disc
Ukraine	10 October 2008	EMI	Compact disc
European Union	10 October 2008	Warner Bros. Records, EMI	Compact disc
Switzerland	10 October 2008	Warner Bros. Records	Compact disc
Romania	18 October 2008	EMI	Compact disc
China	November 2008	Warner Bros. Records	Compact disc
United Arab Emirates	2008	EMI	Compact disc
Bulgaria	December 2008	EMI, Animato Music	Compact disc

== Charts ==
Country	Chart	Peak
Ukraine	UMKA Album Top 12	10
Ukraine	UMKA Pop 2008	7
