= Dance with the Wolves =

Single by Ruslana

from the album Wild Dances
- Released: January 2005 (Ukraine)
- Recorded: December 2004
- Genre: Pop rock
- Length: 3:59
- Label: EMI, Liberty
- Songwriter(s): Ruslana Lyzhychko, Roman Bokarev, Mikhail Mshenskiy
- Producer(s): Ruslana; Olexander Ksenofontov

Ruslana singles chronology
"Wild Dances" (2004)	"Dance with the Wolves" (2005)	"The Same Star" (2005)

"Dance with the Wolves" is a song from Ukrainian singer Ruslana’s fifth studio album Wild Dances, and was released on 11 January 2005.

Two music videos were made for the song. During the shootings, Ruslana had to be in a cage with wild wolves. One of the videoclips includes frames shot during the Orange Revolution in which Ruslana took an active participation. The music video for this song is available through the Ruslana fan website.

== More information ==
"Dance with the Wolves" is the first single of the singer to come out in Europe after her Gold single "Wild Dances".

- Produced by Ruslana, Olexander Ksenofontov.
- Directors: Evhen Mytrofanov, Oles' Sanin

While shooting the video, Ruslana and the wolves were not separated by a cage, but a trainer was standing nearby.

== Official remixes and other versions ==
#	Title	Length
1.	"Dance with the Wolves" [Wild Version]	3:59
2.	"Dance with the Wolves" [Pop Version]	3:45
3.	"Ring Dance with the Wolves" [DJ Zebra]	3:59
4.	"Ring Dance with the Wolves" [Ukrainian Radio Edit]	3:18
5.	"Dance with the Wolves" [Club Version] [Harem]	4:18
6.	"Dance with the Wolves" [Club Version] [Treat Brothers]	6:44
7.	"Dance with the Wolves" [Hard Version] [City'sh Mix]	2:36
8.	"Ring Dance with the Wolves" [Club Version] [DJ Zegra]	4:55
9.	"Dance with the Wolves" [Greencash R'N'B Remix] [Max Chorny]	3:30
10.	"Dance with the Wolves" [Instrumental Version]	3:46
11.	"Dance with the Wolves" [A cappella version]	3:35

== Charts ==
Chart	Peak
Belgium (Ultratop 50 Flanders)	19
Europe (Official Top 100)	28
Greece (IFPI)	25
Romania (Airplay Top 100)	95
Russia (Airplay Chart)	105
Ukraine (Airplay)	3

Ring Edition

Chart	Peak
Europe Official Top 100	37
Romanian Top 100	100
Russia Airplay Chart	161
Ukrainian Airplay	1
Ukraine Top 20	1

== Release history ==
Region	Date	Format
Ukraine	11 January 2005	CD single
Germany	7 March 2005	CD single
Netherlands	7 March 2005	CD single
Finland	7 March 2005	CD single
Belgium	7 March 2005	CD single
Sweden	7 March 2005	CD single
Latvia	7 March 2005	CD single
Lithuania	7 March 2005	CD single
Estonia	7 March 2005	CD single
Poland	7 March 2005	CD single
Israel	7 March 2005	CD single
Turkey	7 March 2005	CD single
Czech Republic	7 March 2005	CD single
Slovakia	7 March 2005	CD single
Slovenia	7 March 2005	CD single
United Kingdom	7 March 2005	CD single
