= Wild Dances =

2004 song by Ruslana

Single by Ruslana

from the album Wild Dances
- B-side: "Hutsul Girl"
- Released: 17 May 2004
- Length: 3:00
- Label: EMI
- Composer: Ruslana Lyzhychko
- Lyricists: Oleksandr Ksenofontov; Jamie Maher; Ruslana Lyzhychko; Michael Fayne; Sherena Dugani; Yuliya Rai
- Producers: Oleksandr Ksenofontov; Ruslana Lyzhychko

Ruslana singles chronology
"Kolomyjka" (2003)	"Wild Dances" (2004)	"Dance with the Wolves" (2005)

Music video
- "Wild Dances" on YouTube

Eurovision Song Contest 2004 entry
- Country: Ukraine
- Artist: Ruslana Lyzchicko
- As: Ruslana
- Languages: English, Ukrainian
- Composer: Ruslana Lyzhychko
- Lyricists: Ruslana Lyzhychko; Oleksandr Ksenofontov; Jamie Maher; Michael Fayne; Sherena Dugani

Finals performance
- Semi-final result: 2nd
- Semi-final points: 256
- Final result: 1st
- Final points: 280

Entry chronology
- ◄ "Hasta la vista" (2003)
- "Razom nas bahato" (2005) ►

Official performance video
- "Wild Dance" (Final) on YouTube

"Wild Dances" is a song composed and recorded by Ukrainian singer-songwriter Ruslana, with lyrics by herself, Oleksandr Ksenofontov, Jamie Maher, Michael Fayne, Sherena Dugani and Yuliya Rai. It represented Ukraine in the Eurovision Song Contest 2004, held in Istanbul, resulting in the country's first win at the contest. "Wild Dances" was subsequently released as a single and topped the charts of Flanders and Greece.

== Background ==
=== Conception ===
"Wild Dances" was composed and recorded by Ruslana, with lyrics by herself, Oleksandr Ksenofontov, Jamie Maher, Michael Fayne, and Sherena Dugani. The work on the song lasted for about three months. Editing and sound engineering was done by Ruslana together with specialists from Kyiv, London, and New York City. The recording was done together with a guitarist from Cool Before, and an ex-trumpet player from Zdob și Zdub. The Ukrainian and English lyrics of the song, as well as the chorus and melody, underwent significant changes since the initial stage. She released a Ukrainian-only version called "Dyki tantsi" (Ukrainian: "Дикі танці") only in Ukraine and Russia.

=== Selection ===
On 23 January 2004, the National Television Company of Ukraine (NTU) announced that it had internally selected Ruslana as its performer for the 49th edition of the Eurovision Song Contest. On 28 January 2004, NTU announced that "Wild Dances" would be the Ukrainian entry for Eurovision.

=== Music video ===
The official music video was filmed in the abandoned building of the Ice Palace, which was at once renamed "The Iceberg Palace" by the members of Ruslana's crew because no heating equipment brought with Ruslana could heat the cold air of the huge building to a comfortable level. The building was 'decorated' with sheer concrete and windows without glass. Despite the script of the video-clip, which provided for constant burning fire in large barrels, torches on the stage, wireworks and even a real military flame thrower, only the "Wild Dances" could help people to ultimately warm up. It was first aired on 6 May 2004 on MTV Russia in the 12 Angry Viewers show, but was booed by the audience.

=== Eurovision ===
On 12 May 2004, the semi-final for the Eurovision Song Contest was held at the Abdi İpekçi Arena in Istanbul hosted by the Turkish Radio and Television Corporation (TRT), and broadcast live throughout the continent. As Ukraine had not finished in the top 10 at the previous contest, the song had to compete in the semi-final. Ruslana performed "Wild Dances" eleventh on the night, following Greece's "Shake It" by Sakis Rouvas and preceding Lithuania's "What's Happened to Your Love" by Linas and Simona. The song qualified for the grand final. After the grand final it was revealed that it had received in the semi-final 256 points, placing second in a field of twenty-two.

Mistakenly, the song title was captioned on screen at the contest as being "Wild Dance", without the S, both in semi final and grand final.

On 14 May 2004, the grand final for the Eurovision Song Contest was held. Ruslana performed again "Wild Dances" tenth on the night, following Albania's "The Image of You" by Anjeza Shahini and preceding Croatia's "You Are the Only One" by Ivan Mikulić. Her performance is memorable for an energetic performance, which Ruslana gave in a leather outfit, inspired by Xena: Warrior Princess and the ethnic tradition of Ukraine.

At the close of voting of the grand final, it had received 280 points, winning the contest. It was the first victory for Ukraine. With a mixture of English and Ukrainian lyrics, "Wild Dances" was also the first Eurovision-winning song to be sung at least partly in a language other than English since the rule-change of 1999, when countries were allowed to sing in a language of their choosing, rather than one of their official languages. With this win, Ukraine became the third post-Soviet country to win the contest, after Estonia and Latvia.

=== Aftermath ===
The single was included on the official compilation album called The Very Best of Eurovision celebrating the 60th anniversary of the contest.

As the winning broadcaster, the European Broadcasting Union (EBU) gave NTU the responsibility to host the following edition of the Eurovision Song Contest. The grand final held on 21 May 2005, opened with Ruslana performing a medley of "Wild Dances" and "Heart on Fire" accompanied by the Zhyttia ballet and the Ukrainian drums ensemble ARS Nova. She also performed her latest single "The Same Star" in the interval act and presented the trophy to the winner.

== Charts ==
=== Weekly charts ===
Chart (2004–2005)	Peak position
Austria (Ö3 Austria Top 40)	43
Belgium (Ultratop 50 Flanders)	1
Belgium (Ultratop 50 Wallonia)	25
CIS Airplay (TopHit)	38
Croatia International Airplay (HRT)	1
Finland (Suomen virallinen lista)	20
Germany (GfK)	40
Greece (IFPI)	1
Ireland (IRMA)	44
Netherlands (Dutch Top 40)	25
Netherlands (Single Top 100)	30
Romania (Romanian Top 100)	44
Sweden (Sverigetopplistan)	8
Switzerland (Schweizer Hitparade)	24
Turkey (Turkish Singles Chart)	19
UK Singles (Official Charts)	47

=== Year-end charts ===
Chart (2004)	Position
Belgium (Ultratop 50 Flanders)	3
Sweden (Hitlistan)	43

=== Sales and certifications ===
Region	Certification	Certified units/sales
Belgium (BRMA)	Gold	25,000^{*}
Greece (IFPI Greece)	Gold	
Romania	Gold	
^{*} Sales figures based on certification alone.

== Release history ==
Region	Date	Format
Ukraine	17 May 2004	CD single
Germany	24 May 2004	CD single
Greece	24 May 2004	CD single
Netherlands	24 May 2004	CD single
Finland	24 May 2004	CD single
Belgium	24 May 2004	CD single
Sweden	24 May 2004	CD single
Latvia	24 May 2004	CD single
Lithuania	24 May 2004	CD single
Estonia	24 May 2004	CD single
Poland	24 May 2004	CD single
Israel	24 May 2004	CD single
Turkey	24 May 2004	CD single
Czech Republic	24 May 2004	CD single
Slovakia	24 May 2004	CD single
Slovenia	24 May 2004	CD single
United Kingdom	24 May 2004	CD single
United States	29 April 2008	Digital download

== Legacy ==
The song was bought with exclusive copyright in Vietnam by Vietnamese singer-songwriter Hồ Quỳnh Hương. She has an own Vietnamese version of the song, entitled "Vũ điệu hoang dã".

=== In other media ===
The song is used in the soundtrack of the 2008 video game Grand Theft Auto IV. American gymnast and 2011 world champion Jordyn Wieber has revealed that she uses this song as her floor exercise music.

Preceded by "Everyway That I Can" by Sertab Erener	Eurovision Song Contest winners 2004	Succeeded by "My Number One" by Helena Paparizou
