= Dyki Tantsi =

Дикі танці

Studio album by Ruslana
- Released: June 10, 2003 (Ukraine); January 27, 2004 (Russia); August 16, 2004 (Czech Republic, Slovakia)
- Recorded: 2001–2003
- Genre: Ethno-pop; Dance-pop
- Length: 37:54
- Language: Ukrainian
- Label: EMI
- Producer: Ruslana; Oleksandr Ksenofontov

Ruslana chronology
Добрий вечір, тобі ... (2002)	Дикі танці (2003)	Wild Dances (2004)

"Dyki Tantsi" (Ukrainian: Дикі танці, lit. 'Wild Dances') is the fourth studio album by Ukrainian singer-songwriter Ruslana. It was released on June 10, 2003. Some of the songs featured in this album are also featured on Wild Dances, after she won the 2004 Eurovision Song Contest.

== Track listing ==
Dyki Tantsi – Standard edition
No.	Title	Writer(s)	Producer(s)	Length
1.	"Oy zahray'me, muzicenku"	Ruslana; Oleksandr Ksenofontov	Ksenofontov	3:53
2.	"Znayu ya"	Ruslana; Ksenofontov	Ksenofontov	3:09
3.	"Ples"	Ruslana; Ksenofontov; Andriy Babkin	Ksenofontov	3:30
4.	"Arkan"	Ruslana; Ksenofontov	Ruslana; Ksenofontov	3:39
5.	"Skazhy meni"	Ruslana; Ksenofontov; Andriy Kuzmenko	Ruslana; Ksenofontov	4:12
6.	"Kolomyika"	Ruslana; Ksenofontov	Ruslana; Ksenofontov	4:06
7.	"Hutsulka"	Ruslana; Ksenofontov; Andriy Babkin	Ksenofontov	3:52
8.	"Pivnichna"	Ruslana; Ksenofontov; Yulia Mishchenko	Ksenofontov	3:51
9.	"Tse – lyubov"	Ruslana; Ksenofontov	Ksenofontov	4:03
10.	"Ya tebe lyublu"	Ruslana; Ksenofontov	Ksenofontov	3:39
Total length:				37:54

Dyki Tantsi – Enhanced disc (bonus track)
No.	Title	Length
11.	"Znayu ya" (Remix)	2:52
12.	"Znayu ya" (Mega-Video)
Total length:		40:46

Dyki Tantsi – Russian edition
No.	Title	Writer(s)	Producer(s)	Length
11.	"Wild Dances"	Ruslana; Ksenofontov; Jamie Maher; Michael Fayne; Sherena Dugani	Ruslana; Ksenofontov	3:00
Total length:				40:54

Dyki Tantsi – Czech edition
No.	Title	Length
11.	"Znayu ya" (Remix)	2:52
12.	"Wild Dances"	3:00
Total length:		43:46

Dyki Tantsi – Eurobonus edition
No.	Title	Length
11.	"Oy zahray'me, muzicenku" (Deep Mix)	3:56
12.	"Skazhy meni" (House Remix)	3:42
13.	"Arkan" (New Wave Mix)	3:20
14.	"Kolomyika" (Disco House Remix)	2:50
15.	"Skazhy meni" (Hard&Phatt Edition)	4:34
16.	"Arkan" (Euro House Remix)	3:24
17.	"Oy zahray'me, muzicenku" ("Wild Dance" Edition)	3:55
18.	"Dyki Tantsi" (Instrumental Version of Euro Song Contest)	3:00
Total length:		66:35

== Charts ==
Country	Peak
Ukraine (UMKA)	1
Czech Republic (IFPI)	9
Russian Albums (NFPF)	1

== Certifications ==
Certifications for Dyki Tantsi
Region	Certification	Certified units/sales
Ukraine	Platinum	100,000

== Release history ==
Region	Date	Label	Format	Catalog #
Ukraine	June 10, 2003	EMI	Compact disc	571612 2
Russia	January 27, 2004	EMI	Compact disc	GL 10398
Czech Republic	August 16, 2004	EMI	Compact disc	7243 8 66183 2 0
Slovakia	August 16, 2004	EMI	Compact disc	–
