= Wild Dances (album) =

Studio album by Ruslana
- Released: 6 July 2004
- Recorded: 2003/2004
- Genres: Folk, Pop, Ethnic
- Length: 52:07 (basic album); 55:12 (Welcome to My Wild World); 48:43 (Christmas edition); 52:02 (New Year edition)
- Label: EMI
- Producers: Goatboy, Ruslana, Oleksandr Ksenofontov

Ruslana chronology
Дикі Танці (2003)	Wild Dances (2004)	Club'in (2005)

Alternative cover
- Romanian release artwork

Singles from Wild Dances
- 1. "Wild Dances" Released: 2004; 2. "Dance with the Wolves" Released: January 2005; 3. "The Same Star" Released: May 2005

Professional ratings
Review scores
Source	Rating
Allmusic	?
Amazon.com	?

Wild Dances is the fifth studio album by Ukrainian singer-songwriter Ruslana. It was released on July 6, 2004. The album has been certified 7× platinum in Ukraine, selling 700,000 copies and Platinum in Slovakia.

== Track listing ==
Basic album

#	Title	Writers	Time
1.	"Wild Dances"	Ruslana, Oleksandr Ksenofontov	3:00
2.	"Dance with the Wolves"	Ruslana, Roman Bokarev, Mikhail Mishensky	3:57
3.	"Accordion Intro"	Ruslana	1:00
4.	"The Same Star"	Ruslana, Oleksandr Ksenofontov, Roman Bokarev, Mikhail Mishensky, Steve Balsamo	4:19
5.	"Play, Musician"	Ruslana, Oleksandr Ksenofonotv	3:53
6.	"Like a Hurricane"	Ruslana, Jamie Maher, Sherena Dugani, Fayney	2:36
7.	"The Tango We Used To Dance"	Ruslana, Roman Bokarev, Mikhail Misensky	3:45
8.	"Wild Dances [Harem's club mix]"	Ruslana, Oleksandr Ksenofontov	3:16
9.	"Wild Dances [part II]"	Ruslana, Oleksandr Ksenofontov, Roman Bokarev, Mikhail Mishensky	3:59
10.	"Wild Passion"	Roman Bokarev, Mikhail Misensky	4:00
11.	"Arkan"	Ruslana, Oleksandr Ksenofontov	3:40
12.	"Kolomyjka"	Ruslana, Oleksandr Ksenofontov	4:02
13.	"Hutsul Girl"	Ruslana, Oleksandr Ksenofontov	3:55
14.	"Play, Musician [deep mix]"	Ruslana, Oleksandr Ksenofontov	4:00
15.	"Wild Dances [Harem's percussion mix]"	Ruslana, Oleksandr Ksenofontov	2:52

Wild Dances (New Year/Christmas Edition) (21 February 2005)

The album is the 2005 English version of Wild Dances. The Christmas Edition has festive design, bonus tracks and includes a poster with a calendar for the year 2006.

1. Wild Dances (Victory Dance) – 3:00
2. Dance with the Wolves (Extreme Dance) – 3:57
3. Accordion Intro (Ethno Dance) – 1:00
4. The Same Star (Night Dance) – 4:19
5. Play, Musician (Joy Dance) – 3:53
6. Like a Hurricane (Drive Dance) – 2:36
7. Tango We Used to Dance (Love Dance) – 3:45
8. Wild Dances [Part 2] (Sympho Dance) – 3:59
9. Wild Passion (Molfar Dance) – 4:00
10. Wild Dances [Harem's Percussion Mix] (Thanks to Turkey) – 2:52
11. Ring Dance with the Wolves [Bonus track] – 3:51
12. Wild Dances [C.Y.T. vs DJ Nick 2005 (Club Edit)] [Bonus track] – 4:10
13. The Same Star [DJ Small & LV Club Mix] [Bonus track] – 6:45

== Personnel ==
- Vadim Chislov – Assistant Engineer
- Goatboy – Producer
- Harem – Percussion
- Marco Migliari – Mixing
- Andrei Petrov – Photography
- Ruslana — Arranger, Vocals (background), producer, engineer, Mixing
- Ryan Smith – Mastering

== Charts ==
Country	Peak
Ukraine (UMKA)	1
Czech Republic (IFPI)	9
Belgium Flanders (Ultratop)	59

== Certifications and sales ==
Region	Certification	Certified units/sales
Slovakia	Platinum	
Ukraine	7× Platinum	700,000
Summaries
Worldwide	—	1,000,000

== See also ==
- List of best-selling albums by country
