= Oleksandr Ksenofontov =

Ukrainian record producer and lyricist

- Олександр Ксенофонтов
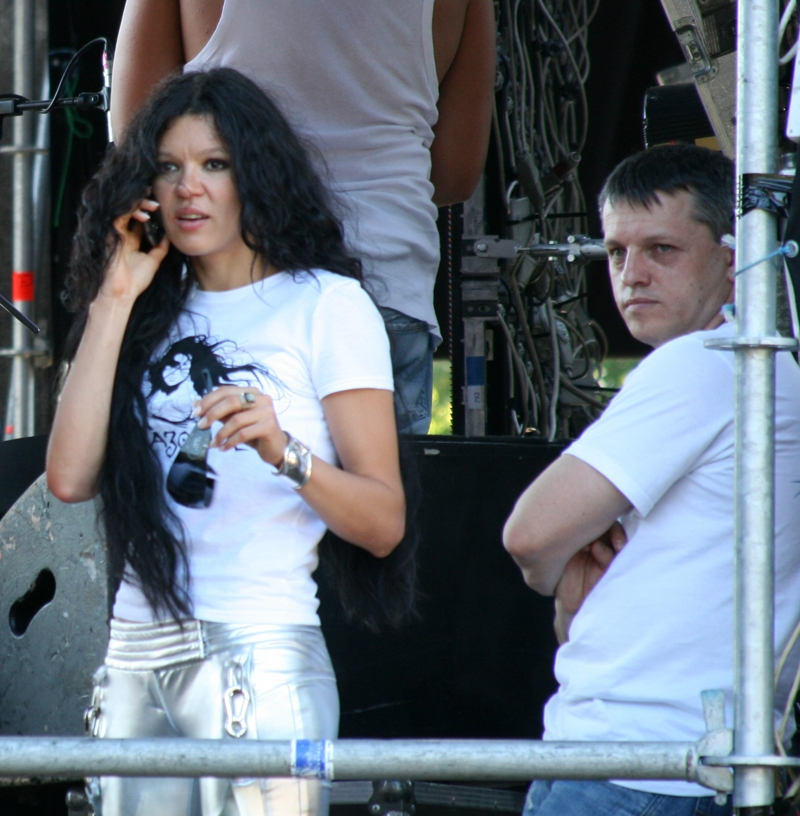
- Ruslana and Oleksandr
- Born: 14 April 1968 (age 58); Lviv, Ukrainian SSR, Soviet Union (now Ukraine)
- Occupations: Record producer, lyricist
- Spouse: Ruslana (m. 1995)

Oleksandr Ksenofontov or Xenophontov (Ukrainian: Олександр Ксенофонтов; born 14 April 1968) is a Soviet (prior to 1991) Ukrainian record producer and lyricist. He is the husband of the winner of the Eurovision Song Contest 2004, Ruslana. Ksenofontov wrote the lyrics to the winning song, "Wild Dances". They have been married since 28 December 1995. He is also a lead singer of legendary Ukrainian rock group Tea Fan Club (Ukrainian: Клуб Шанувальників Чаю, romanized: Klub Shanuval'nykiv Chayu). Together with Ruslana, he is the owner of the Luxen Company.

He is the author of the lyrics of most of Ruslana's Ukrainian songs.
