= Pa un par =

2005 album by Cosmos

Studio album by Cosmos
- Released: May 2005
- Recorded: August 2004 to April 2005
- Genre: A cappella, pop
- Length: 69:02
- Label: UPE
- Producer: Cosmos, Britt Quentin

Cosmos chronology
Cosmos (2003)	Pa un par (2005)	Тетради любви (2005)

Professional ratings
Review scores
Source	Rating
The Recorded A Capella Review Board (RARB)	4.3

Pa un par (On and About) is an album by the Latvian A cappella vocal group Cosmos, that was released on the UPE record label in 2005. The album features original and cover songs in Latvian and English. The recording is entirely vocal, with no instruments used in any of the arrangements.

== Reception ==
The review by Elie Landau in The Recorded A Capella Review Board (RARB) states: "On a sound/performance level, these guys are top-notch, reminding me a lot of baSix and/or perhaps a hipper version of The King's Singers (the similarity to KS goes beyond the six man, two countertenor makeup of both groups — Cosmos covers the KS version of Blackbird on this album)."

== Track listing ==
1. "Pirms" (Jānis Šipkēvics, Andris Sējāns, Reinis Sējāns) – 2:25
2. "Blackbird" (John Lennon, Paul McCartney, arr. Daryl Runswick) – 3:25
3. "Mmm Mmm Mmm Mmm" (Brad Roberts, arr. Andris Sējāns) – 4:19
4. "Change the World" (Tommy Sims, Gordon Kennedy, Wayne Kirkpatrick, arr. Kristaps Šoriņš, Andris Sējāns) – 3:53
5. "Pa un par" (Kārlis Lācis, Andris Sējāns, arr. Kārlis Lācis, Andris Sējāns) – 4:06
6. "Mezs" (Uldis Stabulnieks, arr. Jānis Šipkēvics) – 3:09
7. "Sena dziesma" (Jānis Logins, Arvīds Skalbe, arr. Andris Sējāns) – 3:50
8. "Saullēkts" (Jānis Šipkēvics, Andris Sējāns, Reinis Sējāns) – 4:05
9. "Intermission" – 0:44
10. "I Can't Dance" (Tony Banks, Phil Collins, Mike Rutherford, arr. Reinis Sējāns) – 3:47
11. "Virtual Insanity" (Jason Kay, Toby Smith, arr. Britt Quentin) – 5:07
12. "Got to Get You into My Life" (John Lennon, Paul McCartney, arr. Britt Quentin) – 3:59
13. "Billie Jean" (Michael Jackson, arr. Jānis Šipkēvics) – 3:54
14. "Dear Friends" (Brian May, arr. Jānis Ozols) – 2:02
15. "Saulriets" (Kārlis Lācis, arr. Andris Sējāns) – 6:35
16. "Latvijas Radio Muzikālās Popurijs 2003" (medley arr. Andris Sējāns) – 10:08
  1. "Muzikants" (Tomass Fomins, Guntars Račs)
  2. "I Feel Good" (Ivar Must, Ojārs Kalniņš)
  3. "Es neesmu naprātigs" (Lauris Reiniks, Mārtiņš Freimanis)
  4. "Tu savilnoji mani" (Ainars Melavs, Gints Sola)
  5. "Tā es milu" (Zigmars Liepiņš, Kaspars Dimiters)
  6. "Plaukstas lieluma pavasaris" (Renārs Kaupers)
  7. "Just for You" (Arturs Šingirejs)
  8. "Melanholiskais valsis" (Emīls Dārziņš)
  9. "Paliec tepat" (Jānis Stībelis)
  10. "Tu tuvojies sev" (Andris Kivičs)

- Recorded August 2004 to April 2005

== Personnel ==
- Jānis Šipkēvics – Countertenor
- Andris Sējāns – Countertenor
- Juris Lisenko – Tenor
- Jānis Ozols – Baritone
- Jānis Strazdiņš – Bass
- Reinis Sējāns – Beatbox
- Britt Quentin – Arranger
- Normunds Slava – Mixing engineer
- Viesturs Ozoliņš – Designer
