= Latvia in the Eurovision Song Contest 2006 =

- Eurovision Song Contest 2006
- Participating broadcaster: Latvijas Televīzija (LTV)
- Country: Latvia
- Selection process: Eirodziesma 2006
- Selection date: 11 March 2006

Competing entry
- Song: "I Hear Your Heart"
- Artist: Cosmos
- Songwriters: Reinis Sējāns; Andris Sējāns; Guntars Račs; Molly-Ann Leikin

Placement
- Final result: 16th, 30 points

Participation chronology

Latvia was represented at the Eurovision Song Contest 2006 with the song "I Hear Your Heart", composed by Andris Sējāns and Reinis Sējāns, with lyrics by Guntars Račs and Molly-Ann Leikin, and performed by the group Cosmos. The Latvian participating broadcaster, Latvijas Televīzija (LTV), organised the national final Eirodziesma 2006 in order to select its entry for the contest. Twenty songs were selected to compete in the national final, which consisted of three shows: two semi-finals and a final. In the semi-finals on 4 and 11 February 2006, five entries were selected to advance from each show: three entries selected based on a public televote and two entries selected by a five-member jury panel. Ten songs ultimately qualified to compete in the final on 11 March 2006 where two rounds of public voting selected "I Hear Your Heart" performed by Cosmos as the winner.

As one of the ten highest placed finishers in 2005, Latvia automatically qualified to compete in the final of the Eurovision Song Contest. Performing during the show in position 4, Latvia placed sixteenth out of the 24 participating countries with 30 points.

== Background ==
Prior to the 2007 contest, Latvijas Televīzija (LTV) had participated in the Eurovision Song Contest representing Latvia seven times since its first entry in 2000. It won the contest once in 2002 with the song "I Wanna" performed by Marie N. Following the introduction of semi-finals for the 2004, it was able to qualify to compete in the final in 2005 with the entry "The War Is Not Over" performed by Walters and Kazha.

As part of its duties as participating broadcaster, LTV organises the selection of its entry in the Eurovision Song Contest and broadcasts the event in the country. The broadcaster has selected its entries for the contest through a national final. Since their debut in 2000, LTV had organised the selection show Eirodziesma. The broadcaster organised Eirodziesma 2006 in order to select its entry for the 2006 contest.

== Before Eurovision ==
=== Eirodziesma 2006 ===
Eirodziesma 2006 was the seventh edition of Eirodziesma, the music competition that selects Latvia's entries for the Eurovision Song Contest. The competition commenced on 4 February 2006 and concluded with a final on 11 March 2006. All shows in the competition were hosted by Uģis Joksts and Kristīne Pekule and broadcast on LTV1.

==== Format ====
The format of the competition consisted of three shows: two semi-finals and a final. The two semi-finals, held on 4 and 11 February 2006, each featured ten competing entries from which five advanced to the final from each show. The final, held on 11 March 2006, selected the Latvian entry for Athens from the remaining ten entries over two rounds of voting: the first round selected the top three songs and the second round (superfinal) selected the winner. Results during the semi-final shows were determined by a jury panel and votes from the public. The songs first faced a public vote where the top three entries qualified. The jury then selected an additional two qualifiers from the remaining entries to proceed in the competition. In the final, a public vote exclusively determined which entry would be the winner. Viewers were able to vote via telephone or SMS.

==== Competing entries ====
Artists and songwriters were able to submit their entries to the broadcaster between 20 September 2005 and 22 November 2005. A record 93 entries were submitted at the conclusion of the submission period. A jury panel appointed by LTV evaluated the submitted songs and selected twenty entries for the competition. The jury panel consisted of Ruslana (Ukrainian Eurovision Song Contest 2004 winner), Arsen Shagiev (Russian manager of 2001 Russian Eurovision entrant Mumiy Troll), Igor Volk (Russian producer), Manolo Dias (President of EMI Spain), Ramūnas Zilnys (Lithuanian music journalist), Walters and Kazha (2005 Latvian Eurovision entrant), Toms Grēviņš (radio DJ), Uldis Rudaks (music critic) and Daiga Mazvērsīte (musicologist). The twenty competing artists and songs were announced during a press conference on 6 December 2005. On 20 January 2006, LTV announced that the song "Day or Night" would be performed together with Amberlife by Anna Polanski instead of Jenny May after she was selected with more than one song.

Artist	Song	Songwriter(s)
2 Pieces of Cake	"Bring the Sun"	Ēriks Bubko
Amberlife and Anna Polanski	"Day or Night"	Edgaras Lubys
Beitiku Ģimene	"We Are the Best"	Tomass Kleins, Guntars Račs
Cosmos	"I Hear Your Heart"	Andris Sējāns, Reinis Sējāns, Guntars Račs, Molly-Ann Leikin
Device feat. Davis Kolbergs	"Love Is Everywhere"	Ruslans Kuksenovičs
Ella	"Heaven in Your Eyes"	Thomas G:son, Stig Nygard, Tade Borgmästars, Gustav Käld
Fidji	"Frozen Flower"	Claes Andreasson, Torbjörn Wassenius, Jonas Liberg
Gain Fast	"Last Goodbye"	Danne Attlerud, Thomas Thörnholm, Clas Wrigsel
H2O	"You Say That Kissin' Is Good"	Ilze Melne, Jānis Strapcāns
Jenny May	"I'm Alone"	Andreas Bartels, Mark Klammek, Nick Marriot
Kerija and Santa	"Find You"	Kerija Kalēja, Santa Ozoliņa
Marts Kristiāns Kalniņš and Melomania	"Say It Is"	Ojārs Kalniņš, Imants Kalniņš
May G	"Roll Down"	Inga Gaile, Maija Gaile
Nasty Smile	"Don't"	Ilze Melne, Jānis Strapcāns
Nicol	"Player"	Viktorija Zeļinska
Prego	"Feelin"	Ivo Grīsniņš-Grīslis
Re:public	"Feel the Engine"	Jānis Rībens
Sonja Bishop and Amber	"Later"	Tomass Kleins, Vidar Bostard
VIA Meitenes	"Get Out of My Way"	Lauris Reiniks
Z-Scars	"Every Mother and Every Child"	Andris Kivičs

==== Semi-finals ====
The two semi-finals took place on 4 and 11 February 2006. The live portion of the show was held at the LTV studios in Riga where the artists awaited the results while their performances, which were filmed earlier on 26 and 28 January 2006, were screened. In each semi-final ten acts competed and five entries qualified to the final. The competing entries first faced a public vote where the top three songs advanced; an additional two qualifiers were then selected from the remaining seven entries by the jury. The jury panel that voted in the semi-finals consisted of Marija Naumova (who won Eurovision for Latvia in 2002), Egons Reiters (DJ at Radio SWH and director of LTV), Aigars Dinsbergs (producer), Edgars Kots (Deputy General Director of LTV) and Raimonds Pauls (composer).

Public vote qualifier Jury qualifier

Semi-final 1 – 4 February 2006
R/O	Artist	Song	Jury	Televote		Result
R/O	Artist	Song	Jury	Votes	Rank	Result
1	Beitiku Ģimene	"We Are the Best"	7	2,411	4	—N/a
2	Fidji	"Frozen Flower"	10	518	10	—N/a
3	Cosmos	"I Hear Your Heart"	3	8,459	1	Qualified
4	Marts Kristiāns Kalniņš and Melomania	"Say It Is"	2	5,625	2	Qualified
5	Kerija and Santa	"Find You"	9	1,122	5	—N/a
6	Z-Scars	"Every Mother and Every Child"	4	665	9	Qualified
7	2 Pieces of Cake	"Bring the Sun"	8	1,029	7	—N/a
8	Nicol	"Player"	6	1,053	6	—N/a
9	Sonja Bishop and Amber	"Later"	1	3,758	3	Qualified
10	Prego	"Feelin"	5	875	8	Qualified

Semi-final 2 – 11 February 2006
R/O	Artist	Song	Jury	Televote		Result
R/O	Artist	Song	Jury	Votes	Rank	Result
1	Re:public	"Feel the Engine"	3	621	9	Qualified
2	Amberlife and Anna Polanski	"Day or Night"	7	548	10	—N/a
3	Gain Fast	"Last Goodbye"	1	807	8	Qualified
4	Nasty Smile	"Don’t"	8	840	6	—N/a
5	VIA Meitenes	"Get Out of My Way"	4	1,519	4	—N/a
6	May G	"Roll Down"	5	828	7	—N/a
7	H2O	"You Say That Kissin' Is Good"	2	1,664	2	Qualified
8	Jenny May	"I'm Alone"	10	1,988	1	Qualified
9	Device feat. Davis Kolbergs	"Love Is Everywhere"	9	1,448	5	—N/a
10	Ella	"Heaven in Your Eyes"	6	1,611	3	Qualified

==== Final ====
The final took place at the Olympic Center in Ventspils on 11 March 2006. The ten entries that qualified from the preceding two semi-finals competed and the winner was selected over two rounds of public televoting. In the first round, the top three songs advanced to the second round, the superfinal. In the superfinal, "I Hear Your Heart" performed by Cosmos was declared the winner. In addition to the performances of the competing entries, guest performers included the group Putnu balle, Ivo Fomins (who represented Latvia in 2004) with the group Borowa MC, Walters and Kazha (who represented Latvia in 2005), Sandra Oxenryd (who would represent Estonia in 2006), Brian Kennedy (who would represent Ireland in 2006), and Fabrizio Faniello (who would represent Malta in 2006).

Final – 11 March 2006
R/O	Artist	Song	Televote	Place
1	Cosmos	"I Hear Your Heart"	15,759	1
2	Ella	"Heaven in Your Eyes"	1,651	8
3	Gain Fast	"Last Goodbye"	1,746	7
4	Z-Scars	"Every Mother and Every Child"	605	10
5	Marts Kristiāns Kalniņš and Melomania	"Say It Is"	14,478	2
6	Sonja Bishop and Amber	"Later"	7,190	4
7	Re:public	"Feel the Engine"	1,939	6
8	H2O	"You Say That Kissin' Is Good"	5,962	5
9	Prego	"Feelin"	1,285	9
10	Jenny May	"I'm Alone"	7,796	3

Superfinal – 11 March 2006
R/O	Artist	Song	Televote	Place
1	Cosmos	"I Hear Your Heart"	27,740	1
2	Marts Kristiāns Kalniņš and Melomania	"Say It Is"	23,948	2
3	Jenny May	"I'm Alone"	10,925	3

==== Ratings ====
Viewing figures by show
Show	Air date	Viewing figures		Ref.
Show	Air date	Nominal	Share	Ref.
Final	11 March 2006	275,000	12.4%	

== At Eurovision ==
According to Eurovision rules, all nations with the exceptions of the host country, the "Big Four" (France, Germany, Spain, and the United Kingdom) and the ten highest placed finishers in the 2005 contest are required to qualify from the semi-final in order to compete for the final; the top ten countries from the semi-final progress to the final. As one of the ten highest placed finishers in the 2006 contest, Latvia automatically qualified to compete in the final on 20 May 2006. In addition to their participation in the final, Latvia is also required to broadcast and vote in the semi-final on 18 May 2006. On 21 March 2006, a special allocation draw was held which determined the running order and Latvia was set to perform in position 4 during the final, following the entry from Israel and before the entry from Norway. Latvia placed sixteenth in the final, scoring 30 points.

The semi-final and the final were broadcast in Latvia on LTV1 with all shows featuring commentary by Kārlis Streips. LTV appointed Mārtiņš Freimanis as its spokesperson to announce the Latvian votes during the final.

=== Voting ===
Below is a breakdown of points awarded to Latvia and awarded by Latvia in the semi-final and grand final of the contest. The nation awarded its 12 points to Russia in the semi-final and the final of the contest.

==== Points awarded to Latvia ====
Points awarded to Latvia (Final)
Score	Country
12 points	
10 points	
8 points	Lithuania; Monaco
7 points	
6 points	
5 points	
4 points	Ireland; Ukraine
3 points	Estonia
2 points	United Kingdom
1 point	Russia

==== Points awarded by Latvia ====
Points awarded by Latvia (Semi-final)
Score	Country
12 points	Russia
10 points	Lithuania
8 points	Finland
7 points	Estonia
6 points	Ukraine
5 points	Sweden
4 points	Ireland
3 points	Poland
2 points	Bosnia and Herzegovina
1 point	Iceland

Points awarded by Latvia (Final)
Score	Country
12 points	Russia
10 points	Lithuania
8 points	Finland
7 points	Sweden
6 points	Norway
5 points	Ukraine
4 points	Ireland
3 points	Germany
2 points	Romania
1 point	United Kingdom
