= Ukraine in the Eurovision Song Contest 2006 =

- Eurovision Song Contest 2006
- Participating broadcaster: National Television Company of Ukraine (NTU)
- Country: Ukraine
- Selection process: Ty – Zirka!
- Selection date: 11 March 2006

Competing entry
- Song: "Show Me Your Love"
- Artist: Tina Karol
- Songwriters: Mikhail Nekrasov; Tina Karol; Pavlo Shylko

Placement
- Semi-final result: Qualified (7th, 146 points)
- Final result: 7th, 145 points

Participation chronology

Ukraine was represented at the Eurovision Song Contest 2006 with the song "Show Me Your Love", written by Mikhail Nekrasov, Tina Karol, and Pavlo Shylko, and performed by Karol herself. The Ukrainian participating broadcaster, the National Television Company of Ukraine (NTU), organised the music competition series Ty – Zirka! in order to select its entry for the contest. Twelve contestants competed in the competition which consisted of four shows: three elimination shows, held on 28 January, 11 February and 25 February 2006, and a final, held on 11 March 2006. Three acts qualified to compete in the final, where "I Am Your Queen" performed by Tina Karol was selected as the winner following the combination of votes from a three-member jury panel and a public televote. The song was later retitled as "Show Me Your Love".

Ukraine competed in the semi-final of the Eurovision Song Contest which took place on 18 May 2006. Performing during the show in position 15, "Show Me Your Love" was announced among the top 10 entries of the semi-final and therefore qualified to compete in the final on 20 May. It was later revealed that Ukraine placed seventh out of the 23 participating countries in the semi-final with 146 points. In the final, Ukraine performed in position 18 and placed seventh out of the 24 participating countries with 145 points.

== Background ==
Prior to the 2006 contest, the National Television Company of Ukraine (NTU) had participated in the Eurovision Song Contest representing Ukraine three times since its first entry in 2003, winning the contest in 2004 with the song "Wild Dances" performed by Ruslana. Following the introduction of semi-finals for the 2004, it had managed to qualify to final in every contest they participated in thus far. Its least successful result had been 19th place, achieved in 2005, with the song "Razom nas bahato" performed by GreenJolly.

As part of its duties as participating broadcaster, NTU organises the selection of its entry in the Eurovision Song Contest and broadcasts the event in the country. The broadcaster confirmed their intentions to participate at the 2006 contest on 6 November 2005. In the past, NTU had alternated between both internal selections and national finals in order to select its entry. In 2005, the broadcaster had set up a national final with several artists to choose both the song and performer. The method was continued to select the 2006 entry.

== Before Eurovision ==
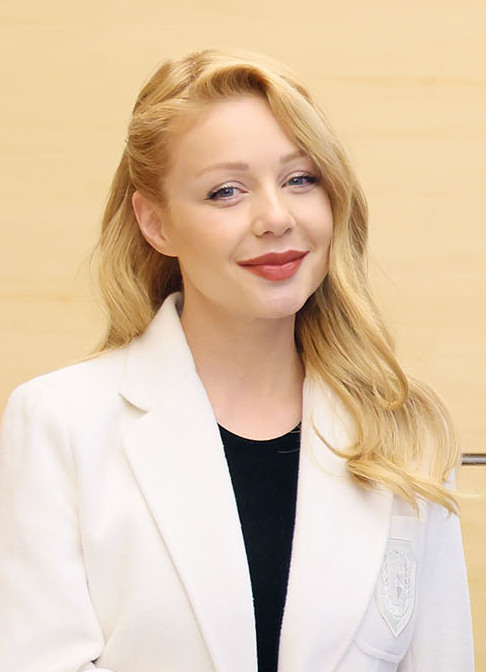
Tina Karol was selected to represent Ukraine in 2006

=== Ty – Zirka! ===
Ty – Zirka! (Ukrainian: Ти – Зiрка!) was the Ukrainian version of the Irish music competition series You're a Star which selected the Ukrainian entry for the Eurovision Song Contest 2006. The competition commenced on 28 January 2006 and concluded with a final on 11 March 2006. All shows in the competition took place at the NTU Studios in Kyiv, hosted by Maria Orlova and Igor Posypaiko and broadcast on Pershyi Natsionalnyi.

==== Format ====
The competition and ultimately the selection of the Ukrainian Eurovision entry took place over three stages. In the first stage, singers had the opportunity to apply for the competition by attending a scheduled audition during designated dates. Twelve acts, two from each audition, were selected and worked with a professional team of stylists, choreographers, vocal teachers and psychologists throughout the process. The second stage consisted of the televised elimination shows which took place on 28 January, 11 February and 25 February 2006. Each of the contestants performed cover versions of famous world and/or national hits, and three contestants were eliminated per show based on the 50/50 combination of votes from a public televote and an expert jury. The third stage was the final, which took place on 11 March 2006 and featured the remaining three acts vying to represent Ukraine in Athens. Each finalist performed their candidate Eurovision songs and the winner was selected via the 50/50 combination of votes from a public televote and an expert jury. Both the public televote and the expert jury assigned scores ranging from 1 (lowest) to 12 (highest) during each of the shows based on the number of contestants in the respective show. Viewers participating in the public televote during the four live shows had the opportunity to submit their votes for the contestants via telephone or SMS. In the event of a tie, the tie was decided in favour of the contestant/entry that received the highest score from the public televote.

==== Contestants ====
Singers had the opportunity to attend auditions that were held between 6 December 2005 and 23 December 2005 in the following six cities: Chernihiv, Poltava, Dnipro, Odesa, Chernivtsi and Kyiv. A five-member selection panel consisting of Olena Mozgova (director of music and entertainment at NTU), Serhiy Kuzin (general director of Hit FM), Eduard Klim (general director of Lavina Music), Olga Strukova (stylist) and an additional member per audition: Natalya Mogilevskaya (Chernihiv), Andriy Kuzmenko (Poltava), Alena Vinnitskaya (Dnipro), Iryna Bilyk (Odesa), Viktor Pavlik (Chernivtsi) and 2003 Ukrainian Eurovision entrant Oleksandr Ponomaryov (Kyiv), reviewed the 360 candidates and shortlisted two contestants from each audition site for the competition.

Audition sites and selected contestants
Audition site	Date	Selected contestants
Chernihiv	6 December 2005	Irina Rosenfeld; Natalia Volkova
Poltava	8 December 2005	Daria Mineeva; Evgenia Saharova
Dnipro	10 December 2005	Anastasia Lushnikova; Vladimir Tkachenko
Odesa	12 December 2005	Kirill Turichenko; Stanislav Konkin
Chernivtsi	15 December 2005	Anna Kohanchik; Taras Dobrovolskiy
Kyiv	23 December 2005	Olga Sviridenko; Tina Karol

==== Elimination shows ====
The three elimination shows took place on 28 January, 11 February and 25 February 2006. Twelve contestants competed by performing Ukrainian hit songs in the first show, world hits in the second show and past Eurovision Song Contest entries in the third show. Three acts were eliminated per show as determined following the combination of votes from a public televote and an expert jury. Due to the withdrawal of Olga Sviridenko following the first show for health reasons, only two were eliminated in the second show. 65,700 votes were registered by the televote over the three elimination shows. In addition to the performances of the contestants, 2006 Slovenian Eurovision entrant Anžej Dežan performed the 2006 Slovenian entry "Mr Nobody" as a guest during the third show.

Show 1 – 28 January 2006
R/O	Artist	Song (Original artist)	Jury	Televote	Total	Place	Result
1	Taras Dobrovolskiy	"Vosmiy kolir" (Восьмий колір) (Motor'rolla)	9	3	12	7	Qualified
2	Olga Sviridenko	"Spi sobi sama" (Спи собі сама) (Skryabin)	5	4	9	9	Qualified
3	Irina Rosenfeld	"Panno kokhannya" (Панно кохання) (Taisia Povaliy)	10	8	18	3	Qualified
4	Daria Mineeva	"Matematika" (Математика) (Druha Rika)	1	1	2	12	—N/a
5	Stanislav Konkin	"Ya soshel s uma" (Я сошел с ума) (Tabula Rasa)	12	2	14	5	Qualified
6	Kirill Turichenko	"Varto chy ni" (Варто чи ні) (Oleksandr Ponomariov)	11	11	22	1	Qualified
7	Tina Karol	"Fayne misto Ternopil'" (Файне місто Тернопіль) (Braty Hadiukiny)	8	12	20	2	Qualified
8	Anastasia Lushnikova	"Stereosistema" (Стереосистема) (Green Grey)	2	7	9	11	—N/a
9	Anna Kohanchik	"Dity svitla" (Діти світла) (Gaitana)	4	9	13	6	Qualified
10	Evgenia Saharova	"Misyats" (Місяць) (Natalia Mohylevska)	3	6	9	10	—N/a
11	Natalia Volkova	"Sertse" (Серце) (Oleksandr Ponomariov)	7	10	17	4	Qualified
12	Vladimir Tkachenko	"Tam, de ty e" (Там, де ти є) (Ani Lorak)	6	5	11	8	Qualified

Show 2 – 11 February 2006
R/O	Artist	Song (Original artist)	Jury	Televote	Total	Place	Result
1	Natalia Volkova	"The Look" (Roxette)	5	11	16	6	Qualified
2	Kirill Turichenko	"Always" (Bon Jovi)	10	9	19	3	Qualified
3	Taras Dobrovolskiy	"I've Been Thinking About You" (Londonbeat)	6	5	11	8	—N/a
4	Irina Rosenfeld	"Dancing Queen" (ABBA)	11	10	21	1	Qualified
5	Stanislav Konkin	"Sunshine Reggae" (Laid Back)	9	7	16	5	Qualified
6	Anna Kohanchik	"Hot Stuff" (Donna Summer)	8	6	14	7	—N/a
7	Vladimir Tkachenko	"They Won't Go When I Go" (George Michael)	12	8	20	2	Qualified
8	Tina Karol	"Je t'aime" (Lara Fabian)	7	12	19	4	Qualified

Show 3 – 25 February 2006
R/O	Artist	Song (Original artist)	Jury	Televote	Total	Place	Result
1	Tina Karol	"I Control You" (Joy Fleming)	9	12	21	2	Qualified
2	Kirill Turichenko	"In Your Eyes" (Niamh Kavanagh)	12	9	21	1	Qualified
3	Irina Rosenfeld	"Ding-a-dong" (Teach In)	10	10	20	3	Qualified
4	Natalia Volkova	"HaSheket SheNish'ar" (Shiri Maimon)	7	11	18	5	—N/a
5	Stanislav Konkin	"Save Your Kisses for Me" (Brotherhood of Man)	8	7	15	6	—N/a
6	Vladimir Tkachenko	"Why?" (Geir Rönning)	11	8	19	4	—N/a

==== Final ====
The final took place on 11 March 2006. The three finalists competed by performing their candidate Eurovision entries. The winner, "I Am Your Queen" performed by Tina Karol, was selected through the combination of votes from a public televote and an expert jury. Ties were decided in favour of the entries that received higher scores from the public televote. 12,811 votes were registered by the televote during the show. In addition to the performances of the competing entries, 2006 Belarusian Eurovision entrant Polina Smolova performed the 2006 Belarusian entry "Mum" as a guest.

Final – 11 March 2006
R/O	Artist	Song	Jury	Televote		Total	Place
R/O	Artist	Song	Jury	Votes	Points	Total	Place
1	Kirill Turichenko	"Boombox"	11	1,659	10	21	3
2	Tina Karol	"I Am Your Queen"	12	8,755	12	24	1
3	Irina Rosenfeld	"You Give Me Your Love"	10	2,397	11	21	2

==== Controversy ====
The selection of Tina Karol as a contestant of Ty – Zirka! led to accusations of bias due to NTU's decision to allow an established act to compete against amateur singers. A group of Ukrainian artists led by the Head of the Institute for Musical Art Oleksandr Chunikhin made a formal complaint about the selection process to President Viktor Yushcenko, mentioning the unprofessionalism of its jury and, allegedly, manipulation of the televote. It was also claimed that the most famous specialists in Ukraine were prohibited from being involved in preparing the contestants, and that the selection of contestants lacked transparency making public participation symbolic. In response, head of the jury Olena Mozgova stated that the jury "works transparently" with their votes being "documented and certified by a state notary public".

Following Tina Karol's victory at Ty – Zirka!, it was suspected that "I Am Your Queen" was "too suspiciously similar" to the 2005 Eurovision winning song "My Number One". NTU later stated that the song would undergo significant changes for the contest.

=== Preparation ===
"I Am Your Queen" was retitled and revamped as "Show Me Your Love" for the Eurovision Song Contest, featuring new arrangement and lyrics. The official music video of the song, directed by Herman Hlynsky and filmed in Kyiv at the Kayf restaurant and the Pomada Club, was released on 30 March.

== At Eurovision ==
According to Eurovision rules, all nations with the exceptions of the host country, the "Big Four" (France, Germany, Spain and the United Kingdom) and the ten highest placed finishers in the 2005 contest are required to qualify from the semi-final on 18 May 2006 in order to compete for the final on 20 May 2006; the top ten countries from the semi-final progress to the final. On 21 March 2006, a special allocation draw was held which determined the running order for the semi-final and Ukraine was set to perform in position 15, following the entry from Turkey and before the entry from Finland.

In Ukraine, both the semi-final and the final were broadcast on Pershyi Natsionalnyi with commentary by Pavlo Shylko. NTU appointed Igor Posypayko as its spokesperson to announce the Ukrainian votes during the final.

=== Semi-final ===
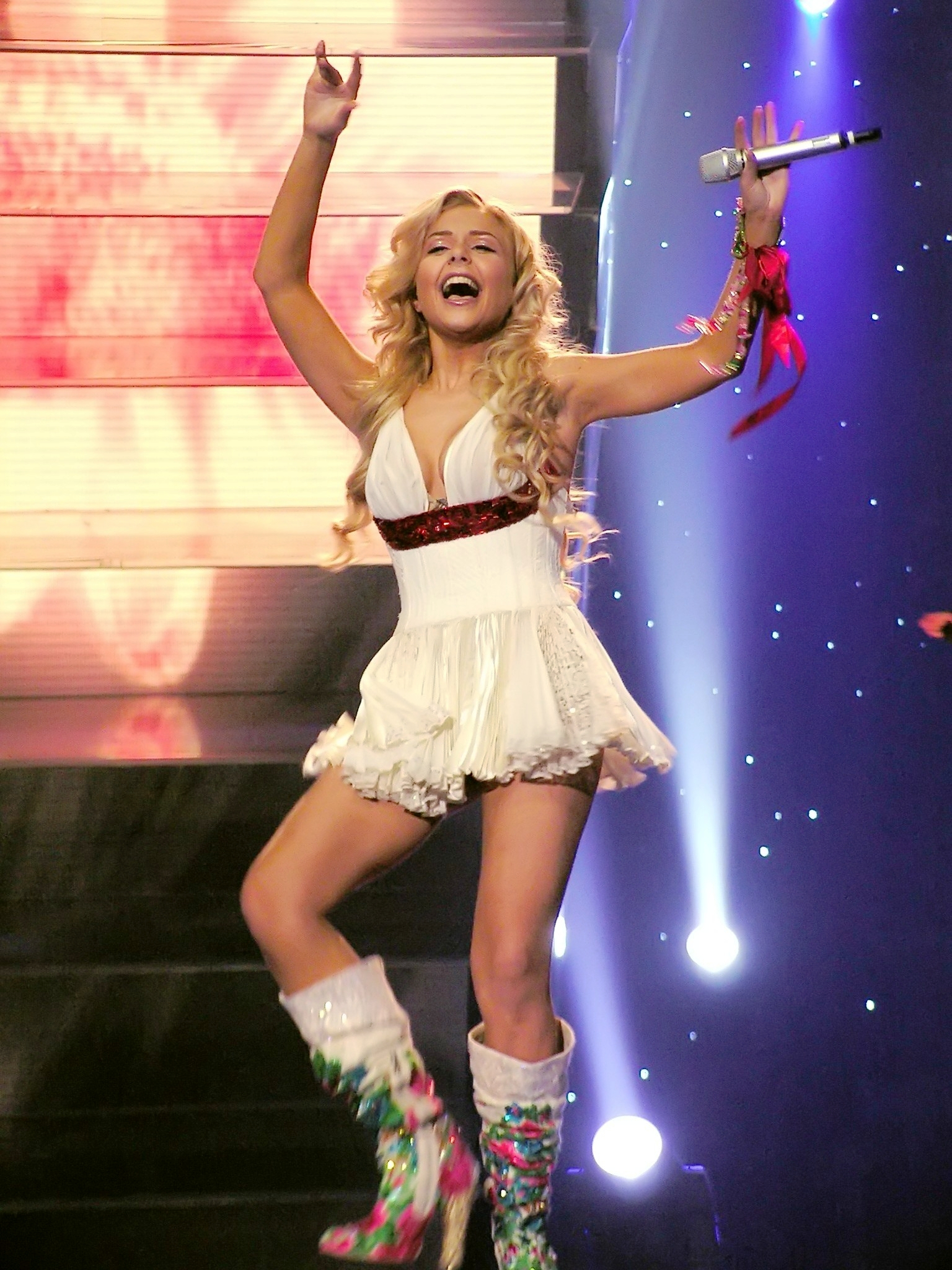
Tina Karol during a rehearsal before the semi-final

Tina Karol took part in technical rehearsals on 12 and 14 May, followed by dress rehearsals on 17 and 18 May. The Ukrainian performance featured Tina Karol performing on stage in a white corset dress with a red ribbon, a pleated skirt and knee-high boots designed by Victoria Hres together with five dancers. The stage displayed predominantly red lighting, while the performance featured the dancers performing a gymnastic dance routine, which included picking up a long chain rope and skipping through one by one, as well as spinning around in patterned folk skirts during the bridge. The performance was concluded with the performers holding tambourines in the air.

At the end of the show, Ukraine was announced as having finished in the top 10 and subsequently qualifying for the grand final. It was later revealed that Ukraine placed seventh in the semi-final, receiving a total of 146 points.

=== Final ===
The draw for the running order for the final was done by the presenters during the announcement of the ten qualifying countries during the semi-final and Ukraine was drawn to perform in position 18, following the entry from Finland and before the entry from France. Tina Karol once again took part in dress rehearsals on 19 and 20 May before the final and performed a repeat of her semi-final performance during the final on 20 May. Ukraine placed seventh in the final, scoring 145 points.

=== Voting ===
Below is a breakdown of points awarded to Ukraine and awarded by Ukraine in the semi-final and grand final of the contest. The nation awarded its 12 points to Russia in the semi-final and the final of the contest.

==== Points awarded to Ukraine ====
Points awarded to Ukraine (Semi-final)
Score	Country
12 points	
10 points	Armenia; Belarus; Moldova; Portugal; Russia
8 points	Israel; Romania
7 points	Turkey
6 points	Andorra; Cyprus; Latvia; Lithuania; Poland
5 points	Iceland; Serbia and Montenegro
4 points	Estonia; Greece
3 points	Bosnia and Herzegovina; Bulgaria; Ireland; Malta; Spain
2 points	Croatia; Finland; Macedonia; Monaco; Slovenia
1 point	

Points awarded to Ukraine (Final)
Score	Country
12 points	Portugal
10 points	Armenia; Belarus; Russia
8 points	Moldova; Turkey
7 points	Lithuania
6 points	Cyprus; Iceland; Israel; Poland
5 points	Andorra; Bosnia and Herzegovina; Estonia; Greece; Latvia; Macedonia
4 points	Croatia
3 points	Bulgaria; Romania; Spain
2 points	Finland; Malta; Monaco; Serbia and Montenegro; Slovenia
1 point	Ireland; Netherlands; Sweden

==== Points awarded by Ukraine ====
Points awarded by Ukraine (Semi-final)
Score	Country
12 points	Russia
10 points	Poland
8 points	Bosnia and Herzegovina
7 points	Armenia
6 points	Finland
5 points	Lithuania
4 points	Sweden
3 points	Cyprus
2 points	Slovenia
1 point	Belarus

Points awarded by Ukraine (Final)
Score	Country
12 points	Russia
10 points	Bosnia and Herzegovina
8 points	Armenia
7 points	Finland
6 points	Sweden
5 points	Lithuania
4 points	Latvia
3 points	Norway
2 points	Ireland
1 point	Romania
