= Jānis Ozols =

Latvian conductor

- Born: 1 November 1980 (age 45); Riga, Latvia
- Known for: Conductor

Jānis Ozols (born 1 November 1980 in Riga, Latvia) is a Latvian choral conductor, television personality, gastronomy blogger and former member of vocal group Cosmos.

Currently the artistic director and conductor of youth choir "MASKA", as well as the host of Lattelecom TV channel "360TV" weekly broadcasts of "Culture Sundays". He also led the culinary show "We live deliciously". Since 2011 the Riga district conductor and since 2014 Jurmala city choir chief conductor. In his spare time – blogger at culinary blog "Restaurant at home and not only ..."

== Life ==
Jānis Ozols was born in Riga on 1 November 1980, in a family of lawyer Nikolajs Jānis (1937–2007) and vendor Lilita Blome (later Ozola, 1942–2003). Conductor's parents had no connection with music, only as much as his mother's years of work in a music store, selling wide range of vinyl records.

Jānis Ozols studied in Emīls Dārziņš Music School between 1989 and 1996 and the Riga Dome Choir School (RDCS) in choir conducting class between 1996 and 1999. A year after graduating from the choir conducting class in RDCS, he studied music management in RDCS culture management department.

In 2004 he received his professional bachelor's degree in Jāzeps Vītols Latvian Academy of Music, the choir conducting class with professor Sigvards Kļava. In 2013 with professor Jānis Zirnis holds a master's degree in choral conducting. In 2013 and 2014 studied orchestra conducting (master study direction) at the Swedish Royal College of Music in Stockholm.

== Career ==
Jānis Ozols has been a singer, conductor and artistic director of several choirs and vocal groups in Latvia. From 1998 to 2003, he sang baritone in the Riga Dome Choir School boys choir, and from 2001 to 2004, representing the same voice group, sang in the choir "Chorus Sapiens".

Ozols was a conductor of choirs "Atskaņa" (1997–2012), "Rīga" (1999–2000), "Jūrmala" (2000–2002), "Dziesmuvara" (2002–2004) and "Vanema" (2010–2015). He has been an artistic director of vocal group "Jauna nianse" (2000–2003). Now works with Garkalne mixed choir "Pa Saulei" (2010) which is led by his wife Marta Ozola along with colleague Margarita Dudcaka. Currently Jānis Ozols is the artistic director and conductor of youth choir "Maska". Established in 2000, youth choir "Maska" is currently one of the best amateur choirs in Latvia.

As a singer of vocal group "Cosmos" (2002) Jānis Ozols has collaborated with such world renowned artists as Bobby McFerrin, The Real Group, Take 6, The Manhattan Transfer, The Hilliard Ensemble, The New York Voices, The Flying Pickets, M-pact and Icelandic music icon Björk. "Cosmos" won the contest of young singers "New Wave" in 2004 and received the Latvian Great Music Award in 2009.

Parallel to his everyday work, Ozols is involved in projects unrelated with choral music. On 2013 he was a host of culinary show "We live deliciously" ("Garšīgi dzīvojam"). Since 2015 Jānis Ozols also is a host of "Culture Sundays" ("Kultūras domnīca"), which is one of Lattelecom TV channel "360TV" weekly broadcasts.

He has been a member of the jury in several competitions and local television shows, such as the "General Student Song and Dance Festival" choral competitions (2015), jazz vocalist competition "Pärnu Ballaad" in Pärnu, Estonia (2013), the 50th International Choir Competition "Seghizzi 2011" in Gorizia, Italy, as well as several television shows, one of them – "Latvian Golden Talents".

Ozols has led master classes in Stockholm, Sweden – "Latvian choir musical pearls" in 2014, as well as worked in the academic music field by conducting and staging both – already known classical compositions Gävle Symphony Orchestra, staged Tchaikovsky's 5th Symphony in 2014, as well as new talent premieres (Sinfonietta Riga, staged premiere of Rihards Zaļupe oratorio "Bread" for orchestra, choir and soloists (2013)). In 2015 produced choral music album "Winter" (music by Laura Jēkabsone), in collaboration with the Latvian National Symphony Orchestra String group, pianist Aurelia Šimkus, choir "Maska", soloists Santa Pētersone, Laura Jēkabsone, Jānis Strazdiņš and Ģirts Ozolinš, as well as with the harpers ensemble "Balti" and guitarist Gints Smukais.

== Awards, nominations and competitions ==
- Music album "7 Gospels of the gospel of Thomas" (composer Rihards Zaļupe, youth choir Maska, Xylem Trio) nominated to "Latvian Annual Music Award 2010" in the categories "Debut of the Year" and "Best classical music album" (2011)
- The special award "Best conductor" at the 13th International choir competition "Europe and its Songs" in Barcelona (with the participation of the youth choir "Maska", 2011)
- "The best new conductor" award of 49th International Choir Competition "SCHEGHIZZI 2010" (with the participation of the youth choir "Maska", 2010)
- Latvian "Great Music Award" – best musical album for children in 2009 (vocal group "Cosmos", 2010)
- Latvian "Great Music Award" category "Concert of the Year" (vocal group "Cosmos", 2009)
- 3rd place in Jāzeps Vītols International Conductors Competition (2009)
