= Kārlis Būmeisters =

Latvian musician, artist, guitarist and TV host

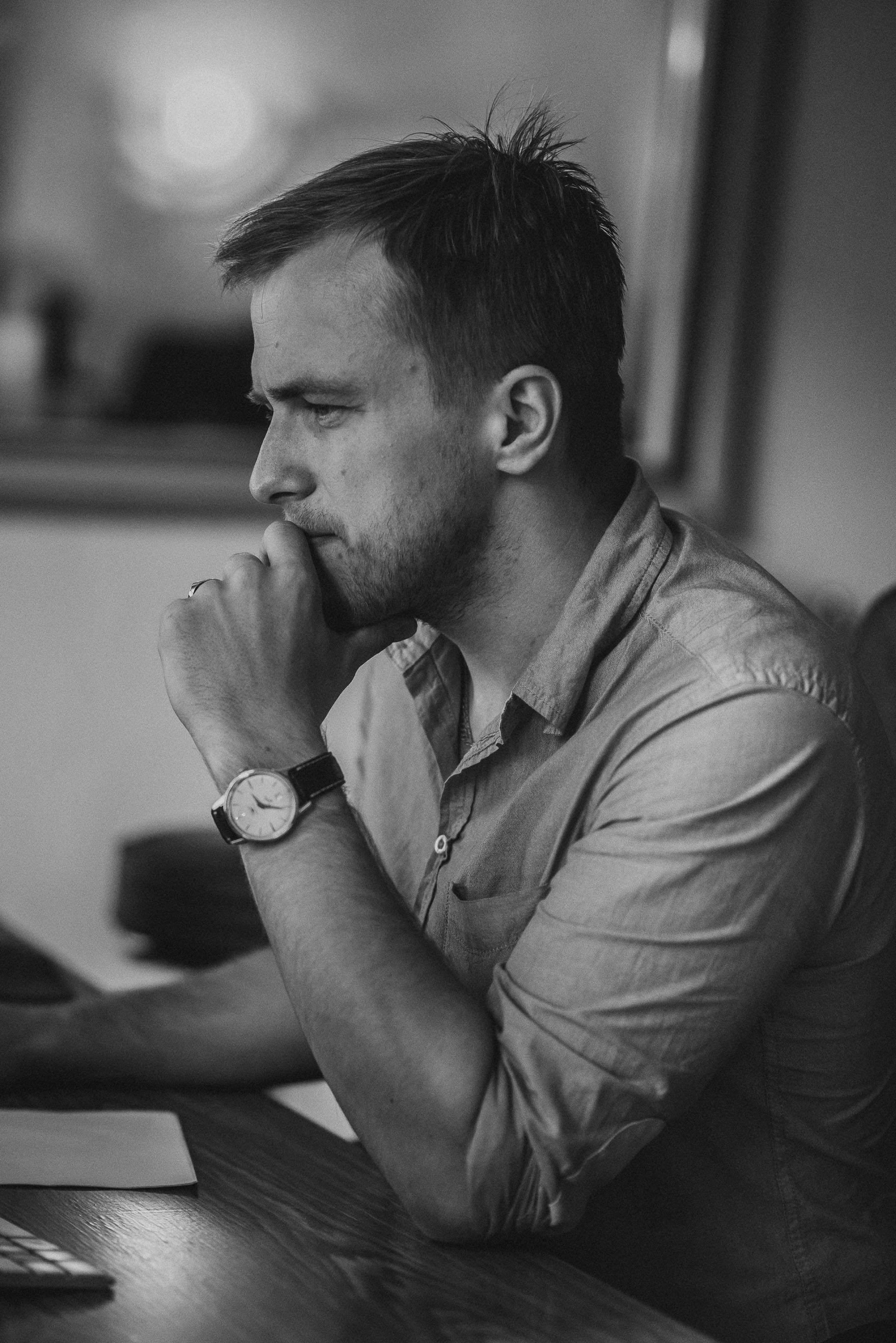

Background information
- Born: 13 December 1986; Riga, Latvia
- Origin: Riga, Latvia
- Occupation(s): Musician, singer, TV personality, political spokesperson
- Years active: 2002-present

Kārlis Būmeisters (born December 13, 1986, in Riga) is a Latvian musician, artist, guitarist and TV host once using the stage name Kaža. He is now in politics in the European Parliament in Brussels as a press secretary for the European Parliament Member Roberts Zīle who is part of the European Conservatives and Reformists (ECR) group.

== Biography ==
From the age of three, Būmeister appeared as a child singer on Latvian television. He eventually hosted the award-winning show Lie Lab on LTV.

Būmeisters' musical career continued with the band Dzeguzīte. He then became a member of Putnu Balle, a musical band formed in 2002 with Mārtiņš Freimanis (a former member of the famous Latvian band Tumsa). In 2004 the band toured under the slogan "Dziesma manai paaudzei" meaning "Song for My Generation". The band released two albums: Sapņu pārdevējs (meaning Dream seller) and Mr. Andersen nemelo

In Eurovision Song Contest 2005, he represented Latvia with the song "The War Is Not Over" in a musical formation Valters and Kaža with the artist Valters Frīdenbergs. In the act, Būmeisters was credited as Kaža. The song was written by Mārtiņš Freimanis. The duo finished fifth overall in 24 acts in the final with the respectable 153 points.

After Eurovision, in 2008, he founded his solo project, winning "Music Record of the Year" during Muzikālā banka Awards. He also sang the theme for the TV series introductory song for the series UgunsGrēks titled "Tici vai nē" (meaning Believe it or not). It was awarded The Hit of the Year award during the 2010 Latvian Music Awards.

He was a Managing Director at Music Online (a digital music streaming and download platform in Baltic region). He is also owner of Cloud Music Studio specializing in recording, mixing, mastering.

In 2018, he joined Valters Frīdenbergs, his partner in the duo Valters and Kaža, with the new single "Ceļi atpakaļ". Frīdenbergs died the same year after a two-year long battle with cancer.

== Personal life ==
He is the son of Juris Būmeister, a dissident during the communist Soviet Union era. His grandfather is politician Kārlis Būmeisters (1888-1967) after whom he was named.

Būmeister studied at Riga V. Zālītis Primary School, then went to Āgenskalna Valsts Gymnasium. He completed his university studies at University of Latvia in the Faculty of Economics with a master's degree in international economics, plus a degree from School of Business and Management ESCEM in France.

He married his girlfriend Linda Meiere after 11 years of being together. In 2015, he had a son named Edvarts.
