= Cosmos (band) =

Latvian musical group

Vocal Group Cosmos
- Origin: Riga, Latvia
- Genres: A cappella, pop, Classical
- Years active: 2002–2010
- Label: Upe
- Members: Jānis Šipkēvics; Andris Sējāns; Juris Lisenko; Jānis Ozols; Jānis Strazdiņš; Reinis Sējāns

Vocal Group Cosmos (commonly known as Cosmos) was a Latvian a cappella band that formed in Riga in 2002. The band comprised singers Jānis Šipkēvics, Andris Sējāns (both countertenors), Juris Lisenko (tenor), Jānis Ozols (baritone), Jānis Strazdiņš (bass) and Reinis Sējāns (beatbox).

Cosmos gained national and international recognition after they were chosen to represent Latvia in the Eurovision Song Contest 2006 held in Athens, Greece, with the song "I Hear Your Heart". Despite winning the national Eirodziesma 2006 contest, the band finished in joint sixteenth place out of the twenty-four finalists, with thirty points.

== Discography ==
- Cosmos (2003)
- Pa un par (2005)
- Тетради любви (2005)
- Ticu un viss (2005)
- Turbulence (2008)
- Pasaki man un tev (2009)

Awards and achievements
Preceded by Walters & Kazha with "The War Is Not Over"	Latvia in the Eurovision Song Contest; 2006	Succeeded by Bonaparti.lv with "Questa notte"
