= M-pact =

American pop-jazz vocal group

m-pact
- Genres: Jazz, pop, a cappella
- Years active: 1995–present
- Website: www.m-pact.com

m-pact (pronounced "impact") is an American pop-jazz vocal group based in Los Angeles, California. Founded in June 1995, the band is known for their vocal arrangements, recordings, and music videos. The name "m-pact" signifies an agreement between the members to remain true to the group's musical and artistic vision. Initially a five-man ensemble in Seattle, Washington, the group sought to blend the harmonic and arranging styles of vocal jazz with a beatbox-driven rhythm section. The membership has changed over the years, influencing the group's sound while adhering to its original vision.

m-pact has recorded seven full-length albums, a two-volume greatest hits collection, four EPs, and several singles. While in Seattle, they provided vocals for comedy/parody albums produced by radio personality Bob Rivers and recorded the theme song for the Disney special "Seasons of Giving". Their song "If I Lost You" was re-recorded in Korean for a Korean soap opera. m-pact has also performed on the PBS special "LA Holiday Celebration" and opened for Jay Leno at the McCallum Theatre.

== History ==
=== The Seattle years (1995–2004) ===
m-pact was formed in 1995 in Seattle by Marco Cassone, Trist Curless, Jonathan Gonzales, Carl Kelley, and Matthew Selby. Curless, Gonzales, and Selby were fellow students at the University of Northern Colorado, while Cassone and Kelley were singers in Seattle. A mutual friend connected Cassone and Curless, leading to the formation of the group.

After settling in Seattle, m-pact began rehearsing and performing locally. Their first public performance was at Incredible Universe in Auburn, Washington. In early 1996, they won the Harmony Sweepstakes national a cappella competition, winning first place and "Audience Favorite." They then released their debut album, It's All About Harmony, and won two Contemporary A Cappella Recording Awards (CARAs).

As m-pact transitioned to full-time touring, Carl Kelley departed, and Britt Quentin joined in 1997. Later that year, Jonathan Gonzales left due to vocal health concerns, and Greg Whipple joined. In 1998, they released their second album, 2, which included a cover of Earth, Wind & Fire's "Fantasy". "Fantasy" won a CARA for Best Pop/Rock Cover Song in 1999.

Their holiday album, The Carol Commission, released in 1999, featured arrangements from various arrangers and won two CARAs. Matthew Selby then left the group and Jake Moulton joined.

m-pact toured extensively throughout the late 1990s and early 2000s, performing in North America, Europe, and Southeast Asia. In 2001, 2 was re-released in Japan by Fab Records, and the group toured Japan, appearing on Fuji Television. After Greg Whipple's departure, Steve Wallace and then Rudy Cardenas joined. m-pact continued touring, including a performance at the 2003 Tabarka Jazz Festival in Tunisia. They released two EPs in 2001 and 2003 and recorded a live album at The Triple Door in 2004 before relocating to Los Angeles.

=== The Los Angeles years (2004–2016) ===
m-pact moved to Los Angeles in May 2004. Jeff Smith joined in June 2004, expanding the group to a sextet. They continued touring, performing at festivals like Festilac in Switzerland with Boyz II Men, and others in Germany, Italy, Estonia, and elsewhere.

In 2006, they released the self-titled album m-pact, featuring jazz standards and original compositions. The album was reviewed in JazzTimes and won two CARAs. Jake Moulton left due to vocal health concerns, and various singers substituted, including Tonoccus McClain, Matt Alber, and Matthew Selby. They also performed in Singapore and Indonesia.

Rudy Cardenas appeared on season six of American Idol in 2007 and subsequently left the group for a solo career. Fletcher Sheridan replaced him. m-pact participated in the "Amazing Voice" festival in South Korea alongside The Real Group, Rajaton, and The Idea of North. David Loucks joined in 2008.

Over the next two years, m-pact performed internationally, including in Germany, Korea, and Singapore. Britt Quentin departed in 2009 to join the West End production of "Thriller – Live". Fletcher Sheridan moved to soprano, and Jarrett Johnson joined as alto.

m-pact continued performing, and Morten Kjær replaced David Loucks in 2010. They released music videos on YouTube in 2014, including "Human Nature", "Signed, Sealed, Delivered I'm Yours", and a Stevie Wonder/Michael Jackson medley with Duwende. They were guest artists at the A Cappella Academy. Kenton Chen replaced Morten Kjær in late 2014.

In the following years, m-pact performed at various festivals and conferences, including the Los Angeles A Cappella Festival, The Sing Off Tour, and the American Choral Directors Association (ACDA) conference. Founders Trist Curless and Marco Cassone retired in 2016. Curless joined The Manhattan Transfer, and Cassone pursued a consulting career.

=== "m-pact 2.0" (2016–present) ===
Jeff Smith formed a new lineup with Tracy Robertson, Drew Tablak, Aaron Schumacher, Jamond McCoy, and Jared Jenkins, who was later replaced by Andy Degan. This new iteration performed at the Kettering A Cappella Festival and recorded "Silent Night" for The Black and White Sessions on YouTube.

They continued touring and performed at the Disney Food and Wine Festival in 2017. They released videos for "Don't You Worry 'bout a Thing" and "Guillotine," the latter receiving nominations at the A Cappella Video Awards.

In 2018, m-pact released the EP Wonderful World, featuring new and previously unreleased material. The EP won two CARAs. They also released videos for "Come Together" and "We Can Work It Out".

In 2019, m-pact performed at the Jazz Education Network conference and toured internationally. They released a video of an Earth, Wind & Fire medley and launched the m-pact Vocal Festival.

In 2020, m-pact celebrated their 25th anniversary with the release of 25 Years of Harmony (Vol 1 & 2), featuring remastered, rare, and new tracks. They also released several singles and a music video for "A Change in My Life". Daniel Weidlein replaced Tracy Robertson on bass in 2021. Drew Tablak departed in 2022 and was replaced by Gregory Fletcher in 2023. A new album, in collaboration with Roger Treece, is planned for release in mid-2024.

== Personnel ==
Current members

- Jeff Smith – vocal percussion, third tenor vocals (2004–present)
- Aaron Schumacher – second tenor vocals (2016–2022), first tenor vocals (2022–present)
- Jamond McCoy – baritone vocals (2016–present)
- Andy Degan – third tenor vocals (2016–2022), second tenor vocals (2022–present)
- Daniel Weidlein – bass vocals (2021–present)
- Gregory Fletcher – third tenor vocals (2023–present)

Former members

- Marco Cassone – third tenor vocals (1995–2016)
- Trist Curless – bass vocals (1995–2016)
- Carl Kelley – first tenor vocals (1995–1996)
- Jonathan Gonzales – second tenor vocals (1995–1998)
- Matthew Selby – vocal percussion, baritone vocals (1995–2000)
- Britt Quentin – first tenor vocals (1997–2009)
- Greg Whipple – second tenor vocals (1998–2001), first tenor vocals (2009–2010)
- Jake Moulton – vocal percussion, baritone vocals (2000–2006)
- Steve Wallace – second tenor vocals (2001–2002)
- Rudy Cardenas – second tenor vocals (2002–2007)
- Fletcher Sheridan – second tenor vocals (2007–2010), first tenor vocals (2010–2016)
- David Loucks – baritone vocals (2008–2010)
- Jarrett Johnson – second tenor vocals (2010–2016)
- Morten Kjær – baritone vocals (2010–2014)
- Kenton Chen – baritone vocals (2014–2016)
- Tracy Robertson – bass vocals (2016–2021)
- Drew Tablak – first tenor vocals (2016–2022)
- Jared Jenkins – third tenor vocals (2016)

Timeline

== Discography and recordings ==
Released	Album
1996	It's All About Harmony
1998	2
1999	The Carol Commission
2001	Jazz Sampler (EP)
2003	Limited Edition 6-Song EP (EP)
2004	Live at The Triple Door
2006	m-pact
2012	My Funny Valentine (single)
2013	I'm Your Superman (single)
2014	Signed, Sealed, Delivered I'm Yours (single)
2014	Human Nature (single)
2016	Limited Edition 6-Song Sampler (EP)
2017	Guillotine (single)
2017	Come Together (single)
2018	Wonderful World (EP)
2020	My Favorite Things (single)
2020	Where Were You In the Morning? (single)
2020	Can't Stop the Boogie (single)
2020	25 Years of Harmony, Volume 1
2020	Let it Snow (single)
2021	25 Years of Harmony, Volume 2
2021	I Do (single)
2021	Tribute to Bill Withers (single)

== Awards and nominations ==
Award	Year	Recipient(s)	Category	Result
Contemporary A Cappella Recording Award	1997	"A Change in My Life"	Best Doo-Wop / R&B Song	Won
Contemporary A Cappella Recording Award	1997	Carl Conner Kelley	Best Male Vocalist	Won
Billboard Magazine	1999	m-pact	Best Unsigned Band	Won
Contemporary A Cappella Recording Award	1999	"Fantasy"	Best Pop/Rock Cover Song	Won
Contemporary A Cappella Recording Award	2000	The Carol Commission	Best Holiday Album	Won
Contemporary A Cappella Recording Award	2000	"Caroling, Caroling"	Best Holiday Song	Won
Indie Awards	2000	The Carol Commission	Best Seasonal Album	Nominated
Seattle Music Awards	2003	m-pact	Artist of the Year	Won
Los Angeles Music Awards	2005	m-pact	Vocal Group of the Year	Won
Contemporary A Cappella Recording Award	2007	m-pact	Best Jazz Album	Won
Contemporary A Cappella Recording Award	2007	"You Need to Know"	Best Original Song	Won
Contemporary A Cappella Recording Award	2013	"My Funny Valentine"	Best Jazz Song	Nominated
Contemporary A Cappella Recording Award	2018	"Come Together"	Best R&B Song	Won
A Cappella Video Award	2018	"Guillotine"	Outstanding Video Editing	Nominated
A Cappella Video Award	2018	"Guillotine"	Best Video by a Professional Group	Nominated
A Cappella Video Award	2018	"Guillotine"	Best Hip-Hop Video	Nominated
Contemporary A Cappella Recording Award	2019	"Stay"	Best Jazz/Big Band Song	Won
Contemporary A Cappella Recording Award	2019	Wonderful World	Best Jazz/Big Band Album	Won
A Cappella Video Award	2019	"We Can Work it Out"	Outstanding Video Editing	Nominated
A Cappella Video Award	2019	"We Can Work it Out"	Best R&B Video	Nominated
A Cappella Video Award	2019	"Come Together"	Best Video by a Professional Group	Nominated
A Cappella Video Award	2019	"Come Together"	Best Jazz/Big Band Video	Won
A Cappella Video Award	2020	"Earth, Wind & Fire Medley"	Best Jazz/Big Band Video	Nominated
A Cappella Video Award	2020	"Earth, Wind & Fire Medley"	Best Live Video	Won
Contemporary A Cappella Recording Award	2021	"My Favorite Things"	Best Jazz/Big Band Song	Nominated
A Cappella Video Award	2021	"My Favorite Things"	Best Jazz/Big Band Video	Won
A Cappella Video Award	2021	"My Favorite Things"	Best Show Tune / Soundtrack Video	Won
Contemporary A Cappella Recording Award	2022	"Horangnabi"	Best Folk / World Song	Nominated
A Cappella Video Award	2022	"Can't Stop the Boogie"	Best Funk / Disco Video	Nominated
A Cappella Video Award	2022	"I Do"	Best R&B Video	Nominated
