= Razom nas bahato =

2004 single by GreenJolly

Single by GreenJolly
- Language: English, Ukrainian
- Released: 2005
- Songwriters: Roman Kalyn; Roman Kostyuk

Eurovision Song Contest 2005 entry
- Country: Ukraine
- Artists: Roman Kalyn; Roman Kostyuk
- As: GreenJolly
- Languages: English, Ukrainian
- Composers: Roman Kalyn; Roman Kostyuk
- Lyricists: Roman Kalyn; Roman Kostyuk; Mikola Kulinich

Finals performance
- Final result: 19th
- Final points: 30

Entry chronology
- ◄ "Wild Dances" (2004)
- "Show Me Your Love" (2006) ►

"Razom nas bahato" (Ukrainian: «Разом нас багато», romanized: ˈrɑzom ˈnɑz bɐˈɦɑto, lit. 'Together we are many') is a hip hop song by GreenJolly, which became the unofficial anthem of the Ukrainian Orange Revolution in 2004. The literal translation of the chorus line is "Together we are many, we cannot be defeated" (Ukrainian: Разом нас багато, нас не подолати, romanized: Razom nas bahato, nas ne podolaty).

== Background ==
The song deliberately resembles a title of a famous Chilean song of Quilapayún used by the Unidad Popular, "El pueblo unido jamás será vencido" ("The people united will never be defeated"), written by composer Sergio Ortega.

The original song was entirely in Ukrainian, and was written specifically to refer to the 2004 presidential election, even going so far as to name Presidential candidate Viktor Yushchenko by name.

== Eurovision Song Contest 2005 entry ==
The song represented Ukraine in the Eurovision Song Contest 2005. As a requirement of the song contest rules, forbidding direct political references, lyrics mentioning Yushchenko were removed. The verses were rewritten to include both Ukrainian and English lyrics, while the chorus' sentence "Razom nas bahato" was repeated in eight languages: Ukrainian, Polish, German, Spanish, Czech, French and Russian.

A group of Polish rappers created a remix of "Razom nas bahato" entitled "Jest nas wielu", that became popular in Poland.

== See also ==
- Protest song

Preceded by "Wild Dances" by Ruslana	Ukrainian entry in the Eurovision Song Contest; 2005	Succeeded by "Show Me Your Love" by Tina Karol
