= Igor Sorin =

Igor Vladimirovich Sorin
- Born: Igor Vladimirovitsch Sorin; 10 November 1969
- Origin: Moscow, Soviet Union
- Died: 4 September 1998 (age 28) Moscow, Russia
- Years active: 1995–1998

Igor Vladimirovich Sorin (Russian: Игорь Владимирович Сорин; 1969 – 1998), was a Russian poet, musician and artist. He was part of the Russian boy band Ivanushki International, which he left in 1998, striving for a solo career.

== Biography ==
Born 10 November 1969 in Moscow, Igor Sorin studied at the Moscow school No. 841. As a child, he was selected for the role of Tom Sawyer, but before the start of filming Nikita Mikhalkov asked the film crew to take another boy, Fyodor Stukov. The film's director Stanislav Govorukhin granted that request. In desperation, Igor jumped from the second floor but survived.

With Warsaw Minskoff Theatre took part in musical Metro with performances in Europe and on Broadway, New York. From 1988 to 1994 had studied in Gnesin Music School.

From 1995 to March 1998 he was a soloist in the popular group Ivanushki International. Despite the widespread popularity of the group, Sorin decided to leave in 1998 after recording the album Your letters. He was replaced by Oleg Yakovlev.

== Death and legacy ==
He died on 4 September 1998, as a result of injuries sustained in a suicide attempt three days earlier.

In 1999, Ivanushki International released compilation Фрагменты жизни ("Fragmenti iz zhizni", "Fragments of Life"), which contained his best songs with Ivanushki, songs he had written prior to joining Ivanushki, his vocal poems, and a song dedicated to him, "Я тебя никогда не забуду" ("Ya tebya nikogda ne zabudu", "I Will Never Forget You").
