= Kirill Turichenko =

- Born: Kirill Turichenko; January 13, 1983 (age 43); Odesa, Ukrainian SSR
- Genres: Pop, pop-rock, dance
- Occupations: Singer, musician, actor
- Website: KirillTurichenko.ru

Kirill Turichenko (Russian: Кирилл Туриченко), or Kyrylo Turychenko (Ukrainian: Кирило Туриченко), was born January 13, 1983, in Odesa, USSR. He is a Russian musician, singer and actor. Turichenko is a member of the Russian boy band Ivanushki International since 2013.

== Biography ==
=== Early life ===
Turichenko was born on January 13, 1983, in Odesa, Ukraine. In 1989–1997 he studied at high school no. 82, and in 1997–2000 at high school no. 37 drama class in Odesa under the direction of Olga Kashneva. In 1997 he finished a musical school where he learned to play piano. In 2004 he finished the South Ukrainian State Pedagogical University named after K.D. Ushynsky, the faculty of music and art.

As a child he was in love with music. From his early years he took part in Odesa show-team "Star Hour", which has participated in many festivals and contests.

=== Music career ===
In 1994, Turichenko took part in popular TV contests "Morning star", "Small stars" and "5 + 20". In 1995 as the participant of "Star Hour" he played a leading part in the musical "The Magic Aladdin's Lamp".

Later the art director of show-team Svetlana Vetryak had created a vocal quartet KA2U, in which Turichenko became a soloist. In 1999 this quartet has won the first award of the Second All-Ukrainian Charitable festival Black Sea games. As a result young musicians were able to perform at the Tavria Games festival – a popular music festival of Ukraine.

As a part of KA2U. Turichenko-operated for a long time with the largest and popular concert clubs of Odesa, where public gathers specially for their performances 5 days a week.

After studying in the drama school Turichenko came to grips with a theatre artist’s career. On May 7, 8, 2002 at the Odesa Music Comedy theatre a premiere of the rock-opera "Romeo and Juliet" took place, where Turichenko has played a leading part. The "Romeo and Juliet" is in the repertoire of the Odesa academical Music Comedy theatre and now. It had been played over 300 times. Turichenko became laureate of the International Competition of Actors of Operetta and Musical.

In January 2004, Turichenko was nominated for the Man of the Year award. The award for the best representatives in the opinion collected from citizens of Odesa was presented at Odesa Opera and Ballet Theatre. From August 2004, Turichenko played a leading part in a performance “The Canterville Ghost”, based on the Oscar Wilde's book.

In November 2009 took place a premiere of youth musical Siliconovaya dura.net on the stage of the Odesa academical Music Comedy theatre. One of the major parts was played by Turichenko.

The turning point in Turichenko's career began in 2005. Then, among of several thousand applicants, he has received a part in the Moscow performance, namely in Andrew Lloyd Webber`s musical "Cats". He has also perfectly recommended himself at the following qualifying contests: Pop Idol, New wave and 5 stars. The jury of one of the contests included well-known musical and theatrical producer Katerina von Gechmen-Valdek, who saw a huge who saw a huge creative potential in the upcoming artist, introduced him to Michael Topalov (producer of a popular vocal ex-duet Smash!!). In late 2005 Sergey Lazarev left and M. Topalov offered Turichenko to join the band. At the same time, the qualifying contest You're a Star, which can give a chance to participate in Eurovision Song Contest 2006, started in Ukraine. The singer has decided to try his skills there. As a result Turichenko was one of the top twelve finalists, selected among thousand applicants from all country. The Artist had to make a choice what to prefer – to work in already over-hyped Russian project or to risk and try luck in representing Ukraine at the international song contest and to conquer Europe. He moved to Kyiv and he appeared in the TV project final round, where he took second place.

After the TV contest Kyiv producers got interested in Turichenko so he started his solo career. His songs were on the top list of radio charts at the leading radio stations of Ukraine. His first music videos were his on musical TV channels of the country. He performed at some musical festivals of Ukraine, Russia and Belarus.

In May 2010, the single "4 Seasons of Love", written by Turichenko with Ray Horton, the ex-member of The Real Milli Vanilli, was presented in Ukraine. The Russian clip-maker Pavel Khudyakov and operator Maxim Osadchy shot a summer music video "4 Seasons of Love".

The singer prepared solo album, recorded at major studios in Russia and Ukraine. Mastering of the album took place in February 2011 in London Metropolis studio, which at one time Lady Gaga, Justin Timberlake, Michael Jackson and other world stars recorded their songs.

In November 2010, in Crystal Hall in Kyiv Turichenko presented his new music video "Prosti menya" /Forgive me/, directed by Katya Tsarik. The singer presented also his new concert show, which included 12 songs from the new album.

In February 2011, Turichenko signed with leading recording company in Ukraine, MOON records, to release his debut album, "Peresechenie sudeb". In just one year Turichenko fully updated his stage concert show.

Turichenko's album "Peresechenie sudeb" includes 13 songs, some of which have become successfully all-Ukrainian hits.

In August 2011, Turichenko was appreciated by music experts of show business "Crystal Microphone" award. Turichenko's album "Peresechenie sudeb" was recognized as the best in the category "Album of the Year" , and Turichenko himself as the "Idol of the year."

In 2011, he took part also in a reality television show "Survivor", becoming a finalist in the last episode of the project.

In early 2012, Turichenko became a participant of the main Ukrainian vocal show "The Voice" on 1+1 TV channel.

== Theater works ==
The theater came to Turichenko's life in his early years. When he was 13 years old his parents sent him to study at Odesa high school № 37 drama class under the direction of Olga Kashneva. Famous stars of movie and theater such as Nonna Grishaeva, Irina Apeksimova and many other studied here.

After studying at the drama school Turichenko came to grips with a theater artist’s career.

He is laureate of one theatrical award when in 2004 he became laureate of the International Competition of Actors of Operetta and Musical.

=== Rock-opera Romeo and Juliet ===
The premiere took place on May 7, 2002, on the stage of the Odesa academical Music Comedy theatre named after M.Vodyanoy. A leading part (Romeo) was played by Turichenko.

The stage director of the performance Georgiy Kovtun made the serious demands to all actors: They should not only sing, play and dance perfectly, but also execute difficult acrobatic tricks. All of these elements were dictated by scenography: two board constructions moved by the stage, transforming in imagination of spectators to locks of Montague and Capulet, to fighting vehicles, to serf towers.

The textures of the costumes used for the characters include skin, bast, mat-zamsh, and metal. The stage director and choreographer, an award recipient in Russia and international contests, intended to show power and pressure within a barbarous epoch, stating that many Shakespearean adaptations are refined. In this production, Romeo and Juliet are depicted against the power of the background.

This rock opera was sold out for every performance for many years.

=== The Canterville Ghost ===
In August on the stage of the Odesa academical Music Comedy theatre named after M.Vodyanoy took place “The Canterville Ghost” premiere, based on the same named Oscar Wilde's book. Turichenko acts a leading role again – the ghost sir Simon.

The musical was produced by the Honoured worker of Arts of Russia Georgiy Kovtun. Turichenko played a three hundred-year-old ghost.

== Discography ==
=== Peresechenie sudeb (2011) ===
Track list

#	Track	Music	Lyrics	Duration
1	Peresechenie nashih sudeb	Andrey Timoschik, Ray Horton	Dariya Nelipa	03:31
2	Zachem?	Kirill Turichenko, Andrey Timoschik	Leonid Basovich, Anna Tereschenko	04:00
3	Oblaka	Pavel Zuzin	Alex Prusov, Pavel Zuzin	03:27
4	Megdu gorodami	Pavel Aloin	Nataliya Pavlova	03:35
5	Kto podskaget?	Pavel Zuzin	Alex Prusov, Pavel Zuzin	03:23
6	Ostanovi menya	Pavel Aloin	Nataliya Pavlova	03:45
7	Bez tebya ya polovina	Andrey Timoschik, Ray Horton	Leonid Basovich	02:10
8	Prosti menya	Pavel Zuzin	Alex Prusov, Pavel Zuzin	02:55
9	Kogda my zabyli	Pavel Aloin	Nataliya Pavlova	03:19
10	Cherno-belaya	Andrey Timoschik, Ray Horton	Dariya Nelipa	03:53
11	Vse ostanetsya vdrug	Pavel Zuzin	Alex Prusov, Pavel Zuzin	03:17
12	4 Seasons of Love (original version)	Ray Horton, Andrey Timoschik	Ray Horton, Dariya Nelipa	03:41
13	4 Seasons of Love (Russian version)	Ray Horton, Andrey Timoschik	Dariya Nelipa	03:41

== Music videos ==
- 2010 : 4 Seasons of Love (in duet with Ray Horton)
- 2010 : Prosti mrenya

-	4 Seasons of Love (2010)	Prosti menya (2010)
