= Ivanushki International =

Russian boy band

Ivanushki International Иванушки International
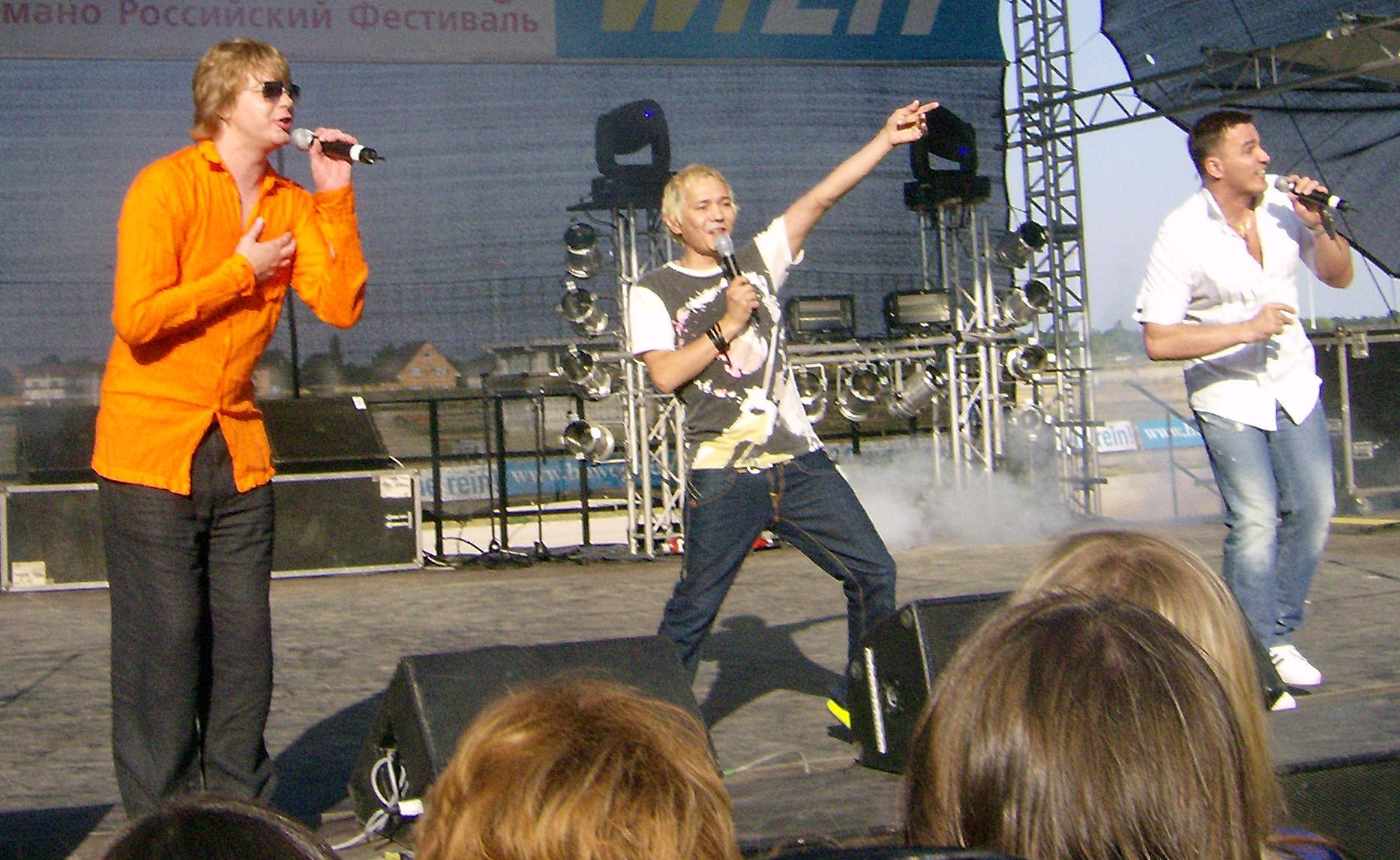
- Ivanushki International performing in Berlin, 2008

Background information
- Origin: Moscow, Russia
- Genres: Pop music, EDM
- Years active: 1995–present
- Members: Andrei Grigoriev-Apollonov; Kirill Andreev; Kirill Turichenko
- Past members: Igor Sorin (died 1998); Oleg Yakovlev (died 2017)
- Website: Official site

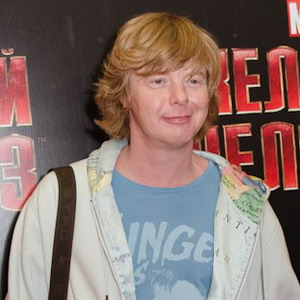
Andrei Grigoriev-Apollonov in 2013

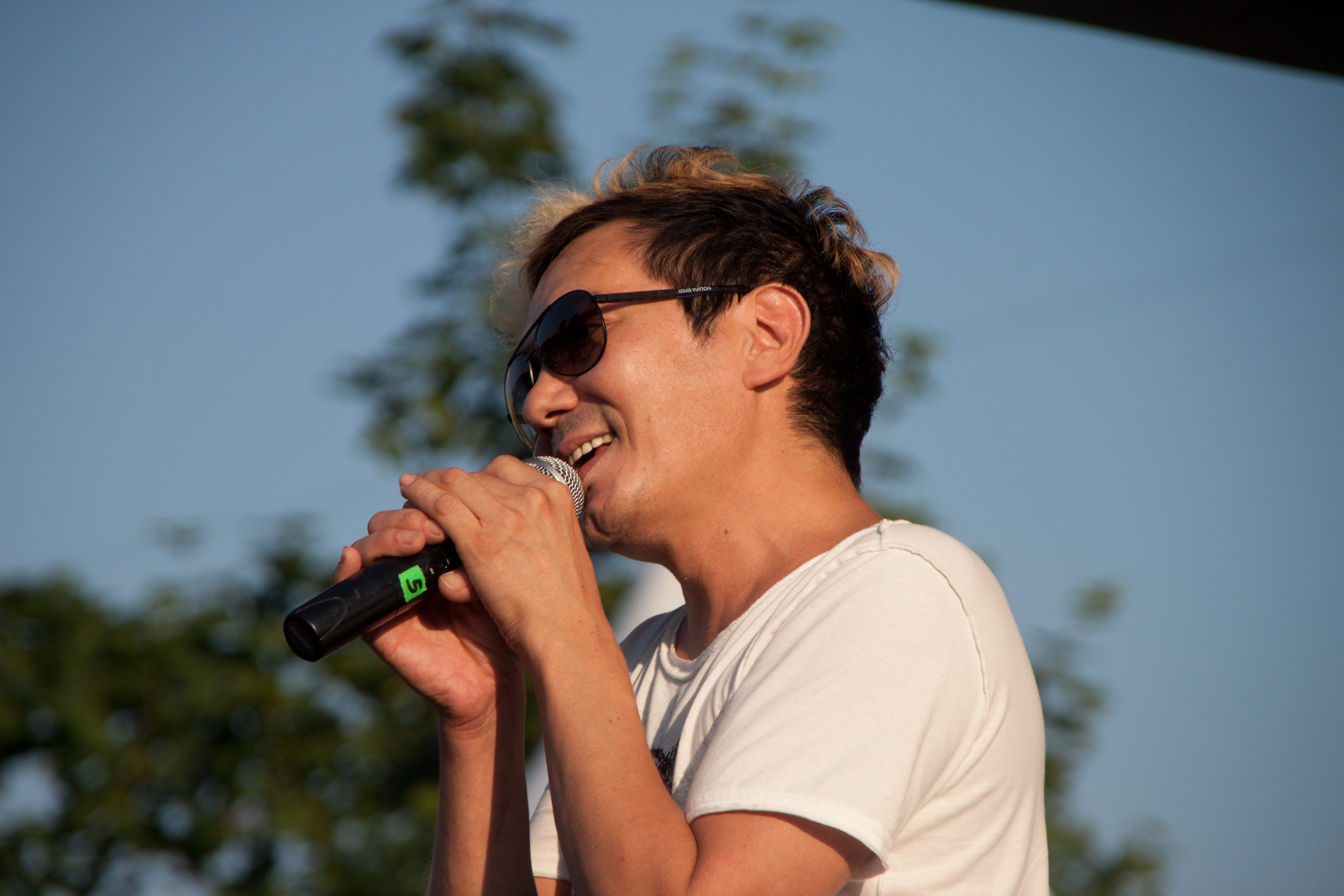
Oleg Yakovlev in 2013

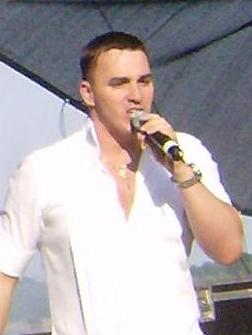
Kirill Andreev in 2008

Ivanushki International (written in Russian as "Иванушки International") is a Russian boy band founded in Moscow in 1994.

The band was conceived by record producer Igor Matviyenko, and initially consisted of Andrei Grigoriev-Apollonov, Kirill Andreev, and primary vocalist Igor Sorin. They performed under several names (such as "Apollo–Soyuz") before settling on "Ivanushki International", a name meant to represent their intended blend of Russian ("Little Ivans") and international musical influences, and itself written half in Cyrillic, half in the Latin alphabet, with the second word read as in English.

Their debut album, Конечно он (Konyechno on, Of Course It's Him), was released in 1996. It included three cover versions of songs from the 1980s – "Вселенная" (Vselennaya, "The Universe"), originally performed by Alexander Ivanov, and "Рондо" (Rondo, "Roundabout"), "Этажи" (Etazhi, "Levels"), and "Малина" ("Malina", "Raspberry") by the group Class. However, it contained several original songs, including the hits "Тучи" (Tuchi, "Clouds"), "Колечко" (Kolechko, "The Ring"), "Где-то" (Gdye-to, "Somewhere"), and "Она" (Ona, "She").

A remixed version of the album followed one year later, Konyechno on remixed. Alongside the remixed versions, the album contained the new hit "Кукла" (Kukla, "Doll") and a cover version of the Lubeh song "Дуся" (Dusya).

Ivanushki's second studio album, Твои письма (Tvoi pisma, Your Letters), released later in 1997, repeated the existing formula of original material and covers of past hits.

Later that year, Igor Sorin left to pursue a solo career, and was replaced by Oleg Yakovlev, who had appeared in the music video for "Doll".

On September 1, 1998, Sorin committed suicide, jumping from the window of his high-rise apartment, and died three days later. The following year, the group released Фрагменты жизни (Fragmenti iz zhizni, Fragments of Life), their tribute to him, which contained songs he had written prior to joining Ivanushki, as well as poems he had written, and a song dedicated to him, "Я тебя никогда не забуду" (Ya tyebya nikogda nye zabudu, "I Will Never Forget You").

Ivanushki released their first full album with Yakovlev as vocalist, Об этом я буду кричать всю ночь (Ob etom ya budu krichat' vsyu noch, I'll Shout About This All Night ), in April 1999. It was followed in 2000 by Подожди меня... (Podoshdi menya, Wait for Me), after which the group released their first compilation album, Ivanushki.Best.Ru.

Although not having any studio album since 2002, Ivanushki kept on releasing singles; The latest songs of the Ivanushki International band: Tuchi Kruche recorded together with Khabib (Clouds are Cooler, Тучи Круче) (2022), Dve Zvezdi (Two stars, Две звезды) (2022).

Former member Oleg Yakovlev died on July 1, 2017, probably due to bilateral pneumonia or AIDS-related disease.

== Discography ==
Studio albums

Transliterated title	Original title	Translation	Year of release
Konyechno on	Конечно он	Of Course It's Him	1996
Konyechno on Remix	Конечно он Remix	Of Course It's Him Remix	1997
Tvoi pisma	Твои письма	Your Letters	1997
Ob etom ya budu krichat' vsyu noch'	Об этом я буду кричать всю ночь	I'll Shout All Night About That	1999
Podoshdi menya...	Подожди меня...	Wait for Me...	2000
Oleg, Andrei, Kirill	Олег, Андрей, Кирилл	Oleg Andrei Kirill	2002

Compilation albums

Transliterated title	Original title	Translation	Year of release
Igor Sorin. Fragmenti iz zhizni	Игорь Сорин. Фрагменты из жизни	Igor Sorin. Fragments of Life	1999
Ivanushki.Best.Ru	Ivanushki.Best.Ru	Ivanushki.Best.Ru	2000
10 let vo vsyelennoi	10 лет во вселенной	Ten Years in the Universe	2005
Luschee v nashei zhizni	Лучшее в нашей жизни	Best In Our Life	2015
25 topolinnyh let	25 Тополиных лет	25 poplar years	2021

Live albums

Transliterated title	Original title	Translation	Year of release
Ivanushki International v Moskve	Иванушки International в Москве	Ivanushki International In Moscow	2001
