= Valters and Kaža =

Latvian musicians

- Origin: Latvia
- Past members: Valters Frīdenbergs; Kārlis Būmeisters

Valters and Kaža, known internationally as Walters and Kazha, were a Latvian music duo consisting of Valters Frīdenbergs and Kārlis Būmeisters. They were best known for representing Latvia in the Eurovision Song Contest 2005 with the song "The War Is Not Over", written by Mārtiņš Freimanis, finishing in fifth place with 153 points.

== Career ==
=== 2005: Eurovision Song Contest ===
On 26 February 2005, the duo were selected to represent Latvia in the Eurovision Song Contest 2005, held in Kyiv, Ukraine.

In the semi-final, which was held two days before the final, they performed fifth, following Moldova's Zdob și Zdub and preceding Monaco's Lise Darly. They qualified in tenth place with 85 points. At the after-party, Valters lost his voice and subsequently, at the dress rehearsal, he did not sing the entire song. In the grand final, he sang parts of the song one octave lower than they should've been. Despite this, they finished in fifth place with 153 points.

=== After Eurovision ===
In 2009, Valters made a solo effort to represent Latvia with his song "For A Better Tomorrow" but failed to qualify from the semi-final.

Two years later, the duo provided the Latvian commentary for the Eurovision Song Contest 2011. Valters was also Latvia's spokesperson at the Eurovision Song Contest 2012.

=== Valters Fridenbergs' death ===
On 17 October 2018, it was announced that Valters Frīdenbergs had died of a two-year long battle with cancer.

Awards and achievements
Preceded by Fomins & Kleins with "Dziesma par laimi"	Latvia in the Eurovision Song Contest; 2005	Succeeded by Vocal Group Cosmos with "I Hear Your Heart"
