= GreenJolly =

Ukrainian rap band

GreenJolly Ґринджоли
- Origin: Ivano-Frankivsk Oblast, Ukraine
- Genres: Hip hop
- Years active: 2004–2005
- Past members: Roman Kalyn; Roman Kostyuk

GreenJolly (Ukrainian: Ґринджоли, Gryndzholy) was a Ukrainian hip hop duo. They represented Ukraine at the 2005 Eurovision Song Contest with the song "Razom nas bahato", which became an unofficial anthem of the Ukrainian Orange Revolution.

== History ==
GreenJolly consisted of Roman Kalyn and Roman Kostyuk, who originate from the Ivano-Frankivsk region of Western Ukraine.

After receiving a wild card to the final of the Ukrainian Eurovision pre-selection, Evrobachennya 2005 – Natsionalyni vidbir, the duo was chosen to represent their country at the 2005 Eurovision Song Contest in Kyiv, with the song "Razom nas bahoto". In conjunction with various Ukrainian radio stations, the band wrote the song to support protests against electoral fraud that took place during the 2004 Ukrainian presidential election. However, the track had to be reworked in order to comply with contest regulations, and the European Broadcasting Union. In the final, the duo finished 19th with 30 points, tied with Sweden.

Following their Eurovision appearance, the group disbanded.

Awards and achievements
Preceded by Ruslana with "Wild Dances"	Ukraine in the Eurovision Song Contest; 2005	Succeeded by Tina Karol with "Show Me Your Love"
