= Adrian Grant (writer and producer) =

Writer and producer

Adrian Grant is a writer and theatrical producer best known for creating the hit West End stage show, Thriller – Live.

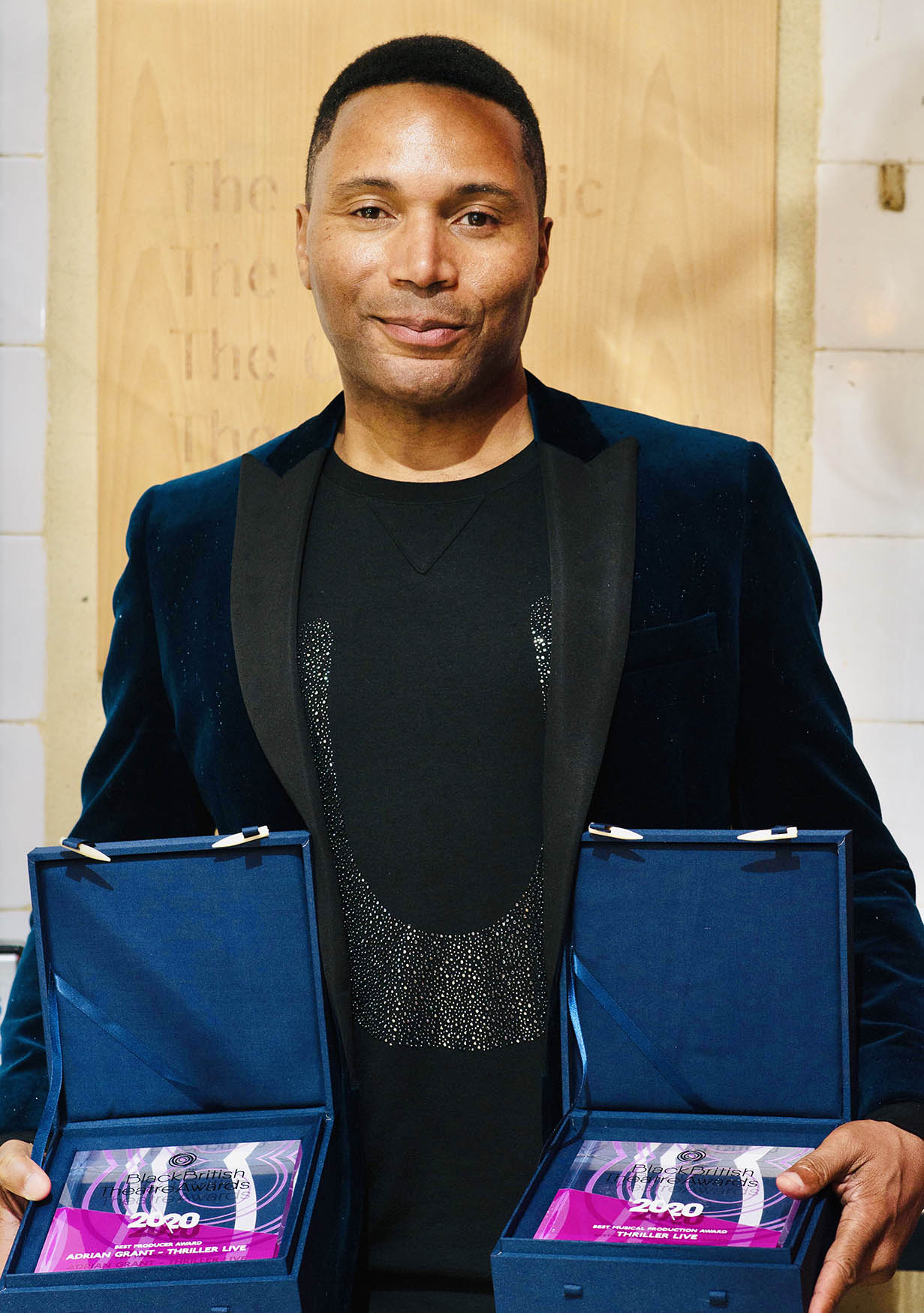
Producer and Writer: Adrian Grant

== Biography ==
Adrian was privileged with great access to Michael Jackson for over 20 years leading to the publication of three books, including the best-selling chronology Michael Jackson: A Visual Documentary: 1958–2009.

As a theatrical producer Adrian also created The Aretha Franklin Songbook and Respect La Diva.

In October 2017 Adrian received the Image Award at the Black British Business Awards for setting a record of excellence and making a lasting, significant and positive contribution to the standing of people of African and Caribbean heritage in Britain.

In November 2018 Adrian launched the Visionary Honours celebrating social impact in culture, media and entertainment.

In October 2020 Adrian received the Best Producer Award for Thriller – Live at the Black British Theatre Awards.
