= Britt Quentin =

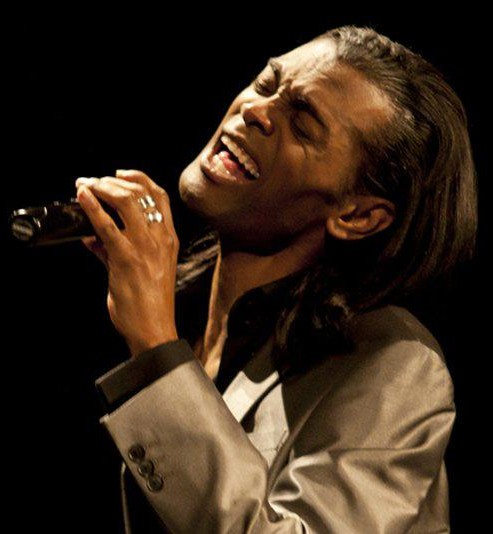
- Tallinn in December 2011

Background information
- Born: 11 July 1973 (age 52); Detroit, Michigan, USA
- Genres: vocal, pop
- Occupations: singer, writer, arranger, producer, vocal coach, director, actor, voiceover actor
- Instruments: vocals, piano, violin
- Years active: 1996–present
- Formerly of: m-pact, Thriller – Live
- Website: www.brittquentinmusic.com

Britt Quentin (born 11 July 1973) is an American artist acting as singer, writer, arranger, producer, vocal coach, director, actor, voiceover actor.

== Life and career ==
=== Early life ===
Britt Quentin is born on 11 July 1973. He grew up in Detroit, Michigan, where he studied voice, piano, classical violin for 11 years, and music education at Wayne State University.

=== M-pact years (1996–2009) ===
Britt Quentin was part of M-pact vocal group from 1996 to 2009 as artistic director. With M-pact, Britt Quentin appeared on the following records:

Released	Album
1996	It's All About Harmony
1998	2
1999	The Carol Commission
2001	Jazz Sampler (EP)
2003	Limited Edition 6-Song EP (EP)
2004	Live at The Triple Door
2006	m-pact

=== Thriller Live years (2009-now) ===
- In 2009, he was cast to be lead vocal in Thriller Live musical. He first toured in Europe and more distant countries like Korea, then was part of the west end cast in London in this show which is a tribute to Michael Jackson. Britt has been the resident director and lead vocal until May 2016.
- September to November 2016 - After 5 months away from Michael Jackson's universe, Britt Quentin is back on Thriller Live for 7 weeks of shows in Macau, China - from September 30 to November 13, 2016. The musical has been chosen to open the new Parisian Theater, from The Parisian Macao integrated resort.
- January to April 2017 - Britt Quentin is part of Thriller Live European tour. The cast is giving shows in UK, Ireland and Germany.
- April to September 2017 - Britt Quentin is the resident director and lead vocal in the second Thriller Live residence at the Parisian Theater in Macau, China.
- October to December 2017 - Britt Quentin is the resident director and lead vocal in Thriller Live UK tour from October to December 2017. This tour stops at Basingstoke, Crawley, Skegness, Dunfermline, Blackpool, Bath and Portsmouth.
- January to July 2018 - Britt Quentin is the resident director and lead vocal in Thriller Live European tour. This tour stops in UK, Germany, Denmark, Sweden, Ireland and Switzerland.
- September 2018 to Summer 2019 - Britt Quentin is the resident director and lead vocal in Thriller Live world tour. This tour stops in some European countries UK, Germany, Poland, Netherlands, Luxembourg and Austria and worldwide in Kuwait, United Arab Emirates and China.
- November 2019 to March 2020 - Britt Quentin is the resident director and lead vocal in Thriller Live world tour, performing in Saudi Arabia, Switzerland, Netherlands, UK, Sweden and Denmark. This tour was ended suddenly due to the covid-19 crisis that leads to theaters closure all over the world.

=== Others ===
- In the 1990s, he was part of a vocal trio named Chosen Vessel with Dana M. Dahlstrom and Colleen A. Gallaher. They appeared on some songs, including on Emily Danielson's CD "A Temple of Clay" in 1995, on vocal backgrounds.
- From 2002 to 2004, Britt Quentin made a few representations for the contemporary classical work "Cafe Desire", as he was cast lead counter tenor soloist.
- In 2011, Britt Quentin and Estonian Voices gave a concert at Christmas Jazz Festival.
- In 2014, Britt Quentin arranged a title for the album “One savior one voice” : “Where can I turn for peace?”. This song has been written by Emma Lou Thayne and composed by Joleen G. Meredith in 1973. “One savior one voice” project is aimed to gather many arrangers and singers together in order to produce a CD of hymns to religious gospel in different music styles (vocal jazz, R&B gospel, some Latin and rock grooves…). Bradley Hampton is behind this project.
