= Irina Rosenfeld =

Ukrainian singer (born 1988)

MISHÉLL
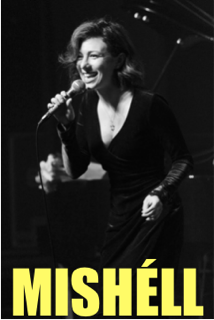
- Born: December 10, 1988 (age 37); Kerch, USSR
- Occupations: Singer, Songwriter
- Years active: 2003-present
- Known for: R&B, Soul, Jazz
- Website: mishéll.com

Irina Rosenfeld (Mishéll, born December 10, 1988) is a singer and songwriter in the genres of R&B, jazz and soul.

== Biography ==
Mishéll was born Iryna Talia Rozenfeld in 1988 in Kerch, USSR. She studied at the Kyiv International Institute of Music R.Glier and at the National Academy of Culture and Art Management. Mishéll reached twice (2006 and 2010) the final of Ukrainian national selection for Eurovision Song Contest. In 2013 she reached the finals of the musical reality TV in Ukraine "Your face sounds familiar”. In 2013 she released a show and album of Jewish songs in Hebrew and Yiddish.In 2019 Mishéll started the creative process of her new solo album. During 2021 she released two singles.

== Awards and nominations ==
Year	Nominee/work	Award	Result
2006	Ukrainian National Selection for Eurovision Song Contest		2 Place
2008	International Song Contest “New-Wave"	Special prize	2 Place
2010	Ukrainian National Selection for Eurovision Song Contest		Finalist
2013	Ukraine “Your Face Sounds Familiar” reality show		Finalist

== Discography ==
- Irene Rozenfeld
- Yiddish Hits
- Mishéll
- Tonight
- Never Be
- Is On
- OK
- #1
- Fever
- Fever-Live
