= Ukraine in the Eurovision Song Contest 2005 =

- Eurovision Song Contest 2005
- Participating broadcaster: National Television Company of Ukraine (NTU)
- Country: Ukraine
- Selection process: Yevrobachennia 2005 – Natsionalnyi vidbir
- Selection date: 27 February 2005

Competing entry
- Song: "Razom nas bahato"
- Artist: GreenJolly
- Songwriters: Roman Kalyn; Roman Kostyuk; Mikola Kulinich

Placement
- Final result: 19th, 30 points

Participation chronology

Ukraine was represented at the Eurovision Song Contest 2005 with the song "Razom nas bahato", written by Roman Kalyn, Roman Kostyuk, and Mikola Kulinich, and performed by the duo GreenJolly. The Ukrainian participating broadcaster, the National Television Company of Ukraine (NTU), organised a national final in order to select its entry for the contest. In addition, NTU was also the host broadcaster and staged the event at the Palace of Sports in Kyiv, after winning the previous edition with the song "Wild Dances" performed by Ruslana.

Seventy-five entries competed in the national selection which consisted of sixteen shows: fifteen semi-finals and a final. Nineteen entries qualified to compete in the final, held on 27 February 2005, where "Razom nas bahato" performed by GreenJolly was selected as the winner after gaining the most public televotes with 2,247 votes. The Ukrainian entry caused controversy due to governmental involvement in directly qualifying GreenJolly to the final of the national selection as a wildcard based on their participation in the Orange Revolution, and alleged political overtones of the song "Razom nas bahato". The European Broadcasting Union (EBU) cleared the song for the competition after changing the lyrics.

As the host country, Ukraine qualified to compete directly in the final of the Eurovision Song Contest. Performing in position 16 during the final, Ukraine placed nineteenth out of the 24 participating countries with 30 points.

== Background ==
Prior to the 2005 contest, the National Television Company of Ukraine (NTU) had participated in the Eurovision Song Contest representing Ukraine two times since its first entry in 2003, winning it in 2004 with the song "Wild Dances" performed by Ruslana. Its least successful result had been 14th place, which they achieved in 2003, with the song "Hasta la Vista" performed by Oleksandr Ponomaryov.

As part of its duties as participating broadcaster, NTU organises the selection of its entry in the Eurovision Song Contest and broadcasts the event in the country. NTU confirmed its intentions to participate at the 2005 contest on 29 April 2004. The broadcaster had used internal selections in order to select its 2003 and 2004 entries. Along with their participation confirmation, it was announced that NTU would organise a national final for the first time to select its 2005 entry.

== Before Eurovision ==
=== Yevrobachennia 2005 – Natsionalnyi vidbir ===
The Ukrainian national final consisted of fifteen semi-finals held between 14 November 2004 and 20 February 2005 and a final on 27 February 2005. All shows in the competition took place at the NTU Studios in Kyiv, hosted by Maria Orlova and broadcast on Pershyi Natsionalnyi.

==== Format ====
The selection of the competing entries for the national final and ultimately the Ukrainian Eurovision entry took place over three stages. In the first stage, artists and songwriters had the opportunity to apply for the competition. Seventy-five acts were selected and announced on 12 October 2004. The second stage consisted of the televised semi-finals which took place between 14 November 2004 and 20 February 2005 with five acts competing in each show. The winner of each semi-final was selected to advance based on a public televote. The third stage was the final, which took place on 27 February 2005 and featured the fifteen acts that qualified from the semi-finals vying to represent Ukraine in Kyiv as well as an additional four wildcard entries that directly qualified to the final. The winner was selected solely via a public televote. Viewers participating in the public televote during the sixteen live shows had the opportunity to submit their votes for the participating entries via telephone or SMS.

==== Competing entries ====
Artists and composers had the opportunity to submit their entries between 1 August 2004 and 20 September 2004, which was later extended to 8 October 2004. A seven-member selection panel consisting of Olena Mozgova (director of music and entertainment at NTU), Volodymyr Orlov (general director of OTV), Eduard Klim (general director of Lavina Music), Serhiy Kuzin (general director of HIT-FM), Oleg Vergelis (editor at the newspaper Kievskiye Vedomosti), Andriy Sokolovskyi (editor at the newspaper Komsomolska pravda v Ukrayini) and Oleksandr Ksenofontov (music producer) reviewed the 527 received submissions and shortlisted 75 entries to compete in the national final. On 12 October 2004, the 75 selected competing acts were announced. The seventy-five acts were allocated to one of fifteen semi-finals during a draw that took place on 3 November. The four wildcard finalists: De Shifer, GreenJolly, Mandry and Tartak, were announced on 24 February 2005.

==== Semi-finals ====
The fifteen semi-finals took place between 14 November 2004 and 20 February 2005. The performances of the 75 entries were filmed earlier on 30 and 31 October 2004. In each semi-final five acts competed and the winner advanced to the final of the competition as determined by a public televote, while the remaining four entries were eliminated.

Semi-final 1 – 14 November 2004
R/O	Artist	Song	Televote	Place
1	Stand.Up	"Vidlitay" (Відлітай)	30.70%	1
2	Vkhid u Zminnomu Vzutti	"Dvirnyk" (Двірник)	18.62%	3
3	Alyona Omargaliyeva	"Ty ne so mnoy" (Ты не со мной)	18.93%	2
4	Daryna Sumska	"My z toboyu" (Ми з тобою)	17.74%	4
5	Anna Olga	"Sudyat po glazam" (Судят по глазам)	14.01%	5

Semi-final 2 – 21 November 2004
R/O	Artist	Song	Televote	Place
1	Potap	"Petya" (Петя)	12.79%	5
2	NeDilya	"My Angel"	29.57%	1
3	Inesh	"Troyanda" (Троянда)	27.49%	2
4	Kishe	"Ty sama ne svoya" (Ты сама не своя)	15.20%	3
5	Maya	"Karma"	14.95%	4

Semi-final 3 – 28 November 2004
R/O	Artist	Song	Televote	Place
1	Tayana	"Ottay" (Оттай)	21.64%	1
2	Radio SSB	"Play"	19.15%	5
3	Yulia Pryadko	"Ty prosto yest' v moyey sud'be" (Ты просто есть в моей судьбе)	19.50%	3
4	Mykhailo Sanin	"Ya vernus" (Я вернусь)	19.26%	4
5	Yulia Zabrodska	"Na Ivana, na Kupala" (На Івана, на Купала)	20.45%	2

Semi-final 4 – 5 December 2004
R/O	Artist	Song	Televote	Place
1	Ex-Presidenti	"Nochnoy gorod" (Ночной город)	26.04%	1
2	Natasha Radko	"Sexy Girl"	13.18%	5
3	Lesya Gorova	"Malenka ptashka" (Маленька пташка)	20.03%	3
4	Olga Heka	"Love Triangle"	16.38%	4
5	Fedor	"Chto v imeni tvoyem" (Что в имени твоем)	24.37%	2

Semi-final 5 – 12 December 2004
R/O	Artist	Song	Televote	Place
1	Yurcash	"Patriot"	25.13%	1
2	Kalich	"Apelsinoviy ranok" (Апельсиновий ранок)	17.52%	4
3	Anita Gezo	"Polechu" (Полечу)	20.05%	3
4	Alina Starodumova	"Groza" (Гроза)	20.13%	2
5	Via Harli	"Shlyah" (Шлях)	17.17%	5

Semi-final 6 – 19 December 2004
R/O	Artist	Song	Televote	Place
1	Ivanka Milay	"Ty ne moy" (Ты не мой)	23.98%	2
2	SheOna	"I Say"	15.76%	4
3	Khvylyu Trymay	"Lito proyshlo" (Літо пройшло)	16.08%	3
4	Tiana Ravi	"Pozavchora" (Позавчора)	28.71%	1
5	Katerina	"Blues"	15.47%	5

Semi-final 7 – 26 December 2004
R/O	Artist	Song	Televote	Place
1	Foxy	"Zaberi menya" (Забери меня)	27.00%	1
2	Eliksyr	"Ne toy buv den'" (Не той був день)	15.65%	5
3	Yulia Boday	"Richka" (Річка)	21.23%	2
4	Kapinos	"Koshka" (Кошка)	17.24%	4
5	Igor Balan	"Storm"	18.88%	3

Semi-final 8 – 2 January 2005
R/O	Artist	Song	Televote	Place
1	Yulia Klim	"Spogad" (Спогад)	15.36%	3
2	Viktor Pavlik	"Svit za viknom" (Світ за вікном)	30.79%	1
3	Pomaranch	"Ochi" (Очі)	15.05%	4
4	Marina Kuzmina	"Yamayka" (Ямайка)	14.85%	5
5	Olenka	"Ya tobi ne viru" (Я тобі не віру)	23.95%	2

Semi-final 9 – 9 January 2005
R/O	Artist	Song	Televote	Place
1	Zoryana Skirko	"Nebo" (Небо)	16.13%	3
2	Arthur Kulpovych	"Pour toi"	14.40%	5
3	Iryna Fedyshyn	"Zironka" (Зіронька)	24.37%	2
4	Protivogaz	"Pup" (Пуп)	14.98%	4
5	Serhiy Gavrilov	"Paperoviy choven" (Паперовий човен)	30.12%	1

Semi-final 10 – 16 January 2005
R/O	Artist	Song	Televote	Place
1	Daleko	"Znaky pitannya" (Знаки питання)	27.11%	1
2	Konstantin Pona	"My Crazy World"	16.37%	5
3	Boris Glibov	"Yunaya vesna" (Юная весна)	21.49%	2
4	A-ERA	"Vse resheno" (Все решено)	18.34%	3
5	Gyndul Mytsei	"La chokana"	16.69%	4

Semi-final 11 – 23 January 2005
R/O	Artist	Song	Televote	Place
1	Ani Lorak	"A Little Shot of Love"	31.18%	1
2	Orkestr Yanky Kozyr	"Ya ne budu kavu pyla" (Я не буду каву пила)	15.97%	4
3	Kenzano	"Osen" (Осень)	15.35%	5
4	Oleksandr Nikoryak	"Snega" (Снега)	20.10%	2
5	Olena Synchuk	"Ne obeshay" (Не обещай)	17.40%	3

Semi-final 12 – 30 January 2005
R/O	Artist	Song	Televote	Place
1	Talita Kum	"Lovy mene" (Лови мене)	29.61%	1
2	Alina Gornostaeva	"Namysto" (Намисто)	13.29%	5
3	Nazar Savko and Iryna Fedyshyn	"Ne dlya tebe" (Не для тебе)	23.51%	2
4	The Best	"Vse devchoki" (Все девчоки)	13.74%	4
5	Iryna Yaryna	"Pisnya kohannya" (Пісня кохання)	19.85%	3

Semi-final 13 – 6 February 2005
R/O	Artist	Song	Televote	Place
1	Roman Polonsky feat. Sotger	"You Are for Me Like a Star"	21.17%	2
2	Katya Popova	"Luna" (Луна)	16.78%	4
3	Marina Lavryshcheva	"Divchyna-lito" (Дівчина-літо)	13.83%	5
4	Lourdes	"Veter" (Ветер)	27.43%	1
5	Mandarinoviy Ray	"Namysto" (Намисто)	20.79%	3

Semi-final 14 – 13 February 2005
R/O	Artist	Song	Televote	Place
1	Yulia Korzhynska	"Freedom"	27.42%	1
2	Oksana Rudyk	"Zironka" (Зіронька)	22.06%	2
3	Artem	"Oy..." (Ой...)	15.12%	5
4	Veronika	"Prosti" (Прости)	16.13%	4
5	Emotions	"Angels"	19.27%	3

Semi-final 15 – 20 February 2005
R/O	Artist	Song	Televote	Place
1	Tetyana Liberman	"Mozhet byt da" (Может быть да)	19.87%	4
2	Igor Kruglov	"Macho-piligrim" (Мачо-пилигрим)	14.35%	5
3	Nota-Neo	"Poyikhala baba v lis" (Поїхала баба в ліс)	21.30%	2
4	Volya	"Zemlya rodnaya" (Земля родная)	24.35%	1
5	Alevtina Leontyeva	"Solnyshko" (Солнышко)	20.13%	3

==== Final ====
The final took place on 27 February 2005. The show was scheduled to take place at the Palace of Sports in Kyiv, however such plans were cancelled due to insufficient funding. The fifteen entries that qualified from the semi-finals and the four wildcard finalists competed, with NeDilya, Sergei Gavrilov and Viktor Pavlik performing their entries in a different language than in the semi-finals. The winner, "Razom nas bahato" performed by GreenJolly, was selected exclusively through a public televote. 6,378 votes were registered by the televote during the show. In addition to the performances of the competing entries, guests included Yulia Zabrodska, Fedor, Deema, Yulia Boday and 2005 Belarusian Eurovision entrant Angelica Agurbash performing the 2005 Belarusian entry "Boys and Girls".

Final – 27 February 2005
R/O	Artist	Song	Televote	Place
1	Stand.Up	"Vidlitay" (Відлітай)	139	8
2	NeDilya	"Bezmezhniy svit" (Безмежний світ)	54	13
3	Tayana	"Ottay" (Оттай)	19	17
4	Mandry	"Doroha" (Дорога)	142	7
5	Ex-Presidenti	"Nochnoy gorod" (Ночной город)	41	14
6	Yurcash	"Patriot"	342	3
7	Tiana Ravi	"Pozavchora" (Позавчора)	19	17
8	De Shifer	"Chas priyshov" (Час прийшов)	341	6
9	Foxy	"Zaberi menya" (Забери меня)	23	15
10	Viktor Pavlik	"I Never Loved You"	60	12
11	Serhiy Gavrilov	"Korabli" (Кораблі)	15	19
12	Tartak	"Nashe lito" (Наше літо)	342	3
13	Daleko	"Znaky pitannya" (Знаки питання)	110	9
14	Ani Lorak	"A Little Shot of Love"	1,952	2
15	Talita Kum	"Lovy mene" (Лови мене)	105	10
16	Lourdes	"Veter" (Ветер)	23	15
17	Yulia Korzhynska	"Freedom"	62	11
18	Volya	"Zemlya rodnaya" (Земля родная)	342	3
19	GreenJolly	"Razom nas bahato" (Разом нас багато)	2,247	1

=== Controversy ===
==== Accusations of rigging ====
Following the Ukrainian national final, runner-up Ani Lorak launched a protest against the final results and challenged the legitimacy of the results, alleging that the phone lines for her entry was blocked. Solvo International, which organised the televoting, denied the information that there was a falsification of the results and stated that "the results correspond to reality." In addition, Lorak's producer Yuri Falyosa stated that "the political situation won instead of music", referring to the four final wildcards (one of them being GreenJolly) that were added just a week before the show by the Government of Ukraine based on their participation in the Orange Revolution that ended in January 2005. Vitaly Zhuravsky, leader of Christian-Democratic Party of Ukraine, also criticized inclusion of four wildcards stating that it's "a gross violation of the rules of the competition". In response, producer of the national final Olena Mozgova defended the choice of GreenJolly as the Ukrainian Eurovision representative, while stating that the decision to include wildcards as a way for new names and music that emerged after the Orange Revolution to be heard was "quite a healthy proposal", and was not opposed by any of the fifteen finalists that qualified from the semi-finals.

==== Lyrical subject matter controversy ====
In March 2005, it was reported that "Razom nas bahato" appeared to have violated two of the Eurovision Song Contest rules. Firstly, it was openly derivative of an older revolutionary song, and therefore was arguably not an original composition, and secondly, the lyrics could be classed as political propaganda. After changing the lyrics at the request of the European Broadcasting Union (EBU), the song was deemed eligible for the contest.

=== Preparation and promotion ===
The official music video of "Razom nas bahato", directed by Andrey Novoselov and Vitaly Kokoshka and filmed at the Theater Studio "Kryla" in Lviv, was released on 30 March. A maxi-single, featuring additional mixes, was also released on the same day to promote the song as the Ukrainian Eurovision entry.

== At Eurovision ==
According to Eurovision rules, all nations with the exceptions of the host country, the "Big Four" (France, Germany, Spain and the United Kingdom) and the ten highest placed finishers in the 2004 contest are required to qualify from the semi-final in order to compete for the final; the top ten countries from the semi-final progress to the final. As the host country, Ukraine automatically qualified to compete in the final on 20 May 2006. In addition to their participation in the final, Ukraine is also required to broadcast and vote in the semi-final on 18 May 2006. Ukraine placed nineteenth in the final, scoring 30 points.

In Ukraine, both the semi-final and the final were broadcast on Pershyi Natsionalnyi with commentary by actor, radio DJ and voice-over narrator Yaroslav Chornenkyi. The two shows were also broadcast via radio on the National Radio of Ukraine with commentary by presenter Galyna Babiy. NTU appointed Maria Orlova as its spokesperson to announce the Ukrainian votes during the final.

=== Voting ===
Below is a breakdown of points awarded to Ukraine and awarded by Ukraine in the semi-final and grand final of the contest. The nation awarded its 12 points to Moldova in the semi-final and the final of the contest.

==== Points awarded to Ukraine ====
Points awarded to Ukraine (Final)
Score	Country
12 points	Poland
10 points	
8 points	Moldova
7 points	Portugal
6 points	
5 points	
4 points	
3 points	
2 points	Russia
1 point	Spain

==== Points awarded by Ukraine ====
Points awarded by Ukraine (Semi-final)
Score	Country
12 points	Moldova
10 points	Hungary
8 points	Poland
7 points	Croatia
6 points	Norway
5 points	Israel
4 points	Belarus
3 points	Slovenia
2 points	Latvia
1 point	Romania

Points awarded by Ukraine (Final)
Score	Country
12 points	Moldova
10 points	Malta
8 points	Croatia
7 points	Israel
6 points	Norway
5 points	Switzerland
4 points	Russia
3 points	Serbia and Montenegro
2 points	Hungary
1 point	Latvia
