= Thriller – Live =

Musical by various artists

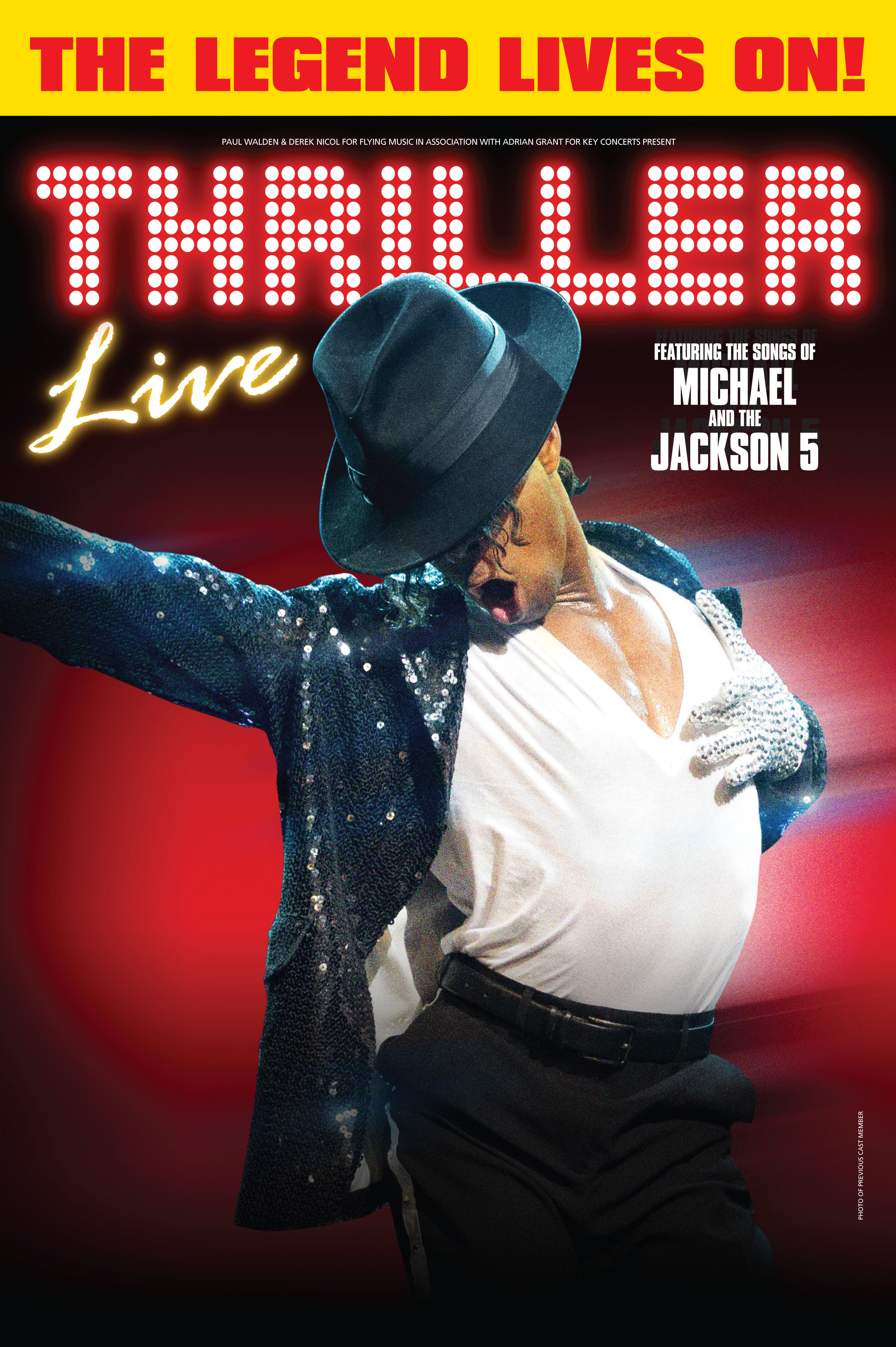
- Music: Various artists
- Lyrics: Various artists
- Book: Adrian Grant
- Basis: The music of The Jackson 5 and Michael Jackson
- Productions: 2007 United Kingdom; 2007 Scandinavia; 2008 United Kingdom; 2008 Netherlands; 2009 West End; 2009 United Kingdom; 2009 Europe; 2010 China; 2010 South Africa; 2010 United Kingdom; 2011 Europe; 2011 Singapore; 2012 Europe; 2012 Japan; 2015/16 Europe; 2016 Egypt/Israel; 2016 Macau; 2017 Europe; 2017 Macau; 2018 Europe; 2019 United Kingdom/Saudi Arabia; 2020 Denmark/Europe

Thriller Live is a two-and-a-half-hour concert revue celebrating the music of The Jackson 5 and the solo work and life of Michael Jackson. It had already been performed in the United Kingdom, Germany, the Netherlands and Scandinavia before opening at the Lyric Theatre, London, on 21 January 2009. The show was conceived by Jackson family friend and author Adrian Grant.

== Background ==
Adrian Grant started a British fan club in 1988, and then Jackson invited him out to Los Angeles when he was recording Dangerous. Within a few years the fan club had grown to 25,000 subscribed members. This led to an annual Michael Jackson tribute show in the United Kingdom from 1991; Jackson attended the tenth anniversary event. Each tribute show attracted anywhere from 1,000 to 3,000 people. Grant also wrote three books, including Michael Jackson – The Visual Documentary which was approved by the singer. Jackson was never involved with the production of Thriller – Live, but he wished Grant luck with the production.

== Productions ==
In August 2006, Thriller – Live was previewed in the United Kingdom, at the Dominion Theatre. The show was originally directed and choreographed by Kerys Nathan and with additional choreography by LaVelle Smith Jr. The following year, Grant, backed by Flying Music, began production for a UK Tour featuring the talents of Shaheen Jafargholi depicting the young Michael in the Jackson 5. The adult singers included Pop Idol star Zoe Birkett and Filipino-Australian vocalist Mig Ayesa. The show played a successful set of dates throughout May and June 2007, and later that year it toured in Europe.

Production for the West End version began in 2008, when open auditions were held to find a young actor to play Jackson. Ultimately six people would play the singer, going through the various stages of his career, with a total cast of 21 individuals, including Denise Pearson. Gary Lloyd directed and choreographed the show.

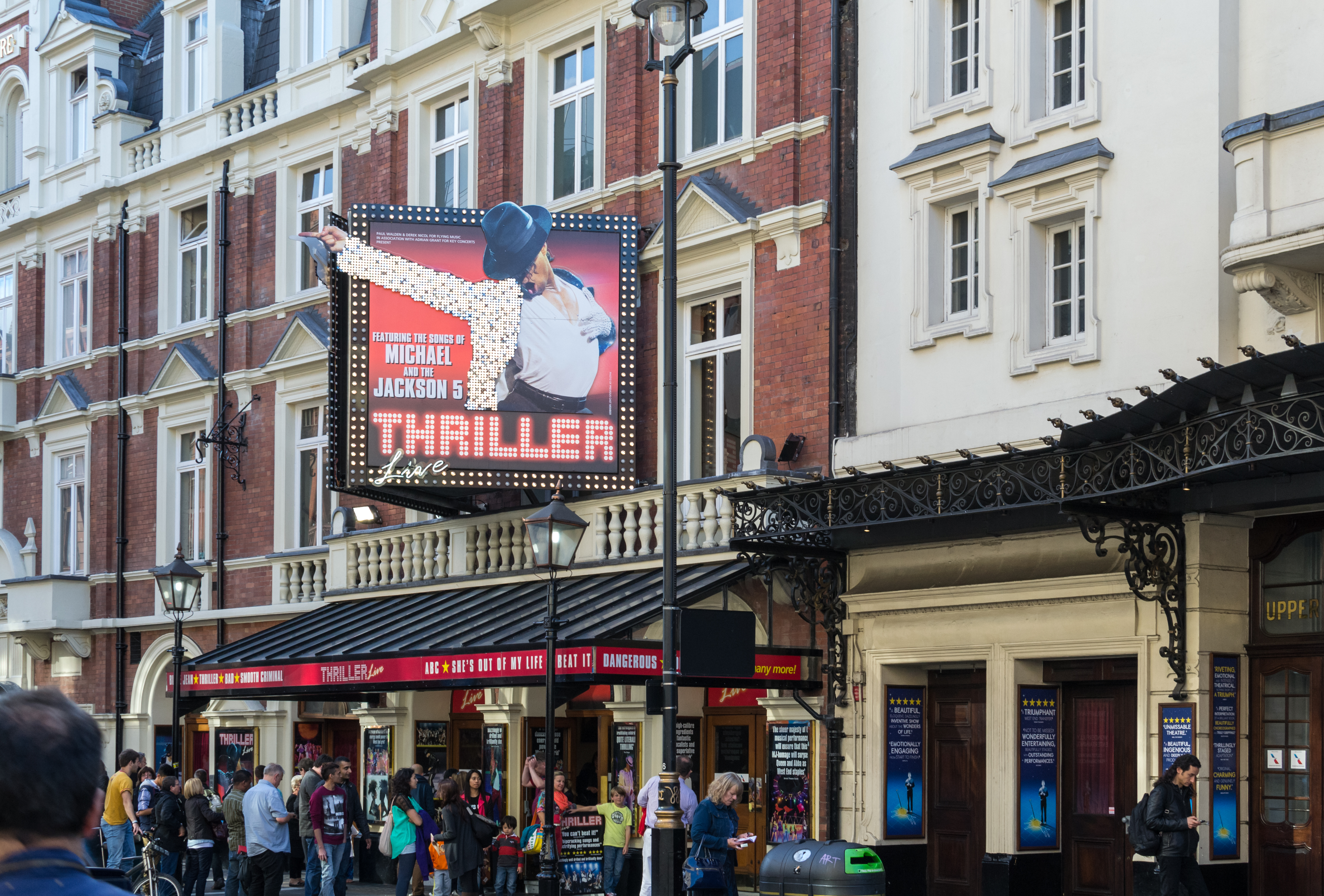
Thriller – Live at the Lyric Theatre, London in 2013.

The West End premiere was on 21 January 2009, at London’s Lyric Theatre in Shaftesbury Avenue. Tito Jackson and other celebrities attended the premiere. La Toya Jackson attended the after show party. Thriller – Live was originally scheduled to run until 16 May 2009, but this date was extended several times following wide public interest, especially after Jackson's death on June 25, 2009. In September 2014, it became the 20th longest-running musical in West End. In October 2019 it was announced that the show would close in April 2020. The show closed prematurely on 15 March 2020 due to the theatre's closure as a result of the COVID-19 pandemic.

Thriller – Live played in Singapore at the Marina Bay Sands, Grand Theater, in May 2011.

== Commentary ==
Karen Fricker of Variety expressed the opinion that the musical had "remarkably high production value" but was too long. Fricker continued, "Jackson's hits sung by four strong-voiced, charismatic leads, backed by a crackerjack team of singer-dancers—is effective and entertaining". Sanjoy Roy of The Guardian observed, "It's cute, kicking and retro, but also highlights a danger that looms large in this show: that even as a tot, Jackson was supremely gifted performer—both as a singer and a dancer—and this tribute, however well intended, inevitably pales by comparison." Paul Vale of The Stage stated, "Those looking for history of Jackson's personal life should look elsewhere as this theatrical extravaganza is a breathtaking celebration of a musician whose work spans over three decades... Jonathan Park's set design and Nigel Catmur's lighting are complimented [sic] by LED screens creating some wonderful theatrical set pieces that are simple and yet remarkably effective". Benedict Nightingale of The Times said of one performer, "What [he] lacks in physical similarity to Jackson he also lacks vocally. The coarse, sandy qualities of his voice are as suited to "Rock with You" as custard is on a steak".

Charles Spencer of The Daily Telegraph commented, "Gary Lloyd, who doubles as director and choreographer, keeps the energy level at fever pitch almost throughout, and his dance routines, featuring daring leaps from an on-stage bridge, break-dancing, and, yes, the moonwalk, are spectacular. There is also a terrific band, ranging with aplomb from funk, soul and disco, through candy-rush pop to guitar-led rock". Malcolm Jack of The Scotsman noted that, "Some of Jackson's best numbers - "Don't Stop 'Til You Get Enough", "Wanna Be Startin' Somethin'" and "Beat It" - were treated rather underwhelmingly, but the faithful(ish) to the video centrepieces - "Smooth Criminal", "Billie Jean" and "Thriller" - were fairly spectacular".

Amber Windsor of This Is Local London said of her experience at one show, "The signature high-pitched yee hee' echoed from the foyer and it was endearing to see a young boy recreating Michael's signature moonwalk, proving Jackson's music still appeals to all ages...The stage was vibrantly brought to life by the dancers, easily the strongest element of Thriller Live. Their endless energy and clear passion for the music reflected Jackson's own style". Mel Bradley of Dinnington Guardian recalled his enthusiasm and enjoyment while observing the musical, despite not being an "ardent fan of the king of pop". Julie Carpenter of Daily Express stated, "...this is a hugely enjoyable, gloriously upbeat, high-energy show which leaves you chanting Annie, are you OK? Are you OK, Annie? as you slip out the door".

On June 21, 2010, six performers in the West End of London show Thriller – Live released "Speechless" as a single with the official name "Speechless – A Tribute to Michael Jackson" to commemorate the one-year anniversary of Jackson's death. All proceeds from the recording were donated to the charity War Child.

=== "Speechless – A Tribute to Michael Jackson" Personnel ===
- Written and originally produced by Michael Jackson
- Produced, edited and mixed by Dave Loughran
- Executive producer: Adrian Grant for Key Concerts & Entertainment
- Vocal arrangement by John Maher
- Music arranged and performed by Dave Loughran
- Hammond organ performed by John Maher
- Lead vocals: James Anderson, Jean-Mikhael Baque, Kieran Alleyne, Kuan Frye, Mitchell Zhangazha, MJ Mytton-Sanneh
- Choir: Britt Quentin, Hope Lyndsey Plumb, J Rome, Jenessa Qua, Linda John-Pierre, Olamide Oshinowo, Paul Clancy, Terrence Ryan, Wayne Anthony-Cole
- Mastered by Steve Kitch

== Setlist ==
Act I

- Overture: "HIStory"
- Opening Mashup: "Don't Stop 'Til You Get Enough"/"Billie Jean"
- "Who's Lovin' You"
- "I'll Be There"
- "I Want You Back"
- "ABC"
- "Rockin' Robin"
- "Blame It on the Boogie"
- "Shake Your Body (Down to the Ground)"
- "Remember the Time"
- "Human Nature"
- "This Place Hotel"
- "Dangerous"
- "She's Out of My Life"
- "Off the Wall"
- "Get on the Floor"
- "Rock with You"
- "Don't Stop 'Til You Get Enough" (Reprise)
- "Can You Feel It"

Act II

- Entr'acte Mashup: "Wanna Be Startin' Somethin'"/"Workin' Day and Night"
- "Dancing Machine"
- "P.Y.T. (Pretty Young Thing)"
- "Beat It"
- "The Way You Make Me Feel"
- "I Just Can't Stop Loving You"
- "Smooth Criminal"
- "Dirty Diana"
- "Man in the Mirror"
- "They Don't Care About Us"
- "Earth Song"
- "Earth Song" (Instrumental)
- "Billie Jean"
- "Thriller"
- "Bad"
- "Black or White"
- Finale: "Smooth Criminal"/"Thriller" (Reprise)

Performances in Brazil featured "Human Nature" after "I Just Can't Stop Loving You"

The international tour sometimes replaces "Human Nature" with "Never Can Say Goodbye".

== Cast ==
=== London West End 2018 ===
Cast Changeover: 29 May 2018

- Vocalist: Kieran Alleyne
- Vocalist: Charlotte Berry
- Vocalist: Wayne Anthony-Cole
- Vocalist: Vivienne Ekwulugo
- Vocalist: Haydon Eshun
- Vocalist: David Julien
- Vocalist: Jonah Mayor
- Vocalist: John Moabi
- Vocalist: Florivaldo Mossi
- Swing Dancer and Resident Director: Aisling Duffy
- Swing Dancer and Dance Captain: Ebony Clarke
- Swing Dancer: Vivian Gayle
- Swing Dancer: Simone Moncada
- Dancer and Vocalist Cover: David Devyne
- Dancer: Daniel Blessing
- Dancer: Filippo Coffano
- Dancer: Joel Ekperigin
- Dancer: Eliza Hart
- Dancer: Leona Lawrenson
- Dancer: Mari Macleod
- Dancer: Oskarina O’Sullivan
- Dancer: Zinzile Tshuma
- Dancer: Matt Vjestica
- Vocalist: Triple Calz
- Vocalist: Isaiah Mason
- Vocalist: Xhanti Mbonzongwana
- Vocalist: Christian Posso
- Vocalist: Jay-Jay Prince
