= Z-Scars =

Latvian musical group

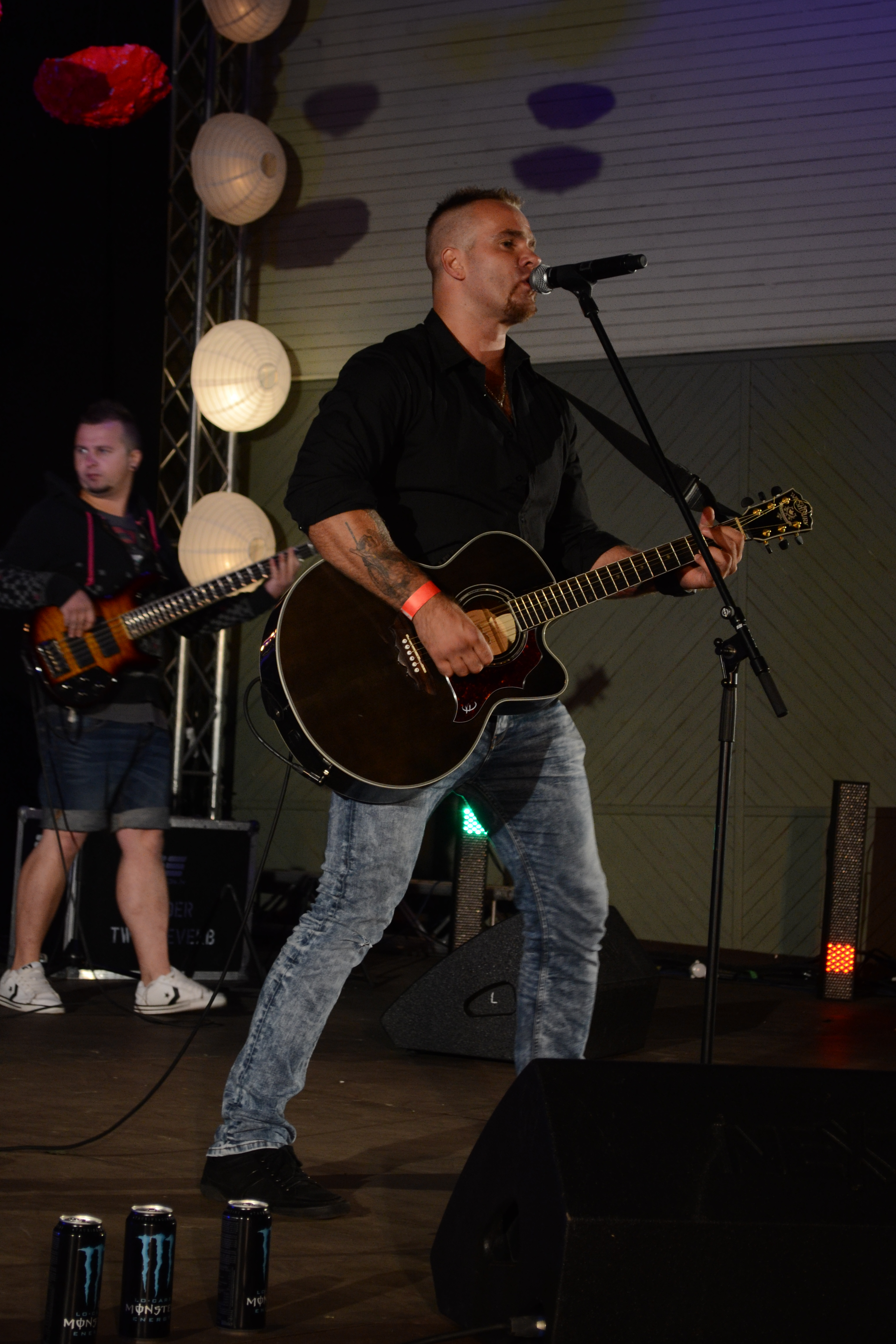
- Band member Andris Kivičs

Background information
- Origin: Riga, Latvia
- Genres: Rock
- Years active: 2001–present
- Labels: Avantis
- Members: Andris Kivičs; Reinis Brigis
- Past members: Arturs Saicans, Janis Sokolovs, Arturs Koris from July 2007 till 2008, Marcis Auzins, Haralds Stenclavs, Toms Veismanis, Martins Opmanis
- Website: Z-Scars.lv

Z-Scars is a Latvian rock band.

Z-Scars was founded in February, 2001. The band has become one of the most popular rock bands in Latvia in the short period of time. Their songs have been in the top 3 positions of many radio stations all around Latvia since the end of 2002.

Their popularity and public’s recognition are one of the tremendous success stories in Latvian music industry. Their destiny drastically changed for the better when their song “If you are alone” became the song number 1 in one of the most important and influential Latvian radio tops - Radio SWH Top 40.

Z-Scars leader Andris Kivičs is a very popular person in Latvia. Interviews with him regularly appear in Latvian media in late years paparazzi loves him because of his rude behaviour on social media. He was the host of the TV programme “Date” on LTV1 and the host of the TV programme “SeMS with Avantis” on LTV7.

== Success story ==
The debut album "Starp tevi un mani" (“Between you and me”) released in December, 2003 was a huge success. The first edition was sold out quickly due to their great popularity and the media attention. The bands interviews appeared in dozens of the magazines, Latvian dailies. Because of this success Z-Scars has definitely become one of the most popular rock bands in Latvia.

Publishing company and partner organization: Avantis

Single "Tu tuvojies sev" (“You approach yourself”) released in the summer, 2003 - sold out. Song "Ja tu esi viens" (“If you are alone”) – 1st. place in common Latvian music top, the summer of 2003. Single "Tu tuvojies sev" (“You approach yourself”) was specifically written as the theme song for the documentary “Found in America”/"Atrasts Amerikā" (also produced by Avantis). Both gained tremendous popularity in the summer of 2003.

Z-Scars second album "Pasakas un reklāmas" ("Tales and advertisements") released in June, 2005. This album style is harder than previous.

On 30 May 2008 Z-Scars presented their third album "Tieši sirdī//Прямо в сердце" ("Directly in the heart"), which is in Latvian, Russian and English.

Six singles already are playing on the radio - "Cauri pilsētai" (Through city), "Trīs vārdi" (Three words), "Izģērbies" (Take off your clothes), "Way back home", "Ziemassvētku sapņi" (Christmas dreams) and "Nebaidies un viss" (Don't be afraid and that's all). They 2 songs have been played on the Russian radio with good results on the top.

== Winners ==
3rd place in Radio SWH Latvian Music Top competition in January 2005. The winners of the “Song of the year” song competition in January 2004. “Song of the year” is one of the most popular song tops in Latvia, produced by “Latvia’s Radio 2” station. Z-Scars took prize “The best rock song” and “The best video” in “LNT Music video competition” by popular vote and with the right to produce a video - March 2003.

== Discography ==
- 2003 December - Starp tevi un mani (Between you and me)
- 2005 June - Pasakas un reklāmas (Tales and advertisements)
- 2008 May - Tieši sirdī (Directly in the heart)

== Band members ==
- Andris Kivics (voice, acoustic guitar)
- Reinis Brigis (drums)
