= Mārtiņš Freimanis =

Latvian musician and actor (1977–2011)

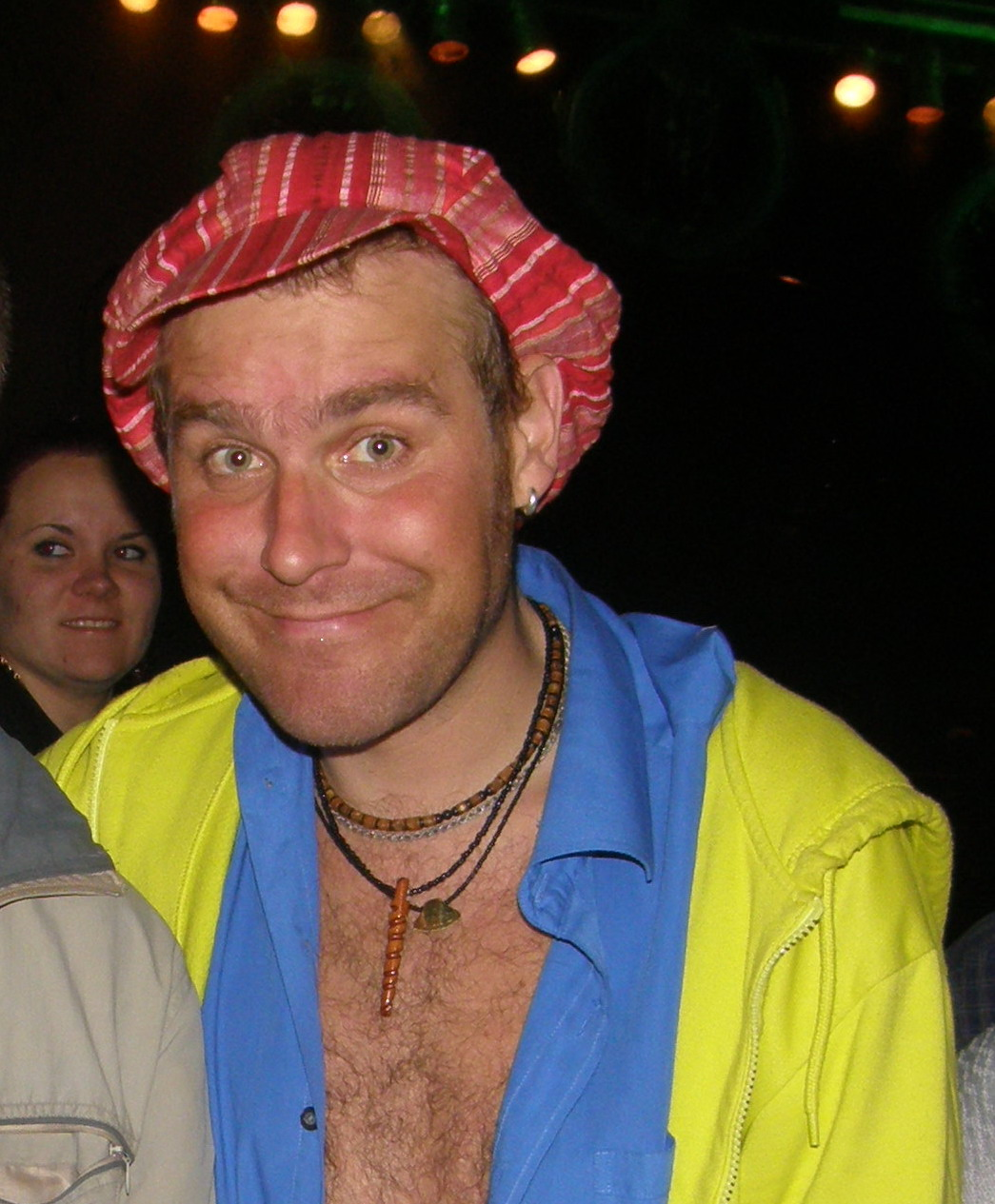
- Mārtiņš Freimanis in 2009

Background information
- Born: 7 February 1977; Liepāja, Latvia
- Origin: Liepāja, Latvia
- Died: 27 January 2011 (aged 33) Riga, Latvia
- Genres: Pop Rock
- Occupations: Musician, singer, composer, actor, poet, TV personality
- Years active: 1994–2011
- Formerly of: F.L.Y.

Mārtiņš Freimanis (7 February 1977 – 27 January 2011) was a Latvian musician, singer, songwriter, actor, and TV personality.

Freimanis was born in Liepāja, but spent his childhood in Aizpute.

== Career ==
=== Music ===
Mārtiņš Freimanis was the lead singer and songwriter of the popular Latvian rock band "Tumsa". They released 6 albums under the "Microphone Records" label. He also collaborated with other Latvian musicians, writing music, lyrics or both for them. His most popular and successful co-projects were with Lauris Reiniks (lyrics), "Putnu Balle" (music, lyrics) and "Per" (music, lyrics).

=== Eurovision ===
Freimanis represented Latvia in the 2003 Eurovision Song Contest with the group F.L.Y. He also composed "The War Is Not Over" for Latvia's Valters and Kaža, for the 2005 Eurovision Song Contest.

=== Acting ===
As an actor, Mārtiņš Freimanis appeared and starred in a musical "Kaupēns Mans Mīļais", TV series "Neprāta Cena" (LTV), "UgunsGrēks" (TV3) and movies "Man patīk, ka meitene skumst" and "Dancis pa Trim" that came out on big screens after Martin's unexpected and early death.

== Death & Legacy ==
On 18 January 2011, Freimanis was taken to the Infectology Centre of Latvia in Riga, with what was first reported to be severe respiratory tract infection. He died nine days later. It was later revealed that Freimanis died of hepatotoxicity made worse by fatty liver, and a weak heartbeat, which had caused chronic kidney disease, and pleurisy. In 2024, A bench dedicated to Freimanis was built in Aizpute, with buttons installed to listen to excerpts of his music.
