= Agnes discography =

Swedish singer Agnes

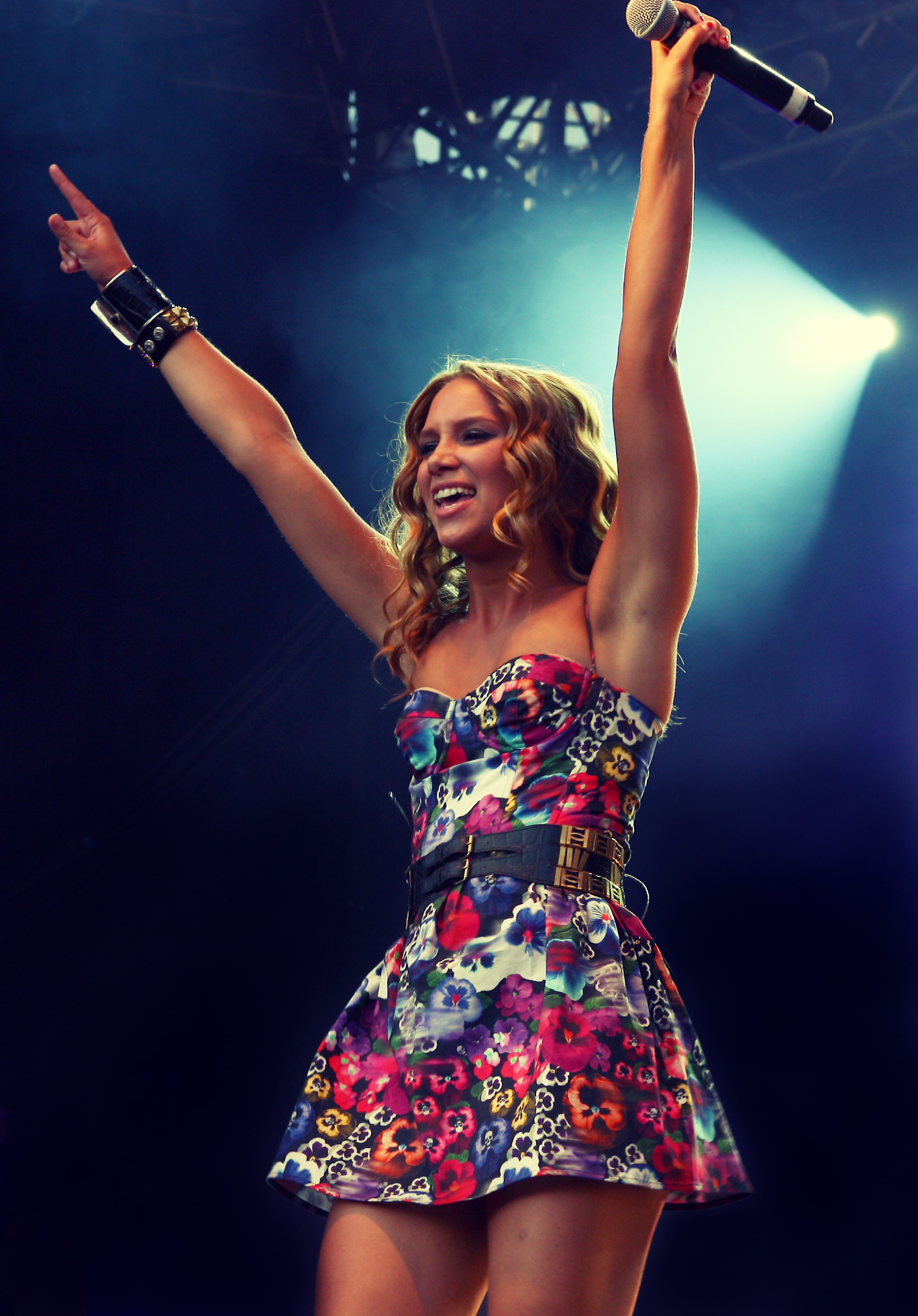
- Agnes performing at Rix Fm Festival in Kalmar, Sweden in August 2009
- Studio albums: 6
- Extended plays: 1
- Compilation albums: 1
- Singles: 30
- Music videos: 17

Swedish singer Agnes has released six studio albums, one compilation album, one extended play, 19 singles and 15 music videos.

Agnes' debut studio album, Agnes, was released in Sweden in December 2005 by Columbia Records, topping the Swedish Albums Chart and earning a platinum certification. The first single, "Right Here Right Now", also topped the charts in Sweden. The second and final single from the album, "Stranded", did not fare as well, peaking at number 27. The following year, she released her second studio album, Stronger, which also topped the Swedish chart. The two singles released followed a similar pattern as her debut—"Kick Back Relax" peaked at number two and "Champion" at number 19.

In 2009, Agnes released her third studio album, Dance Love Pop. The first single, "Release Me", peaked at number nine in Sweden and was released as Agnes' international debut. The song reached the top five in the United Kingdom, Germany and Switzerland, and the top 10 in many other countries. "On and On" was the second single in selected countries and peaked at number eight in Sweden and 16 in Denmark. "Love Love Love" and "I Need You Now" were also released in Sweden, peaking at numbers four and 10, respectively. In 2012, Agnes topped the DigiListan chart with "One Last Time".

In 2021, Agnes released her fifth studio album, Magic Still Exists. It peaked at number seven in Sweden.

== Albums ==
=== Studio albums ===
List of studio albums, with selected chart positions and certifications
Title	Details	Peak chart positions						Sales	Certifications
Title	Details	SWE	AUT	FRA	GER	SWI	UK	Sales	Certifications
Agnes	Released: 19 December 2005; Label: Columbia; Formats: CD, digital download	1	—	—	—	—	—	SWE: 90,000	GLF: Platinum
Stronger	Released: 11 October 2006; Label: Ariola; Formats: CD, digital download	1	—	—	—	—	—		
Dance Love Pop	Released: 29 October 2008; Label: Roxy; Formats: CD, digital download	5	70	38	69	45	112		
Veritas	Released: 5 September 2012; Label: Roxy; Formats: CD, digital download	3	—	—	—	—	—		
Magic Still Exists	Released: 22 October 2021; Label: Universal; Formats: LP, digital download, streaming	7	—	—	—	—	—		
Beautiful Madness	Released: 23 January 2026; Label: Polydor, Universal; Formats: LP, digital download, streaming	3	—	—	—	—	—		
"—" denotes a recording that did not chart or was not released in that territory.

=== Compilation albums ===
List of compilation albums, with selected chart positions
Title	Details	Peak chart positions
Title	Details	SWE
Collection	Released: 27 December 2013; Label: Roxy; Formats: CD, digital download	4

=== Extended plays ===
Title	Details
Nothing Can Compare	Released: 25 October 2019; Label: Senga; Formats: Digital download

== Singles ==
=== As lead artist ===
List of singles, with selected chart positions and certifications, showing year released and album name
Title	Year	Peak chart positions										Certifications	Album
Title	Year	SWE	AUT	BEL (FL)	DEN	FRA	GER	IRE	NL	SWI	UK	Certifications	Album
"Right Here, Right Now (My Heart Belongs to You)"	2005	1	—	—	—	—	—	—	—	—	—	IFPI SWE: Platinum	Agnes
"Stranded"	2006	27	—	—	—	—	—	—	—	—	—		Agnes
"Kick Back Relax"	2006	2	—	—	—	—	—	—	—	—	—		Stronger
"Champion"	2006	19	—	—	—	—	—	—	—	—	—		Stronger
"All I Want for Christmas Is You" (with Måns Zelmerlöw)	2007	3	—	—	—	—	—	—	—	—	—	IFPI SWE: Gold	Non-album single
"On and On"	2008	8	61	8	16	14	41	—	— (Note: "On and On" did not enter the Dutch Top 40, but peaked at number four on the Dutch Tipparade chart.)	37	82	IFPI SWE: Gold	Dance Love Pop
"Release Me"	2008	9	8	7	6	7	5	10	13	5	3	BPI: Platinum; BVMI: Gold; IFPI DEN: Platinum	Dance Love Pop
"Love Love Love"	2009	4	—	—	—	—	—	—	—	—	—		Dance Love Pop
"I Need You Now"	2009	8	—	20	—	—	—	—	— (Note: "I Need You Now" did not enter the Dutch Top 40, but peaked at number 15 on the Dutch Tipparade chart.)	—	40		Dance Love Pop
"Sometimes I Forget"	2010	—	—	57	—	10	—	—	—	—	—		Dance Love Pop
"When You Tell The World You're Mine" (with Björn Skifs)	2010	1	—	—	—	—	—	—	—	—	—		Non-album single
"Don't Go Breaking My Heart"	2011	—	—	23	—	—	—	—	—	—	—		Veritas
"One Last Time"	2012	33	—	72	—	—	—	—	—	—	—	IFPI SWE: Platinum	Veritas
"All I Want Is You"	2012	—	—	—	—	—	—	—	—	—	—		Veritas
"Got Me Good"	2013	—	—	—	—	—	—	—	—	—	—		Veritas
"Limelight"	2019	—	—	—	—	—	—	—	—	—	—		Nothing Can Compare
"I Trance"	2019	—	—	—	—	—	—	—	—	—	—		Nothing Can Compare
"Nothing Can Compare"	2019	—	—	—	—	—	—	—	—	—	—		Nothing Can Compare
"Goodlife"	2020	— (Note: "Goodlife" did not enter the Swedish Singellista Chart, but peaked at number five on the Swedish Heatseeker Chart.)	—	—	—	—	—	—	—	—	—		Non-album single
"Fingers Crossed"	2020	38	—	—	—	—	—	—	—	—	—		Magic Still Exists
"24 Hours"	2021	— (Note: "24 Hours" did not enter the Swedish Singellista Chart, but peaked at number 12 on the Swedish Heatseeker Chart.)	—	—	—	—	—	—	—	—	—		Magic Still Exists
"Here Comes the Night"	2021	84	—	—	—	—	—	—	—	—	—		Magic Still Exists
"Balenciaga Covered Eyes"	2025	— (Note: "Balenciaga Covered Eyes" did not enter the Swedish Singellista Chart, but peaked at number 15 on the Swedish Heatseeker Chart.)	—	—	—	—	—	—	—	—	—		Beautiful Madness
"Milk"	2025	—	—	—	—	—	—	—	—	—	—		Beautiful Madness
"Ego"	2025	—	—	—	—	—	—	—	—	—	—		Beautiful Madness
"Wake Up"	2026	—	—	—	—	—	—	—	—	—	—		Beautiful Madness
"Lovesongs"	2026	— (Note: "Lovesongs" did not enter the Swedish Singellista Chart, but peaked at number 6 on the Swedish Heatseeker Chart.)	—	—	—	—	—	—	—	—	—		Beautiful Madness
"—" denotes a recording that did not chart or was not released in that territory.

=== As featured artist ===
List of singles, with selected chart positions and certifications, showing year released and album name
Title	Year	Peak chart positions						Album
Title	Year	SWE	GER	IRE	NL	SWI	UK	Album
"Life (Diamonds in the Dark)" (John Dahlbäck featuring Agnes)	2013	—	—	—	—	—	—	Non-album singles
"More Than You Know" (Acoustic) (Vargas and Lagola featuring Agnes)	2017	—	—	—	—	—	—	Non-album singles
"Tough Love" (Avicii featuring Agnes and Vargas and Lagola)	2019	2	72	35	69	31	60	Tim
"Twisted Mind" (Purple Disco Machine featuring Agnes)	2022	—	—	—	—	—	—	Exotica
"—" denotes a recording that did not chart or was not released.

== Other charted songs ==
List of other charted songs, with selected chart positions, showing year released and album name
Title	Year	Peak chart positions		Album
Title	Year	SWE	SWE (DL)	Album
"En sån Karl"	2013	10	4	Collection
"Allt ljus på mig"	2013	49	7	Collection
"Nu måste vi dra"	2013	45	10	Collection
"Flowers"	2013	—	12	Collection
"Hanna från Arlöv"	2013	—	14	Collection
"Instant Repeater"	2013	46	3	Collection
"Love and Appreciation"	2021	— (Note: "Love and Appreciation" did not enter the Swedish Singellista Chart, but peaked at number 11 on the Swedish Heatseeker Chart.)	—	Magic Still Exists
"—" denotes a recording that did not chart or was not released in that territory.

== Music videos ==
List of music videos, showing year released and directors
Title	Year	Director
"Right Here Right Now"	2005	Unknown
"Stranded"	2006	Unknown
"Kick Back Relax"	2006	Unknown
"Champion"	2006	Peter Mars
"On and On"	2008	Anders Rune
"Release Me"	2008	Anders Rune
"On and On" (international version)	2009	Torbjörn Martin
"Release Me" (US version)	2009	Thomas Kloss
"I Need You Now"	2009	Paul Boyd
"On and On" (UK version)	2010	Torbjörn Martin
"Sometimes I Forget"	2010	Torbjörn Martin
"Don't Go Breaking My Heart"	2011	Mikeadelica
"One Last Time"	2012	Amir Chamdin
"Nothing Can Compare"	2019	Marcus Lackman
"Goodlife"	2020	Unknown
"Fingers Crossed"	2020	SWIM CLUB
"24 Hours"	2021	SWIM CLUB
