= List of awards and nominations received by Agnes =

Agnes awards and nominations
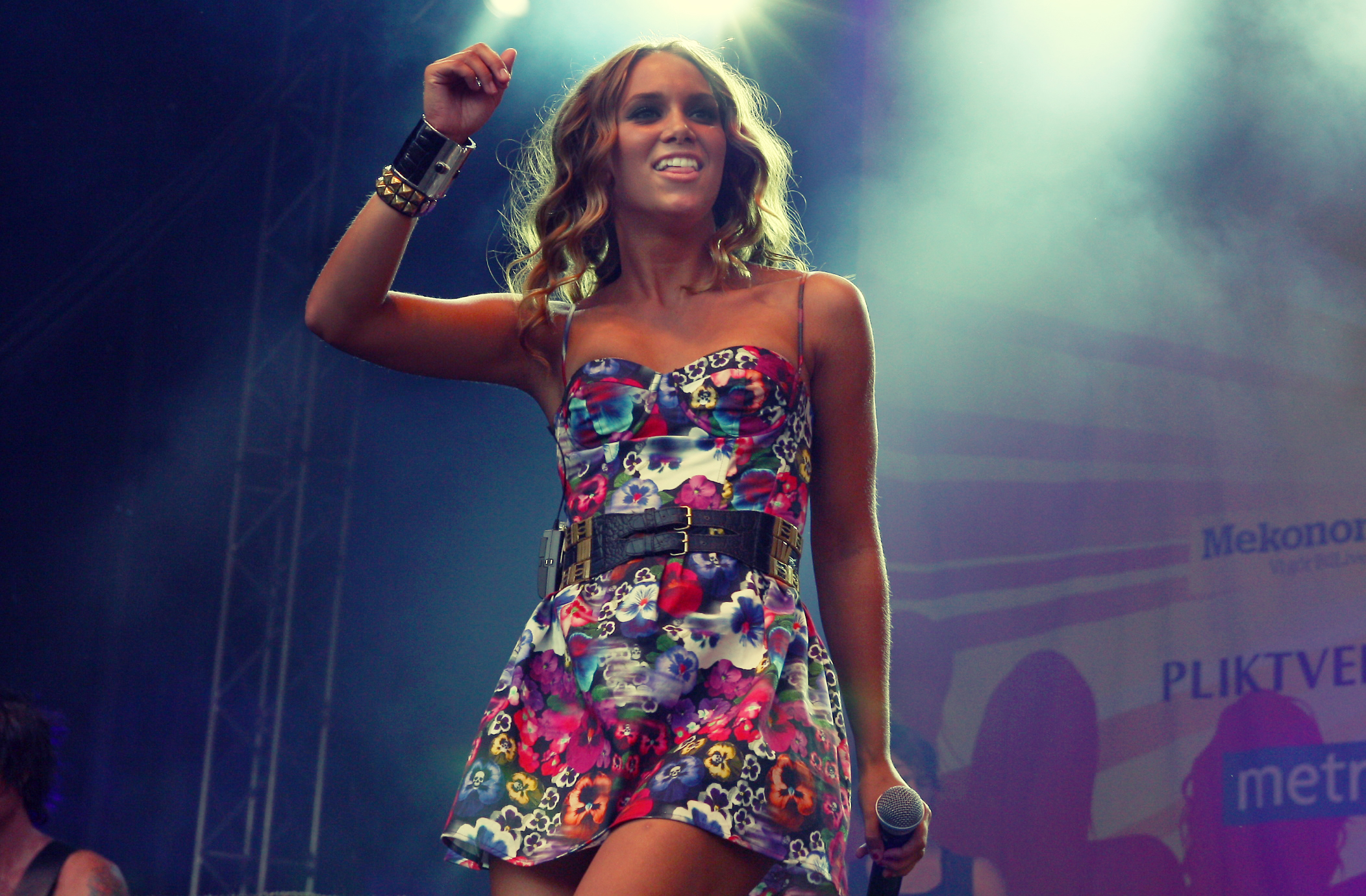
- Agnes performing at Rix Fm Festival in Sweden on August 6, 2009.
Awards and nominations
Award	Wins	Nominations
Grammis	0	4
MTV Europe Music Awards	1	2
NRJ Music Awards	0	1
NewNowNext Awards	1	0

Totals (Note: Certain award groups do not simply award one winner. They acknowledge several different recipients, have runners-up, and have third place. Since this is a specific recognition and is different from losing an award, runner-up mentions are considered wins in this award tally. For simplification and to avoid errors, each award in this list has been presumed to have had a prior nomination.)
- Wins: 7
- Nominations: 17

This is a comprehensive list of major music awards received by Agnes, a Swedish recording artist who rose to fame as the winner of Idol 2005 and have since then released two studio albums in Sweden and one worldwide. When releasing her third album, Dance Love Pop, worldwide she has gained major success and has been nominated sixteen times for different awards in, among others, Sweden, France and the U.S.

== Berlin Music Video Awards ==
The Berlin Music Video Awards is an international festival that promotes the art of music videos.

Year	Nominee/work	Award	Result	Ref.
2026	"BALENCIAGA COVERED EYES"	Best Cinematography	Nominated	

== Grammis ==
The Grammis Awards are the Swedish equivalent of the Grammy Awards. The awards ceremony is generally held each year in February in Stockholm. Agnes has received eight nominations.

Year	Nominee / work	Award	Result
2006	"Right Here, Right Now"	Song of the Year	Nominated
2009	Herself	Female singer of the Year	Nominated
2009	Herself	Singer of the Year	Nominated
2010	"Release Me"	Song of the Year	Nominated
2022	"Magic Still Exists"	Best Album	Nominated
2022	"Magic Still Exists"	Best Pop	Nominated
2022	Agnes Carlsson, Vincent Pontare, Salem Al Fakir, Kerstin Ljungström, Maria Hazell	Best Songwriter	Won
2022	"24 Hours"	Best Music Video	Nominated

== MTV Europe Music Awards ==
The MTV Europe Music Awards is an annual awards ceremony established in 1994 by MTV Networks Europe. Agnes has received one award from two nominations.

Year	Nominee / work	Award	Result
2009	Herself	Best Swedish Act	Won
2009	Herself	Best European Act	Nominated

== Swedish Nickelodeon Kids' Choice Awards ==
Agnes has received one award from one nomination.

Year	Nominee / work	Award	Result
2006	Herself	Artist of the Year	Won

== The QX Awards ==
The QX Awards is an annual Swedish awards ceremony for Gay and Lesbians. Agnes has received one award from three nominations.

Year	Nominee / work	Award	Result
2009	Herself	Artist of the Year	Nominated
2009	"On and On"	Song of the Year	Nominated
2010	Herself	Artist of the Year	Won

== The Swedish Music Publishers Association Awards ==
The Swedish Music Publishers Association Awards (Swedish: Musikförläggarnas Pris) has been held since 2003. by Agnes has received one award from one nomination.

Year	Nominee / work	Award	Result
2009	"Release Me"	Song of the Year	Won

== P3 Guld ==
The P3 Guld award is an annually award held by Sveriges Radio. Agnes has received one award from one nomination.

Year	Nominee / work	Award	Result
2009	"Release Me"	Song of the Year	Nominated

== Radio Regenbogen Awards ==
The Radio Regenbogen Awards is a German radio award show held annually. Agnes has received one award from one nomination.

Year	Nominee / work	Award	Result
2010	Herself	Newcomer of the Year	Won

== Rockbjörnen Awards ==
The Rockbjörnen Awards is a Swedish award show held annually by the tabloid Aftonbladet. Agnes has received one nomination.

Year	Nominee / work	Award	Result
2010	Herself	Female artist of the year	Nominated

== NRJ Music Awards ==
The NRJ Music Awards was created in 2000 by the radio station NRJ in partnership with the television network TF1 takes place every year in mid-January at Cannes (PACA, France) as the opening of MIDEM (Marché international de l'édition musicale). Agnes has received one nomination.

Year	Nominee / work	Award	Result
2010	Herself	International New Artist of the Year	Nominated

== NewNowNext Awards ==
The NewNowNext Awards were held in 2008 by the gay and lesbian-themed network Logo. Agnes has received one award from one nomination.

Year	Nominee / work	Award	Result
2010	Herself	Brink of Fame: Music Artist	Won
