= Torbjörn Martin =

Swedish film and music video director (born 1981)

Torbjörn Martin (born 21 October 1981) is a Swedish film and music video director. His main work revolves around commercials and music videos. He has directed a feature-length documentary about Swedish rock band Mando Diao (released on DVD with the 2009 Mando Diao album Malevolence of Mando Diao) as well as the dramatic short film No Come Down that premiered at Gothenburg International Film Festival in 2009.

== Videography ==
- Those Dancing Days for Those Dancing Days
- Conjure Me for Kristofer Åström
- The Dark for Kristofer Åström
- Cadillac for Pascal
- Baby Blue Eyes for Oholics
- Silly Really for Per Gessle
- On and On (UK & world edition) for Agnes
- Captain Cessna for Super Viral Brothers
- Sometimes I Forget for Agnes
- River en vacker dröm for Håkan Hellström
- Jag vet vilken dy hon varit i for Håkan Hellström
- 999 for Kent
- Jag ser dig for Kent
- Tänd på for Kent
- Valborg for Håkan Hellström
- Ouf for Habz

== Filmography ==
- Mando Diao – Live & unplugged at Svenska Grammofonstudion (2009)
- No Come Down (Ingen Kom Ner) (2009)
- "2 steg från Håkan" (2011)
