= Don't Go Breaking My Heart (Agnes song) =

2011 single by Agnes

Promotional single by Agnes

from the album Agnes Collection
- Released: September 21, 2011
- Recorded: 2011; Stockholm, Sweden
- Genre: Dance-pop, synthpop, disco
- Length: 3:46
- Label: Roxy/Universal Music
- Songwriters: Agnes Carlsson, Vincent Pontare, Magnus Lidehäll, Mim & Liv Nervo
- Producers: Magnes Lidehäll, Vincent Pontare

"Don't Go Breaking My Heart" is a song by Swedish recording artist Agnes, released on September 21, 2011 as a promotional single. The song was first heard and revealed as a single during the Stockholm Pride festival on August 5, 2011 The song is written by Agnes, Vincent Pontare, Magnus Lidehäll, The Nervo Twins and produced by Vincent Pontare and Magnus Lidehäll. A music video for the single release was shot on September 12, 2011 and directed by Mikeadelica.

== Background ==
Already in January 2011, Swedish tabloid Expressen declared the comeback of Agnes with a new single before the summer, this was later audited to "during the summer" and then to "the end of 2011". The numerous delays came to an end when the song "Don't go breaking my heart" first was heard when Agnes performed at the Stockholm Pride Festival, clips of the song then started to thrive on the internet and a release in "early fall" was announced. On August 24 the label announced that the song would be released on September 21, 2011 and the Scandinavian online retailer CDON.com soon after made it possible to pre-order the single. The release dates for the rest of the world will be "released soon" according to Universal Music. In October 2013, two years after the song's initial release, BIP Records and Universal Music revealed the release of the song as a single in France and Belgium.

== Production and artwork ==
The track is written by Agnes, her boyfriend Vincent Pontare, Magnus Lidehäll and The Nervo Twins. Lidehäll has also produced the song together with Vincent Pontare.

Agnes herself decided to record the song, and the rest of the album, in Sweden although her huge success with Release Me had open up many opportunities to record it in the U.S. "I thought about that, but found that the music I do - pop, disco, dance music - it's our speciality in Sweden. We have worked with that for so long. In the United States ... sometimes they find that "this sounds supercool", while you, so to speak ... think that we have already done that."

The lyrics is about fear to let anyone get close, to lower our guard when standing face to face with the great love. Agnes herself commented on her writing in a press release from Universal, "I write a lot about love and relationships. For better or worse. I love powerful music, as the music approaches the great feelings, and nothing is bigger than love. It's the greatest thing in the end."

The single's artwork was revealed in August and consists of Agnes in a black dress with the wind in her hair and the name of the single written all over it in white, written by Agnes herself. It differs from her earlier single covers, such as Release Me, the hit single from her third album Dance Love Pop. "Don't Go Breaking My Heart" shows a slightly darker side and lacks the playfulness that marked her earlier covers.

== Music video ==
Agnes in the Music video for "Don't Go Breaking My Heart".

The music video for "Don't Go Breaking My Heart" was shot on September 12, 2011 and was released just nine days later, on September 23 on Agnes official YouTube channel and on Aftonbladets website. It was directed by Micke Gustavsson, also known as "Mikeadelica". The idea behind the video is to describe how it feels to have your heart broken, the shifts between being very fragile and very strong.

=== Synopsis ===
The music video starts with a blurred close up of Agnes, showing only parts of her face in front of some trees. This continues until the song starts, and Agnes' mouth is suddenly more sharp and shapes the first words of the song. The camera then zoom out and Agnes torso is visibly up front, wearing her hair out and in a black tight top. She is then duplicated as shown in the adjacent picture and starts to dance. Another background emerges with arrows pointing out and forming a circle around her, Agnes look into the camera and sings "Don't go breaking my heart, don't go breaking my heart.." showing the fragile part of someone when being heartbroken. In the next scene, there is strings with keys tied to them and flashing light bulbs hanging over a mirror with Agnes reflection in it, while she sings "The walls caving in, I'm giving in /../ I can't stop this now, 'cause my world revolves 'round you, and there's nothing I can do". Agnes is then shown in an upfront angle with a pony-tail and the wind blowing in her hair, this scene shifts with earlier scenes during the chorus. In the end, Agnes appears in a wedding dress with an arrow pointing out of her heart when she is slowly fading away.

== Critical reception ==
Anders Nunstedt, from the Swedish tabloid Expressen, compares "Don't Go Breaking My Heart" with "Release Me" and says that it has the same sort of energy and "sounds like a hit already at the first listening, but haven't we heard this before?". He continues with praising her vocals and says that the chorus is "so clear that one can detect it from miles away and the song's disco strings efficiently pumps up the verses. It is stable. While it is difficult to avoid the feeling that Agnes's sound has evolved zero percent since last time."

== Chart performance ==
After its release in Sweden, the single spend almost two weeks on the iTunes top ten download chart. So on October 2, 2011 "Don't go breaking my heart" entered the official Swedish download chart at three. Despite this it failed to enter the official Swedish single chart, Sverigetopplistan, making it the first Agnes single ever to completely miss the Top 60 chart. The reason for this is that since October 29, 2010 the singles chart includes data from online streaming services such as Spotify, since the Spotify consumption in Sweden outlines the digital sales it is necessary for a single to break into the Spotify Top 60 chart to even enter the official single chart.

== Track listings ==
Digital Download/Streaming

(Released: September 21, 2011) (Roxy/Universal)

1. "Don't Go Breaking My Heart " [Radio Edit] — 3:46

CD-single

(Released: September 21, 2011) (Roxy/Universal)

1. "Don't Go Breaking My Heart " [Radio Edit] — 3:46

Streaming

(Released: October 20, 2011) (Roxy/Universal)

1. "Don't Go Breaking My Heart " [Niclas Kings Radio Remix] — 3:38
2. "Don't Go Breaking My Heart " [Niclas Kings Radio Remix Extended] — 5:58

Digital Download/Streaming

(Released: December 3, 2011) (Roxy/Universal)

1. "Don't Go Breaking My Heart " [Fredda.L & Daif Dirty Remix] — 4:35
2. "Don't Go Breaking My Heart " [Fredda.L & Daif Remix] — 6:06
3. "Don't Go Breaking My Heart " [Fredda.L & Daif Radio Edit] — 3:11
4. "Don't Go Breaking My Heart " [Daif Radio Edit] — 3:28

== Charts and certifications ==
=== Weekly charts ===
| Chart (2011) | Peak position |
|---|---|
| Swedish Singles Chart (Downloads) | 3 |
| Svensktoppen (Airplay) | 4 |
| Slovakia Airplay (ČNS IFPI) | 49 |

== Release history ==
| Region | Date | Format | Label |
|---|---|---|---|
| Sweden | September 21, 2011 | CD single/Digital download | Roxy Recordings |
| Denmark | September 26, 2011 | Copenhagen Records | Roxy Recordings |
| Norway | October 12, 2011 | Digital download | Universal Music |
| Belgium | October 21, 2013 | Digital download | BIP Records/Universal |
| France | October 28, 2013 | Digital download | BIP Records/Universal |
