= I Need You Now (Agnes song) =

Single by Agnes

from the album Dance Love Pop
- Released: 9 October 2009
- Recorded: 2009
- Genre: Pop (original version); Dance-pop (single version)
- Length: 3:46
- Label: Roxy
- Songwriter(s): Anders Hansson, Sharon Vaughn
- Producer(s): Anders Hansson

Agnes singles chronology
"Love Love Love" (2009)	"I Need You Now" (2009)	"When You Tell the World You're Mine" (2010)

Agnes international singles chronology
"On and On" (2009)	"I Need You Now" (2009)

Agnes UK singles chronology
"Release Me" (2009)	"I Need You Now" (2009)	"On and On" (2010)

Alternative cover
- Italian cover

"I Need You Now" is a pop song recorded by the Swedish singer Agnes for her third album Dance Love Pop. The song was written by Anders Hansson and Sharon Vaughn. It was released as the album's second single in the UK in a remixed form. The song was re-sung and completely reproduced during summer 2009 for the single release. It was also released as the third single in the Netherlands on October 9.

The song's first radio play was on Friday 11 September on BBC Radio 1's Floorfillers with Scott Mills.

== Background ==
"I Need You Now" is a slow song, track number 5 on the album. "On and On" was originally set to be the second single in the UK, but in September a re-recorded version of "I Need You Now" was announced instead. The song was released in Sweden as the fourth single, in the Netherlands and Poland as the third single and in Australia as the second. In Sweden, the song's first play was on Sweden's biggest commercial radio station on November 6; the single was released as digital download only. In Australia, the Cahill Radio Remix was used for the single release.

Talking about the song, Agnes told The Sun, "It's simple and direct, you can relate to it and I love the lyrics. The first time I heard it, I thought this is me. This is my life."

The DJ Cahill Remix of the song has a piano riff similar to that which is in Coldplay's song, "Clocks".

== Chart performance ==
"I Need You Now" was released in the Netherlands on October 9, 2009, but failed to enter any charts. In November it was released in Sweden and entered the Swedish Singles Chart at 10, and two weeks later peaked at eight. Agnes' seventh top-ten hit in Sweden, it was in the chart for thirteen weeks. Released in the United Kingdom on November 13, it entered the UK Singles Chart one week later at number 40. It then dropped the week after to number 67 and thereafter left the chart. Though the single did not manage as well in the UK it peaked high in other European countries, in Estonia at four and in Slovenia at two. It has also charted in Slovakia, Cyprus, Poland and Malta.

== Music video ==
Agnes in front of an Aptera electric vehicle.

The music video was shot in the Mojave Desert at the El Mirage dry lake bed outside Los Angeles on October 4, 2009. It was directed by Paul Boyd and released on AATW's official YouTube channel on October 16, 2009. Though "I Need You Now" did not meet the expectations in the UK, the music video was heavily rotated in Sweden, among other places, where it stayed on MTV's "most played chart" for numerous weeks.

The music video begins with Agnes walking around in the desert next to the futuristic Aptera electric vehicle searching for something. She later enters the Aptera and drives it, then she steps out wearing a white space suit. The video then shows a Native American (Rick Mora) riding on a horse, probably looking for Agnes. In the end, they meet up and walk away together. The video shows Agnes in three different dresses.

== Track listings ==
CD-single/Digital Download (Dutch release)

(Released: October 16, 2009) (White Villa)

1. "I Need You Now" [UK Radio Edit] — 3:07
2. "I Need You Now" [Extended Mix] — 4:34
3. "I Need You Now" [UK Album Edit] — 3:00
4. "I Need You Now" [Cahill Club Mix] — 6:20
5. "I Need You Now" [Music Video] — 3:00

Digital Download (UK release)

(Released: November 15, 2009) (AATW)

1. "I Need You Now" [UK Radio Edit) — 3:07
2. "I Need You Now" [Extended Mix] — 4:35
3. "I Need You Now" [Cahill Radio Edit] — 3:13
4. "I Need You Now" [Cahill Club Mix] — 6.20
5. "I Need You Now" [Grant Nelson Mix] — 7:30
6. "I Need You Now" [Ali Payami Mix] — 5:54
7. "I Need You Now" [UK Edit] — 3:00

CD-single (UK release)

(Released: November 16, 2009) (AATW)

1. "I Need You Now" [UK Radio Edit] — 3:07
2. "I Need You Now" [Cahill Radio Edit] — 3:13

12" Maxi-single (UK release)

(Released: November 26, 2009) (AATW)

1. "I Need You Now" [Grant Nelson Mix] — 8:00
2. "I Need You Now" [Grant Nelson Dub Mix] — 7:30
3. "I Need You Now" [Cahill Mix] — 6:00
4. "I Need You Now" [Ali Payami Mix] — 6:00

Digital Download (Scandinavian release)

(Released: November 23, 2009) (Roxy)

1. "I Need You Now" [Radio Edit] — 3:45

Digital Download (Australian release)

(Released: December 25, 2009) (Warner)

1. "I Need You Now" [Cahill Radio Edit] — 3:15

Digital Download - The Remixes (Australian release)

(Released: February 12, 2010) (Warner)

1. "I Need You Now" [Cahill Extended Mix] — 6.20
2. "I Need You Now" [Ali Payami Mix] — 5:54
3. "I Need You Now" [Ali Payami 909 Mix] —
4. "I Need You Now" [Alex K Mix] —
5. "I Need You Now" [Grant Nelson Mix] — 8:00
6. "I Need You Now" (Jens Kindervater Mix) — 5:19
7. "I Need You Now" [Album Version] — 3:07
8. "I Need You Now" [Extended Mix] — 4:35

CD-single (Italian release)

(Released: 2010) (Planet)

1. "I Need You Now" [UK Radio Edit] — 3:07
2. "I Need You Now" [Extended Mix] — 4:35
3. "I Need You Now" [Grant Nelson Mix] — 8:00
4. "I Need You Now" [Cahill Club Mix] — 6.20
5. "I Need You Now" [Ali Payami Mix] — 5:54
6. "I Need You Now" [Jens Kindervater Mix] — 5:19
7. "On and On" [Radio Edit] — 3:51
8. "On and On" [Extended Version] — 5:47
9. "On and On" [Alex Colle Radio Edit Remix] —
10. "On and On" [Alex Colle Remix] —

Digital Download (Belgian release)

(Released: April 19, 2010) (BIP)

1. "I Need You Now" [Radio Edit] — 3:47
2. "I Need You Now" [Nilz Van Zandt Radio Edit] — 3:44
3. "I Need You Now" [Robert Abigail Radio Edit] — 3:34
4. "I Need You Now" [Deve, Amp & Matizz Radio Edit] — 3:35
5. "I Need You Now" [Denys Victoriano Radio Edit] — 3:52
6. "I Need You Now" [Extended Mix] — 4:35
7. "I Need You Now" [Nilz Van Zandt Extended Mix] — 4:28
8. "I Need You Now" [Robert Abigail Extended Mix] — 6:03
9. "I Need You Now" [Deve, Amp & Matizz Extended Mix] — 5:53
10. "I Need You Now" [Denys Victoriano Extended Mix] — 6:34

Digital Download - The Definitive Remixes Collection (Italian release)

(Released: May 7, 2010) (Planet)

1. "I Need You Now" [Cahill Radio Edit] — 3:15
2. "I Need You Now" [UK Mix] — 3:48
3. "I Need You Now" [Cahill Extended Mix] — 6:22
4. "I Need You Now" [Grant Nelson Mix] — 7:32
5. "I Need You Now" [Grant Nelson Radio Edit] — 2:57
6. "I Need You Now" [Grant Nelson Dub Mix] — 7:16
7. "I Need You Now" [Alex K Mix] — 6:42
8. "I Need You Now" [Ali Payami 909 Mix — 6:19
9. "I Need You Now" [Ali Payami Mix] — 5:56
10. "I Need You Now" [Jens Kindervater Mix] — 5:19
11. "I Need You Now" [Jens Kindervater Radio Edit] — 3:40
12. "I Need You Now" [Radio Edit] — 3:45

12" Vinyl (Italian release)

(Released: May 7, 2010) (Planet)
Side 1

1. "I Need You Now" [Grant Nelson Mix] — 8:00
2. "I Need You Now" [Cahill Club Mix] — 6.20

Side 2

1. "On & On" [Alex Colle Remix] —
2. "I Need You Now" [Ali Payami 909 Mix] — 6:19

== Release history ==
Region	Date	Format	Label
Netherlands	October 9, 2009	Digital Download	White Villa
Netherlands	October 16, 2009	CD single	White Villa
Sweden	November 6, 2009	Radio Single	Roxy
Sweden	November 23, 2009	Digital download	Roxy
United Kingdom	September 11, 2009	Radio single	3 Beat, AATW
United Kingdom	November 15, 2009	Digital download	3 Beat, AATW
United Kingdom	November 16, 2009	CD single	3 Beat, AATW
United Kingdom	November 26, 2009	12" Maxi	3 Beat, AATW
Denmark	December 21, 2009	Digital Download	Copenhagen
Australia	December 25, 2009	Digital Download	Warner Music
Australia	2010	CD single	Warner Music
Italy	2010	CD-single, Digital Download	Planet Records
Italy	May 7, 2010	12" Vinyl	Planet Records
Italy	May 7, 2010	Remix Collection	Planet Records
Norway	February 12, 2010	Digital Download	Bonnier Amigo/Roxy
Belgium	April 19, 2010	Digital Download	BIP Records

== Charts ==
Chart (2009)	Peak position
Belgium (Ultratop 50 Flanders)	20
Belgium (Ultratip Bubbling Under Wallonia)	2
Netherlands (Single Top 100)	15
Scotland (OCC)	39
Slovakia (Rádio Top 100)	15
Sweden (Sverigetopplistan)	8
UK Singles (OCC)	40

== Official remixes ==
- Album Version - 3:46
- Alex K Mix - 6:40
- Ali Payama Mix - 5:56
- Ali Payami 909 Mix - 6:19
- Almighty Mix - 7:31
- Cahill Club Mix - 6:22
- Cahill Radio Edit - 3:15
- Denys Victoriano Extended Mix — 6:34
- Denys Victoriano Radio Edit — 3:52
- Deve, Amp & Matizz Extended Mix — 5:53
- Deve, Amp & Matizz Radio Edit — 3:35
- Extended Version - 4:37
- Grant Nelson Dub Mix — 7:30
- Grant Nelson Mix - 7:33
- Grant Nelson Radio Edit — 2:57
- Jens Kindervater Mix — 5:19
- Jens Kindervater Radio Edit — 3:40
- Nilz Van Zandt Extended Mix — 4:28
- Nilz Van Zandt Radio Edit — 3:44
- Robert Abigail Extended Mix — 6:03
- Robert Abigail Radio Edit — 3:34
- Swedish Radio Edit - 3:45
- UK Album Edit - 3:01
- UK Radio Edit - 3:09

== Credits ==
- Vocals: Agnes
- Written by Anders Hansson, Sharon Vaughn
- Produced by Anders Hansson
- Strings by E. Arvinder and Anders Hansson
- Backing vocals: Britta Bergström and Agnes
- Produced by 3Beat Productions and AATW (UK)
