= When You Tell the World You're Mine =

Single by Agnes & Björn
- Released: 20 June 2010
- Recorded: June 2010
- Genre: Pop, Classical, Gospel
- Length: 4:05
- Label: Roxy
- Songwriters: Jörgen Elofsson, John Lundvik
- Producer: Jörgen Elofsson

Agnes singles chronology
"I Need You Now" (2010)	"When You Tell the World You're Mine" (2010)	"Sometimes I Forget" (2010)

Björn Skifs singles chronology
"Om igen" (1991)	"When You Tell the World You're Mine" (2010)

"When You Tell the World You're Mine" is a song recorded by Swedish singers Agnes Carlsson and Björn Skifs. The song was performed at the Wedding of Victoria, Crown Princess of Sweden, and Daniel Westling on 19 June 2010. It was also the official wedding song, written especially for the occasion and as a gift to the bridal couple. Before the ceremony, the title and everything concerning the song was a secret, and it was not until the actual performance that this information was revealed.

== Background ==
Agnes' and Björn's performance during the wedding

The lyrics was written by Jörgen Elofsson, who has worked with Agnes before, and the music was written by Jörgen Elofsson & John Lundvik as the official wedding song. As a tribute to Victoria, Crown Princess of Sweden, Prince Daniel, Duke of Västergötland engaged Elofsson to compose a song that express what we feel when we fall in love with someone. The single and EP is a part of the official wedding series, which is sold exclusively through ICA and iTunes.

The EP contains, except from three different versions of "When You Tell the World You're Mine", a selection of the music performed during the wedding ceremony in Storkyrkan. A part of the revenue from the single is going to the Crown Princess Couple Wedding foundation, to prevent alienation and improve good health among children in Sweden.

Right after the arch bishops speech, Agnes and Björn Skifs performed the song together with the choir of "Storkyrkan" and the orchestra. This marked the end of the ceremony, before Victoria and Daniel walked out to the porch and behind closed doors, Prince Daniel was awarded the Royal Order of the Seraphim, before leaving the cathedral.

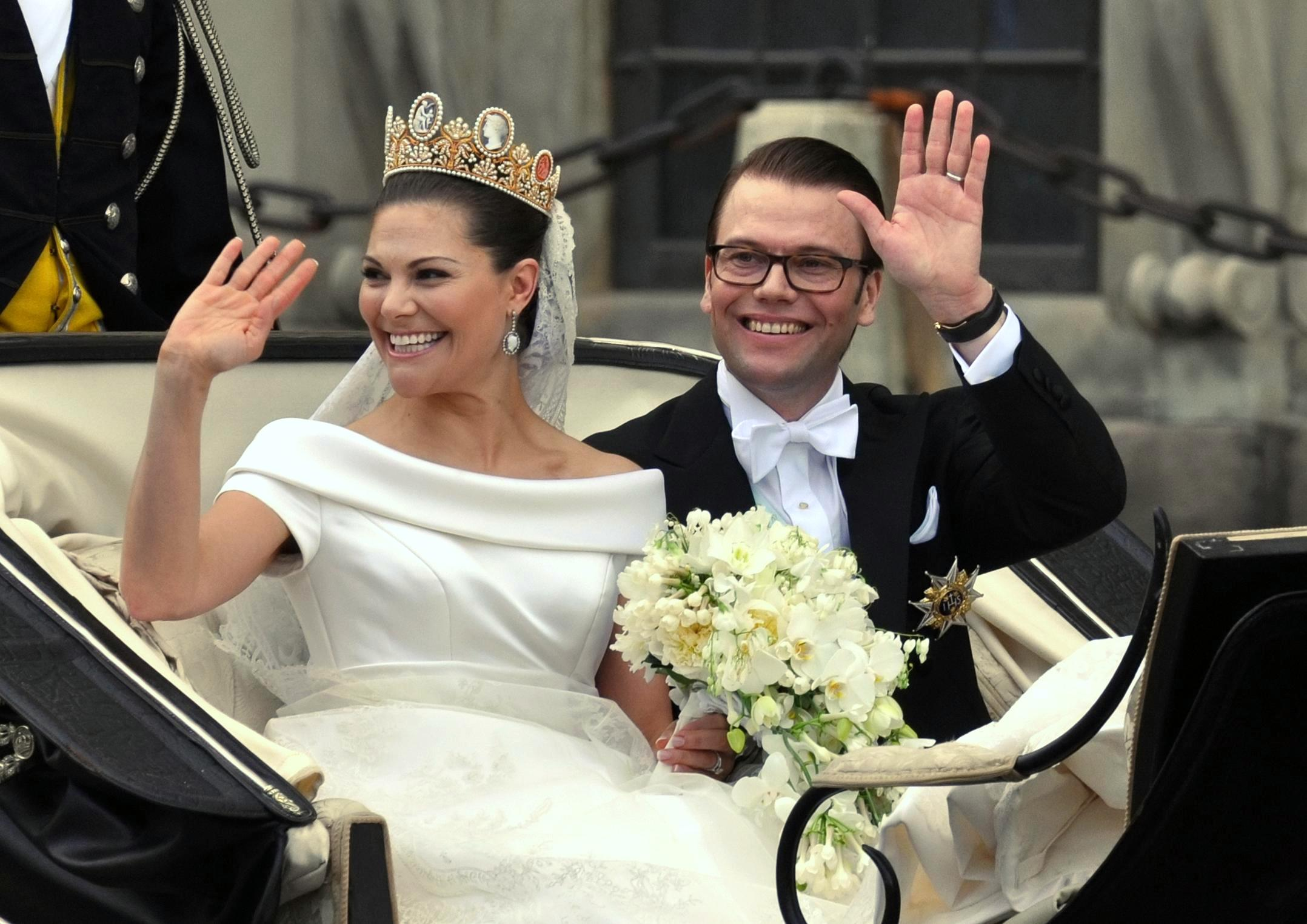
Wedding procession of the royal couple in an open carriage through Stockholm, June 19, 2010

== Critical reception ==
Johan Lindqvist of Göteborgs-Posten stated:

"Jörgen Elofsson is a professional in delivering according to the client’s wishes and this was about getting a song that is romantic but not sentimental; grand but not pompous. The whole wedding was a balancing act in which to celebrate love, but stick to rules and protocols. It became a schlager, of course. Typically Sweden year 2010… Björn Skifs sings nicely and politely and represent the mature and the Nordic calm while Agnes is allowed to be bombastic in an American way. The result is as impeccable as predictable."

The Swedish tabloid Aftonbladet had a similar opinion:

"As sweet and sentimental as Disney.... It isn't just an excellent duet, but it also has a modern touch. Almost original."

== Track listings ==
Digital Download

(Released: 20 June 2010) (Roxy Recordings)

1. "When You Tell the World You're Mine" [Radio Edit] — 4:05
2. "When You Tell the World You're Mine" [Church Version] — 4:08^{[A]}

EP

(Released: 21 June 2010) (Roxy Recordings)

1. "When You Tell the World You're Mine" [Radio Edit] — 4:05
2. "Medley"
3. "Fanfare for Victoria, crown princess of Sweden"
4. "Hymn för sopran, kör och orkester"
5. "En vänlig grönskas rika dräkt (Psalm 201:1–3)"
6. "Vi lyfter våra hjärtan (Psalm 84:1–2)"
7. "When You Tell the World You're Mine" [Church Version] — 4:08
8. "Praise the Lord with Drums and Cymbals" by The royal philharmonic orchestra
9. "When You Tell the World You're Mine" [Instrumental] — 4:05

CD Single

(Released: 23 June 2010) (Roxy Recordings)

1. "When You Tell the World You're Mine" [Radio Edit] — 4:05
2. "When You Tell the World You're Mine" [Instrumental] — 4:05

Notes

- A"Church Version" was only released in Sweden on 23 June 2010

== Release history ==
Region	Date	Format	Label
Sweden	20 June 2010	Digital download	Roxy Recordings
Sweden	21 June 2010	EP	Roxy Recordings
Sweden	23 June 2010	CD Single	Roxy Recordings
Worldwide	20 June 2010	Digital download	Roxy Recordings
Germany	25 August 2010	CD single	Warner Music

== Chart performance ==
The song was released on iTunes exclusively all over Europe on June 20, the day after the wedding. It immediately entered download charts in many territories, in Sweden it entered at one and stayed there for (to date) ten days non stop. It did also enter charts in Finland (#4) Belgium (#150), Netherlands (#124), Denmark (#29), Norway (#28), Austria (#23), Luxembourg (#22), Switzerland (#29), and Germany (#15). It was Agnes' first Number 1 hit single after 5 years and also her second one altogether.

=== Weekly charts ===
Chart (2010)	Peak position
European Hot 100 Singles (Billboard)	85
Finland (Suomen virallinen lista)	19
Sweden (Sverigetopplistan)	1
Sweden (Digital)	1
Sweden (Svensktoppen)	1

=== Year-end charts ===
Chart (2010)	Position
Sweden (Sverigetopplistan)	55
