= Love Love Love (Agnes song) =

Single by Agnes

from the album Dance Love Pop: The Love Love Love Edition
- Released: 28 February 2009
- Recorded: 2008
- Genre: Disco, dance-pop
- Length: 2:59
- Label: Roxy
- Songwriter(s): Anders Hansson
- Producer(s): Anders Hansson

Agnes singles chronology
"Release Me" (2008)	"Love Love Love" (2009)	"I Need You Now" (2009)

"Love Love Love" is a song by Swedish singer Agnes and was her entrant in Sweden's Eurovision Song Contest selection process Melodifestivalen. After proceeding to the final from the fourth semi-final, the song placed eighth out of the eleven entries. "Love Love Love" is written by Anders Hansson and was released as a one track CD single by Roxy Recordings, in addition to being included on the "Love Love Love Edition" of Agnes' 2008 album Dance Love Pop and serving as the album's third single.

== Background and Melodifestivalen ==
Agnes began her musical career in 2005 when she won Idol 2005, a Swedish singing competition based on the British show Pop Idol. She subsequently released three studio albums and attempted to take part in Melodifestivalen 2007, the Swedish selection process for the Eurovision Song Contest. Details of her participation were leaked, a violation of contest rules, and she was disqualified.

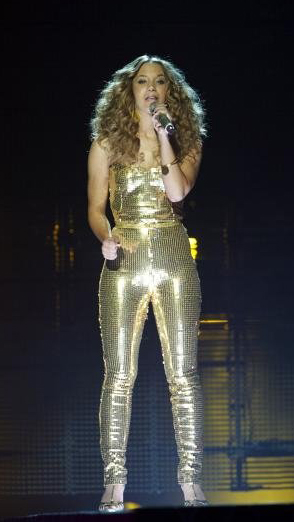
Agnes performing "Love Love Love" at Melodifestivalen 2009.

On 14 October 2008, two years after her first attempt, it was announced that Agnes was to take part in Melodifestivalen 2009 with the disco-pop song "Love Love Love". The song is written by Anders Hansson, who also wrote Agnes' third studio album Dance Love Pop from which the song is a bonus track on the re-release. At first, it was said that the song was to be performed as a duet with fellow Swedish pop singer Marie Serneholt, but it did not materialize, as Serneholt decided to compete in the contest on her own.

Agnes appeared at the fourth semi-final of the contest, held on 28 February 2009 at the Malmö Arena and competed against seven other entrants. Agnes presented "Love Love Love" first on the night, and for her performance, she appeared on stage in an "eye-catching" gold sequined skin-tight outfit and was alone at first in front of a skyscraper backdrop before being joined by six dancers. The song made the top four and was selected to duel against the Star Pilots' "Higher", with one song going to the final and the other to the "Second Chance" round. "Love Love Love" received 66,740 televotes versus the Star Pilots' 54,785, winning the duel and gaining a spot in the final.

At the Melodifestivalen final, held on March 14 at the Ericsson Globe in Stockholm, "Love Love Love" was presented third out of the eleven participants and Agnes executed a repeat performance of her show at the semi-final. When the results were announced, she received forty points in total, all from the regional juries, placing her eighth.

== Release ==
"Love Love Love" was first heard in the form of a one-minute clip on 27 February 2009, the day before Agnes appeared in the fourth semi-final of Melodifestivalen 2009; it was available on the website of Sveriges Television, the organizer of Melodifestivalen. The song was released to radio stations the following day on February 28 after the semi-final, in line with the Contest's rules. It then became available as a two–track CD single on 2 March 2009 and a one–track digital download on 1 March 2009 along with many of the other songs in the Contest. The song serves as the third single from Dance Love Pop and is included on the "Love Love Love Edition" re-release which was released on 1 April 2009.

== Track listing ==
Digital download

(Released: 1 March 2009) (Roxy Recordings)

1. "Love Love Love" [Radio Edit] — 2:59

CD single

(Released: 2 March 2009) (Roxy Recordings)

1. "Love Love Love" [Radio Edit] — 2:59
2. "Love Love Love" [Instrumental] — 2:59

== Chart performance ==
The song debuted on the Swedish Singles Chart on the week of 6 March 2009 at number 28, and peaked the following week at number four, before falling to number 11, 16, 18, 26, and then 34 in the succeeding weeks. "Love Love Love" continued its descent in the charts in its eighth and ninth weeks, charting at 37 and 55 respectively, before leaving after nine consecutive weeks.

=== Weekly charts ===
Chart (2009)	Peak position
Sweden (Sverigetopplistan)	4

=== Year-end charts ===
Chart (2009)	Position
Sweden (Sverigetopplistan)	72

== Release history ==
Region	Date	Format
Sweden	28 February 2009	Radio single
Sweden	1 March 2009	Digital download
Sweden	2 March 2009	CD single
