= Goodlife (song) =

2020 single by Agnes

Single by Agnes
- Released: 7 February 2020
- Length: 3:50
- Label: Senga
- Songwriters: Agnes Carlsson; Cathy Dennis; Salem Al Fakir; Vincent Pontare
- Producer: Vargas & Lagola

Agnes singles chronology
"Nothing Can Compare" (2019)	"Goodlife" (2020)	"Fingers Crossed" (2020)

"Goodlife" is a song by Swedish singer Agnes. It was released on 7 February 2020 through Senga. The song did not enter the Swedish Singles Chart, but peaked to number five on the Sweden Heatseeker Songs. The song was written by Agnes Carlsson, Cathy Dennis, Salem Al Fakir, Vincent Pontare and produced by Vargas & Lagola.

== Background ==
Talking about the song, Agnes said, "The track isn't about money, wealth or material things, it's about those brief moments of pure happiness. It's more on a spiritual level and the feeling of having someone on your side and you truly being there for someone. You know how fragile everything can be and that's why you appreciate those moments even more."

== Music video ==
A music video to accompany the release of "Goodlife" was first released onto YouTube on 10 March 2020.

== Charts ==
Chart (2020)	Peak position
Sweden Heatseeker (Sverigetopplistan)	5

== Release history ==
Region	Date	Format	Label
Sweden	7 February 2020	Digital download; streaming	Senga
