= Beautiful Madness (album) =

Studio album by Agnes
- Released: 23 January 2026
- Length: 31:18
- Label: Polydor; Universal
- Producer: Salem Al Fakir; Frans Bryngel; Magnus Lidehäll; Kerstin Ljungström; Vincent Pontare

Agnes chronology
| Magic Still Exists (2021) | Beautiful Madness (2026) |

Singles from Beautiful Madness
- 1. "Balenciaga Covered Eyes" Released: 23 May 2025; 2. "Milk" Released: 4 July 2025; 3. "Ego" Released: 5 September 2025; 4. "Wake Up" Released: 1 January 2026; 5. "Lovesongs" Released: 23 January 2026

Beautiful Madness is the sixth studio album by Swedish singer Agnes, released on 23 January 2026 through Polydor and Universal Music Sweden. It reached number three in her home country of Sweden.

== Background ==
Agnes kept her new signature style for subsequent releases anticipating her sixth album in studio. These subsequent releases include electro-funk midtempo "Twisted Mind" (2023), co-produced with Purple Disco Machine and later included in his album Exotica; the ethereal runway anthem "Balenciaga Covered Eyes" (2024), co-written with Hannah Wilson; and the pounding waacking earworm "Milk" (2025), inspired by Daft Punk and co-written with Danny Yxilon. A trailer for the album was released on 18 May 2025, suggesting its title to be Beautiful Madness.

Agnes mentioned visual artist Mark Rothko for the inspiration behind the creative process of her sixth studio album. "To me art is an adventure into an unknown world, which can be explored only by those willing to take the risk. Use less elements and give these every element more space. This is what I'm looking for the sounds of my upcoming project."

== Track listing ==
Beautiful Madness track listing
| No. | Title | Writer(s) | Producer(s) | Length |
|---|---|---|---|---|
| 1. | "BM-247 01 Interlude" | Agnes Carlsson; Salem Al Fakir; Magnus Lidehäll; Vincent Pontare; Hannah Wilson | Al Fakir; Lidehäll; Pontare; Frans Bryngel | 0:38 |
| 2. | "Beautiful Madness" | Carlsson; Al Fakir; Lidehäll; Pontare; Wilson | Al Fakir; Lidehäll; Pontare; Wilson; Bryngel | 1:50 |
| 3. | "Trigger" | Carlsson; Al Fakir; Kerstin Ljungström; Pontare; Wilson | Al Fakir; Pontare; Bryngel; Ljungström | 2:58 |
| 4. | "Got Any" | Carlsson; Pontare | Pontare | 0:09 |
| 5. | "Milk" | Carlsson; Alex Aris; Frans Bryngel; Ljungström; Pontare; Wilson | Pontare; Bryngel; Ljungström | 3:32 |
| 6. | "Focus" | Carlsson; Wilson | Pontare | 0:36 |
| 7. | "Wake Up" | Carlsson; Al Fakir; Ljungström; Pontare; Wilson | Al Fakir; Pontare; Bryngel | 3:04 |
| 8. | "Balenciaga Covered Eyes" | Carlsson; Bryngel; Ljungström; Pontare; Wilson | Pontare; Bryngel; Ljungström | 4:06 |
| 9. | "Not Capable" | Carlsson; Wilson | Al Fakir; Pontare | 0:28 |
| 10. | "Ego" | Carlsson; Al Fakir; Bryngel; Ljungström; Pontare; Wilson | Al Fakir; Pontare; Bryngel | 3:35 |
| 11. | "Masterpiece" | Carlsson; Pontare | Pontare | 0:10 |
| 12. | "Sign It" | Carlsson; Al Fakir; Pontare; Wilson | Al Fakir; Bryngel; Pontare | 3:09 |
| 13. | "Pre" | Carlsson; Al Fakir; Lidehäll; Pontare; Wilson | Al Fakir; Pontare; Lidehäll; Bryngel | 0:17 |
| 14. | "Lovesongs" | Carlsson; Al Fakir; Lidehäll; Pontare; Wilson | Al Fakir; Pontare; Lidehäll; Bryngel | 3:33 |
| 15. | "Uterus & Universe" | Carlsson; Ljungström; Wilson | Ljungström | 3:07 |
| Total length: | | | | 31:18 |

== Personnel ==
Credits adapted from Tidal.

- Agnes – vocals
- Vincent Pontare – programming (tracks 1–14), mixing (4, 6, 9, 11)
- Frans Bryngel – programming (1–3, 5, 7, 8, 10, 12–14)
- Salem Al Fakir – programming (1–3, 7, 9, 10, 12–14)
- Magnus Lidehäll – programming (1, 2, 13, 14)
- Kerstin Ljungström – programming (3, 5, 8, 15), additional programming (12)
- Wille Enblad – additional programing (3, 7, 10)
- Geoff Swan – mixing (1–3, 5–8, 10, 12–15)
- Chris Gehringer – mastering

== Charts ==
Chart performance for Beautiful Madness
| Chart (2026) | Peak position |
|---|---|
| Swedish Albums (Sverigetopplistan) | 3 |
| UK Album Downloads (OCC) | 26 |

== Release history ==
| Country | Date | Format | Label |
|---|---|---|---|
| Various | 23 January 2026 | Digital Download, streaming | Polydor; Universal |
