= Sometimes I Forget =

Single by Agnes

from the album Dance Love Pop
- Released: March 15, 2010
- Recorded: 2008 and 2010
- Genre: Pop
- Length: 3:42
- Label: Roxy
- Songwriter(s): Anders Hansson, S.Diamond, Agnes Carlsson
- Producer(s): Anders Hansson, Felix Persson, Märta Grauers

Agnes singles chronology
"When You Tell the World You're Mine" (2010)	"Sometimes I Forget" (2010)	"One Last Time" (2012)

"Sometimes I Forget" is a pop song recorded by Swedish singer Agnes taken from her third album Dance Love Pop. The track was written by Anders Hansson, Steve Diamond and Agnes. It was released as the album's third single in France, and the fourth single in Italy and Belgium.

== Background and release ==
The track was first heard on Agnes' third album Dance Love Pop, released in 2008 in Sweden. When "I Need You Now" was chosen as the third single across Europe, Agnes French label Sony Music decided a different path for her and released "Sometimes I Forget" as the follow-up to her previous singles "Release Me" and "On and On". Like the previous singles, a French version was recorded in January 2010 for the single release, and together with a couple of new remixes a Promo CD was released to radio and television in mid-February.

To date, Agnes has sold over 160,000 singles in France.

"Sometimes I Forget" was featured on the compilation album "M6 Hits 2010" which was released as digital download on March 15, 2010 the very same day that the music video premiered. Though it has yet not been released as a proper single.

== Music video ==
Agnes in front of her make-up table, wearing a 1940s peach silk robe and Swarowski crystals.

The music video for "Sometimes I Forget" was filmed in Gothenburg, Sweden on March 3, 2010 and is part English, part French. Just like Agnes' earlier videos for "On and On", the international and the UK edit, it was directed by Torbjörn Martin and the production agency is STARK production.

The video starts off with Agnes sitting in front of a make-up table in her dressing room, wearing a 1940s peach silk robe and Swarowski crystals. This scene shifts with intermediate sequences of Agnes in the backseat of a car, on her way to her concert and of her lying in bed singing. The video then shows her in a silver haute couture dress backstage, walking through the corridors to the stage. She then enters the stage, where she is met by flashlights and an audience applauding frenetically. She steps up to an old 1940s microphone and starts to sing the chorus. In the end, the light turns off and the hall seems empty and Agnes walks out to the sound of her shoes echoing through the room. The video premiered on March 15, 2010, on M6's official YouTube channel.

An English edition was posted on Agnes' official website on June 2, 2010, made for the single release outside France.

== Release history ==
Region	Date	Format	Label
France	February 17, 2010	Airplay	Sony Music
France	March 15, 2010	Digital Download	Sony Music
Italy	May 7, 2010	Digital Download	Planet Records
Belgium	November 16, 2010	Digital Download	BIP

== Track listing ==
Digital Download (Italian release)

(Released: May 7, 2010) (Label:Planet)

1. "Sometimes I Forget" [Radio Edit] — 3:36
2. "Sometimes I Forget" [The Gorque Remix] — 3:53
3. "Sometimes I Forget" [Album Version] — 4:13

Digital Download (Belgium release)

(Released: November 16, 2010) (Label:BIP)

1. "Sometimes I Forget" [Radio Edit] — 3:44
2. "Sometimes I Forget" [French Radio Edit] — 3:45
3. "Sometimes I Forget" [Club Mix] — 3:20
4. "Sometimes I Forget" [The Gorque Remix] — 3:51

== Charts and Sales ==
=== Charts ===
Chart (2010)	Peak position
Belgium (Ultratip Bubbling Under Wallonia)	42
Belgium (Ultratip Bubbling Under Flanders)	7
France (TV Airplay Chart)	10

== Official remixes ==
- Album version - 4:13
- Radio Edit 3:36
- French Radio Edit 3:36
- 2FrenchGuys Mix - 3:20
- The Gorque Remix - 3:53
