= On and On (Agnes song) =

2008 song by Agnes

Single by Agnes

from the album Dance Love Pop
- Released: August 11, 2008
- Recorded: 2008
- Genre: Dance-pop; Europop; Synthpop
- Length: 3:53 (Original Radio Edit); 3:08 (UK Radio Edit)
- Label: Roxy
- Songwriters: Anders Hansson, Steven Diamond
- Producer: Anders Hansson

Agnes singles chronology
"Champion" (2006)	"On and On" (2008)	"Release Me" (2008)

Agnes international singles chronology
"Release Me" (2008)	"On and On" (2009)	"I Need You Now" (2009)

Agnes UK singles chronology
"I Need You Now" (2009)	"On and On" (2010)

Audio sample
- file; help

"On and On" is a song by the Swedish singer Agnes and the first single from Dance Love Pop. The song was released to radio stations and as a digital download in Sweden on August 11, 2008. The song is written by Anders Hansson and is released by Roxy Recordings. Just like "Release Me", a French version of the song was recorded for the francophone market called "On se Donne". "On and On" was released in the UK in May, 2010. The song was re-released in the Netherlands on May 24, 2010 as the UK edit.

== Background ==
"On and On" was first heard at the Swedish television show "Sommarkrysset" at TV4 August 16, 2008. It was the song that announced her comeback after leaving Sony Music and being signed to independent label Roxy Recordings, the song was released as a single the same week and after spending a massive 26 weeks on the Swedish Top 60 Singles Chart it was surely considered one of the smash-hits of Sweden the summer of 2008. Since its international release the song has been remade and remixed numerous times, the first remix was the Danish DK Radio Edit which was released as the second single in Denmark. Though it failed to chart, the original edit from the album managed to peak at 16 at the Danish Singles Chart. When to be released all over Europe another edit was made called the "Moonwalker Version". Also this edit managed to enter many charts all over the continent and in France a French version was recorded, "On se Donne".

After "I Need You Now" did not meet the expectations in the UK "On and On" was chosen as the third single. The UK edit was first heard on Friday March 26 on BBC Radio 1's Floorfillers with Scott Mills.

== Critical reception ==
Leanne Durr of "ClickLiverpool" called "On and On" too Europop and that it would fit as Sweden's Eurovision entry, despight this he says that the song have one major good point, Agnes's voice, which is "mature beyond its years". She also said that "if Agnes is looking for any credibility within the dance genre, she should steer clear of this euro-pop sound as it is nowhere near as edgy or as sleek as previous single Release Me."

In contrast, Jessica Pinkett of "Daily Music Guide" stated that with "On and On" Agnes was "back on top form" after "the disappointingly bland 'I Need You Now'". She described On and On as "a catchy, upbeat number which is made all the more anthemic by Agnes' belting diva vocals" and suggested that it could become one of 2010's major summer dance hits.

A similar opinion was brought by "Entertainment-focus.com" who said that "On and On is in a similar vein to Agnes’ previous singles. With Europop beats and dance rhythms the song is aimed squarely at the clubs. A better offering than I Need You Now, the song could catch on in the pre-Summer charts as people get ready for their holidays in the sun or nights out on the town. Agnes’ strong vocals sets the song aside from others in the same genre and we really hope she can find another smash-hit with this track. Though they say that "On and On" probably won't enter the top-ten chart, it is better than other dance pop, such as Cascada.

== Music videos ==
Since the song premiered for the first time in Sweden 2008, three music videos has been filmed.

=== Original Video ===
The first one was produced for the Swedish and Dutch market and had premier on MSN Video one week ahead of the singles official release in Sweden. It was directed by Anders Rune, who also directed the video for Agnes first international single "Release Me". The video was the most shown music video on MSN Video ever. The video was recorded in a suburb to Stockholm during the summer of 2008.

=== International Edition ===
A new music video was filmed to accompany the international release of "On and On". The video was recorded in Gothenburg, Sweden on July 12 and 13, 2009. The video was directed by Torbjörn Martin and produced by Björn Fävremark for STARK production. It premiered on STARK's homepage on September 21, 2009. The video features Agnes alone in numerous different outfits and settings. Most of the video is computer-animated and shows Agnes dancing in front of a light-blue background while confetti or moving white lines surrounds her. Other scenes shows Agnes under water or in front of two giant spotlights.

=== UK Remake ===
In January 2010 Agnes's official website confirmed that a third video was to be made for the UK market. Also this one was filmed in Göteborg and produced by "STARK". The video premiered on March 1, 2010 on AllAroundTheWorld's official YouTube-channel, though it was supposed to be released two weeks earlier. The delay has made AATW to postpone the single to late April/Early May following the album release on April 26.

The UK video is mostly a remake of the international edition, but with some major changes. The, in the second video, common white lines and light-blue background is missing, instead a new look is adopted with close-ups of Agnes in a pony-tail and another one dancing in front of a red screen.

== Live performances ==
"On and On" was the single that announced the comeback of Agnes, after two years of silence. Her first performance with "On and On" was at "Sommarkrysset" in the Swedish TV-channel TV4 on August 16, 2008. And it was also during the show that the comeback was officially announced. Other performances in Sweden are in popular kidsshows "Lilla Melodifestivalen" and "Bobster". She has also performed the song on numerous concerts all around Europe during the summer of 2009.

Before releasing the song in the UK, Agnes started doing promotion in May 2010, performing on the morning show "This Morning" on May 6 and later on Nightingales in Birmingham.

== Track listing ==
Digital Download (Swedish release)

(Released: August 11, 2008) (Roxy)

1. "On and On" [Radio Edit] — 3:52

Digital Download (Danish release)

(Released: June 29, 2009) (Copenhagen) (

1. "On and On" [DK Radio Edit] — 4:07

CD-single (Dutch release)

(Released: February 27, 2009)

1. "On and On" [Radio Edit] — 3:53
2. "On and On" [Extended Version] — 5:47
3. "On and On" [Anotha Ding-an Be-an Version] — 6:20
4. "On and On" [Music video] — 3:53

Digital download (French release)

(Released: 2009) (M6)

1. "On Se Donne (On and On)" [French Radio Edit] — 3:53

Digital Download (Italian release)

(Released: October 30, 2009) (Planet Records)

1. "On and On" [MoonWalker Version] — 4:05
2. "On and On" [Album Version] — 3:50
3. "On and On" [CREDhEAZ Remix] — 3:26
4. "On and On" [Acoustic Version] — 3:49

Maxi-single (Belgian release)

(Released: October 30, 2009) (BIP Club)

1. "On and On" [Radio Edit] — 3:51
2. "On and On" [Moonwalker Version] — 4:06
3. "On and On" [DJ Rebel Radio Remix] — 4:11
4. "On and On" [Nils van Zandt Radio Remix] — 3:51
5. "On and On" [Robert Abigail & Jay Ritchey Remix] — 4:41

Digital download - Remixes (UK release)

(Released: March 10, 2010) (AATW)

1. "On & On" [Cahill Mix] — 05:56
2. "On & On" [Warren Clarke Mix] — 06:59
3. "On & On" [Warren Clarke Dub] — 06:00
4. "On & On" [Benny Benassi Mix] — 05:28
5. "On & On" [Benny Benassi Instrumental Mix] — 05:28
6. "On & On" [7th Heaven Mix] — 07:42

Digital download (UK release)

(Released: May 16, 2010) (AATW)

1. "On & On" [UK Radio Edit] — 03:08
2. "On & On" [Cahill Mix] — 05:56

Digital EP (UK release)

(Released: May 16, 2010) (AATW)

1. "On & On" [UK Radio Edit] — 3:08
2. "On & On" [Acoustic Mix] — 3:48
3. "On & On" [Album Version] — 3:49
4. "On & On" [Cahill Radio Edit] — 3:30
5. "On & On" [Cahill Mix] — 05:56
6. "On & On" [Warren Clarke Remix Edit] — 3:20
7. "On & On" [Benny Benassi Radio Edit] — 3:22

Digital Download - Deluxe Version (German release)

(Released: May 21, 2010) (Warner)

1. "On and On" [UK Radio Edit] — 3:08
2. "On and On" [2Frenchguys Edit] — 3:44
3. "On and On" [Benny Benassi Radio Remix Edit] — 3:25
4. "On and On" [Fuego Remix] — 4:07
5. "On and On" [The Void Remix] — 3:52
6. "On and On" [Nils van Zandt Remix] — 3:51
7. "Release Me" [French Version] — 3:06

CD-single/Digital Download (Dutch re-release)

(Released: May 24, 2010)

1. "On & On" [UK Edit] — 3:08
2. "On & On" [Cahill Radio Edit] — 3:30
3. "On & On" [Original Radio Edit] — 3:51
4. "On & On" [Acoustic] — 3:49

== Chart performance and sales ==
The single was released as a digital download and to Swedish radio on August 11 and entered the chart the same week on place 47. Six weeks later it advanced up to its peak position, 8, where it stayed for 4 weeks. On and on was never released as a physical single in Sweden, only as a digital download. Despite that fact, the single managed to sell in 10,000 copies which resulted in a Gold certification.

In January 2009 Roxy Recordings announced that Agnes would receive an international release in 35 countries all over the world. The first single to be broadcast out to the European market was "Release Me" in Denmark. But on February 10, "On and On" was released as the lead single in the Netherlands and later in Poland. It peaked at place fourteen on the Dutch single chart and at thirteen on the Polish single chart. In June "On and On" was released as the second single in Denmark where it entered the chart at thirty-two and peaked one week later at sixteen. In November the song was released in France as the follow-up to "Release Me".

In late October, "On and On" started to climb the charts in the francophone areas of Europe though it had not yet been released. This was only due to download sales from the album released earlier in 2009. It debuted at 27 in the Belgian-Wallonia Singles Chart and at 37 in the French Download Chart.

"On and On" was released in the United Kingdom with a different sound to the original track, and with a new video. However, due to little support from music TV and radio stations, the single became Agnes' lowest charting song in the UK, peaking at #82 on the Singles Chart; although it managed to score a Top 10 hit on the Dance Chart.

=== Charts ===
Chart (2008–2010)	Peak position
Austria (Ö3 Austria Top 40)	61
Belgium (Ultratop 50 Flanders)	8
Belgium (Ultratop 50 Wallonia)	17
Czech Republic Airplay (ČNS IFPI)	13
Denmark (Tracklisten)	16
Netherlands (Single Top 100)	14
France (SNEP Digital)	14
Germany (GfK)	41
Slovakia (IFPI)	54
Sweden (Sverigetopplistan)	8
Switzerland (Schweizer Hitparade)	37
UK Singles (Official Charts)	82
UK Dance (Official Charts)	10

=== Year-end charts ===
Chart (2008)	Position
Sweden (Sverigetopplistan)	44

=== Sales and certifications ===
Country	Provider	Certification	Sales
Australia	ARIA	Gold	35,000+
France	SNAP	Silver	80,000+
Sweden	IFPI	Gold	10,000+

== Release history ==
Region	Date	Format	Label
Sweden	August 11, 2008	Digital download	Roxy
Sweden	August 11, 2008	Airplay	Roxy
Netherlands	February 10, 2009	Digital download	White Villa
Netherlands	February 27, 2009	CD-single	White Villa
Netherlands	May 24, 2010	Re-release	Cloud 9 Dance
Poland	April 9, 2009	CD-single	Universal Music
Denmark	June 29, 2009	Digital Download	Copenhagen Records
Belgium	October 30, 2009	Digital Download, Maxi-single	BIP Records
Luxembourg	October 30, 2009	Digital Download, Maxi-single	BIP Records
France	September 2009	Radio Single	Sony Music
France	November 16, 2009	Digital download	Sony Music
Italy	October 30, 2009	Radio Single/Digital Download	Sony Music
Germany; Switzerland; Austria	May 14, 2010	Digital Download	Warner Music
Germany; Switzerland; Austria	May 21, 2010	CD-Maxi	Warner Music
United Kingdom	March 26, 2010	Airplay	3 Beat, AATW
United Kingdom	May 16, 2010	Digital download	3 Beat, AATW

== Credits ==
- Vocals: Agnes Carlsson
- Backing Vocals: Martin Rolinski
- Written by: A.Hansson and Steven Diamond
- Produced by: Anders Hansson
- Mixed by: Ronny Lahi at Hanssonic studios
- Mastered by: Erik Broheden
- Photo: Waldemar Hansson
- Artwoork: R.Poortmans

== Official Remixes ==
- 2Frenchguys Edit — 3:44
- 7th Heaven Radio Edit — 07:42
- Anotha Ding-an Be-an Version - 6:20
- Benny Benassi Instrumental — 05:28
- Benny Benassi Radio Edit — 3:22
- Cahill Mix — 05:56
- Cahill Radio Edit — 3:30
- CREDhEAZ Remix - 3:26
- DK Radio edit - 4:07
- Extended Mix - 5:47
- Fuego Remix — 4:07
- Moonwalker Radio Edit - 4:05
- Nils van Zandt Radio Remix - 3:51
- On Se Donne (French Edit) - 3:53
- Original Radio Edit - 3:52
- Robert Abigail & Jay Ritchey Remix - 4:41
- The Void Remix — 3:52
- UK Radio Edit — 3:12
- Warren Clarke Radio Edit — 06:59
- Warren Clarke Dub Mix — 06:00
