= Agnes (singer) =

Swedish recording artist (born 1988)

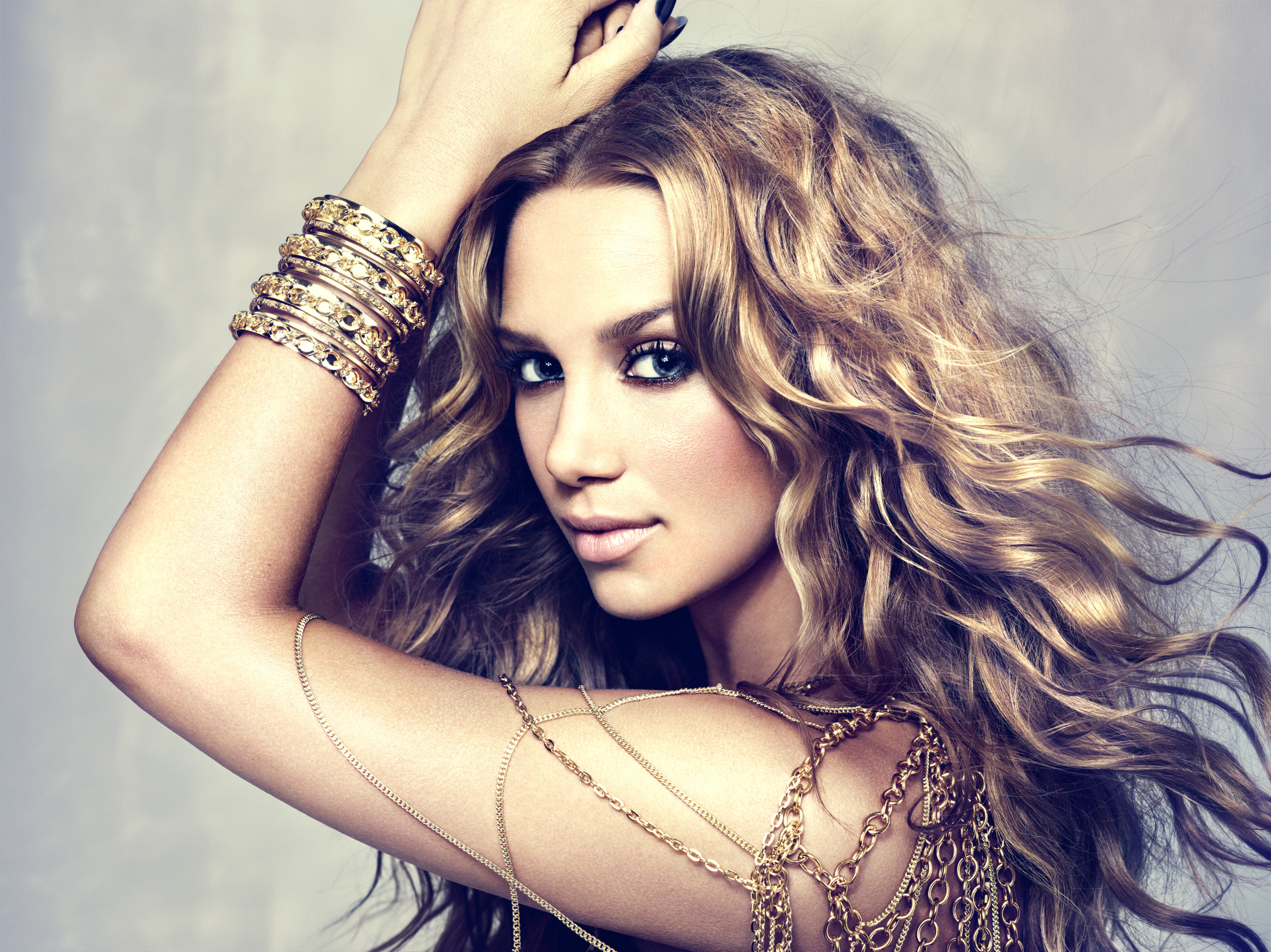
- Agnes in 2012

Background information
- Born: Agnes Emilia Carlsson; 6 March 1988 (age 38); Vänersborg, Sweden
- Genres: R&B; electropop; europop; pop; dance-pop; disco; trance
- Occupations: Singer; songwriter
- Years active: 2005–present
- Label: Universal Music
- Spouse: Vincent Pontare
- Website: Agnes on Facebook

Agnes Emilia Carlsson (born 6 March 1988), known mononymously as Agnes, is a Swedish singer-songwriter. She rose to fame as the winner of Idol 2005, the second season of the Swedish Idol series. She was then signed to Sony Music, through which she released her self-titled debut album, Agnes, and follow-up, Stronger, both of which topped the Swedish Top 60 Albums Chart. In early 2008, it was announced that Agnes had parted ways with her record label, and was now signed to small independent label Roxy Recordings. Released on 28 October 2008, her third album, Dance Love Pop, reached number five in Sweden, 70 in Austria, 38 in France, 45 in Switzerland and 13 in the United Kingdom. With 200,000 albums sold worldwide this is her most successful album, 50,000 albums were sold in France, 40,000 in Sweden. Its first two singles, "On and On" and "Release Me", became international hits, reaching the top-ten in charts worldwide. "Release Me" topped the Billboard Hot Dance Club Songs and peaked at three in the United Kingdom, selling over 4 million copies worldwide.

Agnes has cited Stevie Wonder as her inspiration and has often mentioned Whitney Houston and Janet Jackson as her inspiration in music.

== Early life ==
Agnes Carlsson was born in Vänersborg, Sweden, on 6 March 1988, the youngest of four siblings. Her father was an environmental engineer and her mother a nurse and social worker. Agnes started taking violin lessons and joined a choir at a young age. She sang solo in front of a live audience for the first time whilst still at school. However, it was not until she was 16 that she first had one-on-one singing lessons. Agnes also sang in the Vänersborg choir named "Voice", citing legendary American singer-songwriter Stevie Wonder as her inspiration.

== Career ==
=== 2005–2007: "Idol" and commercial success ===
In the spring of 2005, a 17-year-old Agnes auditioned for the second season of popular Swedish singing competition Idol in Gothenburg, singing "Varje Gång Jag Ser Dig" by Lisa Nilsson. The four judges were all hugely impressed by the strong power of her voice and she successfully passed through to the theatre rounds of the contest. Her vocals continued to impress the judges, and she made it to the semi-finals. To the dismay of the judges however, Agnes did not get a place in the final eleven contestants through public voting, and when she again failed to grab a place through the special 'wildcard' round, they decided to pass her through to the finals as the judges' choice contestant.

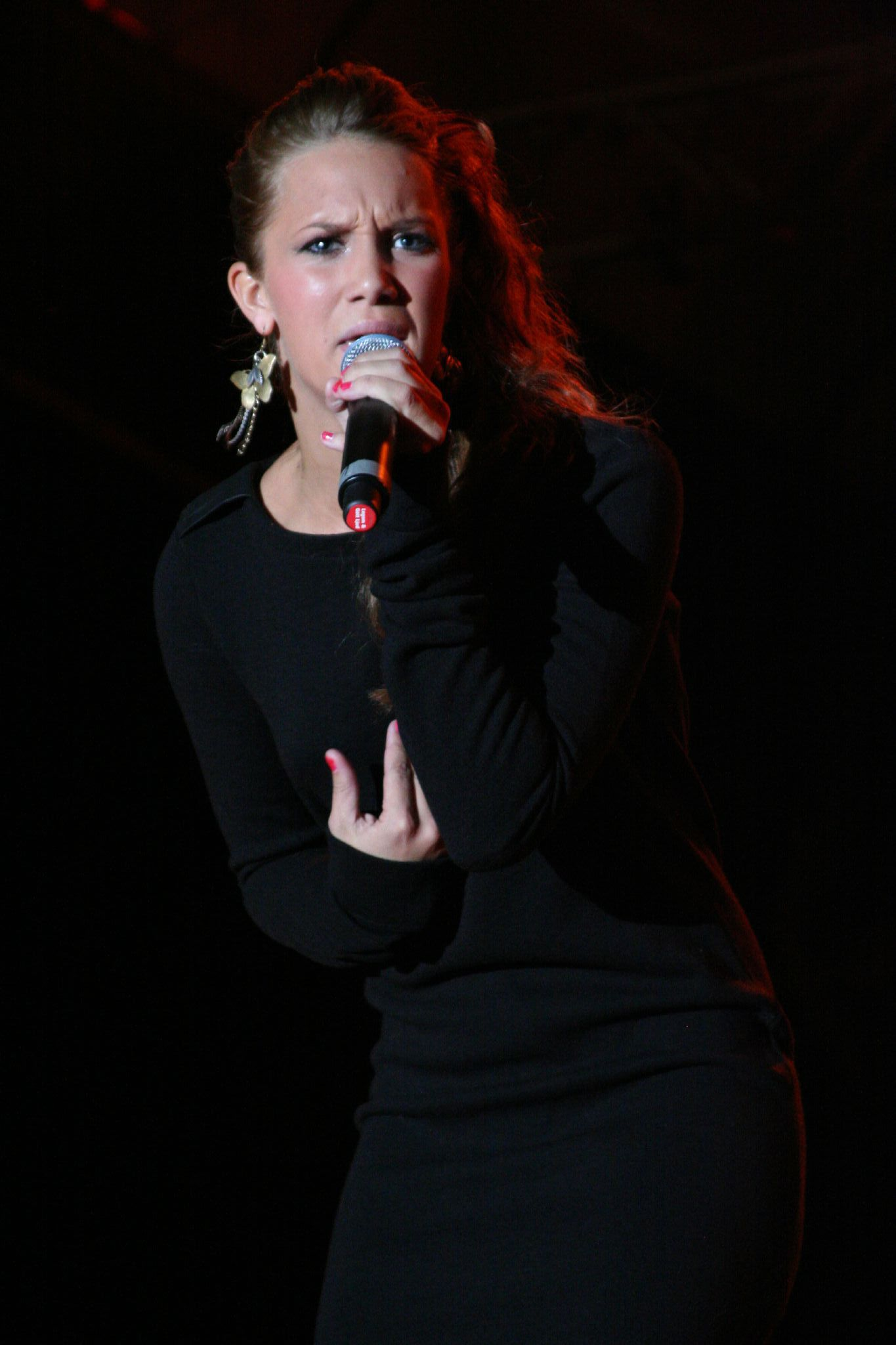
Agnes in 2006

Despite the lack of public support earlier in the competition, Agnes went on to amaze both the judges and the public during every week of the finals, with a result of making it into the grand finale without ever falling into the bottom two or three contestants. With 57% of the one million public votes cast during the finale, she defeated Sebastian Karlsson and was crowned as the second Swedish Idol, and the first female to win the competition.

Immediately after winning Idol, Agnes signed a recording contract with Sony BMG and her debut single, "Right Here Right Now (My Heart Belongs to You)" was released. A week later, the song debuted at number one on the Swedish singles chart, a position it held for six weeks. The song was quickly certified double platinum for the sale of over 40,000 copies in Sweden. Just one week later, on 19 December 2005, her highly anticipated debut album Agnes was released to positive critical reviews that praised the power of Agnes's voice, who was still only eighteen years old. The album debuted at number one on the Swedish albums chart and was certified platinum in its first week of release, Eurovision selling almost 40,000 copies.

In March 2006, whilst touring in support of her debut album, she released her second single, "Stranded". Although it received positive critical reviews, the single did not gain commercial success and stalled in the singles chart at number twenty-seven. Despite this however, her first album continued to enjoy high sales success, selling over 90,000 copies in Sweden by the time it left the Top 60 Albums chart.

On 22 August 2006, only eight months after her Idol win, Agnes's third single "Kick Back Relax" premiered on the TV-show "Sommarkrysset". The song, which would serve as the lead single from her second studio album, was released on 7 September and narrowly missed the top spot on the Swedish singles chart, peaking at number two. Her second album, Stronger was released on 11 October, less than a year after the release of her debut album. Like its predecessor, Stronger debuted at number one on the albums chart, and went on to sell over 50,000 copies in Sweden, with it later being certified platinum. One of the album's tracks, "Love Is All Around" has since been covered by numerous singers on three continents, the most notable being by Australian Idol alumni Ricki Lee Coulter, which peaked at number five in Australia and became one of that country's biggest hits in 2007.

On 15 November 2006, Agnes released "Champion", the second single from Stronger, which peaked at number nineteen. In early 2007, she embarked on her second national. In December, she and her fellow Idol contestant Måns Zelmerlöw joined for a huge Christmas campaign for clothing store MQ. In order to promote the company, they duetted on a cover of the Mariah Carey song "All I Want for Christmas Is You", which peaked at number three on the Swedish singles chart and was certified gold for the sale of 10,000 copies.

=== 2008–2010: Dance Love Pop, departure from Sony BMG & international launch ===
In early 2008, it was announced that Agnes had parted ways with her record label Sony BMG, with Agnes citing "creative differences" behind the split. She then signed to independent label Roxy Recordings and on 11 August, "On and On", the first single from her upcoming third studio, was released. The song marked a change in Agnes' music style, going towards a more dance and club style, while moving away from her original pop and R&B. Agnes first performed the song live on 16 August 2008 during the Swedish TV-show "Sommarkrysset". The single spent four consecutive weeks at its peak of number 8 on the Swedish singles chart and hit the top spot on the club chart, gaining a gold certification. The same club style would be reflected in Agnes's third studio album, Dance Love Pop, which she had written together with Swedish producer and songwriter Anders Hansson. The album was released on 28 October 2008 and debuted on the Swedish albums chart at number five with first week sales of 10,000 copies. On 24 November, "Release Me" was released as the second single from the album, peaking at number nine on the Swedish chart and being certified gold. Despite the song's success, it failed to match that of the album's first single.

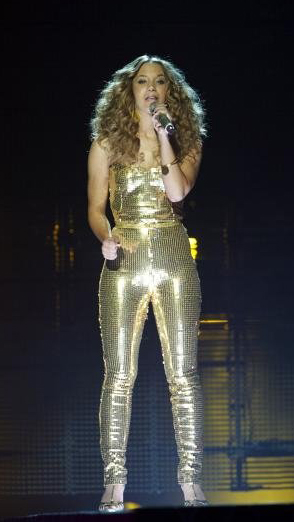
Agnes performing "Love Love Love" in the Swedish Melodifestivalen 2009

In October 2008, it was rumored that Agnes would compete in Melodifestivalen 2009, the competition that would decide Sweden's entry to the Eurovision Song Contest. Agnes later confirmed this in an interview in the Swedish newspaper Göteborgsposten, and it was further confirmed on 2 December 2008 by SVT. The song "Love Love Love" was chosen as her official entry song. The song was written by Anders Hansson, who had previously worked with Agnes on her third studio album, co-writing almost all of the record's tracks, including the first two singles, On and On and "Release Me". Originally, it was said that Agnes was to perform "Love Love Love" as a duet with fellow Swedish singer and former A-teens member Marie Serneholt, but when it was later decided that Serneholt would be competing on her own, Agnes performed "Love Love Love" as a solo performance. On 28 February 2009, Agnes advanced to the final round of Melodifestivalen 2009 and eventually achieved 8th place with 40 points. On 28 February, she officially released "Love Love Love" as the third single from Dance Love Pop, peaking at number four on the Swedish charts. The song was included on the two-disc re-release of her third studio album, released on 1 April 2009. Following the re-release, Dance Love Pop returned to the Swedish albums chart, peaking at number 12.

During Agnes' attempts to promote Melodifestivalen in the spring of 2009, "Release Me" began to receive attention from abroad, with Roxy Recordings later stating that the song would receive an international release. The move marked the first time that Agnes' music would be distributed outside Sweden. The single made its first international appearance in Denmark, where it peaked at number six selling over 25,000 copies, but most of all, "Release Me" gained massive remarks in the UK, and Agnes was signed to the small independent record company 3Beat, where the song received its official UK release on 31 May 2009, proving to be a big hit, being picked up by most music channels, also with Agnes performing the song and a few others at G-A-Y, the UK's biggest gay nightclub venue and also a live performance on GMTV, one of the UK's biggest breakfast shows. Release Me hit the top of Radio 1's A-list playlist, and eventually debuted at number three in the UK Singles Chart, and continued to ride high in the top ten for many weeks. After eight weeks, it managed to get a Silver certification with over 300,000 copies sold. In Ireland, the song debuted at thirty-eight and later peaked at ten. "Release Me" continued to reign in European charts during the summer and autumn, being released in most European countries, and becoming a success in France, Belgium, Italy, and Germany. Agnes made her first appearance outside of Europe in late July after being signed by Warner Music in Australia with "Release Me" as her first Australian entering the Australian chart at number eleven in its first week of release.

Agnes' second international single was "On and On" which was first released in the Netherlands where it peaked at number fourteen. Later that year, "On and On" started to climb the charts in the francophone areas of Europe due to digital downloads from Dance Love Pop. It debuted at number twenty-seven in the Belgian-(Wallon) Singles Chart and after its release, peaked at seventeen. In the Belgian (Flemish) Singles Chart, it peaked at eight, making it the second top-ten hit in Belgium. A new version had been recorded for the French release, called "On Se Donne", but even before it was released as a single, it peaked at number fourteen on the French Download Chart and thirty-seven in the Swiss Singles Chart. "On and On" was released as the second single in Germany, Austria, Switzerland and Hungary in May 2010, and as the third single for the UK in June.

In the UK, the second single was "I Need You Now", which was rerecorded from the previous version on Dance Love Pop. "I Need You Now" was officially released in the UK on 16 November 2009 and peaked at 40 in the UK Singles Chart. But fared better in the dance chart at 5. "I Need You Now" was then released in Sweden on 23 November 2009 as an iTunes exclusive single. Later the same week, it was released to other digital markets and despite no promotion and little airplay, it entered the Swedish Singles Chart at number ten and later peaked at number eight, making it Agnes' seventh top-ten hit in Sweden. The song was also released in a few other countries such as Italy, The Netherlands, Norway, and Australia but failed to enter any charts.

In February 2010, it was confirmed that Agnes's third French single would be "Sometimes I Forget" and would serve as the follow-up to the massive success of "Release Me" and "On and On", which combined had sold over 160,000 copies in France.

In July 2009, the major American record company Geffen Records announced that they had signed Agnes and would release "Release Me" in the U.S. on 18 August 2009. She also received a signing bonus of 1 million dollars ($1,000,000). This made Agnes the first and to date only Swedish Idol contestant to be launched in America. Before landing on Interscope/Geffen's table, three of America's biggest record companies fought over Agnes and her hit potential. In early 2010, a team consisting of 35 people that, in 2009, was assigned to make Lady Gaga the next star, started to plan Agnes' U.S. launch.

Agnes made her first appearance in the U.S. on 27 August 2009 at a release party for her single "Release Me". Among the guests was the CEO of Interscope Records, Ron Fair, and he made a comment about their new signing "She has it all. She is an amazing singer, looks good, is fearless and humble." The launch of Agnes in the U.S. and Canada continued during the spring of 2010 and in the summer of 2010 "Release Me" was added to mainstream radio.

On 19 June 2010, Agnes and Björn Skifs performed at the Wedding of Victoria, Crown Princess of Sweden, and Daniel Westling. The song When You Tell the World You're Mine was the official wedding song, written especially for this occasion. The lyrics were written by Jörgen Elofsson, who has worked with Agnes before, and the music was written by Jörgen Elofsson & John Lundvik. As a tribute to Victoria, Crown Princess of Sweden, Prince Daniel, Duke of Västergötland engaged Elofsson to compose a song that expresses what people feel when they fall in love. The song entered the Sweden Top 60 Singles at fourteen and peaked at one the week after. It also peaked at 19 in Finland.

=== 2011–2013: Veritas and Collection ===
Agnes's fourth album Veritas, was released in September 2012. The first official single was "Don't Go Breaking My Heart," which premiered on 5 August 2011 on the show Mr. Gay Sweden. The single failed to chart on the official Swedish singles chart, though through high digital sales, it peaked at three on the digital chart. This was due to low streams on Spotify, which of the official single chart consists of since 2010.

On 28 May 2012 Agnes released the lead single, "One Last Time", from Veritas. The single was, unlike her previous singles, released in Sweden only. Earlier in May, the single had leaked onto the Swedish Spotify, and was later dispersed. During its first day of release, the single quickly reached the top ten iTunes chart. In an interview Agnes also said that her goal with the album was to be involved with all the songs. Her American record company Interscope wanted her to move to the U.S. and record the album there, but Agnes didn't feel "at home" and couldn't find the people that she wanted to work with. Therefore, she decided to go back to Sweden and record her album there. In a press release from the record company Agnes commented on the album name; "I like how the word 'Veritas' sounds, how it looks and especially what it stands for. The word fits very well with the whole idea behind this album."

On 31 August 2012, the song "All I Want Is You" was released as the second single in Sweden and promoted with a performance at Swedish television show Sommarkrysset. A few days before, on 29 August, American blogger Perez Hilton premiered the song together with a lyric video exclusively on his website, remarking that "Agnes Doesn't Want Much… All She Wants Is You! And all WE want it more Agnes! Seems like a fair trade to us!" Agnes has described "All I Want Is You" as feverish and ambiguous, perhaps a declaration of love, but equally a story of obsession. The song did not chart as well as her previous single "One Last Time" however, failing to reach the Swedish charts, although it did manage to peak at number nine on the official download chart. In June 2013, the third single from Veritas, "Got Me Good", remixed by Bassflow, was released.

Agnes and singer Darin Zanyar both appeared as the interval act Swedish Pop Voices during the second semifinal of the Eurovision Song Contest 2013 in Malmö on 16 May. In late 2013, Agnes appeared as one of the singers featured on the TV4 show Så mycket bättre. Her first greatest hits album was released on 27 December 2013, titled Collection.

=== 2019–present: Return to music, Magic Still Exists and Beautiful Madness ===
Seven years after her last release, on 8 May 2019, Agnes revealed on her Instagram page that she would be featured on the posthumous Avicii single "Tough Love". Before his death, Avicii had sent a message to Vincent Pontare and Salem Al Fakir of Vargas & Lagola stating that he wanted the song to be a duet by a "real couple" or a couple that have worked together enough to be almost considered a "couple". "Tough Love" was described by DJ Mag as featuring Indian influences in a melodic passage that was inspired by Avicii studying the music of northwest India, which he had played for Pontare and Al Fakir before his death.

Following her return to music, Agnes also founded her own record label, Senga. On 25 October 2019, Agnes released the EP Nothing Can Compare, which was preceded by the singles "Limelight" and "I Trance". The EP sampled the likes of Donna Summer and voices from the 1990 cult documentary film Paris is Burning, and was described in the media as taking a "rawer and darker" musical direction than her previous work.

On 7 February 2020, Agnes released the single "Goodlife". On 21 August 2020, Agnes announced her upcoming fifth studio album Magic Still Exists, her first in eight years, and released lead single "Fingers Crossed", which she co-wrote with Vargas & Lagola. An accompanying music video was directed by SWIM CLUB, inspired by Alejandro Jodorowsky's 1973 film The Holy Mountain and Swedish abstract artist Hilma af Klint. Agnes stated that "Fingers Crossed" was "inspired by the sense that nothing is impossible, because nothing is impossible! It's a song that can lift you up to new dimensions and like a peaceful tank it crushes everything in its way. The song does not excuse itself and I don't excuse myself. I welcome you now to my party, and it's my party so… I can do what I want to." On 21 May 2021, Agnes released the second single "24 Hours".

Magic Still Exists was released on 22 October 2021 to critical acclaim alongside promotional single Here Comes The Night. The Guardian called the album a "pop miracle" and a "soothing balm perfect for fleeting dancefloor moments". It was listed in The Guardian's top 50 albums of 2021, with journalist Laura Snapes relating the music to that of Lady Gaga, Donna Summer and Queen, whilst avoiding "pastiche on the strength of [the] songwriting". Commercially, the album reached #7 in Sweden and had the highest amount of vinyl sellings in its debuting week.

Agnes herself called her new signature style "Spiritual Disco", with the idea of incorporating esoteric and motivational spoken mantras taking inspiration by gospel and queer underground culture into pulsating disco synth-pop beats and vivid orchestral palettes.

The third and final single Love And Appreciation was sent to Swedish radios in summer 2022. The single was sponsored in the advertisement for Antonio Banderas's fragrance THE ICON.

Agnes kept her new signature style for subsequent releases anticipating her sixth album in studio. These subsequent releases include electro-funk midtempo "Twisted Mind" (2023), co-produced with Purple Disco Machine and later included in his album Exotica; the ethereal runway anthem "Balenciaga Covered Eyes" (2024), co-written with Hannah Wilson; and the pounding waacking earworm "Milk" (2025), inspired by Daft Punk and co-written with Danny Yxilon. A trailer for the album was released on 18 May 2025, suggesting its title to be Beautiful Madness.

Agnes mentioned visual artist Mark Rothko for the inspiration behind the creative process of her sixth studio album. "To me art is an adventure into an unknown world, which can be explored only by those willing to take the risk. Use less elements and give these every element more space. This is what I'm looking for the sounds of my upcoming project."

== Musical style and influences ==
Agnes started out in Swedish Idol, and when it came to choosing the songs for the competition she had a particular taste of genres. The first song she ever sang on Swedish television was "Varje gång jag ser dig" (Each time I see you), a soul ballad with a strong love lyrics. Throughout the competition, she continued to impress with her vocals in songs like Flashdance... What a Feeling, I'm So Excited, Young Hearts Run Free, and Can't Take My Eyes Off You. Already in this early stage of her career, she cited soul-singer Stevie Wonder as her inspiration. Both her self-titled debut album and her second album consisted strongly of R&B, soul, and pop songs, continuing the path she began during her time in "Idol".

But after leaving Sony Music and signing on to Roxy, she geared towards the dance and club genre, she was introduced to the songwriter and producer Anders Hansson. Agnes recalls when his name first came up for the album "They said maybe you should just meet first and see if you like each other, as opposed to just working together". They got on – so well that Hansson ended up producing an album that helped Agnes realise her vision, Dance Love and Pop together in one album "A lot of things changed for me when I started to work with this album. I really liked it, because I knew that I wanted to do something totally different to the two others. I wanted to do uptempo, disco-orientated songs and I really wanted to work with Anders because he felt the same way". When released the first single "On and On" from her third album, it immediately showed a clear change of artistic direction for her music. This was clearly observed by the critics who all homaged her new musical style. Other remarks are "The album fits the dance floor at any club. A mood trigger with bubbling enjoyment". and "Agnes Carlsson once and for all gets rid of the "Idol"-dust".

Agnes has often cited strong female soul singers like Beyoncé, Whitney Houston, and Janet Jackson as her inspiration in music. In an interview, she said that whenever she was home alone she would play Whitney Houston and Beyoncé's songs "at the highest volume" and sing along. "Whitney's voice is so emotional, and if there's one thing I learnt from listening to her, it's that it's important to put emotion in".

== Personal life ==
Agnes is married to Vincent Pontare, whom she has been dating since 2009. The couple had their first child in October 2022. She currently lives in Stockholm.

== Discography ==
- Agnes (2005)
- Stronger (2006)
- Dance Love Pop (2008)
- Veritas (2012)
- Magic Still Exists (2021)
- Beautiful Madness (2026)

== See also ==
- List of awards and nominations received by Agnes Carlsson
- Swedish pop music

Preceded by Daniel Lindström	Winner of Swedish Idol; 2005	Succeeded by Markus Fagervall
Preceded by Neverstore	Winner of MTV Europe Music Awards for best Swedish Act; 2009	Succeeded by Swedish House Mafia
