= Dance Love Pop =

Studio album by Agnes
- Released: 29 October 2008
- Recorded: 2008
- Genres: Pop; dance
- Length: 40:05
- Label: Roxy
- Producer: Anders Hansson

Agnes chronology
Stronger (2006)	Dance Love Pop (2008)	Veritas (2012)

Alternative cover
- UK cover

Singles from Dance Love Pop
- 1. "On and On" Released: 11 August 2008; 2. "Release Me" Released: 24 November 2008; 3. "Love Love Love" Released: 28 February 2009; 4. "I Need You Now" Released: 9 October 2009; 5. "Sometimes I Forget" Released: 16 November 2010

Dance Love Pop is the third studio album by Swedish singer Agnes, released originally on 29 October 2008 in Sweden. This was Agnes' first studio album since 2006 and her comeback to the music stage. The album is written and produced by Swedish songwriter Anders Hansson and geared towards the dance and club genre. When released the first single "On and On" it immediately showed a clear change of artistic direction for her music. This was clearly observed by the critics who all homaged her new musical style. In Sweden, a deluxe edition of the album titled Dance Love Pop: The Love Love Love Edition was released, featuring the original 10 tracks plus new song "Love Love Love", of which Agnes competed with in the Swedish drafts for Eurovision Song Contest 2009 in Moscow. The deluxe edition also included remixes and music videos of the album's singles and re-entered the official Swedish Top 60 Album Chart peaking at number 12. A re-release of the album was also made in France, where the "Edition Collector" was released on 18 January 2010 and peaked at forty-seven.

The album originally peaked at five in Sweden and the deluxe edition at twelve. In France it stayed on the charts for twenty-nine weeks and peaked at thirty-eight in the physical chart and forty-three on the digital chart. In Germany, Austria and Switzerland, the album was released by Warner Music and it peaked at sixty-eight in Germany, at seventy in Austria and at forty-five in Switzerland. In the UK it peaked at 13 on the Dance Chart.

== Background and development ==
The name of the album was first revealed on 13 September 2008 on Swedish radio show "Tracks", the host, Kaj Kindvall declared that the name would be Dance! Love! Pop!. The spelling with exclamation marks after each words was later dispatch by the label Roxy Recordings and changed to merely "Dance Love Pop". The album was described as follow: "it covers the three things that the music is all about [...];Christmas music that has a twist of pop and is about love".

With this album, Agnes together with her producer and fellow songwriter geared towards the dance and club genre. Agnes recalls when Hansson's name first came up for the album: "They said maybe you should just meet first and see if you like each other, as opposed to just working together." They got on – so well that Hansson ended up producing an album that helped Agnes realize her vision, Dance Love and Pop together in one album She added, "A lot of things changed for me when I started to work with this album. I really liked it, because I knew that I wanted to do something totally different to the two others. I wanted to do uptempo, disco-orientated songs and I really wanted to work with Anders because he felt the same way."

For the international release of the album, some of the songs were remastered and remixed. The second UK single, "I Need You Now", was entirely re-recorded for its release. For the German market, a new song called "You Rain" was recorded and "Big Blue Wall" was remixed. Agnes is also due to record a couple of new songs for the US release of the album. A few new tracks have been added for the international release, "You Rain", "Secret Love" and "If I Could Build My Whole World Around You". For the francophone market the French version of "Release Me", called "Réalise" was also included. Just like "I Need You Now", another ballad called "Big Blue Wall" has been re-recorded in to a dance-music version called "the Moonwalker version" and is featured on the album as well as the original version from the Swedish release which is renamed "the Piano version".

== Chart performance ==
The album entered the Swedish official chart on 6 November 2008 just a few days after it was released on October 28. It entered at five and that was also its peak, the following weeks it started to fall and left the chart after nine weeks to later re-enter it in late April due to the re-release of the album, the Love Love Love Edition, and peaked at twelve. After staying on the chart for another six weeks it left it for good with a total of fifteen weeks. In France it entered and peaked the French Albums Chart on 12 September 2009 at thirty-eight and stayed on the chart for a total of twenty-nine weeks leaving on 24 April 2009. As in Sweden, a re-release of the album was made called the "Edition Collector". The first version of the album stayed on the chart for fifteen weeks and the latter stayed there for fourteen weeks peaking at forty-seven. The album later received a Silver certification in France where 30,000 albums were sold.

In Germany the album peaked at sixty-eight with sales of 20,000 copies, and in Austria and Switzerland it peaked at seventy and forty-five. In Poland it peaked at fourteen and in the United Kingdom it peaked at 112 on the official charts and peaked at 13 on the dance albums chart.

== Singles ==
"Release Me", was the last song to be recorded for Dance Love Pop since the record company felt that the album would need another track. It was chosen as the lead single internationally, except from Sweden and the Netherlands where "On and On" was the lead single. It became the album's best-selling and most popular single, and peaked at number one in the Billboard Hot Dance Club Play. The song also peaked high on the charts all over Europe, such as number 3 the UK Singles Chart selling over 4 million copies, and 7 in the French Singles Chart. The single sold "Gold" in Australia, Denmark, Sweden, Germany and Italy; "Silver" in the United Kingdom and "Platinum" in Norway.

The second international single, "On and On", was released as the follow-up to "Release Me" with massive expectations. The song managed to chart in the French and Swiss Singles Charts even before its release, in digital sales from the album only. It did also chart in Sweden, Denmark and Belgium. In the UK, "On and On" was rejected as the second single though it was meant from the start as Agnes' follow up in the UK and Ireland. The song was later released at the third single in the UK and peaked at #82 in the official charts and #10 on the dance chart. In Sweden, this was the single that announced Agnes comeback and forthcoming album.

The third single from the album was "Love Love Love" and was only released in Sweden. The song was Agnes' entrant in Sweden's Eurovision Song Contest selection process Melodifestivalen. After proceeding to the final from the fourth semi-final, the song placed eighth out of the eleven entries. "Love Love Love" is written by Anders Hansson and was released as a one track CD single by Roxy Recordings. It peaked at four on the Swedish Official Single Chart.

"I Need You Now" was the fourth single in Sweden, the third in Belgium, the Netherlands and Italy and the second single in the United Kingdom, Norway and Australia. On the original track listing of Dance Love Pop this song was a ballad, the solution was to re-record it as a dance-music song for the single release. The song failed to match the success of its predecessors and only charted at number 40 in the UK. In Sweden it peaked at eight, in Slovakia at fifteen, in Belgium at twenty (Flanders) and two (Wallonia) and in Ukraine at one.

The album's fifth single was "Sometimes I Forget", it was released in France as the third single in mid-2010 and in Italy as the fourth single.

== Critical reception ==
Professional ratings
Review scores
Source	Rating
Aftonbladet	3/5 stars
Arbetarbladet	2/5 stars
Borås Tidning	3/5 stars
Göteborgs-Posten	3/5 stars
Metro	3/5 stars
Norrköpings Tidningar	4/5 stars
Sydsvenska Dagbladet	2/5 stars
TeenToday	4/5 stars
Östgöta Correspondenten	4/5 stars

Sandra Wall from Norrköpings Tidningar writes "she makes an album that fits the dance floor at any club. A mood trigger with bubbling enjoyment." and "Agnes has been keeping great standard since she won Idol, but now when she's increased the tempo, it becomes really great. The lyrics is about messy relationships and aren't that deep. Which fits perfectly on the dance floor."

"Don't let you be fooled by the childish cover, it's passably fallacious" says Anneli Wikström in Metro, she also writes that the album is "far from bubblegum and children's party" and says that it's unexpectedly mature and an eye wink with the 80's. Lisa Appelqvist from Kristianstadsbladet compares Agnes to Madonna and Whitney Houston. She says "With her reincarnated voice from the divas of the 70's she burst out "Release Me". Hansson's craft work almost breaths Madonna's "Like a prayer" with gospel/cello and Agnes haplessly frustrated pray." She continues with "Only 21 years old and I have a feeling that Agnes has a lot to offer us in the future. [...] Agnes Carlsson once and for all gets rid of the "Idol"-dust." Göteborgsposten's Johan Rylander says that the cooperation with Anders Hansson is "the improvement Agnes aspired for since she won Idol 2005. The bombastic Celine-ballads are gone and modern dance-pop of great quality (like Release me) have replaced it."

== Track listing ==
=== Standard Editions ===
No.	Title	Writer(s)	Length
1.	"Release Me"	Agnes, A. Hansson, S. Vaughn	4:16
2.	"On and On"	A. Hansson, S. Diamond	3:52
3.	"Love Me Senseless"	A. Hansson, T. Leah	4:40
4.	"How Do You Know"	A. Hansson, R. Shaw	3:50
5.	"I Need You Now"	A. Hansson, S. Vaughn	3:46
6.	"Look at Me Now"	A. Hansson, S. Diamond, Agnes	3:56
7.	"Don't Pull Your Love Out"	A. Hansson, K. DioGuardi	3:15
8.	"Open Up Your Eyes"	A. Hansson, S. Diamond, Agnes	3:37
9.	"Sometimes I Forget"	A. Hansson, S. Diamond, Agnes	4:15
10.	"Big Blue Wall"	A. Hansson, S. Diamond	4:39

UK track listing
No.	Title	Writer(s)	Length
1.	"Release Me"	Agnes, A. Hansson, S. Vaughn, T. Samoy,	4:16
2.	"I Need You Now (Extended Mix)"	A. Hansson, S. Vaughn	4:37
3.	"On & On (UK Radio Edit)"	A. Hansson, S. Diamond	3:11
4.	"Secret Love"	A. Hansson, S. Vaughn	3:32
5.	"Sometimes I Forget"	A. Hansson, S. Diamond, Agnes	4:16
6.	"You Rain"	A. Hansson, S. Vaughn	3:38
7.	"Big Blue Wall (Moonwalker Version)"	A. Hansson, S. Vaughn	3:16
8.	"Love Love Love"	A. Hansson	3.02
9.	"How Do You Know (International Version)"	A. Hansson, R Shaw	3:35
10.	"Love Me Senseless (International Version)"	A. Hansson, T. Leah	4:33
11.	"If I Could Build My Whole World Around You"		2:50
12.	"Release Me (Acoustic Version)"	Agnes, A. Hansson, S. Vaughn, T. Samoy	3:07
13.	"I Need You Now (Original Mix)"	A. Hansson, S. Vaughn	3:07
14.	"On & On (Acoustic Version)"	A. Hansson, S. Diamond	3:51
15.	"Big Blue Wall (Original Version)"	A. Hansson, R. Shaw	4:36
16.	"On & On (Album Version) [iTunes Bonus Track]"	A. Hansson, S. Diamond	3:49
17.	"Big Blue Wall (Cahill Radio Edit) [iTunes Bonus Track]"	A. Hansson, S. Vaughn	3:16
Total length:			55:19

French track listing
No.	Title	Writer(s)	Length
1.	"Réalise (Release Me) (Radio Edit)"	Agnes, A. Hansson, S. Vaughn, T. Samoy	3:08
2.	"On and On"	A. Hansson, S. Diamond	3:52
3.	"Love Love Love"	A. Hansson	2:59
4.	"Love Me Senseless"	A. Hansson, T. Leah	4:40
5.	"How do You Know"	A. Hansson, R. Shaw	3:50
6.	"I Need You Now"	A. Hansson, S. Vaughn	3:46
7.	"Look at Me Now"	A. Hansson, S. Diamond, Agnes	3:56
8.	"Don't Pull Your Love Out"	A. Hansson, K. DioGuardi	3:15
9.	"Open Up Your Eyes"	A. Hansson, S. Diamond, Agnes	3:37
10.	"Sometimes I Forget"	A. Hansson, S. Diamond, Agnes	4:15
11.	"Big Blue Wall"	A. Hansson, S. Vaughn	4:39
12.	"Release Me (Original Version)"	A. Hansson, S. Vaughn, A. Carlsson	4:16
13.	"Release Me (Acoustic Version)"	A. Hansson, S. Vaughn, A. Carlsson	4:13
14.	"On and On (Acoustic Version)"	A. Hansson, S. Diamond	2:42
Total length:			52:08

Italy V2.0 track listing
No.	Title	Writer(s)	Length
1.	"Release Me"	Agnes, A. Hansson, S. Vaughn, T. Samoy	4:14
2.	"On and On (Moonwalker Version)"	A. Hansson, S. Diamond	4:05
3.	"I Need You Now"	A. Hansson, S. Vaughn	3:45
4.	"How Do You Know"	A. Hansson, R. Shaw	3:48
5.	"On and On (Original Mix Album Version)"	A. Hansson, S. Diamond	3:49
6.	"Love Me Senseless"	A. Hansson, T. Leah	4:38
7.	"Look at Me Now"	A. Hansson, S. Diamond, Agnes	3:55
8.	"Don't Pull Your Love Out"	A. Hansson, K. DioGuardi	3:13
9.	"Open Up Your Eyes"	A. Hansson, S. Diamond, Agnes	3:35
10.	"Sometimes I Forget"	A. Hansson, S. Diamond, Agnes	4:14
11.	"Big Blue Wall (Moonwalker Version)"	A. Hansson, S. Vaughn	3:14
12.	"Love Love Love (Moonwalker Version)"	A. Hansson	3:00
13.	"Release Me (Cahill Radio Edit)"	A. Hansson, S. Vaughn, A. Carlsson	3:12
14.	"Release Me (Acoustic Version)"	A. Hansson, S. Vaughn, Agnes	3:05

Italy V3.0 track listing
No.	Title	Writer(s)	Length
1.	"Release Me"	Agnes, A. Hansson, S. Vaughn, T. Samoy	4:14
2.	"On And On (Cahill Radio Edit)"	A. Hansson, S. Diamond	3:35
3.	"I Need You Now (Cahill Radio Edit)"	A. Hansson, S. Vaughn	3:17
4.	"How Do You Know"	A. Hansson, R. Shaw	3:48
5.	"Love Me Senseless"	A. Hansson, T. Leah	4:39
6.	"Look At Me Know"	A. Hansson, S. Diamond, Agnes	3:55
7.	"Don't Pull Tour Love Out"	A. Hansson, K. DioGuardi	3:13
8.	"Open Up Your Eyes"	A. Hansson, S. Diamond, Agnes	3:35
9.	"Sometimes I Forget (Album Version)"	A. Hansson, S. Diamond, Agnes	4:14
10.	"Big Blue Wall (Moonwalker Version)"	A. Hansson, S. Vaughn	3:14
11.	"Love Love Love (Moonwalker Version)"	A. Hansson	3:00
12.	"I Need You Now (Original Mix)"	A. Hansson, S. Vaughn	3:46
13.	"Release Me (Cahill Radio Edit)"	A. Hansson, S. Vaughn, A. Carlsson	3:12
14.	"Release Me (Acoustic Version)"	A. Hansson, S. Vaughn, Agnes	3:05
15.	"On And On (Original Mix Album Version)"	A. Hansson, S. Diamond	3:50
16.	"On And On (Cahill Mix)"	A. Hansson, S. Diamond	6:00
17.	"On And On (Moonwalker Version)"	A. Hansson, S. Diamond	4:05
18.	"I Need You Now (Cahill Extended Mix)"	A. Hansson, S. Vaughn	6:24
19.	"I Need You Now (UK Mix)"	A. Hansson, S. Vaughn	3:51
20.	"I Need You Now (Alex K Mix)"	A. Hansson, S. Vaughn	6:44
21.	"I Need You Now (Grant Nelson Mix)"	A. Hansson, S. Vaughn	7:35
22.	"Sometimes I Forget (Radio Edit)"	A. Hansson, S. Diamond, Agnes	3:39
23.	"Sometimes I Forget (The Gorque Remix)"	A. Hansson, S. Diamond, Agnes	3:53

German track listing
No.	Title	Writer(s)	Length
1.	"Big Blue Wall (Moonwalker Version)"	A. Hansson & S. Vaughn	3:16
2.	"Release Me"	Agnes, A. Hansson, S. Vaughn	4:16
3.	"On and On (Moonwalker Version)"	Anders Hansson & Steve Diamond	4:07
4.	"Love Me Senseless"	A. Hansson & T. Leah	4:14
5.	"I Need You Now"	A. Hansson & S. Vaughn	3:47
6.	"You Rain"	A. Hansson & S. Vaughn	4:16
7.	"How Do You Know"	A. Hansson & R. Shaw	3:50
8.	"Open Up Your Eyes"	A. Hansson, Agnes Carlsson & S. Diamond	3:37
9.	"Don't Pull Your Love Out"	A. Hansson & K. DioGuardi	3:16
10.	"Sometimes I Forget (Album Version)"	A. Hansson, Agnes Carlsson & S. Diamond	4:16
11.	"Release Me (Acoustic Version)"	A. Hansson, Agnes Carlsson & S. Vaughn	4:15
12.	"Big Blue Wall (Piano Version)"	A. Hansson & S. Vaughn	4:39
13.	"On and On (Acoustic Version)"	Anders Hansson & Steve Diamond	2:41
14.	"Look At Me Now"	A. Hansson, Agnes Carlsson & S. Diamond	3:57
15.	"Release Me (Moguai Remix)"	A. Hansson, Agnes Carlsson & S. Vaughn	8:04

=== Deluxe / Limited Editions ===
Edition Collector (France)
No.	Title	Writer(s)	Length
1.	"Release Me (Original Version)"	Agnes, A. Hansson, S. Vaughn, T. Samoy	4:16
2.	"On and On"	A. Hansson, S. Diamond	3:52
3.	"Love Love Love"	A. Hansson	2:59
4.	"Love Me Senseless"	A. Hansson, T. Leah	4:40
5.	"How do You Know"	A. Hansson, R. Shaw	3:50
6.	"I Need You Now"	A. Hansson, S. Vaughn	3:46
7.	"Look at Me Now"	A. Hansson, S. Diamond, Agnes	3:56
8.	"Don't Pull Your Love Out"	A. Hansson, K. DioGuardi	3:15
9.	"Open Up Your Eyes"	A. Hansson, S. Diamond, Agnes	3:37
10.	"Sometimes I Forget"	A. Hansson, S. Diamond, Agnes	4:15
11.	"Big Blue Wall"	A. Hansson, S. Vaughn	4:39
12.	"Réalise (Release Me) (Radio Edit)"	A. Hansson, S. Vaughn, A. Carlsson	3:08
13.	"On and On (On Se Donne)"	A. Hansson, S. Diamond	3:52
14.	"Release Me (Acoustic Version)"	A. Hansson, S. Vaughn, A. Carlsson	4:13
15.	"On and On (Acoustic Version)"	A. Hansson, S. Diamond	2:42
16.	"Release Me (Acoustic Version P3 Live Session)"	A. Hansson, S. Vaughn, Agnes	3:48
17.	"I Need You Now (International Version)"	A. Hansson, S. Vaughn	3:00
18.	"You Rain"	A. Hansson, S. Vaughn	4:15
19.	"On and on (Video)"	A. Hansson, S. Diamond,	4:07
Total length:			01:12:10

Australian Deluxe Edition
No.	Title	Writer(s)	Length
1.	"Release Me"	Agnes, A. Hansson, S. Vaughn, T. Samoy	3:30
2.	"On and On (UK Edit)"	A. Hansson, S. Diamond	3:11
3.	"Love Me Senseless"	A. Hansson, T. Leah	4:40
4.	"I Need You Now (Cahill Edit)"	A. Hansson, S. Vaughn	3:46
5.	"Love Love Love"	A. Hansson	2:59
6.	"How Do You Know"	A. Hansson, R. Shaw	3:50
7.	"You Rain"	A. Hansson, S. Vaughn	4:15
8.	"Secret Love"	3:34
9.	"Sometimes I Forget"	A. Hansson, S. Diamond, Agnes	4:18
10.	"Don't Pull Your Love Out"	A. Hansson, K. DioGuardi	3:15
11.	"Look at Me Now"	A. Hansson, S. Diamond, Agnes	3:56
12.	"Open Up Your Eyes"	A. Hansson, S. Diamond, Agnes	3:37
13.	"Big Blue Wall (Moonwalker remix)"	A. Hansson, S. Vaughn	3:16
14.	"Release Me (Acoustic Version P3 Live Session) (Bonus Track)"	A. Hansson, S. Vaughn, Agnes	3:48
15.	"I Need You Now (Original Version) (Bonus Track)"	A. Hansson, S. Vaughn	3:46
16.	"On and On (Acoustic Version) (Bonus Track)"	A. Hansson, S. Diamond	2:42
17.	"Release Me (DJ Rebel Edit) (Bonus Track)"	A. Hansson, S. Vaughn, Agnes	3:46
18.	"I Need You Now (Video) (iTunes Exclusive Bonus Track)"		3:46
19.	"Release Me (Video) (iTunes Exclusive Bonus Track)"		3:46

Love Love Love Edition
No.	Title	Writer(s)	Length
11.	"Love Love Love"	A. Hansson	2:59
12.	"Love Love Love (Extended version)"	A. Hansson	5:00
13.	"On and On (Anotha Ding-an Be-an Version)"	A. Hansson, S. Diamond	6:19
14.	"On and On (The Void remix)"	A. Hansson, S. Diamond	3:52
15.	"On and On (Acoustic version)"	A. Hansson, S. Diamond	2:42
16.	"Release Me (Pio Radio Remix)"	A. Hansson, S. Vaughn, Agnes	3:39
17.	"Release Me (Acoustic Version, P3 Live Session)"	Agnes, A. Hansson, S. Vaughn	3:48
18.	"On and On (music video)"
19.	"Release me (music video)"
Total length:			67:23

International Limited Edition
No.	Title	Writer(s)	Length
1.	"Release Me"	A. Carlsson, A. Hansson, S. Vaughn	4:15
2.	"I Need You Now (Moonwalker Remix)"	A. Hansson, S. Vaughn	3:00
3.	"On and On (Moonwalker Remix)"	A. Hansson, S. Diamond	4:07
4.	"Secret Love"	A. Hansson, S. Vaughn	3:35
5.	"Sometimes I Forget"	A. Hansson, S. Diamond, A.Carlsson	4:17
6.	"You Rain"	A. Hansson, S. Vaughn	4:15
7.	"Big Blue Wall (Moonwalker Remix)"	A. Hansson, S. Vaughn	3:16
8.	"Love Love Love"	A. Hansson	2:59
9.	"How Do You Know"	A. Hansson, R. Shaw	3:49
10.	"Love Me Senseless"	A. Hansson, T. Leah	4:40
Total length:			39:02

=== Bonus tracks ===
Belgian bonus tracks
No.	Title	Writer(s)	Length
11.	"Release Me (Robert Abagail remix)"	Agnes, A. Hansson, S. Vaughn	3:40
12.	"Release Me (Nils Van Zandt Radio remix)"	A. Hansson, S. Vaughn, Agnes	4:30
13.	"Release Me (DJ Rebel Radio Edit)"	Agnes, A. Hansson, S. Vaughn	3:45
Total length:			11:55

Danish bonus tracks
No.	Title	Writer(s)	Length
11.	"On and On (DK Radio Edit)"	A. Hansson, S. Diamond	3:40
12.	"Love Love Love"	A. Hansson	2:59
13.	"Release Me (Pio Radio Remix)"	Agnes, A. Hansson, S. Vaughn	3:45
Total length:			10:24

== Personnel ==
- Vocals: Agnes Carlsson
- Executive Producer: Anders Hansson
- Producers: Anders Hansson, Felix Persson, Marta Grauers
- Mixer: Ronny Lahti
- Mastered by: Erik Broheden
- Keyboards: Anders Hansson, Felix Persson, Marta Grauers
- Strings: Erik Arvinder, Anders Hansson, Erik Arvinder
- Violin: Erik Arvinder, Josef Cabrales-Alin, Andreas Forsman, Anders Hjortvall, Anna Larsson, Daniel Migdal, Andrej Power, Aleksander Satterstrom, Fredrik Syberg
- Viola: Olof Ander, Erik Holm, Anders Noren, Christopher Ohman
- Cello: Gudmund Ingvall, Cecilia Linne, Henrik Soderquist, Erik Wahlgren
- Doublebass: Danijel Petrovic
- Guitar: Staffan Astner, Anders Hansson
- Backing Vocals: Agnes Carlsson, Britta Bergstrom, Jeanette Olsson, Martin Rolinski, Anders Hansson
- Album covers design: Ricky Tillblad/Zion Graphics
- Album Photography: Waldemar Hansson
- Album Photography [UK & Dutch Release]: Linda Alfvegren

== Charts ==
=== Weekly charts ===
Chart (2008–2010)	Peak position
Austrian Albums (Ö3 Austria)	70
French Albums (SNEP)	38
German Albums (Offizielle Top 100)	69
Swedish Albums (Sverigetopplistan)	5
Swiss Albums (Schweizer Hitparade)	45
UK Albums (Official Charts)	112
UK Dance Albums (Official Charts)	13

=== Year-end charts ===
Chart (2008)	Position
Swedish Albums (Sverigetopplistan)	83

== Release history ==
Region	Date	Label	Format	Catalogue
Sweden	29 October 2008	Roxy Recordings	CD, digital download	1014692
Sweden	1 April 2009 (Love Love Love Edition)	Roxy Recordings	CD, digital download	1018692
Sweden	21 December 2009 (International Edition)	Roxy Recordings	CD	Promo
Italy	13 March 2009	Planet Records	CD, digital download	8033462902003
Italy	25 September 2009 (New Version)	Planet Records	CD, digital download	8033462902195
Belgium	23 April 2009	BIP Records	CD, digital download	8717578072507
Poland	10 July 2009	Universal Music	CD, digital download	602527133492
Denmark	24 August 2009	Copenhagen Records	CD, digital download	5700771101467
France	7 September 2009	Sony Music/M6	CD, digital download	886975532520
France	18 January 2010 (Edition Collector)	Sony Music/M6	CD, digital download	886976383220
Finland	28 September 2009	NFM/Roxy Recordings	CD, digital download	33435263
Norway	28 September 2009	Bonnier Amigo	CD, digital download	33435263
Germany	2 October 2009	Warner Music	CD, digital download	5051865617525
Austria	2 October 2009	Warner Music	CD, digital download	5051865617525
Switzerland	2 October 2009	Warner Music	CD, digital download	5051865617525
Hungary	2 October 2009	Warner Music	CD, digital download	5051865617525
Netherlands	13 November 2009	White Villa	CD, digital download	8712944500875
Australia/New Zealand	9 April 2010	Warner Music	Digital download	5186589532
Australia/New Zealand	12 April 2010	Warner Music	CD	5186589532
United Kingdom	24 May 2010	3 Beat, All Around the World	CD, digital download	2727926
