= Release Me (Agnes song) =

2008 single by Agnes Carlsson

Single by Agnes

from the album Dance Love Pop
- Released: 28 November 2008
- Recorded: 2008
- Genre: Europop; dance-pop; disco; eurodance
- Length: 4:15
- Label: Roxy
- Songwriters: Agnes, Anders Hansson, Sharon Vaughn
- Producers: Anders Hansson, Felix Persson, Märta Grauers

Agnes singles chronology
"On and On" (2008)	"Release Me" (2008)	"Love Love Love" (2009)

Audio sample
- file; help

Music videos
- "Release Me" on YouTube; "Release Me" (US Edition) on YouTube

"Release Me" is a dance-pop song recorded by Swedish singer Agnes Carlsson taken from her third studio album, Dance Love Pop (2008). The track was written by Carlsson, Anders Hansson and Sharon Vaughn. It was released as the album's second single in Sweden and as Agnes's debut single internationally. "Release Me" was another top ten hit for Agnes in Sweden and also charted in Belgium, Denmark, Ireland, the Netherlands and the United Kingdom.

In July 2010, "Release Me" was released outside of Europe for the first time, in Australia, on Warner Music. The song was also released in the United States on 18 August 2009 where it hit number 1 on the Billboard Hot Dance Club Songs chart. To date, the song has sold over 4 million copies worldwide, becoming the biggest hit of her career and is also the best-selling single of all time by a Swedish female solo artist.

== Critical reception ==
Fraser McAlpine of the BBC's Chart Blog said: "73% of why this is a great song rests with those amazing swooping harmonies. That's not to take anything away from Agnes's vocal talents, it's just her honeyed-rasp, set to a synth-disco backing, is not THAT startlingly new a sound."

Nick Levine of Digital Spy described "Release Me" as "far classier" than other Europop songs performed by contemporaries such as September and Velvet. Levine compared Agnes's vocals to that of Leona Lewis and also praised the production, writing: "the all-conquering chorus and thumping beats are present and correct, but this has lashings of strings and lavish production flourishes too."

== Chart performance ==
"Release Me" was released to radio stations and as a digital download in Sweden on 24 November 2008. and entered the Swedish Singles Chart at number 60 based solely on digital downloads and slowly climbed the chart and peaked at number 9. The song made its international debut on the Danish Singles Chart on 27 February 2009 at number 39 and peaked at number 6. It debuted on the Flanders Ultratop 50 chart on 11 April 2009 at number 47 and peaked at number 7, in Wallonia the song debuted in the Ultratop 50 chart at number 33 and peaked at number 6.

The single was released in the United Kingdom in May 2009, where it became a massive hit for Agnes. It debuted and peaked number 3 on the UK Singles Chart. It also peaked within the Top 10 in Ireland.

During the summer of 2009 "Release Me" was able to reach many charts all over Europe; in Norway it entered the chart at thirteen and one week later it peaked at seven. In the Slovak and Slovenian Singles Chart it peaked at seven and two respectively. After a few weeks on the French download charts and music video charts, "Release Me" finally entered the Official French Singles Chart at seven in late July. It entered other French charts and became the third most played song on French radio during 2009. The song was also ranked high on a number of airplay charts all over Europe. In 2010, the song was translated to Italian and French by the investment banker/art producer Olivier Doria.

On 27 July 2009, "Release Me" entered the first chart outside of Europe, the Australian Dance Chart at eleven, on the overall ARIA Charts it peaked at No. 26. It has also entered the US Billboard Hot Dance Club Play Chart at 38, and peaked at one. The song was released in 35 countries all over the world.

After twelve weeks on the Swedish Singles Chart in early 2009, "Release Me" left the chart. But on 25 September 2009, the song re-entered at 44 after its appearance in Swedish Idol. Radio stations started to play the 2009 single again, and after Agnes's live performance at the final of Swedish Idol it climbed even higher on the charts. In January 2010, "Release Me" reached number 11 on the official chart, giving the song a total of thirty-one weeks over three years (2008–2010) on the Swedish 60 Top Singles Chart.

== Music videos ==
The music video for "Release Me" premiered on 28 November 2008, the same day that the song was released for sale in Sweden. The video was directed by the swede Anders Rune, who also made the video for Agnes's single On and On that was made for the Swedish, Polish and Dutch market.

The video begins with Agnes laying in front of an orange wall. Then Agnes walks through the streets of Stockholm at night seeing people dancing and preparing for a night out at a club. In the next scene everyone has arrived at the club and they are dancing while Agnes is standing against a wall with a man holding her. Agnes then leaves the club and walks down the street to another club. The next scene shows a bathroom where Agnes is doing her make-up in front of a mirror while two other girls are dancing in the background. These are the main parts of the video, other sequences are shown of people dancing in various places and Agnes singing in front of the orange wall.

The music video had a massive impact in the UK, where it started to spin on radio stations and TV channels already in February 2009, almost four months before the release of the song. The song was also frequently shown in other parts of Europe, with honors like "song of the week" and "artist of the month" to follow.

=== US Edition ===
The music video made for the European market was rejected by the American record company, Geffen/Interscope, and according to director Thomas Kloss she looked far too grown up. Therefore, a new video was shot in Long Beach, Los Angeles in early September. The video was produced by Brett Marx. The new music video premiered one week after the new "On and On" video exclusive on 30 September on Geffen's website and YouTube channel. The U.S video starts off with Agnes standing in the studio recording "Release Me" and for a few seconds you hear the a cappella version of the song, when suddenly she rushes out the door and, together with her friends, walks to a club. The set-up and structure of the video is similar to the original one, and a major part of the video takes place in the club dancing.

== Live performances ==
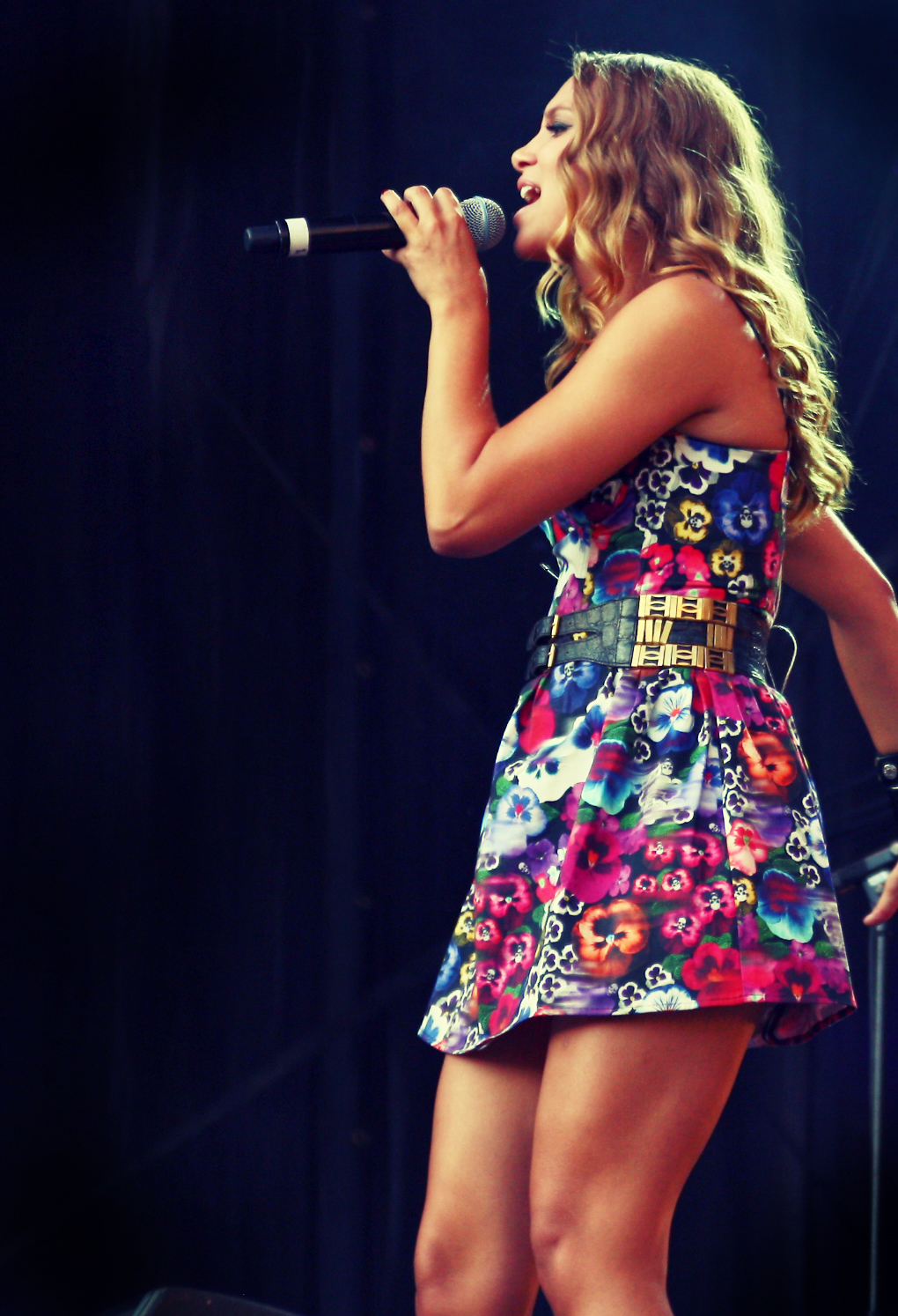
Agnes performing at Rix FM festival in Sweden

Agnes performed "Release Me" live in the UK on morning TV show GMTV on 10 June 2009. On 5 July Agnes performed "Release Me" at the Dutch musicevent TMF Awards. The day after on 6 July she performed the same song in Sweden in the sing-along show Lotta på Liseberg, broadcast by TV4. One week later she returned to Gothenburg for the Gothia Cup Opening Ceremony, where she performed the song on Ullevi, the largest venue in northern Europe.

Later in July she headed back to the UK for another two performances, the first one was at the "Party in the Park" on 25 July in Leeds, where she performed among other stars such as Alesha Dixon and Pixie Lott. The next day she performed both "Release Me" and "On and On" at Nightingales in Birmingham. On 8 August Agnes performed the song in the Polish music competition "Sopot Hit Festival".

Agnes performed in the U.S for the first time in the morning show Good Day New York. On 11 December 2009, Agnes visited the Swedish Idol 2009-final to perform her single "Release Me", which was released in Sweden almost a year earlier.

During the spring of 2010 Agnes went to the U.S to start promote the single, which led to numerous performances on TV-shows and concerts all over America. Among others she performed at "White Party" in Palm Springs on Sunday 11 April, where Britney Spears wrote on her Twitter that she was on her way to check out Agnes.

Agnes performed "Release Me" at the 3rd annual NewNowNext Awards aired on 17 June 2010 in Los Angeles on Logo. On 16 May 2013, Agnes performed the song during the interval of the second semi-final of Eurovision Song Contest 2013.

== Track listings ==
Digital Download (Scandinavian release) (Released: 28 November 2008) (Roxy Recordings)

1. "Release Me" [Radio Edit] — 3:41

CD-single/Digital Download (Belgian release) (Released: 9 March 2009) (Bip Bip Club)

1. "Release Me" [Radio Edit] — 3:41
2. "Release Me" [DJ Rebel remix] — 7:16
3. "Release Me" [Nils Van Zandt Remix] — 7:35
4. "Release Me" [Robert Abigail remix] — 3:38

CD-single (Dutch release) (Released: 22 May 2009) (White Villa)

1. "Release Me" [Radio Edit] — 3:41
2. "Release Me" [Album Version] — 4:15
3. "Release Me" [Nils Van Zandt Remix] — 4:30
4. "Release Me" [LA Rush Club Mix] — 6:35
5. "Release Me" [Music Video] — 3:38

Digital Download (French release) (Released: 27 May 2009) (Warner/Roxy)

1. "Release Me" [Radio Edit] — 3:41
2. "Réalise (Release Me) " [Radio Edit] — 3:06

CD-single (French release) (Released: 20 July 2009) (Warner/Roxy)

1. "Réalise (Release Me) " [Radio Edit] — 3:06
2. "Release Me" [Original Version] — 4:16
3. "Release Me" [DJ Rebel Radio Remix] — 3:46
4. "Release Me" [Music Video] — 4:16

Digital Download (UK iTunes) (Released: 24 May 2009) (All Around The World)

1. "Release Me" [UK Radio Edit] — 3:05
2. "Release Me" [Cahill Edit] — 3:11
3. "Release Me" [Extended Mix] — 6:02
4. "Release Me" [Cahill Club Mix] — 8:05
5. "Release Me" [Moto Blanco Mix] — 7:53
6. "Release Me" [Frisco mix] — 7:37
7. "Release Me" [Acoustic Version] — 3:05

CD Single (UK release) (Released: 15 June 2009) (All Around The World)

1. "Release Me" [UK Radio Edit] — 3:06
2. "Release Me" [Cahill Radio Edit] — 3:11
3. "Release Me" [Extended Mix] — 6:02

12" Maxi Single (Australian release)

(Released: 31 July 2009) (Warner Music)

- Side A
1. "Release Me" [Extended Version] — 6:02
2. "Release Me" [Kill Phil Remix] — 5:15
- Side B
1. "Release Me" [Moguai Remix] — 8:04
2. "Release Me" [Dirty Disco Remix] — 4:30

Digital Download (Australian release) (Released: 30 July 2009) (Warner Music)

1. "Release Me" - 3:28

The Remixes (Australian release) (Released: 30 October 2009) (Warner Music)

1. "Release Me" [Cahill Club Mix] - 8:05
2. "Release Me" [Moto Blanco Mix] - 7:53
3. "Release Me" [Andy F Remix] - 6:29
4. "Release Me" [Todd Watson Remix] - 6:42
5. "Release Me" [Marco Demark & Dave Manna Remix] - 7:05
6. "Release Me" [DJ Rebel Remix] - 7:18
7. "Release Me" [Nils Van Zandt Remix] - 7:33
8. "Release Me" [Frisco Mix] - 7:37
9. "Release Me" [Extended] - 6:02

12" Maxi Single (Italian release) (Released: 7 August 2009)(Planet)

1. "Release Me" [DJ Rebel Extended Mix] — 7:19
2. "Release Me" [Moto Blanco Mix] — 7:59
3. "Release Me" [Extended Version] — 6:04
4. "Release Me" [Radio Edit] — 4:15

Promo Digital (German release) (Released: 14 August 2009) (Roxy/Warner)

1. "Release Me" — 3:08
2. "Release Me" [Extended Version] — 6:04
3. "Release Me" [Moto Blanco Dub Mix] — 7:38

Maxi Single (German release) (Released: 21 August 2009)(Warner Music)

1. "Release Me" [Radio Version] — 3:05
2. "Release Me" [Acoustic Version] — 4:13
3. "Release Me" [Extended Version] — 6:02
4. "Release Me" [LA Rush Club Remix] — 6:35
5. "Release Me" [Kill Phil Remix] — 5:15
6. "Release Me" [Moguai Remix] — 8:04
7. "Release Me" [Dirty Disco Youth Remix] — 4:30
8. "Release Me" [Music Video] — 4:11

CD Single (German release) (Released: 21 August 2009) (Warner Music)

1. "Release Me" [Radio Version] — 3:05
2. "Release Me" [Acoustic Version] — 4:13

'Promo Digital Download (U.S. release) (Released: 18 August 2009) (Geffen)

1. "Release Me" [Main Edit] — 4:14

EP (EU release) (Released: 18 October 2009)

1. "Release Me (Realise) " [French Radio Mix] — 4:13
2. "Release Me" [Moguai Remix] — 8:03
3. "Release Me" [Marco Demark & Dave Manna Remix] — 7:05
4. "Release Me" [Moto Blanco Radio Edit] — 3:55
5. "Release Me" [Todd Club Edit] — 6:41
6. "Release Me" [Andy F Megamix] — 6:29
7. "Release Me" [Cahill Radio Edit] — 3:11
8. "Release Me" [Frisco Radio Edit] — 3:53
9. "Release Me" [Moto Blanco Mix] — 7:53
10. "Release Me" [Cahill Club Mix] — 6:51
11. "Release Me" [Cahill Club Mix] — 7:37

EP (EU release) (Released: 19 October 2009)

1. "Release Me" [Extended Mix] — 6:02
2. "Release Me" [SoundFactory Big Room Dub] — 9:02
3. "Release Me" [PIO Radio Remix] — 3:37
4. "Release Me" [Void Remix] — 5:22
5. "Release Me" [SoundFactory Radio Edit] — 4:00
6. "Release Me" [SoundFactory Club RMX Inst] — 10:03
7. "Release Me" [SoundFactory Club RMX] — 10:01
8. "Release Me" [LA Rush Club Remix] — 6:34
9. "Release Me" [LA Rush Radio Remix] — 3:50

Promo Digital Download (U.S. release) (Released: 18 August 2009) (Geffen)

1. "Release Me" [Main Edit] — 4:14

EP (U.S. Release) (Released: 8 December 2009) (Geffen)

1. "Release Me" [Nils Van Zandt Remix] — 7:33
2. "Release Me" [Razor N Guido Remix] — 8:51
3. "Release Me" [Cahill Club Mix] — 8:06

Digital EP (U.S. Release) (Released: 23 March 2010) (Geffen)

1. "Release Me" [Nevins Extended Mix] — 5:49
2. "Release Me" [Stereotypes Mix] — 4:14
3. "Release Me" [Party Remix Feat. LMFAO] — 4:06

== Personnel ==
- Vocals: Agnes
- Backing vocals: Britta Bergström and Agnes
- Written by: Anders Hansson, Sharon Vaughn and Agnes
- Produced by: Anders Hansson
- Strings by: Erik Arvinder
- Mixed by: Ronny Lahi at Hanssonic studios
- Mastered by: Erik Broheden at Masters of Audio
- Photo: Waldemar Hansson

== Charts ==
=== Weekly charts ===
Chart (2009–2010)	Peak position
Australia (ARIA)	26
Australia Dance (ARIA)	6
Austria (Ö3 Austria Top 40)	8
Belgium (Ultratop 50 Flanders)	7
Belgium (Ultratop 50 Wallonia)	6
CIS Airplay (TopHit)	83
Czech Republic Airplay (ČNS IFPI)	4
Denmark (Tracklisten)	6
Europe (European Hot 100)	6
France (SNEP)	7
France Download (SNEP)	11
Germany (GfK)	5
Hungary (Rádiós Top 40)	30
Ireland (IRMA)	10
Israel International Airplay (Media Forest)	3
Italy (FIMI)	9
Netherlands (Dutch Top 40)	13
Netherlands (Single Top 100)	7
Norway (VG-lista)	6
Scottish Singles Sales (Official Charts)	4
Slovakia Airplay (ČNS IFPI)	4
Spain (Promusicae)	26
Spain Airplay (PROMUSICAE)	3
Sweden (Sverigetopplistan)	9
Sweden Download (Sverigetopplistan)	8
Sweden (Trackslistan)	1
Switzerland (Schweizer Hitparade)	5
Turkey (Turkish Singles Chart)	1
UK Singles (Official Charts)	3
UK Dance (Official Charts)	1
US Dance Club Songs (Billboard)	1

Chart (2020)	Peak position
Poland Airplay (ZPAV)	62

=== Year-end charts ===
Chart (2009)	Position
Austria (Ö3 Austria Top 40)	46
Belgium (Ultratop 50 Flanders)	26
Belgium (Ultratop 50 Wallonia)	31
Europe (European Hot 100)	28
France (SNEP)	29
French Digital Songs (SNEP Digital)	39
Germany (Official German Charts)	37
Hungary (Rádiós Top 40)	115
Italy (FIMI)	42
Netherlands (Dutch Top 40)	54
Netherlands (Single Top 100)	39
Sweden (Sverigetopplistan)	41
Switzerland (Schweizer Hitparade)	32
Turkey (Turkish Singles Chart)	14
UK Singles (OCC)	35
US Hot Dance Club Play (Billboard)	14

Chart (2010)	Position
Europe (European Hot 100)	89

== Certifications ==
Region	Certification	Certified units/sales
Denmark (IFPI Danmark)	Platinum	30,000^{^}
Germany (BVMI)	Gold	150,000^{^}
Norway (IFPI Norway)	Platinum	10,000^{*}
United Kingdom (BPI)	Platinum	600,000^{‡}
Summaries
Worldwide	—	4,000,000
^{*} Sales figures based on certification alone.^{^} Shipments figures based on certification alone.^{‡} Sales+streaming figures based on certification alone.
