= Collection (Agnes album) =

Greatest hits album by Agnes
- Released: 27 December 2013
- Recorded: 2005–2013
- Genre: Dance, synthpop, electronic, house
- Length: 60:03
- Label: Roxy/Universal
- Producer: TBA

Agnes chronology
| Veritas (2012) | Collection (2013) | Nothing Can Compare (2019) |

Collection is a greatest hits album by Swedish recording artist Agnes, and was released on 27 December 2013 in Sweden. It includes most of her singles to date, omitting Stranded, Kick Back Relax, All I Want for Christmas Is You, Sometimes I Forget and Life (Diamonds in the Dark).

== Så mycket bättre covers ==
The album included songs which Agnes performed on the Swedish television show Så mycket bättre, that aired during the autumn and winter of 2013 on TV4. The first single released from the album, and also the first cover from the show was "En Sån Karl".

- Day 1: Lill Lindfors' day - "En sån karl"
- Day 2: Bo Sundström's day - "Allt ljus på mig"
- Day 3: Ken Ring's day - "Nu måste vi dra"
- Day 4: Titiyo's day - "Flowers"
- Day 5: Ulf Dageby's day - "Hanna från Arlöv"
- Day 7: Ebbot Lundberg's day - "Instant Repeater"

== Track listing ==
CD (Roxy/Universal: UNI-7332181-052282)
| No. | Title | Writer(s) | Length |
|---|---|---|---|
| 1. | "Instant Repeater" | Ingvar Björn Olsson, Torbjörn Lundberg, Gunnar Fredrik Sandsten, Jan Christian Person, Karl Åke Jerneholm Gustafsson, Carl Martin Hederos | 3:20 |
| 2. | "Nu måste vi dra" | Jesajah Mårskog, Ken Ring Kiprono, Tobias Jimmy Jimson | 3:15 |
| 3. | "Allt ljus på mig" | Bo Sigvard Sundström, Fredrik Johan Dahl, Mats Jörgen Schubert, Michael Lennart Malmgren | 3:53 |
| 4. | "En sån karl (Just Like a Man)" | Leslie Reed, Barry Mason | 3:51 |
| 5. | "Hanna från Arlöv" | Ulf Dageby | 3:56 |
| 6. | "Flowers" | Magnus Frykberg | 3:23 |
| 7. | "Got Me Good (Bassflow Remake)" | A. Carlsson, V. Pontare, M. Lidehäll, M. Nervo, O. Nervo | 3:46 |
| 8. | "All I Want Is You" | A. Carlsson, J. Quant, A. Diaz | 3:21 |
| 9. | "One Last Time" | A. Carlsson, J. Quant, A. Diaz | 3:59 |
| 10. | "Don't Go Breaking My Heart" | A. Carlsson, V. Pontare, M. Lidehäll, M. Nervo, O. Nervo | 3:48 |
| 11. | "When You Tell the World You're Mine" | J. Elofsson, J. Lundvik | 4:08 |
| 12. | "I Need You Now (UK Radio Edit)" | A. Hansson, S. Vaughn | 3:09 |
| 13. | "Release Me (UK Radio Edit)" | A. Hansson, S. Vaughn, A. Carlsson | 3:08 |
| 14. | "Love Love Love" | A. Hansson | 3:02 |
| 15. | "On and On" | A. Hansson, S. Diamond | 3:51 |
| 16. | "Champion (Radio Edit)" | A. Carlsson, C. Richardson, E. Olsson | 3:06 |
| 17. | "Right Here, Right Now (My Heart Belongs to You)" | J. Elofsson, R. Brandén, P. Westerlund | 4:08 |

Digital Edition
| No. | Title | Writer(s) | Producer(s) | Length |
|---|---|---|---|---|
| 14. | "Secret Love" | A. Hansson, S. Vaughn | - | 3:33 |
| 15. | "You Rain" | A. Handson, S. Vaughn | - | 4:15 |
| Total length: | | | | 56:09 |

== Charts ==
| Chart | Peak position |
|---|---|
| Sweden | 4 |

=== Så mycket bättre singles ===
| Title | Peak chart positions | | |
| Title | iTunes Chart (SWE) | Diglistan | Sverigetopplistan |
|---|---|---|---|
| En Sån Karl | 1 | 4 | 10 |
| Allt Ljus På Mig | 1 | 7 | 49 |
| Nu Måste Vi Dra | 1 | 10 | 45 |
| Flowers | 1 | 12 | - |
| Hanna Från Arlöv | 1 | 14 | - |
| Instant repeater '99 | 2 | 3 | 46 |

== Release History ==
| Country | Date | Format | Label |
|---|---|---|---|
| Sweden | 27 December 2013 | CD, Digital download | Roxy/Universal |
