= Raffaëla Paton =

Dutch singer

Raffaëla
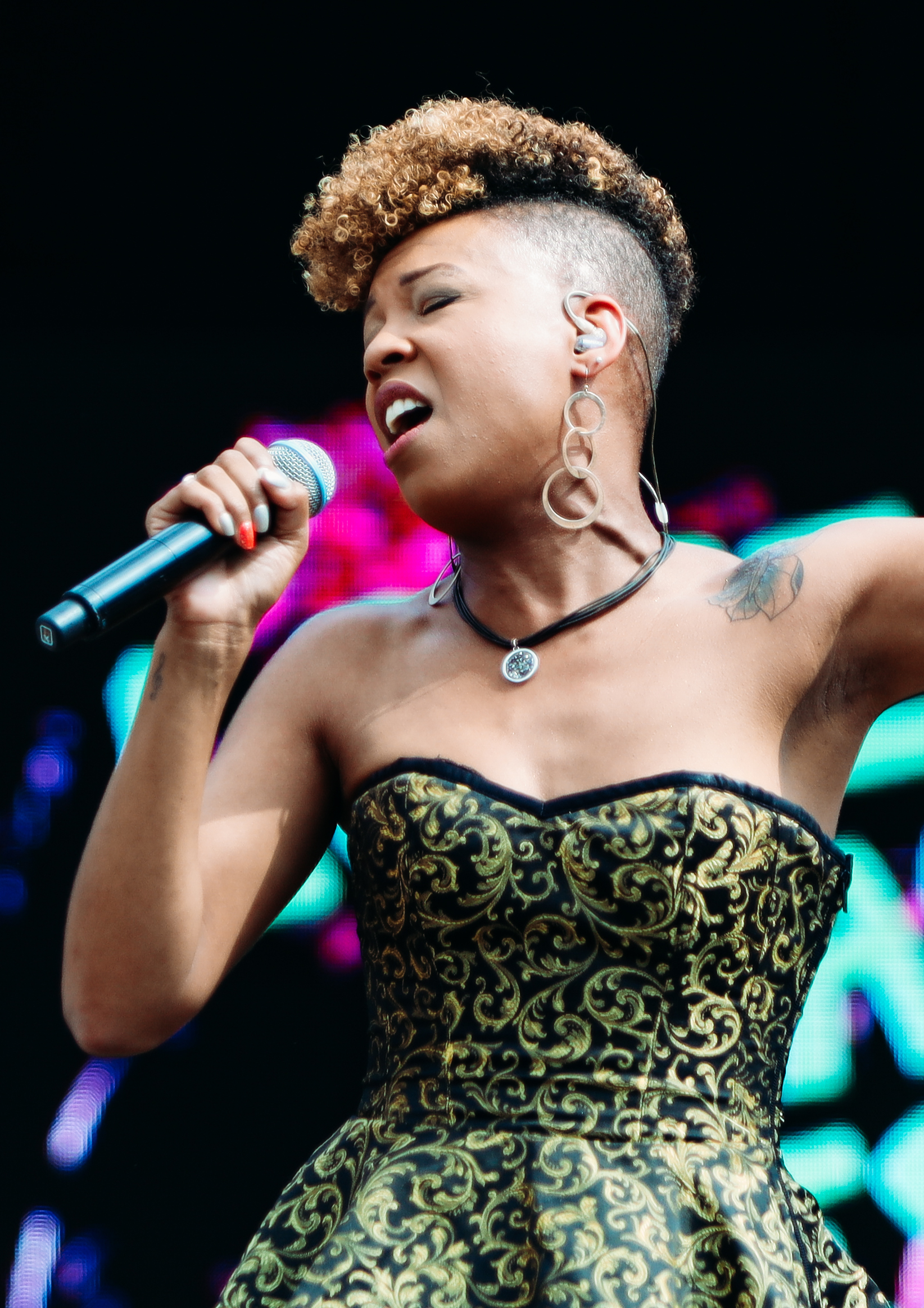
- Raffaëla, in 2019

Background information
- Born: Raffaëla Paton; 1 June 1983 (age 43); Amsterdam, Netherlands
- Genres: Pop, R&B, Dance
- Occupation: Singer
- Years active: 2006–present
- Label: Sony BMG
- Website: Idol Raffaëla (in Dutch); Raffaëla music (in Dutch)

Raffaëla Paton (born 1 June 1983) is a Dutch singer of Surinamese descent and the winner of the 2006 Dutch talent show Idols. Paton participated in the Netherlands national selection for the Eurovision Song Contest 2012 in Baku, Azerbaijan with her entry Chocolatte but did not win.

== Biography ==
Paton moved to Assen when she was a little girl. Her mother was a famous singer in Suriname. Paton's aunt is Ruth Jacott, also a famous Dutch singer who represented the Netherlands in the Eurovision Song Contest of 1993. Before she participated in Idols, she worked as a hostess in a restaurant in Emmen.

On 11 March 2006, was a big day for Paton; The grand finale of "Idol 2006", the Dutch adaption of the hit reality TV show Pop Idol. Paton won Idols with 58% of the total votes, beating favourite Floortje Smit. After the show, RTL 4, the broadcaster of Idols, reported that Floortje was winning the contest, until Paton sang "Right Here, Right Now (My Heart Belongs to You)", which was going to be the debut single of the winner of Idols. The song is a cover of Agnes Carlsson, the Swedish Pop Idol.

On 21 April 2006, Paton's debut album Raffaëla was released. The album contains 12 songs she sang during her Idols career and two new songs about pregnancy. The album debuted at #1 in the Dutch Album Top 100.

On 24 August 2006,?Paton delivered her first daughter, named Beautiful Hope.

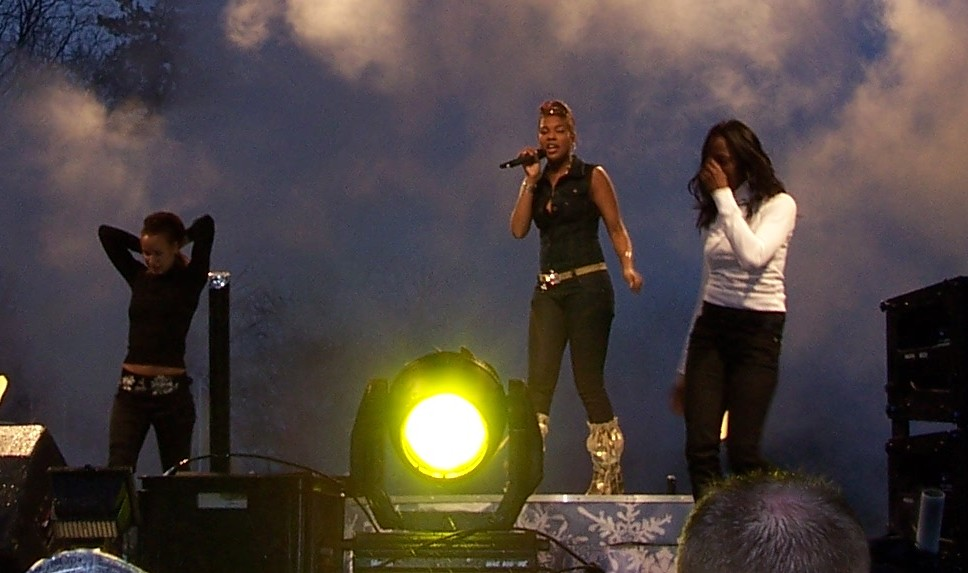
Paton during the Idol series

=== Performances on Idols III ===
- Audition: India.Arie - Beautiful Surprise
- Theater (trio rounds): Patti LaBelle - Lady Marmalade (trio)
- Theater (duo rounds): Eternal & Bebe Winans - I Wanna Be the Only One
- Theater (solo rounds): Alicia Keys – If I Ain't Got You
- Workshops: The Trammps - Disco Inferno
- 1st Liveshow: Lionel Richie - All Night Long (All Night)
- 2nd Liveshow: Ilse DeLange - I'm Not So Tough
- 3rd Liveshow: Mary Wells - My Guy
- 4th Liveshow: Alannah Myles - Black Velvet
- 5th Liveshow: Blu Cantrell - Hit 'em Up Style
- 6th Liveshow: L.T.D. - Back in Love Again
- 7th Liveshow:

1. Roger Glover & Guests - Love is all
2. Mariah Carey - Dreamlover

- 8th Liveshow:

1. Trijntje Oosterhuis & Marco Borsato - Wereld Zonder Jou
2. De Dijk - Ik Kan Het Niet Alleen

- 9th Liveshow:

1. En Vogue - My Lovin' (You're Never Gonna Get It)
2. Nat King Cole - Straighten up and Fly Right

- 10th Liveshow:

1. Aretha Franklin - Think (Freedom)
2. De Poema's - Mijn Houten Hart
3. The Pussycat Dolls - Don't Cha

- Finale:

1. Aretha Franklin & Eurythmics - Sisters Are Doin' It for Themselves (duet with Floortje)
2. The Trammps - Disco Inferno
3. Elvis Presley - Don't Be Cruel
4. Agnes Carlsson - Right Here, Right Now (My Heart Belongs to You)

=== After Idols ===
After a time off to care for her daughter, Paton reappeared as one-third of girlgroup Monroe. Their single "The Real Thing" peaked at #40 on the Dutch Singles Chart, and then dropped again.

After this, Paton decided to prove herself again in the TV smash The Voice of Holland, where she reached the liveshows and became part of the final 24 contestants. She was mentored by Jeroen van der Boom.

=== In The Voice of Holland ===
Paton also auditioned for the inaugural season 1 of the Dutch reality television show The Voice of Holland. In day 3 of the vblind auditions, she sang "Mercy from Duffy with three of the four chairs turning (Jeroen van der Boom, Nick & Simon and Roel van Velzen and she picked to be on Team Jeroen.

In the battle round, Jeroen faced her with Anne Schellekens both singing "Beautiful Liar" and passed to the live shows where she sang "Bad Romance" and was saved by the public vote. In live show 6 she sang "The Way You Make Me Feel" but was eliminated finishing 13th to 16th overall.

== Nationaal Songfestival 2012 ==
Paton participated in the Nationaal Songfestival 2012, the Netherlands national selection for the Eurovision Song Contest 2012 in Baku, Azerbaijan with her entry "Chocolatte".

She lost the duel against Joan Franka with her song "You And Me" who then advanced to the final round and won the right to represent the country. Franka and her have known each other before as they have both participated on The Voice of Holland.

== Discography ==
=== Albums ===
Year	Album	Chart	Peak
2006	Raffaëla	Dutch Mega Album Top 100	1

look at here

=== Singles ===
Year	Single	Chart positions		Album
Year	Single	NL Top 40	NL Singles 100	Album
2006	"Right Here Right Now"	1	1	Raffaëla
2006	"Mijn houten hart" (with Paul de Leeuw)	44	18	Raffaëla
2012	"Chocolatte"		22	TBR
2013	"Ik Hou Van Dit Land"		100	TBR

== Trivia ==
- NVPI, the Dutch certifier, certified the song gold three days after the finale of Idols. The single broke the record for gold ever reached in the Netherlands. At the time, 40.000 copies were the requirement for gold. Paton was given the prize while she was on a popular talkshow called Jensen!, by Eric van Tijn, one of the judges during Idols.
- A week after the final, Sony reported that the single had sold over 80,000 copies, certifying the single platinum.

Preceded by Boris Titulaer	Idols (Netherlands) winner Season 3 (2006)	Succeeded by Nikki Kerkhof
