= Got Me Good =

Got Me Good may refer to:

- "Got Me Good", a 2012 song by Cody Simpson from his debut album Paradise
- "Got Me Good" (Ciara song), a 2012 song by Ciara
- "Got Me Good" (Agnes song), a 2013 song by Agnes
