= The Voice of Holland season 1 =

The Voice of Holland
- Season 1
- Hosted by: Martijn Krabbé; Winston Gerschtanowitz
- Coaches: Jeroen van der Boom; Angela Groothuizen; Nick & Simon; Roel van Velzen
- Winner: Ben Saunders
- Winning coach: Roel van Velzen
- Runner-up: Pearl Josefzoon
- Finals venue: Studio Lukkien in Ede

Release
- Original network: RTL 4
- Original release: 17 September 2010 – 21 January 2011

Season chronology
- Next → Season 2

The Voice of Holland (season 1) was the first season of the Dutch reality singing competition, created by media tycoon John de Mol Jr.. The success of the show resulted in an international franchise called The Voice. It was aired from September 2010, to January 2011, on RTL 4.

One of the important premises of the show is the quality of the singing talent. Four coaches, themselves popular performing artists, train the talents in their group and occasionally perform with them. Talents are selected in blind auditions, where the coaches cannot see, but only hear the auditioner.

The coaches were Jeroen van der Boom, Angela Groothuizen, Nick & Simon (working together) and Roel van Velzen. Martijn Krabbé was the only host in the debut season, Wendy van Dijk came to the live show on. The First Season ended on 21 January 2011, Ben Saunders was declared the winner, with Pearl Jozefzoon as runner-up. Saunders won by 59% of the votes. An average of 2.7 million people watched the show every Friday since its launch, while the final attracted 3,744,000 viewers. The results show broadcast half an hour later attracted 3,238,000. In total 30 of the show's singles reached the Top 100 download charts in the Netherlands, including 2 #1 chart toppers by winner Ben Saunders.

== Summary of competitors ==
Competitors' table
– Winner
– Runner-up
– Third place
– Fourth place
– Eliminated in Liveshows
– Eliminated in Battles

Coaches	Top 57				
Jeroen van der Boom					
Jeroen van der Boom	Leonie Meijer	Anne Hoogendoorn	Meike van der Veer	Raffaëla Paton	Ray Klaassen
Jeroen van der Boom	Kevin Okkema	Robert Oehler	Anne Schellekens	Annelie Reijnders	Jennifer & Anupa
Jeroen van der Boom	Laurens Reij	Paula Leek	Ruben Thurnim	Sanne Diederiks	
Angela Groothuizen					
Angela Groothuizen	Kim de Boer	Shary-An Nivillac	Bart van Overbeek	Nyssina Swerissen	Charlotte ten Brink
Angela Groothuizen	Wiep Laurenssen	David Tapirima	Alma Nieto	Angelo Nannings	Claudia Nelson
Angela Groothuizen	Eva Aouad	Rick & Bob	Sophie Peelen		
Nick & Simon					
Nick & Simon	Pearl Jozefzoon	Jennifer Ewbank	Nigel Brown	Johnny Rosenberg	Shemsi Mushkolaj
Nick & Simon	Davy & Joshua	Billy Maluw	Jacqueline van der Griend	John Willemen	Jort Spanjer
Nick & Simon	Lars Kroos	Leonie & Femke	Myrthe Pijma	Myrthe Ringeling	Saskia Lie Atjam
Roel van Velzen					
Roel van Velzen	Ben Saunders	Esther Nijhove	Lenny Keylard	Sarina Voorn	Joan Franka
Roel van Velzen	Kiki Vermeulen	Laurie Huurdeman	Angela Wasef	Cheyenne den Heijer	Ian Lijkwan
Roel van Velzen	Robert Eussen	Susan Damen	William Finta	Yvette de Bie	Yvette Keijzers

== Elimination chart ==
–	Contestant was in the bottom two and had to sing again in the final showdown
–	Contestant receiving the fewest votes and was eliminated immediately (no final showdown)
–	Contestant does not perform that week

	Week 1 (E09&E10)		Week 2 (E11&12)		Week 3 (E13&14)		Quarter-Final	Semi-Final	Final
TEAM VAN VELZEN
Ben Saunders	Safe		Safe		Safe		Safe	Safe (120%)	Winner
Esther Nijhove	Sing-Off		Saved		Sing-Off		Sing-Off	Eliminated (80%)	Eliminated (Week 8)
Lenny Keylard	Safe		Safe		Safe		Sing-Off	Eliminated (Week 7)	
Joan Franka	Saved		Sing-Off		Sing-Off	Eliminated (week 5)			
Sarina Voorn	Saved		Sing-Off	Eliminated (week 3)					
Kiki Vermeulen	Sing-Off	Eliminated (week 1)							
TEAM NICK&SIMON
Pearl Jozefzoon	Saved		Safe		Safe		Safe	Safe (125.3%)	Runner-up
Jennifer Ewbank	Safe		Safe		Safe		Sing-Off	Eliminated (74.7%)	Eliminated (Week 8)
Nigel Brown	Safe		Sing-Off		Sing-Off		Sing-Off	Eliminated (Week 7)	
Johnny Rosenberg	Saved		Saved		Sing-Off	Eliminated (week 5)			
Shemsi Mushkolaj	Sing-Off		Sing-Off	Eliminated (week 3)					
Davy & Joshua	Sing-Off	Eliminated (week 1)							
TEAM ANGELA
Kim de Boer		Safe		Safe		Safe	Safe	Safe (121.5%)	3rd
Shary-An Nivillac		Saved		Safe		Sing-Off	Sing-Off	Eliminated (78.5%)	Eliminated (Week 8)
Bart van Overbeek		Sing-Off		Saved		Safe	Sing-Off	Eliminated (Week 7)	
Nyssina Swerissen		Saved		Sing-Off		Sing-Off	Eliminated (week 6)		
Charlotte ten Brink		Safe		Sing-Off	Eliminated (week 4)				
Wiep Laurenssen		Sing-Off	Eliminated (week 2)						
TEAM JEROEN
Leonie Meijer		Saved		Safe		Safe	Safe	Safe (148.3%)	4th
Anne Hoogendoorn		Safe		Sing-Off		Safe	Sing-Off	Eliminated (51.7%)	Eliminated (Week 8)
Meike van der Veer		Saved		Saved		Sing-Off	Sing-Off	Eliminated (Week 7)	
Raffaëla Paton		Safe		Safe		Sing-Off	Eliminated (week 6)		
Ray Klaassen		Sing-Off		Sing-Off	Eliminated (week 4)				
Kevin Okkema		Sing-Off	Eliminated (week 2)						

== The Blind Auditions ==
Color key	✔ Coach pressed "I WANT YOU" button	Artist defaulted to a coach's team	Artist elected to pick a coach's team

=== Episode 1 ===
Order	Candidate, age	Song	Coach's and artist's choices			
Order	Candidate, age	Song	Jeroen	Angela	Nick & Simon	Van Velzen
1	David Tapirima, 29	"This Will be (an Everlasting Love)"	—	✔	✔	—
2	Anne Hoogendoorn, 22	"What Do You Want from Me"	✔	—	—	—
3	Pip & Ruud, 27 & 25	"Love You More"	—	—	—	—
4	Johnny Rosenberg, 32	"You Give Me Something"	✔	✔	✔	✔
5	Nathasja Fredriksz, 22	"Bleeding Love"	—	—	—	—
6	Rick & Bob Engeringh, 30 & 30	"Where Did We Go Wrong"	—	✔	—	—
7	Pearl Jozefzoon, 24	"Bleeding Love"	—	—	✔	✔
8	Adam Hoek, 23	"Waiting on the World to Change"	—	—	—	—
9	Claudia Nelson, 39	"For Once In My Life"	—	✔	—	—
10	Ian Lijkwan, 19	"American boy"	—	—	✔	✔
11	Ruben Peeters, 18	"Beggin'"	—	—	—	—
12	Esther Nijhove, 24	"Tell Me 'bout It"	—	✔	✔	✔
13	Jeff van Vliet, 38	"Zij gelooft in mij"	—	—	—	—
14	Ben Saunders, 27	"Use Somebody"	✔	✔	✔	✔
15	Jamie Saunders, 24	"You Are the Sunshine of My Life"	—	—	—	—
16	Jennifer Ewbank, 23	"Easy"	✔	—	✔	✔

- Simon (from Nick and Simon) pushed Jeroen's button during Ben Saunders' audition.

=== Episode 2 ===
Order	Candidate, leeftijd	Song	Coaches and Candidates keuzes			
Order	Candidate, leeftijd	Song	Jeroen	Angela	Nick & Simon	Roel
1	Bart van Overbeek, 22	"Mr. Bojangles"	—	—	—	—
2	Sarina Voorn, 30	"Sober"	✔	✔	✔	✔
3	Angela Wasef, 25	"I Say A Little Prayer"	✔	✔	✔	✔
4	Saniye & Robin, 30 & 32	"Lucky"	—	—	—	—
5	Shary-An Nivillac, 18	"Empire State of Mind (Part II) Broken Down"	—	✔	—	—
6	Kevin Okkema, 24	"Daughters"	✔	—	✔	—
7	Charlotte ten Brink, 22	"Miracle"	✔	✔	✔	✔
8	Shalini Bholasing, 18	"Sweet About Me"	—	—	—	—
9	Shemsi Mushkolaj, 29	"Halfway Gone"	✔	✔	✔	—
10	Mary Pepper, 28	"Rain Down On Me"	—	—	—	—
11	Kim de Boer, 32	"Whataya Want from Me"	✔	✔	✔	✔
12	Ruben Thurnim, 35	"This Ain't Gonna Work"	✔	✔	✔	✔
13	Manon Wierenga, 19	"This Will Be An Everlasting Love"	—	—	—	—
14	Ray Klaassen, 38	"Love You More"	✔	✔	✔	✔

=== Episode 3 ===
Order	Candidate, leeftijd	Song	Coaches and Candidates keuzes			
Order	Candidate, leeftijd	Song	Jeroen	Angela	Nick & Simon	Roel
1	Wiep Laurenssen, 20	"Paparazzi"	—	✔	—	✔
2	Davy & Joshua, 20 & 23	"Love You More"	✔	✔	✔	✔
3	John Slingerland, 29	"Alive"	—	—	—	—
4	Leonie & Femke, 24 & 20	"I Say A Little Prayer"	—	—	✔	—
5	Paula Leek, 21	"Hero"	✔	—	—	—
6	Pieter Oppelaar, 56	"Ain't No Sunshine"	—	—	—	—
7	Lars Kroos, 32	"Wrong"	—	—	✔	—
8	John Paton, 29	"Whataya Want from Me"	—	—	—	—
9	Raffaëla Paton, 27	"Mercy"	✔	—	✔	✔
10	Anne Schellekens, 16	"Use Somebody"	✔	—	—	—
11	Robert Eussen, 31	"Plush"	—	✔	—	✔
12	Esme & Dieke, 31 & 36	"Fascination"	—	—	—	—
13	Jacqueline van der Griend, 33	"When You Say Nothing at All"	—	—	✔	✔
14	Yvette de Bie, 31	"Beggin'"	—	✔	—	✔
15	Lenny Ryan Keylard, 23	"No Woman, No Cry"	✔	✔	✔	✔

=== Episode 4 ===
Order	Candidate, leeftijd	Song	Coaches and Candidates keuzes			
Order	Candidate, leeftijd	Song	Jeroen	Angela	Nick & Simon	Roel
1	Billy Maluw, 26	"This Ain't Gonna Work"	—	✔	✔	—
2	Joan Franka, 20	"How You Remind Me"	✔	—	—	✔
3	John Willemen, 27	"Rain Down On Me"	✔	✔	✔	✔
4	Nadia Stolk, 18	"Mr. Bojangles"	—	—	—	—
5	Cheyenne den Heijer, 19	"Use Somebody"	✔	✔	—	✔
6	Hélène Vijver, 45	"Because of You"	—	—	—	—
7	Myrte Pijma, 23	"Vlieg Met Me Mee (Het Avontuur)"	—	—	✔	—
8	Alma Nieto, 35	"Lost"	✔	✔	✔	—
9	Annelie Reijnders, 26	"Bad Day"	✔	—	—	—
10	Myrthe Ringeling, 21	"Paparazzi"	—	—	✔	—
11	Henk Bongers, 22	"Bend And Break"	—	—	—	—
12	Romy Ouwerkerk, 19	"Sober"	—	—	—	—
13	Jennifer & Anupa Bhagwadin, 32 & 28	"When Love Takes Over"	✔	—	—	—
14	Marlon Gerungan, 54	"For Once In My Life"	—	—	—	—
15	Eva Aouad, 27	"Ain't No Sunshine"	✔	✔	✔	✔

=== Episode 5 ===
Order	Candidate, leeftijd	Song	Coaches and Candidates keuzes			
Order	Candidate, leeftijd	Song	Jeroen	Angela	Nick & Simon	Roel
1	Leonie Meijer, 24	"Mercy"	✔	—	✔	—
2	William Finta, 32	"Eén Wereld"	✔	—	—	✔
3	Fabiola Chin-a-Loi, 30	"A Night Like This"	—	—	—	—
4	Laurie Huurdeman, 20	"Whataya Want from Me"	—	—	—	✔
5	Laurens Reij, 41	"Love You More"	✔	—	—	—
6	Monique Timmermans, 27	"Tell Me 'bout It"	—	—	—	—
7	Nyssina Swerissen, 21	"I Say A Little Prayer"	—	✔	✔	✔
8	Susan Damen, 32	"Sober"	—	—	—	✔
9	Sophie Peelen, 27	"Make You Feel My Love"	—	✔	✔	—
10	Esther Klören, 33	"Because of You"	—	—	—	—
11	Yvette Keijzers, 36	"Love Song"	—	—	—	✔
12	Robert Oehlers, 40	"Rain Down On Me"	✔	—	—	—
13	Esmée de la Bretonière, 37	"For Once In My Life"	—	—	—	—
14	Meike van der Veer, 25	"Lost"	✔	✔	✔	—

=== Wildcard ===
Order	Candidate, leeftijd	Song	Coaches and Candidates keuzes			
Order	Candidate, leeftijd	Song	Jeroen	Angela	Nick & Simon	Roel
1	Bart van Overbeek, 23	"Rain Down On Me"	—	✔	—	—
2	Kiki Vermeulen, 25	"Bleeding Love"	✔		—	✔
3	Nigel Brown, 26	"For Once In My Life"	—		✔	
4	Sanne Diederiks, 31	"I Say A Little Prayer"	✔			
5	Patty Gaddum, 30	"Sober"	—			

== The Battle ==
=== Advisors ===
Jeroen van der Boom	Angela Groothuizen	Nick & Simon	Roel van Velzen
Toon	Patty Zomer	Gordon Groothedde	Kees Taal
Han Kooreneef	Sven Figee	Marcel Fisser	Holger Schwedt

– Battle Winner

Week/Order	Coach	Candidate	Candidate	
1.1	Jeroen van der Boom	Annelie Reijnders	Ray Klaassen	"One"
1.2	Nick & Simon	Davy & Joshua	Leonie & Femke	"More Than Words"
1.3	Angela Groothuizen	Claudia Nelson	Nyssina Swerissen	"Lady Marmelade"
1.4	Roel van Velzen	Joan Franka	Yvette de Bie	"One Of Us"
1.5	Jeroen van der Boom	Kevin Okkema	Laurens Reij	"Stay Away From Heaven"
1.6	Angela Groothuizen	Wiep Laurenssen	Eva Aouad	"You Oughta Know"
1.7	Roel van Velzen	Yvette Keijzers	Ben Saunders	"Drops of Jupiter (Tell Me)"
1.8	Nick & Simon	Jacqueline van der Griend	Pearl Jozefzoon	"Big Girls Don't Cry"
1.9	Roel van Velzen	Susan Damen	Esther Nijhove	"Fighter"
1.9	Roel van Velzen	Ian Lijkwan	Esther Nijhove	"Fighter"
2.1	Nick & Simon	Shemsi Mushkolaj	Myrthe Ringeling	"Hurt"
2.2	Angela Groothuizen	Rick & Bob	David Tapirima	"Holiday in Spain"
2.3	Jeroen van der Boom	Ruben Thurnim	Robert Oehlers	"Purple Rain"
2.4	Roel van Velzen	Cheyenne den Heijer	Sarina Voorn	"Since U Been Gone"
2.5	Roel van Velzen	Kiki Vermeulen	Robert Eussen	"I Don't Want To Miss A Thing"
2.6	Nick & Simon	Myrthe Pijma	Jennifer Ewbank	"I'm In Love"
2.7	Angela Groothuizen	Sophie Peelen	Kim de Boer	"Chasing Pavements"
2.8	Jeroen van der Boom	Raffaëla Paton	Anne Schellekens	"Beautiful Liar"
2.9	Nick & Simon	John Willemen	Johnny Rosenberg	"You Make It Real"
2.9	Nick & Simon	Lars Kroos	Johnny Rosenberg	"You Make It Real"
3.1	Jeroen van der Boom	Jennifer & Anupa Bhagwadin	Anne Hogendoorn	"Three Days in a Row"
3.2	Nick & Simon	Jort Spanjer	Billy Maluw	"Waiting On The World To Change"
3.3	Roel van Velzen	Laurie Huurdeman	Angela Wasef	"Good God"
3.4	Angela Groothuizen	Bart van Overbeek	Angelo Nannings	"Viva La Vida"
3.5	Jeroen van der Boom	Sanne Diederiks	Meike van der Veer	"Release Me"
3.6	Nick & Simon	Saskia Lie Atjam	Nigel Brown	"Flip You"
3.7	Roel van Velzen	William Finta	Lenny Keylard	"Every Breath You Take"
3.8	Jeroen van der Boom	Paula Leek	Leonie Meijer	"What's Up"
3.9	Angela Groothuizen	Charlotte ten Brink	Alma Nieto	"Fallin'"
3.9	Angela Groothuizen	Shary-An Nivillac	Alma Nieto	"Fallin'"

=== The Sing Off ===
Sing Off	Coach	Candidate	Song
Sing Off 1	Nick & Simon	Billy Maluw	"This Ain't Gonna Work"
Sing Off 1	Nick & Simon	Jennifer Ewbank	"Easy"
Sing Off 2	Jeroen van der Boom	Robert Oehler	"Rain Down On Me"
Sing Off 2	Jeroen van der Boom	Meike van der Veer	"Lost"
Sing Off 3	Roel van Velzen	Kiki Vermeulen	"Bleeding Love"
Sing Off 3	Roel van Velzen	Laurie Huurdeman	"Whataya Want from Me"
Sing Off 4	Angela Groothuizen	David Tapirima	"This Will be an Everlasting Love"
Sing Off 4	Angela Groothuizen	Wiep Laurenssen	"Paparazzi"

== Live shows ==
=== Live show 1 ===
Competition performances

Order	Coach	Candidate	Song	Result
1	Nick & Simon	Pearl Jozefzoon	"Bad Boys"	Nick & Simons vote
2	Roel van Velzen	Joan Franka	"Foolish Games"	Roel van Velzens vote
3	Nick & Simon	Johnny Rosenberg	"Haven't Met You Yet"	Nick & Simons vote
4	Roel van Velzen	Kiki Vermeulen	"Don't Speak"	Eliminated
5	Nick & Simon	Davy & Joshua	"DJ Got Us Fallin' In Love"	Eliminated
6	Roel van Velzen	Lenny Keylard	"Could You Be Loved"	Public's vote
7	Nick & Simon	Shemsi Mushkolaj	"Tattoo"	The Sing Off
8	Roel van Velzen	Sarina Voorn	"Let's Stay Together"	Roel van Velzens vote
9	Nick & Simon	Nigel Brown	"Closer"	Public's vote
10	Roel van Velzen	Ben Saunders	"In Love with a Girl"	Public's vote
11	Nick & Simon	Jennifer Ewbank	"Imagine"	Public's vote
12	Roel van Velzen	Esther Nijhove	"If I Were a Boy"	The Sing Off

Non-competition performances

Order	Performers	Song
1	Roel van Velzen and his 6 finalists	"Don't Stop Me Now"
2	Simon Keizer and Pearl Jozefzoon	"The Climb"

=== Live show 2 ===
Competition performances

Order	Coach	Candidate	Song	Result
1	Angela Groothuizen	Bart van Overbeek	"When I Get You Alone"	The Sing Off
2	Jeroen van der Boom	Ray Klaassen	"Somewhere Only We Know"	The Sing Off
3	Angela Groothuizen	Kim de Boer	"Cry Me a River"	Public's vote
4	Jeroen van der Boom	Leonie Meijer	"Just Say Yes"	Jeroen van der Booms vote
5	Angela Groothuizen	Wiep Laurenssen	"These Words"	Eliminated
6	Jeroen van der Boom	Anne Hoogendoorn	"Just A Girl"	Public's vote
7	Angela Groothuizen	Shary-An Nivillac	"Just Like A Pill"	Angela Groothuizens vote
8	Jeroen van der Boom	Kevin Okkema	"I Don't Want to Be"	Eliminated
9	Angela Groothuizen	Charlotte ten Brink	"Take A Bow"	Public's vote
10	Jeroen van der Boom	Raffaëla Paton	"Nobody's Wife"	Public's vote
11	Angela Groothuizen	Nyssina Swerissen	"One Day In Your Life"	Angela Groothuizens vote
12	Jeroen van der Boom	Meike van der Veer	"Son Of A Preacher Man"	Jeroen van der Booms vote

Non-competition performances

Order	Performers	Song
1	Angela Groothuizen and her 6 finalisten	"Raise Your Glass"
2	Kane, Raffaëla Paton and Nyssina Swerissen	"Rain Down On Me"

=== Live show 3 ===
Competition performances

Order	Coach	Candidate	Song	Result
1	Nick & Simon	Johnny Rosenberg	"Another Day"	Nick & Simons vote
2	Roel van Velzen	Sarina Voorn	"Hedonism"	Eliminated
3	Nick & Simon	Jennifer Ewbank	"Can't Get You Out of My Head"	Public's vote
4	Roel van Velzen	Joan Franka	"Walking in Memphis"	The Sing Off
5	Nick & Simon	Nigel Brown	"Just the Way You Are"	The Sing Off
6	Roel van Velzen	Lenny Keylard	"Baby Get Higher"	Public's vote
7	Nick & Simon	Shemsi Mushkolaj	"Only Girl (In the World)"	Eliminated
8	Roel van Velzen	Esther Nijhove	"Stop"	Roel van Velzens vote
9	Nick & Simon	Pearl Jozefzoon	"Battlefield"	Public's vote
10	Roel van Velzen	Ben Saunders	"If You Don't Know Me By Now"	Public's vote

Non-competition performances

Order	Performers	Song
1	Marco Borsato, Nigel Brown and Esther Nijhove	"Binnen"
2	Nick Schilder and Jennifer Ewbank	"Ghost In This House"

=== Live show 4 ===
Competition performances

Order	Coach	Candidate	Song	Result
1	Jeroen van der Boom	Anne Hoogendoorn	"Girl"	The Sing Off
2	Angela Groothuizen	Nyssina Swerissen	"Sweet Dreams"	The Sing Off
3	Jeroen van der Boom	Meike van der Veer	"All The Men I Need"	Jeroen van der Booms vote
4	Angela Groothuizen	Bart van Overbeek	"Chasing Cars"	Angela Groothuizens vote
5	Jeroen van der Boom	Leonie Meijer	"Man in the Mirror"	Public's vote
6	Angela Groothuizen	Charlotte ten Brink	"Valerie"	Eliminated
7	Jeroen van der Boom	Raffaëla Paton	"Bad Romance"	Public's vote
8	Angela Groothuizen	Kim de Boer	"Roxanne"	Public's vote
9	Jeroen van der Boom	Ray Klaassen	"You're Beautiful"	Eliminated
10	Angela Groothuizen	Shary-An Nivillac	"Beautiful"	Public's vote

Non-competition performances

Order	Performers	Song
1	Cee Lo Green, Shary-An Nivillac and Charlotte ten Brink	"F**k You!"
2	The Baseballs, Ray Klaassen and Bart van Overbeek	"Umbrella"
3	Jeroen van der Boom, Meike van der Veer, Leonie Meijer and Anne Hoogendoorn	"Werd De Tijd Maar Teruggedraaid"

=== Live show 5 ===
Competition performances

Order	Coach	Candidate	Song	Result
1	Roel van Velzen	Esther Nijhove	"If I Ain't Got You"	The Sing Off
2	Nick & Simon	Johnny Rosenberg	"I Kissed a Girl"	Eliminated
3	Roel van Velzen	Joan Franka	"Promise Me"	Eliminated
4	Nick & Simon	Nigel Brown	"Blow Me Away"	The Sing Off
5	Nick & Simon	Pearl Jozefzoon	"Vision of Love"	Safe
6	Roel van Velzen	Ben Saunders	"When a Man Loves a Woman"	Safe
7	Nick & Simon	Jennifer Ewbank	"What the World Needs Now Is Love"	Safe
8	Roel van Velzen	Lenny Keylard	"Stand By Me"	Safe

Non-competition performances

Order	Performers	Song
1	Alain Clark and Ben Saunders	"Dancing In The Street"
2	James Blunt and Johnny Rosenberg	"You're Beautiful"
3	VanVelzen, Joan Franka and Esther Nijhove	"Take Me In"
4	Nick & Simon and their 4 finalisten	"Vlinders"

=== Live show 6 ===
Competition performances

Order	Coach	Candidate	Song	Result
1	Jeroen van der Boom	Leonie Meijer	"Listen To Your Heart"	Safe
2	Angela Groothuizen	Nyssina Swerissen	"Hush Hush; Hush Hush"	Eliminated
3	Jeroen van der Boom	Raffaëla Paton	"The Way You Make Me Feel"	Eliminated
4	Angela Groothuizen	Bart van Overbeek	"Feel"	Safe
5	Jeroen van der Boom	Meike van der Veer	"Superwoman"	The Sing Off
6	Angela Groothuizen	Shary-An Nivillac	"Killing Me Softly"	The Sing Off
7	Jeroen van der Boom	Anne Hoogendoorn	"Proud Mary"	Safe
8	Angela Groothuizen	Kim de Boer	"Firework"	Safe

Non-competition performances

Order	Performers	Song
1	Anne Hoogendoorn and Kim de Boer	"Mercy"
2	Ilse de Lange and Leonie Meijer	"Miracle"
3	All coaches and the eight finalists	Christmas medley

=== Live show 7 ===
Competition performances

Order	Coach	Candidate	Song	Result
1	Roel van Velzen	Esther Nijhove	"Somebody Else's Guy"	The Sing Off
2	Jeroen van der Boom	Anne Hoogendoorn	"The First Time"	The Sing Off
3	Angela Groothuizen	Bart van Overbeek	"Here Without You"	Eliminated
4	Nick & Simon	Nigel Brown	"Grenade"	Eliminated
5	Jeroen van der Boom	Meike van der Veer	"Ain't No Mountain High"	Eliminated
6	Angela Groothuizen	Shary-An Nivillac	"Ain't Got No"	The Sing Off
7	Nick & Simon	Jennifer Ewbank	"I Can't Make You Love Me"	The Sing Off
8	Roel van Velzen	Ben Saunders	"I Heard It Through The Grapevine"	Safe
9	Jeroen van der Boom	Leonie Meijer	"Just Hold Me"	Safe
10	Nick & Simon	Pearl Jozefzoon	"Mesmerized"	Safe
11	Roel van Velzen	Lenny Keylard	"I Want You Back"	Eliminated
12	Angela Groothuizen	Kim de Boer	"Rolling In The Deep"	Safe

Non-competitieperformance

Order	Performers	Song
1	BLØF, Pearl Jozefzoon and Meike van der Veer	"Hier"

=== Semifinals ===
Competition performances

Order	Coach	Candidate	Type	Song	Result
1	Roel van Velzen	Ester Nijhove; Ben Saunders	Duet Song	"As"	
2	Angela Groothuizen	Shary-An Nivillac	Solo Song	"Survivor"	Eliminated
3	Nick & Simon	Jennifer Ewbank	Solo Song	"Your Song"	Eliminated
4	Angela Groothuizen	Kim de Boer; Shary-An Nivillac	Duet Song	"Chain of Fools"	
5	Jeroen van der Boom	Anne Hoogendoorn	Solo Song	"Don't Let Go (Love)"	Eliminated
6	Nick & Simon	Pearl Jozefzoon	Solo Song	"Halo"	Safe
7	Jeroen van der Boom	Anne Hoogendoorn; Leonie Meijer	Duet Song	"When the Rain Begins to Fall"	
8	Roel van Velzen	Esther Nijhove	Solo Song	"Get Here"	Eliminated
9	Roel van Velzen	Ben Saunders	Solo Song	"Soul Man"	Safe
10	Nick & Simon	Jennifer Ewbank; Pearl Jozefzoon	Duet Song	"I Still Haven't Found What I'm Looking For"	
11	Angela Groothuizen	Kim de Boer	Solo Song	"I Want To Know What Love Is"	Safe
12	Jeroen van der Boom	Leonie Meijer	Solo Song	"There You'll Be"	Safe

Non-competition performances

Order	Performers	Song
1	Final 8	"I Want You To Want Me"

==== Results show ====
Candidate	Coach	Points coach	Points public	Total	Result
Kim de Boer	Angela Groothuizen	52	69,5	121,5	Finalist
Shary-An Nivillac	Angela Groothuizen	48	30,5	78,5	Eliminated
Leonie Meijer	Jeroen van der Boom	65	83,3	148,3	Finalist
Anne Hoogendoorn	Jeroen van der Boom	35	16,7	51,7	Eliminated
Ben Saunders	Roel van Velzen	65	55	120	Finalist
Ester Nijhove	Roel van Velzen	35	45	80	Eliminated
Pearl Jozefzoon	Nick & Simon	66	59,3	125,3	Finalist
Jennifer Ewbank	Nick & Simon	34	40,7	74,7	Eliminated

=== Singles ===
Order	Performers	Song
1	Kim de Boer	"Change"
2	Leonie Meijer	"Lost In Yesterday"
3	Ben Saunders	"Kill For a Broken Heart"
4	Pearl Jozefzoon	"You Must Really Love Me"
5	Ester Nijhove	"Speak Up"
6	Shary-An Nivillac	?
7	Jennifer Ewbank	?
8	Anne Hoogendoorn	?

=== Finals ===
Competition performances

Order	Coach	Candidate	Type	Song	Result
1	Nick & Simon	Pearl Jozefzoon	Solo Song	"Vision Of Love"	Safe
2	Angela Groothuizen	Kim de Boer (met Adele)	Duet Song	"Make You Feel My Love"	
3	Roel van Velzen	Ben Saunders	Solo Song	"If You Don't Know Me By Now"	Safe
4	Jeroen van der Boom	Leonie Meijer (met Marco Borsato)	Duet Song	"Ik Leef Niet Meer Voor Jou"	
5	Angela Groothuizen	Kim de Boer	Solo Song	"Roxanne"	Safe
6	Nick & Simon	Pearl Jozefzoon (met Trijntje Oosterhuis)	Duet Song	"Ain't Nothing Like The Real Thing"	
7	Jeroen van der Boom	Leonie Meijer	Solo song	"Man in the Mirror"	Eliminated
8	Roel van Velzen	Ben Saunders (met Duffy)	Duet Song	"Warwick Avenue"	

Non-competition performances

Order	Performers	Song
1	Leonie Meijer and Ben Saunders	"Baby When You're Gone"
2	Pearl Jozefzoon and Kim de Boer	"You're A Friend Of Mine"

==== Results show ====
Order	Performers	Song	Percentage	Result
1	Leonie Meijer	"Lost In Yesterday"	15	Fourth
2	Kim de Boer	"Change"	29	Third
3	Pearl Jozefzoon	"You Must Really Love Me"	41	Runner-Up
4	Ben Saunders	"Kill For a Broken Heart"	59	Winner

=== Celebrity performances ===
Week	Performer	Song	Show
1	The Script	"For The First Time	Results show
2	Kane feat. Ilse DeLange	"High Places"	Results show
3	Take That	"The Flood"	Live show
3	Marco Borsato	"Waterkant"	Results show
4	Cee Lo Green	"It's OK"	Results show
5	James Blunt	"Stay the Night"	Live show
5	Alain Clark feat. Diane Birch	"Too Soon to End"	Results show
6	Ilse DeLange	"Beautiful Distraction"	Live show
6	Duffy	"Endlessly"	Results show
7	BLØF	"Wijd Open"	Results show
8	Jan Smit	"Niemand zo trots als wij"	Results show
9	Bruno Mars	"Grenade"	Live show
9	Adele	"Rolling in the Deep"	Live show
9	Duffy	"Well, Well, Well"	Results show

== Ratings ==
Episode	Date	Viewers	Place
The Blind Auditions 1	17 September 2010	1.671.000	1
The Blind Auditions 2	24 September 2010	2.295.000	1
The Blind Auditions 3	1 October 2010	2.701.000	1
The Blind Auditions 4	8 October 2010	2.724.000	1
The Blind Auditions 5	15 October 2010	3.010.000	1
The Battles 1	22 October 2010	2.735.000	1
The Battles 2	29 October 2010	2.922.000	1
The Battles 3	5 November 2010	2.904.000	1
The Sing Off	5 November 2010	2.650.000	2
Live 1	12 November 2010	2.959.000	1
Live 1: The Result	12 November 2010	1.893.000	3
Live 2	19 November 2010	2.699.000	1
Live 2: The Result	19 November 2010	1.725.000	4
Live 3	26 November 2010	2.616.000	1
Live 3: The Result	26 November 2010	2.066.000	2
Live 4	3 December 2010	2.823.000	1
Live 4: The Result	3 December 2010	1.940.000	4
Live 5	10 December 2010	2.602.000	1
Live 5: The Result	10 December 2010	2.063.000	2
Live 6	17 December 2010	2.644.000	1
Live 6: The Result	17 December 2010	2.022.000	4
Kwartfinale	7 January 2011	2.732.000	1
Kwartfinale: The Result	7 January 2011	1.979.000	5
The Sing Off	8 January 2011	1.916.000	2
The Semifinals	14 January 2011	2.839.000	1
The Semifinals: The Result	14 January 2011	2.587.000	2
The Finals	21 January 2011	3.818.000	1
The Finals: The Result	21 January 2011	3.300.000	2

=== The Voice: Real Life ===
Episode	Date	Viewers	Place
The Real Life 1	20 oktober 2010	1.040.000	11
The Real Life 2	27 oktober 2010	935.000	17
The Real Life 3	3 November 2010	656.000	23
The Real Life 4	10 November 2010	826.000	14
The Real Life 5	17 November 2010	675.000	20
The Real Life 6	24 November 2010	762.000	19
The Real Life 7	1 December 2010	852.000	15
The Real Life 8	8 December 2010	792.000	21
The Real Life 9	15 December 2010	485.000	-
The Real Life 10	22 December 2010	459.000	-
The Real Life 11	29 December 2010	454.000	-
The Real Life 12	5 januari 2011	878.000	15
The Real Life 13	12 januari 2011	747.000	18
The Real Life 14	19 januari 2011	801.000	15
The Real Life 15	23 januari 2011	584.000	-

=== Ik Ben Saunders ===
Episode	Date	Viewers	Place
Ik Ben Saunders 1	30 januari 2011	660.000	25
Ik Ben Saunders 2	6 February 2011	573.000	16
Ik Ben Saunders 3	13 February 2011	625.000	22
Ik Ben Saunders 4	20 February 2011	568.000	20
Ik Ben Saunders 5	27 February 2011	570.000	25
Ik Ben Saunders 6	6 maart 2011	660.000	15
Ik Ben Saunders 7	13 maart 2011	620.000	-
Ik Ben Saunders 8	20 maart 2011	639.000	18
Ik Ben Saunders 9	27 maart 2011	580.000	14

== See also ==
- The Voice (TV series)
