= Netherlands in the Eurovision Song Contest 2012 =

- Eurovision Song Contest 2012
- Participating broadcaster: Televisie Radio Omroep Stichting (TROS)
- Country: Netherlands
- Selection process: Nationaal Songfestival 2012
- Selection date: 26 February 2012

Competing entry
- Song: "You and Me"
- Artist: Joan Franka
- Songwriters: Joan Franka; Jessica Hogenboom

Placement
- Semi-final result: Failed to qualify (15th)

Participation chronology

The Netherlands was represented at the Eurovision Song Contest 2012 with the song "You and Me", written by Joan Franka and Jessica Hogeboom, and performed by Franka herself. The Dutch participating broadcaster, Televisie Radio Omroep Stichting (TROS), organised the national final Nationaal Songfestival 2012 in order to select its entry for the contest. Six entries competed in the national final on 26 February 2012 where the winner was selected over two rounds of voting. The first round consisted of three duels and the winner of each duel qualified to the second round. In the second round, "You and Me" performed by Joan Franka was selected as the winner following the combination of votes from a five-member jury panel and a public vote.

The Netherlands was drawn to compete in the second semi-final of the Eurovision Song Contest which took place on 24 May 2012. Performing during the show in position 3, "You and Me" was not announced among top 10 entries of the second semi-final and therefore did not qualify to compete in the final. It was later revealed that the Netherlands placed fifteenth out of the 18 participating countries in the semi-final with 35 points.

== Background ==
Prior to the 2012 contest, Televisie Radio Omroep Stichting (TROS) and its predecessor national broadcasters have participated in the Eurovision Song Contest representing the Netherlands fifty-two times since NTS début in 1956. They have won the contest four times: in 1957 with the song "Net als toen" performed by Corry Brokken; in 1959 with the song "'n Beetje" performed by Teddy Scholten; in 1969 as one of four countries to tie for first place with "De troubadour" performed by Lenny Kuhr; and finally in 1975 with "Ding-a-dong" performed by the group Teach-In. Following the introduction of semi-finals for the 2004 contest, the Netherlands had featured in only one final. The Dutch least successful result has been last place, which they have achieved on five occasions, most recently in the second semi-final of the 2011 contest. The Netherlands has also received nul points on two occasions; in 1962 and 1963.

As part of its duties as participating broadcaster, TROS organises the selection of its entry in the Eurovision Song Contest and broadcasts the event in the country. The Dutch broadcaster has used various methods to select its entry in the past, such as the Nationaal Songfestival, a live televised national final to choose the performer, song or both to compete at Eurovision. However, internal selections have also been held on occasion. In 2011, TROS has internally selected the artist for the contest, while Nationaal Songfestival was organised in order to select the song. For 2012, Nationaal Songfestival was continued to select both the artist and song.

== Before Eurovision ==
=== Nationaal Songfestival 2012 ===
Nationaal Songfestival 2012 was the national final developed by TROS that selected its entry for the Eurovision Song Contest 2012. Co-produced by Big Brother and The Voice creator John de Mol, six entries competed in the competition that consisted of a final on 26 February 2012 which took place at the Studio 24 in Hilversum, hosted by Jan Smit. The show was broadcast on Nederland 1 as well as streamed online via the broadcaster's Eurovision Song Contest website songfestival.nl and the official Eurovision Song Contest website eurovision.tv. The national final was a worldwide trending topic on Twitter on that day, and was watched by 2.264 million viewers in the Netherlands with a market share of 30.6%, making it the most watched Nationaal Songfestival since 2001.

==== Format ====
Six entries competed in the national final where the winner was selected over two rounds of voting. In the first round, the six songs competed against each other in three duels and the winner of each duel proceeded to the superfinal based on the combination of votes from public televoting and a five-member expert jury. In the superfinal, the winner was selected as well by the combination of votes from the public and the expert jury. During both rounds, each juror distributed 10 points among the competing songs, while viewers were able to vote via telephone and SMS. An international jury consisting of 100 members from all participating countries at the Eurovision Song Contest 2012 also voted in both rounds, but their votes only acted as an advisory role.

The expert jury panel consisted of:

- Jeroen Nieuwenhuize – radio DJ
- Carlo Boszhard – television personality, singer, impersonator and host
- Stacey Rookhuizen – entrepreneur and presenter
- Ali B – rapper
- Afrojack – DJ

==== Competing entries ====
A submission period was opened by the Dutch broadcaster on 6 July 2011 where artists and composers were able to submit their entries by posting envelopes in a huge suitcase installed at the courtyard of the TROS headquarters until 30 September 2011. Applicants could submit either lyrics, music, the name of an artist, a complete audio production or a combination thereof, and were required to give their reasons for entering into a camera built in the suitcase when posting their envelopes. 491 submissions were received by the broadcaster at the closing of the deadline, and the six selected competing entries were announced during a press conference on 5 January 2012. The selection of the entries for the competition occurred through the decision by a selection commission consisting of Peter Kuipers, John de Mol, Daniël Dekker, André de Raad, Natascha Lammers and Cornald Maas.

Artist	Song	Songwriter(s)
Ivan Peroti	"Take Me As I Am"	Alain Clark, Steve Diamond, Ben Caver
Joan Franka	"You and Me"	Joan Franka, Jessica Hogeboom
Kim de Boer	"Children of the World"	Martijn Schimmer
Pearl Jozefzoon	"We Can Overcome"	Gordon Groothedde, Curtis Richardson
Raffaëla Paton	"Chocolatte"	Jan Rooymans, Chris Silos
Tim Douwsma	"Undercover Lover"	Bruce R.F. Smith, Michel van der Zanden

==== Final ====
The final took place on 26 February 2012. The allocation draw for the duels took place on 19 February 2012 during the RTL 4 programme Life4You. In the first round, six acts competed against each other in three duels and the 50/50 combination of a public televote and the votes of a five-member expert jury determined the winners of each duel that proceeded to the superfinal. The international jury vote in the duels were won by Pearl Jozefzoon, Raffaëla Paton and Ivan Peroti, respectively. In the superfinal, the winner, "You and Me" performed by Joan Franka, was selected by the public and jury vote; "Take Me As I Am" performed by Ivan Peroti was the winner of the international jury vote.

Final – 26 February 2012
Duel	R/O	Artist	Song	Jury	Televote	Total	Result
I	1	Tim Douwsma	"Undercover Lover"	11	20.1	31.1	—N/a
I	2	Pearl Jozefzoon	"We Can Overcome"	39	29.9	68.9	Advanced
II	3	Joan Franka	"You and Me"	26	27.7	53.7	Advanced
II	4	Raffaëla Paton	"Chocolatte"	24	22.3	46.3	—N/a
III	5	Kim de Boer	"Children of the World"	17	31.4	48.4	—N/a
III	6	Ivan Peroti	"Take Me As I Am"	33	18.6	51.6	Advanced

Detailed jury votes
Duel	R/O	Song	J. Nieuwenhuize	C. Boszhard	S. Rookhuizen	Ali B	Afrojack	Total
I	1	"Undercover Lover"	3	2	2	2	2	11
I	2	"We Can Overcome"	7	8	8	8	8	39
II	3	"You and Me"	4	6	6	4	6	26
II	4	"Chocolatte"	6	4	4	6	4	24
III	5	"Children of the World"	2	6	3	3	3	17
III	6	"Take Me As I Am"	8	4	7	7	7	33

Superfinal – 26 February 2012
R/O	Artist	Song	Jury	Televote	Total	Place
1	Pearl Jozefzoon	"We Can Overcome"	19	14.6	33.6	2
2	Joan Franka	"You and Me"	11	26.1	37.1	1
3	Ivan Peroti	"Take Me As I Am"	20	9.3	29.3	3

Detailed jury votes
R/O	Song	J. Nieuwenhuize	C. Boszhard	S. Rookhuizen	Ali B	Afrojack	Total
1	"We Can Overcome"	2	10	3		4	19
2	"You and Me"	3		5		3	11
3	"Take Me As I Am"	5		2	10	3	20

=== Promotion ===
Joan Franka specifically promoted "You and Me" as the Dutch Eurovision entry by taking part in promotional activities in Turkey between 27 and 29 April, including media and television appearances. In addition to international appearances, promotional activities also occurred within the Netherlands where she performed at live events, radio shows and talk shows. On 21 April, Franka performed during the Eurovision in Concert event which was held at the Melkweg venue in Amsterdam and hosted by Ruth Jacott and Cornald Maas.

== At Eurovision ==
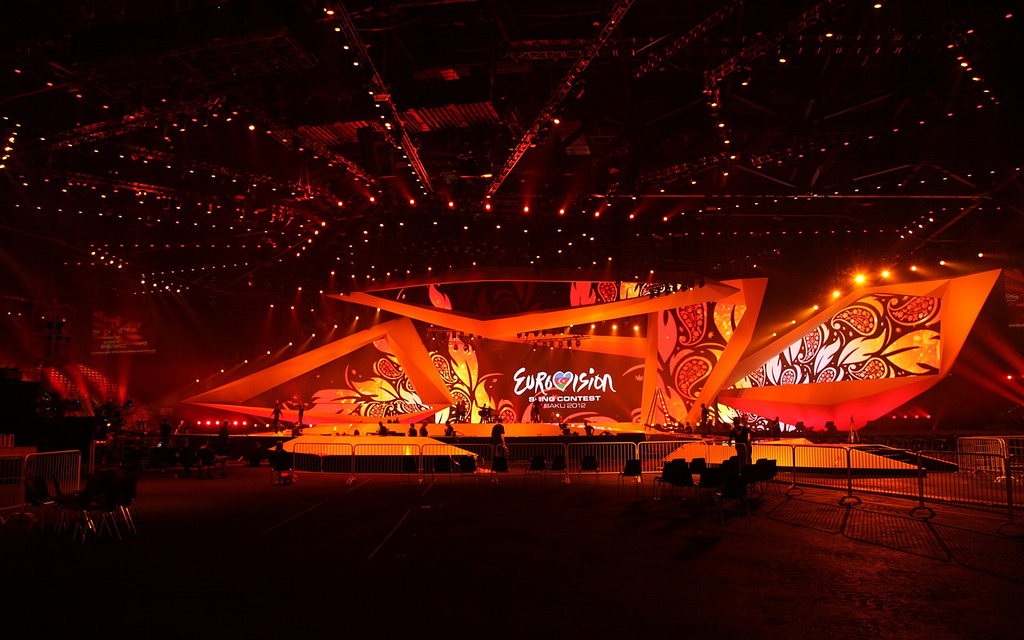
The Eurovision Song Contest 2012 took place at the Baku Crystal Hall in Baku, Azerbaijan.

According to Eurovision rules, all nations with the exceptions of the host country and the "Big Five" (France, Germany, Italy, Spain and the United Kingdom) are required to qualify from one of two semi-finals in order to compete for the final; the top ten countries from each semi-final progress to the final. The European Broadcasting Union (EBU) split up the competing countries into six different pots based on voting patterns from previous contests, with countries with favourable voting histories put into the same pot. On 25 January 2012, a special allocation draw was held which placed each country into one of the two semi-finals, as well as which half of the show they would perform in. The Netherlands was placed into the second semi-final, to be held on 24 May 2012, and was scheduled to perform in the first half of the show. The running order for the semi-finals was decided through another draw on 20 March 2012 and the Netherlands was set to perform in position 3, following the entry from Macedonia and before the entry from Malta.

The two semi-finals and the final was broadcast in the Netherlands on Nederland 1 with commentary by Jan Smit and Daniël Dekker. The Dutch spokesperson, who announced the Dutch votes during the final, was Vivienne van den Assem.

=== Semi-final ===
Joan Franka took part in technical rehearsals on 15 and 18 May, followed by dress rehearsals on 23 and 24 May. This included the jury final where professional juries of each country watched and voted on the competing entries.

The Dutch performance featured a band set-up with Joan Franka wearing a native American headdress and a long azure dress while playing a guitar. The stage colours were predominately orange, red and yellow with the LED screens displaying flames underneath blue streamers that transitioned to a kaleidoscope effect. The performance also featured the use of fire bowl props on stage. Joan Franka was joined by five band performers/backing vocalists: Arjen Rommens, Brendo Festen, Erica Groeneveld, Marc Udo and Rens Damberg.

At the end of the show, the Netherlands was not announced among the top 10 entries in the second semi-final and therefore failed to qualify to compete in the final. It was later revealed that the Netherlands placed fifteenth in the semi-final, receiving a total of 35 points.

=== Voting ===
Voting during the three shows consisted of 50 percent public televoting and 50 percent from a jury deliberation. The jury consisted of five music industry professionals who were citizens of the country they represent. This jury was asked to judge each contestant based on: vocal capacity; the stage performance; the song's composition and originality; and the overall impression by the act. In addition, no member of a national jury could be related in any way to any of the competing acts in such a way that they cannot vote impartially and independently.

Following the release of the full split voting by the EBU after the conclusion of the competition, it was revealed that the Netherlands had placed tenth with the public televote and sixteenth with the jury vote in the second semi-final. In the public vote, the Netherlands scored 51 points, while with the jury vote, the Netherlands scored 31 points.

Below is a breakdown of points awarded to the Netherlands and awarded by the Netherlands in the second semi-final and grand final of the contest. The nation awarded its 12 points to Sweden in the semi-final and the final of the contest.

==== Points awarded to the Netherlands ====
Points awarded to the Netherlands (Semi-final 2)
Score	Country
12 points	
10 points	
8 points	Germany
7 points	Estonia; Turkey
6 points	
5 points	
4 points	United Kingdom
3 points	Lithuania; Norway
2 points	Slovenia
1 point	Sweden

==== Points awarded by the Netherlands ====
Points awarded by the Netherlands (Semi-final 2)
Score	Country
12 points	Sweden
10 points	Serbia
8 points	Estonia
7 points	Turkey
6 points	Portugal
5 points	Bosnia and Herzegovina
4 points	Lithuania
3 points	Norway
2 points	Malta
1 point	Belarus

Points awarded by the Netherlands (Final)
Score	Country
12 points	Sweden
10 points	Serbia
8 points	Turkey
7 points	Estonia
6 points	Spain
5 points	Ireland
4 points	Russia
3 points	Norway
2 points	Germany
1 point	Lithuania
