= Veritas (Agnes album) =

Studio album by Agnes
- Released: 5 September 2012
- Recorded: 2008–2012
- Genre: Electro, disco
- Length: 40:01
- Label: Roxy/Universal
- Producer: Jonas Quant, Fraser T Smith, Magnus Lidehäll, Tony Nilsson, Vincent Pontare, Patrik Berger

Agnes chronology
Dance Love Pop (2008)	Veritas (2012)	Collection (2013)

Singles from Veritas
- 1. "One Last Time" Released: 28 May 2012; 2. "All I Want Is You" Released: 31 August 2012; 3. "Got Me Good" Released: 27 May 2013

Veritas is the fourth studio album by Swedish recording artist Agnes, and was released on 5 September 2012 in Sweden. The album was released worldwide on 1 April 2014, and reached number three in Sweden.

== Background and development ==
The Swedish tabloid Expressen stated that the album was to be released within the first six months of 2011, but was later delayed for a year until "during the spring 2012". The first official single was "Don't Go Breaking My Heart" which premiered on 5 August 2011 at Mr. Gay Sweden Show. This was later considered an intermediate release and was only featured as a bonus track on the French deluxe edition of the album.

On 28 May 2012, Agnes released the lead single, "One Last Time", unlike her previous singles, this was released in Sweden only. In an interview with "Mix Megapol" Agnes also said that her goal with the fourth album was to be involved with all the songs. Her American record company Interscope wanted her to move to the U.S and record the album there, but Agnes didn't feel "at home" and couldn't find the people that she wanted to work with. Therefore, she decided to go back to Sweden and record her album there.

In early August 2012 a release date was finally confirmed and later on August 14 the title and artwork of the album was officially announced. In a press release from the record company Agnes commented on the album name; "I like how the word 'Veritas' subside, aesthetically how it looks and especially what it stands for. The word fits very well with the whole idea behind this album. I always want to be one hundred percent true to myself in everything I do, and for me, all the work and time with this album has been so much more than just record an album. A lot of questions, both large and small, have come up in my head and it really has been an amazing journey. "

The artwork consists of the photographs, where the one in the background is taken from a photoshoot with Swedish magazine "Nöjesguiden" in December 2011 by photograph Frederick Etoall. The photo was then featured in an article titled "Släpp Agnes fri" (eng: Release Agnes) and also used as the cover of the December issue of the magazine. The idea behind the cover was to radiate a collision between soft and hard. The photographer Frederick Etoall came up with the idea to project a portrait of Agnes on her naked body. When commenting on the cover in an interview with Metro International Agnes said that she was very pleased with the result; "I'm very happy, the lips look almost painted out. I was naked and we projected my face against a wall. It was a hell of a job getting the lips so that they covered her breasts but I had a lot of people there who saw that it was so".

== Composition and influence ==
In an early review by Scandipop, they commented on the song "Into the Sun" and stated that it "straight away stood out as one of our big favourites on 'Veritas'. It's got a chorus that hits you like a truck, and a production that shines through particularly in the verses, which makes you pick yourself up off the floor again." They also homage the fact that Patrik Berger, the writer behind Robyn's monster hit "Dancing on My Own", now has taken an interest for Agnes on this album. The british music blog The Prophet Blog stated that they had underestimated Agnes as some generic pop singer who belong in gay nightclubs and that she deserves more recognition and homage the single "One Last Time". "The producer Quant serves up a cunning surprise on the song]s bridge, fooling you for a split second into thinking a dubstep breakdown is about to take place, right before dropping a thundering drum line that leads into Agnes screaming, her voice distorted and twisted until she sounds like an android dying of a broken heart." Scandipop later refer to the songs on the album to be "A militant electrodisco production".

Agnes has self stated that many of her lyrics are inspired by real life events. "Nothing Else Matters" for example is based on an event that occurred when Agnes was fifteen years old. A relative of hers became seriously ill, and she and her family lived in uncertainty for a while, and the only thing she had on her mind what that nothing else would matter if that person wouldn't get better. It is far from any straightforward love stories Agnes describes on her album. "All I Want Is You" is feverish, and ambiguous, perhaps a declaration of love, but equally a story of obsession. "Watching It Burn" is about the heartbreaking moment when you realize that everything has gone wrong, but you doesn't have the energy to stop the relationship from falling apart. "Got Me Good" is a glimpse into the uniquely human habit of falling in love, or cutter, in someone who does not reciprocate the affection. But there's humor too, "Human Touch" is about the first love, when pesky happy smile refuses to leave his face, and "Like God" is Agnes ironic interpretation of American celebrity worship. When describing the feelings behind the song "Amazing", Agnes described it as "when that little maniac who had been hiding inside finally can take place."

== Critical reception ==
Professional ratings
Review scores
Source	Rating
Aftonbladet	3/5 stars
Nerikes Allehanda	3/5 stars
Gaffa	5/6 stars
Göteborgs-Posten	4/5 stars
Metro	4/5 stars

The album received generally positive reviews from music critics. Joacim Persson of Swedish tabloid Aftonbladet gave the album three out of five and courts Agnes' voice, though he raises a warning finger. "The concern with sweet, wailing, soul singers is that their voices are often so beautiful rippling that nothing stands out. Agnes, one of those 'idol' alumnus who have done something real in their career after Idol, could be such an artist. She has even been sometimes. But "Veritas" is something else. For it is when the plaster cracks on the edge, when Agnes dare to make a mess, that it really starts to happen something with the music. The stylish talented voice, she already has." He continue with calling Agnes' voice sharp and raw and relate that to what is separating anonymous contemporary pop from the excitement. "It exudes confidence and determination. It is 2012, but bottoms in the R & B classic frame that Agnes has made her brand." Camilla Diaz of Gaffa continues on the track that Persson started, she stated that the album has one foot in the eighties and one in the present days. "'Loaded' has a refrain that not only breathes 80s but also sparkles with 00's. Agnes do not apologize for itself, but requires space, requires the listener to stop. Resting the voice in the break between songs, exploding in the choruses." Johan Lindqvist of Göteborgs-Posten continues on the same track. "Many international artists are trying to do just this thing, but does not succeed as well as Agnes. I am impressed by a more or less seamless pop album with one leg in 1987 and the second in 2012 "

Peter Carlsson of Nerikes Allehanda wrote a mixed review stating that the sound of the album is "something of a cross between Robyn and Kylie Minogue." He also thought several songs on the album could find their ways into the charts easily, however felt that the album was lacking a hit like, Release Me.

The Swedish music magazine "Gaffa" salutes the album and Agnes herself. "For those who believe that they've heard everything that Agnes is and can accomplish in the theatrical choruses in One Last Time will be surprised. Maybe especially when the direction changed completely in All I Want Is You, which, with its angry strings and strange non chorus unravels everything you previously knew."

== Singles ==
The first single from the album, "One Last Time", was released on 28 May 2012 and peaked at the official chart in Sweden at 33, and at 1 on the download chart. The single spent the summer within the top ten at the official airplay chart. On 27 August Agnes confirmed her next single, called "All I Want Is You", and revealed the official cover artwork at her official Facebook page. The single is scheduled for release in Sweden on August 31. The track had its first play on radio on August 28. On 10 May 2013, Swedish producer Bassflow tweeted that he had finished the new version of "Got Me Good", implying that the song is the new single from the album.

== Track listing ==
No.	Title	Writer(s)	Producer(s)	Length
1.	"Amazing"	Agnes Carlsson, Ana Diaz, Jonas Quant	Quant	3:47
2.	"Walk out of Here"	Carlsson, Diaz, Quant	Quant	3:58
3.	"All I Want Is You"	Carlsson, Diaz, Quant, Vincent Pontare	Quant	3:21
4.	"One Last Time"	Carlsson, Diaz, Quant	Quant	3:59
5.	"Loaded"	Carlsson, Sharon Vaughn, Tony Nilsson	Nilsson	3:30
6.	"Human Touch"	Carlsson, Pontare, Nilsson	Nilsson	3:49
7.	"Watching It Burn"	Carlsson, Vaughn, Nilsson	Nilsson	3:24
8.	"Got Me Good"	Carlsson, Pontare, Mim Nervo, Liv Nervo, Magnus Lidehäll	Lidehäll, Pontare	3:25
9.	"Like God"	Carlsson, Shereen Shabana, Nilsson	Nilsson	3:49
10.	"Into the Sun"	Carlsson, Patrik Berger, Fredrik Berger	Berger	3:42
11.	"Nothing Else Matters"	Carlsson, Pontare, Vaughn	Pontare	3:17
Total length:				40:01

iTunes bonus track
No.	Title	Writer(s)	Producer(s)	Length
12.	"Unforgiven"	Carlsson, Vaughn, Fraser T Smith	Smith	3:56
Total length:				43:57

Spotify bonus track
No.	Title	Writer(s)	Producer(s)	Length
12.	"Heart Rate"	Carlsson, Trinity	Trinity	3:15
Total length:				43:16

Digital Deluxe Edition
No.	Title	Writer(s)	Producer(s)	Length
12.	"Heart Rate"	Carlsson, Frederik Häggstam, Johan Gustafson, Sebastian Lundberg	Trinity	3:15
13.	"Unforgiven"	Carlsson, Fraser T. Smith, Vaughn	Smith	3:56
Total length:				47:21

Bonus track French edition
No.	Title	Writer(s)	Producer(s)	Length
12.	"Don't Go Breaking My Heart"	Carlsson, Vaughn, Fraser T Smith	Smith	3:50
Total length:				43:57

== Charts ==
=== Weekly charts ===
Chart (2012)	Peak position
Swedish Albums (Sverigetopplistan)	3

=== Year-end charts ===
Chart (2012)	Position
Swedish Albums (Sverigetopplistan)	81
