= Kick Back Relax =

Single by Agnes Carlsson

from the album Stronger
- Released: 7 September 2006
- Recorded: 2006
- Genre: Pop, Dance, Disco
- Length: 2:59
- Label: Sony BMG
- Songwriter(s): Jörgen Elofsson
- Producer(s): Jörgen Elofsson

Agnes Carlsson singles chronology
"Stranded" (2006)	"Kick Back Relax" (2006)	"Champion" (2006)

"Kick Back Relax" is a pop song recorded by Swedish singer and Idol winner Agnes taken from her second album Stronger. The track was written by Jörgen Elofsson who also wrote her debut single "Right Here Right Now". It was released as the album's first single in September 2006.

The song first entered the Swedish chart on 28 September and peaked that same week at two. It stayed on the chart for fourteen weeks.

== Music video ==
A music video was produced to promote the single.

== Track listing ==
Digital Download

(Released: 7 September 2006)

1. "Kick Back Relax" [Radio Edit] — 2:59

CD-single (EAN 0886970182324)

(Released: 20 September 2006)

1. "Kick Back Relax" [Radio Edit] — 2:59
2. "Kick Back Relax" [Instrumental] — 2:59

== Chart performance ==
=== Weekly charts ===
Chart (2006)	Peak position
Sweden (Sverigetopplistan)	2

=== Year-end charts ===
Chart (2006)	Position
Sweden (Sverigetopplistan)	19
