= Mijn houten hart =

"Mijn Houten Hart"

Single by Raffaëla & Paul de Leeuw

from the album Raffaëla
- Released: 9 June 2006
- Recorded: 2006
- Genre: Pop
- Length: 3:23 (Single version); 3:38 (Album version without Paul de Leeuw)
- Label: Sony BMG
- Songwriters: Thomas Acda, Sandro Assorgia
- Producers: Eric van Tijn, Jochem Fluitsma

Raffaëla singles chronology
"Right Here Right Now" (2006)	"Mijn Houten Hart" (2006)

Paul de Leeuw singles chronology
"Duizel mij" (2006)	"Mijn Houten Hart" (2006)	""Une belle histoire / Een mooi verhaal" (with Alderliefste)" (2006)

"Mijn houten hart" (My Wooden Heart) is a song from the Poema's. This article is about the cover by Raffaëla and Paul de Leeuw. It is the second single released from Raffaëla's debut album Raffaëla, released on 9 June 2006. The single version of the song is less successful than her debut single, "Right Here Right Now", which entered almost every Dutch chart at #1, including the official Dutch Top 40.

The single peaked at number eighteen in the Dutch Mega Top 100 Singles Chart. Though Mijn Houten Hart did not enter the Dutch Top 40, it managed to peak at number four in the Dutch Tip Parade, a chart that shows the top 30 tracks that are highly capable of entering the Dutch Top 40. Paul de Leeuw has had over 15 Dutch Top 40-hits, including a number-1-single, two number-2-singles and 2 number-3-singles. For him it was one of his first singles not to enter the Top 40. Mijn Houten Hart is to make part of his new upcoming album Mooi weer een CD.

== Track listing ==
- CD single (Zomba / Sony BMG / 82876 686403 2)
1. "Mijn houten hart" 3:23
2. "Mijn houten hart" [Instrumental] 3:23

== Charts ==
Chart (2006)	Peak position
Dutch Tip Parade	4
Dutch Mega Top 100 Singles	18
