= One Last Time (Agnes song) =

Single by Agnes

from the album Veritas
- Released: May 28, 2012
- Recorded: 2012; Gothenburg, Sweden
- Genre: Synthpop
- Length: 4:00
- Label: Roxy/Universal Music
- Songwriter(s): Agnes, J. Quant, A. Diaz
- Producer(s): Jonas Quant

Agnes singles chronology
| "Sometimes I Forget" (2010) | "One Last Time" (2012) | "All I Want Is You" (2012) |

"One Last Time" is a song by Swedish singer Agnes from her fourth studio album Veritas. It was released as the lead single from the album on May 28, 2012. The song leaked on to Spotify earlier in May but was quickly removed, and on May 22, 2012 Agnes officially confirmed its release on her Facebook fan page. The single became a moderate success in Sweden, selling over 40,000 copies and being certified with platinum. It peaked at 1 at the official download chart and at 33 at the official chart.

== Background ==
According to the Swedish tabloid Expressen, Agnes fourth album was to be released within the first six months of 2011, but has since been delayed for over a year. The first official single was "Don't Go Breaking My Heart" which premiered on August 5, 2011. This was later seen as a promotional single released in Sweden only, and would not serve as the lead single for her fourth studio album. In April 2012 Agnes revealed that she had now chosen which song from her forthcoming album that would be the lead single, though without revealing any details about it. Almost two months later, the single leaked on Spotify, but was later dispersed, just a few days after on May 22, 2012 Agnes officially confirmed the single and release date.

In an interview with Sveriges Radio Agnes said that the inspiration for the song came from a nightmare that she had one night, where she had "fucked up everything" regarding her relationship. She has also stated that "This is the most emotional song I have ever written. When you write a song that means a lot to you, it becomes a part of yourself. Thats the case with "One Last Time." I hope I can touch people with it."

== Critical reception ==
Camilla Gervide of Nyheter24.se writes about the song and questions Agnes' direction with her music. ""'...this is good but if it is Agnes, I do not know. What is Agnes, I wonder if she even knows it herself." She continues by saying that she really likes the song and that she would probably view it in a different way if this had been the first thing she had done, but instead she is confused. The British music blog "Theprophetblog" stated that they had underestimated Agnes as some generic pop singer who belongs in gay nightclubs and that she deserves more recognition. "The producer Quant serves up a cunning surprise on the song’s bridge, fooling you for a split second into thinking a dubstep breakdown is about to take place, right before dropping a thundering drum line that leads into Agnes screaming, her voice distorted and twisted until she sounds like an android dying of a broken heart.."

American blogger Perez Hilton homaged Agnes and the song "One Last Time" on his website, calling the song "heart crushingly sweet" and a "power ballad to the core" while he continues with saluting her vocals and the lyrics. "We are MEGA digging on this Swedish IDOL alum's newest ode to fractured love, One Last Time. Agnes thumps and bumps the base like a heartbeat, her vocals are like liquid gold filling our ears, AND the lyrics are simplistic yet VERY poignant."

== Chart performance ==
On June 10, the song entered the Swedish download chart at six and later peaked at one. It entered the official chart at 33, and peaked at the same spot. In August the song was awarded a gold certification in Sweden from over 20,000 sold copies. It later was certified platinum for more than 40,000 copies sold in Sweden.

== Music video ==
The music video for "One Last Time" was shot on May 17, 2012, in Stockholm, Sweden, and was released on May 30, 2012, on Agnes' official YouTube channel and on Aftonbladet's website. It was directed by Amir Chamdin. The idea behind the video is to describe how it feels when you have wrecked something that means a lot to you. The tears that Agnes shed during the music video were real, in an interview with Sveriges Radio she revealed that she couldn't stop crying during the filming of the video.

=== Synopsis ===
Agnes, here seen crying, in the Music video for "One Last Time".

The music video is in black-and-white and starts with Agnes walking through the woods, and by the beach, and continues with her sitting on the floor; singing. Between the different scenes, Agnes is together with a man who is standing alone with light behind his face, showing only his silhouette. The next scene is Agnes lying on a parking lot together with the man, holding hands. He then leaves, and parking stripes on the ground form a cross, making Agnes depicted as crucified. The video continues with Agnes sitting on the floor again, crying until it ends with the same scene it started with.

== Track listings ==
Digital Download/Streaming

(Released: May 28, 2012) (Roxy/Universal)

1. "One Last Time " — 4:00

The Remixes (Digital Download/Streaming)

(Released: June 27, 2012) (Roxy/Universal)

1. "One Last Time - Remix " — 3:27
2. "One Last Time - Remix Extended " — 3:42

The Remixes 2 (Digital Download/Streaming)

(Released: August 27, 2012) (Roxy/Universal)

1. "One Last Time - Orion Remix " — 6:36
2. "One Last Time - John Dahlbäck Remix " — 5:31

== Charts ==
| Chart (2012) | Peak position |
|---|---|
| Belgium (Ultratop 50 Flanders) | 72 |
| Sweden (Sverigetopplistan) | 33 |
| Swedish Singles Chart (Downloads) | 1 |

== Release history ==
| Region | Date | Format | Label |
|---|---|---|---|
| Sweden | May 28, 2012 | Digital download/streaming & airplay | Roxy/Universal Music |
| Sweden | June 27, 2012 | Remixes (Digital download/streaming) | Roxy/Universal Music |
| Denmark | June, 2012 | Airplay | Copenhagen Records |
| Denmark | June 25, 2012 | Digital download/streaming | Copenhagen Records |
| Finland | August 22, 2012 | Digital download/streaming | Universal Music |
| Belgium | November 19, 2012 | Digital download | BIP Records |
