= Stronger (Agnes album) =

Studio album by Agnes
- Released: 11 October 2006
- Recorded: 2006
- Genre: Pop; R&B
- Length: 38:52
- Label: Ariola
- Producer: Arnthor; Jörgen Elofsson; Ghost; iSHi; Jock-E; Emanuel Olsson; Quiz & Larossi; Fredrik Thomander; Anders Wikström

Agnes chronology
| Agnes (2005) | Stronger (2006) | Dance Love Pop (2008) |

Singles from Stronger
- 1. "Kick Back Relax" Released: 7 September 2006; 2. "Champion" Released: 22 November 2006

Professional ratings
Review scores
| Source | Rating |
|---|---|
| Expressen | 1/5 stars |
| Helsingborgs Dagblad | 3/5 stars |
| Kristianstadsbladet | 3/5 stars |
| Svenska Dagbladet | 2.5/5 stars |

Stronger is the second studio album by Swedish singer Agnes Carlsson, released on 11 October 2006 by Ariola Records. Two songs from the album, "I Believe in You" and "I Had a Feelin'", were covered by German girl group No Angels on their 2007 album Destiny. The song "Love Is All Around" has been covered by artists from at least three other continents. The album topped the charts in Sweden, becoming her second consecutive number one album.

== Reception ==
Markus Larsson of Aftonbladet stated, "Agnes is an obvious talent with a strong voice, but no one seems to know what to make out of it, not the record company, not the songwriters, not the producers, not even Agnes herself."

Nina Sköldqvist of Helsingborgs Dagblad wrote that Stronger contains a variety of genres, including "a heavy ballad" like "(What Do I Do With) All This Love", "spirited R&B" like "Kick Back Relax" and the "MTV-like" "My Boy" and "Everybody".

== Track listing ==
| No. | Title | Writer(s) | Producer(s) | Length |
|---|---|---|---|---|
| 1. | "I Believe in You" | Johan Ekhé; Ulf Lindström | Ghost | 3:31 |
| 2. | "Top of the World" | Arnthor Birgisson; Savan Kotecha; Eshraque Mughal | iSHi; Arnthor^{[a]} | 3:10 |
| 3. | "Somewhere Down the Road" | Tom Snow; Cynthia Weil | Quiz & Larossi | 4:03 |
| 4. | "I Had a Feelin'" | Birgisson; Jörgen Elofsson | Arnthor | 3:16 |
| 5. | "Kick Back Relax" | Elofsson | Ghost; Elofsson^{[a]} | 2:59 |
| 6. | "Champion" | Agnes Carlsson; Curtis A. Richardson; Emanuel Olsson | Olsson | 3:27 |
| 7. | "Love Is All Around" | Fredrik Thomander; Anders Wikström | Thomander; Wikström | 3:23 |
| 8. | "(What Do I Do With) All This Love" | Elofsson; Dan Hill | Ghost | 4:36 |
| 9. | "My Boy" | Carlsson; Ekhé; Lindström | Ghost | 3:19 |
| 10. | "(Baby) I Want You Gone" | Olsson; Richardson; Patrik Magnusson; Johan Ramström | Olsson | 3:36 |
| 11. | "Everybody Knows" | Carlsson; Joakim Björklund; Julie Morrison | Jock-E | 3:20 |
| Total length: | | | | 38:52 |

Notes

- ^{^a} signifies a vocal producer

== Charts ==
=== Weekly charts ===
| Chart (2006) | Peak position |
|---|---|
| European Albums (Billboard) | 62 |
| Swedish Albums (Sverigetopplistan) | 1 |

=== Year-end charts ===
| Chart (2006) | Position |
|---|---|
| Swedish Albums (Sverigetopplistan) | 90 |

== Release history ==
| Region | Date | Format | Label | Ref. |
|---|---|---|---|---|
| Sweden | 11 October 2006 | CD; digital download | Ariola | |
| United States | 8 September 2009 | Digital download | Ariola | |
