= Raffaëla (album) =

Studio album by Raffaëla Paton
- Released: 21 April 2006 (Netherlands)
- Recorded: 2005
- Genre: R&B/Pop
- Label: Sony
- Producer: Eric van Tijn

Singles from Raffaëla
- 1. "Right Here, Right Now"; 2. "Mijn Houten Hart"

Raffaëla is the debut album by the Dutch 2006 Idols winner Raffaëla. The album was released on 21 April 2006 in the Netherlands and contains songs Raffaëla sung during her Idols career. The album also contains two Dutch songs about pregnancy (as Raffaëla was pregnant) and a duet with Floortje Smit, runner-up on Idols. The album debuted at #1 in the Dutch Mega Album Top 100, but quickly dropped out of the top 20.

== Singles information ==
The first single released from the album was Right Here, Right Now (My Heart Belongs to You), covered from Agnes Carlsson, winner of the Swedish Pop Idol. The song was released the day after the Idols final for digital download only. Three days later, Sony BMG had announced that the song was downloaded over 40,000 times, certifying the single gold before its release: the first time something like this happened. A week after the final, the song was certified platinum, meaning over 80,000 copies were downloaded already. On 17 March 2006, the CD single was released, debuting and peaking at the number one position in the Dutch Top 40 (national Dutch chart, similar to the Billboard Hot 100). "Right Here Right Now" remains her most successful single to date. The second single "Mijn Houten Hart", recorded with Paul de Leeuw, flopped commercially. The single was released on 9 June 2006 and received little promotion. A music video was made for the song, showing Raffaëla and De Leeuw recording the song in a studio, but due to Raffaëla's pregnancy she was unable to further promote the song. The song entered the Dutch Mega Top 100 Singles at #63, rose up to #18 the following week and dropped again to #33 in its third week.

== Track listing ==
1. "All Night Long" (Lionel Richie cover)
2. "Right Here, Right Now (My Heart Belongs to You)" (Agnes Carlsson cover)
3. "Beautiful Surprise" (India.Arie cover)
4. "Voor eeuwig en altijd"
5. "Sisters Are Doing It for Themselves" [duet with Floortje - Aretha Franklin & Eurythmics cover]
6. "Mijn Houten Hart" (De Poema's cover)
7. "Think" (Aretha Franklin cover)
8. "If I Ain't Got You" (Alicia Keys cover)
9. "Disco Inferno" (The Trammps cover)
10. "Ik Kan Het Niet Alleen" (De Dijk cover)
11. "Jouw ogen"
12. "Straighten Up and Fly Right" (Big Band Live - Nat King Cole cover - Bonus)
13. "My Lovin' (You're Never Gonna Get It)" (Big Band Live - En Vogue cover - Bonus)
14. "Right Here, Right Now (My Heart Belongs to You)" (Video - Bonus)

Translation from Dutch to English:

- "Voor eeuwig en altijd" (Translation: "Forever and always")
- "Mijn houten hart" (Translation: "My wooden heart")
- "Ik kan het niet alleen" (Translation: "I can't do it alone")
- "Jouw ogen" (Translation: "Your eyes")

== Chart performance ==
Chart performance for Raffaëla
Chart (2006)	Peak position
Dutch Albums (Album Top 100)	1
