= Right Here, Right Now (My Heart Belongs to You) =

2005 song by Jörgen Elofsson

Single by Agnes

from the album Agnes
- Released: December 7, 2005
- Recorded: 2005
- Genre: Pop
- Length: 4:09
- Label: Columbia
- Songwriter(s): Jörgen Elofsson
- Producer(s): Jörgen Elofsson, Rickard Brandén, Per Westerlund

Agnes singles chronology
"Right Here, Right Now (My Heart Belongs to You)" (2005)	"Stranded" (2006)

"Right Here, Right Now (My Heart Belongs to You)" is a song originally written by the Swede Jörgen Elofsson for Idol series in Sweden. It became the lead single for Agnes, the winner of Pop Idol 2005 in Sweden, from her eponymous debut album (2005). The song was later covered by Raffaëla Paton, the winner of Idols 2006 in the Netherlands. Both versions debuted and peaked at #1. The original version by Carlsson held the number one spot in Sweden for six weeks.

== Agnes version ==
The song appears on her debut album Agnes.

=== Track listings ===
CD single

1. "Right Here Right Now (My Heart Belongs to You)" – 4:09
2. "Right Here Right Now (My Heart Belongs to You)" [Instrumental] – 4:09

=== Chart performance ===
==== Weekly charts ====
Chart (2005–2006)	Peak position
Sweden (Sverigetopplistan)	1

==== Year-end charts ====
Chart (2005)	Position
Sweden (Sverigetopplistan)	1

== Raffaëla version ==
"Right Here, Right Now (My Heart Belongs to You)"

Single by Raffaëla Paton

from the album Raffaëla
- Released: March 17, 2006
- Recorded: 2006
- Genre: Pop
- Length: 3:37
- Label: Sony BMG
- Songwriter(s): Jörgen Elofsson
- Producer(s): Henkjan Smits, Eric van Tijn

Raffaëla Paton singles chronology
"Right Here, Right Now (My Heart Belongs to You)" (2006)	"Mijn Houten Hart" (2006)

=== Track listing ===
CD single/Digital download

1. "Right Here Right Now (My Heart Belongs to You)" – 3:36
2. "Right Here Right Now (My Heart Belongs to You)" [Instrumental] – 3:37

=== Music video ===
The music video to Raffaëla's "Right Here, Right Now" contains scenes of the performance of the song on Idols. It also contains images of when Raffaëla was a little girl and when she received her platinum single award.

=== Chart performance ===
Chart (2006)	Peak position
Dutch Top 40	1
Dutch Mega Top 100 Singles	1
Dutch Mega Top 50 Airplay	1
