= Camilla Gervide =

Swedish blogger (born 1980)

Camilla Gervide (born Carlqvist, 17 November 1980) is a Swedish blogger and citizen journalist, who runs a celebrity gossip blog named Bloggbevakning.

== Education and career ==
Gervide grew up in Emmaboda, Småland, but later moved to Nybro. After graduating from Åkrahällskolan in Nybro in 1999 she moved to the US to work as a nanny.

In 2003 she began her studies in singing and piano at Musicians Institute in Hollywood from where she received a double examina. She aimed for a career as a musician auditioning for Suge Knight at Death Row Records. In 2006 she wrote the theme song to the documentary Tille's resa.

Gervide's career as a blogger started in 1999, blogging about her whereabouts in the US. Later on the topic changed and from 2010 she wrote about music in a blog named camillagervide.com. In 2012 she started an additional blog about LCHF dieting where the readers were to follow her journey healing from having, according to herself, "broken her back twice".

Among her jobs over time she has been working as a music columnist at Nyheter24 as well as, as mentioned in interviews, working at MTV. She was also frequently interviewed as an expert on the topic of music in various media outlets.

Since 2016, she runs the blog Bloggbevakning, publishing daily gossip about influencers. As of 2026, the blog is published through the Swedish news site Nyheter24. Her related Instagram account, also named Bloggbevakning, has 61 000 followers as of July 2026.

Gervide is also a co-host if the celebrity gossip podcast Sanning & Konsekvens, hosted by Nyheter24.

In november 2023 her book De kallar oss influencers (They call us influencers) was published through Mondial.

== Personal life ==
Gervide lives in Saltsjö-Boo, Nacka Municipality.

Gervide has openly spoken about her being a sober alcoholic and being diagnosed with fibromyalgia.

== Controversy ==
- Gervide has been criticized in Swedish media for editing her own Wikipedia page and, while doing so, exaggerating many of her achievements of which many can't be verified through any external sources. Among other things, Gervide claimed to have worked as a studio musician to David Foster, Celine Dion, That 70's Show and American Idol.
- While Gervide presents the Bloggbevakning blog as being an investigative blog questioning the influencer industry much of the received criticism points out that the vast majority of her posts still consists of gossip, with Gervide focusing more on herself, her personal feuds and conflicts with influencers rather than the underlying structures of the industry.
- Gervide has repeatedly been criticized for promoting bullying, both through the way she writes about influencers herself and because of how the comment section of the blog is managed. Gervide has addressed the accusations, stating she should be able to investigate the industry without being accused of bullying. In 2021 Swedish influencer Bisse criticized Gervide for posting images of her newborn child while commenting on her appearance as a newly delivered mother which led to the comment section filling up with hateful comments. Gervide responded on Instagram, saying she did not understand why someone who just had a child would read comments about herself and suggested Bisse suffered from self-harm behaviors. Later, both Gervide and the editor in chief at Nyheter24 apologized.
- In 2012, Gervide criticized VeckoRevyn Blog Awards after losing the prize in the category she was nominated in to a person who did not have a blog, but only used Instagram.

== Community engagement ==
Readers of Bloggbevakning have participated in extensive discussions in the blog's comment sections through a series of posts named Öppet Spår.

== Recognition ==
In 2012, Gervide was nominated for Blogger of the Year in the category 'Årets bloggraket' at the VeckoRevyn Blog Awards.
