= You and Me (Joan Franka song) =

2012 single by Joan Franka

Single by Joan Franka
- Released: 27 February 2012
- Recorded: 2011
- Genre: Country pop
- Length: 3:01
- Songwriters: Joan Franka, Jessica Hogenboom

Joan Franka singles chronology
"Promise Me" (2011)	"You and Me" (2012)	"Nigel" (2014)

Music video
- "You and Me" (Official) on YouTube

Eurovision Song Contest 2012 entry
- Country: Netherlands
- Artist: Joan Franka
- Language: English
- Composers: Joan Franka, Jessica Hoogenboom (Jessie Maria)
- Lyricists: Joan Franka, Jessica Hogenboom

Finals performance
- Semi-final result: 15th
- Semi-final points: 35

Entry chronology
- ◄ "Never Alone" (2011)
- "Birds" (2013) ►

"You and Me" is a song by singer songwriter Joan Franka. It was chosen to represent the Netherlands in the Eurovision Song Contest 2012. The song was released in the Netherlands as a Digital download on 27 February 2012. Franka wrote and composed the song together with Jessica Hoogenboom (artist name Jessie Maria).

Within the first week after the release of You And Me, on 2 March 2012, the single hit No. 1 on the Dutch Single Top 100.

== Background ==
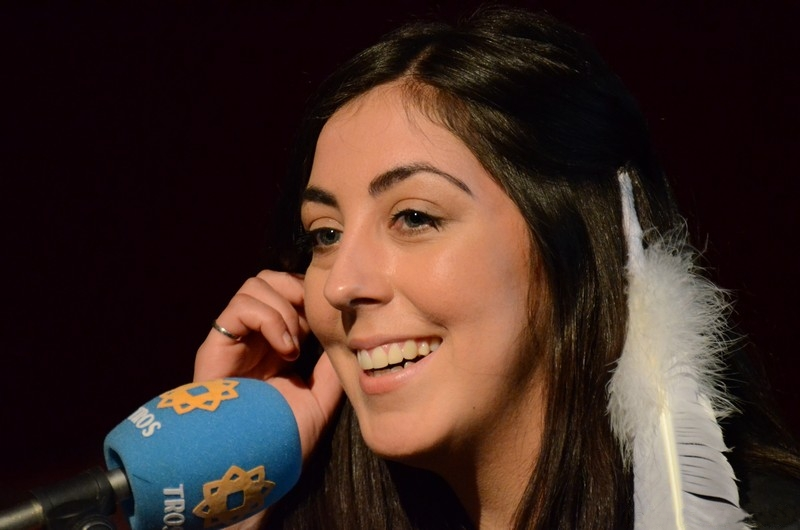
Joan Franka, 2012

On 26 February 2012, Joan Franka performed "You and Me" at the Nationaal Songfestival, wearing a Native American headdress designed by Nicoline van Marle. The background for her suit comes from the origin of the text of her song. That is about an innocent young love of herself when she was five years old and playing 'Indians' with her little boyfriend. In her performance she sings and plays the guitar, and is being flanked by four female dancers with tambourines, a drum and a small string instrument, probably a small ukulele accompanied with music from a banjo.

== Music video ==
A music video was released on 8ball TV's YouTube channel on 5 April 2012, and the video shows Joan Franka recalling memories with the boy that she loved back then. In the video, the young Franka and the boy are shown to be together doing a variety of activities, including reading, skipping together, and Franka giving a kiss to the boy. Throughout the video, Franka is shown to be wearing a Native American headdress. Franka is also shown, all grown up to be frolicking in a forest and playing guitar near a campfire, recalling the memories.

== At Eurovision ==
In the running order draw, determined on 20 March 2012, Netherlands was drawn to perform third.

During the performance, Franka had a new headdress and wore a long azure dress. Unlike her performance at Nationaal Songfestival, the back-up dancers were replaced by a band consisting of four men playing the guitar, violin, accordion and banjo but the female back-vocalist was still present. The song was slightly altered to include a violin solo after the bridge of the song. Despite the changes, the song finished in 15th place with 35 points and did not advance to the finals. It was the 8th straight year that the Netherlands failed to progress from the semi-finals.

However, if it was up to the public it would have advanced finishing 10th in the televote.

== Track listing ==
CD single

1. "You and Me" – 3:01

Digital download

1. "You and Me" – 3:01

== Credits and personnel ==
- Lead vocals – Joan Franka
- Producers – Joan Franka, Jessica Hoogenboom
- Lyrics – Joan Franka, Jessica Hoogenboom

== Chart performance ==
=== Peak positions ===
Charts	Peak position
Netherlands (Single Top 100)	1
Netherlands (Dutch Top 40)	7

=== Year-end charts ===
Chart (2012)	Position
Netherlands (Mega Single Top 100)	65

== Release history ==
Country	Date	Format
Netherlands	27 February 2012	Digital download
