= Leonie Meijer =

Dutch singer and songwriter

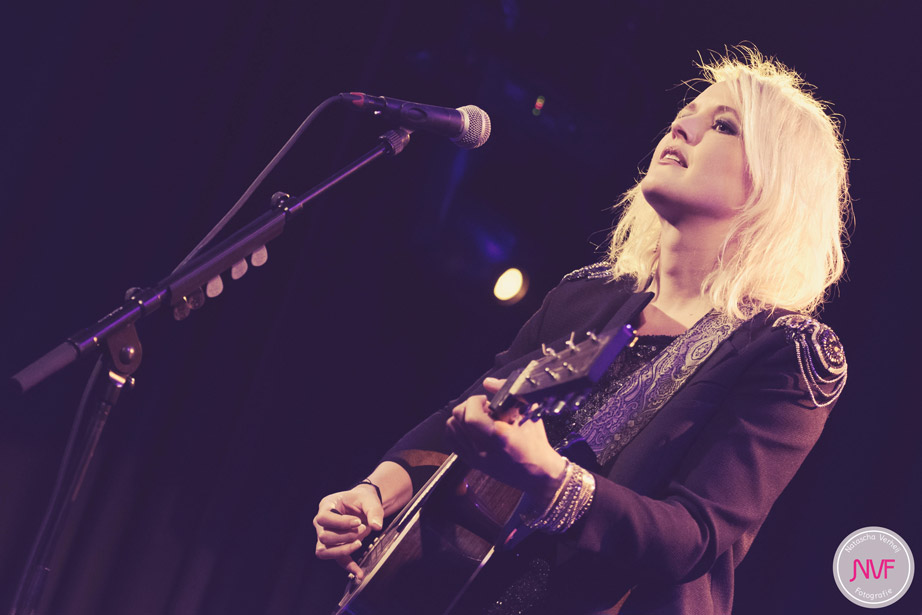
- Naked Tour in Paradiso, Amsterdam, 2015

Background information
- Born: 1985 (age 40–41); Rotterdam, Netherlands
- Genres: Pop, pop rock
- Occupations: Singer, songwriter
- Instruments: Guitar, Drums
- Years active: 2010–present
- Labels: Cloud 9 Music
- Website: www.leoniemeijer.com

Leonie Meijer (born September 4, 1985) is a Dutch singer and songwriter.

== Training ==
Born in Rotterdam, Meijer studied at the Music Academy in Lelystad from the age of 18. She then attended the Amsterdam Conservatory while performing as a singer and guitar player with the band Material Spirit during her free time.

In 2010 she reached the finals of Netherlands Great Prize. Later she auditioned for the Dutch version of the show The Voice.

== Professional career ==
=== The Voice (2010–2011) ===
Being coached by Jeroen van der Boom, she made it to the qualification rounds of The Voice. Her cover of Maria Mena’s song Just Hold Me climbed to the 27th position in the Single Top 100 chart. At the final stage she got fourth place, which allowed her to record her own song, Lost in Yesterday. The single reached number 36 in the Top 40 Netherlands.

=== Los (2011–2012) ===
Soon after she had a part in Michael Jackson’s tribute concert, where she sang various of his songs. Next step was the recording of a duet with Van der Boom – her old coach – called Los van de grond, which reached second position in the Top 100 and 13th in the Top 40. In May 2011 she released her single Schaduw and in October of the same year her debut album was out, Los, whose first single – Hey! – entered the Top 40. The very same week another song was climbing in the Top 40, it was Wereldwijd, by the Metropolitan Orchestral in collaboration with several artists, among them Meijer.

=== Luister maar (2013) ===
The first single from her second album – Niemand als jij – was released in 2012, in the 81st position of the Top 100. Her second work included collaborations with Roel van Velzen and Nick Schilder, most of music composing though belong to Meijer and Daniel Gibson, who also worked on her debut record. The track list includes the single Wacht tot ik bij je ben – with Joost Marsman – and Scherven van geluk, specially written for Leonie by Van Velzen and Schilder.

=== Collaborations (2014) ===
Collaborations marks a turn toward English, and with The Prophet and Noisecontrollers she recorded the song "Make Me Stay". With Dutch rapper Brainpower she released the single "Won't Come Back".

=== The Naked Sessions (2015) ===
Meijer's third album, The Naked Sessions, attempted to reproduces the atmosphere of her live shows, with more acoustic arrangements.

The single "Door Hetzelfde IJs" is slated for release on April 22, 2016.

=== NJ 123 (2017) ===
Meijer released the album NJ 123 in October 2017, and toured with Hier.
