= Champion (Agnes song) =

Single by Agnes Carlsson

from the album Stronger
- Released: 22 November 2006
- Recorded: 2006
- Genre: Pop
- Length: 3:06
- Label: Sony BMG/Columbia Records
- Songwriter(s): A. Carlsson, C. Richardson, E. Olsson
- Producer(s): Emanuel Olsson

Agnes Carlsson singles chronology
"Kick Back Relax" (2006)	"Champion" (2006)	"On and On" (2008)

"Champion" is a pop song recorded by Swedish singer Agnes taken from her second studio album Stronger. The track was written by Agnes Carlsson, Curtis A. Richardson, and Emanuel Olsson and produced by Emanuel Olsson for Cosmos Productions. It was released as the album's second single in Sweden.

== Music video ==
A music video was produced to promote the single. The video was directed by Peter Mars.

== Track listing ==
CD-single (EAN 0886970414029)

(Released: November 22, 2006) (Columbia/Sony BMG)

1. "Champion" [Radio Edit] — 3:27
2. "Champion" [Instrumental] — 3:27

Digital download

(Released: November 15, 2006) (Columbia/Sony BMG)

1. "Champion" [Radio Edit] — 3:27

== Chart performance ==
Chart (2006)	Peak position
Sweden (Sverigetopplistan)	19
