= All I Want Is You (Agnes song) =

Single by Agnes

from the album Veritas
- Released: August 31, 2012
- Recorded: 2012
- Genre: Dance-pop; synthpop; house; disco
- Label: Roxy/Universal Music
- Songwriters: Agnes, Ana Diaz, Jonas Quant
- Producer: Jonas Quant

Agnes singles chronology
"One Last Time" (2012)	"All I Want Is You" (2012)	"Life (Diamonds in the Dark)" (2013)

"All I Want Is You" is a song by Swedish recording artist Agnes. The song was written by Agnes, Ana Diaz, and Jonas Quant. The latter produced the song for Agnes' fourth studio album, Veritas (2012). The song received its radio debut on Sveriges Radio P3 on August 29. It was released as the second single from the album on August 31, 2012.

== Background ==
In July 2012, Agnes debuted the song at her performance at Stockholm Pride. On August 27, 2012, Agnes revealed the release date and artwork for the single. The single was sent to radio stations across Sweden on August 29, one week before the release of her fourth studio album "Veritas". The same day blogger Perez Hilton premiered the lyrics video of the song exclusively on his website and commenting it with "Agnes Doesn't Want Much… All She Wants Is You! And all WE want it more Agnes! Seems like a fair trade to us!" Agnes has self stated that "All I Want Is You" is feverish, and ambiguous, perhaps a declaration of love, but equally a story of obsession.

== Music video ==
A lyric video for the song was released on Agnes official YouTube page on 30 August 2012.

== Critical reception ==
UK blogger, Scandipop, compared the tune with her previous hit "Release Me" saying that "those who wanted something similar to that era will be pleased to learn "All I Want Is You" is a respectful nod back to that sound. Dancepop, with a heavy emphasis on the strings." However he admitted that the sound of the single evolved the appropriate way for the last four years, and he paid homage to producer Jonas Quant, who wrote the song along with Ana Diaz and Agnes herself, for this. JonAli described the song as "an emotional disco anthem with lush strings and a flawless vocal from the Swedish diva." "All I Want Is You” brings us back to the friendly dance beats we are use [sic] to hearing from her hits 'Release Me' and 'Don’t Go Breaking My Heart'."

== Track listing ==
- Digital download
1. "All I Want Is You" – 3:21

== Charts ==
Chart (2012)	Peak position
Swedish Singles Chart (Downloads)	9

== Release history ==
Region	Date	Format	Label
Sweden	August 29, 2012	Airplay	Roxy/Universal Music
Sweden	August 31, 2012	Digital download/streaming	Roxy/Universal Music
