= Joan Franka =

Dutch singer and songwriter (born 1990)

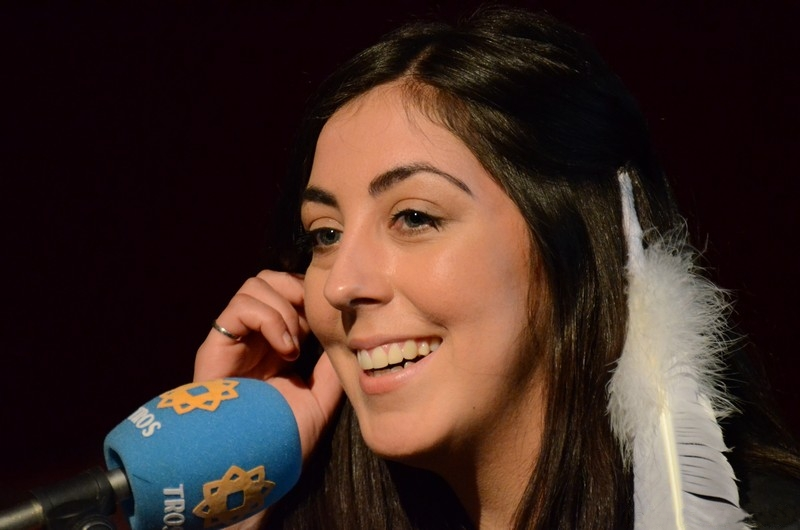
- Joan Franka in 2012

Background information
- Born: Joany Franka Johanna Ayten Hazebroek Kalan; 2 April 1990 (age 36); Rotterdam, Netherlands
- Genres: Pop; folk; Americana
- Occupations: Singer; songwriter
- Years active: 2010–present
- Website: www.joanfranka.com

Joany Franka Johanna Ayten Hazebroek Kalan (born 2 April 1990), known professionally as Joan Franka, is a Dutch singer and songwriter. She represented the Netherlands in the Eurovision Song Contest 2012 with the song "You and Me". She became known in the Netherlands through her participation in the first season of The Voice of Holland.

== Music career ==
=== 2010–2011: The Voice of Holland ===
In September 2010, Hazebroek entered the inaugural 2010–2011 season of the talent show The Voice of Holland. She auditioned with Nickelback's "How You Remind Me". Two out of four judges hit their "I Want You" buttons, and she chose to join the team of Roel van Velzen. She advanced from the Battle round, where she performed "One of Us" by Joan Osborne.

In the first live show, Hazebroek performed Jewel's "Foolish Games", followed by Marc Cohn's "Walking in Memphis" in the third live show. She was eliminated in the fifth live show, following her performance of "Promise Me" by Beverley Craven. Two of the songs she sang during the competition charted as minor hits in the Dutch Single Top 100: "Foolish Games" reached number 42 and "Promise Me" reached number 45, based on downloads.

=== 2012: Eurovision Song Contest ===
In 2012, Hazebroek entered the Nationaal Songfestival, the Dutch national selection for the Eurovision Song Contest 2012, with the song "You and Me". In the final on 26 February 2012, she won her duel against fellow The Voice of Holland alum Raffaëla Paton, and advanced to the superfinal alongside Pearl Jozefzoon and Ivan Peroti. Despite coming last with the expert jury, she won over 50% of the televote. As a result, Hazebroek won the competition and was chosen to represent the Netherlands in the Eurovision Song Contest 2012 in Baku, Azerbaijan. She performed in the second semi-final on 24 May 2012, but failed to qualify for the final. This marked the Netherlands' eighth consecutive elimination in the semi-finals of the Eurovision Song Contest.

=== 2014–2023: Luba the Baroness and comeback ===
From 2014 to 2017, Hazebroek attended the Herman Brood Academie in Utrecht. During her studies, she developed the alter ego 'Luba the Baroness'. In 2021, she appeared in the Belgian documentary series I aime who I am, in which she commented on the impact of her participation in the Eurovision Song Contest on her self-image. In 2023, Hazebroek participated in the second season of the RTL 4 television show Better Than Ever, where she performed a cover of "The Night We Met" by Lord Huron. In the show, she revealed to have been in conflict with her record label following her Eurovision Song Contest participation, due to negative experiences with, among others, her manager. She also revealed that she had disagreed to wear the controversial Native American headdress during her Eurovision performance. On 7 April 2023, she released her debut studio album Luba the Baroness, containing songs she wrote in 2017.

== Discography ==
=== Studio albums ===
Album	Year	Details
Luba the Baroness	2023	Released: 7 April 2023; Label: self-released; Format: streaming

=== Singles ===
Single	Year	Peak chart positions	Album
Single	Year	NL	Album
"Foolish Games"	2010	42	Non-album singles
"Promise Me"	2011	45	Non-album singles
"You and Me"	2012	1	Non-album singles
"Nigel"	2014	—	Non-album singles
"The End"	2019	—	Luba the Baroness
"The Night We Met"	2023	—	Non-album single

Awards and achievements
Preceded by 3JS with "Never alone"	Netherlands in the Eurovision Song Contest; 2012	Succeeded by Anouk with "Birds"
