= Life (Diamonds in the Dark) =

Single by John Dahlbäck featuring Agnes
- Released: February 25, 2013
- Recorded: 2012; Gothenburg, Sweden
- Genre: Progressive house
- Label: Big Beat Records
- Songwriter(s): John Dahlbäck
- Producer(s): John Dahlbäck

Agnes singles chronology
"All I Want Is You" (2012)	"Life (Diamonds in the Dark)" (2013)	"Got Me Good" (2013)

"'Life (Diamonds in the Dark)" is a song by Swedish DJ and producer John Dahlbäck featuring Swedish recording artist Agnes. Dahlbäck originally released the instrumental version of the song called "Life" in February 2012, but later got Swedish singer Agnes to sing the vocals on the re-release. In an interview with American magazine "Billboard" Dahlbäck commented on the co-operation with Agnes; "“She’s one of the biggest pop stars in Sweden, so for me it was a big honor to have her on the track. This may not be what she’d do normally, but she’s very happy with the result.”

The song was released together with three remixes that accompanied the February 25, 2013, release. Dahlback selected remixes from Australian upstarts Feenixpawl, fellow Swedish DJs Lunde Bros., and Canadian electro-house artist Lazy Rich.

== Track listings ==
Digital download/streaming

(Released: February 25, 2013)

1. "Life (Diamonds in the Dark) - Original Mix " —
2. "Life (Diamonds in the Dark) - Feenixpawl remix " —
3. "Life (Diamonds in the Dark) - Lunde Bros. remix" —
4. "Life (Diamonds in the Dark) - Lazy Rich remix " —
