= Got Me Good (Agnes song) =

Single by Agnes

from the album Veritas
- Released: 27 May 2013
- Recorded: 2012 in Stockholm, Sweden
- Genre: Dance-pop; synthpop
- Length: 3:26 (album version); 3:46 (Bassflow Remake)
- Label: Roxy; Universal Music
- Songwriters: Agnes Carlsson; Vincent Pontare; Magnus Lidehäll; Miriam Nervo; Olivia Nervo
- Producers: Magnus Lidehäll; Vincent Pontare; Peter Boström

Agnes singles chronology
"Life (Diamonds in the Dark)" (2013)	"Got Me Good" (2013)	"Tough Love" (2019)

"Got Me Good" is a song by Swedish recording artist Agnes from her fourth studio album Veritas. The song was released as the third single from the album in Sweden on 27 May 2013.

== Background ==
The song was remixed for the single release. Peter Boström, also known as Bassflow, did the remake; hence the single was called "The Bassflow Remake". Agnes has earlier commented on the song as a "glimpse into the uniquely human habit of falling in love, or cutter, in someone who does not reciprocate the affection." UK blogger Scandipop was the first to announce the single on their website and also being positive about the remix release; "The new version doesn’t stray too far away from the pop magic of the original, which is good. Instead, it just freshens the song up a tad, and adds a certain level of epic dreaminess to the whole thing."

== Track listing ==
Digital download

1. "Got Me Good" (Bassflow Remake) — 3:46

== Charts ==
Chart (2013)	Peak position
Swedish Singles Chart (Downloads)	53
