= Agnes (album) =

Studio album by Agnes
- Released: 19 December 2005
- Length: 35:48
- Label: Columbia
- Producer: Richard Brandén; Douglas Carr; Jörgen Elofsson; Tomas Granlind; Grizzly/Tysper; Richie Jones; Vincent Pontare; Johan Röhr; George Samuelson; Fredrik Thomander; Twin; Pär Westerlund; Anders Wikström

Agnes chronology
Agnes (2005)	Stronger (2006)

Singles from Agnes
- 1. "Right Here Right Now" Released: 7 December 2005; 2. "Stranded" Released: 22 March 2006

Professional ratings
Review scores
Source	Rating
Expressen	2/5 stars
Helsingborgs Dagblad	2/5 stars
Svenska Dagbladet	2.5/5 stars

Agnes is the self-titled debut studio album by Swedish singer and Idol 2005 winner Agnes Carlsson, released on 19 December 2005 by Columbia Records. It debuted at number one on the Swedish Albums Chart and stayed there for two weeks. The album's lead single, "Right Here, Right Now (My Heart Belongs to You)", written and produced by Jörgen Elofsson, topped the Swedish Singles Chart for six weeks. The second single from the album, "Stranded", was less successful, peaking at number 27 on the Swedish Singles Chart.

== Track listing ==
Agnes track listing
No.	Title	Writer(s)	Producer(s)	Length
1.	"Stranded"	Niclas Molinder; Joacim Persson; Pelle Ankarberg; Kerima Holm	Twin	3:16
2.	"Emotional"	Fredrik Thomander; Anders Wikström	Thomander; Wikström	3:00
3.	"Right Here, Right Now (My Heart Belongs to You)"	Jörgen Elofsson	Elofsson; Pär Westerlund; Richard Brandén	4:08
4.	"Forever Yours"	Thomander; Wikström	Thomander; Wikström	3:26
5.	"Get My Math"	Johan Åberg; George Samuelsson; Canela Cox	Samuelsson	3:04
6.	"I Believe"	Richie Jones; Aldo Nova; Vincent Pontare	Douglas Carr; Jones; Pontare	3:26
7.	"For Love"	M. Albertsson; N. Pettersson	Samuelsson; Tomas Granlind	4:06
8.	"What a Feeling"	Giorgio Moroder; Irene Cara; Keith Forsey	Samuelsson; Tomas Granlind	3:38
9.	"Now That I Found Love"	Markus "Mack" Sepehrmanesh; Tommy Tysper; Gustav "Grizzly" Jonsson; Axel Breitung	Jonsson; Tysper	3:43
10.	"Let Me Carry You"	Elofsson	Johan Röhr	4:01
Total length:				35:48

== Charts ==
=== Weekly charts ===
Weekly chart performance for Agnes
Chart (2005–06)	Peak position
European Albums (Billboard)	57
Swedish Albums (Sverigetopplistan)	1

=== Year-end charts ===
2005 year-end chart performance for Agnes
Chart (2005)	Position
Swedish Albums (Sverigetopplistan)	17

2006 year-end chart performance for Agnes
Chart (2006)	Position
Swedish Albums (Sverigetopplistan)	79

== Certifications ==
Certifications for Agnes
Region	Certification	Certified units/sales
Sweden (GLF)	Platinum	60,000^{^}
^{^} Shipments figures based on certification alone.

== Release history ==
Agnes release history
Region	Date	Format	Label	Ref.
Sweden	19 December 2005	CD; digital download	Columbia	
United States	8 September 2009	Digital download	Columbia	
