= Latvia in the Eurovision Song Contest 2014 =

- Eurovision Song Contest 2014
- Participating broadcaster: Latvijas Televīzija (LTV)
- Country: Latvia
- Selection process: Dziesma 2014
- Selection date: 22 February 2014

Competing entry
- Song: "Cake to Bake"
- Artist: Aarzemnieki
- Songwriters: Guntis Veilands

Placement
- Semi-final result: Failed to qualify (13th)

Participation chronology

Latvia was represented at the Eurovision Song Contest 2014 with the song "Cake to Bake", written by Guntis Veilands, and performed by the band Aarzemnieki. The Latvian participating broadcaster, Latvijas Televīzija (LTV), organised the national final Dziesma 2014 in order to select its entry for the contest. Twenty-four songs were selected to compete in the national final, which consisted of three shows: two semi-finals and a final. In the semi-finals on 1 and 2 February 2014, six entries were selected to advance from each show. Twelve songs ultimately qualified to compete in the final on 22 February 2014 where two rounds of voting by a public televote and a nine-member jury panel selected "Cake to Bake" performed by Aarzemnieki as the winner.

Latvia was drawn to compete in the first semi-final of the Eurovision Song Contest which took place on 6 May 2014. Performing during the show in position 2, "Cake to Bake" was not announced among the top 10 entries of the first semi-final and therefore did not qualify to compete in the final. It was later revealed that Latvia placed thirteenth out of the 16 participating countries in the semi-final with 33 points.

== Background ==
Prior to the 2014 contest, Latvijas Televīzija (LTV) had participated in the Eurovision Song Contest representing Latvia fourteen times since its first entry in 2000. It won the contest once in 2002 with the song "I Wanna" performed by Marie N. Following the introduction of semi-finals for the 2004, Latvia was able to qualify to compete in the final between 2005 and 2008. Between 2009 and 2013, it had failed to qualify to the final for five consecutive years including with its 2013 entry "Here We Go" performed by PeR.

As part of its duties as participating broadcaster, LTV organises the selection of its entry in the Eurovision Song Contest and broadcasts the event in the country. The broadcaster confirmed its intentions to participate at the 2014 contest on 24 September 2013. The broadcaster has selected its entries for the contest through a national final. Since their debut in 2000 until 2012, LTV had organised the selection show Eirodziesma. In a response to the failure to qualify to the final at Eurovision since 2008, the competition in 2013 was rebranded and retooled as Dziesma. Along with its participation confirmation, the broadcaster announced that it would organise Dziesma 2014 in order to select the entry for the 2014 contest.

== Before Eurovision ==
=== Dziesma 2014 ===
Dziesma 2014 was the second edition of Dziesma, the music competition that selects Latvia's entries for the Eurovision Song Contest. The competition commenced with the first of two-semi finals on 1 February 2014 and concluded with a final on 22 February 2014. All shows in the competition were hosted by Ēriks Loks and Nauris Brikmanis and broadcast on LTV1 and Riga Radio as well as online via the broadcaster's official website ltv.lv. The final was also streamed online at the official Eurovision Song Contest website eurovision.tv.

==== Format ====
The format of the competition consisted of three shows: two semi-finals and a final. The two semi-finals, held on 1 and 2 February 2014, each featured twelve competing entries from which six advanced to the final from each show. The final, held on 22 February 2014, selected the Latvian entry for Copenhagen from the remaining twelve entries over two rounds of voting: the first round selected the top three songs and the second round (superfinal) selected the winner. Results during the semi-final and final shows were determined by the 50/50 combination of votes from a jury panel and a public vote. Both the jury and public vote assigned points from 1 to 12 based on ranking in the semi-finals and the first round of the final, with the first place receiving one point and last place receiving twelve points. In the superfinal, the jury and public both assigned points from 1 to 3 also based on ranking with the first place receiving one point and last place receiving three points. Ties were decided in favour of the entries that received higher points from the public. Viewers were able to vote via telephone up to five times or via SMS with a single SMS counting as five votes. The online vote conducted through the website eirovizija.lv allowed users to vote once per each accepted social network account: Draugiem.lv, Facebook and Twitter.

==== Competing entries ====
Songwriters were able to submit their entries to the broadcaster between 1 October 2013 and 20 November 2013. LTV adopted the slogan Made in Latvia for the competition, meaning that all songwriters were required to have Latvian citizenship or residency unlike in previous years. 73 entries were submitted at the conclusion of the submission period; 60 of the songs were in English, 11 were in Latvian and one each were in French and Russian. A jury panel appointed by LTV evaluated the submitted songs and the twenty-four selected songwriters had until 7 January 2014 to nominate the performers for their songs. The jury panel consisted of Aija Strazdiņa (director and producer), Aija Vītoliņa (singer), Ģirts Lūsis (musician, composer and manager of the groups Labvēlīgais tips and 2007 Latvian Eurovision entrant Bonaparti.lv), Kārlis Auzāns (producer and composer), Kristaps Krievkalns (musician and composer), Adam Klein (British music manager), John Ballard (Swedish composer and producer) and Maja Keuc (2011 Slovenian Eurovision entrant). The twenty-four competing songs were announced during a press conference on 2 December 2013, while the competing artists were announced on 8 January 2014.

| Artist | Song | Songwriter(s) |
|---|---|---|
| Aarzemnieki | "Cake to Bake" | Guntis Veilands |
| Aminata Savadogo | "I Can Breathe" | Aminata Savadogo |
| Andris Kivičs | "Pa vidu tu" | Andris Kivičs |
| Anete Volmane | "Breathe Slow" | Edgars Viļums, Anete Volmane |
| Crazy Dolls | "Bučas" | Aldis Zaļūksnis, Mārtiņs Poļakovskis |
| Dāvis Matskins | "I Need More" | Alise Ketnere |
| DJ Dween and Sabīne Berezina | "Dejo tā" | Kaspars Dvinskis, Sabīne Berezina |
| Dons | "Pēdējā vēstule" | Artūrs Šingirejs, Ingus Bērziņš |
| Eirošmits | "If I Could (Get Away)" | Miks Žagars, Raitis Aušmuksts |
| Ivo Grīsniņš-Grīslis | "I've Got" | Ivo Grīsniņš-Grīslis |
| Katrīna Bindere | "Moment and Tomorrow" | Edgars Beļickis, Kārlis Auziņš, Mikus Frišvelds |
| Katrine Lukins | "You Are the Reason" | Katrine Lukins, Kārlis Indrišonoks |
| Mad Show Boys | "I Need a Soul-Twin" | Garijs Poļskis |
| Markus Riva | "Lights On" | Gaitis Lazdāns, Markus Riva |
| MyRadiantU | "Going All the Way" | Janis Driksna |
| Niko | "Here I Am Again" | Vladimirs Koževņikovs |
| Olga and Līgo | "Saule riet" | Tomass Kleins, Guntars Račs |
| Oskars Deigelis | "Just Stop" | Oskars Deigelis, Ruslans Kuksinovičs |
| Ralfs Eilands and Valters Pūce | "Revelation" | Ralfs Eilands, Valters Pūce, Ansis Grūbe |
| Sabīne Berezina | "Pressure" | Žanna Berezina |
| Sabīne Vidriķe | "Is It Possible" | Edgard Kokorevičs, Sabīne Vidriķe |
| Samanta Tīna | "Stay" | Ingars Viļums |
| Tamāra Rutkovska | "I'm Happy" | Tamāra Rutkovska |
| U.K. | "What If It Was" | Rolands Ūdris |

==== Semi-finals ====
The two semi-finals took place at the Palladium Concert Hall in Riga on 1 and 2 February 2014. In each semi-final twelve acts competed and six entries qualified to the final based on the combination of votes from a jury panel and the Latvian public. The jury panel that voted in the semi-finals consisted of Kristaps Krievkalns (musician, composer and arranger), Jegors Jerohomovičs (music critic and cultural journalist), Aija Strazdiņa (director and producer), Ģirts Lūsis (musician, composer, producer and manager), Uldis Cīrulis aka DJ Monsta (DJ at Riga Radio), Gabriel Broggini (member of 2012 Swiss Eurovision entrant Sinplus), Ivan Broggini (member of 2012 Swiss Eurovision entrant Sinplus), Vineta Elksne (singer, vocal coach, conductor and songwriter; first semi-final), Jānis Palkavnieks (spokesman for Draugiem.lv; first semi-final), Zita Lunde (editor-in-chief of web portal TVNET; second semi-final) and Artūrs Ancāns (artistic director of the Emīls Dārziņš Mixed Choir and chairman of the board of the Latvian Choir Conductors Association; second semi-final).

Semi-final 1 – 1 February 2014
| R/O | Artist | Song | Jury rank | Public Vote rank | | Result |
| R/O | Artist | Song | Jury rank | Internet rank | Televote rank | Result |
|---|---|---|---|---|---|---|
| 1 | DJ Dween and Sabīne Berezina | "Dejo tā" | 9 | 7 | 10 | —N/a |
| 2 | Crazy Dolls | "Bučas" | 8 | 11 | 12 | —N/a |
| 3 | Tamara Rutkovska | "I'm Happy" | 11 | 12 | 9 | —N/a |
| 4 | Niko | "Here I Am Again" | 7 | 4 | 2 | Advanced |
| 5 | Ivo Grīsniņš-Grīslis | "I've Got" | 5 | 10 | 11 | —N/a |
| 6 | Aarzemnieki | "Cake to Bake" | 6 | 2 | 3 | Advanced |
| 7 | Oskars Deigelis | "Just Stop" | 10 | 9 | 8 | —N/a |
| 8 | Samanta Tīna | "Stay" | 1 | 5 | 5 | Advanced |
| 9 | MyRadiantU | "Going All the Way" | 3 | 6 | 7 | Advanced |
| 10 | Aminata Savadogo | "I Can Breathe" | 4 | 3 | 4 | Advanced |
| 11 | Dāvis Matskins | "I Need More" | 12 | 8 | 6 | —N/a |
| 12 | Olga and Līgo | "Saule riet" | 2 | 1 | 1 | Advanced |

Semi-final 2 – 2 February 2014
| R/O | Artist | Song | Jury rank | Public Vote rank | | Result |
| R/O | Artist | Song | Jury rank | Internet rank | Televote rank | Result |
|---|---|---|---|---|---|---|
| 1 | Ralfs Eilands and Valters Pūce | "Revelation" | 2 | 4 | 4 | Advanced |
| 2 | Katrine Lukins | "You Are The Reason" | 4 | 3 | 7 | Advanced |
| 3 | Mad Show Boys | "I Need a Soul-Twin" | 10 | 9 | 6 | —N/a |
| 4 | Markus Riva | "Lights On" | 3 | 10 | 5 | Advanced |
| 5 | Anete Volmane | "Breathe Slow" | 12 | 5 | 11 | —N/a |
| 6 | U.K. | "What If It Was" | 5 | 6 | 10 | —N/a |
| 7 | Katrīna Bindere | "Moment and tomorrow" | 7 | 8 | 1 | Advanced |
| 8 | Andris Kivičs | "Pa vidu tu" | 9 | 12 | 12 | —N/a |
| 9 | Dons | "Pēdējā vēstule" | 1 | 1 | 2 | Advanced |
| 10 | Sabīne Vidriķe | "Is It Possible" | 11 | 11 | 3 | —N/a |
| 11 | Sabīne Berezina | "Pressure" | 6 | 7 | 8 | —N/a |
| 12 | Eirošmits | "If I Could (Get Away)" | 8 | 2 | 9 | Advanced |

==== Final ====
The final took place at the Jūras vārti Theatre in Ventspils on 22 February 2014. The twelve entries that qualified from the preceding two semi-finals competed and the winner was selected over two rounds of voting. In the first round, three songs advanced to the second round, the superfinal, based on the combination of votes from a jury panel and the Latvian public. The public vote in the first round was conducted via televote only due to technical issues with the online vote. In the superfinal, "Cake to Bake" performed by Aarzemnieki was selected as the winner through the combination of votes from the jury and public. Dons and Aarzemnieki were tied at 3 points each but since Aarzemnieki received the most votes from the public they were declared the winner. The jury panel that voted in the final consisted of Kristaps Krievkalns (musician, composer and arranger), Sandris Vanzovičs (music journalist), Aija Strazdina (director and producer), Ģirts Lūsis (musician, composer and manager of the groups Labvēlīgais tips and 2007 Latvian Eurovision entrant Bonaparti.lv), Uldis Cīrulis aka DJ Monsta (DJ at Riga Radio), Ieva Rozentāle (head of the LTV Culture Broadcasts Editorial Office), Agnese Cimuška (general manager of the Latvian Music Development Society and Music Export Latvia), Andres Kõpper (singer, lead vocalist of the Estonian band Tenfold Rabbit) and Rihards Zaļupe (composer and percussionist).

In addition to the performances of the competing entries, guest performers included singer Normunds Rutulis, 2003 Latvian Eurovision entrant (as part of F.L.Y.) Lauris Reiniks, 2004 Latvian Eurovision entrant Fomins and Kleins, 2013 Latvian Eurovision entrant PeR performing together with Tenfold Rabbit and Lithuanian singer Jurga.

Final – 22 February 2014
| R/O | Artist | Song | Jury rank | Televote | | Place |
| R/O | Artist | Song | Jury rank | Votes | Rank | Place |
|---|---|---|---|---|---|---|
| 1 | Ralfs Eilands and Valters Pūce | "Revelation" | 1 | 905 | 8 | 4 |
| 2 | Markus Riva | "Lights On" | 10 | 632 | 10 | 11 |
| 3 | Katrīna Bindere | "Moment and Tomorrow" | 7 | 1,298 | 5 | 7 |
| 4 | Dons | "Pēdējā vēstule" | 2 | 2,426 | 1 | 1 |
| 5 | Samanta Tīna | "Stay" | 5 | 1,302 | 4 | 3 |
| 6 | Niko | "Here I Am Again" | 11 | 1,269 | 6 | 9 |
| 7 | MyRadiantU | "Going All the Way" | 6 | 686 | 9 | 8 |
| 8 | Olga and Līgo | "Saule riet" | 9 | 1,960 | 3 | 6 |
| 9 | Aminata Savadogo | "I Can Breathe" | 3 | 948 | 7 | 5 |
| 10 | Aarzemnieki | "Cake to Bake" | 4 | 2,398 | 2 | 2 |
| 11 | Eirošmits | "If I Could (Get Away)" | 8 | 541 | 11 | 10 |
| 12 | Katrine Lukins | "You Are the Reason" | 12 | 380 | 12 | 12 |

Superfinal – 22 February 2014
| R/O | Artist | Song | Jury rank | Public Vote | | | | Place |
| R/O | Artist | Song | Jury rank | Internet | Televote | Total | Rank | Place |
|---|---|---|---|---|---|---|---|---|
| 1 | Dons | "Pēdējā vēstule" | 1 | 1,551 | 3,830 | 5,381 | 2 | 2 |
| 2 | Samanta Tīna | "Stay" | 3 | 797 | 1,979 | 2,776 | 3 | 3 |
| 3 | Aarzemnieki | "Cake to Bake" | 2 | 1,529 | 3,949 | 5,478 | 1 | 1 |

=== Preparation ===
On 14 March, Aarzemnieki released the official music video for "Cake to Bake", which was directed by Aija Strazdiņa and filmed by Jānis Salms at The Ethnographic Open-Air Museum of Latvia in Riga on 11 March.

=== Promotion ===
Aarzemnieki made several appearances across Europe to specifically promote "Cake to Bake" as the Latvian Eurovision entry. On 26 March, the band performed as guests for the opening of the Gemoss supermarket in Tallinn, Estonia. On 5 April, Aarzemnieki performed during the Eurovision in Concert event which was held at the Melkweg venue in Amsterdam, Netherlands and hosted by Cornald Maas and Sandra Reemer. On 13 April, Aarzemnieki performed during the London Eurovision Party, which was held at the Café de Paris venue in London, United Kingdom and hosted by Nicki French and Paddy O'Connell.

== At Eurovision ==
Aarzemnieki presenting themselves and "Cake to Bake" at the Eurovision Song Contest 2014

All countries except the "Big Five" (France, Germany, Italy, Spain and the United Kingdom), and the host country, are required to qualify from one of two semi-finals in order to compete for the final; the top ten countries from each semi-final progress to the final. The European Broadcasting Union (EBU) split up the competing countries into six different pots based on voting patterns from previous contests, with countries with favourable voting histories put into the same pot. On 20 January 2014, a special allocation draw was held which placed each country into one of the two semi-finals, as well as which half of the show they would perform in. Latvia was placed into the first semi-final, to be held on 6 May 2014, and was scheduled to perform in the first half of the show.

Once all the competing songs for the 2014 contest had been released, the running order for the semi-finals was decided by the shows' producers rather than through another draw, so that similar songs were not placed next to each other. Latvia was set to perform in position 2, following the entry from Armenia and before the entry from Estonia.

The two semi-finals and the final were broadcast in Latvia on LTV1 with all shows featuring commentary by Valters Frīdenbergs and Kārlis Būmeisters. The Latvian spokesperson, who announced the Latvian votes during the final, was Ralfs Eilands.

=== Semi-final ===
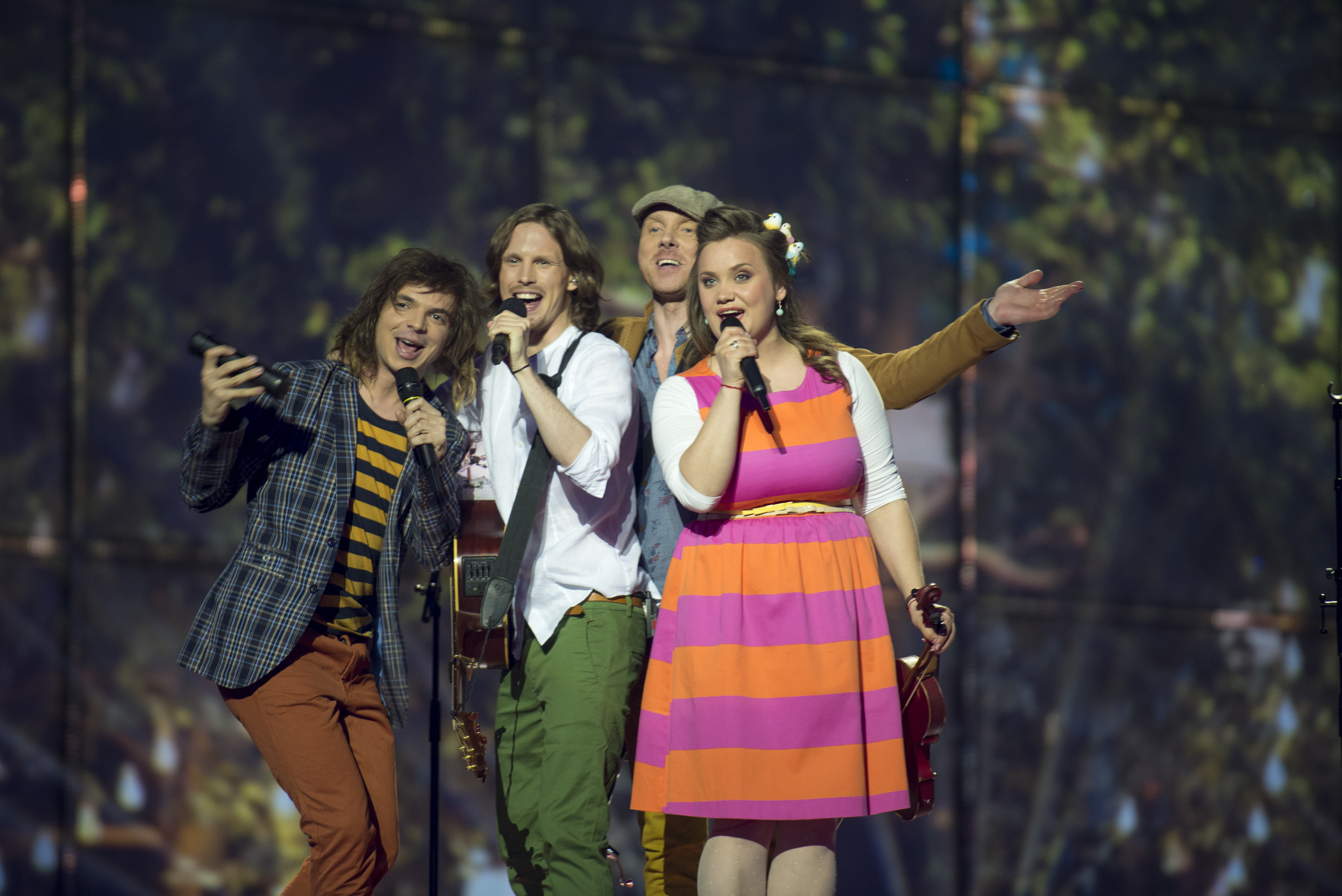
Aarzemnieki during a rehearsal before the first semi-final

Aarzemnieki took part in technical rehearsals on 28 April and 2 May, followed by dress rehearsals on 5 and 6 May. This included the jury show on 5 May where the professional juries of each country watched and voted on the competing entries.

The Latvian performance featured the members of Aarzemnieki playing instruments on stage in casual outfits. The performance began with lead singer Jöran Steinhauer and guitarist as well as composer of "Cake to Bake" Guntis Veilands making their way to the centre of the stage in order to join the other two members of the band. Steinhauer made full use of the stage throughout the performance such as by moving out towards the left hand side of the stage extension. The LED screens displayed a tree lined park image decorated with lights.

At the end of the show, Latvia was not announced among the top 10 entries in the first semi-final and therefore failed to qualify to compete in the final. It was later revealed that Latvia placed thirteenth in the semi-final, receiving a total of 33 points.

=== Voting ===
Voting during the three shows consisted of 50 percent public televoting and 50 percent from a jury deliberation. The jury consisted of five music industry professionals who were citizens of the country they represent, with their names published before the contest to ensure transparency. This jury was asked to judge each contestant based on: vocal capacity; the stage performance; the song's composition and originality; and the overall impression by the act. In addition, no member of a national jury could be related in any way to any of the competing acts in such a way that they cannot vote impartially and independently. The individual rankings of each jury member were released shortly after the grand final.

Following the release of the full split voting by the EBU after the conclusion of the competition, it was revealed that Latvia had placed thirteenth with the public televote and twelfth with the jury vote in the first semi-final. In the public vote, Latvia scored 40 points, while with the jury vote, Latvia scored 27 points.

Below is a breakdown of points awarded to Latvia and awarded by Latvia in the first semi-final and grand final of the contest, and the breakdown of the jury voting and televoting conducted during the two shows:

==== Points awarded to Latvia ====
Points awarded to Latvia (Semi-final 1)
| Score | Country |
|---|---|
| 12 points | |
| 10 points | |
| 8 points | |
| 7 points | Azerbaijan |
| 6 points | Estonia; Iceland |
| 5 points | Belgium |
| 4 points | |
| 3 points | Portugal |
| 2 points | Hungary; San Marino |
| 1 point | Denmark; Sweden |

==== Points awarded by Latvia ====
Points awarded by Latvia (Semi-final 1)
| Score | Country |
|---|---|
| 12 points | Netherlands |
| 10 points | Estonia |
| 8 points | Sweden |
| 7 points | Ukraine |
| 6 points | Armenia |
| 5 points | Iceland |
| 4 points | Russia |
| 3 points | Hungary |
| 2 points | Azerbaijan |
| 1 point | San Marino |

Points awarded by Latvia (Final)
| Score | Country |
|---|---|
| 12 points | Netherlands |
| 10 points | Armenia |
| 8 points | Sweden |
| 7 points | Ukraine |
| 6 points | Austria |
| 5 points | Norway |
| 4 points | Spain |
| 3 points | Finland |
| 2 points | Russia |
| 1 point | Hungary |

==== Detailed voting results ====
The following members comprised the Latvian jury:

- Harijs Zariņš (jury chairperson) – guitarist, composer, lyricist
- Marta Ritova – singer, composer
- Edgars Beļickis – composer, music producer, transcriber
- Igeta Gaiķe – singer, vocal teacher, composer, musical producer
- Kaspars Ansons – composer, transcriber

Detailed voting results from Latvia (Semi-final 1)
| R/O | Country | H. Zariņš | M. Ritova | E. Beļickis | I. Gaiķe | K. Ansons | Jury Rank | Televote Rank | Combined Rank | Points |
|---|---|---|---|---|---|---|---|---|---|---|
| 01 | Armenia | 2 | 1 | 1 | 3 | 2 | 1 | 10 | 5 | 6 |
| 02 | Latvia | | | | | | | | | |
| 03 | Estonia | 7 | 8 | 7 | 5 | 8 | 6 | 2 | 2 | 10 |
| 04 | Sweden | 4 | 4 | 3 | 1 | 5 | 3 | 5 | 3 | 8 |
| 05 | Iceland | 9 | 5 | 5 | 7 | 4 | 5 | 8 | 6 | 5 |
| 06 | Albania | 6 | 9 | 8 | 6 | 9 | 7 | 14 | 11 | |
| 07 | Russia | 12 | 12 | 12 | 11 | 14 | 11 | 4 | 7 | 4 |
| 08 | Azerbaijan | 8 | 2 | 4 | 2 | 6 | 4 | 12 | 9 | 2 |
| 09 | Ukraine | 3 | 7 | 13 | 9 | 7 | 8 | 3 | 4 | 7 |
| 10 | Belgium | 15 | 13 | 10 | 13 | 13 | 13 | 9 | 12 | |
| 11 | Moldova | 13 | 14 | 11 | 14 | 11 | 12 | 15 | 15 | |
| 12 | San Marino | 14 | 10 | 15 | 10 | 15 | 14 | 7 | 10 | 1 |
| 13 | Portugal | 11 | 15 | 14 | 15 | 12 | 15 | 11 | 14 | |
| 14 | Netherlands | 1 | 3 | 2 | 4 | 1 | 2 | 1 | 1 | 12 |
| 15 | Montenegro | 10 | 6 | 6 | 8 | 10 | 9 | 13 | 13 | |
| 16 | Hungary | 5 | 11 | 9 | 12 | 3 | 10 | 6 | 8 | 3 |

Detailed voting results from Latvia (Final)
| R/O | Country | H. Zariņš | M. Ritova | E. Beļickis | I. Gaiķe | K. Ansons | Jury Rank | Televote Rank | Combined Rank | Points |
|---|---|---|---|---|---|---|---|---|---|---|
| 01 | Ukraine | 8 | 10 | 21 | 10 | 12 | 11 | 3 | 4 | 7 |
| 02 | Belarus | 21 | 23 | 18 | 24 | 21 | 22 | 4 | 12 | |
| 03 | Azerbaijan | 7 | 4 | 6 | 3 | 2 | 4 | 21 | 11 | |
| 04 | Iceland | 16 | 8 | 12 | 16 | 11 | 12 | 15 | 13 | |
| 05 | Norway | 4 | 1 | 11 | 4 | 6 | 5 | 11 | 6 | 5 |
| 06 | Romania | 15 | 22 | 10 | 20 | 15 | 17 | 20 | 20 | |
| 07 | Armenia | 2 | 2 | 2 | 5 | 3 | 2 | 6 | 2 | 10 |
| 08 | Montenegro | 18 | 11 | 15 | 9 | 24 | 16 | 26 | 23 | |
| 09 | Poland | 23 | 25 | 25 | 25 | 13 | 24 | 10 | 19 | |
| 10 | Greece | 26 | 26 | 20 | 26 | 26 | 26 | 17 | 24 | |
| 11 | Austria | 17 | 12 | 13 | 11 | 7 | 10 | 5 | 5 | 6 |
| 12 | Germany | 13 | 6 | 16 | 12 | 10 | 9 | 19 | 14 | |
| 13 | Sweden | 5 | 7 | 4 | 1 | 4 | 3 | 7 | 3 | 8 |
| 14 | France | 25 | 21 | 26 | 21 | 16 | 23 | 24 | 26 | |
| 15 | Russia | 22 | 19 | 22 | 17 | 23 | 21 | 1 | 9 | 2 |
| 16 | Italy | 10 | 18 | 23 | 22 | 18 | 19 | 25 | 25 | |
| 17 | Slovenia | 19 | 20 | 17 | 13 | 20 | 18 | 23 | 22 | |
| 18 | Finland | 6 | 5 | 9 | 8 | 5 | 6 | 14 | 8 | 3 |
| 19 | Spain | 3 | 15 | 7 | 7 | 9 | 7 | 12 | 7 | 4 |
| 20 | Switzerland | 20 | 17 | 19 | 15 | 22 | 20 | 9 | 15 | |
| 21 | Hungary | 9 | 14 | 14 | 19 | 8 | 14 | 8 | 10 | 1 |
| 22 | Malta | 11 | 16 | 3 | 6 | 14 | 8 | 22 | 16 | |
| 23 | Denmark | 14 | 13 | 5 | 14 | 19 | 15 | 16 | 17 | |
| 24 | Netherlands | 1 | 3 | 1 | 2 | 1 | 1 | 2 | 1 | 12 |
| 25 | San Marino | 24 | 24 | 24 | 23 | 25 | 25 | 13 | 21 | |
| 26 | United Kingdom | 12 | 9 | 8 | 18 | 17 | 13 | 18 | 18 | |
