= Netherlands in the Eurovision Song Contest 2014 =

- Eurovision Song Contest 2014
- Participating broadcaster: AVROTROS
- Country: Netherlands
- Selection process: Internal selection
- Announcement date: Artist: 25 November 2013; Song: 12 March 2014

Competing entry
- Song: "Calm After the Storm"
- Artist: The Common Linnets
- Songwriters: Ilse DeLange; JB Meijers; Rob Crosby; Matthew Crosby; Jake Etheridge

Placement
- Semi-final result: Qualified (1st, 150 points)
- Final result: 2nd, 238 points

Participation chronology

The Netherlands was represented at the Eurovision Song Contest 2014 with the song "Calm After the Storm", written by Ilse DeLange, JB Meijers, Rob Crosby, Matthew Crosby, and Jake Etheridge, and performed by the Common Linnets. The Dutch participating broadcaster, AVROTROS, internally selected its entry for the contest. In November 2013 the broadcaster announced that it had internally selected them as the performers, with their song first presented to the public in March 2014. The Common Linnets is a duo consisting of DeLange and Waylon, two well-known and popular Dutch artists, and formed by DeLange as a platform for Dutch artists to create country, Americana, and bluegrass music.

In the weeks leading up to the contest, the Netherlands was considered by the bookmakers to be one of the countries most likely to qualify for the final. In the first of two Eurovision semi-finals "Calm After the Storm" came first of the sixteen participating countries, securing its place among the twenty-five other countries in the final. In the Netherlands fifty-fifth Eurovision appearance on 10 May, "Calm After the Storm" finished in second place, receiving 238 points and full marks from eight countries. This was the Netherlands best finish in the contest since 1975.

After the show, the song went on to chart in several European countries, reaching number one in Belgium, Iceland and the Netherlands, as well as reaching the top ten in several other European countries. The group's self-titled début album, released in May 2014, was also a success in the Netherlands and several other European countries. The success of the Common Linnets in the contest was met with wide praise, with many commenting that their triumph was a boost to the musicality and credibility of the contest.

== Background ==
Prior to the 2014 contest, Nederlandse Televisie Stichting (NTS) until 1969, Nederlandse Omroep Stichting (NOS) in 1970–2009, and Televisie Radio Omroep Stichting (TROS) in 2010–2013, had participated in the Eurovision Song Contest representing the Netherlands fifty-four times since NTS's debut in the inaugural contest in 1956. Since then, they have won the contest four times: in 1957 with the song "Net als toen" performed by Corry Brokken; in 1959 with the song "'n Beetje" performed by Teddy Scholten; in 1969 as one of four countries to tie for first place with "De troubadour" performed by Lenny Kuhr; and finally in 1975 with "Ding-a-dong" performed by the group Teach-In. Following the introduction of semi-finals for 2004, the Netherlands had been featured in only two finals. Their least successful result has been last place, which they have achieved on five occasions, most recently in 2011. The Netherlands has also received nul points on two occasions; in 1962 and in 1963.

In January 2014, the Dutch government merged public broadcasters TROS with AVRO to create AVROTROS, who was the one who participated in the 2014 contest. As part of its duties as participating broadcaster, AVROTROS organised the selection of its entry in the Eurovision Song Contest and broadcasts the event in the country. Various methods have been used to select the Dutch entry in the past, such as the Nationaal Songfestival, a live televised national final to choose either the performer, the song or both that would compete at Eurovision. However, internal selections had also been held on occasions, which was the method of selection for the Dutch entry in 2013. An internal selection would again be used in 2014 by AVROTROS.

== Before Eurovision ==
=== Internal selection ===
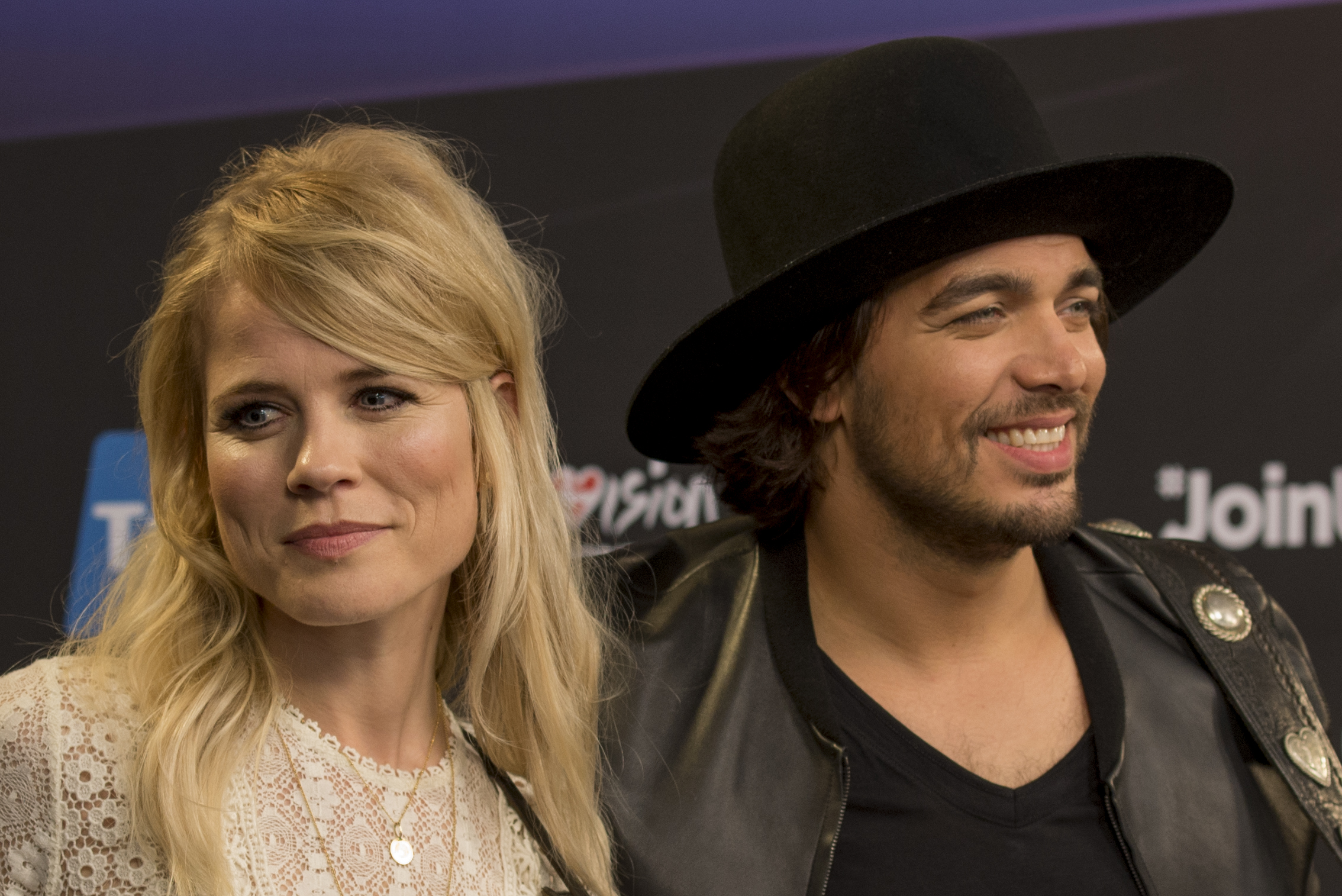
The Common Linnets were internally selected to represent the Netherlands in the Eurovision Song Contest 2014

Following their ninth place in 2013 with the song "Birds" by Anouk which managed to take the Netherlands to the final for the first time in eight years, artists that were rumoured in Dutch media to be in talks with AVROTROS for the Eurovision Song Contest included backing vocalist in 2013 Shirma Rouse who was promoted by Anouk at several events, and DJ Armin van Buuren who stated in June 2013 that he would participate as long as AVROTROS gave him full artistic freedom and abandoned plans of a national final for his entry. On 5 November 2013, the Dutch broadcaster later revealed that an announcement would be made on 25 November 2013. Van Buuren announced on 13 November 2013 that he would not be the Dutch entrant.

On 5 November 2013, Dutch media reported that AVROTROS had selected singers Ilse DeLange and Waylon to represent the Netherlands at the 2014 contest. DeLange and Waylon were confirmed as the Dutch entrants on 25 November 2013 under the name the Common Linnets during a press conference that took place at the Wisseloord Studios in Hilversum. Waylon was the runner-up in the first series of the reality singing competition Holland's Got Talent, and had previously attempted to represent the Netherlands in the Eurovision Song Contest in 2005 in a duet with singer Rachel Kramer, failing to qualify from the semi-finals of the national final with the song "Leven als een beest". Having known each other since adolescence, the idea of participating at Eurovision as a duo was formed while working on material for an album in Nashville as a "side project". The duo's name, taken from a songbird commonly found in rural areas of the Netherlands, can also be a colloquial term for "homely country folk."

On 4 March 2014, the duo revealed during the Dutch talk show De Wereld Draait Door that "Calm After the Storm" would be their Eurovision entry. The song was written by JB Meijers, Rob Crosby, Matthew Crosby, Jake Etheridge and DeLange herself. On 12 March 2014, an acoustic version of the song was presented to the public during De Wereld Draait Door, while the official version of the song was premiered on the same day during the NPO Radio 2 programme Gouden Uren, hosted by Daniël Dekker. The official video for the song directed by Paul Bellaart was released on 17 March.

=== Promotion ===
A small European promotional tour was planned for The Common Linnets, visiting smaller countries such as San Marino and Malta, as well as neighbouring Belgium. However it was later decided that the group would focus their attention before Eurovision on media in the Netherlands, promoting their self-titled début album and DeLange's theatre tour, and would then turn their focus to international promotion on their arrival in Denmark. This method proved successful for "Calm After the Storm" in the Netherlands, having sold over 10,000 copies by April 2014 and earning the song a gold record.

==== Eurovision in Concert 2014 ====
Since 2009, Eurovision in Concert has been held in the Netherlands, and has become the largest gathering of Eurovision artists outside of the concert itself. Created by a group of Dutch Eurovision fans, the event was designed to keep the spirit in Eurovision alive in the Netherlands after several disappointing results for the Netherlands and declining interest in the contest in the country.

The 2014 event, attended by 1,500 Eurovision fans, was held on 5 April 2014 in the Melkweg music venue in Amsterdam. It featured 25 of the competing countries from the 2014 Eurovision, including the Dutch act The Common Linnets. The event was hosted by singer Sandra Reemer, former Dutch Eurovision representative in 1972, 1976, and 1979, and Dutch Eurovision commentator Cornald Maas. Special guests included Emmelie de Forest, who won Eurovision for Denmark in 2013, and Frizzle Sizzle, who represented the Netherlands in 1986. Jan Lagermand Lundme, the Head of Show for the 2014 contest, also made a short presentation where the press were shown how the stage would look, as well as a presentation of the postcards for some of the participating countries.

== At Eurovision ==
The Common Linnets – Ilse DeLange and Waylon – introducing themselves and their song "Calm After the Storm".

The Eurovision Song Contest 2014 took place at B&W Hallerne in Copenhagen, Denmark. It consisted of two semi-finals held on 6 and 8 May, respectively, and the grand final on 10 May 2014. All countries except the "Big Five" (France, Germany, Italy, Spain, and the United Kingdom) and the host country, were required to qualify from one of two semi-finals in order to compete for the final; the top ten countries from each semi-final progressed to the final. The European Broadcasting Union (EBU) split up the competing countries into six different pots based on voting patterns from previous contests, with countries with favourable voting histories put into the same pot. On 20 January 2014, a special allocation draw was held which placed each country into one of the two semi-finals, as well as which half of the show they would perform in. The Netherlands was placed into the first semi-final, to be held on 6 May 2014, and was scheduled to perform in the second half of the show.

Once all the competing songs for the 2014 contest had been released, the running order for the semi-finals was decided by the show's producers rather than through another draw, so that similar songs were not placed next to each other. The Netherlands was set to perform in position 14, after the entry from Portugal and before the entry from Montenegro.

All three shows were broadcast by Nederland 1 and satellite channel BVN, with commentary provided by Cornald Maas and Jan Smit. AVROTROS appointed Tim Douwsma as its spokesperson to announce the Dutch votes during the final.

=== Semi-final ===
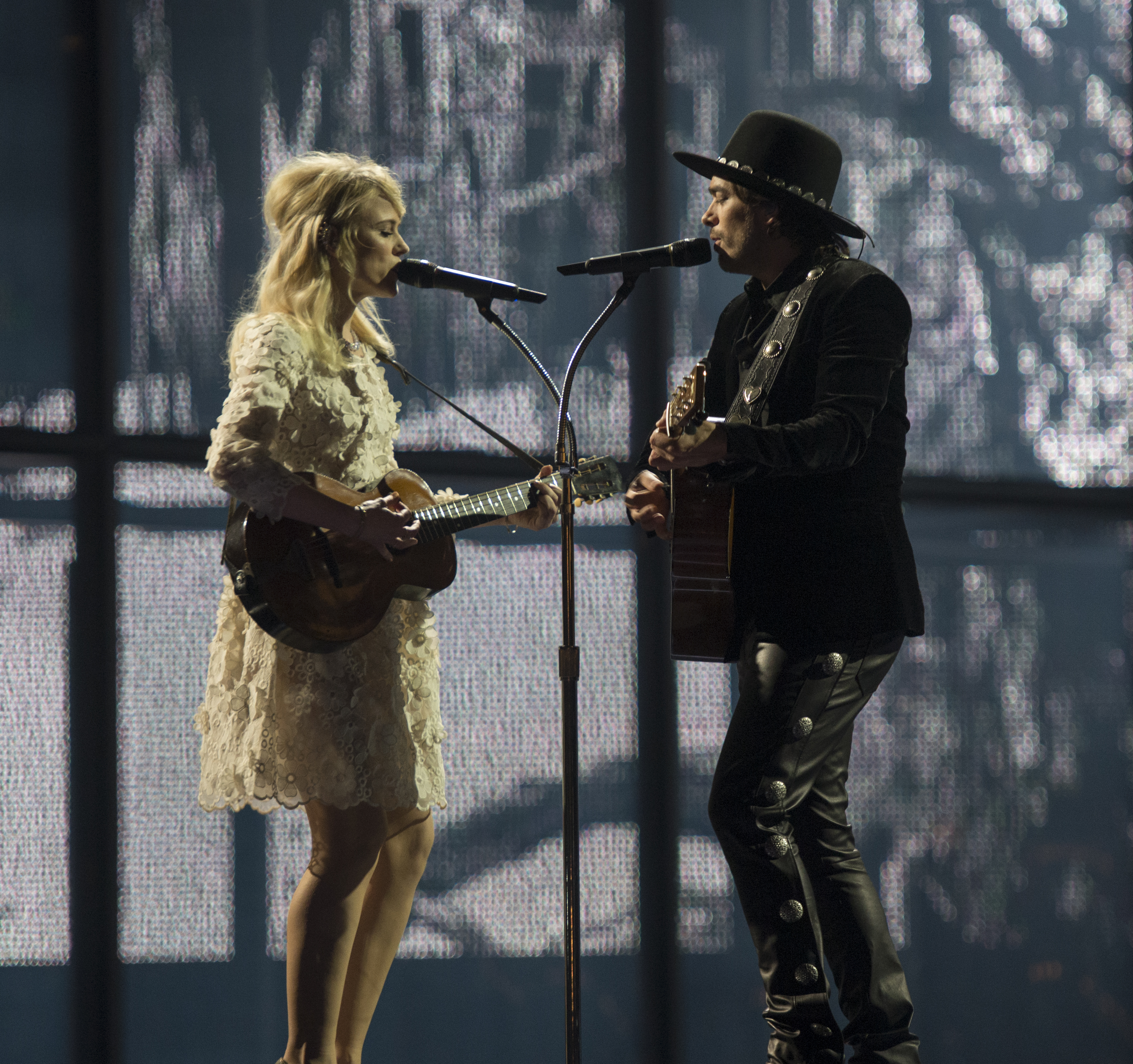
The Common Linnets at a dress rehearsal for the first semi-final

The Common Linnets took part in technical rehearsals on 29 April and 2 May, followed by dress rehearsals on 5 and 6 May. This included the jury final where professional juries of each country, responsible for 50 percent of each country's vote, watched and voted on the competing entries.

The Dutch stage show featured DeLange and Waylon using a specially designed microphone stand to allow them to face each other, both playing guitars, while a bassist, a drummer and a cellist performed in the background. Low lighting was used throughout the performance, with large swooping camera shots at the beginning and end of the song implemented along with several close-ups during the rest of the performance. On the floor of the stage LED screens simulated road markings, while further screens on the background showed a rainy forest scene, transforming into a dry forest scene towards the end of the song's performance.

At the end of the show, the Netherlands was announced as having finished in the top ten and subsequently qualifying for the grand final. It was later revealed that the Netherlands won the semi-final, receiving a total of 150 points.

=== Final ===
Shortly after the first semi-final, a winner's press conference was held for the ten qualifying countries. As part of this press conference, the qualifying artists took part in a draw to determine which half of the grand final they would subsequently participate in. This draw was done in the order the countries were announced during the semi-final. The Netherlands was drawn to compete in the second half. Following the second semi-final, where the remaining ten qualifiers for the final were decided, the show's producers decided upon the running order of the final, as they had done for the semi-finals. The Netherlands were subsequently placed to perform in position 24, following the entry from Denmark and before the entry from San Marino. Following their qualification, the Netherlands was considered to be a major competitor for the Eurovision title, with bookmakers on the day of the final considering the Netherlands to be the third most likely country to win the competition.

The Common Linnets once again took part in dress rehearsals on 9 and 10 May before the final, including the jury final where the professional juries cast their final votes before the live show. After a short technical delay following the Danish entry, the group performed a repeat of their semi-final performance during the final, and finished in second place at the end of the voting behind the winning entry from Austria, receiving a total of 238 points and having received 12 points, the maximum number of points a country can give to another, from eight countries. The broadcast of the final was watched by 5.1 million people in the Netherlands, representing a 65 percent market share, while during the Dutch performance a peak of 6.2 million people was registered.

==== Marcel Bezençon Awards ====
The Marcel Bezençon Awards, first awarded during the 2002, are awards honouring the best competing songs in the final each year. Named after the creator of the annual contest, Marcel Bezençon, the awards are divided into three categories: the Press Award, given to the best entry as voted on by the accredited media and press during the event; the Artistic Award, presented to the best artist as voted on by the shows' commentators; and the Composer Award, given to the best and most original composition as voted by the participating composers. The Netherlands was voted the winners of two of the awards: The Common Linnets received the Artistic Award; and DeLange, Rob and Matthew Crosby, Meijers, and Etheridge received the Composer Award for "Calm After the Storm". DeLange and Waylon were in attendance at the award ceremony to receive the awards.

=== Voting ===
Voting during the three shows consisted of 50 percent public televoting and 50 percent from a jury deliberation. The jury consisted of five music industry professionals who were citizens of the country they represent, with their names published before the contest to ensure transparency. This jury was asked to judge each contestant based on: vocal capacity; the stage performance; the song's composition and originality; and the overall impression by the act. In addition, no member of a national jury could be related in any way to any of the competing acts in such a way that they cannot vote impartially and independently. The individual rankings of each jury member were released shortly after the grand final.

Below is a breakdown of points awarded to and from the Netherlands in the first semi-final and grand final of the contest, and the breakdown of the jury voting and televoting conducted during the two shows:

==== Points awarded to the Netherlands ====
Points awarded to the Netherlands (Semi-final 1)
Score	Country
12 points	Denmark; Estonia; Hungary; Iceland; Latvia; Portugal; San Marino; Sweden
10 points	Armenia; Belgium; France
8 points	
7 points	Spain; Ukraine
6 points	
5 points	
4 points	
3 points	Azerbaijan
2 points	Albania; Moldova; Russia
1 point	Montenegro

Points awarded to the Netherlands (Final)
Score	Country
12 points	Estonia; Germany; Hungary; Iceland; Latvia; Lithuania; Norway; Poland
10 points	Austria; Denmark; Ireland; Portugal; Slovenia; Sweden; Switzerland
8 points	Belgium; Finland; France; Greece; United Kingdom
7 points	Macedonia; Spain
6 points	
5 points	
4 points	Armenia; Italy
3 points	Romania; Russia
2 points	Belarus; San Marino
1 point	

==== Points awarded by the Netherlands ====
Points awarded by the Netherlands (Semi-final 1)
Score	Country
12 points	Armenia
10 points	Hungary
8 points	Sweden
7 points	Iceland
6 points	Montenegro
5 points	Ukraine
4 points	Azerbaijan
3 points	Belgium
2 points	Portugal
1 point	Albania

Points awarded by the Netherlands (Final)
Score	Country
12 points	Austria
10 points	Norway
8 points	Sweden
7 points	Armenia
6 points	Iceland
5 points	Malta
4 points	Hungary
3 points	Switzerland
2 points	Finland
1 point	Denmark

==== Detailed voting results ====
The following members comprised the Dutch jury:

- Antonius van de Berkt (jury chairperson) – record company CEO
- Freek Bartels – singer, musical actor
- Marleen Sahupala-van den Broek (Marlayne) – singer, television host, represented the Netherlands in the 1999 Contest
- Ruth Jacott – singer, represented the Netherlands in the 1993 Contest
- Sander Lantinga – radio DJ 3FM

Detailed voting results from the Netherlands (Semi-final 1)
R/O	Country	A. van de Berkt	F. Bartels	Marlayne	R. Jacott	S. Lantinga	Jury Rank	Televote Rank	Combined Rank	Points
01	Armenia	2	5	6	7	2	4	1	1	12
02	Latvia	15	14	15	15	13	15	8	13	
03	Estonia	6	10	5	5	11	8	14	12	
04	Sweden	1	2	2	1	4	2	3	3	8
05	Iceland	5	1	1	2	1	1	4	4	7
06	Albania	8	7	3	8	8	7	12	10	1
07	Russia	9	8	9	11	9	10	11	11	
08	Azerbaijan	10	4	8	6	5	6	10	7	4
09	Ukraine	7	11	12	9	7	9	7	6	5
10	Belgium	13	13	13	12	10	12	5	8	3
11	Moldova	14	12	14	13	15	14	15	15	
12	San Marino	11	9	11	14	12	11	13	14	
13	Portugal	12	15	10	10	14	13	6	9	2
14	Netherlands									
15	Montenegro	3	6	7	3	6	5	9	5	6
16	Hungary	4	3	4	4	3	3	2	2	10

Detailed voting results from the Netherlands (Final)
R/O	Country	A. van de Berkt	F. Bartels	Marlayne	R. Jacott	S. Lantinga	Jury Rank	Televote Rank	Combined Rank	Points
01	Ukraine	10	12	12	14	17	13	15	14	
02	Belarus	25	20	16	19	24	20	18	21	
03	Azerbaijan	11	4	8	10	11	9	20	15	
04	Iceland	7	8	2	4	10	5	6	5	6
05	Norway	3	1	3	5	1	2	4	2	10
06	Romania	9	24	20	7	16	16	16	17	
07	Armenia	4	9	10	8	5	7	3	4	7
08	Montenegro	1	13	9	3	4	4	22	12	
09	Poland	24	25	22	25	25	25	2	13	
10	Greece	22	23	23	22	23	24	11	19	
11	Austria	5	3	1	1	2	1	1	1	12
12	Germany	19	17	18	16	18	18	17	20	
13	Sweden	2	6	4	2	7	3	5	3	8
14	France	18	19	24	24	21	22	23	24	
15	Russia	17	16	15	20	13	17	14	16	
16	Italy	20	22	25	23	22	23	25	25	
17	Slovenia	21	18	17	18	15	19	24	23	
18	Finland	6	5	6	9	12	8	13	9	2
19	Spain	16	15	11	6	9	12	12	11	
20	Switzerland	8	14	14	11	8	11	8	8	3
21	Hungary	12	10	7	12	6	10	7	7	4
22	Malta	13	2	5	13	3	6	10	6	5
23	Denmark	14	7	13	17	19	14	9	10	1
24	Netherlands									
25	San Marino	23	21	21	21	20	21	21	22	
26	United Kingdom	15	11	19	15	14	15	19	18	

== After Eurovision ==
In a contest that had been referred to as "gimmicky", the success of "Calm After the Storm" received wide praise in the media, with some suggesting that the song's triumph had provided a boost to the musicality and credibility of the contest. Following the contest, the song went on to become a success across Europe, featuring in the top three in iTunes download charts in sixteen different countries. "Calm After the Storm" also went on to reach the top ten in charts in sixteen countries, including reaching number one in Belgium, Iceland and the Netherlands. In many cases the song out-performed the contest's winning song, "Rise Like a Phoenix". In the UK Singles Chart "Calm After the Storm" charted at number nine, becoming only the fourth non-winning Eurovision song to chart in the top ten. The group's début album The Common Linnets was also a success, charting in several European countries and entering the top ten in the Netherlands and Austria.

The Common Linnets capitalised on their Eurovision success with several events across Europe, including in Belgium, Germany and a secret concert in Vienna, Austria. However some controversy erupted when Waylon was absent from several scheduled events in May 2014, as well as inactivity from his official Twitter account for over a week. After becoming active again on social media, he expressed bemusement over the media frenzy over his absence. He also stated that The Common Linnets was always DeLange's vehicle and that his continuing participation in the group was always agreed to be in a varying capacity, and that he wished to focus on his solo career, including the release of his new album, which had already been delayed. Waylon stepped down from the group after their performance at the Tuckerville Festival in Enschede.

In July 2014 it was announced that The Common Linnets would embark on a European tour. The tour which started on 5 October 2014 at the TivoliVredenburg, in Utrecht, Netherlands; continued to visit various European countries including, Austria, Belgium, Germany, Switzerland, and the United Kingdom. The tour concluded on 2 November 2014 at the 013 music venue, in the Dutch city of Tilburg.
