= Iceland in the Eurovision Song Contest 2014 =

- Eurovision Song Contest 2014
- Participating broadcaster: Ríkisútvarpið (RÚV)
- Country: Iceland
- Selection process: Söngvakeppnin 2014
- Selection date: 15 February 2014

Competing entry
- Song: "No Prejudice"
- Artist: Pollapönk
- Songwriters: Heiðar Örn Kristjánsson; Haraldur Freyr Gíslason; John Grant

Placement
- Semi-final result: Qualified (8th, 61 points)
- Final result: 15th, 58 points

Participation chronology

Iceland was represented at the Eurovision Song Contest 2014 with the song "No Prejudice" written by Heiðar Örn Kristjánsson, Haraldur F. Gíslason and John Grant. The song was performed by the band Pollapönk. The Icelandic entry for the 2014 contest in Copenhagen, Denmark was selected through the national final Söngvakeppnin 2014, organised by the Icelandic broadcaster Ríkisútvarpið (RÚV). The selection consisted of two semi-finals and a final, held on 1, 8 and 15 February 2014, respectively. Five songs competed in each semi-final with the top two as selected by a public televote alongside two jury wildcards advancing to the final. In the final, the winner was selected over two rounds of voting: the first involved a 50/50 combination of jury voting and public televoting, which reduced the six competing entries to two superfinalists and the second round selected the winner exclusively through public televoting. "No Prejudice" performed by Pollapönk emerged as the winner after gaining the most public votes.

Iceland was drawn to compete in the first semi-final of the Eurovision Song Contest which took place on 6 May 2014. Performing during the show in position 5, "No Prejudice" was announced among the top 10 entries of the first semi-final and therefore qualified to compete in the final on 10 May. It was later revealed that the Iceland placed eighth out of the 16 participating countries in the semi-final with 61 points. In the final, Iceland performed in position 4 and placed fifteenth out of the 26 participating countries, scoring 58 points.

== Background ==
Prior to the 2014 contest, Iceland had participated in the Eurovision Song Contest twenty-six times since its first entry in 1986. Iceland's best placing in the contest to this point was second, which it achieved on two occasions: in 1999 with the song "All Out of Luck" performed by Selma and in 2009 with the song "Is It True?" performed by Yohanna. Since the introduction of a semi-final to the format of the Eurovision Song Contest in 2004, Iceland has, to this point, only failed to qualify to the final three times. In 2013, Iceland managed to qualify to the final and placed seventeenth with the song "Ég á líf" performed by Eythor Ingi.

The Icelandic national broadcaster, Ríkisútvarpið (RÚV), broadcasts the event within Iceland and organises the selection process for the nation's entry. RÚV confirmed their intentions to participate at the 2014 Eurovision Song Contest on 15 July 2013. Since 2006, Iceland has used a national final to select their entry for the Eurovision Song Contest, a method that continued for their 2014 participation.

== Before Eurovision ==
=== Söngvakeppnin 2014 ===
Söngvakeppnin 2014 was the national final format developed by RÚV in order to select Iceland's entry for the Eurovision Song Contest 2014. The three shows in the competition were hosted by Ragnhildur Steinunn Jónsdóttir and Guðrún Dís Emilsdóttir and all took place in Reykjavík: the two semi-finals were held at the RÚV studios and the final took place at the Háskólabíó venue. The semi-finals and final were broadcast on RÚV and online at the broadcaster's official website ruv.is. The final was also broadcast via radio on Rás 2 and streamed online at the Eurovision Song Contest official website eurovision.tv.

==== Format ====
Ten songs in total competed in Söngvakeppnin 2014 where the winner was determined after two semi-finals and a final. Five songs competed in each semi-final on 1 and 8 February 2014. The top two songs from each semi-final, as determined by public televoting qualified to the final which took place on 15 February 2014. Two wildcard acts were selected by a jury for the final out of the remaining non-qualifying acts from both semi-finals. The winning entry in the final was determined over two rounds of voting: the first to select the top two via 50/50 public televoting and jury voting and the second to determine the winner with 100% televoting. All songs were required to be performed in Icelandic during the semi-final and first round of the final portion of the competition. In the second round of the final, the song was required to be performed in the language that the artist intended to perform in at the Eurovision Song Contest in Copenhagen. In addition to selecting the Icelandic entry for Eurovision, a monetary prize of 1 million Icelandic króna was awarded to the songwriters responsible for the winning entry.

==== Competing entries ====
On 3 September 2013, RÚV opened the submission period for interested songwriters to submit their entries until the deadline on 7 October 2014, which was later extended by one week to 14 October 2013. Songwriters were required to be Icelandic or possess Icelandic citizenship and had the right to submit up to two entries. However, exceptions would be made for minor collaborations with foreign songwriters as long as two-thirds of the composition and half of the lyrics are by Icelandic composers/lyricists. At the close of the submission deadline, 297 entries were received. A selection committee was formed in order to select the top ten entries. The ten competing artists and songs were revealed by the broadcaster during the television programme Kastljós on 17 December 2013. Among the competing artists was previous Icelandic Eurovision entrant Vignir Snær Vigfússon, who represented Iceland in 2011 as part of Sjonni's Friends. RÚV presented the songs on 27 January and 3 February 2014 during the Rás 2 radio programmes Morgunútvarpinu and Virkum morgnum. Both entries that later qualified to the second round of the final entered English versions of their songs for the competition.

Artist	Song		Songwriter(s)
Artist	Icelandic title	English title	Songwriter(s)
Ásdís María Viðarsdóttir	"Amor"	—N/a	Haukur Johnson
F.U.N.K.	"Þangað til ég dey"	—N/a	Franz Ploder Ottósson, Pétur Finnbogason, Lárus Örn Arnarsson
Gissur Páll Gissurarson	"Von"	—N/a	Jóhann Helgason
Greta Mjöll Samúelsdóttir	"Eftir eitt lag"	—N/a	Ásta Björg Björgvinsdóttir, Bergrún Íris Sævarsdóttir
Guðbjörg Magnúsdóttir	"Aðeins ætluð þér"	—N/a	María Björk Sverrisdóttir, Marcus Frenell
Guðrún Árný Karlsdóttir	"Til þín"	—N/a	Guðrún Eva Mínervudóttir
Pollapönk	"Enga fordóma"	"No Prejudice"	Heiðar Örn Kristjánsson, Haraldur Freyr Gíslason
Sigríður Eyrún Friðriksdóttir	"Lífið kviknar á ný"	"Up and Away"	Karl Olgeir Olgeirsson, Sigríður Eyrún Friðriksdóttir
Sverrir Bergmann	"Dönsum burtu blús"	—N/a	Pálmi Ragnar Ásgeirsson, Ásgeir Orri Ásgeirsson, Sæþór Kristjánsson
Vignir Snær Vigfússon	"Elsku þú"	—N/a	Vignir Snær Vigfússon, Þórunn Erna Clausen

==== Semi-finals ====
The two semi-finals took place on 1 and 8 February 2014. In each semi-final five acts presented their entries, and the top two entries voted upon solely by public televoting proceeded to the final. "Amor" performed by Ásdís María Viðarsdóttir and "Lífið kviknar á ný" performed by Sigríður Eyrún Friðriksdóttir were awarded the jury wildcards and also proceeded to the final.

Semi-final 1 – 1 February 2014
R/O	Artist	Song	Result
1	Sverrir Bergmann	"Dönsum burtu blús"	—N/a
2	Greta Mjöll Samúelsdóttir	"Eftir eitt lag"	Advanced
3	Gissur Páll Gissurarson	"Von"	Advanced
4	Ásdís María Viðarsdóttir	"Amor"	Wildcard
5	Vignir Snær Vigfússon	"Elsku þú"	—N/a

Semi-final 2 – 8 February 2014
R/O	Artist	Song	Result
1	Sigríður Eyrún Friðriksdóttir	"Lífið kviknar á ný"	Wildcard
2	Guðrún Árný Karlsdóttir	"Til þín"	—N/a
3	F.U.N.K.	"Þangað til ég dey"	Advanced
4	Guðbjörg Magnúsdóttir	"Aðeins ætluð þér"	—N/a
5	Pollapönk	"Enga fordóma"	Advanced

==== Final ====
The final took place on 2 February 2013 where the six entries that qualified from the preceding two semi-finals competed. In the first round of voting, votes from a jury panel (50%) and public televoting (50%) determined the top two entries to advanced to a second round of voting, the superfinal: "Lífið kviknar á ný" performed by Sigríður Eyrún Friðriksdóttir and "Enga fordóma" performed by Pollapönk. In the semi-finals and first round of the final, all competing entries were required to be performed in Icelandic; however, entries competing in the superfinal were required to be presented in the language they would compete with in the Eurovision Song Contest. Sigríður Eyrún Friðriksdóttir presented her entry in English ("Up and Away"), while Pollapönk presented their entry in a mix of Icelandic and English ("No Prejudice"). In the second round, the winner, "No Prejudice" performed by Pollapönk, was determined solely by televoting. "Enga fordóma"/"No Prejudice" won both the public televote in both rounds and the jury vote in the first round. In addition to the performances of the competing artists, the show featured guest appearances by Unnur Eggertsdóttir, Hrafnhildur Halldórsdóttir, Felix Bergsson and Eurovision Song Contest 2000 winner Olsen Brothers, which won for Denmark with the song "Fly on the Wings of Love".

Final – 15 February 2014
R/O	Artist	Song	Place
1	F.U.N.K.	"Þangað til ég dey"	3
2	Ásdís María Viðarsdóttir	"Amor"	5–6
3	Sigríður Eyrún Friðriksdóttir	"Lífið kviknar á ný"	2
4	Gissur Páll Gissurarson	"Von"	5–6
5	Greta Mjöll Samúelsdóttir	"Eftir eitt lag"	3
6	Pollapönk	"Enga fordóma"	1

Superfinal – 15 February 2014
R/O	Artist	Song	Place
1	Sigríður Eyrún Friðriksdóttir	"Up and Away"	2
2	Pollapönk	"No Prejudice"	1

=== Preparation ===
On 16 March 2014, it was announced that "No Prejudice" would be performed exclusively in English at the Eurovision Song Contest. The official music video for the song, directed by Elvar Gunnarsson, was released on the same day.

== At Eurovision ==
Pollapönk presenting their entry

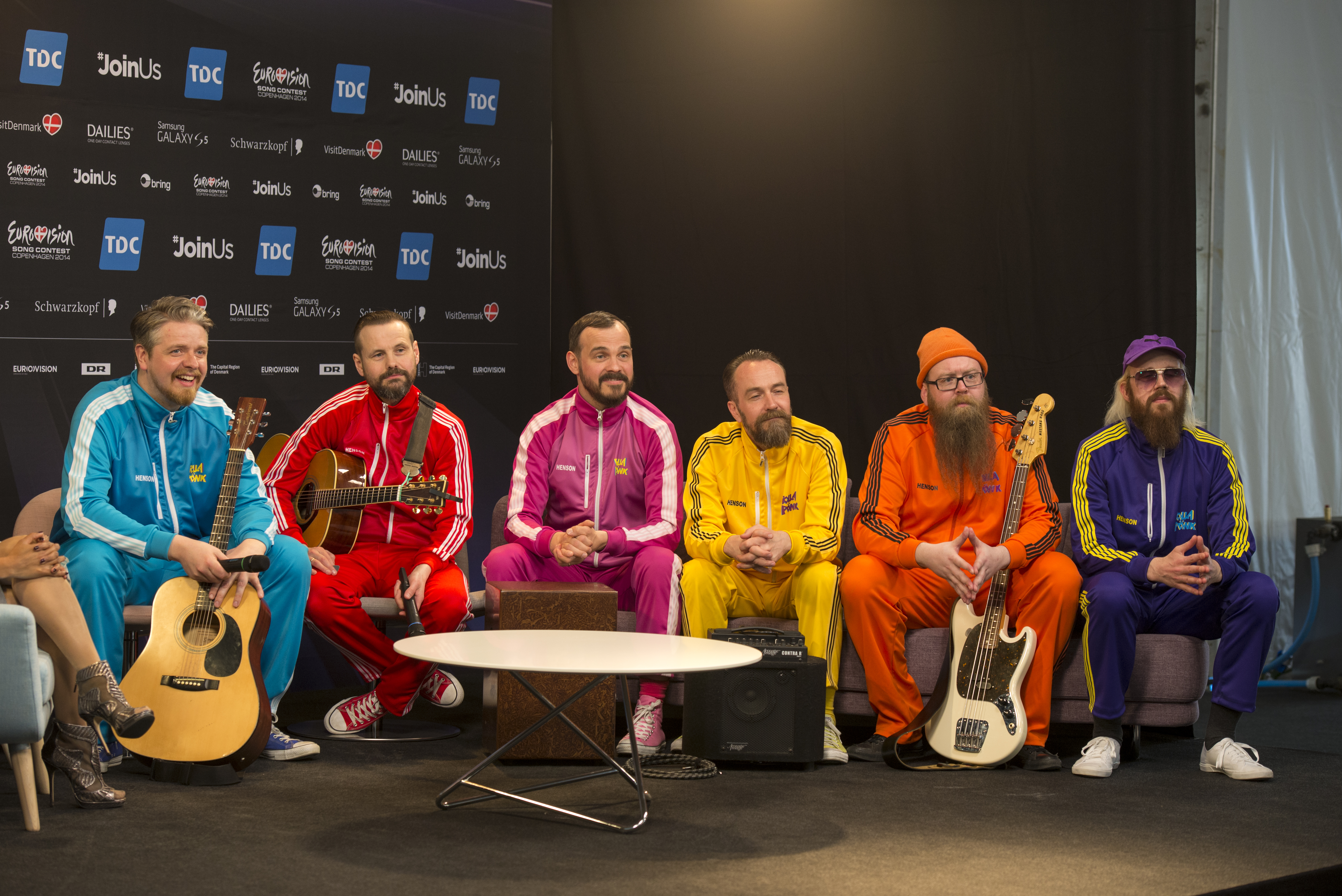
Pollapönk during a press meet and greet

According to Eurovision rules, all nations with the exceptions of the host country and the "Big Five" (France, Germany, Italy, Spain and the United Kingdom) are required to qualify from one of two semi-finals in order to compete for the final; the top ten countries from each semi-final progress to the final. The European Broadcasting Union (EBU) split up the competing countries into six different pots based on voting patterns from previous contests, with countries with favourable voting histories put into the same pot. On 20 January 2014, a special allocation draw was held which placed each country into one of the two semi-finals, as well as which half of the show they would perform in. Iceland was placed into the first semi-final, to be held on 6 May 2014, and was scheduled to perform in the first half of the show.

Once all the competing songs for the 2014 contest had been released, the running order for the semi-finals was decided by the shows' producers rather than through another draw, so that similar songs were not placed next to each other. Iceland was set to perform in position 5, following the entry from Sweden and before the entry from Albania.

The two semi-finals and the final were broadcast in Iceland on RÚV and Rás 2 with commentary by Felix Bergsson. The Icelandic spokesperson, who announced the Icelandic votes during the final, was Benedict Valsson.

=== Semi-final ===
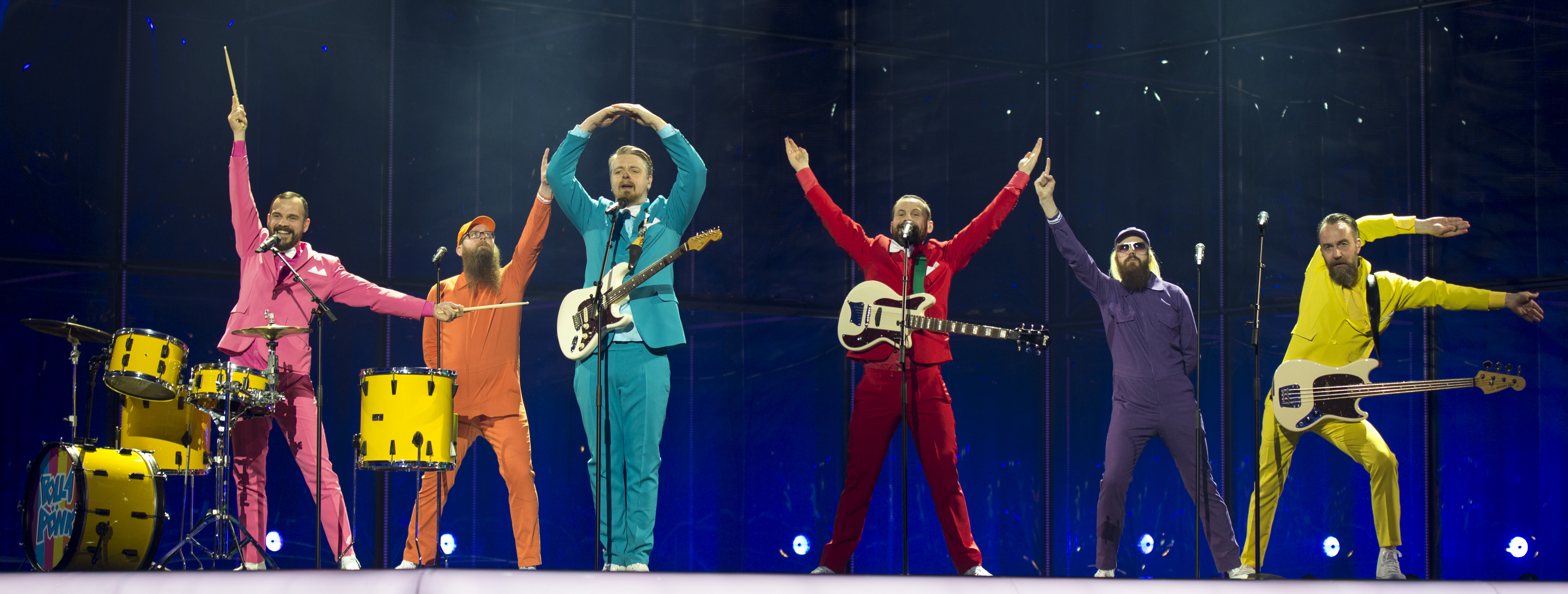
Pollapönk during a rehearsal before the first semi-final

Pollapönk took part in technical rehearsals on 28 April and 2 May, followed by dress rehearsals on 5 and 6 May. This included the jury show on 5 May where the professional juries of each country watched and voted on the competing entries.

The Icelandic performance featured the members of Pollapönk dressed in pink, blue, yellow and red outfits, joined on stage in a band set-up by two backing vocalists dressed in orange and purple outfits. The LED screens transitioned between bright white and red colours and cubes, with bright block colours appearing on the stage floor. The performance was concluded with the members of the band using their bodies to spell the word "LOVE" with the third line of the E being the neck of a guitar. The backing vocalists that joined Pollapönk were Óttarr Proppé, a Bright Future party politician and member of the Icelandic parliament, and Snæbjörn Ragnarsson, bassist from Icelandic Viking metal band Skálmöld.

At the end of the show, Iceland was announced as having finished in the top 10 and subsequently qualifying for the grand final. It was later revealed that Iceland placed eighth in the semi-final, receiving a total of 61 points.

=== Final ===
Shortly after the first semi-final, a winners' press conference was held for the ten qualifying countries. As part of this press conference, the qualifying artists took part in a draw to determine which half of the grand final they would subsequently participate in. This draw was done in the order the countries were announced during the semi-final. Iceland was drawn to compete in the first half. Following this draw, the shows' producers decided upon the running order of the final, as they had done for the semi-finals. Iceland was subsequently placed to perform in position 4, following the entry from Azerbaijan and before the entry from Norway.

Pollapönk once again took part in dress rehearsals on 9 and 10 May before the final, including the jury final where the professional juries cast their final votes before the live show. Pollapönk performed a repeat of their semi-final performance during the final on 10 May. Iceland placed fifteenth in the final, scoring 58 points.

=== Voting ===
Voting during the three shows consisted of 50 percent public televoting and 50 percent from a jury deliberation. The jury consisted of five music industry professionals who were citizens of the country they represent, with their names published before the contest to ensure transparency. This jury was asked to judge each contestant based on: vocal capacity; the stage performance; the song's composition and originality; and the overall impression by the act. In addition, no member of a national jury could be related in any way to any of the competing acts in such a way that they cannot vote impartially and independently. The individual rankings of each jury member were released shortly after the grand final.

Following the release of the full split voting by the EBU after the conclusion of the competition, it was revealed that Iceland had placed twelfth with the public televote and fifteenth with the jury vote in the final. In the public vote, Iceland scored 46 points, while with the jury vote, Iceland scored 59 points. In the first semi-final, Iceland placed ninth with the public televote with 50 points and eighth with the jury vote, scoring 68 points.

Below is a breakdown of points awarded to Iceland and awarded by Iceland in the first semi-final and grand final of the contest, and the breakdown of the jury voting and televoting conducted during the two shows:

==== Points awarded to Iceland ====
Points awarded to Iceland (Semi-final 1)
Score	Country
12 points	
10 points	
8 points	Denmark; France
7 points	Netherlands; San Marino; Sweden
6 points	Hungary
5 points	Latvia
4 points	Belgium
3 points	Spain; Ukraine
2 points	Estonia
1 point	Portugal

Points awarded to Iceland (Final)
Score	Country
12 points	
10 points	
8 points	San Marino
7 points	France; Italy
6 points	Netherlands; Norway
5 points	Denmark; Hungary
4 points	Sweden; United Kingdom
3 points	
2 points	Austria; Germany
1 point	Russia; Spain

==== Points awarded by Iceland ====
Points awarded by Iceland (Semi-final 1)
Score	Country
12 points	Netherlands
10 points	Sweden
8 points	Hungary
7 points	Ukraine
6 points	Latvia
5 points	Estonia
4 points	San Marino
3 points	Armenia
2 points	Russia
1 point	Azerbaijan

Points awarded by Iceland (Final)
Score	Country
12 points	Netherlands
10 points	Austria
8 points	Denmark
7 points	Sweden
6 points	Hungary
5 points	Finland
4 points	United Kingdom
3 points	Poland
2 points	Armenia
1 point	Norway

==== Detailed voting results ====
The following members comprised the Icelandic jury:

- Hildur Þórhallsdóttir (jury chairperson) – singer, musician, music teacher
- Jóhanna Guðrún Jónsdóttir (Yohanna) – performer, singer, songwriter, represented Iceland in 2009
- Kjartan Guðbergsson – sound engineer
- Fridrik Jonsson – singer, songwriter, television host
- Ragnheiður Gröndal – singer, songwriter, lyricist, pianist, vocal teacher

Detailed voting results from Iceland (Semi-final 1)
R/O	Country	H. Þórhallsdóttir	Yohanna	K. Guðbergsson	F. Jonsson	R. Gröndal	Jury Rank	Televote Rank	Combined Rank	Points
01	Armenia	5	10	10	15	10	11	7	8	3
02	Latvia	6	12	15	11	11	12	4	5	6
03	Estonia	12	8	7	6	9	7	9	6	5
04	Sweden	1	1	2	1	1	1	2	2	10
05	Iceland									
06	Albania	8	4	1	13	4	6	13	12	
07	Russia	14	6	11	10	6	10	8	9	2
08	Azerbaijan	2	7	12	4	3	4	14	10	1
09	Ukraine	11	9	9	7	7	8	6	4	7
10	Belgium	13	13	13	9	12	14	11	14	
11	Moldova	9	15	8	14	13	13	15	15	
12	San Marino	10	5	4	5	5	5	12	7	4
13	Portugal	15	14	14	12	14	15	5	13	
14	Netherlands	3	3	6	3	2	2	1	1	12
15	Montenegro	7	11	5	8	15	9	10	11	
16	Hungary	4	2	3	2	8	3	3	3	8

Detailed voting results from Iceland (Final)
R/O	Country	H. Þórhallsdóttir	Yohanna	K. Guðbergsson	F. Jonsson	R. Gröndal	Jury Rank	Televote Rank	Combined Rank	Points
01	Ukraine	21	12	18	8	7	12	15	11	
02	Belarus	12	19	19	21	20	19	17	22	
03	Azerbaijan	3	7	6	7	5	6	25	15	
04	Iceland									
05	Norway	15	17	12	13	22	16	9	10	1
06	Romania	7	10	20	19	17	14	16	14	
07	Armenia	17	14	24	18	18	18	7	9	2
08	Montenegro	8	16	15	20	19	15	23	24	
09	Poland	24	24	23	15	16	23	2	8	3
10	Greece	13	23	21	25	14	21	11	16	
11	Austria	2	2	1	5	4	2	3	2	10
12	Germany	16	20	17	16	15	17	13	13	
13	Sweden	4	4	4	3	2	4	4	4	7
14	France	23	25	25	22	25	25	10	20	
15	Russia	22	11	11	11	13	13	19	17	
16	Italy	20	21	13	24	24	22	24	25	
17	Slovenia	10	8	9	14	12	10	22	19	
18	Finland	9	13	7	12	11	7	8	6	5
19	Spain	18	15	22	17	21	20	18	23	
20	Switzerland	25	22	16	23	23	24	12	21	
21	Hungary	5	5	5	4	9	5	6	5	6
22	Malta	14	6	14	10	8	8	20	12	
23	Denmark	1	1	2	1	1	1	5	3	8
24	Netherlands	6	3	3	2	3	3	1	1	12
25	San Marino	19	9	10	9	6	11	21	18	
26	United Kingdom	11	18	8	6	10	9	14	7	4
