= Romania in the Eurovision Song Contest 2014 =

- Eurovision Song Contest 2014
- Participating broadcaster: Televiziunea Română (TVR)
- Country: Romania
- Selection process: Selecția Națională 2014
- Selection date: 1 March 2014

Competing entry
- Song: "Miracle"
- Artist: Paula Seling and Ovi
- Songwriters: Ovi; Philip Halloun; Frida Amundsen; Beyond51

Placement
- Semi-final result: Qualified (2nd, 125 points)
- Final result: 12th, 72 points

Participation chronology

Romania was represented at the Eurovision Song Contest 2014 with the song "Miracle" written by Ovi, Phillip Halloun, Frida Amundsen and Beyond51. The song was performed by Paula Seling and Ovi, both of them which had previously represented Romania in the Eurovision Song Contest in 2010 where they placed third in the final with the song "Playing with Fire". The Romanian broadcaster Televiziunea Română (TVR) organised the national final Selecția Națională 2014 in order to select the Romanian entry for the 2014 contest in Copenhagen, Denmark. Twelve entries were selected to compete in the national final on 1 March 2014 where "Miracle" performed by Paula Seling and Ovi was selected as the winner after scoring top marks from a five-member jury panel and a public televote.

Romania was drawn to compete in the second semi-final of the Eurovision Song Contest which took place on 8 May 2014. Performing as the closing entry during the show in position 15, "Miracle" was announced among the top 10 entries of the second semi-final and therefore qualified to compete in the final on 10 May. It was later revealed that Romania placed second out of the 15 participating countries in the semi-final with 125 points. In the final, Romania performed in position 6 and placed twelfth out of the 26 participating countries, scoring 72 points.

== Background ==
Prior to the 2014 contest, Romania had participated in the Eurovision Song Contest 15 times since its first entry in 1994. To this point, its highest placing in the contest has been third place, which the nation achieved on two occasions: in 2005 with the song "Let Me Try" performed by Luminița Anghel and Sistem, and in 2010 with the song "Playing with Fire" performed by Paula Seling and Ovi. To this point, Romania has qualified to the final on every occasion since the introduction of semi-finals to the format of the contest in 2004. In 2013, "It's My Life" by Cezar placed 13th in the final.

The Romanian national broadcaster, Televiziunea Română (TVR), broadcasts the event within Romania and organizes the selection process for the nation's entry. TVR has consistently selected the Romanian Eurovision entry through national finals that feature a competition among several artists and songs. The broadcaster confirmed their intentions to participate at the 2014 Eurovision Song Contest on 22 November 2013. TVR had set up national finals with several artists to choose both the song and performer to compete at Eurovision for Romania, a procedure which the broadcaster opted for once again to select their 2014 entry.

== Before Eurovision ==
=== Selecția Națională 2014 ===
Selecția Națională 2014 was the national final organised by TVR in order to select Romania's entry for the Eurovision Song Contest 2014. The competition took place at the Sică Alexandrescu Drama Theatre in Brașov on 1 March 2014 and was hosted by Nicolle Stănese. The show was televised on TVR1, TVR HD, TVRi as well as online via the broadcaster's streaming service TVR+. The official Eurovision Song Contest website eurovision.tv also provided an online stream for the competition.

==== Competing entries ====
TVR opened a submission period for artists and composers to submit their entries between 15 January 2014 and 14 February 2014. The broadcaster received 159 submissions after the submission deadline passed, of which 150 were eligible for consideration. An expert committee reviewed the received submissions between 19 and 20 February 2014 and selected twelve entries for the national final. Among the competing artists were Paula Seling and Ovi, which both previously represented Romania in the Eurovision Song Contest in 2010.

Artist	Song	Songwriter(s)
Anca Florescu	"Hearts Collide"	Gabriel Băruța, Alexandra Ivan
Bere Gratis	"Despre mine și ea"	Marius Bob, Mihail Georgescu
The dAdA	"Unpredictable"	Mihai Ungureanu, Marian Bobiceag, Septimiu Urzică, Theodor Nicolae
Naomy	"Dacă tu iubești"	Jimi Laco, Rareș Borcea
Paula Seling and Ovi	"Miracle"	Ovi, Phillip Halloun, Victor Forberg Skogberg, Frida Amundsen
Renée Santana feat. Mike Diamondz	"Letting Go"	Mihai Alexandru, Alexandra Niculae, Mike Diamondz
Șăl	"Hardjock"	Marcel Crăciunescu
Silvia Dumitrescu	"Fiorul iubirii"	Virgil Popescu
Ștefan Stan feat. TeddyK	"Breathe"	Eduard Cârcotă, Teodora Constantin
Vaida	"One More Time"	Bogdan Tașcău, Cristian Dumitrașcu, Alin Țigănuș, Alexandra Ivan
Vizi Imre	"Kind of Girl"	Vizi Imre
The Zuralia Orchestra	"You Know"	Aurel Mirea

==== Final ====
The final took place on 1 March 2014. Twelve songs competed and the winner, "Miracle" performed by Paula Seling and Ovi, was determined by the 50/50 combination of the votes from a five-member jury panel and public televoting. The members of the jury panel that voted were: Mădălin Voicu (musician, politician), Alexandra Cepraga (music director), Nico (singer, represented Romania in the Eurovision Song Contest 2008), Bobby Stoica (composer, producer) and Nancy Brandes (conductor, lyricist, actress). In addition to the performances of the competing entries, the interval acts featured performances by Stela Popescu, Corina Chiriac, Proconsul and Luminiţa Dobrescu. The final also featured a tribute to the 46th anniversary of the now discontinued Golden Stag Festival.

Final – 1 March 2014
R/O	Artist	Song	Jury		Televote		Total	Place
R/O	Artist	Song	Votes	Points	Votes	Points	Total	Place
1	Paula Seling and Ovi	"Miracle"	54	12	2,052	10	22	1
2	Bere Gratis	"Despre mine și ea"	33	8	277	1	9	7
3	The dAdA	"Unpredictable"	15	2	519	3	5	9
4	The Zuralia Orchestra	"You Know"	15	3	215	0	3	11
5	Vizi Imre	"Kind of Girl"	35	10	976	6	16	3
6	Anca Florescu	"Hearts Collide"	25	5	1,404	8	13	4
7	Silvia Dumitrescu	"Fiorul iubirii"	5	0	112	0	0	12
8	Renée Santana feat. Mike Diamondz	"Letting Go"	31	6	711	4	10	6
9	Ștefan Stan feat. TeddyK	"Breathe"	31	7	774	5	12	5
10	Naomy	"Dacă tu iubești"	15	1	366	2	3	10
11	Vaida	"One More Time"	23	4	7,509	12	16	2
12	Șăl	"Hardjock"	8	0	1,321	7	7	8

Detailed Jury Votes
R/O	Song	M. Voicu	Nico	B. Stoica	A. Cepraga	N. Brandes	Total
1	"Miracle"	10	10	12	10	12	54
2	"Despre mine și ea"	6	7	8	7	5	33
3	"Unpredictable"	4		5		6	15
4	"You Know"	3	3	1	1	7	15
5	"Kind of Girl"	7	8	7	5	8	35
6	"Hearts Collide"	1	6	6	8	4	25
7	"Fiorul iubirii"		1		4		5
8	"Letting Go"		5	10	6	10	31
9	"Breathe"	2	12	3	12	2	31
10	"Dacă tu iubești"	5	2	2	3	3	15
11	"One More Time"	12	4	4	2	1	23
12	"Hardjock"	8					8

=== Promotion ===
Paula Seling and Ovi made several appearances across Europe to specifically promote "Miracle" as the Romanian Eurovision entry. On 9 April, Paula Seling and Ovi performed during the Eurovision in Concert event which was held at the Melkweg venue in Amsterdam, Netherlands and hosted by Cornald Maas and Sandra Reemer. On 13 April, they performed during the London Eurovision Party, which was held at the Café de Paris venue in London, United Kingdom and hosted by Nicki French and Paddy O'Connell.

== At Eurovision ==
Paula Seling and Ovi presenting themselves and "Miracle" at the Eurovision Song Contest 2014

According to Eurovision rules, all nations with the exceptions of the host country and the "Big Five" (France, Germany, Italy, Spain and the United Kingdom) are required to qualify from one of two semi-finals in order to compete for the final; the top ten countries from each semi-final progress to the final. The European Broadcasting Union (EBU) split up the competing countries into six different pots based on voting patterns from previous contests, with countries with favourable voting histories put into the same pot. On 20 January 2014, an allocation draw was held which placed each country into one of the two semi-finals, as well as which half of the show they would perform in. Romania was placed into the second semi-final, to be held on 8 May 2014, and was scheduled to perform in the second half of the show.

Once all the competing songs for the 2014 contest had been released, the running order for the semi-finals was decided by the shows' producers rather than through another draw, so that similar songs were not placed next to each other. Romania was set to perform last in position 15, following the entry from Slovenia.

All three shows were broadcast in Romania on TVR1, TVRi and TVR HD with commentary by Bogdan Stănescu. The Romanian spokesperson, who announced the Romanian votes during the final, was Sonia Argint Ionescu.

=== Semi-final ===
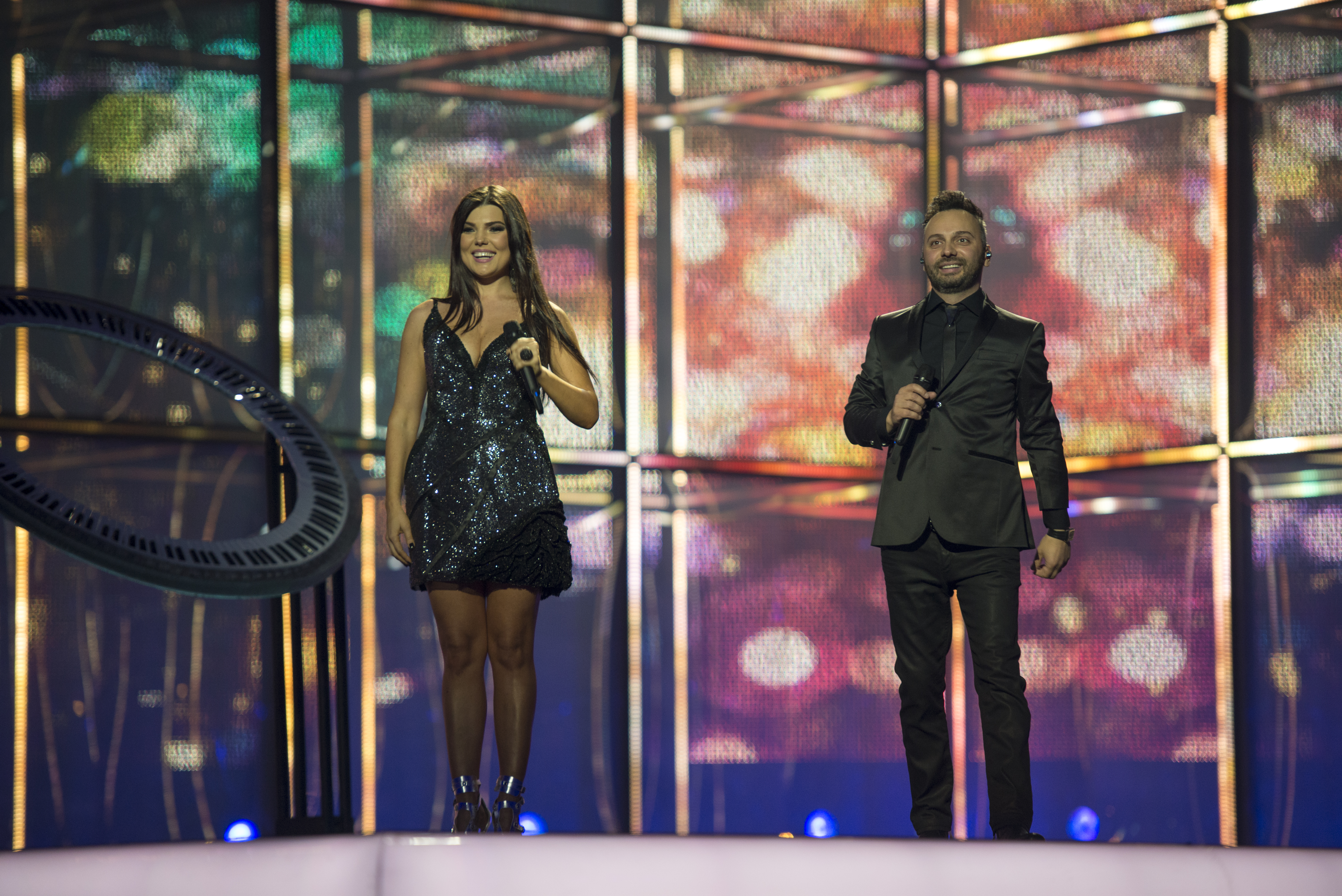
Paula Seling and Ovi during a rehearsal before the second semi-final

Paula Seling and Ovi took part in technical rehearsals on 30 April and 3 May, followed by dress rehearsals on 7 and 8 May. This included the jury show on 7 May where the professional juries of each country watched and voted on the competing entries.

The stage show featured Paula Seling wearing a short shiny dress and Ovi dressed in a black suit. The performance also featured a large circular keyboard played by Ovi, which symbolised unity as explained by the performers, and a holographic effect that superimposed Seling on the screen at one end of the stage before disappearing and then appearing at the other end of the catwalk. The stage presentation also featured a choreographed routine which included Seling and Ovi embracing each other at the end of the song. The background LED screens and stage floor transitioned from projecting blue tones to silhouettes of butterflies and whirling colour streams, with pyrotechnic flame effects appearing in front of the stage. Paula Seling and Ovi were joined by four backing vocalists on stage: Julie Lindell, Line Krogholm, Mads Storm and Marcus Only.

At the end of the show, Romania was announced as having finished in the top ten and subsequently qualifying for the grand final. It was later revealed that Romania placed second in the semi-final, receiving a total of 125 points.

=== Final ===
Shortly after the second semi-final, a winners' press conference was held for the ten qualifying countries. As part of this press conference, the qualifying artists took part in a draw to determine which half of the grand final they would subsequently participate in. This draw was done in the order the countries were announced during the semi-final. Romania was drawn to compete in the first half. Following this draw, the shows' producers decided upon the running order of the final, as they had done for the semi-finals. Romania was subsequently placed to perform in position 6, following the entry from Norway and before the entry from Armenia.

Paula Seling and Ovi once again took part in dress rehearsals on 9 and 10 May before the final, including the jury final where the professional juries cast their final votes before the live show. The duet performed a repeat of their semi-final performance during the final on 10 May. At the conclusion of the voting, Romania finished in twelfth place with 72 points.

=== Voting ===
Voting during the three shows consisted of 50 percent public televoting and 50 percent from a jury deliberation. The jury consisted of five music industry professionals who were citizens of the country they represent, with their names published before the contest to ensure transparency. This jury was asked to judge each contestant based on: vocal capacity; the stage performance; the song's composition and originality; and the overall impression by the act. In addition, no member of a national jury could be related in any way to any of the competing acts in such a way that they cannot vote impartially and independently. The individual rankings of each jury member were released shortly after the grand final.

Following the release of the full split voting by the EBU after the conclusion of the competition, it was revealed that Romania had placed ninth with the public televote and seventeenth with the jury vote in the final. In the public vote, Romania scored 103 points, while with the jury vote, Romania scored 51 points. In the second semi-final, Romania placed second with the public televote with 126 points and fifth with the jury vote, scoring 99 points.

Below is a breakdown of points awarded to Romania and awarded by Romania in the second semi-final and grand final of the contest, and the breakdown of the jury voting and televoting conducted during the two shows:

==== Points awarded to Romania ====
Points awarded to Romania (Semi-final 2)
Score	Country
12 points	Austria; Israel; Malta
10 points	Greece; Norway
8 points	Belarus; Germany; Macedonia
7 points	Ireland; Slovenia; Switzerland
6 points	Finland; Georgia; United Kingdom
5 points	
4 points	Italy
3 points	
2 points	Lithuania
1 point	

Points awarded to Romania (Final)
Score	Country
12 points	Moldova
10 points	
8 points	Austria; Israel; Malta; Spain
7 points	
6 points	Azerbaijan
5 points	Belgium; Italy
4 points	Macedonia; Norway
3 points	
2 points	Ireland
1 point	Belarus; Portugal

==== Points awarded by Romania ====
Points awarded by Romania (Semi-final 2)
Score	Country
12 points	Austria
10 points	Switzerland
8 points	Belarus
7 points	Greece
6 points	Slovenia
5 points	Finland
4 points	Norway
3 points	Malta
2 points	Ireland
1 point	Israel

Points awarded by Romania (Final)
Score	Country
12 points	Sweden
10 points	Hungary
8 points	Austria
7 points	Armenia
6 points	Switzerland
5 points	Spain
4 points	Denmark
3 points	Netherlands
2 points	Germany
1 point	Norway

==== Detailed voting results ====
The following members comprised the Romanian jury:

- Mădălin Voicu (jury chairperson) – musician, violinist, conductor, composer
- Mirela Fugaru – singer, lyricist, vocal coach
- Mihai "Bobby" Stoica – music producer, composer
- Călin Geambașu – musician, singer, composer, band leader
- Nicoleta Matei (Nico) – singer, represented Romania in the 2008 Contest

Detailed voting results from Romania (Semi-final 2)
R/O	Country	M. Voicu	M. Fugaru	M. Stoica	C. Geambașu	Nico	Jury Rank	Televote Rank	Combined Rank	Points
01	Malta	6	3	3	7	2	2	12	8	3
02	Israel	9	12	7	10	9	11	6	10	1
03	Norway	12	4	6	6	3	7	7	7	4
04	Georgia	13	14	13	13	14	13	13	13	
05	Poland	14	13	14	14	13	14	10	12	
06	Austria	10	1	1	1	1	1	2	1	12
07	Lithuania	11	10	12	12	12	12	14	14	
08	Finland	8	6	4	3	4	4	9	6	5
09	Ireland	7	7	8	2	8	8	8	9	2
10	Belarus	5	2	11	4	5	5	3	3	8
11	Macedonia	4	9	5	9	10	9	11	11	
12	Switzerland	2	8	2	5	7	3	4	2	10
13	Greece	3	11	10	11	11	10	1	4	7
14	Slovenia	1	5	9	8	6	6	5	5	6
15	Romania									

Detailed voting results from Romania (Final)
R/O	Country	M. Voicu	M. Fugaru	M. Stoica	C. Geambașu	Nico	Jury Rank	Televote Rank	Combined Rank	Points
01	Ukraine	11	13	13	13	8	14	10	11	
02	Belarus	10	10	14	6	9	10	15	13	
03	Azerbaijan	17	19	11	19	16	18	25	22	
04	Iceland	7	25	23	25	22	21	23	24	
05	Norway	23	9	3	7	5	9	9	10	1
06	Romania									
07	Armenia	20	5	10	3	4	6	4	4	7
08	Montenegro	19	11	18	21	20	19	22	21	
09	Poland	22	23	19	23	23	23	21	23	
10	Greece	8	22	20	20	24	20	5	12	
11	Austria	14	7	9	5	7	7	2	3	8
12	Germany	5	6	1	15	6	3	11	9	2
13	Sweden	16	1	4	4	2	2	6	1	12
14	France	25	24	22	24	21	25	24	25	
15	Russia	24	21	25	16	25	24	16	20	
16	Italy	6	16	21	14	13	15	19	17	
17	Slovenia	4	15	12	9	15	13	13	14	
18	Finland	9	12	7	12	12	12	18	16	
19	Spain	15	3	8	2	14	5	8	6	5
20	Switzerland	1	18	2	8	11	4	7	5	6
21	Hungary	13	4	15	11	1	8	1	2	10
22	Malta	12	14	16	17	19	17	20	18	
23	Denmark	3	2	5	1	3	1	12	7	4
24	Netherlands	18	8	6	10	10	11	3	8	3
25	San Marino	21	20	24	22	18	22	17	19	
26	United Kingdom	2	17	17	18	17	16	14	15	

== See also ==
- List of music released by Romanian artists that has charted in major music markets
