= Russia in the Eurovision Song Contest 2014 =

- Eurovision Song Contest 2014
- Country: Russia
- Selection process: Internal selection
- Announcement date: Artist: 15 March 2014; Song: 19 March 2014

Competing entry
- Song: "Shine"
- Artist: Tolmachevy Sisters
- Songwriters: Philipp Kirkorov; Dimitris Kontopoulos; John Ballard; Ralph Charlie; Gerard James Borg

Placement
- Semi-final result: Qualified (6th, 63 points)
- Final result: 7th, 89 points

Participation chronology

Russia was represented at the Eurovision Song Contest 2014 with the song "Shine", written by Philipp Kirkorov, Dimitris Kontopoulos, John Ballard, Ralph Charlie, and Gerard James Borg, and performed by the Tolmachevy Sisters, winners of the Junior Eurovision Song Contest 2006. The Russian entry was selected internally by the Russian broadcaster Russia-1 (RTR). Russia qualified from the first semi-final and placed 7th in the final, scoring 89 points.

== Before Eurovision ==
=== Internal selection ===
On 1 September 2013, RTR announced that a national final, titled Kto?, would take place on 31 December 2013 to select the Russian entry for the Eurovision Song Contest 2014. RTR opened a submission period for interested artists and composers to submit their entries and a jury panel was to evaluate the received submissions and select 25 entries for the competition, however RTR announced in December 2013 that the national final would be postponed until March 2014 and the submission deadline would be extended until 28 February 2014. Plans for the national final were later abandoned by the broadcaster due to the poor quality of submitted songs.

On 15 March 2014, RTR announced that they had internally selected the Tolmachevy Sisters to represent Russia in Copenhagen. The Tolmachevy Sisters' selection as the Russian representative was decided upon by a jury panel. Tolmachevy Sisters previously won the Junior Eurovision Song Contest in 2006. The Russian song, "Shine", was presented to the public on 19 March 2014. "Shine" was composed by Philipp Kirkorov and Dimitris Kontopoulos, with lyrics by John Ballard, Ralph Charlie and Gerard James Borg; Kontopoulos, Ballard and Charlie had previously co-written the 2013 Azerbaijani entry "Hold Me.

==== Competing entries ====
Internal selection – Known submitted entries
Artist	Song
23:45 feat. Fidel Wicked	"Dance With Me"
Alex Jaysen	"Mysterious"
Alex Malinovsky	Unknown
Alexander Elovskih	"One Picture of My Life"
Alexander Project feat. Victoria-Viera	"Give Me Your Hand"
Alexey Serov	"I Am"
Boris Dyakov	Unknown
Buranovskiye Babushki	"Breeze"
D-Bosch	Unknown
DaKi	"Criminal"
Daniel Pride	"Black Heart"
Denesh	Unknown
Dima Lutfullin	"Neon"
Egor Lutsenko	"Emotsiya lyubvi" (Эмоция любви)
Elya Chavez	"Ty so mnoy, ya s toboy" (Ты со мной, я с тобой)
Ilya Gurov	"Beautiful"
Ilya Gurov	"Lose Control"
Ivan-da-Marya	"Igray garmon" (Играй гармонь)
Katya Volkova	"Otkroy svoye serdtse" (Открой свое сердце)
Marina Sudas	"Dusha" (Душа)
Metodie Bujor	Unknown
Natanika	"As I Desired"
Nelly Turchina	"Zoe"
Oleg Sidorov and Point Charlie	"Playing With a Life"
Olga Makovetskaya	"Proydyot" (Пройдёт)
Olstan van Guard	"How Do You Feel"
Payushchie Trusy	"Moo-Moo"
Polina Smolova	"Sometimes"
Sergey Savin	"Fearless Loving"
Shinshilli	"We Could Try"
Sofi	"Paris"
Sofya and Alyona Kankur	"Rour Is Ap"
Soprano 10	Unknown
Svetlana Surganova	Unknown
Syostry Syo	Unknown
Tim Chikovani and Sergey Ashihmin	"Ne zabyt'" (Не забыть)
Tolmachevy Sisters	"Shine"
Vadim Simonov	"Iyeroglif" (Иероглиф)
Vahtang	Unknown
Vasilina Kee and Funky Fraers	"Tvoy den'" (Твой день)
Victoria Petryk	Unknown
Vlad Tarkovsky	"You Are My Revolution"
Zetandel feat. Victoria Ray	"Never Say Never"
Zlat Khabibulin	Unknown

== At Eurovision ==
The Tolmachevy Sisters presenting their song

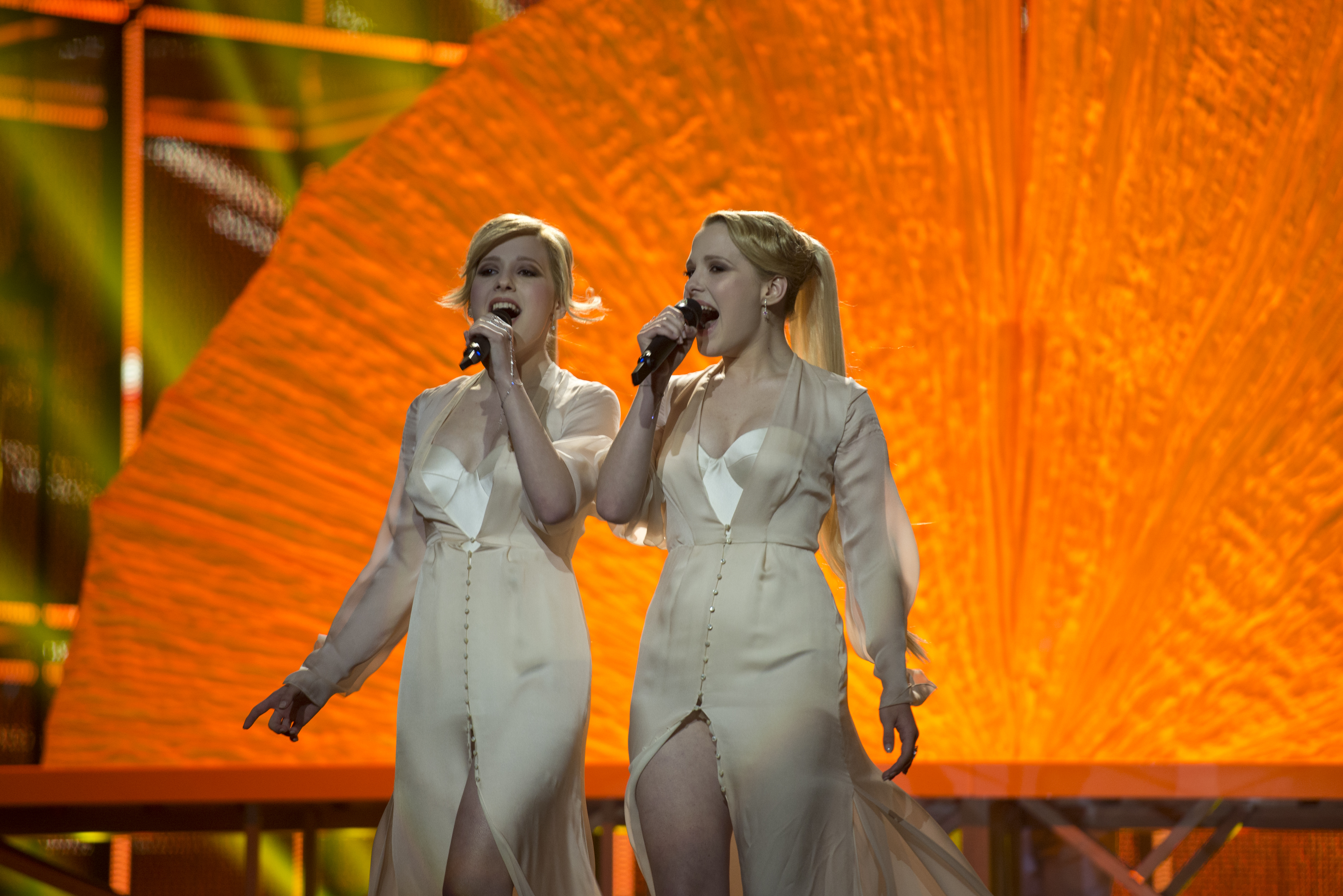
The Tolmachevy Sisters at the first semi-final dress rehearsal

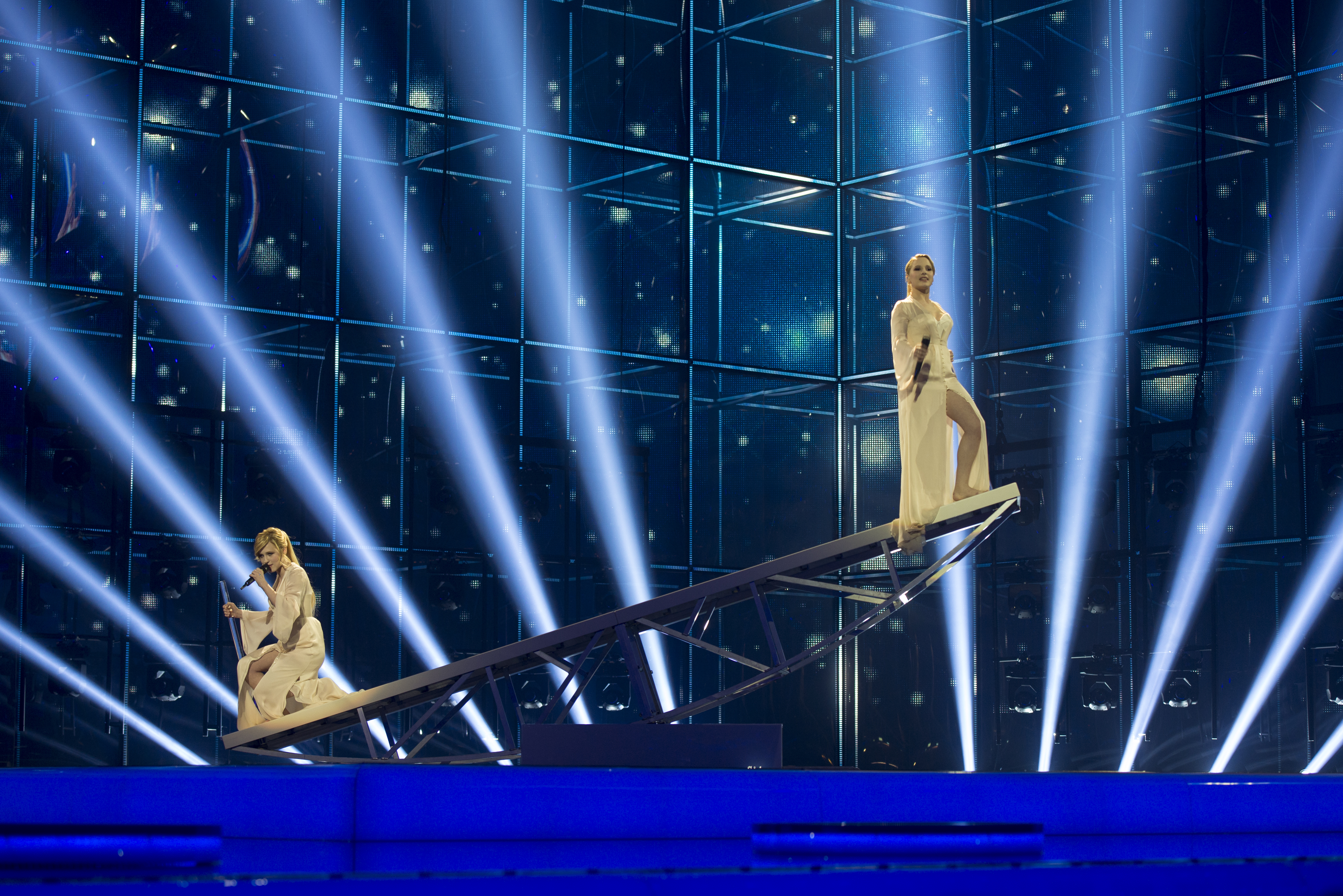
The Tolmachevy Sisters with their moving platform stage prop

During the semi-final allocation draw on 20 January 2014 at the Copenhagen City Hall, Russia was drawn to compete in the first half of the first semi-final on 6 May 2014. In the first semi-final, the producers of the show decided that Russia would perform 7th, following Albania and preceding Azerbaijan. Russia qualified from the first semi-final and competed in the final on 10 May 2014. During the winner's press conference for the first semi-final qualifiers, Russia was allocated to compete in the second half of the final. In the final, the producers of the show decided that Russia would perform 15th, following France and preceding Italy. Russia placed 7th in the final, scoring 89 points.

At the contest, the Tolmachevy Sisters were joined on stage by four backing vocalists: Anna Nilsson, Jenny Tärneberg, Anna Strandberg and Rui Andrade. The Russian performance featured the Tolmachevy Sisters performing with long translucent sticks and interacting with a platform that moved like a balance and eventually opened into a white sun-like canvas.

Following the revelation of Russia's qualification into the final during the broadcast of the first semi-final, the announcement was met by an audible booing from the venue audience. The negative reaction was believed to be a response to the Russo-Ukrainian war and Russia's stance on LGBT rights.

In Russia, both the semi-finals and the final were broadcast on Russia-1 with commentary by Olga Shelest and Dmitriy Guberniev. The Russian spokesperson revealing the result of the Russian vote in the final was 2000 Russian contest entrant and Eurovision Song Contest 2009 final co-presenter Alsou.

=== Voting ===
==== Points awarded to Russia ====
Points awarded to Russia (Semi-final 1)
Score	Country
12 points	Moldova
10 points	Azerbaijan
8 points	
7 points	Armenia
6 points	Ukraine
5 points	Hungary; Portugal
4 points	Denmark; Latvia; Montenegro
3 points	
2 points	Iceland; Sweden
1 point	Belgium; Estonia

Points awarded to Russia (Final)
Score	Country
12 points	Azerbaijan; Belarus
10 points	Armenia; Greece
8 points	Georgia; Moldova
7 points	
6 points	Lithuania; Macedonia
5 points	Malta
4 points	Ukraine
3 points	Israel
2 points	Latvia; Portugal
1 point	Estonia

==== Points awarded by Russia ====
Points awarded by Russia (Semi-final 1)
Score	Country
12 points	Armenia
10 points	Azerbaijan
8 points	Hungary
7 points	Ukraine
6 points	Sweden
5 points	Montenegro
4 points	Belgium
3 points	San Marino
2 points	Netherlands
1 point	Moldova

Points awarded by Russia (Final)
Score	Country
12 points	Belarus
10 points	Azerbaijan
8 points	Armenia
7 points	Ukraine
6 points	Hungary
5 points	Austria
4 points	Greece
3 points	Netherlands
2 points	Sweden
1 point	Iceland

==== Detailed voting results ====
The following five members comprised the Russian jury:

- Sergey Zhilin (jury chairperson) – conductor
- Margarita Mitrofanova – radio DJ, television host
- Leonid Rudenko – DJ, musician, label producer
- Dominik Joker – musician, singer, poet, composer
- Yulia Nachalova – singer

Detailed voting results from Russia (Semi-final 1)
R/O	Country	S. Zhilin	M. Mitrofanova	L. Rudenko	D. Joker	Y. Nachalova	Jury Rank	Televote Rank	Combined Rank	Points
01	Armenia	4	1	4	2	3	3	1	1	12
02	Latvia	14	8	15	10	8	11	11	12	
03	Estonia	2	7	10	7	5	5	14	11	
04	Sweden	11	11	11	6	9	9	6	5	6
05	Iceland	15	13	13	12	11	15	10	13	
06	Albania	13	14	8	11	15	13	15	15	
07	Russia									
08	Azerbaijan	3	2	3	1	2	2	3	2	10
09	Ukraine	7	5	5	5	6	4	2	4	7
10	Belgium	8	10	2	8	4	7	9	7	4
11	Moldova	5	4	9	4	10	6	12	10	1
12	San Marino	9	15	12	9	12	12	5	8	3
13	Portugal	12	9	14	13	13	14	13	14	
14	Netherlands	10	6	7	15	14	10	7	9	2
15	Montenegro	6	12	6	14	7	8	8	6	5
16	Hungary	1	3	1	3	1	1	4	3	8

Detailed voting results from Russia (Final)
R/O	Country	S. Zhilin	M. Mitrofanova	L. Rudenko	D. Joker	Y. Nachalova	Jury Rank	Televote Rank	Combined Rank	Points
01	Ukraine	9	5	7	8	2	6	4	4	7
02	Belarus	2	1	3	2	1	1	2	1	12
03	Azerbaijan	1	7	1	1	3	2	5	2	10
04	Iceland	13	17	16	16	18	13	11	10	1
05	Norway	10	18	12	3	12	10	15	11	
06	Romania	19	19	24	18	20	22	21	23	
07	Armenia	6	9	10	10	5	8	1	3	8
08	Montenegro	24	11	19	12	16	15	20	19	
09	Poland	16	25	23	19	19	24	13	20	
10	Greece	3	2	6	5	7	3	12	7	4
11	Austria	7	10	9	21	9	11	3	6	5
12	Germany	21	12	20	25	23	23	14	21	
13	Sweden	14	24	11	22	13	17	6	9	2
14	France	18	21	22	13	24	21	23	24	
15	Russia									
16	Italy	23	22	25	20	25	25	25	25	
17	Slovenia	15	14	18	14	22	16	17	17	
18	Finland	22	20	14	11	14	14	16	16	
19	Spain	17	23	21	15	17	19	18	22	
20	Switzerland	20	15	17	24	21	20	7	12	
21	Hungary	4	4	5	6	8	5	8	5	6
22	Malta	5	3	4	7	4	4	24	15	
23	Denmark	11	16	2	17	10	12	22	18	
24	Netherlands	8	6	8	9	6	7	10	8	3
25	San Marino	25	13	15	23	11	18	9	13	
26	United Kingdom	12	8	13	4	15	9	19	14	
