= Armenia in the Eurovision Song Contest 2014 =

- Eurovision Song Contest 2014
- Participating broadcaster: Public Television of Armenia (AMPTV)
- Country: Armenia
- Selection process: Internal selection
- Announcement date: Artist: 31 December 2013; Song: 14 March 2014

Competing entry
- Song: "Not Alone"
- Artist: Aram Mp3
- Songwriters: Aram Sargsyan; Garik Papoyan

Placement
- Semi-final result: Qualified (4th, 121 points)
- Final result: 4th, 174 points

Participation chronology

Armenia was represented at the Eurovision Song Contest 2014 with the song "Not Alone" written by Aram Mp3 and Garik Papoyan. The song was performed by Aram Mp3, who was selected internally by the Armenian broadcaster Public Television of Armenia (AMPTV) to represent Armenia in the 2014 contest in Copenhagen, Denmark. Aram Mp3's selection as the Armenian artist was announced on 31 December 2013, while the song "Not Alone" was later presented to the public on 14 March 2014 during a special presentation programme.

Armenia was drawn to compete in the first semi-final of the Eurovision Song Contest which took place on 6 May 2014. Performing as the opening entry for the show in position 1, "Not Alone" was announced among the top 10 entries of the first semi-final and therefore qualified to compete in the final on 10 May. It was later revealed that Armenia placed fourth out of the 16 participating countries in the semi-final with 121 points. In the final, Armenia performed in position 7 and placed fourth out of the 26 participating countries with 174 points.

== Background ==
Prior to the 2014 contest, Armenia had participated in the Eurovision Song Contest seven times since its first entry in 2006. Its highest placing in the contest, to this point, has been fourth place, which the nation achieved in 2008 with the song "Qélé, Qélé" performed by Sirusho. Armenia had, to this point, failed to qualify to the final on only one occasion in 2011. The nation briefly withdrew from the contest in 2012 due to long-standing tensions with then host country Azerbaijan. In 2013, "Lonely Planet" performed by the band Dorians placed eighteenth in the final.

The Armenian national broadcaster, Public Television of Armenia (AMPTV), broadcasts the event within Armenia and organises the selection process for the nation's entry. AMPTV confirmed their intentions to participate at the 2014 Eurovision Song Contest on 22 November 2013. Armenia has used various methods to select the Armenian entry in the past, such as a live televised national final to choose the performer, song or both to compete at Eurovision. However internal selections have also been held on occasion. The broadcaster opted to internally select both the artist and the song for the 2014 contest, a procedure that had only been used once before to select Armenia's debut entry in 2006.

== Before Eurovision ==
=== Internal selection ===
The Armenian entry for the Eurovision Song Contest 2014 was internally selected by the AMPTV. On 24 December 2013, the broadcaster indicated that an artist had been selected and that their name would be announced on 31 December 2013. During the AMPTV New Year's Eve programme Big Night Gala TV Show on 31 December, Aram Mp3 was announced as the Armenian representative. AMPTV later announced in February 2014 that the Armenian entry had been selected from more than 75 songs submitted by songwriters worldwide.

The song "Not Alone", composed by Aram Mp3 with lyrics by Garik Papoyan, was announced as the Armenian entry on 14 March 2014. Aram Mp3 filmed the official video for the song prior to the presentation, which was directed by Grigor Gasparyan and featured actors Diana Malenko and Vahag Martirosyan. The song and video were presented to the public on the same day during a special presentation programme, hosted by Gohar Gasparyan and broadcast on Armenia 1 as well as online via the official Eurovision Song Contest website eurovision.tv.

=== Promotion ===
Aram Mp3 made several appearances across Europe to specifically promote "Not Alone" as the Armenian Eurovision entry. On 5 April, Aram Mp3 performed during the Eurovision in Concert event which was held at the Melkweg venue in Amsterdam, Netherlands and hosted by Cornald Maas and Sandra Reemer. During his performance, he was booed by the audience due to his previously made criticism towards the lifestyle and sexuality of Austrian 2014 Eurovision entrant Conchita Wurst. On 13 April, Aram Mp3 performed during the London Eurovision Party, which was held at the Café de Paris venue in London, United Kingdom and hosted by Nicki French and Paddy O'Connell.

== At Eurovision ==
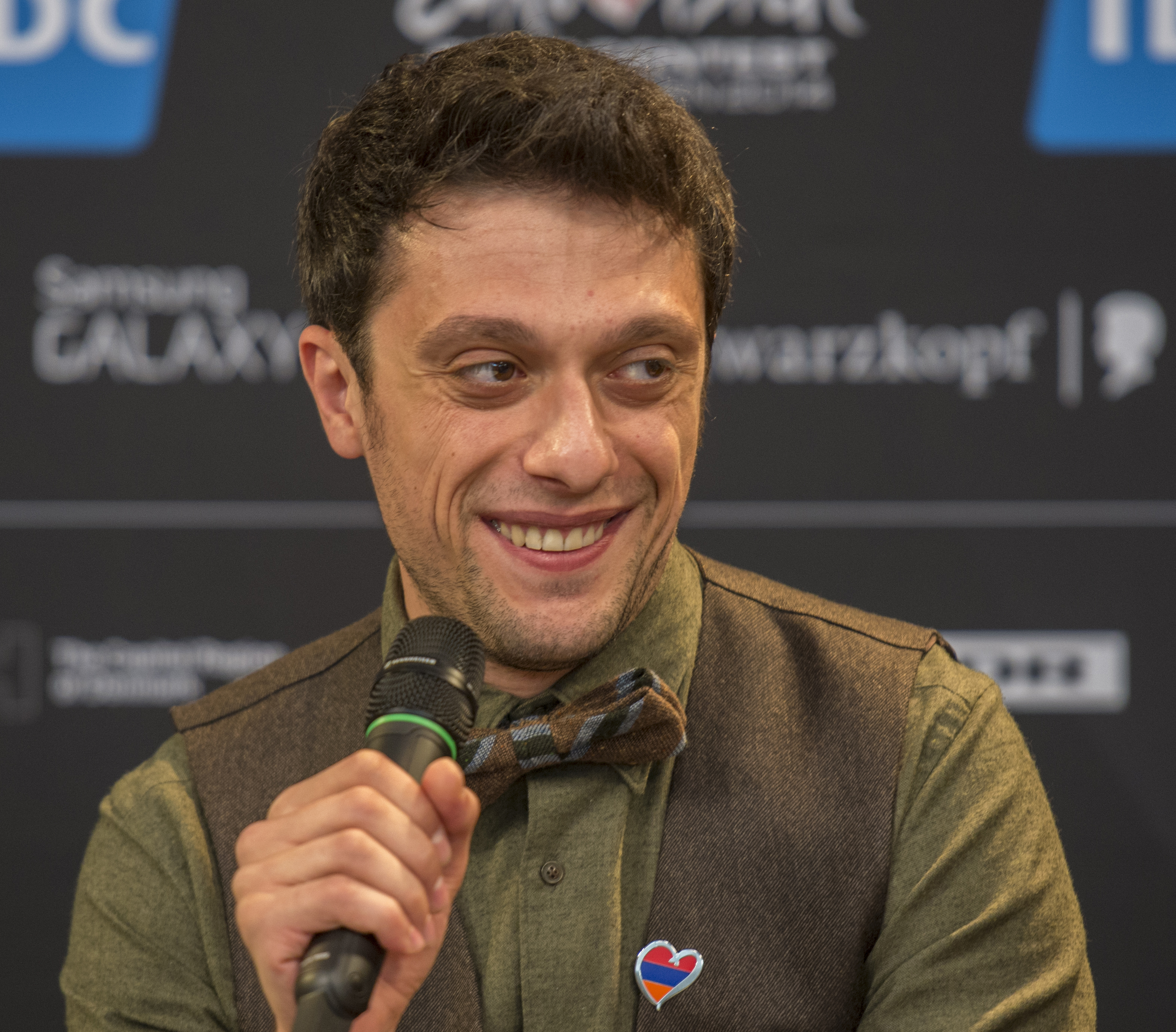
Aram Mp3 during a press meet and greet

All countries except the "Big Five" (France, Germany, Italy, Spain and the United Kingdom), and the host country, are required to qualify from one of two semi-finals in order to compete for the final; the top ten countries from each semi-final progress to the final. The European Broadcasting Union (EBU) split up the competing countries into six different pots based on voting patterns from previous contests, with countries with favourable voting histories put into the same pot. On 20 January 2014, a special allocation draw was held which placed each country into one of the two semi-finals, as well as which half of the show they would perform in. Armenia was placed into the first semi-final, to be held on 6 May 2014, and was scheduled to perform in the first half of the show.

Once all the competing songs for the 2014 contest had been released, the running order for the semi-finals was decided by the shows' producers rather than through another draw, so that similar songs were not placed next to each other. Armenia was set to open the show and perform in position 1, before the entry from Latvia.

In Armenia, the two semi-finals and the final were broadcast on Armenia 1 with commentary by Erik Antaranyan and Anna Avanesyan during the semi-finals, and by Tigran Danielyan and Arevik Udumyan during the final. The Armenian spokesperson, who announced the Armenian votes during the final, was Anna Avanesyan.

=== Semi-final ===
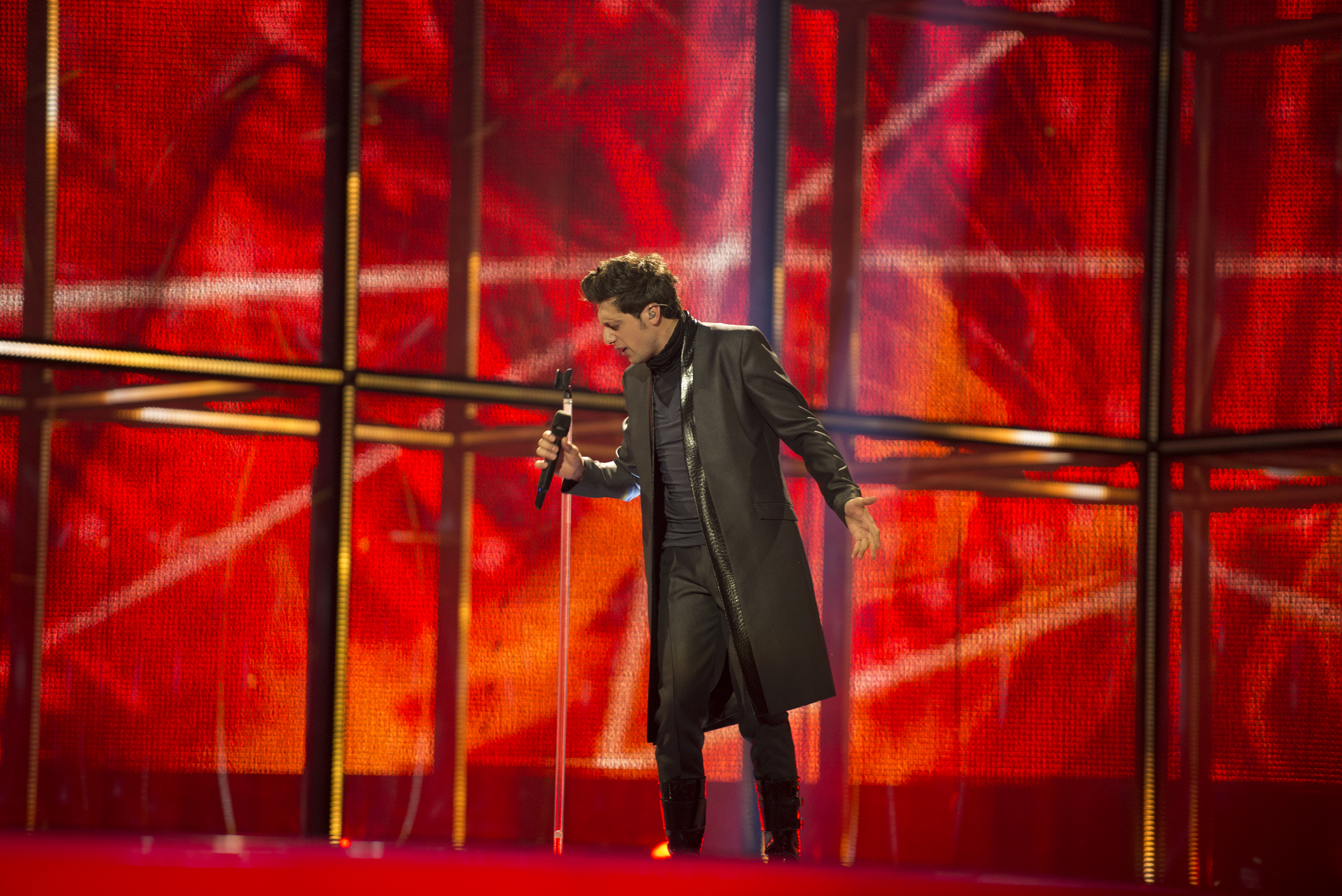
Aram Mp3 during a rehearsal before the first semi-final

Aram Mp3 took part in technical rehearsals on 28 April and 2 May, followed by dress rehearsals on 5 and 6 May. This included the jury show on 5 May where the professional juries of each country watched and voted on the competing entries.

The Armenian performance featured Aram Mp3 wearing a dark grey coat with a diamond-shaped brooch in the colours of the Armenian flag, black gloves and black boots performing alone on stage. The LED screens transitioned from dark settings with spotlights on Aram Mp3 from the back to explosive and pulsating elements with flickering lights as the song progressed. The stage presentation also included pyrotechnic flame effects and the use of a wind machine during the performance.

At the end of the show, Armenia was announced as having finished in the top 10 and subsequently qualifying for the grand final. It was later revealed that Armenia placed fourth in the semi-final, receiving a total of 121 points.

=== Final ===
Shortly after the first semi-final, a winners' press conference was held for the ten qualifying countries. As part of this press conference, the qualifying artists took part in a draw to determine which half of the grand final they would subsequently participate in. This draw was done in the order the countries were announced during the semi-final. Armenia was drawn to compete in the first half. Following this draw, the shows' producers decided upon the running order of the final, as they had done for the semi-finals. Armenia was subsequently placed to perform in position 7, following the entry from Romania and before the entry from Montenegro.

Aram Mp3 once again took part in dress rehearsals on 9 and 10 May before the final, including the jury final where the professional juries cast their final votes before the live show. Aram Mp3 performed a repeat of his semi-final performance during the final on 10 May. Armenia placed fourth in the final, scoring 174 points.

=== Voting ===
Voting during the three shows consisted of 50 percent public televoting and 50 percent from a jury deliberation. The jury consisted of five music industry professionals who were citizens of the country they represent, with their names published before the contest to ensure transparency. This jury was asked to judge each contestant based on: vocal capacity; the stage performance; the song's composition and originality; and the overall impression by the act. In addition, no member of a national jury could be related in any way to any of the competing acts in such a way that they cannot vote impartially and independently. The individual rankings of each jury member were released shortly after the grand final.

Following the release of the full split voting by the EBU after the conclusion of the competition, it was revealed that Armenia had placed third with the public televote and fifth with the jury vote in the final. In the public vote, Armenia scored 193 points, while with the jury vote, Armenia scored 125 points. In the first semi-final, Armenia placed fourth with the public televote with 121 points and fourth with the jury vote, scoring 102 points.

Below is a breakdown of points awarded to Armenia and awarded by Armenia in the first semi-final and grand final of the contest, and the breakdown of the jury voting and televoting conducted during the two shows:

==== Points awarded to Armenia ====
Points awarded to Armenia (Semi-final 1)
Score	Country
12 points	France; Netherlands; Russia; Ukraine
10 points	Montenegro; San Marino
8 points	Hungary; Sweden
7 points	
6 points	Latvia; Spain
5 points	Albania; Denmark; Estonia
4 points	Portugal
3 points	Belgium; Iceland
2 points	
1 point	

Points awarded to Armenia (Final)
Score	Country
12 points	Austria; Georgia; France
10 points	Belarus; Latvia; Montenegro; Ukraine
8 points	Macedonia; Russia
7 points	Greece; Hungary; Netherlands; Romania
6 points	Germany; Israel; Malta; San Marino
5 points	Estonia; Sweden
4 points	Finland; Portugal; Spain
3 points	Moldova
2 points	Denmark; Iceland
1 point	Poland

==== Points awarded by Armenia ====
Points awarded by Armenia (Semi-final 1)
Score	Country
12 points	Ukraine
10 points	Netherlands
8 points	Montenegro
7 points	Russia
6 points	Belgium
5 points	Estonia
4 points	Sweden
3 points	Portugal
2 points	San Marino
1 point	Hungary

Points awarded by Armenia (Final)
Score	Country
12 points	Montenegro
10 points	Russia
8 points	Belarus
7 points	Greece
6 points	Germany
5 points	Switzerland
4 points	Netherlands
3 points	San Marino
2 points	Spain
1 point	Denmark

==== Detailed voting results ====
The following members comprised the Armenian jury:

- Asatur Asatryan (jury chairperson) – musician, producer
- Arman Davtyan – painter, sculptor, designer
- Inga Arshakyan – singer, represented Armenia in the 2009 Contest
- Anush Arshakyan – singer, represented Armenia in the 2009 Contest
- Avet Barseghyan – radio and television host, songwriter

Detailed voting results from Armenia (Semi-final 1)
R/O	Country	A. Asatryan	A. Davtyan	I. Arshakyan	A. Arshakyan	A. Barseghyan	Jury Rank	Televote Rank	Combined Rank	Points
01	Armenia									
02	Latvia	12	11	12	14	12	12	11	14	
03	Estonia	2	1	2	2	1	2	10	6	5
04	Sweden	14	13	14	10	14	13	3	7	4
05	Iceland	10	7	10	7	7	8	13	13	
06	Albania	5	6	5	5	6	5	14	12	
07	Russia	11	9	11	9	5	10	1	4	7
08	Azerbaijan	15	15	15	15	15	15	15	15	
09	Ukraine	6	10	7	3	3	6	2	1	12
10	Belgium	4	3	4	6	8	4	8	5	6
11	Moldova	7	4	9	8	10	7	12	11	
12	San Marino	8	8	6	12	9	9	7	9	2
13	Portugal	9	12	8	11	11	11	5	8	3
14	Netherlands	3	5	3	4	4	3	6	2	10
15	Montenegro	1	2	1	1	2	1	9	3	8
16	Hungary	13	14	13	13	13	14	4	10	1

Detailed voting results from Armenia (Final)
R/O	Country	A. Asatryan	A. Davtyan	I. Arshakyan	A. Arshakyan	A. Barseghyan	Jury Rank	Televote Rank	Combined Rank	Points
01	Ukraine	20	22	20	21	20	20	7	15	
02	Belarus	4	5	4	4	4	3	5	3	8
03	Azerbaijan	25	25	25	25	25	25	25	25	
04	Iceland	11	8	5	3	9	5	19	11	
05	Norway	15	19	9	15	19	18	21	23	
06	Romania	16	6	16	18	17	17	17	20	
07	Armenia									
08	Montenegro	2	1	2	2	2	2	4	1	12
09	Poland	18	2	17	13	5	11	16	16	
10	Greece	14	4	18	16	3	10	6	4	7
11	Austria	23	21	23	24	23	24	2	14	
12	Germany	3	7	3	5	16	4	12	5	6
13	Sweden	24	23	24	10	24	22	3	12	
14	France	19	18	19	19	14	19	13	18	
15	Russia	6	9	12	9	8	6	1	2	10
16	Italy	13	10	15	14	15	16	23	24	
17	Slovenia	12	11	13	6	12	8	22	17	
18	Finland	17	12	14	8	13	15	20	21	
19	Spain	7	15	10	12	11	12	11	9	2
20	Switzerland	10	13	8	20	6	13	8	6	5
21	Hungary	22	24	22	23	22	23	10	19	
22	Malta	1	3	1	1	1	1	24	13	
23	Denmark	5	14	11	17	7	9	14	10	1
24	Netherlands	8	16	7	11	10	7	15	7	4
25	San Marino	9	17	6	7	18	14	9	8	3
26	United Kingdom	21	20	21	22	21	21	18	22	
