= Bere Gratis =

- Origin: Bucharest, Romania
- Genres: Pop rock
- Years active: 1998–present
- Labels: Cat Music/Media Services, exclusive EMI licensee for Romania (2009–present), Nova Music Entertainment (2000–2008)
- Members: Mihai 'Mitza' Georgescu (vocals); Robert Anghelescu (keyboards); Marian Saracu (drums)
- Website: www.beregratis.ro

Bere Gratis (Romanian for Free Beer) is a Romanian pop rock band formed in 1998 in Bucharest, Romania.

== Members ==
- Mihai 'Mitza' Georgescu (vocals)
- Robert Anghelescu (keyboards)
- Marian Damian (drums)

== Albums ==
- De vânzare (LP, 2000)
- Vino mai aproape (LP, 2001)
- Acolo sus (LP, 2003)
- Electrophonica (LP live, 2004)
- Post Restant (LP, 2005)
- Ediție de buzunar (EP, 2006)
- Where We Go/Rosy (EP, 2007, "Relief Studio" Fribourg, Switzerland)
- Revoluție de catifea (LP, 2007)
- Vacanță la Roma (Single, 2009)
- Live X (LP live, 2009)
- Pe marele ecran (LP, 2009)
- O colecție (LP, 2010)
- În fața ta (LP, 2012)
- Tonomatul de vise (LP, 2016)

== Videos ==
- Ce misto (2000)
- Ultra fete (2000)
- Unu Mai (2001)
- Señor, señor (2001)
- Vino mai aproape (2001)
- Nebun (2002)
- Strazi albastre (2003)
- La tine as vrea sa vin (2003)
- Poveste de oras (2003)
- Cineva mă iubeste (2004)
- Iti mai aduci aminte (2004)
- Eu nu am sa te las (2004)
- Campuri de lupta (2005)
- Post Restant (2005)
- Speranta din priviri (2006)
- In brate (2007)
- Curcubeu (2008)
- Stai pe acelasi drum (2010)

The videos were played on main Romanian musical TV channels (MTV Romania, Kiss TV, U TV Romania and Atomic TV since 2000).
