= United Kingdom in the Eurovision Song Contest 2014 =

- Eurovision Song Contest 2014
- Participating broadcaster: British Broadcasting Corporation (BBC)
- Country: United Kingdom
- Selection process: Internal selection
- Announcement date: 3 March 2014

Competing entry
- Song: "Children of the Universe"
- Artist: Molly
- Songwriters: Molly Smitten-Downes; Anders Hansson

Placement
- Final result: 17th, 40 points

Participation chronology

The United Kingdom was represented at the Eurovision Song Contest 2014 with the song "Children of the Universe" written by Molly Smitten-Downes and Anders Hansson, and performed by Molly. The British participating broadcaster, the British Broadcasting Corporation (BBC), internally selected both the song and the performer. Molly and "Children of the Universe" was announced as the British entry in a special presentation show titled The UK Launch broadcast on the BBC Red Button service in March 2014.

As a member of the "Big Five", the United Kingdom automatically qualified to compete in the final of the Eurovision Song Contest. Performing as the closing performance of the show in position 26, the United Kingdom placed 17th out of the 26 participating countries with 40 points.

== Background ==
Prior to the 2014 contest, the British Broadcasting Corporation (BBC) had participated in the Eurovision Song Contest representing the United Kingdom fifty-six times. Thus far, it has won the contest five times: in 1967 with the song "Puppet on a String" performed by Sandie Shaw, in 1969 with the song "Boom Bang-a-Bang" performed by Lulu, in 1976 with the song "Save Your Kisses for Me" performed by Brotherhood of Man, in 1981 with the song "Making Your Mind Up" performed by Bucks Fizz, and in 1997 with the song "Love Shine a Light" performed by Katrina and the Waves. To this point, the nation is noted for having finished as the runner-up in a record fifteen contests. Up to and including 1998, the UK had only twice finished outside the top 10, in 1978 and 1987. Since 1999, the year in which the rule was abandoned that songs must be performed in one of the official languages of the country participating, the UK has had less success, thus far only finishing within the top ten twice: in 2002 with the song "Come Back" performed by Jessica Garlick and in 2009 with the song "It's My Time" performed by Jade Ewen. For the 2013 contest, the United Kingdom finished in nineteenth place out of twenty-six competing entries with the song "Believe in Me" performed by Bonnie Tyler.

As part of its duties as participating broadcaster, the BBC organises the selection of its entry in the Eurovision Song Contest and broadcasts the event in the country. The broadcaster announced that it would participate in the 2014 contest on 1 October 2013. Between 2011 and 2013, BBC opted to internally select the British entry, a selection procedure that continued for their 2014 entry.

== Before Eurovision ==
=== Internal selection ===
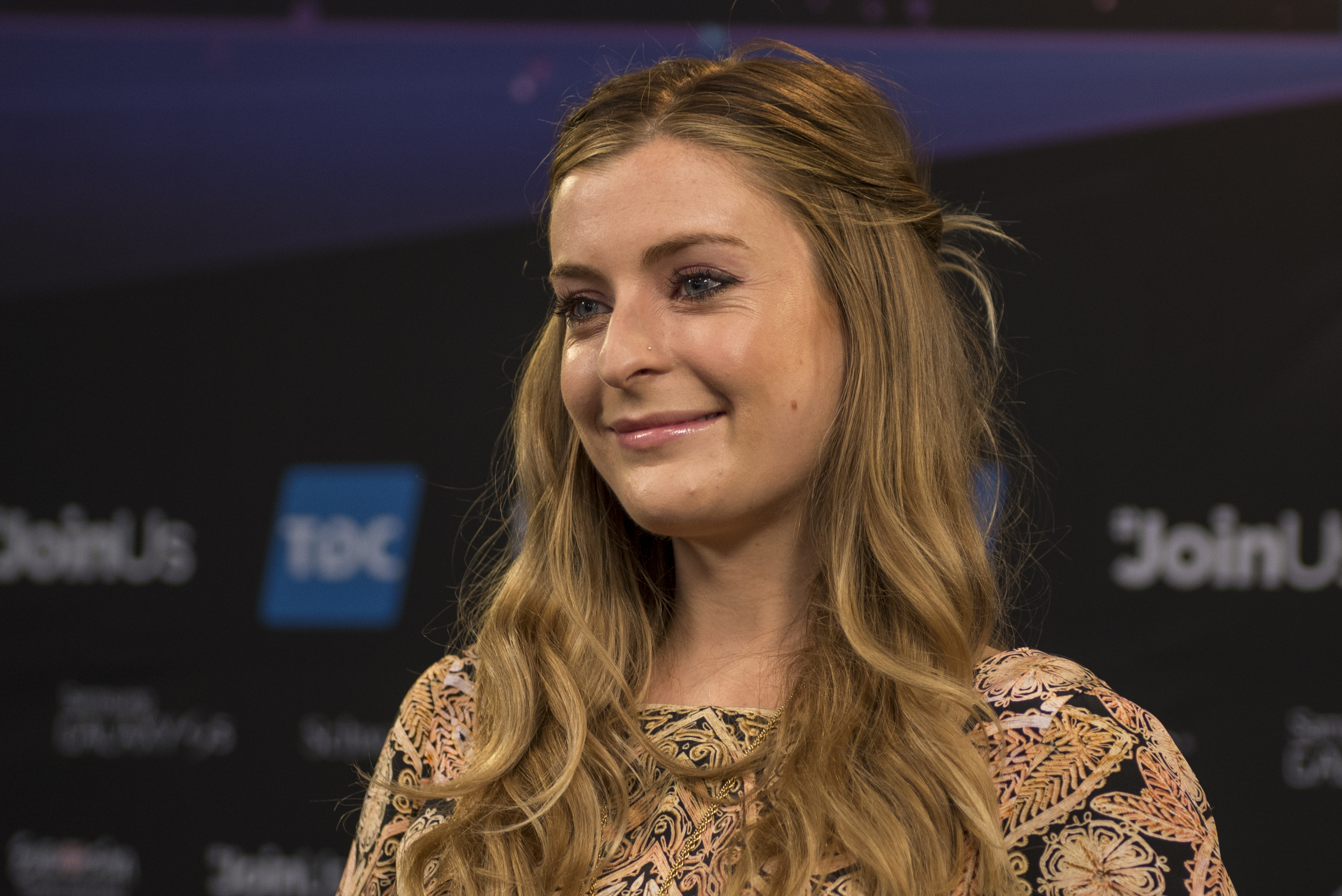
Molly was internally selected to represent the United Kingdom in the Eurovision Song Contest 2014

On 19 February 2014, BBC announced that the British entry for the Eurovision Song Contest 2014 would be selected internally from entries provided by record labels and music industry experts including writers, producers and artists, some of them which came from the BBC Introducing platform. On 28 February 2014, the British Eurovision executive producer and Head of Delegation Guy Freeman, who headed the selection process, revealed that the British artist and song would be revealed on 3 March 2014 on the BBC Red Button service.

On 3 March 2014, the song "Children of the Universe" written by Molly Smitten-Downes and Anders Hansson and performed by Smitten-Downes (under the mononym Molly) was revealed as the British entry during the show The UK Launch, hosted by Scott Mills on the BBC Red Button service. The show was also streamed online via the BBC iPlayer and the official Eurovision Song Contest website eurovision.tv. In regards to her selection as the British entrant, Molly stated: "To represent the United Kingdom in such a huge competition, not only as a singer and performer but as a songwriter is an unbelievable honour. I hope I can do us proud."

=== Promotion ===
Molly made several appearances across Europe to specifically promote "Children of the Universe" as the British Eurovision entry. On 31 March, Molly performed during the Eurovision in Concert event which was held at the Melkweg venue in Amsterdam, Netherlands and hosted by Cornald Maas and Sandra Reemer. In addition to her international appearances, on 15 April, Molly performed during the London Eurovision Party, which was held at the Café de Paris venue in London, United Kingdom and hosted by Nicki French and Paddy O'Connell. On 23 April, Molly performed at a solo concert which was held at the Madame Jojo's venue in London.

== At Eurovision ==
Video of Molly presenting herself and "Children of the Universe" at the Eurovision Song Contest 2014

According to Eurovision rules, all nations with the exceptions of the host country and the "Big Five" (France, Germany, Italy, Spain and the United Kingdom) are required to compete in one of two semi-finals, and qualify in order to participate in the final; the top ten countries from each semi-final progress to the final. As a member of the "Big 5", the United Kingdom automatically qualified to compete in the final on 10 May 2014. In addition to their participation in the final, the United Kingdom is also required to broadcast and vote in one of the two semi-finals. During the semi-final allocation draw on 20 January 2014, the United Kingdom was assigned to broadcast and vote in the second semi-final on 8 May 2014.

In the United Kingdom, the semi-finals were broadcast on BBC Three with commentary by Scott Mills and Laura Whitmore, while the second semi-final was also broadcast on BBC Radio 2 Eurovision, a pop-up DAB station, with commentary by Ana Matronic. The final was televised on BBC One with commentary by Graham Norton and broadcast on BBC Radio 2 and BBC Radio 2 Eurovision with commentary by Ken Bruce. The British spokesperson, who announced the British votes during the final, was Scott Mills.

=== Final ===
Molly took part in technical rehearsals on 4 and 6 May, followed by dress rehearsals on 9 and 10 May. This included the jury final on 9 May where the professional juries of each country watched and voted on the competing entries. During the British delegation's press conference on 6 May, Molly took part in a draw to determine in which half of the final the British entry would be performed. United Kingdom was drawn to compete in the second half. Following the conclusion of the second semi-final, the shows' producers decided upon the running order of the final. The running order for the semi-finals and final was decided by the shows' producers rather than through another draw, so that similar songs were not placed next to each other. United Kingdom was subsequently placed to perform last in position 26, following the entry from San Marino.

The British performance featured Molly performing in front of a stage set-up which included a drummer in the centre with two backing vocalists on each side. The LED screens displayed floral patterns and Chinese lanterns and the performance featured smoke effects and a pyrotechnic waterfall. The supporting performers that joined Molly for the performance were drummer Joe Yoshida and backing vocalists Lincoln Jean-Marie, Katie Holmes, Victoria Beaumont and Sharleen Linton. The United Kingdom placed seventeenth in the final, scoring 40 points.

=== Voting ===
Voting during the three shows involved each country awarding points from 1–8, 10 and 12 as determined by a combination of 50% national jury and 50% televoting. Each nation's jury consisted of five music industry professionals who are citizens of the country they represent, with their names published before the contest to ensure transparency. This jury judged each entry based on: vocal capacity; the stage performance; the song's composition and originality; and the overall impression by the act. In addition, no member of a national jury was permitted to be related in any way to any of the competing acts in such a way that they cannot vote impartially and independently. The individual rankings of each jury member as well as the nation's televoting results were released shortly after the grand final.

Following the release of the full split voting by the EBU after the conclusion of the competition, it was revealed that the United Kingdom had placed twenty-first with the public televote and sixteenth with the jury vote. In the public vote, the United Kingdom scored 29 points and in the jury vote the nation scored 52 points.

Below is a breakdown of points awarded to the United Kingdom and awarded by United Kingdom in the second semi-final and grand final of the contest, and the breakdown of the jury voting and televoting conducted during the two shows:

==== Points awarded to the United Kingdom ====
Points awarded to the United Kingdom (Final)
Score	Country
12 points	
10 points	
8 points	Ireland
7 points	Denmark
6 points	
5 points	San Marino; Spain
4 points	Iceland; Malta
3 points	Georgia; Norway
2 points	
1 point	Belgium

==== Points awarded by the United Kingdom ====
Points awarded by the United Kingdom (Semi-final 2)
Score	Country
12 points	Austria
10 points	Lithuania
8 points	Finland
7 points	Malta
6 points	Romania
5 points	Ireland
4 points	Poland
3 points	Switzerland
2 points	Slovenia
1 point	Greece

Points awarded by the United Kingdom (Final)
Score	Country
12 points	Austria
10 points	Malta
8 points	Netherlands
7 points	Sweden
6 points	Finland
5 points	Spain
4 points	Iceland
3 points	Denmark
2 points	Greece
1 point	Switzerland

==== Detailed voting results ====
The following members comprised the British jury:

- Carrie Grant (jury chairperson) – vocal coach, television presenter, public speaker, represented the United Kingdom in the 1983 contest as member of Sweet Dreams
- Stephen Allen – music producer, keyboard player, musical director, arranger
- Candice McKenzie – DJ, Radio Presenter
- Gus Gowland – writer, actor, composer
- Laura Wright – mezzo soprano

Detailed voting results from the United Kingdom (Semi-final 2)
R/O	Country	C. Grant	S. Allen	C. McKenzie	G. Gowland	L. Wright	Jury Rank	Televote Rank	Combined Rank	Points
01	Malta	8	1	1	4	5	3	7	4	7
02	Israel	7	14	10	8	9	13	10	13	
03	Norway	5	13	12	6	4	7	12	11	
04	Georgia	15	12	14	14	11	14	15	15	
05	Poland	14	15	15	15	15	15	1	7	4
06	Austria	1	3	9	2	2	2	3	1	12
07	Lithuania	13	5	6	3	7	5	2	2	10
08	Finland	4	6	3	1	1	1	8	3	8
09	Ireland	12	4	4	13	12	11	4	6	5
10	Belarus	10	2	13	9	8	9	11	12	
11	Macedonia	11	8	5	7	13	10	14	14	
12	Switzerland	9	7	11	5	10	8	9	8	3
13	Greece	3	11	7	11	14	12	6	10	1
14	Slovenia	2	10	2	12	3	4	13	9	2
15	Romania	6	9	8	10	6	6	5	5	6

Detailed voting results from the United Kingdom (Final)
R/O	Country	C. Grant	S. Allen	C. McKenzie	G. Gowland	L. Wright	Jury Rank	Televote Rank	Combined Rank	Points
01	Ukraine	22	16	20	18	7	18	12	16	
02	Belarus	17	7	17	25	19	19	19	21	
03	Azerbaijan	5	4	25	13	6	8	24	18	
04	Iceland	8	14	22	14	13	15	4	7	4
05	Norway	7	22	19	11	5	11	17	13	
06	Romania	19	11	18	20	22	22	9	17	
07	Armenia	20	24	23	16	18	24	16	23	
08	Montenegro	16	10	15	23	24	21	25	25	
09	Poland	25	25	24	24	25	25	1	11	
10	Greece	13	18	8	6	23	14	7	9	2
11	Austria	1	8	9	2	4	3	3	1	12
12	Germany	18	21	16	9	8	16	20	19	
13	Sweden	6	12	10	3	1	5	8	4	7
14	France	24	23	12	17	21	23	15	20	
15	Russia	14	9	6	19	14	10	18	14	
16	Italy	23	19	7	12	15	17	22	22	
17	Slovenia	4	6	4	8	16	6	23	15	
18	Finland	2	13	3	1	3	2	11	5	6
19	Spain	12	3	1	5	10	4	10	6	5
20	Switzerland	11	17	11	7	12	9	13	10	1
21	Hungary	15	15	13	10	11	12	14	12	
22	Malta	3	2	2	4	9	1	5	2	10
23	Denmark	10	5	14	21	17	13	6	8	3
24	Netherlands	9	1	5	15	20	7	2	3	8
25	San Marino	21	20	21	22	2	20	21	24	
26	United Kingdom									
