= Hazel Kaneswaran =

Irish musician (born 1977)

கசெல் கணேசுவரன் Hazel Kaneswaran
- Born: 1977 (age 47–48); Blanchardstown, Ireland
- Genres: Pop, soul, R&B
- Occupation(s): Singer-songwriter, recording artist, television personality
- Years active: 1996–present
- Website: hazelkaneswaran.ie

Hazel Kaneswaran (born 1977) is an Irish recording artist, singer-songwriter and television personality who has been involved in the Irish music industry since 1996. Among her siblings are model Gail and singers Siva of the group The Wanted and David of the band Zoo.

== Early life ==
Kaneswaran was born and raised in Blanchardstown, Dublin by her Singaporean father of Sri Lankan Tamil descent and Irish mother. Her father worked as a local window cleaner. It was through him that she acquired her love of soul music. When her father died suddenly, aged 44, responsibility fell to Hazel, helping her mother to raise her six younger brothers as well as supporting the family financially through her job as an assembly line worker at a Thermo King refrigerator factory.

== Dove ==
Hearing about Kaneswaran through her sister, Gail, rapper and choreographer Graham Cruz contacted Hazel to collaborate. Along with Donald Ade-Onojobi, they formed the soul-pop act called Dubh which is the Irish language word for "black". After finding that people found this name difficult to pronounce, they soon changed it to the similar-sounding "Dove". Dove's most successful record, "Don't Dream", a cover of Crowded House's 1986 hit "Don't Dream It's Over" was released on 16 August 1999 by ZTT Records. "Don't Dream" reached number 6 in the Irish charts while Dove were nominated for three awards at the 1999 Hot Press Awards for Best Single, Best Pop Act and Best New Act While successful in Ireland, "Don't Dream" failed to replicate this success in the UK and was the last release by Dove under ZTT Records.

== Popstars: The Rivals ==
In 2002, Kaneswaran, who was pregnant at the time, travelled to Glasgow to audition for ITV1's televised musical talent show "Popstars: The Rivals". After impressing judges Louis Walsh and Geri Halliwell with her version of Joan Armatrading's "Love And Affection", Kaneswaran initially qualified for the final round of competition. However, when it transpired that she was ten days older than the maximum age limit for the auditions, she was disqualified from competing. Soon afterwards, she gave birth to her baby boy in October 2002. The eventual winners of Popstars: The Rivals went on to form the girl band Girls Aloud, with Kimberley Walsh taking Kaneswaran's place. She remained on good terms with Louis Walsh, with the producer asking her to write songs for Jedward.

== Television personality ==
Kaneswaran made the transition from singer to judge on the third season of television station Raidió Teilifís Éireann's You're A Star in 2004. She was also one of the presenters at the 2005 Meteor Ireland Music Awards. Other notable television appearances include Off The Rails, Harry Hill's TV Burp and The Panel.

== Eurosong and Eurovision 2014 ==
In November 2013, it was announced that Kaneswaran would mentor an act for the Eurosong 2014, Ireland's national final for the Eurovision Song Contest 2014. On 5 February 2014, it was announced that she had chosen an Irish singer Can-linn featuring the vocals of singer Kasey Smith (from the band Wonderland) as her entry. Can-linn's first single, "Heartbeat", was released on iTunes on 21 February 2014 by HK Records. The song went on to win the national final and represented Ireland in the Eurovision Song Contest 2014 in Copenhagen.

== Charity work ==
She raised money with other "Dove" members in May 2000 for the People in Need Trust by exchanging kisses for donations on Grafton Street in Dublin, as well as taking part in that year's telethon.

In September 2010, she joined former Miss World Rosanna Davison, TV3 television presenter Sinead Desmond, and "Fair City" actor Martina Stanley, to take part in the Irish Heart Foundation's "Go Red For Women" campaign which sought to raise awareness of cardiovascular disease in women.

In 2010, she took part in a campaign encouraging Irish businesses to donate a portion of their sales profits to the GI Unit at Our Lady's Children's Hospital, Crumlin.
