= Austria in the Eurovision Song Contest 2014 =

- Eurovision Song Contest 2014
- Participating broadcaster: Österreichischer Rundfunk (ORF)
- Country: Austria
- Selection process: Internal selection
- Announcement date: Artist: 10 September 2013; Song: 18 March 2014

Competing entry
- Song: "Rise Like a Phoenix"
- Artist: Conchita Wurst
- Songwriters: Charlie Mason; Joey Patulka; Ali Zuckowski; Julian Maas

Placement
- Semi-final result: Qualified (1st, 169 points)
- Final result: 1st, 290 points

Participation chronology

Austria was represented at the Eurovision Song Contest 2014 with the song "Rise Like a Phoenix", written by Charlie Mason, Joey Patulka, Ali Zuckowski, and Julian Maas, and performed by Thomas Neuwirth under the drag stage persona Conchita Wurst. The Austrian participating broadcaster, Österreichischer Rundfunk (ORF), internally selected its entry for the contest. The broadcaster announced Wurst's selection in September 2013, with the song presented to the public in March 2014. Wurst had risen to fame after taking part in an Austrian talent show in 2011 and attempting to represent Austria in 2012.

After a promotional tour of several European countries, Austria was seen as one of the countries most likely to qualify for the grand final. In the second of the Eurovision semi-finals "Rise Like a Phoenix" came first of the 15 participating countries, securing its place among the 26 other countries in the final. In Austria's forty-seventh Eurovision appearance on 10 May, "Rise Like a Phoenix" became the sixty-second song to win the Eurovision Song Contest, receiving a total of 290 points and full marks from thirteen countries. This was Austria's second win in the contest, having previously won in 1966, 48 years prior; this is the longest gap between two Eurovision wins of a country to this day.

After the show, the song went on to chart in several European countries, reaching number one in Austria and the UK Indie Chart, as well as reaching the top 10 in a further 10 countries. Wurst's appearance in the contest brought about both criticism and praise: by some of the more socially conservative sections of European society her victory in the contest was condemned as a promotion of LGBT rights; conversely the international attention received by Wurst's victory firmly established her among the LGBT community, leading her to take an active role in promoting tolerance and respect, and resulted in several invites to perform at several European pride events, as well as performances at the European Parliament and United Nations Office at Vienna.

== Background ==
Prior to the 2014 contest, Österreichischer Rundfunk (ORF) had participated in the Eurovision Song Contest representing Austria forty-six times since its first entry in 1957, winning the contest in 1966 with the song "Merci, Chérie" performed by Udo Jürgens. Following the introduction of semi-finals for the 2004, Austria had featured in only two finals. Its least successful result has been last place, achieved on eight occasions, most recently in 2012. Austria has also received nul points on three occasions; in 1962, 1988 and 1991.

As part of its duties as participating broadcaster, ORF organises the selection of its entry in the Eurovision Song Contest and broadcasts the event in the country. From 2011 to 2013, ORF had set up national finals with several artists to choose both the song and performer to compete at Eurovision for Austria, with both the public and a panel of jury members involved in the selection. ORF confirmed its intentions to participate at the 2014 contest on 6 September 2013. For the 2014 contest, it held an internal selection to choose the artist and song for the first time since 2007.

== Before Eurovision ==
=== Internal selection ===
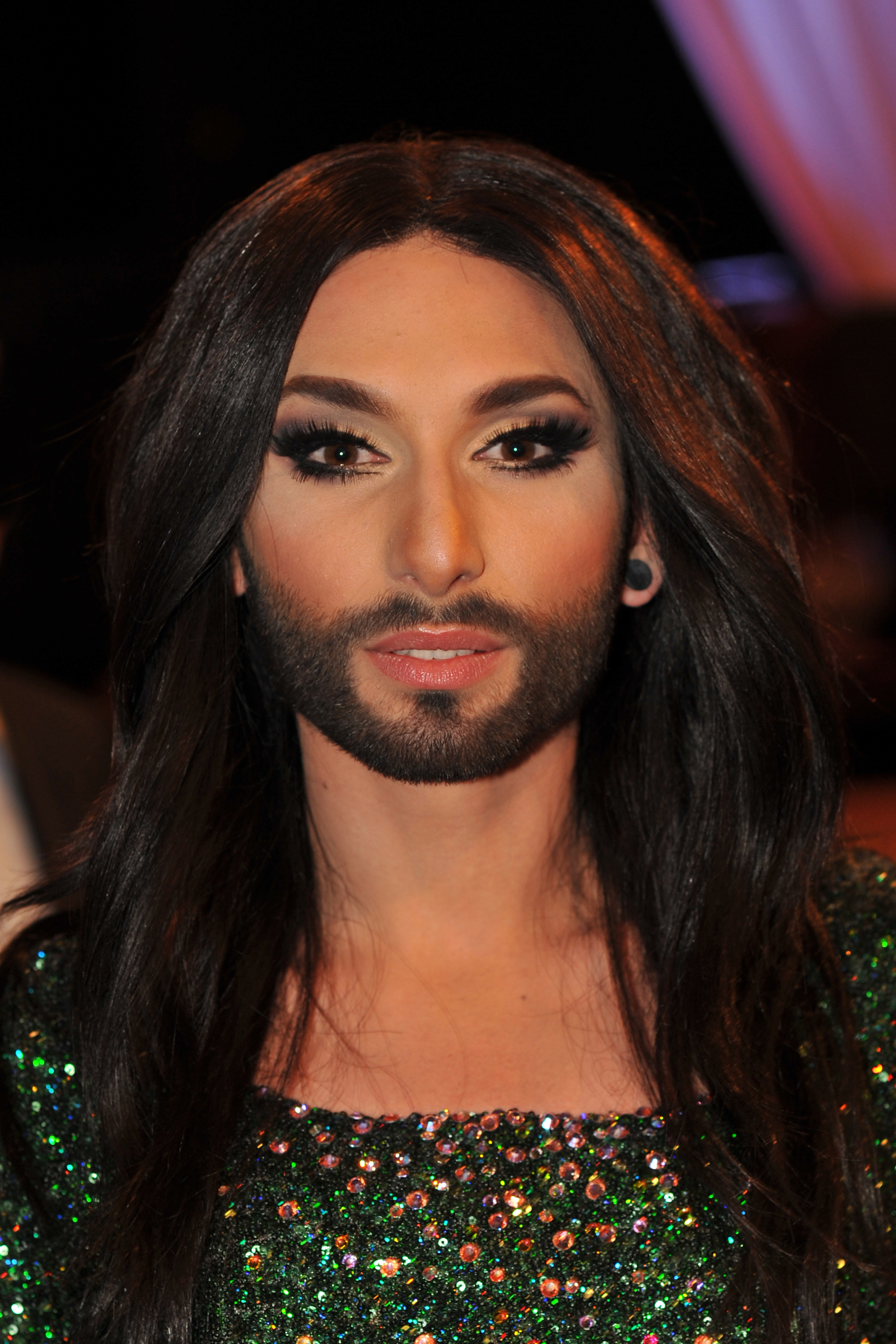
Conchita Wurst at Austria's Dancing Stars

On 10 September 2013, the broadcaster announced that they had internally selected Conchita Wurst to represent Austria in Copenhagen. Wurst is the drag stage persona of Tom Neuwirth, who in 2007 finished second in the third season of Austrian talent show Starmania, behind Nadine Beiler, who represented Austria in 2011. Neuwirth went on to join the boy band Jetzt Anders! along with other contestants from Starmania in 2007, which disbanded later that year. Following this, Neuwirth, who uses masculine pronouns when referring to himself but feminine pronouns to describe Wurst, developed his new drag persona and appeared on ORF's talent show Die große Chance (The Big Opportunity) as Wurst in 2011, achieving sixth place. Wurst went on to compete in the Austrian selection for the Eurovision Song Contest 2012 with the song "That's What I Am", qualifying for the second round and finishing second with 49% of the public vote.

ORF confirmed in October 2013 that the song to be performed by Wurst at the contest would also be chosen internally. On 18 March 2014, at an ORF press conference in Vienna, the song "Rise Like a Phoenix" was announced as the Austrian entry for the contest. The song was written by Charlie Mason, Joey Patulka, Ali Zuckowski and Julian Maas, and was selected by Wurst and her team from more than 100 submissions from national and international composers and producers nominated by ORF. Wurst's first live performance of the song was on 22 March 2014, during an episode of Dancing Stars, the Austrian version of international franchise Dancing with the Stars.

=== Controversy ===
The selection of Wurst caused some controversy in Austria and the rest of Europe. A Facebook group which amassed approximately 38,000 members protested the decision by the publicly funded broadcaster ORF, to internally select the country's Eurovision act without a public vote. In an interview with Austrian newspaper Kurier, Wurst defended her internal selection by ORF, noting that the broadcaster had the sole responsibility of making decisions regarding the contest and that the 2007 internal selection of Eric Papilaya received no backlash from the Austrian public. Wurst also claimed that the criticism from the group surpassed protest against her as the selected artist and instead "displayed homophobic statements and discrimination", and she vowed to "continue fighting against discrimination" in response to the Facebook group.

Wurst's selection for Eurovision also sparked outrage outside of Austria; in Belarus, a petition by more than 2,000 people petitioned the Belarusian Ministry of Information to prevent the contest from being broadcast in the country, claiming it to being "a hotbed of sodomy" and an attempt by European liberals to impose Western values on Belarus and Russia. A similar petition of more than 15,000 signatures was also received by the Russian Ministry of Communications and Mass Media from the "All-Russian parenting group", claiming that Wurst "leads the lifestyle inapplicable [sic] for Russians" Wurst also received criticism from the Armenian representative, Aram Mp3, who claimed that her lifestyle was "not natural" and that she should "eventually decide whether she is a woman or a man". Aram Mp3 later apologised and insisted his statements were "a joke". In response to petitions in Russia, Belarus, and Ukraine asking for Wurst to be removed from the competition, some of the other 2014 participants gave Wurst their support. Irish representative Kasey Smith, said that "everyone should be allowed in" to Eurovision and that she "totally disagree[s] with what they are doing. It's homophobia."

=== Promotion ===
Before her appearance at the contest, Wurst went on a promotional tour, performing in several European countries. Prior to her song selection, Wurst appeared at a Eurovision fan event in Vienna in October 2013 held by the Austrian branch of OGAE, an international organisation of Eurovision fan clubs across Europe and beyond, where she shared the stage with Anne-Marie David, who won Eurovision for Luxembourg in 1973. On 28 March Wurst appeared at the 2014 Euroschlager Party, held by OGAE Spain, in Madrid. On 29 March 2014, Wurst was a guest at the "Eurovision Pre-Party Riga" in Latvia, appearing alongside Donatan and Cleo (who would represent Poland in 2014) and PeR (who represented Latvia in 2013). Wurst was also one of 26 acts from the 2014 contest to perform during the 2014 Eurovision in Concert, the largest gathering of Eurovision artists outside of Eurovision itself, held in the Melkweg, a popular music venue in Amsterdam, the Netherlands on 5 April 2014. This was followed by an appearance at the London Preview Party alongside 15 other participating entries from 2014, held at the Café de Paris nightclub in London on 13 April. Wurst also took part in several interviews and performances on Irish, Belgian and Dutch television networks. In the run-up to the contest, Wurst asked her fans to take part in a campaign called "Knit for Tolerance", in which they would wear knitted beards in a display of tolerance and respect, also promising that she would take all beards that she received with her to Copenhagen.

== At Eurovision ==
Wurst presenting herself during the Eurovision Song Contest 2014

According to Eurovision rules, all nations with the exceptions of the host country and the "Big Five" (France, Germany, Italy, Spain, and the United Kingdom) are required to qualify from one of two semi-finals in order to compete for the final; the top ten countries from each semi-final progress to the final. The European Broadcasting Union (EBU) split up the competing countries into six different pots based on voting patterns from previous contests, with countries with favourable voting histories put into the same pot. On 20 January 2014, a special allocation draw was held which placed each country into one of the two semi-finals, as well as which half of the show they would perform in. Austria was placed into the second semi-final, to be held on 8 May 2014, and was scheduled to perform in the first half of the show.

As part of the contest's graphic design, special postcards were commissioned by the Danish host broadcaster DR to introduce each of the participating countries before the acts took to the stage. For the 2014 contest the contestants were asked to take a photo of their country's flag, made in a creative way. Austria's postcard was the first to be filmed by DR, and was shot at the Schönbrunn Palace in Vienna featuring Wurst and her stylist Tamara Mascara creating the Austrian flag out of 70 baroque-style dresses.

Once all the competing songs for the 2014 contest had been released, the running order for the semi-finals was decided by the shows' producers rather than through another draw, so that similar songs were not placed next to each other. Austria was set to perform in position 6, following the entry from Poland and before the entry from Lithuania. All three shows were broadcast on ORF eins, with commentary by Andi Knoll. ORF appointed Kati Bellowitsch as its spokesperson to announce the Austrian votes during the final.

=== Semi-final ===
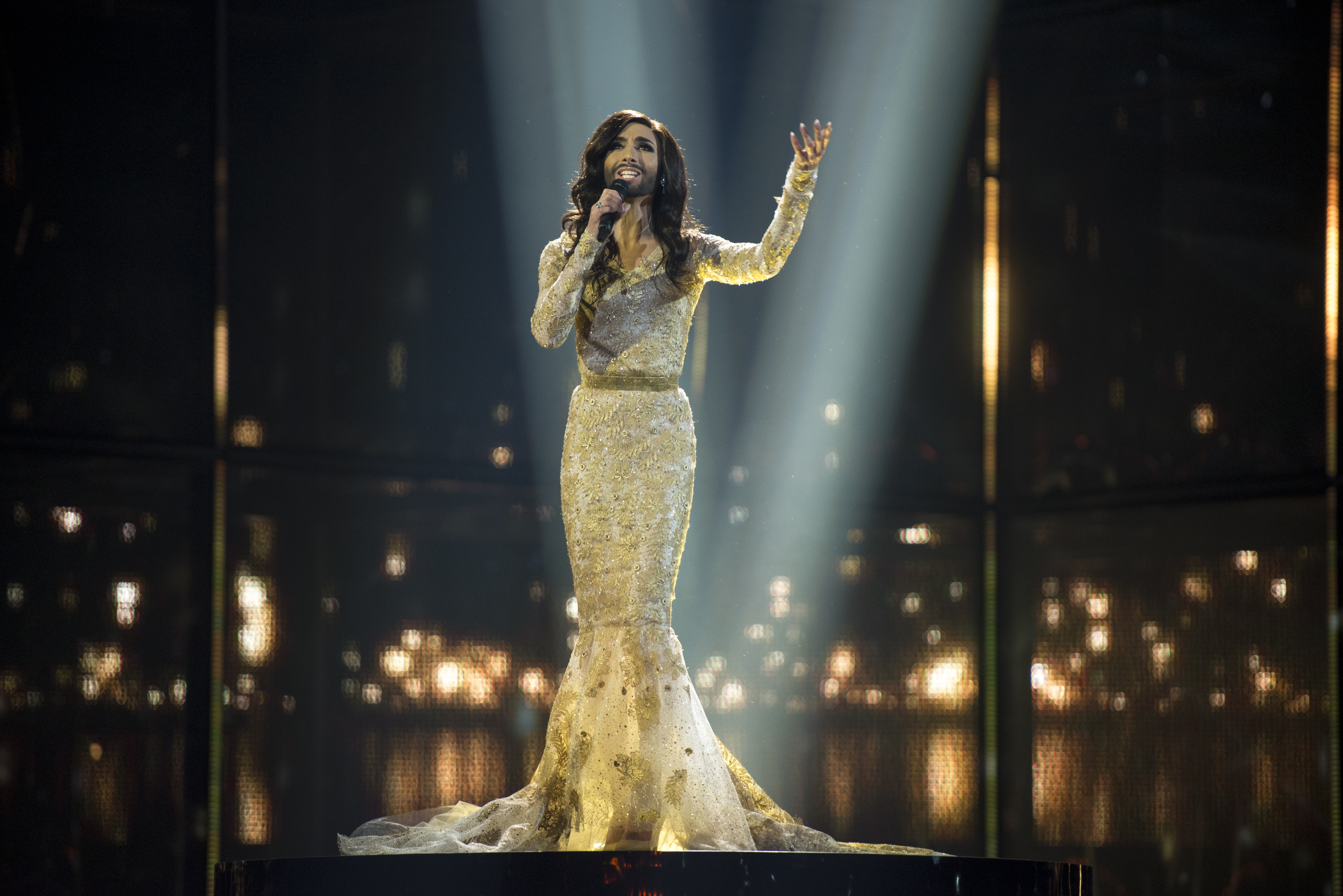
Wurst at a dress rehearsal for the second semi-final

Wurst took part in technical rehearsals on 30 April and 3 May, followed by dress rehearsals on 7 and 8 May. This included the jury final where professional juries of each country, responsible for 50 percent of each country's vote, watched and voted on the competing entries.

The stage show featured Wurst in a gold mermaid-style dress standing on a pedestal in the middle of the stage. The stage appeared dark at the beginning of the song with minimal lighting, before the lighting rose towards the beginning of the first chorus. The song also began with the camera at the back of the arena before zooming into centre stage to a close-up of Wurst, followed by it flying off again at the beginning of the chorus. The background LED screens displayed flaming rain at the first chorus, followed by flames in the shape of wings, in reference to the phoenix in the title of the song. Pyrotechnic flames also featured at the end of the song. Wind machines were also used during the performance.

At the end of the show, it was announced that Austria had finished in the top 10 and thus qualifying for the grand final; it was the last qualifying country to be announced by the show's hosts, Pilou Asbæk and Nikolaj Koppel. It was later revealed that Austria had won the semi-final, receiving a total of 169 points.

=== Final ===
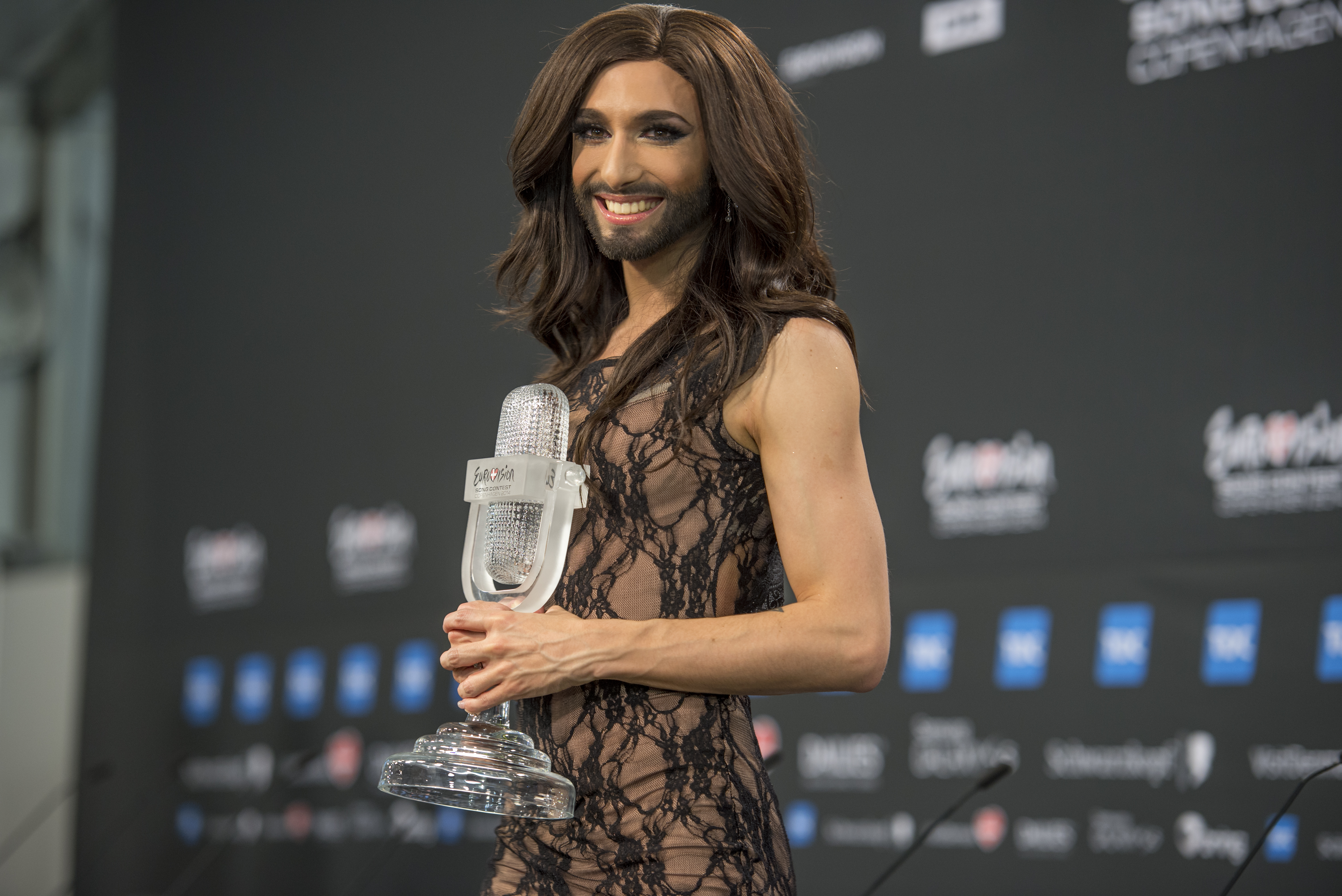
Wurst with the winner's trophy at the winner's press conference

Shortly after the second semi-final, a winner's press conference was held for the ten qualifying countries. As part of this press conference, the qualifying artists took part in a draw to determine which half of the grand final they would subsequently participate in. This draw was done in the order the countries were announced during the semi-final. Austria was drawn to compete in the first half. Following this draw, the shows' producers decided upon the running order of the final, as they had done for the semi-finals. Austria was subsequently placed to perform in position 11, following the entry from Greece and before the entry from Germany. On the day of the grand final, Austria was considered by bookmakers to be the second most likely to win the competition, placed only behind the entry from Sweden.

Wurst once again took part in dress rehearsals on 9 and 10 May before the final, including the jury final where the professional juries cast their final votes before the live show. Wurst performed a repeat of her semi-final performance during the final on 10 May. After a slow start, Austria eventually took the lead in the voting and won the competition with 290 points, beating the Netherlands and Sweden into second and third places respectively. Austria received 12 points, the maximum number of points a country can give to another country, from thirteen countries. The broadcast was watched by an average 1.3 million people in Austria, receiving a 54.4 percent market share.

==== Marcel Bezençon Awards ====
The Marcel Bezençon Awards, first awarded during the 2002 contest, are awards honouring the best competing songs in the final each year. Named after the creator of the annual contest, Marcel Bezençon, the awards are divided into three categories: the Press Award, given to the best entry as voted on by the accredited media and press during the event; the Artistic Award, presented to the best artist as voted on by the shows' commentators; and the Composer Award, given to the best and most original composition as voted by the participating composers. "Rise Like a Phoenix" was awarded the Press Award, which was accepted at the awards ceremony by Kathrin Zechner, ORF's Managing Director.

=== Voting ===
Voting during the three shows consisted of 50 percent public televoting and 50 percent from a jury deliberation. The jury consisted of five music industry professionals who were citizens of the country they represent, with their names published before the contest to ensure transparency. This jury was asked to judge each contestant based on vocal capacity, the stage performance, the song's composition and originality, and the overall impression of the act. In addition, no member of a national jury could be related in any way to any of the competing acts in such a way that they could not vote impartially and independently. The individual rankings of each jury member were released shortly after the grand final.

Below is a breakdown of points awarded to Austria and awarded by Austria in the second semi-final and grand final of the contest, and the breakdown of the jury voting and televoting conducted during the two shows:

==== Points awarded to Austria ====
Points awarded to Austria (Semi-final 2)
Score	Country
12 points	Finland; Greece; Ireland; Italy; Romania; Switzerland; United Kingdom
10 points	Georgia; Israel; Lithuania; Malta; Poland; Slovenia
8 points	Norway
7 points	Belarus
6 points	Macedonia
5 points	
4 points	Germany
3 points	
2 points	
1 point	

Points awarded to Austria (Final)
Score	Country
12 points	Belgium; Finland; Greece; Ireland; Israel; Italy; Netherlands; Portugal; Slovenia; Spain; Sweden; Switzerland; United Kingdom
10 points	Georgia; France; Hungary; Iceland; Lithuania; Malta; Norway
8 points	Denmark; Romania; Ukraine
7 points	Germany; Moldova
6 points	Latvia
5 points	Albania; Russia
4 points	Estonia
3 points	Macedonia
2 points	Montenegro
1 point	Azerbaijan

==== Points awarded by Austria ====
Points awarded by Austria (Semi-final 2)
Score	Country
12 points	Romania
10 points	Belarus
8 points	Finland
7 points	Slovenia
6 points	Switzerland
5 points	Norway
4 points	Ireland
3 points	Greece
2 points	Poland
1 point	Malta

Points awarded by Austria (Final)
Score	Country
12 points	Armenia
10 points	Netherlands
8 points	Romania
7 points	Hungary
6 points	Sweden
5 points	Ukraine
4 points	Finland
3 points	Switzerland
2 points	Iceland
1 point	Norway

==== Detailed voting results ====
The following members comprised the Austrian jury:

- Stella Jones (jury chairperson) – singer, songwriter, vocal-stagecoach, represented Austria in 1995
- Michael Dörfler – producer and owner of a sound studio
- Dietmar Lienbacher – Division Head Austria Sony Music
- Diana Lueger – singer, musician, songwriter
- Alexander Kahr – producer

Detailed voting results from Austria (Semi-final 2)
R/O	Country	S. Jones	M. Dörfler	D. Lienbacher	D. Lueger	A. Kahr	Jury Rank	Televote Rank	Combined Rank	Points
01	Malta	13	7	2	7	12	10	10	10	1
02	Israel	14	8	3	10	11	11	11	12	
03	Norway	11	1	1	11	10	6	6	6	5
04	Georgia	3	12	13	14	14	13	14	14	
05	Poland	5	9	6	13	13	12	2	9	2
06	Austria									
07	Lithuania	12	11	14	12	8	14	13	13	
08	Finland	6	3	4	4	5	2	7	3	8
09	Ireland	7	5	5	3	9	3	9	7	4
10	Belarus	4	6	7	9	4	4	5	2	10
11	Macedonia	8	13	12	5	1	8	12	11	
12	Switzerland	9	14	8	2	7	9	3	5	6
13	Greece	2	10	10	6	3	5	8	8	3
14	Slovenia	10	4	11	8	6	7	4	4	7
15	Romania	1	2	9	1	2	1	1	1	12

Detailed voting results from Austria (Final)
R/O	Country	S. Jones	M. Dörfler	D. Lienbacher	D. Lueger	A. Kahr	Jury Rank	Televote Rank	Combined Rank	Points
01	Ukraine	4	11	11	9	10	6	12	6	5
02	Belarus	15	17	20	21	8	19	19	20	
03	Azerbaijan	25	6	16	14	23	20	25	24	
04	Iceland	14	18	10	11	13	12	8	9	2
05	Norway	23	10	5	12	12	11	9	10	1
06	Romania	10	8	6	1	17	5	4	3	8
07	Armenia	21	1	1	2	1	3	2	1	12
08	Montenegro	17	16	17	22	21	22	17	21	
09	Poland	18	19	19	20	20	24	3	13	
10	Greece	19	25	18	13	9	21	14	19	
11	Austria									
12	Germany	6	14	15	19	24	16	5	12	
13	Sweden	3	3	2	3	4	1	10	5	6
14	France	7	20	21	7	6	10	23	18	
15	Russia	24	5	22	10	16	15	18	17	
16	Italy	22	13	24	18	19	23	20	23	
17	Slovenia	12	9	14	6	11	9	11	11	
18	Finland	2	2	9	4	3	2	16	7	4
19	Spain	8	7	13	16	7	8	21	15	
20	Switzerland	9	21	23	5	14	13	6	8	3
21	Hungary	20	4	4	8	5	4	7	4	7
22	Malta	16	12	8	15	22	14	15	14	
23	Denmark	13	22	7	23	15	18	13	16	
24	Netherlands	11	15	3	17	2	7	1	2	10
25	San Marino	5	23	25	25	25	25	24	25	
26	United Kingdom	1	24	12	24	18	17	22	22	

== After Eurovision ==
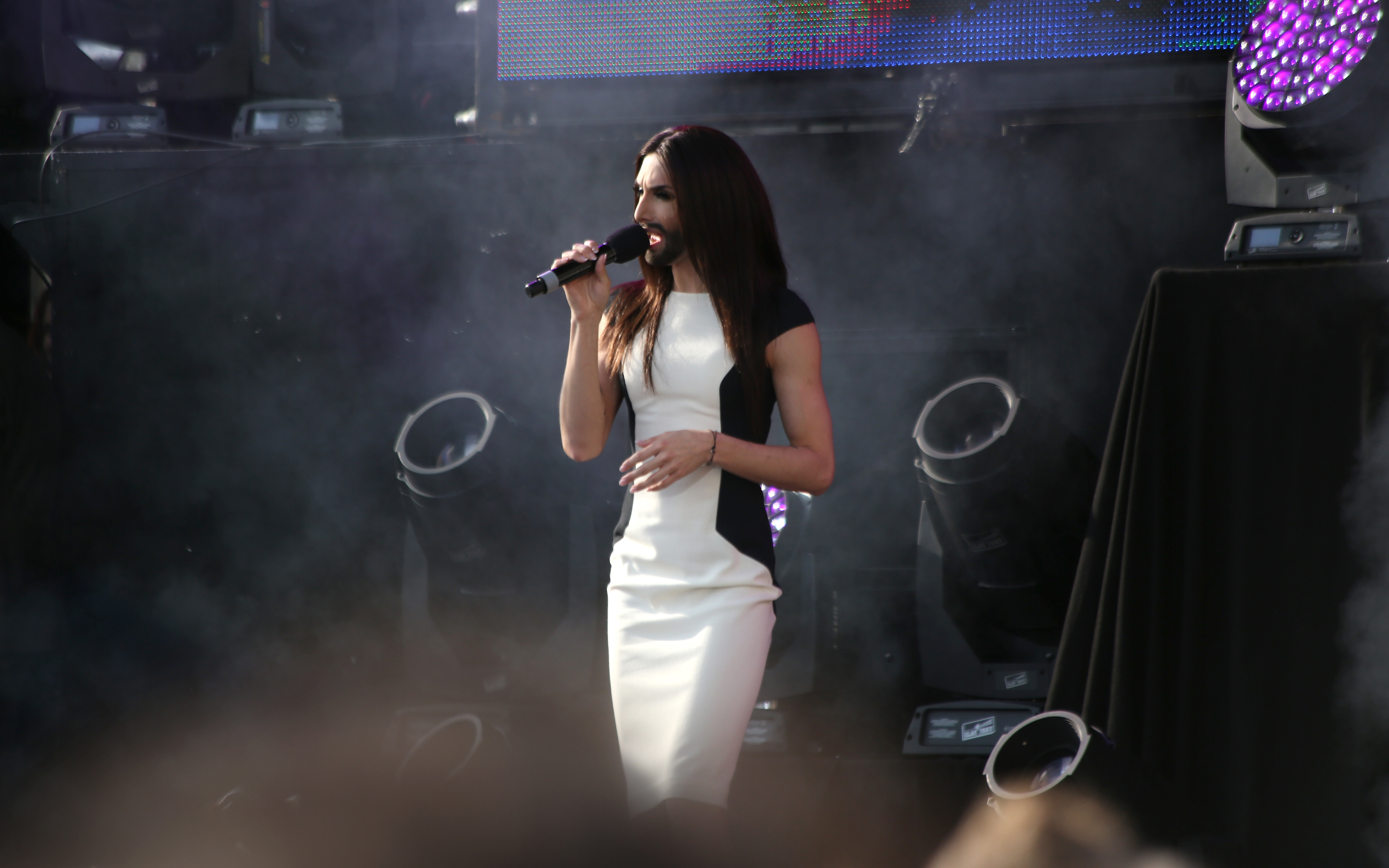
Wurst performing at Vienna's Ballhausplatz

As the winners of the 2014 contest, Austria was given the responsibility of hosting the 2015 contest. Shortly after the 2014 final, ORF confirmed the preliminary dates for the 2015 contest, as well as that several cities in Austria were competing to host the 60th edition of the Eurovision Song Contest. After a competition was held to determine the host venue, three cities were short-listed by ORF: Vienna; Innsbruck; and Graz. On 6 August it was announced that the Wiener Stadthalle in Vienna would host the 2015 contest, scheduled to be held on 19, 21 and 23 May 2015. On 19 December 2014, the hosts of the contest were announced, with Wurst taking on the role of green room host for the event.

On Wurst's return to Austria after winning Eurovision, she was greeted at Vienna International Airport by thousands of fans and hundreds journalists celebrating her victory. On 18 May she met with Werner Faymann, the Chancellor of Austria and Josef Ostermayer, the Minister of Arts, Culture, and Media at an official reception, followed by a performance on stage at Vienna's Ballhausplatz to an audience of thousands of fans. The concert was however criticised by the conservative Austrian People's Party, a member of the coalition government.

"Rise Like a Phoenix" went on to become a hit across Europe, reaching the top 3 in iTunes download charts in fourteen countries, including both Belarus and Russia, where she had courted controversy before the contest. The song also reached the top 10 in charts in twelve countries, including number one in Austria and the UK Indie Chart.

Wurst received both praise and criticism following her victory. Many celebrities sent their congratulations and support to Wurst via Twitter and other means, including Elton John, Cher, Lady Gaga, Boy George and Robbie Williams, as well as from fellow Eurovision winners Alexander Rybak, Emmelie de Forest, Lena Meyer-Landrut and Charlotte Perrelli. However her victory was also met with negative reaction by some more conservative sections of European society. In Turkey, which had not taken part in the contest since 2012, the government party AKP criticised Wurst's win, with then-Prime Minister of Turkey Recep Tayyip Erdoğan vowing that Turkey would never take part in the contest again and his colleague Volkan Bozkır proclaiming "Thank god we no longer participate in Eurovision".

Church leaders in the Balkans have also claimed that Wurst's win is responsible for floods in south-east Europe in May 2014, which left over 60 people dead. Metropolitan Amfilohije, the Montenegrin patriarch of the Serbian Orthodox Church claimed that "this [flood] is not a coincidence, but a warning" and a "reminder that people should not join the wild side", Patriarch Irinej, the spiritual leader of Eastern Orthodox Serbs has reportedly said the floods are "divine punishment for their vices" and that "God is thus washing Serbia of its sins". Wurst had previously been condemned by the Russian Orthodox Church. However Fr. Michael Unger, Tom Neuwirth's childhood Catholic priest, condemned the homophobic backlash against him, and said that he is "just happy that he's happy".

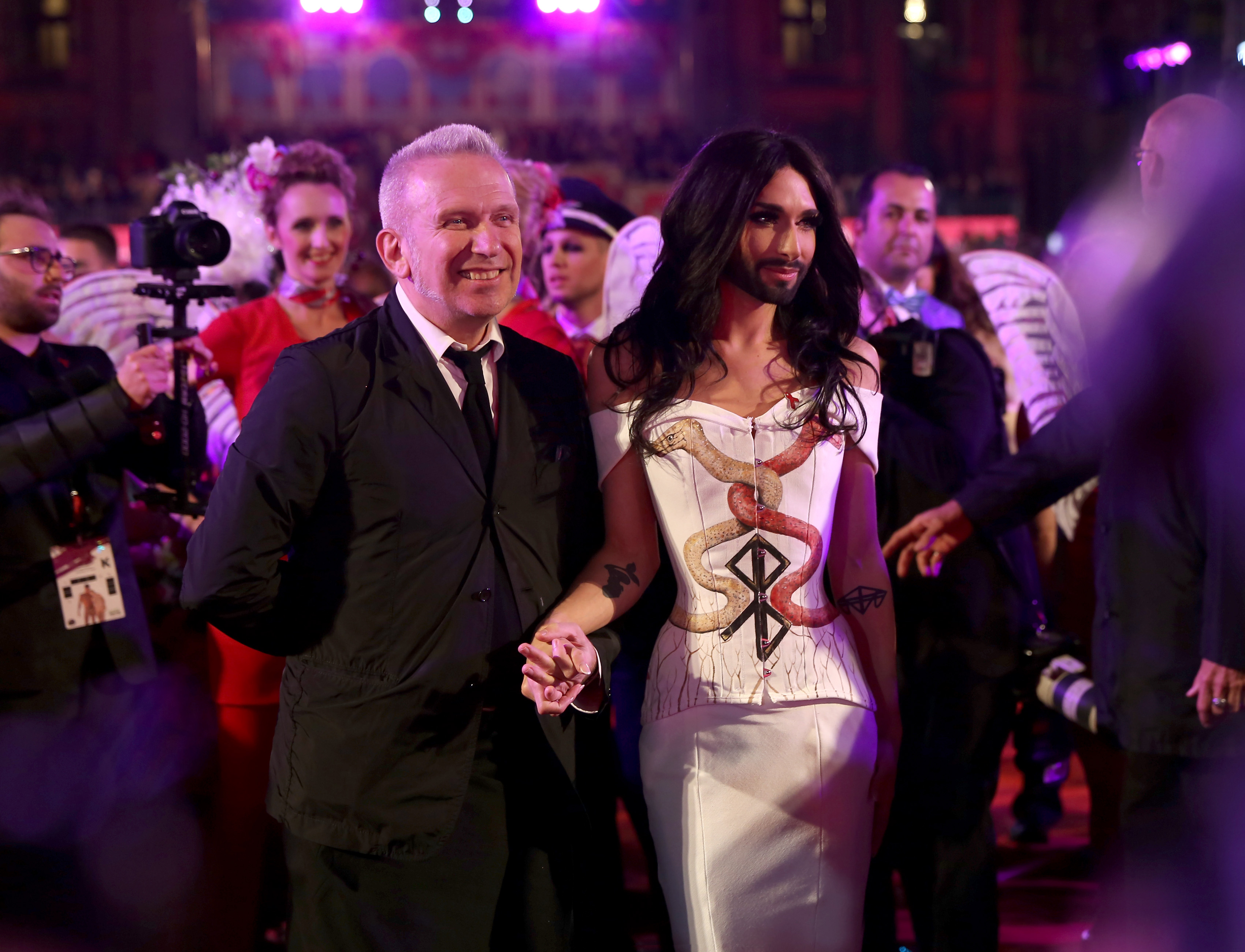
Conchita Wurst and Jean Paul Gaultier at the Vienna Life Ball

In the wake of her Eurovision win, Wurst was invited onto several television programmes across Europe. Wurst appeared as a guest on several BBC programmes in the United Kingdom; including The Graham Norton Show on 16 May, a chat show hosted by British commentator Graham Norton; and on 23 May 2014 she appeared on The One Show and Newsnight. Wurst was invited onto the German talk show TV total on 4 June 2014, hosted by former Eurovision contestant and host Stefan Raab, and was in demand by German broadcaster RTL as a new personality for their upcoming reality shows. Wurst also performed on the popular Swedish show Allsång på Skansen in July 2014.

In June 2014, Wurst headlined the Vienna Life Ball, Europe's biggest charity event supporting people with HIV and AIDS, attending the event in a dress designed by Jean Paul Gaultier. Wurst has since modelled for both Gautier and Karl Lagerfeld at several events.

Both before and after her Eurovision win, Wurst had become very involved with the LGBT community. In June 2014 Wurst recorded a message for the It Gets Better Project, an Internet-based project devoted to preventing suicide among LGBT youth by having gay adults convey the message that their lives will improve, and to inspire change required to make life better for them. Wurst was also invited to perform at several pride events in several cities across Europe, including in Stockholm, Zürich, Dublin, Berlin, Madrid, Amsterdam, London and Manchester among others. In October 2014, British gay lifestyle magazine Attitude awarded Wurst with the 'Moment of the Year' award for her win at Eurovision as part of the 2014 Attitude Awards.

In October 2014, Wurst accepted an invitation by Ulrike Lunacek MEP, vice-president of the Austrian Greens, to perform in a special concert at the European Parliament. The concert was organised by MEPs from 5 different parliamentary groups, with the aim to support the adoption of a report against homophobia and sexual discrimination in February. This was followed in November 2014 by a performance at the United Nations Office at Vienna and a meeting with the Secretary-General of the United Nations Ban Ki-moon. Ban hailed Wurst's win as a "powerful message", praising her promotion of respect for diversity, which he called a "core value" of the United Nations and that "discrimination has no place in the United Nations, nor in the world of the 21st century". Wurst had also extended her CV into voice acting, voicing the character of Eva in the German dub of the animated film Penguins of Madagascar, spin-off of the Madagascar film franchise.
