= Eurovision Song Contest 2014 =

International song competition

- #JoinUs

Dates and venue
- Semi-final 1: 6 May 2014
- Semi-final 2: 8 May 2014
- Final: 10 May 2014
- Venue: B&W Hallerne; Copenhagen, Denmark

Organisation
- Organiser: European Broadcasting Union (EBU)
- Executive supervisor: Jon Ola Sand

Production
- Host broadcaster: Danish Broadcasting Corporation (DR)
- Director: Per Zachariassen
- Executive producer: Pernille Gaardbo
- Presenters: Lise Rønne; Nikolaj Koppel; Pilou Asbæk

Participants
- Number of entries: 37
- Number of finalists: 26
- Returning countries: Poland; Portugal
- Non-returning countries: Bulgaria; Croatia; Cyprus; Serbia
- Participation map: Finalist countries Countries eliminated in the semi-finals Countries that participated in the past but not in 2014

Vote
- Voting system: Each country awarded 12, 10, 8–1 points to their 10 favourite songs.
- Winning song: Austria; "Rise Like a Phoenix"

The Eurovision Song Contest 2014 was the 59th edition of the Eurovision Song Contest. It consisted of two semi-finals on 6 and 8 May and a final on 10 May 2014, held at B&W Hallerne in Copenhagen, Denmark, and presented by Lise Rønne, Nikolaj Koppel, and Pilou Asbæk. It was organised by the European Broadcasting Union (EBU) and host broadcaster the Danish Broadcasting Corporation (DR), which staged the event after winning the 2013 contest for Denmark with the song "Only Teardrops" by Emmelie de Forest.

Broadcasters from thirty-seven countries participated in the contest; this included the return of Poland and Portugal after absences of two years and one year respectively. Overall, there were two fewer countries competing compared to the previous year, making thirty-seven participants, the smallest number since 2006. Bulgaria, Croatia, Cyprus, and Serbia opted not to participate.

The winner was Austria with the song "Rise Like a Phoenix", performed by Conchita Wurst and written by Charley Mason, Joey Patulka, Ali Zuckowski, and Julian Maas. The entry won both the jury vote and televote. Austria's first victory was 48 years earlier in 1966, which at the time was the longest gap between wins. The Netherlands, Sweden, Armenia, and Hungary rounded out the top five, with the Netherlands achieving their best result since its victory in 1975, Hungary achieving its best result since its fourth place in 1994, and Armenia equalling its best result from 2008. Of the "Big Five" countries, only Spain achieved a place in the top ten, while France finished in last place for the first time in its Eurovision history. Meanwhile, San Marino and Montenegro both qualified for the final for the first time.

A new record of 195 million viewers for the contest was reported. The host broadcaster DR and the EBU won the International TV Award at the Ondas Awards for their production of the event. The Danish organisers spent in total DKK 334 million, three times more than the initially budgeted costs, and were furthermore accused of nepotism.

== Location ==
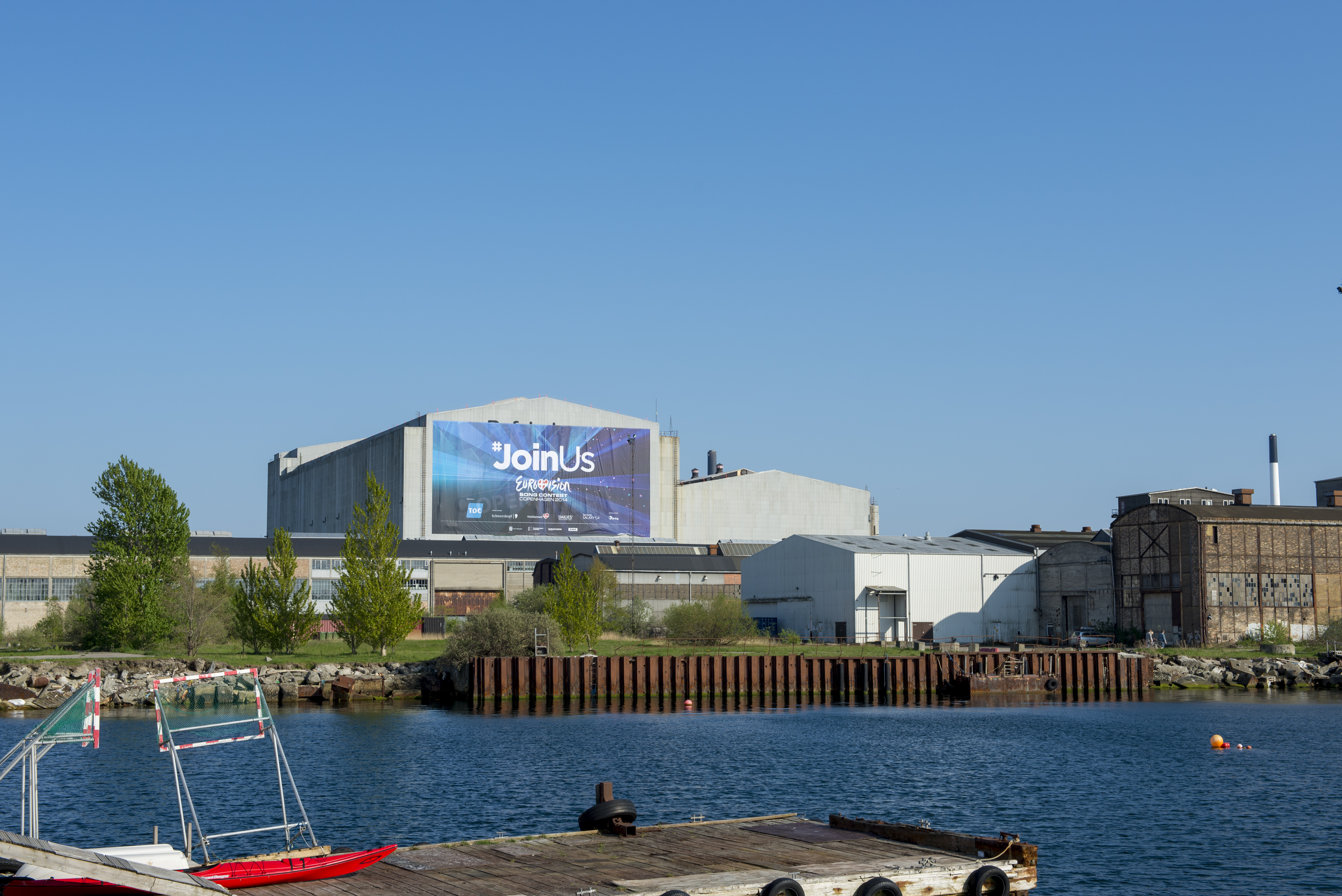
B&W Hallerne, Copenhagen – host venue of the 2014 contest.

The contest was held at the former shipyard Refshaleøen, in the B&W Hallerne in Copenhagen, with the social networking hashtag "#JoinUs" as the motto. The location had been refurbished to accommodate the event, with the surrounding area transformed into "Eurovision Island"—an Olympic Park-inspired complex housing the event venue, press centre, and other amenities.

The mayor of Copenhagen, Frank Jensen, declared in late August that the city would contribute to the budget with 40 million (Danish Kroner) (€5.36 million). He also announced that the aim was to make the Eurovision 2014 into the greenest contest to date since Copenhagen had been elected European Green Capital for 2014.

=== Bidding phase ===
Five cities had been considered as host city of the contest, including Herning and Copenhagen, both favourites to be the next host. The Parken Stadium, located in Copenhagen, which hosted the 2001 contest and Jyske Bank Boxen in Herning, which hosted the Dansk Melodi Grand Prix 2013 final, were the first venues to join the bidding phase. Later, Fredericia and Aalborg entered the phase with the Messe C and Gigantium venues, respectively. The fifth city to join the phase was Horsens, with the venue being the courtyard of the former Horsens State Prison. In the event that Horsens had been chosen to host the contest, the courtyard would have been covered by a permanent glass roof. The contest was provisionally set to take place on 13, 15 and 17 May 2014, however, the dates were later brought forward a week in order to accommodate the candidate cities.

On 17 June 2013, the municipality executive of Aalborg decided not to bid for hosting the contest due to the city's lack of sufficient hotel capacity. While DR required the host city to have at least 3,000 hotel rooms, the city of Aalborg had only 1,600 hotel rooms, more than half of which had been booked for other events taking place at the same time as the Eurovision Song Contest. On 18 June 2013, DR announced that formal bids on hosting the contest had been received by the municipalities of Copenhagen, Herning and Horsens, and that the Municipality of Fredericia had confirmed its intention to place a formal bid, too.

On 19 June 2013, the deadline for placing bids on hosting the contest, it was reported that Wonderful Copenhagen, the official convention, event and visitors bureau of the Greater Copenhagen area, had proposed three venues in its bid on hosting the contest: The Parken Stadium, a large tent on the grounds of DR Byen and the B&W Hallerne. On 25 June 2013, the Municipality of Fredericia announced that the Triangle Region had withdrawn its bid on hosting the contest, due to the lack of a suitable venue. DR required the hosting venue to have no pillars blocking any views and an interior height of at least 16 metres (52 ft). However, no venues in the region met those requirements and, therefore, Fredericia was no longer in the running for becoming host city of the 2014 Eurovision Song Contest. On 28 June 2013, Anders Hørsholt, CEO of Parken Sport & Entertainment, stated that the Parken Stadium was no longer in the running for hosting the contest due to several football matches having already been scheduled to take place at the stadium in the weeks leading up to the contest.

On 2 September 2013, the Danish broadcaster DR announced that it had chosen Copenhagen as the host city for the 2014 contest, with B&W Hallerne chosen as the host venue.

Locations of the candidate cities: the chosen host city is marked in blue, while the eliminated cities are marked in red.

Key † Host venue

City	Venue	Notes
Aalborg	Gigantium	Hosted Dansk Melodi Grand Prix in 2006, 2010 and 2012. Withdrew on 17 June 2013.
Copenhagen	A large tent on the grounds of DR Byen	—
Copenhagen	B&W Hallerne †	—
Copenhagen	Parken Stadium	Hosted the Eurovision Song Contest 2001. Withdrew on 28 June 2013.
Fredericia	Messe C	Withdrew on 26 June 2013.
Herning	Jyske Bank Boxen	Hosted the final of Dansk Melodi Grand Prix 2013
Horsens	Fængslet	—

=== Other sites ===
Location of host venue (red) and other contest-related sites and events (blue)

The Eurovision Village was the official Eurovision Song Contest fan and sponsors' area during the events week. There it was possible to watch performances by local artists, as well as the live shows broadcast from the main venue. Located at the Nytorv Square, it was open from 4 to 11 May 2014.

The EuroClub was the venue for the official after-parties and private performances by contest participants. Unlike the Eurovision Village, access to the EuroClub was restricted to accredited fans, delegates, and press. It was located at VEGA CPH Music Club.

The "Red Carpet" event, where the contestants and their delegations are presented before the accredited press and fans, took place at Copenhagen City Hall on 4 May 2014 at 17:00 CET, followed by the Opening Ceremony.

== Participants ==
Eurovision Song Contest 2014 – Participation summaries by country
- Albania; Armenia; Austria; Azerbaijan; Belarus; Belgium; Denmark; Estonia; Finland; France; Georgia; Germany; Greece; Hungary; Iceland; Ireland; Israel; Italy; Latvia; Lithuania; Macedonia; Malta; Moldova; Montenegro; Netherlands; Norway; Poland; Portugal; Romania; Russia; San Marino; Slovenia; Spain; Sweden; Switzerland; Ukraine; United Kingdom

Eligibility for potential participation in the Eurovision Song Contest requires a national broadcaster with active EBU membership capable of receiving the contest via the Eurovision network and broadcasting it live nationwide. The EBU issued an invitation to participate in the contest to all active members.

Thirty-seven countries participated in the 2014 contest. Poland and Portugal both returned to the contest, having last participated in 2011 and 2012 respectively. However, Bulgarian broadcaster Bulgarian National Television (BNT), Croatian broadcaster Hrvatska radiotelevizija (HRT), Cypriot broadcaster Cyprus Broadcasting Corporation (CyBC) and Serbian broadcaster Radio Television of Serbia (RTS) did not participate in the 2014 contest.

Valentina Monetta who had represented San Marino in 2012 and 2013, returned to the contest for the third year in a row. This makes Monetta the fourth main singer to compete in three consecutive contests (and the only one of amongst them never to win in one of these occasions), following Lys Assia, who represented Switzerland in 1956, 1957, and 1958, Corry Brokken, who represented the Netherlands in 1956, 1957, and 1958, and Udo Jürgens, who represented Austria in 1964, 1965, and 1966. Monetta would return again in 2017. Paula Seling and Ovi had represented Romania in 2010. The Tolmachevy Sisters, representing Russia, had won Junior Eurovision for Russia in 2006.

In addition, Tamara Todevska, providing backing vocals for Macedonia, had represented Macedonia in 2008. She would later represent North Macedonia in 2019. Martina Majerle, providing backing vocals for Montenegro, had represented Slovenia in 2009 and provided backing vocals for Croatia in 2003, Montenegro in 2008, and Slovenia in 2007, 2011, and 2012.

Eurovision Song Contest 2014 participants
Country	Broadcaster	Artist	Song	Language	Songwriter(s)
Albania	RTSH	Hersi	"One Night's Anger"	English	Gentian Lako; Jorgo Papingji
Armenia	AMPTV	Aram Mp3	"Not Alone"	English	Aram Mp3; Garik Papoyan
Austria	ORF	Conchita Wurst	"Rise Like a Phoenix"	English	Julian Maas; Charlie Mason; Joey Patulka; Ali Zuckowski
Azerbaijan	İTV	Dilara Kazimova	"Start a Fire"	English	Alessandra Günthardt; Johan Kronlund; Stefan Örn
Belarus	BTRC	Teo	"Cheesecake"	English	Dmitry Novik; Yury Vashchuk
Belgium	VRT	Axel Hirsoux	"Mother"	English	Rafael Artesero; Ashley Hicklin
Denmark	DR	Basim	"Cliche Love Song"	English	Daniel Fält; Lasse Lindorff; Basim Moujahid; Kim Novak-Zorde
Estonia	ERR	Tanja	"Amazing"	English	Tanja; Timo Vendt
Finland	Yle	Softengine	"Something Better"	English	Topi Latukka; Henri Oskár
France	France Télévisions	Twin Twin	"Moustache"	French	François Ardouvin; Lorent Ardouvin; Pierre Beyres; Kim N'Guyen
Georgia	GPB	The Shin and Mariko	"Three Minutes to Earth"	English	Eugen Eliu; Zaza Miminoshvili
Germany	NDR (Note: On behalf of the German public broadcasting consortium ARD)	Elaiza	"Is It Right"	English	Adam Kesselhaut; Frank Kretschmer; Elżbieta Steinmetz
Greece	NERIT	Freaky Fortune feat. RiskyKidd	"Rise Up"	English	Freaky Fortune; RiskyKidd
Hungary	MTVA	András Kállay-Saunders	"Running"	English	András Kállay-Saunders; Krisztián Szakos
Iceland	RÚV	Pollapönk	"No Prejudice"	English	John Grant; Haraldur Freyr Gíslason; Heiðar Örn Kristjánsson
Ireland	RTÉ	Can-linn feat. Kasey Smith	"Heartbeat"	English	Jonas Gladnikoff; Patrizia Helander; Hazel Kaneswaran; Rasmus Palmgren
Israel	IBA	Mei Finegold	"Same Heart"	English, Hebrew	Rami Talmid
Italy	RAI	Emma	"La mia città"	Italian	Emma Marrone
Latvia	LTV	Aarzemnieki	"Cake to Bake"	English	Guntis Veilands
Lithuania	LRT	Vilija	"Attention"	English	Vilija Matačiūnaitė; Viktoras Vaupšas
Macedonia	MRT	Tijana	"To the Sky"	English	Lazar Cvetkoski; Darko Dimitrov; Elena Risteska Ivanovska
Malta	PBS	Firelight	"Coming Home"	English	Richard Edwards Micallef
Moldova	TRM	Cristina Scarlat	"Wild Soul"	English	Ivan Akulov; Lidia Scarlat
Montenegro	RTCG	Sergej Ćetković	"Moj svijet" (Мој свијет)	Montenegrin	Sergej Ćetković; Emina Sandal
Netherlands	AVROTROS	The Common Linnets	"Calm After the Storm"	English	Matthew Crosby; Rob Crosby; Ilse DeLange; Jake Etheridge; JB Meijers
Norway	NRK	Carl Espen	"Silent Storm"	English	Josefin Winther
Poland	TVP	Donatan and Cleo	"My Słowianie – We Are Slavic"	Polish, English	Cleo; Donatan
Portugal	RTP	Suzy	"Quero ser tua"	Portuguese	Emanuel
Romania	TVR	Paula Seling and Ovi	"Miracle"	English	Frida Amundsen; Beyond51; Philip Halloun; Ovi
Russia	RTR	Tolmachevy Sisters	"Shine"	English	John Ballard; Gerard James Borg; Ralph Charlie; Philipp Kirkorov; Dimitris Kontopoulos
San Marino	SMRTV	Valentina Monetta	"Maybe"	English	Mauro Balestri; Ralph Siegel
Slovenia	RTVSLO	Tinkara Kovač	"Round and Round"	English, Slovene	Tinkara Kovač; Hannah Mancini; Tina Piš; Raay
Spain	RTVE	Ruth Lorenzo	"Dancing in the Rain"	English, Spanish	Julian Emery; James Lawrence Irvin; Ruth Lorenzo
Sweden	SVT	Sanna Nielsen	"Undo"	English	Fredrik Kempe; David Kreuger; Hamed "K-One" Pirouzpanah
Switzerland	SRG SSR	Sebalter	"Hunter of Stars"	English	Sebastiano Paù-Lessi
Ukraine	NTU	Mariya Yaremchuk	"Tick-Tock"	English	Sandra Bjurman; Mariya Yaremchuk
United Kingdom	BBC	Molly	"Children of the Universe"	English	Anders Hansson; Molly Smitten-Downes

=== Other countries ===
==== Active EBU members ====
Bosnian broadcaster BHRT initially stated their intention to participate in the contest; however, in late 2013 it was announced that they would not be taking part due to a lack of sponsorship. Similarly, Bulgarian broadcaster BNT initially planned to participate but later announced otherwise due to limited funds.

Active EBU member broadcasters in Andorra, Croatia, Cyprus, the Czech Republic, Luxembourg, Monaco, Morocco, Serbia, Slovakia and Turkey confirmed non-participation prior to the announcement of the participants list by the EBU, some of them citing reasons such as poor results in previous editions, dissatisfaction with the mixed jury/televote voting system, the European financial crisis and the 2012–13 Cypriot financial crisis.

==== Non-EBU members ====
While Kosovan broadcaster RTK did not voice any intention regarding the 2014 contest, Kosovo's Deputy Minister of Foreign Affairs Petrit Selimi told the Swedish television programme Korrespondenterna that he thought Kosovo would be granted EBU membership and acceptance into the Eurovision in time for the 2014 edition; however, the country failed to meet the requirement of being recognized as an independent country by the International Telecommunication Union, and was not granted membership in the EBU. Liechtensteiner broadcaster 1FLTV had originally intended to join the EBU in time to participate in the 2013 contest, but the government never granted the required financial subsidies and the broadcaster put off the aim to make their debut to 2014; however, the government again failed to provide any funds and 1FLTV was unable to join the contest.

== Format ==
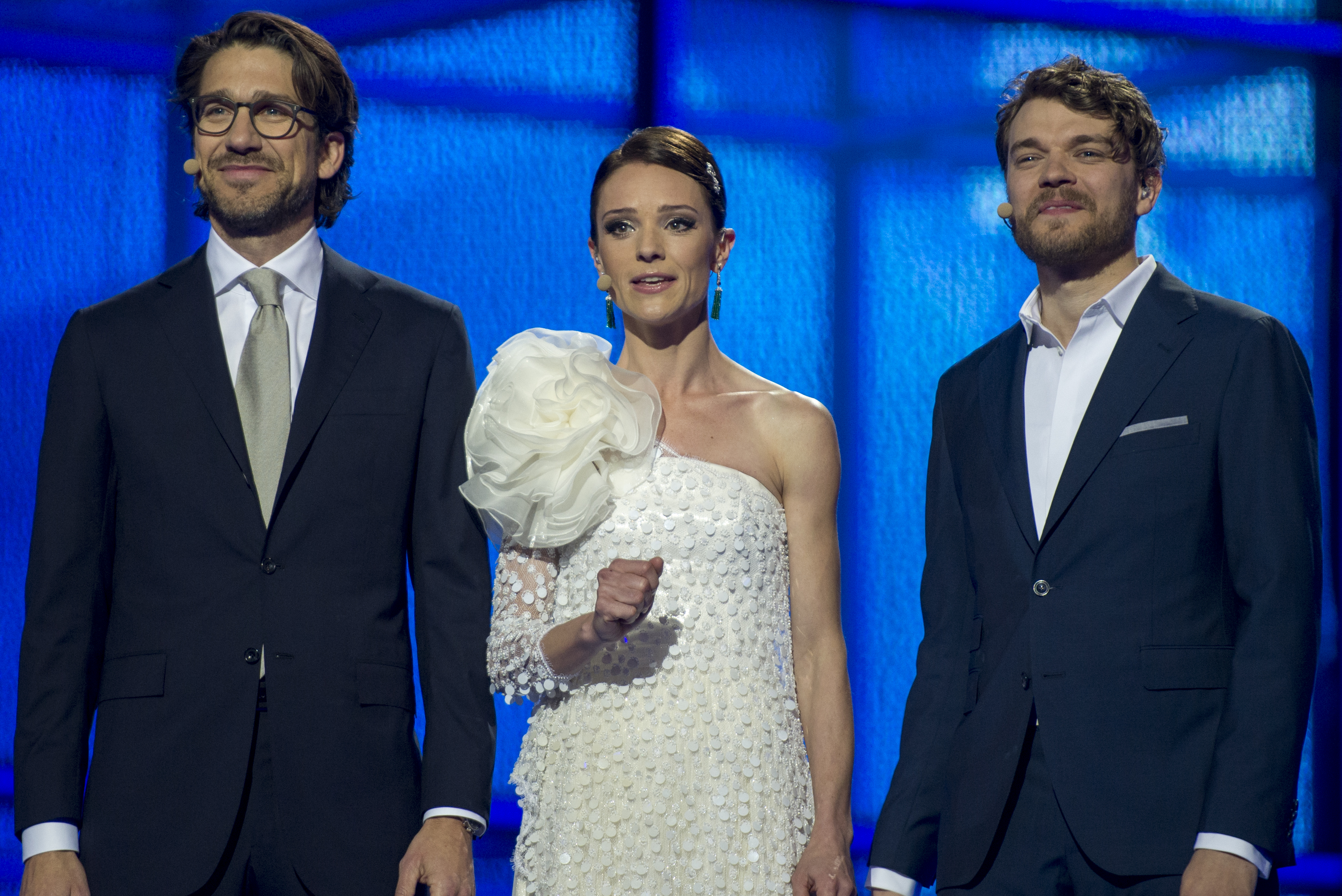
Presenters from left to right: Nikolaj Koppel, Lise Rønne and Pilou Asbæk.

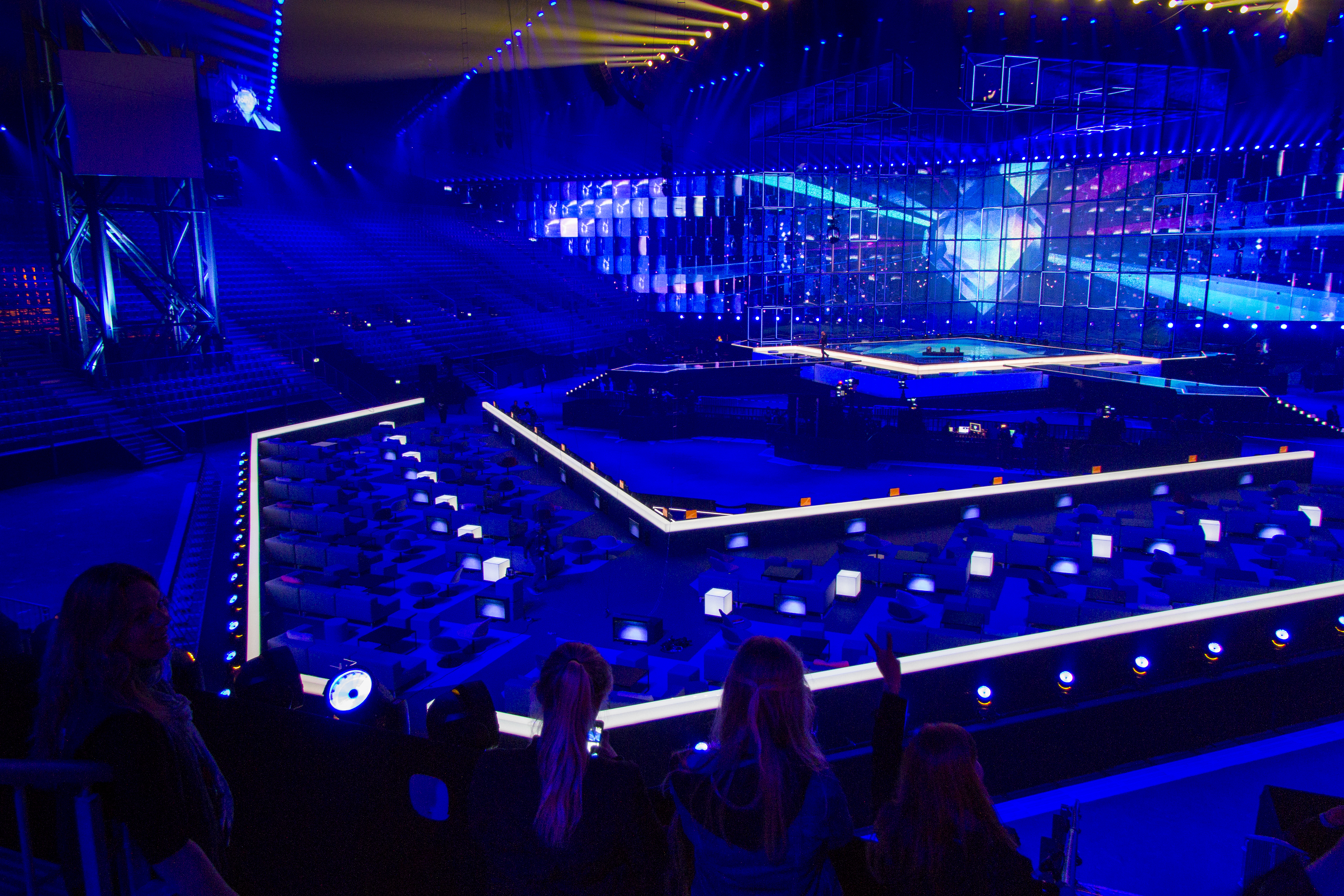
Stage design of the contest

The competition consisted of two semi-finals and a final, a format which has been in use since 2008. The ten countries with the highest scores in each semi-final qualified to the final where they joined the host nation Denmark and the five main sponsoring nations (known as the Big Five): France, Germany, Italy, Spain and the United Kingdom.

Each participating country had their own national jury, which consisted of five professional members of the music industry. Each member of a respective nation's jury was required to rank every song, except that of their own country. The voting results from each member of a particular nation's jury were combined to produce an overall ranking from first to last place. Likewise, the televoting results were also interpreted as a full ranking, taking into account the full televoting result rather than just the top ten. The combination of the jury's full ranking and the televote's full ranking produced an overall ranking of all competing entries. The song which scored the highest overall rank received 12 points, while the tenth-best ranked song received 1-point. In the event of a televoting (insufficient number of votes/technical issues) or jury failure (technical issue/breach of rules), only a jury/televoting was used by each country.

On 20 September 2013, the EBU released the official rules for the 2014 contest, which introduced rule changes regarding the jury voting. The rules aimed at providing more transparency regarding each five member national jury by releasing the names of all jurors on 1 May 2014 prior to the start of the contest and providing each juror's full ranking results after the conclusion of the contest. In addition, jury members on a particular nation's jury can only serve as a juror if they have not already participated as such in one of the preceding two contest editions.

The contest was held in the immediate aftermath of the 2014 Ukrainian revolution and subsequent annexation of Crimea by Russia. Votes cast through Ukrainian telecom providers which service Crimea were counted towards Ukraine's votes.

=== Semi-final allocation draw ===
Results of the semi-final allocation draw Participating countries in the first semi-final Pre-qualified for the final but also voting in the first semi-final Participating countries in the second semi-final Pre-qualified for the final but also voting in the second semi-final

The draw that determined the semi-final allocation was held on 20 January 2014 at the Copenhagen City Hall. Prior to the allocation draw, on 24 November 2013 it was announced that Norway and Sweden would perform in different semi-finals in order to maximise the availability of tickets for visitors from both countries. A draw at the EBU headquarters determined that Sweden would perform in the first semi-final, while Norway would perform in the second semi-final. The EBU also allocated Israel to the second semi-final after a request from the delegation in order to avoid complications with its Independence Day coinciding with the date of the first semi-final. The remaining participating countries, excluding the automatic finalists (Denmark, France, Germany, Italy, Spain and the United Kingdom), were split into six pots, based on voting patterns from the previous ten years.

The pots were calculated by the televoting partner Digame and were as follows:

Pot 1	Pot 2	Pot 3	Pot 4	Pot 5	Pot 6
Albania; Macedonia; Montenegro; Slovenia; Switzerland	Estonia; Finland; Iceland; Latvia; Lithuania	Azerbaijan; Belarus; Georgia; Russia; Ukraine	Armenia; Belgium; Greece; Ireland; Netherlands	Austria; Hungary; Poland; San Marino	Malta; Moldova; Portugal; Romania

=== Running order ===
As in 2013, the host broadcaster DR and their producers determined the running order for each show with only the starting position of the host nation being determined by draw. A draw which took place during the heads of delegation meeting on 17 March 2014 in Copenhagen determined that Denmark would perform 23rd in the final. On 24 March 2014, the running order for the two semi-finals was released. Prior to the creation of the running order for the final, an allocation draw was held during the semi-final winners press conferences following the conclusion of each semi-final and during the individual press conferences on 6 May 2014 for the Big Five (France, Germany, Italy, Spain and the United Kingdom). The draw determined whether the country would perform in the first or second half of the final. The producers published the final running order shortly before 02:00 (CEST) on 9 May 2014. Ukraine were chosen to perform first, whilst the United Kingdom were chosen to perform last.

=== Graphic design ===
The graphic design of the contest was revealed by the EBU on 18 December 2013. The theme art comprises a blue and purple diamond, within it the generic Eurovision Song Contest logo featuring the Danish flag as well as the hashtag and slogan "#JoinUs" at the centre of the diamond.

The postcards used to introduce a country and their participants were shot in their respective countries and featured the artists using unique ways to create their country's flag, e.g. the postcard for the United Kingdom features Molly creating the Union Flag from AEC Routemaster buses, Royal Mail vans, and people wearing blue raincoats along with strips of red and white paper, and the postcard for Denmark features Basim and his singers using old furniture and red and white paint to paint the Danish flag. The postcards then ended with the act taking a picture on a camera or phone and a close up of the resulting artwork was shown onscreen. The flag created by the artist(s) is then captured into a diamond and transitions to the official flag.

=== National host broadcaster ===
Pernille Gaardbo was appointed by DR's Director-General Maria Rørbye Rønn as the executive producer for the contest, three-days after Denmark's victory at the 2013 contest. Maria Rørbye Rønn stated in an interview that "By choosing Pernille Gaardbo, we have a person who has all the necessary leadership skills, which are essential in order to run a project of this magnitude, and the technical insight for such a large TV-production, which the Eurovision Song Contest is". Gaardbo has worked for the host broadcaster for 17 years, 12 of which was in the role of supervisor of the DR Medieservice.

Danish royal family members Crown Prince Frederik and Crown Princess Mary attended the final as invited guests. In March 2014, host broadcaster DR invited Jessica Mauboy to perform during the interval act of the second semi-final on 8 May 2014, part of DR's recognition of Australia's dedication to the contest. Mauboy performed the song "Sea of Flags" during the interval act.

== Contest overview ==
=== Semi-final 1 ===
The first semi-final took place on 6 May 2014 at 21:00 CEST. All the countries competing in this semi-final were eligible to vote, plus Spain, France, and Denmark. The highlighted countries qualified for the final.

Qualifiers

Results of the first semi-final of the Eurovision Song Contest 2014
R/O	Country	Artist	Song	Points	Place
1	Armenia	Aram Mp3	"Not Alone"	121	4
2	Latvia	Aarzemnieki	"Cake to Bake"	33	13
3	Estonia	Tanja	"Amazing"	36	12
4	Sweden	Sanna Nielsen	"Undo"	131	2
5	Iceland	Pollapönk	"No Prejudice"	61	8
6	Albania	Hersi	"One Night's Anger"	22	15
7	Russia	Tolmachevy Sisters	"Shine"	63	6
8	Azerbaijan	Dilara Kazimova	"Start a Fire"	57	9
9	Ukraine	Mariya Yaremchuk	"Tick-Tock"	118	5
10	Belgium	Axel Hirsoux	"Mother"	28	14
11	Moldova	Cristina Scarlat	"Wild Soul"	13	16
12	San Marino	Valentina Monetta	"Maybe"	40	10
13	Portugal	Suzy	"Quero ser tua"	39	11
14	Netherlands	The Common Linnets	"Calm After the Storm"	150	1
15	Montenegro	Sergej Ćetković	"Moj svijet"	63	7
16	Hungary	András Kállay-Saunders	"Running"	127	3

=== Semi-final 2 ===
The second semi-final took place on 8 May 2014 at 21:00 CEST. All the countries competing in this semi-final were eligible to vote, plus Germany, Italy, and the United Kingdom. The highlighted countries qualified for the final.

Results of the second semi-final of the Eurovision Song Contest 2014
R/O	Country	Artist	Song	Points	Place
1	Malta	Firelight	"Coming Home"	63	9
2	Israel	Mei Finegold	"Same Heart"	19	14
3	Norway	Carl Espen	"Silent Storm"	77	6
4	Georgia	The Shin and Mariko	"Three Minutes to Earth"	15	15
5	Poland	Donatan and Cleo	"My Słowianie – We Are Slavic"	70	8
6	Austria	Conchita Wurst	"Rise Like a Phoenix"	169	1
7	Lithuania	Vilija	"Attention"	36	11
8	Finland	Softengine	"Something Better"	97	3
9	Ireland	Can-linn feat. Kasey Smith	"Heartbeat"	35	12
10	Belarus	Teo	"Cheesecake"	87	5
11	Macedonia	Tijana	"To the Sky"	33	13
12	Switzerland	Sebalter	"Hunter of Stars"	92	4
13	Greece	Freaky Fortune feat. RiskyKidd	"Rise Up"	74	7
14	Slovenia	Tinkara Kovač	"Round and Round"	52	10
15	Romania	Paula Seling and Ovi	"Miracle"	125	2

=== Final ===
The final took place on 10 May 2014 at 21:00 CEST and was won by Austria. The "Big Five" and the host country, Denmark, qualified directly for the final. From the two semi-finals on 6 and 8 May 2014, twenty countries qualified for the final. A total of 26 countries competed in the final and all 37 participants voted.

As in the 2013 contest, the winner was announced as soon as it was mathematically impossible to catch up. In this case, the winner had been determined by the 34th vote out of the 37, which came from Ukraine.

Austria won with 290 points, winning both the jury vote and the televote. Netherlands came second with 238 points, with Sweden, Armenia, Hungary, Ukraine, Russia, Norway, Denmark and Spain completing the top ten. Azerbaijan, Malta, San Marino, Slovenia and France occupied the bottom five positions.

Winner

Results of the final of the Eurovision Song Contest 2014
R/O	Country	Artist	Song	Points	Place
1	Ukraine	Mariya Yaremchuk	"Tick-Tock"	113	6
2	Belarus	Teo	"Cheesecake"	43	16
3	Azerbaijan	Dilara Kazimova	"Start a Fire"	33	22
4	Iceland	Pollapönk	"No Prejudice"	58	15
5	Norway	Carl Espen	"Silent Storm"	88	8
6	Romania	Paula Seling and Ovi	"Miracle"	72	12
7	Armenia	Aram Mp3	"Not Alone"	174	4
8	Montenegro	Sergej Ćetković	"Moj svijet"	37	19
9	Poland	Donatan and Cleo	"My Słowianie – We Are Slavic"	62	14
10	Greece	Freaky Fortune feat. RiskyKidd	"Rise Up"	35	20
11	Austria	Conchita Wurst	"Rise Like a Phoenix"	290	1
12	Germany	Elaiza	"Is It Right"	39	18
13	Sweden	Sanna Nielsen	"Undo"	218	3
14	France	Twin Twin	"Moustache"	2	26
15	Russia	Tolmachevy Sisters	"Shine"	89	7
16	Italy	Emma	"La mia città"	33	21
17	Slovenia	Tinkara Kovač	"Round and Round"	9	25
18	Finland	Softengine	"Something Better"	72	11
19	Spain	Ruth Lorenzo	"Dancing in the Rain"	74	10
20	Switzerland	Sebalter	"Hunter of Stars"	64	13
21	Hungary	András Kállay-Saunders	"Running"	143	5
22	Malta	Firelight	"Coming Home"	32	23
23	Denmark	Basim	"Cliche Love Song"	74	9
24	Netherlands	The Common Linnets	"Calm After the Storm"	238	2
25	San Marino	Valentina Monetta	"Maybe"	14	24
26	United Kingdom	Molly	"Children of the Universe"	40	17

==== Spokespersons ====
Each participating broadcaster appointed a spokesperson who was responsible for announcing, in English or French, the votes for its respective country. The order in which each country announced their votes was determined in a draw following the jury results from the final dress rehearsal. An algorithm implemented by NRK, based on jury vote, was used to generate as much suspense as possible. The spokespersons are shown alongside each country.

1. Azerbaijan – Sabina Babayeva
2. Greece – Andrianna Maggania
3. Poland – Paulina Chylewska
4. Albania – Andri Xhahu
5. San Marino – Michele Perniola
6. Denmark – Sofie Lassen-Kahlke
7. Montenegro – Tijana Mišković
8. Romania – Sonia Argint-Ionescu
9. Russia – Alsou
10. Netherlands – Tim Douwsma
11. Malta – Valentina Rossi
12. France – Élodie Suigo
13. United Kingdom – Scott Mills
14. Latvia – Ralfs Eilands
15. Armenia – Anna Avanesyan
16. Iceland – Benedikt Valsson
17. Macedonia – Marko Mark
18. Sweden – Alcazar
19. Belarus – Alyona Lanskaya
20. Germany – Helene Fischer
21. Israel – Ofer Nachshon
22. Portugal – Joana Teles
23. Norway – Margrethe Røed
24. Estonia – Lauri Pihlap
25. Hungary – Éva Novodomszky
26. Moldova – Olivia Furtuna
27. Ireland – Nicky Byrne
28. Finland – Redrama
29. Lithuania – Ignas Krupavičius
30. Austria – Kati Bellowitsch
31. Spain – Carolina Casado
32. Belgium – Angelique Vlieghe
33. Italy – Linus
34. Ukraine – Zlata Ognevich
35. Switzerland – Kurt Aeschbacher
36. Georgia – Sophie Gelovani and Nodi Tatishvili
37. Slovenia – Ula Furlan

== Detailed voting results ==
Full results including televoting and results from the individual jury members were released shortly after the final.

=== Semi-final 1 ===
Albania, Montenegro, San Marino and Moldova used juries due to an inability to provide televoting results.

Qualifiers

Split results of semi-final 1
Place	Combined		Jury		Televoting	
Place	Country	Points	Country	Points	Country	Points
1	Netherlands	150	Netherlands	130	Netherlands	147
2	Sweden	131	Sweden	125	Hungary	125
3	Hungary	127	Hungary	122	Sweden	122
4	Armenia	121	Armenia	102	Armenia	121
5	Ukraine	118	Azerbaijan	94	Ukraine	119
6	Russia	63 (Note: Despite finishing with the same number of points as Montenegro, Russia is deemed to have finished in sixth place due to receiving points from a greater number of countries.)	Ukraine	88	Russia	73
7	Montenegro	63	Montenegro	74	Portugal	72
8	Iceland	61	Iceland	68	San Marino	58
9	Azerbaijan	57	Albania	64	Iceland	50
10	San Marino	40	Estonia	61	Montenegro	43
11	Portugal	39	Russia	57	Belgium	41
12	Estonia	36	Latvia	27	Azerbaijan	41
13	Latvia	33	San Marino	25	Latvia	40
14	Belgium	28	Belgium	24	Albania	23
15	Albania	22	Moldova	24	Moldova	14
16	Moldova	13	Portugal	17	Estonia	13

Detailed voting results of semi-final 1
Voting procedure used: 50% jury and televote 100% jury vote		Total score	Armenia	Latvia	Estonia	Sweden	Iceland	Albania	Russia	Azerbaijan	Ukraine	Belgium	Moldova	San Marino	Portugal	Netherlands	Montenegro	Hungary	Denmark	France	Spain
Contestants	Armenia	121		6	5	8	3	5	12		12	3		10	4	12	10	8	5	12	6
Contestants	Latvia	33			6	1	6			7		5		2	3			2	1		
Contestants	Estonia	36	5	10		5	5			5										4	2
Contestants	Sweden	131	4	8	7		10	6	6		10	8	10	3	8	8	5	10	10	6	12
Contestants	Iceland	61		5	2	7					3	4		7	1	7		6	8	8	3
Contestants	Albania	22										2		5		1	12		2		
Contestants	Russia	63	7	4	1	2	2			10	6	1	12		5		4	5	4		
Contestants	Azerbaijan	57		2	4		1	7	10		5		6	6	2	4	7	1		2	
Contestants	Ukraine	118	12	7	10	6	7	3	7	12		7	8	4	7	5	8	3	7		5
Contestants	Belgium	28	6						4	4			7	1		3	2			1	
Contestants	Moldova	13						4	1		2						6				
Contestants	San Marino	40	2	1	3		4	8	3	6	4		1					7			1
Contestants	Portugal	39	3			4		1		1		6	3			2	3		3	5	8
Contestants	Netherlands	150	10	12	12	12	12	2	2	3	7	10	2	12	12		1	12	12	10	7
Contestants	Montenegro	63	8			3		12	5	2	1		5		6	6		4		7	4
Contestants	Hungary	127	1	3	8	10	8	10	8	8	8	12	4	8	10	10			6	3	10

==== 12 points ====
Below is a summary of the maximum 12 points each country awarded to another in the first semifinal:

N.	Contestant	Nation(s) giving 12 points
8	Netherlands	Denmark, Estonia, Hungary, Iceland, Latvia, Portugal, San Marino, Sweden
4	Armenia	France, Netherlands, Russia, Ukraine
2	Ukraine	Armenia, Azerbaijan
1	Sweden	Spain
1	Albania	Montenegro
1	Russia	Moldova
1	Montenegro	Albania
1	Hungary	Belgium

=== Semi-final 2 ===
Qualifiers

Georgia and Macedonia used juries due to either technical issues with the televoting or an insufficient number of votes cast during the televote period.

Split results of semi-final 2
Place	Combined		Jury		Televoting	
Place	Country	Points	Country	Points	Country	Points
1	Austria	169	Austria	138	Austria	165
2	Romania	125	Finland	117	Romania	126
3	Finland	97	Malta	113	Poland	116
4	Switzerland	92	Norway	100	Switzerland	98
5	Belarus	87	Romania	99	Greece	91
6	Norway	77	Belarus	71	Belarus	86
7	Greece	74	Macedonia	70	Finland	63
8	Poland	70	Slovenia	60	Norway	55
9	Malta	63	Greece	52	Slovenia	48
10	Slovenia	52	Switzerland	51	Ireland	47
11	Lithuania	36	Lithuania	41	Lithuania	44
12	Ireland	35	Poland	34	Malta	36
13	Macedonia	33	Georgia	33	Macedonia	28
14	Israel	19	Ireland	33	Israel	26
15	Georgia	15	Israel	32	Georgia	15

Detailed voting results of semi-final 2
Voting procedure used: 50% jury and televote 100% jury vote		Total score	Malta	Israel	Norway	Georgia	Poland	Austria	Lithuania	Finland	Ireland	Belarus	Macedonia	Switzerland	Greece	Slovenia	Romania	Germany	Italy	United Kingdom
Contestants	Malta	63			2	8	4	1	1	5	3	4	12	5			3	3	5	7
Contestants	Israel	19								3		2	5		6		1	2		
Contestants	Norway	77	7			5	6	5	8	10	8		4	2	7	4	4	7		
Contestants	Georgia	15	2						6			5			1			1		
Contestants	Poland	70	1	4	7			2	4		2	10	3	3	3	5		12	10	4
Contestants	Austria	169	10	10	8	10	10		10	12	12	7	6	12	12	10	12	4	12	12
Contestants	Lithuania	36			5	7	2				5	6							1	10
Contestants	Finland	97		3	12	1	8	8	5		10		10	8	4	2	5	5	8	8
Contestants	Ireland	35	4	1	3		5	4					7	1	2	1	2			5
Contestants	Belarus	87	6	7	1	12	7	10	12	7	1		2		8	6	8			
Contestants	Macedonia	33	3	2		2				1		1		10		12			2	
Contestants	Switzerland	92	5	5			12	6	7	8	6	3	1		5	8	10	10	3	3
Contestants	Greece	74	8	6	6	3	1	3		4	4	12		4		3	7	6	6	1
Contestants	Slovenia	52		8	4	4	3	7	3	2				6			6		7	2
Contestants	Romania	125	12	12	10	6		12	2	6	7	8	8	7	10	7		8	4	6

==== 12 points ====
Below is a summary of the maximum 12 points each country awarded to another in the second semifinal:

N.	Contestant	Nation(s) giving 12 points
7	Austria	Finland, Greece, Ireland, Italy, Romania, Switzerland, United Kingdom
3	Romania	Austria, Israel, Malta
2	Belarus	Georgia, Lithuania
1	Malta	Macedonia
1	Poland	Germany
1	Finland	Norway
1	Macedonia	Slovenia
1	Switzerland	Poland
1	Greece	Belarus

=== Final ===
Winner

Split results of the final
Place	Combined		Jury		Televoting	
Place	Country	Points	Country	Points	Country	Points
1	Austria	290	Austria	224	Austria	311
2	Netherlands	238	Sweden	201	Netherlands	222
3	Sweden	218	Netherlands	200	Armenia	193
4	Armenia	174	Hungary	138	Sweden	190
5	Hungary	143	Armenia	125	Poland	162
6	Ukraine	113	Malta	119	Russia	132
7	Russia	89	Finland	114	Switzerland	114
8	Norway	88	Azerbaijan	108	Ukraine	112
9	Denmark	74 (Note: Despite finishing with the same number of points as Spain, Denmark is deemed to have finished in ninth place due to receiving points from a greater number of countries.)	Norway	102	Romania	103
10	Spain	74	Denmark	85	Hungary	98
11	Finland	72 (Note: Despite finishing with the same number of points as Romania, Finland is deemed to have finished in eleventh place due to receiving points from a greater number of countries.)	Spain	83	Belarus	56
12	Romania	72	Ukraine	78	Iceland	46
13	Switzerland	64	Russia	70	Denmark	43 (Note: Despite finishing with the same number of points in the televote as Greece, Denmark is deemed to have finished higher due to receiving points from a greater number of countries in the televote.)
14	Poland	62	Germany	61	Greece	43
15	Iceland	58	Iceland	59	Spain	41
16	Belarus	43	United Kingdom	52	Norway	39
17	United Kingdom	40	Romania	51	Finland	39
18	Germany	39	Belarus	50	Montenegro	33
19	Montenegro	37	Greece	49	Italy	32
20	Greece	35	Montenegro	48	Germany	31
21	Italy	33 (Note: Despite finishing with the same number of points as Azerbaijan, Italy is deemed to have finished in twenty-first place due to receiving points from a greater number of countries.)	Italy	37	United Kingdom	29
22	Azerbaijan	33	Switzerland	27	Azerbaijan	26
23	Malta	32	Poland	23	San Marino	18
24	San Marino	14	Slovenia	21	Malta	17
25	Slovenia	9	San Marino	16	Slovenia	15
26	France	2	France	5	France	1

Detailed voting results of the final
Voting procedure used: 50% jury and televote 100% televoting 100% jury vote		Total score	Azerbaijan	Greece	Poland	Albania	San Marino	Denmark	Montenegro	Romania	Russia	Netherlands	Malta	France	United Kingdom	Latvia	Armenia	Iceland	Macedonia	Sweden	Belarus	Germany	Israel	Portugal	Norway	Estonia	Hungary	Moldova	Ireland	Finland	Lithuania	Austria	Spain	Belgium	Italy	Ukraine	Switzerland	Georgia	Slovenia
Contestants	Ukraine	113	10	5	5			1	7		7					7					8		5			8	2	10		2	5	5	6	4	10			6	
Contestants	Belarus	43	7						1		12						8						1					5			3					6			
Contestants	Azerbaijan	33					12				10										3															1		7	
Contestants	Iceland	58					8	5			1	6		7	4					4		2			6		5					2	1		7				
Contestants	Norway	88		3	7			6		1		10	2	2		5		1		3	4	5		3		3			7	7	8	1					5		5
Contestants	Romania	72	6										8						4		1		8	1	4			12	2			8	8	5	5				
Contestants	Armenia	174		7	1		6	2	10	7	8	7	6	12		10		2	8	5	10	6	6	4		5	7	3		4		12	4			10		12	
Contestants	Montenegro	37				6											12		12																				7
Contestants	Poland	62	2	1					4					5				3	5	2	7	10			2		3	2							8	7			1
Contestants	Greece	35	4			2					4		1		2		7				6		2												3			4	
Contestants	Austria	290	1	12		5		8	2	8	5	12	10	10	12	6		10	3	12		7	12	12	10	4	10	7	12	12	10		12	12	12	8	12	10	12
Contestants	Germany	39			8	4				2							6																			5	7	5	2
Contestants	Sweden	218		2	4	7	10	12	3	12	2	8	7	4	7	8		7					10	8	8	10	8	6	4	10	7	6	10	10		12	6	2	8
Contestants	France	2																		1										1									
Contestants	Russia	89	12	10									5			2	10		6		12		3	2		1		8			6					4		8	
Contestants	Italy	33				10			6				12	1					2																		2		
Contestants	Slovenia	9							8										1																				
Contestants	Finland	72			3		3	4				2			6	3		5		6		4			7	6	6					4		3	6		4		
Contestants	Spain	74			2	12				5				6	5	4	2					1	4		5	2			6		4			2		2	8		4
Contestants	Switzerland	64		4	10				5	6		3	3		1		5					3		7			1		5		2	3			2			1	3
Contestants	Hungary	143	8	6		8	7	3	12	10	6	4				1		6	10	7	5		7	6		7		4	1	5		7	2	7		3	1		
Contestants	Malta	32	5			1	4					5			10														3	3					1				
Contestants	Denmark	74			6		1			4		1		3	3		1	8		8		8		5	1					6	1		3	6			3		6
Contestants	Netherlands	238		8	12		2	10		3	3			8	8	12	4	12	7	10	2	12		10	12	12	12		10	8	12	10	7	8	4		10		10
Contestants	San Marino	14	3			3											3										4	1											
Contestants	United Kingdom	40					5	7					4					4							3				8				5	1				3	

==== 12 points ====
Below is a summary of the maximum 12 points each country awarded to another in the Grand Final:

N.	Contestant	Nation(s) giving 12 points
13	Austria	Belgium, Finland, Greece, Ireland, Israel, Italy, Netherlands, Portugal, Slovenia, Spain, Sweden, Switzerland, United Kingdom
8	Netherlands	Estonia, Germany, Hungary, Iceland, Latvia, Lithuania, Norway, Poland
3	Armenia	Austria, France, Georgia
3	Sweden	Denmark, Romania, Ukraine
2	Montenegro	Armenia, Macedonia
2	Russia	Azerbaijan, Belarus
1	Italy	Malta
1	Azerbaijan	San Marino
1	Belarus	Russia
1	Romania	Moldova
1	Spain	Albania
1	Hungary	Montenegro

== Broadcasts ==
Most countries sent commentators to Copenhagen or commentated from their own country, in order to add insight to the participants and, if necessary, the provision of voting information.

It was reported by the EBU that the 2014 contest was viewed by a worldwide television audience of a record breaking 195 million viewers.

Broadcasters and commentators in participating countries
Country	Broadcaster	Channel(s)	Show(s)	Commentator(s)	Ref(s)
Albania	RTSH	TVSH, RTSH Muzikë, Radio Tirana	All shows	Andri Xhahu	
Armenia	AMPTV	Armenia 1	Semi-finals	Erik Antaranyan and Anna Avanesyan	
Armenia	AMPTV	Armenia 1	Final	Tigran Danielyan and Arevik Udumyan	
Austria	ORF	ORF eins	All shows	Andi Knoll	
Azerbaijan	İTV	İTV, İTV Radio	All shows	Konul Arifgizi	
Belarus	BTRC	Belarus-1, Belarus 24	All shows	Evgeny Perlin	
Belgium	VRT	één, Radio 2	All shows	Peter Van de Veire and Eva Daeleman	
Belgium	RTBF	La Une	All shows	Jean-Louis Lahaye and Maureen Louys	
Belgium	RTBF	VivaCité	Final	Olivier Gilain	
Denmark	DR	DR1	Semi-finals	Anders Bisgaard	
Denmark	DR	DR1	Final	Ole Tøpholm	
Denmark	DR	DR3	Final	Peter Falktoft and Esben Bjerre Hansen	
Denmark	DR	DR Ramasjang	Final	Sign language performers	
Denmark	DR	DR P4	Final	Anders Bisgaard	
Estonia	ERR	ETV	All shows	Marko Reikop	
Estonia	ERR	Raadio 2	SF1/Final	Mart Juur and Andrus Kivirähk	
Finland	Yle	Yle TV2, Yle Radio Suomi	All shows	Finnish: Jorma Hietamäki and Sanna Pirkkalainen; Swedish: Eva Frantz and Johan Lindroos	
Finland	Yle	YLE Radio Suomi	All shows	Jorma Hietamäki and Sanna Pirkkalainen	
Finland	Yle	Yle Radio Vega	All shows	Eva Frantz and Johan Lindroos	
France	France Télévisions	France Ô	SF1	Audrey Chauveau and Bruno Berberes	
France	France Télévisions	France 3	Final	Cyril Féraud and Natasha St-Pier	
Georgia	GPB	1TV	All shows	Lado Tatishvili and Tamuna Museridze	
Germany	ARD	EinsPlus, Einsfestival	All shows (Note: Broadcasts of all shows in Germany on Einsfestival were delayed)	Peter Urban	
Germany	ARD	Phoenix	Semi-finals	Peter Urban	
Germany	ARD	Das Erste	Final	Peter Urban	
Greece	NERIT	NERIT1, NERIT HD	All shows	Maria Kozakou	
Greece	NERIT	NERIT1, NERIT HD	Final	Giorgos Kapoutzidis	
Hungary	MTVA	M1	All shows	Gábor Gundel Takács	
Iceland	RÚV	RÚV, Rás 2	All shows	Felix Bergsson	
Ireland	RTÉ	RTÉ Two	Semi-finals	Marty Whelan	
Ireland	RTÉ	RTÉ One	Final	Marty Whelan	
Ireland	RTÉ	RTÉ Radio 1	SF2/Final	Shay Byrne and Zbyszek Zalinski	
Israel	IBA	Channel 1	All shows	No commentary; Hebrew subtitles	
Israel	IBA	Channel 33	All shows	No commentary; Arabic subtitles	
Israel	IBA	IBA 88FM	All shows	Kobi Menora and Yuval Caspin	
Italy	RAI	Rai 4	Semi-finals	Marco Ardemagni and Filippo Solibello	
Italy	RAI	Rai 2	Final	Linus and Nicola Savino	
Latvia	LTV	LTV1	All shows	Valters Frīdenbergs and Kārlis Būmeisters	
Lithuania	LRT	LRT, LRT Radijas	All shows	Darius Užkuraitis	
Macedonia	MRT	MRT 1, MRT Sat, Radio Skopje	All shows	Karolina Petkovska	
Malta	PBS	TVM	All shows	Carlo Borg Bonaci	
Moldova	TRM	Moldova 1, Radio Moldova	All shows	Daniela Babici	
Montenegro	RTCG	TVCG 1, TVCG Sat	All shows	Dražen Bauković and Tamara Ivanković	
Montenegro	RTCG	Radio Crne Gore, Radio 98	All shows	Sonja Savović and Sanja Pejović	
Netherlands	AVROTROS	Nederland 1, BVN	All shows	Cornald Maas and Jan Smit	
Norway	NRK	NRK1	All shows	Olav Viksmo-Slettan	
Norway	NRK	NRK3	Final	Ronny Brede Aase, Silje Nordnes and Line Elvsåshagen	
Poland	TVP	TVP1, TVP HD, TVP Polonia, TVP Rozrywka	All shows (Note: The three shows were broadcast on TVP Rozrywka with a one day delay.)	Artur Orzech	
Portugal	RTP	RTP1	All shows (Note: RTP provided a delayed same-day broadcast of the second semi-final.)	Sílvia Alberto	
Romania	TVR	TVR 1, TVRi, TVR HD	All shows	Bogdan Stănescu	
Russia	RTR	Russia-1	All shows	Olga Shelest and Dmitry Guberniev	
San Marino	SMRTV	San Marino RTV, Radio San Marino	All shows	Lia Fiorio and Gigi Restivo	
San Marino	SMRTV	SMtv Web TV	All shows	John Kennedy O'Connor and Jamarie Milkovic	
Slovenia	RTVSLO	TV SLO 2	Semi-finals	Andrej Hofer	
Slovenia	RTVSLO	TV SLO 1, Televizija Maribor	Final	Andrej Hofer	
Slovenia	RTVSLO	Radio Val 202, Radio Maribor	SF2/Final	Andrej Hofer	
Spain	RTVE	La 2	SF1	José María Íñigo	
Spain	RTVE	La 1	Final	José María Íñigo	
Spain	Ábside Media	Cadena COPE	Final	Paco González and Tiempo de juego team	
Spain	PRISA	Ona FM – Cadena SER Catalunya	Final	Sergi Mas	
Sweden	SVT	SVT1	All shows	Malin Olsson and Edward af Sillén	
Sweden	SR	SR P4	All shows	Carolina Norén and Ronnie Ritterland	
Switzerland	SRG SSR	SRF zwei	Semi-finals	Sven Epiney	
Switzerland	SRG SSR	SRF 1	Final	Sven Epiney	
Switzerland	SRG SSR	RTS Deux	SF2	Jean-Marc Richard and Valérie Ogier	
Switzerland	SRG SSR	RTS Un	Final	Jean-Marc Richard and Valérie Ogier	
Switzerland	SRG SSR	RSI La 2	SF2	Sandy Altermatt and Alessandro Bertoglio	
Switzerland	SRG SSR	RSI La 1	Final	Sandy Altermatt and Alessandro Bertoglio	
Ukraine	NTU	Pershyi Natsionalnyi	All shows	Timur Miroshnychenko and Tetyana Terekhova	
Ukraine	UR	UR-2	All shows	Olena Zelinchenko	
United Kingdom	BBC	BBC Three	Semi-finals	Scott Mills and Laura Whitmore	
United Kingdom	BBC	BBC One	Final	Graham Norton	
United Kingdom	BBC	BBC Radio 2 Eurovision	SF2	Ana Matronic	
United Kingdom	BBC	BBC Radio 2	Final	Ken Bruce	

Broadcasters and commentators in non-participating countries
Country	Broadcaster	Channel(s)	Show(s)	Commentator(s)	Ref(s)
Australia	SBS	SBS One	All shows	Julia Zemiro and Sam Pang	
Canada	OutTV		All shows (Note: OutTV broadcast the three shows in Canada between 20–22 June 2014.)	Adam Rollins and Tommy D.	
China	Unknown				
Croatia	HRT	HRT 1, HR 2	Final	Aleksandar Kostadinov	
Cyprus	CyBC	RIK 1	All shows	Melina Karageorgiou	
Faroe Islands	KvF		All shows	Unknown	
Kazakhstan	Khabar Agency	Khabar TV	All shows	Diana Snegina and Kaldybek Zhaysanbay	
New Zealand	BBC	BBC UKTV	All shows	Unknown	
Serbia	RTS	RTS1, RTS Digital, RTS SAT, RTS HD	All shows	Silvana Grujić	
Slovakia	RTVS	Rádio FM	Semi-finals	Daniel Baláž and Pavol Hubinák	
Slovakia	RTVS	Rádio FM	Final	Daniel Baláž, Pavol Hubinák and Juraj Kemka	

== Incidents and controversies ==
=== Armenian contestant's statements ===
On the week of the contest, Armenian contestant Aram Mp3 commented on Conchita Wurst's image by saying that her lifestyle was "not natural" and that she needed to decide to be either a woman or a man. The statement sparked controversy, following which Aram Mp3 apologised and added that what he said was meant to be a joke. Wurst accepted the apology, by stating, "I have to say that if it's a joke it's not funny... but he apologised and that's fine for me."

=== Georgia jury votes ===
Georgia's jury votes in the Grand Final were all declared invalid, as all the jury members had voted exactly the same from 3 points up to 12 points. According to the EBU, this constitutes a statistical impossibility. Therefore, Georgia's points in the Grand Final solely consisted of the country's televoting results.

=== Lithuanian spokesperson's commentary ===
Lithuanian spokesperson Ignas Krupavičius, just before announcing that ten points of his country's vote had been assigned to Conchita Wurst, referred to Wurst's beard in saying "Now it is time to shave", then pulled out a razor and pretended to shave his own face, before giggling at the joke. Host Nikolaj Koppel replied "Time to shave? I think not.", because the next country to announce the votes was Austria. Gay British commentator Graham Norton also expressed his frustration at the joke and supported Koppel's reply.

=== Reaction to Russia's performance ===
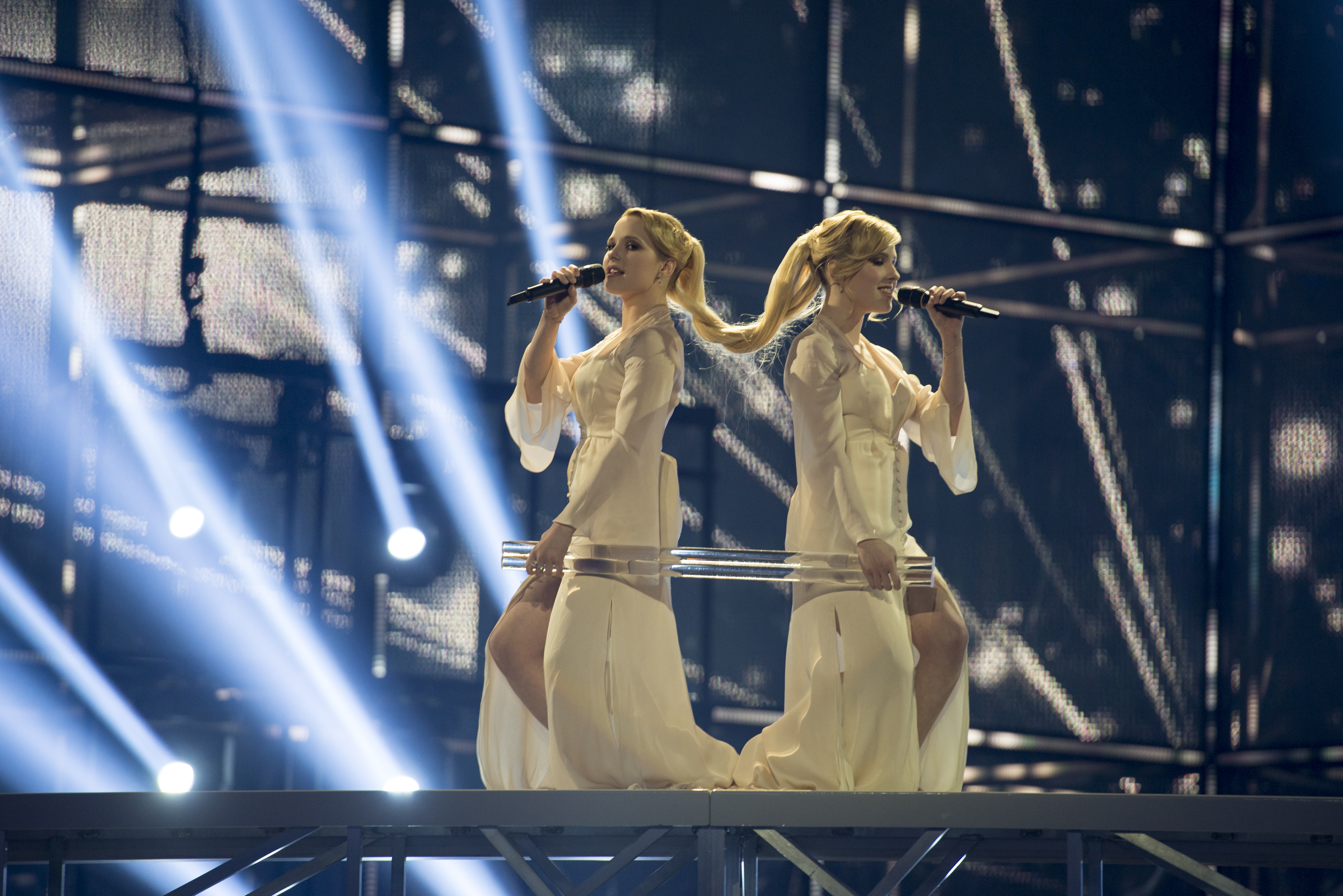
The sisters representing Russia with the song "Shine"

Russia's Tolmachevy Sisters were the subject of booing from the audience, during the semi-final and when they were announced to have qualified for the final. Russia's act were also booed during the final; and when the Russian spokesperson delivered their top-three votes. The booing was also heard when countries awarded points to Russia, including neighbouring countries such as Armenia and Belarus.

Fraser Nelson, editor of The Spectator magazine, wrote: "I can’t remember the last time I heard a Eurovision audience boo anyone; during the Iraq war in 2003, no one booed Britain. [...] There’s a difference between the Russian government and the Russian people, and the girls were there to represent the latter. They didn’t deserve the obloquy. And the Danes were wrong to have made the booing so audible."

=== Security breach ===
After Conchita Wurst had won and performed the song again, and shortly before the end of the television broadcast, press photographers crowded around Wurst for pictures. During the photo session, a fan managed to breach security and approach Wurst, giving her flowers and a Danish flag. As security personnel realised the flower giver was not supposed to be there, they began to drag him away, and the fan showed a piece of paper reading "#free anakata".

== Other awards ==
In addition to the main winner's trophy, the Marcel Bezençon Awards and the Barbara Dex Award were contested during the 2014 Eurovision Song Contest. The OGAE, "General Organisation of Eurovision Fans" voting poll also took place before the contest. The Premios Ondas (English: Wave Awards) have honoured the production values of the Eurovision Song Contest 2014 in one of their categories.

=== Marcel Bezençon Awards ===
The Marcel Bezençon Awards, organised since 2002 by Sweden's then-Head of Delegation and 1992 representative Christer Björkman, and 1984 winner Richard Herrey, honours songs in the contest's final. The awards are divided into three categories: Artistic Award, Composers Award, and Press Award.

Category	Country	Song	Artist	Songwriter(s)
Artistic Award	Netherlands	"Calm After the Storm"	The Common Linnets	Ilse DeLange; JB Meijers; Rob Crosby; Matthew Crosby; Jake Etheridge
Composers Award	Netherlands	"Calm After the Storm"	The Common Linnets	Ilse DeLange; JB Meijers; Rob Crosby; Matthew Crosby; Jake Etheridge
Press Award	Austria	"Rise Like a Phoenix"	Conchita Wurst	Charlie Mason; Joey Patulka; Ali Zuckowski; Julian Maas

=== OGAE ===
OGAE, an organisation of over forty Eurovision Song Contest fan clubs across Europe and beyond, conducts an annual voting poll first held in 2002 as the Marcel Bezençon Fan Award. After all votes were cast, the top-ranked entry in the 2014 poll was "Undo" performed by Sanna Nielsen; the top five results are shown below.

Country	Song	Artist	Points
Sweden	"Undo"	Sanna Nielsen	354
Hungary	"Running"	András Kállay-Saunders	262
Israel	"Same Heart"	Mei Finegold	233
Austria	"Rise Like a Phoenix"	Conchita Wurst	221
United Kingdom	"Children of the Universe"	Molly	162

=== Barbara Dex Award ===
The Barbara Dex Award is a humorous fan award given to the worst dressed artist each year. Named after Belgium's representative who came last in the 1993 contest, wearing her self-designed dress, the award was handed by the fansite House of Eurovision.

Place	Country	Artist	Votes
1	Lithuania	Vilija Matačiūnaitė	311
2	Italy	Emma	90
3	Moldova	Cristina Scarlat	90
4	Georgia	The Shin and Mariko	76
5	Albania	Hersi	64

=== Ondas Awards ===
Premios Ondas is an award ceremony organised by Radio Barcelona, a subsidiary of Cadena SER, since 1954. They are awarded in recognition of professionals in the fields of radio and television broadcasting, the cinema, and the music industry. The 61st Ondas Award recipients were announced on 6 November 2014, where Danish broadcaster DR, and the European Broadcasting Union received the International Television Award, for their production of the 2014 Eurovision Song Contest. The award was handed over on 25 November 2014 at the Liceu in Barcelona.

Year	Nominee / work	Award	Result
2014	DR – European Broadcasting Union	International Television Award	Won

== Official album ==
Cover art of the official album

Eurovision Song Contest: Copenhagen 2014 was the official compilation album of the 2014 contest, put together by the European Broadcasting Union and released by Universal Music Group on 14 April 2014. The album featured all 37 songs that entered in the 2014 contest, including the semi-finalists that failed to qualify into the grand final. It also featured the contest's anthem "Rainmaker", performed by the 2013 winner Emmelie de Forest.

=== Charts ===
Chart (2014)	Peak position
Australian Albums (ARIA)	13
Austrian Compilation Albums (Ö3 Austria)	5
Belgian Compilation Albums (Ultratop 50 Flanders)	6
Belgian Compilation Albums (Ultratop 50 Wallonia)	14
Danish Compilation Albums (Tracklisten)	1
Dutch Compilation Albums (Compilation Top 30)	5
Finnish Albums (Suomen virallinen lista)	7
German Compilation Albums (Offizielle Top 100)	2
Norwegian Albums (VG-lista)	3
Swiss Compilation Albums (Swiss Hitparade)	2
UK Compilation Albums (Official Charts)	8

== See also ==
- ABU Radio Song Festival 2014
- ABU TV Song Festival 2014
- Eurovision Young Musicians 2014
- Junior Eurovision Song Contest 2014
- Türkvizyon Song Contest 2014
