= Kaneswaran =

Kaneswaran is a surname. Notable people with the surname include:

- Hazel Kaneswaran (born 1977), Irish singer
- Siva Kaneswaran (born 1988), Irish singer
