= Kasey Smith =

Kasey Smith may refer to:

- Kasey Smith (singer), former member of Wonderland and the Irish representative in the Eurovision Song Contest 2014
- Kasey Smith, American keyboardist who was a member of Danger Danger
