= Ryan Dolan =

Irish pop singer (born 1985)

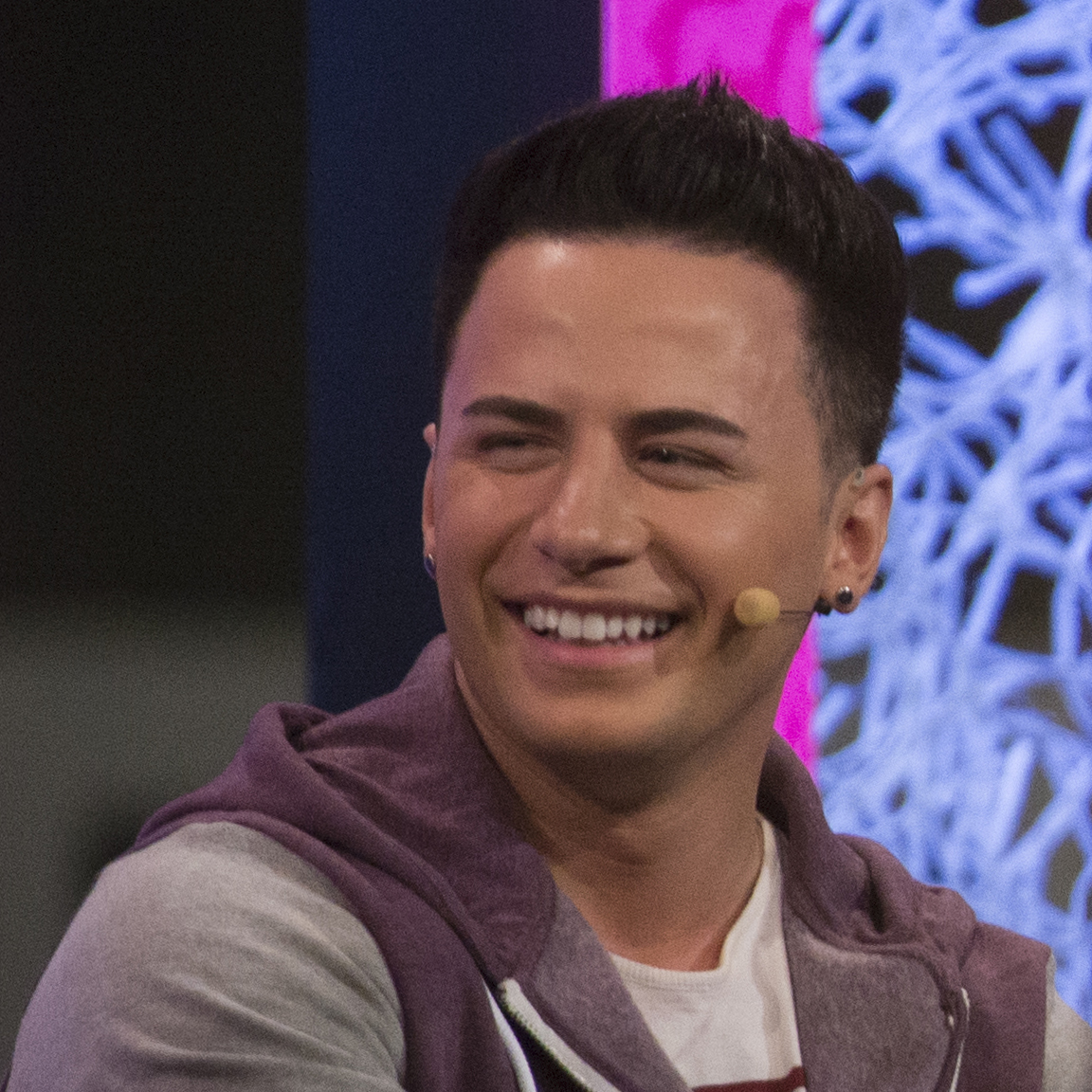
- Ryan Dolan at a press conference four days before the Eurovision Song Contest 2013.

Background information
- Born: 22 July 1985 (age 41); Strabane, County Tyrone, Northern Ireland
- Genre: Pop
- Occupation: Singer-songwriter
- Years active: 2012–present
- Website: ryandolanofficial.com

Ryan Dolan (born 22 July 1985) is an Irish pop singer from Strabane in County Tyrone, Northern Ireland. He is known for representing Ireland in the Eurovision Song Contest 2013 with "Only Love Survives".

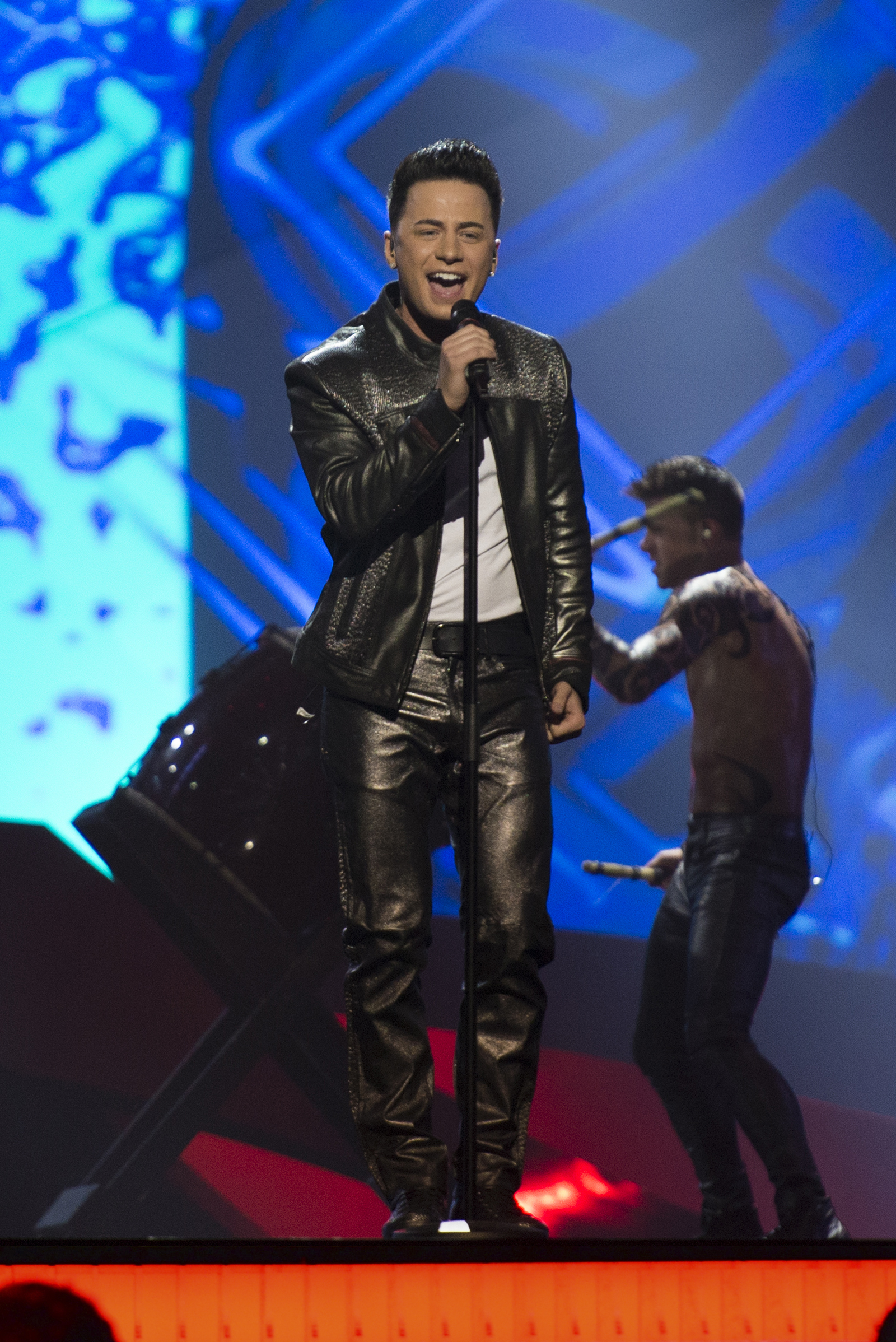
Dolan singing for Ireland during the 2013 Eurovision Song Contest.

== Career ==
=== 2013–2014: Eurovision Song Contest and Frequency ===
His song "Only Love Survives" won Ireland's Eurosong 2013 song contest, and Dolan went on to represent Ireland in the Eurovision Song Contest 2013 in Malmö, Sweden. He performed the song in the first semi-final at Malmö Arena on 14 May 2013, and qualified for the final after finishing in the top ten. In the final, held on 18 May 2013, Dolan finished last in the final, receiving only five points from three countries.

He released his debut album Frequency on 13 May 2013. On 7 March 2014, he released his second single "Start Again" after his coming out on RTÉ Radio 1. Its music video is a story of suicide of a gay boy. It has been watched more than one million times on YouTube. He gained attention from LGBT communities and sang in some pride festivals including Pride in Newry 2014 and Bristol Pride 2015. On 20 June 2014, he released his third single "Fall to the Floor". It performed moderately in music chart, charted at 88 on Irish Recorded Music Association.

=== 2015–present: Eurovision Song Contest 2015 and Under the Covers, Vol.1 ===
In the Eurovision Song Contest 2015, he was one of the five members of the Irish jury. On 20 November 2015, he released his fourth single Uptown Downtown. He uploaded his cover of "Hello" by Adele on YouTube on 18 December 2015 and from then, he's uploading several cover songs like "Pillowtalk" by Zayn Malik and "Hands to Myself" by Selena Gomez. On 19 February 2016, he released a cover album Under the Covers, Vol.1.

== Personal life ==
During an interview on RTÉ Radio 1 in February 2014, Dolan came out as gay. He said, "In school I was confused about who I was, and it was really hard for me growing up because of that. It was hard to deal with because I knew that I was gay, but I couldn't get the courage to talk to someone about it".

In November 2019, Dolan bought a pub in County Tyrone with SDLP MLA Daniel McCrossan.

== Discography ==
=== Albums ===
Title	Details
Frequency	Released: 13 May 2013; Label: JM13; Format: Digital download, CD
Under the Covers, Vol.1	Released: 16 February 2016; Label: self-release; Format: Digital download, CD
Under the Covers, Vol.2	Released: 2016; Label: Format: Digital download, CD
Deep Covers	Released: 2017; Label: Format: Digital download, CD

=== Singles ===
Title	Year	Peak chart positions			Album
Title	Year	IRE	BEL (Fl)	UK Indie	Album
"Only Love Survives"	2013	17	67^{[A]}	33	Frequency
"Start Again"	2014	71	—	—	TBA
"Fall to the Floor"	2014	88	—	—	TBA
"Uptown Downtown"	2015	—	—	—	TBA
"—" denotes a single that did not chart or was not released.

Notes

A Did not appear in the official Belgian Ultratop 50 charts, but rather in the bubbling under Ultratip charts. Added 50 position to actual Ultratip position.

Awards and achievements
Preceded by Jedward with "Waterline"	Ireland in the Eurovision Song Contest; 2013	Succeeded by Can-linn featuring Kasey Smith with "Heartbeat"
