= Ireland in the Eurovision Song Contest 2014 =

- Eurovision Song Contest 2014
- Participating broadcaster: Raidió Teilifís Éireann (RTÉ)
- Country: Ireland
- Selection process: Eurosong 2014
- Selection date: 28 February 2014

Competing entry
- Song: "Heartbeat"
- Artist: Can-linn feat. Kasey Smith
- Songwriters: Jonas Gladnikoff; Rasmus Palmgren; Patrizia Helander; Hazel Kaneswaran

Placement
- Semi-final result: Failed to qualify (12th)

Participation chronology

Ireland was represented at the Eurovision Song Contest 2014 with the song "Heartbeat", written by Jonas Gladnikoff, Rasmus Palmgren, Patrizia Helander, and Hazel Kaneswaran, and performed by Can-linn featuring Kasey Smith. The Irish participating broadcaster, Raidió Teilifís Éireann (RTÉ), organised the national final Eurosong 2014 in order to select its entry for the contest. Five songs faced the votes of five regional juries and a public televote, ultimately resulting in the selection of "Heartbeat" performed by Can-linn featuring Kasey Smith as the Irish Eurovision entry.

Ireland was drawn to compete in the second semi-final of the Eurovision Song Contest which took place on 8 May 2014. Performing during the show in position 9, "Heartbeat" was not announced among the top 10 entries of the second semi-final and therefore did not qualify to compete in the final. It was later revealed that Ireland placed twelfth out of the 15 participating countries in the semi-final with 35 points.

== Background ==
Prior to the 2014 contest, Raidió Teilifís Éireann (RTÉ) and its predecessor national broadcasters have participated in the Eurovision Song Contest representing Ireland forty-seven times since RÉ's first entry in 1965. They have won the contest a record seven times in total. Their first win came in 1970, with "All Kinds of Everything" performed by Dana. Ireland holds the record for being the only country to win the contest three times in a row (in 1992, 1993, and 1994), as well as having the only three-time winner (Johnny Logan, who won in 1980 as a singer, 1987 as a singer-songwriter, and again in 1992 as a songwriter). In 2011 and 2012, Jedward represented the country for two consecutive years, managing to qualify to the final both times and achieve Ireland's highest position in the contest since 2000, placing eighth in 2011 with the song "Lipstick". In 2013, "Only Love Survives" performed by Ryan Dolan, managed to qualify to the final but placed last.

As part of its duties as participating broadcaster, RTÉ organises the selection of its entry in the Eurovision Song Contest and broadcasts the event in the country. The broadcaster confirmed its intentions to participate at the 2014 contest on 20 May 2013. From 2008 to 2013, RTÉ had set up the national final Eurosong to choose both the song and performer to compete at Eurovision for Ireland, with both the public and regional jury groups involved in the selection. For the 2014 contest, RTÉ announced on 31 October 2014 the organisation of Eurosong 2014 to choose the artist and song.

== Before Eurovision ==
=== Eurosong 2014 ===
Eurosong 2014 was the national final format developed by RTÉ in order to select itss entry for the Eurovision Song Contest 2014. The competition was held on 28 February 2014 at the Studio 4 of RTÉ in Dublin, hosted by Ryan Tubridy and broadcast on RTÉ One during a special edition of The Late Late Show. The show was also broadcast online via RTÉ's official website rte.ie and the official Eurovision Song Contest website eurovision.tv. The national final was watched by 686,000 viewers in Ireland with a market share of 50%.

==== Competing entries ====
On 31 October 2013, RTÉ revealed the five music industry professionals that were invited to each select and mentor an entry for the competition: guitarist for Irish rock-band Aslan Billy McGuinness, RTÉ 2fm presenter and lead singer of Kerbdog Cormac Battle, singer-songwriter Hazel Kaneswaran, tour manager Mark Murphy and band manager Valerie Roe. The mentors had until 3 January 2014 to submit details of their selected artist and song, and until 3 February 2014 to submit the recorded versions of the songs for the competition. The five finalists were announced on 5 February 2014, while their songs were presented on 6 February 2014 during Mooney on RTÉ Radio 1.

Artist	Song	Songwriter(s)	Mentor
Andrew Mann	"Be Mine"	Cormac Battle	Cormac Battle
Can-linn feat. Kasey Smith	"Heartbeat"	Jonas Gladnikoff, Rasmus Palmgren, Patrizia Helander, Hazel Kaneswaran	Hazel Kaneswaran
Eoghan Quigg	"The Movie Song"	Karl Broderick	Mark Murphy
Laura O'Neill	"You Don't Remember Me"	Don Mescall, Lucie Silvas	Billy McGuinness
Patricia Roe	"Don't Hold On"	Patricia Roe	Valerie Roe

==== Final ====
The national final took place on 28 February 2014 and featured guest performances from former contest winners Johnny Logan, Paul Harrington and Charlie McGettigan as well as commentary from a panel that consisted of music manager Louis Walsh, presenter Eoghan McDermott, producer Maia Dunphy, and singer and former contest winner Linda Martin. Following the 50/50 combination of votes from five regional juries and public televoting, "Heartbeat" performed by Can-linn featuring Kasey Smith was selected as the winner.

Final – 28 February 2014
R/O	Artist	Song	Jury	Televote	Total	Place
1	Patricia Roe	"Don't Hold On"	26	30	56	4
2	Eoghan Quigg	"The Movie Song"	52	50	102	2
3	Can-linn feat. Kasey Smith	"Heartbeat"	54	60	114	1
4	Andrew Mann	"Be Mine"	24	20	44	5
5	Laura O'Neill	"You Don't Remember Me"	44	40	84	3

Detailed Regional Jury Votes
R/O	Song	Cork	Limerick	Galway	Sligo	Dublin	Total
1	"Don't Hold On"	6	6	4	4	6	26
2	"The Movie Song"	10	10	10	12	10	52
3	"Heartbeat"	8	12	12	10	12	54
4	"Be Mine"	4	4	6	6	4	24
5	"You Don't Remember Me"	12	8	8	8	8	44

== At Eurovision ==
Can-linn and Kasey Smith presenting themselves and "Heartbeat" at the Eurovision Song Contest 2014

According to Eurovision rules, all nations with the exceptions of the host country and the "Big Five" (France, Germany, Italy, Spain and the United Kingdom) are required to qualify from one of two semi-finals in order to compete for the final; the top ten countries from each semi-final progress to the final. The European Broadcasting Union (EBU) split up the competing countries into six different pots based on voting patterns from previous contests, with countries with favourable voting histories put into the same pot. On 20 January 2014, a special allocation draw was held which placed each country into one of the two semi-finals, as well as which half of the show they would perform in. Ireland was placed into the second semi-final, to be held on 8 May 2014, and was scheduled to perform in the second half of the show.

Once all the competing songs for the 2014 contest had been released, the running order for the semi-finals was decided by the shows' producers rather than through another draw, so that similar songs were not placed next to each other. Ireland was set to perform in position 9, following the entry from Finland and before the entry from Belarus.

In Ireland, the semi-finals were broadcast on RTÉ2 and the final was broadcast on RTÉ One with commentary by Marty Whelan. The second semi-final and final were also broadcast via radio on RTÉ Radio 1 with commentary by Shay Byrne and Zbyszek Zalinski. The Irish spokesperson, who announced the Irish votes during the final, was Nicky Byrne.

=== Final ===
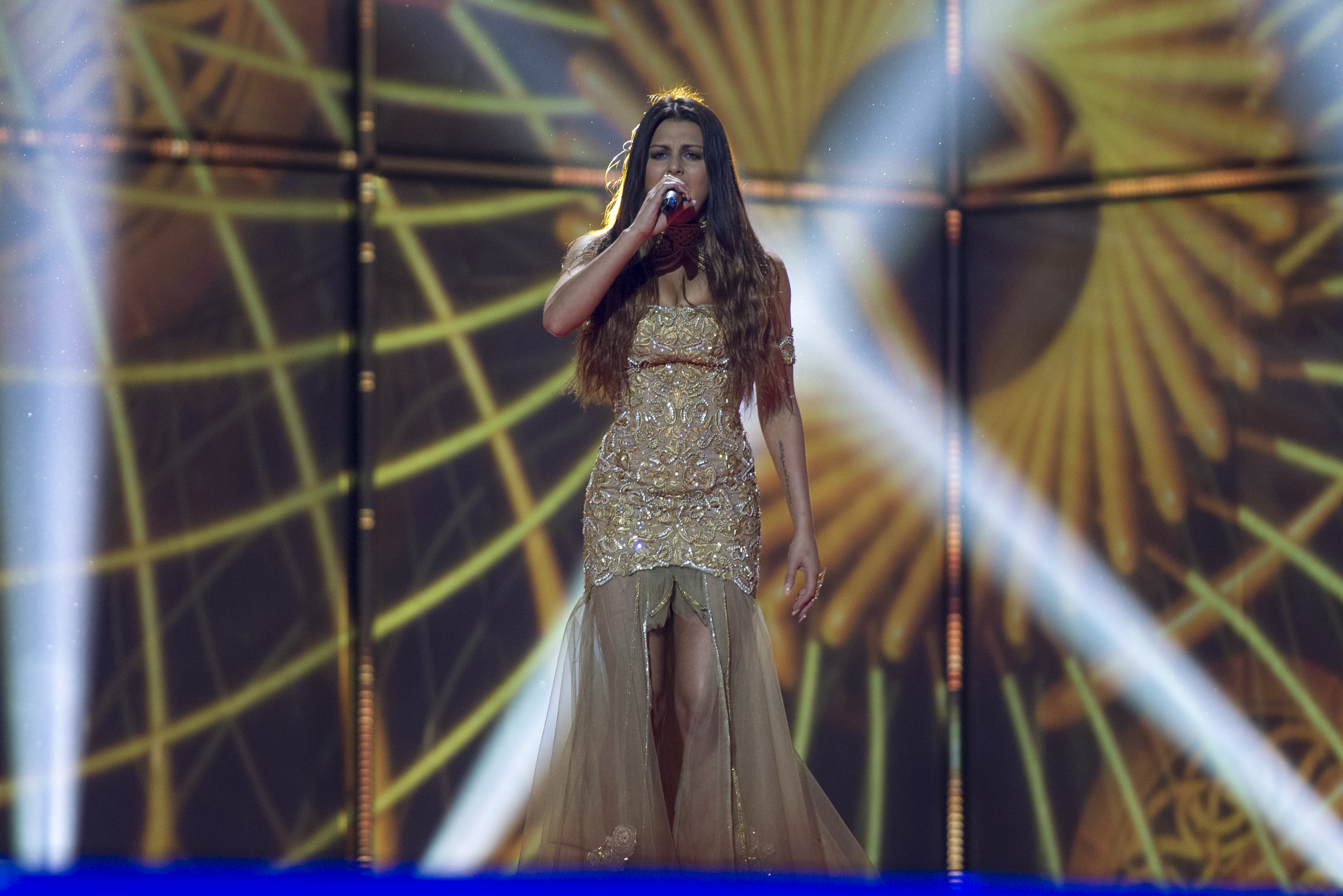
Kasey Smith during a rehearsal before the second semi-final

Can-linn and Kasey Smith took in technical rehearsals on 30 April and 3 May, followed by dress rehearsals on 7 and 8 May. This included the jury show on 7 May where the professional juries of each country watched and voted on the competing entries.

The Irish performance featured Kasey Smith performing with the members of Can-linn which included two dancers, Thomas Spratt and Tarik Shebani, and two backing vocalists, Jenny Bowden and Donna Bissett. The performers were joined on stage by violinist Denice Doyle. The stage colours were red, yellow and orange with Celtic inspired shapes and patterns against a backdrop that transitioned from dark seas with lightning bolts to an orange sky with green water. The dress Kasey Smith wore was designed by Kathy de Stafford with a neckpiece designed by Oliver Doherty Duncan.

At the end of the show, Ireland was not announced among the top 10 entries in the second semi-final and therefore failed to qualify to compete in the final. It was later revealed that Ireland placed twelfth in the semi-final, receiving a total of 35 points.

=== Voting ===
Voting during the three shows consisted of 50 percent public televoting and 50 percent from a jury deliberation. The jury consisted of five music industry professionals who were citizens of the country they represent, with their names published before the contest to ensure transparency. This jury was asked to judge each contestant based on: vocal capacity; the stage performance; the song's composition and originality; and the overall impression by the act. In addition, no member of a national jury could be related in any way to any of the competing acts in such a way that they cannot vote impartially and independently. The individual rankings of each jury member were released shortly after the grand final.

Following the release of the full split voting by the EBU after the conclusion of the competition, it was revealed that Ireland had placed tenth with the public televote and fourteenth with the jury vote in the second semi-final. In the public vote, Ireland scored 47 points, while with the jury vote, Ireland scored 33 points.

Below is a breakdown of points awarded to Ireland and awarded by Ireland in the second semi-final and grand final of the contest, and the breakdown of the jury voting and televoting conducted during the two shows:

==== Points awarded to Ireland ====
Points awarded to Ireland (Semi-final 2)
Score	Country
12 points	
10 points	
8 points	
7 points	Macedonia
6 points	
5 points	Poland; United Kingdom
4 points	Austria; Malta
3 points	Norway
2 points	Greece; Romania
1 point	Israel; Slovenia; Switzerland

==== Points awarded by Ireland ====
Points awarded by Ireland (Semi-final 2)
Score	Country
12 points	Austria
10 points	Finland
8 points	Norway
7 points	Romania
6 points	Switzerland
5 points	Lithuania
4 points	Greece
3 points	Malta
2 points	Poland
1 point	Belarus

Points awarded by Ireland (Final)
Score	Country
12 points	Austria
10 points	Netherlands
8 points	United Kingdom
7 points	Norway
6 points	Spain
5 points	Switzerland
4 points	Sweden
3 points	Malta
2 points	Romania
1 point	Hungary

==== Detailed voting results ====
The following members comprised the Irish jury:

- Patrick Hughes (jury chairperson) – General Manager Sony Music Ireland
- Charlie McGettigan – singer, songwriter, winner of the Eurovision Song Contest 1994
- Leanne Moore – singer, journalist, presenter
- Jenny Greene – DJ, radio presenter
- Liam Reilly – singer, songwriter, represented Ireland in the 1990 contest

Detailed voting results from Ireland (Semi-final 2)
R/O	Country	P. Hughes	C. McGettigan	L. Moore	J. Greene	L. Reilly	Jury Rank	Televote Rank	Combined Rank	Points
01	Malta	5	3	1	12	7	4	10	8	3
02	Israel	7	4	7	4	12	6	12	11	
03	Norway	2	1	4	5	1	2	8	3	8
04	Georgia	14	9	14	9	10	13	14	14	
05	Poland	13	14	8	13	14	14	1	9	2
06	Austria	1	2	2	1	3	1	3	1	12
07	Lithuania	12	12	11	8	11	12	2	6	5
08	Finland	6	5	5	3	2	3	5	2	10
09	Ireland									
10	Belarus	11	13	10	14	4	11	7	10	1
11	Macedonia	9	7	13	7	13	10	13	13	
12	Switzerland	8	6	6	11	5	7	6	5	6
13	Greece	3	11	3	10	6	5	9	7	4
14	Slovenia	10	8	9	6	8	9	11	12	
15	Romania	4	10	12	2	9	8	4	4	7

Detailed voting results from Ireland (Final)
R/O	Country	P. Hughes	C. McGettigan	L. Moore	J. Greene	L. Reilly	Jury Rank	Televote Rank	Combined Rank	Points
01	Ukraine	19	11	19	23	22	24	15	21	
02	Belarus	24	6	23	11	7	13	16	16	
03	Azerbaijan	11	8	20	12	21	14	26	22	
04	Iceland	20	9	14	26	24	23	14	19	
05	Norway	5	2	4	4	1	2	11	4	7
06	Romania	8	25	24	1	23	18	5	9	2
07	Armenia	9	5	5	3	8	4	19	11	
08	Montenegro	23	24	21	13	12	22	25	26	
09	Poland	26	26	22	22	26	26	1	15	
10	Greece	7	23	6	7	9	7	17	12	
11	Austria	3	3	1	2	3	1	3	1	12
12	Germany	18	18	12	14	13	16	20	18	
13	Sweden	1	12	8	25	20	10	6	7	4
14	France	25	19	25	17	11	25	21	25	
15	Russia	6	20	17	24	19	20	18	20	
16	Italy	21	14	13	21	14	19	24	24	
17	Slovenia	12	7	18	19	15	12	23	17	
18	Finland	22	21	10	6	16	15	10	13	
19	Spain	2	22	11	5	6	6	8	5	6
20	Switzerland	14	15	9	16	4	8	7	6	5
21	Hungary	17	4	15	9	25	11	12	10	1
22	Malta	13	16	2	8	5	5	13	8	3
23	Denmark	15	17	16	18	10	17	9	14	
24	Netherlands	4	1	3	10	2	3	2	2	10
25	San Marino	16	10	26	20	17	21	22	23	
26	United Kingdom	10	13	7	15	18	9	4	3	8
