= Linus (deejay) =

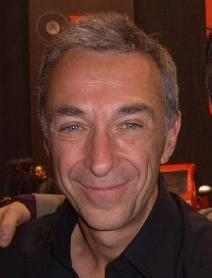
- Linus in 2009
- Born: Pasquale Di Molfetta; 30 October 1957 (age 68); Foligno, Italy
- Occupations: Radio host; artistic director
- Years active: 1976–present

Pasquale Di Molfetta (born 30 October 1957, in Foligno), better known as Linus, is an Italian radio host and the artistic director of Radio Deejay.

== Filmography ==
=== Movies ===
- Natale a casa Deejay (2004)
