= Can-linn =

Irish music group

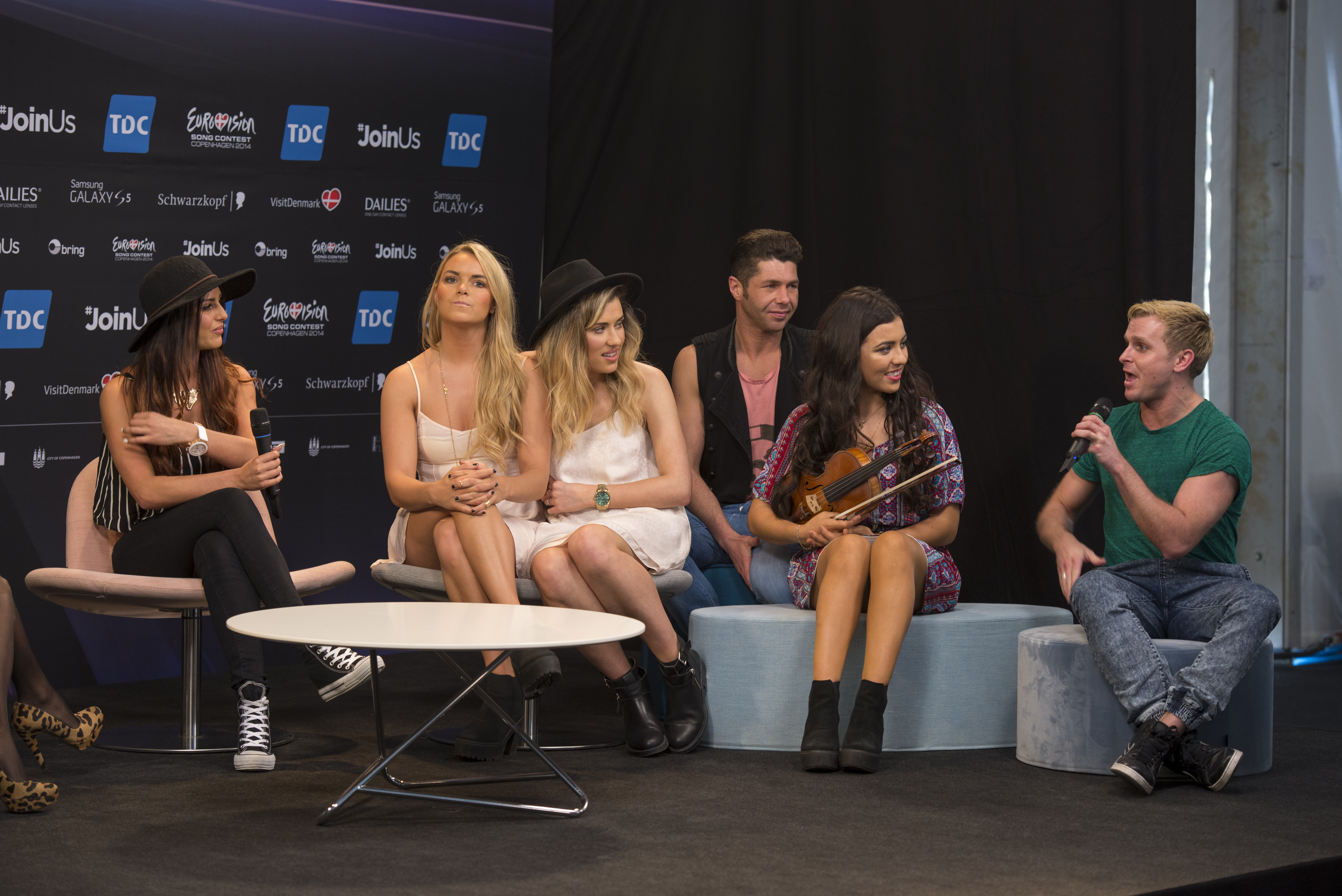
Can-linn and Kasey Smith (2014)

Can-linn is an Irish music group that represented their country at the Eurovision Song Contest 2014 in Copenhagen, Denmark along with singer Kasey Smith. "Can-linn" is derived from the Irish Can linn, "Sing with us", and consists of Denice Doyle (violin), Jenni Bowden (vocals), Donna Bissett (vocals) as well as the dancers Tarik Shebani and Thomas Spratt. They performed 9th in the second semi-final on 8 May and failed to qualify for the grand final.

== Discography ==
=== Singles ===
Title	Year	Peak chart positions	Album
Title	Year	IRE	Album
"Heartbeat" (featuring Kasey Smith)	2014	39	Non-album single

Awards and achievements
Preceded by Ryan Dolan with "Only Love Survives"	Ireland in the Eurovision Song Contest (with Kasey Smith); 2014	Succeeded by Molly Sterling with "Playing with Numbers"
