= Kasey Smith (singer) =

Irish singer

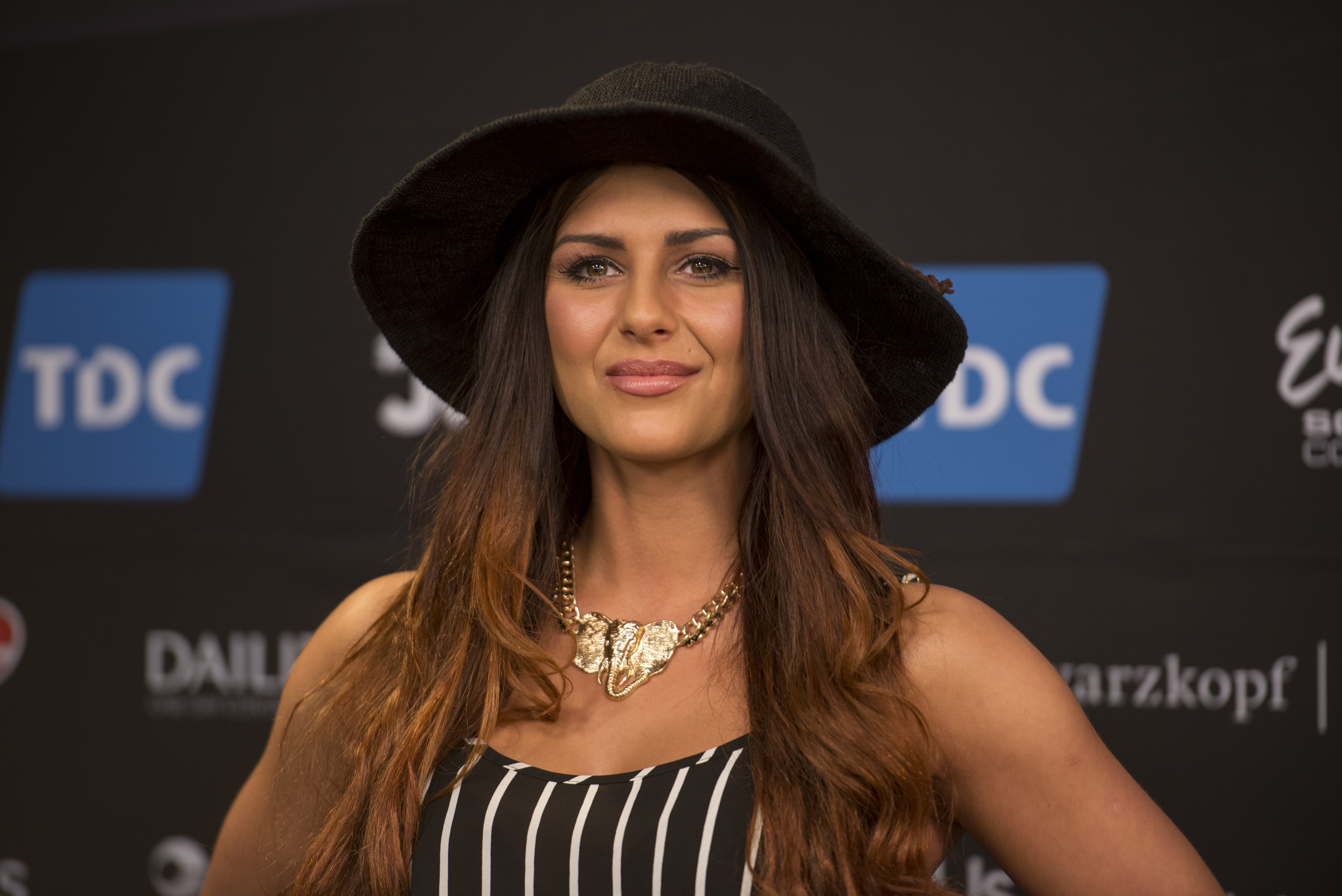
- Kasey Smith (2014)

Background information
- Born: 29 March 1990 (age 36); Dublin, Ireland
- Occupation: Singer

Kasey Smith (born 29 March 1990) is an Irish singer. Smith is a former member of the group Wonderland, which was mildly successful. She attempted to represent Ireland in the Eurovision Song Contest 2013 with the song "Kiss Me", ultimately placing third in the national final. The next year, she won Eurosong 2014 and got the chance to represent Ireland at the Eurovision Song Contest 2014 in Copenhagen, Denmark. She performed the song "Heartbeat" with the group Can-linn but failed to make it to the final.

== Personal life ==
Kasey first appeared on the music scene in 2008 when she successfully auditioned for Louis Walsh and Kian Egan's new girl band, Wonderland.

Kasey has a distinctive tattoo on her left arm that reads 'feel the fear and do it anyway.'

== Discography ==
=== Singles ===
Title	Year	Peak chart positions	Album
Title	Year	IRE	Album
"Kiss Me"	2013	—	Non-album single
"Heartbeat" (Can-linn featuring Kasey Smith)	2014	39	Non-album single

Awards and achievements
Preceded by Ryan Dolan with "Only Love Survives"	Ireland in the Eurovision Song Contest (with Can-linn); 2014	Succeeded by Molly Sterling with "Playing with Numbers"
