= France in the Eurovision Song Contest 2015 =

- Eurovision Song Contest 2015
- Participating broadcaster: France Télévisions
- Country: France
- Selection process: Internal selection
- Announcement date: 23 January 2015

Competing entry
- Song: "N'oubliez pas"
- Artist: Lisa Angell
- Songwriters: Moïse Albert; Michel Illouz; Laure Izon

Placement
- Final result: 25th, 4 points

Participation chronology

France was represented at the Eurovision Song Contest 2015 with the song "N'oubliez pas" written by Moïse Albert, Michel Illouz and Laure Izon, and performed by Lisa Angell. The French broadcaster France Télévisions in collaboration with the television channel France 2 internally selected the French entry for the 2015 contest in Vienna, Austria. "N'oubliez pas" was officially announced by France 2 as the French entry on 23 January 2015 and later the song was presented to the public as the contest entry during a live performance by Angell on 28 February 2015 during the France 2 programme Chico And The Gypsies, Le Grand Show.

As a member of the "Big Five", France automatically qualified to compete in the final of the Eurovision Song Contest. Performing in position 2, France placed twenty-fifth out of the 27 participating countries with 4 points.

== Background ==
Prior to the 2015 contest, France had participated in the Eurovision Song Contest fifty-seven times since its debut as one of seven countries to take part in 1956. France first won the contest in 1958 with "Dors, mon amour" performed by André Claveau. In the 1960s, they won three times, with "Tom Pillibi" performed by Jacqueline Boyer in 1960, "Un premier amour" performed by Isabelle Aubret in 1962 and "Un jour, un enfant" performed by Frida Boccara, who won in 1969 in a four-way tie with the Netherlands, Spain and the United Kingdom. France's fifth victory came in 1977, when Marie Myriam won with the song "L'oiseau et l'enfant". France have also finished second four times, with Paule Desjardins in 1957, Catherine Ferry in 1976, Joëlle Ursull in 1990 and Amina in 1991, who lost out to Sweden's Carola in a tie-break. In the 21st century, France has had less success, only making the top ten three times, with Natasha St-Pier finishing fourth in 2001, Sandrine François finishing fifth in 2002 and Patricia Kaas finishing eighth in 2009. In 2014, the nation finished in twenty-sixth (last) place with the song "Moustache" performed by Twin Twin.

The French national broadcaster, France Télévisions, broadcasts the event within France and announced in August 2014 that the selection of the nation's entry would be delegated to the television channel France 2; since 1999, France 3 had been responsible of selecting and organising the French entry and broadcasting the contest in France. France 2 confirmed that France would participate in the 2015 Eurovision Song Contest on 1 September 2014. The French broadcaster had used both national finals and internal selection to choose the French entry in the past. The 2014 French entry was selected via a national final that featured three competing acts. In 2015, the broadcaster opted to internally select the French entry.

== Before Eurovision ==
=== Internal selection ===
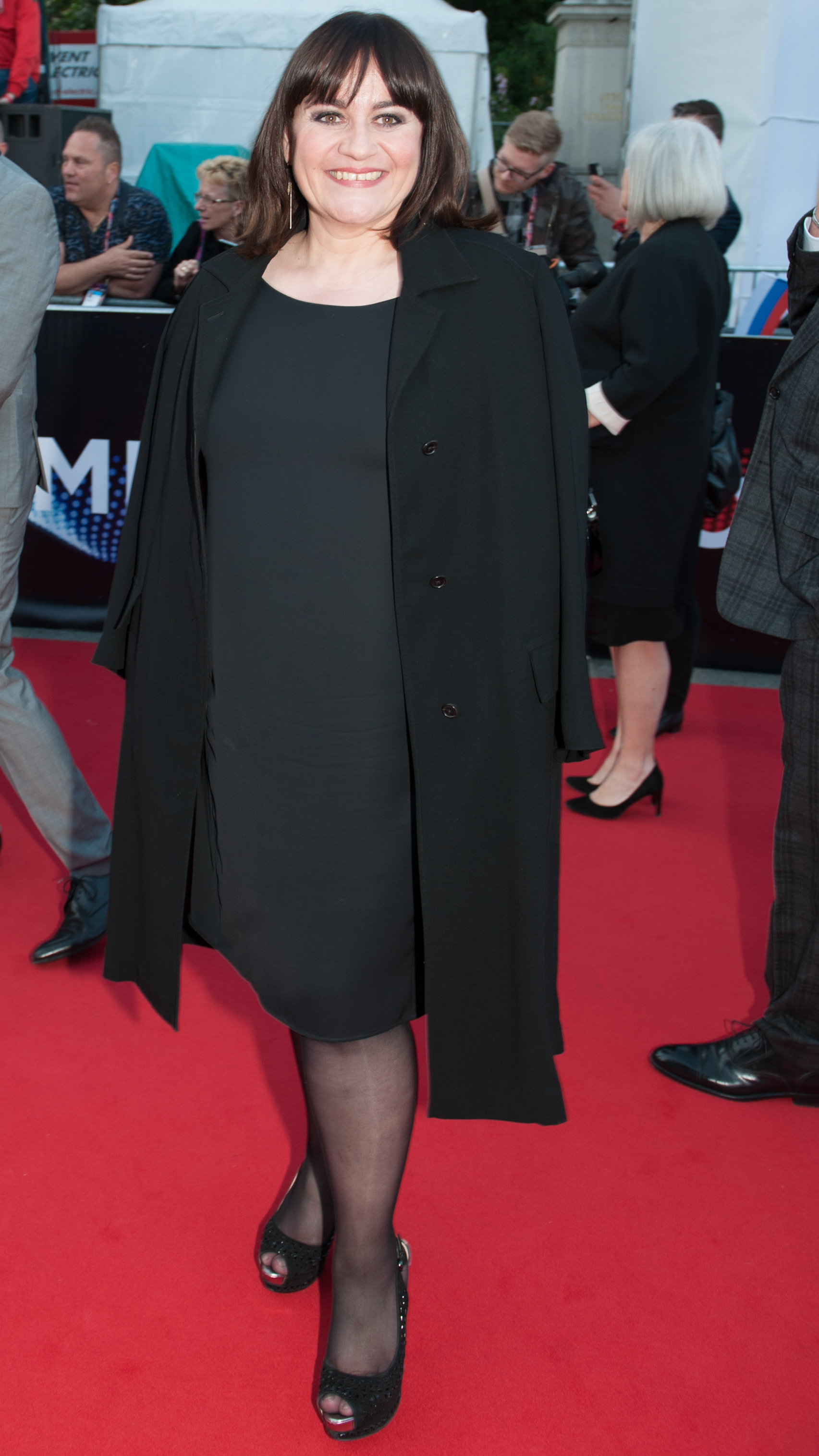
Lisa Angell was internally selected to represent France in the Eurovision Song Contest 2015

France 2 announced in late 2014 that the French entry for the 2015 Eurovision Song Contest would be selected internally. The broadcaster received 300 submissions after requesting proposals from record companies in November 2014, and France 2 entertainment director Nathalie André shortlisted three entries following a blind audio listening before finalising the decision internally together with the French Head of Delegation for the Eurovision Song Contest Frédéric Valencak.

On 23 January 2015, France 2 announced that the French entry for the Eurovision Song Contest 2015 would be "N'oubliez pas" performed by Lisa Angell. The song, which had already been performed by Angell during a First World War centenary concert held at La Madeleine, Paris in November 2014, was written by Robert Goldman (under the pseudonym Moïse Albert), Michel Illouz and Laure Izon, and according to Goldman was written with the idea of creating "a great and beautiful chanson that evokes the First World War and at heart all wars". The entry was formally presented to the public on 28 February 2015 during the France 2 programme Chico And The Gypsies, Le Grand Show, hosted by Michel Drucker.

== At Eurovision ==
According to Eurovision rules, all nations with the exceptions of the host country and the "Big Five" (France, Germany, Italy, Spain and the United Kingdom) are required to qualify from one of two semi-finals in order to compete for the final; the top ten countries from each semi-final progress to the final. In the 2015 contest, Australia also competed directly in the final as an invited guest nation. As a member of the "Big Five", France automatically qualified to compete in the final on 23 May 2015. In addition to their participation in the final, France was also required to broadcast and vote in one of the two semi-finals. During the semi-final allocation draw on 26 January 2015, France was assigned to broadcast and vote in the first semi-final on 19 May 2015.

The first semi-final was broadcast in France on France Ô with commentary by Mareva Galanter and Jérémy Parayre. The final was broadcast on France 2 with commentary by Stéphane Bern and Marianne James. The French spokesperson, who announced the French votes during the final, was Virginie Guilhaume. It was also the first time since 2000 that the Eiffel Tower was not the backdrop for the spokesperson when the French votes were announced.

=== Final ===
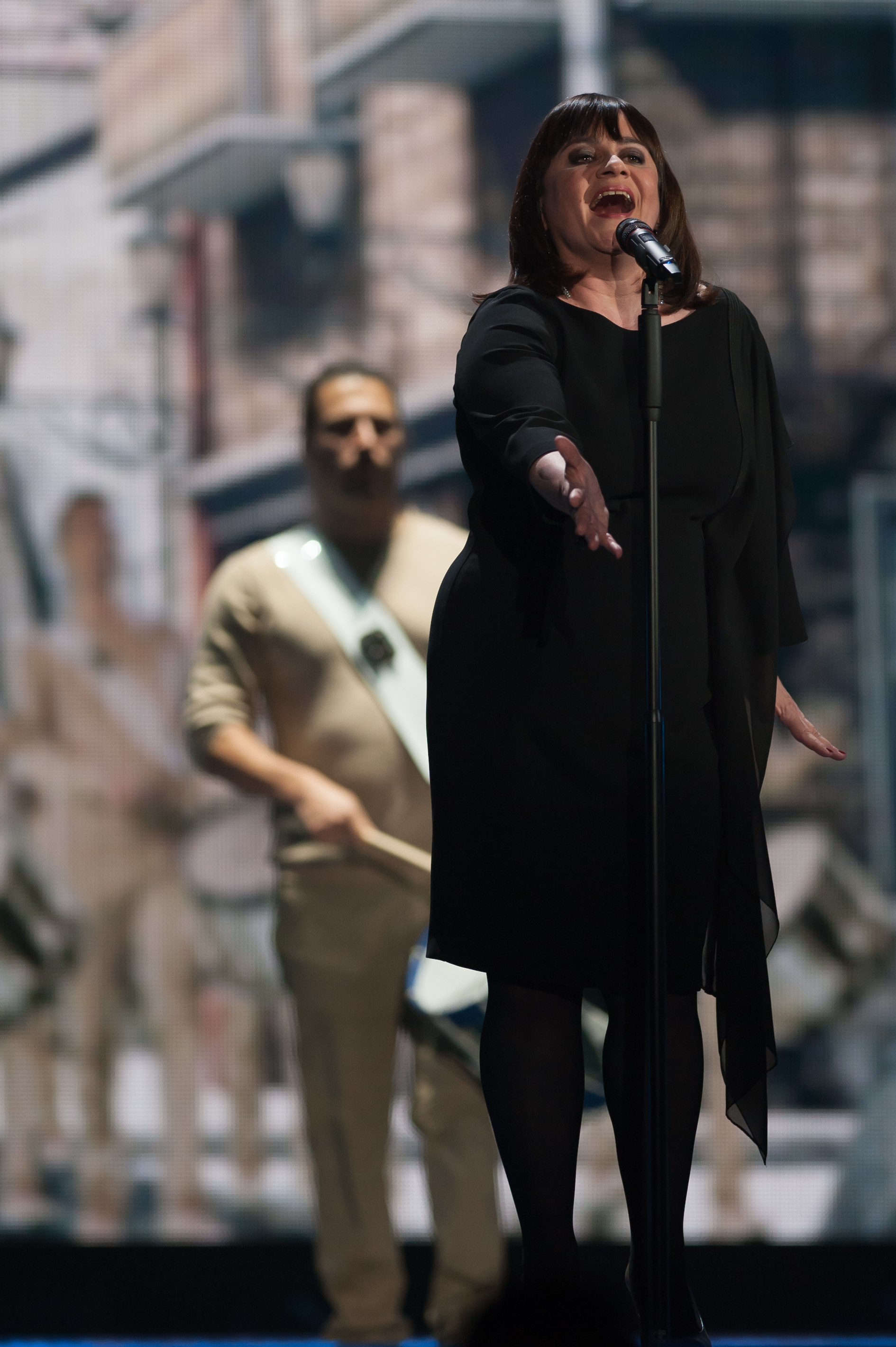
Lisa Angell during a rehearsal before the final

Lisa Angell took part in technical rehearsals on 17 and 20 May, followed by dress rehearsals on 22 and 23 May. This included the jury final where professional juries of each country, responsible for 50 percent of each country's vote, watched and voted on the competing entries. After technical rehearsals were held on 20 May, the "Big 5" countries, host nation Austria and special guest Australia held a press conference. As part of this press conference, the artists took part in a draw to determine which half of the grand final they would subsequently participate in. France was drawn to compete in the first half. Following the conclusion of the second semi-final, the shows' producers decided upon the running order of the final. The running order for the semi-finals and final was decided by the shows' producers rather than through another draw, so that similar songs were not placed next to each other. France was subsequently placed to perform in position 2, following the entry from Slovenia and before the entry from Israel.

The stage show featured Lisa Angell on stage alone wearing a black dress performing the song at a microphone stand. The story of the performance was told through the background LED screens which portrayed Lisa Angell as a woman returning to a village in ruins with war-torn landscapes and grey skies. About the performance and song, Lisa Angell stated: "It is the song about peace and hope. It was important for us to underline the role of a woman as women often stay in the shadow." As the performance progressed, the LED screens depicted hundreds of drummers, while five male drummers joined Angell on stage: Yann Forleo, Julien Botas, Benoit Crozatier and William Pigache. Lisa Angell was also joined by an off-stage backing vocalist: Delphine Elbé. France placed twenty-fifth place in the final, scoring 4 points.

=== Voting ===
Voting during the three shows consisted of 50 percent public televoting and 50 percent from a jury deliberation. The jury consisted of five music industry professionals who were citizens of the country they represent, with their names published before the contest to ensure transparency. This jury was asked to judge each contestant based on: vocal capacity; the stage performance; the song's composition and originality; and the overall impression by the act. In addition, no member of a national jury could be related in any way to any of the competing acts in such a way that they cannot vote impartially and independently. The individual rankings of each jury member were released shortly after the grand final.

Following the release of the full split voting by the EBU after the conclusion of the competition, it was revealed that France had placed twenty-sixth with the public televote and nineteenth with the jury vote. In the public vote, France scored 4 points and in the jury vote the nation scored 24 points.

Below is a breakdown of points awarded to France and awarded by France in the first semi-final and grand final of the contest, and the breakdown of the jury voting and televoting conducted during the two shows:

==== Points awarded to France ====
Points awarded to France (Final)
Score	Country
12 points	
10 points	
8 points	
7 points	
6 points	
5 points	
4 points	
3 points	Armenia
2 points	
1 point	San Marino

==== Points awarded by France ====
Points awarded by France (Semi-final 1)
Score	Country
12 points	Belgium
10 points	Russia
8 points	Romania
7 points	Albania
6 points	Hungary
5 points	Armenia
4 points	Estonia
3 points	Greece
2 points	Netherlands
1 point	Serbia

Points awarded by France (Final)
Score	Country
12 points	Belgium
10 points	Russia
8 points	Sweden
7 points	Latvia
6 points	Italy
5 points	Spain
4 points	Poland
3 points	Armenia
2 points	Australia
1 point	Hungary

==== Detailed voting results ====
The following members comprised the French jury:

- Bruno Berberes (jury chairperson) – casting director, producer, composer
- Matthieu Gonet – composer, musician
- Jimmy Bourcereau – breakdancer, singer, actor (jury member in semi-final 1)
- Éric Jean-Jean – radio DJ (jury member in the final)
- Yseult Onguenet (Yseult) – singer
- Marie Myriam – singer, winner of the Eurovision Song Contest 1977

Detailed voting results from France (Semi-final 1)
R/O	Country	B. Berberes	M. Gonet	J. Bourcereau	Yseult	M. Myriam	Jury Rank	Televote Rank	Combined Rank	Points
01	Moldova	15	6	8	14	7	11	9	11	
02	Armenia	7	12	15	15	11	14	1	6	5
03	Belgium	1	3	1	2	2	2	4	1	12
04	Netherlands	4	9	6	13	4	4	12	9	2
05	Finland	16	15	16	4	16	16	13	16	
06	Greece	5	4	10	12	5	5	10	8	3
07	Estonia	6	10	5	11	8	7	8	7	4
08	Macedonia	12	16	14	10	6	12	15	15	
09	Serbia	13	13	13	9	12	13	5	10	1
10	Hungary	3	2	4	1	3	3	11	5	6
11	Belarus	10	5	12	8	14	10	16	14	
12	Russia	2	1	2	3	1	1	6	2	10
13	Denmark	11	7	9	6	9	8	14	13	
14	Albania	9	14	11	5	10	9	3	4	7
15	Romania	8	8	3	7	13	6	2	3	8
16	Georgia	14	11	7	16	15	15	7	12	

Detailed voting results from France (Final)
R/O	Country	B. Berberes	M. Gonet	É. Jean-Jean	Yseult	M. Myriam	Jury Rank	Televote Rank	Combined Rank	Points
01	Slovenia	13	22	23	22	15	22	24	26	
02	France									
03	Israel	23	26	25	23	19	25	5	16	
04	Estonia	12	20	11	25	21	19	15	20	
05	United Kingdom	20	18	14	24	7	17	25	25	
06	Armenia	10	14	22	26	18	20	2	8	3
07	Lithuania	14	12	26	1	20	14	20	21	
08	Serbia	24	21	24	21	26	26	8	18	
09	Norway	4	8	3	19	5	7	21	13	
10	Sweden	2	3	2	20	3	3	9	3	8
11	Cyprus	6	2	1	18	6	4	23	11	
12	Australia	7	10	5	17	1	8	14	9	2
13	Belgium	1	6	7	4	2	2	3	1	12
14	Austria	15	16	9	16	9	12	26	24	
15	Greece	16	17	18	15	12	16	22	23	
16	Montenegro	17	13	16	2	14	11	18	14	
17	Germany	11	9	15	14	10	10	19	15	
18	Poland	18	1	8	13	16	9	10	7	4
19	Latvia	3	5	4	3	4	1	12	4	7
20	Romania	22	23	21	12	24	24	4	12	
21	Spain	19	11	12	11	13	13	6	6	5
22	Hungary	8	7	6	5	11	6	16	10	1
23	Georgia	25	15	13	10	23	18	13	17	
24	Azerbaijan	21	19	20	9	22	21	17	22	
25	Russia	5	4	10	7	8	5	7	2	10
26	Albania	26	25	19	6	25	23	11	19	
27	Italy	9	24	17	8	17	15	1	5	6
