= France in the Eurovision Song Contest 2014 =

- Eurovision Song Contest 2014
- Participating broadcaster: France Télévisions
- Country: France
- Selection process: National final
- Selection date: 2 March 2014

Competing entry
- Song: "Moustache"
- Artist: Twin Twin
- Songwriters: Pierre Beyres; Kim N'Guyen; Lorent Idir; François Ardouvin

Placement
- Final result: 26th, 2 points

Participation chronology

France was represented at the Eurovision Song Contest 2014 with the song "Moustache" written by Pierre Beyres, Kim N'Guyen, Lorent Idir and François Ardouvin, and performed by the band Twin Twin. The French broadcaster France Télévisions in collaboration with the television channel France 3 organised a national final in order to select the French entry for the 2014 contest in Copenhagen, Denmark. Three songs competed in the national final which took place during the France 3 programme Les chansons d'abord. On 2 March 2014, "Moustache" performed by Twin Twin was officially announced by France 3 as the winner following the combination of votes from a jury panel and a public vote.

As a member of the "Big Five", France automatically qualified to compete in the final of the Eurovision Song Contest. Performing in position 14, France placed twenty-sixth (last) out of the 26 participating countries with 2 points. This marked the first time that the nation had placed last in the history of the competition.

== Background ==
Prior to the 2014 contest, France had participated in the Eurovision Song Contest fifty-six times since its debut as one of seven countries to take part in 1956. France first won the contest in 1958 with "Dors, mon amour" performed by André Claveau. In the 1960s, they won three times, with "Tom Pillibi" performed by Jacqueline Boyer in 1960, "Un premier amour" performed by Isabelle Aubret in 1962 and "Un jour, un enfant" performed by Frida Boccara, who won in 1969 in a four-way tie with the Netherlands, Spain and the United Kingdom. France's fifth victory came in 1977, when Marie Myriam won with the song "L'oiseau et l'enfant". France have also finished second four times, with Paule Desjardins in 1957, Catherine Ferry in 1976, Joëlle Ursull in 1990 and Amina in 1991, who lost out to Sweden's Carola in a tie-break. In the 21st century, France has had less success, only making the top ten three times, with Natasha St-Pier finishing fourth in 2001, Sandrine François finishing fifth in 2002 and Patricia Kaas finishing eighth in 2009. In 2013, the nation finished in twenty-third place with the song "L'enfer et moi" performed by Amandine Bourgeois.

The French national broadcaster, France Télévisions, broadcasts the event within France and delegates the selection of the nation's entry to the television channel France 3. France 3 confirmed that France would participate in the 2014 Eurovision Song Contest on 27 September 2013. The French broadcaster had used both national finals and internal selection to choose the French entry in the past. From 2008 to 2013, the broadcaster opted to internally select the French entry. In November 2013, the broadcaster announced that the 2014 French entry would be selected via a national final that would feature three competing acts. This marked the first time since 2007 that a national final would be organised to select the French entry.

== Before Eurovision ==
=== National final ===
Three entries participated in the French national final that selected France's entry for the Eurovision Song Contest 2014. The competition took place on 26 January 2014 and the winner was announced on 2 March 2014.

==== Competing entries ====
France 3 opened a submission period on 4 October 2013 in order for interested artists and songwriters to submit their proposals up until the deadline on 24 November 2013. Performers over 16 years of age were eligible for consideration, while songs were required to contain a majority of French language lyrics with a free language allowance for the remaining lyrics, and should not be instrumental pieces that extensively lacked vocals. A fourteen-member selection committee consisting of representatives of France Télévisions, music industry professionals, a Eurovision fan and a television viewer, the latter being selected from a public competition organised by France 3 in collaboration with France Bleu, shortlisted five entries on 26 November 2013 following a blind audio listening of the received submissions before finalising their decision of the three entries to compete in the national final. For the public competition, applicants were required to successfully answer three questions related to the Eurovision Song Contest in order to enter a draw. The members of the selection committee were:

- Laurent Bentata – General director of Stage Entertainment France
- Bruno Berberes – Casting and artistic director
- Laura Cès – Singer and comedian
- Mary De Vivo – Director of Le Réservoir
- Valérie Michelin – Music manager
- Franck Saurat – Television and entertainment producer
- Thierry Langlois – France 3 programme director
- Yann Chapellon – France Télévisions president and distribution director
- Marie Claire Mezerette – France 3 entertainment director
- Frédéric Valencak – Head of Delegation for France at the Eurovision Song Contest
- Olivier Daube – France Ô representative
- Dominique Bourron – France Bleu representative
- Farouk Vallette – OGAE France representative
- Morgane Buret – Public competition winner

The competing artists were announced on 27 November 2013. On 24 January 2014, 30-second clips of the competing songs were previewed during the Europe 1 radio programme Le grand direct des médias, hosted by Jean-Marc Morandini.

==== Final ====
The competing artists presented their entries to the public on 26 January 2014 during the France 3 programme Les chansons d'abord, hosted by Natasha St-Pier who represented France in the 2001 contest. The programme also featured guest appearances by former French Eurovision entrants Marie Myriam (1977), Amaury Vassili (2011) and Anggun (2012). Following the show, the entries were given increased exposure and rotation through recap programmes on France 3 and France Bleu, and the public was able to vote for their favourite song through online voting and televoting via telephone and SMS until 23 February 2014. The winner, "Moustache" performed by Twin Twin, was determined by the combination of a jury panel (50%), the results of the televote (25%) and the results of the online vote (25%), and was announced on 2 March 2014 during Les chansons d'abord.

R/O	Artist	Song	Songwriter(s)
1	Destan	"Sans toi"	Laura Marciano, Cheyenne
2	Joanna	"Ma liberté"	Gerard James Borg, Philip Vella, Sean Vella, Yves Guillon
3	Twin Twin	"Moustache"	Pierre Beyres, Kim N'Guyen, Lorent Idir, François Ardouvin

== At Eurovision ==
Twin Twin presenting themselves and "Moustache" at the Eurovision Song Contest 2014

According to Eurovision rules, all nations with the exceptions of the host country and the "Big Five" (France, Germany, Italy, Spain and the United Kingdom) are required to qualify from one of two semi-finals in order to compete for the final; the top ten countries from each semi-final progress to the final. As a member of the "Big 5", France automatically qualified to compete in the final on 10 May 2014. In addition to their participation in the final, France is also required to broadcast and vote in one of the two semi-finals. During the semi-final allocation draw on 20 January 2014, France was assigned to broadcast and vote in the first semi-final on 6 May 2014.

In France, the two semi-finals was broadcast on France Ô with commentary by Audrey Chauveau and Bruno Berberes, while the final was broadcast on France 3 with commentary by Cyril Féraud and Natasha St-Pier who represented France in the 2001 Contest. The French spokesperson, who announced the French votes during the final, was Elodie Suigo.

=== Final ===
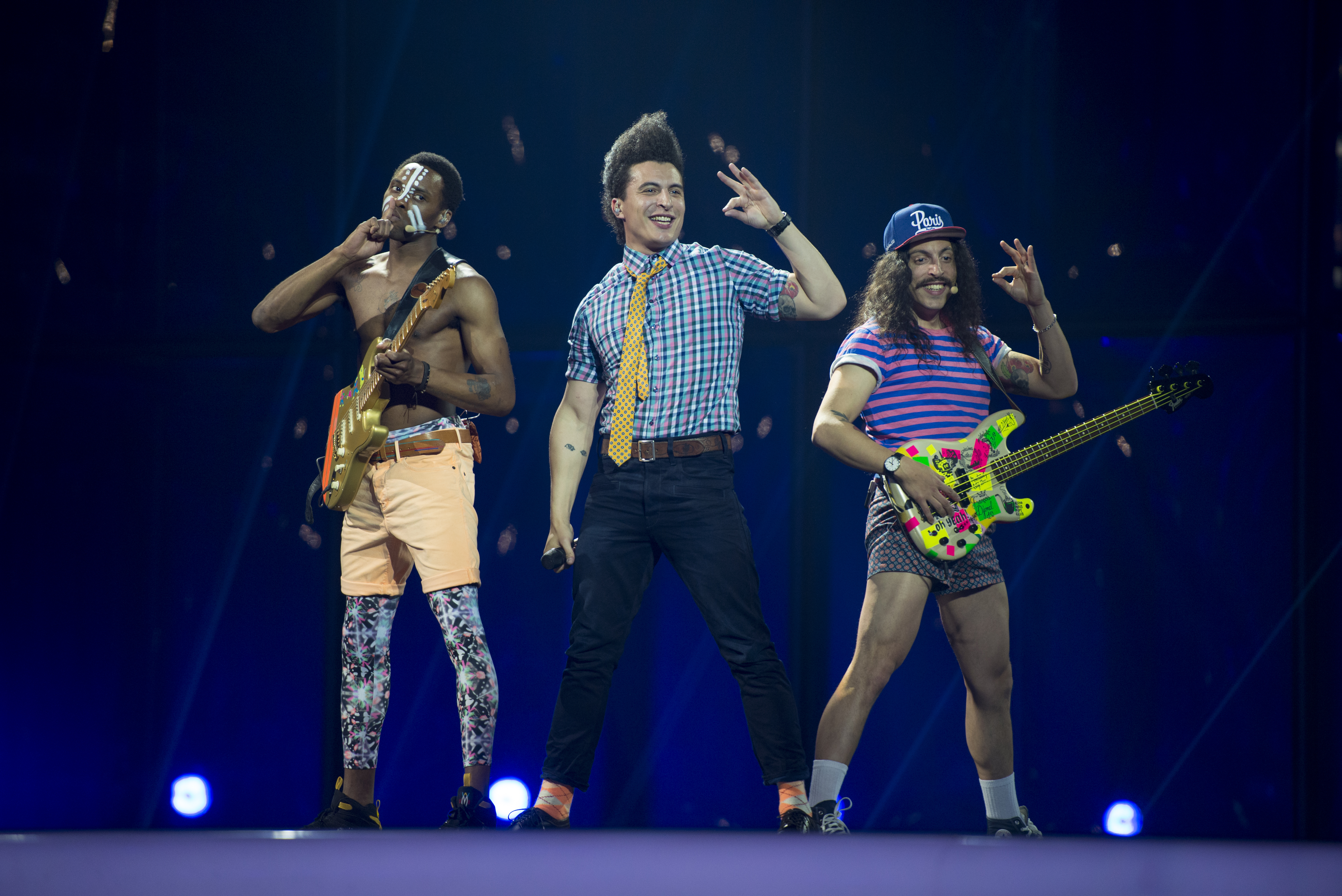
Twin Twin during a rehearsal before the final

Twin Twin took part in technical rehearsals on 4 and 6 May, followed by dress rehearsals on 9 and 10 May. This included the jury final on 9 May where the professional juries of each country watched and voted on the competing entries. After technical rehearsals were held on 6 May, the "Big 5" countries and host nation Denmark held a press conference. As part of this press conference, the artists took part in a draw to determine which half of the grand final they would subsequently participate in. France was drawn to compete in the second half. Following the conclusion of the second semi-final, the shows' producers decided upon the running order of the final. The running order for the semi-finals and final was decided by the shows' producers rather than through another draw, so that similar songs were not placed next to each other. France was subsequently placed to perform in position 14, following the entry from Sweden and before the entry from Russia.

The French performance featured the members of Twin Twin on stage dressed in colourful clothes and performing a choreographed routine with two dancers. The stage contained various colours and the LED screens displayed moustache motifs and images that beat together with the music beat. The dancers that joined Twin Twin on stage were Céline Baron and Jonathan Jenvrin. A backing vocalist, Ulrich Kwasi, was also part of the performance. France placed twenty-sixth (last) in the final, scoring 2 points. As of 2025, this remains the worst result France has ever achieved in the contest, and also the first time that it had finished last.

=== Voting ===
Voting during the three shows consisted of 50 percent public televoting and 50 percent from a jury deliberation. The jury consisted of five music industry professionals who were citizens of the country they represent, with their names published before the contest to ensure transparency. This jury was asked to judge each contestant based on: vocal capacity; the stage performance; the song's composition and originality; and the overall impression by the act. In addition, no member of a national jury could be related in any way to any of the competing acts in such a way that they cannot vote impartially and independently. The individual rankings of each jury member were released shortly after the grand final.

Following the release of the full split voting by the EBU after the conclusion of the competition, it was revealed that France had placed twenty-sixth with the public televote and the jury vote. In the public vote, France scored 1 points and in the jury vote the nation scored 5 points.

Below is a breakdown of points awarded to France and awarded by France in the first semi-final and grand final of the contest, and the breakdown of the jury voting and televoting conducted during the two shows:

==== Points awarded to France ====
Points awarded to France (Final)
Score	Country
12 points	
10 points	
8 points	
7 points	
6 points	
5 points	
4 points	
3 points	
2 points	
1 point	Finland; Sweden

==== Points awarded by France ====
Points awarded by France (Semi-final 1)
Score	Country
12 points	Armenia
10 points	Netherlands
8 points	Iceland
7 points	Montenegro
6 points	Sweden
5 points	Portugal
4 points	Estonia
3 points	Hungary
2 points	Azerbaijan
1 point	Belgium

Points awarded by France (Final)
Score	Country
12 points	Armenia
10 points	Austria
8 points	Netherlands
7 points	Iceland
6 points	Spain
5 points	Poland
4 points	Sweden
3 points	Denmark
2 points	Norway
1 point	Italy

==== Detailed voting results ====
The following members comprised the French jury:

- Fabrice Marchal (jury chairperson) – producer
- Jean-Marc Sauvagnargues – writer, composer, drummer, represented France in the 2007 contest as member of Les Fatals Picards
- Fanny Llado – singer
- Julie Solia – singer, lyricist
- Boris Bergman – writer, lyricist of the 1973 and 1975 Monegasque contest entries "Un train qui part" and "Une chanson c'est une lettre", and the 2013 French contest entry "L'enfer et moi"

Detailed voting results from France (Semi-final 1)
R/O	Country	F. Marchal	J-M. Sauvagnargues	F. Llado	J. Solia	B. Bergman	Jury Rank	Televote Rank	Combined Rank	Points
01	Armenia	5	3	1	1	4	3	1	1	12
02	Latvia	11	7	7	5	5	6	15	14	
03	Estonia	3	6	5	6	6	4	12	7	4
04	Sweden	4	8	10	10	7	8	6	5	6
05	Iceland	2	2	2	2	2	2	8	3	8
06	Albania	12	5	6	7	8	7	13	11	
07	Russia	14	11	15	9	15	14	11	15	
08	Azerbaijan	6	4	4	4	9	5	14	9	2
09	Ukraine	13	10	9	15	10	11	10	13	
10	Belgium	15	16	16	16	16	16	4	10	1
11	Moldova	16	15	11	12	14	15	16	16	
12	San Marino	10	13	12	11	12	12	9	12	
13	Portugal	8	12	14	13	13	13	2	6	5
14	Netherlands	1	1	3	3	1	1	3	2	10
15	Montenegro	9	9	8	14	3	9	5	4	7
16	Hungary	7	14	13	8	11	10	7	8	3

Detailed voting results from France (Final)
R/O	Country	F. Marchal	J-M. Sauvagnargues	F. Llado	J. Solia	B. Bergman	Jury Rank	Televote Rank	Combined Rank	Points
01	Ukraine	22	22	23	22	19	24	8	19	
02	Belarus	14	23	18	23	20	20	24	25	
03	Azerbaijan	24	6	8	5	14	9	22	18	
04	Iceland	6	5	4	7	2	3	13	4	7
05	Norway	9	7	7	6	21	8	14	9	2
06	Romania	19	19	24	25	16	22	4	13	
07	Armenia	5	4	2	1	7	1	1	1	12
08	Montenegro	13	13	13	15	5	11	21	20	
09	Poland	23	15	11	12	6	15	3	6	5
10	Greece	10	25	20	20	8	19	12	17	
11	Austria	2	3	1	2	17	4	2	2	10
12	Germany	21	24	21	17	23	23	19	22	
13	Sweden	4	14	12	14	18	13	6	7	4
14	France									
15	Russia	25	11	25	24	24	25	15	21	
16	Italy	18	9	15	9	13	14	10	10	1
17	Slovenia	20	21	16	13	12	18	25	23	
18	Finland	7	12	10	10	10	7	18	12	
19	Spain	17	16	9	8	9	10	7	5	6
20	Switzerland	12	17	19	16	11	16	9	11	
21	Hungary	8	20	17	19	15	17	11	15	
22	Malta	11	8	6	4	3	6	20	14	
23	Denmark	1	1	3	3	22	5	16	8	3
24	Netherlands	3	2	5	11	1	2	5	3	8
25	San Marino	15	18	22	21	25	21	23	24	
26	United Kingdom	16	10	14	18	4	12	17	16	
