= Lisa Angell =

French singer

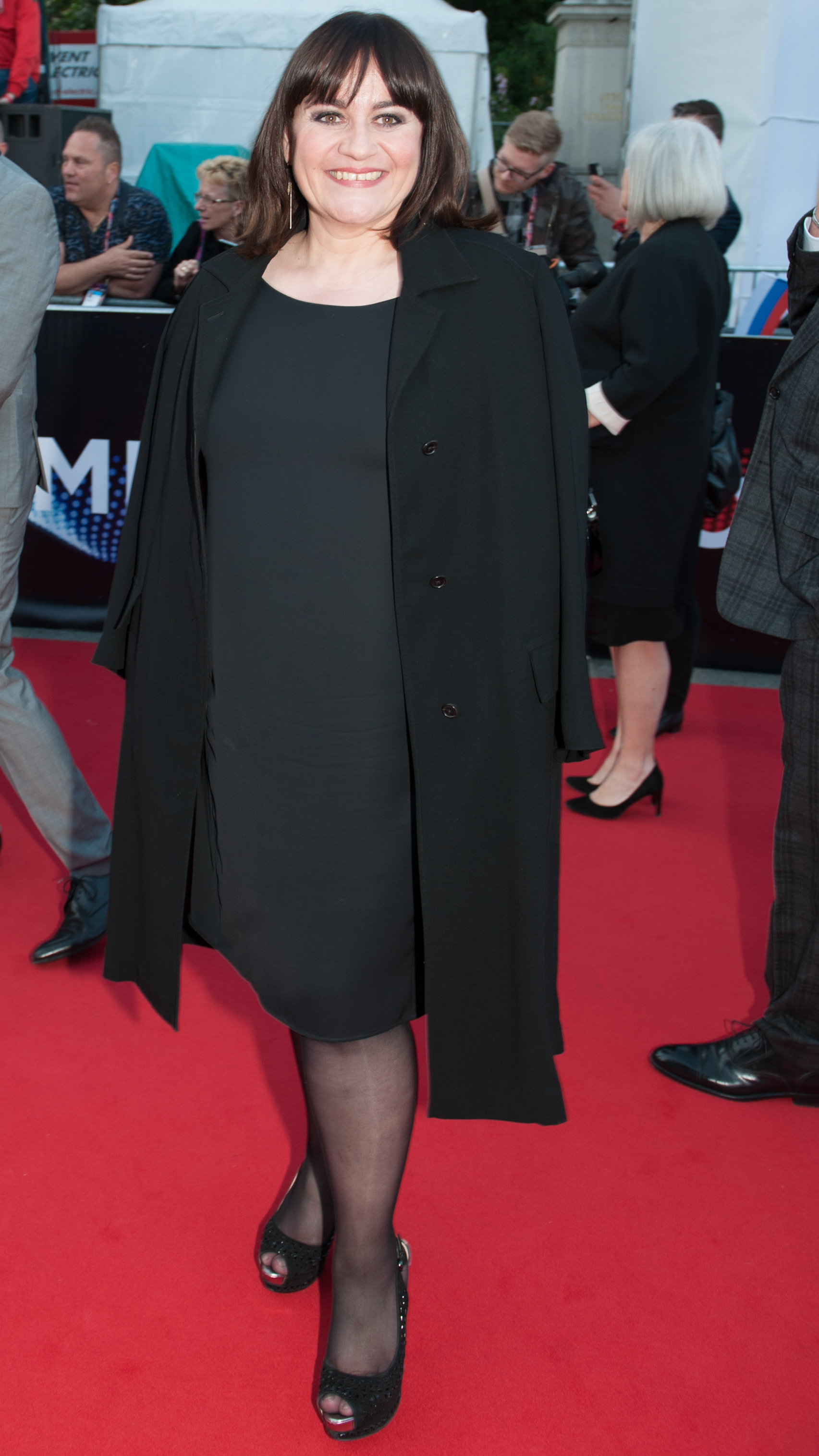
- Angell at the 2015 Eurovision Song Contest

Background information
- Born: Virginie Vetrano; 21 September 1968 (age 57); Paris, France
- Genres: Pop
- Occupation: Singer
- Instrument: Vocals
- Labels: Polydor / Universal

Lisa Angell (born Virginie Vetrano, 21 September 1968 in Paris) is a French singer who represented France in the Eurovision Song Contest 2015 with the song "N'oubliez pas".

== Career ==
=== Early beginnings ===
From the ages of 11 to 14, Angell competed in several radio talent shows during the Nice Carnvial. She was declared the winner for four consecutive years. At the age of 15, she began classical singing training at the Conservatory of Nice but she quit shortly after. However she continued singing by performing in piano bars in the Côte d'Azur. Angell settled in Paris in 2001 where she met Didier Barbelivien, the writer of her song "Des années après". The experience was not convincing and Angell went back to the Côte d'Azur.

=== 2009–11: Les Divines ===
In 2009, Dani Lary invited her to his show Le Château des secrets. This collaboration resulted in another song, this time with Patrick Sébastien in the studio of Le plus grand cabaret du monde. The latter proposed her to perform on Les années bonheur, and produced and wrote the songs of her first album Les Divines released in 2011 with Polydor. It peaked at number 31 in France and number 86 in Belgium.

=== 2013–14: Des mots... & Frou-Frou ===
Produced by Philippe Swan, her second album Des mots… was released in 2013. Preceding the album, the first single was "Je saurai t'aimer". It was a cover of Mélanie Cohl's song that is the French adaptation by Philippe Swan of "The Power of Love" by Jennifer Rush. Since September the same year, she has participated regularly in the weekly show Les chansons d'abord on France 3. For the album Nos fiançailles, France/Portugal by Tony Carreira, Angell accompanies him to make a duo singing "L'oiseau et l'enfant". Her third album Frou-Frou was released on 21 April 2014. This album of covers pays tribute to female performers of the 1930s, 1940s and 1950s.

=== 2015–present: Eurovision Song Contest ===
On 23 February 2015, Lisa Angell was announced to represent France in the Eurovision Song Contest 2015 in Vienna on 23 May 2015, with the song "N'oubliez pas".

== Discography ==
=== Albums ===
Title	Details	Peak chart positions
Title	Details	FRA
Les Divines	Released: 2011; Label: Polydor Records; Format: digital download, CD	31
Des mots...	Released: 2013; Label: Polydor Records; Format: digital download, CD	30
Frou-Frou	Released: 2014; Label: Polydor Records; Format: digital download, CD	28
Lisa Angell	Released: 2015; Label: Sony Music Entertainment; Format: digital download, CD	46

=== Singles ===
Title	Year	Peak chart positions	Album
Title	Year	FRA	Album
"Toi Valériane"	2010	—	Non-album singles
"Ma douceur"	2010	—	Non-album singles
"Je saurai t'aimer"	2013	—	Des mots...
"Ça me suffira"	2013	—	Des mots...
"J'ai deux amours"	2014	—	Frou-Frou
"N'oubliez pas"	2015	74	Lisa Angell
"—" denotes a single that did not chart or was not released.

== See also ==
- France in the Eurovision Song Contest 2015

Awards and achievements
Preceded by Twin Twin with "Moustache"	France in the Eurovision Song Contest; 2015	Succeeded by Amir with "J'ai cherché"
