= France in the Eurovision Song Contest 2003 =

- Eurovision Song Contest 2003
- Participating broadcaster: France Télévisions
- Country: France
- Selection process: Internal selection
- Announcement date: 7 March 2003

Competing entry
- Song: "Monts et merveilles"
- Artist: Louisa Baïleche
- Songwriter: Hocine Hallaf

Placement
- Final result: 18th, 19 points

Participation chronology

France was represented at the Eurovision Song Contest 2003 with the song "Monts et merveilles", written by Hocine Hallaf, and performed by Louisa Baïleche. The French participating broadcaster France Télévisions internally selected its entry for the contest. "Monts et merveilles" was officially presented to the public on 7 March 2003 during the France 3 programme Le Fabuleux Destin de....

As a member of the "Big Four", France automatically qualified to compete in the Eurovision Song Contest. Performing in position 19, France placed eighteenth out of the 26 participating countries with 19 points.

== Background ==
Prior to the 2003 contest, France Télévisions and its predecessor national broadcasters, have participated in the Eurovision Song Contest representing France forty-five times since RTF's debut in the inaugural contest. They first won the contest in 1958 with "Dors, mon amour" performed by André Claveau. In the 1960s, they won three times, with "Tom Pillibi" performed by Jacqueline Boyer in 1960, "Un premier amour" performed by Isabelle Aubret in 1962, and "Un jour, un enfant" performed by Frida Boccara, who won in 1969 in a four-way tie with the Netherlands, Spain, and the United Kingdom. Their fifth – and so far latest – victory came in 1977 with "L'oiseau et l'enfant" performed by Marie Myriam. France has also finished second four times, with Paule Desjardins in 1957, Catherine Ferry in 1976, Joëlle Ursull in 1990, and Amina in 1991 (who lost out to Sweden's Carola in a tie-break). In the 21st century, they make the top ten two times, with "Je n'ai que mon âme" performed by Natasha St-Pier finishing fourth in 2001 and "Il faut du temps" by Sandrine François finishing fifth in 2002.

As part of its duties as participating broadcaster, France Télévisions organises the selection of its entry in the Eurovision Song Contest and broadcasts the event in the country through France 3. The French broadcasters had used both national finals and internal selection to choose their entries in the past. Their 1999 and 2000 entries were selected via a national final that featured several competing acts. In 2001 and 2002, the broadcaster opted to internally select the entry, a procedure that was continued in order to select the 2003 entry.

== Before Eurovision ==
=== Internal selection ===
France Télévisions announced in early 2003 that its entry for the Eurovision Song Contest 2003 would be selected internally. On 13 January 2003, the broadcaster opened a submission period in order for interested artists and songwriters to submit their proposals. On 7 March 2003, the broadcaster announced during the France 3 programme Le Fabuleux Destin de..., hosted by Isabelle Giordano, that the French entry for the Eurovision Song Contest 2003 would be ""Monts et merveilles" performed by Louisa Baïleche. The song was written by Hocine Hallaf. The selection committee of France Télévisions considered two entries, ""Monts et merveilles" performed by Louisa Baïleche and "Un jour, je t'emmènerai" performed by Thibault Durand, before finalising their decision internally on 28 February 2003.

== At Eurovision ==
As a member of the "Big 4", France automatically qualified to compete in the Eurovision Song Contest 2003 on 24 May 2003. During the running order draw on 29 November 2003, France was placed to perform in position 19, following the entry from Norway and before the entry from Poland. France placed eighteenth in the final, scoring 19 points.

In France, the show was broadcast on France 3 with commentary by Laurent Ruquier and Isabelle Mergault, as well as via radio on France Bleu with commentary by Laurent Boyer.

=== Voting ===
Below is a breakdown of points awarded to France and awarded by France in the contest. France Télévisions appointed Sandrine François, who represented France in 2002, as its spokesperson to announce the French votes during the show.

Points awarded to France
Score	Country
12 points	
10 points	
8 points	Bosnia and Herzegovina
7 points	
6 points	Romania
5 points	
4 points	
3 points	Poland
2 points	Portugal
1 point	

Points awarded by France
Score	Country
12 points	Belgium
10 points	Turkey
8 points	Israel
7 points	Russia
6 points	Portugal
5 points	Poland
4 points	Romania
3 points	Norway
2 points	Sweden
1 point	Iceland
