= France in the Eurovision Song Contest =

- Eurovision Song Contest
- Participating broadcaster: France Télévisions (2001–present) Formerly: Radiodiffusion-Télévision Française (RTF; 1956–1964); Office de Radiodiffusion Télévision Française (ORTF; 1965–1974); Télévision Française 1 (TF1; 1975–1981); Antenne 2 (1983–1992); France Télévision (1993–2000)

Participation summary
- Appearances: 68
- First appearance: 1956
- Highest placement: 1st: 1958, 1960, 1962, 1969, 1977
- Host: 1959, 1961, 1978
- Participation history: 1956; 1957; 1958; 1959; 1960; 1961; 1962; 1963; 1964; 1965; 1966; 1967; 1968; 1969; 1970; 1971; 1972; 1973; ~~1974~~; 1975; 1976; 1977; 1978; 1979; 1980; 1981; 1982; 1983; 1984; 1985; 1986; 1987; 1988; 1989; 1990; 1991; 1992; 1993; 1994; 1995; 1996; 1997; 1998; 1999; 2000; 2001; 2002; 2003; 2004; 2005; 2006; 2007; 2008; 2009; 2010; 2011; 2012; 2013; 2014; 2015; 2016; 2017; 2018; 2019; ~~2020~~; 2021; 2022; 2023; 2024; 2025; 2026

External links
- France 2 page
- France's page at Eurovision.com
- For the most recent participation see France in the Eurovision Song Contest 2026

France has been represented at the Eurovision Song Contest 68 times since its debut at the first contest in 1956. France is one of only seven countries to be present at the first contest, and has been absent from only two contests in its history, missing the 1974 and 1982 contests. Since 2001, the French participating broadcaster is France Télévisions. Along with Germany, Italy, Spain, and the United Kingdom, France is one of the "Big Five" countries that are automatically prequalified for the final, due to their participating broadcasters being the largest financial contributors to the European Broadcasting Union (EBU). France has won the contest five times.

France first won the contest in 1958 with "Dors, mon amour" performed by André Claveau. Three more victories followed in the 1960s, with "Tom Pillibi" performed by Jacqueline Boyer in 1960, "Un premier amour" performed by Isabelle Aubret in 1962 and "Un jour, un enfant" performed by Frida Boccara, who won in 1969 in a four-way tie with the Netherlands, Spain, and the United Kingdom. France's fifth victory came in 1977, with the song "L'Oiseau et l'Enfant" performed by Marie Myriam. During its successful run in the 20th century, France has also finished second four times, with "La Belle amour" by Paule Desjardins (1957), "Un, deux, trois" by Catherine Ferry (1976), "White and Black Blues" by Joëlle Ursull (1990), and "C'est le dernier qui a parlé qui a raison" by Amina (1991), who lost out to Sweden's "Fångad av en stormvind" by Carola in a tie-break.

After reaching the top five in 23 contests in the 20th century, France has had less success in the 21st century, only making the top five four times, with "Je n'ai que mon âme" by Natasha St-Pier (fourth in 2001), "Il faut du temps" by Sandrine François (fifth in 2002), "Voilà" by Barbara Pravi (second in 2021), and "Mon amour" by Slimane (fourth in 2024). France's other top 10 results in the century are "Et s'il fallait le faire" by Patricia Kaas (eighth in 2009), "J'ai cherché" by Amir (sixth in 2016), and "Maman" by Louane (seventh in 2025). France finished last for the first time in 2014, when "Moustache" by Twin Twin received only two points.

== Organisation ==
Several national broadcasters have successively participated in the contest representing France over the years: Radiodiffusion-Télévision Française (RTF; 1956–1964), Office de Radiodiffusion Télévision Française (ORTF; 1965–1974), Télévision Française 1 (TF1; 1975–1981), Antenne 2 (1983–1992), and France Télévision (1993–2000). Since 2001, France Télévisions is who participates representing France, with the final being broadcast on France 2 (1993–1998, 2015–present) and France 3 (1999–2014), and the semi-final which France votes in was broadcast on France 4 (2005–2010, 2016–2019), later France Ô (2011–2015) and since 2021, Culturebox. The semi-final in 2004 was not broadcast; viewers who were close enough to Monaco were able to watch that year's semi-final via TMC Monte-Carlo. Radio coverage has been provided, although not every year or since 2013, by France Inter from 1971 to 1998 and from 2001 to 2012, France Bleu (also in 1976). In 1982, RTL Radio transmitted the contest due to the country's absence that year.

Since 1999, France, along with Germany, Spain, and the United Kingdom, have automatically qualified for the Eurovision final regardless of their results in previous contests. The participating broadcasters from these countries earned this special status by being the four biggest financial contributors to the EBU, and subsequently became known as the "Big Four". Italy returned to the contest in 2011, resulting in the countries becoming members of a "Big Five".

The process to select the French entry in the contest has changed over the years, with either a national final or an internal selection (occasionally a combination of both formats) having been held.

== Contest history ==
France is one of the most successful countries in Eurovision, winning the contest five times, coming second five times and coming third seven times. However, France has only hosted the contest three times (1959, 1961, and 1978). France was ranked first in number of victories (either alone or tied with other countries) without interruptions from 1960 to 1993. Moreover, "C'est le dernier qui a parlé qui a raison" performed by Amina was close to victory in 1991, when it finished in joint first place with the same number of points as Sweden. Therefore, the 'countback' rule applied, but both countries had an equal number of twelve points (four lots), but the victory went to Sweden, when France had fewer 10-point scores. With the current rules in place, France would have won the competition, because they received points from more countries than Sweden. One year before, France was also close to winning with "White and Black Blues" by Joëlle Ursull. The song finished in joint-second place with Ireland's entry.

However, in recent years, the French results have been mixed. Since 1998, when the televoting was introduced, France has frequently ranked in the bottom 10 countries in the final, coming 15th (2004), 18th (2003), 19th (1999 and 2008), 22nd (2006, 2007, and 2012), 23rd (2000, 2005, and 2013), 24th (1998 and 2022), 25th (2015), and 26th (last place, for the first time in its Eurovision history, in 2014).

France has had some good results during the 21st century. In 2001, "Je n'ai que mon âme" performed by Canadian singer Natasha St-Pier came fourth, being the favourite to win the contest by fans and odds. This good result was carried into the 2002 contest, when "Il faut du temps" by Sandrine François came fifth and received the Marcel Bezençon international press award for the best entry of that year. The positive experience with Sébastien Tellier in 2008 created considerable interest among the French showbiz for the contest, which resulted in Eurovision being seen by the French media as a valuable advertising campaign. With these ambitions, Patricia Kaas represented France in the 2009 contest with "Et s'il fallait le faire", finishing in eighth place. Kaas received the Marcel Bezençon artistic award, which was voted on by previous winners and presented to the best artist. In the 2016 contest, Amir with his song "J'ai cherché" ended in sixth place and broke a 40-year record by scoring the most points in France's Eurovision history, by scoring 257 points in the final. That record would later be broken once again in 2021, as Barbara Pravi with her song "Voilà" finished in second place with 499 points, France's best result since 1991, only 25 points behind eventual winners Måneskin from Italy. Slimane finished in fourth place in 2024 with "Mon amour", followed by Louane finishing seventh in 2025 with "Maman".

=== Absences ===
Since its debut in 1956, France has only missed two contests, in 1974 and 1982. In 1974, after selecting a singer and song to represent the country at the contest, France withdrew after the French president Georges Pompidou died in the week of the contest. If it had participated, France would have been represented by Dani with the song "La Vie à vingt-cinq ans".

In November 1981, TF1 declined to enter the Eurovision Song Contest for 1982, with the head of entertainment, Pierre Bouteiller, saying, "The absence of talent and the mediocrity of the songs were where annoyance set in. Eurovision is a monument to inanity [sometimes translated as "drivel"]." Antenne 2 took over due to the public reaction to TF1's withdrawal, hosting a national final to select the French entry as well, from the 1983 contest.

== Participation overview ==
Table key
1	First place
2	Second place
3	Third place
◁	Last place
◇	Entry selected but did not compete
†	Upcoming event

Year	Artist	Song	Language	Final	Points	Semi	Points
1956	Mathé Altéry	"Le Temps perdu"	French	—N/a (Note: The 1956 contest had secret voting and, apart from the winner, no results were released.)	—N/a	No semi-finals	
1956	Dany Dauberson	"Il est là"	French	—N/a	—N/a	No semi-finals	
1957	Paule Desjardins	"La Belle Amour"	French	2	17	No semi-finals	
1958	André Claveau	"Dors mon amour"	French	1	27	No semi-finals	
1959	Jean Philippe	"Oui oui oui oui"	French	3	15	No semi-finals	
1960	Jacqueline Boyer	"Tom Pillibi"	French	1	32	No semi-finals	
1961	Jean-Paul Mauric	"Printemps (avril carillonne)"	French	4	13	No semi-finals	
1962	Isabelle Aubret	"Un premier amour"	French	1	26	No semi-finals	
1963	Alain Barrière	"Elle était si jolie"	French	5	25	No semi-finals	
1964	Rachel	"Le Chant de Mallory"	French	4	14	No semi-finals	
1965	Guy Mardel	"N'avoue jamais"	French	3	22	No semi-finals	
1966	Dominique Walter	"Chez nous"	French	16	1	No semi-finals	
1967	Noëlle Cordier	"Il doit faire beau là-bas"	French	3	20	No semi-finals	
1968	Isabelle Aubret	"La Source"	French	3	20	No semi-finals	
1969	Frida Boccara	"Un jour, un enfant"	French	1	18	No semi-finals	
1970	Guy Bonnet	"Marie-Blanche"	French	4	8	No semi-finals	
1971	Serge Lama	"Un jardin sur la terre"	French	10	82	No semi-finals	
1972	Betty Mars	"Comé-comédie"	French	11	81	No semi-finals	
1973	Martine Clémenceau	"Sans toi"	French	15	65	No semi-finals	
1974	Dani ◇	"La Vie à vingt-cinq ans" ◇	French ◇	Withdrawn		No semi-finals	
1975	Nicole	"Et bonjour à toi l'artiste"	French	4	91	No semi-finals	
1976	Catherine Ferry	"Un, deux, trois"	French	2	147	No semi-finals	
1977	Marie Myriam	"L'Oiseau et l'Enfant"	French	1	136	No semi-finals	
1978	Joël Prévost	"Il y aura toujours des violons"	French	3	119	No semi-finals	
1979	Anne-Marie David	"Je suis l'enfant soleil"	French	3	106	No semi-finals	
1980	Profil	"Hé, hé m'sieurs dames"	French	11	45	No semi-finals	
1981	Jean Gabilou	"Humanahum"	French	3	125	No semi-finals	
1983	Guy Bonnet	"Vivre"	French	8	56	No semi-finals	
1984	Annick Thoumazeau	"Autant d'amoureux que d'étoiles"	French	8	61	No semi-finals	
1985	Roger Bens	"Femme dans ses rêves aussi"	French	10	56	No semi-finals	
1986	Cocktail Chic	"Européennes"	French	17	13	No semi-finals	
1987	Christine Minier	"Les mots d'amour n'ont pas de dimanche"	French	14	44	No semi-finals	
1988	Gérard Lenorman	"Chanteur de charme"	French	10	64	No semi-finals	
1989	Nathalie Pâque	"J'ai volé la vie"	French	8	60	No semi-finals	
1990	Joëlle Ursull	"White and Black Blues"	French	2	132	No semi-finals	
1991	Amina	"C'est le dernier qui a parlé qui a raison"	French	2	146	No semi-finals	
1992	Kali	"Monté la riviè"	French, Antillean Creole	8	73	No semi-finals	
1993	Patrick Fiori	"Mama Corsica"	French, Corsican	4	121	Kvalifikacija za Millstreet	
1994	Nina Morato	"Je suis un vrai garçon"	French	7	74	No semi-finals	
1995	Nathalie Santamaria	"Il me donne rendez-vous"	French	4	94	No semi-finals	
1996	Dan Ar Braz and l'Héritage des Celtes	"Diwanit bugale"	Breton	19	18	11	55
1997	Fanny	"Sentiments songes"	French	7	95	No semi-finals	
1998	Marie Line	"Où aller"	French	24	3	No semi-finals	
1999	Nayah	"Je veux donner ma voix"	French	19	14	No semi-finals	
2000	Sofia Mestari	"On aura le ciel"	French	23	5	No semi-finals	
2001	Natasha St-Pier	"Je n'ai que mon âme"	French, English	4	142	No semi-finals	
2002	Sandrine François	"Il faut du temps"	French	5	104	No semi-finals	
2003	Louisa Baïleche	"Monts et merveilles"	French	18	19	No semi-finals	
2004	Jonatan Cerrada	"À chaque pas"	French, Spanish	15	40	Member of the "Big Four"	
2005	Ortal	"Chacun pense à soi"	French	23	11	Member of the "Big Four"	
2006	Virginie Pouchain	"Il était temps"	French	22	5	Member of the "Big Four"	
2007	Les Fatals Picards	"L'Amour à la française"	French, English ("Franglais")	22	19	Member of the "Big Four"	
2008	Sébastien Tellier	"Divine"	English, French	19	47	Member of the "Big Four"	
2009	Patricia Kaas	"Et s'il fallait le faire"	French	8	107	Member of the "Big Four"	
2010	Jessy Matador	"Allez Ola Olé"	French	12	82	Member of the "Big Four"	
2011	Amaury Vassili	"Sognu"	Corsican	15	82	Member of the "Big Five"	
2012	Anggun	"Echo (You and I)"	French, English	22	21	Member of the "Big Five"	
2013	Amandine Bourgeois	"L'Enfer et moi"	French	23	14	Member of the "Big Five"	
2014	Twin Twin	"Moustache"	French	26 ◁	2	Member of the "Big Five"	
2015	Lisa Angell	"N'oubliez pas"	French	25	4	Member of the "Big Five"	
2016	Amir	"J'ai cherché"	French, English	6	257	Member of the "Big Five"	
2017	Alma	"Requiem"	French, English	12	135	Member of the "Big Five"	
2018	Madame Monsieur	"Mercy"	French	13	173	Member of the "Big Five"	
2019	Bilal Hassani	"Roi"	French, English	16	105	Member of the "Big Five"	
2020	Tom Leeb ◇	"Mon alliée (The Best in Me)" ◇	French, English ◇	Contest cancelled (Note: The 2020 contest was cancelled due to the COVID-19 pandemic.)		Member of the "Big Five"	
2021	Barbara Pravi	"Voilà"	French	2	499	Member of the "Big Five"	
2022	Alvan and Ahez	"Fulenn"	Breton	24	17	Member of the "Big Five"	
2023	La Zarra	"Évidemment"	French	16	104	Member of the "Big Five"	
2024	Slimane	"Mon amour"	French	4	445	Member of the "Big Five"	
2025	Louane	"Maman"	French	7	230	Member of the "Big Five"	
2026	Monroe	"Regarde!"	French	11	158	Member of the "Big Four"	
2027	Confirmed intention to participate †						

== Hostings ==
Year	Location	Venue	Presenters
1959	Cannes	Palais des Festivals	Jacqueline Joubert
1961	Cannes	Palais des Festivals	Jacqueline Joubert
1978	Paris	Palais des Congrès	Denise Fabre and Léon Zitrone

== Awards ==
=== Marcel Bezençon Awards ===
Year	Category	Song	Composer(s) lyrics (l) / music (m)	Performer	Final	Points	Host city	Ref.
2002	Press Award	"Il faut du temps"	Rick Allison (m), Patrick Bruel (m&l), Marie-Florence Gros (l)	Sandrine François	5	104	(Estonia) Tallinn	
2009	Artistic Award (Note: Voted by previous winners.)	"Et s'il fallait le faire"	Anse Lazio (m&l), Fred Blondin (m&l)	Patricia Kaas	8	107	(Russia) Moscow	
2011	Composer Award	"Sognu"	Daniel Moyne (m), Quentin Bachelet (m), Jean-Pierre Marcellesi (l), Julie Miller (l)	Amaury Vassili	15	82	(Germany) Düsseldorf	
2018	Press Award	"Mercy"	Émilie Satt (m&l), Jean-Karl Lucas (m&l)	Madame Monsieur	13	173	(Portugal) Lisbon	
2021	Press Award; Artistic Award (Note: Voted by the national commentators.)	"Voilà"	Barbara Pravi (m&l), Lili Poe (l), Igit (m)	Barbara Pravi	2	499	(Netherlands) Rotterdam	
2025	Press Award; Artistic Award	"Maman"	Louane (m&l), Tristan Salvati (m)	Louane	7	230	(Switzerland) Basel	

=== Winner by OGAE members ===
Year	Song	Performer	Final	Points	Host city	Ref.
2016	"J'ai cherché"	Amir	6	257	(Sweden) Stockholm	

== Related involvement ==
=== Conductors ===
Year	Conductor (Note: All conductors are of French nationality unless otherwise noted.)	Musical Director	Notes	Ref.
1956	Franck Pourcel	N/A		
1957	Franck Pourcel	N/A		
1958	Franck Pourcel	N/A		
1959	Franck Pourcel		(Note: Also conducted for Austria, Germany, Monaco, Sweden, and Switzerland)	
1960	Franck Pourcel	N/A		
1961	Franck Pourcel		(Note: Also conducted for Austria and Germany)	
1962	Franck Pourcel	N/A		
1963	Franck Pourcel	N/A		
1964	Franck Pourcel	N/A		
1965	Franck Pourcel	N/A		
1966	Franck Pourcel	N/A		
1967	Franck Pourcel	N/A		
1968	Alain Goraguer	N/A		
1969	Franck Pourcel	N/A		
1970	Franck Pourcel	N/A		
1971	Franck Pourcel	N/A		
1972	Franck Pourcel	N/A		
1973	Jean Claudric	N/A		
1974	Jean-Claude Petit	N/A	(Note: Announced as the French conductor prior to the country's withdrawal)	
1975	Jean Musy	N/A		
1976	Tony Rallo	N/A		
1977	Raymond Donnez	N/A		
1978	Alain Goraguer	François Rauber		
1979	Guy Matteoni	N/A		
1980	(Italy) Sylvano Santorio	N/A	(Note: Conducted at the national final by François Rauber)	
1981	David Sprinfield	N/A		
1983	François Rauber	N/A		
1984	François Rauber	N/A		
1985	Michel Bernholc	N/A	(Note: Conducted at the national final by François Rauber.)	
1986	Jean-Claude Petit	N/A	(Note: Conducted at the national final by François Rauber.)	
1987	Jean-Claude Petit	N/A		
1988	Guy Matteoni	N/A		
1989	Guy Matteoni	N/A		
1990	Régis Dupré	N/A		
1991	Jérôme Pillement	N/A		
1992	Magdi Vasco Noverraz	N/A		
1993	Christian Cravero	N/A		
1994	Alain Goraguer	N/A		
1995	Michel Bernholc	N/A		
1996	(Republic of Ireland) Fiachra Trench	N/A		
1997	Régis Dupré	N/A		
1998	(United Kingdom) Martin Koch	N/A	Host conductor (Note: Koch conducted a small string arrangement added to the performance over the course of rehearsals; he did not take the traditional conductor's bow.)	
1999	No orchestra		(Note: Although the international final did not feature the orchestra, there was one for the national final, conducted by Rene Coll.)	
2000	No orchestra		(Note: Although the international final did not feature the orchestra, there was one for the national final, conducted by Rene Coll.)	

=== Heads of delegation ===
Year	Head of delegation	Ref.
2002–2012	Bruno Berberes	
2013–2015	Frederic Valencak	
2016–2018	Edoardo Grassi	
2019	Steven Clerima	
2020–present	Alexandra Redde-Amiel	

=== Commentators and spokespersons ===
Since its debut in 1956, French broadcasters has sent commentators to provide coverage on the contest, including Robert Beauvais and Léon Zitrone. During the 1960s, its commentators was relayed in Luxembourg, Monaco, and French-speaking Switzerland.

Year	Commentator		Spokesperson	Ref.
Year	Final	Semi-final	Spokesperson	Ref.
1956	Michelle Rebel	No semi-finals	No spokesperson	
1957	Robert Beauvais	No semi-finals	Claude Darget	
1958	Pierre Tchernia	No semi-finals	Armand Lanoux	
1959	Claude Darget	No semi-finals	Marianne Lecène	
1960	Pierre Tchernia	No semi-finals	Armand Lanoux	
1961	Robert Beauvais	No semi-finals	Armand Lanoux	
1962	Pierre Tchernia	No semi-finals	André Valmy	
1963	Pierre Tchernia	No semi-finals	Armand Lanoux	
1964	Robert Beauvais	No semi-finals	Jean-Claude Massoulier	
1965	Pierre Tchernia	No semi-finals	Jean-Claude Massoulier	
1966	François Deguelt	No semi-finals	Jean-Claude Massoulier	
1967	Pierre Tchernia	No semi-finals	Jean-Claude Massoulier	
1968	Pierre Tchernia	No semi-finals	Jean-Claude Massoulier	
1969	Pierre Tchernia	No semi-finals	Jean-Claude Massoulier	
1970	Pierre Tchernia	No semi-finals	Jean-Claude Massoulier	
1971	Georges de Caunes	No semi-finals	No spokesperson	
1972	Pierre Tchernia	No semi-finals	No spokesperson	
1973	Pierre Tchernia	No semi-finals	No spokesperson	
1974	Pierre Tchernia	No semi-finals	Did not participate	
1975	Georges de Caunes	No semi-finals	Marc Menant	
1976	Jean-Claude Massoulier	No semi-finals	Marc Menant	
1977	Georges de Caunes	No semi-finals	Marc Menant	
1978	Léon Zitrone	No semi-finals	Patrice Laffont	
1979	Marc Menant	No semi-finals	Fabienne Égal	
1980	Patrick Sabatier	No semi-finals	Fabienne Égal	
1981	Patrick Sabatier	No semi-finals	Denise Fabre	
1982	Andre Torrent	No semi-finals	Did not participate	
1983	Léon Zitrone	No semi-finals	Nicole André	
1984	Léon Zitrone	No semi-finals	Nicole André	
1985	Patrice Laffont	No semi-finals	Clémentine Célarié	
1986	Patrice Laffont	No semi-finals	Patricia Lesieur	
1987	Patrick Simpson-Jones	No semi-finals	Lionel Cassan	
1988	Lionel Cassan	No semi-finals	Catherine Ceylac	
1989	Lionel Cassan	No semi-finals	Marie-Ange Nardi	
1990	Richard Adaridi	No semi-finals	Valérie Maurice	
1991	Léon Zitrone	No semi-finals	Daniela Lumbroso	
1992	Thierry Beccaro	No semi-finals	Olivier Minne	
1993	Patrice Laffont	No semi-finals	Olivier Minne	
1994	Patrice Laffont	No semi-finals	Laurent Romejko	
1995	Olivier Minne	No semi-finals	Thierry Beccaro	
1996	Olivier Minne	No semi-finals	Laurent Broomhead	
1997	Olivier Minne	No semi-finals	Frédéric Ferrer and Marie Myriam	
1998	Chris Mayne, Laura Mayne	No semi-finals	Marie Myriam	
1999	Julien Lepers	No semi-finals	Marie Myriam	
2000	Julien Lepers	No semi-finals	Marie Myriam	
2001	Marc-Olivier Fogiel, Dave	No semi-finals	Corinne Hermès	
2002	Marc-Olivier Fogiel, Dave	No semi-finals	Marie Myriam	
2003	Laurent Ruquier, Isabelle Mergault	No semi-finals	Sandrine François	
2004	Laurent Ruquier, Elsa Fayer	No broadcast	Alex Taylor	
2005	Julien Lepers, Guy Carlier	Peggy Olmi	Marie Myriam	
2006	Michel Drucker, Claudy Siar	Peggy Olmi, Eric Jean-Jean	Sophie Jovillard	
2007	Julien Lepers, Tex	Peggy Olmi, Yann Renoard	Vanessa Dolmen	
2008	Julien Lepers, Jean-Paul Gaultier	Peggy Olmi, Yann Renoard	Cyril Hanouna	
2009	Cyril Hanouna, Julien Courbet	Peggy Olmi, Yann Renoard	Yann Renoard	
2010	Cyril Hanouna, Stéphane Bern	Peggy Olmi, Yann Renoard	Audrey Chauveau	
2011	Laurent Boyer, Catherine Lara	Audrey Chauveau, Bruno Berberes	Cyril Féraud	
2012	Cyril Féraud, Mireille Dumas	Audrey Chauveau, Bruno Berberes	Amaury Vassili	
2013	Cyril Féraud, Mireille Dumas	Audrey Chauveau, Bruno Berberes	Marine Vignes	
2014	Cyril Féraud, Natasha St-Pier	Audrey Chauveau, Bruno Berberes	Elodie Suigo	
2015	Stéphane Bern, Marianne James	Mareva Galanter, Jérémy Parayre	Virginie Guilhaume	
2016	Stéphane Bern, Marianne James	Marianne James, Jarry	Élodie Gossuin	
2017	Stéphane Bern, Marianne James, Amir	Marianne James, Jarry	Élodie Gossuin	
2018	Stéphane Bern, Christophe Willem, Alma	Christophe Willem, André Manoukian	Élodie Gossuin	
2019	Stéphane Bern, André Manoukian	Sandy Héribert, André Manoukian	Julia Molkhou	
2021	Stéphane Bern, Laurence Boccolini	Laurence Boccolini	Carla	
2022	Stéphane Bern, Laurence Boccolini	Laurence Boccolini	Élodie Gossuin	
2023	Stéphane Bern, Laurence Boccolini	Anggun, André Manoukian	Anggun	
2024	Stéphane Bern, Laurence Boccolini	Nicky Doll	Natasha St-Pier	
2025	Stéphane Bern, Laurence Boccolini	Stéphane Bern	Émilie Mazoyer	
2026	Stéphane Bern, Camille Cerf	Stéphane Bern	Magali Ripoll	

== Photo gallery ==
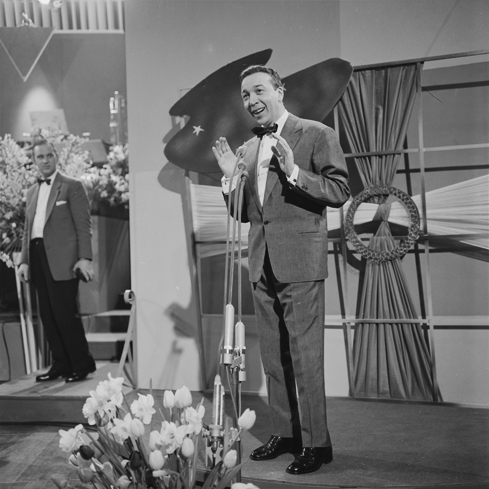
André Claveau in Hilversum (1958)

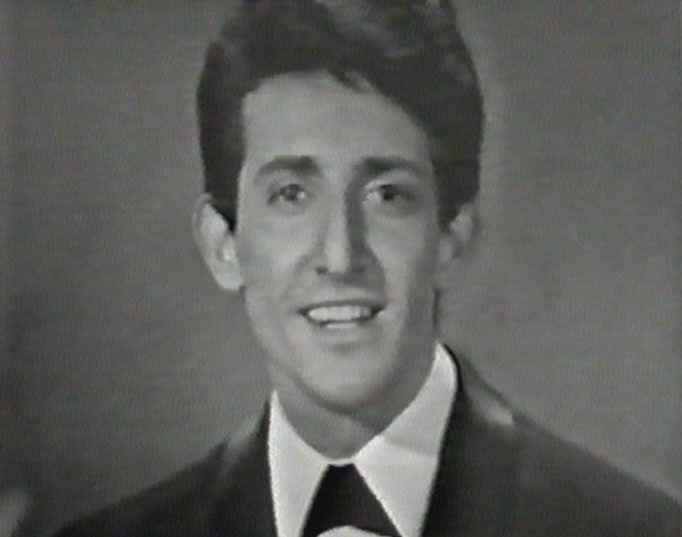
Guy Mardel in Naples (1965)

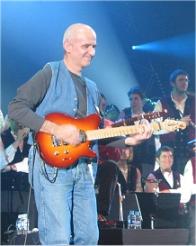
Dan Ar Braz in Oslo (1996)

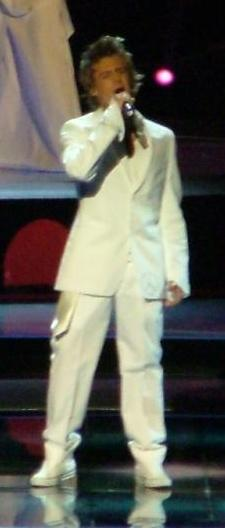
Jonatan Cerrada in Istanbul (2004)

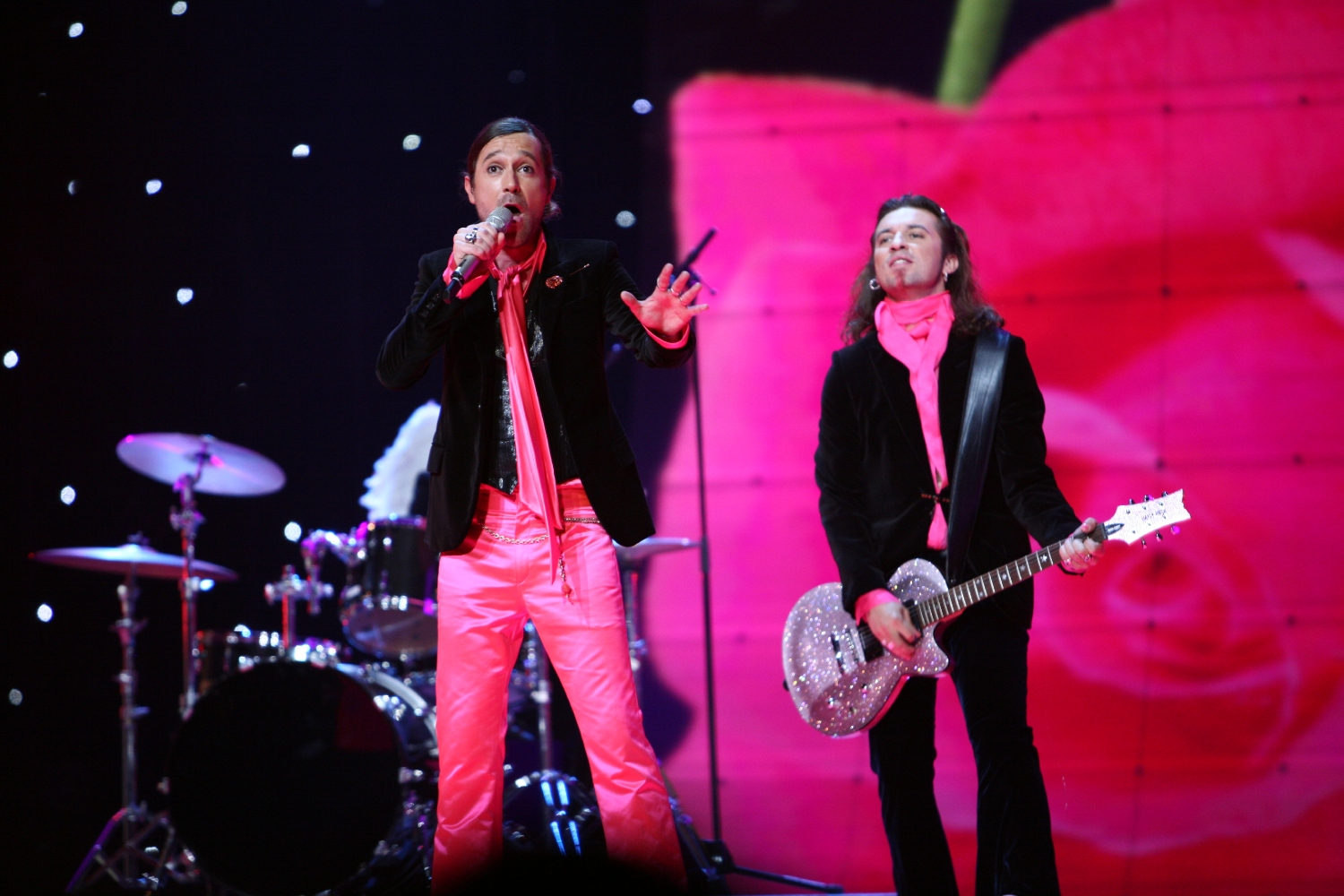
Les Fatals Picards in Helsinki (2007)

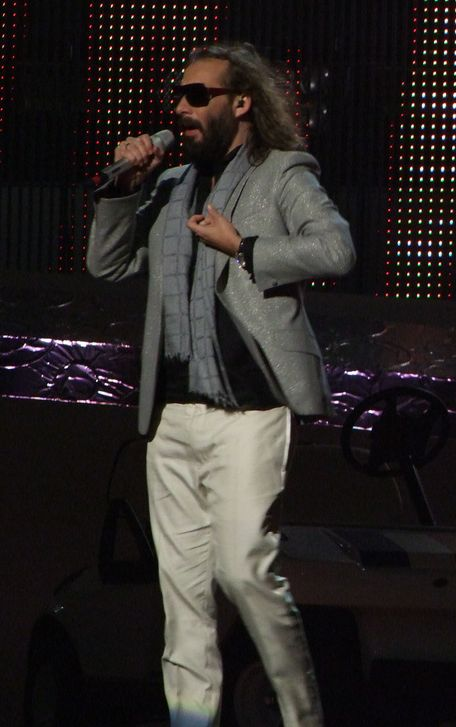
Sébastien Tellier in Belgrade (2008)

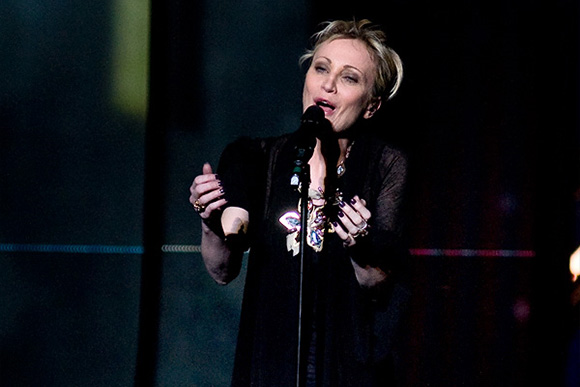
Patricia Kaas in Moscow (2009)

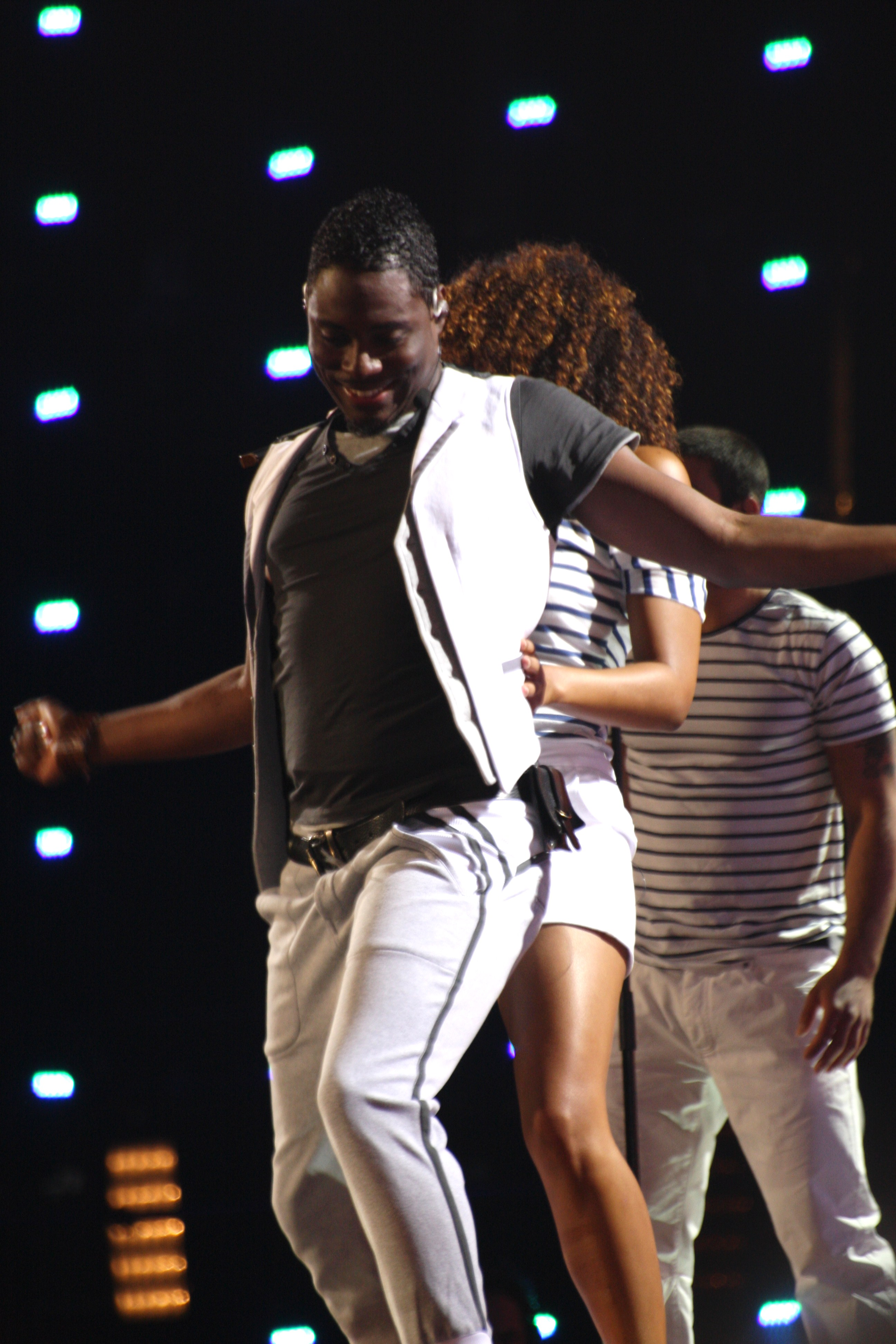
Jessy Matador in Oslo (2010)

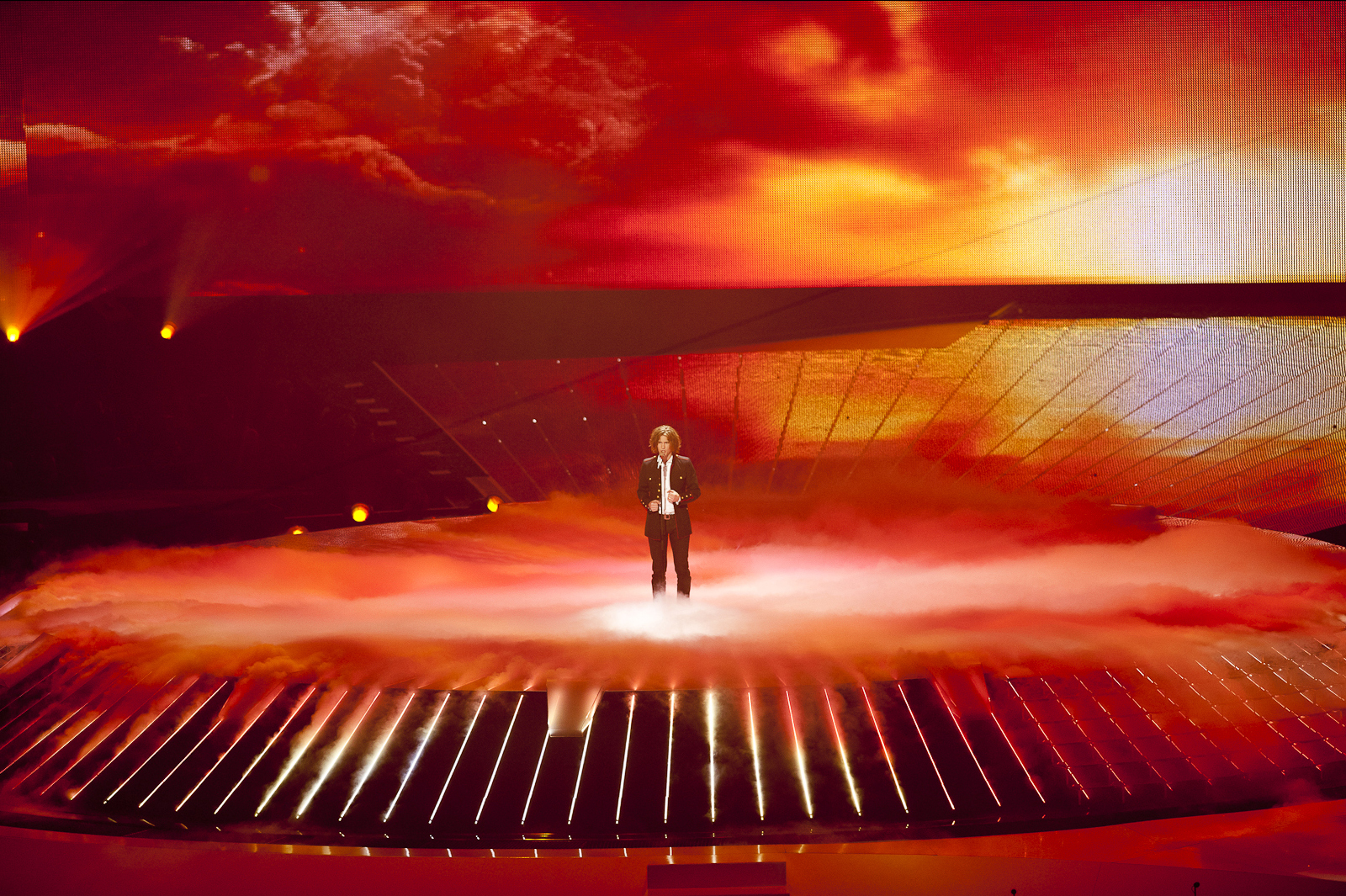
Amaury Vassili in Düsseldorf (2011)

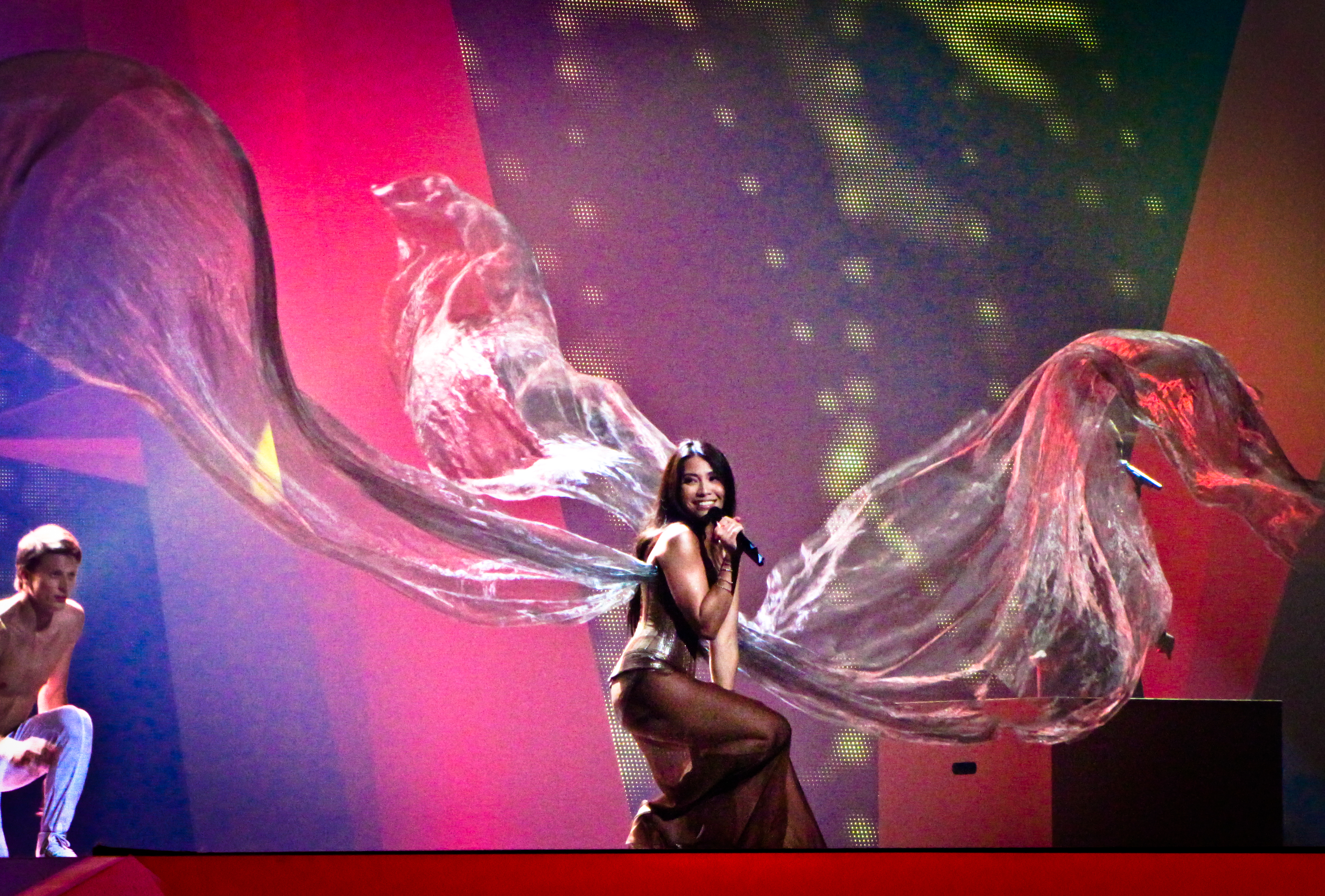
Anggun in Baku (2012)

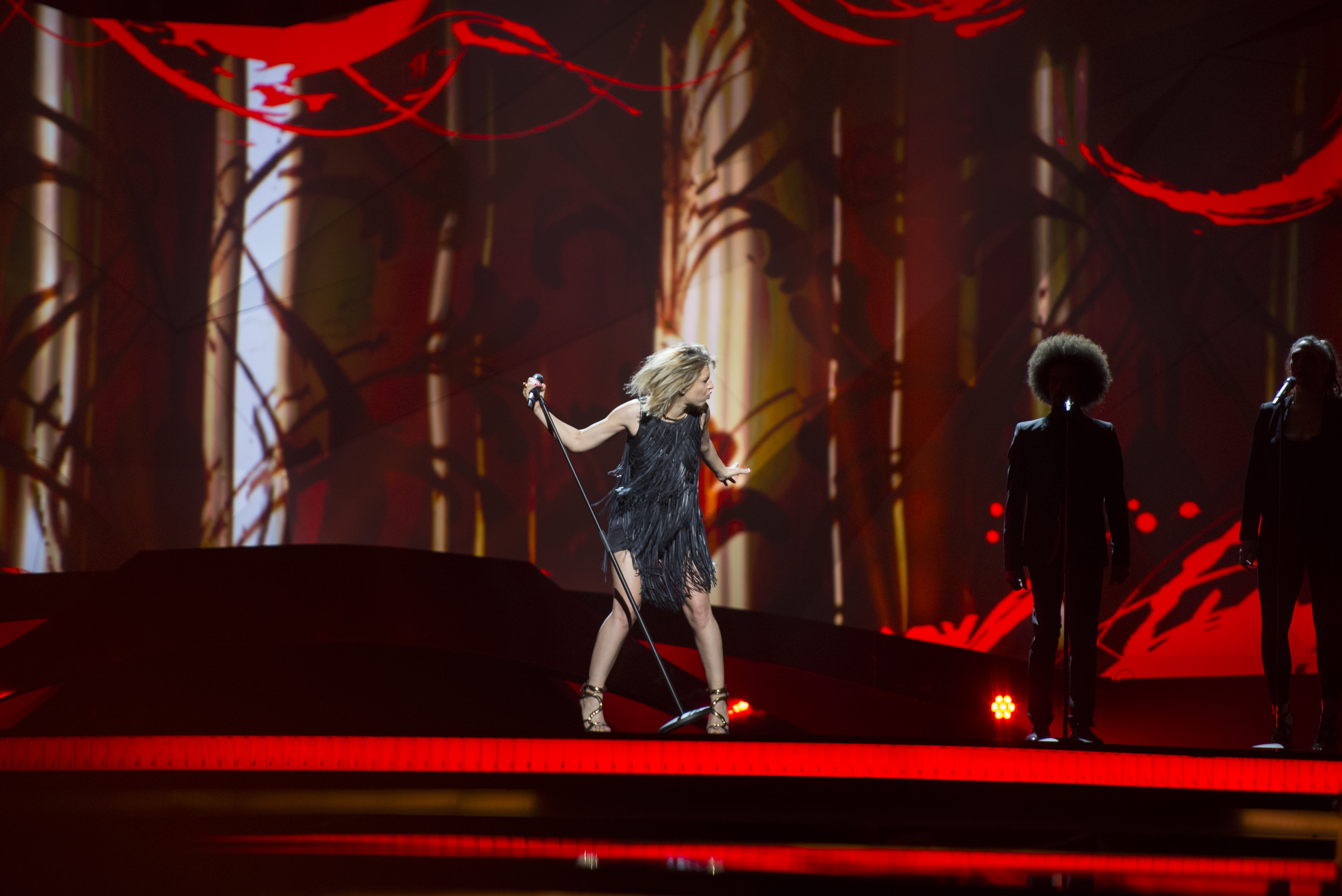
Amandine Bourgeois in Malmö (2013)

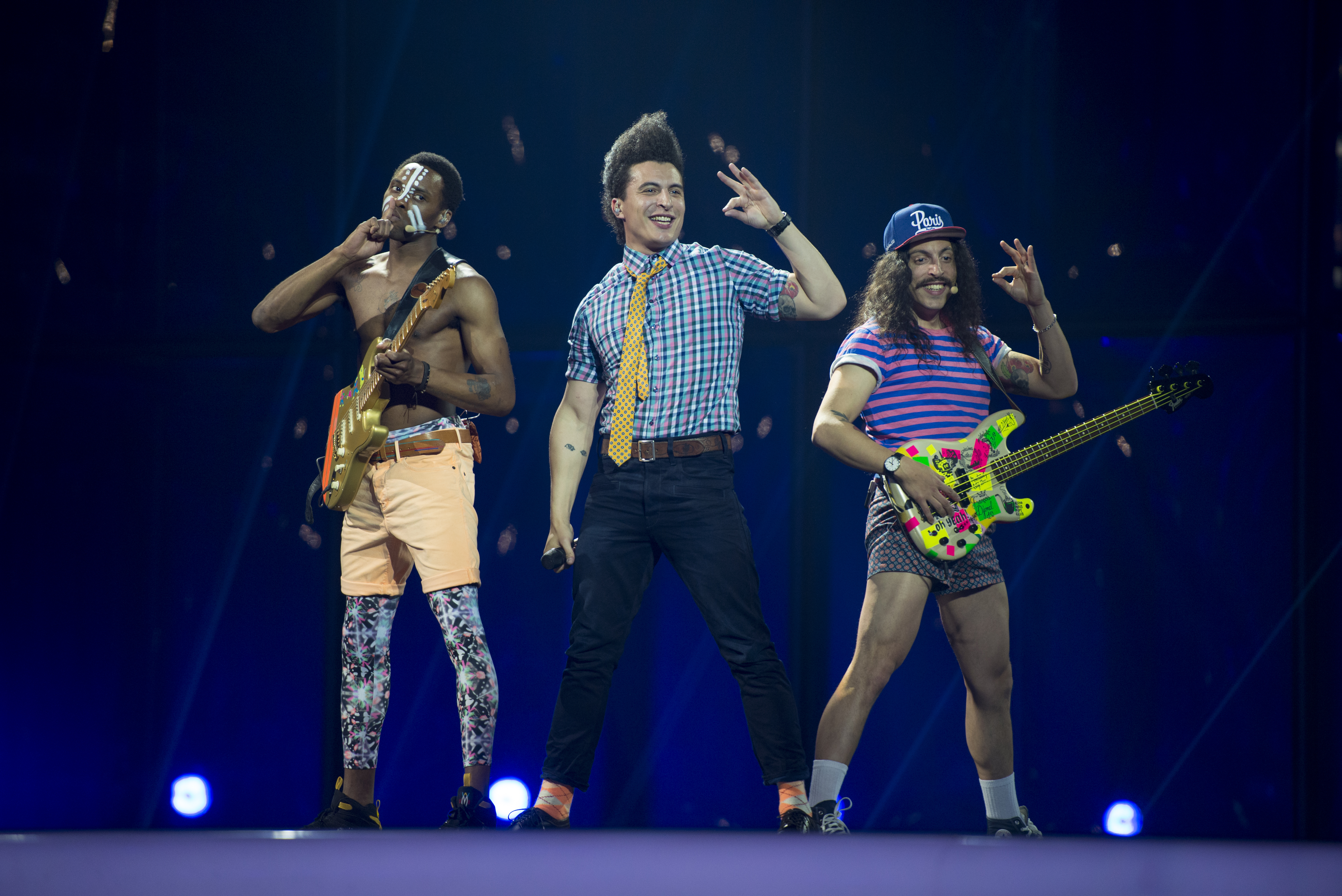
Twin Twin in Copenhagen (2014)

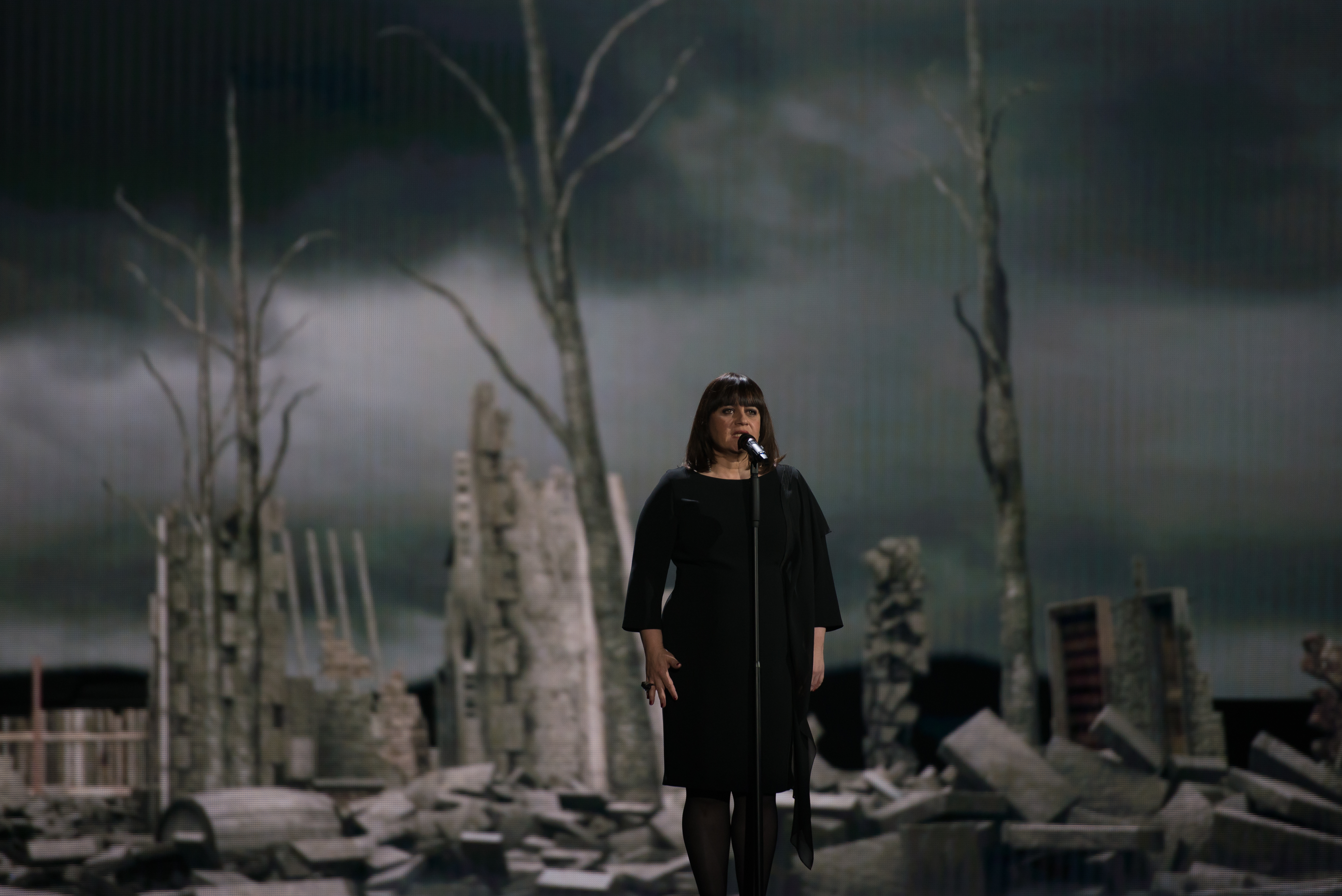
Lisa Angell in Vienna (2015)

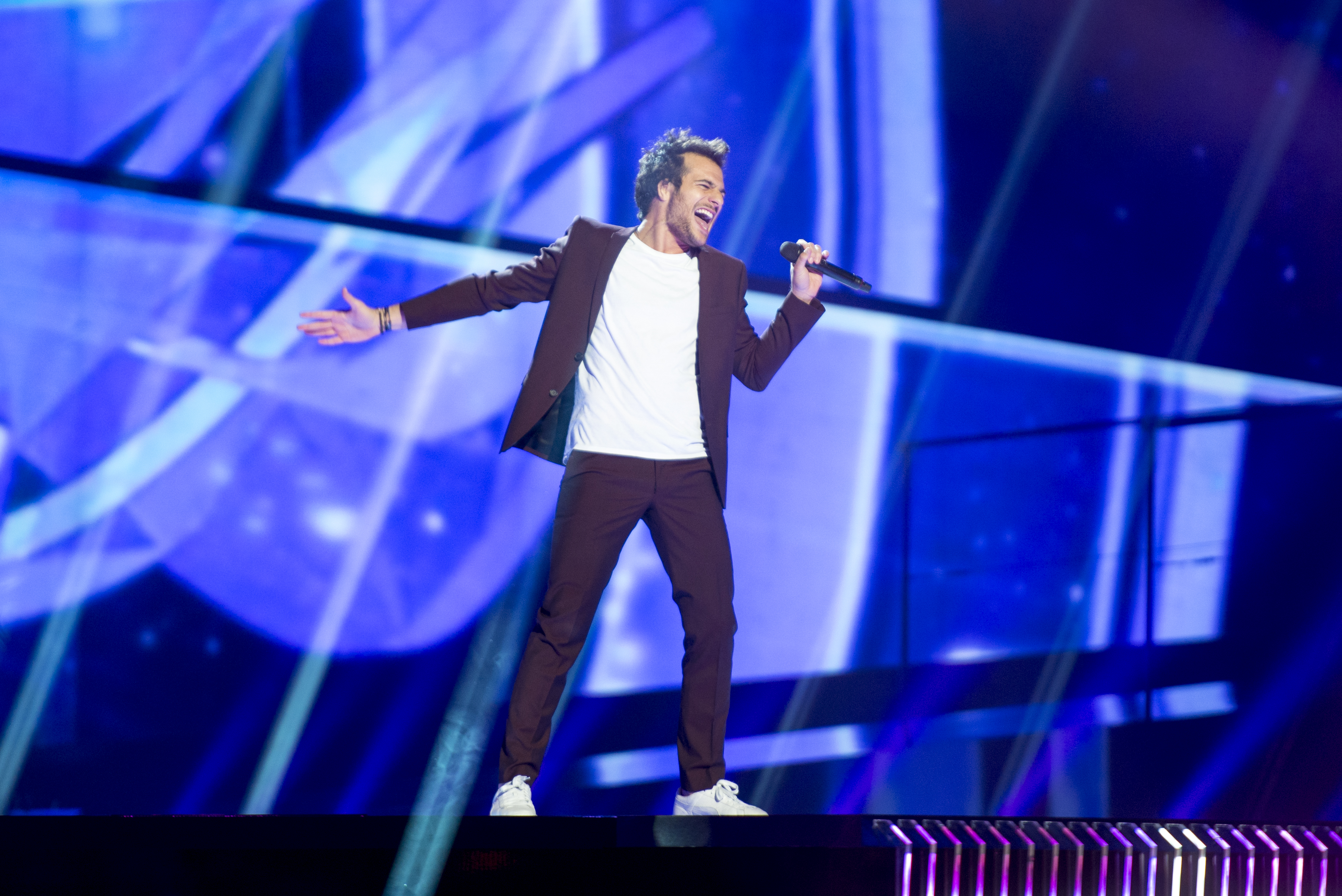
Amir in Stockholm (2016)

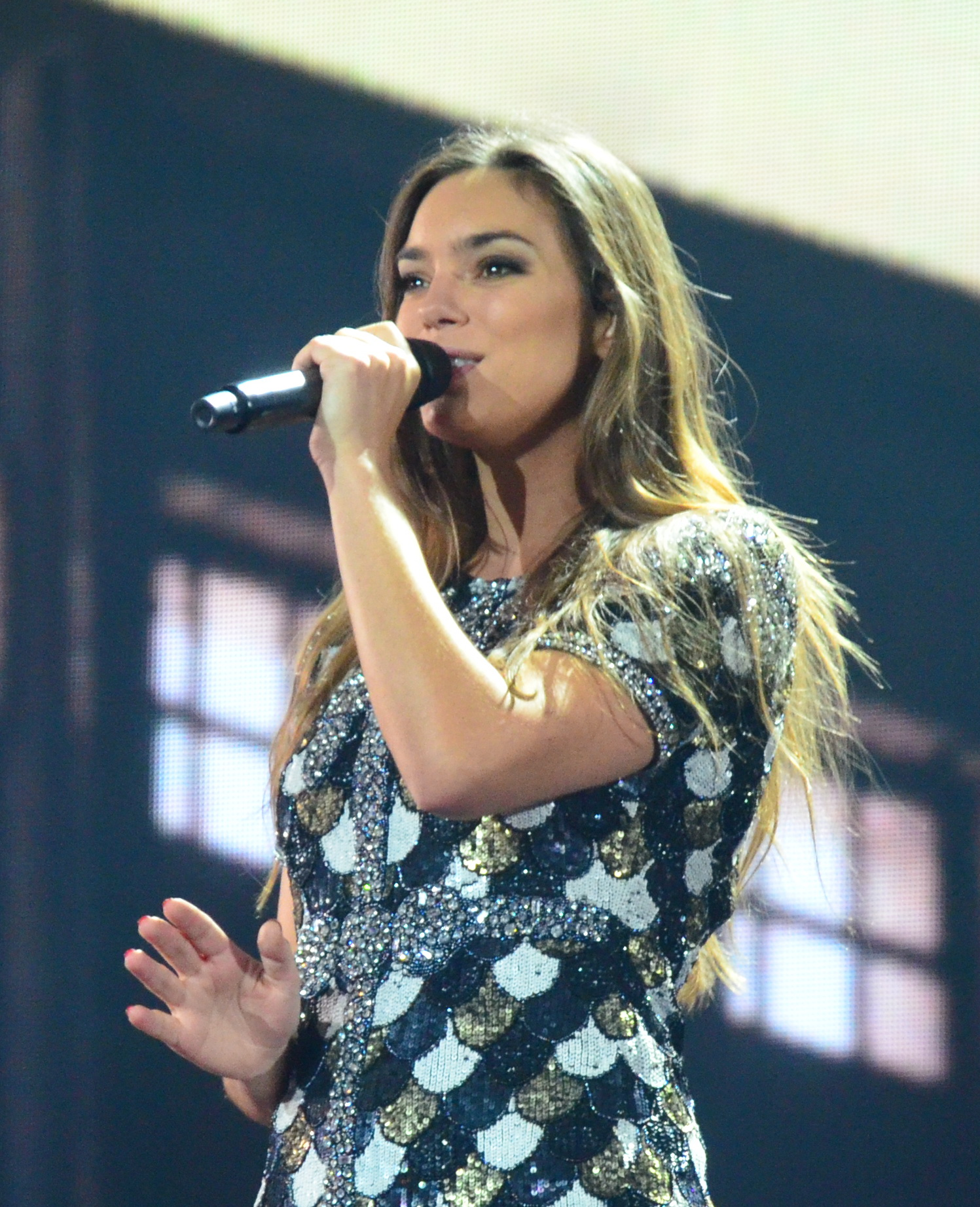
Alma in Kyiv (2017)

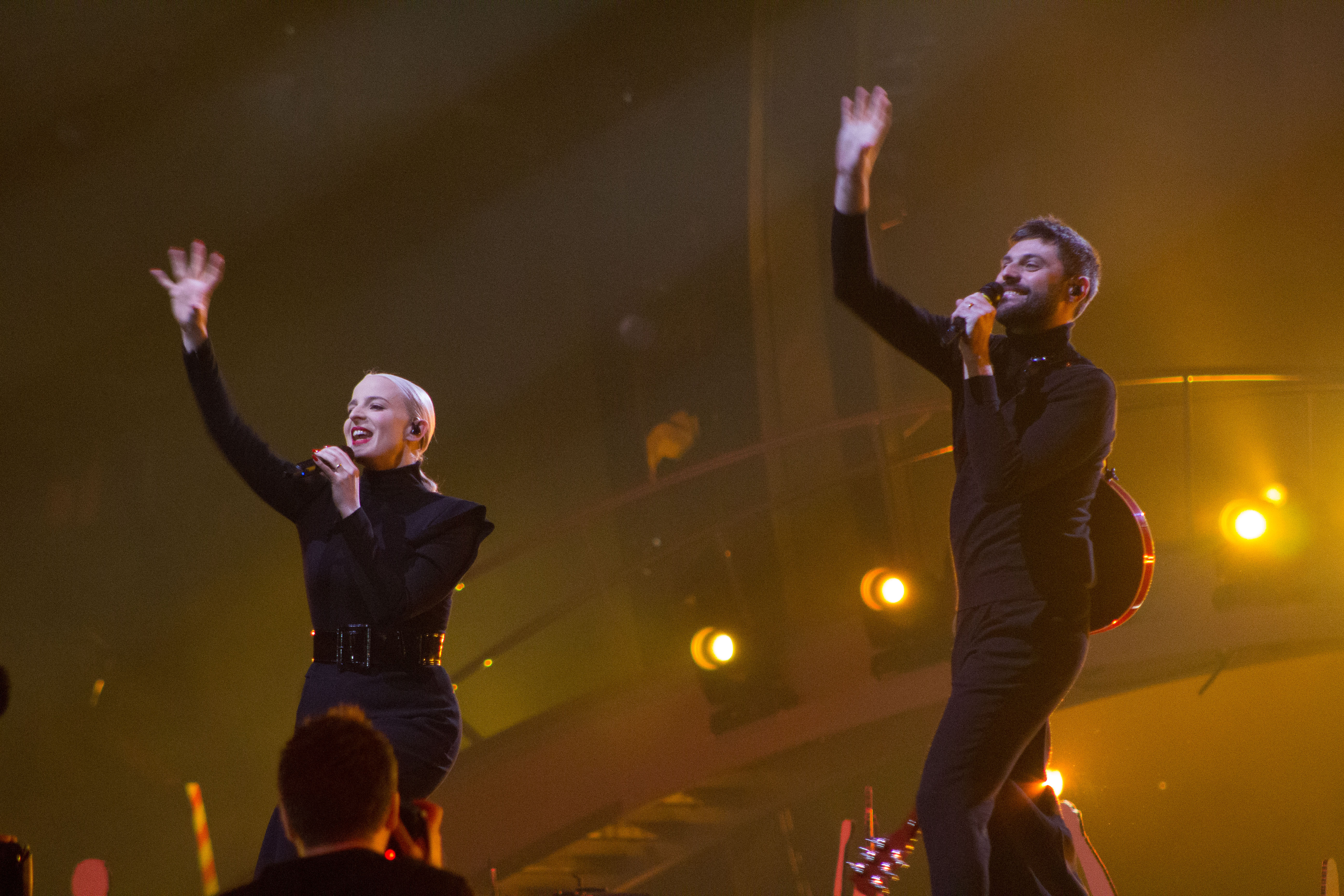
Madame Monsieur in Lisbon (2018)

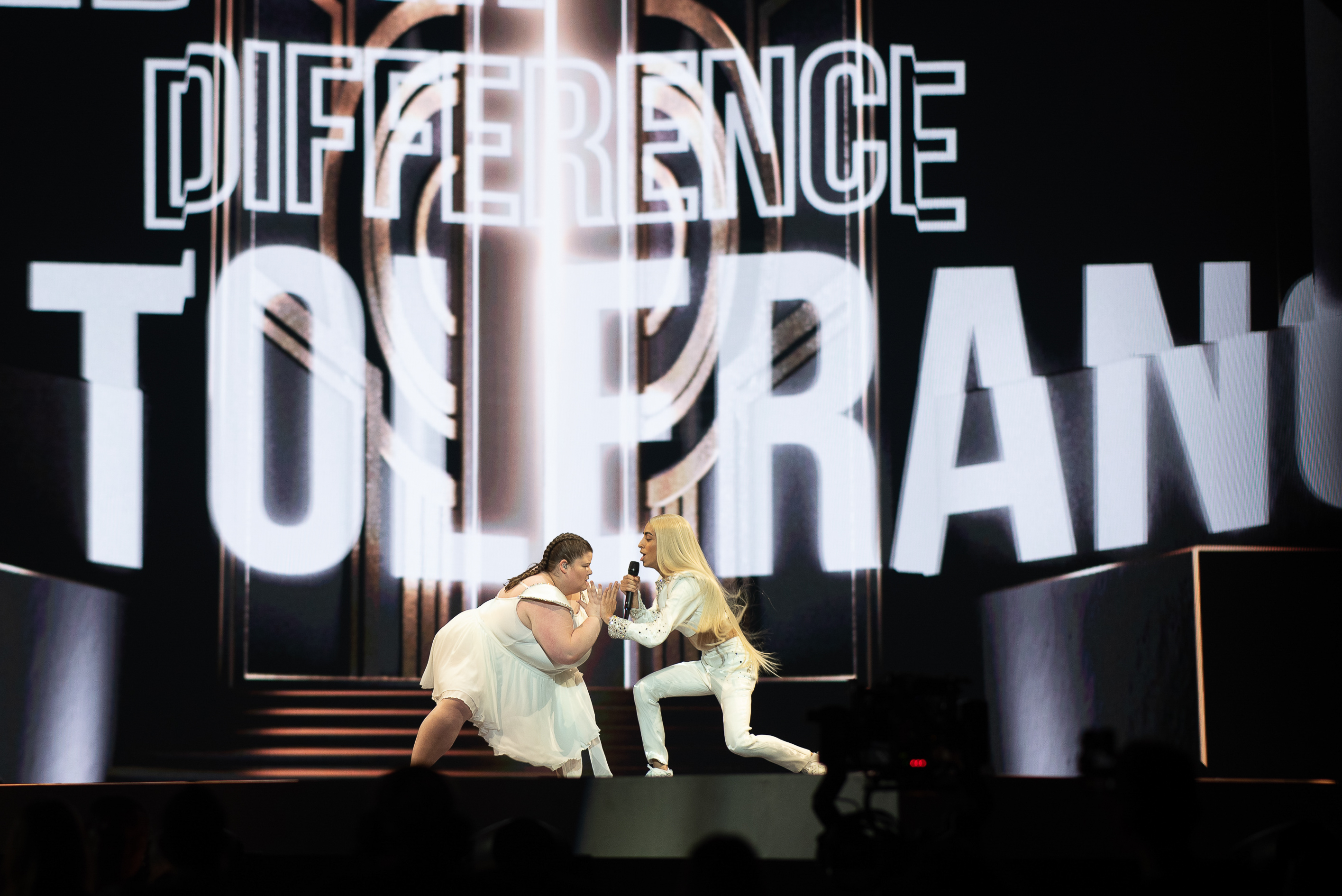
Bilal Hassani in Tel Aviv (2019)

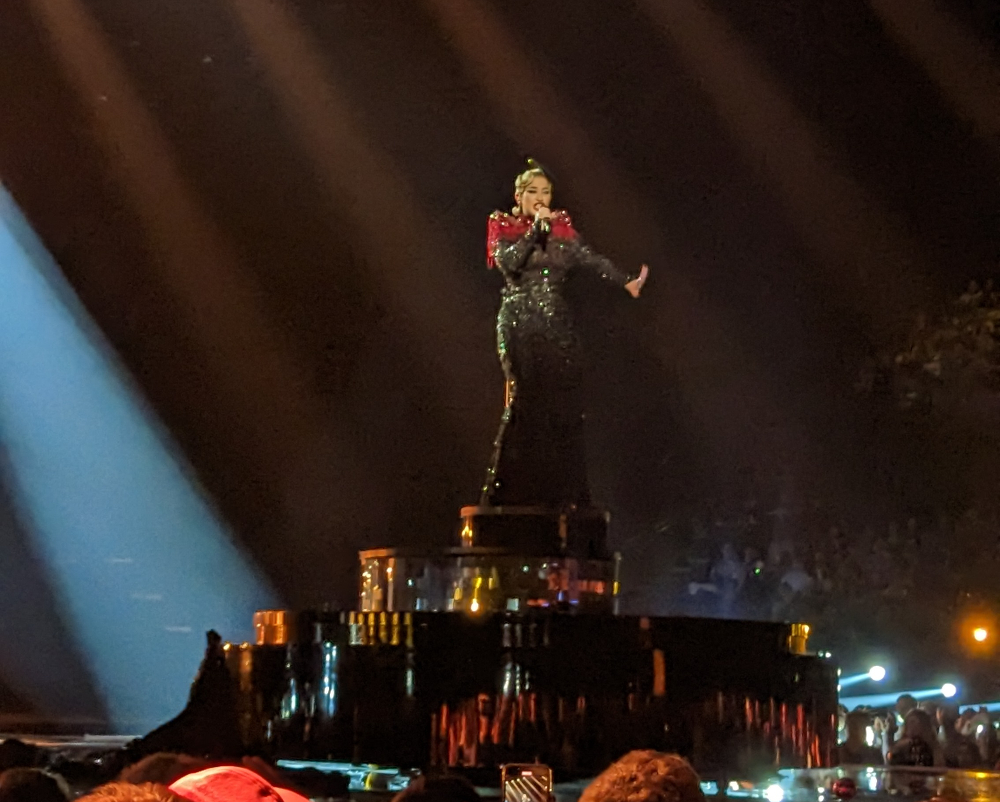
La Zarra in Liverpool (2023)

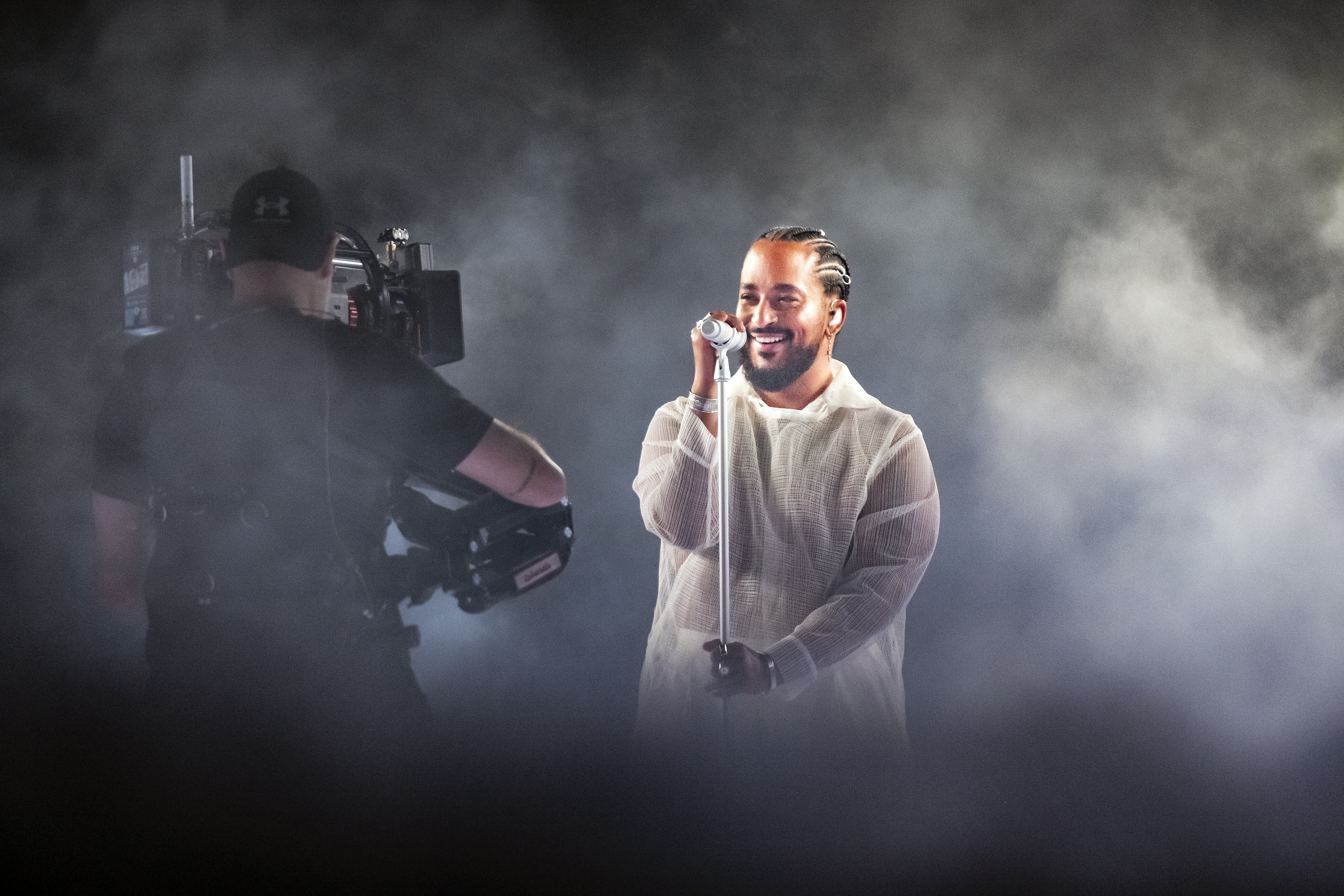
Slimane in Malmö (2024)

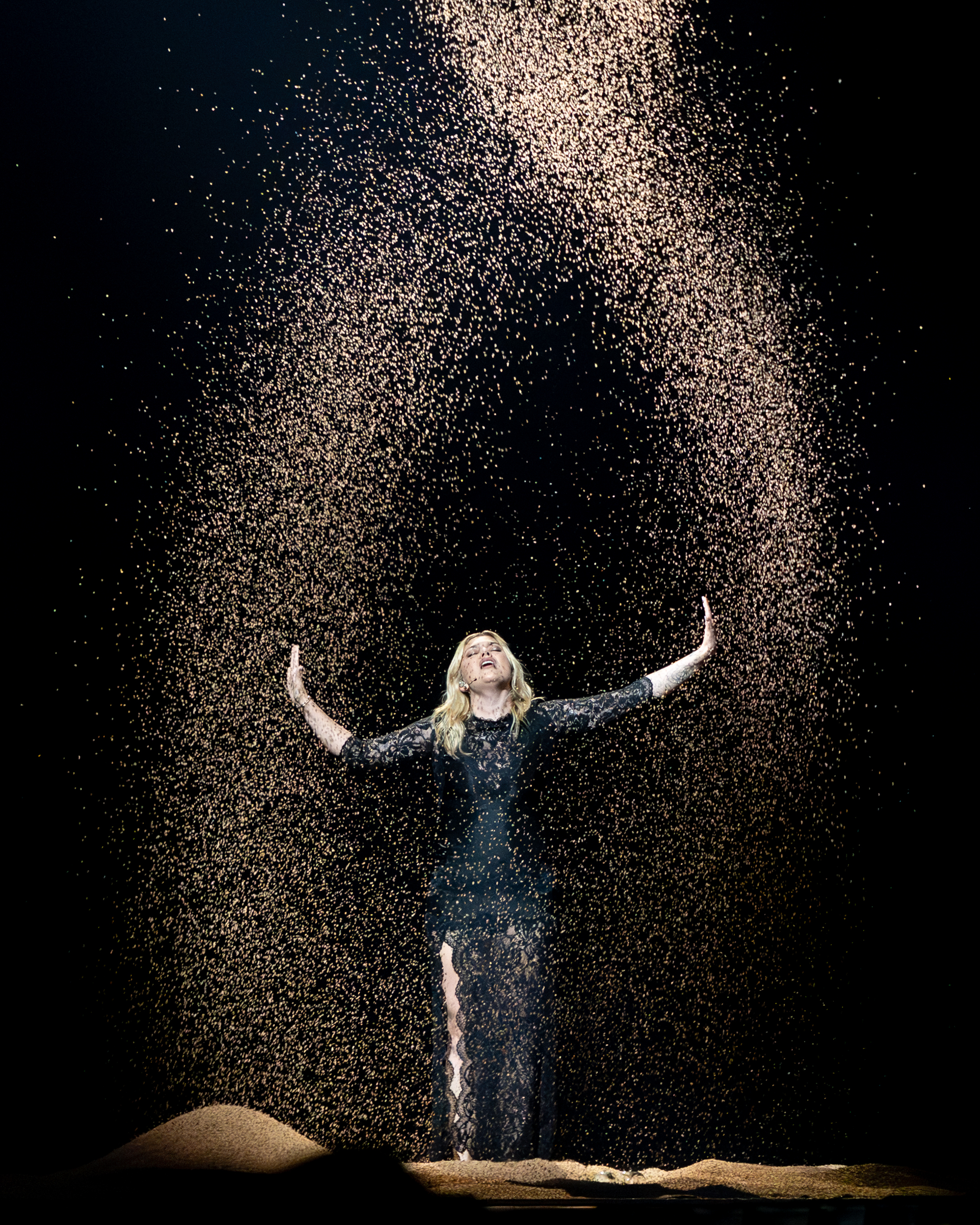
Louane in Basel (2025)

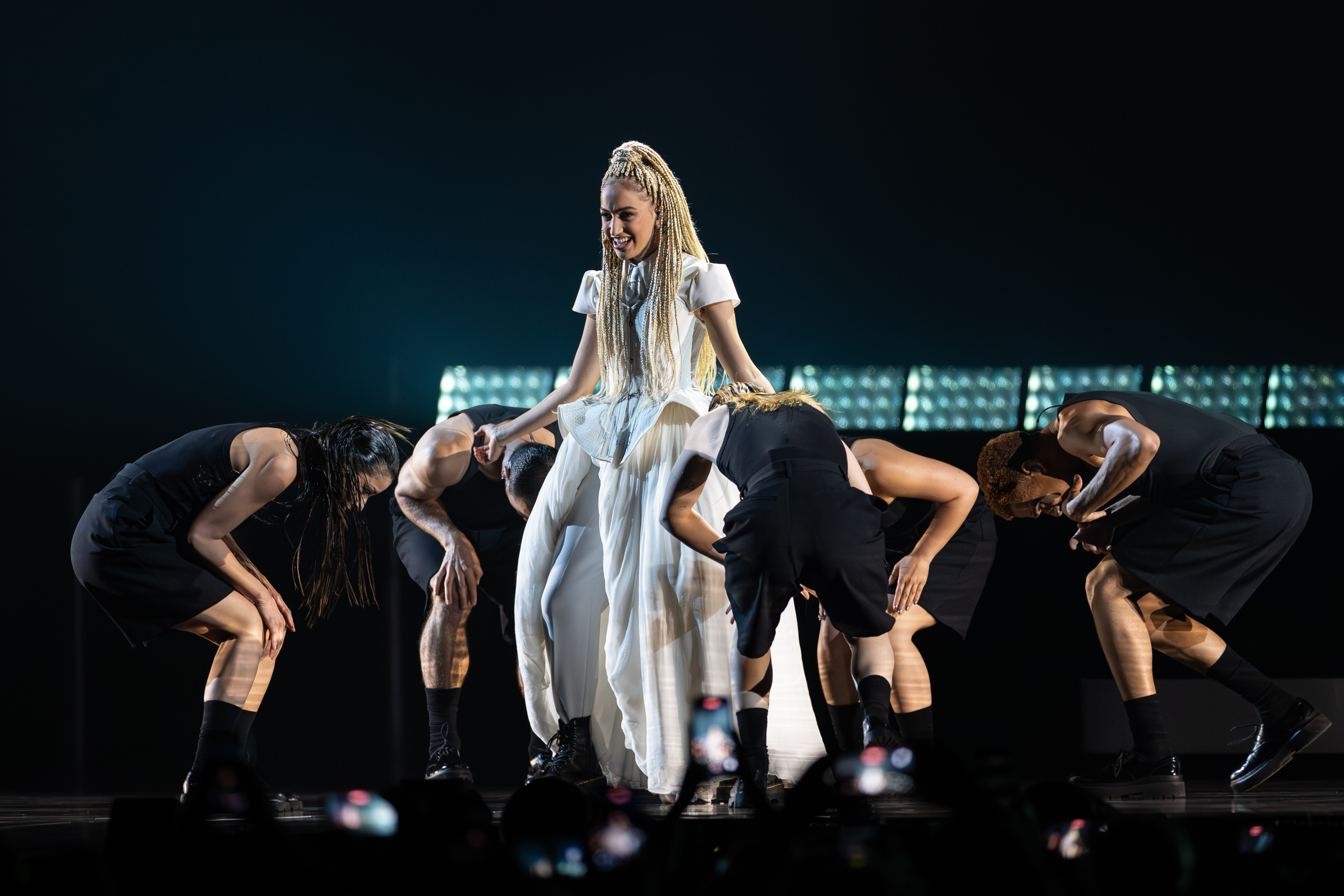
Monroe in Vienna (2026)

== See also ==
- France in the Junior Eurovision Song Contest – Junior version of the Eurovision Song Contest.
