= N'oubliez pas =

2015 song by Lisa Angell

Single by Lisa Angell

from the album Lisa Angell
- Released: May 2015
- Recorded: 2014
- Length: 3:02
- Label: Sony Music Entertainment France
- Songwriter(s): Moïse Albert; Michel Illouz; Laure Izon
- Producer(s): Thierry Blanchard

Lisa Angell singles chronology
"J'ai deux amours" (2014)	"N'oubliez pas" (2015)

Eurovision Song Contest 2015 entry
- Country: France
- Artist(s): Lisa Angell
- Language: French
- Composer(s): Michel Illouz, M. Albert
- Lyricist(s): M. Albert, Laure Izon

Finals performance
- Final result: 25th
- Final points: 4

Entry chronology
- ◄ "Moustache" (2014)
- "J'ai cherché" (2016) ►

"N'oubliez pas" (French pronunciation: [nublije pɑ]; "Don't forget") is a song performed by French singer Lisa Angell. The song represented France in the Eurovision Song Contest 2015. It finished in 25 out of 27 songs at Eurovision with only 4 points, one point below United Kingdom and slightly better than 2014's entry "Moustache" by Twin Twin, which finished in last place.

== Background ==
The song was written by Robert Goldman (credited as M. Albert) for Lisa Angell, with the idea of creating "a great and beautiful chanson that evokes the First World War and at heart all wars". The song was written around the time of Armistice Day, which commemorates the armistice signed between the Allies of World War I and Germany.

On 23 January 2015, Lisa Angell was announced by France 2 as the French representative in the Eurovision Song Contest 2015 with "N'oubliez pas".

== Live performances ==
The song was performed for the first time on a concert in November 2014 that commemorated the First World War centenary. Lisa Angell performed the song live on television for the first time during Le Grand Show, aired on France 2 on 28 February 2015.

On 23 May 2015 Angell performed the song live during the final of the Eurovision Song Contest 2015 at the Wiener Stadthalle in Vienna, Austria. She came 25th in the final only receiving 4 points, three from Armenia and one from San Marino.

== Charts ==
Chart performance for "N'oubliez pas"
Chart (2015)	Peak position
France (SNEP)	74
