= Moustache (song) =

2014 song by Twin Twin

Single by Twin Twin
- Released: 2014
- Composer(s): Pierre Beyres; Kim N'Guyen
- Lyricist(s): Lorent Idir; François Ardouvin

Music video
- "Moustache" on YouTube

Eurovision Song Contest 2014 entry
- Country: France
- Artist(s): Twin Twin
- Language: French
- Composer(s): Pierre Beyres; Kim N'Guyen
- Lyricist(s): Lorent Idir; François Ardouvin

Finals performance
- Final result: 26th
- Final points: 2

Entry chronology
- ◄ "L'enfer et moi" (2013)
- "N'oubliez pas" (2015) ►

Song presentation
- file; help

Official performance video
- "Moustache" (Final) on YouTube

"Moustache" is a song by French trio Twin Twin. It represented France at the Eurovision Song Contest 2014 in Denmark. It finished last in the final with 2 points. It was the first non-English language song to place last in the final since 2000.

== Music video ==
A music video for the song was released on 17 March 2014. It features the group as contestants on a game show, with lead singer Lorent desperately wanting to win a moustache in the competition. The video was directed by Guillaume Coulpier of Extermitent Production.

== Charts ==
Chart performance for "Moustache"
Chart (2014)	Peak position
Austria (Ö3 Austria Top 40)	60
France (SNEP)	115
Germany (GfK)	89
Ireland (IRMA)	79
Sweden (Sverigetopplistan)	53
UK Singles (OCC)	89

== See also ==
- France in the Eurovision Song Contest 2014
