= Sandrine François =

French singer

Sandrine François (born December 1980 in Paris) is a French singer who represented France at the Eurovision Song Contest 2002 with "Il faut du temps", coming in fifth position.

== Biography ==
François was discovered singing in a pub and invited to sing on the television show of Mireille Dumas. This appearance led to a record contract, and to her working with producer-writer-arranger Erick Benzi (who also worked with Jean-Jacques Goldman and Céline Dion, among others).

In 2002, François was invited by French television to represent her country in the Eurovision Song Contest. Rick Allison, Marie-Florence Gros and Patrick Bruel wrote a song for her called "Il faut du temps". She reached fifth position with 104 points.

She produced a solo album entitled Et si le monde..., comprising 14 tracks in French including "Il faut du temps" along with a variety of mid tempo tracks and power ballads.

Preceded by Natasha St-Pier with "Je n'ai que mon âme"	France in the Eurovision Song Contest; 2002	Succeeded by Louisa Baïleche with "Monts et merveilles"
