= Twin Twin =

French music group

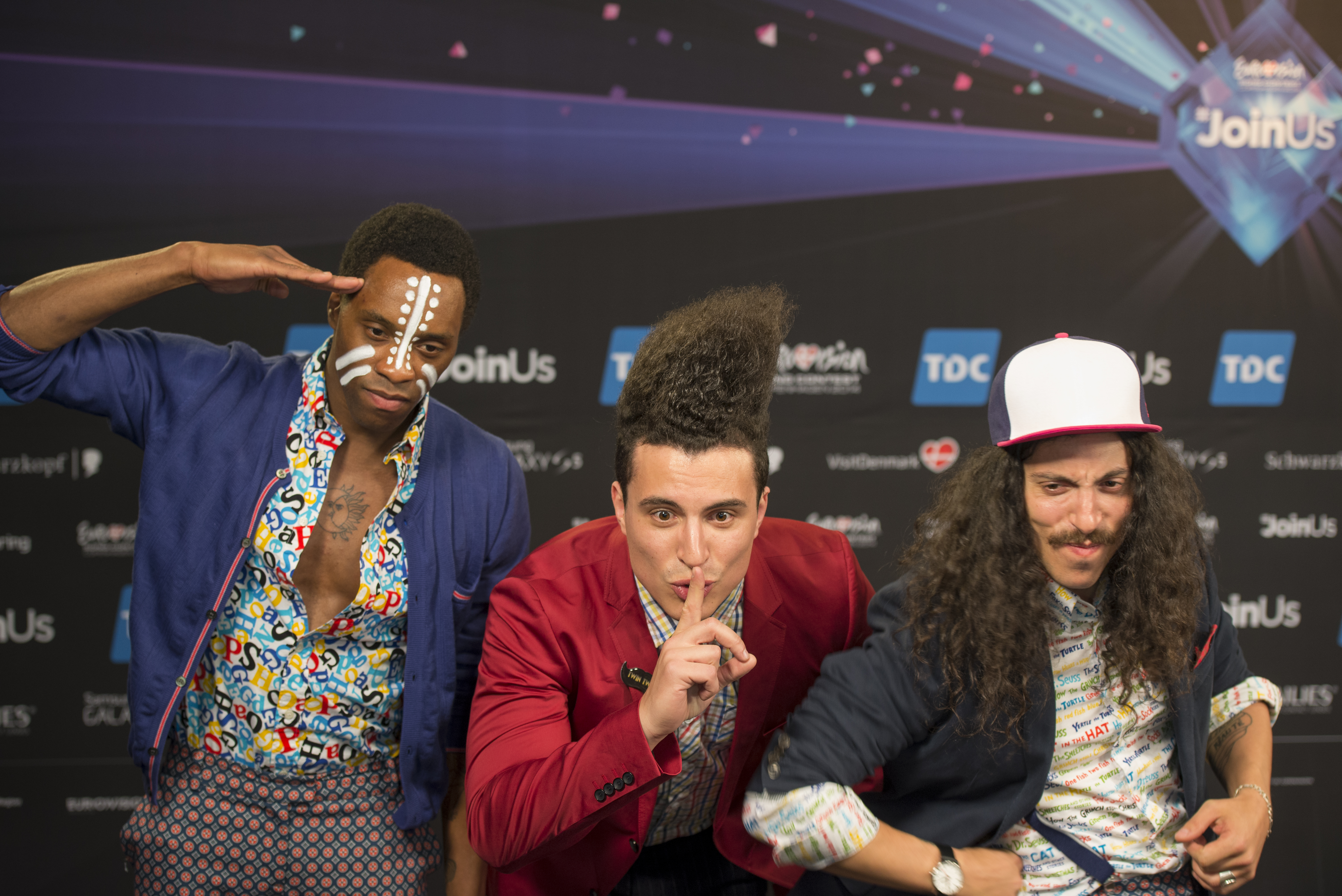

Background information
- Origin: Montreuil, Paris, France
- Genres: Pop, dance
- Years active: 2009-present
- Labels: SPNG
- Members: Lorent Idir; François Djemel; Patrick Biyik
- Website: http://www.twintwinohyeah.fr/

Twin Twin (stylised as TWIN TWIN) is a French music group from Montreuil, Seine-Saint-Denis. The group consists of Lorent Idir (of Algerian descent), François Djemel (of Algerian descent) and Patrick Biyik (of Congolese descent), and is characterised by a mixture of electro sounds, rock, and slam. Twin Twin also represented France in the Eurovision Song Contest 2014 in Copenhagen, Denmark, with the song "Moustache". They finished in last position in the grand final, a first for France in the Eurovision Song Contest, with two points.

== Discography ==
=== Albums ===
Title	Details	Peak chart positions
Title	Details	FRA
By My Side EP	Released: 25 November 2011; Label: Warner Music France	—
Vive la vie	Released: 17 April 2013; Special Edition released: 14 April 2014; Label: Warner Music France	—
"—" denotes a recording that did not chart or was not released in that territory.

=== Singles ===
Title	Year	Peak chart positions						Album
Title	Year	FRA	AUT	GER	IRE	SWE	UK	Album
"By My Side"	2011	—	—	—	—	—	—	Vive la vie
"Comme Toi" (featuring Lexicon)	2012	—	—	—	—	—	—	Vive la vie
"Moi Même"	2012	—	—	—	—	—	—	Vive la vie
"Moustache"	2014	115	60	89	79	53	89	Vive la vie
"—" denotes a single that did not chart or was not released in that territory.

Awards and achievements
Preceded by Amandine Bourgeois with "L'enfer et moi"	France in the Eurovision Song Contest; 2014	Succeeded by Lisa Angell with "N'oubliez pas"
