= Éric Jean-Jean =

French radio and television host

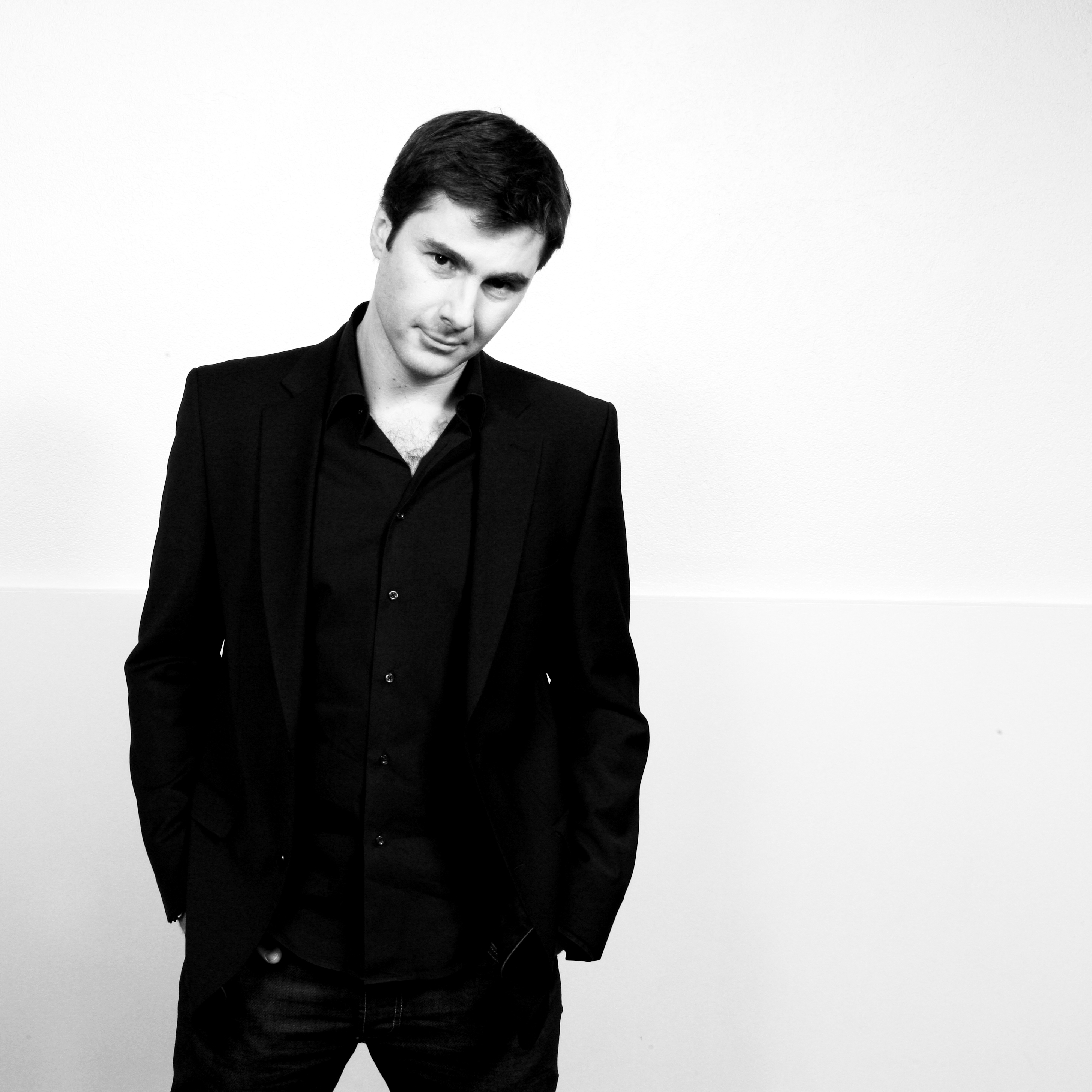
- Born: 20 September 1967 (age 58); Blaye, Gironde, France
- Education: Institut d'études politiques de Bordeaux
- Occupation: Radio host
- Employer: RTL2

Éric Jean-Jean (born 20 September 1967) is a French radio and television host. He is occasionally an actor.

== Biography ==
In 1988, he became a radio host joining the team Wit FM Bordeaux. After three years during which he mainly led interviews of singers, he was quickly spotted by the station NRJ in 1991, but continued the interviews.

In 1998, he hosted shows including Studio 22, Toute la musique que j'aime and others on RTL.

Furthermore, he made several television appearances in collaboration with NRJ and RTL, including several prime-times on channels TF1 and M6.

In 2008, M6 envisaged to propose to Jean-Jean the hosting of Nouvelle Star.

== Radio career ==
- on NRJ :
  - 6:00 am–9:00 am
  - 9:00 am–12:00 am
- on RTL :
- RTL vous offre vos vacances
- Concert d'un soir
- Les Mots bleus
- Paroles et Musique
- Studio 22
- Toute la musique que j'aime
- Ma liste préfèrée
- On en parlera demain
- Bonus Track
- Stop ou Encore
- on RTL2 :
- Le Drive RTL2

== TV career ==
- Tip-Top (TF1 – 1995)
- Dance d'or (TF1 – 1996)
- Soir Hit Machine (M6 – 1996)
- 50 ans de tubes (TF1 – 1999)
- OVNI (France 3 – 2000)
- Les Victoires de la Musique (France 2 – 2002)
- Voix sur Berges (France 3, France 4, Odyssée – 2005–2006)
- Demi-Finale de l'Eurovision 2006 (France4 – 2006)
- C'est Mieux le matin 2006 (France 3)
- Concert Champ libre (France 2 : 14 July 2008)

== Filmography ==
- Héroïne by Gérard Kraftzick, 1995
- Un homme à la maison, TV film, 1999
