= Amina Annabi =

French-Tunisian singer and actress

- أمينة العنابي
- Born: Amina Annabi; 5 March 1962 (age 64); Carthage, Tunisia
- Citizenship: Tunisia; France
- Occupations: Singer; songwriter; actress
- Years active: 1978–present
- Musical career
- Origin: Carthage, Tunisia
- Genres: Pop; world; electro
- Labels: Phillips; Mercury
- Member of: Pajala Tatawin
- Formerly of: Agir Réagir; Peace Choir; The Mandinkas
- Website: aminaannabi.free.fr

Amina Annabi (Arabic: أمينة العنابي, romanized: Amīna al-ʿAnnābī; born 5 March 1962) is a French-Tunisian singer-songwriter and actress. She finished second in the tied Eurovision Song Contest 1991, held in Rome, after a countback, scoring equal 146 points alongside Carola from Sweden.

== Early life ==
Amina was born into a family of musicians. Her father is French and her mother is Tunisian. Her grandmother was a musician and one of her uncles was involved in setting up the Tabarka Festival in Tunisia, so Amina got the chance to see a number of music stars, going along to concerts by Joan Baez, James Brown and the famous Algerian diva Warda. At the Tabarka music festival is where Amina would get to meet the young Senegalese star Wasis Diop. They became friends and they had the opportunity to work together some years later. In 1975, Amina and her mother, a talented musician and composer, moved together to Paris.

Three years later Amina formed her own group, after showing her talent in singing and dancing a variety of music styles, from soul to traditional aigypt songs. The group made appearances in many local schools but it was in 1982 when Amina started to build her solo career. By that time she got involved with Radio Nova, Paris' leading radio station in world music. One of the producers of the station was Martin Meissonnier. He started to work with Amina and soon they became a couple—their daughter was born in 1986. In 1983 she won a music contest with a rap song, "Shehérazade", influenced by Arab rhythms. It was released as a CD single. Amina began performing in Paris around this time.

== Career ==
=== Music ===
After recording an album with the Japanese musician Yasuaki Shimizu, she became extremely popular in Japan where she even toured in 1987. She did lead vocals on a track by Haruomi Hosono and she launched a career in cinema.

The same year she recorded her debut album, Yalil (Night) produced by Martin Meissonnier. The album received excellent reviews and it was released in 22 countries around the world. It was also released in the USA where it peaked at No. 5 at the Billboard world music charts.

In 1991, Amina won 'Le prix Piaf' as Best Female Singer of the Year, then she went on to get involved in Peter Gabriel's peace project during the Gulf War. Joining a host of international stars in the studio, Amina took part in the recording of an EP which featured a new version of John Lennon's "Give Peace a Chance". The same year she participated in the Eurovision Song Contest held in Rome with one song of her own, entitled "Le Dernier qui a parlé...". She finished 2nd with the same number of points as the winner, following a tie-break procedure.. This remains France's highest placement since 1977, equalled in 2021 by Barbara Pravi with "Voilà".

Right after the Eurovision Contest, Amina recorded her second album, Wa di yé (Love is Unique) and she toured around France to promote it.

In 1994 Malcolm McLaren asked Amina to guest on his album, Paris, along with Catherine Deneuve and Françoise Hardy. After that Amina took a long break travelling to her homeland and she was back in 1999 with new albums and concerts around the globe.

She read the French jury's votes during the final of Sweden's Eurovision qualifier Melodifestivalen 2010.

=== Cinema ===
Amina's first film credit was as a supporting role in the 1990 film Maman. Later that same year she joined an international cast led by John Malkovich and Debra Winger, where she played the role of a naked prostitute in the Bernardo Bertolucci movie The Sheltering Sky.

In 1992 she took part in Claude Lelouch's great fresco La Belle Histoire, where she played a sister to Jesus Christ. In 1993 she appeared in Nicholas Klotz' The Sacred Night.

In 1993 Amina got her first lead female role opposite Spanish star Miguel Bosé in La Nuit sacrée.

Later that year she got involved with an English film entitled The Hour of the Pig (released in the US as The Advocate) where she plays a Moor that strips naked to offer herself to the movie's main character, the lawyer defending animals accused of witchcraft, in order to save a pig that is their only source of food for the coming winter.

Russian director Andrei Konchalovsky chose Amina to play in his film Ulysse, which was broadcast on US networks.

== Discography ==
=== Albums ===
- 1990, Yalil (Philips)
- 1992, Wa di yé (Philips)
- 1999, Annabi (Mercury)
- 2001, Nomad - The Best of Amina (Mercury)
- 2015, Unveil (EP)
- 2022, La Lumière de mes choix (29 Music)

=== Songs ===
- 3ada El Ghazal
- Allah Ya Moulena
- Atame
- Belly Dancer
- Le dernier qui a parlé
- Dis moi pourquoi
- Ederlezi
- Ezzayakoum
- Habibi 2
- La mauvaise graine
- Lirrili
- Mektoubi
- My Man
- Waadileh
- Ya baba
- Zahra

=== Soundtracks ===
- Princesse Shéhérazade

== Filmography ==
- Maman (1990)
- The Sheltering Sky (1990)
- La Belle Histoire (1992)
- La Nuit sacrée (1993)
- The Hour of the Pig (1993)
- Dead Man Walking (1995)
- Cleopatra (1999)
- La Mécanique des femmes (2000)
- Philosophale (2001)
- Inch'Allah Dimanche (2001)
- Dreams of Trespass (2002)
- Les Marins perdus (2003)
- Once Upon a Time in the Oued (2005)
- Comme tout le monde (2006)
- Cairo Time (2009)

Preceded by Joëlle Ursull with White and Black Blues	France in the Eurovision Song Contest; 1991	Succeeded by Kali with Monté la riviè
