= Israel in the Eurovision Song Contest 2014 =

- Eurovision Song Contest 2014
- Country: Israel
- Selection process: Artist: Internal selection Song: Kdam Eurovision 2014
- Selection date: Artist: 11 January 2014; Song: 5 March 2014

Competing entry
- Song: "Same Heart"
- Artist: Mei Finegold
- Songwriters: Rami Talmid

Placement
- Semi-final result: Failed to qualify (14th)

Participation chronology

Israel was represented at the Eurovision Song Contest 2014 with the song "Same Heart" written by Rami Talmid. The song was performed by Mei Finegold, who was internally selected by the Israeli broadcaster Israel Broadcasting Authority to compete at the 2014 contest in Copenhagen, Denmark. The song Finegold would perform at Eurovision was selected through the national final Kdam Eurovision 2014 that featured three songs submitted by the public and Finegold herself, which were presented to the public via the release of their official music videos during a show on 27 February 2014. "Same Heart" emerged as the winning song on 5 March 2014 after gaining 55% of the public vote.

Israel was drawn to compete in the second semi-final of the Eurovision Song Contest which took place on 8 May 2014. Performing during the show in position 2, "Same Heart" was not announced among the top 10 entries of the second semi-final and therefore did not qualify to compete in the final. It was later revealed that Israel placed fourteenth out of the 15 participating countries in the semi-final with 19 points.

== Background ==
Prior to the 2014 contest, Israel had participated in the Eurovision Song Contest thirty-six times since its first entry in 1973. Israel has won the contest on three occasions: in 1978 with the song "A-Ba-Ni-Bi" performed by Izhar Cohen and the Alphabeta, in 1979 with the song "Hallelujah" performed by Milk and Honey and in 1998 with the song "Diva" performed by Dana International. Since the introduction of semi-finals to the format of the Eurovision Song Contest in 2004, Israel has, to this point, managed to qualify to the final five times, including two top ten results in 2005 with Shiri Maimon and "HaSheket SheNish'ar" placing fourth, and in 2008 with Boaz and "The Fire in Your Eyes" placing ninth. Between 2011 and 2013, Israel has failed to qualify to the final consecutively, which included their 2013 entry "Rak Bishvilo" performed by Moran Mazor.

The Israeli national broadcaster, Israel Broadcasting Authority (IBA) had been in charge of the nation's participation in the contest since its debut in 1973. IBA confirmed Israel's participation in the contest on 10 October 2013. On 4 December 2013, IBA announced that it would conduct an internal selection to select the artist that would represent Israel and a national final to select the song for the artist.

== Before Eurovision ==
=== Artist selection ===
On 11 January 2014, IBA announced that Mei Finegold was selected as the Israeli representative for the Eurovision Song Contest 2014. A special committee consisting of music industry professionals considered sixteen artists, of which Maya Bouskilla and Ella Doron were highly considered before Finegold was ultimately selected. The members of the committee were Bracha Ofir (retired judge), Izchak Sonnenschein (Head of Israeli Eurovision delegation), Udi Bezalel (delegation member), Moshe Morad (director of 88FM), Tali Katz (Channel 1 music editor), Tal Argaman (music editor at 88FM), Leon Kichler (former vice president of OGAE Israel), Liron Ben-Shimon (musician and producer) and Ofer Shafrir (show director). It was also announced that a national final titled Kdam Eurovision 2014 featuring three songs would take place to select her song.

=== Kdam Eurovision 2014 ===
IBA opened the public song submission following the announcement of Finegold as the selected artist with the deadline on 28 January 2014. 78 submissions were received at the close of the deadline, which were subsequently evaluated by the committee that shortlisted ten songs. Two songs were ultimately chosen from the public submissions while one was provided by Finegold for the competition. The official music videos for the three songs, all directed by Lior Nordman, were presented on 27 February 2014 during a special presentation programme broadcast on Channel 1 and the public was able to vote for their favourite song through SMS until 4 March 2014. The winning song, "Same Heart", was selected solely by the public vote and revealed during a special televised broadcast on Channel 1 on 5 March 2014.

Draw	Song	Songwriter(s)	Televote	Place
1	"Same Heart"	Rami Talmid	55%	1
2	"Nish'eret Iti" (נשארת איתי)	Loren de Paz, Chen Metzger Eder	40%	2
3	"Be Proud"	Mei Finegold	5%	3

== At Eurovision ==
Finegold presenting herself at the contest

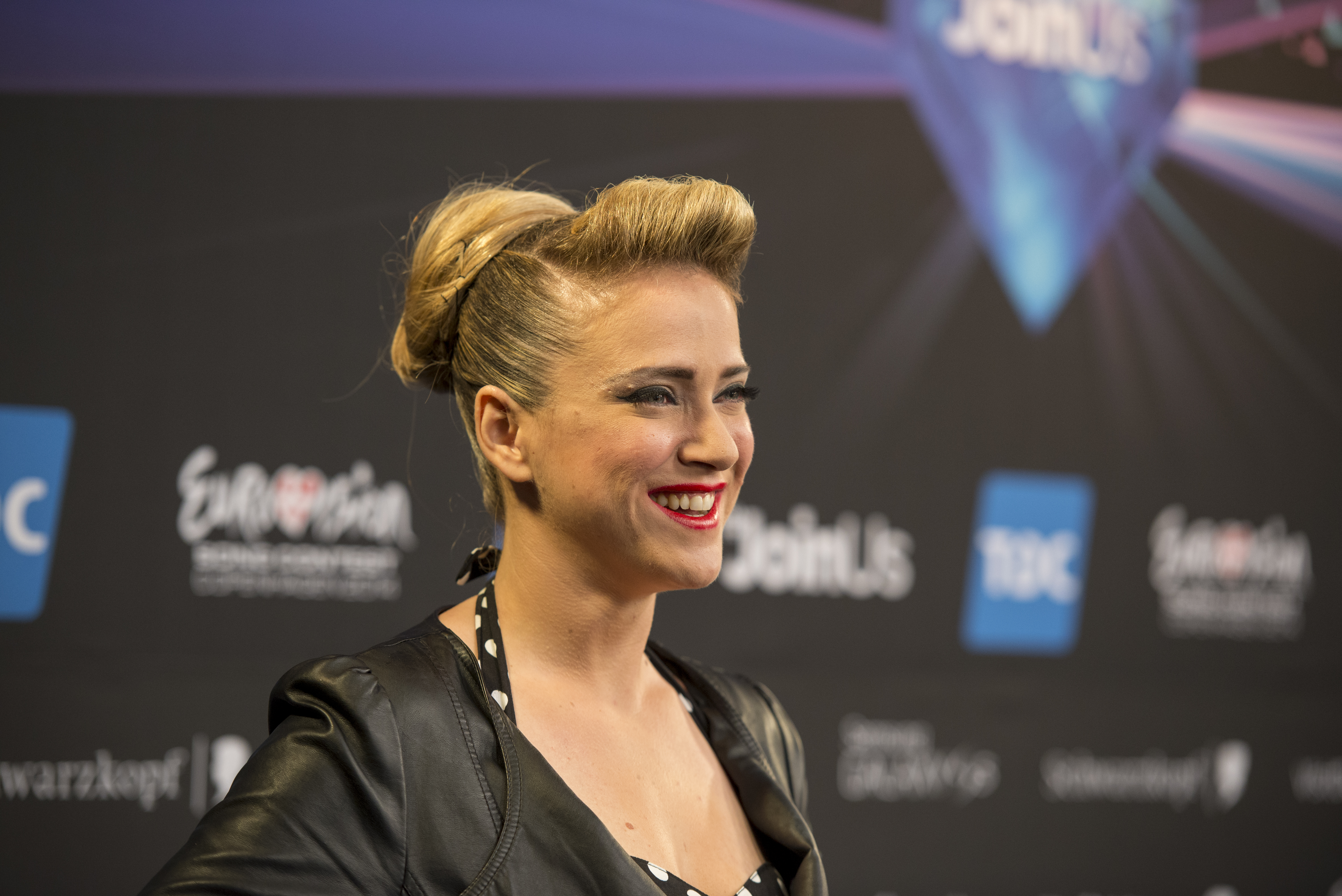
Mei Finegold during a press meet and greet

According to Eurovision rules, all nations with the exceptions of the host country and the "Big Five" (France, Germany, Italy, Spain and the United Kingdom) are required to qualify from one of two semi-finals in order to compete for the final; the top ten countries from each semi-final progress to the final. The European Broadcasting Union (EBU) split up the competing countries into six different pots based on voting patterns from previous contests, with countries with favourable voting histories put into the same pot. On 20 January 2014, a special allocation draw was held which placed each country into one of the two semi-finals, as well as which half of the show they would perform in. The EBU's Reference Group approved a request by the Israeli broadcaster for Israel to compete in the second semi-final on 8 May 2014 due to the date of the first semi-final, 6 May 2014, coinciding with the Yom Hazikaron memorial day. During the allocation draw, it was determined that Israel would perform in the first half of the second semi-final.

Once all the competing songs for the 2014 contest had been released, the running order for the semi-finals was decided by the shows' producers rather than through another draw, so that similar songs were not placed next to each other. Israel was set to perform in position 2, following the entry from Malta and before the entry from Norway.

In Israel, the two semi-finals and the final were televised live on Channel 1 with Hebrew subtitles and Channel 33 with Arabic subtitles. The three shows were also broadcast via radio on 88 FM with commentary by Kobi Menora and Yuval Caspin. The Israeli spokesperson, who announced the Israeli votes during the final, was Ofer Nachshon.

=== Semi-final ===
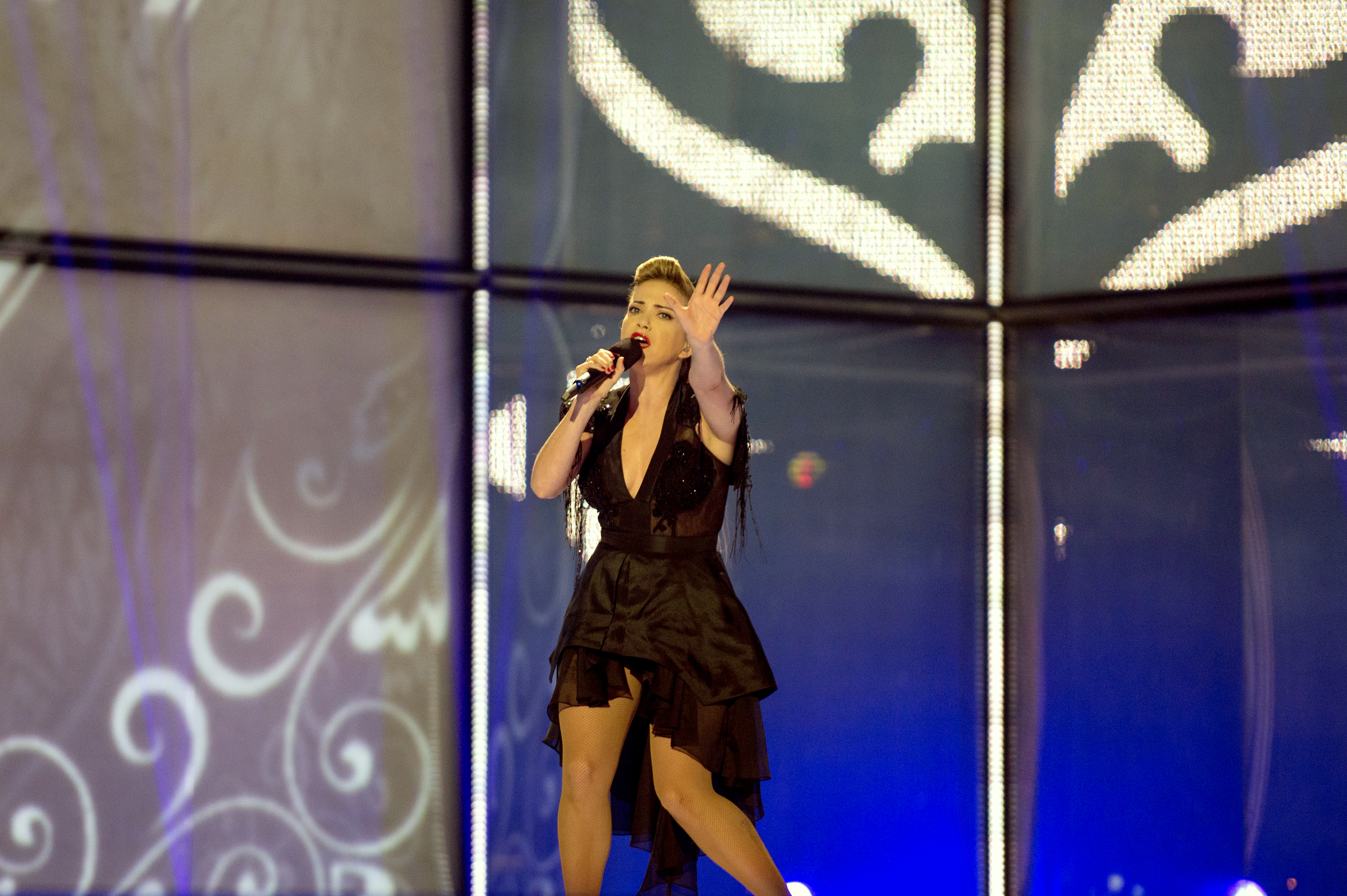
Mei Finegold during a rehearsal before the second semi-final

Mei Finegold took part in technical rehearsals on 29 April and 3 May, followed by dress rehearsals on 7 and 8 May. This included the jury show on 7 May where the professional juries of each country watched and voted on the competing entries. On the day of the second semi-final, Israel was considered by bookmakers to be the sixth most likely country to advance into the final.

The Israeli performance featured Mei Finegold performing a choreographed routine in a sleeveless black dress together with two dancers in black leotards. The stage transitioned between red, blue and gold colours with the LED screens displaying black Asian inspired architectural shapes and designs. Finegold and her dancers concluded the performance on the left hand side of the stage's catwalk. The two dancers performing on stage with Mei Finegold were Shiran Lagziel and Marin Termetz.

At the end of the show, Israel was not announced among the top 10 entries in the second semi-final and therefore failed to qualify to compete in the final. It was later revealed that Israel placed fourteenth in the semi-final, receiving a total of 19 points.

=== Voting ===
Voting during the three shows involved each country awarding points from 1–8, 10 and 12 as determined by a combination of 50% national jury and 50% televoting. Each nation's jury consisted of five music industry professionals who are citizens of the country they represent, with their names published before the contest to ensure transparency. This jury judged each entry based on: vocal capacity; the stage performance; the song's composition and originality; and the overall impression by the act. In addition, no member of a national jury was permitted to be related in any way to any of the competing acts in such a way that they cannot vote impartially and independently. The individual rankings of each jury member as well as the nation's televoting results were released shortly after the grand final.

Below is a breakdown of points awarded to Israel and awarded by Israel in the second semi-final and grand final of the contest, and the breakdown of the jury voting and televoting conducted during the two shows:

==== Points awarded to Israel ====
Points awarded to Israel (Semi-final 2)
Score	Country
12 points	
10 points	
8 points	
7 points	
6 points	Greece
5 points	Macedonia
4 points	
3 points	Finland
2 points	Belarus; Germany
1 point	Romania

==== Points awarded by Israel ====
Points awarded by Israel (Semi-final 2)
Score	Country
12 points	Romania
10 points	Austria
8 points	Slovenia
7 points	Belarus
6 points	Greece
5 points	Switzerland
4 points	Poland
3 points	Finland
2 points	Macedonia
1 point	Ireland

Points awarded by Israel (Final)
Score	Country
12 points	Austria
10 points	Sweden
8 points	Romania
7 points	Hungary
6 points	Armenia
5 points	Ukraine
4 points	Spain
3 points	Russia
2 points	Greece
1 point	Belarus

==== Detailed voting results ====
The following members comprised the Israeli jury:

- Moshe Datz (jury chairperson) – singer and producer, represented Israel in the 1991 Contest as part of Duo Datz
- Chen Aharoni – singer
- Amir Cohen – producer and radio broadcaster
- Doron Medalie – director, writer, composer
- Nikka Bukaee – singer

Detailed voting results from Israel (Semi-final 2)
Draw	Country	M. Datz	C. Aharoni	A. Cohen	D. Medalie	N. Bukaee	Jury Rank	Televote Rank	Combined Rank	Points
01	Malta	9	13	11	8	12	12	9	12	
02	Israel									
03	Norway	13	8	12	11	14	13	11	13	
04	Georgia	8	14	13	14	10	14	12	14	
05	Poland	14	1	14	5	13	10	5	7	4
06	Austria	2	4	2	1	6	2	2	2	10
07	Lithuania	4	9	8	4	9	6	13	11	
08	Finland	7	5	9	6	7	7	8	8	3
09	Ireland	12	7	7	13	8	9	10	10	1
10	Belarus	6	12	5	9	2	8	3	4	7
11	Macedonia	1	6	1	2	1	1	14	9	2
12	Switzerland	11	11	10	12	5	11	4	6	5
13	Greece	10	2	6	3	11	5	7	5	6
14	Slovenia	3	10	4	7	4	4	6	3	8
15	Romania	5	3	3	10	3	3	1	1	12

Detailed voting results from Israel (Final)
Draw	Country	M. Datz	C. Aharoni	A. Cohen	D. Medalie	N. Bukaee	Jury Rank	Televote Rank	Combined Rank	Points
01	Ukraine	5	8	10	16	10	7	5	6	5
02	Belarus	13	23	11	20	11	17	7	10	1
03	Azerbaijan	7	16	13	14	14	10	16	11	
04	Iceland	23	18	25	19	21	24	26	26	
05	Norway	22	9	23	15	15	20	20	22	
06	Romania	6	10	4	21	4	6	4	3	8
07	Armenia	14	11	15	18	7	11	1	5	6
08	Montenegro	9	13	14	9	17	9	25	19	
09	Poland	19	5	20	11	26	18	12	15	
10	Greece	17	6	8	5	8	5	14	9	2
11	Austria	2	2	3	1	1	1	2	1	12
12	Germany	24	26	12	25	22	25	24	25	
13	Sweden	1	4	1	2	3	2	6	2	10
14	France	25	7	24	24	24	21	19	21	
15	Russia	8	24	2	23	9	14	3	8	3
16	Italy	12	20	16	12	12	16	22	20	
17	Slovenia	11	19	9	13	13	12	21	18	
18	Finland	10	12	22	4	6	8	18	12	
19	Spain	3	14	5	3	2	4	11	7	4
20	Switzerland	21	21	17	22	23	22	9	17	
21	Hungary	4	1	6	7	5	3	8	4	7
22	Malta	20	22	26	17	20	23	23	24	
23	Denmark	16	15	7	8	19	13	17	16	
24	Netherlands	18	17	21	10	16	19	10	14	
25	San Marino	26	25	19	26	18	26	15	23	
26	United Kingdom	15	3	18	6	25	15	13	13	
