= Macedonia in the Eurovision Song Contest 2014 =

- Eurovision Song Contest 2014
- Country: Macedonia
- Selection process: Internal selection
- Announcement date: Artist: 28 August 2013; Song: 22 February 2014

Competing entry
- Song: "To the Sky"
- Artist: Tijana
- Songwriters: Darko Dimitrov; Lazar Cvetkoski; Elena Risteska

Placement
- Semi-final result: Failed to qualify (13th)

Participation chronology

Macedonia (Note: Officially under the provisional appellation "former Yugoslav Republic of Macedonia", abbreviated "FYR Macedonia".) was represented at the Eurovision Song Contest 2014 with the song "To the Sky" written by Darko Dimitrov, Lazar Cvetkoski and Elena Risteska. The song was performed by Tijana, who was internally selected by the Macedonian broadcaster Macedonian Radio Television (MRT) to compete for Macedonia at the 2014 contest in Copenhagen, Denmark. Songwriter Elena Risteska represented Macedonia in the Eurovision Song Contest 2006 with the song "Ninanajna" where she placed twelfth in the grand final of the competition. Tijana's appointment as the Macedonian representative was announced on 22 February 2014, while her song, "To the Sky", was presented to the public in a special edition of the MRT show Hit na mesecot.

Macedonia was drawn to compete in the second semi-final of the Eurovision Song Contest which took place on 8 May 2014. Performing during the show in position 11, "To the Sky" was not announced among the top 10 entries of the second semi-final and therefore did not qualify to compete in the final. It was later revealed that Macedonia placed thirteenth out of the 15 participating countries in the semi-final with 33 points.

== Background ==
Prior to the 2014 contest, Macedonia had participated in the Eurovision Song Contest thirteen times since its first entry in 1998. The nation's best result in the contest to this point was twelfth, which it achieved in 2006 with the song "Ninanajna" performed by Elena Risteska. Following the introduction of semi-finals for the 2004, Macedonia had featured in only five finals.

The Macedonian national broadcaster, Macedonian Radio Television (MRT), broadcasts the event within Macedonia and organises the selection process for the nation's entry. Macedonia had previously selected their entry for the Eurovision Song Contest through both national finals and internal selections. MRT confirmed their intentions to participate at the 2014 Eurovision Song Contest on 28 August 2013. Between 2008 and 2011, Macedonia selected their entries using the national final Skopje Fest. During this period, the nation failed to qualify to the final on every occasion. Since 2012, the broadcaster internally selected Macedonia's entry, resulting in a single qualification to the final during this period in 2012. For 2014, the broadcaster again opted to internally select the Macedonian entry.

== Before Eurovision ==
=== Internal selection ===
On 28 August 2013, MRT announced during the evening news programme Dnevnik that they had internally selected Tijana Dapčević to represent Macedonia in Copenhagen. Tijana previously attempted to represent Macedonia at the Eurovision Song Contest by competing in the country's national final selections on several occasions. Her earliest attempt was in 1996 when she competed with the song "Ti prostuvam" which placed third. She later competed in 2002 with the song "Izgrev" which placed fourth and in 2005 but failed to qualify from the first phase. She also competed in the 2006 Serbian and Montenegrin national final with the song "Greh" which placed eighth.

On 3 February 2014, it was announced that Tijana would perform the song "Pobeda" at the Eurovision Song Contest 2014. The song was later retitled as "Tamu kaj što pripagjam" and was presented to the public in a special edition of the MRT 1 show Hit na mesecot ("Hit of the Month"), which took place on 22 February 2014 and was hosted by Marko Mark and Aleksandra Jovanovska. The English version, "To the Sky", was also presented during the show. "Tamu kaj što pripagjam" was composed by Darko Dimitrov and Lazar Cvetkoski with lyrics written by Dimitrov and Elena Risteska who represented Macedonia in the Eurovision Song Contest 2006, and was selected from over 50 proposals by composers across the Balkan region. Tijana previously stated that she favoured all three songs received from Darko Dimitrov. On 9 March 2014, MRT announced that the English version of the song would be performed at the contest.

=== Promotion ===
Tijana made several appearances across Europe to specifically promote "To the Sky" as the Macedonian Eurovision entry. On 23 March, Tijana performed during the final of the first season of the reality singing competition X Factor Adria, which was held at the Kombank Arena in Belgrade, Serbia. On 31 March, Tijana performed during the Eurovision in Concert event which was held at the Melkweg venue in Amsterdam, Netherlands and hosted by Cornald Maas and Sandra Reemer. On 15 April, Tijana performed during the London Eurovision Party, which was held at the Café de Paris venue in London, United Kingdom and hosted by Nicki French and Paddy O'Connell.

== At Eurovision ==
Tijana presenting herself and "To the Sky" at the Eurovision Song Contest 2014

According to Eurovision rules, all nations with the exceptions of the host country and the "Big Five" (France, Germany, Italy, Spain and the United Kingdom) are required to qualify from one of two semi-finals in order to compete for the final; the top ten countries from each semi-final progress to the final. The European Broadcasting Union (EBU) split up the competing countries into six different pots based on voting patterns from previous contests, with countries with favourable voting histories put into the same pot. On 20 January 2014, a special allocation draw was held which placed each country into one of the two semi-finals, as well as which half of the show they would perform in. Macedonia was placed into the second semi-final, to be held on 8 May 2014, and was scheduled to perform in the second half of the show.

Once all the competing songs for the 2014 contest had been released, the running order for the semi-finals was decided by the shows' producers rather than through another draw, so that similar songs were not placed next to each other. Macedonia was set to perform in position 11, following the entry from Belarus and before the entry from Switzerland.

The two semi-finals and final were broadcast in Macedonia on MRT 1, MRT Sat and Radio Skopje with commentary by Karolina Petkovska. The Macedonian spokesperson, who announced the Macedonian votes during the final, was Marko Mark.

=== Semi-final ===
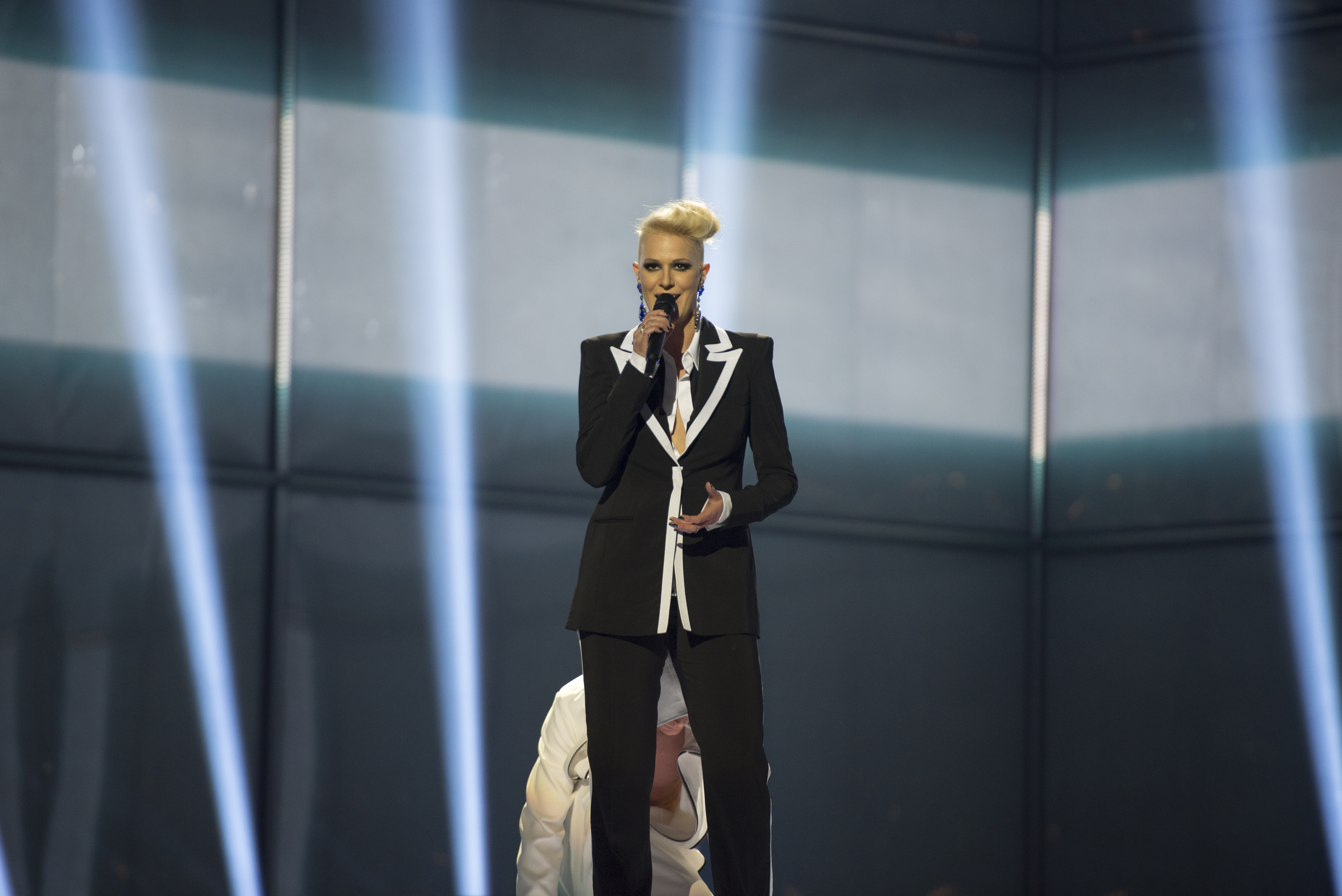
Tijana during a rehearsal before the second semi-final

Tijana took part in technical rehearsals on 30 April and 3 May, followed by dress rehearsals on 7 and 8 May. This included the jury show on 7 May where the professional juries of each country watched and voted on the competing entries.

The Macedonian performance featured Tijana performing choreography in a black and white trouser suit together with a dancer and three backing vocalists which moved towards her in the last part of the song. The background LED screens displayed moving white lines and raised hands with fingers pointing up which symbolised the title of the song, while the LED floor displayed concentric rectangles moving towards Tijana. In regards to the choreography which involved Tijana interacting with the dancer throughout the performance, the singer stated: "My sister is my half. My other half is my dancer. On stage, he does what I don't want to do and I do what he doesn’t want to. And we are having this interaction. And we love and hate with each other in the same time." The artistic director for the Macedonian performance was Boris Miljković. The dancer that joined Tijana on stage was Dejan Kolarov and the three backing vocalists were Tamara Todevska, Dimitar Andonovski and Nikola Perevski Pere. Tamara Todevska previously represented Macedonia in 2008.

At the end of the show, Macedonia was not announced among the top 10 entries in the second semi-final and therefore failed to qualify to compete in the final. It was later revealed that Macedonia placed thirteenth in the semi-final, receiving a total of 33 points.

=== Voting ===
Voting during the three shows consisted of 50 percent public televoting and 50 percent from a jury deliberation. The jury consisted of five music industry professionals who were citizens of the country they represent, with their names published before the contest to ensure transparency. This jury was asked to judge each contestant based on: vocal capacity; the stage performance; the song's composition and originality; and the overall impression by the act. In addition, no member of a national jury could be related in any way to any of the competing acts in such a way that they cannot vote impartially and independently. The individual rankings of each jury member were released shortly after the grand final. In the semi-final, Macedonia's vote was based on 100 percent jury voting due to either technical issues with the televoting or an insufficient number of valid votes cast during the televote period.

Following the release of the full split voting by the EBU after the conclusion of the competition, it was revealed that Macedonia had placed fourteenth with both the public televote and seventh with the jury vote in the second semi-final. In the public vote, Macedonia scored 26 points, while with the jury vote, Macedonia scored 70 points.

Below is a breakdown of points awarded to Macedonia and awarded by Macedonia in the second semi-final and grand final of the contest, and the breakdown of the jury voting and televoting conducted during the two shows:

==== Points awarded to Macedonia ====
Points awarded to Macedonia (Semi-final 2)
Score	Country
12 points	Slovenia
10 points	Switzerland
8 points	
7 points	
6 points	
5 points	
4 points	
3 points	Malta
2 points	Georgia; Israel; Italy
1 point	Belarus; Finland

==== Points awarded by Macedonia ====
Points awarded by Macedonia (Semi-final 2)
Score	Country
12 points	Malta
10 points	Finland
8 points	Romania
7 points	Ireland
6 points	Austria
5 points	Israel
4 points	Norway
3 points	Poland
2 points	Belarus
1 point	Switzerland

Points awarded by Macedonia (Final)
Score	Country
12 points	Montenegro
10 points	Hungary
8 points	Armenia
7 points	Netherlands
6 points	Russia
5 points	Poland
4 points	Romania
3 points	Austria
2 points	Italy
1 point	Slovenia

==== Detailed voting results ====
The following members comprised the Macedonian jury:

- Milanka Rašić (jury chairperson) – independent music/film producer
- Valentino Skenderovski – composer, arranger, sound engineer, music producer
- Ivan Bečković – music journalist
- Robert Bilbilov – composer, arranger, sound engineer, music producer
- Maja Trpčanovska-Markova – independent producer

Detailed voting results from Macedonia (Semi-final 2)
R/O	Country	M. Rašić	V. Skenderovski	I. Bečković	R. Bilbilov	M. Trpčanovska-Markova	Jury Rank	Points
01	Malta	3	3	2	3	3	1	12
02	Israel	9	5	5	11	1	6	5
03	Norway	2	6	12	2	10	7	4
04	Georgia	13	13	14	13	14	14	
05	Poland	5	14	6	5	4	8	3
06	Austria	4	9	4	6	5	5	6
07	Lithuania	14	11	8	12	7	11	
08	Finland	6	2	7	4	2	2	10
09	Ireland	8	4	1	7	8	4	7
10	Belarus	7	10	3	9	6	9	2
11	Macedonia							
12	Switzerland	12	8	9	10	13	10	1
13	Greece	11	12	13	8	11	13	
14	Slovenia	10	7	11	14	12	12	
15	Romania	1	1	10	1	9	3	8

Detailed voting results from Macedonia (Final)
R/O	Country	M. Rašić	V. Skenderovski	I. Bečković	R. Bilbilov	M. Trpčanovska-Markova	Jury Rank	Televote Rank	Combined Rank	Points
01	Ukraine	17	19	18	21	7	18	12	15	
02	Belarus	21	20	6	16	9	13	11	12	
03	Azerbaijan	12	22	17	9	17	16	26	23	
04	Iceland	22	5	24	22	22	22	21	24	
05	Norway	16	16	20	14	21	19	18	21	
06	Romania	3	4	5	15	5	3	14	7	4
07	Armenia	9	7	12	2	23	10	2	3	8
08	Montenegro	5	18	1	5	2	2	1	1	12
09	Poland	14	26	9	17	4	12	3	6	5
10	Greece	20	21	25	6	24	24	17	22	
11	Austria	18	25	16	4	11	14	5	8	3
12	Germany	19	6	23	23	10	17	19	20	
13	Sweden	23	13	22	12	19	21	7	13	
14	France	24	15	26	13	18	23	25	26	
15	Russia	8	3	11	11	8	5	9	5	6
16	Italy	4	9	13	10	3	4	16	9	2
17	Slovenia	10	8	14	24	20	15	6	10	1
18	Finland	15	1	10	25	12	11	20	16	
19	Spain	13	14	2	18	6	9	13	11	
20	Switzerland	26	24	7	26	26	26	4	14	
21	Hungary	1	2	4	1	1	1	10	2	10
22	Malta	6	17	3	8	13	7	24	18	
23	Denmark	7	12	15	3	14	8	23	17	
24	Netherlands	2	10	8	7	15	6	8	4	7
25	San Marino	25	11	21	20	25	25	22	25	
26	United Kingdom	11	23	19	19	16	20	15	19	
