= Italy in the Eurovision Song Contest 2014 =

- Eurovision Song Contest 2014
- Participating broadcaster: Radiotelevisione italiana (RAI)
- Country: Italy
- Selection process: Internal selection
- Announcement date: Artist: 22 January 2014; Song: 24 January 2014

Competing entry
- Song: "La mia città"
- Artist: Emma
- Songwriters: Emma Marrone

Placement
- Final result: 21st, 33 points

Participation chronology

Italy was represented at the Eurovision Song Contest 2014 with the song "La mia città", written and performed by Emma. The Italian participating broadcaster, Radiotelevisione italiana (RAI), internally selected its entry for the contest. The entry placed 21st in the final, scoring 33 points.

== Background ==
Prior to the 2014 contest, Radiotelevisione italiana (RAI) had participated in the Eurovision Song Contest representing Italy forty times since its first entry during the inaugural contest in 1956. Since then, it has won the contest on two occasions: in 1964 with the song "Non ho l'età" performed by Gigliola Cinquetti and in 1990 with the song "Insieme: 1992" performed by Toto Cutugno. RAI has withdrawn from the contest a number of times with its most recent absence spanning from 1998 until 2010. Its return in 2011 with the song "Madness of Love", performed by Raphael Gualazzi, placed second—their highest result, to this point, since their victory in 1990. It saw further success in 2012 and 2013, placing ninth and seventh, respectively.

As part of its duties as participating broadcaster, RAI organises the selection of its entry in the Eurovision Song Contest and broadcasts the event in the country. The broadcaster has previously organised national finals and internal selections to select its Eurovision entry. Between 2011 and 2013, RAI used the Sanremo Music Festival as an artist selection pool where a special committee would select one of the competing artist, independent of the results in the competition, as the Eurovision entrant. The selected entrant was then responsible for selecting the song they would compete with. This method was again used for 2014.

== Before Eurovision ==
=== Internal selection ===
On 22 January 2014, RAI announced that it had internally selected Emma Marrone to represent Italy in the Eurovision Song Contest 2014. On 24 January 2014, RAI revealed that Emma would perform "La mia città" at the contest.

== At Eurovision ==
Emma presenting herself at the contest

As a member of the "Big Five", Italy automatically qualified for a place in the final, held on 10 May 2014. In addition to their participation in the final, Italy was assigned to vote in the second semi-final on 8 May 2014. During the Italian delegation's press conference on 6 May 2014, Italy was allocated to compete in the second half of the final. In the final, the producers of the show decided that Italy would perform 16th, following Russia and preceding Slovenia.

Italy placed 21st in the final out of 26, scoring 33 points. This represented one of the lowest placements in Italy's Eurovision Song Contest history – its lowest ever by absolute finishing position, but not its lowest relative finish or score (having previously finished 17th and joint-last with 0 points in the 1966 contest with Domenico Modugno's "Dio, come ti amo").

On stage, Emma was joined by two guitarists, one keyboard player, one drummer and one backing vocalist, Arianna Mereu. The Italian performance is based on a concept of glam rock from the 70s combined with futuristic elements.

In Italy, the broadcast of the first and second semi-finals aired on Rai 4 with commentary by Marco Ardemagni and Filippo Solibello, while the final aired on Rai 2 with commentary by Linus and Nicola Savino. The Italian spokesperson revealing the result of the Italian vote in the final was Linus.

=== Voting ===
==== Points awarded to Italy ====
Points awarded to Italy (Final)
Score	Country
12 points	Malta
10 points	Albania
8 points	
7 points	
6 points	Montenegro
5 points	
4 points	
3 points	
2 points	Macedonia; Switzerland
1 point	France

==== Points awarded by Italy ====
Points awarded by Italy (Semi-final 2)
Score	Country
12 points	Austria
10 points	Poland
8 points	Finland
7 points	Slovenia
6 points	Greece
5 points	Malta
4 points	Romania
3 points	Switzerland
2 points	Macedonia
1 point	Lithuania

Points awarded by Italy (Final)
Score	Country
12 points	Austria
10 points	Ukraine
8 points	Poland
7 points	Iceland
6 points	Finland
5 points	Romania
4 points	Netherlands
3 points	Greece
2 points	Switzerland
1 point	Malta

==== Detailed voting results ====
The following members comprised the Italian jury:

- Luca de Gennaro (jury chairperson) – Vice president Talent & Music of MTV Italy
- Andrea Laffranchi – journalist
- Paola Folli – singer
- Andrea Mirò – songwriter, composer, musician
- Francesco Pasquero – music manager

Detailed voting results from Italy (Semi-final 2)
R/O	Country	L. de Gennaro	A. Laffranchi	P. Folli	A. Mirò	F. Pasquero	Jury Rank	Televote Rank	Combined Rank	Points	Percentage(Televote)
01	Malta	2	2	4	4	1	2	11	6	5	2.28%
02	Israel	8	5	11	12	11	10	9	12		3.15%
03	Norway	10	8	6	14	10	11	14	13		1.60%
04	Georgia	11	11	2	1	9	5	13	11		1.76%
05	Poland	4	7	15	11	2	6	3	2	10	9.14%
06	Austria	3	3	3	2	5	3	2	1	12	10.68%
07	Lithuania	7	10	7	3	13	7	10	10	1	2.60%
08	Finland	1	1	1	5	3	1	8	3	8	3.23%
09	Ireland	15	15	13	15	14	15	15	15		1.53%
10	Belarus	13	13	14	13	15	14	12	14		2.17%
11	Macedonia	6	6	12	10	12	9	7	9	2	3.39%
12	Switzerland	14	12	8	6	8	12	4	8	3	8.09%
13	Greece	9	9	10	9	6	8	5	5	6	5.00%
14	Slovenia	5	4	5	7	4	4	6	4	7	3.69%
15	Romania	12	14	9	8	7	13	1	7	4	41.69%

Detailed voting results from Italy (Final)
R/O	Country	L. de Gennaro	A. Laffranchi	P. Folli	A. Mirò	F. Pasquero	Jury Rank	Televote Rank	Combined Rank	Points	Percentage(Televote)
01	Ukraine	8	6	5	5	3	4	4	2	10	6.33%
02	Belarus	13	21	15	13	19	19	20	23		1.22%
03	Azerbaijan	14	20	16	12	17	18	25	24		0.34%
04	Iceland	4	2	2	4	2	2	10	4	7	2.55%
05	Norway	20	12	10	16	14	12	19	16		1.30%
06	Romania	22	25	8	14	4	13	1	6	5	32.53%
07	Armenia	19	19	24	24	18	24	7	14		3.43%
08	Montenegro	11	10	18	10	25	14	21	20		1.13%
09	Poland	9	4	21	9	1	6	3	3	8	7.59%
10	Greece	18	13	14	7	13	11	8	8	3	3.13%
11	Austria	2	3	3	3	6	3	2	1	12	9.98%
12	Germany	17	16	12	6	12	10	22	17		1.03%
13	Sweden	12	14	9	23	20	17	13	12		2.14%
14	France	25	15	23	15	24	23	24	25		0.96%
15	Russia	10	17	20	18	23	20	11	15		2.36%
16	Italy										
17	Slovenia	7	7	4	19	9	7	18	11		1.45%
18	Finland	1	1	1	2	5	1	12	5	6	2.34%
19	Spain	15	22	19	21	16	21	15	21		1.91%
20	Switzerland	24	11	17	11	11	15	5	9	2	5.82%
21	Hungary	5	18	11	20	21	16	17	19		1.61%
22	Malta	23	5	7	8	8	8	14	10	1	2.03%
23	Denmark	3	8	22	17	7	9	23	18		0.98%
24	Netherlands	6	9	6	1	10	5	9	7	4	2.57%
25	San Marino	21	23	25	25	15	25	6	13		3.56%
26	United Kingdom	16	24	13	22	22	22	16	22		1.71%
