= Mei Finegold =

Israeli singer

Mei Finegold מיי פיינגולד
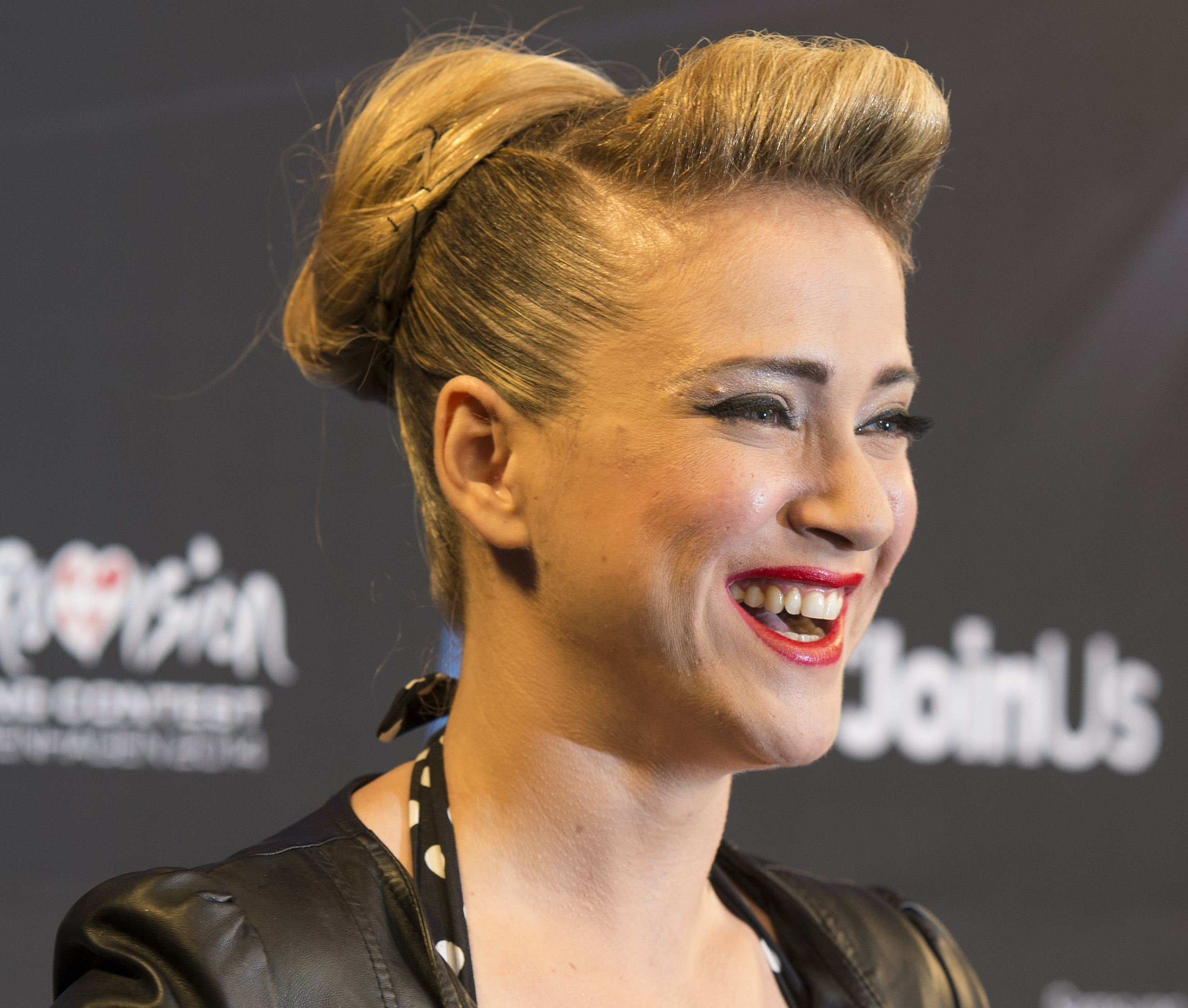
- Mei Finegold (2014)

Background information
- Born: Meital Slonimsky; 16 December 1982 (age 43); Rishon LeZion, Israel
- Genres: Soft rock, pop, alternative rock
- Occupation: Singer
- Years active: 2009–present
- Label: Helicon

Meital Slominsky (Hebrew: מיטל סלונימסקי; born 16 December 1982), known by her stage name Mei Finegold (Hebrew: מיי פיינגולד), also credited as Mei Feingold, is an Israeli singer. Her third-place finish in Kokhav Nolad 7, Israel's version of Pop Idol, launched her career in 2009. Finegold represented Israel in the Eurovision Song Contest 2014.

== Early life ==
Finegold was born in 1982 in Rishon LeZion, where she still lives today. Her musical career started in school ceremonies, and she continued by taking singing lessons and learning to sing classical songs. Since her childhood, Finegold used to throw many shows, including nightclubs and bars. Since then, Finegold became the lead singer of a band called Disiac. The band participated in Hebrew labor, a special CD containing covers of old Israeli songs.

== Kokhav Nolad ==
Finegold's place in the show was promised since her first audition. The judges were charmed by her and not even a single piece of criticism was given to Finegold.

During the show Finegold kept on the rock line, covering songs mainly from Israel's mid-1980s. She was awarded the performance of the week for five times, two of them in a row. Finegold's performances were as follows:

Performances and results on Kokhav Nolad
Week	Number	Original Performer	Additional information
Week 1 (29 June)	"Ale baru'akh" (Leaf in the wind)	Gabi Shushan	Best performance
Week 2 (5 July)	"Boogy iti halayla" (Boogy with me tonight)	Gary Eckstein	
Week 3 (12 July)	"Achinoam lo yodaat" (Achinoam doesn't know)	Arik Einstein	Duet with Daniel Tavori.
Week 3 (12 July)	"Nag'a bashamayim" (Touched the sky)	Mashina	Rescue solo. Safe.
Week 3 (13 July)	"Emor Shalom" (Say hello)	Chocolate, Menta, Mastik	Ehud Manor special.
Week 4 (19 July)	"Femme fatale"	Yuval Banai (org. version Velvet Underground)	Duet with Roni Daloomi.
Week 4 (20 July)	"Seder yom" (Daily schedule)	Lahaka Retorit	Best performance.
Week 5 (26 July)	"Red me'al masakh hatelevizia sheli" (Get off my TV screen)	Rami Fortis	Duet with Hovi Sekulets.
Week 5 (27 July)	"She'eriot shel hakhayim" (Life's leftovers)	The Idan Raichel Project	Best performance.
Week 6 (4 August)	"Metukim" (Sweeties)	Shlomi Shabat	
Week 6 (4 August)	"Tamid Isha" (Always a Woman)	Pnina Rosenblum	
Week 7 (11 August)	"En Od Yom" (There's No Other Day)	Gidi Gov	Best performance.
Week 7 (11 August)	"Ella" (Ella/Goddess)	HaYehudim	
Week 8 (18 August)	"VeDavid Yafe Einaim" (And David has beautiful eyes)	Duet with Roni Daloomi	
Week 8 (18 August)	"HaLayla Levad" (Tonight Alone)	Duet with Re'em Cohen	
Week 8 (18 August)	"Hofshia" (Free)	Sarit Hadad	
Week 8 (19 August)	"Mexico"	Aviv Geffen	
Week 8 (19 August)	"Sof Haolam" (The End of the World)	Aviv Geffen	Best Performance
Week 9 – Semi-final (26 August)	"BaGilgul Haze" (In this age)	Shalom Hanoch	
Week 9 – Semi-final (26 August)	"Hallellujah"	Leonard Cohen	
Week 10 – Final (30 August)	"Tahzor, Tahzor" (Come Back, Come Back)	Mashina	
Week 10 – Final (30 August)	"Ta'am Menta" (Menta Taste)	Original composition	

== Eurovision Song Contest 2014 ==
Mei Finegold presenting herself (2014).

In January, it was revealed that Finegold had been internally selected by the Israeli broadcaster, IBA, to represent Israel in the Eurovision Song Contest 2014 to be held in Copenhagen, Denmark. It was announced on 5 March, that she would sing "Same Heart" for Israel. Finegold competed in the second semi-final of the competition, placing 14th and scoring 19 points, ultimately failing to qualify to the final.

Awards and achievements
Preceded by Moran Mazor with "Rak bishvilo"	Israel in the Eurovision Song Contest; 2014	Succeeded by Nadav Guedj with "Golden Boy"
