= Finland in the Eurovision Song Contest 2014 =

- Eurovision Song Contest 2014
- Participating broadcaster: Yleisradio (Yle)
- Country: Finland
- Selection process: Uuden Musiikin Kilpailu 2014
- Selection date: 1 February 2014

Competing entry
- Song: "Something Better"
- Artist: Softengine
- Songwriters: Topi Latukka; Henri Oskár

Placement
- Semi-final result: Qualified (3rd, 97 points)
- Final result: 11th, 72 points

Participation chronology

Finland was represented at the Eurovision Song Contest 2014 with the song "Something Better", written by Topi Latukka and Henri Oskár, and performed by the band Softengine. The Finnish participating broadcaster, Yleisradio (Yle), organised the national final Uuden Musiikin Kilpailu 2014 in order to select its entry for the contest. 12 entries were selected to compete in the national final, which consisted of two heats, a semi-final and a final, taking place in January and February 2014. Eight entries ultimately competed in the final on 1 February where the 50/50 combination of votes from a four-member judging panel and votes from the public selected "Something Better" performed by Softengine as the winner.

Finland was drawn to compete in the second semi-final of the Eurovision Song Contest which took place on 8 May 2014. Performing during the show in position 8, "Something Better" was announced among the top 10 entries of the second semi-final and therefore qualified to compete in the final on 10 May. It was later revealed that Finland placed third out of the 15 participating countries in the semi-final with 97 points. In the final, Finland performed in position 18 and placed eleventh out of the 26 participating countries, scoring 72 points.

== Background ==
Prior to the 2014 contest, Yleisradio (Yle) had participated in the Eurovision Song Contest representing Finland forty-seven times since its first entry in 1961. It has won the contest once in 2006 with the song "Hard Rock Hallelujah" performed by Lordi. In 2013, "Marry Me" performed by Krista Siegfrids managed to qualify to the final and placed twenty-fourth.

As part of its duties as participating broadcaster, Yle organises the selection of its entry in the Eurovision Song Contest and broadcasts the event in the country. The broadcaster confirmed its intentions to participate at the 2014 contest on 10 July 2013. Yle had selected its entries for the contest through national final competitions that have varied in format over the years. Since 1961, a selection show that was often titled Euroviisukarsinta highlighted that the purpose of the program was to select a song for Eurovision. However, since 2012, the broadcaster has organised the selection show Uuden Musiikin Kilpailu (UMK), which focuses on showcasing new music with the winning song being selected as the Finnish entry for that year. Along with its participation confirmation, the broadcaster also announced that its entry for the 2014 contest would be selected through Uuden Musiikin Kilpailu 2014.

== Before Eurovision ==
=== Uuden Musiikin Kilpailu 2014 ===
Uuden Musiikin Kilpailu 2014 was the third edition of Uuden Musiikin Kilpailu (UMK), the music competition that selects Finland's entries for the Eurovision Song Contest. The competition consisted of four shows that commenced with the first of two heats on 11 January 2014, followed by a semi-final on 25 January 2014 and concluded with a final on 1 February 2014. The four shows were hosted by YleX DJs Anne Lainto and Ile Uusivuori. All shows were broadcast on Yle TV2, Yle Fem with commentary in Swedish and online at yle.fi/umk. The final was also broadcast online at the official Eurovision Song Contest website eurovision.tv as well as via radio on YleX, Yle Radio Suomi and with commentary in Swedish on Yle X3M and Yle Radio Vega.

==== Format ====
The format of the competition consisted of four shows: two heats, a semi-final and a final. Six songs competed in each heat and one entry from each heat qualified directly to the final, while the entries placed second to fifth qualified to the semi-final. Eight songs competed in the semi-final and the top six entries from the semi-final qualified to complete the eight-song lineup in the final. The results for the heats and the final were determined by the 50/50 combination of public voting and a four-member judging panel, while the results for the semi-final were determined exclusively by a public vote. Each judge assigned scores to each entry ranging from 1 (lowest score) to 10 (highest score) in the heats and points from 3 (lowest) to 10 (highest) in the final, while public voting included the options of telephone, SMS and online voting. Prior to the final, the public was able to vote in advance starting on 27 January 2014.

The judging panel participated in each show by providing feedback to the competing artists and selecting entries to qualify in the competition. The panel consisted of:

- Toni Wirtanen – Heavy metal singer and leader of the band Apulanta
- Aija Puurtinen – Singer and music professor
- Tomi Saarinen – Head of Music at YleX
- Redrama – Rapper

==== Competing entries ====
A submission period was opened by Yle which lasted between 10 July 2013 and 16 September 2013. At least one of the writers and the lead singer(s) had to hold Finnish citizenship or live in Finland permanently in order for the entry to qualify to compete. A panel of experts appointed by Yle selected twelve entries for the competition from the 420 received submissions and 30-second clips of the competing entries were presented during a live streamed press conference on 10 December 2013. The competing entries were also presented over three pre-recorded televised preview programmes between 26 December 2013 and 4 January 2014, where the competing artists performed demo versions of their entries in front of the four judges. The judges provided feedback and suggestions to the artists on the final versions of their entries during the shows, which were presented during a special radio broadcast on Yle Radio Suomi on 1 January 2014, hosted by Harri Hakanen and Anssi Autio.

Artist	Song	Songwriter(s)
Clarissa feat. Josh Standing	"Top of the World"	Paul Oxley, David Neisser, Christian Rabb, Annette Lundell, Joshua Standing
Dennis Fagerström	"My Little Honey Bee"	Dennis Fagerström, Michael James Down, Niklas Hast, Andreas Anastasiou, Primož Poglajen
Hanna Sky	"Hope"	Hanna Sky
Hukka ja Mama	"Selja"	Lasse Hukka
Jasmin Michaela	"Kertakäyttösydän"	Mikko Kierikki, Jasmin Michaela, Jutta Annala, Johanna Viksten
Lauri Mikkola	"Going Down"	Lauri Mikkola
Lili Lambert	"Let Me Take You There"	Lili Lambert, Joonas Kaikko, Lasse Piirainen
MadCraft	"Shining Bright"	Tom Nuorivaara, Juho Rinne, Jesse Mäläskä, Otto Uotila
Makea	"Painovoima"	Makea
Miau	"God/Drug"	Anu Kaukola, Henna Juvonen
Mikko Pohjola	"Sängyn reunalla"	Mikko Pohjola
Softengine	"Something Better"	Topi Latukka, Henri Oskár

==== Shows ====
===== Heats =====
Two heats took place on 11 and 18 January 2014 at the Peacock Theatre in Helsinki. In each heat six entries participated, with one entry qualifying directly to the final based on a 50/50 combination of public votes and judges' votes, and an additional four entries progressing to the semi-final.

Heat 1 – 11 January 2014
R/O	Artist	Song	Jury Votes					Result
R/O	Artist	Song	T. Wirtanen	A. Puurtinen	T. Saarinen	Redrama	Total	Result
1	Miau	"God/Drug"	6	7	6	4	23	Semi-final
2	Dennis Fagerström	"My Little Honey Bee"	4	5	5	5	19	Semi-final
3	Lili Lambert	"Let Me Take You There"	3	6	3	6	18	—N/a
4	Hukka ja Mama	"Selja"	10	9	8	8	35	Semi-final
5	Softengine	"Something Better"	8	10	9	9	36	Final
6	Jasmin Michaela	"Kertakäyttösydän"	7	8	7	7	29	Semi-final

Heat 2 – 18 January 2014
R/O	Artist	Song	Jury Votes					Result
R/O	Artist	Song	T. Wirtanen	A. Puurtinen	T. Saarinen	Redrama	Total	Result
1	Makea	"Painovoima"	4	7	4	5	20	—N/a
2	Lauri Mikkola	"Going Down"	5	8	7	6	26	Semi-final
3	Clarissa feat. Josh Standing	"Top of the World"	6	6	6	7	25	Semi-final
4	Mikko Pohjola	"Sängyn reunalla"	8	9	8	9	34	Semi-final
5	MadCraft	"Shining Bright"	7	5	5	4	21	Semi-final
6	Hanna Sky	"Hope"	9	10	9	10	38	Final

===== Semi-final =====
The semi-final show took place on 25 January 2014 at the Peacock Theatre in Helsinki and the top six from the eight competing entries qualified to the final based on the results from the public vote. "Kertakäyttösydän" performed by Jasmin Michaela and "My Little Honey Bee" performed by Dennis Fagerström were both eliminated from the competition. In addition to the performances of the competing entries, Brädi performed his song "Hätähuuto" together with Toni Wirtanen as the interval act.

Semi-final – 25 January 2014
R/O	Artist	Song	Result
1	MadCraft	"Shining Bright"	Advanced
2	Hukka ja Mama	"Selja"	Advanced
3	Lauri Mikkola	"Going Down"	Advanced
4	Jasmin Michaela	"Kertakäyttösydän"	—N/a
5	Dennis Fagerström	"My Little Honey Bee"	—N/a
6	Miau	"God/Drug"	Advanced
7	Mikko Pohjola	"Sängyn reunalla"	Advanced
8	Clarissa feat. Josh Standing	"Top of the World"	Advanced

===== Final =====
The final took place on 1 February 2014 at the Barona Areena in Espoo where the eight entries that qualified from the preceding three shows competed. "Something Better" performed by Softengine was selected as the winner by a 50/50 combination of public votes and judges' votes. Rather than assigning scores to each entry as in the heats, each judge assigned points from 3 (lowest) to 10 (highest). The viewer vote was based on the percentage of votes each song achieved through the following voting methods: telephone, SMS and online voting. In addition to the performances of the competing entries, the interval acts featured Redrama and 2013 Finnish Eurovision entrant Krista Siegfrids performing her song "Cinderella".

Final – 1 February 2014
R/O	Artist	Song	Jury	Televote	Total	Place
1	Softengine	"Something Better"	18.27%	28.28%	23.28%	1
2	Hanna Sky	"Hope"	9.13%	—	—	—
3	Miau	"God/Drug"	15.38%	13.94%	14.66%	3
4	Lauri Mikkola	"Going Down"	11.06%	—	—	—
5	MadCraft	"Shining Bright"	6.25%	—	—	—
6	Mikko Pohjola	"Sängyn reunalla"	16.83%	19.48%	18.16%	2
7	Clarissa feat. Josh Standing	"Top of the World"	9.62%	—	—	—
8	Hukka ja Mama	"Selja"	13.46%	—	—	—

Detailed Jury Votes
R/O	Song	T. Wirtanen	A. Puurtinen	T. Saarinen	Redrama	Total	Percentage
1	"Something Better"	8	10	10	10	38	18.27%
2	"Hope"	3	7	4	5	19	9.13%
3	"God/Drug"	10	9	7	6	32	15.38%
4	"Going Down"	5	6	5	7	23	11.06%
5	"Shining Bright"	4	3	3	3	13	6.25%
6	"Sängyn reunalla"	9	8	9	9	35	16.83%
7	"Top of the World"	6	4	6	4	20	9.62%
8	"Selja"	7	5	8	8	28	13.46%

== At Eurovision ==
Softengine presenting themselves and Something Better at the Eurovision Song Contest 2014

According to Eurovision rules, all nations with the exceptions of the host country and the "Big Five" (France, Germany, Italy, Spain and the United Kingdom) are required to qualify from one of two semi-finals in order to compete for the final; the top ten countries from each semi-final progress to the final. The European Broadcasting Union (EBU) split up the competing countries into six different pots based on voting patterns from previous contests, with countries with favourable voting histories put into the same pot. On 20 January 2014, a special allocation draw was held which placed each country into one of the two semi-finals, as well as which half of the show they would perform in. Finland was placed into the second semi-final, held on 8 May 2014, and was scheduled to perform in the second half of the show.

Once all the competing songs for the 2014 contest had been released, the running order for the semi-finals was decided by the shows' producers rather than through another draw, so that similar songs were not placed next to each other. Finland was set to perform in position 8, following the entry from Lithuania and before the entry from Ireland.

The two semi-finals and the final were televised in Finland on Yle TV2 with a second audio program providing commentary in Finnish by Jorma Hietamäki and Sanna Pirkkalainen and in Swedish by Eva Frantz and Johan Lindroos. The three shows were broadcast via radio on Yle Radio Suomi and with Swedish commentary on Yle Radio Vega. The Finnish spokesperson, who announced the Finnish votes during the final, was Redrama.

=== Semi-final ===
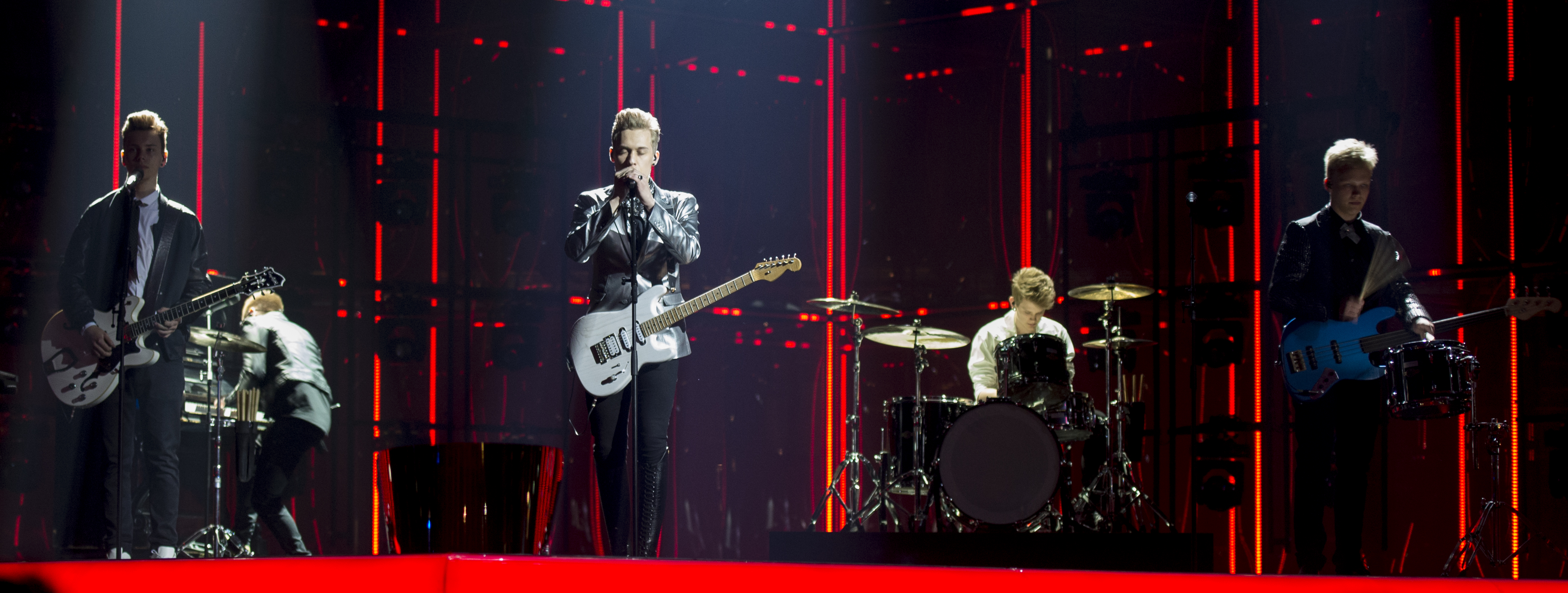
Softengine during a rehearsal before the second semi-final

Softengine took part in technical rehearsals on 30 April and 3 May, followed by dress rehearsals on 7 and 8 May. This included the jury show on 7 May where the professional juries of each country watched and voted on the competing entries.

The Finnish performance featured the members of Softengine performing in a band set-up that includes three guitars, a piano and drum kit. The members were mainly in black outfits, with lead singer Topi Latukka wearing a silver grey jacket and drummer Tuomo Alarinta wearing a white jacket. The stage floor and the cube transitioned between red and white lighting and included strobe light and spotlight effects.

At the end of the show, Finland was announced as having finished in the top 10 and subsequently qualifying for the grand final. It was later revealed that Finland placed third in the semi-final, receiving a total of 97 points.

=== Final ===
Shortly after the second semi-final, a winners' press conference was held for the ten qualifying countries. As part of this press conference, the qualifying artists took part in a draw to determine which half of the grand final they would subsequently participate in. This draw was done in the order the countries were announced during the semi-final. Finland was drawn to compete in the second half. Following this draw, the shows' producers decided upon the running order of the final, as they had done for the semi-finals. Finland was subsequently placed to perform in position 18, following the entry from Slovenia and before the entry from Spain.

Softengine once again took part in dress rehearsals on 9 and 10 May before the final, including the jury final where the professional juries cast their final votes before the live show. Softengine performed a repeat of their semi-final performance during the final on 10 May. Finland placed eleventh in the final, scoring 72 points.

=== Voting ===
Voting during the three shows consisted of 50 percent public televoting and 50 percent from a jury deliberation. The jury consisted of five music industry professionals who were citizens of the country they represent, with their names published before the contest to ensure transparency. This jury was asked to judge each contestant based on: vocal capacity; the stage performance; the song's composition and originality; and the overall impression by the act. In addition, no member of a national jury could be related in any way to any of the competing acts in such a way that they cannot vote impartially and independently. The individual rankings of each jury member were released shortly after the grand final.

Following the release of the full split voting by the EBU after the conclusion of the competition, it was revealed that Finland had placed seventh with the public televote and second with the jury vote in the second semi-final. In the public vote, Finland scored 83 points, while with the jury vote, Finland scored 117 points. In the final, Finland placed seventeenth with the public televote with 39 points and seventh with the jury vote, scoring 114 points.

Below is a breakdown of points awarded to Finland and awarded by Finland in the second semi-final and grand final of the contest, and the breakdown of the jury voting and televoting conducted during the two shows:

==== Points awarded to Finland ====
Points awarded to Finland (Semi-final 2)
Score	Country
12 points	Norway
10 points	Ireland; Macedonia
8 points	Austria; Italy; Poland; Switzerland; United Kingdom
7 points	
6 points	
5 points	Germany; Lithuania; Romania
4 points	Greece
3 points	Israel
2 points	Slovenia
1 point	Georgia

Points awarded to Finland (Final)
Score	Country
12 points	
10 points	
8 points	
7 points	Norway
6 points	Estonia; Hungary; Italy; Sweden; United Kingdom
5 points	Iceland
4 points	Austria; Denmark; Germany; Switzerland
3 points	Belgium; Latvia; Poland; San Marino
2 points	Netherlands
1 point	

==== Points awarded by Finland ====
Points awarded by Finland (Semi-final 2)
Score	Country
12 points	Austria
10 points	Norway
8 points	Switzerland
7 points	Belarus
6 points	Romania
5 points	Malta
4 points	Greece
3 points	Israel
2 points	Slovenia
1 point	Macedonia

Points awarded by Finland (Final)
Score	Country
12 points	Austria
10 points	Sweden
8 points	Netherlands
7 points	Norway
6 points	Denmark
5 points	Hungary
4 points	Armenia
3 points	Malta
2 points	Ukraine
1 point	France

==== Detailed voting results ====
The following members comprised the Finnish jury:

- Kaija Kärkinen (jury chairperson) – artist, composer, represented Finland in the 1991 contest
- Saara Törmä – lyricist
- Rauli Eskolin – producer
- Jaako Hurme – radio DJ
- Annette Lundell (Clarissa) – artist

Detailed voting results from Finland (Semi-final 2)
R/O	Country	K. Kärkinen	S. Törmä	R. Eskolin	J. Hurme	Clarissa	Jury Rank	Televote Rank	Combined Rank	Points
01	Malta	3	3	6	3	5	3	11	6	5
02	Israel	12	13	4	11	6	10	5	8	3
03	Norway	2	2	7	4	3	2	2	2	10
04	Georgia	8	7	2	14	14	8	12	11	
05	Poland	14	14	11	9	10	14	7	12	
06	Austria	1	1	1	1	2	1	1	1	12
07	Lithuania	11	11	14	5	4	9	13	14	
08	Finland									
09	Ireland	9	12	13	13	7	13	9	13	
10	Belarus	6	8	8	7	13	7	6	4	7
11	Macedonia	7	6	5	2	12	5	14	10	1
12	Switzerland	5	4	9	8	9	6	4	3	8
13	Greece	13	9	12	6	11	12	3	7	4
14	Slovenia	10	10	10	12	8	11	8	9	2
15	Romania	4	5	3	10	1	4	10	5	6

Detailed voting results from Finland (Final)
R/O	Country	K. Kärkinen	S. Törmä	R. Eskolin	J. Hurme	Clarissa	Jury Rank	Televote Rank	Combined Rank	Points
01	Ukraine	20	12	20	22	14	18	7	9	2
02	Belarus	12	18	23	16	19	19	15	19	
03	Azerbaijan	10	2	11	11	13	8	24	16	
04	Iceland	19	10	7	6	18	14	12	12	
05	Norway	2	6	12	12	10	6	4	4	7
06	Romania	13	14	19	23	7	16	21	21	
07	Armenia	9	20	16	5	5	12	6	7	4
08	Montenegro	21	21	21	25	25	25	25	25	
09	Poland	25	25	24	17	20	24	11	20	
10	Greece	23	17	25	15	17	21	13	18	
11	Austria	1	1	1	1	1	1	1	1	12
12	Germany	8	11	9	19	23	15	23	22	
13	Sweden	4	9	3	7	3	2	2	2	10
14	France	7	7	13	13	12	11	14	10	1
15	Russia	24	24	15	20	22	22	8	15	
16	Italy	6	3	10	21	16	13	20	17	
17	Slovenia	18	22	22	18	15	20	19	23	
18	Finland									
19	Spain	17	19	2	9	2	9	16	11	
20	Switzerland	15	15	14	14	21	17	10	13	
21	Hungary	14	13	4	10	8	10	5	6	5
22	Malta	3	5	6	8	9	3	17	8	3
23	Denmark	11	4	18	2	6	5	9	5	6
24	Netherlands	5	8	8	3	11	4	3	3	8
25	San Marino	22	23	17	24	24	23	18	24	
26	United Kingdom	16	16	5	4	4	7	22	14	
