= Poland in the Eurovision Song Contest 2014 =

- Eurovision Song Contest 2014
- Participating broadcaster: Telewizja Polska (TVP)
- Country: Poland
- Selection process: Internal selection
- Announcement date: 25 February 2014

Competing entry
- Song: "My Słowianie – We Are Slavic"
- Artist: Donatan and Cleo
- Songwriters: Witold Czamara; Joanna Klepko

Placement
- Semi-final result: Qualified (8th, 70 points)
- Final result: 14th, 62 points

Participation chronology

Poland was represented at the Eurovision Song Contest 2014 with the song "My Słowianie – We Are Slavic" written and performed by Donatan and Cleo. In December 2013, the Polish broadcaster Telewizja Polska (TVP) announced that it would be returning the Eurovision Song Contest after a two-year absence, and that the Polish entry for the 2014 contest in Copenhagen, Denmark would be selected through an internal selection. "My Słowianie – We Are Slavic" performed by Donatan and Cleo was announced as the Polish entry on 25 February 2014 during the TVP1 programme Świat się kręci, while the song was presented to the public on 18 March 2014.

Poland was drawn to compete in the second semi-final of the Eurovision Song Contest which took place on 8 May 2014. Performing during the show in position 5, "My Słowianie – We Are Slavic" was announced among the top 10 entries of the second semi-final and therefore qualified to compete in the final on 10 May. It was later revealed that Poland placed eighth out of the 15 participating countries in the semi-final with 70 points. In the final, Poland performed in position 9 and placed fourteenth out of the 26 participating countries, scoring 62 points.

== Background ==
Prior to the 2014 contest, Poland had participated in the Eurovision Song Contest sixteen times since its first entry in 1994. Poland's highest placement in the contest, to this point, has been second place, which the nation achieved with its debut entry in 1994 with the song "To nie ja!" performed by Edyta Górniak. Poland has only, thus far, reached the top ten on one other occasion, when Ich Troje performing the song "Keine Grenzen – Żadnych granic" finished seventh in 2003. Between 2005 and 2011, Poland failed to qualify from the semi-final round six out of seven years with only their 2008 entry, "For Life" performed by Isis Gee, managing to take the nation to the final during that period. After once again failing to qualify to the final in 2011 with their entry "Jestem" performed by Magdalena Tul, the country withdrew from the contest during 2012 and 2013 citing reasons such as to focus on the 2012 UEFA European Football Championship (which Poland co-hosted with Ukraine) and the 2012 Summer Olympics, as well as the contest lacking focus on music and the presence of voting among neighbouring countries behind the decision.

The Polish national broadcaster, Telewizja Polska (TVP), broadcasts the event within Poland and organises the selection process for the nation's entry. Following a two-year absence, TVP confirmed Poland's participation in the 2014 Eurovision Song Contest on 5 December 2013 after being motivated by a reduction in participation fees by the European Broadcasting Union. Between 2006 and 2011, TVP organised televised national finals that featured a competition among several artists and songs in order to select the Polish entry for the Eurovision Song Contest. For the 2014 Eurovision Song Contest, TVP opted to internally select the Polish entry.

== Before Eurovision ==
=== Internal selection ===
TVP announced in January 2014 that the Polish entry for the 2014 Eurovision Song Contest would be selected via an internal selection and would be presented in February 2014. The six-member selection committee that selected the Polish entry consisted of Mikołaj Dobrowolski (Head of Delegation for Poland at the Eurovision Song Contest), Maria Szabłowska (music journalist at TVP and Polish Radio), Artur Orzech (Eurovision commentator, radio and television journalist and presenter), Krzysztof Szewczyk (journalist), Marek Sierocki (music journalist) and Paweł Sztompke (journalist, music critic and editorial director of music at Polish Radio), and OGAE Poland was also involved in the selection process.

On 20 February 2014 during the TVP1 programme Świat się kręci, hosted by Agata Młynarska, it was announced that Donatan and Cleo would represent Poland at the Eurovision Song Contest 2014 with the song "My Słowianie", written by Donatan and Cleo themselves. In the months prior to the selection announcement, the duo were heavily rumoured on social media to represent Poland after they attended a meeting with TVP regarding the 2014 contest. Among the other artists considered by TVP before Donatan and Cleo were selected included Doda, Margaret and Marina Łuczenko. The Polish language version of the song, titled "My Słowianie" and released in November 2013, previously received media exposure for its music video which mocks Polish stereotypes. "My Słowianie" was edited for the Eurovision Song Contest since the song exceeded three minutes, and featured additional lyrics in English. The bilingual version, titled "My Słowianie – We Are Slavic", was released on 18 March 2014 via the official Eurovision Song Contest's YouTube channel.

=== Promotion ===
Donatan and Cleo made several appearances across Europe to specifically promote "My Słowianie – We Are Slavic" as the Polish Eurovision entry. On 29 March, Donatan and Cleo performed during the Eurovision PreParty Riga, which was organised by OGAE Latvia and held at the Andalūzijas Suns in Riga, Latvia. On 13 April, Donatan and Cleo performed during the London Eurovision Party, which was held at the Café de Paris venue in London, United Kingdom and hosted by Nicki French and Paddy O'Connell.

== At Eurovision ==
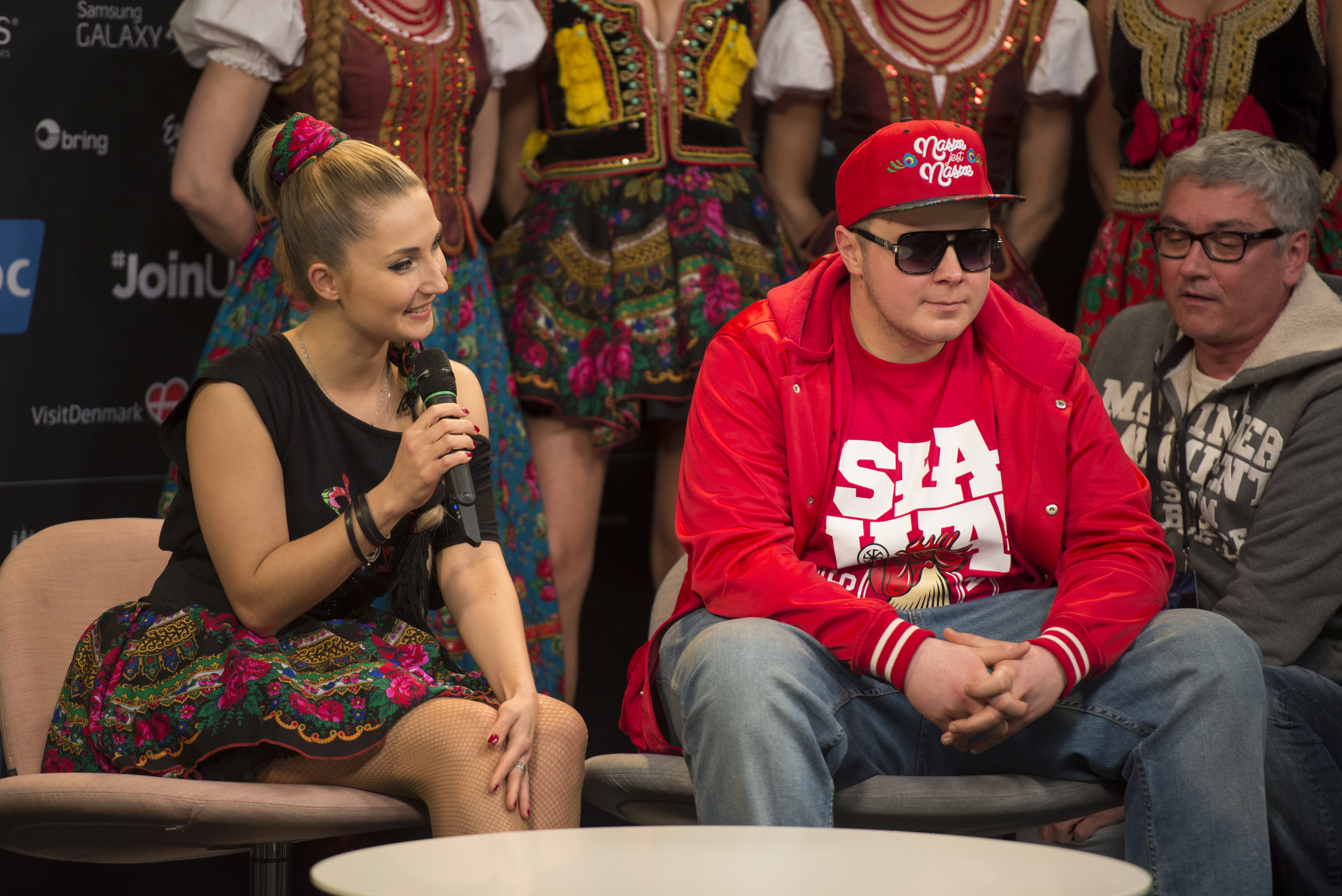
Donatan and Cleo during a press meet and greet

According to Eurovision rules, all nations with the exceptions of the host country and the "Big Five" (France, Germany, Italy, Spain and the United Kingdom) are required to qualify from one of two semi-finals in order to compete for the final; the top ten countries from each semi-final progress to the final. The European Broadcasting Union (EBU) split up the competing countries into six different pots based on voting patterns from previous contests, with countries with favourable voting histories put into the same pot. On 20 January 2014, a special allocation draw was held which placed each country into one of the two semi-finals, as well as which half of the show they would perform in. Poland was placed into the second semi-final, to be held on 8 May 2014, and was scheduled to perform in the first half of the show.

Once all the competing songs for the 2014 contest had been released, the running order for the semi-finals was decided by the shows' producers rather than through another draw, so that similar songs were not placed next to each other. Poland was set to perform in position 5, following the entry from Georgia and before the entry from Austria.

The two semi-finals and the final were broadcast in Poland on TVP1, TVP1 HD and TVP Polonia with commentary by Artur Orzech. The three shows also aired on a one-day delay on TVP Rozrywka. The Polish spokesperson, who announced the Polish votes during the final, was Paulina Chylewska.

=== Semi-final ===
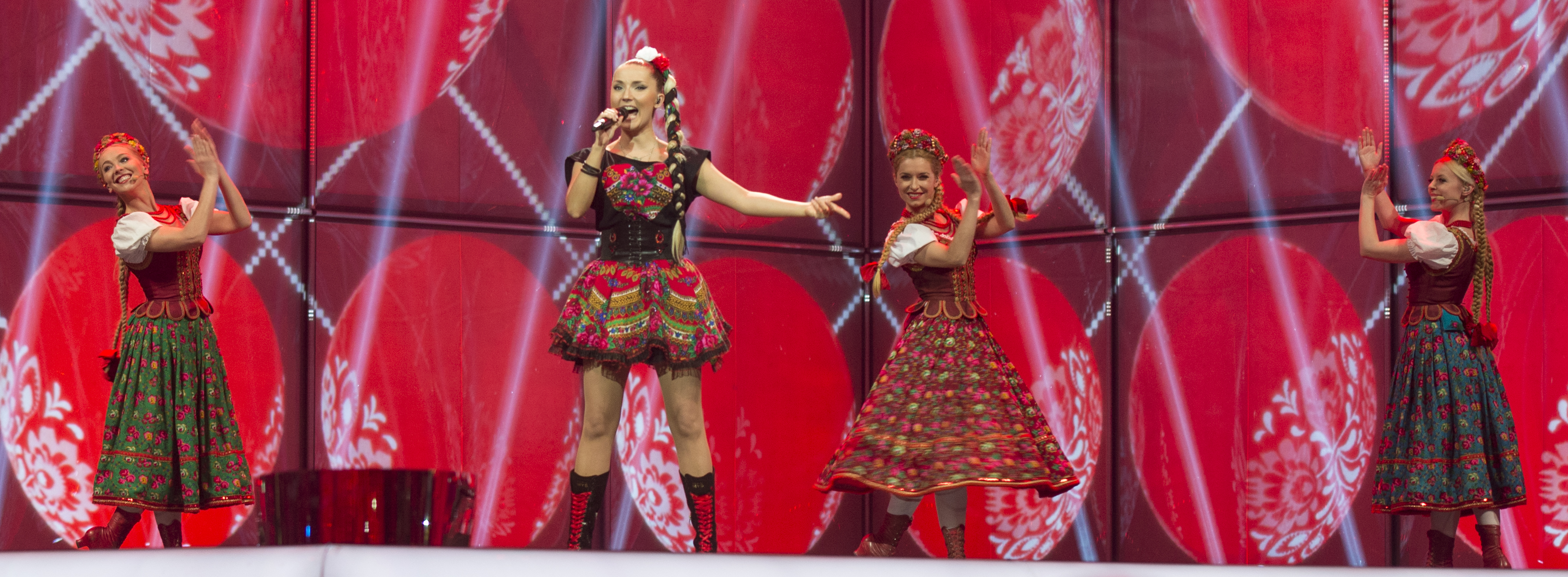
Cleo during a rehearsal before the second semi-final

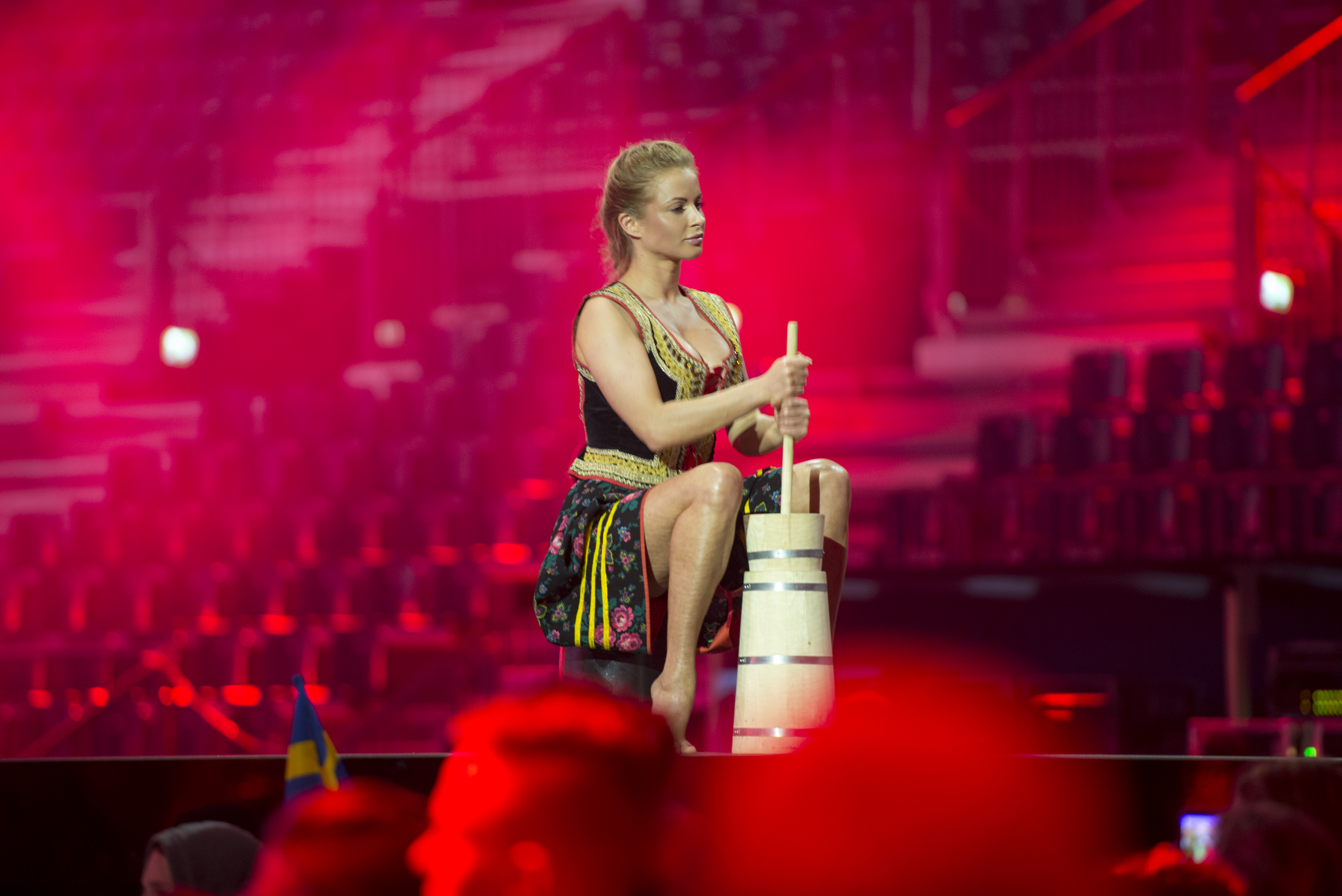
Model churning butter on stage

Cleo, appearing without Donatan on stage, took part in technical rehearsals on 29 April and 3 May, followed by dress rehearsals on 7 and 8 May. This included the jury show on 7 May where the professional juries of each country watched and voted on the competing entries.

The Polish performance featured Cleo performing with three female backing vocalists/dancers and two female models, all in traditional Polish outfits. During the performance, the models suggestively churned butter and washed laundry on stage. The stage LED screens displayed white and red Polish ornaments. The backing performers that joined Cleo on stage were members of the Mazowsze folk group, Alesia Turonak, Sylwia Klan and Anna Łapińska, while the models were members of the Śląsk folk ensemble, Ola Ciupa and Paula Tumala.

At the end of the show, Poland was announced as having finished in the top 10 and subsequently qualifying for the grand final. It was later revealed that Poland placed eighth in the semi-final, receiving a total of 70 points.

=== Final ===
Shortly after the second semi-final, a winners' press conference was held for the ten qualifying countries. As part of this press conference, the qualifying artists took part in a draw to determine which half of the grand final they would subsequently participate in. This draw was done in the order the countries were announced during the semi-final. Poland was drawn to compete in the first half. Following this draw, the shows' producers decided upon the running order of the final, as they had done for the semi-finals. Poland was subsequently placed to perform in position 9, following the entry from Montenegro and before the entry from Greece.

Cleo once again took part in dress rehearsals on 9 and 10 May before the final, including the jury final where the professional juries cast their final votes before the live show. Cleo performed a repeat of her semi-final performance during the final on 10 May. Poland placed fourteenth in the final, scoring 62 points.

=== Voting ===
Voting during the three shows consisted of 50 percent public televoting and 50 percent from a jury deliberation. The jury consisted of five music industry professionals who were citizens of the country they represent. This jury was asked to judge each contestant based on: vocal capacity; the stage performance; the song's composition and originality; and the overall impression by the act. In addition, no member of a national jury could be related in any way to any of the competing acts in such a way that they cannot vote impartially and independently.

Below is a breakdown of points awarded to Poland and awarded by Poland in the second semi-final and grand final of the contest, and the breakdown of the jury voting and televoting conducted during the two shows:

==== Points awarded to Poland ====
Points awarded to Poland (Semi-final 2)
Score	Country
12 points	Germany
10 points	Belarus; Italy
8 points	
7 points	Norway
6 points	
5 points	Slovenia
4 points	Israel; Lithuania; United Kingdom
3 points	Greece; Macedonia; Switzerland
2 points	Austria; Ireland
1 point	Malta

Points awarded to Poland (Final)
Score	Country
12 points	
10 points	Germany
8 points	Italy
7 points	Belarus; Ukraine
6 points	
5 points	France; Macedonia
4 points	Montenegro
3 points	Hungary; Iceland
2 points	Azerbaijan; Moldova; Norway; Sweden
1 point	Greece; Slovenia

==== Points awarded by Poland ====
Points awarded by Poland (Semi-final 2)
Score	Country
12 points	Switzerland
10 points	Austria
8 points	Finland
7 points	Belarus
6 points	Norway
5 points	Ireland
4 points	Malta
3 points	Slovenia
2 points	Lithuania
1 point	Greece

Points awarded by Poland (Final)
Score	Country
12 points	Netherlands
10 points	Switzerland
8 points	Germany
7 points	Norway
6 points	Denmark
5 points	Ukraine
4 points	Sweden
3 points	Finland
2 points	Spain
1 point	Armenia

==== Detailed voting results ====
The following members comprised the Polish jury:

- Paweł Sztompke (jury chairperson) – radio journalist
- Dorota Szpetkowska – journalist
- Krzysztof Kasowski – singer
- Magdalena Tul – singer, represented Poland in the 2011 contest
- Mieczysław Szcześniak – singer, represented Poland in the 1999 contest

Detailed voting results from Poland (Semi-final 2)
R/O	Country	P. Sztompke	D. Szpetkowska	K. Kasowski	M. Tul	M. Szcześniak	Jury Rank	Televote Rank	Combined Rank	Points
01	Malta	1	1	1	1	1	1	12	7	4
02	Israel	13	12	10	9	13	13	11	13	
03	Norway	5	2	11	2	4	3	9	5	6
04	Georgia	4	9	14	13	5	11	14	14	
05	Poland									
06	Austria	6	8	8	10	10	8	1	2	10
07	Lithuania	7	4	12	3	3	5	10	9	2
08	Finland	2	3	2	4	7	2	8	3	8
09	Ireland	8	6	7	7	6	6	7	6	5
10	Belarus	9	10	3	12	9	9	3	4	7
11	Macedonia	10	11	6	5	8	7	13	12	
12	Switzerland	3	5	9	6	2	4	2	1	12
13	Greece	12	14	13	14	12	14	4	10	1
14	Slovenia	11	7	4	8	14	10	5	8	3
15	Romania	14	13	5	11	11	12	6	11	

Detailed voting results from Poland (Final)
R/O	Country	P. Sztompke	D. Szpetkowska	K. Kasowski	M. Tul	M. Szcześniak	Jury Rank	Televote Rank	Combined Rank	Points
01	Ukraine	9	14	18	17	17	16	3	6	5
02	Belarus	17	13	13	20	18	18	8	14	
03	Azerbaijan	8	15	21	7	7	10	23	19	
04	Iceland	15	23	3	12	15	12	18	15	
05	Norway	7	6	5	13	4	5	12	4	7
06	Romania	25	24	14	19	21	22	17	23	
07	Armenia	18	11	23	10	12	15	7	10	1
08	Montenegro	19	21	19	16	23	21	25	24	
09	Poland									
10	Greece	6	25	25	25	25	23	9	17	
11	Austria	24	18	7	18	16	19	4	11	
12	Germany	5	8	17	5	5	7	5	3	8
13	Sweden	10	16	22	11	13	13	6	7	4
14	France	16	17	6	14	11	11	20	16	
15	Russia	20	19	11	23	20	20	14	20	
16	Italy	21	20	20	24	24	24	24	25	
17	Slovenia	23	10	10	15	22	17	15	18	
18	Finland	4	3	4	8	8	3	16	8	3
19	Spain	14	7	16	6	6	9	11	9	2
20	Switzerland	2	5	9	9	2	4	1	2	10
21	Hungary	13	4	8	4	10	6	19	13	
22	Malta	3	2	2	2	3	2	22	12	
23	Denmark	12	9	12	3	9	8	10	5	6
24	Netherlands	1	1	1	1	1	1	2	1	12
25	San Marino	22	22	24	22	19	25	13	22	
26	United Kingdom	11	12	15	21	14	14	21	21	
