= Switzerland in the Eurovision Song Contest 2014 =

- Eurovision Song Contest 2014
- Participating broadcaster: Swiss Broadcasting Corporation (SRG SSR)
- Country: Switzerland
- Selection process: Die grosse Entscheidungs Show 2014
- Selection date: 1 February 2014

Competing entry
- Song: "Hunter of Stars"
- Artist: Sebalter
- Songwriters: Sebastiano Paù-Lessi

Placement
- Semi-final result: Qualified (4th, 92 points)
- Final result: 13th, 64 points

Participation chronology

Switzerland was represented at the Eurovision Song Contest 2014 with the song "Hunter of Stars" written and performed by Sebalter, which is the artistic name of singer Sebastiano Paù-Lessi. The Swiss entry for the 2014 contest in Copenhagen, Denmark was selected through the national final Die grosse Entscheidungs Show 2014, organised by the Swiss German speaking broadcaster Schweizer Radio und Fernsehen (SRF) in collaboration with the other broadcasters part of the Swiss Broadcasting Corporation (SRG SSR). Artists that were interested in entering the Swiss national final had the opportunity to apply to one of three open selections with defined submission periods organised by SRF together with the Swiss-Romansh broadcaster Radiotelevisiun Svizra Rumantscha (RTR), the Swiss-French broadcaster Radio Télévision Suisse (RTS) and/or the Swiss-Italian broadcaster Radiotelevisione svizzera (RSI). A total of 18 entries were selected to advance to an "Expert Check" round; nine entries were selected from the SRF/RTR selection, six entries were selected from the RTS selection and three entries were selected from the RSI selection. The "Expert Check" was held on 30 November 2013 and involved three/four experts evaluating the live performances of the 18 entries and selecting six entries to advance to the televised national final—three artists and songs from the SRF/RTR candidates, two from the RTS candidates and one from the RSI candidates. The six finalists performed during the national final on 1 February 2014 where a combination of jury voting and public voting ultimately selected "Hunter of Stars" performed by Sebalter as the winner.

Switzerland was drawn to compete in the second semi-final of the Eurovision Song Contest which took place on 8 May 2014. Performing during the show in position 12, "Hunter of Stars" was announced among the top 10 entries of the second semi-final and therefore qualified to compete in the final on 12 May. It was later revealed that Switzerland placed fourth out of the 15 participating countries in the semi-final with 92 points. In the final, Switzerland performed in position 19 and placed thirteenth out of the 26 participating countries, scoring 64 points.

== Background ==
Prior to the 2014 contest, Switzerland had participated in the Eurovision Song Contest fifty-four times since its first entry in 1956. Switzerland is noted for having won the first edition of the Eurovision Song Contest with the song "Refrain" performed by Lys Assia. Their second and, to this point, most recent victory was achieved in 1988 when Canadian singer Céline Dion won the contest with the song "Ne partez pas sans moi". Following the introduction of semi-finals for the 2004, Switzerland had managed to participate in the final three times up to this point. In 2005, the internal selection of Estonian girl band Vanilla Ninja, performing the song "Cool Vibes", qualified Switzerland to the final where they placed 8th. Due to their successful result in 2005, Switzerland was pre-qualified to compete directly in the final in 2006. Between 2007 and 2010, the nation failed to qualify to the final after a string of internal selections. Since opting to organize a national final from 2011 onwards, Switzerland has managed to qualify to the final once out of the last three years. In 2013, Takasa and their song "You and Me" failed to qualify Switzerland to the final placing 13th in their semi-final.

The Swiss national broadcaster, Swiss Broadcasting Corporation (SRG SSR), broadcasts the event within Switzerland and organises the selection process for the nation's entry. SRG SSR confirmed their intentions to participate at the 2014 Eurovision Song Contest on 17 July 2013. Along with their participation confirmation, the broadcaster also announced that the Swiss entry for the 2014 contest would be selected through a national final. Switzerland has selected their entry for the Eurovision Song Contest through both national finals and internal selections in the past. Between 2005 and 2010, the Swiss entry was internally selected for the competition. Since 2011, the broadcaster has opted to organize a national final in order to select their entry.

== Before Eurovision ==
=== Die grosse Entscheidungs Show 2014 ===
Die grosse Entscheidungs Show 2014 was the fourth edition of the Swiss national final format that selected Switzerland's entry for the Eurovision Song Contest 2014. The national final was a collaboration between four broadcasters in Switzerland: the Swiss-German broadcaster Schweizer Radio und Fernsehen (SRF), the Swiss-French broadcaster Radio Télévision Suisse (RTS), the Swiss-Italian broadcaster Radiotelevisione svizzera (RSI) and the Swiss-Romansh broadcaster Radiotelevisiun Svizra Rumantscha (RTR). The show took place on 1 February 2014 at the Bodensee Arena in Kreuzlingen, hosted by Sven Epiney and was televised on SRF 1, RSI La 2 with Italian commentary by Sandy Altermatt and Ale Bertoglio, and RTS Deux with French commentary by Valérie Ogier and Jean-Marc Richard. The competition was also streamed online at the respective official website of each Swiss broadcaster as well as at the official Eurovision Song Contest website eurovision.tv.

==== Selection process ====
The selection process took place in three stages before the finalists for the live show and ultimately the winner are selected. The first stage of the competition included SRF/RTR, RTS and RSI each conducting varying selections in order to determine the candidates they submitted for the second stage of the competition. SRF/RTR submitted nine candidates, RTS submitted six candidates and RSI submitted three candidates. The second stage was the Expert Check live audition, where the 18 selected candidates performed the songs that qualified from their respective broadcaster selections. A jury panel selected three artists and songs to qualify from the SRF/RTR selection, two from the RTS selection and one from the RSI selection. The six artists and songs proceed to the third stage, the televised national final, where the winning artist and song was selected to represent Switzerland in Copenhagen.

- The SRF/RTR selection involved an online internet voting platform where interested artists could submit their songs and have them listed for public listening. The platform accepted entries between 30 September 2013 and 28 October 2013. 159 entries were submitted following the submission deadline, including entries from 2006 Cypriot entrant Annet Artani and 2011 Croatian entrant Daria Kinzer. Internet users had between 4 and 18 November 2013 to vote for their favourite entries and their votes were combined with the votes from an expert jury. On 22 November 2013, the top nine entries for the "Expert Check" were announced.
- The RTS selection involved interested artists submitting their entries to the broadcaster between 30 September 2013 and 28 October 2013. At the close of the deadline, 34 entries were received. The entries were evaluated from 4 to 18 November 2013 by the votes from internet users (50%) and the votes of an expert jury (50%), and the top six entries that proceeded to the "Expert Check" were announced on 21 November 2013.
- RSI opened a submission period between 21 July 2013 and 28 October 2013 for interested artists and composers to submit their entries. Originally, a seven-song regional final, including a wildcard entry from the winner of the singing competition Fattore Voce 2013 Agata Pelloni, would have been broadcast via radio on RSI Rete Tre from Lugano. However, the broadcaster opted to suspend the selection and extend the submission deadline to 28 October 2013. On 13 November 2013, a jury panel consisting of 2008 Swiss contest entrant Paolo Meneguzzi, Ramona Cerutti and Igor Negrini evaluated the 23 entry submissions received and selected the three candidates that proceeded to the "Expert Check".

==== Expert Check ====
The "Expert Check" of the nineteen selected candidates was webcast from SRF studios in Zürich on 30 November 2013 and was hosted by Sven Epiney. The candidates performed their songs in front of an expert panel which assessed the performers on criteria such as live performance skills, voice quality and stage presence. The expert panel consisted of two permanent judges and representatives of the four Swiss broadcasters that only judged the candidates from their respective selections. The permanent judges were choreographer Rafael Antonio and vocal coach Freda Goodlett, while the broadcaster representatives were the director of strategic marketing at Universal Music Switzerland Moritz Faccin (representative of SRF/RTR), the director of Option Musique Catherine Colombara (representative of RTS), RTS entertainment production manager Emile Felber (representative of RTS) and musician Nicola Locarnini (representative of RSI). Three artists and songs qualified from the SRF/RTR selection, two from the RTS selection and one from the RSI selection.

Expert Check – 30 November 2013
Channel	R/O	Artist	Song	Songwriter(s)	Result
SRF/RTR	1	Yasmina Hunzinger	"I Still Believe"	Marin Subasic, Sven Welter	Advanced
SRF/RTR	2	3 for All	"Together Forever"	Domenico Livrano, Ricardo Sanz, Lars van Everdingen, Rick Laine	Advanced
SRF/RTR	3	Swissters	"Celebration"	Eve Kay, Carole Kay	—N/a
RTS	4	Lola Sparkes	"Baby Can't You See"	A-S Dubey, Chris Bovet	—N/a
RTS	5	Christian Tschanz	"Au paradis"	Christian Tschanz	Advanced
RTS	6	Tanita	"Another Day Alone"	Alex Tsikouras	—N/a
RTS	7	Natacha and Stéphanie	"Une terre sans vous"	Alizé Oswald, Xavier Michel	Advanced
RTS	8	Paula Marengo	"J'ai envie de toi"	Paula Marengo, Juan Carlos Lax	—N/a
RTS	9	Joel Murner	"In My Life"	Joel Murner	—N/a
RSI	10	Jasmine	"Higher Love"	Jasmin Pearl, Arizona Stoneheart	—N/a
RSI	11	Sebalter	"Hunter of Stars"	Sebastiano Paù-Lessi	Advanced
RSI	12	Valentino Alfano	"103 parole"	Valentino Alfano	—N/a
SRF/RTR	13	Gosia	"I'm Not Afraid"	Andrei K. Leon, Andres Fresko, Artur Kamiński, Małgorzata Andrzejewicz, Chris Stowe	—N/a
SRF/RTR	14	Nino Colonna	"La luce del cuore"	Nino Colonna	Advanced
SRF/RTR	15	Arxplendida	"Mercurii diei"	Pascal Föhr	—N/a
SRF/RTR	16	Hot Connection	"Music From the Sixties"	Roland Stucki	—N/a
SRF/RTR	17	One Day Remains	"Alpha"	Claudio Rodriguez, Matthias Hillebrand-Gonzalez, Pedro Rodrigues, Samuel Berger	—N/a
SRF/RTR	18	Martin Kirchberger	"Yourope"	Martin Kirchberger	—N/a

==== Final ====
The final took place on 1 February 2014. The show consisted of two parts: in the first part the six candidate songs in contention to represent Switzerland were performed and in the second part each artist performed a cover version of a song of their choice. The combination of televoting (50%) and the votes of an expert jury (50%) selected "Hunter of Stars" performed by Sebalter as the winner. The jury consisted of Luisa Rossi (actress), Igor Negrini (lead singer for Swiss band The Flag), Stefan Büsser (presenter), Catherine Colombara (director of Option Musique), Thierry Romanens (singer-songwriter), Pele Loriano (musician), Tamara Steffen (music editor Radio SRF 3), Tanja Dankner (vocal coach), René Spescha (production manager RTR) and Dominik Flaschka (director). In addition to the performances from the competing artists, Danish Eurovision Song Contest 2013 winner Emmelie de Forest performed "Only Teardrops" as the interval act.

Final – 1 February 2014
R/O	Artist	Song	R/O	Song (Original artists)	Place
1	Christian Tschanz	"Au paradis"	7	"Aux Champs-Élysées" (Joe Dassin)	4
2	3 for All	"Together Forever"	8	"All For Love" (Bryan Adams, Rod Stewart and Sting)	3
3	Nino Colonna	"La luce del cuore"	9	"L'Italiano" (Toto Cutugno)	5
4	Yasmina Hunzinger	"I Still Believe"	10	"Heavy on My Heart" (Anastacia)	2
5	Natacha and Stéphanie	"Une terre sans vous"	11	"Papaoutai" (Stromae)	6
6	Sebalter	"Hunter of Stars"	12	"Wake Me Up" (Avicii)	1

=== Promotion ===
Sebalter made several appearances across Europe to specifically promote "Hunter of Stars" as the Swiss Eurovision entry. On 8 February, Sebalter performed "Hunter of Stars" during the final of the Maltese Eurovision national final. On 5 April, Sebalter performed during the Eurovision in Concert event which was held at the Melkweg venue in Amsterdam, Netherlands and hosted by Cornald Maas and Sandra Reemer. On 13 April, Sebalter performed during the London Eurovision Party, which was held at the Café de Paris venue in London, United Kingdom and hosted by Nicki French and Paddy O'Connell.

== At Eurovision ==
Sebalter presenting himself and "Hunter of Stars" at the Eurovision Song Contest 2014

According to Eurovision rules, all nations with the exceptions of the host country and the "Big Five" (France, Germany, Italy, Spain and the United Kingdom) are required to qualify from one of two semi-finals in order to compete for the final; the top ten countries from each semi-final progress to the final. The European Broadcasting Union (EBU) split up the competing countries into six different pots based on voting patterns from previous contests, with countries with favourable voting histories put into the same pot. On 20 January 2014, a special allocation draw was held which placed each country into one of the two semi-finals, as well as which half of the show they would perform in. Switzerland was placed into the second semi-final, to be held on 8 May 2014, and was scheduled to perform in the second half of the show.

Once all the competing songs for the 2014 contest had been released, the running order for the semi-finals was decided by the shows' producers rather than through another draw, so that similar songs were not placed next to each other. Switzerland was set to perform in position 10, following the entry from Macedonia and before the entry from Greece.

In Switzerland, three broadcasters that form SRG SSR aired the contest. Sven Epiney provided German commentary for both semi-finals airing on SRF zwei and the final airing on SRF 1. Jean-Marc Richard and Valérie Ogier provided French commentary for the second semi-final on RTS Deux and the final on RTS Un. Sandy Altermatt and Alessandro Bertoglio provided Italian commentary for the second semi-final on RSI La 2 and the final on RSI La 1. The Swiss spokesperson, who announced the Swiss votes during the final, was Kurt Aeschbacher.

=== Semi-final ===
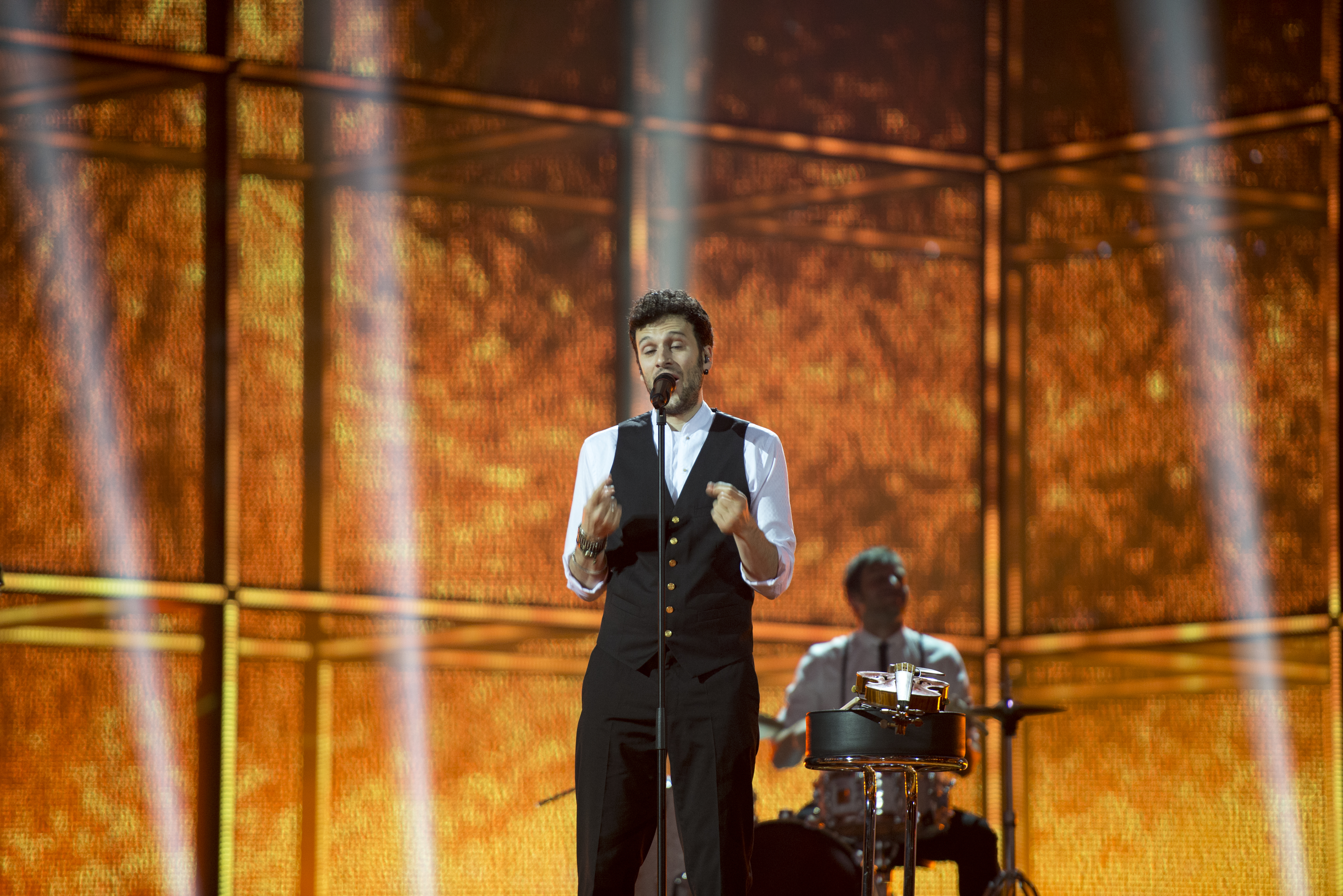
Sebalter during a rehearsal before the second semi-final

Sebalter took part in technical rehearsals on 30 April and 3 May, followed by dress rehearsals on 7 and 8 May. This included the jury show on 7 May where the professional juries of each country watched and voted on the competing entries.

The Swiss performance featured Sebalter performing on stage together with a backing vocalist and four musicians, all wearing black vests above white shirts. Sebalter ran across the stage throughout the performance while playing the violin and drum. The stage was set in blue colours with fiery elements being displayed on the LED screens. The performance also featured effects including pyrotechnic explosions and a pyrotechnic waterfall. The backing vocalist that joined Sebalter was Patric Scott, while the musicians were: Marco Cuzzovaglia, Rocco Casella, Mattia Bordignon and Christoph Pedretti.

At the end of the show, Switzerland was announced as having finished in the top 10 and subsequently qualifying for the grand final. It was later revealed that Switzerland placed fourth in the semi-final, receiving a total of 92 points.

=== Final ===
Shortly after the second semi-final, a winners' press conference was held for the ten qualifying countries. As part of this press conference, the qualifying artists took part in a draw to determine which half of the grand final they would subsequently participate in. This draw was done in the order the countries were announced during the semi-final. Switzerland was drawn to compete in the second half. Following this draw, the shows' producers decided upon the running order of the final, as they had done for the semi-finals. Switzerland was subsequently placed to perform in position 20, following the entry from Spain and before the entry from Hungary.

Sebalter once again took part in dress rehearsals on 9 and 10 May before the final, including the jury final where the professional juries cast their final votes before the live show. Sebalter performed a repeat of his semi-final performance during the final on 10 May. At the conclusion of the voting, Switzerland finished in thirteenth place with 64 points.

=== Voting ===
Voting during the three shows consisted of 50 percent public televoting and 50 percent from a jury deliberation. The jury consisted of five music industry professionals who were citizens of the country they represent, with their names published before the contest to ensure transparency. This jury was asked to judge each contestant based on: vocal capacity; the stage performance; the song's composition and originality; and the overall impression by the act. In addition, no member of a national jury could be related in any way to any of the competing acts in such a way that they cannot vote impartially and independently. The individual rankings of each jury member were released shortly after the grand final.

Following the release of the full split voting by the EBU after the conclusion of the competition, it was revealed that Switzerland had placed seventh with the public televote and twenty-second with the jury vote in the final. In the public vote, Switzerland scored 114 points, while with the jury vote, Switzerland scored 27 points. In the second semi-final, Switzerland placed fourth with the public televote with 98 points and tenth with the jury vote, scoring 51 points.

Below is a breakdown of points awarded to Switzerland and awarded by Switzerland in the second semi-final and grand final of the contest, and the breakdown of the jury voting and televoting conducted during the two shows:

==== Points awarded to Switzerland ====
Points awarded to Switzerland (Semi-final 2)
Score	Country
12 points	Poland
10 points	Germany; Romania
8 points	Finland; Slovenia
7 points	Lithuania
6 points	Austria; Ireland
5 points	Greece; Israel; Malta
4 points	
3 points	Belarus; Italy; United Kingdom
2 points	
1 point	Macedonia

Points awarded to Switzerland (Final)
Score	Country
12 points	
10 points	Poland
8 points	
7 points	Portugal
6 points	Romania
5 points	Armenia; Ireland; Montenegro
4 points	Greece
3 points	Austria; Germany; Malta; Netherlands; Slovenia
2 points	Italy; Lithuania
1 point	Georgia; Hungary; United Kingdom

==== Points awarded by Switzerland ====
Points awarded by Switzerland (Semi-final 2)
Score	Country
12 points	Austria
10 points	Macedonia
8 points	Finland
7 points	Romania
6 points	Slovenia
5 points	Malta
4 points	Greece
3 points	Poland
2 points	Norway
1 point	Ireland

Points awarded by Switzerland (Final)
Score	Country
12 points	Austria
10 points	Netherlands
8 points	Spain
7 points	Germany
6 points	Sweden
5 points	Norway
4 points	Finland
3 points	Denmark
2 points	Italy
1 point	Hungary

==== Detailed voting results ====
The following members comprised the Swiss jury:

- Marcus van Lier (jury chairperson) – Managing Director Warner Music Switzerland
- Mélanie Freymond – television and radio host
- Ivan Broggini – singer, represented Switzerland in the 2012 contest as member of Sinplus
- Sina Bellwald – singer, songwriter
- Pascal Vonlanthen (Gustav) – singer, songwriter

Detailed voting results from Switzerland (Semi-final 2)
R/O	Country	M. van Lier	M. Freymond	I. Broggini	S. Bellwald	Gustav	Jury Rank	Televote Rank	Combined Rank	Points
01	Malta	8	4	9	2	4	4	9	6	5
02	Israel	12	7	7	12	14	11	12	12	
03	Norway	11	3	1	1	1	3	11	9	2
04	Georgia	5	8	12	14	13	12	14	13	
05	Poland	4	14	5	13	5	9	5	8	3
06	Austria	3	2	6	3	2	2	1	1	12
07	Lithuania	13	11	11	11	12	14	13	14	
08	Finland	2	1	2	5	3	1	7	3	8
09	Ireland	10	6	3	8	11	7	10	10	1
10	Belarus	14	13	14	7	7	13	8	11	
11	Macedonia	9	9	4	6	6	6	2	2	10
12	Switzerland									
13	Greece	7	12	13	9	8	10	4	7	4
14	Slovenia	6	5	8	4	10	5	6	5	6
15	Romania	1	10	10	10	9	8	3	4	7

Detailed voting results from Switzerland (Final)
R/O	Country	M. van Lier	M. Freymond	I. Broggini	S. Bellwald	Gustav	Jury Rank	Televote Rank	Combined Rank	Points
01	Ukraine	25	20	17	13	12	20	21	22	
02	Belarus	23	21	20	20	17	23	22	23	
03	Azerbaijan	24	17	21	8	19	22	25	24	
04	Iceland	12	12	22	22	13	17	17	17	
05	Norway	10	10	2	2	3	4	12	6	5
06	Romania	11	19	18	16	14	15	13	15	
07	Armenia	15	9	14	9	11	11	10	12	
08	Montenegro	18	18	19	15	18	21	16	20	
09	Poland	16	25	9	25	9	18	7	14	
10	Greece	13	22	25	24	25	24	9	16	
11	Austria	6	1	8	1	1	1	1	1	12
12	Germany	17	5	12	12	8	9	4	4	7
13	Sweden	1	6	7	19	20	8	6	5	6
14	France	3	15	23	23	10	13	23	19	
15	Russia	14	24	16	10	21	19	18	21	
16	Italy	21	14	4	14	22	14	5	9	2
17	Slovenia	22	16	13	5	23	16	20	18	
18	Finland	4	4	3	4	4	2	15	7	4
19	Spain	19	3	6	11	15	10	3	3	8
20	Switzerland									
21	Hungary	5	13	10	18	16	12	8	10	1
22	Malta	7	8	15	6	7	6	14	11	
23	Denmark	9	11	11	7	5	7	11	8	3
24	Netherlands	8	2	5	3	2	3	2	2	10
25	San Marino	20	23	24	21	24	25	24	25	
26	United Kingdom	2	7	1	17	6	5	19	13	
