= Montenegro in the Eurovision Song Contest 2014 =

- Eurovision Song Contest 2014
- Participating broadcaster: Radio i Televizija Crne Gore (RTCG)
- Country: Montenegro
- Selection process: Internal selection
- Announcement date: Artist: 19 November 2013; Song: 9 March 2014

Competing entry
- Song: "Moj svijet"
- Artist: Sergej Ćetković
- Songwriters: Sergej Ćetković; Emina Sandal

Placement
- Semi-final result: Qualified (7th, 63 points)
- Final result: 19th, 37 points

Participation chronology

Montenegro was represented at the Eurovision Song Contest 2014 with the song "Moj svijet" written by Sergej Ćetković and Emina Sandal. The song was performed by Sergej Ćetković, who was internally selected by the Montenegrin broadcaster Radio i televizija Crne Gore (RTCG) to represent the nation at the 2014 contest in Copenhagen, Denmark. Sergej Ćetković was announced as the Montenegrin representative on 19 November 2013, while his song, "Moj svijet", was presented to the public at a press conference on 9 March 2014.

Montenegro was drawn to compete in the first semi-final in the Eurovision Song Contest which took place on 6 May 2014. Performing during the show in position 15, "Moj svijet" was announced among the top 10 entries of the first semi-final and therefore qualified to compete in the final on 10 May. This marked the first qualification to the final for Montenegro since they debuted in the contest in 2007. It was later revealed that Montenegro placed seventh out of the 16 participating countries in the semi-final with 63 points. In the final, Montenegro performed in position 8 and placed nineteenth out of the 26 participating countries, scoring 37 points.

== Background ==
Prior to the 2014 contest, Montenegro had participated in the Eurovision Song Contest as an independent nation five times since its first entry in its own right in 2007. To this point, Montenegro has yet to feature in a final. The nation briefly withdrew from the competition between 2010 and 2011 citing financial difficulties as the reason for their absence. In 2013, the nation failed to qualify with the song "Igranka" performed by Who See.

The Montenegrin national broadcaster, Radio i televizija Crne Gore (RTCG), broadcasts the event within Montenegro and organises the selection process for the nation's entry. RTCG confirmed that Montenegro would participate at the Eurovision Song Contest 2014 on 25 September 2013. Montenegro has used various methods to select the Montenegrin entry in the past, such as internal selections and televised national finals to choose the performer, song or both to compete at Eurovision. Since 2009, the broadcaster has opted to internally select both the artist and song that would represent Montenegro, a procedure that continued for the selection of the 2014 entry.

== Before Eurovision ==
=== Internal selection ===
On 19 November 2013, it was announced during a press conference held at the RTCG Headquarters in Podgorica that Sergej Ćetković would represent Montenegro in Copenhagen. Sergej Ćetković previously attempted to represent Serbia and Montenegro in 2004 where he placed eighth in their national final with the song "Ne mogu da ti oprostim". In response to preparations surrounding the song, Ćetković stated: "Our song for the Eurovision in Denmark will be a song with a high quality. Of course we hope to get into the final. For me that would be a good result."

The Montenegrin song, "Moj svijet", was presented at a press conference on 9 March 2014, which was held at the Hotel Splendid in Bečići and hosted by Sabrija Vulić. The event was televised on TVCG 1 and TVCG SAT as well as broadcast online via the broadcaster's website rtcg.me and the official Eurovision Song Contest website eurovision.tv. "Moj svijet" was written by Sergej Ćetković and Emina Sandal, while production and mixing was carried out by Marko Milatović and Vladan Popović. An English version of the song titled "My Love", with lyrics by Biljana Marković, was also recorded. Ćetković recorded the music video for the song in February 2014, which was filmed in Karuč, Žabljak, Bar and Ulcinj and directed by Aleksandar Kerekeš.

=== Promotion ===
Sergej Ćetković made several appearances across Europe to specifically promote "Moj svijet" as the Montenegrin Eurovision entry. On 5 April, Sergej Ćetković performed during the Eurovision in Concert event which was held at the Melkweg venue in Amsterdam, Netherlands and hosted by Cornald Maas and Sandra Reemer. On 13 April, Ćetković performed during the London Eurovision Party, which was held at the Café de Paris venue in London, United Kingdom and hosted by Nicki French and Paddy O'Connell.

== At Eurovision ==
Sergej Ćetković presenting himself and "Moj svijet" at the Eurovision Song Contest 2014

According to Eurovision rules, all nations with the exceptions of the host country and the "Big Five" (France, Germany, Italy, Spain and the United Kingdom) are required to qualify from one of two semi-finals in order to compete for the final; the top ten countries from each semi-final progress to the final. The European Broadcasting Union (EBU) split up the competing countries into six different pots based on voting patterns from previous contests, with countries with favourable voting histories put into the same pot. On 20 January 2014, a special allocation draw was held which placed each country into one of the two semi-finals, as well as which half of the show they would perform in. Montenegro was placed into the first semi-final, to be held on 6 May 2014, and was scheduled to perform in the second half of the show.

Once all the competing songs for the 2014 contest had been released, the running order for the semi-finals was decided by the shows' producers rather than through another draw, so that similar songs were not placed next to each other. Montenegro was set to perform in position 15, following the entry from the Netherlands and before the entry from Hungary.

The two semi-finals and the final were broadcast in Montenegro on TVCG 1 and TVCG SAT with commentary by Dražen Bauković and Tamara Ivanković. The three shows were also broadcast via radio on Radio Crne Gore and Radio 98 with commentary by Sonja Savović and Sanja Pejović. The Montenegrin spokesperson, who announced the Montenegrin votes during the final, was Tijana Mišković.

=== Semi-final ===
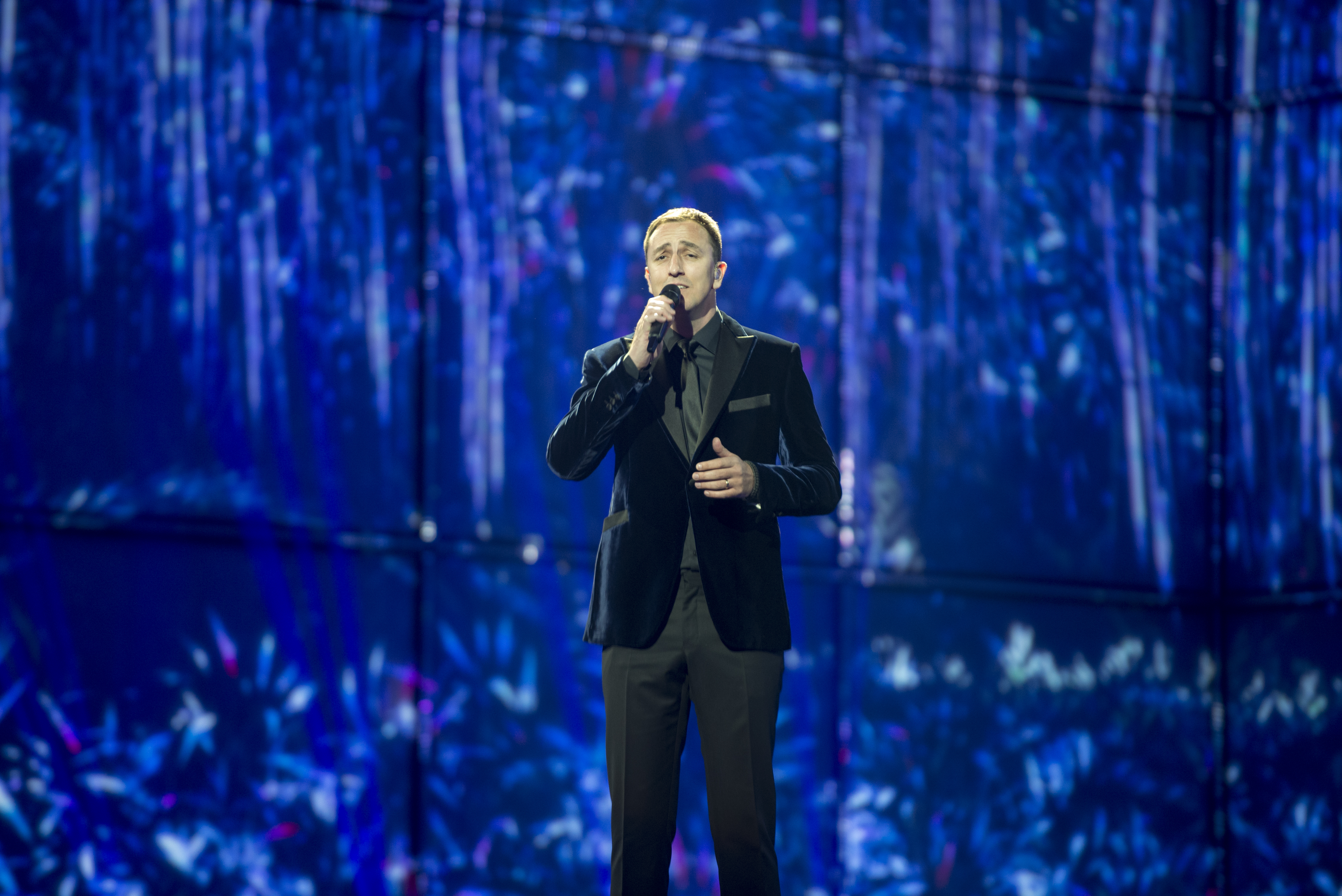
Sergej Ćetković during a rehearsal before the first semi-final

Sergej Ćetković took part in technical rehearsals on 29 April and 2 May, followed by dress rehearsals on 5 and 6 May. This included the jury show on 5 May where the professional juries of each country watched and voted on the competing entries.

The Montenegrin performance featured Sergej Ćetković on stage in a black suit with a figure skater. The performance began with Ćetković walking to the centre of the stage alone, while the figure skater joined Ćetković during the song with the LED floor displaying white sparkles as her skates touched the floor. The stage director for the performance was Marko Novaković. The figure skater performing with Sergej Ćetković was Jovana Stanisavljević and three backing vocalists, Ivana Cabraja, Martina Majerle and Dragan Brnas, were also part of the performance. Martina Majerle previously represented Slovenia in 2009 together with the group Quartissimo.

At the end of the show, Montenegro was announced as having finished in the top 10 and subsequently qualifying for the grand final. This marked the first qualification to the final for Montenegro since they debuted in the contest in 2007. It was later revealed that Montenegro placed seventh in the semi-final, receiving a total of 63 points.

=== Final ===
Shortly after the first semi-final, a winners' press conference was held for the ten qualifying countries. As part of this press conference, the qualifying artists took part in a draw to determine which half of the grand final they would subsequently participate in. This draw was done in the order the countries were announced during the semi-final. Montenegro was drawn to compete in the first half. Following this draw, the shows' producers decided upon the running order of the final, as they had done for the semi-finals. Montenegro was subsequently placed to perform in position 8, following the entry from Armenia and before the entry from Poland.

Sergej Ćetković once again took part in dress rehearsals on 9 and 10 May before the final, including the jury final where the professional juries cast their final votes before the live show. Sergej Ćetković performed a repeat of his semi-final performance during the final on 10 May. Montenegro placed nineteenth in the final, scoring 37 points.

=== Voting ===
Voting during the three shows consisted of 50 percent public televoting and 50 percent from a jury deliberation. The jury consisted of five music industry professionals who were citizens of the country they represent, with their names published before the contest to ensure transparency. This jury was asked to judge each contestant based on: vocal capacity; the stage performance; the song's composition and originality; and the overall impression by the act. In addition, no member of a national jury could be related in any way to any of the competing acts in such a way that they cannot vote impartially and independently. The individual rankings of each jury member were released shortly after the grand final. In the semi-final, Montenegro's vote was based on 100 percent jury voting due to either technical issues with the televoting or an insufficient number of valid votes cast during the televote period.

Following the release of the full split voting by the EBU after the conclusion of the competition, it was revealed that Montenegro had placed eighteenth with the public televote and twentieth with the jury vote in the final. In the public vote, Montenegro scored 33 points, while with the jury vote, Montenegro scored 48 points. In the first semi-final, Montenegro placed tenth with the public televote with 43 points and seventh with the jury vote, scoring 74 points.

Below is a breakdown of points awarded to Montenegro and awarded by Montenegro in the first semi-final and grand final of the contest, and the breakdown of the jury voting and televoting conducted during the two shows:

==== Points awarded to Montenegro ====
Points awarded to Montenegro (Semi-final 1)
Score	Country
12 points	Albania
10 points	
8 points	Armenia
7 points	France
6 points	Netherlands; Portugal
5 points	Moldova; Russia
4 points	Hungary; Spain
3 points	Sweden
2 points	Azerbaijan
1 point	Ukraine

Points awarded to Montenegro (Final)
Score	Country
12 points	Armenia; Macedonia
10 points	
8 points	
7 points	Slovenia
6 points	Albania
5 points	
4 points	
3 points	
2 points	
1 point	

==== Points awarded by Montenegro ====
Points awarded by Montenegro (Semi-final 1)
Score	Country
12 points	Albania
10 points	Armenia
8 points	Ukraine
7 points	Azerbaijan
6 points	Moldova
5 points	Sweden
4 points	Russia
3 points	Portugal
2 points	Belgium
1 point	Netherlands

Points awarded by Montenegro (Final)
Score	Country
12 points	Hungary
10 points	Armenia
8 points	Slovenia
7 points	Ukraine
6 points	Italy
5 points	Switzerland
4 points	Poland
3 points	Sweden
2 points	Austria
1 point	Belarus

==== Detailed voting results ====
The following members comprised the Montenegrin jury:

- Stefan Filipović (jury chairperson) – musician, singer, represented Montenegro in the 2008 contest
- Slobodan Bučevac – music producer, composer of the 1984 Yugoslav contest entry "Ciao, amore"
- Zoja Đurović – music professor
- Senad Gačević – music professor
- Mihailo Radonjić – composer

Detailed voting results from Montenegro (Semi-final 1)
R/O	Country	S. Filipović	S. Bučevac	Z. Đurović	S. Gačević	M. Radonjić	Jury Rank	Points
01	Armenia	2	2	3	2	1	2	10
02	Latvia	11	10	9	9	15	11	
03	Estonia	12	13	10	8	12	13	
04	Sweden	5	5	6	13	5	6	5
05	Iceland	9	14	11	15	11	14	
06	Albania	1	1	1	1	2	1	12
07	Russia	10	8	8	6	7	7	4
08	Azerbaijan	3	4	4	3	4	4	7
09	Ukraine	4	3	2	4	3	3	8
10	Belgium	13	9	13	11	8	9	2
11	Moldova	6	6	5	5	6	5	6
12	San Marino	8	15	14	14	13	15	
13	Portugal	7	7	15	10	14	8	3
14	Netherlands	15	11	12	7	9	10	1
15	Montenegro							
16	Hungary	14	12	7	12	10	12	

Detailed voting results from Montenegro (Final)
R/O	Country	S. Filipović	S. Bučevac	Z. Đurović	S. Gačević	M. Radonjić	Jury Rank	Televote Rank	Combined Rank	Points
01	Ukraine	9	9	8	7	7	8	8	4	7
02	Belarus	8	8	9	10	9	9	13	10	1
03	Azerbaijan	19	18	19	17	19	19	15	19	
04	Iceland	16	16	16	14	15	15	21	20	
05	Norway	23	24	25	22	22	25	19	24	
06	Romania	20	20	21	25	25	22	3	14	
07	Armenia	1	1	1	1	2	1	10	2	10
08	Montenegro									
09	Poland	6	7	7	8	8	7	11	7	4
10	Greece	10	10	10	9	10	10	16	15	
11	Austria	18	19	18	19	17	17	5	9	2
12	Germany	4	3	2	2	1	2	20	11	
13	Sweden	15	17	15	16	16	16	4	8	3
14	France	11	11	11	11	11	11	22	18	
15	Russia	25	23	17	24	24	23	1	12	
16	Italy	5	5	5	5	5	5	12	5	6
17	Slovenia	14	14	13	12	13	13	2	3	8
18	Finland	21	25	22	20	21	21	24	25	
19	Spain	22	21	20	21	20	20	17	21	
20	Switzerland	13	13	12	13	12	12	6	6	5
21	Hungary	2	2	3	3	3	3	7	1	12
22	Malta	3	4	4	4	4	4	25	17	
23	Denmark	12	12	14	15	14	14	23	22	
24	Netherlands	17	15	24	18	18	18	9	16	
25	San Marino	7	6	6	6	6	6	18	13	
26	United Kingdom	24	22	23	23	23	24	14	23	
