= San Marino in the Eurovision Song Contest 2014 =

- Eurovision Song Contest 2014
- Participating broadcaster: San Marino RTV (SMRTV)
- Country: San Marino
- Selection process: Internal selection
- Announcement date: Artist: 19 June 2013; Song: 14 March 2014

Competing entry
- Song: "Maybe"
- Artist: Valentina Monetta
- Songwriters: Ralph Siegel; Mauro Balestri

Placement
- Semi-final result: Qualified (10th, 40 points)
- Final result: 24th, 14 points

Participation chronology

San Marino was represented at the Eurovision Song Contest 2014, held in Copenhagen, Denmark. The Sammarinese national broadcaster San Marino RTV (SMRTV) internally selected Valentina Monetta with "Maybe" to represent the nation in the contest. Monetta had previously represented San Marino in both the 2012 and 2013 contests, though both entries failed to qualify for the grand final. The 2014 entry was promoted through the creation of music videos in both English and Italian, and a promotional tour that included stops in Amsterdam, Moscow and London. San Marino performed 12th in the first semi-final of the Eurovision Song Contest 2014, held on 6 May 2014, and placed 10th, receiving 40 points. The entry qualified for the grand final held four days later, where the nation placed 24th with 14 points. This marked their best placing to this point.

== Background ==
Prior to the 2014 contest, San Marino had participated in the Eurovision Song Contest four times since their debut in the 2008 contest. For all of these appearances, San Marino RTV (SMRTV) hosted internal selection processes, choosing the band Miodio with the song "Complice" for 2008, Senit with "Stand By" for 2011, and Valentina Monetta for 2012 and 2013 with "The Social Network Song" and "Crisalide (Vola)", respectively. All competed in the respective semi-finals of their contests, but failed to qualify for the grand final. To this point, the nation's best placing in the contest was 11th in the semi-finals, which they achieved in the Eurovision Song Contest 2013. San Marino did not compete in the 2009 or 2010 contests, citing financial difficulties.

== Before Eurovision ==
=== Internal selection ===
Three time entrant Valentina Monetta presenting herself during the Eurovision Song Contest 2014.

On 19 June 2013, SMRTV announced that they had internally selected Valentina Monetta to represent San Marino at the Eurovision Song Contest 2014 for a third consecutive time, making her the first singer to participate in three consecutive contests since Udo Jürgens, who competed in 1964, 1965 and 1966 for Austria. A special presentation programme titled Verso Copenhagen to reveal Monetta's song was scheduled to be held on 14 March 2014 at the SMRTV studio. However, it was reported a day before the programme that "Maybe" (and/or the Italian version "Forse") would be the song to represent San Marino in the Eurovision Song Contest 2014 after snippets in both versions were available for preview and pre-order at digital download outlet Amazon, with the ultimate version still yet to be decided. Eurovision and radio edits in both versions, as well as a dance remix of the English version were also listed on Amazon.

"Maybe" was confirmed as the song to represent San Marino on 14 March 2014 at the programme, hosted by Alessandro Capicchioni and broadcast on SMtv San Marino as well as online via the broadcaster's website smtvsanmarino.sm and the official Eurovision Song Contest website eurovision.tv. Monetta and composer of the song Ralph Siegel were also in attendance for the event. Both English and Italian versions of the song were composed by Siegel with lyrics by Mauro Balestri. Siegel had previously composed 22 Eurovision entries for various countries, including the previous two Sammarinese entries all performed by Monetta. Siegel and Balestri began writing songs together in July 2013, for which Monetta recorded demos in Forte dei Marmi and at the Olympia Studio in Munich. Monetta stated during her interview with ESCToday that she opted to perform in English so that the song could be more broadly understood. The remaining songs that were under consideration were released as part of Monetta's third studio album Sensibilit (2014).

=== Promotion ===
To promote the entry, a music video for both "Maybe" and "Forse" were released as part of the song's presentation on 14 March 2014. Directed by Michele Massari, the video was filmed in the SMRTV studio and at a beach in Rimini, Italy. Monetta also embarked on a promotional tour in the lead up the Eurovision Song Contest, appearing on 5 April 2014 in the sixth annual Eurovision in Concert series, an event held at club Melkweg in Amsterdam, Netherlands that was staged to serve as a preview party for the year's entries. She also traveled to Moscow in Russia and Brighton and London of the United Kingdom.

== At Eurovision ==
The Eurovision Song Contest 2014 took place at B&W Hallerne in Copenhagen, Denmark. It consisted of two semi-finals held on 6 and 8 May, respectively, and the grand final on 10 May 2014. According to the Eurovision rules, all participating countries, except the host nation and the "Big Five", consisting of France, Germany, Italy, Spain and the UK, were required to qualify from one of the two semi-finals to compete for the grand final; the top 10 countries from the respective semi-finals would proceed to the final.

On 20 January 2014, an allocation draw was held at Copenhagen City Hall that placed each country into one of the two semi-finals, with San Marino being placed into the second half of the first semi-final. Once all of the competing songs for the Eurovision Song Contest 2014 had been released, the running order for the semi-finals was decided by the producers of the event rather than through another draw. On 24 March, the running order was published, with the nation assigned position 12, following Moldova and preceding Portugal.

=== Performances ===
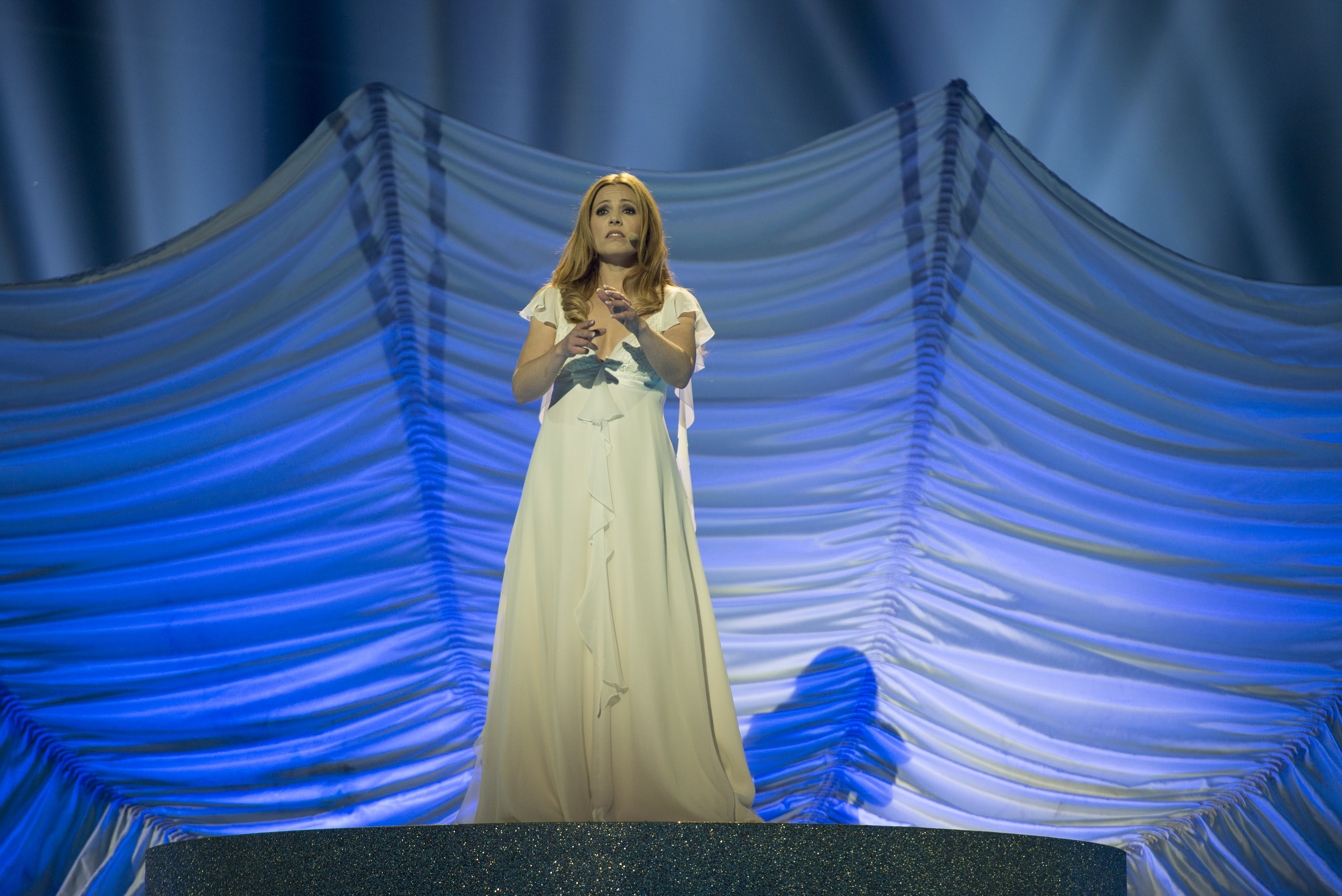
Valentina Monetta performing "Maybe" in the 2014 contest, held in Copenhagen, Denmark.

Monetta performed "Maybe" in the first semi-final on 6 May 2014, appearing 12th out of the 16 countries. Her performance was introduced by a 40-second-long postcard shot at San Marino's Torraccia airfield. On stage, Monetta was joined by four backing vocalists and accompanied on piano by composer Siegel. The performance featured Monetta standing in a white dress on a glittery gold circular platform with a fan-like cloth arrangement behind her. Choreography for the performance was handled by art director Fabrizio Raggi, who also served in that role the previous year. At the end of voting, San Marino placed 10th with a score of 40 points, thus qualifying for the grand final.

During the winner's press conference for the first semi-final qualifiers, San Marino was allocated to compete in the second half of the grand final. Their qualification marked the first time the nation qualified for the grand final since their debut in the contest in 2008. In the grand final of the Eurovision Song Contest 2014, the producers of the show decided that San Marino would perform 25th, following the Netherlands and preceding the United Kingdom. In the grand final, held on 10 May, San Marino placed 24th out of the 26 participants, scoring 14 points. This placement marked the nation's highest placing in the contest to this point.

In San Marino, both of the semi-finals and the grand final were broadcast on SMRTV and Radio San Marino with commentary by Lia Fiorio and Gigi Restivo. An alternative broadcast of the semi-finals and the grand final were also available online on the SMRTV website with English commentary by John Kennedy O'Connor and Jamarie Milkovic.

=== Voting ===
Below is a breakdown of points awarded to and awarded by San Marino in the first semi-final and grand final of the Eurovision Song Contest 2014, respectively. The Sammarinese votes in the semi-final and the grand final were based solely on the jury's vote due to an insufficient number of votes cast during the televote period. The spokesperson revealing the result of the Sammarinese vote in the grand final was San Marino's representative in the Junior Eurovision Song Contest 2013, Michele Perniola.

==== Points awarded to San Marino ====
Points awarded to San Marino (Semi-final 1)
Score	Country
12 points	
10 points	
8 points	Albania
7 points	Hungary
6 points	Azerbaijan
5 points	
4 points	Iceland; Ukraine
3 points	Estonia; Russia
2 points	Armenia
1 point	Latvia; Moldova; Spain

Points awarded to San Marino (Final)
Score	Country
12 points	
10 points	
8 points	
7 points	
6 points	
5 points	
4 points	Hungary
3 points	Albania; Armenia; Azerbaijan
2 points	
1 point	Moldova

==== Points awarded by San Marino ====
Points awarded by San Marino (Semi-final 1)
Score	Country
12 points	Netherlands
10 points	Armenia
8 points	Hungary
7 points	Iceland
6 points	Azerbaijan
5 points	Albania
4 points	Ukraine
3 points	Sweden
2 points	Latvia
1 point	Belgium

Points awarded by San Marino (Final)
Score	Country
12 points	Azerbaijan
10 points	Sweden
8 points	Iceland
7 points	Hungary
6 points	Armenia
5 points	United Kingdom
4 points	Malta
3 points	Finland
2 points	Netherlands
1 point	Denmark

==== Detailed voting results ====
The following members comprised the Sammarinese jury:

- Sara Ghiotti (jury chairperson) – musician, speech therapist
- Lorenzo Salvatori (Irol) – rapper
- Andrea Gattei – DJ, composer
- Maria Ugolini – singer
- Paolo Macina – guitarist

Detailed voting results from San Marino (Semi-final 1)
R/O	Country	S. Ghiotti	Irol	A. Gattei	M. Ugolini	P. Macina	Jury Rank	Points
01	Armenia	7	1	3	2	3	2	10
02	Latvia	12	5	9	8	13	9	2
03	Estonia	8	15	10	13	12	13	
04	Sweden	6	9	4	7	7	8	3
05	Iceland	13	3	6	5	1	4	7
06	Albania	4	8	5	3	9	6	5
07	Russia	10	14	11	12	11	12	
08	Azerbaijan	1	6	7	1	14	5	6
09	Ukraine	3	7	12	9	2	7	4
10	Belgium	9	12	8	11	15	10	1
11	Moldova	11	13	15	15	6	14	
12	San Marino							
13	Portugal	14	11	14	14	8	15	
14	Netherlands	2	4	1	4	5	1	12
15	Montenegro	15	10	13	10	10	11	
16	Hungary	5	2	2	6	4	3	8

Detailed voting results from San Marino (Final)
R/O	Country	S. Ghiotti	Irol	A. Gattei	M. Ugolini	P. Macina	Jury Rank	Points
01	Ukraine	10	20	16	14	4	13	
02	Belarus	21	21	10	21	25	22	
03	Azerbaijan	3	3	1	7	3	1	12
04	Iceland	2	6	9	5	2	3	8
05	Norway	19	14	8	13	7	12	
06	Romania	24	25	23	24	23	25	
07	Armenia	9	1	15	4	1	5	6
08	Montenegro	8	13	19	18	18	18	
09	Poland	25	23	24	25	6	23	
10	Greece	23	16	25	23	9	21	
11	Austria	5	22	13	3	24	14	
12	Germany	12	5	14	9	20	11	
13	Sweden	1	4	6	1	10	2	10
14	France	11	15	21	20	15	19	
15	Russia	22	24	20	22	22	24	
16	Italy	20	10	17	17	12	17	
17	Slovenia	15	18	22	19	17	20	
18	Finland	17	17	5	8	5	8	3
19	Spain	18	12	12	16	16	16	
20	Switzerland	16	9	18	11	19	15	
21	Hungary	6	2	7	6	8	4	7
22	Malta	14	11	2	10	11	7	4
23	Denmark	4	19	3	12	21	10	1
24	Netherlands	13	7	4	15	13	9	2
25	San Marino							
26	United Kingdom	7	8	11	2	14	6	5
