= Mia Dimšić discography =

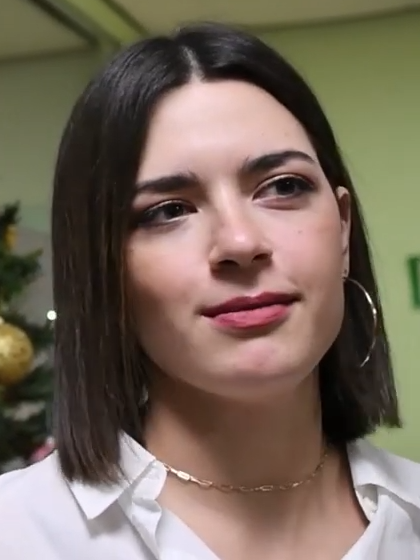
- Dimšić in 2021
- Studio albums: 3
- EPs: 1
- Singles: 22
- Music videos: 19

Croatian singer-songwriter Mia Dimšić has released three studio albums, one extended play (EP) and 18 singles.

Dimšić's debut studio album Život nije siv was released in March 2017 and peaked at number one on the Top of the Shops in Croatia. The album is certified gold in Croatia. The album's lead single "Život nije siv" peaked at number three on the Croatian HR Top 40 chart and spawned two number one singles; "Bezimeni" and "Sunce, oblak, vjetar". Dimšić released her second studio album Božićno jutro in November 2017 and peaked at number two in Croatia. "Cimet i čaj", the albums lead and most successful single peaked at number one in Croatia.

In December 2019, her third studio album, Sretan put, was released. It was her second album to debut at number one on the Croatian albums chart. The album produced three number one singles: "Ovaj grad", "Cesta do sna" and "Sva blaga ovog svijeta".

== Albums ==
=== Studio albums ===
Title	Details	Peak chart positions	Certifications
Title	Details	CRO	Certifications
Život nije siv	Released: 20 March 2017; Formats: Digital download, CD, streaming; Label: Croatia Records	1	CRO: Gold
Božićno jutro	Released: 29 November 2017; Formats: Digital download, CD, streaming; Label: Croatia Records	2	
Sretan put	Released: 6 December 2019; Formats: Digital download, CD, streaming; Label: Croatia Records	1	
Monologue	Released: 7 November 2023; Formats: Digital download, CD, streaming; Label: Croatia Records	1	
Društvena pravila	Released: 20 September 2024; Formats: Digital download, CD, streaming; Label: Croatia Records	2	

== Extended plays ==
Title	Details	Peak chart positions
Title	Details	CRO
Guilty Pleasure	Released: 28 April 2022; Formats: Digital download, CD, streaming; Label: Croatia Records	1

== Singles ==
=== As lead artist ===
Title	Year	Peak chart positions	Album
Title	Year	CRO Airplay	Album
"Budi mi blizu"	2015	—	Život nije siv
"Slobodna"	2015	21	Život nije siv
"Život nije siv"	2016	3	Život nije siv
"Sanjaj me"	2016	10	Život nije siv
"Bezimeni"	2017	1	Život nije siv
"Sunce, oblak, vjetar"	2017	1	Život nije siv
"Kiša"	2017	4	Život nije siv
"Cimet i čaj"	2017	1	Božićno jutro
"Do posljednjeg retka"	2018	2	Život nije siv
"Snježna ulica"	2018	4	Božićno jutro
"Ovaj grad"	2019	1	Sretan put
"Cesta do sna"	2019	1	Sretan put
"Sva blaga ovog svijeta" (with Marko Tolja)	2019	1	Sretan put
"Pomiče se sat"	2019	5	Sretan put
"Unatrag"	2020	4	Sretan put
"Pomalo slučajno"	2021	7	Sretan put
"Neki novi ljudi"	2021	6	Sretan put
"Guilty Pleasure" / "Netko drugi"	2022	1 (Note: As the HR Top 40 chart doesn't combine multiple versions of a song into one chart entry, the Croatian version of Guilty Pleasure titled "Netko drugi" charted separately at number fifteen.)	Monologue
"Stuck on You"	2022	—	Monologue
"Sunce moje"	2022	2	Društvena pravila
"Stranac kojeg znam"	2022	5	Društvena pravila
"Ništa ili sve"	2023	16	Društvena pravila
"Ajmo u đir" (with Neno Belan)	2023	3	Društvena pravila
"Društvena pravila" (with Vlatko Stefanovski)	2024	2	Društvena pravila
"—" denotes a single that did not chart or was not released in that territory.

=== As featured artist ===
Title	Year	Peak chart positions	Album
Title	Year	CRO	Album
"Sve sam znala i prije" (with Lorenzo)	2017	8	I Am Lorenzo
"Gledaj me u oči" (with the Frajle)	2020	14	non-album single

== Videography ==
=== Music videos ===
Title	Year	Director(s)	Ref.
As lead artist
"Budi mi blizu"	2015	Marko Zeljković	
"Slobodna"	2015	Boris Sekulić	
"Život nije siv"	2016	Boris Sekulić	
"Sanjaj me"	2016	Boris Sekulić	
"Bezimeni"	2017	Marko Zeljković	
"Sunce, oblak, vjetar"	2017	Boris Sekulić	
"Kiša"	2017	Boris Sekulić	
"Cimet i čaj"	2017	Unknown	
"Do posljednjeg retka"	2018	Boris Sekulić	
"Snježna ulica"	2018	Marko Zeljković	
"Ovaj grad"	2019	Boris Sekulić	
"Cesta do sna"	2019	Marko Zeljković	
"Sva blaga ovog svijeta"	2019	Artem Dushkin	
"Pomiče se sat"	2019	Boris Sekulić	
"Pomalo slučajno"	2021	Boris Sekulić	
"Neki novi ljudi"	2021	Artem Dushkin	
"Guilty Pleasure" / "Netko drugi"	2022	Artem Dushkin	
As featured artist
"Sve sam znala i prije" (with Lorenzo)	2017	Igor Ivanović, Sandra Mihaljević	
"Gledaj me u oči" (with the Frajle)	2020	Igor Ivanović, Sandra Mihaljević	
