= Eric Vidović =

Croatian singer (born 2000)

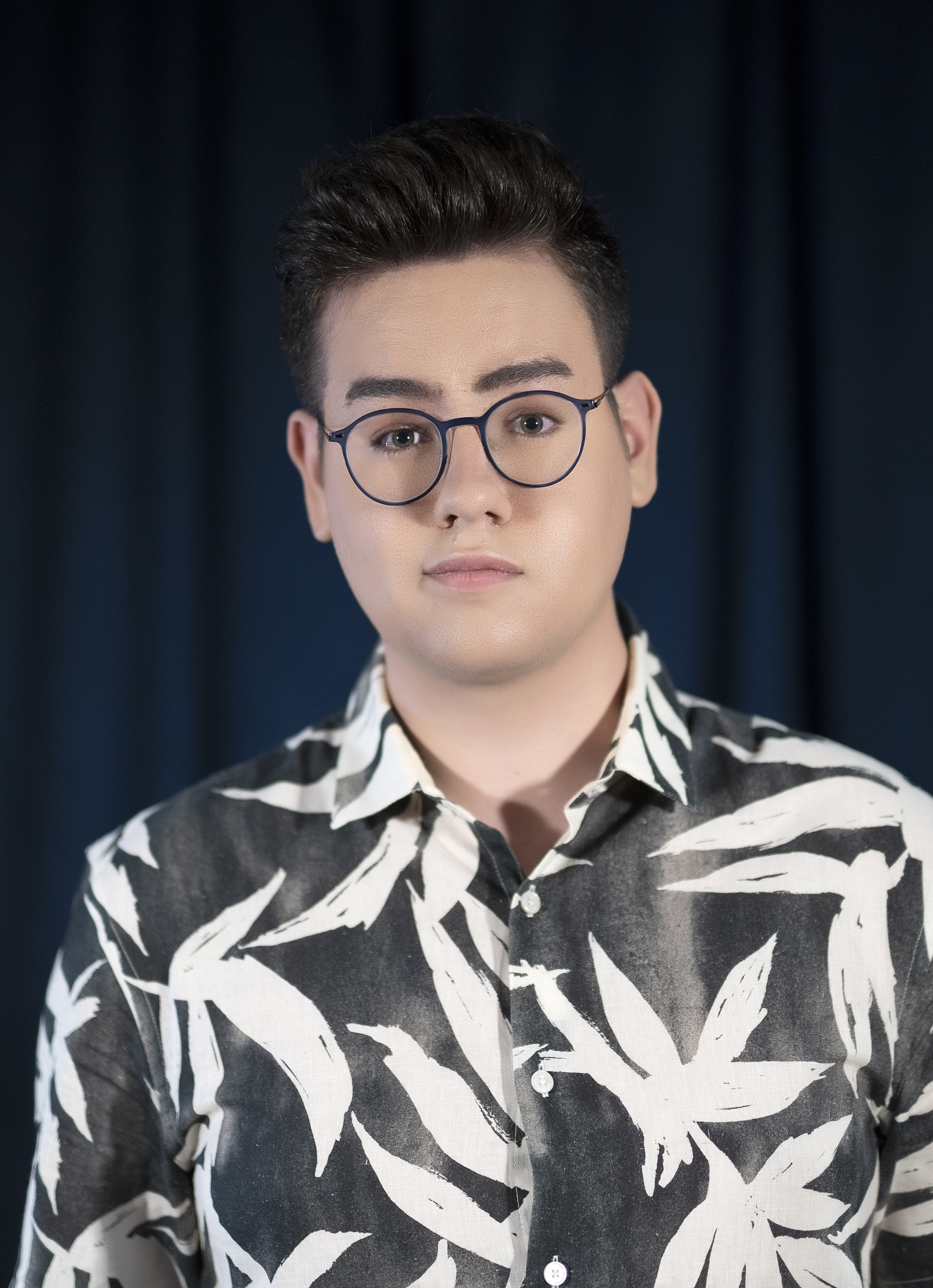
- ERIC in 2021

Background information
- Also known as: ERIC
- Born: 16 December 2000 (age 25); Koprivnica, Croatia
- Genres: Pop
- Occupations: Singer; songwriter
- Years active: 2019–present
- Label: Universal Music Croatia Republic Records

Eric Vidović (born 16 December 2000), known mononymously as Eric, is a Croatian singer.

== Career ==
Starting 13 December 2019, Eric Vidović appeared as a contestant on the third season of the reality talent show The Voice Hrvatska. On the first show, Vidović sang Hozier's song "Take Me to Church". Out of four judges Massimo Savić turned around. As Savić was the only judge to turn around, Vidović was automatically allocated into his team. On 11 January 2020 during the Knockout Stage Vidović sang "I'm Not the Only One" by Sam Smith and failed to advance to the Battle Round.

In early 2020, Vidović signed a record deal with Universal Music Croatia. On 13 November 2020 his debut single, "Najljepši dar (Božićna)", was released. In December 2020, Vidović was announced as one of the 14 finalists for Dora 2021, the national contest in Croatia to select the country's Eurovision Song Contest 2021 entry. He performed the song "Reci mi" and placed tenth with a total of 45 points. His debut studio album I Am Eric was released on 18 June 2021, and is distributed in USA via Republic Records. For his debut album he got positive critics from Croatian media saying "From romantic ballads to dance treats – this album has it all. Polished to the last pop fantastic detail", "For the first time, Eric wrote not only a very good 'letter of intent', but also delivered a top pop product to the audience, which can easily be added to European rankings. The devil will know, maybe we just got Mate Rimac in the pop category", "The album abounds with potential hits that would likely occupy very high positions on numerous top charts around the world if it manages to somehow reach a global audience."

On 17 December 2021, Vidović was announced as one of the acts to perform at Dora 2022 with the song "I Found You". Speaking about the meaning of the song, Vidović mentioned that the song is about a girl who doesn't remember who you are, but approaches the subject with a positive spin.

== Discography ==
=== Studio albums ===
Title	Details	Peak chart positions
Title	Details	CRO
I Am Eric	Released: 18 June 2021; Label: Universal Music Hrvatska; Formats: Audio CD, Digital download, streaming	1

=== Singles ===
Title	Year	Peak chart positions	Album
Title	Year	CRO	Album
"Najljepši dar (Božićna)" / "Best Present (This Christmas)"	2020	26	Non-album single
"Not Gonna Let Go"	2021	10	I Am Eric
"Reci mi" / "Tell Me"	2021	17	I Am Eric
"Confidence"	2021	—	I Am Eric
"No Good"	2021	36	I Am Eric
"I Found You"	2022	22	Non-album single
"Feel You Close" (with Ivana Kindl)	2022	22	Non-album single
"Gdje je ta ljubav"	2023	23	Non-album single
"—" denotes releases that did not chart or were not released in that territory.

== Awards and nominations ==
Year	Association	Category	Nominee / work	Result	Ref.
2022	Porin	Best New Artist	Himself	Nominated	
2023	Porin	Best Vocal Collaboration	"Feel You Close"	Pending	
