= Croatia in the Eurovision Song Contest 2022 =

- Eurovision Song Contest 2022
- Country: Croatia
- Selection process: Dora 2022
- Selection date: 19 February 2022

Competing entry
- Song: "Guilty Pleasure"
- Artist: Mia Dimšić
- Songwriters: Mia Dimšić; Vjekoslav Dimter; Damir Bačić

Placement
- Semi-final result: Failed to qualify (11th)

Participation chronology

Croatia was represented at the Eurovision Song Contest 2022 with the song "Guilty Pleasure" performed by Mia Dimšić. The Croatian broadcaster Croatian Radiotelevision (HRT) organised the national final Dora 2022 to select the Croatian entry for the 2022 contest. Fourteen entries competed in the national final on 19 February 2022 and "Guilty Pleasure" performed by Mia Dimšić was selected as the winner following the combination of votes from ten regional juries and a public televote.

Croatia was drawn to compete in the first semi-final of the Eurovision Song Contest which took place on 10 May 2022. Performing during the show in position 11, "Guilty Pleasure" was not announced among the top 10 entries of the first semi-final and therefore did not qualify to compete in the final. It was later revealed that Croatia placed eleventh out of the 17 participating countries in the semi-final with 75 points.

== Background ==
Prior to the 2022 contest, Croatia had participated in the Eurovision Song Contest twenty-six times since its first entry in 1993. The nation's best result in the contest was fourth, which it achieved on two occasions: in 1996 with the song "Sveta ljubav" performed by Maja Blagdan and in 1999 with the song "Marija Magdalena" performed by Doris Dragović. Following the introduction of semi-finals in 2004, Croatia had thus far featured in seven finals. Since 2018, the Croatian entries failed to qualify from the semi-finals; the last time Croatia competed in the final was in 2017 with the song "My Friend" performed by Jacques Houdek. In 2021, Croatia failed to qualify to the final with Albina and the song "Tick-Tock".

The Croatian national broadcaster, Croatian Radiotelevision (HRT), broadcasts the event within Croatia and organises the selection process for the nation's entry. HRT confirmed Croatia's participation in the 2022 Eurovision Song Contest on 13 September 2021. Between 1993 and 2011, HRT organised the national final Dora in order to select the Croatian entry for the Eurovision Song Contest. In 2012 and 2013, the broadcaster opted to internally select the entry. After missing the contest in 2014 and 2015, the Croatian broadcaster continued the internal selection procedure between 2016 and 2018. Since 2019, HRT has used Dora to select Croatia's entry, a method that was continued for their 2022 participation.

== Before Eurovision ==
=== Dora 2022 ===
Dora 2022 was the twenty-third edition of the Croatian national selection Dora which selected Croatia's entry for the Eurovision Song Contest 2022. The competition consisted of fourteen entries competing in one final on 19 February 2022 at the Marino Cvetković Sports Hall in Opatija, hosted by Duško Ćurlić, Elizabeta Brodić and 2018 Croatian Eurovision entrant Franka Batelić. The show was broadcast on HRT 1 as well as online via the broadcaster's YouTube channel and streaming service HRTi.

==== Competing entries ====
On 27 October 2021, HRT opened a submission period where artists and composers were able to submit their entries to the broadcaster with the deadline on 25 November 2021, which was later extended until 12 December 2021. 184 entries were received by the broadcaster during the submission period. A five-member expert committee consisting of Željko Mesar (HRT), Zlatko Turkalj (HRT), Robert Urlić (HRT), Antonela Doko (HGU) and Aljoša Šerić (HDS) reviewed the received submissions and selected fourteen artists and songs for the competition. HRT announced the competing entries on 17 December 2021. The running order of the final was determined during the HRT 1 show Kod Nas Doma, hosted by Branimir Mihaljević and Barbara Kolar.

Artist	Song	Songwriter(s)
Bernarda	"Here for Love"	Bernarda Brunović, Adriana Pupavac, Andreas Björkman, Karl Persson, Jonas Ekdahl, Aidan O'Connor
Elis Lovrić	"No War"	Anthony Kukuljan, Elis Lovrić, Sandi Bratonja
Ella Orešković	"If You Walk Away"	Siniša Reljić
Eric Vidović	"I Found You"	Eric Vidović, Filip Vidović, Gordan Dragić
Jessa	"My Next Mistake"	Silvio Pasarić, Jessica Atlić-McColgan
Marko Bošnjak	"Moli za nas"	Vlaho Arbulić, Mihovil Šoštarić
Mia Dimšić	"Guilty Pleasure"	Mia Dimšić, Vjekoslav Dimter, Damir Bačić
Mia Negovetić	"Forgive Me (Oprosti)"	Andreas Stone Johansson, Denniz Jamm, Laurell Barker, Mia Negovetić
Mila Elegović	"Ljubav"	Bruno Krajcar
Roko Vušković	"Malo kasnije"	Predrag Martinjak, Roko Vušković, Jan Šinjor Cvetković
Tia	"Voli me do neba"	Vlaho Arbulić, Mihovil Šoštarić
Tina Vukov	"Hideout"	Rejhan Okanović, Tomislav Gojanović, Josipa Vujević
ToMa	"In the Darkness"	Adriana Pupavac, Andreas Björkman, Tomislav Marić, Aidan O'Connor, Samuel Runsteen
Zdenka Kovačiček	"Stay on the Bright Side"	Adi Karas, Elvis Sršen NoA, Zvonimir Bajević, Jurica Hotko

==== Final ====
The final took place on 19 February 2022. The winner, "Guilty Pleasure" performed by Mia Dimšić, was determined by a 50/50 combination of votes from ten regional juries and a public televote. The viewers and the juries each had a total of 580 points to award. Each jury group distributed their points as follows: 1-8, 10 and 12 points. The viewer vote was based on the percentage of votes each song achieved through telephone and SMS voting. For example, if a song gained 10% of the viewer vote, then that entry would be awarded 10% of 580 points rounded to the nearest integer: 58 points. Ties were decided in favour of the entry ranked higher by the public televote. In addition to the performances of the competing entries, host Franka Batelić and 2021 Croatian Eurovision entrant Albina performed as the interval acts during the show.

Final – 19 February 2022
R/O	Artist	Song	Jury	Televote				Total	Place
R/O	Artist	Song	Jury	Phone	SMS	Total	Points	Total	Place
1	Mila Elegović	"Ljubav"	3	1,145	246	1,391	12	15	14
2	Mia Negovetić	"Forgive Me (Oprosti)"	81	5,278	2,226	7,504	60	141	3
3	Marko Bošnjak	"Moli za nas"	71	7,161	6,342	13,503	108	179	2
4	Jessa	"My Next Mistake"	8	794	332	1,126	9	17	12
5	Zdenka Kovačiček	"Stay on the Bright Side"	31	1,691	812	2,503	20	51	9
6	Tina Vukov	"Hideout"	33	2,130	726	2,856	23	56	8
7	Roko Vušković	"Malo kasnije"	8	717	356	1,073	9	17	13
8	Bernarda Brunović	"Here for Love"	64	3,710	2,201	5,911	47	111	4
9	Eric Vidović	"I Found You"	59	3,610	1,797	5,407	43	102	5
10	ToMa	"In the Darkness"	43	1,856	1,203	3,059	25	68	7
11	Elis Lovrić	"No War"	64	2,350	1,382	3,732	30	94	6
12	Ella Orešković	"If You Walk Away"	11	1,466	643	2,109	17	28	10
13	Tia	"Voli me do neba"	13	832	525	1,357	11	24	11
14	Mia Dimšić	"Guilty Pleasure"	91	13,388	7,271	20,659	166	257	1

Detailed Regional Jury Votes
R/O	Song	Rijeka	Pula	Osijek	Varaždin and Čakovec	Split	Vukovar	Knin and Šibenik	Zadar	Dubrovnik	Zagreb	Total
1	"Ljubav"		1								2	3
2	"Forgive Me (Oprosti)"	7	6	6	5	10	10	12	12	7	6	81
3	"Moli za nas"	2	4	8	7	12	12	8	2	6	10	71
4	"My Next Mistake"		2			3			3			8
5	"Stay on the Bright Side"	3	5	2	4		3	4	5	5		31
6	"Hideout"	6	3	7		1	1	5	1	4	5	33
7	"Malo kasnije"						5	1		2		8
8	"Here for Love"	12	7	1	6	7	6	7	8	3	7	64
9	"I Found You"	10	12		3	6	4	3	6	12	3	59
10	"In The Darkness"	4		4	8	4	7		4		12	43
11	"No War"	5	8	10	10	2	2	6	10	10	1	64
12	"If You Walk Away"	1		3	2	5						11
13	"Voli me do neba"			5	1			2		1	4	13
14	"Guilty Pleasure"	8	10	12	12	8	8	10	7	8	8	91

Members of the Jury
Jury	Members
Zagreb	Željko Barba – HRT; Emilija Kokić – HGU; Nika Turković – HDS
Vukovar	Zvonimir Mandić – HRT; Dominik Blaževac – HGU; Goran Dragaš – HDS
Varaždin and Čakovec	Danijela Bratić-Herceg – HRT; Bojan Jambrošić – HGU; Sandi Cenov – HDS
Rijeka	Albert Petrović – HRT; Ivan Pešut – HGU; Ivan Popeskić – HDS
Pula	Serđo Valić – HRT; Gabrijela Galant Jelenić – HGU; Marko Matijević Sekul – HDS
Osijek	Marina Ban – HRT; Goran Bošković – HGU; Mario Vestić – HDS
Zadar	Toni Dunatov – HRT; Jure Brkljača – HGU; Vjekoslav Šuljić – HDS
Knin and Šibenik	Nenad Tisaj – HRT; Ivana Lovrić – HGU; Branimir Bubica – HDS
Split	Želimir Škarpona – HRT; Leo Škaro – HGU; Luka Mrduljaš – HDS
Dubrovnik	Milivoj Kravarović – HRT; Maja Grgić – HGU; Damir Butigan – HDS

=== Preparation ===
In late March, Mia Dimšić filmed the music video for "Guilty Pleasure" in Osijek, which was directed by Artem Dushkin and the company Lumiere Productions. The music video was released to the public on 1 April. An alternative video featuring the Croatian version of the song entitled "Netko drugi" was also released.

=== Promotion ===
Mia Dimšić made several appearances across Europe to specifically promote "Guilty Pleasure" as the Croatian Eurovision entry. On 3 April, Mia Dimšić performed during the London Eurovision Party, which was held at the Hard Rock Hotel in London, United Kingdom and hosted by Paddy O'Connell and SuRie. On 7 April, Dimšić performed during the Israel Calling event held at the Menora Mivtachim Arena in Tel Aviv, Israel. On 9 April, Dimšić performed during the Eurovision in Concert event which was held at the AFAS Live venue in Amsterdam, Netherlands and hosted by Cornald Maas and Edsilia Rombley. On 16 April, Dimšić performed during the PrePartyES 2022 event which was held at the Sala La Riviera venue in Madrid, Spain and hosted by Ruth Lorenzo. In addition to her international appearances, Mia Dimšić performed during the Adriatic PreParty which was held online and organised by Hrvatski Eurovizijski Klub.

== At Eurovision ==
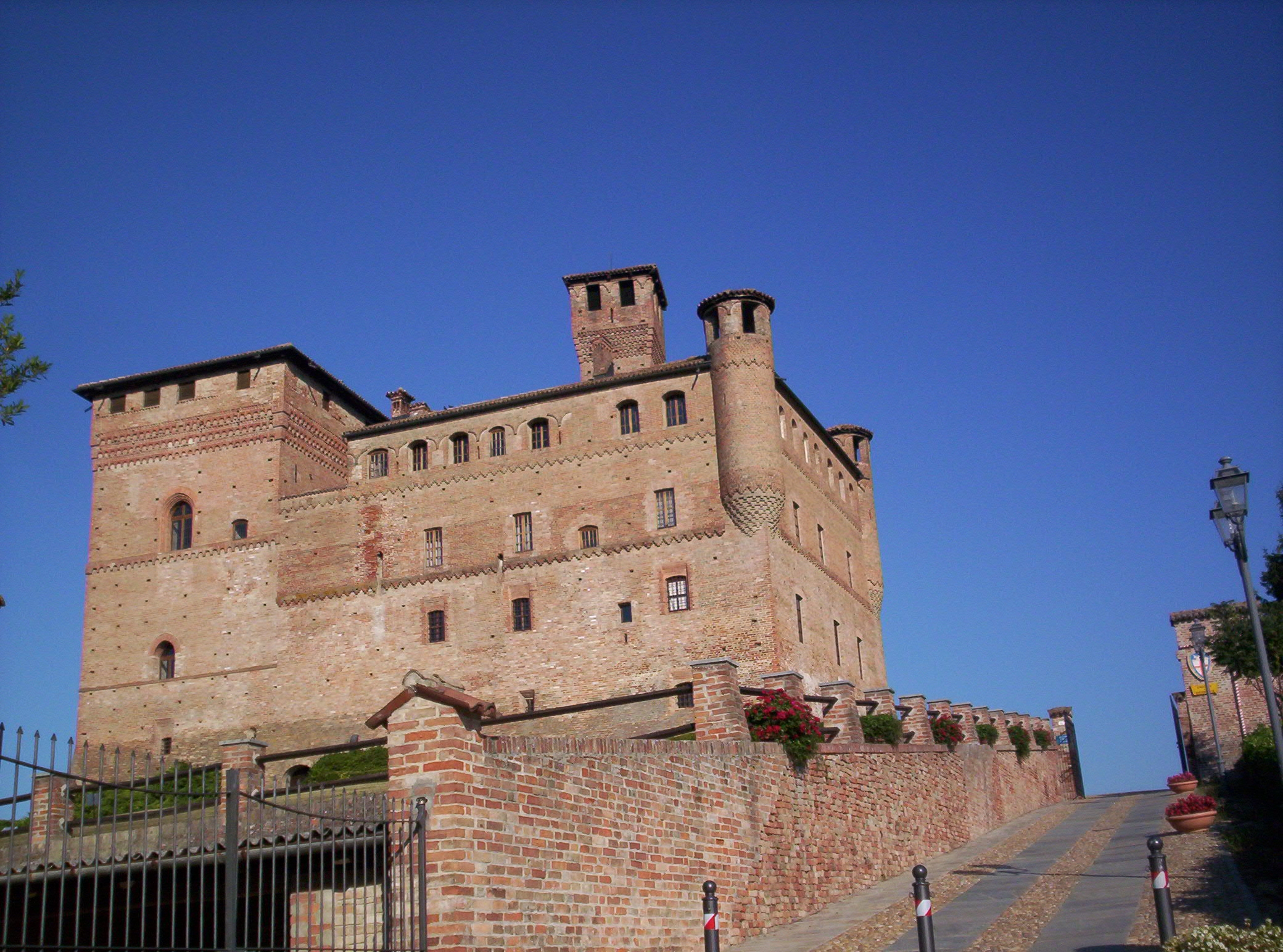
A video postcard introduced Mia's performance in the first semi-final of the Eurovision Song Contest 2022. The postcard was filmed in the Italian commune of Grinzane Cavour in the Province of Cuneo and featured virtual projections of Mia across the location.

According to Eurovision rules, all nations with the exceptions of the host country and the "Big Five" (France, Germany, Italy, Spain and the United Kingdom) are required to qualify from one of two semi-finals in order to compete for the final; the top ten countries from each semi-final progress to the final. The European Broadcasting Union (EBU) split up the competing countries into six different pots based on voting patterns from previous contests, with countries with favourable voting histories put into the same pot. On 25 January 2022, an allocation draw was held which placed each country into one of the two semi-finals, as well as which half of the show they would perform in. Croatia was placed into the first semi-final, which was held on 10 May 2022, and was scheduled to perform in the second half of the show.

Once all the competing songs for the 2022 contest had been released, the running order for the semi-finals was decided by the shows' producers rather than through another draw, so that similar songs were not placed next to each other. Croatia was set to perform in position 11, following the entry from Portugal and before the entry from Denmark.

The two semi-finals and the final were broadcast in Croatia on HRT 1 with commentary by Duško Ćurlić. The three shows were also broadcast via radio on HR 2 with commentary by Zlatko Turkalj. The Croatian spokesperson, who announced the top 12-point score awarded by the Croatian jury during the final, was Ivan Dorian Molnar.

=== Semi-final ===
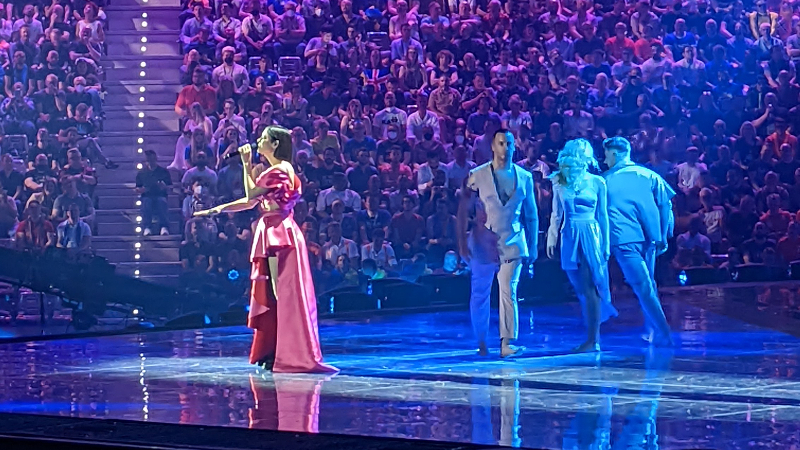
Mia Dimšić performing during the first semi-final

Mia Dimšić took part in technical rehearsals on 1 and 5 May, followed by dress rehearsals on 9 and 10 May. This included the jury show on 9 May where the professional juries of each country watched and voted on the competing entries.

The Croatian performance featured Mia Dimšić in a pink silk dress and black boots designed by Ivan Tandarić and Aleksandar Šekuljica. The performance began with Dimšić alone on stage, while three dancers appeared by the end of the first chorus. The stage colours were predominantly pink and blue and Dimšić performed the bridge and final chorus of "Guilty Pleasure" in the Croatian language. The Croatian performance was choreographed by Igor Barberić. The dancers that joined Mia Dimšić on stage were Rebecca Krajnović, Roman Vrančić and Danon Vrkić, while two off-stage backing vocalists that joined Dimšić were: Bruna Oberan and Josip Palameta.

At the end of the show, Croatia was not announced among the top 10 entries in the first semi-final and therefore failed to qualify to compete in the final. It was later revealed that Croatia placed eleventh in the semi-final, receiving a total of 75 points: 33 points from the televoting and 42 points from the juries.

=== Voting ===
Below is a breakdown of points awarded to Croatia during the first semi-final. Voting during the three shows involved each country awarding two sets of points from 1-8, 10 and 12: one from their professional jury and the other from televoting. The exact composition of the professional jury, and the results of each country's jury and televoting were released after the final; the individual results from each jury member were also released in an anonymised form. The Croatian jury consisted of Dinko Komadina, Mia Elizabeta Negovetić, Nela, Pegi, and Saša Lozar. In the first semi-final, Croatia finished in eleventh place out of seventeen entries, marking the country's fourth consecutive non-qualification from the semi-finals. The first semi-final saw Croatia receive twelve points from Slovenia in the televote. Over the course of the contest, Croatia awarded its 12 points to Portugal (jury) and Ukraine (televote) in the first semi-final and to Serbia in both the jury and televote in the final.

==== Points awarded to Croatia ====
Points awarded to Croatia (Semi-final 1)
Score	Televote	Jury
12 points	Slovenia	
10 points		
8 points		Greece; Slovenia
7 points		
6 points	Albania; Austria; Switzerland	Bulgaria
5 points		
4 points		Armenia; Italy
3 points		Albania; Austria; Netherlands; Ukraine
2 points	Bulgaria	
1 point	Portugal	

==== Points awarded by Croatia ====
Points awarded by Croatia (Semi-final 1)
Score	Televote	Jury
12 points	Ukraine	Portugal
10 points	Moldova	Lithuania
8 points	Slovenia	Greece
7 points	Norway	Ukraine
6 points	Lithuania	Switzerland
5 points	Armenia	Slovenia
4 points	Austria	Iceland
3 points	Netherlands	Denmark
2 points	Albania	Netherlands
1 point	Portugal	Armenia

Points awarded by Croatia (Final)
Score	Televote	Jury
12 points	Serbia	Serbia
10 points	Ukraine	Portugal
8 points	Moldova	Ukraine
7 points	Spain	Lithuania
6 points	Italy	Spain
5 points	Norway	Sweden
4 points	Sweden	Italy
3 points	Lithuania	Greece
2 points	Estonia	Netherlands
1 point	France	Switzerland

==== Detailed voting results ====
The following members comprised the Croatian jury:

- Dinko Komadina - TV producer, broadcaster
- Mia Elizabeta Negovetić - Singer-songwriter, participated in Dora 2022
- Nela – Performer, musician
- Pegi – Singer-songwriter
- Saša Lozar – Singer-songwriter

Detailed voting results from Croatia (Semi-final 1)
R/O	Country	Jury							Televote	
R/O	Country	Juror 1	Juror 2	Juror 3	Juror 4	Juror 5	Rank	Points	Rank	Points
01	Albania	14	16	16	9	12	14		9	2
02	Latvia	12	11	11	11	10	11		13	
03	Lithuania	2	3	1	4	2	2	10	5	6
04	Switzerland	5	1	7	5	16	5	6	16	
05	Slovenia	6	10	4	8	4	6	5	3	8
06	Ukraine	3	7	6	3	7	4	7	1	12
07	Bulgaria	15	15	15	15	14	16		14	
08	Netherlands	7	4	5	12	15	9	2	8	3
09	Moldova	16	12	14	13	9	13		2	10
10	Portugal	1	5	3	2	1	1	12	10	1
11	Croatia									
12	Denmark	9	6	8	6	6	8	3	12	
13	Austria	13	13	13	16	13	15		7	4
14	Iceland	8	8	9	7	3	7	4	15	
15	Greece	4	2	2	1	5	3	8	11	
16	Norway	11	14	12	14	8	12		4	7
17	Armenia	10	9	10	10	11	10	1	6	5

Detailed voting results from Croatia (Final)
R/O	Country	Jury							Televote	
R/O	Country	Juror 1	Juror 2	Juror 3	Juror 4	Juror 5	Rank	Points	Rank	Points
01	Czech Republic	19	14	12	17	9	15		20	
02	Romania	23	22	8	23	11	16		15	
03	Portugal	2	11	2	1	2	2	10	12	
04	Finland	24	21	24	24	21	25		16	
05	Switzerland	12	7	10	9	25	10	1	23	
06	France	14	15	23	25	15	22		10	1
07	Norway	6	9	13	20	13	11		6	5
08	Armenia	22	8	16	16	19	17		19	
09	Italy	7	16	11	3	4	7	4	5	6
10	Spain	5	2	6	11	6	5	6	4	7
11	Netherlands	8	6	7	5	24	9	2	11	
12	Ukraine	3	5	9	4	5	3	8	2	10
13	Germany	21	3	20	19	20	12		17	
14	Lithuania	4	10	4	8	3	4	7	8	3
15	Azerbaijan	17	25	19	10	8	13		25	
16	Belgium	20	24	17	18	23	23		18	
17	Greece	10	12	5	6	7	8	3	21	
18	Iceland	15	13	18	14	14	18		24	
19	Moldova	25	23	25	22	16	24		3	8
20	Sweden	11	4	1	7	22	6	5	7	4
21	Australia	13	18	22	13	17	20		22	
22	United Kingdom	16	17	14	12	18	19		14	
23	Poland	9	19	15	15	12	14		13	
24	Serbia	1	1	3	2	1	1	12	1	12
25	Estonia	18	20	21	21	10	21		9	2
