= Tina Vukov =

- Born: 22 December 1988 (age 37); Rijeka, SR Croatia, SFR Yugoslavia
- Genres: Pop
- Occupations: Singer; songwriter
- Instruments: Vocals; piano
- Years active: 2002–present
- Label: Croatia Records

Tina Vukov (born 22 December 1988) is a Croatian singer.

== Music career ==
At the age of fourteen Vukov signed a record deal with Croatia Records. In early 2004 she participated at Dora 2004, the selection show to decide Croatia's Eurovision Song Contest 2004 entry with the song "Tuga dolazi kasnije". Placing eighth in the first semi-final she failed to advance to the final. Two years later, in 2006, Vukov participated at Dora 2006 with the song "Il treno per Genova". She placed first in the first semi-final and later placed third in the final. Later that year Vukov's debut album Tuga dolazi kasnije was released. Vukov participated at Dora for a third time in 2007 with the song "Tata". In the same year she won her first Porin Award in the Best Female Vocal Performance category for "Il treno per Genova".

On 17 December 2021, Vukov was announced as one of the acts to perform at Dora 2022 with the song "Hideout".

== Discography ==
=== Albums ===
Title	Details	Peak chart positions
Title	Details	CRO
Tuga dolazi kasnije	Released: 9 April 2006; Label: Croatia Records; Formats: CD, digital download	8
Što me čini sretnom	Released: 7 December 2021; Label: Croatia Records; Formats: CD, digital download	4

=== Singles ===
Title	Year	Peak chart positions	Album
Title	Year	CRO	Album
"Tuga dolazi kasnije"	2004	—	Tuga dolazi kasnije
"Il treno per Genova"	2006	—	Tuga dolazi kasnije
"Tata"	2007	—	Non-album singles
"Suicide Note"	2015	—	Non-album singles
"Još samo večeras"	2021	—	Što me čini sretnom
"Poljubac za zbogom"	2021	40	Što me čini sretnom
"Taj beguin"	2021	—	Što me čini sretnom
"Svemu dođe kraj"	2021	—	Što me čini sretnom
"Što me čini sretnom"	2021	—	Što me čini sretnom
"Hideout"	2022	—	Dora 2022
"—" denotes releases that did not chart or were not released in that territory.
