= Mia Dimšić =

Croatian singer

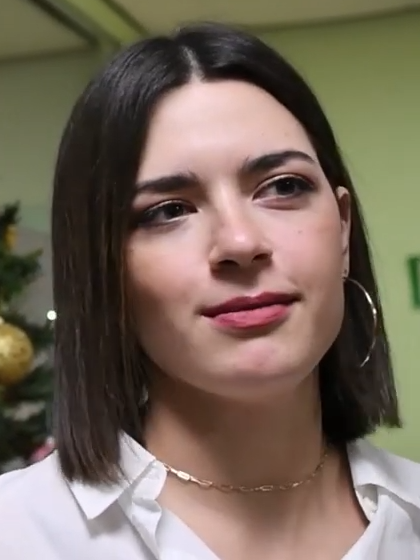
- Dimšić in 2021

Background information
- Born: 7 November 1992 (age 33); Osijek, Croatia
- Genres: Pop; country pop; folk pop
- Occupation: Singer
- Years active: 2015–present
- Label: Croatia Records

Mia Dimšić (born 7 November 1992) is a Croatian pop singer. She represented Croatia in the Eurovision Song Contest 2022 with the song "Guilty Pleasure" which did not qualify for the Grand Final.

== Early life and education ==
Dimšić was born on 7 November 1992 in Osijek. She holds a MA degree in translation studies from the Faculty of Arts of the University of Osijek.

== Career ==
Dimšić started her career in 2014, when tamburica band Džentlmeni invited her to accompany them during their USA and Canada tour for the Croatian diaspora. "Budi mi blizu" was released on 12 October 2015 as Dimšić's first single. "Život nije siv" was released on 7 July 2016 as her debut's album lead single. Dimšić's debut album Život nije siv was released on 20 March 2017. Život nije siv peaked at number one on the Croatian Albums Chart. The album was eventually certified platinum in the country. Dimšić's second studio album and first Christmas record, Božićno jutro was released on 29 November 2017.

On 26 July 2019, Dimšić released "Sva blaga ovog svijeta" with Croatian singer Marko Tolja, along with the music video. The song debuted at number twelve on the Croatian HR Top 40 chart and marks Dimšić's and Tolja's first collaboration. In August, "Sva blaga ovog svijeta" climbed to the number one position, making it Dimšić's sixth single to top the HR Top 40 chart as lead artist.

On 17 December 2021, Dimšić was announced as one of the fourteen participants in Dora 2022, the national contest in Croatia to select the country's Eurovision Song Contest 2022 entry, with the song "Guilty Pleasure". On 19 February 2022, she won Dora 2022, thus gaining the right to represent Croatia in the Eurovision Song Contest 2022 in Turin, Italy. At the Eurovision itself, she performed in the first semi-final, finishing 11th and thus failing to qualify to the final.

In October 2024, Dimšić was announced as one of four coaches on The Voice Kids Hrvatska, which premiered in December 2024. She returned for her second season in November 2025.

== Artistry ==
Dimšić cites Taylor Swift, Kacey Musgraves, Norah Jones, Willie Nelson and Alison Krauss as her musical influences. Out of Croatian artists, Dimšić was influenced by Neno Belan, Zlatan Stipišić Gibonni, Tedi Spalato, Oliver Dragojević and Hari Rončević.

Dimšić uses her life experiences as an inspiration in her work. Dimšić uses Gibson Hummingbird for most of her live performances.

== Discography ==
- Život nije siv (2017)
- Božićno jutro (2017)
- Sretan put (2019)
- Monologue (2023)
- Društvena pravila (2024)
- Negdje u ravnici (2026)

== Awards and nominations ==
| Year | Association | Category | Nominee / work | Result | Ref. |
|---|---|---|---|---|---|
| 2017 | Porin | Best Music Video | "Život nije siv" | Won | |
| 2018 | Porin | Album of the Year | Život nije siv | Won | |
| 2018 | Porin | Song of the Year | "Bezimeni" | Won | |
| 2018 | Porin | Pop-rock Album | Život nije siv | Won | |
| 2018 | Porin | Spiritual Album | Božićno jutro | Won | |
| 2019 | Cesarica | Song of the Year | "Sva blaga ovog svijeta" | Nominated | |
| 2020 | Music Awards Ceremony | Pop Collaboration of the Year | "Sva blaga ovog svijeta" | Nominated | |
| 2020 | Porin | Best Female Vocal Performance | "Ovaj grad" | Nominated | |
| 2020 | Porin | Best Vocal Collaboration | "Sva blaga ovog svijeta" | Won | |
| 2020 | Porin | Song of the Year | "Sva blaga ovog svijeta" | Nominated | |
| 2021 | Porin | Pop Album | Sretan put | Nominated | |
| 2021 | Top.HR Music Awards | Best Selling Domestic Album | Sretan put | Won | |
| 2023 | Porin | Song of the Year | "Guilty Pleasure" | Nominated | |
| 2023 | Cesarica | Song of the Year | "Guilty Pleasure" | Nominated | |
| 2024 | Porin | Album of the Year | Monologue | Nominated | |
| 2024 | Porin | Best Vocal Collaboration | "Ajmo u đir" | Nominated | |

Achievements
| Preceded by Albina with "Tick-Tock" | Croatia in the Eurovision Song Contest; 2022 | Succeeded by Let 3 with "Mama ŠČ!" |
