= Eurosong 70: Naši ljudi, naše pjesme =

- The title card for the series
- Genre: Documentary
- Written by: Nensi Profaca
- Directed by: Nensi Profaca
- Country of origin: Croatia
- Original language: Croatian
- No. of seasons: 1
- No. of episodes: 2

Production
- Producers: Denis Škroput; Jurica Bošković
- Editor: Antonia Petran
- Running time: 40 minutes
- Production company: Croatian Radiotelevision

Original release
- Network: HRT 1
- Release: 29 April – 6 May 2026

Related
- Eurovision Song Contest

Eurosong 70: Naši ljudi, naše pjesme (Croatian for 'Eurosong 70: Our people, our songs') is a Croatian two-part documentary television series created to commemorate the 70th anniversary of the Eurovision Song Contest. Produced by Croatian Radiotelevision (HRT), Croatia's participating broadcaster at the contest, it aired on 29 April and 6 May 2026 on HRT 1.

The series revisits Croatia's entries for the Eurovision Song Contest, as well as the Croatian performers who represented Yugoslavia in its earlier editions.

== Guests ==
=== Eurovision performers ===
- Baby Lasagna, Eurovision Song Contest 2024
- Boris Novković, Eurovision Song Contest 2005
- Danijela Martinović, Eurovision Song Contest 1995 and 1998
- Emilija Kokić, Eurovision Song Contest 1989 winner
- Tajči, Eurovision Song Contest 1990
- Jacques Houdek, Eurovision Song Contest 2017
- Tony Cetinski, Eurovision Song Contest 1994
- Zoran Prodanović, Eurovision Song Contest 2023

=== Other guests ===
- Duško Ćurlić, Eurovision commentator for HRT
- Fenksta, Dora 2024 and 2025 performer
- Ivana Prkić, eurosong.hr journalist
- Ksenija Urličić, head of Croatian delegation from 1993 to 2000
- Krešimir Sučević-Međeral
- Morana Zibar
- Tonči Huljić, songwriter
- Zrinko Tutić

== Episodes ==
No.	Title	Directed by	Original release date
1	"Part 1"	Nensi Profaca	29 April 2026
The first episode revisits Croatian singers who represented Yugoslavia at the contest, showcasing archive footage, as well as interviews with Emilija Kokić, Jacques Houdek and Tajči. A commentary by music critics and trivia experts Krešimir Sučević-Međeral and Morana Zibar is featured as well.
2	"Part 2"	Nensi Profaca	6 May 2026
The second episode features a review of Croatian entries from 1993 onward. Several performers that represented Croatia during this period provided a commentary.

== See also ==
- Eurovision Song Contest
- Croatia in the Eurovision Song Contest
- Yugoslavia in the Eurovision Song Contest
