= Albina Grčić =

Croatian singer (born 1999)

Albina
- Born: Albina Grčić; 6 February 1999 (age 27); Split, Croatia
- Genres: Christian music; pop (former)
- Occupation: Singer
- Instrument: Vocals
- Years active: 2019–present
- Label: Universal Music Croatia

Albina Grčić (Croatian pronunciation: [ǎlbiːna ɡr̩̂tʃitɕ]; born 6 February 1999), known professionally by the mononym Albina, is a Croatian singer. She began her career after participating in season three of The Voice Hrvatska where she finished third. She represented Croatia in the Eurovision Song Contest 2021 in Rotterdam with the song "Tick-Tock".

In 2025, Grčić announced that she was leaving the pop music industry in order to focus on religion, and would be continuing her music career as a Christian musician.

== Career ==
Grčić was born in Split, although her father Božinko "Kićo" hails from Dicmo and her mother Marija "Rina" is from Tijarica. She auditioned for the second season of X Factor Adria in Belgrade, Serbia by singing "Ako izgubim te ja" (If I Lose You) by Oliver Dragojević. Advancing to the next round, the production decided to form a girl group with Grčić as a member. She declined the offer and ended her participation at the show. Starting 7 December 2019, Albina Grčić appeared as a contestant on the third season of the reality talent show The Voice Hrvatska. On the first show, Grčić sang Laura Pausini's song "En cambio no" (Instead, No). Two judges, Vanna and Davor Gobac turned around with Grčić choosing Vanna as her coach. On 11 January 2020, during the Knockout Stage, Grčić sang "A Million Dreams" by Pink and advanced to the Battle Round. On 1 February 2020, in the Battle Round, Grčić's coach Vanna put her against fellow team member Filip Rudan, choosing that they both sing "Lovely", originally by Billie Eilish and Khalid. As a result, Rudan was chosen as the winner of the battle, leaving Grčić available to be saved. Coach Massimo Savić used his save on Grčić and she advanced into the live shows as a member of his team. On 8 February 2020, at the first live show, Grčić sang a rendition of Zlatan Stipišić Gibonni's song "Nisi više moja bol" (You're No Longer My Pain) and advanced to the semi-final. In the semi-final, on 15 February 2020, Grčić performed Coldplay's "Fix You" and advanced to the final. In the final, Grčić sang "Suze nam stale na put" (Tears Got in Our Way) along with her coach Savić, "Korake ti znam" (I Know Your Footsteps) by Maya Sar and re-sang her audition song "En cambio no". She placed third overall behind winner Vinko Ćemeraš and runner-up Rudan.

Immediately after coming third on The Voice, Grčić was signed to a record deal with Universal Music Croatia. On 16 October 2020 her debut single, "Imuna na strah" (Immune to Fear), was released. In December 2020, Grčić was announced as one of the 14 finalists for Dora 2021, the national contest in Croatia to select the country's Eurovision Song Contest 2021 entry. She performed the song "Tick-Tock" which was written by Branimir Mihaljević, Max Cinnamon and Tihana Buklijaš Bakić. At Dora 2021, she won both the jury and televote with a total of 198 points and went to represent Croatia in the Eurovision Song Contest 2021 in the Netherlands. Grčić performed in the first semi-final on 18 May 2021, but failed to qualify to the final, finishing 11th. Despite failing to qualify, the song became a hit in Croatia. On 25 February 2021, Grčić was nominated for Best New Artist at the 2021 edition of the Porin Awards, which she won at the awards ceremony on 6 June 2021.

On July 24 she informed her fans through Instagram about her new single called "La, La, Love", which was released on July 30. Later that year, on 26 November 2021, Grčić released her fourth single "Plači mila".

On 19 February 2022, during Dora 2022, she premiered her new single, "Noću". In early 2023, Grčić released two additional stand-alone singles, "27." and "Žar", a collaboration with Croatian singer Đana.

In 2025, Grčić announced that she was leaving the pop music industry in order to focus on religion, and would be continuing her music career as a Christian musician.

== Discography ==
=== Singles ===
Title	Year	Peak chart positions		Album or EP
Title	Year	CRO	LTU	Album or EP
"Imuna na strah"	2020	11	—	Non-album singles
"No More Tears"	2020	—	—	Non-album singles
"Tick-Tock"	2021	1	48	Non-album singles
"La La Love"	2021	2	—	Non-album singles
"Plači mila"	2021	12	—	Non-album singles
"Noću"	2022	4	—	Non-album singles
"27."	2023	18	—	Non-album singles
"Žar" (with Ðana)	2023	20	—	Non-album singles
"Grad sve zna"	2023	40	—	Non-album singles
"Strah"	2023	31	—	Non-album singles
"—" denotes a recording that did not chart or was not released in that territory.

== Awards and nominations ==
Year	Association	Category	Nominee / work	Result	Ref.
2021	Zlatni Studio	Best New Artist	"Imuna na strah"	Nominated	
2021	Porin	Best New Artist	Herself	Won	
2021	Cesarica	Song of the Year	"Tick-Tock"	Nominated	

Achievements
Preceded by Damir Kedžo with "Divlji vjetre"	Croatia in the Eurovision Song Contest; 2021	Succeeded by Mia Dimšić with "Guilty Pleasure"
