= Guilty Pleasure (Mia Dimšić song) =

2022 single by Mia Dimšić

Single by Mia Dimšić

from the album Monologue
- Released: 10 February 2022
- Length: 3:02
- Label: Croatia Records
- Songwriters: Mia Dimšić; Vjekoslav Dimter; Damir Bačić
- Producer: Damir Bačić

Mia Dimšić singles chronology
| "Neki novi ljudi" (2021) | "Guilty Pleasure" (2022) | "Netko drugi" (2022) |

Alternative cover
- Eurovision promo cover

Music video
- "Guilty Pleasure" on YouTube

Eurovision Song Contest 2022 entry
- Country: Croatia
- Languages: English, Croatian

Finals performance
- Semi-final result: 11th
- Semi-final points: 75

Entry chronology
- ◄ "Tick–Tock" (2021)
- "Mama ŠČ!" (2023) ►

"Guilty Pleasure" is a song by Croatian singer Mia Dimšić. The song represented Croatia in the Eurovision Song Contest 2022 in Turin after winning the pre-selection competition Dora 2022.

== Background and release ==
"Guilty Pleasure" was one of fourteen songs commissioned by HRT for Dora 2022, Croatia's national selection for the Eurovision Song Contest 2022. The song was composed by Damir Bačić, Vjekoslav Dimter and Dimšić herself. "Guilty Pleasure" premiered on 10 February 2022, ten days ahead of Dora 2022, Croatia's national selection for the Eurovision Song Contest 2022. The song became available through digital retailers and streaming services on 20 February 2022 through Croatia Records.

In an interview on RTL Danas, Dimšić cited Taylor Swift's 2020 albums Folklore and Evermore as inspirations for the song. However, Dimšić was widely accused of plagiarizing Swift's 2020 single "Willow", mostly by social media users, such as Twitter and TikTok. Dimšić denied the accusations in an interview with 24sata, but acknowledged the comparisons as a compliment since she is a great admirer of Swift. On 25 February 2022, during an Otvoreni Radio interview, Dimšić performed a mashup of her and Swift's songs, dubbing it "Guilty Willow". Following the plagiarism allegations, "Willow" entered Billboard's Croatia Songs chart at number nine on the issue dated 5 March 2022.

On 21 March 2022, during a radio interview, Dimšić premiered the Croatian version of the song titled "Netko drugi" (Someone Else) on a local HR 2 radio show Music Pub Zlatka Turkalja. The Croatian version was released on YouTube Music, Deezer and Apple Music on 23 March 2022.

== At Eurovision ==
=== National selection ===
On 27 October 2021, HRT opened a submission period for artists and composers to send their entries to the broadcaster until 25 November 2021, later extending the deadline until 12 December 2021. On 17 December 2021, Dimšić was announced as one of the fourteen participants in Dora 2022 with the song "Guilty Pleasure". On 24 January 2022, HRT hosted the running order allocation draw on the local TV show Kod Nas Doma with Branimir Mihaljević and Barbara Kolar as hosts. "Guilty Pleasure" was drawn to be performed 14th. In the final, held on 19 February 2022, she won the televote and jury vote, placing first with 257 points and thus earned the right to represent Croatia at the Eurovision Song Contest 2022.

=== In Turin ===
On 25 January 2022, an allocation draw was held which placed each country into one of the two semi-finals, as well as which half of the show they would perform in. Croatia was placed into the first semi-final, held on 10 May 2022, and performed in the second half of the show. Dimšić performed the song, with the bridge and final chorus in the Croatian language. It did not qualify for the grand final, finishing in 11th place with 75 points. This was the second consecutive time in which Croatia missed the finals after finishing 11th in its semi-final, "Tick-Tock" by Albina did the same in 2021.

== Charts ==
Chart performance for "Guilty Pleasure"
| Chart (2022) | Peak position |
|---|---|
| Croatia (HR Top 40) | 1 |
| Croatian Domestic Albums (HDU) | 1 |

== Release history ==
Release history and formats for "Guilty Pleasure"
| Region | Date | Format | Label | Ref. |
|---|---|---|---|---|
| Various | 20 February 2022 | Digital download; streaming | Croatia Records | |
