= Croatia in the Eurovision Song Contest =

- Eurovision Song Contest
- Participating broadcaster: Hrvatska radiotelevizija (HRT)

Participation summary
- Appearances: 31 (21 finals)
- First appearance: 1993
- Highest placement: 2nd: 2024
- Participation history: 1993; 1994; 1995; 1996; 1997; 1998; 1999; 2000; 2001; 2002; 2003; 2004; 2005; 2006; 2007; 2008; 2009; 2010; 2011; 2012; 2013; 2014; 2015; 2016; 2017; 2018; 2019; ~~2020~~; 2021; 2022; 2023; 2024; 2025; 2026

External links
- HRT page
- Croatia's page at Eurovision.com
- For the most recent participation see Croatia in the Eurovision Song Contest 2026

Croatia has been represented at the Eurovision Song Contest 31 times since making its debut at the 1993 contest. The Croatian participating broadcaster in the contest is Hrvatska radiotelevizija (HRT), which has selected its entrant through the Dora festival since 1993, excluding from 2012 to 2018. Croatia's best result in the contest is a second-place finish in 2024.

Croatia achieved six top ten results in seven years, with "Nostalgija" performed by Magazin and Lidija finishing sixth (1995), "Sveta ljubav" by Maja Blagdan fourth (1996), "Neka mi ne svane" by former Magazin member Danijela Martinović fifth (1998), "Marija Magdalena" by Doris Dragović fourth (1999), "Kad zaspu anđeli" by Goran Karan ninth (2000), and "Strings of My Heart" by Vanna tenth (2001). A period of 23 years without a top ten result followed, which was interrupted by a second-place finish in 2024 with "Rim Tim Tagi Dim" by Baby Lasagna.

Croatia failed to reach the final for four years in succession (2010–2013), before choosing to not participate in 2014 and 2015. Croatia returned and reached the final in both 2016 and 2017, before again failing to reach the final for four consecutive contests (2018–2022), and in 2025. In total, Croatia has failed to reach the final in nine of the last fifteen contests it has entered.

== Participation ==
Hrvatska radiotelevizija (HRT) has been a full member of the European Broadcasting Union (EBU) since 1st January 1993, thus eligible to participate in the Eurovision Song Contest since then. It has participated in the contest representing Croatia since its 38th edition that same year.

Before its independence in 1991, Croatia was part of Yugoslavia. Ten Yugoslavian entrants in the Eurovision Song Contest came from the former SR Croatia (1963, 1968, 1969, 1971, 1972, 1986, 1987, 1988, 1989, and 1990). Apart from being the most successful Yugoslav republic in the contest, it gave the socialist republic its only win, "Rock Me", performed by Riva in 1989 in Lausanne. The 1990 contest was held in Zagreb as a result, hosted by HRT's predecessor Radio Televizija Zagreb on behalf of the Yugoslav Radio Television (JRT).

== History ==
=== 1990s ===
Following the dissolution of Yugoslavia in 1991, Croatia became an independent country, and Croatian Radiotelevision (HRT) became an EBU member in 1993.

In February 1993, HRT organised HTF - Hrvatski televizijski festival (Croatian television festival), which was to select the country's debut entry as an independent state for the 1993 contest. The band Put won performing the song "Don't Ever Cry" which was, despite the English title, also partially performed in Croatian. The song came third in the Kvalifikacija za Millstreet pre-selection event, which allowed their participation in the 1993 contest. HTF was also held in 1994 for the 1994 contest, until being renamed to Dora in 1995, the name which is still to this day used for the Croatian pre-selection event. The new name for the contest was inspired by the Croatian composer Dora Pejačević.

Along with Cyprus, Malta, Norway, Portugal, and Sweden, Croatia was never relegated in the 1990s, and, unlike Cyprus, Norway, and Portugal, it was never relegated in the beginning of the 21st century. Relegation meant that the country would have to sit out the subsequent contest due to poor placement.

=== 2000s ===
Croatia continued selecting its participants through Dora for the entirety of the decade. After Vanna's song "Strings of my Heart" finished 10th at the 2001 contest, the country has not achieved a Top 10 placement until placing second at the 2024 contest. The 2007 edition of the contest saw Croatia failing to qualify for the finals for the first time ever. The country qualified for the finals again at the 2008 and 2009 contests, achieving their lowest placements at the time, placing 21st and 18th respectively.

=== 2010s ===
Both 2010 and 2011 Dora winners, Feminnem and Daria Kinzer respectively, failed to quality for the finals at the 2010 and 2011 contests. In 2012, Dora was cancelled, and for the first time ever since the country's debut in 1993, no pre-selection contest was held. An internal selection was made by HRT instead, with Nina Badrić and Klapa s Mora selected to represent Croatia at the 2012 and 2013 contests respectively. Both entries ultimately continued Croatia's non-qualification streak.

HRT announced on 19 September 2013 that they would not participate in the 2014 contest, citing the financial difficulties, as well as a string of poor results between 2010 and 2013 influencing their decision to take a year's break. The last time Croatia qualified for the grand final at the time was in 2009. Croatia would not return to the contest in 2015, and on 5 May 2015, HRT announced that it wouldn't broadcast the 2015 contest either. It was the first time since 1992 for HRT to not broadcast the contest.

On 26 November 2015, it was announced that Croatia would return to the contest in 2016. It was also reported that the entry would possibly be the winner of the first season of The Voice – Najljepši glas Hrvatske. Nina Kraljić won The Voice and was selected to represent Croatia with the internally selected song "Lighthouse". The entry qualified for the final, making it the first time Croatia had made it to the final since 2009. After the successful return in 2016, Croatian national broadcaster HRT confirmed on 17 September 2016 that they would also participate in 2017. Jacques Houdek, the coach of Nina Kraljić in The Voice, was internally selected to represent the country on 17 February 2017, exactly five months after they confirmed the participation. Franka Batelić was internally selected to represent the country at the 2018 contest.

On 30 October 2018, it was announced by HRT that the national final, Dora, would return in 2019, traditionally taking place in Opatija, a famous summer resort. Roko won the first renewed edition of Dora with "The Dream", ultimately failing to qualify for the finals at the 2019 contest.

=== 2020s ===
In March 2021, it was confirmed that HRT and Opatija had signed a three-year long contract regarding the organization of HRT Music Days and Dora, meaning both of these events were held in the city annually until 2024. Damir Kedžo won the 2020 edition of Dora with "Divlji vjetre", but did not represent Croatia due to the 2020 contest's cancellation caused by the COVID-19 pandemic. Albina and Mia Dimšić won the subsequent Dora editions, both failing to qualify for the finals at the 2021 and 2022 contests. Let 3 won Dora in 2023 and went on to secure the country's first finale qualification since 2017, ultimately finishing 13th.

The following year's 2024 edition of Dora was held in Zagreb through two semi-final shows on 22 and 23 February, and the final show on 25 February 2024. Baby Lasagna won with "Rim Tim Tagi Dim" and achieved the country's best result to date, having placed second at the 2024 contest. Marko Bošnjak won Dora 2025 and represented Croatia at the Eurovision Song Contest 2025; however, the country did not qualify for the Grand Final.

The final of Dora 2026, the selection contest for the 2026 edition, was held on 15 February 2026 and was won by Lelek with the song "Andromeda". The entry qualified for the final, placing fifteenth overall. Ahead of the 2026 contest, HRT aired Eurosong 70: Naši ljudi, naše pjesme, a two-part documentary series produced in honor of the contest's 70th edition; it looked back at Croatia's history at the contest.

== Participation overview ==
Prior to Yugoslavia's dissolution, artists from the Croatian federal unit represented Yugoslavia in 1963, 1968, 1969, 1971, 1972, 1986, 1987, 1988, 1989, and 1990.

Table key
1	First place
2	Second place
3	Third place
◇	Entry selected but did not compete

Year	Artist	Song	Language	Final	Points	Semi	Points
1993	Put	"Don't Ever Cry"	Croatian,English	15	31	3 (Note: Progressed through Kvalifikacija za Millstreet)	51
1994	Tony Cetinski	"Nek' ti bude ljubav sva"	Croatian	16	27	No semi-finals	
1995	Magazin and Lidija	"Nostalgija"	Croatian	6	91	No semi-finals	
1996	Maja Blagdan	"Sveta ljubav"	Croatian	4	98	19	30
1997	E.N.I.	"Probudi me"	Croatian	17	24	No semi-finals	
1998	Danijela	"Neka mi ne svane"	Croatian	5	131	No semi-finals	
1999	Doris	"Marija Magdalena"	Croatian	4	118	No semi-finals	
2000	Goran Karan	"Kad zaspu anđeli"	Croatian	9	70	No semi-finals	
2001	Vanna	"Strings of My Heart"	English	10	42	No semi-finals	
2002	Vesna Pisarović	"Everything I Want"	English	11	44	No semi-finals	
2003	Claudia Beni	"Više nisam tvoja"	Croatian,English	15	29	No semi-finals	
2004	Ivan Mikulić	"You Are the Only One"	English	12	50	9	72
2005	Boris Novković feat. Lado members	"Vukovi umiru sami"	Croatian	11	115	4	169
2006	Severina	"Moja štikla"	Croatian	12	56	Top 11 in 2005 final (Note: According to the then-Eurovision rules, the top ten non-Big Four countries from the previous year along with the Big Four automatically qualified for the grand final without having to compete in semi-finals. Although Serbia and Montenegro finished in the top ten in 2005, they did not participate in the 2006 contest, and their place in the final was awarded to 11th-place Croatia.)	
2007	Dragonfly feat. Dado Topić	"Vjerujem u ljubav"	Croatian,English	Failed to qualify		16	54
2008	Kraljevi ulice and 75 Cents	"Romanca"	Croatian	21	44	4	112
2009	Igor Cukrov feat. Andrea	"Lijepa Tena"	Croatian	18	45	13 (Note: Qualified through the back-up jury selection)	33
2010	Feminnem	"Lako je sve"	Croatian	Failed to qualify		13	33
2011	Daria	"Celebrate"	English	Failed to qualify		15	41
2012	Nina Badrić	"Nebo"	Croatian	Failed to qualify		12	42
2013	Klapa s Mora	"Mižerja"	Croatian	Failed to qualify		13	38
2016	Nina Kraljić	"Lighthouse"	English	23	73	10	133
2017	Jacques Houdek	"My Friend"	English, Italian	13	128	8	141
2018	Franka	"Crazy"	English	Failed to qualify		17	63
2019	Roko	"The Dream"	English,Croatian	Failed to qualify		14	64
2020	Damir Kedžo ◇	"Divlji vjetre" ◇	Croatian ◇	Contest cancelled (Note: The 2020 contest was cancelled due to the COVID-19 pandemic.)			
2021	Albina	"Tick-Tock"	English,Croatian	Failed to qualify		11	110
2022	Mia Dimšić	"Guilty Pleasure"	English,Croatian	Failed to qualify		11	75
2023	Let 3	"Mama ŠČ!"	Croatian	13	123	8	76
2024	Baby Lasagna	"Rim Tim Tagi Dim"	English	2	547	1	177
2025	Marko Bošnjak	"Poison Cake"	English	Failed to qualify		12	28
2026	Lelek	"Andromeda"	Croatian	15	124	6	175
2027	Confirmed intention to participate †						

== Awards ==
=== Marcel Bezençon Awards ===
Year	Category	Song	Performer	Composer(s) lyrics (l) / music (m)	Final result	Points	Host city	Ref.
2024	Press Award	"Rim Tim Tagi Dim"	Baby Lasagna	Marko Purišić	2	547	(Sweden) Malmö	

=== Winners by OGAE members ===
Year	Song	Performer	OGAE Result	Points	Final Result	Points	Host city	Ref.
2024	"Rim Tim Tagi Dim"	Baby Lasagna	1	356	2	547	(Sweden) Malmö	

=== Barbara Dex Award ===
Year	Performer	Host city	Ref.
2016	Nina Kraljić	(Sweden) Stockholm	

=== You're a Vision Award ===
Year	Performer	Host city	Ref.
2024	Baby Lasagna	(Sweden) Malmö	

== Related involvement ==
=== Conductors ===
Year	Conductor (Note: All conductors are of Croatian nationality unless otherwise noted.)	Notes	Ref.
1993	Andrej Baša	(Note: Also conducted in the prequalifying round)	
1994	Miljenko Prohaska		
1995	Stipica Kalogjera		
1996	Alan Bjelinski		
1997	No conductor		
1998	Stipica Kalogjera		
1999	No orchestra	(Note: Conducted by Stipica Kalogjera at the national final.)	
2000	No orchestra		
2001	No orchestra	(Note: Conducted by Stipica Kalogjera at the national final.)	
2002	No orchestra	(Note: Conducted by Stipica Kalogjera at the national final.)	
2003	No orchestra	(Note: Conducted by Silvije Glojnarić at the national final.)	

=== Heads of delegation ===
Each participating broadcaster in the Eurovision Song Contest assigns a head of delegation as the EBU's contact person and the leader of their delegation at the event. The delegation, whose size can greatly vary, includes a head of press, the contestants, songwriters, composers and backing vocalists, among others.

Year	Head of delegation	Ref.
1993–2000	Ksenija Urličić	
2001–2013	Aleksandar "Aco" Kostadinov	
2016	Željko Mesar	
2017–2018	Tomislav Štengl	
2019	Elizabeth Homsi	
2020–2021	Uršula Tolj	
2022–	Tomislav Štengl	

=== Jury members ===
Each participating broadcaster assembles a five-member jury panel consisting of music industry professionals for the Eurovision Song Contest, ranking all entries except for their own. The modern incarnation of jury voting was introduced beginning with the 2009 contest, and as of 2023, the juries' votes constitute just under 50% of the overall result in the final alongside televoting.

Jury members
Year	Juror A	Juror B	Juror C	Juror D	Juror E	Ref.
2016	Boris Đurđević	Damir Kedžo	Duško Mandić	Kim Verson	Pamela Ramljak	
2017	Dino Jelusić	Ivana Kindl	Sanja Doležaj	Saša Lozar	Tihomir Preradović	
2018	Gina Victoria Damjanović	Kornelije Hećimović	Miroslav Lesić	Mustafa Softić	Zdenka Kovačiček	
2019	Bojan Jambrošić	Doris Karamatić	Franka Batelić	Silvije Glojnarić	Zlatko Turkalj	
2021	Denis Dumančić	Luka Nižetić	Monika Lelas Halambek	Nika Turković	Antonia Matković-Šerić	
2022	Dinko Komadina	Mia Negovetić	Antonela Đinđić	Predrag Martinjak	Saša Lozar	
2023	Albina Grčić	Branimir Mihaljević	Damir Kedžo	Jelena Balent	Nikša Bratoš	
2024	Dino Jelusić	Gina Victoria Damjanović	Mihovil Šoštarić	Srđan Sekulović Skansi	Ivana Ranilović-Vrdoljak	
2025	Antonela Doko	Mia Negovetić	Miroslav Lesić	Monika Lelas Halambek	Tihomir Preradović	

=== Commentators and spokespersons ===
For the show's broadcast on HRT, various commentators have provided commentary on the contest in the Croatian language. At the Eurovision Song Contest after all points are calculated, the presenters of the show call upon each voting country to invite each respective spokesperson to announce the results of their vote on-screen.

From 1961 until 1991, Croatia was part of Yugoslavia and TV Zagreb, the affiliate of JRT in the socialist republic, broadcast the contest with Croatian commentary.

Year	Television		Radio		Spokesperson	Ref.
Year	Channel	Commentator(s)	Channel	Commentator(s)	Spokesperson	Ref.
1993	HTV 1	Aleksandar Kostadinov	No broadcast		Velimir Đuretić (Note: The spokesperson from the prequalifying round was Ksenija Urličić.)	
1994	HRT 1	Aleksandar Kostadinov	No broadcast		Helga Vlahović	
1995	HRT 1	Aleksandar Kostadinov	No broadcast		Daniela Trbović	
1996	HRT 1	Aleksandar Kostadinov	No broadcast		Daniela Trbović	
1997	HRT 1	Aleksandar Kostadinov	No broadcast		Davor Meštrović	
1998	HRT 1	Aleksandar Kostadinov	No broadcast		Davor Meštrović	
1999	HRT 1	Aleksandar Kostadinov	No broadcast		Marko Rašica	
2000	HRT 1	Unknown	No broadcast		Marko Rašica	
2001	HRT 1	Unknown	No broadcast		Daniela Trbović	
2002	HRT 1	Ante Batinović	No broadcast		Duško Čurlić	
2003	HRT 1	Daniela Trbović	Unknown		Davor Meštrović	
2004	HRT 2 (semi-final); HRT 1 (final)	Unknown	No broadcast		Barbara Kolar	
2005	HRT 2 (semi-final); HRT 1 (final)	Unknown	No broadcast		Barbara Kolar	
2006	HRT 2 (semi-final); HRT 1 (final)	Duško Čurlić	No broadcast		Mila Horvat	
2007	HRT 1 (all shows)	Duško Čurlić	No broadcast		Barbara Kolar	
2008	HRT 2 (semi-finals); HRT 1 (final)	Duško Čurlić	No broadcast		Barbara Kolar	
2009	HRT 2 (semi-finals); HRT 1 (final)	Duško Čurlić	No broadcast		Mila Horvat	
2010	HRT 2 (semi-finals); HRT 1 (final)	Duško Čurlić	No broadcast		Mila Horvat	
2011	HRT 1 (all shows)	Duško Čurlić	No broadcast		Nevena Rendeli	
2012	HRT 1 (all shows)	Duško Čurlić	No broadcast		Nevena Rendeli	
2013	HRT 2 (semi-finals); HRT 1 (final)	Duško Čurlić	HR 2 (final)	Robert Urlić	Uršula Tolj	
2014 (Note: In 2014, HRT screened only the grand final. The semi-finals were not screened.)	HRT 1 (final)	Aleksandar Kostadinov	HR 2 (final)	Aleksandar Kostadinov	Did not participate	
2015	No broadcast				Did not participate	
2016	HRT 1 (all shows)	Duško Čurlić	HR 2 (all shows)	Zlatko Turkalj	Nevena Rendeli	
2017	HRT 1 (all shows)	Duško Čurlić	HR 2 (all shows)	Zlatko Turkalj	Uršula Tolj	
2018	HRT 1 (all shows)	Duško Čurlić	HR 2 (all shows)	Duško Čurlić	Uršula Tolj	
2019	HRT 1 (all shows)	Duško Čurlić	HR 2 (all shows)	Duško Čurlić	Monika Lelas Halambek	
2020	Not announced before cancellation					N/A
2021	HRT 1 (all shows)	Duško Čurlić	HR 2 (all shows)	Unknown	Ivan Dorian Molnar	
2022	HRT 1 (all shows)	Duško Čurlić	HR 2 (all shows)	Zlatko Turkalj	Ivan Dorian Molnar	
2023	HRT 1 (all shows)	Duško Čurlić	HR 2 (all shows)	Unknown	Maja Ciglenečki	
2024	HRT 1 (all shows)	Duško Čurlić	HR 2 (all shows)	Zlatko Turkalj	Ivan Dorian Molnar	
2025	HRT 1 (all shows)	Duško Čurlić	HR 2 (all shows)	Zlatko Turkalj	Doris Pinčić	
2026	HRT 1 (all shows)	Duško Čurlić	HR 2 (all shows)	Zlatko Turkalj	Doris Pinčić	

== Photo gallery ==
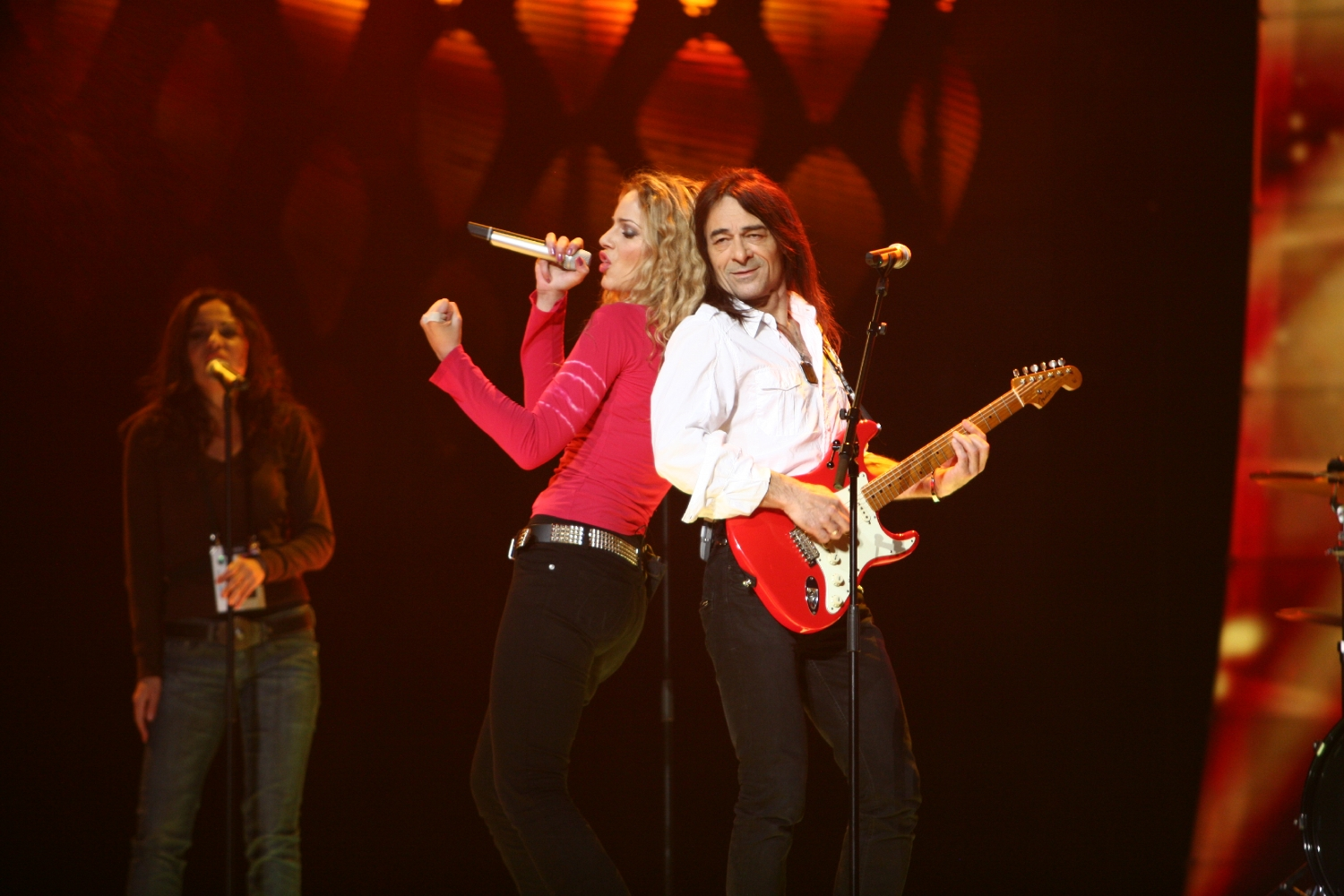
Dragonfly feat. Dado Topić in Helsinki (2007)

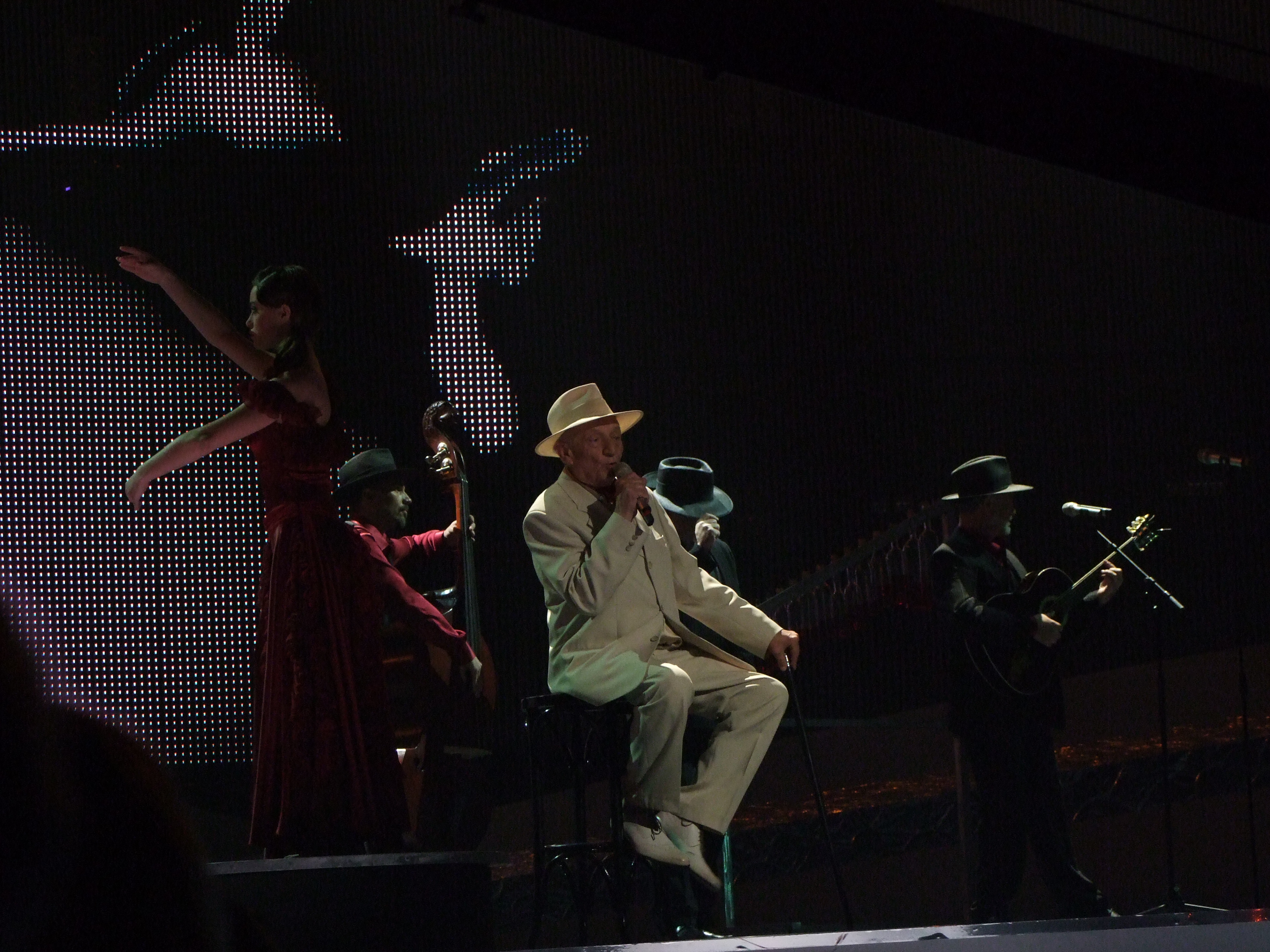
Kraljevi ulice & 75 Cents in Belgrade (2008)

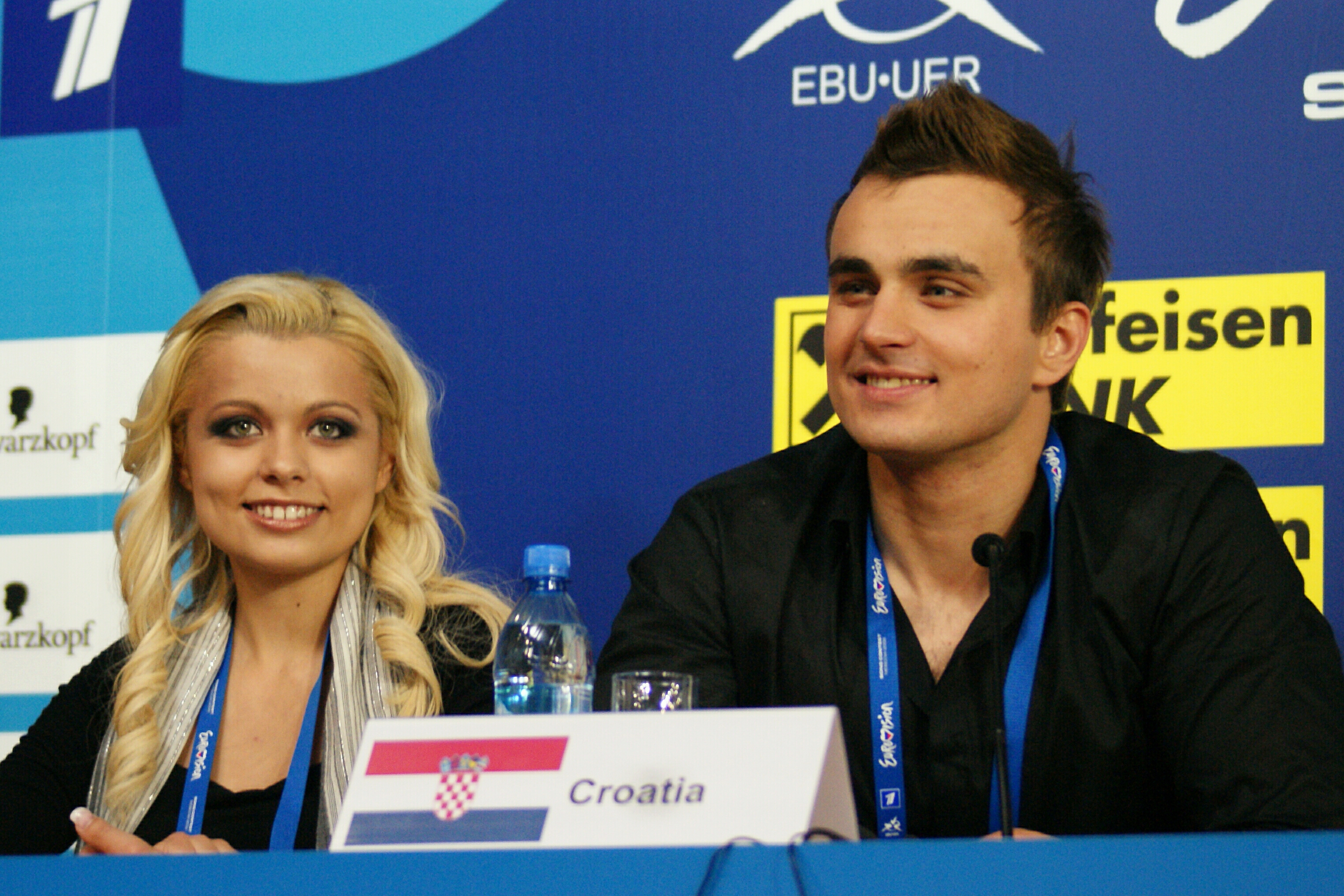
Igor Cukrov feat. Andrea in Moscow (2009)

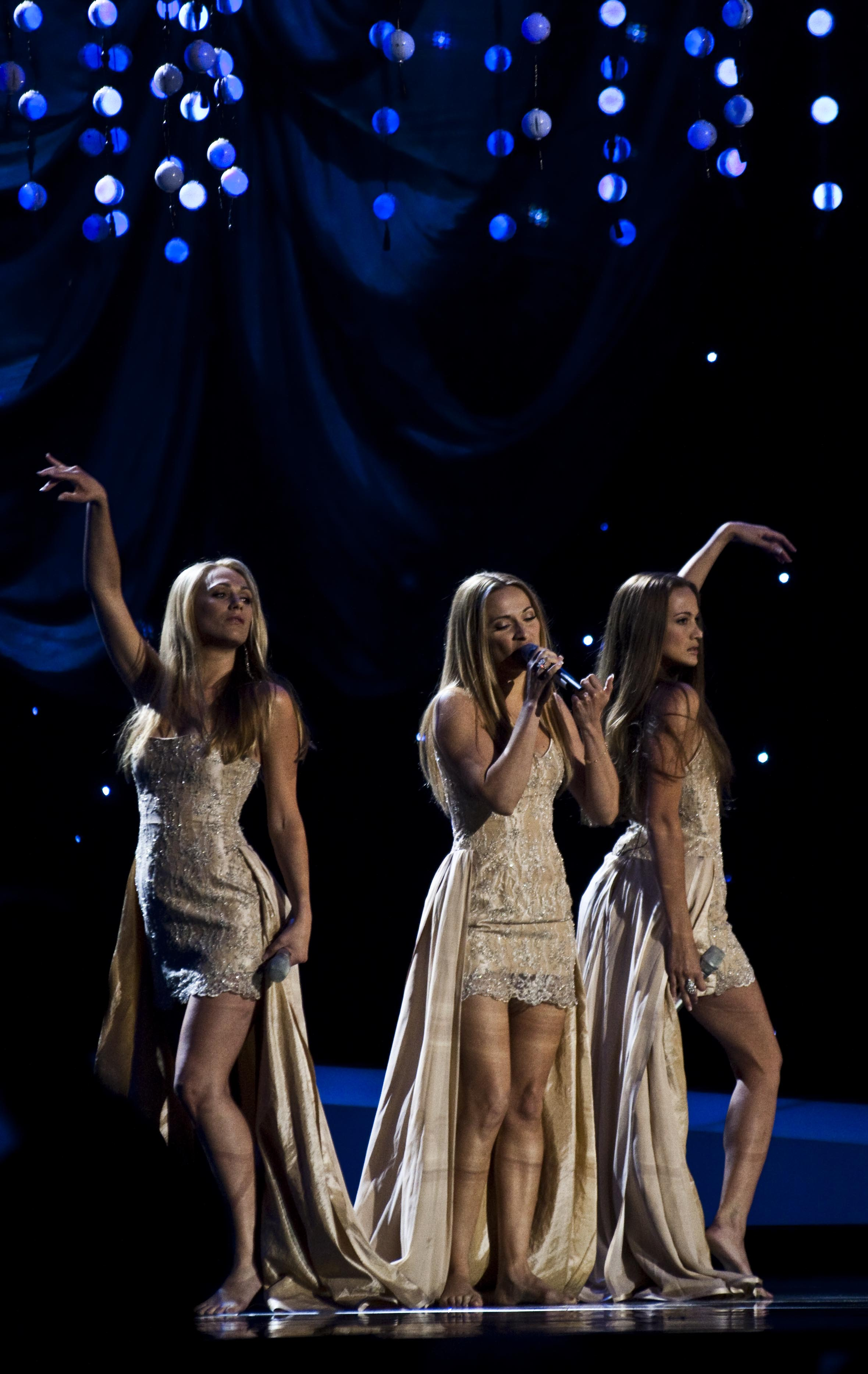
Feminnem in Oslo (2010)

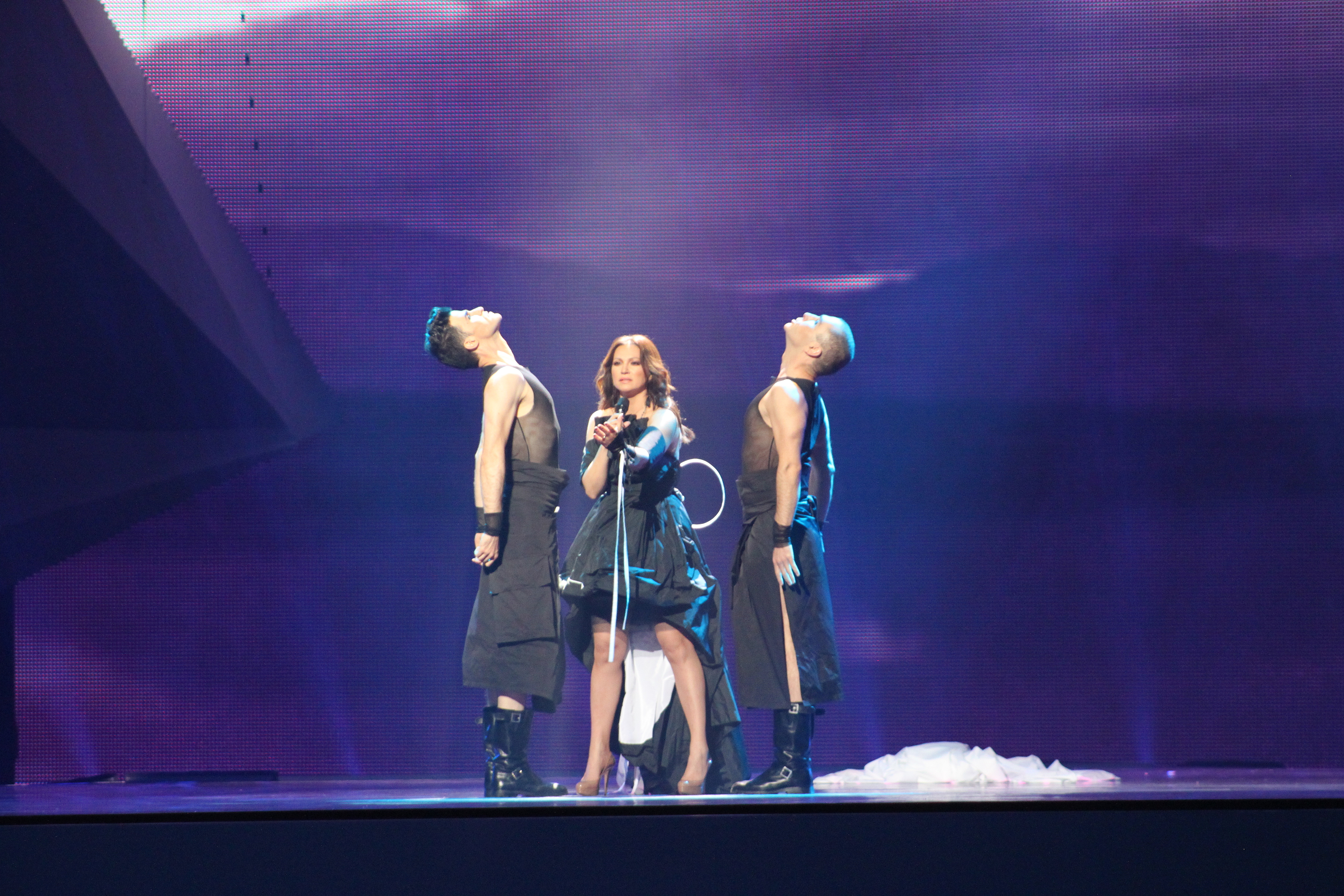
Nina Badrić in Baku (2012)

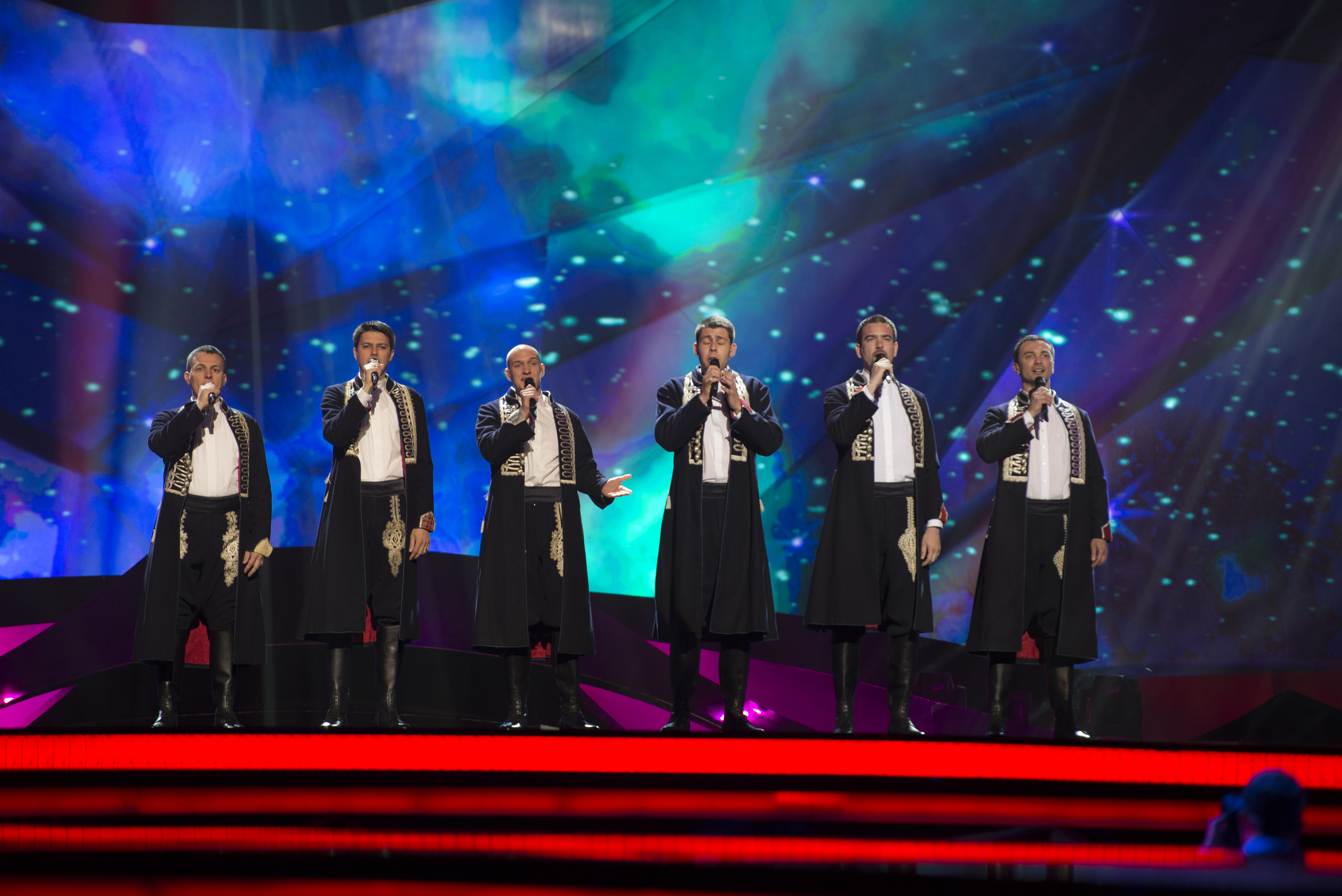
Klapa s Mora in Malmö (2013)

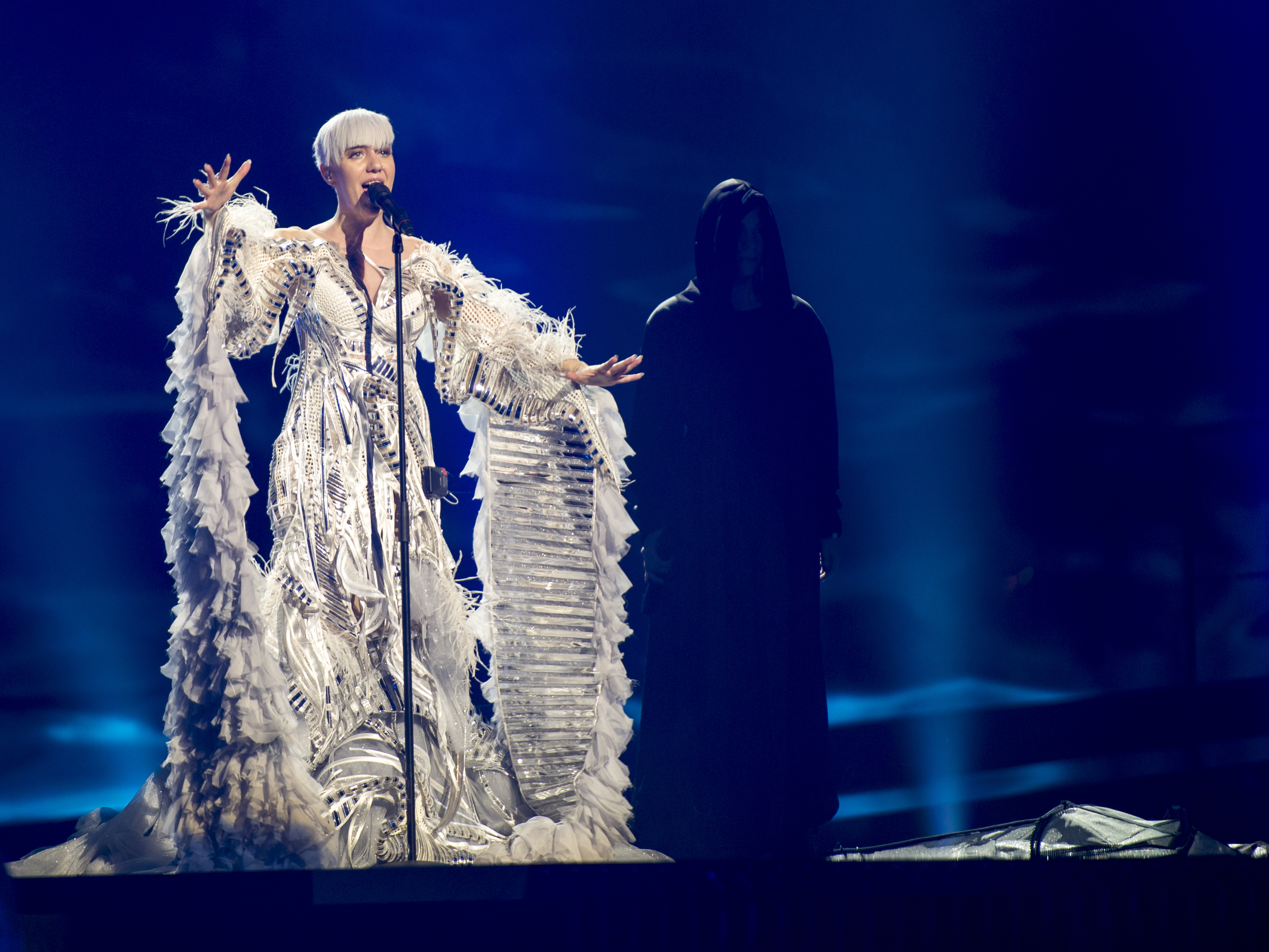
Nina Kraljić in Stockholm (2016)

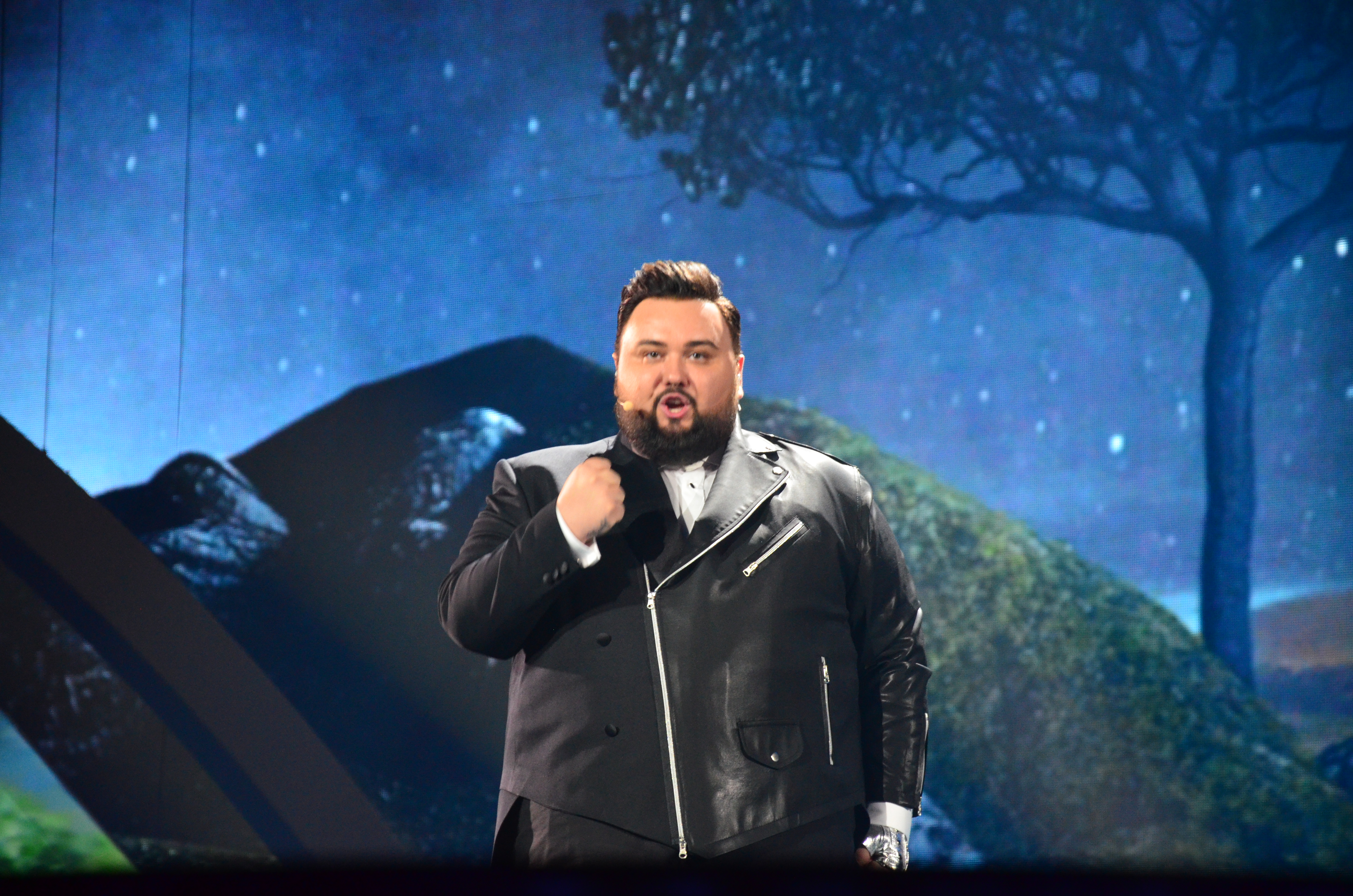
Jacques Houdek in Kyiv (2017)

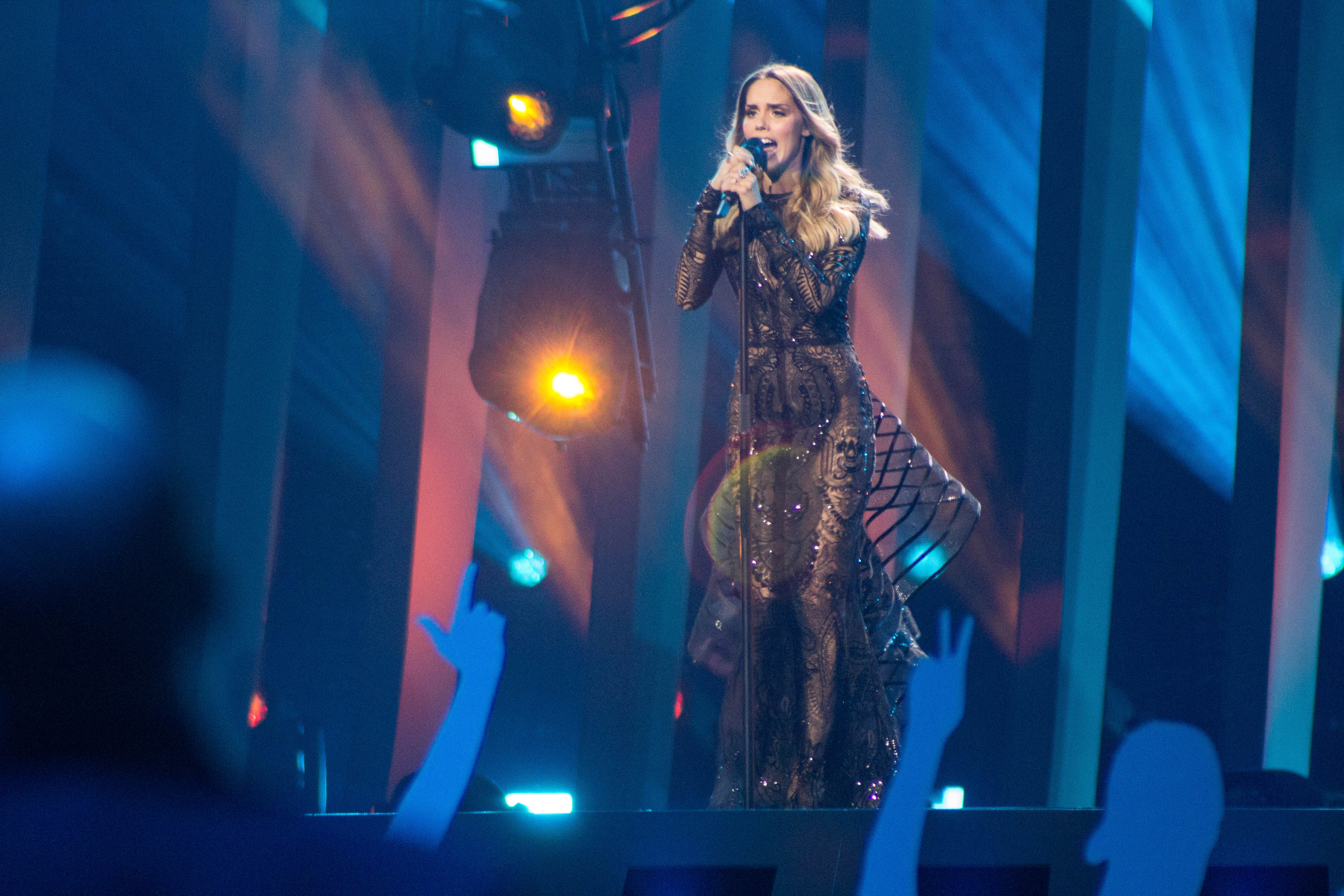
Franka in Lisbon (2018)

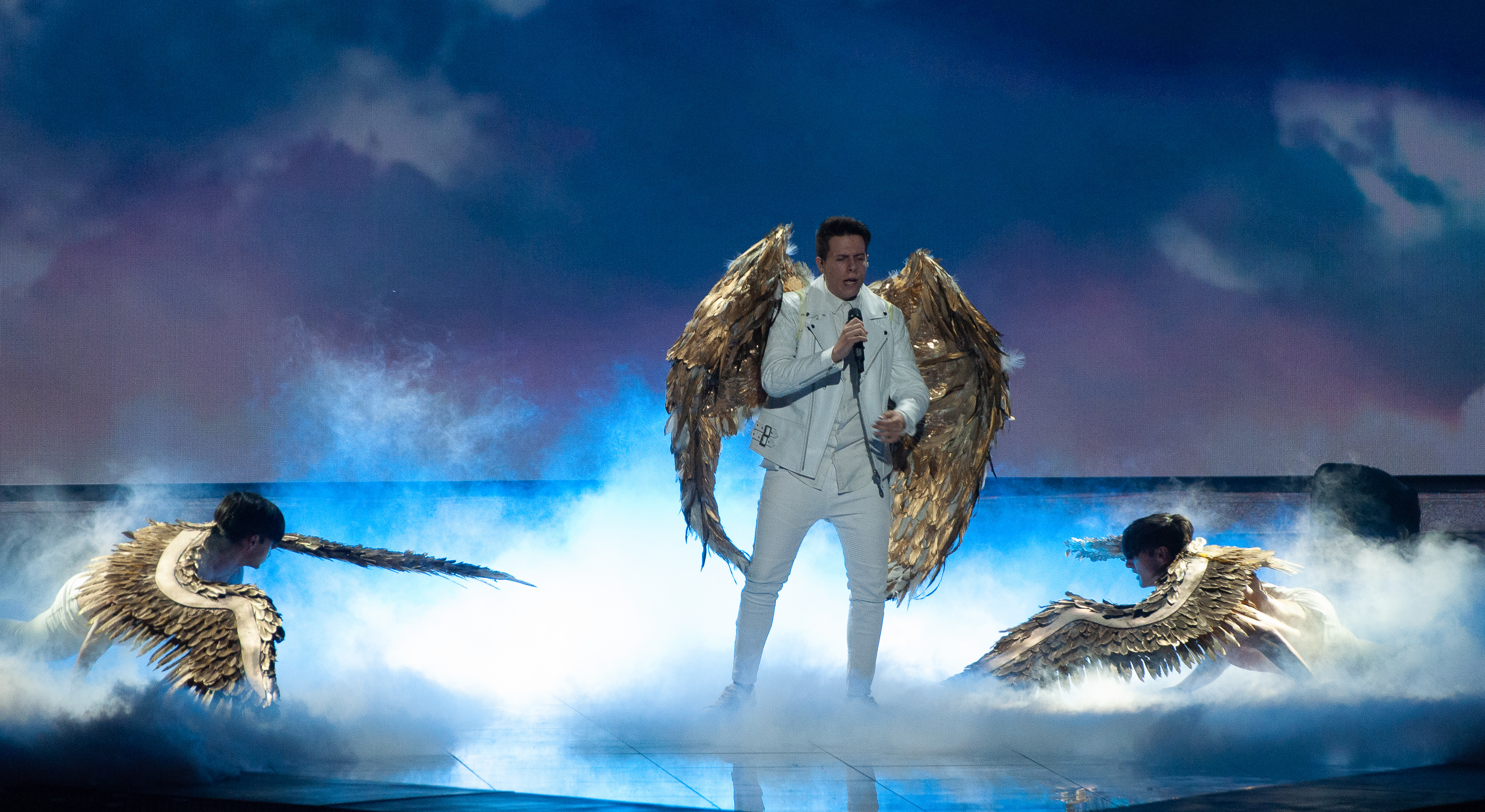
Roko in Tel Aviv (2019)

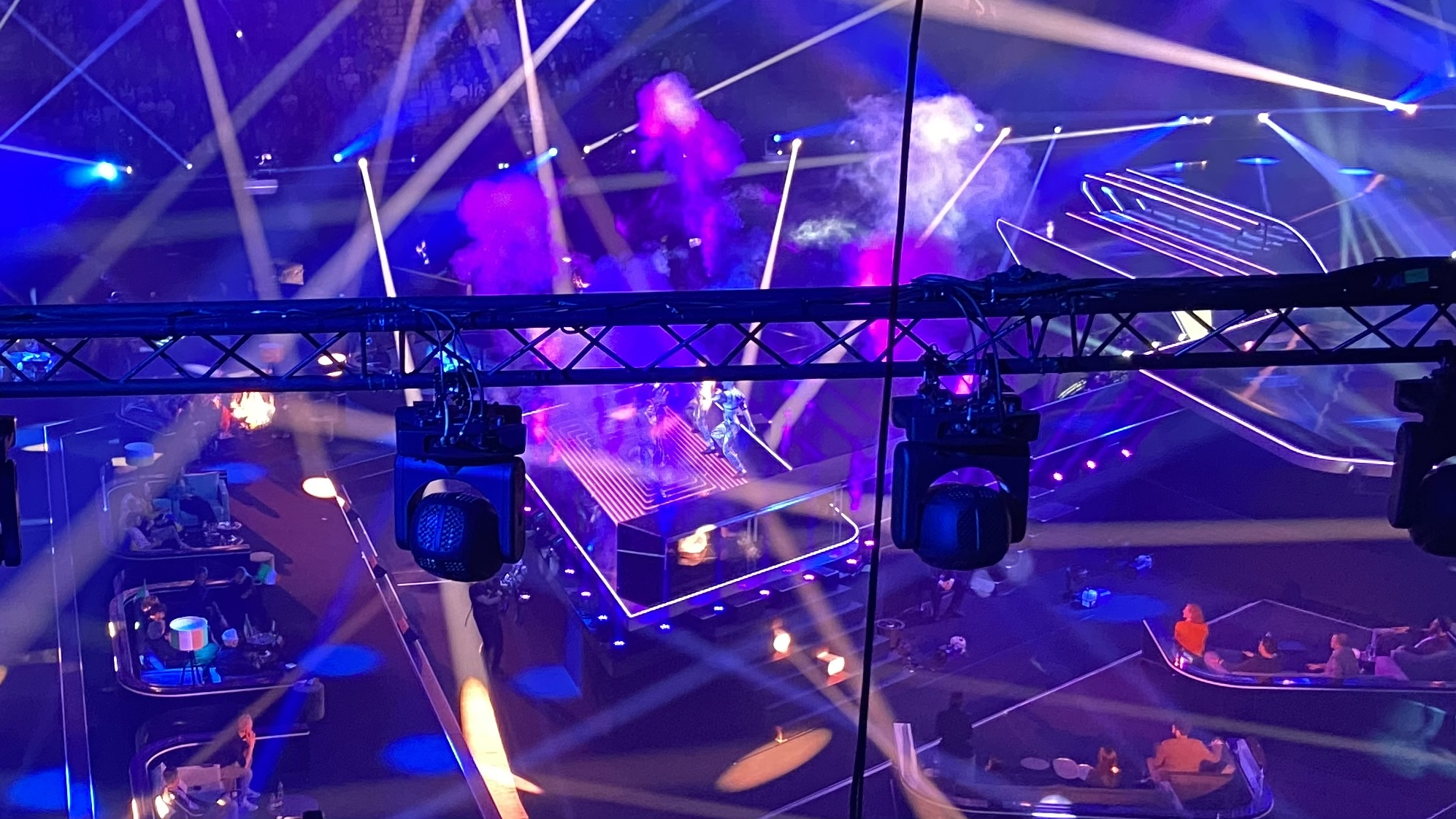
Albina in Rotterdam (2021)

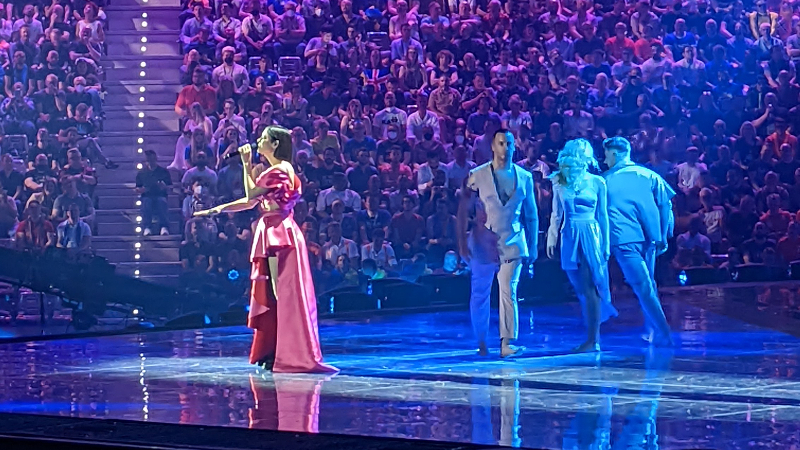
Mia Dimšić in Turin (2022)

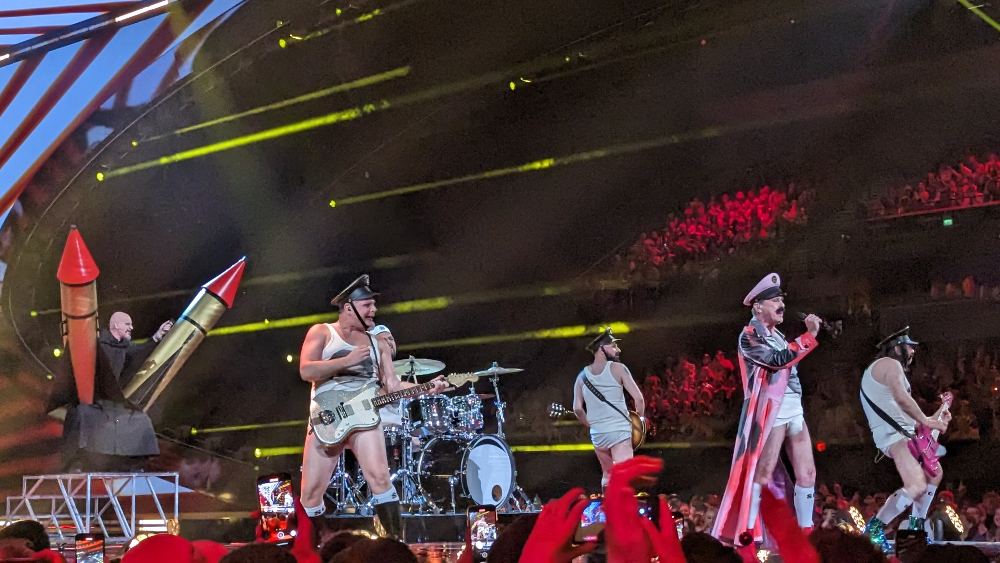
Let 3 in Liverpool (2023)

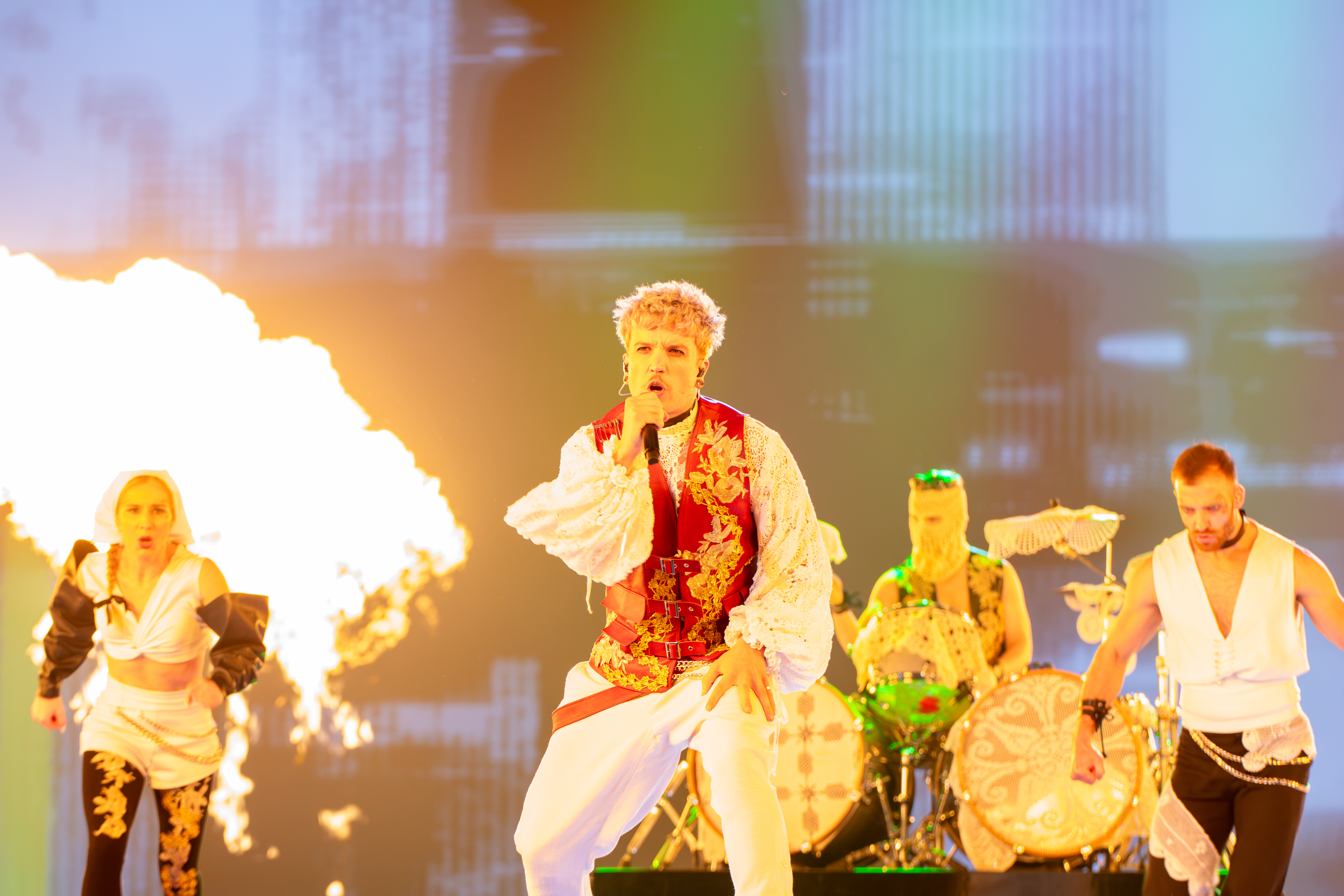
Baby Lasagna in Malmö (2024)

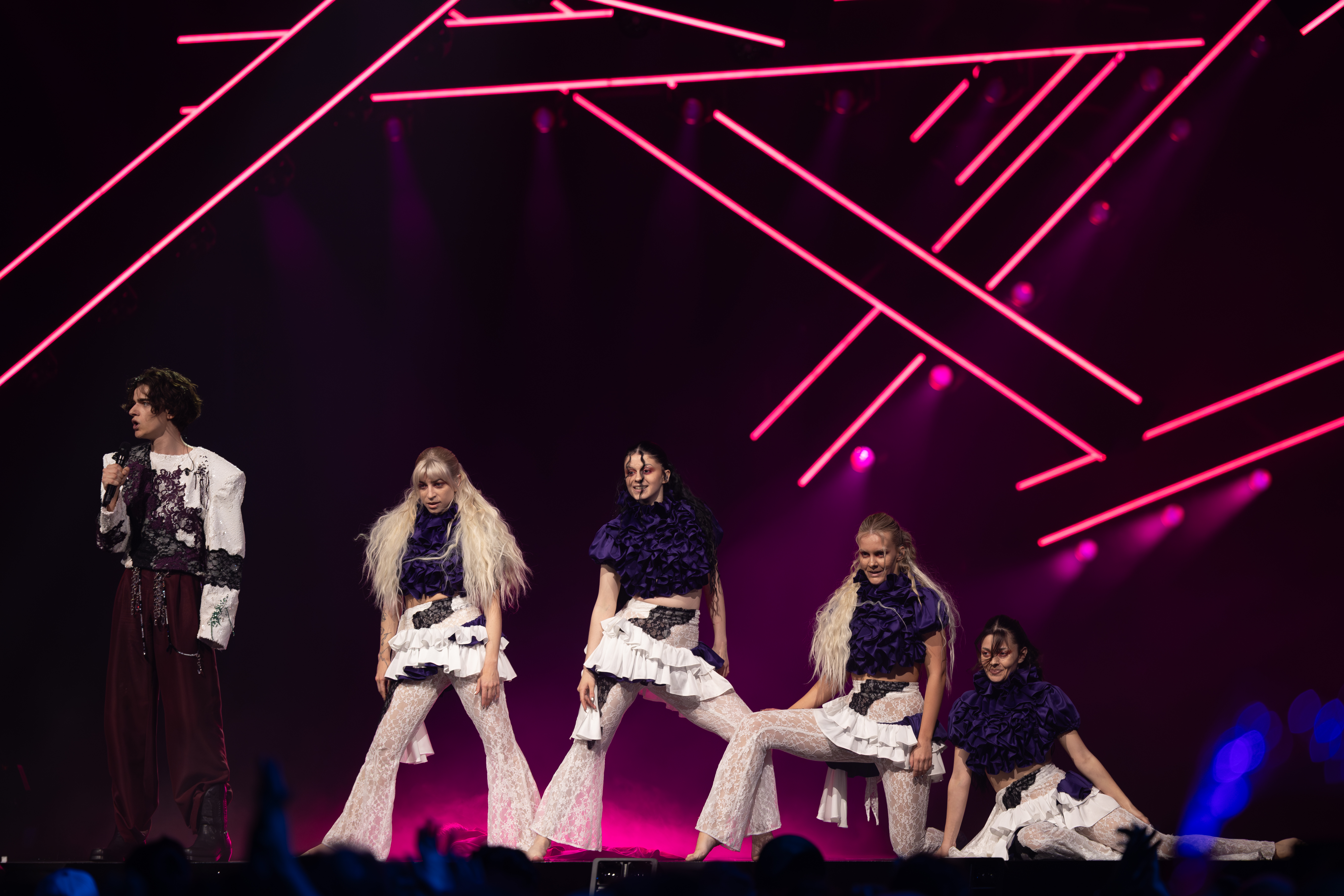
Marko Bošnjak in Basel (2025)

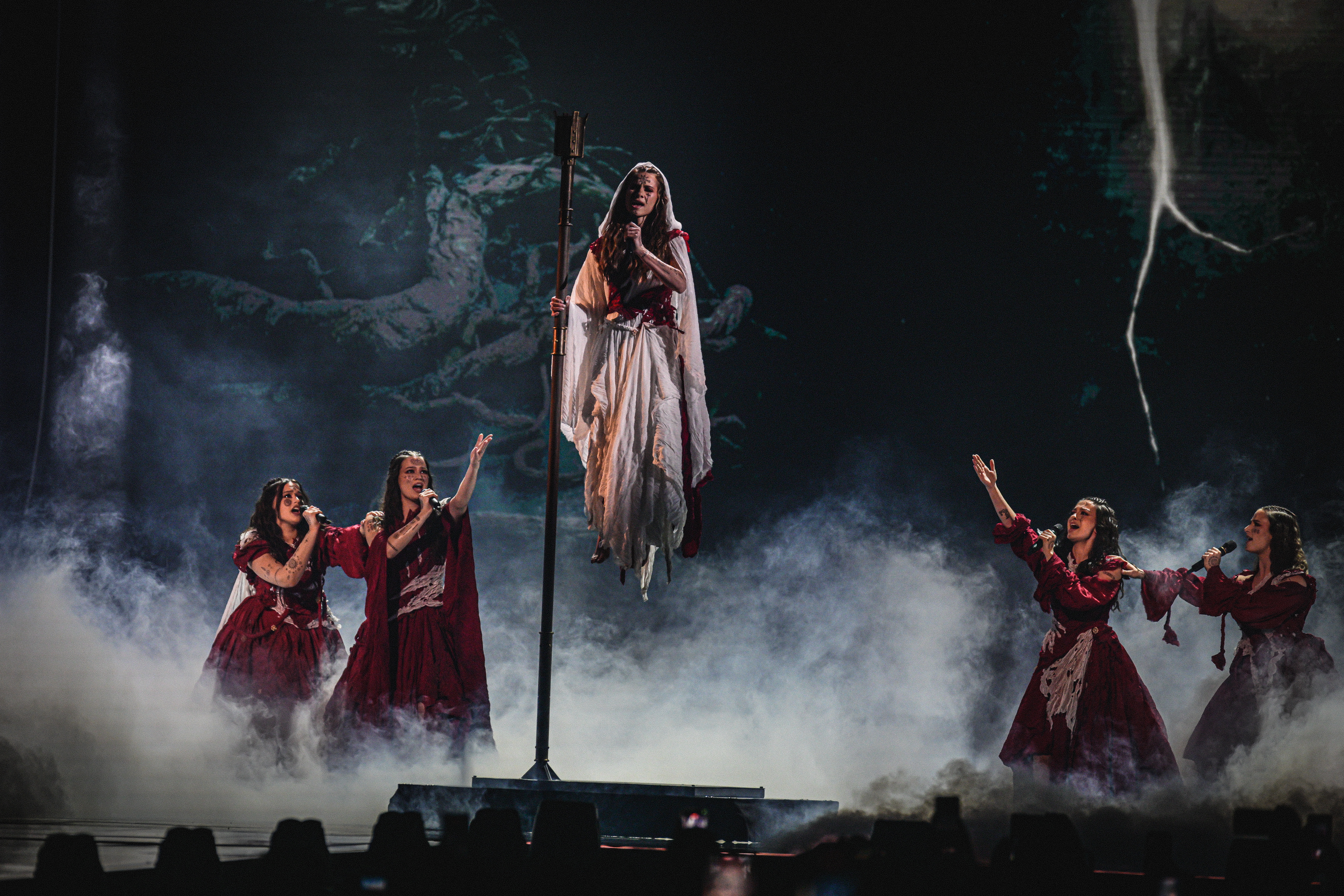
Lelek in Vienna (2026)

== See also ==
- Croatia in the Junior Eurovision Song Contest
- Croatia in the Eurovision Young Musicians
- Eurosong 70: Naši ljudi, naše pjesme
