= The Voice Hrvatska season 3 =

The Voice Hrvatska
- Season 3
- Hosted by: Iva Šulentić; Ivan Vukušić
- Coaches: Davor Gobac; Massimo Savić; Vanna; Ivan Dečak
- Winner: Vinko Ćemeraš
- Winning coach: Davor Gobac
- Runner-up: Filip Rudan

Release
- Original network: HRT
- Original release: 7 December 2019 – 22 February 2020

Season chronology
- Next → Season 4

The third season of the Croatian reality television show The Voice Hrvatska premiered on 7 December 2019, on HRT. Ivan Dečak returned as coach for his third season. New coaches Davor Gobac, Massimo Savić and Vanna joined the coaching panel, replacing Tony Cetinski, Jacques Houdek and Indira Levak, respectively.

== Teams ==
Color key

- Winner
- Runner-up
- Third place
- Fourth place
- Eliminated in the Semi-finals
- Eliminated in the Playoffs
- Saved by another coach in battle rounds
- Eliminated in Battle Rounds
- Eliminated in Knockouts Rounds

Coach	Top 40					
Davor Gobac						
Davor Gobac	Vinko Ćemeraš	Dora Juričić	Josip Palameta	Tea Lovreković	Aleksandar Baić	Maroje Strgačić
Davor Gobac	Petra Perišić	Iva Islambegović	Domagoj Olujić	Andrea Sentić	Eni Pupić Marijan	
Massimo Savić						
Massimo Savić	Albina Grčić	Adriana Vidović	Maria Florencia Celani	Petra Roško	~~Josip Palameta~~	~~Vjekoslav Banovčić~~
Massimo Savić	Bruna Levar	Ivo Kralj	Stela Šmit	Roko Bunčić	Erik Vidović	
Vanna						
Vanna	Filip Rudan	Darija Ramljak	Goran Orešković	Mija Mihanović	~~Albina Grčić~~	Kristian Marolt
Vanna	Ivan Sever	Mia Reba	Tin Šarić	Gianluca Draguzet	Angelica Zacchingna	
Ivan Dečak						
Ivan Dečak	Bernarda Bobovečki	Jakob Grubišak	Karlo Vudrić	Vjekoslav Banovčić	~~Goran Orešković~~	Karla Ana Sabljak
Ivan Dečak	Ružica Čović	Ines Nožica	Karla Ban	Denis Knežević	Leon Gospodarić	
Note: Italicized names denote "stolen" contestants within their new teams (names struck through on their original teams).

== Blind auditions ==
The Block button, which appeared in the US version of the franchise, was applied this season. Each coach had one block to prevent another coach from getting an artist.

Color key

✔	Coach pressed "I WANT YOU" button
	Artist defaulted to a coach's team
	Artist elected a coach's team
	Artist was eliminated with no coach pressing their button
✘	Coach pressed the "I WANT YOU" button, but was blocked by Davor from getting the artist
✘	Coach pressed the "I WANT YOU" button, but was blocked by Massimo from getting the artist
✘	Coach pressed the "I WANT YOU" button, but was blocked by Vanna from getting the artist
✘	Coach pressed the "I WANT YOU" button, but was blocked by Ivan from getting the artist

=== Episode 1 (7 December) ===
Order	Artist	Age	Hometown	Song	Coach's and artist's choices			
Order	Artist	Age	Hometown	Song	Davor	Massimo	Vanna	Ivan
1	Aleksandar Baić	33	Karlovac	"I Need a Dollar"	✔	✔	✔	✔
2	Albina Grčić	20	Split	"En cambio no"	✔	—	✔	—
3	Sandro Gerbec	21	Split	"Mjesto za mene"	—	—	—	—
4	Vjekoslav Banovčić	21	Nova Gradiška	"New Shoes"	—	✔	✔	—
5	Andrea Aužina	21	Split	"Moja posljednja i prva ljubavi"	—	—	—	—
6	Petra Perišić	25	Podstrana	"Son of a Preacher Man"	✔	✔	—	✔
7	Gianluca Draguzet	23	Barban	"Dužna si"	—	—	✔	—
8	Dora Juričić	23	Zaprešić	"I'm Outta Love"	✔	—	—	✔
9	Jakob Grubišak	18	Zagreb	"River"	✔	✘	✔	✔
10	Ivana Mikulčić	19	Zagreb	"Fever"	—	—	—	—
11	Ružica Čović		Tučepi	"Zombie"	—	✔	—	✔

=== Episode 2 (14 December) ===
Order	Artist	Age	Hometown	Song	Coach's and artist's choices			
Order	Artist	Age	Hometown	Song	Davor	Massimo	Vanna	Ivan
1	Iva Islambegović	26	Umag	"Krivi ljudi"	✔	—	✘	—
2	Donat Mandić	24	Zadar	"How Would You Feel (Paean)"	—	—	—	—
3	Mija Mihanović	19	Podstrana	"Rise Up"	—	—	✔	—
4	Goran Orešković	21	Delnice	"Tennessee Whiskey"	—	—	✔	✔
5	Marko Omazić	21	Livno, Bosnia and Herzegovina	"Jednom kad noć"	—	—	—	—
6	Maria Florencia Celani	31	Zagreb	"Listen (Oye)"	—	✔	✘	✔
7	Erik Vidović	19	Koprivnica	"Take Me to Church"	—	✔	—	—
8	Nikolina Sirovina	21	Zagreb	"Rekao si"	—	—	—	—
9	Tea Lovreković	19	Varaždin	"Always Remember Us This Way"	✔	✔	✔	✔
10	Tin Šarić	28	Zagreb	"Superstition"	—	✔	✔	—
11	Bernarda Bobovečki	20	Slavonski Brod	"Hurt"	—	—	—	✔
12	Matej Hanžek & Ivan Hanžek	29	Rijeka	"Over the Hills and Far Away"	—	—	—	—

=== Episode 3 (21 December) ===
Order	Artist	Age	Hometown	Song	Coach's and artist's choices			
Order	Artist	Age	Hometown	Song	Davor	Massimo	Vanna	Ivan
1	Tomislav Marić	21	Žepče, Bosnia and Herzegovina	"Bridge Over Troubled Water"	—	—	—	—
2	Bruna Levar	29	Novi Vinodolski	"Piece of My Heart"	—	✔	—	—
3	Josip Palameta	22	Mostar, Bosnia and Herzegovina	"Cry Me A River"	✔	✔	✔	✔
4	Nina Herr		Zagreb	"Don't Cry For Me Loui"	—	—	—	—
5	Roko Bunčić	23	Karlovac	"You Raise Me Up"	—	✔	✔	—
6	Karlo Vudrić	26	Čiovo	"Dancing On My Own"	—	✔	✔	✔
7	Marko Kenji	32	Varaždin	"The House of the Rising Sun"	—	—	—	—
8	Mia Reba	20	Osijek	"I Put a Spell on You"	—	—	✔	✔
9	Isaura Nika Šeperović	19	Pula	"When We Were Young"	—	—	—	—
10	Maroje Strgačić	28	Zadar	"Now and Forever"	✔	—	—	—
11	Leon Gospodarić	19	Zagreb	"The Sound of Silence"	—	—	—	✔
12	Darija Ramljak	20	Međugorje, Bosnia and Herzegovina	"Ti me vodi preko voda"	—	✔	✔	✔

=== Episode 4 (28 December) ===
Order	Artist	Age	Hometown	Song	Coach's and artist's choices			
Order	Artist	Age	Hometown	Song	Davor	Massimo	Vanna	Ivan
1	Eni Pupić Marijan	22	Split	"Something's Got a Hold on Me"	✔	—	✔	—
2	Veselin Krstovski	33	Končanica	"The Greatest Show"	—	—	—	—
3	Adrijana Vidović	24	Split	"Creep"	✔	✔	✔	✔
4	Ivo Kralj	22	Solin	"Pelin i med"	—	✔	—	—
5	Angelica Zacchigna	25	Dajla	"What's Up?"	—	✔	✔	✔
6	Lidija Lapić	28	Slunj	"Zemlja i istina"	—	—	—	—
7	Andrea Sentić		Neum, Bosnia and Herzegovina	"The Show Must Go On"	✔	✔	✔	—
8	Kristijan Marolt	24	Donja Bistra	"Ako te pitaju"	—	—	✔	—
9	Ines Nožica	27	Pula	"Ain't No Mountain High Enough"	—	—	—	✔
10	Filip Rudan	20	Zagreb	"Someone You Loved"	—	✔	✔	✔
11	Arian Krašna	21	Umag	"Holding Back The Years"	—	—	—	—

=== Episode 5 (4 January) ===
Order	Artist	Age	Hometown	Song	Coach's and artist's choices			
Order	Artist	Age	Hometown	Song	Davor	Massimo	Vanna	Ivan
1	Vinko Ćemeraš	25	Čapljina, Bosnia and Herzegovina	"Pyro"	✔	✔	✔	✔
2	Karla Ban	22	Jastrebarsko	"Deeper"	—	—	✔	✔
3	Vjekoslav Vostrel	34	Zagreb	"Who Wants to Live Forever"	—	—	—	—
4	Petra Roško	25	Solin	"Who's Lovin' You"	—	✔	✔	—
5	Domagoj Olujić	28	Hlebine	"Too Much Love Will Kill You"	✔	—	—	—
6	Mateja Ištuk	21	Vukovar	"All I Want"	—	—	—	—
7	Stela Šmit	21	Kutina	"Seven Nation Army"	—	✔	✔	✘
8	Karla Ana Sabljak	19	Ogulin	"Zombie"	—	—	✔	✔
9	Ivan Sever	24	Zadar	"Scars"	—	—	✔	—
10	Petra Antulić	34	Zagreb	"Euphoria"	—	—	—	—
11	Anja Stanić	23	Rijeka	"I Wish"	—	—	—	—
12	Denis Knežević	23	Slatina	"Time Is Running Out"	—	—	—	✔

== The Knockouts ==
Color key:

Artist won the Knockout and advanced to The Battles round
Artist has been saved and might advance to The Battles round
Artist lost the Knockout and was eliminated

=== Knockouts 1 (11 January) ===
Order	Coach	Artist	Song	Result
1	Massimo	Erik Vidović	"I'm Not the Only One"	Eliminated
2	Massimo	Maria Florencia Celani	"Sreća je tamo gdje si ti"	Saved
3	Massimo	Vjekoslav Banovčić	"I Heard It Through the Grapevine"	Advanced
4	Davor	Eni Pupić Marijan	"Why'd You Only Call Me When You're High?"	Eliminated
5	Davor	Dora Juričić	"Waiting All Night"	Saved
6	Davor	Vinko Ćemeraš	"Run"	Advanced
7	Vanna	Albina Grčić	"A Million Dreams"	Saved
8	Vanna	Angelica Zacchingna	"One Night Only"	Eliminated
9	Vanna	Kristian Marolt	"Supergirl"	Advanced
10	Ivan	Jakob Grubišak	"Power Over Me"	Advanced
11	Ivan	Leon Gospodarić	"Hipnotiziran"	Eliminated
12	Ivan	Karlo Vudrić	"Bad"	Advanced

=== Knockouts 2 (18 January) ===
Order	Coach	Artist	Song	Result
1	Davor	Iva Islambegović	"The Power of Love"	Saved
2	Davor	Petra Perišić	"Me and Bobby McGee"	Advanced
3	Davor	Maroje Strgačić	"My Girl"	Advanced
4	Davor	Andrea Sentić	"Higher Love"	Eliminated
5	Vanna	Darija Ramljak	"Ako me nosiš na duši"	Advanced
6	Vanna	Gianluca Draguzet	"Gori more"	Eliminated
7	Vanna	Mija Mihanović	"Četiri stađuna"	Advanced
8	Vanna	Ivan Sever	"Sve ću preživit"	Advanced
9	Ivan	Ružica Čović	"Ain't Nobody"	Advanced
10	Ivan	Goran Orešković	"Wicked Game"	Advanced
11	Ivan	Denis Knežević	"Better Man"	Eliminated
12	Ivan	Ines Nožica	"Baby I Love You"	Saved
13	Massimo	Roko Bunčić	"Isn't She Lovely"	Eliminated
14	Massimo	Petra Roško	"Highway to Hell"	Advanced
15	Massimo	Ivo Kralj	"Žeđam"	Saved
16	Massimo	Josip Palameta	"The Way You Look Tonight"	Advanced

=== Knockouts 3 (25 January) ===
Order	Coach	Artist	Song	Result
1	Vanna	Filip Rudan	"Drag Me Down"	Advanced
2	Vanna	Tin Šarić	"Sex on Fire"	Eliminated
3	Vanna	Mia Reba	"Bésame Mucho"	Saved
4	Ivan	Karla Ban	"This World"	Eliminated
5	Ivan	Karla Ana Sabljak	"Run"	Advanced
6	Ivan	Bernarda Bobovečki	"Where Did You Sleep Last Night"	Saved
7	Massimo	Bruna Levar	"How Come You Don't Call Me"	Advanced
8	Massimo	Stela Šmit	"Never Forget You"	Eliminated
9	Massimo	Adriana Vidović	"Believer"	Advanced
10	Davor	Domagoj Olujić	"Mama Told Me Not to Come"	Eliminated
11	Davor	Tea Lovreković	"You Oughta Know"	Advanced
12	Davor	Aleksandar Baić	"(Sittin' On) The Dock of the Bay"	Advanced

==== Additional Battle Round ====
Order	Coach	Artist	Song	Result
1	Massimo	Maria Florencia Celani	"Sreća je tamo gdje si ti"	Advanced
2	Massimo	Ivo Kralj	"Žeđam"	Eliminated
3	Davor	Dora Juričić	"Waiting All Night"	Advanced
4	Davor	Iva Islambegović	"The Power of Love"	Eliminated
5	Vanna	Albina Grčić	"A Million Dreams"	Advanced
6	Vanna	Mia Reba	"Bésame Mucho"	Eliminated
7	Ivan	Ines Nožica	"Baby I Love You"	Eliminated
8	Ivan	Bernarda Bobovečki	"Where Did You Sleep Last Night"	Advanced

== The Battles ==
Color key:

Artist won the Battle and advanced to the Live Playoffs
Artist lost the Battle but was stolen by another coach and advanced to the Live Playoffs
Artist lost the Battle and was eliminated

Episodes	Coach	Order	Winner	Song	Loser	'Steal' result			
Episodes	Coach	Order	Winner	Song	Loser	Davor	Massimo	Vanna	Ivan
Episode 9 (Saturday, 1 February 2020)	Vanna	1	Mija Mihanović	"You Are The Reason"	Ivan Sever	—	—	—N/a	—
Episode 9 (Saturday, 1 February 2020)	Ivan Dečak	2	Karlo Vudrić	"Million Reasons"	Ružica Čović	—	—	—	—N/a
Episode 9 (Saturday, 1 February 2020)	Massimo Savić	3	Maria Florencia Celani	"How Deep Is Your Love"	Josip Palameta	✔	—N/a	—	—
Episode 9 (Saturday, 1 February 2020)	Davor Gobac	4	Vinko Ćemeraš	"Stay"	Petra Perišić	Team full	—	—	—
Episode 9 (Saturday, 1 February 2020)	Vanna	5	Darija Ramljak	"Odjednom ti"	Kristian Marolt	Team full	—	—N/a	—
Episode 9 (Saturday, 1 February 2020)	Ivan Dečak	6	Bernarda Bobovečki	"Feel"	Goran Orešković	Team full	—	✔	—N/a
Episode 9 (Saturday, 1 February 2020)	Massimo Savić	7	Adriana Vidović	"Sisters Are Doin' It for Themselves"	Bruna Levar	Team full	—N/a	Team full	—
Episode 9 (Saturday, 1 February 2020)	Davor Gobac	8	Tea Lovreković	"Dusk Till Dawn"	Maroje Strgačić	Team full	—	Team full	—
Episode 9 (Saturday, 1 February 2020)	Massimo Savić	9	Petra Roško	"It's Only Love"	Vjekoslav Banovčić	Team full	—N/a	Team full	✔
Episode 9 (Saturday, 1 February 2020)	Ivan Dečak	10	Jakob Grubišak	"Islands in the Stream"	Karla Ana Sabljak	Team full	—	Team full	Team full
Episode 9 (Saturday, 1 February 2020)	Vanna	11	Filip Rudan	"Lovely"	Albina Grčić	Team full	✔	Team full	Team full
Episode 9 (Saturday, 1 February 2020)	Davor Gobac	12	Dora Juričić	"State of Shock"	Aleksandar Baić	Team full	Team full	Team full	Team full

== Live shows ==
Color key:

Artist was saved by the Public's votes
Artist was saved by his/her coach
Artist was eliminated

=== Week 1: Live Playoffs (9 February) ===
Episode	Coach	Order	Artist	Song	Result
Episode 10 (Saturday, 8 February)	Ivan Dečak	1	Karlo Vudrić	"I Still Haven't Found What I'm Looking For"	Eliminated
Episode 10 (Saturday, 8 February)	Ivan Dečak	2	Bernarda Bobovečki	"Love On The Brain"	Ivan's choice
Episode 10 (Saturday, 8 February)	Ivan Dečak	3	Vjekoslav Banovčić	"Come Together"	Eliminated
Episode 10 (Saturday, 8 February)	Ivan Dečak	4	Jakob Grubišak	"Legendary"	Public's vote
Episode 10 (Saturday, 8 February)	Massimo Savić	5	Petra Roško	"Dok razmišljam o nama"	Eliminated
Episode 10 (Saturday, 8 February)	Massimo Savić	6	Maria Florencia Celani	"You Sang to Me"	Eliminated
Episode 10 (Saturday, 8 February)	Massimo Savić	7	Albina Grčić	"Nisi više moja bol"	Public's vote
Episode 10 (Saturday, 8 February)	Massimo Savić	8	Adriana Vidović	"I Have Nothing"	Massimo's choice
Episode 10 (Saturday, 8 February)	Davor Gobac	9	Dora Juričić	"Bound to You"	Davor's choice
Episode 10 (Saturday, 8 February)	Davor Gobac	10	Josip Palameta	"Tajna vještina"	Eliminated
Episode 10 (Saturday, 8 February)	Davor Gobac	11	Tea Lovreković	"You've Got the Love"	Eliminated
Episode 10 (Saturday, 8 February)	Davor Gobac	12	Vinko Ćemeraš	"Black"	Public's vote
Episode 10 (Saturday, 8 February)	Vanna	13	Goran Orešković	"Da li znaš da te volim"	Eliminated
Episode 10 (Saturday, 8 February)	Vanna	14	Darija Ramljak	"Bed of Roses"	Vanna's choice
Episode 10 (Saturday, 8 February)	Vanna	15	Filip Rudan	"Srce mi umire za njom"	Public's vote
Episode 10 (Saturday, 8 February)	Vanna	16	Mija Mihanović	"This Is Me"	Eliminated

=== Week 2: Semifinal (15 February) ===
Episode	Coach	Order	Artist	Song	Result
Episode 11 (Saturday, 15 February)	Vanna	1	Darija Ramljak	"Nocturno"	Eliminated
Episode 11 (Saturday, 15 February)	Vanna	2	Filip Rudan	"Sign of the Times"	Public's vote
Episode 11 (Saturday, 15 February)	Davor Gobac	3	Dora Juričić	"The Middle"	Eliminated
Episode 11 (Saturday, 15 February)	Davor Gobac	4	Vinko Ćemeraš	"Nothing Compares 2 U"	Public's vote
Episode 11 (Saturday, 15 February)	Ivan Dečak	5	Jakob Grubišak	"Castle on the Hill"	Eliminated
Episode 11 (Saturday, 15 February)	Ivan Dečak	6	Bernarda Bobovečki	"Jolene"	Public's vote
Episode 11 (Saturday, 15 February)	Massimo Savić	7	Adriana Vidović	"Stine"	Eliminated
Episode 11 (Saturday, 15 February)	Massimo Savić	8	Albina Grčić	"Fix You"	Public's vote

=== Week 3: Final (22 February) ===
Coach	Artist	Order	Audition Song	Order	Duet With Coach	Order	Solo Song	Result
Vanna	Filip Rudan	1	"Someone You Loved"	5	"Loš trenutak"	9	"All I Ask"	Runner-up
Massimo Savić	Albina Grčić	2	"En cambio no"	6	"Suze nam stale na put"	10	"Korake ti znam"	Third place
Ivan Dečak	Bernarda Bobovečki	3	"Hurt"	7	"Nama se nikud ne žuri"	11	"Only Love Can Hurt Like This"	Fourth place
Davor Gobac	Vinko Ćemeraš	4	"Pyro"	8	"Pinokio"	12	"Pelin i med"	Winner
