= Tick-Tock (Albina song) =

2021 single by Albina

Single by Albina
- Released: 13 February 2021
- Length: 3:00
- Label: Universal Music Croatia
- Composer: Branimir Mihaljević
- Lyricists: Max Cinnamon; Tihana Buklijaš Bakić
- Producer: Branimir Mihaljević

Albina singles chronology
| "No More Tears" (2021) | "Tick-Tock" (2021) | "La La Love" (2021) |

Music video
- "Tick-Tock" on YouTube

Eurovision Song Contest 2021 entry
- Country: Croatia
- Artist: Albina
- Languages: English, Croatian
- Composer: Branimir Mihaljević
- Lyricists: Max Cinnamon; Tihana Buklijaš Bakić

Finals performance
- Semi-final result: 11th
- Semi-final points: 110

Entry chronology
- ◄ "Divlji vjetre" (2020)
- "Guilty Pleasure" (2022) ►

Official performance video
- "Tick-Tock" (First semi-final) on YouTube

"Tick-Tock" is a song by Croatian singer Albina. The song was composed by Branimir Mihaljević and its lyrics were written by Max Cinnamon and Tihana Buklijaš Bakić. It represented Croatia in the Eurovision Song Contest 2021 after winning the national pre-selection competition Dora 2021, but failed to qualify for the Grand Final, placing 11th in the first semi-final.

== Background and release ==
"Tick-Tock" was one of fourteen songs commissioned by Hrvatska radiotelevizija (HRT) for Dora 2021, the Croatian national selection for the Eurovision Song Contest 2021. The song was composed by Branimir Mihaljević with Max Cinnamon providing the English language lyrics and Tihana Buklijaš Bakić writing the Croatian language lyrics. "Tick-Tock" premiered on 13 February 2021, when it was performed in Dora 2021. The song became available through digital retailers and streaming services on the same day through Universal Music Croatia.

== At Eurovision ==
=== National selection ===
HRT allowed artists and composers to submit their entries for Dora 2021 between 26 October 2020 and 10 December 2020 for the selection of its entry for the Eurovision Song Contest 2021. On 15 December 2020, Albina was announced as one of the fourteen participants in Dora 2021 with the song "Tick-Tock". In the final, held on 13 February 2021, she won the televote and jury vote, placing first with 198 points and thus went on to represent Croatia at the Eurovision Song Contest 2021.

=== In Rotterdam ===
The song was performed at the Eurovision Song Contest 2021 during the first semi-final on 18 May 2021 but did not qualify for the final. Doing so it became the first non-qualifier in Eurovision history to place in the top 10 with both televote and juries without making it to the final.

== Commercial performance ==
"Tick Tock" debuted atop the HR Top 40 chart, giving Grčić her first number-one single in Croatia. It marked her second entry on the chart, after "Imuna na strah". "Tick Tock" also debuted atop of all five regional charts of the HR Top 40.

== Track listing ==
Digital download
| No. | Title | Length |
|---|---|---|
| 1. | "Tick-Tock" | 3:00 |
| 2. | "Tick-Tock" (Dora Version) | 3:00 |
| 3. | "Tick-Tock" (Local Version) | 3:00 |
| 4. | "Tick-Tock" (Instrumental Version) | 3:00 |

== Charts ==
Chart performance for "Tick-Tock"
| Chart (2021) | Peak position |
|---|---|
| Croatia (HR Top 40) | 1 |
| Lithuania (AGATA) | 48 |
| Netherlands (Single Tip) | 24 |

== Release history ==
Release history and formats for "Tick-Tock"
| Region | Date | Format | Label | Ref. |
|---|---|---|---|---|
| Various | 13 February 2021 | Digital download; streaming | Universal Music Croatia | |
