= Tko to tamo pjeva? season 1 =

Television game show season

Tko to tamo pjeva?
- Season 1
- Starring: Gianna Apostolski; Luka Nižetić; Goran Vinčić; Alka Vuica
- Hosted by: Frano Ridjan
- Winners: Good singers: 11; Bad singers: 1
- No. of episodes: 12

Release
- Original network: Nova TV
- Original release: 15 March – 31 May 2024

Season chronology
- Next → Season 2

The first season of the Croatian television mystery music game show Tko to tamo pjeva? premiered on Nova TV on 15 March 2024.

== Gameplay ==
=== Format ===
According to the original South Korean rules, the guest artist and contestant must attempt to eliminate bad singers during its game phase. At the final performance, the last remaining mystery singer is revealed as either good or bad by means of a duet between them and one of the guest artists.

The contestant must eliminate one mystery singer at the end of each round, receiving €500 if they eliminate a bad singer. At the end of a game, if the contestant decides to walk away, they will keep the money had won in previous rounds; if they decide to risk for the last remaining mystery singer, they win €5,000 if a singer is good, or lose their all winnings if a singer is bad.

=== Rounds ===
1. Playback (Croatian: Ponavljanje)
  Nine mystery singers are divided into three groups of trios, and each of them would have to perform lip sync individually.
2. That was me! (Croatian: To sam ja!)
  The guest artist and contestant are presented with a video package containing possible clues by one of the mystery singers of their choice.
3. Secret studio (Croatian: Tajni studio)
  The guest artist and contestant are presented with video from a recording session by one of the mystery singers of their choice, but pitch-shifted to obscure their actual vocals.
4. Muted video (Croatian: Ima slike, nema tona)
  A muted video by one of the mystery singers of their choice that reveals only 0.3 seconds of their singing voice is played as an additional hint.
5. Vocal switch (Croatian: Glasoboj)
  The mystery singer lip syncs to the good singer's recording, then a bad singer's recording comes in the middle of the performance.
6. Interview (Croatian: Intervju)
  The guest artist and contestant may ask questions to the remaining mystery singers. Good singers are required to give truthful responses, while the bad singers must lie.

== Episodes ==
=== Guest artists ===
Legend:
Good singer
Bad singer
— The contestant chose to risk the money.
— The contestant chose to walk away with the money.

Episode		Guest artist (Note: Players' notes: For the returning guest artists (who also include foreigners and former good singers), names are displayed in italics.; For the mixed groups, names who identified as bad singers are displayed in italics.)	Contestant	Mystery singers (In their respective numbers and aliases)								
#	Date	Guest artist	Contestant	Elimination order								Winner
#	Date	Guest artist	Contestant	Playback			That was me!	Secret studio	Muted video	Vocal switch	Interview	Winner
1	15 March 2024	Indira Levak (Colonia)	Dražen Trogrlić → €2,500	3. Valentina Krajna; (Tennis Player)	4. Marko Stanković; (Zdravko Čolić Impersonator)	9. Srećko Savretić; (Funeral Musician)	6. Dino Lipovac; (Physiotherapist)	1. Blanka Androšević; (Belly Dancer)	2. Robert Modrić; (Boxer)	8. Petra Kuhar; (Architect)	5. Magdalena Čavka; (Journalist)	7. Marija Božičević; Housewife
2	22 March 2024	Jasna Zlokić	Biserka Hajdek → €5,000	1. (Karaoke Queen)	6. (Jockey Teacher)	9. (Baker)	8. Una Ibrahimagić; (Pianist)	2. Zoltan Vukelić; (Chimney Sweep)	5. Zoe Bakalov; (Make-up Artist)	7. Sanja Horvat; (Postwoman)	4. (Polyglot)	3. Dario Terglav; Construction Worker
3	29 March 2024	Maja Šuput	Hrvoje Barić → €2,500	3. (Pastry Chef)	5. Katarina Vukadin; (Yoga Instructor)	7. Eduard Pešun; (Hunter)	9. Đurđa Antolović; (Fashion Designer)	4. (Opera Student)	6. Ivano Črep; (High School Graduate)	8. Josip Čolić; (Fitness Trainer)	2. Ante Balen (Footballer)	1. Karla Miletić; Mathematician
4	5 April 2024	Luka Nižetić	Andra Višnjić → €3,000	1. (Lifeguard)	5. (Ballet Dancer)	9. (Flautist)	8. Miran Belaić; (High Jumper)	6. Bodan Krajnc; (Policeman)	7. Jelena Cvijić; (Sport Shooter)	2. (Chair Dancer)	4. Marko Johović; (Medical Technician)	3. Ivan Knezović; Fumigator
5	12 April 2024	Joško Čagalj Jole (Note: Season highlight: Foreign guest artist: Joško Čagalj Jole (DEU; ep. 5))	Brankica Jurić → €2,500	1. (Chef)	6. Jakov Bjelac; (Beekeeper)	8. (Detective)	4. (Firefighter)	9. (Hairdresser)	2. Maid Džombić; (Traveller)	7. Antonio Tkalec; (Restaurateur)	5. Antonio Šarić; (Radio DJ)	3. Marija Petrović; Jelena Rozga Impersonator
6	19 April 2024	Franka Batelić	Natali Rade → €5,000	3. Ernest Marnika; (Programmer)	2. (Retiree)	8. (Angler)	5. Meri Goldašić; (Food Influencer)	4. Damir Rodiger; (Electric Guitarist)	7. (Physicist)	6. Ivan Knez; (Plumber)	9. Ela Smerdel; (Abba Impersonator)	1. Zvonimir Paponja; Puppeteer
7	26 April 2024	Damir Kedžo	Josip Grubešić → €3,000	2. Martina Jakšić Rodiger; (Conductor)	6. (Figure Skater)	9. (Latin Dancer)	3. Filip Rakočević; (Logistics Coordinator)	7. (Auto Mechanic)	5. Denis Kovač; (Librarian)	4. (Miss Photogenic)	1. (Stuntman)	8. Petra Banac; Agronomy Student
8	3 May 2024	Zsa Zsa	Matea Katić → €5,000	3. Barbara Gregčević; (Florist)	4. (Waiter)	8. Franto Romano; (Mime)	7. Gloria Berger; (Truck Driver)	2. Ivo Marijan Planinić; (Theatre Actor)	9. Bruno Tomašić; (Busker)	6. Kristina Mitak; (Farmer)	5. Nevenka Tokić; (Photographer)	1. Ivona Tomiek; Interpreter
9	10 May 2024	Domenica Žuvela	Paula Eleta Barišić → €2,500	3. (Camerawoman)	5. (Train Conductor)	7. Emanuel Srpak; (Poet)	2. Lea Milanović; (Costume Designer)	4. Marina Komljenović; (Pedicurist)	8. Maja Štrbac; (English Teacher)	6. (Shoemaker)	9. (Waste Collector)	1. Stand-up Comedian
10	17 May 2024	Alka Vuica	Lana Gjurić → €5,000	2. (Nutritionist)	4. Elizabeth Zacero; (Pole Dancer)	7. (Cyclist)	6. (Kindergarten Teacher)	5. Ivan Ilić; (Marathon Runner)	8. Andrea Granić; (French Teacher)	1. (Clown)	9. (Painter)	3. Toni Mandušić; Acoustic Guitarist
11	24 May 2024	Zorica Kondža	Filip Rebić → €5,000	1. Marko Martinović; (Šokci)	6. (Judge)	9. (Boy Scout)	3. Nikola Stazić; (Seaman)	8. (Model)	4. Tamara Ramadi; (Fortune Teller)	5. (Mountaineer)	2. (Seamstress)	7. Sandi Bibulić; Graphic Designer
12	31 May 2024	Giuliano Đanić	Luka Končarević → €5,000	3. Ana Jović; (Trumpeter)	5. Ružica Selak; (Godmother)	8. Antonia Knežević; (Teacher)	6. Irena Curić; (Art Historian)	7. Matija Troha; (Marketing Specialist)	1. Marin Sovar; (Wedding Dress Designer)	4. Mirna Ružić; (Music Instructor)	9. (Diver)	2. Toni Leskovar; Cultivator

=== Panelists ===
Legend:
Regular panelist
Guest panelist

Apps		Panelists in attendance (Sorted by first appearance, with episode designations)
g#	p#	Panelists in attendance (Sorted by first appearance, with episode designations)
12	2	Gianna Apostolski and Goran Vinčić (1–12)
11	2	Luka Nižetić (1–3, 5–12); Alka Vuica (1–9, 11–12)
1	2	Momčilo Otašević (4); Maja Šuput (10)
