= Tko to tamo pjeva? season 2 =

Television game show season

Tko to tamo pjeva?
- Season 2
- Starring: Gianna Apostolski; Luka Nižetić; Goran Vinčić; Alka Vuica
- Hosted by: Frano Ridjan
- Winners: Good singers: 11; Bad singers: 1
- No. of episodes: 12

Release
- Original network: Nova TV; Nova BH (delayed telecast)
- Original release: 7 March – 23 May 2025

Season chronology
- ← Previous; Season 1 Next → Season 3

The second season of the Croatian television mystery music game show Tko to tamo pjeva? premiered on Nova TV on 7 March 2025, followed by its Bosnian airing debut on Nova BH through a delayed telecast on 13 March 2025.

== Gameplay ==
=== Format ===
According to the original South Korean rules, the guest artist and contestant must attempt to eliminate bad singers during its game phase. At the final performance, the last remaining mystery singer is revealed as either good or bad by means of a duet between them and one of the guest artists.

The contestant must eliminate one mystery singer at the end of each round, receiving €500 if they eliminate a bad singer. At the end of a game, if the contestant decides to walk away, they will keep the money had won in previous rounds; if they decide to risk for the last remaining mystery singer, they win €5,000 if a singer is good, or lose their all winnings if a singer is bad.

=== Rounds ===
1. First impression (Croatian: Prvi dojam)
  The guest artist and contestant are given some time to observe and examine each mystery singer based on their appearance.
2. Playback (Croatian: Ponavljanje)
  Eight mystery singers are divided into two groups of quartets, and each of them would have to perform lip sync individually.
3. That was me! (Croatian: To sam ja!)
  The guest artist and contestant are presented with a video package containing possible clues by one of the mystery singers of their choice.
4. Secret studio (Croatian: Tajni studio)
  The guest artist and contestant are presented with video from a recording session by one of the mystery singers of their choice, but pitch-shifted to obscure their actual vocals.
5. Muted video (Croatian: Ima slike, nema tona)
  A muted video by one of the mystery singers of their choice that reveals only 0.3 seconds of their singing voice is played as an additional hint.
6. Vocal switch (Croatian: Glasoboj)
  The mystery singer lip syncs to the good singer's recording, then a bad singer's recording comes in the middle of the performance.
7. Interview (Croatian: Intervju)
  The guest artist and contestant may ask questions to the remaining mystery singers. Good singers are required to give truthful responses, while the bad singers must lie.

== Episodes ==
=== Guest artists ===
Legend:
Good singer
Bad singer
— The contestant chose to risk the money.
— The contestant chose to walk away with the money.

Episode		Guest artist (Note: Players' notes: For the returning guest artists (who also include foreigners and former good singers), names are displayed in italics.; For the mixed groups, names who identified as bad singers are displayed in italics.)	Contestant	Mystery singers (In their respective numbers and aliases)								
#	Date	Guest artist	Contestant	Elimination order								Winner
#	Date	Guest artist	Contestant	First impression	Playback		That was me!	Secret studio	Muted video	Vocal switch	Interview	Winner
1	7 March 2025	Miroslav Škoro	Kristina Bešić → €5,000	6. (Jeweller)	1. Mario Žunar; (Impersonator)	8. Anita Rozata Nikić; (Footballer)	7. Franjo Oreški; (Gravedigger)	5. Nikolina Družić; (Housemaid)	9. Isabela Grladinović Hrdžić; (Tourist Guide)	3. Josip Popović; (Herlock Sholmes)	2. Marina Godanj; (Farmer)	4. Danijel Grozdek; Utility Clerk
2	14 March 2025	Dražen Zečić	Vlatka Bolanča → €3,000	7. (Waitress)	3. (Retired Rockstar)	5. Jadranka Švogor; (Chess Player)	2. Sanja Azenić; (Astrologer)	8. (Dog Breeder)	1. Lucas Statzu; (Circus Performer)	4. Monika Shole; (Auto Enthusiast)	9. (Judoka)	3. Štefan Đurković; Percussion Instructor
3	21 March 2025	Andrea Šušnjara	Krešimir Trunić → €5,000	4. Josip Darapi; (Excavator)	3. (Numismatist)	9. (Hairdresser)	6. (Swimmer)	5. Suzana Horvat; (Mountaineer)	1. Zoran Đorđević; (Security Guard)	8. Stipe Rukavina; (Karateka)	2. (Interior Designer)	7. Anita Nježić; Folklorist
4	28 March 2025	Hanka Paldum (Note: Season highlights: Foreign guest artists: Hanka Paldum (BIH; ep. 4) and Sergej Ćetković (MNE; ep. 11))	Jan Mihaljević → €0	2. Monika Karahmet; (Stewardess)	1. Sven Pocrnić; (Pianist)	7. Branko Stanić; (Musical Actor)	5. (Bodybuilder)	9. (Magician)	3. (Motorcycle Racer)	8. (Botanist)	4. (Banker)	6. Interior Designer
5	4 April 2025	Sandi Cenov	Jovana Prpić → €3,000	7. Zoran Goman; (Welder)	3. Jolanda Fišer; (Hypnotist)	6. Karla Ivančić; (Cyclist)	8. Jasminka Vuković; (Gardener)	9. Manuel Crnobrnja; (Chef)	2. Marko Kovačić; (Woodworker)	1. Tea Anzulović; (Seamstress)	4. Ivana Marijanović; (Driving Instructor)	5. Darus Despot; TV Host
6	11 April 2025	Nives Celzijus	Lovro Vuković → €5,000	6. (Marathon Runner)	4. (Motorcycle Rider)	8. (Acrobat)	2. Tomislav Rubinić FunTom; (Rapper)	7. (Reader)	9. Željko Novosel; (Table Tennis Player)	3. Ivanka Seka Marijić; (Choir Singer)	1. Matea Nuić; (Doorkeeper)	5. Stefany Žužić; Skier
7	18 April 2025	Alen Bičević	Melita Rakovac → €5,000	6. Dina Kljaić; (Soldier)	1. (Fortune Teller)	7. (Inspector)	4. Andrijana Mudrinović; (Restaurant Manager)	8. Nina Vorkapić; (Train Conductor)	5. Jerko Drljo; (Breakdancer)	9. (Bowler)	2. Marin Kegalj; (Potter)	3. Samantha Pernek; Wedding Singer
8	25 April 2025	Alka Vuica	Tajana Ančurovski → €5,000	9. Vjekica Hodonj; (Dentist)	2. Anita Bogdan; (Sommelier)	7. Ivana Levanić; (Law Student)	6. Lovro Kolarić; (Taxi Driver)	3. Lovro Sorić; (Logistics Coordinator)	5. Patricia Gašparini; (Stiletto Dancer)	1. Boris Benčić; (The Voice of Slavonia)	4. Jasna Ožeg; (Flautist)	8. Zdravka Golub Katić; Nanny
9	2 May 2025	Minea	Ivan Sesar → €5,000	3. (Kickboxer)	2. (Figure Skater)	8. (Accordionist)	5. Katarina Mikas; (Butcher)	1. (Quiz Show Host)	9. (Eurovision Fan)	4. Tajana Jezernik; (Teacher)	6. Azra Husić; (Lab Technician)	7. Marin Novaković; Vulcanizer
10	9 May 2025	Luka Nižetić	Maja Đudarić → €5,000	4. Radojka Galovac; (Cosmetologist)	2. Sanela Vuković; (Miss Požega)	7. Tena Đuretek; (Psychologist)	1. (Historian)	5. (Firefighter)	8. (Prom Queen)	9. Alen Skopljak; (Basketball Player)	6. (Kindergarten Teacher)	3. Sanela Soldo Kovačević; Lady Cop
11	16 May 2025	Sergej Ćetković	Paula Mikinac → €5,000	9. (Freight Forwarder)	2. Ljubica Ceković; (Janitress)	7. Josip Piteša; (Fashion Enthusiast)	3. (Mountaineer)	1. (Handball Player)	6. Donatella Krajinović; (Secretary)	5. (Optician)	4. Anamarija Šakić; (Cheerdancer)	8. Gloria Hršak; Dance Instructor
12	23 May 2025	Saša Lozar	Josip Dombaj → €5,000	8. Saša Grubišić; (Electrician)	3. Martina Jagatić; (Severina Impersonator)	5. Andrijana Derdić; (Fitness Instructor)	1. Mateo Vujatović; (Bellman)	4. Anita Galović; (Pharmacist)	2. Edin Čaušević; (Filmophile)	9. Helena Galovac; (Hajduk Split Cheerdancer)	6. Ivanka Madunović; (Saxophonist)	7. David Balint; Guitarist

=== Panelists ===
Legend:
Regular panelist
Guest panelist

Apps		Panelists in attendance (Sorted by first appearance, with episode designations)
g#	p#	Panelists in attendance (Sorted by first appearance, with episode designations)
12	2	Gianna Apostolski and Goran Vinčić (1–12)
11	1	Alka Vuica (1–7, 9–12)
9	1	Luka Nižetić (1–5, 7, 9, 11–12)
1	4	Ana Begić Tahiri (6); Biserka Hajdek and Fabijan Pavao Medvešek (8); Marko Grubnić (10)
