= Tko to tamo pjeva? season 3 =

Television game show season

Tko to tamo pjeva?
- Season 3
- Starring: Gianna Apostolski; Luka Nižetić; Goran Vinčić; Alka Vuica
- Hosted by: Frano Ridjan
- Winners: Good singers: 10; Bad singers: 0
- No. of episodes: Regular: 8; Special: 2; Overall: 10

Release
- Original network: Nova TV
- Original release: Regular season: 1 October 2026 – present; Specials: 24 April – 1 May 2026

Season chronology
- ← Previous; Season 2

The third season of the Croatian television mystery music game show Tko to tamo pjeva? began airing on Nova TV with back-to-back charity games on 24 April and 1 May 2026, ahead of its proper season premiere on 1 October 2026. (Note: Regular games for the 4th season have been first released by Nova Play, before the actual linear television broadcasts by Nova TV on the following day.)

== Gameplay ==
=== Format ===
According to the original South Korean rules, the guest artist and contestant(s) must attempt to eliminate bad singers during its game phase. At the final performance, the last remaining mystery singer is revealed as either good or bad by means of a duet between them and one of the guest artists. (Note: Gameplay note: The number of contestants are set to one (for 6 episodes) or a group of two (for 4 episodes).)

The contestant(s) must eliminate one mystery singer at the end of each round, receiving €500 if they eliminate a bad singer. At the end of a game, if the contestant decides to walk away, they will keep the money had won in previous rounds; if they decide to risk for the last remaining mystery singer, they win €5,000 if a singer is good, or lose their all winnings if a singer is bad.

=== Rounds ===
1. First impression (Croatian: Prvi dojam)
  The guest artist and contestant are given some time to observe and examine each mystery singer based on their appearance.
2. Playback (Croatian: Ponavljanje)
  Eight mystery singers are divided into two groups of quartets, and each of them would have to perform lip sync individually.
3. That was me! (Croatian: To sam ja!)
  The guest artist and contestant are presented with a video package containing possible clues by one of the mystery singers of their choice.
4. Secret studio (Croatian: Tajni studio)
  The guest artist and contestant are presented with video from a recording session by one of the mystery singers of their choice, but pitch-shifted to obscure their actual vocals.
5. Muted video (Croatian: Ima slike, nema tona)
  A muted video by one of the mystery singers of their choice that reveals only 0.3 seconds of their singing voice is played as an additional hint.
6. Vocal switch (Croatian: Glasoboj)
  The mystery singer lip syncs to the good singer's recording, then a bad singer's recording comes in the middle of the performance.
7. Interview (Croatian: Intervju)
  The guest artist and contestant may ask questions to the remaining mystery singers. Good singers are required to give truthful responses, while the bad singers must lie.

== Episodes ==
=== Guest artists ===
Legend:
Good singer
Bad singer
— The contestant(s) chose to risk the money.
— The contestant(s) chose to walk away with the money.

Episode			Guest artist (Note: Players' notes: For the returning guest artists (who also include foreigners and former good singers), names are displayed in italics.; For the mixed groups, names who identified as bad singers are displayed in italics.)	Contestant(s)	Mystery singers (In their respective numbers and aliases)								
#	Dates		Guest artist	Contestant(s)	Elimination order								Winner
#	Nova Play	Nova TV	Guest artist	Contestant(s)	First impression	Playback		That was me!	Secret studio	Muted video	Vocal switch	Interview	Winner
Special	24 April 2026		Luka Nižetić	Valentina Baus and Petar Pereža → €5,000	8. (Window Cleaner)	3. (Butcher)	7. (Marriage Counselor)	5. Mihovil Jakšić; (Boxer)	1. Martina Trgovec; (Bartender)	4. Dina Čolo; (Robotics Engineer)	6. Željka Lisičak; (Licitar Maker)	2. Dini Jurjec; (Web Designer)	9. Andrea Galović; Rock Band Frontwoman
Special	1 May 2026		Alka Vuica	Ana Begić Tahiri and Filip Juričić → €5,000	3. (Maths Teacher)	4. (Cowboy)	8. Đurđa Habel; (Radio Editor)	9. (Flora and Fauna Enthusiast)	6. (Delivery Driver)	1. Radojka Galovac; (Nordic Walker)	5. Kristina Krstičević; (New Year's Eve Singer)	7. Iris Kovačić; (Judo Instructor)	2. Martin Kuzmanović; Family Farm Owner
1	1 October 2026	2 October 2026	Nives Celzijus	Sunčica Andraković → €5,000	3. Igor Mitrović; (Machine Operator)	4. (Equestrienne)	6. Antonio Juričić; (Pizza Maker)	9. Laura Dunđer; (Goalkeeper)	5. Vanessa Kralj; (Pianist)	7. Jadranka Kraina; (Housewife)	2. (Majorette)	1. Marko Matošević; (Tea Vendor)	8. Dino Kljenak; Make-up Artist
2	8 October 2026	9 October 2026	Neda Ukraden	Daniel Grabar and Ana Despotušić → €5,000	3. (Tennis Player)	2. Ana Vujica; (Farmer)	6. (Korean Language Student)	7. (Toy Designer)	9. Kaja Horvat; (Massage Therapist)	1. (Stand-up Comedian)	8. Vedran Ljubenko; (Journalist)	4. (Philippines) Camille Faith Bequio; (Nanny)	5. Luka Čular; Florist
3	15 October 2026	16 October 2026	Emilija Kokić	Nikola and Ivana Trevižan → €5,000	1. (Mushroom Picker)	5. (Ornithologist)	8. (Crocheter)	4. (Football Referee)	2. Filip Tomičić; (Actor)	6. (Dairymaid)	7. Joško Marković; (Judoka)	9. (Drummer)	3. Antonio Brusić; Multi-instrumentalist
4	22 October 2026	23 October 2026	Ivana Banfić	Katica Janjanin → €5,000	9. (Pest Control Technician)	1. Petar Čulić; (Guitarist)	8. (Chimney Sweep)	6. Ravena Posavec; (Textile Conservator)	7. (Lawyer)	5. Lucas Statzu; (Comic Book Artist)	3. (Wigmaker)	2. (Chestnut Vendor)	4. Katarina Mulavdić; TV Host
5	29 October 2026	30 October 2026	Zdenka Kovačiček	Danijel Volarević → €5,000	3. Nikolina Volareva; (Jewelry Designer)	1. (Ninja)	8. (Psychologist)	2. (Maid)	5. Paula Kostelac; (Agricultural Technician)	4. Goran Deželić; (Beekeeper)	9. Marko Musil; (Turner)	7. Antonia Knežević; (Laboratory Technician)	6. Nikola Batinović; Sound Engineer
6	5 November 2026	6 November 2026	ToMa (Note: Season highlight: Foreign guest artist: ToMa (BIH; ep. 6))	Ani Škorić → €5,000	7. Ivan Stepić; (Auto Mechanic)	2. (Quiz Enthusiast)	6. Kristijan Nikšić; (Plastic Surgeon)	3. (Market Vendor)	5. Anel Tomašić; (Table Tennis Player)	9. Vesna Malarić; (Seamstress)	1. Ramona Vinković; (Wedding Singer)	8. (Viticulturist)	4. Melisa Dedić; Policewoman
7	12 November 2026	13 November 2026	Neda Parmać (Feminnem)	Paula Čupić → €5,000	3. Ernest Bereč; (Puppeteer)	5. Goran Popek; (Dispatcher)	8. (Pedicurist)	1. (Cook)	2. Željka Grđan; (Accountant)	7. Petra Siladi; (Photo Book Author)	6. Antonio Abičić; (Podcaster)	9. Domagoj Biondić; (Guitar Instructor)	4. Sindy Budimir; Football Coach
8	19 November 2026	20 November 2026	Nives Celzijus	Helena Šanda Mitiska → €5,000	8. (Chess Player)	4. (Electrical Engineering Professor)	9. (Wedding Planner)	6. (Pyrography Artist)	1. (Toolmaker)	2. (Manicurist)	3. (Colonia Fan)	5. (Waiter)	7. Andrea Andrijević; Librarian
9	26 November 2026	27 November 2026	TBA	TBA	1. ()	2. ()	3. ()	4. ()	5. ()	6. ()	7. ()	8. ()	9. ()
10	3 December 2026	4 December 2026	TBA	TBA	1. ()	2. ()	3. ()	4. ()	5. ()	6. ()	7. ()	8. ()	9. ()

=== Panelists ===
Legend:
Regular panelist
Guest panelist

Apps		Panelists in attendance (Sorted by first appearance, with episode designations)
g#	p#	Panelists in attendance (Sorted by first appearance, with episode designations)
10	2	Gianna Apostolski and Goran Vinčić (1–8; sp. 1–2)
9	2	Alka Vuica (1–8; sp. 1); Luka Nižetić (1–8; sp. 2)
1	2	Laura Gnjatović (sp. 1); Mirna Medaković (sp. 2)
