= Croatia in the Eurovision Song Contest 2020 =

- Eurovision Song Contest 2020
- Country: Croatia
- Selection process: Dora 2020
- Selection date: 29 February 2020

Competing entry
- Song: "Divlji vjetre"
- Artist: Damir Kedžo
- Songwriters: Ante Pecotić

Placement
- Final result: Contest cancelled

Participation chronology

Croatia was set to be represented at the Eurovision Song Contest 2020 with the song "Divlji vjetre" written by Ante Pecotić. The song was performed by Damir Kedžo. The Croatian broadcaster Croatian Radiotelevision (HRT) organised the national final Dora 2020 to select the Croatian entry for the 2020 contest in Rotterdam, Netherlands. Fourteen entries competed in the national final on 29 February 2020 and "Divlji vjetre" performed by Damir Kedžo was selected as the winner following the combination of votes from five regional juries and a public televote.

Croatia was drawn to compete in the first semi-final of the Eurovision Song Contest which took place on 12 May 2020. However, the contest was cancelled due to the COVID-19 pandemic.

== Background ==
Prior to the 2020 contest, Croatia had participated in the Eurovision Song Contest twenty-five times since its first entry in 1993. The nation's best result in the contest was fourth, which it achieved on two occasions: in 1996 with the song "Sveta ljubav" performed by Maja Blagdan and in 1999 with the song "Marija Magdalena" performed by Doris Dragović. Following the introduction of semi-finals in 2004, Croatia had thus far featured in seven finals. Since 2018, the Croatian entries failed to qualify from the semi-finals; the last time Croatia competed in the final was in 2017 with the song "My Friend" performed by Jacques Houdek. In 2019, Croatia failed to qualify to the final with Roko and the song "The Dream".

The Croatian national broadcaster, Croatian Radiotelevision (HRT), broadcasts the event within Croatia and organises the selection process for the nation's entry. HRT confirmed Croatia's participation in the 2020 Eurovision Song Contest on 10 September 2019. Between 1993 and 2011, HRT organised the national final Dora in order to select the Croatian entry for the Eurovision Song Contest. In 2012 and 2013, the broadcaster opted to internally select the entry. After missing the contest in 2014 and 2015, the Croatian broadcaster continued the internal selection procedure between 2016 and 2018. In 2019, HRT has used Dora to select Croatia's entry, a method that was continued for their 2020 participation.

== Before Eurovision ==
=== Dora 2020 ===
Dora 2020 was the twenty-first edition of the Croatian national selection Dora which selected Croatia's entry for the Eurovision Song Contest 2020. The competition consisted of sixteen entries competing in one final on 29 February 2020 at the Marino Cvetković Sports Hall in Opatija, hosted by Duško Ćurlić, Mirko Fodor, Zlata Mück Sušec and Doris Pinčić Rogoznica. The show was broadcast on HRT 1 as well as online via the broadcaster's streaming service HRTi.

==== Competing entries ====
On 5 November 2019, HRT opened a submission period where artists and composers were able to submit their entries to the broadcaster with the deadline on 15 December 2019. Songs submitted were required to be in English, French, Italian or Croatian. 181 entries were received by the broadcaster during the submission period. A seven-member expert committee consisting of Zlatko Turkalj Turki (HRT), Dinko Komadina (HRT), Željko Barba (HDS), Tomislav Mrduljaš (HDS), Ivana Vrdoljak Vanna (HGU), Branimir Jovanovac (HGU) and Tomislav Štengl (HRT) reviewed the received submissions and selected sixteen artists and songs for the competition. HRT announced the competing entries on 23 December 2019 and among the artists was Goran Karan who represented Croatia in the Eurovision Song Contest 2000. On 24 December 2019, Goran Karan withdrew his song "My Legacy Is Love", written by Nikša Bratoš, after it was revealed to have already been publicly performed and replaced with "Jušto" performed by Elis Lovrić. The running order of the final was determined by HRT and announced on 17 February 2020.

Artist	Song	Songwriter(s)
Aklea Neon	"Zovi ju mama"	Dorotea Zovko, Pavle Kladarin
Alen Vitasović and Božidarka Matija Čerina	"Da se ne zatare"	Robert Pilepić
Bojan Jambrošić	"Više od riječi"	Antonija Šola
Colonia	"Zidina"	Boris Đurđević, Valerija Đurđević
Damir Kedžo	"Divlji vjetre"	Ante Pecotić
Đana	"One"	Rando Stipišić
Edi Abazi	"Coming Home"	Srđan Sekulović Skansi
Elis Lovrić	"Jušto"	Elis Lovrić
Indira Levak	"You Will Never Break My Heart"	Branimir Mihaljević, Ambrogio Crotti, Doron Medalie
Jure Brkljača	"Hajde nazovi me!"	Miroslav Rus
Lorena Bućan	"Drowning"	Ivan Huljić
Lorenzo, Dino Purić and Reper iz sobe	"Vrati se iz Irske"	Ivan Grgić, Marko Kantolić
Marin Jurić Čivro	"Naivno"	Boris Kolarić, Maja Kolarić, Marko Matijević Sekul
Mia Negovetić	"When It Comes to You"	Linnea Deb, Anderz Wrethov, Denniz Jamm, Mia Negovetić
Nikola Marjanović	"Let's Forgive"	Adi Karaselimović
Zdenka Kovačiček	"Love, Love, Love"	Branimir Mihaljević, Mario Mihaljević

==== Final ====
The final took place on 29 February 2020. The winner, "Divlji vjetre" performed by Damir Kedžo, was determined by a 50/50 combination of votes from five regional juries and a public televote. Mia Negovetić and Damir Kedžo were tied at 31 points each but since Damir Kedžo received the most votes from the public he was declared the winner. In addition to the performances of the competing entries, the show was opened with 2019 Croatian Eurovision entrant Roko performing his song "Krila", while Albina Grčić, Bernarda Bobovečki, Filip Rudan and Roko performed as the interval acts.

Final – 29 February 2020
R/O	Artist	Song	Jury	Televote				Total	Place
R/O	Artist	Song	Jury	Phone	SMS	Total	Points	Total	Place
1	Elis Lovrić	"Jušto"	11	342	304	646	1	12	12
2	Bojan Jambrošić	"Više od riječi"	5	927	279	1,206	7	12	10
3	Edi Abazi	"Coming Home"	3	829	524	1,353	8	11	13
4	Zdenka Kovačiček	"Love, Love, Love"	6	1,558	599	2,157	12	18	6
5	Alen Vitasović and Božidarka Matija Čerina	"Da se ne zatare"	2	1,514	815	2,329	13	15	9
6	Đana	"One"	8	1,084	403	1,487	9	17	7
7	Aklea Neon	"Zovi ju mama"	13	997	768	1,765	10	23	4
8	Nikola Marjanović	"Let's Forgive"	10	453	367	820	2	12	11
9	Lorenzo, Dino Purić and Reper iz sobe	"Vrati se iz Irske"	1	608	339	947	3	4	16
10	Marin Jurić Čivro	"Naivno"	4	677	409	1,086	6	10	15
11	Lorena Bućan	"Drowning"	9	1,171	682	1,853	11	20	5
12	Indira Levak	"You Will Never Break My Heart"	14	3,414	2,127	5,541	14	28	3
13	Jure Brkljača	"Hajde nazovi me!"	7	698	313	1,011	4	11	14
14	Colonia	"Zidina"	12	732	309	1,041	5	17	8
15	Mia Negovetić	"When It Comes to You"	16	7,954	3,641	11,595	15	31	2
16	Damir Kedžo	"Divlji vjetre"	15	7,985	3,870	11,855	16	31	1

Detailed Regional Jury Votes
R/O	Song	Varaždin and Čakovec	Zagreb	Rijeka	Split	Osijek	Total	Points
1	"Jušto"	5	7	7	11	14	44	11
2	"Više od riječi"	13	3	1	6	4	27	5
3	"Coming Home"	12	4	4	5	1	26	3
4	"Love, Love, Love"	10	6	11	3	9	39	6
5	"Da se ne zatare"	4	2	9	4	2	21	2
6	"One"	11	8	8	12	3	42	8
7	"Zovi ju mama"	14	14	10	2	12	52	13
8	"Let's Forgive"	8	9	14	7	6	44	10
9	"Vrati se iz Irske"	3	5	3	1	8	20	1
10	"Naivno"	1	1	6	9	10	27	4
11	"Drowning"	7	10	5	8	13	43	9
12	"You Will Never Break My Heart"	9	15	13	16	11	64	14
13	"Hajde nazovi me!"	6	11	2	14	7	40	7
14	"Zidina"	2	12	15	10	5	44	12
15	"When It Comes to You"	15	16	16	15	16	78	16
16	"Divlji vjetre"	16	13	12	13	15	69	15

Members of the Jury
Jury	Members
Varaždin and Čakovec	Ivica Grudiček – HRT; Rajko Suhodolčan – HDS; Zsa Zsa – HGU
Zagreb	Robert Urlić – HRT; Denis Dumančić – HDS; Lara Antić – HGU
Rijeka	Albert Petrović – HRT; Ivan Pešut – HDS; Antonela Doko – HGU
Split	Eduard Gracin – HRT; Hari Rončević – HDS; Giuliano Đanić – HGU
Osijek	Zvonimir Mandić – HRT; Marija Vestić – HDS; Mia Dimšić – HGU

== At Eurovision ==
According to Eurovision rules, all nations with the exceptions of the host country and the "Big Five" (France, Germany, Italy, Spain and the United Kingdom) are required to qualify from one of two semi-finals in order to compete for the final; the top ten countries from each semi-final progress to the final. The European Broadcasting Union (EBU) split up the competing countries into six different pots based on voting patterns from previous contests, with countries with favourable voting histories put into the same pot. On 28 January 2020, a special allocation draw was held which placed each country into one of the two semi-finals, as well as which half of the show they would perform in. Croatia was placed into the first semi-final, to be held on 12 May 2020, and was scheduled to perform in the second half of the show. However, due to the COVID-19 pandemic, the contest was cancelled.

Prior to the Eurovision Song Celebration YouTube broadcast in place of the semi-finals, it was revealed that Croatia was set to perform in position 11, following the entry from Malta and before the entry from Azerbaijan.
