= Mujić =

Origin
- Language: Bosnian via Turkish from Arabic
- Meaning: son of Mujo, in which Mujo is a Serbo-Croatian hypocorism of either Mustafa or Muhamed
- Region of origin: Bosnia and Herzegovina

Mujić is a Bosnian surname. Its literal meaning is "descendant of Mujo" (Mujo being a nickname for a person with the given name of either Mustafa or Muhamed) and it may indicate Muslim religious affiliation of its bearers. People with the name include:

- Deniz Mujić (born 1990), Austrian footballer of Bosnian descent
- Muhamed Mujić (1933–2016), Bosnian footballer
- Muzafer Mujić (born 1931), Bosnian physiologist
- Nazif Mujić (1970–2018), Bosnian actor
- Leo Mujić (born 1975), Croatian choreographer
