= Merika =

Merika may refer to:

- 'Merika, a 1984 Philippine film
- Merika Coleman (born 1973), an American politician from Alabama
- Merika Enne (born 1992), a Finnish snowboarder
- Merika, a 2017 album by Elis Lovrić

== See also ==
- Merica, a genus of sea snails
- America (disambiguation)
- Marika, a popular character from the game Elden Ring
