= Nikola Marjanović (singer) =

Croatian singer

- Born: 6 December 1977 (age 48); Zagreb, SR Croatia, SFR Yugoslavia (today Croatia)
- Genres: Pop
- Occupations: Singer; songwriter
- Years active: 1997–present
- Labels: Menart, Rubikon Sound Factory

Nikola Marjanović (born 6 December 1977) is a Croatian singer. He was the lead singer for the pop rock bands Sane and Radio Luksemburg.

== Early life ==
Majranović was born in Zagreb in the Yugoslav republic of Croatia. His father, Hrvoje Marjanović, was one of the co-founders of the Croatian country band Plava Trava Zaborava.

== Career ==
Marjanović co-founded Sane, a pop-rock band from Zagreb, Croatia. The band released two studio albums, Do Not Cover (2013) and About Time (2014). In 2009 the band participated at the semi-final of Dora 2009 with the song "Dečko" but failed to qualify to the final. In 2012, Marjanović joined the band Radio Luksemburg as the lead vocalist. The band released two studio albums, U boji (2011) and 100 metara do sreće (2013). On 21 November 2019 it was announced that Marjanović will compete at the 67th edition of the Zagreb Festival with the song "Vrati mi se ti". He performed the song on 24 January 2020 and finished third, placing behind winner Marko Kutlić and runner-ups Nina Kraljić and Marin Jurić Čivro. Followed by the performance on Zagreb Festival the song peaked at number six in Croatia. On 23 December 2019, Marjanović was announced as one of the 16 participants in Dora 2020, the national contest in Croatia to select the country's Eurovision Song Contest 2020 entry, with the song "Let's Forgive".

== Discography ==
=== Singles ===
Title	Year	Peak chart positions	Album
Title	Year	CRO	Album
"Vrati mi se ti"	2020	4	Non-album singles
"Let's Forgive"	2020	— (Note: "Let's Forgive" did not enter the HR Top 40, but peaked at number 34 on the regional HR Top 100 (Istra i Primorje) chart.)	Non-album singles
"—" denotes a single that did not chart or was not released.
