= Aklea Neon =

Croatian singer

- Born: Dorotea Zovko; 28 December 1990 (age 35); Osijek, Croatia
- Genre: World music
- Occupations: Singer; songwriter; looping artist
- Instruments: Vocals; guitar; loop
- Years active: 2017–present
- Label: Aquarius Records

Dorotea Zovko (born 28 December 1990), known professionally as Aklea Neon, is a travelling musician from Croatia, one woman band and eco-conscious activist.

== Music career ==
Aklea Neon began her professional career as one of the vocalist in the Osijek-based vocal ensemble Brevis. Aklea's debut single "Da mi je" was released on 21 January 2019 through Aquarius Records. On 23 December 2019, Aklea was announced as one of the 16 participants in Dora 2020, the national contest in Croatia to select the country's Eurovision Song Contest 2020 entry, with the song "Zovi ju mama".

In the final, held on 29 February 2020, she came seventh in the televote and fourth in the jury vote, placing fourth with 23 points. On 17 January 2020, AKlea Neon was nominated for three Rock&Off Awards including Public's Choice and Best New Artist. Through 2020 Aklea released two more singles, "Riba u kadi" and "Shika Shika", from her upcoming debut studio album. On 19 January 2021, Aklea Neon was announced as the winner in the Singer-songwriter of the Year category of Hrvatska radiotelevizija's Music Pub Awards. On 24 February 2022, Aklea released her debut studio album Dođi na joji. "Na dah" was released on the same day as the album's lead single.

== Artistry ==
=== Influences ===
Aklea cites Erykah Badu and Kaya Project as her biggest musical influences. She has also been influenced by folk soul artists like Ibeyi and Fémina.

=== Musical style and songwriting ===
Aklea uses her life experiences she gained from traveling as an inspiration in her work.

== Discography ==
=== Albums ===
| Title | Details |
|---|---|
| Dođi na joji | Released: 24 February 2022; Label: self-released; Formats: digital download |

=== Singles ===
| Title | Year | Peak chart positions | Album |
| Title | Year | CRO | Album |
|---|---|---|---|
| "Pola puta" | 2019 | — | Non-album singles |
| "Da mi je" | 2019 | — | Dođi na joji |
| "What I Want" | 2019 | — | Dođi na joji |
| "Zovi ju mama" | 2020 | — (Note: "Zovi ju mama" did not enter the HR Top 40, but peaked at number 28 on the regional HR Top 100 (Istra i Primorje) chart.) | Dođi na joji |
| "Riba iz kade" | 2020 | — | Non-album singles |
| "Shika Shika" | 2020 | — | Dođi na joji |
| "Ljudnjak" | 2021 | — | Dođi na joji |
| "Na dah" | 2022 | — | Dođi na joji |
"—" denotes a recording that did not chart or was not released in that territory.

== Awards and nominations ==
| Year | Association | Category | Nominee / work | Result | Ref. |
|---|---|---|---|---|---|
| 2020 | Rock&Off Awards | Best New Artist | Aklea Neon | Nominated | |
| 2020 | Rock&Off Awards | Best Electronic Artist | Aklea Neon | Nominated | |
| 2020 | Rock&Off Awards | Public's Choice | Aklea Neon | Nominated | |
| 2021 | Music Pub | Singer-songwriter of the Year | Aklea Neon | Won | |
