= Rabac =

Rabac Porto Albona
- Village
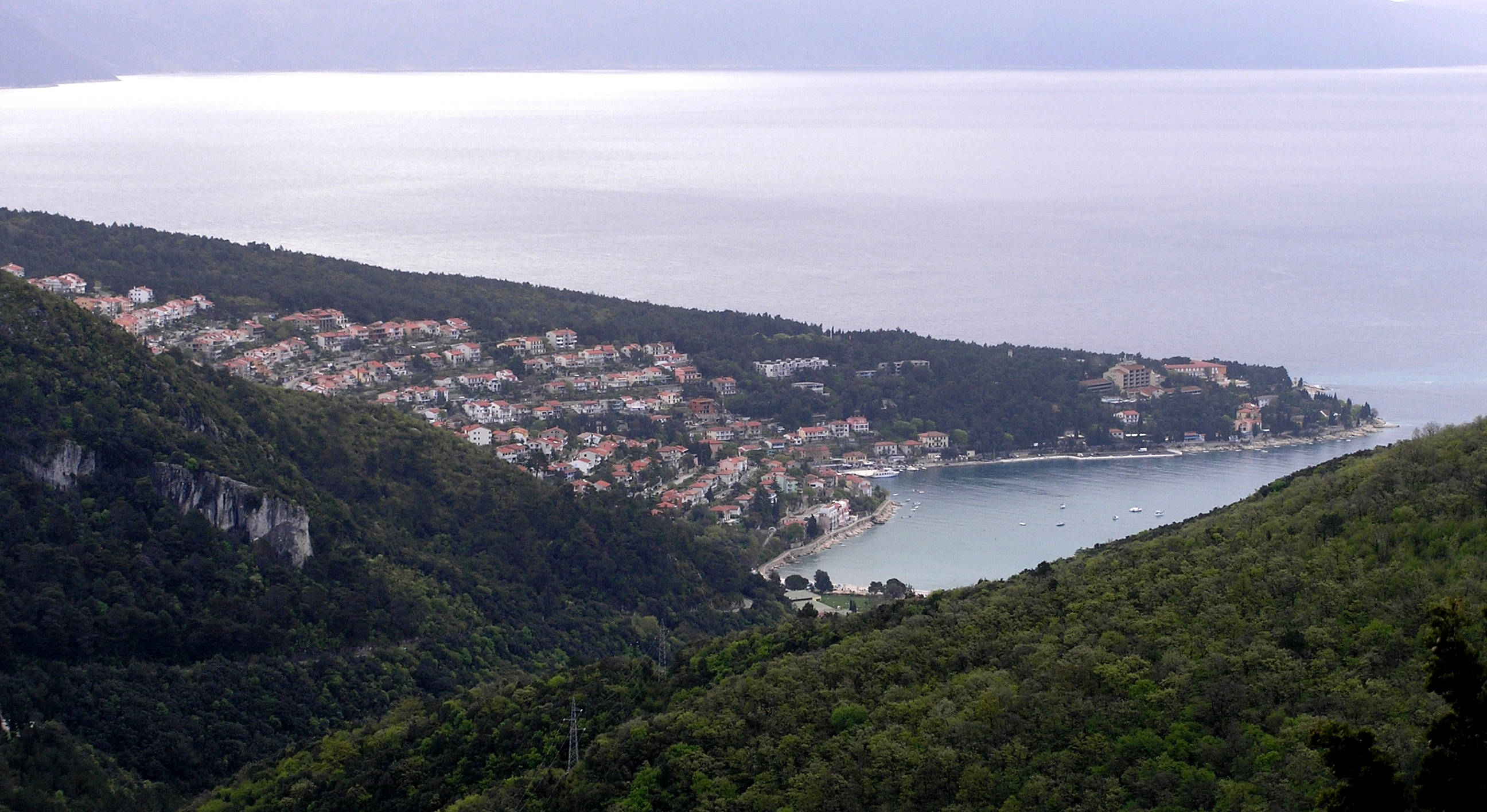
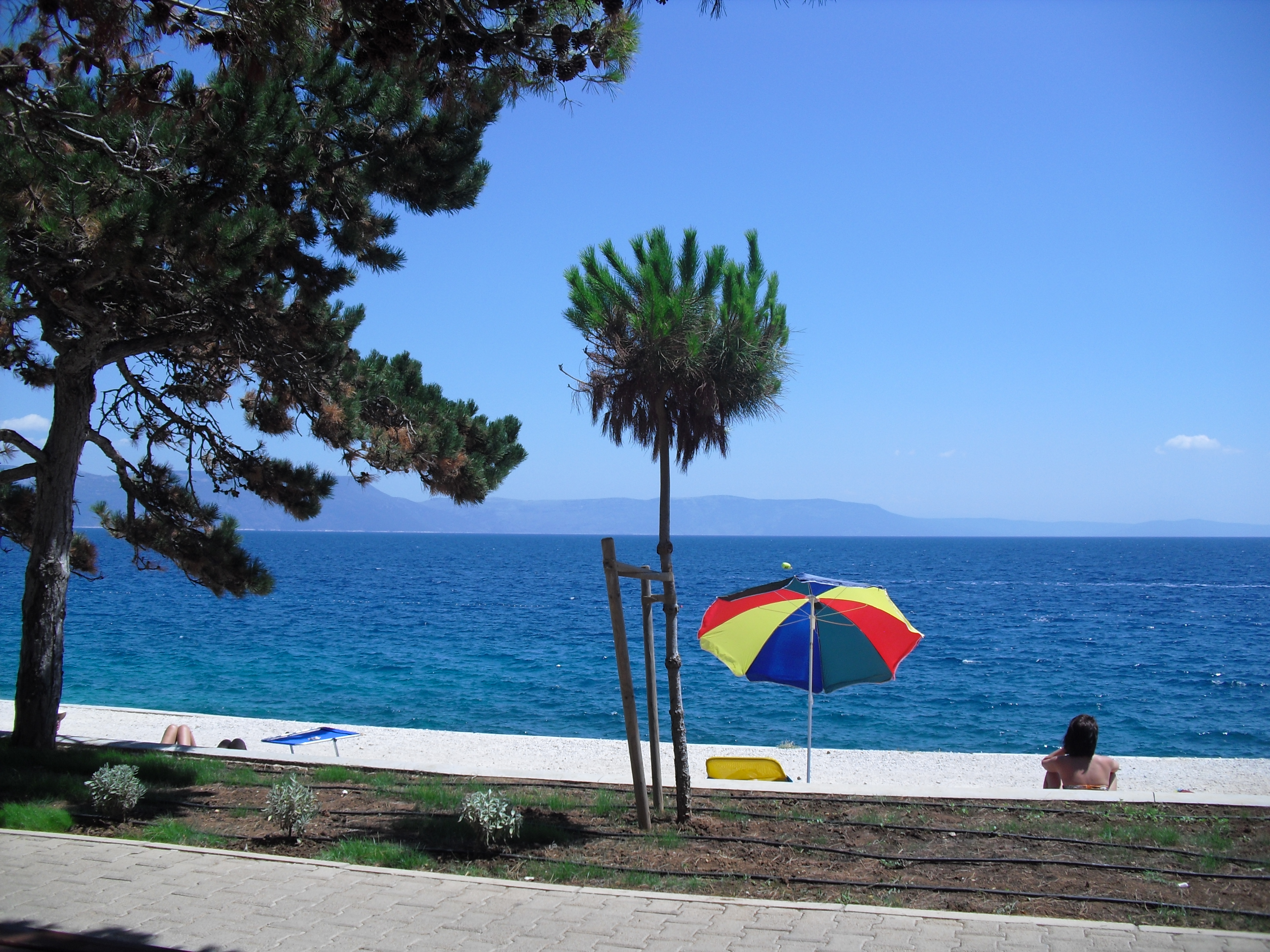
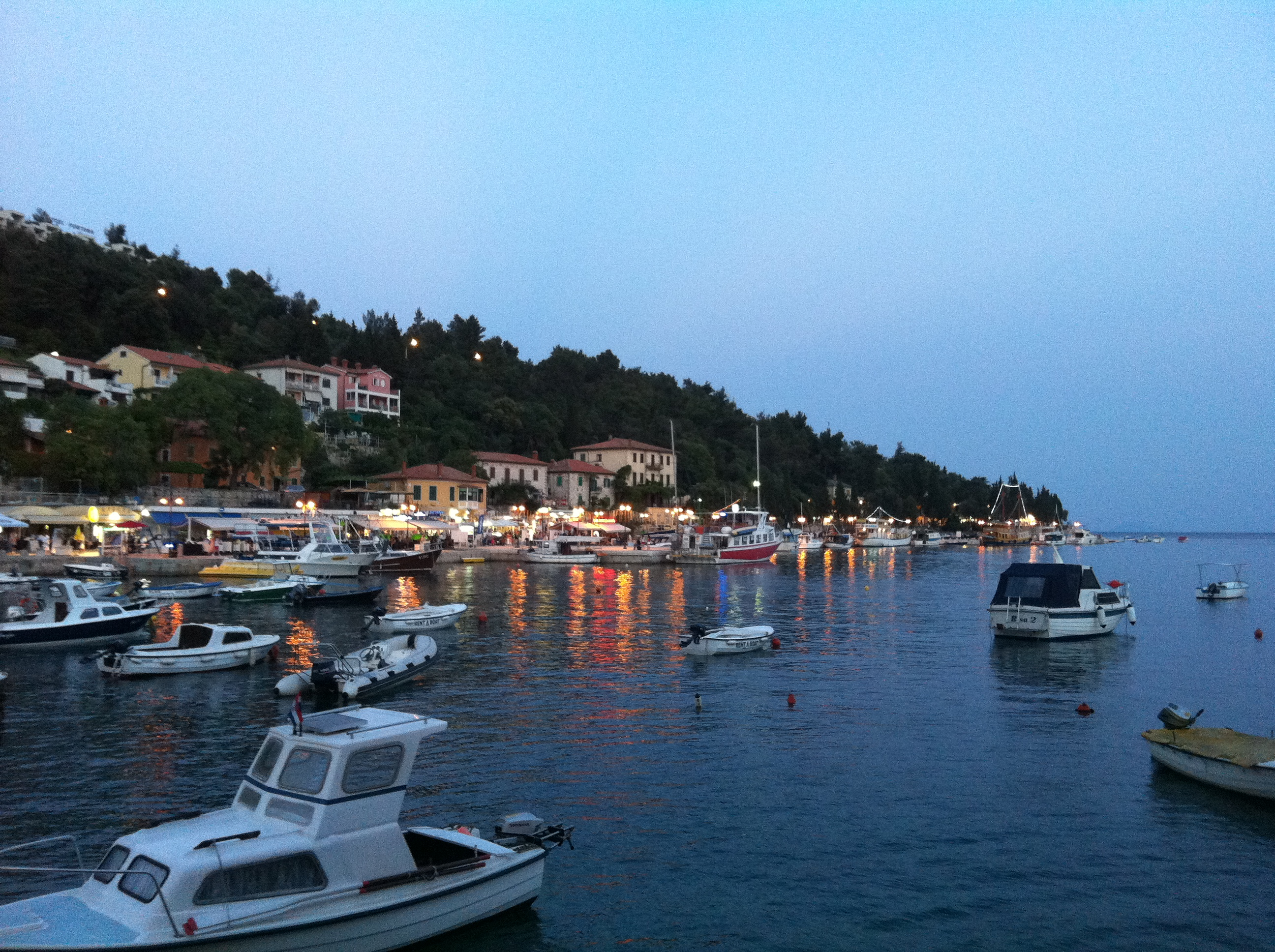
- Rabac

- Location within Croatia
- Coordinates: 45°05′21″N 14°07′11″E
- Country: Croatia
- County: Istria County
- Municipality: Labin

Area
  - Total: 5.3 km^{2} (2.0 sq mi)
- Elevation: 200 m (660 ft)

Population (2021)
  - Total: 1,257
  - Density: 240/km^{2} (610/sq mi)
- Time zone: UTC+1 (CET)
  - Summer (DST): UTC+2 (CEST)
- Postal code: 52220 Labin
- Area code: 52

Rabac (Italian: Porto Albona) is a Croatian resort town on Kvarner Bay, just southeast of Labin, in Istria.

Long a small fishing port, Rabac has grown in the 1970s into a resort town with numerous villas and apartment buildings.

The Rabac Festival is an annual electronic music festival that has been held there for many years; 3,000 people attended in 2002.

== History ==
Up until the end of the 19th century, Rabac was a small fishing village. British explorer Richard Francis Burton visited the village in 1876 and mentioned it his book The Seaboard of Istria. The first summer mansion was built at that time by the Prohaska family but got later destroyed during World War II. The first hotel in Rabac, named Quarnaro, was opened on 11 June 1889.

== Demographics ==
According to the 2021 census, its population was 1,257.

Historical population
Year	Pop.	±%
1880	126	—
1890	195	+54.8%
1900	275	+41.0%
1910	345	+25.5%
1948	346	+0.3%
1953	290	−16.2%
1961	478	+64.8%
1971	737	+54.2%
1981	1,046	+41.9%
1991	1,373	+31.3%
2001	1,472	+7.2%
2011	1,393	−5.4%
2021	1,257	−9.8%

=== Notable people ===
- Franka Batelić, musician, grew up in Rabac.
- Elis Lovrić, musician, grew up in Rabac.

== Tourism ==
Regular music concerts are held at Rabac beach and in the hotels. Magic shows at night are prevalent as are comedians. Tourist expeditions to Venice, Dubrovnik and Krka are common and operate daily at 1 and 3 pm. Fishing tours are also common and cost about 100 kuna.

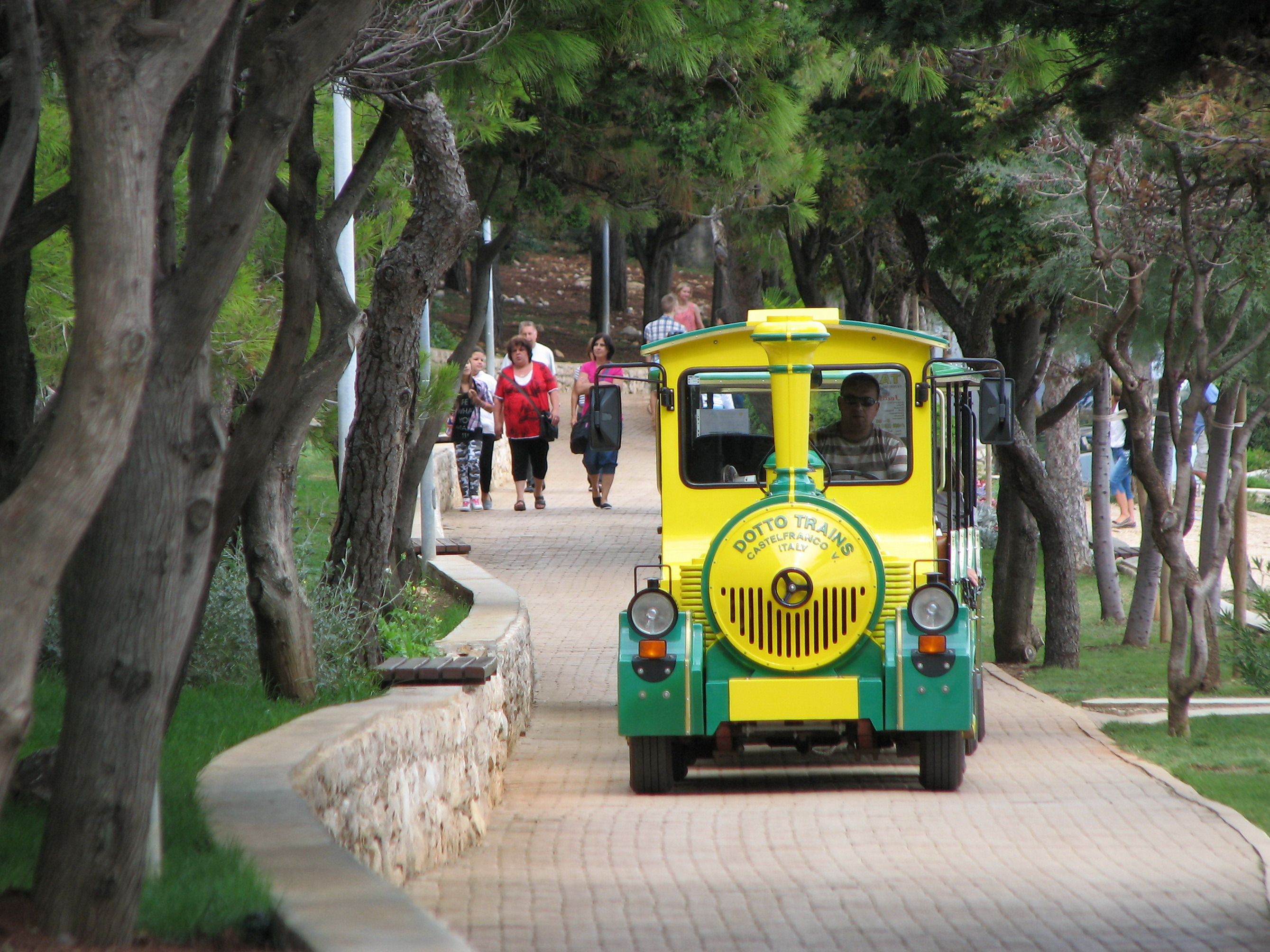
Rabac promenade

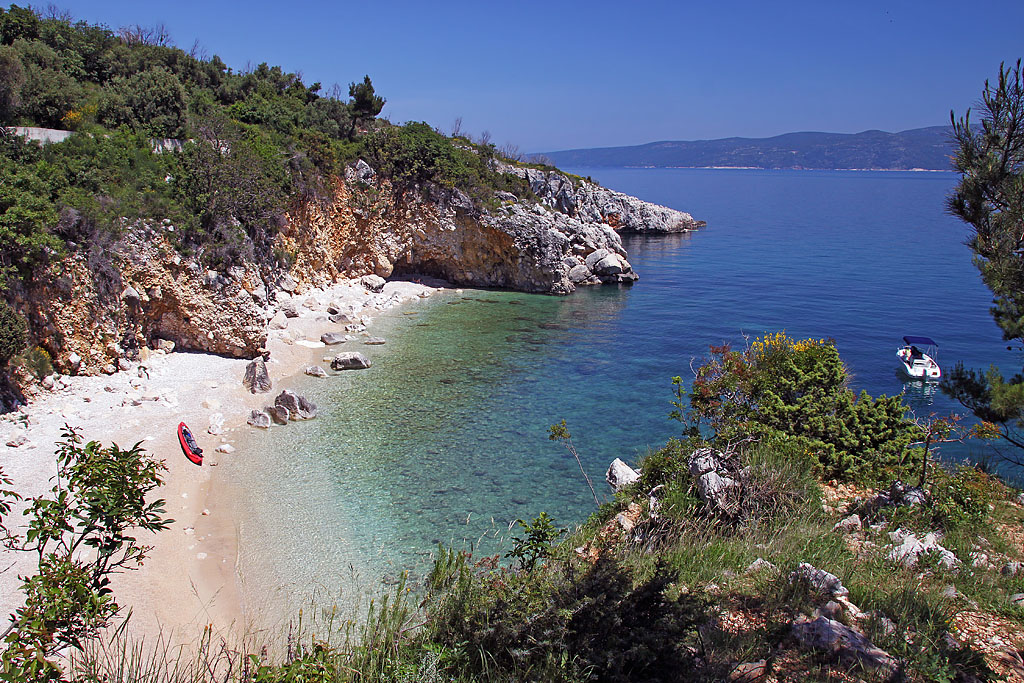
Prižinja cove near Rabac

=== Hotels ===
Three major hotels and a camping site are situated on the first beach. Along the 'Riva' apartments are available for rent. Along the second beach and Girandella countless hotels are situated, of particular note, the locally famous Albona hotel.

== Climate ==
Climate data for Rabac
Month	Jan	Feb	Mar	Apr	May	Jun	Jul	Aug	Sep	Oct	Nov	Dec	Year
Maximum sea temperature °C	14	12	13	16	21	26	26	27	26	22	18	16	20
Minimum sea temperature °C	9	10	10	12	14	19	22	22	20	17	15	12	15
Source: SeaTemperature.org

== Education ==
Although Rabac is better known as a travel and tourism destination, the Matija Vlačić Primary School offers four grades of primary education for the local students. For the higher grades and secondary education students have to travel to the nearby city of Labin.
