= Omega Lithium =

Croatian metal band

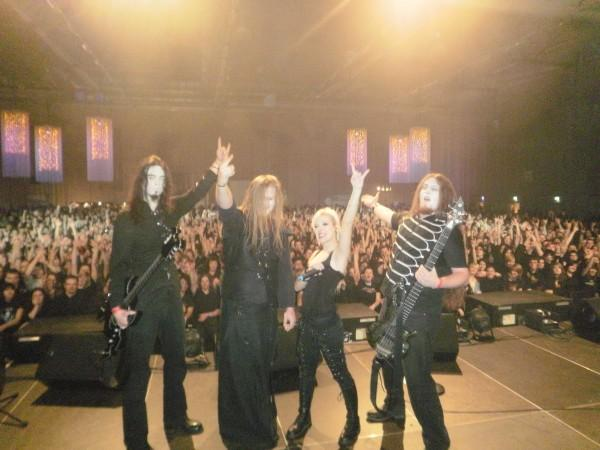

Background information
- Origin: Umag, Croatia
- Genre: Industrial metal
- Years active: 2007–2011
- Labels: Drakkar Entertainment; Sony BMG; Artoffact Records
- Members: Mya Mortensen; Malice Rime; Zoltan Harpax; Torsten Nihill

Omega Lithium was a Croatian industrial metal band active from 2007 to 2011. They were originally signed to Drakkar Entertainment, a part of Sony BMG. The band's debut album, Dreams in Formaline, was released in 2009, and their second (and final) album, Kinetik, was released in 2011.

== Career ==
The first single from the debut album was "Stigmata." The single was played on MTV and peaked at number 4 on the MTV Adria Rock chart, receiving constant airplay for more than 2 months. The video appeared on other European and worldwide TV stations in their daily charts.

On YouTube, "Stigmata" received more than a quarter of a million views, which is the highest viewing number for a debut song in this genre.

The band toured with the German folk metal band Subway to Sally on their Kreuzfeuer tour from 18 to 30 December 2009.

They headlined the 2nd stage on Metal Camp 2010, appeared on Wave Gothic Treffen and concluded the Dreams in Formaline tour with a performance on Metal Female Voices Fest 2010. On 26 February 2010, they announced that a North American version of the debut album Dreams in Formaline would be released by Artoffact Records on 6 April and would include a bonus track.

The band released their second album Kinetik in 2011 via Drakkar Entertainment/Sony Music. It was recorded in Horus Studio in Hannover and was co-produced by the band's guitarist Malice Rime, and produced by Žare Pak. The band disbanded in 2011. Afterwards, Marko Matijević Sekul (Malice Rime) and Zoltan Lečei (Zoltan Harpax) went on to form industrial folk metal band Manntra, while Teodor Klaj (Torsten Nihill) joined Croatian death/thrash metal band Monox.

== Awards ==
Omega Lithium were named "Newcomer of the year 2009" by Zillo (one of Germany's leading alternative music magazines).

They were also named "Newcomer of the year 2009" by Sonic Seducer (another leading German alternative music magazine).

== Lineup ==
=== Final lineup ===
- Mya Mortensen – vocals (2008-2011)
- Malice Rime – guitars, synthesizers, backing vocals (2007-2011)
- Zoltan Harpax – bass, lyrics (2007-2011)
- Torsten Nihill – drums, percussion (2007-2011)

=== Former members ===
- Andrea Zuppani – vocals (2007-2008)

== Discography ==
=== Albums ===
- Dreams in Formaline (2009)
- Kinetik (2011)

=== Singles & EPs ===
- Andromeda (2007)
- Colossus (2011)
- Dance With Me (2011)
