= Manntra =

Croatian metal band

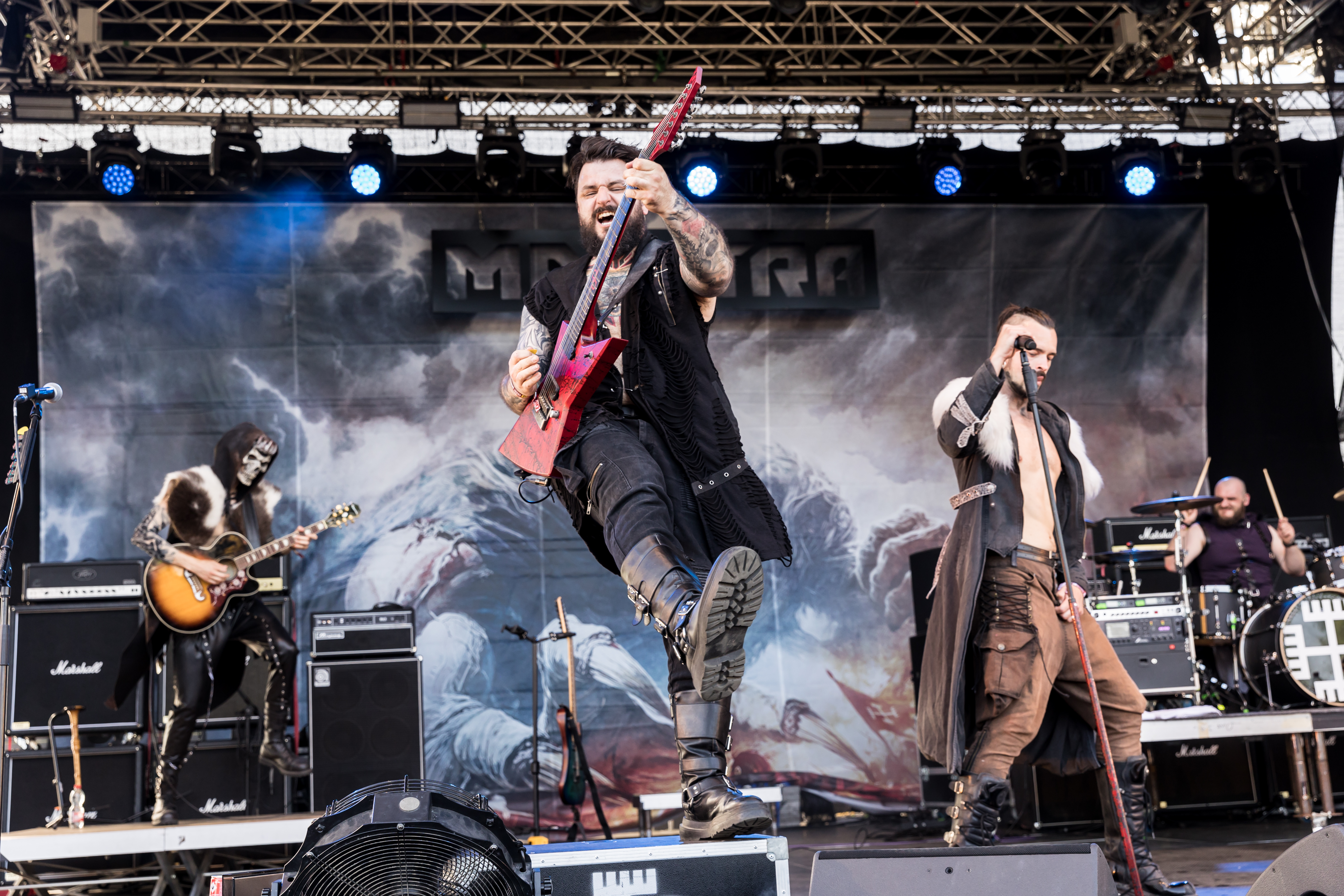
- Manntra in 2025

Background information
- Origin: Umag, Croatia
- Genres: Industrial metal; folk metal; folk rock; alternative rock
- Years active: 2011–present
- Labels: Spona; Croatia; Menart; NoCut; Napalm Records
- Members: Marko Matijević Sekul; Zoltan Lečei; Andrea Kert; Dorian 'Dodo' Pavlović; Barren King
- Website: manntra.hr

Manntra is a Croatian folk metal band from Umag, formed in 2011. After the disbandment of the industrial metal band Omega Lithium, two of its members, Marko Matijević Sekul and Zoltan Lečei, went on to form Manntra, immediately calling Andrea Kert as a drummer, and Marko Purišić as a guitarist.

Manntra's musical style is characterized by a fusion of traditional Croatian folk music with heavy metal, incorporating elements of industrial and electronic music. The band often employs traditional instruments such as the sopele, the tamburica, and the diple, alongside electric guitars, drums, and keyboards. Their music is notable for its dynamic rhythms, driving guitar riffs, and powerful vocals. After releasing the first three EPs in the Croatian language, Manntra pivoted to English (with occasional German lyrics) to embrace a global audience. The band's lyrics frequently deal with themes of spirituality, mythology, and personal struggle, which are often drawn from Croatian folklore and history. Overall, Manntra's sound is a unique blend of different styles, creating a distinct and compelling musical identity.

Beyond the Croatian borders, the band has also gained popularity in Russia, Germany and Austria.

== History ==
=== Demos and early works (2011–2018) ===
The band's debut EP, Horizont, was released on 29 November 2012. It includes the songs "Kiša" and "Horizont," which were previously released as singles. The EP was recorded in 2012 in Croatia and Slovenia and was entirely produced by the band's lead vocalist, Marko Matijević Sekul.

Between 2015 and 2018, Manntra continued to gain momentum with the release of two successful EPs. Venera, released in 2015, showcased the band's evolving sound and incorporated more raw folk instruments. It featured a range of tracks, including "Bijeli Prah," "Vila," and "Put." Its fusion of traditional Balkan folk music and hard rock garnered critical acclaim.

Meridian was released in 2017, building on the success of Venera while pushing the band's sound in new directions. The EP featured a more ambitious and experimental approach aimed closer to home, showcasing the Balkans' soundscape, but finding some success outside Croatia, as well. The track Meridian achieved widespread critical acclaim outside of Croatia.

=== Oyka!, Dora 2019, and Monster Mind Consuming (2019–2021) ===
Manntra decided to expand their focus outside of Croatia with the new Oyka! album. They continued to blend traditional Balkan folk music and heavy metal, but this time exploring it in English. Manntra signed with the record label Menart, which also released their previous EP Meridian in 2017. This deal led to further contracts in Germany and performances at major festivals. Their success opened doors to sign with NoCut Entertainment (SPV) and Schubert Music Agency.

On 17 January 2019, the band was announced as one of the 16 participants in Dora 2019, the Croatian national contest to select the country's Eurovision Song Contest 2019 entry, with the song "In the Shadows," landing in the fourth spot.

During the COVID-19 pandemic, Manntra remained active, collaborating with other artists and experimenting with new material. This period was also marked by the return of the original bass player Zoltan Lečei. Released in 2021, the full-length Monster Mind Consuming showcased a heavier and more complex sound for Manntra. Presented as a conceptual album about war and personal struggle, it featured tracks such as "Heathens," "Ori Ori," and "Monster Mind Consuming." Later that year, Manntra released Nightcall, an three-track EP of covers featuring "No Time to Die," a James Bond theme song by Billie Eilish; "Naranča," a traditional Croatian folk song; and "Nightcall," an industrial cover of a song by French electronic house artist Kavinsky.

=== Kreatura and Endlich! Live in Hamburg (2022) ===
In 2022, Manntra released Kreatura, their third English-language album, via NoCut Entertainment. Kreatura expanded on Manntra's interest in regional folklore and mythical stories and returned slightly to a metal and industrial sound. The release was followed by extensive touring and a festival season, resulting in the release of Endlich! Live in Hamburg, a live EP and video release of Manntra's show in Hamburg.

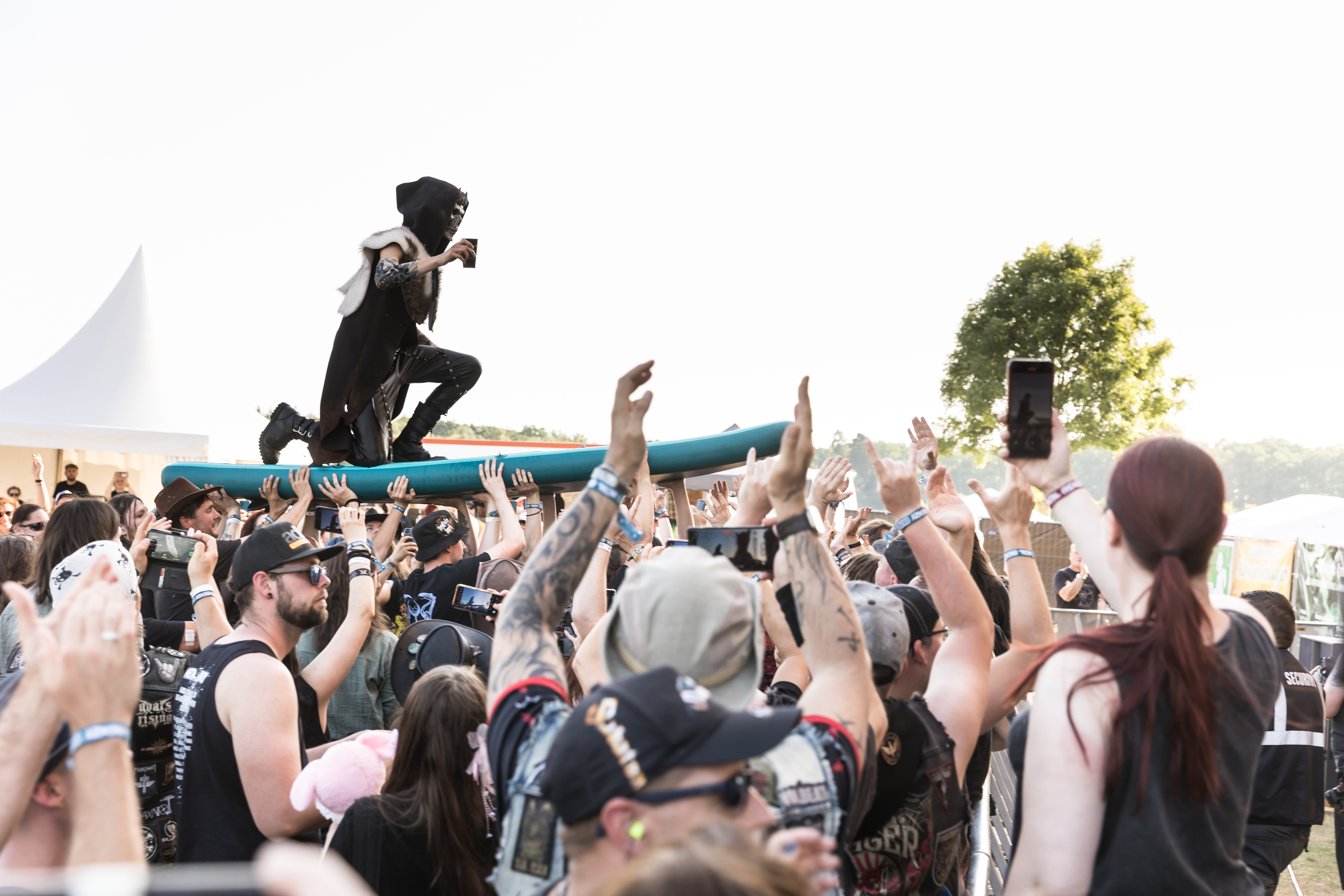
The Barren King surfs the crowd for a beer

Just before their solo tour through Germany, the band got another addition in the form of the masked mystery guitarist/multi-instrumentalist they call the Barren King. Becoming somewhat of a calling card for the band, the Barren King crowd surfs on a stand-up paddleboard during the song of the same name, sometimes picking up a beer from the bar along the way.

=== War of the Heathens (2023) ===
In the summer of 2023, during a year of extensive touring, Manntra released War of the Heathens via NoCut Entertainment. It entered the top 50 bestselling albums on the German charts and reached number 43 after the release, thus becoming the first Croatian band to enter the German Billboard. The album was promoted with a headlining tour in 2024.

=== Titans (2025) ===
Manntra signed with Napalm Records before releasing their next studio album, Titans. The album was released on 14 March 2025. According to the official German charts, Titans peaked the German Albums Chart at number 45 and German Rock/Metal Charts at number 9.

After the release, the band joined German Folk Rockers D'Artagnan on their Herzblut Tour through the year, as well as promoting the album on through the festival season 2025. Headliner Titans Tour followed in 2026. After a spring of touring, the band promoted Titans at the summer music festivals such as Summer Breeze Open Air and Wacken Open Air where they played the headlining slot on Wackinger Stage.

Current confirmed dates are in December when Manntra will join medieval metal band Subway to Sally on their Eisheilige Nacht Tour.

Manntra live at Wacken Open Air 2026

Marko Matijević Sekul

Andrea Kert

Zoltan Lečei

Dorian Pavlović

Barren King

Current

- Marko Matijević Sekul – lead vocals, guitar, keyboards (2011–present)
- Zoltan Lečei – bass guitar (2011–2016, 2021–present)
- Andrea Kert – drums (2011–present)
- Dorian "Dodo" Pavlović – guitar, backing vocals (2022–present)
- Barren King – guitar, pipes, keyboards, mandolin (2022–present)

Former

- Danijel Šćuric – bass guitar (2016)
- Filip Majdak – guitar (2016–2018)
- Boris Kolarić – guitar, bagpipes, mandolin (2016–2021)
- Maja Kolarić – bass guitar (2016–2021)
- Marko "Pure" Purišić – guitar (2011–2016, 2018–2022)

== Discography ==
- Horizont (2012)
- Venera (2015)
- Meridian (2017)
- Oyka! (2019)
- Monster Mind Consuming (2021)
- Nightcall (2021)
- Kreatura (2022)
- Endlich! Live in Hamburg (2022)
- War of the Heathens (2023)
- Titans (2025)

== Other Projects ==
Current and former members of Manntra have been involved in a number of other projects:

| | Bands | Years active | Instruments Played |
|---|---|---|---|
| Marko M. Sekul | Omega Lithium Bastion | Omega Lithium (2007–2011), Bastion (2018) | guitar (all), vocals (Bastion) |
| Dorian Pavlović | Cold Snap, Mass Hypnosis, Monox, Uma Thurman, Gorthaur's Wrath, Omnivore, Ocean of Another | Cold Snap (2016–2022), Ocean of Another (2022–present), others vary | Guitar (all), Vocals (Ocean of Another), Backing Vocals (Monox) |
| Zoltan Lečei | Omega Lithium | Omega Lithium (2007–2011) | bass |
| Barren King (as Zlatko Štefančić) | Zenoth, Ochi, Ocean of Another | Zenoth (2017–present), Ochi (2020–present), Ocean of Another (2022–present) | Guitar (all), Drums (Ochi), Backing Vocals (Zenoth) |
| Marko Purišić | Baby Lasagna | Bastion (2018), Baby Lasagna (2023–present) | vocals |
| Maja Kolarić | EoT | EoT (2021–present) | Bass, Vocals |
| Boris Kolarić | EoT | EoT (2021–present) | Guitar |
| Filip Majdak | Under Nihilo, Tkivo, The Sepia Sisters, Deathpriest, Elephant Stalker, Pale Origins, The Real Thing, Moon, Matt Nolan, The Arcane Club, Yoe Mase | various | various |
| Danijel Šćuric | Petar Punk | Petar Punk (2012) | Guitar |
