= Ocean of Another =

Croatian band

- Genres: Modern Metal, Metalcore
- Instruments: Guitars, Bass, Guitar, Drums, Synthesizers
- Years active: 2022–present
- Label: Beton Music / Menart
- Members: Dorian Pavlović – Vocals; Josip Pilipić – Guitars & Synthesizer; Zlatko Štefančić – Guitars & Synthesizer; Sven Marenković – Bass; Robert Ban Bebek – Drums
- Website: oceanofanother.com

Ocean of Another is a Croatian modern metal/metalcore band founded in 2022 in Rijeka.

== History ==
Founder and vocalist Dorian Pavlović began to draft what would become Ocean of Another's first songs during the COVID-19 pandemic. In the process of a difficult divorce, multiple addictions, and mental health struggles, Pavlović found release in the creative process and his newfound ability to put words to his experiences.

As he shared the new material, Pavlović found that it resonated with friends and fellow musicians Josip Pilipić, Zlatko Štefančić, Sven Marenković, and Robert Ban Bebek, who saw an opportunity to share the experience.

Ocean of Another has so far released five standalone singles and three EPs.

=== Debut Singles and Nove Nade (2022) ===
In their first year, Ocean of Another released three singles. The first, "I Was Never Here," examines the agony of depression and addiction, and the difficulty of being present in the moments that matter. The accompanying video was partially filmed underwater, despite Pavlović's fear of drowning.

"Can I Stay in the Light?" was released the following month. It touches on the internal struggle of someone deciding on the value of his own life, and whether it is worth pushing through past trauma to find light on the other side.

Their third single, an acoustic cover of Slipknot's "Snuff," was a surprise hit for the relatively unknown band, garnering over 1.5 million streams on Spotify and more than 250,000 combined views and streams on YouTube.

In December of that same year, Ocean of Another received the "Nove Nade" (New Hope) award for Best Newcomer from Ri Rock magazine, three months after the release of their first single.

=== Two Singles and One Day This Pain Will Subside (2023–2024) ===
The following year saw the band release two more singles: "I Find it Hard to Feel Alive," which delves into the depths of addiction, and an acoustic version of "I Was Never Here."

The band's first EP was released on March 4, 2024. One Day This Pain Will Subside features five tracks: "Embrace the Darkness," "I Am But a Memory," "Terraform," "Shift + DEL," and "Indigo."

=== Remedy Sessions (2024) ===
Remedy Sessions, released on November 1, 2024, reimagined two tracks from One Day This Pain Will Subside: "Embrace the Darkness" and "Indigo." Each song received two acoustic treatments, one with vocals and one as an instrumental.

=== Loneliness of My Kin (2025) ===
Loneliness of My Kin explores the concepts of personal trauma and heartbreak and into broader themes of climate change and war in the name of systemic greed. The takeaway, according to Pavlović, is: "If you get to know yourself truly and fully, no one can control you through fear."

== Band members ==
The band's lineup is unchanged from its formation, and features:

- Dorian Pavlović – vocals
- Josip Pilipić – guitars, synthesizer
- Zlatko Štefančić – guitars, synthesizer
- Sven Marenković – bass
- Robert Ban Bebek – drums

Ocean of Another is a do-it-yourself band, and the whole group works together to keep the band running. Songwriting is a "joint venture," with recording and video production being kept in-house. Music production is the job of guitarists Zlatko Štefančić and Josip Pilipić, while graphic design and visual production are handled by drummer Robert Ban Bebek. Everyone works together to manage social media, marketing, travel arrangements, merch production, and shipping duties.

== Discography ==
- I Was Never Here – single (2022)
- Can I Stay in the Light? – single (2022)
- Snuff (Acoustic Version) – single (2022)
- I Find it Hard to Feel Alive – single (2023)
- I Was Never Here (Acoustic) – single (2023)
- One Day This Pain Will Subside – EP (2024)
- Remedy Sessions – EP (2024)
- Loneliness of My Kin – EP (2025)

== Other Projects ==
Members of Ocean of Another have been involved in a number of other projects:

	Bands	Years active	Instruments Played
Dorian Pavlović	Cold Snap, Manntra, Mass Hypnosis, Monox, Uma Thurman, Gorthaur's Wrath, Omnivore	Cold Snap (2016–2022), Manntra (2022–present), others vary	Guitar (all), Backing Vocals (Monox, Manntra)
Josip Pilipić	Pale Origins, Bravement, High Kick Drive By, Hysteria, Polarity of Life	Pale Origins (2015–present), others vary	Guitar
Zlatko Štefančić	Manntra, Zenoth, Ochi	Manntra (2022–present), Zenoth (2017–present), Ochi (2020–present)	Guitar (all), Mandolin & Pipes (Manntra), Drums (Ochi), Backing Vocals (Zenoth)
Sven Marenković	Grapevine Babies, Neglected	Grapevine Babies (2015–present)	Bass
Robert Ban Bebek	Cold Snap, Katran, Violate, Ashes of Eternity, Inside My Casket, Violate, Mass Hypnosis	Cold Snap (2019–2022), others vary	Drums
