= Marko Matijević Sekul =

Croatian musician (born 1987)

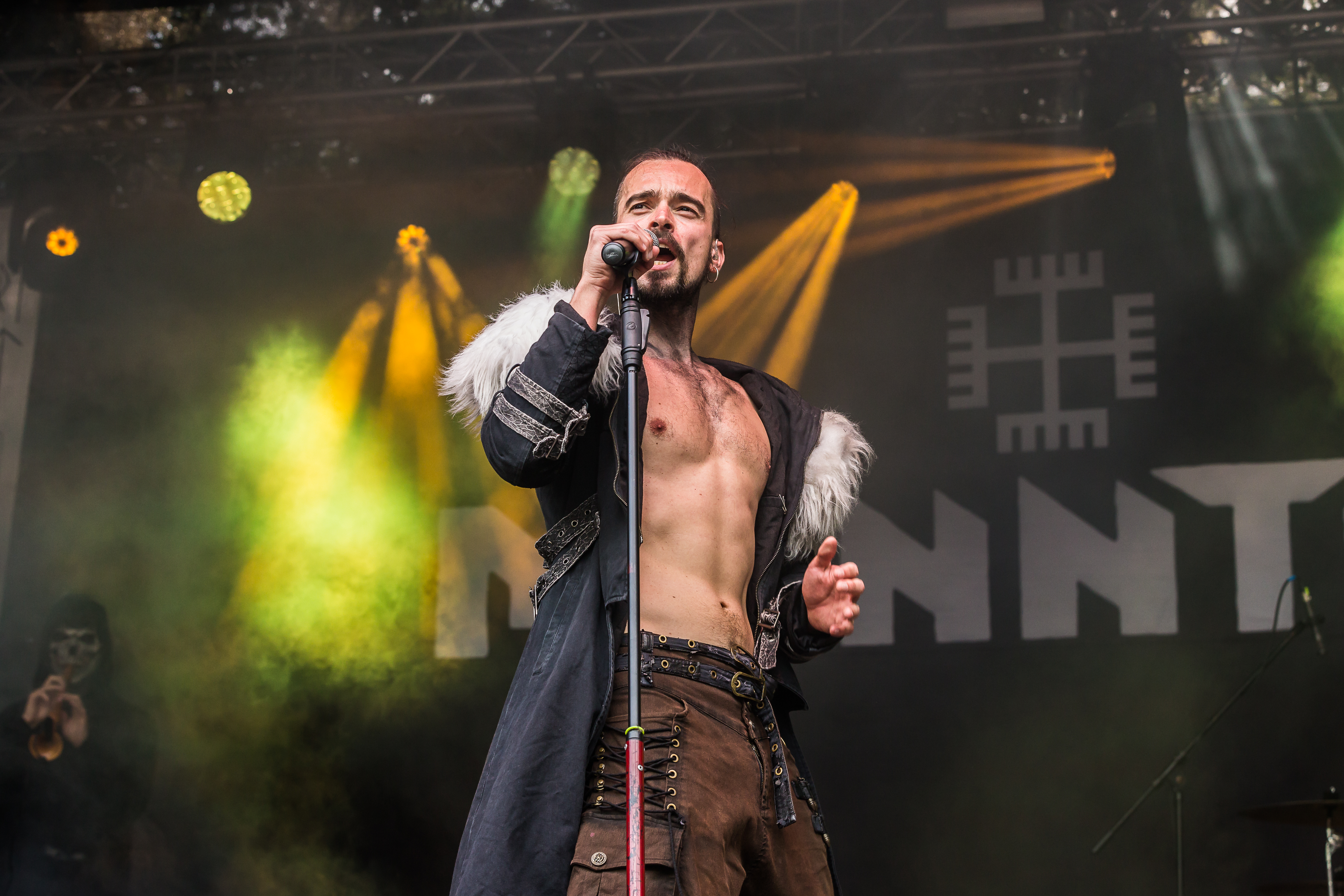
- Sekul in 2023

Background information
- Born: February 20, 1987 (age 39); Ljubljana, Slovenia
- Genres: Folk Metal • Industrial Metal
- Occupation: Musician • Songwriter • Producer • Audio Engineer
- Instrument: Vocals • Guitar • Pipes • Synthesizer • Keyboard
- Years active: 2007–present
- Label: Napalm Records • NoCut • Menart • Croatia • Spona • Drakkar • Sony Music Germany
- Member of: Manntra
- Formerly of: Omega Lithium, Bastion
- Website: www.manntra.hr

Marko Matijević Sekul (born 20 February 1987) is a Croatian musician, songwriter, and music producer. Though he is best known as the vocalist for the Croatian folk metal band Manntra, Sekul has been involved in a number of music projects both on stage and behind the scenes, winning several awards in the process.

== Early life ==
Marko Matijević Sekul was born in Ljubljana, Slovenia, and grew up in Umag, Croatia. As a child, he had no interest in music until his brother gave him a copy of Depeche Mode's Ultra. His interest piqued, Sekul began hanging around the underground music scene in the Umag area, listening to rehearsals.

Music was not his first choice as a profession, however. He initially pursued a career in professional football (soccer). That career was cut short by a broken leg in 2003, which was when he began playing guitar.

== Education ==
Sekul completed his primary education in the Italian language. After, he trained in the direction of management and company administrations at the Secondary School of Economics, in the Croatian language. He then studied audio engineering at the SAE Institute in Ljubljana in the English language.

== Career ==
=== Musician ===
Sekul (as Malice Rime) was a founding member and guitarist of industrial metal band Omega Lithium in 2007. Upon hearing their demo, Drakkar Records / Sony Music Germany quickly signed the band and offered a European tour with Subway to Sally. Sekul composed all of the music on the band's two albums: Dreams in Formaline (2009) and Kinetik (2011). Omega Lithium's debut single, "Stigmata," received widespread airplay in Croatia and around Europe, peaking at Number 4 on MTV, and the band was named "Newcomer of the Year" by several notable magazines, including Zillo and Sonic Seducer.

After its disbandment in 2011, Sekul and former Omega Lithium bandmate Zoltan Lečei formed Manntra, with Sekul as both frontman and guitarist, Lečei on bass, and Andrea Kert on drums. After the release of their first EP, the band's manager gave a copy to In Extremo frontman Michael Robert (Micha) Rhein. A year later, Rhein called Sekul and invited Manntra to perform at In Extremo's 20-year anniversary concert at the Loreley Amphitheatre in Germany.

Manntra has released four studio EPs: Horizont (2012), Venera (2015), Meridian (2017), and Nightcall (2021), as well as five full-length studio albums: Oyka! (2019), Monster Mind Consuming (2021), Kreatura (2022), War of the Heathens (2023), and Titans (2025) — with the latter two albums both landing in the top 50 on the German charts. All were produced, recorded, and mixed by Sekul. In addition, the live EP/video Endlich! Live in Hamburg was released in 2022, and the live album Live in Leipzig in 2024.

Sekul and Manntra have participated in several national and international events. In 2019, Manntra was selected to be part of Dora, the Croatian national selection for the Eurovision Song Contest, where they placed fourth. Two years later, Manntra won the annual "International" competition held by Hrvatsko društvo skladatelja (HDS), the Croatian Composers' Society — the first metal band to win the competition. In 2022, Manntra was invited to perform at Wacken Open Air, one of the largest and best-known heavy metal festivals in the world. Also in 2022, Sekul served as a member of the Dora jury for the City of Pula, representing HDS.

=== Production ===
In addition to his work with Manntra, Sekul is a full-time music producer. His first production experiences involved recording original songs in studios around Europe, including a lengthy stint in Hanover at Horus Sound Studio, where he also produced many of Omega Lithium's songs.

In 2015, Sekul started his own studio, Beton Music Agency / Beton Music Studio in Zagreb. He has worked with a number of artists, including Tabu, Nina Kraljić, Big Foot Mama, heavy metal a cappella group Metaklapa, and Marin Jurić-Čivro — the latter of which earned Sekul the award for "Best Arrangement" at the 2017 Split Pop Music Festival for the song "Još Uvijek."

=== Composition ===
Sekul has written and produced music for several commercials, including the Croatian lottery. He also created the sound matrix for Bela, an embedded platform for audio and sensor processing.

== Other projects ==
Additional works by Sekul include Bastion, a project formed in 2018 with friend and former bandmate Marko Purišić (now known as Baby Lasagna), and guest vocals on The Trigger's Vreme Čuda. He has also appeared (with Manntra) on albums by Subway to Sally and Harpyie, and on the 2023 compilation A Tribute to Rammstein.
