= Leo Mujić =

Croatian ballet choreographer (born 1975)

Leo Mujić (born 6 September 1975) is a Serbian-born Croatian ballet dancer, teacher, and choreographer known for his contemporary style which blends modern and classical ballet. He has choreographed for ballet companies around the world, including the American Ballet Theater in New York City and the Paris Opera Ballet. He has won several Croatian Theatre Awards for his choreography and directing.

== Biography ==
=== Early life and education ===
Mujić was born 6 September 1975 in Belgrade, SR Serbia, SFR Yugoslavia to Croatian parents from Dalmatia. He graduated from the Lujo Davičo Ballet School in Belgrade under instructor Bora Talevski. He then trained at the École-Atelier Rudra Béjart in Lausanne, Switzerland.

=== Career ===
In 2008, Mujić made his directorial debut at the Croatian National Theatre in Zagreb with his original ballet Idi, vidi, set to the music of Johann Sebastian Bach. Continuing his work in Zagreb, in 2010, he choreographed and directed the ballet Tišina mog šuma, inspired by the poetry of Croatian writer Dobriša Cesarić; it featured music by Croatian composer Anita Andreis interwoven with works by Wolfgang Amadeus Mozart, Tomaso Antonio Vitali, Claude Debussy, and Franz Schubert. In 2014, Mujić premiered Anna Karenina in Zagreb, based on the 1878 novel by Leo Tolstoy, in collaboration with Croatian choreographer Valentina Turcu. In 2017, he choreographed and directed the neoclassical ballet The Glembays, based on Miroslav Krleža's play Mssrs. Glembay; Mujić wrote the libretto himself for what he considers to be "one of the most significant Croatian dramas". For both Anna Karenina and The Glemabys, Mujić was awarded the Croatian Theatre Award for best choreography.

In 2014, Mujić collaborated with Valentina Turcu again to stage Prokofiev's Romeo and Juliet at the Latvian National Ballet in Riga. In 2016, he directed and choreographed Scheherazade and Her Tales in Riga to music by Nikolai Rimsky-Korsakov and Zoltán Kodály.

In 2019, Mujić premiered his ballet The Great Gatsby, inspired F. Scott Fitzgerald's 1925 novel, at the Ljubljana Ballet. He later adapted the ballet for the National Opera and Ballet of Bulgaria in Sofia, which premiered in 2024.

In 2019, Mujić was chosen to choreograph the performance for Croatia's entry in the Eurovision Song Contest, "The Dream" by Roko Blažević.

In 2023, Mujić choreographed Bizet's Carmen for the Teatro Massimo in Palermo to music arranged by Rodion Shchedrin. The show returned the following year as well.

Mujić returned to the Croatian National Theatre in Zagreb in 2023 with Hamlet, inspired by William Shakespeare's tragedy. In 2025, he was awarded the Croatian Theatre Award for the best choreographer or director in ballet for Hamlet; the ballet itself received the award for the best overall performance of the year. Mujić will stage Hamlet at the Queensland Ballet in Brisbane in 2026.
