= Gdje Dunav ljubi nebo =

Song by Josipa Lisac

Song by Josipa Lisac

from the album Boginja
- Released: 1987
- Recorded: February 1987
- Genre: pop
- Label: Jugoton
- Songwriter: Alka Vuica

"Gdje Dunav ljubi nebo" (Where Danube kisses the sky) is a song by Josipa Lisac. Originally performed at Yugoslav selection for Eurovision Song Contest 1987. Although the song lost to Novi fosili's Ja sam za ples, the song became a huge hit.

== Composition ==
Music was composed by Krešimir Klemenčić and lyrics were written by Alka Vuica. Programmers on this song were Klemenčić and Stanko Juzbašić.
