= The Dream (Roko Blažević song) =

2019 song performed by Roko Blažević

Single by Roko Blažević
- Released: 17 February 2019
- Recorded: 2018
- Length: 3:00
- Label: Croatia
- Songwriters: Jacques Houdek; Andrea Čubrić; Charlie Mason
- Producers: Filip Gjud; Ivan Škunca

Roko Blažević singles chronology
"Podsjećaš na ljubav" (2018)	"The Dream" (2019)	"Krila" (2019)

Music video
- "The Dream" on YouTube

Eurovision Song Contest 2019 entry
- Country: Croatia
- Artist: Roko Blažević
- Languages: English, Croatian
- Composer: Jacques Houdek
- Lyricists: Jacques Houdek; Andrea Čubrić; Charlie Mason

Finals performance
- Semi-final result: 14th
- Semi-final points: 64
- Final result: Did not qualify

Entry chronology
- ◄ "Crazy" (2018)
- "Divlji Vjetre" (2020) ►

"The Dream" is a song performed by Croatian singer Roko Blažević and written by Jacques Houdek, Andrea Čubrić and Charlie Mason. The song represented Croatia in the Eurovision Song Contest 2019 in Tel Aviv, Israel. A Croatian language version of the song, titled "Heroj" (English: Hero), was released on 18 February 2019. The song was performed during the second semi-final on 16 May 2019, but did not quality for the final.

== Background ==
"As an artist I gave it my all with the performance in Kiev, for now it should stay this way. I'm looking forward to Dora 2019. I already wrote the song and I have the perfect artist for it. It will be a perfect match for Eurovision, the creative concept will be made by my team, the same team who did my "My Friend" performance."

—Houdek, Jutarnji list

Prior to the opening of the submission period Jacques Houdek started teasing the song. On 20 November 2018, the Croatian national broadcaster HRT opened the song submission period for composers to send their entries for Dora 2019 until 15 January 2019. On 11 January, Houdek revealed in an interview with Slobodna Dalmacija that Roko Blažević would perform the song "The Dream". Houdek and Blažević previously collaborated in the second season of the singing competition Zvijezde where Blažević finished as runner-up. "The Dream" was released for digital download as a single through Croatia Records on 17 February 2019. It was written by Jacques Houdek, Andrea Čubrić and Charlie Mason, while music was composed by Houdek.

== Eurovision Song Contest ==
On 17 January 2019, Roko Blažević was confirmed as one of the 16 participants in Dora 2019 with the song "The Dream". On 6 February 2019, the running order was revealed by HRT and Blažević was assigned to the eleventh slot. He won the national final on 16 February with a combined total of 24 points and represented Croatia in the Eurovision Song Contest 2019 in Tel Aviv, Israel. The song was performed during the second semi-final on 16 May 2019, but did not quality for the final. Leo Mujić choreographed the performance.

== Commercial performance ==
"The Dream" debuted at number one on the Croatian HR Top 40 chart, marking Blažević's first appearance on the chart.

== Music video ==
The music video was released on 11 April 2019 via Eurovision Song Contest's YouTube channel.

== Track listing ==
Digital download
No.	Title	Length
1.	"The Dream"	3:00
2.	"Heroj"	3:00

== Charts ==
Chart (2019)	Peak position
Croatia (HR Top 40)	1

== Release history ==
Region	Date	Format	Label	Ref.
Various	17 February 2019	Digital download; streaming	Croatia	
