= Elis Lovrić =

- Born: Pula, SR Croatia, SFR Yugoslavia
- Origin: Rabac, Croatia
- Genres: Contemporary folk
- Occupations: Singer; actress
- Instruments: Vocals; guitar; piano
- Years active: 1995–present
- Label: Akcent Studio
- Website: elislovric.com

Elis Lovrić is a Croatian contemporary folk singer-songwriter and actress. In early 2017 she released her third studio album, Merika.

Most of her songs are written in Labinjonska čakavica, a subdialect of the Chakavian dialect, i.e. Northern Chakavian dialect spoken in eastern Istria around the town of Labin.

== Early life ==
Lovrić was born in Pula, and grew up in Rabac, in the Yugoslav republic of Croatia.

== Career ==
=== 2017–2019: Merika and Dora 2019 ===
Titled Merika, Lovrić's third album is a contemporary folk record containing Istrian scale songs and ballads. The album was released on 13 May 2017, by Akcent Studio. The Portuguese-language version of the album, titled O canto da Istria, was released in September 2018.

In late 2017, Lovrić started working on her fourth studio album. Her song "Sretno ti bilo" was released in June 2018 and was later performed at the 58th Split Festival. On 17 January 2019, Lovrić was announced as one of the 16 participants in Dora 2019, the national contest in Croatia to select the country's Eurovision Song Contest 2019 entry, with the song "All I Really Want". She finished the competition as seventh with a total of eight points. On 25 January 2019, HIA reported that Lovrić's fourth studio album would be released during the second quarter of 2020.

=== 2020–present: Zagreb Festival and Dora 2020 & 2022 ===
On 21 November 2019 it was announced that Lovrić will compete at the 67th edition of the Zagreb Festival with the song "Vidim da si tu". On 23 December 2019, Lovrić was announced as one of the 16 participants in Dora 2020, the national contest in Croatia to select the country's Eurovision Song Contest 2020 entry, with the song "Jušto". She finished the competition as 13th with a total of twelve points. On 17 December 2021, Lovrić was announced as one of the acts to perform at Dora 2022 with the song "No War". In an interview Elis explained that the song promotes a message that is against war, and spreads empathy and strength to individuals who are standing alone against the senselessness of war.

== Discography ==
=== Studio albums ===
- Simple Girl (1995)
- My Land (2007)
- Merika / O canto da Istria (2017)
- Kanat od mora (2021)

=== Singles ===
Title	Year	Peak chart positions	Album
Title	Year	CRO	Album
"Merika"	2017	—	Merika
"Sretno ti bilo"	2018	—	Kanat od mora
"All I Really Want"	2019	— (Note: "All I Really Want" did not enter the HR Top 40, but peaked at number 27 on the regional HR Top 100 (Istra i Primorje) chart.)	Non-album singles
"Od kad te poznon"	2019	— (Note: "Od kad te poznon" did not enter the HR Top 40, but peaked at number 50 on the regional HR Top 100 (Istra i Primorje) chart.)	Kanat od mora
"Vidim da si tu"	2020	—	Non-album singles
"Jušto"	2020	— (Note: "Jušto" did not enter the HR Top 40, but peaked at number 58 on the regional HR Top 100 (Istra i Primorje) chart.)	Non-album singles
"Je ča je"	2020	—	Kanat od mora
"Se ti vol"	2020	—	Non-album singles
"Kova je naša"	2021	—	Kanat od mora
"Brodolom"	2021	—	Non-album singles
"No War"	2022	—	Non-album singles
"—" denotes a recording that did not chart or was not released in that territory.

== Filmography ==
Films starred

- Ovdje nema nesretnih turista (1988)
- Jerusalemski sindrom (2004)

== Awards and nominations ==
Year	Association	Category	Nominee / work	Result	Ref.
2018	Istriana Award	Singer of the Year	Elis Lovrić	Won	
2019	Music Pub	Singer-songwriter of the Year	Elis Lovrić	Won	
