= Gianna Apostolski =

Croatian television personality (born 1977)

- Born: August 26, 1977 (age 49); Split, SR Croatia, SFR Yugoslavia
- Occupations: Television personality; business owner
- Years active: 2000s–present
- Known for: Presenter on Red Carpet; Contestant on Farma (Season 2); Panelist on Tko to tamo pjeva?

Gianna Apostolski (born 26 August 1977) is a Croatian television personality and business owner. She appeared in Croatian media during the late 2000s on the Nova TV entertainment show Red Carpet and the reality competition series Farma. She later founded an event and concierge agency in Split and returned to television in 2024 as a panelist on the music game show Tko to tamo pjeva?.

== Early life ==
Apostolski was born Danica Apostolski on 26 August 1977 in Split, SR Croatia, SFR Yugoslavia. She was named after her paternal grandmother, later choosing to legally change her first name to Gianna in early adulthood. Her father, Đorđe Apostolski was a recording musician who released multiple LP records. At age seven, Apostolski joined the Split children's choir "Srdelice," led by composer and conductor Jovica Škaro, and subsequently performed with the cultural society KUD "Mozaik". She completed vocal training and competed in youth talent contests, including Prvi pljesak. In 1995, at the age of 18, she gave birth to her son and reportedly focused on single motherhood for the following decade. She returned to the performing arts in 2005 as the frontwoman of the female vocal pop group "Coyote," touring nationally and performing at regional events such as the Mostar Music Festival and the Marco Polo Festival before exiting the group in 2007.

== Career ==
Apostolski attained national visibility in 2008 when she joined commercial network Nova TV to present the a news segment of the weekly Sunday night showbiz magazine Red Carpet.

In March 2009, Apostolski entered the second season of Nova TV's reality television franchise Farma as a celebrity challenger alongside rock musician Jurica Pađen and model Boris Jelinić. Apostolski also made guest acting appearances in domestic television series, including Urota and Zabranjena ljubav, starred in the music video for rock group Aerodrom's single "Kći starog vodeničara," and appeared on the cover of the Croatian edition of Playboy in 2011.

Fifteen years after her departure from regular network programming, Apostolski returned to television on 15 March 2024 as a permanent celebrity detective and panelist on Nova TV's primetime musical game show Tko to tamo pjeva?, adapted from the international South Korean format I Can See Your Voice. Serving on the expert panel alongside singer-songwriters Alka Vuica and Luka Nižetić and stand-up comedian Goran Vinčić. Following critical reception and ratings success of the show, Nova TV renewed the format, retaining Apostolski on the permanent panel for its subsequent seasons.

In 2024, Apostolski appeared as a guest taster on Nova TV's culinary series MasterChef Hrvatska alongside her fellow Tko to tamo pjeva? panelists.
