= Croatia in the Eurovision Song Contest 2019 =

- Eurovision Song Contest 2019
- Country: Croatia
- Selection process: Dora 2019
- Selection date: 16 February 2019

Competing entry
- Song: "The Dream"
- Artist: Roko
- Songwriters: Jacques Houdek; Andrea Čubrić; Charlie Mason

Placement
- Semi-final result: Failed to qualify (14th)

Participation chronology

Croatia was represented at the Eurovision Song Contest 2019 with the song "The Dream" written by Jacques Houdek, Andrea Čubrić and Charlie Mason. The song was performed by Roko. Songwriter Jacques Houdek represented Croatia in the Eurovision Song Contest 2017 with the song "My Friend" where he placed thirteenth in the grand final of the competition. The Croatian broadcaster Croatian Radiotelevision (HRT) organised the national final Dora 2019 to select the Croatian entry for the 2019 contest in Tel Aviv, Israel. Sixteen entries competed in the national final on 16 February 2019 and "The Dream" performed by Roko was selected as the winner following the combination of votes from ten regional juries and a public televote.

Croatia was drawn to compete in the second semi-final of the Eurovision Song Contest which took place on 16 May 2019. Performing during the show in position 10, "The Dream" was not announced among the top 10 entries of the second semi-final and therefore did not qualify to compete in the final. It was later revealed that Croatia placed fourteenth out of the 18 participating countries in the semi-final with 64 points.

== Background ==
Prior to the 2019 contest, Croatia had participated in the Eurovision Song Contest twenty-four times since its first entry in 1993. The nation's best result in the contest was fourth, which it achieved on two occasions: in 1996 with the song "Sveta ljubav" performed by Maja Blagdan and in 1999 with the song "Marija Magdalena" performed by Doris Dragović. Following the introduction of semi-finals in 2004, Croatia had thus far featured in seven finals. Since 2018, the Croatian entries failed to qualify from the semi-finals; the last time Croatia competed in the final was in 2017 with the song "My Friend" performed by Jacques Houdek. In 2018, Croatia failed to qualify to the final with Franka and the song "Crazy".

The Croatian national broadcaster, Croatian Radiotelevision (HRT), broadcasts the event within Croatia and organises the selection process for the nation's entry. HRT confirmed Croatia's participation in the 2019 Eurovision Song Contest on 26 September 2018. Between 1993 and 2011, HRT organised the national final Dora in order to select the Croatian entry for the Eurovision Song Contest. In 2012 and 2013, the broadcaster opted to internally select the entry. The Croatian broadcaster continued the internal selection procedure since 2016 after missing the contest in 2014 and 2015, however, HRT announced on 2 October 2018 that Dora would return to select Croatia's entry at the 2019 contest.

== Before Eurovision ==
=== Dora 2019 ===
Dora 2019 was the twentieth edition of the Croatian national selection Dora which selected Croatia's entry for the Eurovision Song Contest 2019. The competition consisted of sixteen entries competing in one final on 16 February 2019 at the Marino Cvetković Sports Hall in Opatija, hosted by Mirko Fodor, Jelena Glišić and Iva Šulentić. The show was broadcast on HRT 1 as well as online via the broadcaster's streaming service HRTi. The national final was watched by 543,912 viewers in Croatia with a market share of 32%.

==== Competing entries ====
On 20 November 2018, HRT opened a submission period where artists and composers were able to submit their entries to the broadcaster with the deadline on 10 January 2019. Songs submitted were required to be in English, French, Italian or Croatian. 162 entries were received by the broadcaster during the submission period. A seven-member expert committee consisting of Ivana Vrdoljak Vanna (singer), Zlatko Turkalj Turki (radio host), Igor Geržina (producer of HRT's Jazz Orchestra), Ante Pecotić (composer and producer), Antonija Šola (singer, actress and composer), Zlatko Gal (music critic) and Željen Klašterka (Head of the Croatian Eurovision Delegation) reviewed the received submissions and selected sixteen artists and songs for the competition. HRT announced the competing entries on 23 December 2018 and among the artists were Neda Parmac of Gelato Sisters who represented Bosnia and Herzegovina in the Eurovision Song Contest 2005 and Croatia in the Eurovision Song Contest 2010 as a member of Feminnem, and Marko Škugor of 4 Tenora who represented Croatia in the Eurovision Song Contest 2013 as a member of Klapa s Mora. On 29 January 2019, 4 Tenora withdrew their song "Brod bez imena", written by Eduard Botrić and Matko Šimac, due to a previously scheduled concert and replaced with "Nisam to što žele" performed by Kim Verson. The running order of the final was determined by HRT and announced on 4 February 2019.

Artist	Song	Songwriter(s)
Beta Sudar	"Don't Give Up"	Predrag Martinjak, Malin Johansson
Bernarda	"I Believe in True Love"	Duško Rapotec Ute, Bernarda Brunović, Tatjana Bon
Bojan Jambrošić and Danijela Pintarić	"Vrijeme predaje"	Ante Toni Eterović, Leonardo Čeči Baksa
Domenica	"Indigo"	Tonči Huljić, Vjekoslava Huljić
Elis Lovrić	"All I Really Want"	Elis Lovrić, Olja Dešić
Ema Gagro	"Redemption"	Andreas Björkman, Adriana Pupavac, Kalle Persson, Ema Gagro
Gelato Sisters	"Back to That Swing"	Tvrtko Hrelec
Jelena Bosančić	"Tell Me"	Jelena Bosančić
Jure Brkljača	"Ne postojim kad nisi tu"	Miroslav Drljača Rus
Kim Verson	"Nisam to što žele"	Kim Verson
Lea Mijatović	"Tebi pripadam"	Igor Ivanović, Marko Vojvodić
Lidija Bačić	"Tek je počelo"	Denis Dumančić, Faruk Buljubašić
Lorena Bućan	"Tower of Babylon"	Tonči Huljić, Ivan Huljić, Vjekoslava Huljić
Luka Nižetić	"Brutalero"	Branimir Mihaljević, Mario Mihaljević
Manntra	"In the Shadows"	Marko Matijević Sekul, Maja Kolarić, Boris Kolarić
Roko Blažević	"The Dream"	Jacques Houdek, Andrea Čubrić, Charlie Mason

==== Final ====
The final took place on 16 February 2019. The winner, "The Dream" performed by Roko Blažević, was determined by a 50/50 combination of votes from ten regional juries and a public televote. In addition to the performances of the competing entries, the show was opened by Sudar Percussion and 2018 Croatian Eurovision entrant Franka Batelić, while Mia Negovetić, 2001 Croatian Eurovision entrant Vanna and Croatian Junior Eurovision Song Contest 2003 winner Dino Jelusić performed as the interval acts.

Final – 16 February 2019
R/O	Artist	Song	Jury	Televote				Total	Place
R/O	Artist	Song	Jury	Phone	SMS	Total	Points	Total	Place
1	Bojan Jambrošić and Danijela Pintarić	"Vrijeme predaje"	0	1,410	775	2,185	6	6	9
2	Jelena Bosančić	"Tell Me"	0	790	157	947	0	0	14
3	Kim Verson	"Nisam to što žele"	0	210	133	343	0	0	16
4	Jure Brkljača	"Ne postojim kad nisi tu"	2	1,328	841	2,169	5	7	8
5	Beta Sudar	"Don't Give Up"	4	1,250	565	1,815	2	6	10
6	Lea Mijatović	"Tebi pripadam"	0	615	221	836	0	0	15
7	Gelato Sisters	"Back to That Swing"	1	827	338	1,165	0	1	12
8	Luka Nižetić	"Brutalero"	3	3,663	3,175	6,838	10	13	3
9	Elis Lovrić	"All I Really Want"	8	831	381	1,194	0	8	7
10	Domenica	"Indigo"	0	817	577	1,394	0	0	13
11	Roko Blažević	"The Dream"	12	7,088	4,436	11,524	12	24	1
12	Ema Gagro	"Redemption"	7	1,063	907	1,970	4	11	5
13	Lidija Bačić	"Tek je počelo"	0	945	564	1,509	1	1	11
14	Lorena Bućan	"Tower of Babylon"	10	3,538	2,047	5,585	8	18	2
15	Bernarda Brunović	"I Believe in True Love"	6	1,145	710	1,855	3	9	6
16	Manntra	"In the Shadows"	5	2,183	1,738	3,921	7	12	4

Detailed Regional Jury Votes
R/O	Song	Zagreb	Vukovar	Varaždin and Čakovec	Rijeka	Pula	Osijek	Zadar	Knin and Šibenik	Split	Dubrovnik	Total	Points
1	"Vrijeme predaje"						3				1	4	0
2	"Tell Me"		1							1		2	0
3	"Nisam to što žele"		10									10	0
4	"Ne postojim kad nisi tu"		2	4	3	3		4	4	4	5	29	2
5	"Don't Give Up"	6	3	12		2	6	3	5		4	41	4
6	"Tebi pripadam"		7	3			2					12	0
7	"Back to the Swing"	2		2	4	5	4	2	2	2		23	1
8	"Brutalero"	12				10			8	8		38	3
9	"All I Really Want"	4	4	1	5	12	10	7	12	3	10	68	8
10	"Indigo"	1		8	2		1	1			6	19	0
11	"The Dream"	8	5	6	12	7	8	6	1	12	12	77	12
12	"Redemption"	3	6	10	8	4	12	5	7	5	2	62	7
13	"Tek je počelo"	5			1	1					3	10	0
14	"Tower of Babylon"	10		7	6	6	7	8	10	10	8	72	10
15	"I Believe in True Love"		12	5	7	8		10	3	6	7	58	6
16	"In the Shadows"	7	8		10		5	12	6	7		55	5

=== Promotion ===
Roko made several appearances across Europe to specifically promote "The Dream" as the Croatian Eurovision entry. On 21 April, Roko performed during the Eurovision Pre-Party Madrid event, which was held at the Sala La Riviera venue in Madrid, Spain and hosted by Tony Aguilar and Julia Varela. On 24 April, Roko performed during the Eurovision Pre-Party, which was held at the Vegas City Hall in Moscow, Russia and hosted by Alexey Lebedev and Andres Safari.

== At Eurovision ==
According to Eurovision rules, all nations with the exceptions of the host country and the "Big Five" (France, Germany, Italy, Spain and the United Kingdom) are required to qualify from one of two semi-finals in order to compete for the final; the top ten countries from each semi-final progress to the final. The European Broadcasting Union (EBU) split up the competing countries into six different pots based on voting patterns from previous contests, with countries with favourable voting histories put into the same pot. On 28 January 2019, a special allocation draw was held which placed each country into one of the two semi-finals, as well as which half of the show they would perform in. Croatia was placed into the second semi-final, to be held on 16 May 2019, and was scheduled to perform in the second half of the show.

Once all the competing songs for the 2019 contest had been released, the running order for the semi-finals was decided by the shows' producers rather than through another draw, so that similar songs were not placed next to each other. Croatia was set to perform in position 10, following the entry from Austria and before the entry from Malta.

The two semi-finals and the final were broadcast in Croatia on HRT 1 and via radio on HR 2 with commentary by Duško Ćurlić. The Croatian spokesperson, who announced the top 12-point score awarded by the Croatian jury during the final, was Monika Lelas Halambek.

=== Semi-final ===
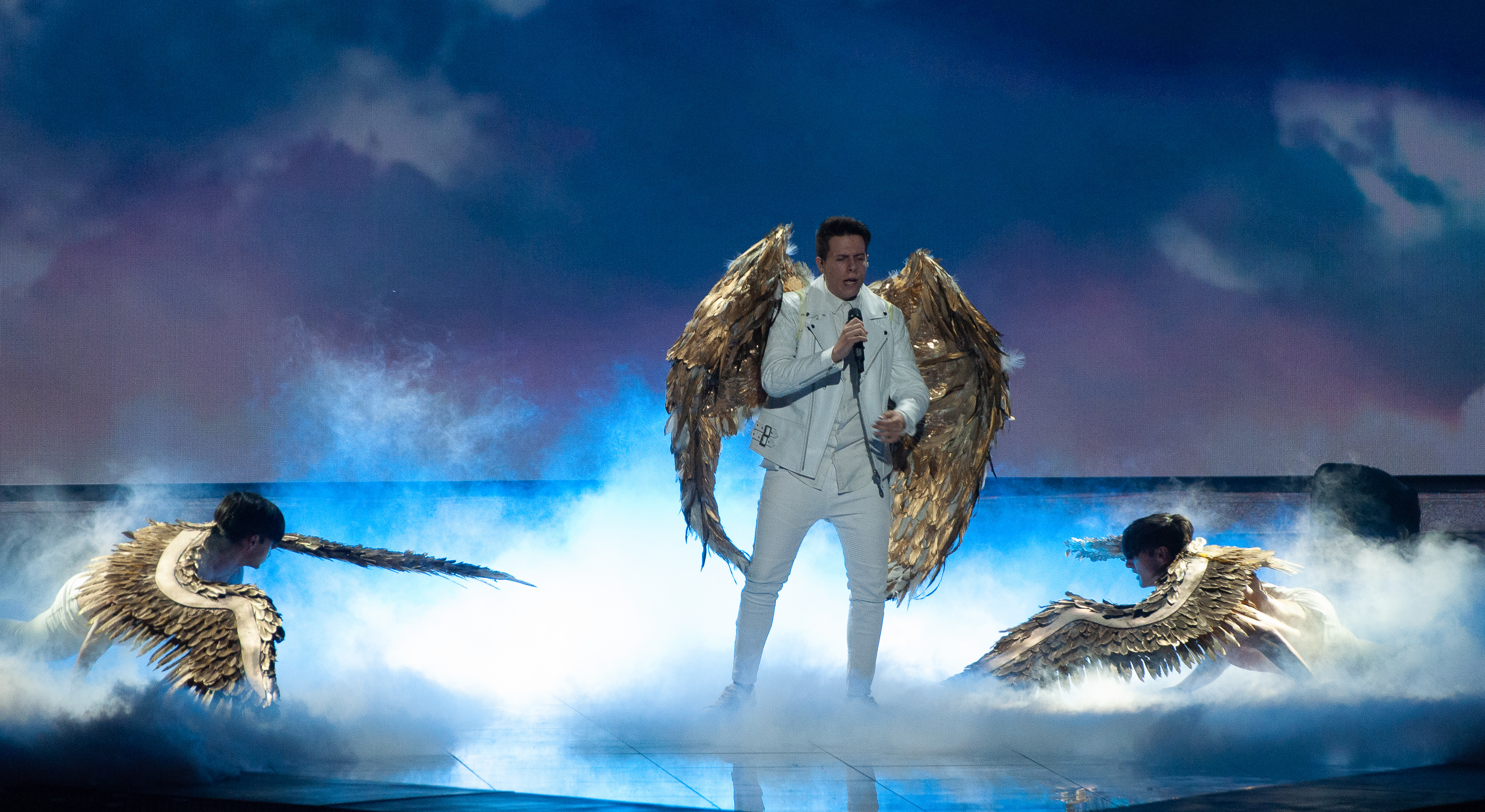
Roko during a rehearsal before the second semi-final

Roko took part in technical rehearsals on 7 and 11 May, followed by dress rehearsals on 15 and 16 May. This included the jury show on 15 May where the professional juries of each country watched and voted on the competing entries.

The Croatian performance featured Roko dressed in white jeans, jacket and shirt and joined on stage by two dancers with golden wings. The performance began with Roko laying on the stage LED floor that displayed angel wings. At the end of the first chorus, the dancers appeared on stage and gave Roko wings over his outfit. The stage LED screens transitioned from fire, meteors and flowing lava to a cloudy daylight sky and displayed the dancers falling to the stage and flying away through clouds towards the sky. The choreographer of the Croatian performance was Leo Mujić. The two dancers that joined Roko were Diego Siqueira and Endi Schrötter. Co-composer of "The Dream" Jacques Houdek also appeared as an off-stage backing vocalist; Houdek previously represented Croatia in the Eurovision Song Contest 2017 where he placed thirteenth in the contest with the song "My Friend".

At the end of the show, Croatia was not announced among the top 10 entries in the first semi-final and therefore failed to qualify to compete in the final. It was later revealed that Croatia placed fourteenth in the semi-final, receiving a total of 64 points: 38 points from the televoting and 26 points from the juries.

=== Voting ===
Voting during the three shows involved each country awarding two sets of points from 1–8, 10 and 12: one from their professional jury and the other from televoting. Each nation's jury consisted of five music industry professionals who are citizens of the country they represent, with their names published before the contest to ensure transparency. This jury judged each entry based on: vocal capacity; the stage performance; the song's composition and originality; and the overall impression by the act. In addition, no member of a national jury was permitted to be related in any way to any of the competing acts in such a way that they cannot vote impartially and independently. The individual rankings of each jury member as well as the nation's televoting results will be released shortly after the grand final.

Below is a breakdown of points awarded to Croatia and awarded by Croatia in the second semi-final and grand final of the contest, and the breakdown of the jury voting and televoting conducted during the two shows:

==== Points awarded to Croatia ====
Points awarded to Croatia (Semi-final 2)
Score	Televote	Jury
12 points		
10 points	North Macedonia	
8 points	Austria	United Kingdom
7 points		
6 points		
5 points	Switzerland	Austria; Denmark; Netherlands
4 points		
3 points	Albania; Germany; Russia	
2 points	Armenia	Albania
1 point	Azerbaijan; Latvia; Malta; Sweden	Ireland

==== Points awarded by Croatia ====
Points awarded by Croatia (Semi-final 2)
Score	Televote	Jury
12 points	North Macedonia	North Macedonia
10 points	Norway	Switzerland
8 points	Switzerland	Netherlands
7 points	Netherlands	Azerbaijan
6 points	Albania	Malta
5 points	Azerbaijan	Albania
4 points	Sweden	Sweden
3 points	Russia	Russia
2 points	Malta	Moldova
1 point	Denmark	Armenia

Points awarded by Croatia (Final)
Score	Televote	Jury
12 points	Italy	Italy
10 points	Slovenia	North Macedonia
8 points	Serbia	Switzerland
7 points	North Macedonia	Czech Republic
6 points	Switzerland	Netherlands
5 points	Norway	Sweden
4 points	Netherlands	Serbia
3 points	Iceland	France
2 points	San Marino	Russia
1 point	Albania	Estonia

==== Detailed voting results ====
The following members comprised the Croatian jury:

- Zlatko Turkalj (jury chairperson) – Managing Editor of the Croatian Radio Entertainment Program Department
- Doris Karamatić – harp professor, harpist
- Bojan Jambrošić – singer
- Silvestar Glojnarić – composer and conductor
- Franka Batelić – singer, represented Croatia in the 2018 contest

Detailed voting results from Croatia (Semi-final 2)
R/O	Country	Jury							Televote	
R/O	Country	D. Karamatić	B. Jambrošić	S. Glojnarić	Z. Turkalj	F. Batelić	Rank	Points	Rank	Points
01	Armenia	6	13	14	8	8	10	1	16	
02	Ireland	8	14	15	17	17	15		14	
03	Moldova	4	9	12	10	10	9	2	15	
04	Switzerland	5	2	4	4	3	2	10	3	8
05	Latvia	11	12	17	11	16	14		13	
06	Romania	12	10	16	12	15	13		12	
07	Denmark	17	17	13	14	13	17		10	1
08	Sweden	7	5	10	5	5	7	4	7	4
09	Austria	16	15	9	15	11	12		17	
10	Croatia									
11	Malta	2	3	7	6	7	5	6	9	2
12	Lithuania	13	11	8	13	12	11		11	
13	Russia	15	6	3	7	6	8	3	8	3
14	Albania	3	4	6	9	9	6	5	5	6
15	Norway	14	16	11	16	14	16		2	10
16	Netherlands	10	8	5	1	1	3	8	4	7
17	North Macedonia	1	1	1	2	2	1	12	1	12
18	Azerbaijan	9	7	2	3	4	4	7	6	5

Detailed voting results from Croatia (Final)
R/O	Country	Jury							Televote	
R/O	Country	D. Karamatić	B. Jambrošić	S. Glojnarić	Z. Turkalj	F. Batelić	Rank	Points	Rank	Points
01	Malta	16	10	20	6	10	12		19	
02	Albania	8	12	17	11	13	15		10	1
03	Czech Republic	5	7	2	3	5	4	7	20	
04	Germany	20	18	14	20	20	21		22	
05	Russia	12	8	6	8	11	9	2	12	
06	Denmark	24	25	22	19	17	24		17	
07	San Marino	25	26	18	26	26	25		9	2
08	North Macedonia	1	2	3	4	4	2	10	4	7
09	Sweden	11	5	8	10	8	6	5	11	
10	Slovenia	13	16	25	14	9	17		2	10
11	Cyprus	14	13	13	23	15	18		21	
12	Netherlands	7	9	16	2	2	5	6	7	4
13	Greece	23	21	19	13	23	22		26	
14	Israel	22	15	11	21	24	20		23	
15	Norway	21	24	15	22	22	23		6	5
16	United Kingdom	17	17	4	16	16	14		25	
17	Iceland	26	22	26	25	25	26		8	3
18	Estonia	3	19	12	18	18	10	1	15	
19	Belarus	18	23	10	17	21	19		24	
20	Azerbaijan	15	14	23	7	7	13		13	
21	France	6	6	21	15	6	8	3	18	
22	Italy	2	3	7	1	1	1	12	1	12
23	Serbia	4	4	24	24	12	7	4	3	8
24	Switzerland	9	1	1	5	3	3	8	5	6
25	Australia	10	11	9	9	14	11		14	
26	Spain	19	20	5	12	19	16		16	
