= Luka Nižetić =

Croatian singer

- Born: 12 August 1983 (age 43); Split, SR Croatia, Yugoslavia
- Genres: Pop, rock
- Occupations: Singer; songwriter; actor
- Instruments: Vocals; guitar; piano
- Years active: 2001–present
- Label: Menart Records

Luka Nižetić (born 12 August 1983) is a Croatian singer. His debut album Premijera was released in 2005. He is best known for his hits "Amsterdam" and "Proljeće" ("Springtime").

== Early life ==
Luka Nižetić was born in Split, SR Croatia, Yugoslavia, as the second child of Tamara and Milo Nižetić. Together with his sister Petra, he grew up in the Mertojak area of the city. His parents noticed Luka's great interest in music at a young age. Consequently, they sent him to nuns for his early music education. A nun, called Cecilia, taught Luka to play the piano. When he was about 11 years old, music professor Mišo Linić started giving Luka lessons in singing and gave him basic knowledge in composing. The opera diva Sanja Erceg–Vrekalo taught him in singing technique. When Luka was about seventeen years old, he composed his first song "Ludi grad" (Oh Crazy Town). The composer Zdenko Runjić included this song in his music festival MHJ 2001. To everybody's surprise, the young singer won three Silver Seagulls as 2nd prize by the expert jury.

== Career ==
In 2004, he signed a contract with Menart Records and published his first album Premijera the following year. The album included singles "Ne krivi me" (Don't Blame Me), "Tebi pjevam" (I'm singing to you), "Ponekad poželim" (Sometimes I wish), "Proljeće" (Springtime) and "Meni trebaš ti" (I need you). After his second performance in the song competition Dora in 2005, where he competed with the song "Proljeće", Luka Nižetić became a well known music personality in Croatia. There followed his nomination for the discographic prize Porin (Croatian equivalent of Grammy) in the category [debutant of the year] as well as a performance in Osijek. Later, Luka reached success in the Croatian Radio Festival in 2006 singing together with Lana Jurčević the hit song "Prava ljubav" (True love); it soon reached the top of almost all Croatian music lists.

In Light Music Festival, Split 2006, he presented the song "More" (The Sea) for which he won the Golden Sail. After the first final evening of the festival, the audience placed him first and in the superfinale, the audience placed him third overall.

On February 16, 2019, Nižetić took part in Dora 2019, the Croatian preselection for the Eurovision Song Contest 2019, with the song “Brutalero”, written by Branimir Mihaljević. He performed eighth and finished third with 13 out of 24 available points, placing behind winner Roko Blažević and runner-up Lorena Bućan. Nižetić took part at Dora 2025 with the song "Južina." At the grand finale held on 2 March 2025, he finished 5th out of 16 participants.

== Discography ==
- Premijera (2005)
- Slobodno dišem (2007)
- Na tren i zavijek (2008)
- Kad zasvira... (2012)
- Ljubav je mukte (2018)
- Ludilo brale (2022)

== Filmography ==
=== Television ===
Year	Title	Role	Notes	Ref.
2003	Dora 2003	Himself	10th place	
2005	Dora 2005	Himself	6th place	
2007	Ples sa zvijezdama	Himself	Season 2, Winner (with Mirjana Žutić)	
2012–14	Volim Hrvatsku	Himself	2 Episodes	
2015–18	Zvjezdice	Himself	Judge	
2020	Dora 2020	Himself	3rd place	
2021	5.com s Danielom	Himself	Guest	
2024–present	Tko to tamo pjeva?	Himself	Panelist	
2025	Dora 2025	Himself	5th place	

Preceded by Zrinka Cvitešić & Nicolas Quesnoit	Ples sa zvijezdama winner Season 2 (2007 with Mirjana Žutić)	Succeeded by Mario Valentić & Ana Herceg
