= Roko Blažević =

Croatian pop singer (born 2000)

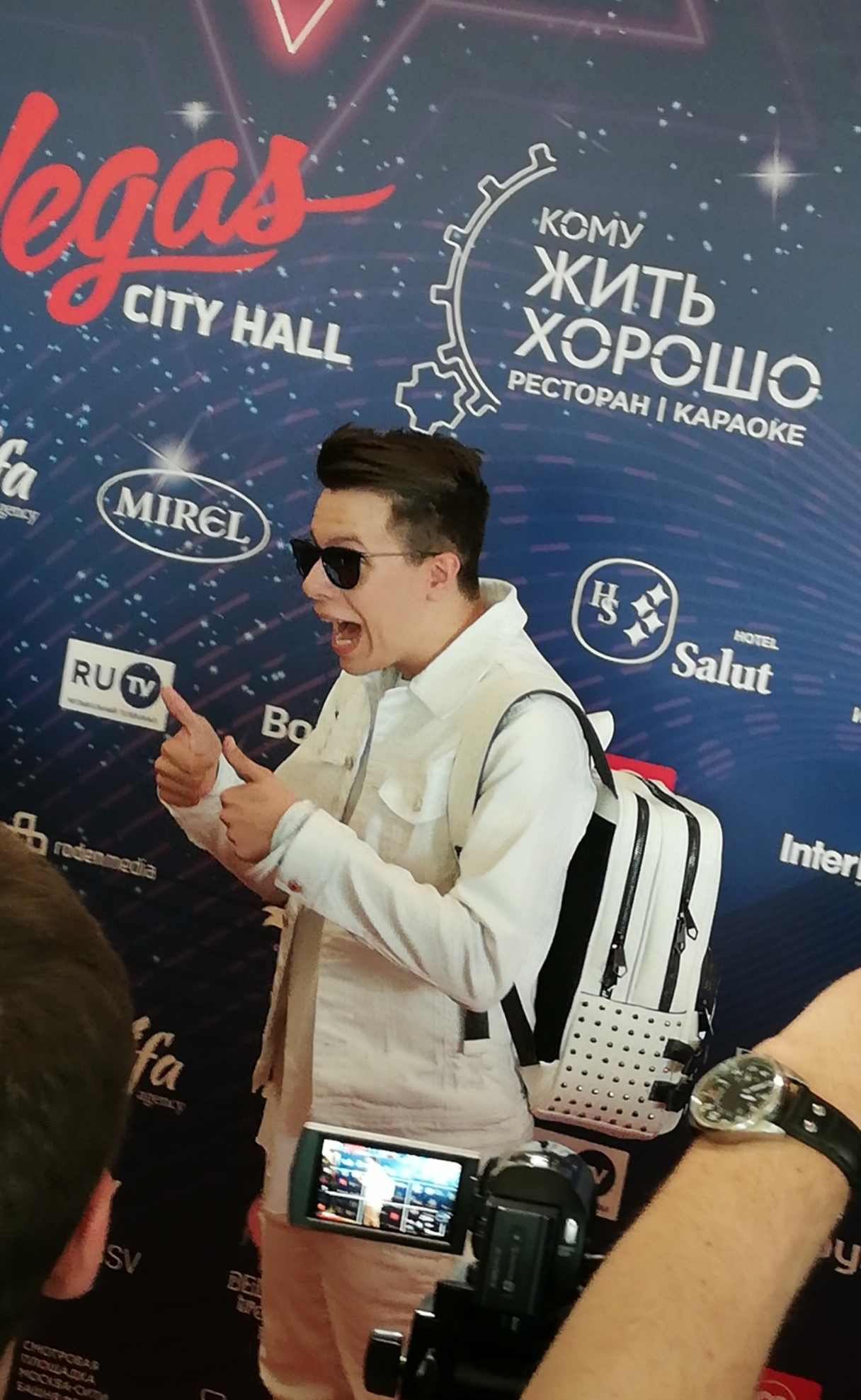
- Roko Blažević in 2019

Background information
- Also known as: Roko
- Born: Roko Blažević; 10 March 2000 (age 26); Split, Croatia
- Genres: Pop; classical crossover
- Occupation: Singer
- Instruments: Piano; organ; vocals
- Years active: 2017–present
- Label: Croatia Records

Roko Blažević (born 10 March 2000), also known as Roko, is a Croatian pop singer. He represented Croatia at the Eurovision Song Contest 2019 with the song "The Dream", having won Dora 2019.

== Early life ==
Blažević was born in Split to mother, Marija Saratlija-Blažević, a singer, and a father, Mario Blažević, also a singer, of the klapa genre. His brother plays upright bass. Roko's ex-girlfriend, Andrea Aužina, has participated in the same season of Zvijezde and in the third season of The Voice Hrvatska.

== Career ==
In July 2017, Blažević won the Serbian reality show Pinkove Zvezdice, as well as in December 2018, he won the second place in the Croatian reality-show, Zvijezde. On 16 February 2019, Blažević won Dora 2019 with the song "The Dream", and afterwards he went on to represent Croatia in the Eurovision Song Contest 2019, but failed to qualify from the second semi-final, placing 14th with 64 points.

On 1 June 2024 he held a concert with Klapa More in Manhattan Beach, California, as a part of Croatian Cultural Heritage Month celebrations.

== Discography ==
=== Singles ===
Title	Year	Peak position	Album
Title	Year	CRO	Album
"Podsjećaš na ljubav"	2018	—	Non-album single
"The Dream"	2019	1	Non-album single
"Krila" (feat. The Messengerso)	2019	—	Non-album single
"Božić nam dolazi"	2020	13	Non-album single
"Exit Lane"	2024	—	Non-album single
"Još te sanjam"	2026	—	Non-album single
"—" denotes releases that did not chart or were not released in that territory.

Awards and achievements
Preceded by Marko Bošnjak	Pinkove Zvezdice; Winner; 2017	Succeeded by Ljuba Stanković
Preceded by Franka with "Crazy"	Croatia in the Eurovision Song Contest; 2019	Succeeded by Damir Kedžo with "Divlji vjetre"
