= Tko to tamo pjeva? =

Croatian television game show

- Genre: Game show
- Based on: I Can See Your Voice by CJ ENM
- Directed by: Ivan Miladinov
- Creative director: Gordana Čorapina Kojundžić
- Presented by: Frano Ridjan
- Starring: Gianna Apostolski; Luka Nižetić; Goran Vinčić; Alka Vuica
- Country of origin: Croatia
- Original language: Croatian
- No. of seasons: 2
- No. of episodes: Regular: 32; Special: 2; Overall: 34

Production
- Executive producer: Goran Marić
- Producer: Sanja Tucman
- Editors: Petra Hercigonja; Sandra Križan; Zorana Rajić; Alen Šalić
- Camera setup: Multi-camera
- Production company: Serena Productions

Original release
- Network: Nova TV
- Release: 15 March 2024 – present

Related
- I Can See Your Voice franchise

Tko to tamo pjeva? (lit. 'Who's singin' over there?') is a Croatian television mystery music game show based on the South Korean programme I Can See Your Voice, featuring its format where a guest artist and contestant(s) attempt to eliminate bad singers from the group, until the last mystery singer remains for a duet performance. It first aired on Nova TV on 15 March 2024.

== Gameplay ==
=== Format ===
Over the course of several rounds, the guest artist and contestant(s) must attempt to eliminate bad singers from a group of nine "mystery singers", identified only by their occupation or alias, without ever hearing them perform live. They are assisted by clues regarding the singers' backgrounds, style of performance, and observations from a celebrity panel. At the end of a game, the last remaining mystery singer is revealed as either good or bad by means of a duet between them and one of the guest artists. (Note: Gameplay notes: The number of rounds are set to six (for the 1st season) or seven (for the 2nd season).; The number of batches in the lip sync round are set to three groups of trios (for the 1st season) or two groups of quartets (from 2nd to 3rd season).; The number of contestants are set to one or a pair.)

The contestant(s) must eliminate one mystery singer at the end of each round, receiving €500 if they eliminate a bad singer. At the end of a game, if the contestant(s) decide to walk away, they will keep the money had won in previous rounds; if they decide to risk for the last remaining mystery singer, they win €5,000 if a singer is good, or lose their all winnings if a singer is bad.

=== Rounds ===
==== Visual rounds ====
- First impression (Croatian: Prvi dojam)

s2–3: The guest artist and contestant(s) are given some time to observe and examine each mystery singer based on their appearance.

- Muted video (Croatian: Ima slike, nema tona)

s1–3: A muted video by one of the mystery singers of their choice that reveals only 0.3 seconds of their singing voice is played as an additional hint.

==== Lip sync rounds ====
Each mystery singer performs a lip sync to a song; good singers mime to a recording of their own, while bad singers mime to a backing track by another vocalist.

- Playback (Croatian: Ponavljanje)

s1–3: The mystery singers are divided into batches, and each of them would have to perform lip sync individually.

- Vocal switch (Croatian: Glasoboj)

s1–3: The mystery singer lip syncs to the good singer's recording, then a bad singer's recording comes in the middle of the performance.

==== Evidence round ====
- That was me! (Croatian: To sam ja!)

s1–3: The guest artist and contestant(s) are presented with a video package containing possible clues by one of the mystery singers of their choice.

==== Rehearsal round ====
- Secret studio (Croatian: Tajni studio)

s1–3: The guest artist and contestant(s) are presented with video from a recording session by one of the mystery singers of their choice, but pitch-shifted to obscure their actual vocals.

==== Interrogation round ====
- Interview (Croatian: Intervju)

s1–3: The guest artist and contestant(s) may ask questions to the remaining mystery singers. Good singers are required to give truthful responses, while the bad singers must lie.

== Production ==
In September 2021, Videostroj initially planned to produce a multinational adaptation of I Can See Your Voice consisting of all countries from the former Yugoslavia, with Una TV assigning as the broadcaster prior to its launch on 21 December 2021. Amidst the U.S. sanctions linked to then-president of Republika Srpska Milorad Dodik, Una TV would also eventually cease operations in July 2024, except its Serbian counterpart under co-management of Srđan Praštalo and Aleksandar Radoš. In January 2024, United Media formally acquired the rights to produce a sole Croatian adaptation of I Can See Your Voice, with Serena Productions assigning on production duties.

== Broadcast history ==
Tko to tamo pjeva? debuted on 15 March 2024.

In October 2024, Nova TV has announced the series' renewal and also commenced auditions for a then-upcoming second season, which premiered on 7 March 2025; it also debuted in Bosnia and Herzegovina on Nova BH through delayed telecast on 13 March 2025.

On 3 October 2025, Glas Slavonije conducted an interview with host Ridjan discussing about the future of Tko to tamo pjeva? whether it should continue into third season; this was formally announced by Nova TV in January 2026. It began airing with back-to-back charity games on 24 April and 1 May 2026, ahead of the proper season premiere on 1 October 2026. (Note: Regular games for the 4th season have been first released by Nova Play, before the actual linear television broadcasts by Nova TV on the following day.)

== Series overview ==
Series	Episodes	Originally released		Good singers	Bad singers
Series	Episodes	First released	Last released	Good singers	Bad singers
1	12	15 March 2024	31 May 2024	11	1
2	12	7 March 2025	23 May 2025	11	1
3	8	1 October 2026	present	8	0
Sp	2	24 April 2026	1 May 2026	2	0

== Episodes ==
=== Season 1 (2024) ===
List of season 1 episodes
No. overall	No. in season	Guest artist(s)	Player order (Note: It refers to the guest artist(s) that have played in according to their first game; returning guest artists (which also include foreigners or former good singers, with their names displaying in italics) are not counted.)	Contestant	Original release date
1	1	Indira Levak (Colonia)	1	Dražen Trogrlić	15 March 2024
2	2	Jasna Zlokić	2	Biserka Hajdek	22 March 2024
3	3	Maja Šuput	3	Hrvoje Barić	29 March 2024
4	4	Luka Nižetić	4	Andra Višnjić	5 April 2024
5	5	Joško Čagalj Jole (Note: Foreign guest artists: Bosnia and Herzegovina — Hanka Paldum and ToMa; Germany — Joško Čagalj Jole; Montenegro — Sergej Ćetković)	5	Brankica Jurić	12 April 2024
6	6	Franka Batelić	6	Natali Rade	19 April 2024
7	7	Damir Kedžo	7	Josip Grubešić	26 April 2024
8	8	Zsa Zsa	8	Matea Katić	3 May 2024
9	9	Domenica Žuvela	9	Paula Eleta Barišić	10 May 2024
10	10	Alka Vuica	10	Lana Gjurić	17 May 2024
11	11	Zorica Kondža	11	Filip Rebić	24 May 2024
12	12	Giuliano Đanić	12	Luka Končarević	31 May 2024

=== Season 2 (2025) ===
List of season 2 episodes
No. overall	No. in season	Guest artist(s)	Player order	Contestant	Original release date
13	1	Miroslav Škoro	13	Kristina Bešić	7 March 2025
14	2	Dražen Zečić	14	Vlatka Bolanča	14 March 2025
15	3	Andrea Šušnjara	15	Krešimir Trunić	21 March 2025
16	4	Hanka Paldum	16	Jan Mihaljević	28 March 2025
17	5	Sandi Cenov	17	Jovana Prpić	4 April 2025
18	6	Nives Celzijus	18	Lovro Vuković	11 April 2025
19	7	Alen Bičević	19	Melita Rakovac	18 April 2025
20	8	Alka Vuica	—	Tajana Ančurovski	25 April 2025
21	9	Minea	20	Ivan Sesar	2 May 2025
22	10	Luka Nižetić	—	Maja Đudarić	9 May 2025
23	11	Sergej Ćetković	21	Paula Mikinac	16 May 2025
24	12	Saša Lozar	22	Josip Dombaj	23 May 2025

=== Season 3 (2026) ===
List of season 3 episodes
No. overall	No. in season	Guest artist(s)	Player order	Contestant	Original release date	Nova TV airing date
25	1	Nives Celzijus	—	Sunčica Andraković	1 October 2026	2 October 2026
26	2	Neda Ukraden	23	Daniel Grabar and Ana Despotušić	8 October 2026	9 October 2026
27	3	Emilija Kokić	24	Nikola and Ivana Trevižan	15 October 2026	16 October 2026
28	4	Ivana Banfić	25	Katica Janjanin	22 October 2026	23 October 2026
29	5	Zdenka Kovačiček	26	Danijel Volarević	29 October 2026	30 October 2026
30	6	ToMa	27	Ani Škorić	5 November 2026	6 November 2026
31	7	Neda Parmać (Feminnem)	28	Paula Čupić	12 November 2026	13 November 2026
32	8	Nives Celzijus	—	Helena Šanda Mitiska	19 November 2026	20 November 2026
33	9	TBA	TBA	TBA	26 November 2026	27 November 2026
34	10	TBA	TBA	TBA	3 December 2026	4 December 2026

=== Specials ===
List of special episodes
No.	Title	Guest artist(s)	Player order	Contestant(s)	Original release date
1	"Charity special — game 1"	Luka Nižetić	—	Valentina Baus and Petar Pereža	24 April 2026
2	"Charity special — game 2"	Alka Vuica	—	Ana Begić Tahiri and Filip Juričić	1 May 2026

== Accolades ==
Event	Year (Note: Indicates the year of ceremony)	Category	Nominee(s)	Result	Ref(s)
L'Adria Story Hall of Fame Awards	2024	Best Croatian TV Show	Tko to tamo pjeva?	Nominated	
