= Alka Vuica =

Croatian singer, lyricist and TV presenter

- Born: 8 June 1961 (age 65); Pula, PR Croatia, Yugoslavia
- Occupation: Singer
- Years active: 1980–present
- Children: 1

Alka Vuica (pronounced [âːlka ʋûitsa]; born 8 June 1961) is a Croatian singer, lyricist and television presenter.

Vuica is most notable for her 1980s and early 1990s songwriting work for popular Yugoslav musical acts such as Željko Bebek, Oliver Mandić (hit song "Dođe mi da vrisnem tvoje ime"), Neki to vole vruće (hit "California"), Denis & Denis (hit "Ja sam lažljiva"), Boris Novković (most of the Jači od sudbine album), Josipa Lisac (hits "Gdje Dunav ljubi nebo" and "Danas sam luda"), Vlado Kalember (hit "Vino na usnama"), Viktorija, and Tajči (hits "Hajde da ludujemo" and "Moj mali je opasan").

In 1994, after a decade of writing songs for other performers, Vuica started a solo singing career with a mixture of pop and commercial Croatian-Balkan folk. Her biggest hits are 1994's "Laži me" and 1999's "Varalica".

== Early life ==
Born in Pula to Zvonko and Zdenka Vuica, she started writing songs at a young age. At the age of 18, she moved to Zagreb where she started a relationship with the Srebrna Krila drummer Adi Karaselimović. She was introduced to composer Đorđe Novković, manager Vladimir Mihaljek and most importantly Goran Bregović.

== Career ==
=== Songwriting ===
In 1980s, she worked as a journalist and as songwriter, especially for Josipa Lisac, for whom she penned "Gdje Dunav ljubi nebo" (Where Danube Kisses the Sky), "Danas sam luda" (Today I'm Crazy), "Kraljica divljine" (Queen of the Wild), "Moja magija" (My Magic) and the album Hoću samo tebe (I Want Only You) which was released in 1983. Throughout the decade she continued to contribute lyrics. In 1990, she contributed to the Yugoslav entry for the Eurovision Song Contest, "Hajde da ludujemo" (Let's Get Crazy), performed by Tajči.

=== Solo performer ===
In the 1990s, she began performing and releasing her own records. In 1993, she released Laži me (1994), which included "O.K." (featuring Sandi Cenov) that was entered as a contender for the first ever Croatian Eurovision Song Contest entry. She released another three albums that decade with limited success, while criticising the restrictions imposed on Croatian performers to appear in other parts of the former Yugoslavia. In 1999, Vuica made an appearance at the New Year celebrations in Belgrade.

She released a further two albums in 2001 and 2004, before making a return to presenting with the talkshow Jedan na jedan on Nova TV, continuing with performing. In May 2020, she released the single "Depresija" (Depression).

=== Television ===
In 2004, Vuica hosted Nova TV's talk show series Jedan na jedan. In 2014, she competed on Celebrity MasterChef. From 2015 to 2016, she was the main judge on RTL's children talent show competition television series Zvijezdice. She hosted the talk show series Vidimo se u Sarajevu, which premiered in April 2019 on Pink BH. Since March 2024, she is a permanent panelist on Nova TV's singing game show series Tko to tamo pjeva?, which is based on the international I Can See Your Voice television franchise.

=== Politics ===
Vuica entered the 2009–10 Croatian presidential election. On 26 October 2009, the Green List announced they were supporting her bid for president. Because of non-sufficient votes, she fell out of race and also noted that 835 votes were stolen from her in Trogir. In 2015, she was called as witness in the Core Media affair involving the newspresenter Dijana Čuljak.

== Personal life ==
In 1988, Vuica met an artist Vuk Veličković, with whom she had a son called Arian, who went on to become a music producer. Her cousin Matija Vuica is a fashion designer.

Viuca is notable for publicly expressing her support towards the LGBTQ community. In June 2024, she performed at the Zagreb Pride, where she was also the godmother to a lesbian couple at their public wedding. She spoke in favor of bisexuality and revealed that she had dated women in the past.

== Discography ==
=== Albums ===
- Alka Vu... Winnetou (1993)
- Laži me (1994)
- Za tebe čuvam sebe (1995)
- Alkatraz (1997)
- Balkan Girl (1999)
- Profesionalka (2001)
- Cirkus (2004)
- Alkina kafana (2013)
- Croatian Summer by Alka (2016)
- Vrijeme za nas (with Zoran Šerbedžija; 2024)
- Ljubavnik (2025)

=== Compilations ===
- The Best of Alka (1996)
- Najljepše ljubavne pjesme (2012)

== Filmography ==
=== Television ===
Year	Title	Role	Notes
2004	Jedan na jedan	Herself	Host
2007	Naša mala klinika	Nada Čokolada	Season 3, episode 23
2013	Volim Hrvatsku	Herself	Contestant, 1 episode
2014	Celebrity MasterChef	Herself	Contestant
2015–2016	Zvjezdice	Herself	Judge
2019	Vidimo se u Sarajevu	Herself	Host
2020	Volim Hrvatsku	Herself	Contestant, 1 episode
2024–present	Tko to tamo pjeva?	Herself	Panelist

=== Film ===
Year	Title	Role
2000	Is It Clear, My Friend?	Pevaljka
