= Het Grote Songfestivalfeest =

Dutch television concert program

- Also known as: The Big Eurovision Party
- Genre: Music concert
- Directed by: Marnix Kaart
- Presented by: Edsilia Rombley; Cornald Maas; Emma Wortelboer (2019); Tim Douwsma (2019); Buddy Vedder (2019); Rylan Clark (2023, 2025); Tia Kofi (2024)
- Starring: 2019: 31 acts from 1969 onwards (22 broadcast); 2022: 31 acts from 1969 onwards; 2023: 26 acts from 1980 onwards; 2024: 25 acts from 1973 onwards; 2025: 28 acts from 1980 onwards including 2 songs from Eurovision Song Contest: The Story of Fire Saga
- Country of origin: Netherlands

Production
- Executive producer: Manon van Alten
- Producer: Eline Roos
- Production locations: Ziggo Dome, Amsterdam, Netherlands
- Running time: 90–120 minutes
- Production company: PilotStudio

Original release
- Network: NPO 3
- Release: 1 January 2020 – present

Related
- Eurovision Song Contest

Het Grote Songfestivalfeest (Dutch pronunciation: [ət ˈxroːtə ˈsɔŋfɛstivɑlˌfeːst]; English: The Big Eurovision Party) is a Dutch television concert programme starring artists of the Eurovision Song Contest, produced by PilotStudio, and held at the Ziggo Dome in Amsterdam. Originally commissioned for the occasion of the Eurovision Song Contest 2020 in Rotterdam prior to its cancellation, five editions of the show have been held. Cornald Maas and Edsilia Rombley are the regular presenters of the programme. The show is broadcast in a number of European countries as supplementary Eurovision programming ahead of or during the contest weeks, and inspired a Junior Songfestival-themed spin-off programme that was first held in 2024 at Rotterdam Ahoy.

== Presenters ==
The first edition of the show in 2019 was originally planned to be hosted by Dutch Eurovision commentators Cornald Maas and Jan Smit, however, the latter had to withdraw due to illness and was later replaced by one of his Eurovision 2020 co-hosts, Edsilia Rombley. Rombley, who represented the Netherlands in the 1998 and 2007 contests, also performed her entries during the concert. Former Dutch spokespersons Emma Wortelboer and Tim Douwsma, as well as Junior Eurovision Song Contest commentator Buddy Vedder, also appeared as presenters during the show to introduce some of the acts. Maas and Rombley returned as hosts for the subsequent four editions, joined by Rylan Clark in 2023 and 2025, and Tia Kofi in 2024.

== Performances ==
=== 2019 edition ===
The first edition was held on 15 December 2019, with 31 Eurovision acts from 17 countries participating.

Order (Note: The order of the performances during the concert)	Broadcast (Note: The order of the performances during the broadcast)	Year	Country	Artist	Song
01	01	2016	Russia	Sergey Lazarev	"You Are the Only One"
02	02	2004	Ukraine	Ruslana (Note: Performed with Slagerij van Kampen)	"Wild Dances"
03	No	2008	Sweden	Charlotte Perrelli	"Hero"
04	03	1998	Israel	Dana International	"Diva"
05	No	2019	Russia	Sergey Lazarev	"Scream"
06	No	1978	Israel	Izhar Cohen	"A-Ba-Ni-Bi"
07	04	1986	Belgium	Sandra Kim	"J'aime la vie"
08	No	1977	France	Marie Myriam	"L'Oiseau et l'Enfant"
09	No	1973	Luxembourg	Anne-Marie David	"Tu te reconnaîtras"
10	No	1983	Luxembourg	Corinne Hermès	"Si la vie est cadeau"
11	07	1998	Netherlands	Edsilia Rombley	"Hemel en aarde"
11	07	2007	Netherlands	Edsilia Rombley	"On Top of the World"
12	No	1986	Netherlands	Marlayne and Mandy	"Alles heeft ritme"
12	No	1999	Netherlands	Marlayne and Mandy	"One Good Reason"
12	No	1974	Sweden	Marlayne and Mandy	"Waterloo" (Note: Performed at Eurovision by ABBA)
13	06	1975	Netherlands	Getty Kaspers	"Ding-a-dong" (Note: Teach-In cover)
14	09	2013	Denmark	Emmelie de Forest	"Only Teardrops"
15	No	1993	Ireland	Niamh Kavanagh	"In Your Eyes"
16	No	1996	Ireland	Eimear Quinn	"The Voice"
17	08	1999	Sweden	Charlotte Perrelli	"Take Me to Your Heaven"
18	05	1997	United Kingdom	Katrina Leskanich	"Love Shine a Light" (Note: Performed at Eurovision by Katrina and the Waves)
19	10	2019	Norway	Keiino	"Spirit in the Sky"
20	No	2000	Denmark	Jørgen Olsen	"Fly on the Wings of Love" (Note: Performed at Eurovision by the Olsen Brothers)
21	12	1969	Netherlands	Lenny Kuhr	"De troubadour"
22	13	1993	Netherlands	Ruth Jacott	"Vrede"
23	14	1982	Germany	Nicole	"Ein bißchen Frieden"
24	15	1980	Ireland	Johnny Logan	"What's Another Year"
24	15	1987	Ireland	Johnny Logan	"Hold Me Now"
25	16	1992	Ireland	Linda Martin	"Why Me?"
26	17	1979	Israel	Gali Atari (Note: Performed with Tim Douwsma and Buddy Vedder)	"Hallelujah" (Note: Performed at Eurovision by Milk and Honey)
27	18	2018	Israel	Netta	"Toy"
28	19	2019	San Marino	Serhat	"Say Na Na Na"
29	No	2011	Azerbaijan	Eldar Gasimov and Marlayne (Note: Only Gasimov of the duo Ell and Nikki was able to perform, so Marlayne Sahupala performed the parts of Nigar Jamal)	"Running Scared"
30	11	2019	Italy	Mahmood	"Soldi"
31	20	2007	Ukraine	Verka Serduchka	"Dancing Lasha Tumbai"
32	21	2018	Cyprus	Eleni Foureira	"Fuego"
33	22	2012	Sweden	Loreen	"Euphoria"

Key

No	– Performances were not shown during the broadcast

==== Withdrawn artists ====
The original list of the performers also included Willeke Alberti, the Dutch representative at the Eurovision Song Contest 1994, who missed the show due to illness. Finland's Lordi and Russia's Dima Bilan, who won the contest in 2006 and 2008 respectively, were expected to perform, but they later withdrew their participation. Helena Paparizou was also invited, but couldn't participate in person due to a scheduling clash with a live broadcast of The Voice of Greece. Instead, she sent a video message in which she sang the refrain of her 2005 winning song "My Number One".

=== 2022 edition ===
The second edition was held on 17 November 2022, with 31 Eurovision acts from 16 countries participating.

Order	Broadcast			Year	Country	Artist	Song
Order	BBC One	NPO 3	VRT 1	Year	Country	Artist	Song
01	01	01	No	2021	Lithuania	The Roop	"Discoteque"
02	02	02	No	2021	Greece	Stefania	"Last Dance"
03	No	07	02	1986	Belgium	Sandra Kim	"J'aime la vie"
04	No	08	No	1986	Netherlands	Frizzle Sizzle	"Alles heeft ritme"
05	No	No	No	1984	Sweden	Herreys	"Diggi-Loo Diggi-Ley"
06	03	03	01	2009	Norway	Alexander Rybak	"Fairytale"
07	05	04	No	2021	Norway	Tix	"Fallen Angel"
08	06	05	No	2021	Azerbaijan	Efendi	"Mata Hari"
09	No	No	No	2018	Germany	Michael Schulte	"You Let Me Walk Alone"
10	12	06	No	2021	Switzerland	Gjon's Tears	"Tout l'univers"
11	No	No	No	2001	Greece	Antique	"(I Would) Die for You"
12	08	09	03	1980	Ireland	Johnny Logan	"What's Another Year"
12	08	09	No	1987	Ireland	Johnny Logan	"Hold Me Now"
13	No	10	04	1991	Sweden	Carola Häggkvist	"Fångad av en stormvind"
14	07	13	05	2005	Greece	Helena Paparizou	"My Number One"
15	No	No (Note: Included in reruns)	No	1969	Netherlands	Lenny Kuhr	"De troubadour"
16	No	11	No	1998	Netherlands	Edsilia Rombley	"Hemel en aarde"
16	No	No	No	2007	Netherlands	Edsilia Rombley	"On Top of the World"
17	No	12	No	2017	Netherlands	OG3NE	"Lights and Shadows"
17	No	No	No	1974	Sweden	OG3NE	"Waterloo"
18	09	14	No	2022	Norway	Subwoolfer (Note: Performed with Alexander Rybak)	"Give That Wolf a Banana"
19	10	No	No	2019	Norway	Keiino	"Spirit in the Sky"
20	11	No	06	2006	Finland	Lordi	"Hard Rock Hallelujah"
21	13	No	No	2022	Australia	Sheldon Riley	"Not the Same"
22	17	15	07	2016	Ukraine	Jamala	"1944"
23	18	16	08	2022	Ukraine	Kalush Orchestra	"Stefania"
24	19	17	09	2021	Ukraine	Go_A	"Shum"
25	04	No	No	2021	San Marino	Senhit	"Adrenalina"
26	14	18	10	2018	Israel	Netta	"Toy"
27	No	19	11	2022	Netherlands	S10	"De diepte"
28	16	20	12	2019	Netherlands	Duncan Laurence	"Arcade"
29	20	21	13	2015	Sweden	Måns Zelmerlöw	"Heroes"
30	15	22	14	2014	Austria	Conchita Wurst	"Rise Like a Phoenix"
31	21	23	15	2012	Sweden	Loreen	"Euphoria"

Key

No	– Performances were not shown during the broadcast

==== Withdrawn artists ====
Prior to its postponement from the original December 2021 date, the initial list of performers for the second edition included Brotherhood of Man, the British winners of the Eurovision Song Contest 1976; Bobbysocks!, the Norwegian winners of the Eurovision Song Contest 1985; Sertab Erener, the Turkish winner of the Eurovision Song Contest 2003; Eleni Foureira, the Cypriot runner-up of the Eurovision Song Contest 2018; Kristian Kostov, the Bulgarian runner-up of the Eurovision Song Contest 2017; Marija Šerifović, the Serbian winner of the Eurovision Song Contest 2007; and Verka Serduchka, the Ukrainian runner-up of the Eurovision Song Contest 2007. Sam Ryder, the British runner-up of the Eurovision Song Contest 2022, was also due to appear, but later withdrew his participation due to other obligations.

=== 2023 edition ===
The third edition was held on 16 November 2023, with 27 Eurovision acts from 18 countries participating. Gali Atari, the Israeli winner of the Eurovision Song Contest 1979 as part of Milk and Honey, was due to appear but later withdrew due to the Gaza war.

Order	Broadcast				Year	Country	Artist	Song
Order	BBC One	NPO 3	NRK1	VRT1	Year	Country	Artist	Song
01	01	01	01	01	2015	Sweden	Måns Zelmerlöw	"Heroes"
02	02	02	02	No	2022	Romania	Wrs	"Llámame"
03	03	03	No	04	2022	Sweden	Cornelia Jakobs	"Hold Me Closer"
04	No	04	05	02	1985	Norway	Bobbysocks!	"La det swinge"
05	05	No	11	13	2019	Norway	Keiino	"Spirit in the Sky"
06	No	No	03	12	2013	Denmark	Emmelie de Forest	"Only Teardrops"
07	14	05	04	05	2004	Ukraine	Ruslana	"Wild Dances"
08	No	06	No	No	1993	Netherlands	Ruth Jacott	"Vrede"
09	No	07	No	No	2000	Netherlands	Linda Wagenmakers	"No Goodbyes"
10	08	08	No	06	1998	Netherlands	Edsilia Rombley	"Hemel en aarde"
11	09	No	07	07	2021	Switzerland	Gjon's Tears	"Tout l'univers"
12	No	09	08	No	2008	Sweden	Charlotte Perrelli	"Hero"
12	07	10	09	10	1999	Sweden	Charlotte Perrelli	"Take Me to Your Heaven"
13	15	No	No	No	2011	Azerbaijan	Ell and Nikki	"Running Scared"
14	18	No	No	No	2023	Estonia	Alika	"Bridges"
15	19	11	No	No	2019	Switzerland	Luca Hänni	"She Got Me"
16	16	12	12	14	1980	Ireland	Johnny Logan	"What's Another Year"
16	16	13	13	15	1987	Ireland	Johnny Logan	"Hold Me Now"
17	17	14	14	16	2023	Sweden	Gjon's Tears	"Tattoo" (Note: Performed at Eurovision by Loreen)
18	06	15	06	03	2022	Armenia	Rosa Linn	"Snap"
19	No	No	No	No	2021	Greece	Stefania	"Last Dance"
20	No	16	10	08	2021	Lithuania	The Roop	"Discoteque"
21	No	No	No	No	2019	San Marino	Serhat	"Say Na Na Na"
22	13	17	No	11	2023	Belgium	Gustaph	"Because of You"
23	04	18	17	09	2023	Norway	Alessandra	"Queen of Kings"
24	12	19	15	17	2007	Ukraine	Verka Serduchka	"Dancing Lasha Tumbai"
25	11	20	16	18	2018	Cyprus	Eleni Foureira	"Fuego"
26	10	21	18	19	2023	Finland	Käärijä	"Cha Cha Cha"
27	20	22	19	20	2014	Austria	Conchita Wurst	"Rise Like a Phoenix"

Key

No	– Performances were not shown during the broadcast

=== 2024 edition ===
The fourth edition was held on 12 December 2024, with 25 Eurovision acts from 15 countries participating. Sakis Rouvas, who represented Greece in the Eurovision Song Contest 2004 and 2009, was due to appear but later withdrew due to illness.

Order	Broadcast				Year	Country	Artist	Song
Order	BBC One	VRT1 (Note: Split into two parts)	NRK1	NPO 3	Year	Country	Artist	Song
01	01	1.01	01	01	2012	Sweden	Loreen	"Euphoria"
02	21	No	No	No	2016	Bulgaria	Poli Genova	"If Love Was a Crime"
03	22	No	No	No	2017	Bulgaria	Kristian Kostov	"Beautiful Mess"
04	03	1.03	03	02	2007	Serbia	Marija Šerifović	"Molitva"
05	04	1.02	04	03	1997	United Kingdom	Katrina Leskanich	"Love Shine a Light" (Note: Performed at Eurovision by Katrina and the Waves)
06	No	1.10	No	No	1973	Luxembourg	Anne-Marie David	"Tu te reconnaîtras"
07	No	2.02	07	No	1982	Germany	Nicole (with Edsilia Rombley)	"Ein bißchen Frieden"
08	07	No	02	17	2024	Ukraine	Alyona Alyona and Jerry Heil	"Teresa & Maria"
09	08	No	06	05	2015	Australia	Guy Sebastian	"Tonight Again"
09	No	No	No	No	Non-Eurovision song		Guy Sebastian	"Before I Go"
10	No	1.05	No	06	2003	Netherlands	Esther Hart	"One More Night"
10	No	1.06	No	07	1999	Netherlands	Marlayne and Esther Hart	"One Good Reason"
10	No	1.07	No	08	1986	Netherlands	Mandy Huydts, Marlayne and Esther Hart	"Alles heeft ritme" (Note: Performed at Eurovision by Frizzle Sizzle)
10	No	1.08	No	09	1974	Sweden	Mandy Huydts, Marlayne and Esther Hart	"Waterloo"
11	09	2.07	08	10	1980	Ireland	Johnny Logan	"What's Another Year"
11	10	2.08	09	11	1987	Ireland	Johnny Logan	"Hold Me Now"
12	11	No	No	12	1998	Netherlands	Edsilia Rombley	"Hemel en aarde"
13	No	2.05	No	13	1980	Netherlands	Maggie MacNeal	"Amsterdam"
14	12	1.04	10	No	2023	Norway	Alessandra	"Queen of Kings"
15	13	No	No	No	2020	Switzerland	Gjon's Tears	"Répondez-moi"
15	14	No	12	14	2021	Switzerland	Gjon's Tears	"Tout l'univers"
16	15	2.04	13	15	2022	Netherlands	S10	"De diepte"
17	No	No	No	No	Non-Eurovision song		Loreen	"Is It Love"
17	No	No	No	No	Non-Eurovision song		Loreen	"Forever"
17	16	2.01	14	16	2023	Sweden	Loreen	"Tattoo"
18	17	2.06	15	22	2024	Ireland	Bambie Thug	"Doomsday Blue"
19	18	2.03	11	18	2021	Ukraine	Go_A	"Shum"
20	19	No	05	No	2021	Cyprus	Elena Tsagrinou	"El Diablo"
21	No	1.11	16	19	2007	Ukraine	Verka Serduchka	"Dancing Lasha Tumbai"
22	20	1.09	17	20	2024	Sweden	Marcus & Martinus	"Unforgettable"
23	02	2.09	18	21	2024	Croatia	Baby Lasagna	"Rim Tim Tagi Dim"
24	06	1.12	19	23	2023	Finland	Käärijä	"Cha Cha Cha"
25	23	2.10	20	04	2024	Switzerland	Nemo	"The Code"

Key

No	– Performances were not shown during the broadcast

=== 2025 edition ===
The fifth edition was held on 20 November 2025, with 26 artists from 15 countries participating. Willeke Alberti, who represented the Netherlands in the Eurovision Song Contest 1994, was due to appear but later withdrew due to illness.

Order	Broadcast		Year	Country	Artist	Song
Order	NPO 3	NRK1	Year	Country	Artist	Song
01	01	01	2023	Finland	Käärijä	"Cha Cha Cha"
02	No	02	Non-Eurovision song		Käärijä	"Discoballs"
03	02	03	2024	Austria	Kaleen	"We Will Rave"
04	03	No	2021	Greece	Stefania	"Last Dance"
05	No	No	2020	Greece	Stefania	"Supergirl"
06	04	04	2025	United Kingdom	Remember Monday	"What the Hell Just Happened?"
07	05	No	2022	United Kingdom	Remember Monday	"Space Man" (Note: Performed at Eurovision by Sam Ryder)
08	06	No	2018	Austria	Cesár Sampson	"Nobody but You"
09	No	05	—N/a (Note: Melodi Grand Prix 2021 entry)	Norway	Keiino	"Monument"
10	No	06	2019	Norway	Keiino	"Spirit in the Sky"
11	07	07	2023	Slovenia	Joker Out	"Carpe Diem"
12	08	08	2015	Sweden	Måns Zelmerlöw	"Heroes"
13	09	09	—N/a (Note: Songs from Eurovision Song Contest: The Story of Fire Saga)		Molly Sandén (Note: Molly Sandén has not participated in the Eurovision Song Contest. However, she represented Sweden in the Junior Eurovision Song Contest 2006 and was the singing voice for Sigrit Ericksdóttir in the film Eurovision Song Contest: The Story of Fire Saga (2020).)	"Husavik"
14	No	10	—N/a		Molly Sandén and Rylan Clark	"Ja Ja Ding Dong"
15	No	No	2010	Netherlands	Sieneke	"Ik ben verliefd (sha-la-lie)"
16	No	11	1980	Ireland	Johnny Logan	"What's Another Year"
17	No	12	1987	Ireland	Johnny Logan	"Hold Me Now"
18	10	No	1998	United Kingdom	Imaani	"Where Are You?"
19	11	No	2007	Netherlands	Edsilia Rombley and Imaani	"On Top of the World"
20	No	No	2020	Netherlands	Jeangu Macrooy	"Grow"
21	No	13	—N/a (Note: Melodifestivalen 2023 entry)	Sweden	Marcus & Martinus	"Air"
22	No	No	—N/a (Note: Melodifestivalen 2025 entry)	Sweden	Måns Zelmerlöw	"Revolution"
23	No	14	1995	Norway	Secret Garden	"Nocturne"
24	No	15	2010	Moldova	SunStroke Project and Olia Tira	"Run Away"
25	12	16	2017	Moldova	SunStroke Project	"Hey Mamma"
26	13	18	2007	Ukraine	Verka Serduchka	"Dancing Lasha Tumbai"
27	14	20	2025	Norway	Kyle Alessandro	"Lighter"
28	15	19	2024	Sweden	Marcus & Martinus	"Unforgettable"
29	16	21	2025	Netherlands	Claude	"C'est la vie"
30	No	17	2025	Belgium	Red Sebastian	"Strobe Lights"
31	17	22	2025	Denmark	Sissal	"Hallucination"
32	18	23	2021	Malta	Destiny	"Je me casse"
33	19	24	2022	Spain	Chanel	"SloMo"
34	20	25	2025	Malta	Miriana Conte	"Serving"
35	21	26	2025	Austria	JJ	"Wasted Love"

Key

No	– Performances were not shown during the broadcast

=== 2026 edition ===
The sixth edition was held on 13 November 2026, with 27 Eurovision acts from 16 countries participating. Laura Tesoro, who represented Belgium in the Eurovision Song Contest 2016, was scheduled to perform before she withdrew due to "personal considerations".

Order	Year	Country	Artist	Song
01	2026	Denmark	Søren Torpegaard Lund	"Før vi går hjem"
02	2009	Norway	Alexander Rybak	"Fairytale"
03	2025	Germany	Abor & Tynna	"Baller"
04	1999	Sweden	Charlotte Perrelli	"Take Me To Your Heaven"
05	2022	Estonia	Stefan	"Hope"
06	2023	Cyprus	Andrew Lambrou	"Break a Broken Heart"
07	2025	Latvia	Tautumeitas	"Bur man laimi"
08	2021	San Marino	Senhit	"Adrenalina"
09	1975	Netherlands	Senhit	"Ding-a-dong" (Note: Featuring drag queens Janey Jacké, Envy Peru, Tabitha, and Chelseaboy. Performed at Eurovision by Teach-In)
10	1980	Ireland	Johnny Logan	"What's Another Year"
11	1987	Ireland	Johnny Logan	"Hold Me Now"
12	1992	Ireland	Linda Martin	"Why Me?" (Note: Performed together with Johnny Logan)
13	1986	Belgium	Sandra Kim	"J'aime la vie"
14	2026	Norway	Jonas Lovv	"Ya Ya Ya"
15	2020	Azerbaijan	Efendi	"Cleopatra"
16	2021	Azerbaijan	Efendi	"Mata Hari"
17	—N/a (Note: Dansk Melodi Grand Prix 2026 entry)	Denmark	Sissal	"Infinity"
18	2019	Sweden	John Lundvik	"Too Late for Love"
19	2019	Netherlands	Jonas Lovv	"Arcade" (Note: Performed at Eurovision by Duncan Laurence)
20	2016	Australia	Dami Im	"Sound of Silence"
21	1980	Netherlands	Maggie MacNeal	"Amsterdam"
22	2021	Bulgaria	Victoria	"Growing Up Is Getting Old"
23	1984	Sweden	Herreys	"Diggi-Loo Diggi-Ley"
24	2022	Sweden	Cornelia Jakobs	"Hold Me Closer"
25	2008	Sweden	Charlotte Perrelli	"Hero"
26	2022	Norway	Subwoolfer	"Give That Wolf a Banana"
27	2025	Ireland	Emmy	"Laika Party" (Note: Performed together with Subwoolfer)
28	2025	Estonia	Tommy Cash	"Espresso Macchiato"
29	2026	Cyprus	Antigoni	"Jalla"
30	2025	Denmark	Sissal	"Hallucination"
31	2024	Croatia	Baby Lasagna	"Rim Tim Tagi Dim"
32	2025	Interval act in the final	Käärijä and Baby Lasagna	"#eurodab"
33	2023	Finland	Käärijä	"Cha Cha Cha"
34	2025	Finland	Erika Vikman	"Ich Komme"

== Appearances ==
Country	Debut year	Most recent appearance	Acts
Armenia	2023	2023	1
Australia	2022	2026	3
Austria	2022	2025	5
Azerbaijan	2019	2026	4
Belgium	2019	2026	5
Bulgaria	2024	2026	3
Croatia	2024	2026	2
Cyprus	2019	2026	5
Denmark	2019	2026	6
Estonia	2023	2026	3
Finland	2022	2026	6
France	2019	2019	1
Germany	2019	2026	4
Greece	2022	2025	5
Ireland	2019	2026	12
Israel	2019	2022	5
Italy	2019	2019	1
Latvia	2026	2026	1
Lithuania	2022	2023	2
Luxembourg	2019	2024	3
Malta	2025	2025	2
Moldova	2025	2025	2
Netherlands	2019	2026	25
Norway	2019	2026	15
Romania	2023	2023	1
Russia	2019	2019	1
San Marino	2019	2026	4
Serbia	2024	2024	1
Slovenia	2025	2025	1
Spain	2025	2025	1
Sweden	2019	2026	17
Switzerland	2022	2024	5
Ukraine	2019	2025	11
United Kingdom	2019	2025	4

=== Multiple artist appearances ===
Country	Artist	Appearances
Austria	Conchita Wurst	2
Azerbaijan	Efendi	2
Azerbaijan	Eldar Gasimov	2
Belgium	Sandra Kim	3
Croatia	Baby Lasagna	2
Cyprus	Eleni Foureira	2
Denmark	Emmelie de Forest	2
Denmark	Sissal	2
Finland	Käärijä	4
Greece	Helena Paparizou (Note: First appearance as part of Antique, second appearance as herself (both in 2022))	2
Greece	Stefania	3
Ireland	Johnny Logan	6
Ireland	Linda Martin	2
Israel	Netta	2
Lithuania	The Roop	2
Moldova	SunStroke Project (Note: Appeared once as SunStroke Project and once as SunStroke Project and Olia Tira (both in 2025))	2
Netherlands	Edsilia Rombley	5
Netherlands	Lenny Kuhr	2
Netherlands	Maggie MacNeal	2
Netherlands	Mandy Huydts (Note: Appeared twice as part of Marlayne and Mandy (2019 and 2024), and once as part of Frizzle Sizzle (2022))	3
Netherlands	Ruth Jacott	2
Netherlands	S10	2
Norway	Alessandra	2
Norway	Alexander Rybak	2
Norway	Keiino	4
Norway	Subwoolfer	2
San Marino	Serhat	2
San Marino	Senhit	2
Sweden	Charlotte Perrelli	3
Sweden	Cornelia Jakobs	2
Sweden	Herrey's	2
Sweden	Loreen	3
Sweden	Marcus & Martinus	2
Sweden	Måns Zelmerlöw	3
Switzerland	Gjon's Tears	3
Ukraine	Go_A	2
Ukraine	Ruslana	2
Ukraine	Verka Serduchka	4
United Kingdom	Katrina Leskanich	2

== Broadcasting ==
All editions of Het Grote Songfestivalfeest are broadcast in several countries by member broadcasters of the European Broadcasting Union that participate in the Eurovision Song Contest. In most cases, it is aired as part of the broadcasters' programming plans for the forthcoming contest. Some performances in the concert are cut from their respective broadcasts.

Broadcasters and commentators per edition
Edition	Country	Date of broadcast	Time	Channel(s)	Commentator(s)	Ref(s)
2019	Netherlands	1 January 2020	20:25 CET	NPO 3	No commentary	
2019	Netherlands	1 January 2020	21:40 CET	BVN	No commentary	
2019	Greece	29 February 2020 (part 1)	16:00 EET	ERT1	No commentary	
2019	Greece	1 March 2020 (part 2)	16:00 EET	ERT1	No commentary	
2019	Australia (Note: The concert was broadcast under the title The Road to Eurovision 2020: The Winners and was part of an alternate Australian Eurovision broadcasting plan that took place from 10–17 May due to the cancellation of the 2020 contest.)	10 May 2020	20:30 AEST	SBS Viceland	No commentary	
2022	United Kingdom (Note: The broadcast of the concert acted as a pre-event prior to the Eurovision Song Contest 2023 in Liverpool.)	1 January 2023	00:45 GMT	BBC One	Rylan Clark (Note: Recorded additional links and short interviews backstage for the BBC broadcast)	
2022	United Kingdom	1 January 2023	01:30 GMT	BBC One Scotland	Rylan Clark	
2022	Netherlands	4 January 2023	21:15 CET	NPO 3	No commentary	
2022	Belgium	6 May 2023	21:20 CET	VRT 1	Peter Van de Veire	
2022	United Kingdom	12 May 2023	20:30 GMT	BBC Three	Rylan Clark	
2023	United Kingdom	1 March 2024	22:55 GMT	BBC One	No commentary	
2023	Norway	22 March 2024	22:05 CET	NRK1	No commentary	
2023	Belgium	27 April 2024 (part 1)	Unknown	VRT 1	No commentary	
2023	Belgium	4 May 2024 (part 2)	Unknown	VRT 1	No commentary	
2023	Netherlands	8 May 2024	20:25 CET	NPO 3	No commentary	
2023	United Kingdom	10 May 2024	22:00 GMT	BBC Three	No commentary	
2024	United Kingdom	7 March 2025	23:40 GMT	BBC One	Tia Kofi	
2024	United Kingdom	8 March 2025	01:10 GMT	BBC One Scotland	Tia Kofi	
2024	Australia	10 April 2025	— (Note: Video on demand)	SBS On Demand	No commentary	
2024	Finland	21 April 2025	—	Yle Areena	No commentary	
2024	Belgium	25 April 2025 (part 1)	21:35 CET	VRT 1	No commentary	
2024	Belgium	2 May 2025 (part 2)	21:20 CET	VRT 1	No commentary	
2024	Norway	10 May 2025	20:55 CET	NRK1	No commentary	
2024	Sweden	10 May 2025	—	SVT Play	No commentary	
2024	Finland	16 May 2025	22:00 EET	Yle TV2	No commentary	
2024	Netherlands	16 May 2025	20:30 CET	NPO 3	No commentary	
2025	Norway	3 April 2026	—	NRK TV	No commentary	
2025	Netherlands	15 May 2026	20:25 CET	NPO 3	No commentary	

== Gallery ==
Selection of Het Grote Songfestivalfeest 2019 participants

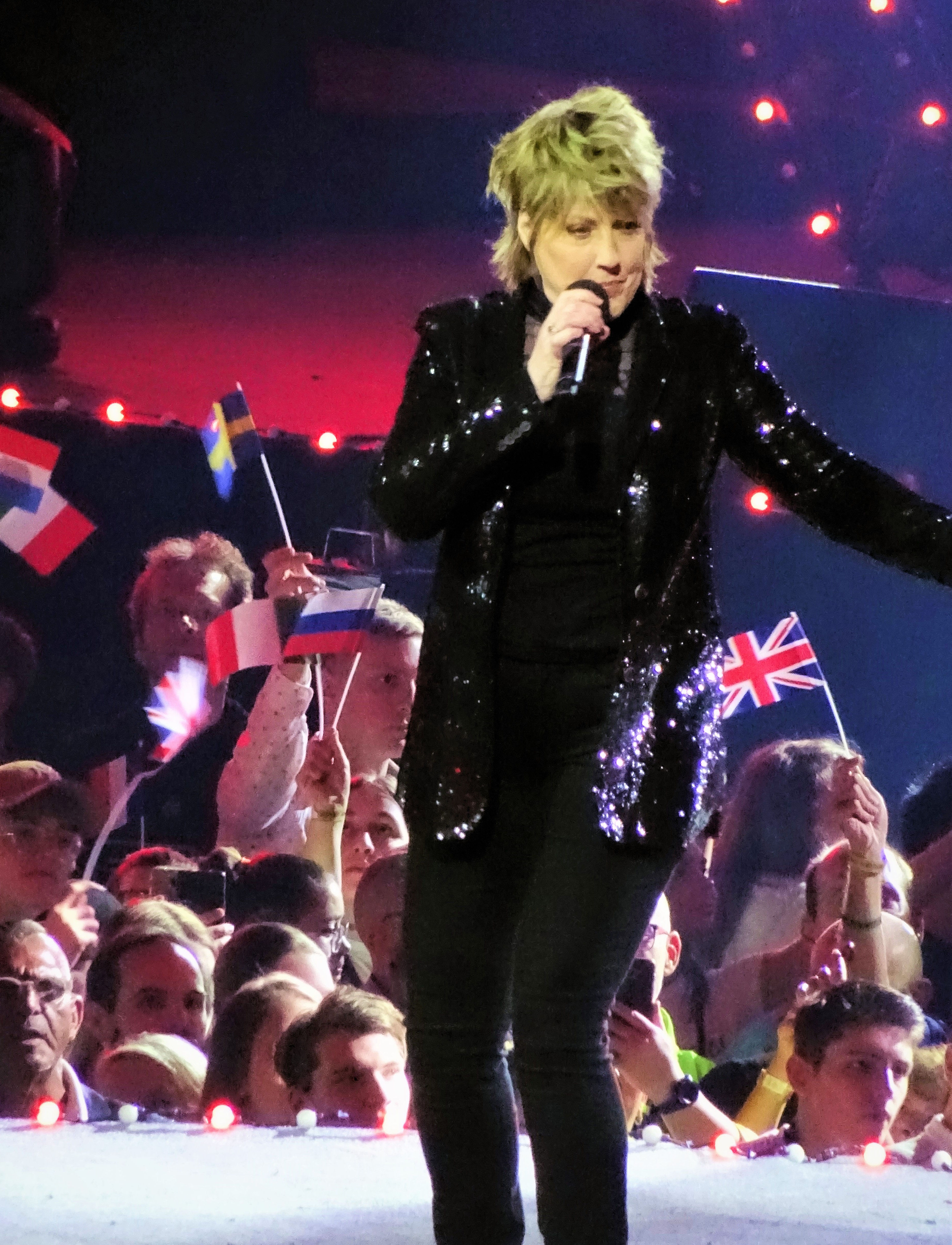
Katrina Leskanich

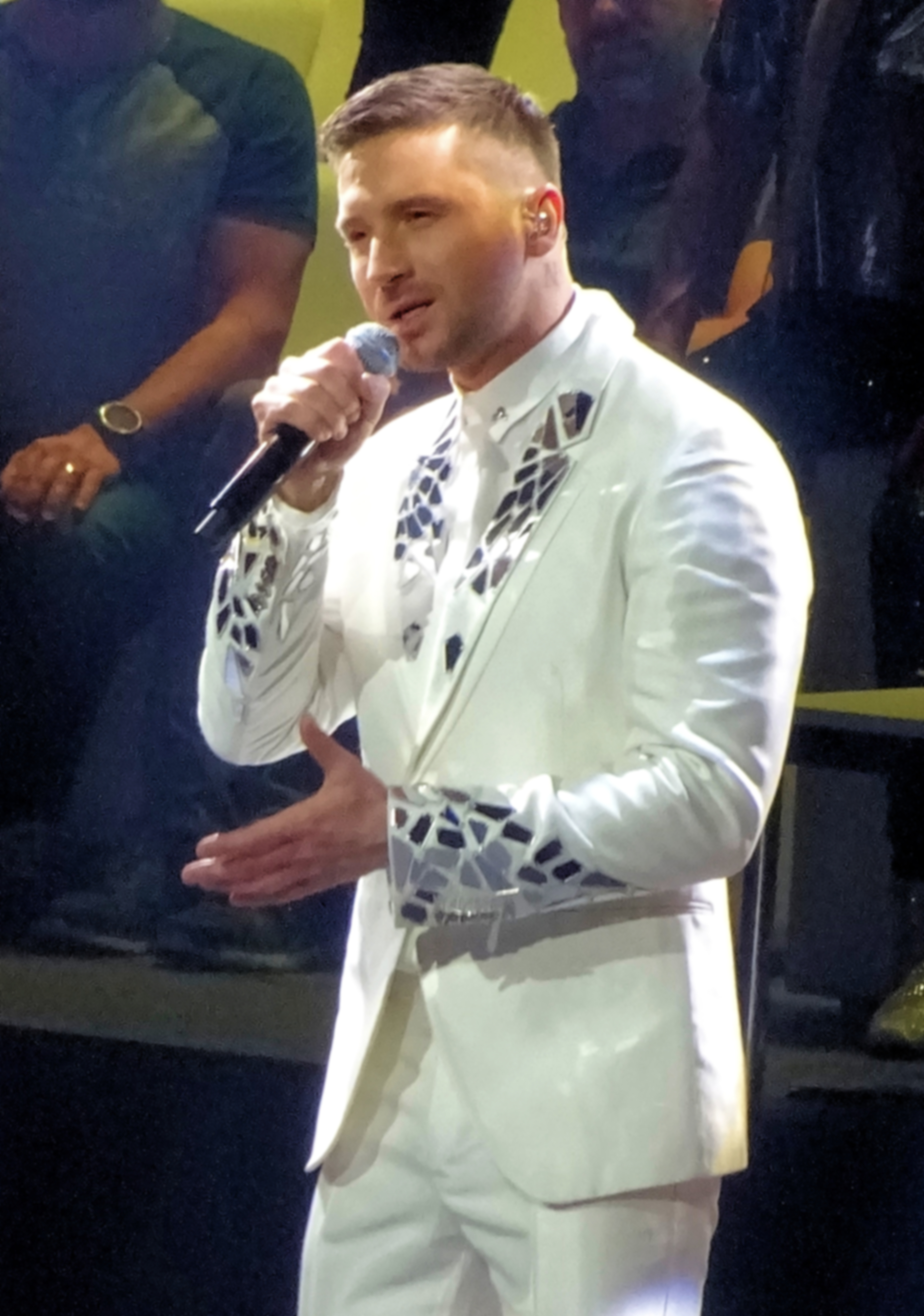
Sergey Lazarev

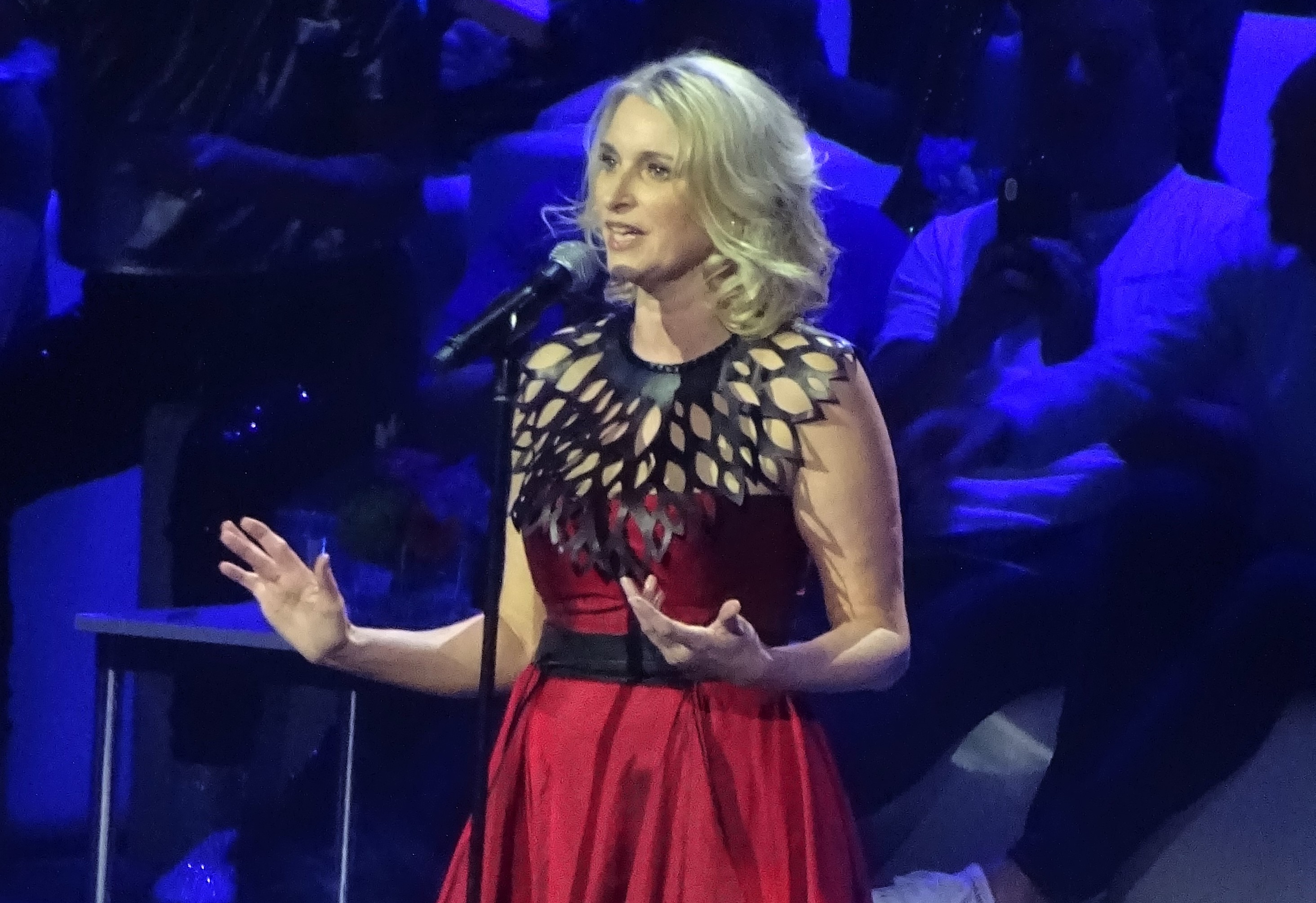
Eimear Quinn

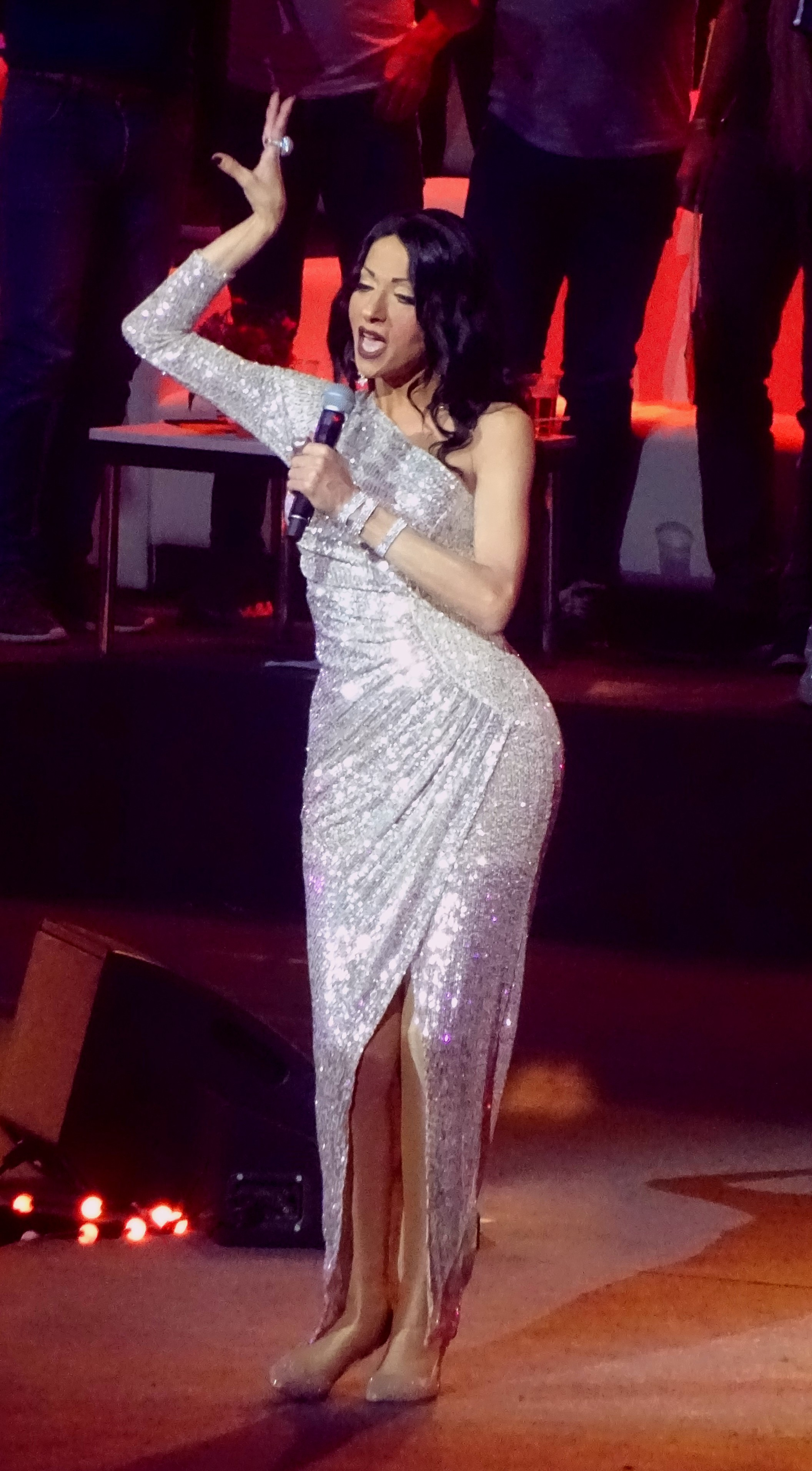
Dana International

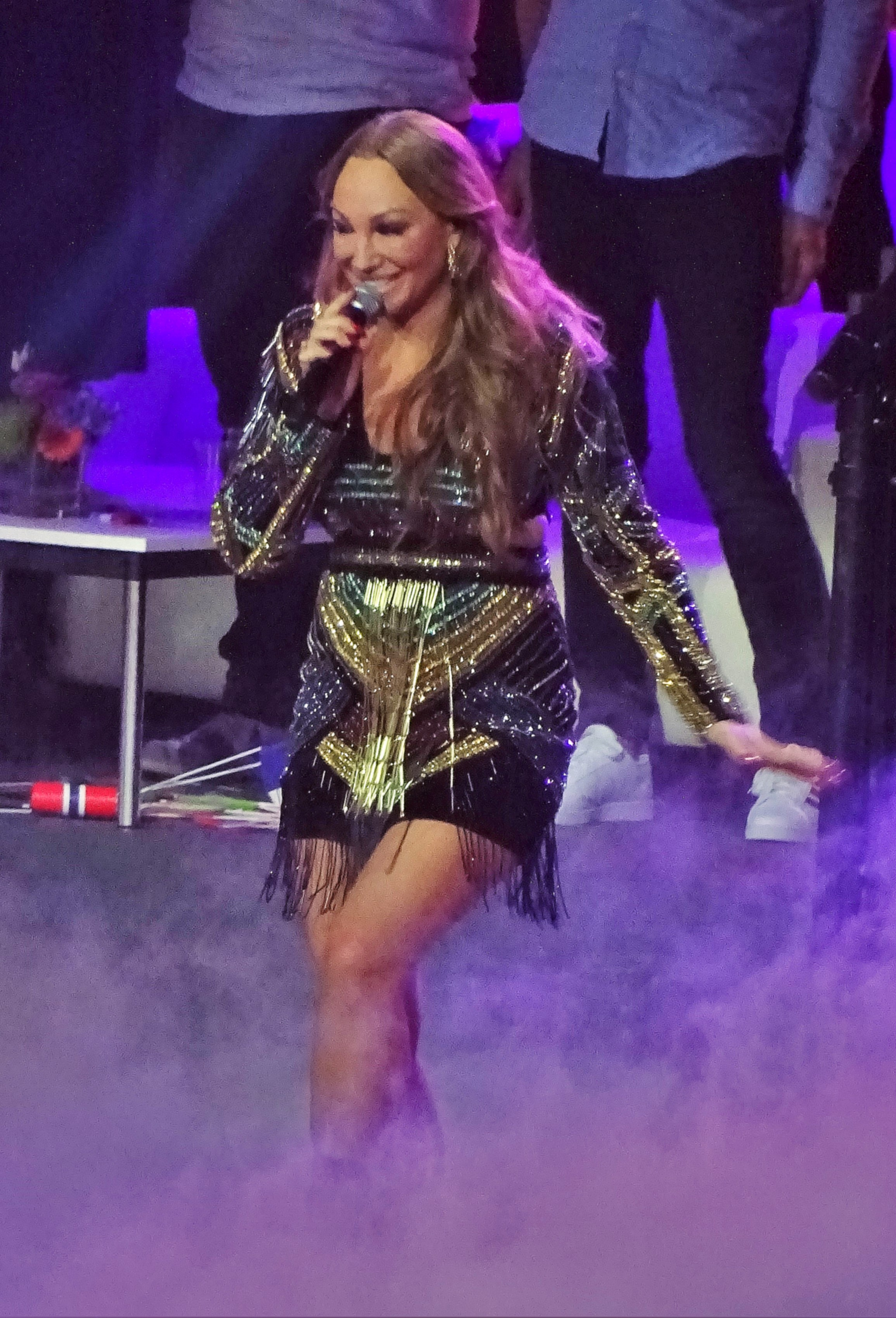
Charlotte Perrelli

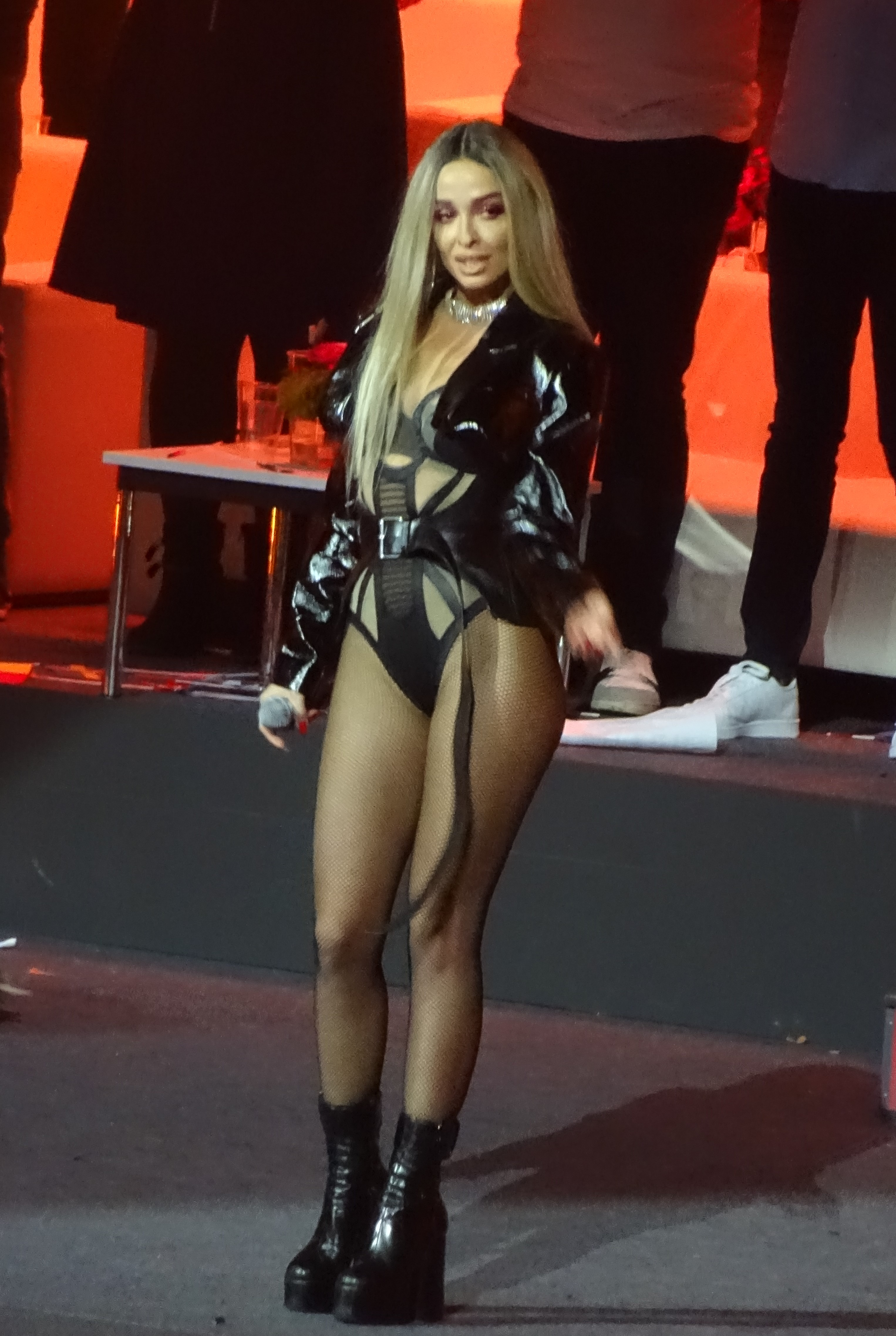
Eleni Foureira

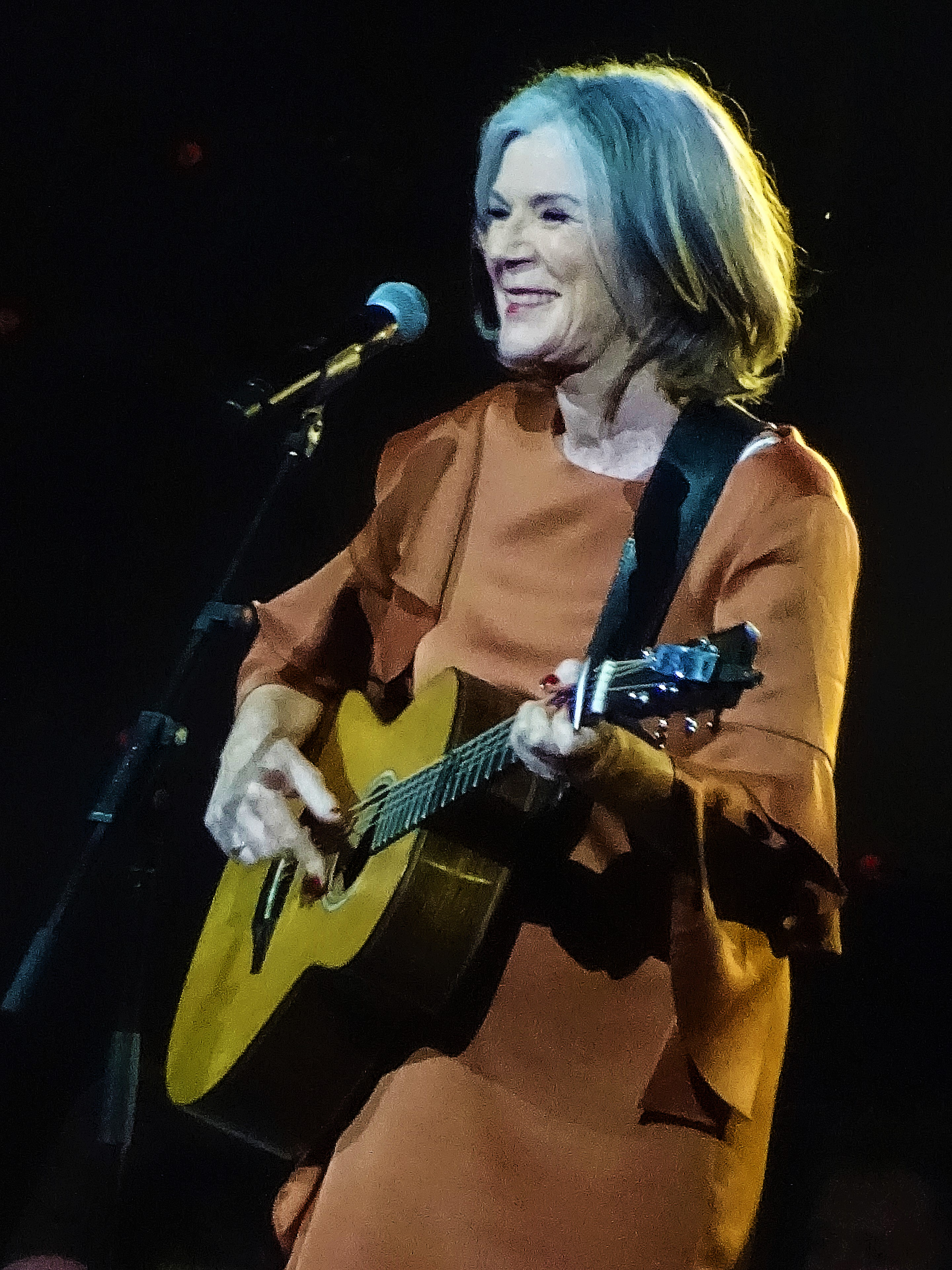
Lenny Kuhr

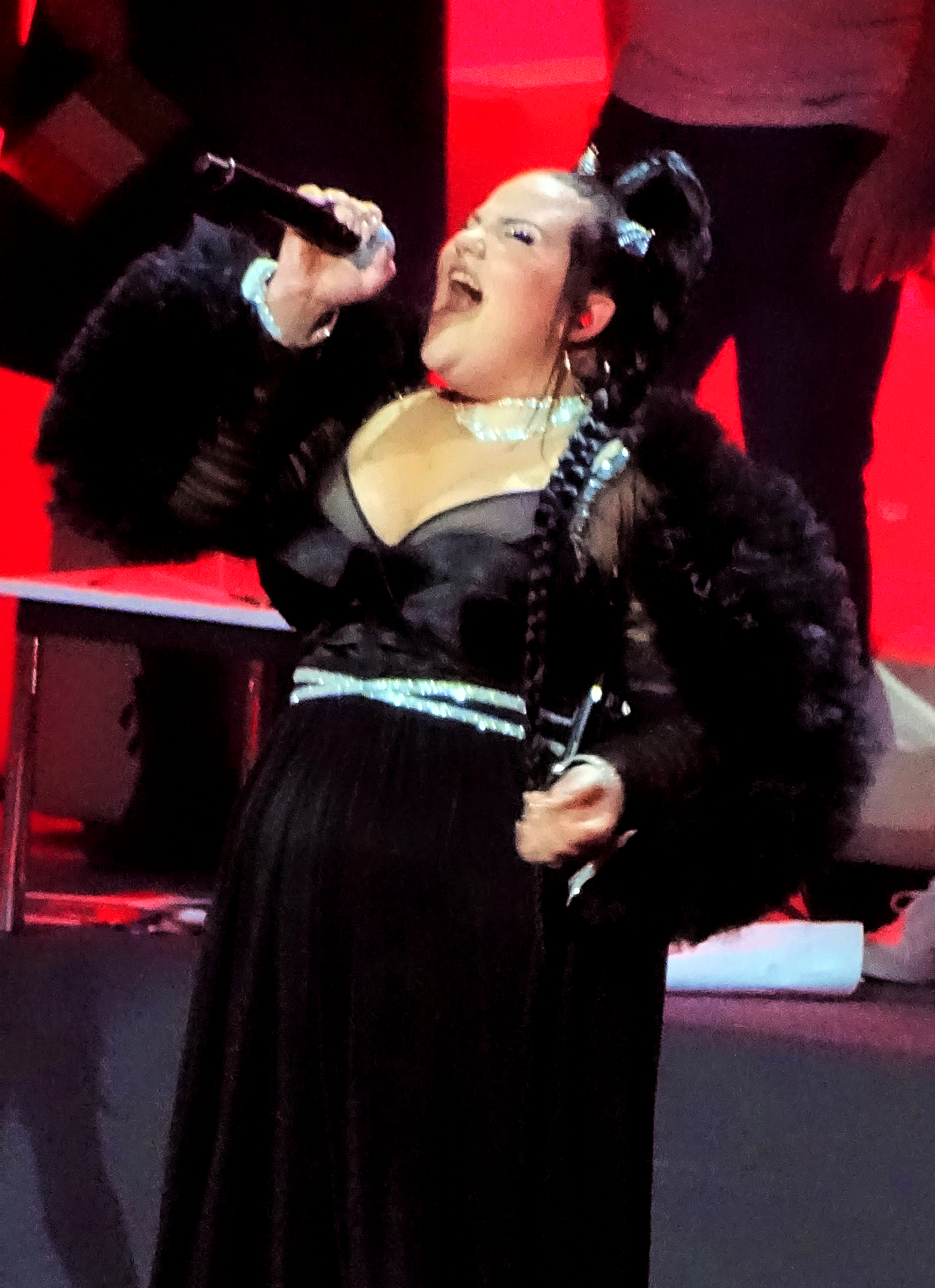
Netta

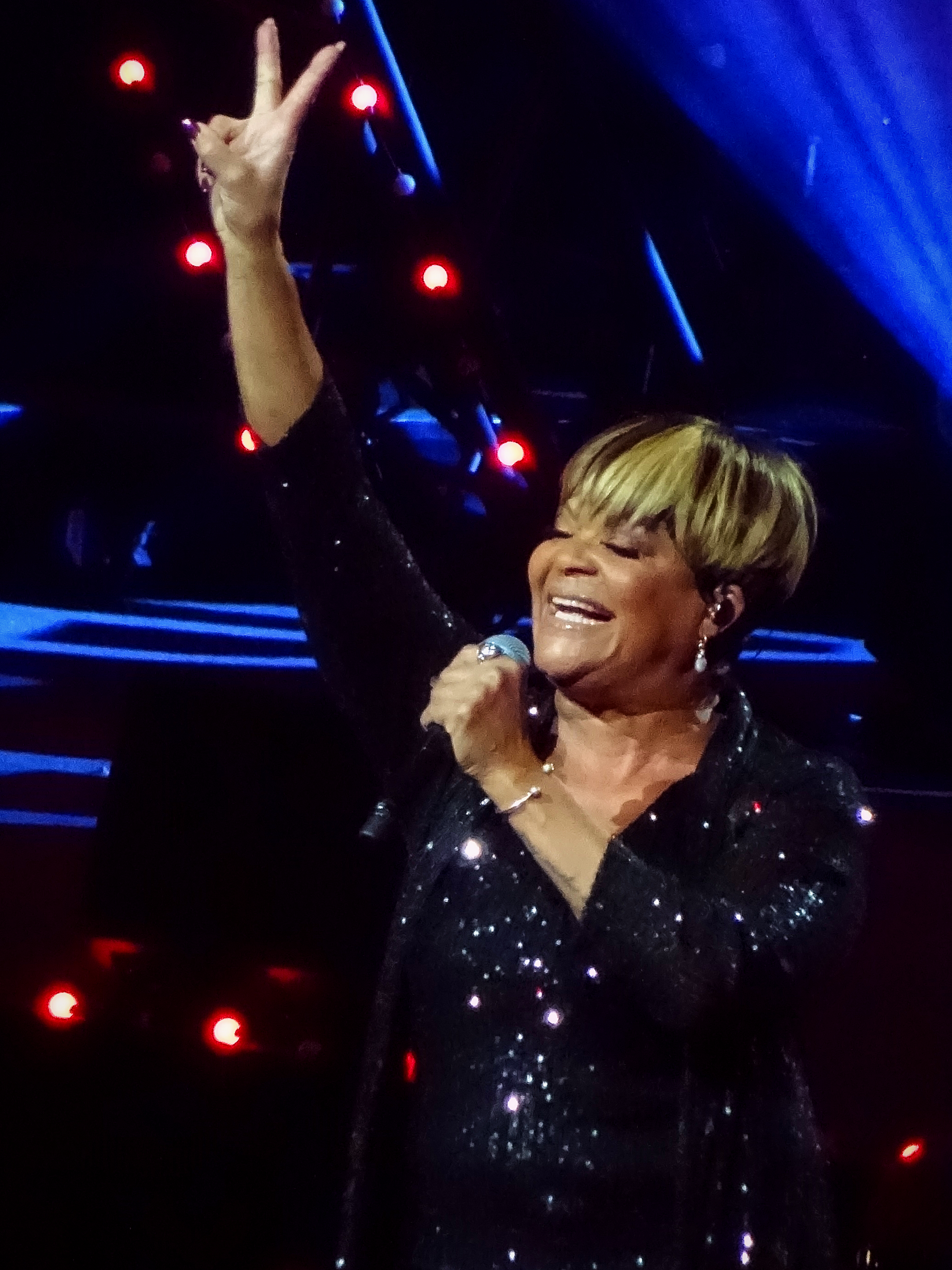
Ruth Jacott

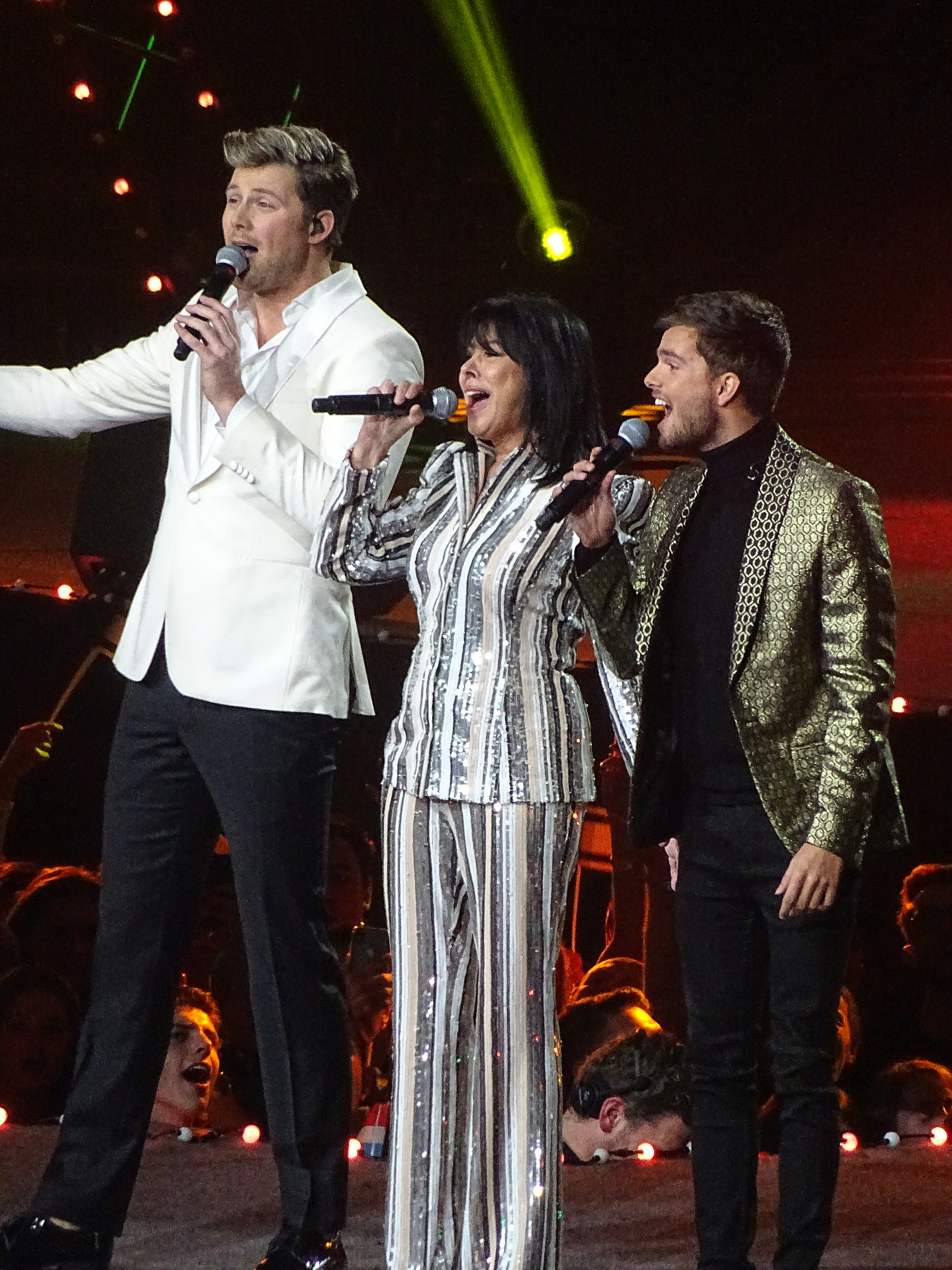
Tim Douwsma, Gali Atari and Buddy Vedder

== See also ==
- Songs of Europe
- Congratulations: 50 Years of the Eurovision Song Contest
- Eurovision Song Contest's Greatest Hits
