= Eurodab =

2025 single by Käärijä and Baby Lasagna

"#eurodab"

Single by Käärijä and Baby Lasagna
- Language: English; Finnish; Croatian
- B-side: "Cha Cha Cha"
- Released: 16 May 2025
- Genre: Hyperpop; Eurodance
- Length: 2:38
- Label: Warner Music Finland
- Songwriters: Aleksi Nurmi; Jere Pöyhönen; Johannes Naukkarinen; Joy Deb; Linnea Deb; Marko Purišić; Sonny Kylä-Liuhala
- Producers: Aleksi Nurmi; Joy Deb; Kiro

Käärijä singles chronology
"Kaistaa" (2025)	"#eurodab" (2025)	"Raveyard" (2025)

Baby Lasagna singles chronology
"Bam Bam Bira" (2025)	"#eurodab" (2025)	"Beskonačna osveta 2" (2025)

Audio
- "#eurodab" on YouTube

"#eurodab" is a song by Finnish rapper Käärijä and Croatian musician Baby Lasagna. It was released as a single by Warner Music Finland on 16 May 2025. The song was performed live a day after release, in the grand final of Eurovision Song Contest 2025.

== Background and release ==
Käärijä and Baby Lasagna rose to international prominence across Europe upon their performances at the Eurovision Song Contest. The former represented Finland at the 2023 contest with his song "Cha Cha Cha" and quickly became a fan favourite; he ultimately placed second behind Sweden. The latter represented Croatia at the 2024 contest with his song "Rim Tim Tagi Dim", which was largely compared to "Cha Cha Cha" upon release. Despite the said similarities, the song became a fan favourite as well and also placed second behind Switzerland. Despite the plagiarism accusations, Käärijä praised Baby Lasagna's entry and denied that he was plagiarized.

In mid-May 2025, a snippet of "#eurodab" appeared on TikTok. On 12 May 2025, Käärijä confirmed that the full song would be released on 16 May and that it would be a collaboration with the Croatian musician. Baby Lasagna stated that the two musicians were contacted by the 2025 contest's organizers, who were asking them to perform together, which the two used to record a collaborative song and premiere it during the said performance. The initiative came from Käärijä and his team. Upon recording the demo, he sent it to Baby Lasagna who completed his part and recorded it remotely.

== Composition ==
Described as hyperpop and Eurodance, the song nostalgically recalls the mid-2010s when dab was a global cultural phenomenon. Mixing English with the artists' native Finnish and Croatian, it is the first song with Croatian lyrics to be released under the Baby Lasagna pseudonym.

== Critical reception ==
Professional ratings
Review scores
Source	Rating
Mixer	5/10

Ruxandra Tudor of Wiwibloggs described the track as a "total banger" and its mix of languages as "one addictive mix that's high-energy and impossible to forget. It's the kind of track that gets stuck in your head after just one listen, and you won't even mind." Croatian portal Journal.hr wrote that Käärijä and Baby Lasagna "transformed [the dab] into a real Eurovision statement – visually strong, fun and irresistibly 'extra'."

Anđelo Jurkas was much harsher, dubbing the single "brainwashed, unmusical synth pounding and pummelling, where both of them babble away in their native, incomprehensible tongues while the beat underneath hammers out synthetic nonsense. And that's literally it. In the music video, they'll probably make enough goofy faces for the atonal crowd and the tone-deaf to find 'energy' in this chit-chatting 'I Wanna Oonts Oonts' moment. There isn't any. Just two guys who coo their prompt music like a kitchen-counter version of Rammstein. With no connection whatsoever to dub. Or to music, for that matter."

== Live performances ==
Eurovision 2025 performance
- "#eurodab" at the Grand Final on YouTube

On 17 May 2025, a day after the song's release, Baby Lasagna and Käärijä appeared in the grand final of Eurovision Song Contest 2025 as an interval act. They performed a mashup of their respective entries in what NME's Laura Molloy described as "a video game-esque face off", before proceeding to perform "#eurodab" for the first time. Mojmira Pastorčić of RTL Direkt dubbed the two musicians' joint performance "delirium-inducing".

== Track listing ==
Digital download/streaming

1. "#eurodab" – 2:38
2. "Cha Cha Cha" – 2:55

Digital download/streaming

1. "Cha Cha Cha / Rim Tim Tagi Dim" (Battle Mashup) – 1:55
2. "#eurodab" – 2:38

== Charts ==
Chart performance for "#eurodab"
Chart (2025)	Peak position
Croatia (Billboard)	6
Croatia International Airplay (Top lista)	3
Finland (Suomen virallinen lista)	7
Lithuania (AGATA)	92
Sweden (Sverigetopplistan)	93
UK Singles Downloads (Official Charts)	17
UK Singles Sales (OCC)	18
