= Cha Cha Cha (Käärijä song) =

2023 single by Käärijä

Single by Käärijä

from the album People's Champion
- Released: 18 January 2023
- Genre: Dance-pop; industrial metal; electronicore
- Length: 2:55
- Label: Warner Music Finland
- Songwriters: Jere Pöyhönen; Johannes Naukkarinen; Aleksi Nurmi; Jukka Sorsa

Käärijä singles chronology
"Välikuolema" (2022)	"Cha Cha Cha" (2023)	"It's Crazy, It's Party" (2023)

Music video
- "Cha Cha Cha" on YouTube

Eurovision Song Contest 2023 entry
- Country: Finland
- Artist: Käärijä
- Language: Finnish
- Composers: Johannes Naukkarinen; Aleksi Nurmi; Jukka Sorsa
- Lyricists: Jere Pöyhönen; Johannes Naukkarinen; Aleksi Nurmi; Jukka Sorsa

Finals performance
- Semi-final result: 1st
- Semi-final points: 177
- Final result: 2nd
- Final points: 526

Entry chronology
- ◄ "Jezebel" (2022)
- "No Rules!" (2024) ►

Official performance video
- "Cha Cha Cha" (First Semi-Final) on YouTube "Cha Cha Cha" (Grand Final) on YouTube

"Cha Cha Cha" is a song by Finnish rapper and singer Käärijä, released on 18 January 2023, through Warner Music Finland. The song represented Finland in the Eurovision Song Contest 2023 after winning Uuden Musiikin Kilpailu 2023, the Finnish national selection for that year's Eurovision Song Contest. "Cha Cha Cha" became a fan favourite to win the competition, topping the public vote with 376 points, scoring the all-time second-highest televote points and finishing in second place overall with 526 points.

"Cha Cha Cha" topped the charts in its native Finland, as well as in Latvia, Lithuania and Sweden. It reached the top ten in eleven other regions including Austria, Belgium, Greece, Iceland, Ireland, Israel, Norway, Switzerland, and the United Kingdom, becoming the first ever song in Finnish to reach the top ten of the UK Singles Chart. In 2024, it gained a platinum music certification in Poland.

== Background and composition ==
The song has been described as a "metal-dance-pop fusion track" by Wiwibloggs writer Oliver Adams. In an analysis of the song written by Adams, the lyrics describe someone's feelings during a night out. At first, the person in the song heads to a bar, with the intention to "free my mind of fear". After drinking several piña coladas, the person heads to the dance floor, free of fear, saying "this world ain’t making me scared no more."

In an interview with the BBC, Käärijä stated that the song was about freedom. He would compare the song to when people face problems, saying "we all have problems... when the weekend comes, people want to forget all those sad things. And many times they drink a piña colada and get the courage to go to the dance floor... I don't care what other people are thinking. Am I good dancer [sic] or not? It don't matter! And I hope other people will think the same."

== Eurovision Song Contest ==
=== Uuden Musiikin Kilpailu 2023 ===
Uuden Musiikin Kilpailu 2023 was the twelfth edition of Uuden Musiikin Kilpailu (UMK), the music competition that selects Finland's entries for the Eurovision Song Contest. The competition consisted of a final on 25 February 2023, where seven entries competed. The winner was selected by a combination of public votes (75%) and seven international jury groups from Australia, Germany, Poland, Spain, Sweden, Ukraine and the United Kingdom (25%). The viewers had a total of 882 points to award, while the juries had a total of 294 points to award. Each jury group distributed their points as follows: 2, 4, 6, 8, 10 and 12 points. The viewer vote was based on the percentage of votes each song achieved through telephone, SMS and app voting.

"Cha Cha Cha" was drawn to perform third in the final. In the days leading up to the final, the song was considered a heavy favorite to win the contest, winning polls on various Eurovision fansites. During the voting in the final, it was revealed that the song had received 72 jury points and 467 televoting points, earning a total of 539 points, winning by a margin of 387 points. As a result of its win, the song would go on to represent Finland in the Eurovision Song Contest 2023.

When asked why he believed he won, Käärijä stated that the uniqueness of both the song and the performance may have assisted in winning by a wide margin, saying "UMK has never seen a song or performance like this before... you can go far even if you are not the most skilled singer or rapper."

=== At Eurovision ===
According to Eurovision rules, all nations with the exceptions of the host country and the "Big Five" (France, Germany, Italy, Spain and the United Kingdom) are required to qualify from one of two semi-finals in order to compete for the final; the top ten countries from each semi-final progress to the final. The European Broadcasting Union (EBU) split up the competing countries into six different pots based on voting patterns from previous contests, with countries with mutually favourable voting histories put into the same pot. On 31 January 2023, an allocation draw was held, which placed each country into one of the two semi-finals, and determined which half of the show they would perform in.

Finland was placed into the first semi-final, held on 9 May 2023, and performed last in the show. The song qualified for the final held on 13 May 2023, winning the semi-final with 177 points. In the grand final, the song won the public vote with 376 points but came second overall with 526 points, short of Sweden's winning total of 583 points for Loreen's "Tattoo".

== Commercial performance ==
The song has reached the number 1 position on Spotify's Viral 50 chart, and number 7 position on its Top 50 chart. It is the first Finnish-language song to reach Spotify's global top 200, and it became Spotify's most listened Finnish-language song of all time, beating the song "Ikuinen vappu" by JVG, which held the previous record. On the UK Singles Chart, "Cha Cha Cha" debuted at number six, the first Finnish-language song ever to reach the top ten. The song reached 100 million streams on Spotify in August 2023.

== Credits and personnel ==
Credits adapted from Tidal.

- Käärijä – vocals
- Kiro – producer
- Aleksi Nurmi – producer, writer, arranger
- Jere Pöyhönen – lyricist
- Johannes Naukkarinen – writer, arranger
- Jukka Sorsa – guitar, arranger
- Kalle Keskikuru – mixing
- Svante Forsbäck – mastering

== Cover versions ==
"Cha Cha Cha" was covered by German band and fellow 2023 Eurovision entrants Lord of the Lost. A remix by Norwegian DJ Alan Walker was also released.

"Cha Cha Cha" was covered by the Turbo Youtube Channel which is known for producing Eurobeat remixes using the GUMI Vocaloid model.

Sanja Vučić, who represented Serbia in 2016 and, as part of Hurricane, in 2020 and 2021, performed "Cha Cha Cha" during the interval act of the second semifinal of Pesma za Evroviziju '24.

On 17 May 2025, Käärijä and Baby Lasagna performed a mashup of "Cha Cha Cha" and "Rim Tim Tagi Dim" in the grand final of Eurovision Song Contest 2025. They released the studio version of the mashup on 6 June 2025, with their collaborative single "#eurodab" as the B-side.

== Charts ==
=== Weekly charts ===
Weekly chart performance for "Cha Cha Cha"
Chart (2023)	Peak position
Australia Digital Tracks (ARIA)	22
Austria (Ö3 Austria Top 40)	7
Belgium (Ultratop 50 Flanders)	9
Croatia (Billboard)	2
Croatia International Airplay (Top lista)	47
Czech Republic Singles Digital (ČNS IFPI)	8
Denmark (Tracklisten)	32
Finland (Suomen virallinen lista)	1
Germany (GfK)	18
Global 200 (Billboard)	27
Greece International (IFPI)	2
Hungary (Single Top 40)	27
Iceland (Tónlistinn)	2
Ireland (IRMA)	7
Israel (Mako Hitlist)	29
Israel International Airplay (Media Forest)	5
Italy (FIMI)	85
Latvia Streaming (LaIPA)	1
Lithuania (AGATA)	1
Lithuania Airplay (TopHit)	7
Luxembourg (Billboard)	11
Netherlands (Single Top 100)	13
New Zealand Hot Singles (RMNZ)	9
Norway (VG-lista)	3
Poland (Polish Streaming Top 100)	2
Portugal (AFP)	43
Spain (PROMUSICAE)	46
Sweden (Sverigetopplistan)	1
Switzerland (Schweizer Hitparade)	8
UK Singles (Official Charts)	6
US World Digital Song Sales (Billboard)	12

Chart performance for "Cha Cha Cha (Yes Yes Remix)"
Chart (2023)	Peak position
Israel (Mako Hitlist)	42

Chart performance for "Cha Cha Cha (Alan Walker Remix)"
Chart (2023)	Peak position
Israel (Mako Hitlist)	84

=== Monthly charts ===
Monthly chart performance for "Cha Cha Cha"
Chart (2023)	Peak position
Czech Republic (Singles Digitál Top 100)	36
Lithuania Airplay (TopHit)	21

=== Year-end charts ===
Year-end chart performance for "Cha Cha Cha"
Chart (2023)	Position
Iceland (Tónlistinn)	9
Sweden (Sverigetopplistan)	25

== Certifications ==
Certifications for "Cha Cha Cha"
Region	Certification	Certified units/sales
Poland (ZPAV)	Platinum	50,000^{‡}
United Kingdom (BPI)	Silver	200,000^{‡}
^{‡} Sales+streaming figures based on certification alone.
