= Käärijä =

Finnish musician (born 1993)

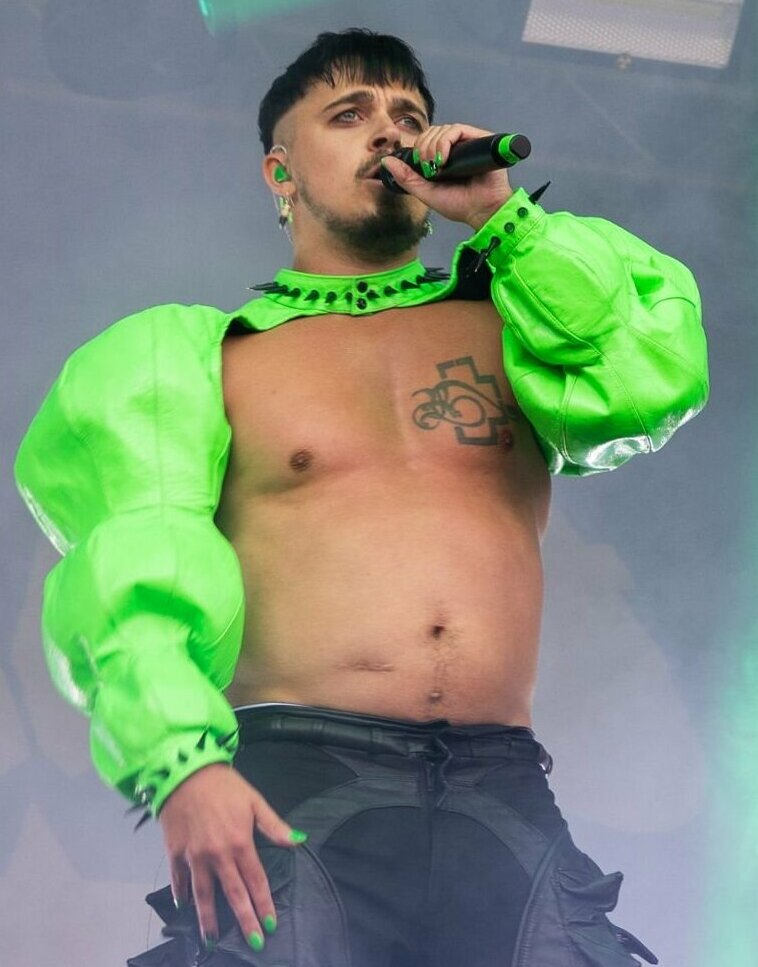
- Käärijä in June 2023

Background information
- Born: Jere Mikael Pöyhönen; 21 October 1993 (age 32); Helsinki, Finland
- Origin: Vantaa, Finland
- Genres: Pop rap; electronic; synth-pop; rap metal; punk rap
- Occupations: Rapper; singer; songwriter
- Instrument: Vocals
- Years active: 2016–present
- Labels: Monsp; Warner Music Finland

Jere Mikael Pöyhönen ([ˈjere ˈmikɑel ˈpøy̯hønen]; born 21 October 1993), known professionally as Käärijä (Finnish: [ˈkæːrijæ]), is a Finnish rapper, singer and songwriter. He represented Finland in the Eurovision Song Contest 2023 with the song "Cha Cha Cha", placing second with 526 points and finishing first in the public vote with 376. His entry topped the charts in Finland, Sweden, Latvia and Lithuania and reached the top ten in thirteen other countries, becoming the first song in Finnish to reach the top ten of the UK Singles Chart.

== Musical career ==
Pöyhönen grew up in the Ruskeasanta neighbourhood of Vantaa, Greater Helsinki, as the son of Mikko and Arja Pöyhönen. He discovered his passion for music while learning to play the drums, and started producing music in 2014. His stage name, owing to his gambling hobby, is derived from the phrase kääriä rahaa, "make a fast buck".

Pöyhönen released his music independently until 2017, when he was signed to the record label Monsp Records. He subsequently released the double single "Koppi tules" / "Nou roblem". The following year, he released an extended play, titled Peliä. In 2020, his debut album Fantastista was released.

On 11 January 2023, Pöyhönen was announced as one of seven participants in Uuden Musiikin Kilpailu 2023, the Finnish national selection for the Eurovision Song Contest 2023. His entry "Cha Cha Cha" was co-written with Aleksi Nurmi and Johannes Naukkarinen, and was released on 18 January 2023. At the national selection competition he finished in first place with a total of 539 points (467 points from the televote and 72 points from the juries), thus becoming the Finnish representative for that year's Eurovision in Liverpool.

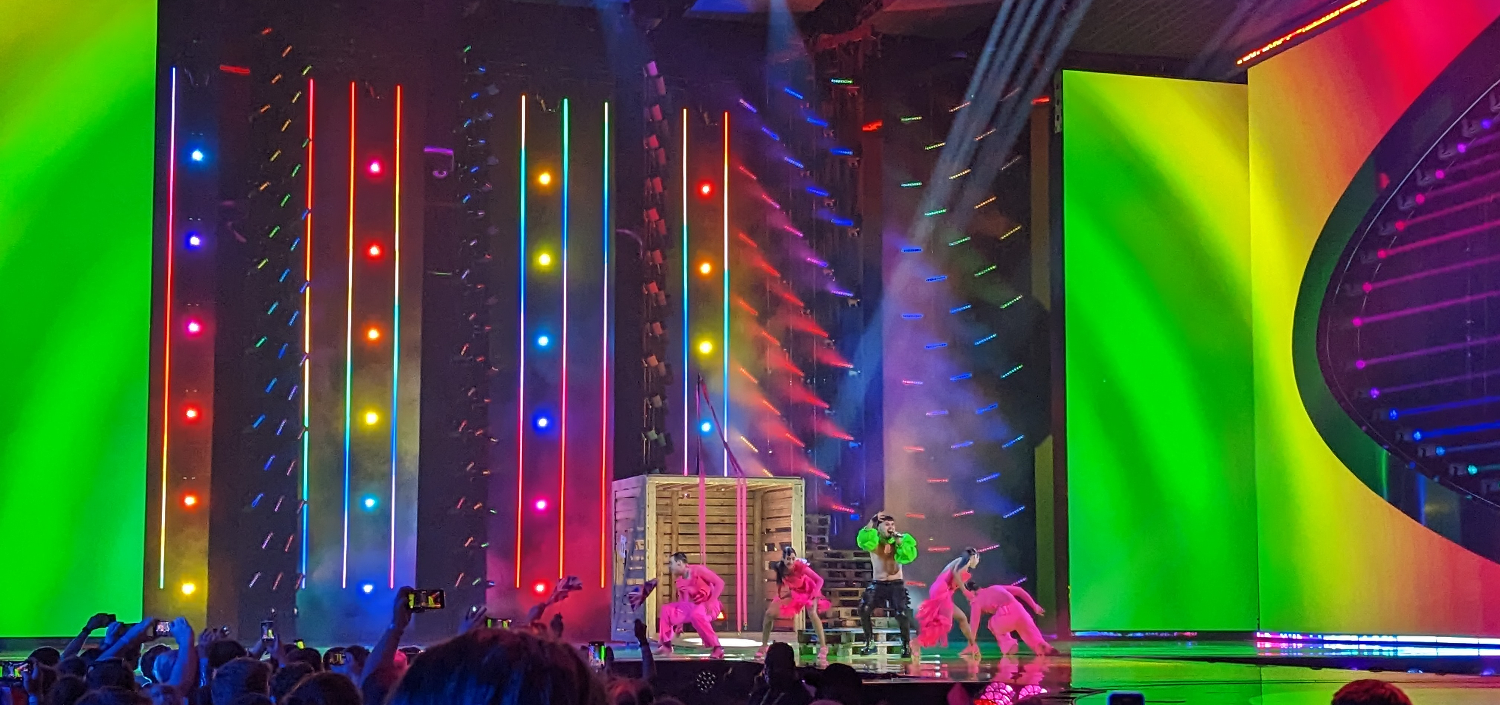
Käärijä performing "Cha Cha Cha" on stage during the first semi-final of the Eurovision Song Contest 2023 at the Liverpool Arena.

Performing in the first semi-final, held on 9 May 2023, Pöyhönen finished first with 177 points and thus qualified for the final. In the final, he topped the public vote with 376 points, but ultimately finished in second place with 526 points overall to Sweden's entrant Loreen.

Ahead of Eurovision, Finnish software company Zoan created an experience inside the popular online video game Fortnite, where players can visit a virtual rendering of Helsinki's Senate Square with Käärijä signs and stages. With the release, Finland became the first country in the world whose capital city has a photorealistic twin in Fortnite.

Käärijä was nominated at the 2023 MTV Europe Music Awards in the Best Nordic Act category, which he went on to win.

He released his second studio album, entitled People's Champion, on 1 November 2024. In 2026 he collaborated with Basshunter on "Ja eller nej". It debuted at number 12 on the Finnish singles chart.

On 23 May 2026, after his concert in Veikkaus Arena, he announced his third studio album, entitled Eurodisko , which's supposed to be released on 2 October 2026, however, he decided to release the album at a later date since he announced that his new album wasn't ready yet.

He released the EP, entitled Boyband, on 11 May 2026, with Joost Klein and Tommy Cash. Later, he released Vitun Hyvää Joulua EP with Sanni, on 10 July 2026.

== Other appearances in Eurovision ==
In Malmö 2024, Käärijä appeared during the voting session of the 2nd Semi-Final and made a playthrough of a small portion of the single "Cha Cha Cha" after a performance of Ievan polkka. He was also set to read the votes from the Finnish Jury, but withdrew on the day of the Grand Final without stating a reason; a few days later it was confirmed he withdrew due to the disqualification of Dutch entrant Joost Klein earlier that day.

In Basel 2025, Käärijä made an appearance during the interval session of the Grand Final, alongside 2024 runner-up Baby Lasagna, who had represented Croatia in Malmö. On stage, the two went head-to-head alongside various background dancers, with Käärijä performing "Cha Cha Cha" and Baby Lasagna performing "Rim Tim Tagi Dim" in a setup reminiscent of a fighting game with healthbars. After both songs completed in a mashup, the two performed their new single "#eurodab", which had been released after the 2nd Semi-Final two days prior. At the end of the performance, Käärijä briefly mentioned Joost Klein's "Europapa", which had represented the Netherlands in Malmö the previous year prior to disqualification. Additionally, Baby Lasagna wore a suit with the same color as Joost wore during his disqualified performance, and he styled his hair the same way as Joost did the previous year.

== Artistic style and influences ==
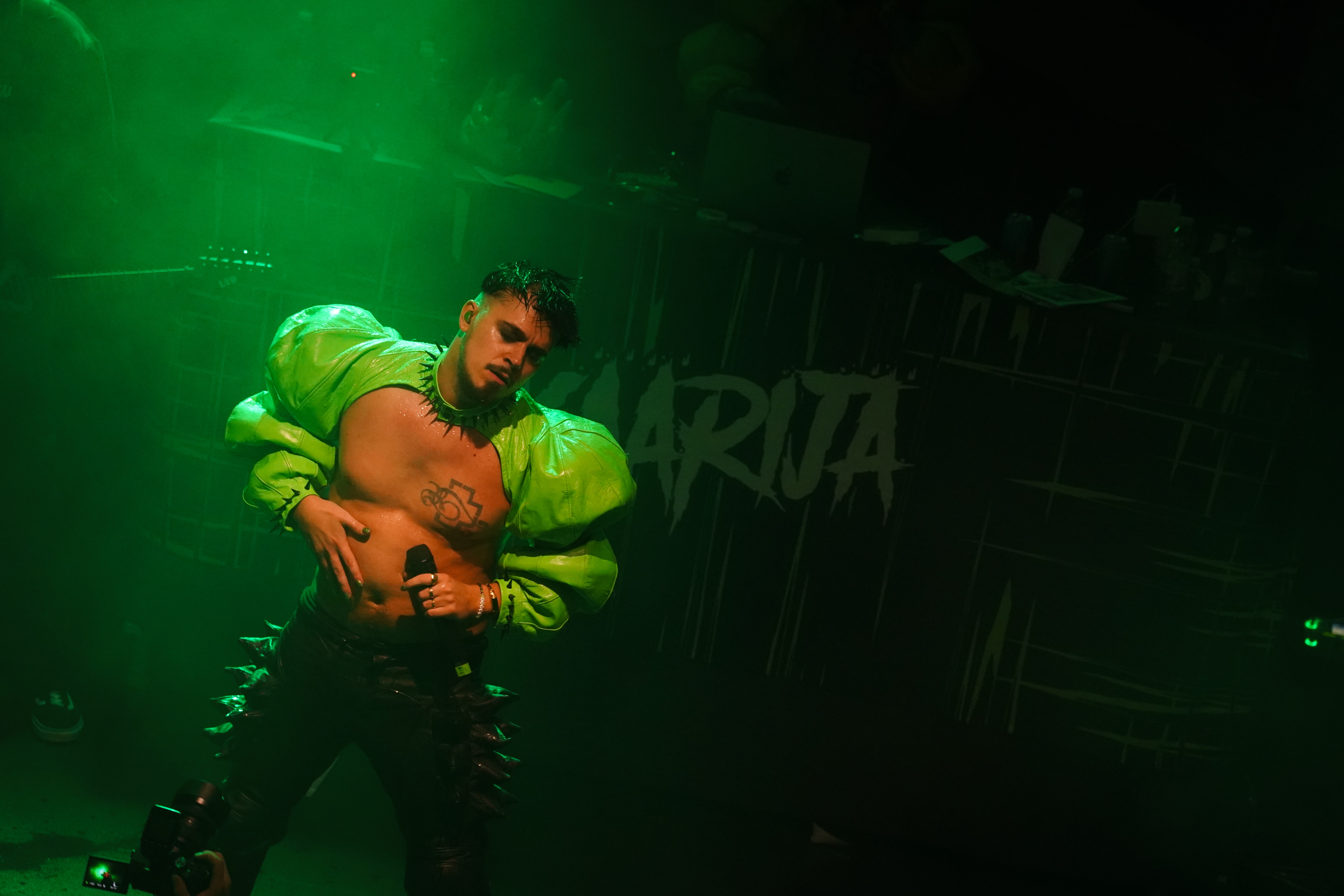
Käärijä performing in Dublin, 2023

Pöyhönen's image as Käärijä started off with a bowl cut and a yellow suit, but during performances he would get too warm, remove the suit and perform mostly shirtless, which became a part of his brand. On social media Pöyhönen uses the name "Paidaton Riehuja", which translates to "shirtless rampager", and is a reference to his punk rap song of the same title. He has expressed his belief that going topless should be acceptable regardless of body shape or size.

Pöyhönen has described Rammstein as a major influence of his, and he has a Rammstein tattoo across his chest.

Sometimes, a yellow-clad doppelgänger on rollerblades called "Häärijä" (or Paidaton Kiehuja on social media), whose real name is Tomi Häppölä, has been observed in connection with Käärijä.

In promotion for the Eurovision Song Contest 2023, the artist has used the phrase "it's crazy, it's party" to describe "Cha Cha Cha", which became an Internet meme and was adopted by his brand as a merchandise catchphrase. He went on to release a single with the same title on September 15, 2023, with Estonian rapper Tommy Cash as a feature.

== Personal life ==
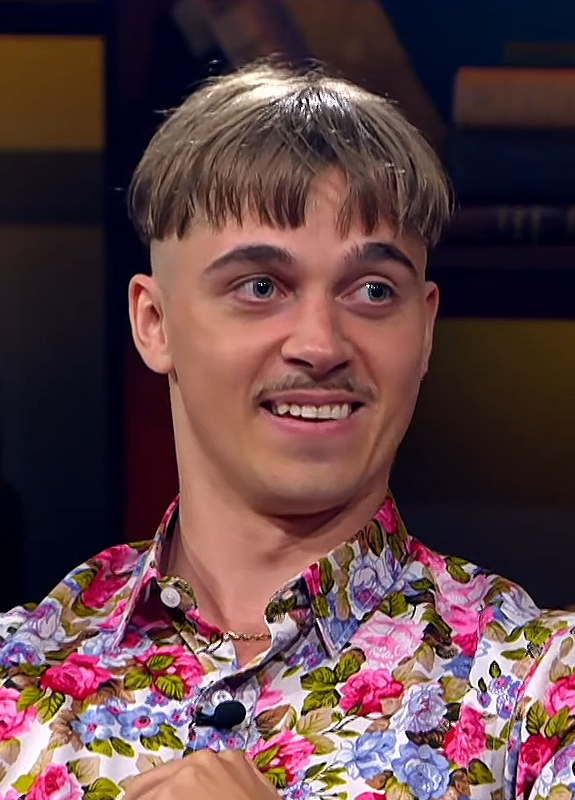
Käärijä in 2021

Pöyhönen has spoken about suffering from ulcerative colitis since his teenage years, culminating in emergency intestine removal surgery in 2014. The scar of the stoma he had to use for five months afterwards is still visible on his lower stomach. He has stated he wants to be open about his experience with the disease, to encourage others to get checked for it. Pöyhönen used to play ice hockey from 2009 to 2013, before he started his musical career.

== Discography ==
=== Studio albums ===
Title	Details	Peak chart positions
Title	Details	FIN
Fantastista	Released: 7 February 2020; Label: Warner Music Finland, Monsp; Formats: CD, LP, digital download, streaming	4
People's Champion	Released: 1 November 2024; Label: Warner Music Finland; Formats: CD, LP, digital download, streaming	2

=== Extended plays ===
Title	Details	Peak chart positions
Title	Details	FIN
Peliä	Released: 27 July 2018; Label: Warner Music Finland, Monsp; Formats: Digital download, streaming	22
Cha Cha Cha Mixtape	Released: 12 May 2023; Label: Warner Music Finland, Monsp; Formats: Digital download, streaming, CD, LP	2
Boyband (with Joost Klein and Tommy Cash)	Released: 11 May 2026; Label: Self-released; Formats: Digital download, streaming	—

=== Singles ===
Title	Year	Peak chart positions									Album or EP
Title	Year	FIN	IRE	ICE	LTU	NLD	NOR	SWE	UK	WW	Album or EP
"Heila" (featuring Urho Ghettonen)	2016	—	—	—	—	—	—	—	—	—	Non-album singles
"Urheilujätkä" (featuring Jeskiedes)	2016	—	—	—	—	—	—	—	—	—	Non-album singles
"Puun takaa"	2016	—	—	—	—	—	—	—	—	—	Non-album singles
"Tuuliviiri"	2017	—	—	—	—	—	—	—	—	—	Non-album singles
"Ajoa"	2017	—	—	—	—	—	—	—	—	—	Non-album singles
"Koppi tules"	2017	—	—	—	—	—	—	—	—	—	Non-album singles
"Nou Roblem"	2017	—	—	—	—	—	—	—	—	—	Non-album singles
"Klo23"	2018	—	—	—	—	—	—	—	—	—	Peliä
"Puuta heinää"	2018	—	—	—	—	—	—	—	—	—	Peliä
"Viulunkieli"	2018	30	—	—	—	—	—	—	—	—	Fantastista
"Rock Rock"	2019	—	—	—	—	—	—	—	—	—	Fantastista
"Hirttää kiinni"	2019	—	—	—	—	—	—	—	—	—	Fantastista
"Mic mac"	2019	44	—	—	—	—	—	—	—	—	Fantastista
"Paidaton riehuja"	2020	—	—	—	—	—	—	—	—	—	Non-album singles
"Menestynyt yksilö"	2021	—	—	—	—	—	—	—	—	—	Non-album singles
"Siitä viis"	2021	—	—	—	—	—	—	—	—	—	Non-album singles
"Välikuolema"	2022	19	—	—	—	—	—	—	—	—	Cha Cha Cha Mixtape
"Cha Cha Cha"	2023	1	7	2	1	13	3	1	6	27	Cha Cha Cha Mixtape
"It's Crazy, It's Party" (featuring Tommy Cash)	2023	4	—	—	—	—	—	—	—	—	People's Champion
"Huhhahhei"	2023	5	—	—	—	—	—	—	—	—	People's Champion
"Ruoska" (with Erika Vikman)	2024	1	—	—	—	—	—	—	—	—	People's Champion
"Kot Kot"	2024	8	—	—	—	—	—	—	—	—	People's Champion
"Trafik!" (with Joost Klein)	2024	5	—	—	60	84	—	—	—	—	Non-album single
"Sex = Money"	2024	15	—	—	—	—	—	—	—	—	People's Champion
"Autiomaa"	2024	23	—	—	—	—	—	—	—	—	People's Champion
"San Francisco Boy" (with Hooja)	2025	8	—	—	—	—	—	5	—	—	Non-album single
"Kaistaa" (with Bess)	2025	4	—	—	—	—	—	—	—	—	Ultravioletti
"#Eurodab" (with Baby Lasagna)	2025	7	—	—	92	—	—	93	—	—	Non-album single
"Raveyard" (with Lord of the Lost)	2025	—	—	—	—	—	—	—	—	—	Opvs Noir Vol. 2
"Yhtä en saa"	2025	42	—	—	—	—	—	—	—	—	Vain elämää kausi 16
"Moottoritie on kuuma"	2025	24	—	—	—	—	—	—	—	—	Vain elämää kausi 16
"Hyväuskoinen"	2025	29	—	—	—	—	—	—	—	—	Vain elämää kausi 16
"Aamuun asti"	2025	—	—	—	—	—	—	—	—	—	Vain elämää kausi 16
"Vantaalainen"	2025	6	—	—	—	—	—	—	—	—	Vain elämää kausi 16
"Menoo (Get On)"	2025	49	—	—	—	—	—	—	—	—	Vain elämää kausi 16
"Disko Balls"	2025	17	—	—	—	—	—	—	—	—	Non-album singles
"Ja eller nej" (with Basshunter)	2026	12	—	—	—	—	—	—	—	—	Non-album singles
"Booty Call" (with Sanni)	2026	25	—	—	—	—	—	—	—	—	Non-album singles
"Hyvää puuta" (with Joost Klein)	2026	35	—	—	—	—	—	—	—	—	Non-album singles
"—" denotes a recording that did not chart or was not released in that territory.

== Awards and nominations ==
Year	Ceremony	Category	Work	Result
2023	MTV Europe Music Awards	Best Nordic Act	Himself	Won
2024	Berlin Music Video Awards	Best Trashy	"It's Crazy, It's Party" (feat. Tommy Cash)	Nominated

Awards and achievements
Preceded by The Rasmus with "Jezebel"	Finland in the Eurovision Song Contest; 2023	Succeeded by Windows95man with "No Rules!"
