= Rim Tim Tagi Dim =

2024 song by Baby Lasagna

Single by Baby Lasagna

from the album DMNS & Mosquitoes
- Released: 12 January 2024
- Genre: Industrial metal; synth-pop; techno
- Length: 2:59
- Label: Virgin
- Composer: Marko Purišić
- Lyricist: Marko Purišić
- Producer: Baby Lasagna

Baby Lasagna singles chronology
"Don't Hate Yourself, but Don't Love Yourself Too Much" (2023)	"Rim Tim Tagi Dim" (2024)	"And I" (2024)

Music video
- "Rim Tim Tagi Dim" on YouTube

Dora performances
- "Rim Tim Tagi Dim" (Second Semi-final) on YouTube; "Rim Tim Tagi Dim" (Final) on YouTube; "Rim Tim Tagi Dim" (Winner's Performance) on YouTube

Eurovision Song Contest 2024 entry
- Country: Croatia
- Language: English

Finals performance
- Semi-final result: 1st
- Semi-final points: 177
- Final result: 2nd
- Final points: 547

Entry chronology
- ◄ "Mama ŠČ!" (2023)
- "Poison Cake" (2025) ►

Official performance video
- "Rim Tim Tagi Dim" (First Semi-final) on YouTube; "Rim Tim Tagi Dim" (Grand Final) on YouTube

"Rim Tim Tagi Dim" is a song written and performed by Croatian musician Marko Purišić, better known as Baby Lasagna. It was released on 12 January 2024 through Virgin Music Group as the third single from Baby Lasagna's debut solo album, DMNS & Mosquitoes (2025). Self-described as a humorous song about the economic emigration of young Croatians, it represented Croatia at the Eurovision Song Contest 2024, where it finished runner-up with 547 points. The result marked Croatia's best ever finish in the competition.

The song was met with widespread praise in both Croatian and international outlets, drawing praise for its musical style, its message, and for how the message of the song was presented. The performance of "Rim Tim Tagi Dim" was also well-received, earning praise from past Croatian Eurovision representatives. As a result, the song became a favourite to win the contest. "Rim Tim Tagi Dim" enjoyed commercial success, peaking at number one in its native country of Croatia, and peaking within the top ten in an additional five other countries. It also received numerous accolades, including a Marcel Bezençon Award and an OGAE Poll victory.

== Background and composition ==
"Rim Tim Tagi Dim" was written and composed solely by Marko Purišić. According to him, the song was written by himself in his bedroom, and was inspired by an opportunity he had to take a job on a cruise ship that he refused. It was originally meant to be a filler song for his debut album, DMNS & Mosquitoes (2025), but realized the potential of the song after it surged in streams and later decided to enter the song into Dora 2024. The song was officially announced as a reserve song for Croatia's national final for the Eurovision Song Contest 2024, Dora 2024, on 2 January 2024 to serve as a backup if any entry in the main lineup withdrew, which happened the following day.

In numerous interviews, he stated that the song was inspired by a mass exodus of young adults leaving Croatia for better opportunities in foreign countries. To Purišić, the song is a "humorous and light hearted approach" to the issue. The song itself tells a story of a young, rural man who leaves his village for a better life in a foreign country; although excited, he is still wracked by anxiety over moving. Purišić was also inspired by his own anxiety. In the song lyrics, 'rim tim tagi dim' serves as the name of a fictional folk dance of the narrator's native village. Sonically, "Rim Tim Tagi Dim" merges elements of techno, heavy metal, pop and trap; Matilda Källén of Dagens Nyheter described it as "some kind of pop-punk with elements of techno and metal". It is based on a sample taken from the Sounds of KSHMR Vol. 2 Splice pack.

== Critical reception ==
=== Croatian media ===
"Rim Tim Tagi Dim" has been largely well received. When Večernji list's Hrvoje Horvat dubbed the song the worst one at Dora and compared it to the works of Dead or Alive, the comment was condemned by Index.hr writer Josip Bošnjak. The song was also compared to Käärijä's "Cha Cha Cha" and Pain's "Party in My Head"; in response, Purišić expressed admiration for the former artist. Käärijä himself later praised the song, dubbing it "crazy". Writing for Index.hr, Martina Radoš called on Croatian Radiotelevision (HRT) to fire those who placed Purišić among the reserves. In an article for the same publication, Bošnjak wrote: "It's an unusual musical oxymoron. Sad everyday life in a cheerful Istrian tone." The song was praised by Croatian artists Matko Jelavić, Zorica Kondža, and Zdenka Kovačiček, along with journalist Vedrana Rudan.

=== Eurovision-related and other media ===
In reactions by Wiwibloggs' William Lee Adams and Cinan, the two praised the song for its composition and lyrics. Adams stated in response to the song's composition, "nothing here feels sort of forced, cheesy, or generic; it feels sincere... this is quality. It just feels like a sincere rock song." Markus Larsson of Aftonbladet described the song as a "hard-to-digest but effective mix of Rammstein and Sean Banan" and pointed out its likely victory at Eurovision. Hanna Fahl of Dagens Nyheter evoked some of Larsson's sentiment, writing: "A schlagerfied Rammstein for cat lovers and anxiety sufferers – it's both lovable and troll-friendly in all its simple silliness." NPR's Glen Weldon acknowledged the song as a favourite to win the competition, praising the combination of the song's message and musical style, calling it a "narrative turducken". Roisin O'Connor from The Independent included the song on their list of ten potential favourites to win the contest, writing, "the staging for this is also nuts... Perfect Eurovision fodder, and very entertaining!"

In a Wiwibloggs review containing several reviews from several critics, the song was rated 8.5 out of 10 points, earning second out of the 37 songs competing in the Eurovision Song Contest 2024 on the site's annual ranking. Another review conducted by ESC Bubble that contained reviews from a combination of readers and juries rated the song first out of the 15 songs "Rim Tim Tagi Dim" was competing against in its the Eurovision semi-final. Jon O'Brien of Vulture ranked the song as 12th overall, dubbing it "essentially a piece of socioeconomic commentary". He credited its "infectious rhythmic verses and slightly deranged leap from Balkan techno to headbanging emo" for Purišić's status of a Eurovision favourite. ESC Beat's Doron Lahav also ranked the song 12th overall, stating that while he believed the song would be remembered by listeners, he acknowledged Purišić's inconsistent live vocals during performances. The Scotsman writer Erin Adam gave the song a heavily positive review, rating the song 10 points out of 10 and stating that the song was her personal winner.

=== Betting odds ===
Shortly after "Rim Tim Tagi Dim" won Dora 2024, the song was listed on 29 February 2024 as the overall favourite to win the competition, at 4.82-to-1 odds. By 10 March, although Purišić still remained the favourite, his odds had slightly decreased. 12 days later, his odds decreased to the lowest a Croatian entry had ever been placed. After Pre-Party ES, on 1 April, the song fell to second place in the betting odds, falling behind Switzerland's Nemo and their song, "The Code". After rehearsals, the song still remained in second place. However, after the semi-finals, the song was listed once again as the overall favourite to win the contest.

== Music video and promotion ==
An accompanying music video for the song was released on 20 February 2024. The video was directed by Purišić's partner, Elizabeta Ružić, and filmed in her native Kaštelir-Labinci. According to a Jutarnji list review, the music video features a rural man, surrounded by fellow rural residents and farm animals, emigrating out of Croatia in search of a better life. In the video, the rural man displays that, while excited to move out of his rural lifestyle, he is still overtaken by anxiety and fear.

=== Promotion ===
The song's victory at Dora sparked a TikTok trend that saw users recreating a part of the choreography. Those who took part in the trend include Croatian members of the European Parliament Valter Flego, Biljana Borzan and Predrag Matić; Jasenka Auguštan-Pentek, the mayor of Zlatar, and Nathalie Rayes, the U.S. Ambassador to Croatia. On 9 March 2024, Purišić visited the International Cat Show, organized in Zagreb by the Association of Croatian Felinological Societies (SFDH) as a result of one of the song's lyrics about a cat meowing gaining popularity.

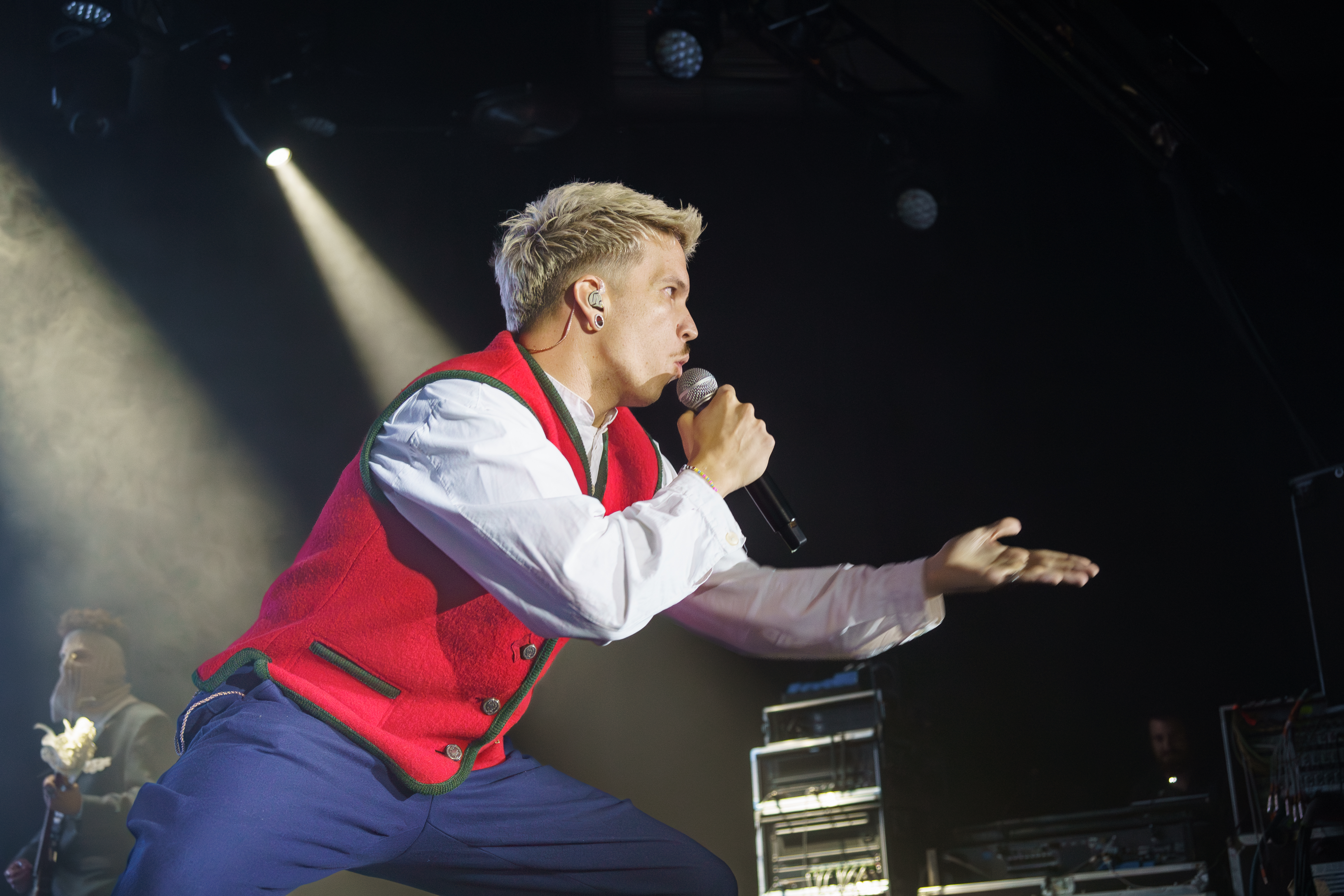
Purišić performing "Rim Tim Tagi Dim" at Pre-Party ES. He embarked on a promotional tour in order to promote the song.

On 22 March, Purišić performed the song at the 30th Večernjak's Rose Awards. To further promote the song, Purišić announced his participation in various Eurovision pre-parties, including Amsterdam's Eurovision in Concert, Madrid's Pre-Party ES, and the London Eurovision Party. During his visit to the Netherlands, Purišić also performed the song on Beau, a Dutch talk-show series, on 12 April. On 21 April, Purišić performed the song on the Slovenian TV show Nedeljsko popoldne.

On 8 April, HRT invited fans across the country to a public dance event where they would get filmed dancing to the song in order to show support to Purišić. The event, which was taped by HRT for television and social media, took place on 13 April in five Croatian cities: Zagreb, Split, Osijek, Zadar and Umag. Nearly 150 dancers choreographed their performance for the filming in Umag, with Luana Kličić and Sebastijan Žeželić, Purišić's backup dancers for Malmö, joining the event as well. On the same day, HRT published photos and videos of the fans dancing, which also aired on Dnevnik, HRT's central news program. On 16 April, HRT released a music video titled "Hrvatska pleše 'Rim Tim Tagi Dim'" (transl. Croatia Dancing to "Rim Tim Tagi Dim"). The video compiled the footage of fans dancing at the five events, as well as several other recordings submitted to HRT by the fans, among which were videos made by the employees of Croatian Post, members of Zagreb's Croatian National Theatre and its Ballet Department, Zagreb's Fire Department, Croatia's Ministry of the Interior and its Police Academy members, and several tourist boards across Croatia.

== Eurovision Song Contest ==
=== Dora 2024 ===
HRT, Croatia's broadcaster, organized a 24-entry competition, Dora 2024, to select Croatia's representative for the Eurovision Song Contest 2024. The competition consisted of two 12-song semi-finals that culminated into a grand final, with eight songs qualifying from each semi-final. In the final, the winner was selected from a 50/50 combination of votes from the public and a jury that consisted from international and local Croatian juries.

Purišić was announced on 2 January as a reserve entry in the case of anyone in the main lineup's withdrawal. The following day, Zsa Zsa withdrew from the competition, with Purišić taking her spot. It was drawn to perform seventh in the second semi-final, which took place on 23 February. The performance was choreographed by Luana Kličić and Sebastijan Žeželić, who also took part in it as backing dancers, as well as Purišić's brother Martin who played the drums. It featured Croatian folk elements such as lace, headscarfs, and a washboard, with Purišić wearing a Valentina Pliško-designed costume consisting of a black leather vest, a shirt made of silver rings, faded black jeans with a pink twine, and white baggy sleeves inspired by the Croatian traditional clothing. The sleeves were compared to those worn by Käärijä at the Eurovision Song Contest 2023. The performance also featured a suitcase, symbolizing emigration, and neon farm animals on the LED backdrop.

The song managed to qualify for the grand final, and was later drawn to perform 14th. Purišić performed a repeat of his semi-final performance. Upon the announcement of the voting results in the grand final on 25 February, the song was revealed to have won the competition, winning both the jury and televote with a combined total of 321 points, 239 more than Vinko Ćemeraš' "Lying Eyes", the runner-up. He also won 247 points from televote, 220 more than Alen Đuras' "A Tamburitza Lullaby", the televote runner-up; all other entries earned 218 points from televote combined. As a result, the song won the right to represent Croatia in the Eurovision Song Contest 2024.

=== At Eurovision ===
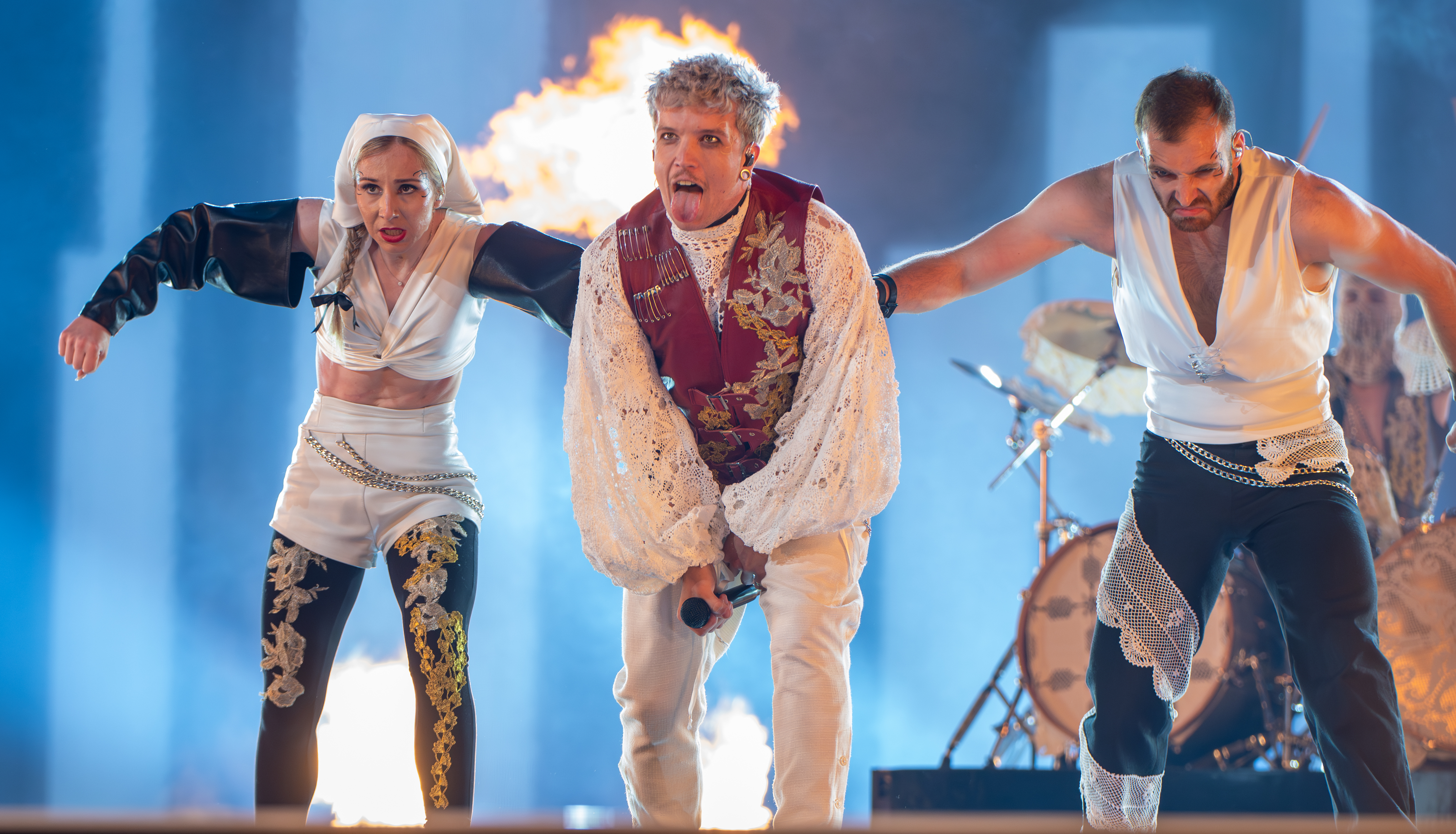
Kličić, Purišić and Žeželić (left to right) during a rehearsal before the first semi-final

The Eurovision Song Contest 2024 took place at the Malmö Arena in Malmö, Sweden, and consisted of two semi-finals held on the respective dates of 7 and 9 May and the final on 11 May 2024. During the allocation draw on 30 January 2024, Croatia was drawn to compete in the first semi-final, performing in the first half of the show. He was later drawn to perform seventh in the semi-final, after Poland's Luna and before Iceland's Hera Björk.

Purišić's performance at Eurovision featured certain modifications compared to the one from Dora: Pliško created new costumes more heavily inspired by the traditional clothing, as well as masks for the dancers inspired by Istrian čentrini. Martin Purišić was replaced by Matija Klaj on the drums. Purišić's costume consisted of white shirt and trousers made of lace, as well as a red vest with golden and silver details. The outfit was rounded off with a choker, black boots and a tousled hairdo. The performance also featured a backdrop of dancing LED cats. At the end of his semi-final performance, Purišić winked at the audience and meowed, which Zadovoljna.hr interpreted as a reference to his one-eyed cat Stipe. The performance drew positive reactions from previous Croatian Eurovision participants, including the 2017 representative Jacques Houdek and the 2023 representatives Let 3. "Rim Tim Tagi Dim" won the semi-final, scoring 177 points and securing a position in the grand final.

Purišić performed a repeat of his performance in the grand final on 11 May. The song was performed 23rd, ahead of Slovenia's Raiven and before Georgia's Nutsa Buzaladze. After the results were announced, he finished second with 547 points, with a split score of 210 points from the juries and 337 points from public televoting. Regarding the former, the song received two sets of the maximum 12 points from Cyprus and Serbia. It also managed to receive nine additional sets of 12 points from the public televote, winning the televote in the process. The result was Croatia's highest ever finish in the contest. In response to his finish, Purišić expressed contentment, stating that he was "surprised how happy I am... We didn't fake anything, everything was done exactly as we imagined, as it should have been."

=== Aftermath ===
On 12 May, the day after the final, Purišić arrived from Malmö to Zagreb, where he was welcomed by a crowd of fans and his parents at the Zagreb Airport. He was then taken to the Ban Jelačić Square by a panoramic bus. At the square, he was welcomed by thousands of fans, to whom he expressed his gratitude and broke down in tears. He then performed "Rim Tim Tagi Dim" two times in a row. Prior to his arrival, the crowd at the square was entertained by performances from Emilija Kokić (Yugoslavia 1989), Tajči (Yugoslavia 1990) and Let 3 (Croatia 2023). Those who welcomed Purišić at the square also included the Mayor of Zagreb Tomislav Tomašević and the Prime Minister Andrej Plenković. On 16 May, Plenković revealed that the Government would reward Purišić with €50,000 for his success; Purišić, however, refused to accept the money and asked that €25,000 each be donated to two hospitals that he himself had chosen. On 19 May, Purišić was announced as the winner of the You're a Vision Award.

Purišić's success at Eurovision became a cultural phenomenon in Croatia. He was shown support by RTL Vijesti, the Croatian National Tourist Board, Croatia Airlines and the Croatian Football Federation. In an op-ed for Agroklub, Leticija Hrenković wondered if "Rim Tim Tagi Dim" could change the attitude of the average Croatian towards the rural. Večernji list's Ana Hajduk and Gloria's Ana Strizić credited Purišić for restoring the popularity of lace.

== Commercial performance ==
Prior to Dora, "Rim Tim Tagi Dim" debuted at number 24 on the HR Top 40 issue dated 14 January 2024, before peaking at number four the following week. Following its triumph at Dora, it reached the new peak of number one on the chart issue dated 3 March 2024. It also debuted at number two on Billboard's Croatia Songs chart issue dated 9 March 2024, behind "Fantazija" by Grše and Miach. On the chart issue dated 25 May 2024, it ended "Fantazija"'s 15-week reign and reached the chart summit.

On the UK Singles Chart issue dated 17 May 2024, "Rim Tim Tagi Dim" debuted at number 36. The achievement made Purišić only the second Croatian artist to appear on the chart, after Ivo Robić who peaked at number 23 with "Morgen" (1959). Other territories where the song reached top 40 include Austria, Finland, Greece, Iceland, Ireland, Latvia, Lithuania, Luxembourg, Norway, Poland, Sweden, and Switzerland.

Globally, the song debuted at 139 and 64 on Billboard Global 200 and Global Excl. US chart issues dated 25 May 2024, respectively.

== Cover versions ==
On 26 February 2024, a day after the Dora final, Vatrogasci released their Croatian-language parody cover of "Rim Tim Tagi Dim", titled "Rim Tu Tiki Tiki".

On 5 May 2024, the weekend before the Eurovision week, Croatian actress Marija Kolb impersonated Purišić's Dora performance in the tenth episode of the eighth season of Tvoje lice zvuči poznato, winning the episode. Her performance was endorsed by Purišić.

On 12 May 2025, Purišić performed an acoustic version of "Rim Tim Tagi Dim" in the morning programme of Otvoreni Radio. The version was described as country by multiple publications. Five days later, on 17 May, Purišić and Käärijä performed a mashup of "Rim Tim Tagi Dim" and "Cha Cha Cha" in the grand final of Eurovision Song Contest 2025.

On 13 April 2026, Moldovan entry for 2026, Satoshi, performed a cover of "Rim Tim Tagi Dim", which was then uploaded to the Eurovision YouTube channel in the run-up to the 2026 edition and features Baby Lasagna at the ending.

== Awards and nominations ==
Awards and nominations for "Rim Tim Tagi Dim"
Year	Award	Category	Result	Ref.
2024	Cesarica Awards	Hit Song of January	Won	
2024	Marcel Bezençon Awards	Press Award	Won	
2024	OGAE	OGAE Poll	First place	
2024	OUTmusic Awards	Eurovision Song of the Year	Third place	
2024	Eurovision Awards	Best Music Video	Won	
2025	Zlatni Studio Awards	Song of the Year	Won	

== Charts ==
=== Weekly charts ===
Chart performance for "Rim Tim Tagi Dim"
Chart (2024)	Peak position
Australia Digital Tracks (ARIA)	18
Austria (Ö3 Austria Top 40)	13
Belgium (Ultratop 50 Flanders)	46
Croatia (Billboard)	1
Croatia (HR Top 40)	1
Czech Republic Singles Digital (ČNS IFPI)	57
Finland (Suomen virallinen lista)	4
Germany (GfK)	50
Global 200 (Billboard)	139
Greece International (IFPI)	4
Iceland (Tónlistinn)	15
Ireland (IRMA)	26
Israel (Mako Hitlist)	65
Latvia Streaming (LaIPA)	6
Lithuania (AGATA)	4
Lithuania Airplay (TopHit)	36
Luxembourg (Billboard)	16
Netherlands (Single Top 100)	41
Netherlands Tip (Dutch Top 40)	15
Norway (VG-lista)	33
Poland (Polish Streaming Top 100)	28
Portugal (AFP)	123
Sweden (Sverigetopplistan)	6
Switzerland (Schweizer Hitparade)	11
UK Singles (Official Charts)	36

=== Year-end charts ===
2024 year-end chart performance for "Rim Tim Tagi Dim"
Chart (2024)	Position
Croatia (HR Top 100)	1

== Certifications ==
Certifications for "Rim Tim Tagi Dim"
Region	Certification	Certified units/sales
Streaming
Greece (IFPI Greece)	Gold	1,000,000^{†}
^{†} Streaming-only figures based on certification alone.

== Release history ==
Release history and format for "Rim Tim Tagi Dim"
Country	Date	Format(s)	Label	Ref.
Various	12 January 2024	Digital download; streaming	Virgin Music Group	

== See also ==
- List of number-one singles of 2024 (Croatia)
