= Baby Lasagna =

Croatian singer

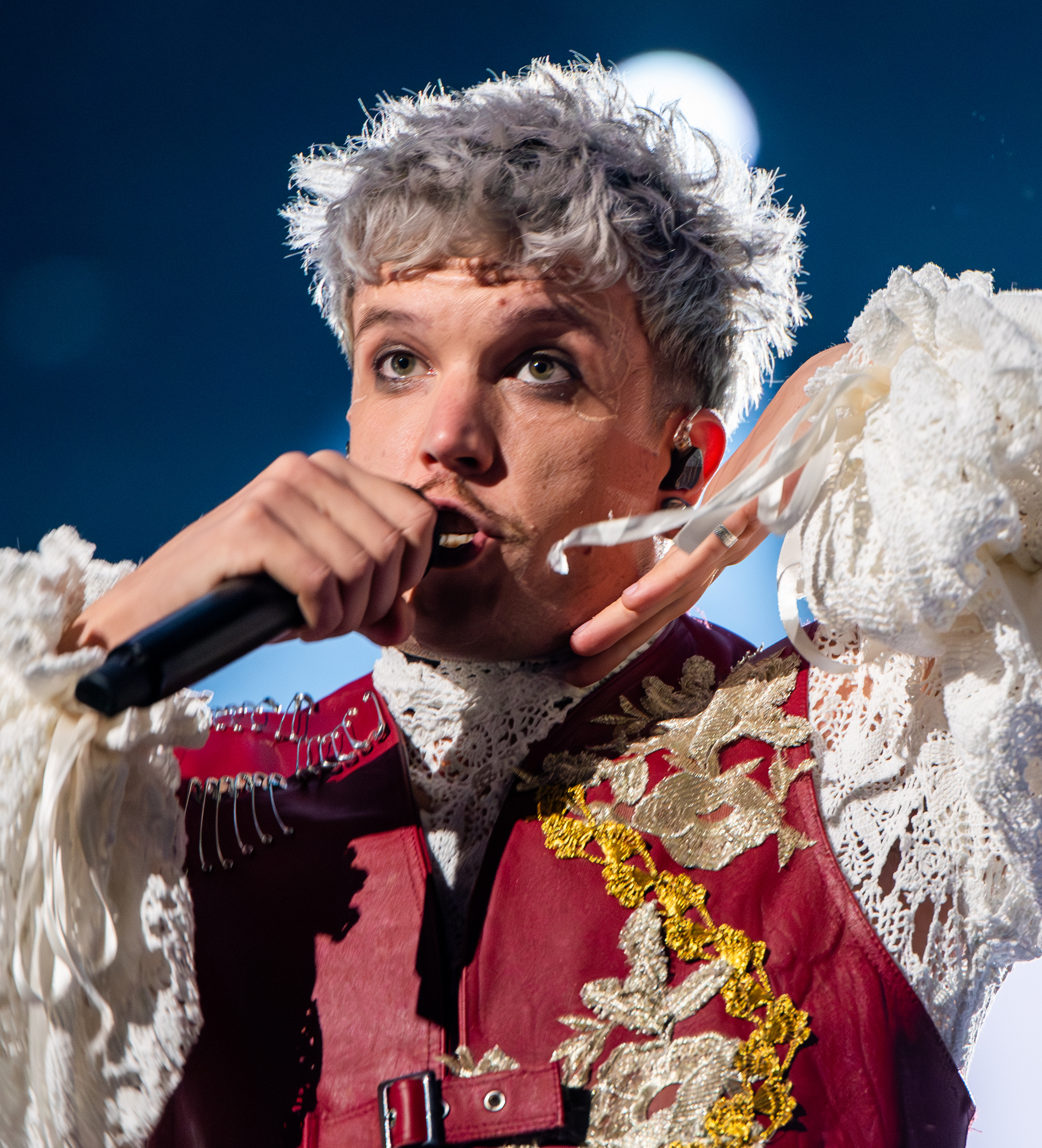
- Baby Lasagna performing "Rim Tim Tagi Dim" in Eurovision, 2024

Background information
- Born: Marko Purišić; 5 July 1995 (age 31); Rijeka, Croatia
- Genres: Pop-punk; techno; heavy metal; house
- Occupations: Singer; songwriter; producer
- Instruments: Vocals; guitar
- Years active: 2011–present
- Labels: Molly Studios; Virgin
- Formerly of: Manntra
- Spouse: Elizabeta Ružić (m. 2024)

Marko Purišić (pronounced [ˈmarko ˈpuriʃitɕ], born 5 July 1995), known professionally as Baby Lasagna, is a Croatian singer-songwriter and music producer, best known as a founding member of Manntra. He represented Croatia in the Eurovision Song Contest 2024 with the song "Rim Tim Tagi Dim", where he finished in second place overall with 547 points and first in the public vote, becoming Croatia's highest-scoring Eurovision entrant since its debut as an independent country in 1993.

== Early life ==
Marko Purišić was born on 5 July 1995 in Rijeka, Croatia, and grew up in Umag. He has a younger brother named Martin, who is also a musician and performed as a member of Mono Inc. until June 2024.

Coming from a family in which his mother and several other family members work as teachers, Purišić expressed that he would have most likely become a teacher too if he had not decided to pursue a musical career instead. He did, however, work as a children's assistant in elementary school for a year until quitting to study public relations at the VERN University in Zagreb. Purišić had previously also studied tourism in Buje and sound engineering in Ljubljana where his roommate was Martin Maze. He also studied Multimedia at the University North in Varaždin.

== Career ==
From 2011 to 2016 and from 2018 to 2022, Purišić served as the guitarist for Manntra, a Croatian folk metal band. While still a member of the band, they participated in Dora 2019, securing the fourth position with the song "In the Shadows" with a total of 12 points. Following his tenure with the group, he transitioned to pursue a solo career in 2023. On 21 October 2023, Purišić released his debut single "IG Boy" under the pseudonym Baby Lasagna through Molly Studios. Two months later, in December 2023, his second single "Don't Hate Yourself, But Don't Love Yourself Too Much" was released.

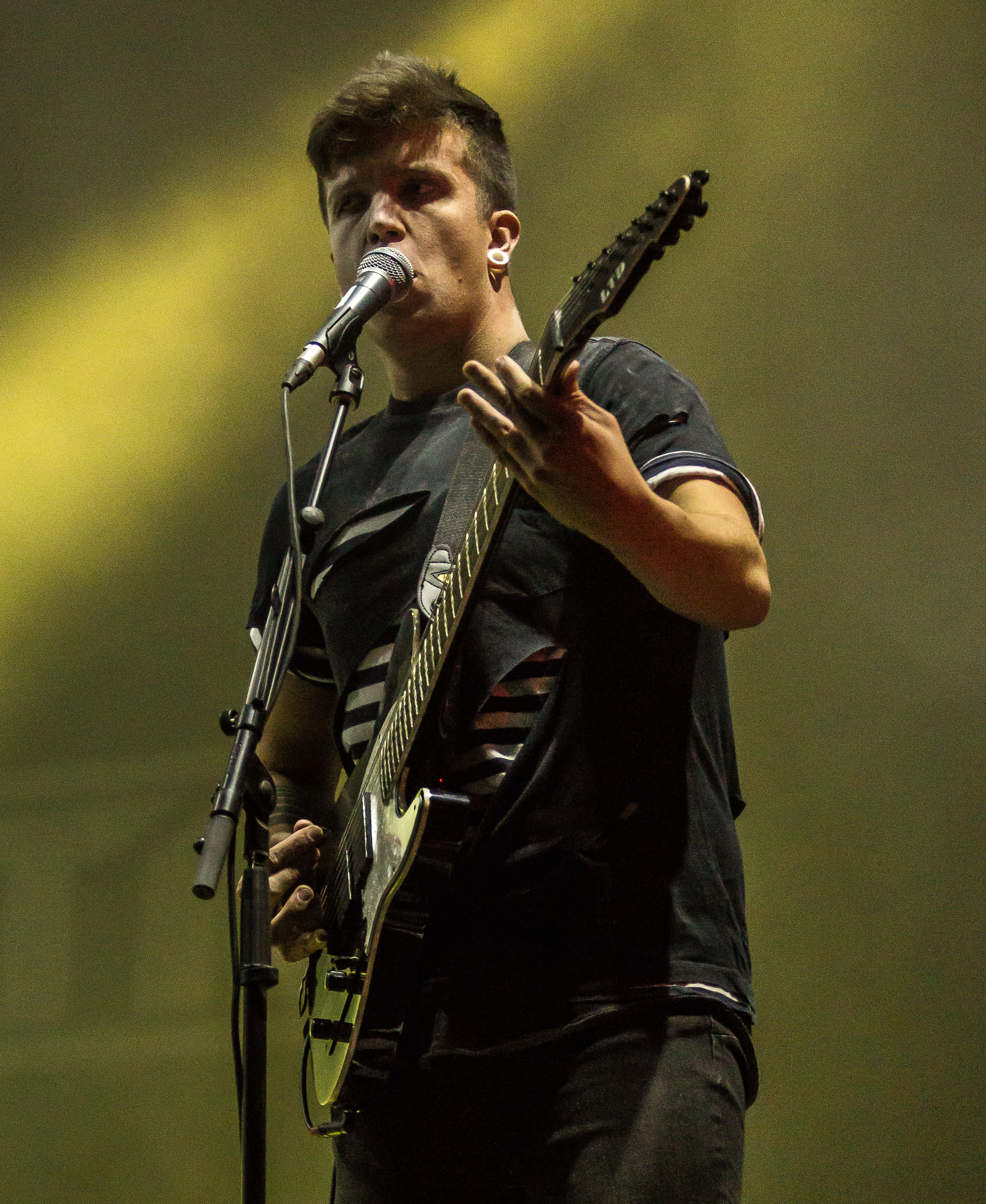
Purišić performing with Manntra in 2018

Purišić was among the participants of Dora 2024, the Croatian selection for the Eurovision Song Contest 2024, with the song "Rim Tim Tagi Dim"; he advanced from his semi-final on 23 February 2024 and ultimately won the final on 25 February. The song debuted at number 24 on the HR Top 40 chart, making it Purišić's first chart entry in Croatia; following his Dora triumph, it peaked at number one, as well as debuted and peaked at number two on Billboard's Croatia Songs chart. On 23 March, Purišić served as a presenter at the 31st Porin Awards. On 8 April, Purišić revealed that Croatian Radiotelevision (HRT) was producing a television documentary about his life and journey to Eurovision, which was set to air before his semi-final performance on 7 May. On 11 May in the Eurovision grand final, Purišić won the televote but finished second overall, behind Switzerland's Nemo and their song "The Code".

On 15 May, Purišić sold out three concerts at ŠRC Šalata, scheduled for 12–14 September, within minutes. He also performed at the Sea Star Festival in his native Umag on 25 May. His debut album, DMNS & Mosquitoes, was released on 7 February 2025. On 17 May 2025, he performed "#Eurodab", his new collaborative single with Käärijä, in the grand final of Eurovision Song Contest 2025.

On 20 November 2026, Purišić released the single "MEOW", a collaboration with Jerry Heil, who represented Ukraine at the Eurovision Song Contest 2024.

== Other projects ==
Additional works by Purišić include Bastion, a project formed in 2018 with friend and former bandmate Marko Matijević Sekul. In 2022, Purišić played a significant role in co-writing several tracks for Mono Inc.'s 12th studio album, Ravenblack, contributing to the album's success as it reached the number one spot in Germany, marking the band's highest-peaking album to date. Notably, many of the songs penned by Purišić were selected as singles, including "Princess of the Night," "Empire," "Heartbeat of the Dead," "Lieb mich," and "At the End of the Rainbow."

== Artistry ==
Purišić has said that his stage name has no meaning; he just wanted something that "sounds absurd." The phrase "baby lasagna" came to him while he was wandering the waterfront in Novigrad just looking for a store to buy a bottle of water, and he started using it to share his solo songs online without much thought of it being a persona. His visual presentation was described as "sometimes goth, and sometimes an emo reinterpretation of Mattel's famous Ken doll" by N1 Hrvatska's Bruno Šlat.

Purišić cites Rammstein, Twenty One Pilots, Electric Callboy, and Tonči & Madre Badessa as his musical influences. His music has been described as a mixture of pop-punk, techno, metal, and house. Purišić's musical style revolves around autobiographical storytelling, delving into his personal experiences, while also addressing broader societal issues, particularly those affecting his homeland. Noteworthy examples include "Rim Tim Tagi Dim", a poignant narrative depicting a young boy's journey from Croatia in search of a brighter future in another country.

== Personal life ==
Purišić is a Catholic. In an interview for Bitno.net, he named Padre Pio and Paul the Apostle as his spiritual role models. He is married to Elizabeta Ružić, who encouraged him to start a solo music career.

== Discography ==
=== Studio albums ===
Title	Details	Peak chart positions
Title	Details	CRO Dom.
DMNS & Mosquitoes	Released: 7 February 2025; Label: Polydor, Universal; Formats: CD, LP, digital download, streaming	1
End the Party	Released: 23 October 2026; Label: LAA; Formats: CD, LP, digital download, streaming	5

=== Live albums ===
Title	Details
Red Bull Symphonic (Live)	Released: 26 December 2025; Label: Polydor, Universal; Formats: Digital download, streaming

=== Singles ===
Title	Year	Peak chart positions										Album or EP
Title	Year	CRO Dom. Air.	FIN	GER	IRE	LTU	NLD	NOR	SWE	UK	WW	Album or EP
"IG Boy"	2023	—	—	—	—	—	—	—	—	—	—	DMNS & Mosquitoes
"Don't Hate Yourself, But Don't Love Yourself Too Much"	2023	—	—	—	—	—	—	—	—	—	—	DMNS & Mosquitoes
"Rim Tim Tagi Dim"	2024	1	4	50	26	4	41	33	6	36	139	DMNS & Mosquitoes
"And I"	2024	1	—	—	—	—	—	—	—	—	—	DMNS & Mosquitoes
"Biggie Boom Boom"	2024	1	—	—	—	— (Note: "Biggie Boom Boom" did not enter the AGATA Singlų Top 100, but peaked at number 85 on the TopHit Lithuanian Airplay.)	—	—	—	—	—	DMNS & Mosquitoes
"Catch Me If You Can"	2024	14	—	—	—	—	—	—	—	—	—	DMNS & Mosquitoes
"Stress"	2025	2	—	—	—	—	—	—	—	—	—	DMNS & Mosquitoes
"Bam Bam Bira" (with Kuku$)	2025	18	—	—	—	—	—	—	—	—	—	Non-album singles
"#eurodab" (with Käärijä)	2025	— (Note: "#eurodab" was ineligible for the Croatia Domestic Airplay chart, but peaked at number 3 on the Croatia International Airplay chart.)	7	—	—	92	—	—	93	— (Note: "#eurodab" did not enter the UK Singles Chart, but peaked at number 17 on the UK Singles Downloads Chart.)	—	Non-album singles
"Beskonačna osveta 2" (with Vojko V)	2025	35	—	—	—	—	—	—	—	—	—	Non-album singles
"End the Party"	2026	—	—	—	—	—	—	—	—	—	—	End the Party
"Sedated"	2026	—	—	—	—	—	—	—	—	—	—	End the Party
"Face on Your Phone"	2026	—	—	—	—	—	—	—	—	—	—	End the Party
"...Baby One More Time"	2026	—	—	—	—	—	—	—	—	—	—	Non-album single
"—" denotes a single that did not chart or was not released in that territory.

=== Other collaborations ===
Title	Year	Album or EP
"Naranča" (Olesia Rusinova featuring Baby Lasagna)	2025	Kolo

== Awards and nominations ==
Year	Award	Category	Nominee(s)	Result	Ref.
2024	Marcel Bezençon Awards	Press Award	"Rim Tim Tagi Dim"	Won	
2024	OUTmusic Awards	Eurovision Song of the Year	"Rim Tim Tagi Dim"	Third place	
2024	You're a Vision Award	Most Remarkable Outfit	Himself	Won	
2024	United States Embassy Ambassador's Award	Eurovision Performance	Himself	Awarded	
2024	Eurovision Awards	Miss Congeniality	Himself	Won	
2024	Eurovision Awards	Best Music Video	"Rim Tim Tagi Dim"	Won	
2024	Cesarica Awards	Hit Song of January	"Rim Tim Tagi Dim"	Won	
2024	Cesarica Awards	Hit Song of July	"And I"	Nominated	
2024	Cesarica Awards	Hit Song of August	"And I"	Nominated	
2024	Cesarica Awards	Hit Song of September	"Biggie Boom Boom"	Won	
2025	Zlatni Studio Awards	Singer of the Year	Himself	Won	
2025	Zlatni Studio Awards	Song of the Year	"Rim Tim Tagi Dim"	Won	
2025	Cesarica Awards	Hit of the Year	"Rim Tim Tagi Dim"	Won	
2025	Cesarica Awards	Hit Author	Himself	Won	
2025	Cesarica Awards	Digital Bestseller	Himself	Won	
2025	Cesarica Awards	Hit Song of April	"Bam Bam Bira" (with Kuku$)	Nominated	
2025	Porin Awards	Best Male Vocal Performance	"Rim Tim Tagi Dim"	Won	
2025	Porin Awards	Best Music Video	"Rim Tim Tagi Dim"	Won	
2025	Porin Awards	Song of the Year	"Rim Tim Tagi Dim"	Won	
2025	Porin Awards	New Artist of the Year	Himself	Won	

== Notes ==
Achievements
Preceded by Let 3 with "Mama ŠČ!"	Croatia in the Eurovision Song Contest; 2024	Succeeded by Marko Bošnjak with "Poison Cake"
