= The Voice Hrvatska season 4 =

The Voice Hrvatska
- Season 4
- Hosted by: Iva Šulentić; Ivan Vukušić
- Coaches: Davor Gobac; Damir Urban; Vanna; Dino Jelusick
- Winner: Martin Kosovec
- Winning coach: Vanna
- Runner-up: Ana Širić

Release
- Original network: HRT
- Original release: 11 November 2023 – 27 January 2024

Season chronology
- ← Previous; Season 3

The Voice Croatia is a music reality talent show, part of The Voice franchise based on the Dutch show The Voice of Holland.

Applications for the fourth season were from 10 March 2023 to 11 April 2023. The fourth season started showing on HRT's first program every Saturday from 11 November 2023, to 27 January 2024.

The mentors of the fourth season are Dino Jelusick, Vanna, Davor Gobac and Damir Urban, while this season's presenters are Iva Šulentić and Ivan Vukušić.

With Ivan Dečak's departure as a coach, the fourth season is the first to not feature any of the original coaches from the show's inaugural season.

On 27 January 2024, Martin Kosovec from Team Vanna won the competition, marking Vanna's first win as a coach.

== Coaches ==
Coaches of The Voice of Croatia season 4

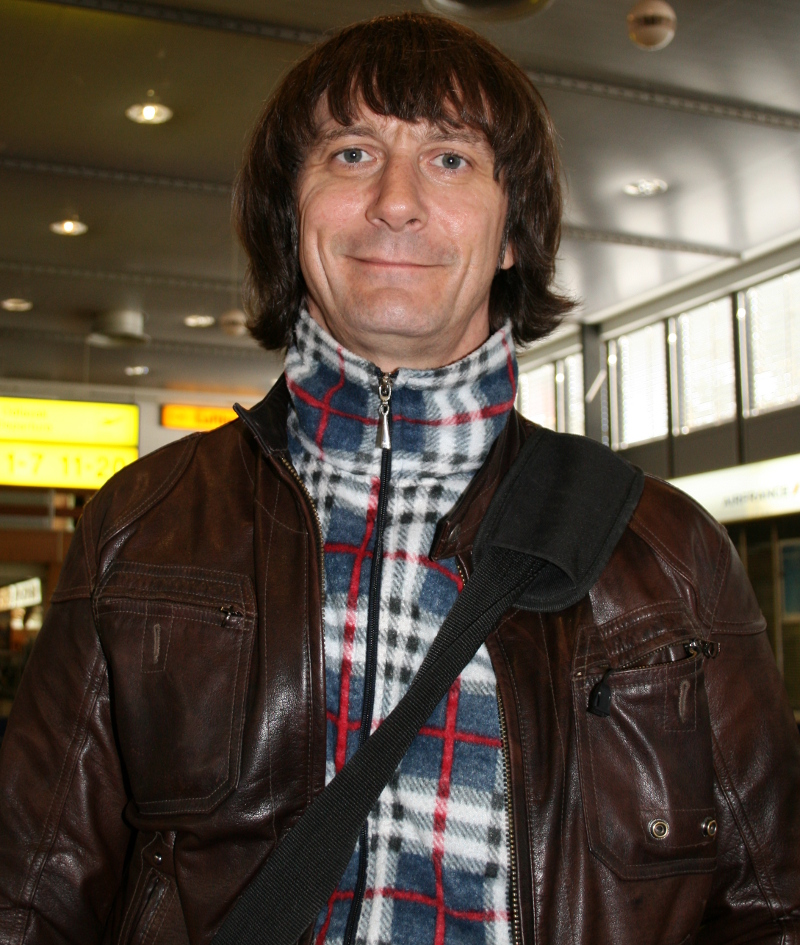
Davor Gobac

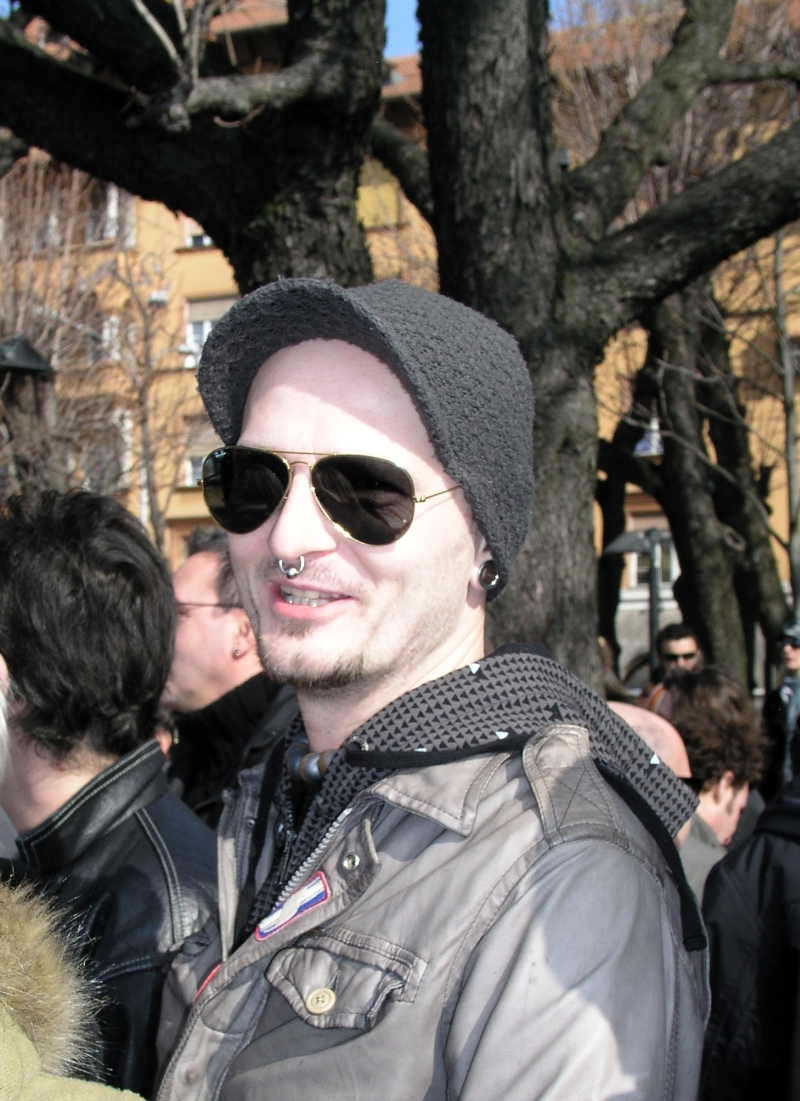
Damir Urban

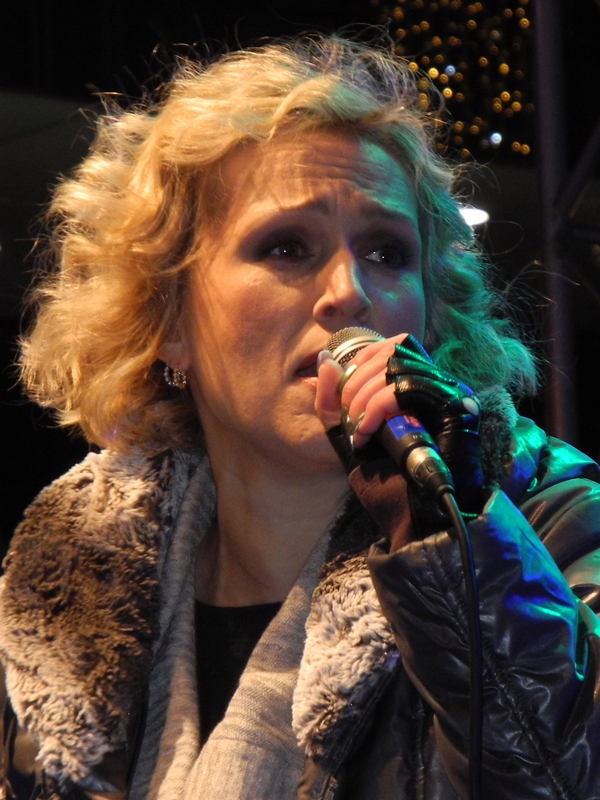
Vanna

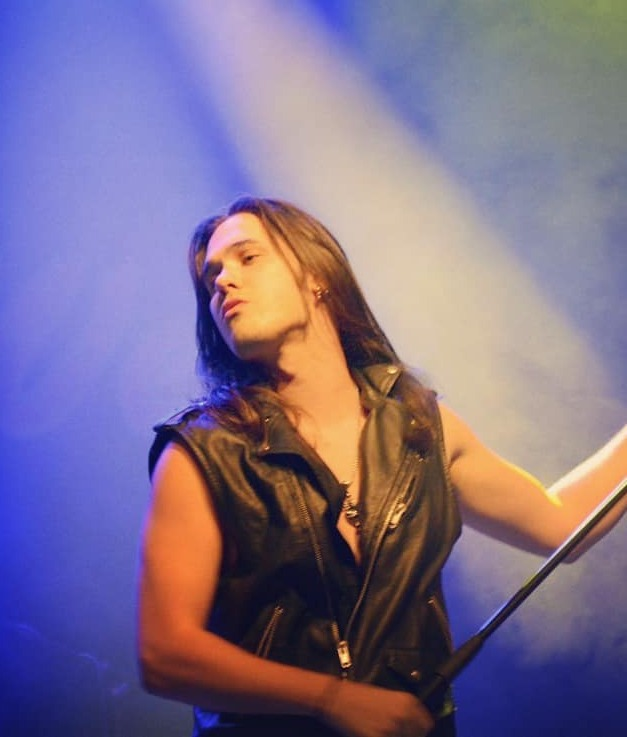
Dino Jelusick

== Teams ==
Color key

- Winner
- Runner-up
- Third place
- Fourth place
- Eliminated in the Semi-finals
- Eliminated in the Playoffs
- Saved by another coach in battle rounds
- Eliminated in the Battles
- Eliminated in the Final Knockout
- Eliminated in the Knockouts

Coach	Top 40 Artists					
Davor Gobac						
Davor Gobac	Luka Novokmet	Sandro Bjelovanić	Gabriela Braičić	Nikolina Stipić	Luna Rajković	Mario Pavlić
Davor Gobac	Fran Uccellini	Filipa Dragin	Maja Miklaužić Vahtarić	Nina Bencun-Kalac	Patrik Lovrek	
Damir Urban						
Damir Urban	Ana Širić	Toni Šimonović	Petar Brkljačić	Ivana Jukić	~~Natali Radovčić~~	Lucija Stipanović
Damir Urban	Danijela Hajdinak	Marina Ramljak	Aida Tokić	Korina Olivia Rogić	Ana Verunica	
Vanna						
Vanna	Martin Kosovec	Sergej Božić	Teo Kifer	Laura Sučec	~~Luka Novokmet~~	~~Ivana Jukić~~
Vanna	Dorian Stipčić	Valeria Jacek	Nensi Mitrović	Dinela Kazalac	Ivo Kralj	
Dino Jelusick						
Dino Jelusick	Jakov Peruško Rihtar	Natali Radovčić	Marko Vukić	Duška Brčić Šušak	~~Martin Kosovec~~	Karla Jovanović
Dino Jelusick	Martina Bakić	Borna Brkić	Gabrijel Lukač	Josip Juraga	Karla Arković	
Note: Italicized names denote "stolen" contestants within their new teams (names struck through on their original teams).

== Blind Auditions ==
Every candidate who passed all three preselections performed at the audition. The mentors (jury) have their backs to the candidate while he is singing, and if the mentors liked the performance, they would turn around before the end of the song. If only one of the mentors turned to the candidate, he or she directly enters his or her team. However, if the candidate was approached by two or more mentors, he or she chooses between those who were approached. Those whom the mentors did not turn to, did not pass the audition.

Color key

✔	Coach pressed "I WANT YOU" button
	Artist defaulted to a coach's team
	Artist elected a coach's team
	Artist was eliminated with no coach pressing their button
✘	Coach pressed the "I WANT YOU" button, but was blocked by Dino from getting the artist
✘	Coach pressed the "I WANT YOU" button, but was blocked by Vanna from getting the artist
✘	Coach pressed the "I WANT YOU" button, but was blocked by Urban from getting the artist
✘	Coach pressed the "I WANT YOU" button, but was blocked by Gobac from getting the artist

=== Episode 1 (11 November) ===
Order	Contestant	Age	Hometown	Song	Mentor's and artist's choices			
Order	Contestant	Age	Hometown	Song	Dino	Vanna	Urban	Gobac
1	Karla Jovanović	31	Mostar	"I Just Want to Make Love to You"	✔	✔	–	✔
2	Paolo Kaštelan	22	Cres	"Dobar dan"	–	–	–	–
3	Ana Verunica	23	Mali Lošinj	"It's a Man's Man's Man's World"	✔	–	✔	✔
4	Fran Uccellini	20	Zagreb	"Man in the Mirror"	–	–	–	✔
5	Romana Kalauz	31	Dubrovnik	"Oops!... I Did It Again"	–	–	–	–
6	Ivana Jukić	21	Posušje	"Stine"	–	✔	–	–
7	Danijela Hajdinjak	23	Rijeka	"Make You Feel My Love"	✔	✔	✔	✔
8	Ema Žiher	24	Varaždin	"Toxic"	–	–	–	–
9	Sandro Bjelanović	24	Novska	"Break On Through (To the Other Side)"	–	–	–	✔
10	Borna Brkić	25	Zagreb	"Vienna"	✔	–	–	–
11	Katarina Perić	22	Zagreb	"I'll Be Waiting"	–	–	–	–
12	Sergej Božić	19	Rijeka	"Ružica si bila"	✔	✔	✔	–

=== Episode 2 (18 November) ===
The mentors began the episode singing "Stranac u noći" by Massimo.

Order	Contestant	Age	Hometown	Song	Mentor's and artist's choices			
Order	Contestant	Age	Hometown	Song	Dino	Vanna	Urban	Gobac
1	Ante Zuanović	25	Zagreb	"Pismo ćali"	–	–	–	–
2	Gabriela Braičić	18	Duće	"Ain't No Way"	✔	✔	✘	✔
3	Teo Kifer	25	Rajsavac	"Bless the Broken Road"	–	✔	–	–
4	Nora Bago	25	Split	"Don't Know Why"	–	–	–	–
5	Martin Kosovec	18	Zagreb	"My Way"	✔	✔	✔	–
6	Anđela Grubišin Ković	33	Tribunj	"I Never Loved a Man (The Way I Love You)"	–	–	–	–
7	Lucija Stipanović	20	Kostrena	"To Be Loved"	✔	✔	✔	✔
8	Mario Pavlić	35	Zagreb	"Burning Love"	–	–	–	✔
9	Sara Mustapić	27	Imotski	"Zemlja i stina"	–	–	–	–
10	Karla Arković	19	Split	"Stand Up"	✔	✔	–	–
11	Aida Tokić	21	Rijeka	"All I Ask"	–	–	✔	–
12	Ivo Kralj	26	Solin	"Blackbird"	–	✔	–	–

=== Episode 3 (25 November) ===
During the show, Dino Jelusić and Davor Gobac sang the song "Ramona" by Psihomodo Pop.

Order	Contestant	Age	Hometown	Song	Mentor's and artist's choices			
Order	Contestant	Age	Hometown	Song	Dino	Vanna	Urban	Gobac
1	Filipa Dragin	25	Makarska	"Don't Cry for Louie"	–	–	–	✔
2	Jakov Peruško Rihtar	21	Zagreb	"Arms of a Woman"	✔	✔	✘	✔
3	Tea Dominković	21	Zagreb	"Ako me nosiš na duši"	–	–	–	–
4	Luka Novokmet	26	Zagreb	"You Do Something to Me"	–	✔	–	–
5	Martina Bakić	21	Imotski	"Nutbush City Limits"	✔	–	–	✔
6	Ravena Posavec	19	Sveta Nedelja	"Dancing with the Devil"	–	–	–	–
7	Dorian Stipčić	24	Varaždin	"This City"	–	✔	✔	–
8	Ana Širić	24	Zagreb	"If I Can Dream"	✔	✔	✔	✔
9	Mateo Horvat	22	Zadar	"Demons"	–	–	–	–
10	Maja Miklaužić Vahtarić	33	Kumrovec	"At Last"	–	–	–	✔
11	Petar Brkljačić	32	Zagreb	"More snova"	✔	✔	✔	–
12	Dario Belić	37	Jelsa	"Granada"	–	–	–	–

=== Episode 4 (2 December) ===
During the show, Urban sang his own song "Iskra".

Order	Contestant	Age	Hometown	Song	Mentor's and artist's choices			
Order	Contestant	Age	Hometown	Song	Dino	Vanna	Urban	Gobac
1	Natali Radovčić	20	Žbandaj	"She Used to Be Mine"	–	✔	✔	–
2	Sandro Capar	27	Lekenik	"You Can Have the Crown"	–	–	–	–
3	Duška Brčić Šušak	24	Sinj	"I See Red"	✔	✔	✔	✔
4	Nina Bencun Kalac	35	Zadar	"All About That Bass"	✔	–	–	✔
5	Leon Lasić	28	Mostar	"Everytime You Go Away"	–	–	–	–
6	Patrik Lovrek	23	Koprivnica	"Legendary"	–	✔	–	✔
7	Valeria Jacek	23	Đakovo	"One Night Only"	–	✔	–	–
8	Laura Sučec	23	Mošćenica	"Molitva za Magdalenu"	✔	✔	✔	✔
9	Donna Danijela Dragun	23	Ilok	"Love on the Brain"	–	–	–	–
10	Marko Vukić	28	Dubrovnik	"Majko zemljo"	✔	–	–	✔
11	Toni Šimonović	27	Zagreb	"Gravity"	–	✔	✔	–

=== Episode 5 (9 December) ===
Order	Contestant	Age	Hometown	Song	Mentor's and artist's choices			
Order	Contestant	Age	Hometown	Song	Dino	Vanna	Urban	Gobac
1	Korina Olivia Rogić	21	Zagreb	"Runnin' (Lose It All)"	✔	✘	✔	–
2	Maja Medanović Kolić and Ivan Kolić	N/A	Zagreb	"If You Don't Know Me by Now"	–	–	–	–
3	Nikolina Stipić	21	Jalševec Nartski, Rugvica	"Tamo gdje je sve po mom"	–	–	–	✔
4	Josip Juraga	26	Murter	"Seven Nation Army"	✔	–	–	✔
5	Dora Blažević	22	Punat	"Born This Way"	–	–	–	–
6	Dinela Kazalac	18	Karojba	"Stone Cold"	✔	✔	–	–
7	Luna Rajković	20	Zagreb	"Padam, padam..."	–	–	–	✔
8	Barbara Vlainić	24	Osijek	"That's Life"	–	–	–	Team full
9	Marina Ramljak	23	Virovitica	"The House of the Rising Sun"	✘	–	✔	Team full
10	Gabrijel Lukač	35	Zagreb	"Skin"	✔	✔	Team full	Team full
11	Nensi Mitrović	24	Pula	"If I Ain't Got You"	Team full	✔	Team full	Team full

== Knockouts ==
The mentors groups their team into three groups. After the performance of the artists from the coach's team, the coach must do the following: (1) at least one who will advance in the battles; (2) at least one who will be eliminated; and (3) save at most one contestant for the final knockout. In the final knockout, in case the coach has not selected 6 contestants who will participate in the next round, the coach calls a maximum of three artists and must choose those who will advance to the next round.

Color key:

Artist advanced to the Battles
Artist advanced to the Final Knockout
Artist was eliminated

=== Episode 6 (December 16) ===
Order	Coach	Artist	Song	Result
1	Vanna	Ivo Kralj	"It's Probably Me"	Eliminated
2	Vanna	Ivana Jukić	"Opusti se"	Advanced
3	Vanna	Sergej Božić	"Ti moje jedino drago"	Advanced
4	Dino	Duška Brčić Šušak	"Weak"	Advanced
5	Dino	Karla Arković	"Ain't Nobody"	Eliminated
6	Dino	Karla Jovanović	"Ne prepoznajem ga"	Advanced
7	Dino	Marko Vukić	"Ready for Love"	Saved
8	Gobac	Filipa Dragin	"Mercy on Me"	Saved
9	Gobac	Fran Uccellini	"Clown"	Advanced
10	Gobac	Patrik Lovrek	"The Pretender"	Eliminated
11	Urban	Ana Verunica	"Wicked Game"	Eliminated
12	Urban	Petar Brkljačić	"Tišina"	Advanced
13	Urban	Lucija Stipanović	"Something's Got a Hold on Me"	Advanced

=== Episode 7 (December 23) ===
Order	Coach	Artist	Song	Result
1	Urban	Natali Radovčić	"Shallow"	Advanced
2	Urban	Marina Ramljak	"Love Is a Losing Game"	Saved
3	Urban	Korina Olivia Rogić	"Rise Up"	Eliminated
4	Urban	Ana Širić	"Nights in White Satin"	Advanced
5	Dino	Borna Brkić	"Moonage Daydream"	Saved
6	Dino	Jakov Peruško Rihtar	"Let's Get It On"	Advanced
7	Dino	Josip Juraga	"Use Somebody"	Eliminated
8	Vanna	Luka Novokmet	"Don't Let Me Down"	Advanced
9	Vanna	Dinela Kazalac	"Il treno per Genova"	Eliminated
10	Vanna	Dorian Stipčić	"Dan koji se pamti"	Saved
11	Gobac	Nina Bencun Kalac	"Black Velvet"	Eliminated
12	Gobac	Gabriela Braičić	"Ima jedan svijet"	Advanced
13	Gobac	Luna Rajković	"Dernière danse"	Advanced
14	Gobac	Mario Pavlić	"Beautiful Day"	Advanced

=== Episode 8 (December 30) ===
Order	Coach	Artist	Song	Result
1	Gobac	Sandro Bjelanović	"Lonely Boy"	Advanced
2	Gobac	Nikolina Stipić	"Jovano, Jovanke"	Saved
3	Gobac	Maja Miklaužić Vahtarić	"Angel"	Eliminated
4	Dino	Martina Bakić	"Baby Love"	Advanced
5	Dino	Martin Kosovec	"I'll Never Fall in Love Again"	Advanced
6	Dino	Gabriel Lukač	"Like a Stone"	Eliminated
7	Vanna	Valeria Jacek	"Oprosti mi"	Saved
8	Vanna	Laura Sučec	"Teške boje"	Advanced
9	Vanna	Teo Kifer	"Say You Won't Let Go"	Advanced
10	Vanna	Nensi Mitrović	"Da znaš"	Eliminated
11	Urban	Toni Šimonović	"Sono solo parole"	Advanced
12	Urban	Aida Tokić	"Jealous"	Eliminated
13	Urban	Danijela Hajdinjak	"Always Remember Us This Way"	Saved

==== Final Knockout ====
Final Knockouts colour key
Artist advanced to the battles
Artist was eliminated

Order	Coach	Artist	Result
1	Gobac	Filipa Dragin	Eliminated
2	Gobac	Nikolina Stipić	Advanced
3	Dino	Marko Vukić	Advanced
4	Dino	Borna Brkić	Eliminated
5	Vanna	Dorian Stipčić	Advanced
6	Vanna	Valeria Jacek	Eliminated
7	Urban	Marina Ramljak	Eliminated
8	Urban	Danijela Hajdinjak	Advanced

== Battles ==
=== Episode 9 (6 January) ===
- Contestant won the battle and advanced to the live shows
- Contestant lost the battle and was eliminated
- Contestant lost the battle, but was stolen by another coach and advanced to the live shows

Order	Mentor	Contestants		Song	Result			
Order	Mentor	Contestants		Song	Dino	Vanna	Urban	Gobac
1	Vanna	Dorian Stipčić	Laura Sučec	"Drivers License"	–	–	–	–
2	Urban	Natali Radovčić	Petar Brkljačić	"Ima nešto u tom što me nećeš"	✔	–	–	–
3	Dino	Marko Vukić	Martin Kosovec	"Let The Sunshine In"	Team full	✔	–	–
4	Gobac	Gabriela Braičić	Fran Uccellini	"Come neve"	Team full	Team full	–	–
5	Dino	Duška Brčić Šušak	Martina Bakić	"It's All Coming Back to Me Now"	Team full	Team full	–	–
6	Urban	Danijela Hajdinjak	Toni Šimonović	"Creep"	Team full	Team full	–	–
7	Gobac	Sandro Bjelanović	Mario Pavlić	"Beggin'"	Team full	Team full	–	–
8	Vanna	Ivana Jukić	Sergej Božić	"Lift Me Up"	Team full	Team full	✔	–
9	Urban	Lucija Stipanović	Ana Širić	"Imagine"	Team full	Team full	Team full	–
10	Gobac	Luna Rajković	Nikolina Stipić	"Vino i gitare"	Team full	Team full	Team full	–
11	Vanna	Luka Novokmet	Teo Kifer	"The Loneliest"	Team full	Team full	Team full	✔
12	Dino	Jakov Peruško Rihtar	Karla Jovanović	"Higher Love"	Team full	Team full	Team full	Team Full

== Live Shows ==
The live shows consist of three shows: one live competition, one semi-final and one live final show.

- Artist advanced from the public
- Artist advanced from his/her coach
- Artist was eliminated

=== Episode 10 (13 January) ===
Mentor	Order	Contestant	Song	Result
Dino Jelusick	1	Duška Brčić Šušak	"Ništa nova"	Eliminated
Dino Jelusick	2	Jakov Peruško Rihtar	"Samo pričaj"	Dino's choice
Dino Jelusick	3	Natali Radovčić	"Dođi"	Public's vote
Dino Jelusick	4	Marko Vukić	"Zelenu granu s tugom žuta voća"	Eliminated
Davor Gobac	5	Gabriela Braičić	"Alone"	Eliminated
Davor Gobac	6	Sandro Bjelanović	"Psycho Killer"	Gobac's choice
Davor Gobac	7	Nikolina Stipić	"No Time to Die"	Eliminated
Davor Gobac	8	Luka Novokmet	"Lažu fotografije"	Public's vote
Vanna	9	Laura Sučec	"Kad zaspu anđeli"	Eliminated
Vanna	10	Sergej Božić	"Ima neka tajna veza"	Vanna's choice
Vanna	11	Martin Kosovec	"Tvoja zemlja"	Public's vote
Vanna	12	Teo Kifer	"Ni u tvome srcu"	Eliminated
Damir Urban	13	Ivana Jukić	"Da je tuga snijeg"	Eliminated
Damir Urban	14	Petar Brkljačić	"Angels"	Eliminated
Damir Urban	15	Toni Šimonović	"Tears in Heaven"	Urban's choice
Damir Urban	16	Ana Širić	"Dušo moja"	Public's vote

=== Episode 11: Semifinal (20 January) ===
Mentor	Order	Contestant	Song	Result
Damir Urban	1	Ana Širić	"Used to Be Young"	Public's vote
Damir Urban	2	Toni Šimonović	"Never Tear Us Apart"	Eliminated
Davor Gobac	3	Luka Novokmet	"Sledgehammer"	Public's vote
Davor Gobac	4	Sandro Bjelanović	"Crazy Little Thing Called Love"	Eliminated
Dino Jelusick	5	Natali Radovčić	"Caruso"	Eliminated
Dino Jelusick	6	Jakov Peruško Rihtar	"Dva put san umra"	Public's vote
Vanna	7	Martin Kosovec	"Unchained Melody"	Public's vote
Vanna	8	Sergej Božić	"Još i danas zamiriše trešnja"	Eliminated

=== Episode 12: Finale (27 January) ===
The finale aired on 27 January 2024. Like the previous two episodes in the live shows, the results were determined by public voting. At the end of the episode, Martin Kosovec from Team Vanna was declared winner.

Mentor	Contestant	Order	Audition song	Order	Song	Result
Dino Jelusick	Jakov Peruško Rihtar	1	"Arms of a Woman"	5	"Ostala si uvijek ista"	Fourth place
Vanna	Martin Kosovec	2	"My Way"	6	"Sjaj u tami"	Winner
Damir Urban	Ana Širić	3	"If I Can Dream"	7	"Da sam ja netko"	Runner-up
Davor Gobac	Luka Novokmet	4	"You Do Something to Me"	8	"Pokreni se (Izmjeni se)"	Third place
