= Vjekoslav Ključarić =

Croatian singer and songwriter

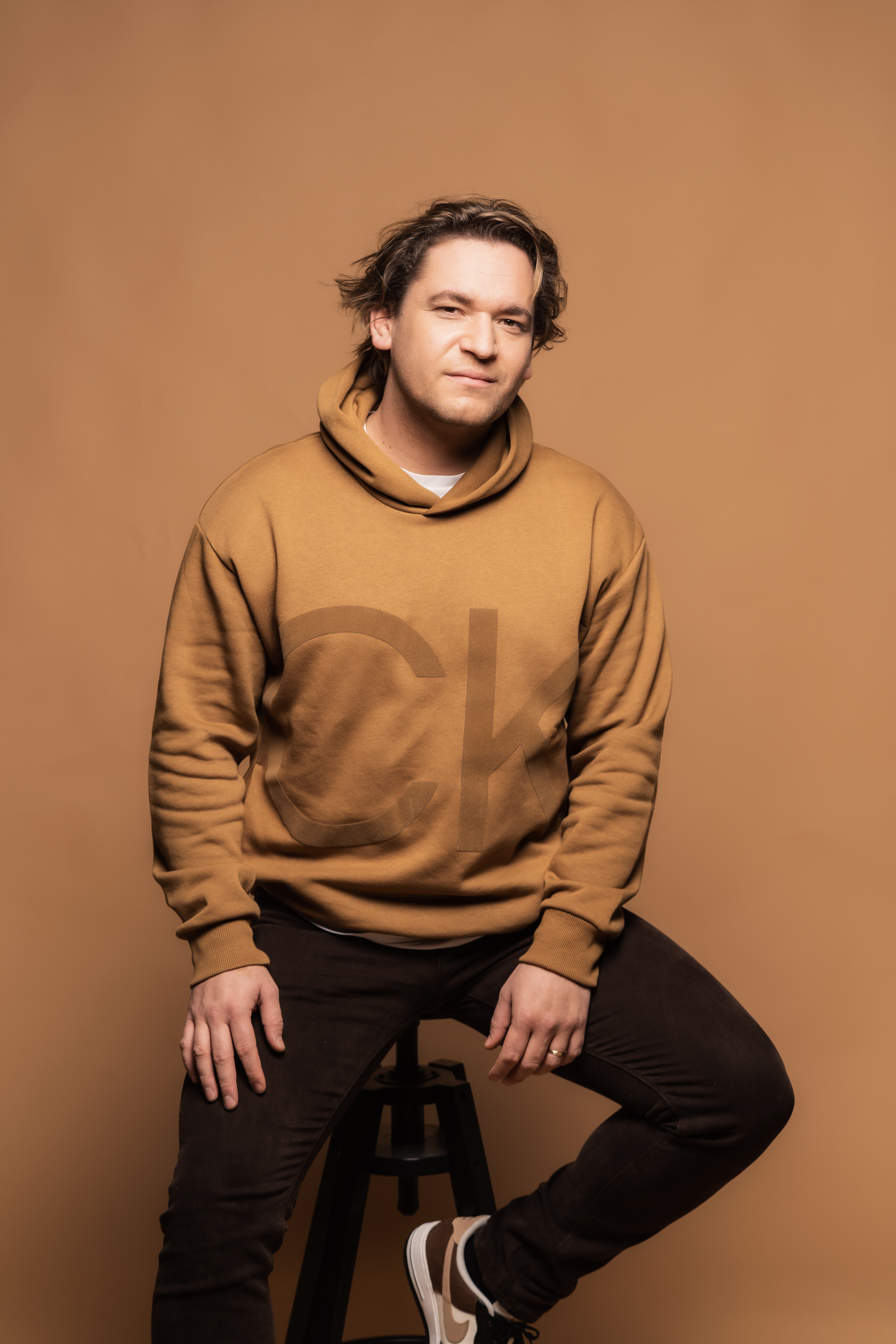
Vjekoslav Ključarić

Vjekoslav Ključarić (born September 15, 1992. in Zagreb), also known as Vjeko, is a Croatian singer and songwriter. He rose to fame by participating in the second season of The Voice Hrvatska and is also known for his numerous performances in a popular music show produced by Croatian national television (HRT) called A-strana.

== Life and career ==
Ključarić spent his early life in Zaprešić. Afterwards he moved with his family to Punat on the island of Krk. Besides music, he also has a strong passion for wakeboarding. In 2007 he won the Croatian and Slovenian Junior Men Championship. Vjeko was also part of the wakeboarding national team that represented Croatia at the European Championship in Turkey. Unfortunately, he injured his knee at the championship in Turkey, which ended his professional wakeboarding career.

Vjeko founded his first demo band Šoder at the age of 15 and performed with them at numerous local alternative festivals such as Prvomajski Inkubator, HGF, RiRock, etc. In 2012 and 2013, Vjeko performed solo at the Zlatni Otok Pjeva festival, where he won the Audience Award in 2012 and the Jury Award in 2013. From 2012 to 2017, Vjekoslav performed with the rock and roll cover band Open Road throughout Croatia, and was also the opening act for Atomsko sklonište.

In 2016, after two pre-auditions, Ključarić successfully qualified for the second season of HRT's music show The Voice Croatia. After the blind audition, he joined Jacques Houdek's team. After a singing duel with other singers from Jacques' team, Vjekoslav was eliminated by Jacques and was picked up by Ivan Dečak for his team.

After The Voice, Vjeko began his solo career. In March 2017, he released a duet with Eni Jurišić called Prije nego nestane, which reached 8th place on the HR Top 40 chart. At the same time, Vjeko continued his singing engagement in HRT's most-watched music show, A-strana, where he performed for four seasons.

Since then Vjeko has released singles Ti si ta, Sretan kraj, Karte za sreću, Samo hodaj dalje, and Neka zvona zvone, which reached 7th place on the HR Top 40 chart. He released a single titled Nije kraj in 2022.

He performs regularly throughout the country and region, and occasionally participates in special holiday shows on HRT.

== Personal life ==
In May 2022, Vjekoslav married a singer Eni Jurišić, after a seven-year relationship that began during the second season of The Voice Hrvatska. In January 2023, they announced that they were expecting a baby girl.
