= Marin Jurić Čivro =

Croatian singer

Marin Jurić-Čivro
- Born: 5 May 1994 (age 31); Virovitica, Croatia
- Genres: Rock
- Occupations: Singer; songwriter
- Instruments: Vocals; drum; guitar
- Years active: 2015–present
- Labels: Universal Music, Menart, Dallas

Marin Jurić-Čivro (born 5 May 1994) is a Croatian singer. He rose to fame after placing third in season one of The Voice Hrvatska.

== Music career ==
Starting 7 February 2015, Marin Jurić-Čivro appeared as a contestant on the first season of the reality talent show The Voice Hrvatska. On the first show, Jurić sang Bill Withers' song "Ain't No Sunshine". Two judges, Indira Levak and Ivan Dečak turned around with Jurić choosing Ivan Dečak as his coach On 7 March 2015, in the Battle Round, Jurić's coach Dečak put him against Azra Kuštrić Skender choosing that they both sing "One", originally by U2 and Mary J. Blige. As a result, Dečak picked him to continue his journey into the live shows. On 28 March 2015, Jurić a rendition of Jeff Buckley's song "Hallelujah". During the Top 16, Jurić sang a rendition of Damir Urban's "Mjesto za mene". In the Top 12, he sang Deep Purple's "Soldier of Fortune". At the semi-final on 18 April 2015, Jurić performed Hozier's "Take Me to Church" and advanced to the final. At the finals, Jurić sang the song "Tango" along with his coach Ivan Dečak, he also re-sang his audition song "Ain't No Sunshine". He finished third overall.

On 16 June 2015, Jurić released his debut single "Dobro jutro svima". On 23 December 2019, Jurić was announced as one of the 16 participants in Dora 2020, the national contest in Croatia to select the country's Eurovision Song Contest 2020 entry, with the song "Naivno". On 5 December 2024, Jurić has been announced as one of the 24 participants in Dora 2025, the national contest in Croatia to select the country's Eurovision Song Contest 2025 entry, with the song "Gorjelo je" from the author Ivan Dečak.

== Discography ==
=== Singles ===
Title	Year	Peak chart positions	Album
Title	Year	CRO	Album
"Dobro jutro svima"	2015	—	Non-album singles
"Zašto još volim te" (with Luminize)	2015	1	Non-album singles
"Pjesma za tebe"	2016	—	Non-album singles
"Još uvijek"	2017	40	Non-album singles
"Vjetar"	2017	36	Non-album singles
"Tvoj lik"	2018	—	Non-album singles
"Zima" (with Nina Kraljić)	2020	10	Non-album singles
"Naivno"	2020	22	Non-album singles
"Gorjelo je"	2025		Non-album singles
"—" denotes a single that did not chart or was not released.

== Awards and nominations ==
Year	Association	Category	Nominee / work	Result	Ref.
2015	Music Pub	Best New Artist	Marin Jurić-Čivro	Won	
