= Jure Brkljača =

- Born: 21 September 1994 (age 31); Zadar, Croatia
- Genres: Pop
- Occupations: Singer; songwriter
- Instruments: Vocals; guitar, piano
- Years active: 2015–present
- Label: Hit Records

Jure Brkljača (born 21 September 1994) is a Croatian singer. He is known for placing fourth in season one of The Voice Hrvatska.

== Early life ==
Brkljača was born in Zadar, Croatia on 21 September 1994.

== Music career ==
Starting 31 January 2015, Jure Brkljača appeared as a contestant on the first season of the reality talent show The Voice Hrvatska. On the first show, Brkljača sang Oliver Dragojević's song "Brod u boci". All four judges, Jacques Houdek, Indira Levak, Tony Cetinski and Ivan Dečak turned around with Levak, Cetinski and Dečak giving him a standing ovation. Brkljača eventually chose Tony Cetinski as his coach. On 21 February 2015, in the Battle Round, Brkljača's coach Cetinski put him against Romana Lalić Pejković choosing that they both sing "Stine", originally by Oliver Dragojević. As a result, Cetinski picked him to continue his journey into the live shows. On 28 March 2015, Brkljača sang Indexi's song "Bacila je sve niz rijeku". During the Top 16, Brkljača sang a rendition of "Još i danas zamiriše trešnja". In the Top 12, he sang Zlatan Stipišić Gibonni's "Posoljeni zrak i razlivena tinta". At the semi-final on 18 April 2015, Brkljača performed Mišo Kovač's "Ti si mi u krvi" and advanced to the final. At the finals, Brkljača sang the song "Ti, samo ti" along with his coach Tony Cetinski, he also re-sang his audition song "Brod u boci". He finished fourth overall.

On 5 October 2015, Brkljača released his debut single "Druga strana". On 17 January 2019, he was announced as one of the 16 participants in Dora 2019, the national contest in Croatia to select the country's Eurovision Song Contest 2019 entry, with the song "Ne postojim kad nisu tu". He finished the competition as eighth with a total of seven points. Followed by the performance on Dora 2019 the song peaked at number three in Croatia. In late 2019 Brkljača applied for Dora 2020 with the song "Hajde, nazovi me!" and was chosen as one of the contestants on 23 December 2019.

== Discography ==
=== Studio albums ===
Title	Details	Peak chart positions
Title	Details	CRO
Ostani tajna mog života	Released: 25 March 2021; Label: Hit Records; Formats: CD, digital download, streaming	38

=== Singles ===
Title	Year	Peak chart positions	Album
Title	Year	CRO	Album
"Druga strana"	2015	—	Ostani tajna mog života
"Pristani na sve"	2017	—	Ostani tajna mog života
"Božić je"	2017	—	Non-album single
"Ona me vuče"	2018	35	Ostani tajna mog života
"Što osjećaš ti"	2018	34	Ostani tajna mog života
"Ne postojim kad nisi tu"	2019	3	Ostani tajna mog života
"Lipa"	2019	4	Ostani tajna mog života
"Hajde nazovi me!"	2020	4	Ostani tajna mog života
"Znao sam"	2020	5	Ostani tajna mog života
"Ostani tajna mog života"	2021	2	Ostani tajna mog života
"Da sutra odem od tebe"	2022	8	Ostani tajna mog života
"Isti ka i ti" (with Dino Petrić)	2023	5	Non-album single
"—" denotes a single that did not chart or was not released.
