= The Voice Hrvatska season 1 =

The Voice Hrvatska
- Season 1
- Hosted by: Ivan Vukušić; Iva Šulentić
- Coaches: Indira Levak; Ivan Dečak; Tony Cetinski; Jacques Houdek
- Winner: Nina Kraljić
- Winning mentor: Jacques Houdek
- Runner-up: Mateo Resman

Release
- Original network: HRT
- Original release: 17 January – 25 April 2015

The Voice – Najljepši glas Hrvatske is a Croatian television music competition to find new singing talent. The first series began on 17 January 2015 and ended on 25 April 2015. The show was co-presented by Ivan Vukušić and Iva Šulentić on HRT. The series was won by Nina Kraljić, who was on Jacques Houdek's team.

== Teams ==
Key

- Winner
- Runner-up
- Third place
- Fourth place
- Eliminated in the Live shows
- Eliminated in the Battle rounds

Coaches	Top 48		
Indira Levak			
Indira Levak	Mateo Resman	Ana Opačak	Bruna Oberan
Indira Levak	Karlo Cvetković	Dora Vestić	Tomislav Užarević
Indira Levak	Samanta Bučaj	Zdravka Damjanović	Samanta Vrbljanac
Indira Levak	Sven Pfeifer	Andrea Mihal	Ivan Županović
Ivan Dečak			
Ivan Dečak	Marin Jurić Čivro	Iva Gortan	Elena Stella
Ivan Dečak	Mahir Kapetanović	Daniel Jurišević	Dario Došlić
Ivan Dečak	Azra Kuštrić Skender	Valentina Trstenjak	Nicole Vidak
Ivan Dečak	Dino Purić	Melanija Purić	Ante Brzić
Tony Cetinski			
Tony Cetinski	Jure Brkljača	Alen Bičević	Sara Barbarić
Tony Cetinski	Iva Ajduković	Božidarka Matija Čerina	Kristina Boban
Tony Cetinski	Romana Lalić Pejković	Bojan Aleksovski	Andrija Kovačević
Tony Cetinski	Kristian Ordulj	Vladimir Matica Mac	Maja Škiljević
Jacques Houdek			
Jacques Houdek	Nina Kraljić	Dino Petrić	Ema Gagro
Jacques Houdek	Pjerino Ružević	Egon Marić	Melanie M. Acorlor
Jacques Houdek	Martina Milošević	Gordan Gregurović	Neven Stipčić
Jacques Houdek	Mateo Pilat	Ana Cerovac	Antonela Đinđić

== Battle rounds ==
Six artists from each team progressed to the live shows. Each coach pitted two of their twelve artists together as they performed a song of the coach's choice at the same time in a boxing ring-styled stage. After the two artists completed the song, one progressed to the live shows and one was eliminated from the competition. Once the coaches had completed this process, they each had five artists for the live shows.

The battle advisors for these episodes were: Marija Husar and Boris Đurđević working with Indira Levak, Aljoša Šerić and Maja Posavec working with Ivan Dečak, Miro Buljan and Djordija Palić working with Tony Cetinski, and Tihomir Preradović and Marina Đurović Čelić working with Jacques Houdek.

The battle round episodes aired on the 21 and 28 February and 07 and 14 March 2015.

Colour key

Artist won the Battle and advanced to the Live shows
Artist lost the Battle and was eliminated

=== Episode 1 (21 February) ===
The first of four battle rounds premiered on 21 February 2015.

Order	Coach	Artists		Song
1	Indira Levak	Samanta Vrbljanac	Bruna Oberan	"Chain of Fools"
2	Ivan Dečak	Dario Došlić	Ante Brzić	"Crying in the Rain"
3	Tony Cetinski	Jure Brkljača	Romana Lalić Pejković	"Stine"
4	Jacques Houdek	Ema Gagro	Neven Stipčić	"Never Too Much"
5	Ivan Dečak	Daniel Jurišević	Melanija Purić	"Just Give Me a Reason"
6	Tony Cetinski	Andrija Kovačević	Sara Barbarić	"It's Only Love"

=== Episode 2 (28 February) ===
The second of four battle rounds premiered on 28 February 2015.

Order	Coach	Artists		Song
1	Jacques Houdek	Mateo Pilat	Pjerino Ružević	"Titanium"
2	Indira Levak	Mateo Resman	Samanta Bučaj	"Još jednom"
3	Tony Cetinski	Vladimir Matica Mac	Božidarka Matija Čerina	"Cryin'"
4	Ivan Dečak	Elena Stella	Nicole Vidak	"Back to Black"
5	Jacques Houdek	Ana Cerovac	Egon Marić	"Give Me One Reason"
6	Indira Levak	Ivan Županović	Tomislav Užarević	"New York, New York"

=== Episode 3 (07 March) ===
The third of four battle rounds premiered on 7 March 2015.

Order	Coach	Artists		Song
1	Indira Levak	Andrea Mihal	Dora Vestić	"Free Your Mind"
2	Jacques Houdek	Dino Petrić	Gordan Gregurović	"Molitva"
3	Tony Cetinski	Kristian Ordulj	Iva Ajduković	"All Around the World"
4	Jacques Houdek	Antonela Đinđić	Melanie M. Acorlor	"I Follow Rivers"
5	Ivan Dečak	Valentina Trstenjak	Iva Gortan	"Stay with Me Baby"
6	Ivan Dečak	Marin Jurić - Čivro	Azra Kuštrić Skender	"One"

=== Episode 4 (14 March) ===
The fourth of four battle rounds premiered on 14 March 2015.

Order	Coach	Artists		Song
1	Tony Cetinski	Maja Škiljević	Kristina Boban	"Read All About It"
2	Ivan Dečak	Mahir Kapetanović	Dino Purić	"...pola metra iznad zemlje"
3	Indira Levak	Ana Opačak	Zdravka Damjanović	"Bleeding Love"
4	Jacques Houdek	Martina Milošević	Nina Kraljić	"Say Something"
5	Tony Cetinski	Bojan Aleksovski	Alen Bičević	"Wonderful Tonight"
6	Indira Levak	Sven Pfeifer	Karlo Cvetković	"Wake Me Up"

== Live shows ==
=== Results summary ===
Colour key

- Winner
- Runner-up
- Third place
- Artist received the most public votes
- Artist was in the bottom two
- Artist was eliminated

Live show results per week
Artist	Week 1	Week 2	Week 3	Week 4	Week 5	Week 6	
Artist	Week 1	Week 2	Week 3	Week 4	Week 5	Round 1	Round 2
Nina	Saved	—N/a	Saved	Bottom	Saved	Advanced	Winner
Mateo	—N/a	Bottom	Bottom	Saved	Saved	Advanced	Runner-up
Marin	—N/a	Saved	Saved	Saved	Saved	Advanced	Third place
Jure	—N/a	Saved	Saved	Bottom	Saved	Fourth place	Eliminated
Dino	—N/a	Saved	Saved	Saved	Eliminated	Eliminated (Week 5)	
Alen	Saved	—N/a	Bottom	Saved	Eliminated	Eliminated (Week 5)	
Ana	—N/a	Saved	Saved	Bottom	Eliminated	Eliminated (Week 5)	
Iva G.	—N/a	Bottom	Saved	Bottom	Eliminated	Eliminated (Week 5)	
Bruna	Saved	—N/a	Saved	Eliminated	Eliminated (Week 4)		
Ema	Bottom	—N/a	Bottom	Eliminated	Eliminated (Week 4)		
Elena	Saved	—N/a	Bottom	Eliminated	Eliminated (Week 4)		
Sara	Bottom	—N/a	Saved	Eliminated	Eliminated (Week 4)		
Mahir	Bottom	—N/a	Eliminated	Eliminated (Week 3)			
Iva A.	—N/a	Bottom	Eliminated	Eliminated (Week 3)			
Pjerino	—N/a	Bottom	Eliminated	Eliminated (Week 3)			
Karlo	Bottom	—N/a	Eliminated	Eliminated (Week 3)			
Egon	—N/a	Eliminated	Eliminated (Week 2)				
Tomislav	—N/a	Eliminated	Eliminated (Week 2)				
Božidarka	—N/a	Eliminated	Eliminated (Week 2)				
Dario	—N/a	Eliminated	Eliminated (Week 2)				
Daniel	Eliminated	Eliminated (Week 1)					
Dora	Eliminated	Eliminated (Week 1)					
Melanie	Eliminated	Eliminated (Week 1)					
Kristina	Eliminated	Eliminated (Week 1)					

=== Live show details ===
==== Week 1 (21 March) ====
The first live show aired on 21 March 2015.

Order	Team	Artist	Song	Result
1	Team Tony	Sara Barbarić	"Tough Lover"	Bottom
2	Team Tony	Alen Bičević	"Još uvijek sanjam da smo zajedno"	Saved
3	Team Tony	Kristina Boban	"When Love Takes Over"	Eliminated
1	Team Jacques	Ema Gagro	"A Song for You"	Bottom
2	Team Jacques	Melanie M. Acorlor	"Čuvaj me"	Eliminated
3	Team Jacques	Nina Kraljić	"Wicked Game"	Saved
1	Team Indira	Dora Vestić	"Proud Mary"	Eliminated
2	Team Indira	Karlo Cvetković	"Ja bih preživio"	Bottom
3	Team Indira	Bruna Oberan	"Bang Bang"	Saved
1	Team Ivan	Daniel Jurišević	"Run to the Hills"	Eliminated
2	Team Ivan	Mahir Kapetanović	"Sve će to mila moja..."	Bottom
3	Team Ivan	Elena Stella	"Johnny Got a Boom Boom"	Saved

==== Week 2 (28 March) ====
The second live show aired on 28 March 2015.

Order	Team	Artist	Song	Result
1	Team Ivan	Marin Jurić - Čivro	"Hallelujah"	Saved
2	Team Ivan	Iva Gortan	"Set Fire to the Rain"	Bottom
3	Team Ivan	Dario Došlić	"Questo piccollo grande amore"	Eliminated
1	Team Tony	Iva Ajduković	"Domino"	Bottom
2	Team Tony	Jure Brkljača	"Bacila je sve niz rijeku"	Saved
3	Team Tony	Božidarka Matija Čerina	"Sweet Dreams (Are Made of This)"	Eliminated
1	Team Indira	Tomislav Užarević	"Wonderwall"	Eliminated
2	Team Indira	Mateo Resman	"I Kissed a Girl"	Bottom
3	Team Indira	Ana Opačak	"Tempera"	Saved
1	Team Jacques	Egon Marić	"Royals"	Eliminated
2	Team Jacques	Dino Petrić	"Pratim te"	Saved
3	Team Jacques	Pjerino Ružević	"Diamonds"	Bottom

==== Week 3 (04 April) ====
The third live show aired on 4 April 2015.

Order	Team	Artist	Song	Result
1	Team Indira	Ana Opačak	"What a Wonderful World"	Saved
2	Team Indira	Karlo Cvetković	"Let Me Entertain You"	Eliminated
3	Team Indira	Mateo Resman	"Grenade"	Bottom
4	Team Indira	Bruna Oberan	"Hurt"	Saved
1	Team Jacques	Pjerino Ružević	"Tko sam ja da ti sudim"	Eliminated
2	Team Jacques	Ema Gagro	"Pelin i med"	Bottom
3	Team Jacques	Dino Petrić	"Dvije duše"	Saved
4	Team Jacques	Nina Kraljić	"Što te nema"	Saved
1	Team Tony	Alen Bičević	"Freedom"	Bottom
2	Team Tony	Iva Ajduković	"Dođi"	Eliminated
3	Team Tony	Jure Brkljača	"Još i danas zamiriše trešnja"	Saved
4	Team Tony	Sara Barbarić	"It's Raining Men"	Saved
1	Team Ivan	Elena Stella	"Many Rivers to Cross"	Bottom
2	Team Ivan	Marin Jurić - Čivro	"Mjesto za mene"	Saved
3	Team Ivan	Iva Gortan	"I'm Not the Only One"	Saved
4	Team Ivan	Mahir Kapetanović	"Love Me Again"	Eliminated

==== Week 4 (11 April) ====
The fourth live show aired on 11 April 2015.

Opening act: Medley

- Team Jacques: "Stotinama godina"
- Team Tony: "Blago onom ko te ima"
- Team Ivan: "Tremolo"
- Team Indira: "Svijet voli pobjednike"

Order	Team	Artist	Song	Result
1	Team Tony	Jure Brkljača	"Posoljeni zrak i razlivena tinta"	Bottom
2	Team Tony	Sara Barbarić	"You Shook Me All Night Long"	Eliminated
3	Team Tony	Alen Bičević	"Utorak"	Saved
1	Team Ivan	Iva Gortan	"Gdje Dunav ljubi nebo"	Bottom
2	Team Ivan	Marin Jurić - Čivro	"Soldier of Fortune"	Saved
3	Team Ivan	Elena Stella	"Creep"	Eliminated
1	Team Jacques	Nina Kraljić	"She Wolf (Falling to Pieces)"	Bottom
2	Team Jacques	Ema Gagro	"Uptown Funk"	Eliminated
3	Team Jacques	Dino Petrić	"Kad žena zavoli"	Saved
1	Team Indira	Bruna Oberan	"Daleko"	Eliminated
2	Team Indira	Mateo Resman	"Evo zakleću se"	Saved
3	Team Indira	Ana Opačak	"Purple Rain"	Bottom

==== Week 5: Semi-final (18 April) ====
The Semi-final live show aired on 18 April 2015.

Performance with the coach:

- Team Ivan: "Treblebass"
- Team Indira: "Najbolje od svega"
- Team Tony: "Treba imat dušu"
- Team Jacques: "True Colors"

Order	Team	Artist	Song	Result
1	Team Ivan	Iva Gortan	"Addicted to You"	Eliminated
2	Team Ivan	Marin Jurić - Čivro	"Take Me to Church"	Saved
1	Team Indira	Mateo Resman	"Ostala si uvijek ista"	Saved
2	Team Indira	Ana Opačak	"La Vie en rose"	Eliminated
1	Team Tony	Alen Bičević	"Ti si mi u krvi"	Eliminated
2	Team Tony	Jure Brkljača	"Tu noć kad si se udavala"	Saved
1	Team Jacques	Dino Petrić	"Hero"	Eliminated
2	Team Jacques	Nina Kraljić	"Nothing Else Matters"	Saved

==== Week 6: Final (25 April) ====
The Final live show aired on 25 April 2015. Each coach had one artist each in their team, and for the first time in the series, each artist performed three songs: two solo numbers and a duet with their coach.

Opening act: Coaches singing "The Winner Takes It All" by ABBA with their team advisors
Interval act: Top 24 singing "Oprosti" by Gibonni

Order	Team	Artist	First song	Second song (Duet)	Result	Third song	Result	
1	Team Tony	Jure Brkljača	"Brod u boci"	"Ti, samo ti"	Fourth place			
2	Team Ivan	Marin Jurić - Čivro	"Ain't No Sunshine"	"Tango"	Advanced	"I Don't Want to Be"	Third place	108.329
3	Team Jacques	Nina Kraljić	"Beneath Your Beautiful"	"Euphoria"	Advanced	"Zajdi, zajdi"	Winner	194.319
4	Team Indira	Mateo Resman	"Bed of Roses"	"Simply the Best"	Advanced	"Zlatne godine"	Runner-up	114.747

== Elimination Chart ==
=== Overall ===
Color key
Artist's info

- Team Tony
- Team Jacques
- Team Indira
- Team Ivan

Result details

- Winner
- Runner-up
- Third place
- Fourth place
- Artist was saved by the public
- Artist was saved by his/her coach
- Artist was eliminated
- Artist did not perform on that particular week

Live show results per week
Artist	Week 1	Week 2	Week 3	Week 4	Week 5	Finals	
Nina Kraljic	Safe		Safe	Safe	Safe	Safe	Winner
Mateo Resman		Safe	Safe	Safe	Safe	Safe	Runner-up
Marin Juric-Civro		Safe	Safe	Safe	Safe	Safe	3rd place
Jure Brkljaca		Safe	Safe	Safe	Safe	4th place	Eliminated (Finals)
Alen Bicevic	Safe		Safe	Safe	Eliminated	Eliminated (Week 5)	
Ana Opacak		Safe	Safe	Safe	Eliminated	Eliminated (Week 5)	
Dino Pertic		Safe	Safe	Safe	Eliminated	Eliminated (Week 5)	
Iva Gortan		Safe	Safe	Safe	Eliminated	Eliminated (Week 5)	
Bruno Oberan	Safe		Safe	Eliminated	Eliminated (Week 4)		
Elena Stella	Safe		Safe	Eliminated	Eliminated (Week 4)		
Ema Gagro	Safe		Safe	Eliminated	Eliminated (Week 4)		
Sara Barbaric	Safe		Safe	Eliminated	Eliminated (Week 4)		
Iva Ajdukocic		Safe	Eliminated	Eliminated (Week 3)			
Karlo Cvetkovic	Safe		Eliminated	Eliminated (Week 3)			
Mahir Kapetanovic	Safe		Eliminated	Eliminated (Week 3)			
Pjerino Ruzevic		Safe	Eliminated	Eliminated (Week 3)			
Bozidarka Matija Cerina		Eliminated	Eliminated (Week 2)				
Dario Doslic		Eliminated	Eliminated (Week 2)				
Egon Maric		Eliminated	Eliminated (Week 2)				
Tomislav Uzarevic		Eliminated	Eliminated (Week 2)				
Daniel Jurisevic	Eliminated	Eliminated (Week 2)					
Dora Vestic	Eliminated	Eliminated (Week 2)					
Kristina Boban	Eliminated	Eliminated (Week 2)					
Melanie M. Acorlor	Eliminated	Eliminated (Week 2)					
