= Brkljača =

Brkljača is a surname. Notable people with the surname include:

- Jure Brkljača (born 1994), Croatian singer
- Mario Brkljača (born 1985), Croatian footballer
- Marko Brkljača (born 2004), Croatian footballer
