= Marino Vrgoč =

Croatian child singer (born 2015)

- Born: 10 September 2015 (age 10); Ploče, Croatia
- Occupation: Singer
- Years active: 2024–present

Marino Vrgoč (born 10 September 2015) is a Croatian child singer. He began his career as the winner of the first season of The Voice Kids Hrvatska, and then later was selected as the Croatian representative in the Junior Eurovision Song Contest 2025 with the song "Snovi".

== Biography ==
=== Early life ===
Vrgoč was born in Split, Croatia, on 10 September 2015. His mother, Manda, is a teacher. He has three siblings: Tino, Leon, and Antea.

After attending the Nursery School of Ploče, Vrgoč began studying at the Vladimir Nazor Elementary School and its Music Department in his hometown.

=== 2024–2025: The Voice Kids Hrvatska, Junior Eurovision Song Contest, and local activity ===
In 2024, the artist participated in the first season of The Voice Kids Hrvatska, thus launching his professional music career. Under the mentorship of Davor Gobac, he eventually won the competition. His prize was a publishing contract to record a single with Universal Music Group and a family trip.

The Voice Kids Hrvatska performances and results (2024–2025)
| Stage | Song | Result | Ref. |
|---|---|---|---|
| Audition | "Ribari" (by Vinko Coce) | Advanced | |
| Battle Rounds | "Dobri judi" (by Gibonni) | Advanced | |
| Semi-Final | "Parlami d'amore Mariù" (by Cesare Andrea Bixio and Ennio Neri) | Advanced | |
| Final | "Ako me ostaviš" (by Mišo Kovač) | Advanced | |
| Superfinal | "The Great Pretender" (by The Platters) | Winner | |

On 16 April 2025, Vrgoč was revealed as the Croatian artist for the Junior Eurovision Song Contest 2025 in Tbilisi, Georgia, earning the right to be the first representative for the country at the contest since 2014. The announcement took place during the show Kod nas doma. Following an internal selection of six or seven received entries in the summer, the contest song, "Snovi", written by Arjana Kunštek, Ines Prajo, and Vrgoč himself, was released on 10 November. At the end, he and Croatia finished 14th out of 18.

He performed at the Croatian patriotic concert Domu mom at the Arena Zagreb on 11 October 2025, along with artists such as Mate Bulić, Miroslav Škoro, Jacques Houdek, Tiho Orlić, and others.

== Videography ==
=== Music videos ===
| Title | Year | Director(s) | Ref. |
|---|---|---|---|
| "Snovi" | 2025 | —N/a | |

Awards and achievements
| Preceded by Josie with "Game Over" | Croatia in the Junior Eurovision Song Contest; 2025 | Succeeded by TBD |
