= The Voice Hrvatska =

Croatian television reality singing competition

- Created by: John de Mol Jr. Roel van Velzen
- Based on: The Voice of Holland by: John de Mol Jr.; Roel van Velzen
- Presented by: Iva Šulentić; Ivan Vukušić
- Judges: Davor Gobac (3- ) Damir Urban (4-); Dino Jelusick (4-); Vanna (3-); Massimo Savić (3); Ivan Dečak (1-3); Indira Levak (1-2); Tony Cetinski (1-2); Jacques Houdek (1-2)
- Country of origin: Croatia
- Original language: Croatian
- No. of seasons: 4
- No. of episodes: 53

Production
- Producers: Talpa (2015-2016); ITV Studios (2019-present)
- Running time: 90 mins

Original release
- Network: HRT
- Release: 17 January 2015 – present

The Voice Hrvatska (formerly The Voice – Najljepši glas Hrvatske) is a reality singing competition and version of The Voice of Holland for Croatia. It is part of the international syndication The Voice based on the reality singing competition launched in the Netherlands, created by Dutch television producer John de Mol Jr..

One of the important premises of the show is the quality of the singing talent. Four coaches, themselves popular performing artists, train the talents in their group and occasionally perform with them. Talents are selected in blind auditions, where the coaches cannot see, but only hear the auditioner.

== Format ==
The series consists of three phases: a blind audition, a battle phase, and live performance shows. Four judges/coaches, all noteworthy recording artists, choose teams of contestants through a blind audition process. Each judge has the length of the auditioner's performance (about one minute) to decide if he or she wants that singer on his or her team; if two or more judges want the same singer (as happens frequently), the singer has the final choice of coach. Each team of singers is mentored and developed by its respective coach. In the second stage, called the battle phase, coaches have two of their team members battle against each other directly by singing the same song together, with the coach choosing which team member to advance from each of four individual "battles" into the first live round. Within that first live round, the surviving acts from each team again compete head-to-head, with a combination of public and jury vote deciding who advances onto the next round. In the final phase, the remaining contestants (top 8) compete against each other in live broadcasts. The television audience and the coaches have equal say 50/50 in deciding who moves on to the final 4 phase. With one team member remaining for each coach, the (final 4) contestants compete against each other in the finale with the outcome decided solely by public vote.

HRT opened the applications on 10 March 2023, and set the premiere of the fourth season on 11 November 2023. The season consisted of 12 episodes with the final airing on 27 January 2024.

== Coaches and hosts ==
=== Coaches ===
Coach	Seasons			
Coach	1	2	3	4
Jacques Houdek				
Indira Levak				
Tony Cetinski				
Ivan Dečak				
Davor Gobac				
Vanna				
Massimo Savić †				
Damir Urban				
Dino Jelusick				

Coaches gallery

Ivan Dečak (2015–2016, 2019–2020)

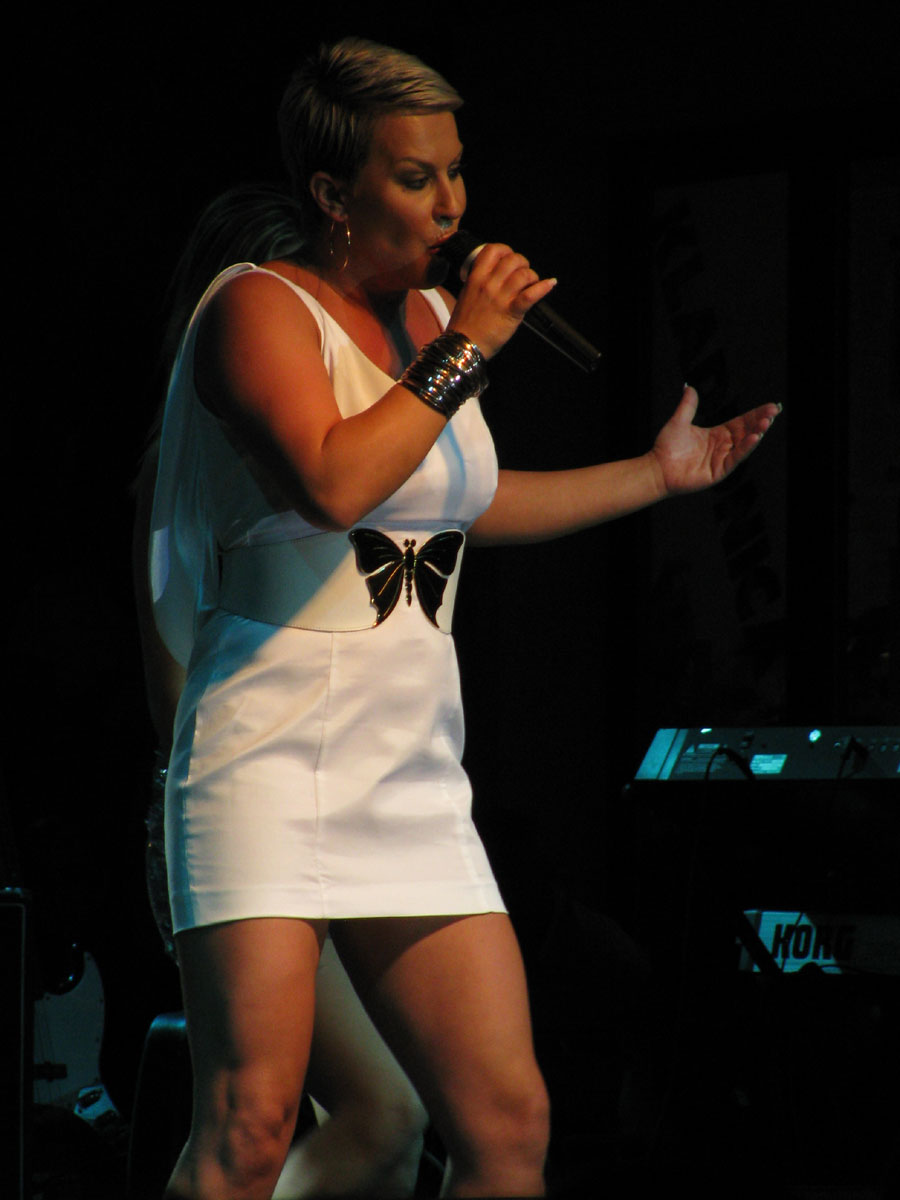
Indira Levak (2015–2016)

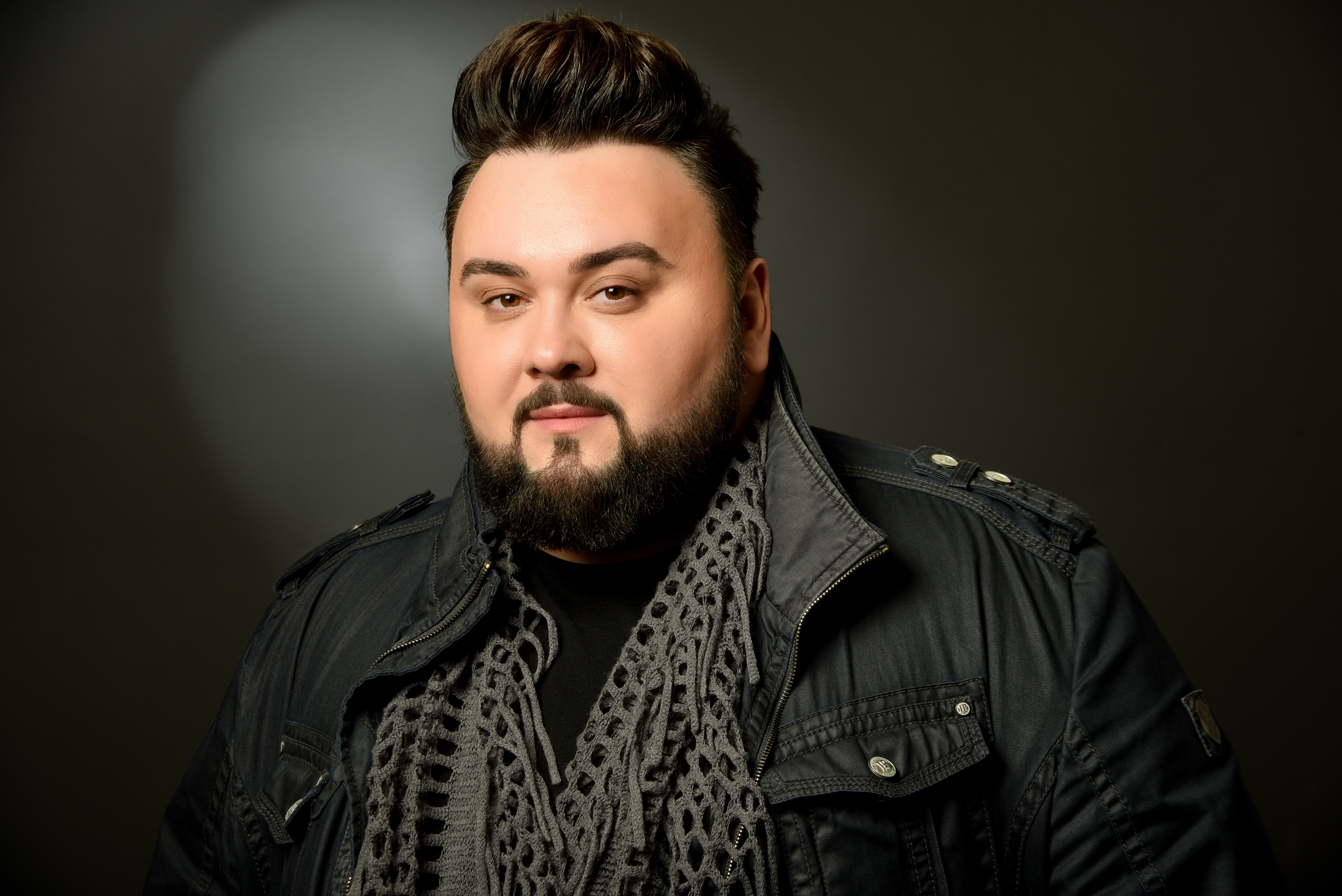
Jacques Houdek (2015–2016)

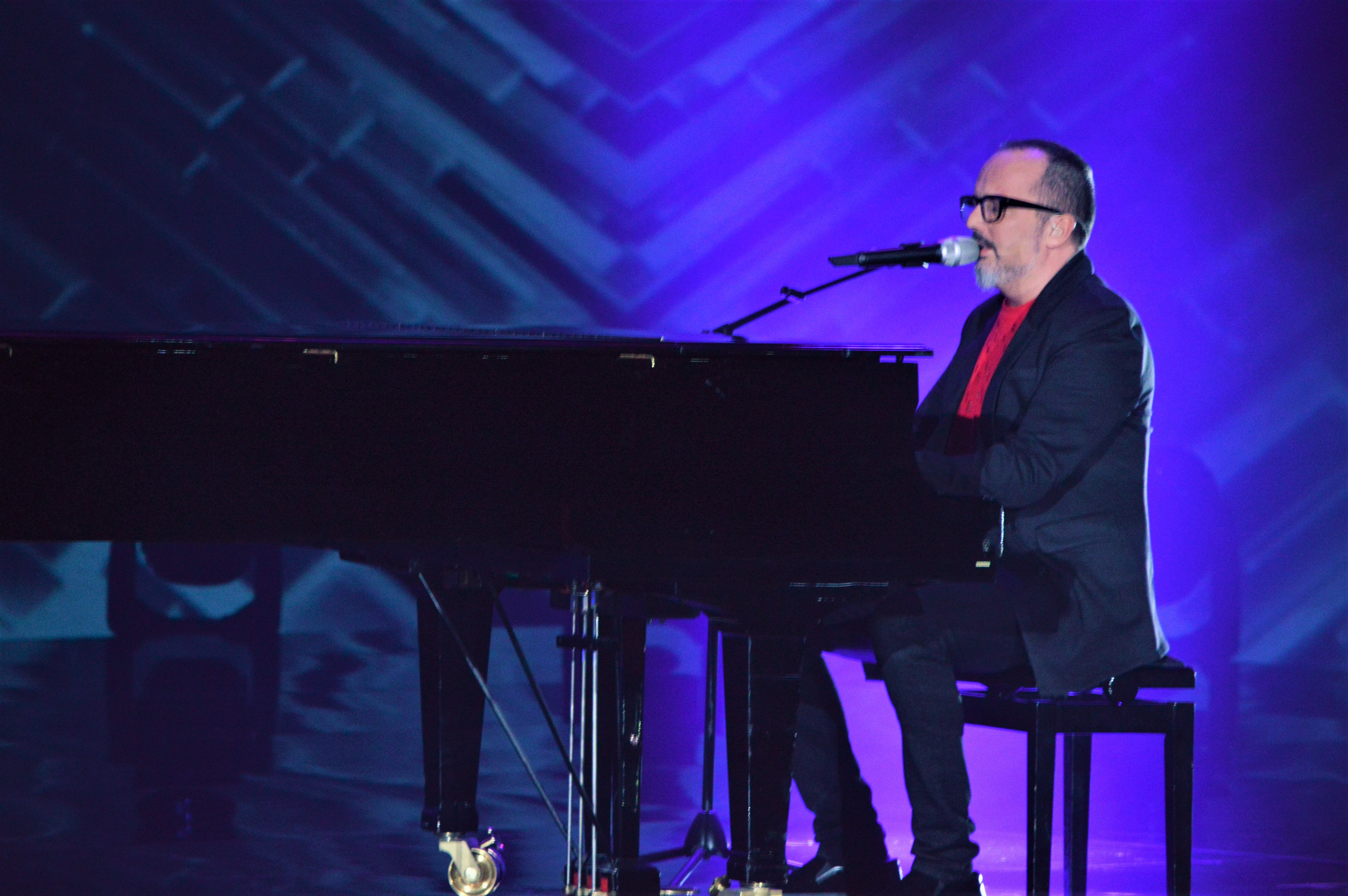
Tony Cetinski (2015–2016)

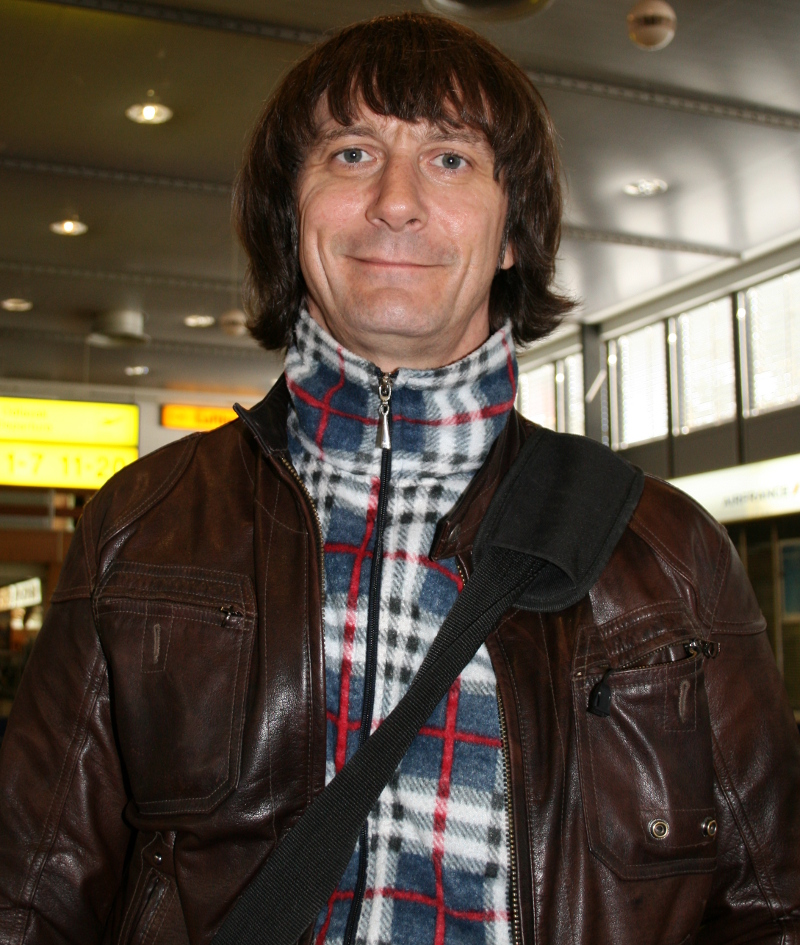
Davor Gobac (2019– )

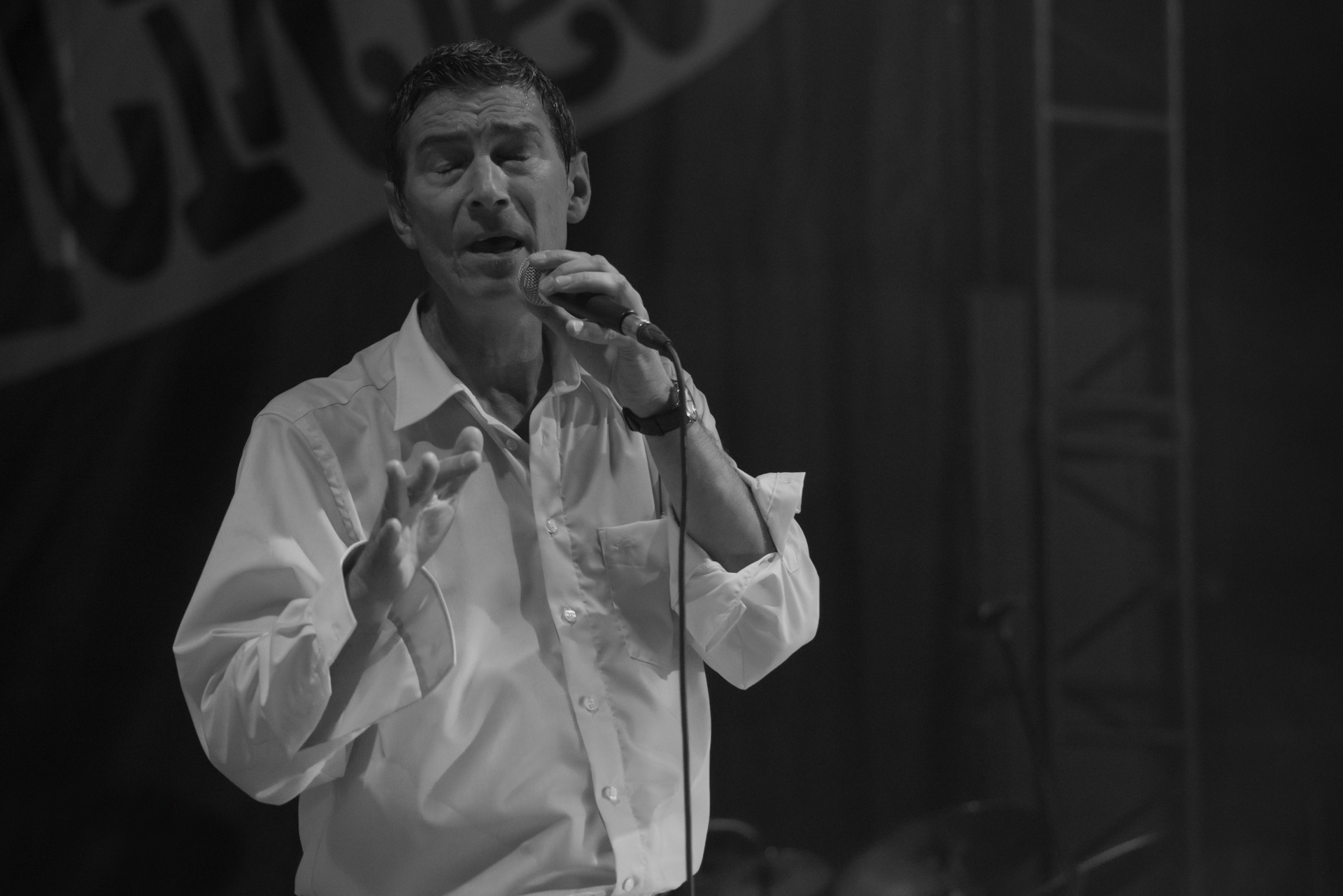
Massimo Savić^{†} (2019–2020)

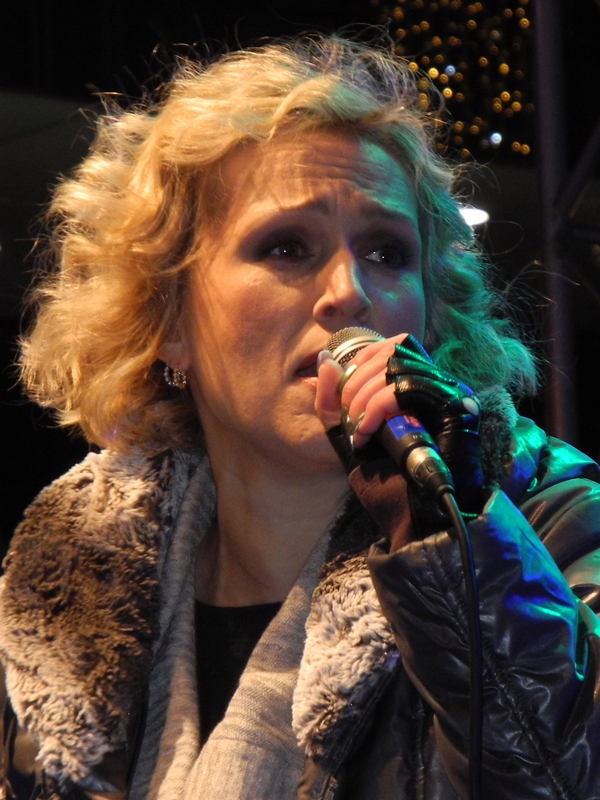
Vanna (2019–)

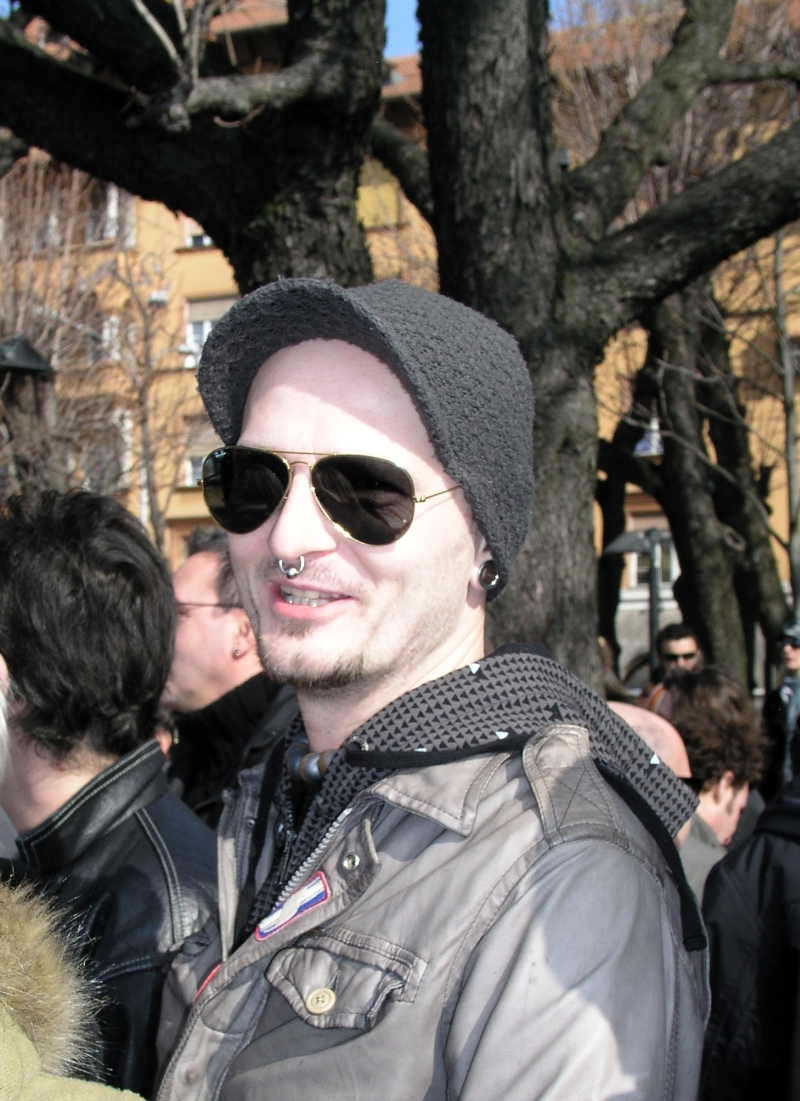
Damir Urban (2023–)

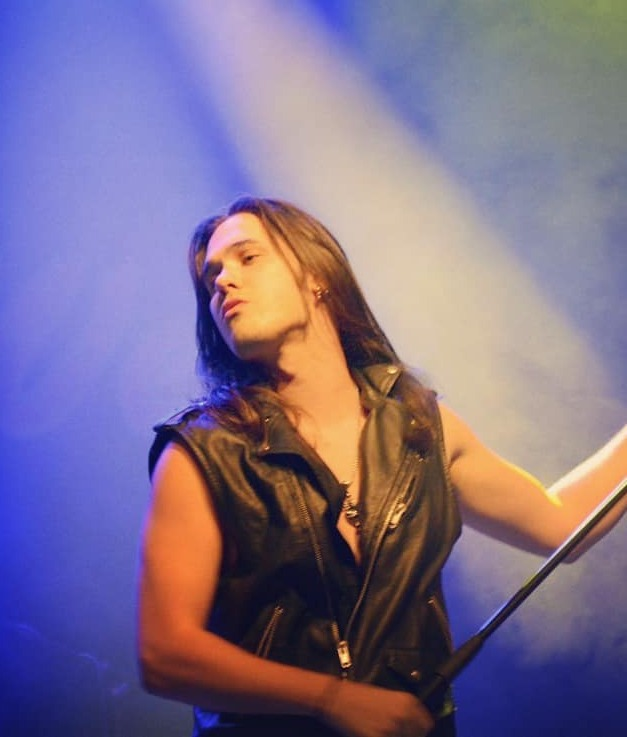
Dino Jelusick (2023–)

=== Hosts ===
Coach	Seasons			
Coach	1	2	3	4
Ivan Vukušić				
Iva Šulentić				

== Season summary ==
Season	Aired	Winner	Runner-up	Third place	Fourth place	Winning coach	Presenters	Coaches (chairs' order)			
Season	Aired	Winner	Runner-up	Third place	Fourth place	Winning coach	Presenters	1	2	3	4
1	2015	Nina Kraljić	Mateo Resman	Marin Jurić Čivro	Jure Brkljača	Jacques Houdek	Ivan Vukušić, Iva Šulentić	Jacques	Indira	Tony	Ivan
2	2016	Ruža Janjiš	Edgar Rupena	Alen Đuras	Vedran Ljubenko	Indira Levak	Ivan Vukušić, Iva Šulentić	Jacques	Indira	Tony	Ivan
3	2019–2020	Vinko Ćemeraš	Filip Rudan	Albina Grčić	Bernarda Bobovečki	Davor Gobac	Ivan Vukušić, Iva Šulentić	Gobac	Massimo	Vanna	Ivan
4	2023–2024	Martin Kosovec	Ana Širić	Luka Novokmet	Jakov P. Rihtar	Vanna	Ivan Vukušić, Iva Šulentić	Gobac	Urban	Vanna	Dino

=== Coaches' teams ===
Winner
Runner-up

Third place
Fourth place

Season	Coaches and their finalists			
1	Jacques Houdek	Indira Levak	Tony Cetinski	Ivan Dečak
1	Nina Kraljić; Dino Petrić; Ema Gagro; Pjerino Ružević	Mateo Resman; Ana Opačak; Bruna Oberan; Karlo Cvetković	Jure Brkljača; Alen Bičević; Sara Barbarić; Iva Ajduković	Marin Jurić Čivro; Iva Gortan; Elena Stella; Mahir Kapetanović
2	Alen Đuras; Petra Vurušić; Rea Matić; Ivana Sutlović	Ruža Janjiš; Eni Jurišić; Lucija Lučić; Matea Dujmović	Edgar Rupena; Monika Perić; Ana Androić Knežević; Ivona Šimunić	Vedran Ljubenko; Tajana Belina; Stefany Žužić; Vjekoslav Ključarić
3	Davor Gobac	Massimo Savić	Vanna	Ivan Dečak
3	Vinko Ćemeraš; Dora Juričić; Josip Palameta; Tea Lovreković	Albina Grčić; Adriana Vidović; Maria Florencia Celani; Petra Roško	Filip Rudan; Darija Ramljak; Goran Orešković; Mija Mihanović	Bernarda Bobovečki; Jakob Grubišak; Karlo Vudrić; Vjekoslav Banovčić
4	Davor Gobac	Damir Urban	Vanna	Dino Jelusick
4	Luka Novokmet; Sandro Bjelanović; Nikolina Stipić; Gabriela Braičić	Ana Širić; Toni Šimonović; Petar Brkljačić; Ivana Jukić	Martin Kosovec; Sergej Božić; Laura Sučec; Teo Kifer	Jakov Peruško Rihtar; Natali Radovčić; Duška Brčić Šušak; Marko Vukić

== Kids version ==
The Voice Kids Hrvatska
- Genre: Reality competition
- Created by: John de Mol Jr.
- Based on: The Voice Kids by John de Mol Jr.
- Directed by: Ivan Miladinov
- Presented by: Iva Šulentić; Ivan Vukušić
- Judges: Davor Gobac (1- ); Mia Dimšić (1- ); Vanna (1–); Marko Tolja (1–)
- Country of origin: Croatia
- Original language: Croatian
- No. of seasons: 2
- No. of episodes: 18

Original release
- Network: HRT 1
- Release: 28 December 2024 – present

Related
- The Voice Hrvatska

The Voice Kids Hrvatska is a Croatian singing reality competition television series, a spin-off of The Voice Hrvatska and the Croatian entry in The Voice Kids global television franchise. It was used as the Croatian national selection for the Junior Eurovision Song Contest 2025.

The premiere of the series, originally slated for 21 December 2024, was moved to 28 December due to Zagreb school stabbing that occurred a day earlier.

=== Production ===
HRT first confirmed the series in early 2023. The auditions were opened in May 2024 for all aspiring competitors aged 8 to 15. In October 2024, the judging panel was confirmed to consist of Davor Gobac, Vanna, Mia Dimšić, and Marko Tolja. The series is hosted by Iva Šulentić and Ivan Vukušić.

=== Coaches ===
The coaches for the first season were announced to be Davor Gobac, Vanna (both of whom served as coaches for the adult version), Mia Dimšić, and Marko Tolja (both of whom debuted as coaches).

Coaches gallery

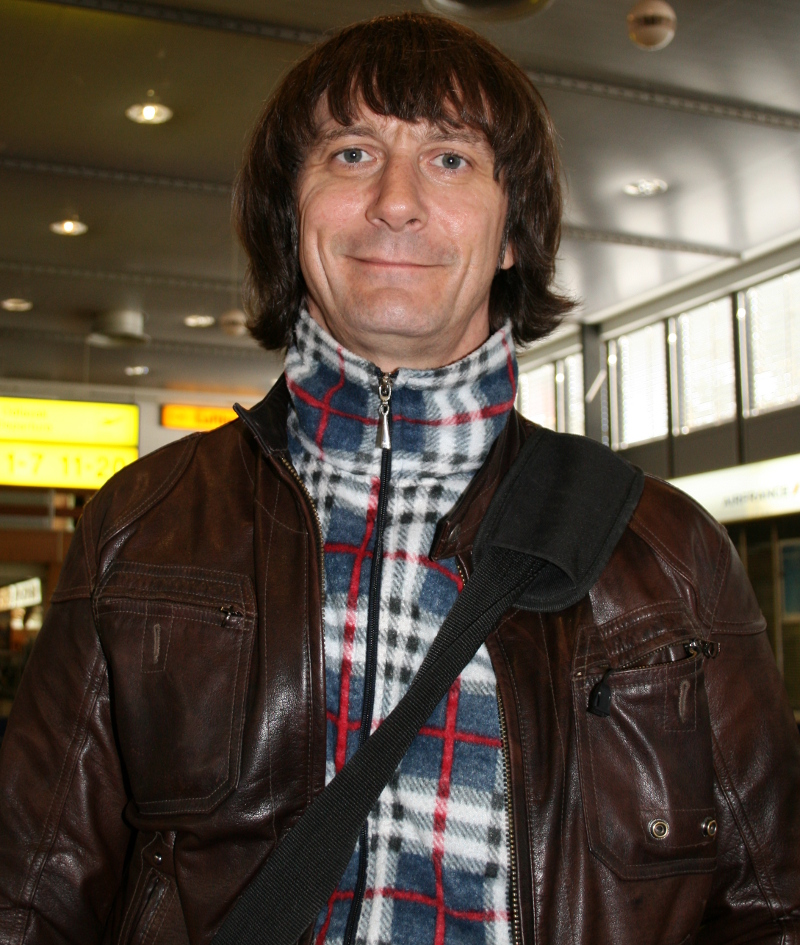
Davor Gobac

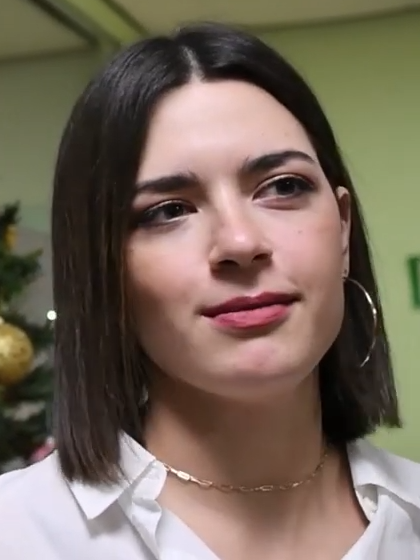
Mia Dimšić

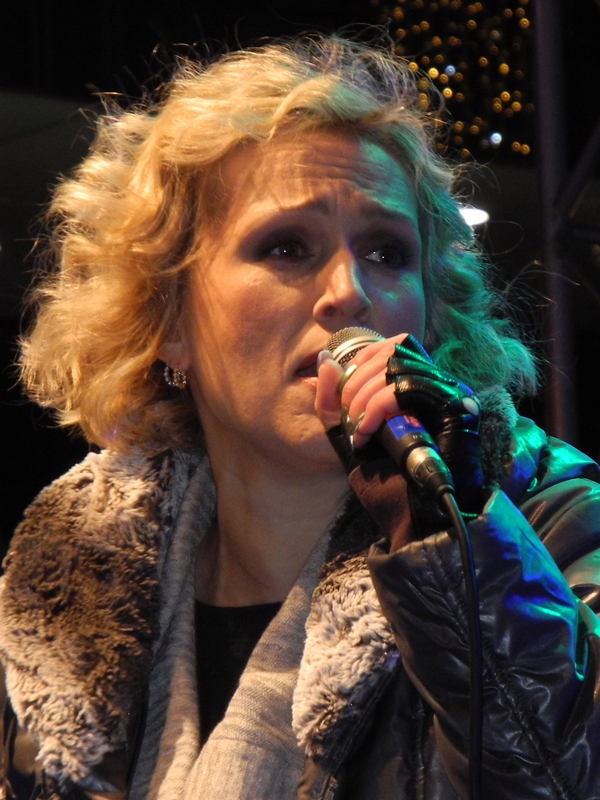
Vanna

Coach	Seasons	
Coach	1	2
Davor Gobac		
Vanna		
Mia Dimšić		
Marko Tolja		

=== Season summary ===
The Voice Kids Hrvatska series overview
Season	Aired	Winner	Runner-up	Third place	Fourth place	Winning coach	Presenters	Coaches (chairs' order)			
Season	Aired	Winner	Runner-up	Third place	Fourth place	Winning coach	Presenters	1	2	3	4
1	2024–25	Marino Vrgoč	Luana Špelić	Sara Zeba	Mira Oštrić	Davor Gobac	Iva Šulentić & Ivan Vukušić	Gobac	Mia	Vanna	Tolja
2	2025–26	Nikol Kutnjak	Ana Ajduković	David Šimunov	Tihana Marković	Davor Gobac	Iva Šulentić & Ivan Vukušić	Gobac	Mia	Vanna	Tolja

=== Coaches' teams ===
Winner
Runner-up
Third place
Fourth place

Season	Coaches and their finalists			
1	Davor Gobac	Mia Dimšić	Vanna	Marko Tolja
1	Marino Vrgoč; Nina Vujević; Ena Nižić; Lota Knežević	Luana Špelić; Leonardo Rados; Hana Bakić; Sofia Makar	Sara Zeba; Petra Duduković; Ameli Dinarina-Šimić; Erika Karačić Šoljić	Mira Oštrić; Pia Matković; Eliza Andrejević; Vida Magdalenić
2	Nikol Kutnjak; Franka Prižmić; Emily Maras; Marko Stanić	Ana Ajduković; Franka Žužić; Leon Jambrek; Lorena Mioč	David Šimunov; Niko Huljev Žuvan; Dorijan Novoselac; Mia Staraj	Tihana Marković; Tia Paola Pervanić; Josip Makar; Viktor Kolmar

== See also ==
- The Voice (franchise)
