= Vrgoč =

Vrgoč is a surname. Notable people with the surname include:

- Branko Vrgoč (born 1989), Croatian footballer
- Marino Vrgoč (born 2015), Croatian singer
