= My Friend (Jacques Houdek song) =

2017 song by Jacques Houdek

Single by Jacques Houdek
- Released: 2 March 2017
- Recorded: 2016
- Genre: Operatic pop
- Length: 3:00
- Songwriters: Jacques Houdek; Tony Roberth Malm; Siniša Reljić; Arijana Kunštek; Fabrizio Laucella; Ines Prajo

Jacques Houdek singles chronology
"Kad nekoga voliš" (2017)	"My Friend" (2017)

Music video
- "My Friend" on YouTube

Eurovision Song Contest 2017 entry
- Country: Croatia
- Artist: Jacques Houdek
- Languages: English; Italian
- Composers: Jacques Houdek; Tony Roberth Malm; Siniša Reljić
- Lyricists: Jacques Houdek; Arjana Kunštek; Fabrizio Laucella; Ines Prajo

Finals performance
- Semi-final result: 8th
- Semi-final points: 141
- Final result: 13th
- Final points: 128

Entry chronology
- ◄ "Lighthouse" (2016)
- "Crazy" (2018) ►

"My Friend" is a song performed by Croatian singer Jacques Houdek. The song represented Croatia in the Eurovision Song Contest 2017. It was released as a digital download on 2 March 2017, and is the first Croatian entry to contain lyrics in the Italian language. Houdek alternates between singing in Italian using his chest register and in English using his head and falsetto registers.

== Eurovision Song Contest ==
On 17 February 2017, Houdek was announced as the Croatian entrant to the Eurovision Song Contest 2017. On 20 February, it was confirmed that the song he'd be singing was called "My Friend". The song was later released on 2 March. Croatia competed in the second half of the second semi-final at the Eurovision Song Contest.

== Track listing ==
Digital download
No.	Title	Length
1.	"My Friend"	3:00

Digital download – Instrumental
No.	Title	Length
1.	"My Friend (Instrumental)"	3:02

== Charts ==
=== Weekly charts ===
Chart (2017)	Peak position
Croatia (HR Top 40)	1

== Release history ==
Region	Date	Format	Label	Ref.
Worldwide	2 March 2017	Digital download	Croatia Records	
