= Eni Jurišić =

Croatian singer

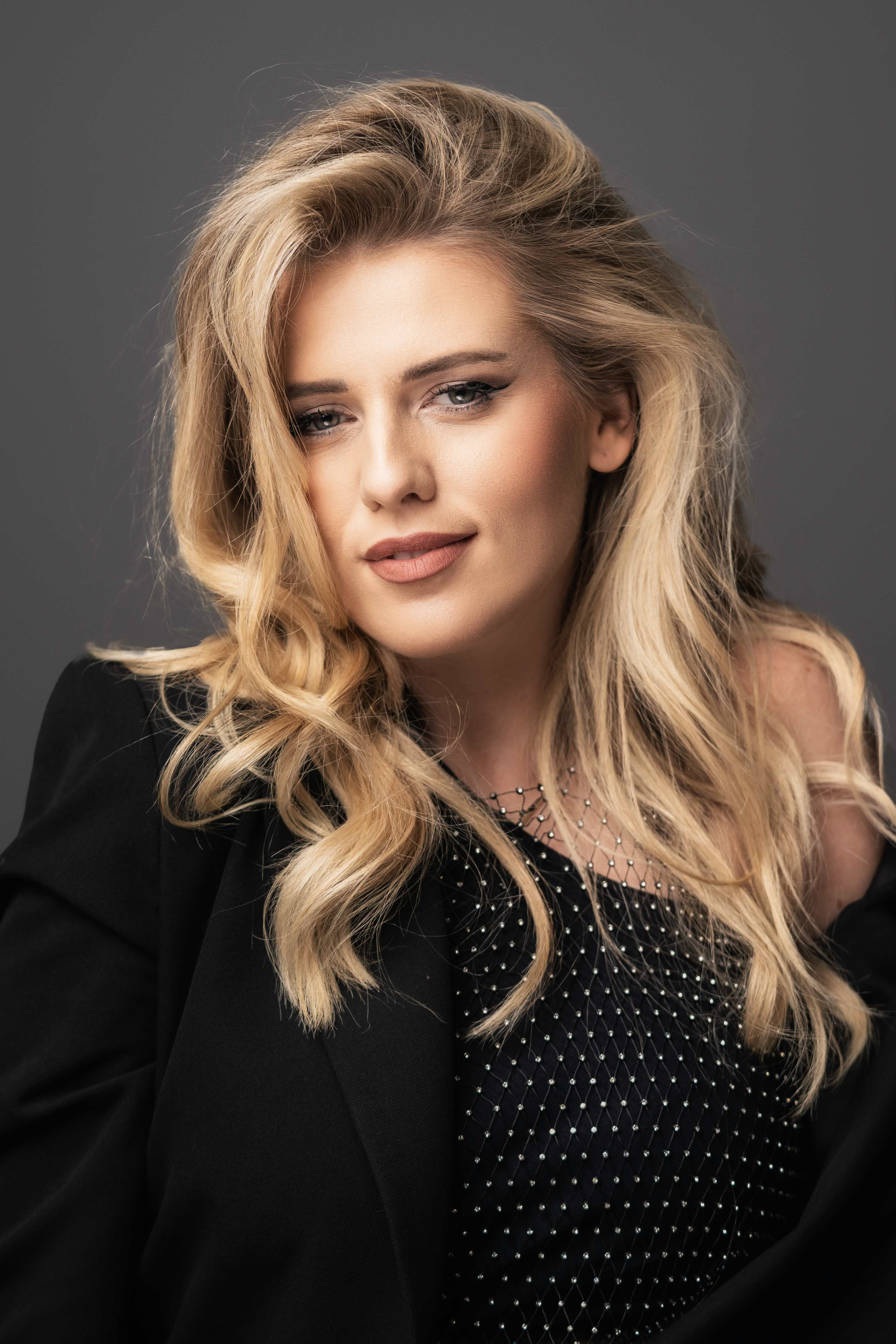
- Jurišić in 2023

Background information
- Also known as: Eni
- Born: 22 June 1990 (age 36); Rijeka, SR Croatia, SFR Yugoslavia
- Genres: Pop
- Occupation: Singer
- Years active: 2015–present
- Label: Aquarius Records

Eni Jurišić (born 22 June 1990), known professionally as Eni, is a Croatian singer and songwriter. She rose to fame by participating in the second season of The Voice Hrvatska. Jurišić is most known for her collaboration with Matija Cvek on the song "Trebaš li me".

== Life and career ==
In early 2017 Jurišić released her first single titled "Prije nego nestane" which featured vocals from Croatian singer Vjekoslav Kljućarić. The song became her first song to chart in the Croatian HR Top 40 chart. "Ljetni blues" was released as her second single. In February 2021, after a two years long hiatus, Jurišić released her comeback single "Gubim dah". The song achieved moderate success by peaking at number 33 on the national HR Top 40 chart. A year later, in early 2022, Jurišić released "Trebaš li me", a collaboration with Matija Cvek. On 15 February 2022, on the newly introduced Billboard Croatia Songs chart, "Trebaš li me" was the highest-charting song by a Croatian act, debuting at number five. The track reached number one on the HR Top 40 becoming Jurišić's first chart topper. At the 2023 edition of the Cesarica Awards, Jurišić won the Song of The Year award with "Trebaš li me". The song received two additional Songs of The Year awards at the 2023 editions of Zlatni Studio and Top.HR Music Awards, respectively.

On 9 December 2022, Jurišić was announced as one of the 18 participants in Dora 2023, the national contest in Croatia to select the country's Eurovision Song Contest 2023 entry, with the song "Kreni dalje". As a result, she placed sixth with a total of 71 points and didn't earn the right to represent Croatia at the Eurovision Song Contest 2023. After being performed at Dora 2023, "Kreni dalje" re-peaked on HR Top 40 by reaching number seven.

== Personal life ==
Since early 2017 Jurišić has been in a relationship with Croatian singer Vjekoslav Ključarić. After five years of dating, Jurišić and Ključarić became engaged in September 2021. In May 2022 the couple got married on Kljućarić's home island Krk.

Jurišić is the daughter of Croatian pop singer Jozefina Jurišić.

== Discography ==
=== Singles ===
Title	Year	Peak chart positions		Album
Title	Year	CRO		Album
Title	Year	Top 40	Songs	Album
"Prije nego nestane" (with Vjekoslav Kljućarić)	2017	8	—	Non-album singles
"Kao jedno"	2017	—	—	Non-album singles
"Ljetni blues"	2017	11	—	Non-album singles
"Pepeo i prah"	2017	—	—	Non-album singles
"Do ludila"	2019	12	—	Non-album singles
"Gubim dah"	2021	33	—	Non-album singles
"Trebaš li me" (with Matija Cvek)	2022	1	3	Non-album singles
"Kreni dalje"	2023	7	—	Non-album singles
"—" denotes a single that did not chart or was not released.

== Awards and nominations ==
Year	Association	Category	Nominee / work	Result	Ref.
2023	Cesarica	Song of the Year	"Trebaš li me"	Won	
2023	Zlatni Studio	Song of the Year	"Trebaš li me"	Won	
2023	Top.HR Music Awards	Song of the Year	"Trebaš li me"	Won	
