= Indira Levak =

Croatian singer (born 1973)

Indira Forza
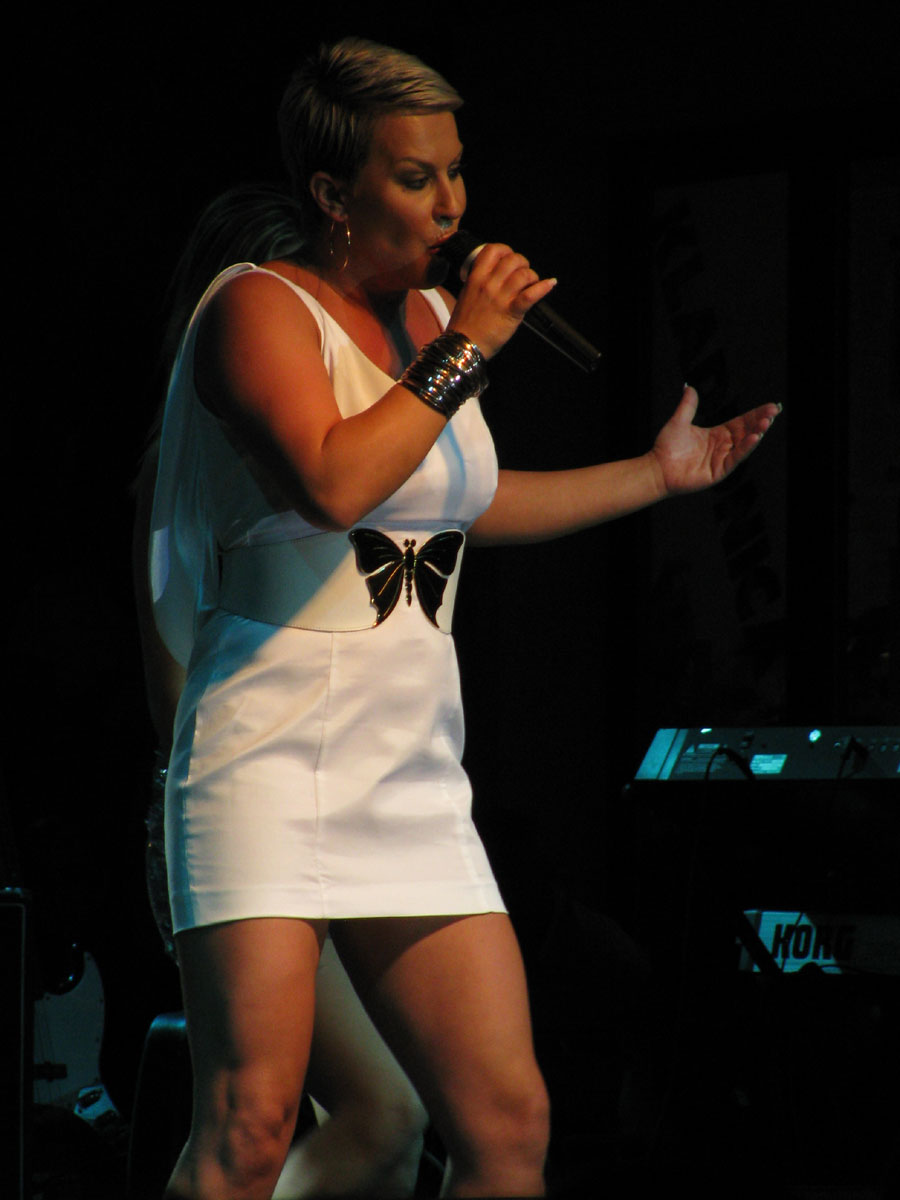

Background information
- Also known as: Indira Mujkić; Indira Levak
- Born: Indira Vladić; 15 September 1973 (age 52); Županja, SR Croatia, SFR Yugoslavia
- Genres: Dance music
- Occupation: Singer
- Instrument: Vocals
- Years active: 1996–present
- Formerly of: Colonia
- Spouses: Narcis Mujkić (m. 2001; div. 2010); Miroslav Levak (m. 2014; div. 2024)

Indira Levak (née Vladić; born 15 September 1973), also known by her stage name Indira Forza, is a Croatian singer. She was the lead vocalist of a Croatian dance music group, Colonia.

== Biography ==
Indira was born to Croatian father Franjo and Bosniak mother Ismeta on 15 September 1973 in Županja. She was named after then-Prime Minister of India Indira Gandhi. At the age of twelve she became a member of Županja Brass Band, where she played clarinet for thirteen years. In eighth grade she founded a band with four colleagues - "Forever young". From 1996 to 2017 she was a member of popular dance group Colonia.

She was married to Narcis Mujkić, but they divorced. She met Miroslav Levak in 2013, whom she was married ro between 2014 and 2024. In 2015 and 2016, she was a judge of Croatian version of The Voice.

== Discography ==
=== With Colonia ===
- Vatra i led (1997)
- Ritam ljubavi (1999)
- Jača nego ikad (2000)
- Milijun milja od nigdje (2001)
- Izgubljeni svijet (2002)
- Dolazi oluja (2003)
- Najbolje od svega (2005)
- Do kraja (2007)
- Pod sretnom zvijezdom (2008)
- X (2010)
- Tvrđava (2013)
- Feniks (2015)

=== Solo ===
- Valkira (2018)
- Atlantida (2022)

== Filmography ==
=== Television roles ===
Year	Film	Role	Notes
2005	Bitange i princeze	Star	Guest star in one episode
