= Jacques Houdek =

Croatian recording artist (born 1981)

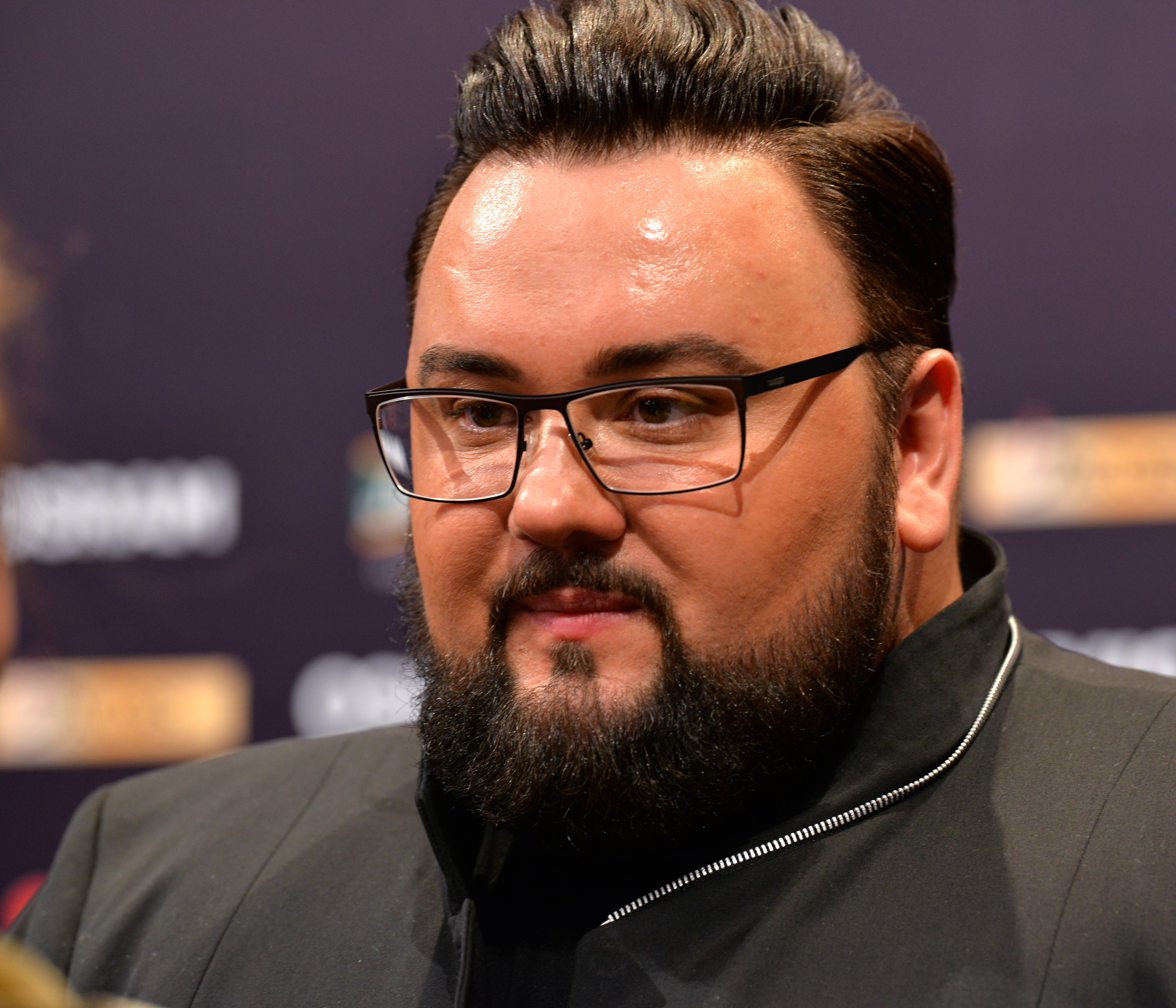

Background information
- Also known as: Gospodin Glas (Mr. Voice)
- Born: Željko Houdek; 15 April 1981 (age 45); Velika Gorica, SR Croatia, Yugoslavia
- Genres: Pop; soul; R'n'B; gospel; swing; jazz; blues
- Years active: 2000–present
- Website: jacqueshoudek.com

Jacques Houdek (born Željko Houdek; 15 April 1981) is a Croatian recording artist who represented Croatia in the Eurovision Song Contest 2017 with the song "My Friend". Houdek began his professional solo career in 2000 and has since released many recordings and albums out which 13 have been certified silver (five times), gold, platinum and diamond (once). Houdek is one of the mentors in the Croatian version of the TV talent show The Voice. During show's first season, he mentored the winner Nina Kraljić. Aside from Croatian, he has sung and recorded in English, Italian, German, Spanish, French, Slovene, Macedonian, and Māori language.

== Early life and education ==
Jacques Houdek was born as Željko Houdek on 14 April 1981 in Velika Gorica. His last name is of Czech origin. After finishing elementary music school (piano department), Houdek enrolled in two high schools, music (solo singing department) and vocational hairdressing. He also attended singing lessons with professor Viktorija Badrov who wanted him to become an opera singer. After finishing high schools in 2001, he enrolled in prestigious Berklee College of Music, honing his singing in seminars in France, Greece and Italy. Houdek continued to build up his knowledge on Berklee seminars in Europe, where he had the opportunity to be mentored by Donna McElroy, a Grammy Award nominee.

== Career ==
Houdek held his first solo concert on 19 February 2000 in Zagreb club SAX! where he performed covers of various songs. His first single, the song "Čarolija" (Magic), was released in 2002 and performed by Houdek at Dora, Croatia's national competition for entry to the Eurovision Song Contest. There he was noticed by maestro Zdravko Šljivac who offered him a collaboration and publicly praised him by saying that a singer such as Houdek is born once every 300 years. The next month, Houdek signed an exclusive contract with Croatia Records, the leading music publisher in the region, with whom he has produced 13 albums. In 2004, he provided the singing voice of Aladdin for the Croatian dub of the Aladdin franchise, with Dušan Bućan voicing the character for the dialogues.

During campaign for 2007 parliamentary election, Houdek sang party anthem "HDZ zna" (HDZ Knows) for the conservative Croatian Democratic Union (HDZ) which was at the time ran by Ivo Sanader. He later also sang for the mayoral campaign of the populist Milan Bandić. Houdek said in an interview for Jutarnji list that he is apolitical and that those were just professional engagements as any other. In the 2019 presidential election, he supported independent candidate Miroslav Škoro.

In January 2011, Houdek placed fourth in the finals of the Open Mic UK singing contest held in London's O2 Arena. He also participated in the British TV show X Factor, where he was given the nickname "Croatian Sensation" and entered the top 100 candidates. He was unable to continue his participation in the contest because he did not receive a work permit in time.

In February 2017, Houdek was selected to represent Croatia at the Eurovision Song Contest in Kyiv, Ukraine. He qualified for the final, achieving eighth place in the second semi-final and eventually 13th place in the grand final with the song "My Friend".

Over the years, he has performed in the Zagreb's Gavella and Komedija theaters, Lincoln Center for the Performing Arts, on the occasion of the tenth anniversary of his career, the Croatian National Theatre in Zagreb, and has sold out solo concert in Vatroslav Lisinski Concert Hall for five times.

== Controversy ==
In 2005, Houdek said in an interview for the Tena magazine that "gay and lesbian population cannot be equal with other citizens because it means a return to Sodom and Gomorrah", and has called same-sex unions "sick" for which he was named the "Homophobe of the Year" in 2006 in a selection organised by the main Croatian LGBT portal Gay.hr. In a report from 2005, the International Lesbian, Gay, Bisexual, Trans and Intersex Association (ILGA) listed him as "a public figure who gave homophobic statements". In 2011, Houdek was nominated for the title "Homophobe of the Decade" by the LGBT Zagreb Pride organisation which called him "without doubt the biggest homophobe in Croatian showbiz". In response, Houdek published a public statement on Facebook titled "Love and Music are My Driving Forces" in which he expressed his regret for being included in the selection, adding that he was gay-friendly and had nothing against love of any kind.

== Private life ==
Houdek is married to Brigita Krkač since 2006 with whom he has two children, daughter Sofija (b. 2006) and son David (b. 2013).

== Discography ==
=== Studio albums ===
Title	Details
Čarolija	Released: 29 March 2004; Label: Croatia Records; Format: Digital download, CD
Kad si sretan	Released: 7 June 2005; Label: Croatia Records; Format: Digital download, CD
Živim za to	Released: 26 April 2006; Label: Croatia Records; Format: Digital download, CD
Idemo u zoološki vrt	Released: 26 November 2008; Label: Croatia Records; Format: Digital download, CD
Crno i bijelo	Released: 1 December 2008; Label: Croatia Records; Format: Digital download, CD
Najveći Božićni Hitovi	Released: 30 November 2009; Label: Croatia Records; Format: Digital download, CD
Meni za ljubav	Released: 25 May 2012; Label: Croatia Records; Format: Digital download, CD
Tko je, srce, u te dirn'o?	Released: 12 July 2016; Label: Croatia Records; Format: Digital download, CD

=== Live albums ===
Title	Details
Live in Gavella	Released: 9 September 2007; Label: Croatia Records; Format: Digital download, CD
Live in SAX!	Released: 16 October 2008; Label: Croatia Records; Format: Digital download, CD
Live!	Released: 24 August 2010; Label: Croatia Records; Format: Digital download, CD

=== Compilation albums ===
Title	Details
Za posebne trenutke	Released: 14 December 2007; Label: Croatia Records; Format: Digital download, CD
Najljepše ljubavne pjesme	Released: 1 November 2010; Label: Croatia Records; Format: Digital download, CD
The Best of Collection	Released: 22 April 2015; Label: Croatia Records; Format: Digital download, CD

=== Singles ===
==== As lead artist ====
Title	Year	Peak chart positions	Album
Title	Year	CRO	Album
"Slap Ljubavi"	2016	—	Non-album singles
"Tugo Moja"	2016	—	Non-album singles
"Kad nekoga voliš"	2017	—	Non-album singles
"My Friend"	2017	1	Non-album singles
"Čista umjetnost" (with Nina Kraljić)	2019	25	Non-album singles
"Teret"	2020	4	Non-album singles
"Srce pamti zauvijek"	2020	9	Non-album singles
"Život"	2021	22	Non-album singles
"—" denotes a single that did not chart or was not released.

==== As featured artist ====
Title	Year	Album
"Brazil" (Motiwwwo featuring Jacques Houdek)	2014	Non-album single

== Awards and recognitions ==
Four-time winner of the Croatian music award Porin.

- Best new artist
- Best performance by a male singer
- Best album of children's music
- Best Christmas-themed album

Porin nominations:

- Hit of the year
- Best pop album
- Best vocal collaboration
- Best album of tambura music

== Festival awards ==
- Bihaćki festival (2nd and 3rd award), 2004
- Melodije Kvarnera (Grand Prix), 2004
- Banjalučki festival (Best vocal performance), 2005
- Radijski festival BiH (Best Croatian performer), 2005
- Bihaćki festival (Best vocal performance), 2006
- Krapinski festival (2nd jury prize), 2007
- Radio M, BiH (Best Croatian performer), 2008
- Mostar (Grand Prix), 2009
- Budva (Best arrangement and 3rd jury prize), 2009
- Ohrid fest (1st jury prize), 2009
- HRF (Musical editors' award), 2009
- CMC festival (Most played song of the year), 2010
- Narodni radio (TOP 10 songs of 2016), 2017

== TV, concert and other professional achievements ==
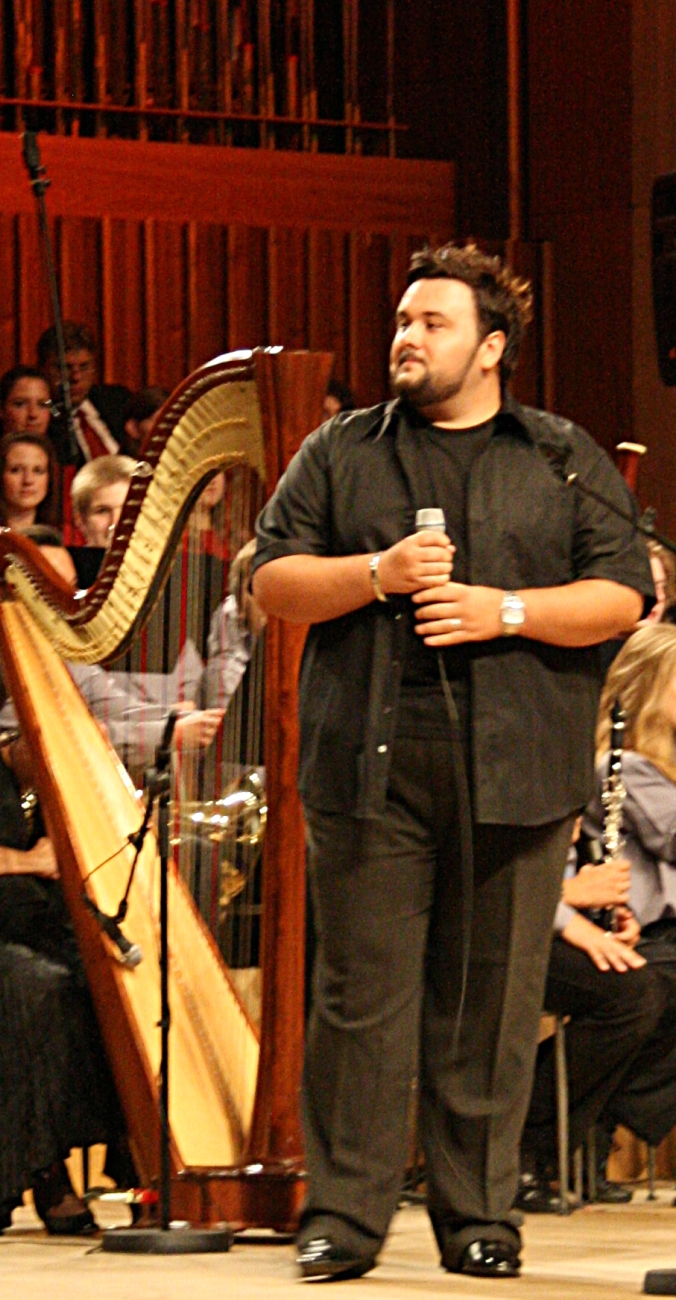

- 2003 – jury member of the musical reality show 'Story Supernova' (Nova TV)
- 2007 – jury member of the musical reality show 'Showtime' (Nova TV)
- 2007 and 2010 – winner of HRT's show 'Zvijezde pjevaju' ['Just the Two of Us'] (Croatian Radiotelevision)
- 2015 – winning mentor in the TV-show 'THE VOICE' (CRT)
- Thousands of concerts and performances across Croatia and the region
- Supported hundreds of charity initiatives and concerts
- 2007-today – sold out the Vatroslav Lisinski Concert Hall 12 times as a solo performer
- 14/05/2006 – Concert album promotion at the Gavella theater in Zagreb
- 14/02/2007 – Valentine's Day at the Komedija
- 19/12/2010 – Lincoln Center, New York, 10th career anniversary concert
- 19/02/2012 – Gala-concert 'Jacques Houdek & divas', Croatian National Theater in Zagreb
- 12/08/2016 – Big Summer Stage in Opatija, gala-concert 'The Greatest Voice Sings for You'
- 20/11/2016 – Croatian National Theater in Split, 'Two Voices – Two Instruments', Jacques Houdek & Nina Kraljić
- 2007-today – regular entry in the TOP 20 most listened performers in Croatia (according to the report of the Croatian Union for the Protection of Performers' Rights)
- 2016 – played the leading role in the children's spectacle 'Kraš's Sweet Fairytale' (sold out 23 times)
- Jacques is a full member of the Croatian Composers' Society (HDS) and the author of many of his hit songs.

== Professional collaborations ==
Musicians

Goran Kovačić, Robert Vrbančić, Alan Dović, Kristijan Zebić, Krunoslav Dražić, Antun Stašić, Ante Gelo, Krunoslav Levačić, Dalibor Marinković, Davor Černigoj, Nebojša Buhin, Zlatan Došlić, Igor Geržina et al.

Producers

Predrag Martinjak, Tihomir Ivanetić, Bojan Šalomon, Nikša Bratoš, David Vurdelja, Tihomir Preradović, Mahir Sarihodžić, Olja Dešić, Boris Đurđević, Dalibor Paurić, Hrvoje Runtić et al.

Composers

Ante Pecotić, Aleksandra Milutinović, Aleksandra Kovač, Andrea Čubrić, Bruno Kovačić, Ivana Plechinger, Ines Prajo, Arijana Kunštek, Zorana Šiljeg, Tonči Huljić, Ivica Krajač, Ivan Škunca et al.

Conductors

Zdravko Šljivac, Alan Bjelinski, Siniša Leopold, Stipica Kalogjera, Nikica Kalogjera, Joško Banov et al.

Ensembles

Girls' Choir 'Zvjezdice', Children's choir 'Klinci s Ribnjaka', Zagreb Soloists, Croatian Radiotelevision Jazz Orchestra, Ante Gelo Big Band, Nikša Bratoš Band, Krunoslav Dražić's Tambura Orchestra, Croatian Radiotelevision's Tambura Orchestra, Antun Stašić's Maestro Orchestra et al.

Singers

Tereza Kesovija, Gabi Novak, Josipa Lisac, Radojka Šverko, Vera Svoboda, Zdenka Kovačiček, Zdenka Vučković, Doris Dragović, Nina Badrić, Vanna, Ivana Kindl, Ivana Husar, Maja Blagdan, Kaliopi, Oliver Dragojević, Krunoslav Slabinac, Tony Cetinski, Massimo, Marko Tolja, Erato group et al.

Awards and achievements
Preceded by Nina Kraljić with "Lighthouse"	Croatia in the Eurovision Song Contest; 2017	Succeeded by Franka Batelić with "Crazy"
