= Davor Gobac =

Croatian singer-songwriter

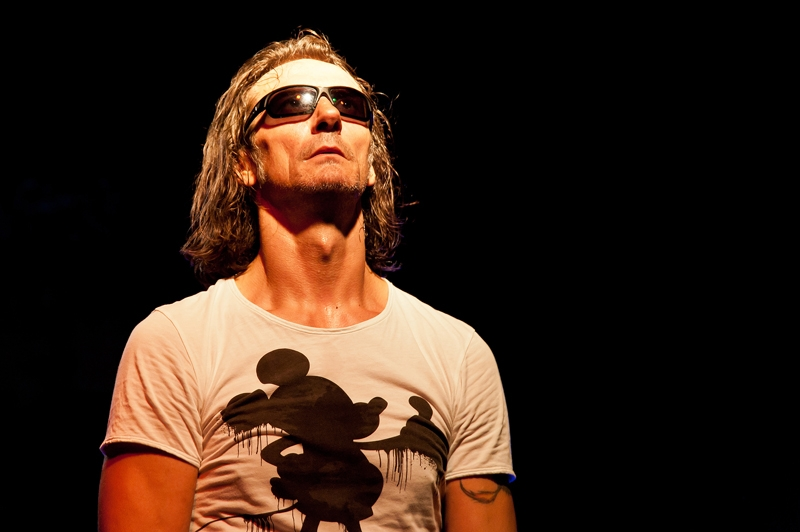
- Gobac in 2013

Background information
- Born: 17 February 1964 (age 62); Karlovac, SR Croatia, SFR Yugoslavia
- Genres: Punk rock; pop punk; garage rock; alternative rock
- Occupations: Singer, songwriter, actor
- Instruments: Vocals, guitar
- Years active: 1981–present
- Labels: Jugoton; Croatia Records

Davor Gobac (born 17 February 1964) is a Croatian musician and actor, best known as the frontman of the popular rock band Psihomodo Pop.

Gobac gained prominence in the mid-1980s as member of Psihomodo audience and media with their Ramones-influenced punk rock sound, energetic live performances, and Gobac's cross-dressing image. The band's debut album Godina zmaja, released in 1988, launched them to nationwide popularity. Psihomodo Pop enjoyed large mainstream popularity in the late 1980s, managing to maintain cult following in former Yugoslav republics after the dissolution of the country. Gobac has been the band's frontman from its formation to present day, recording 12 studio and 4 live albums with the group up to date. In addition to his work with Psihomodo Pop, Gobac has recorded an album with his side project Vili & DeBili and had a number of roles on television and film.

== Career ==
=== Psihomodo Pop ===
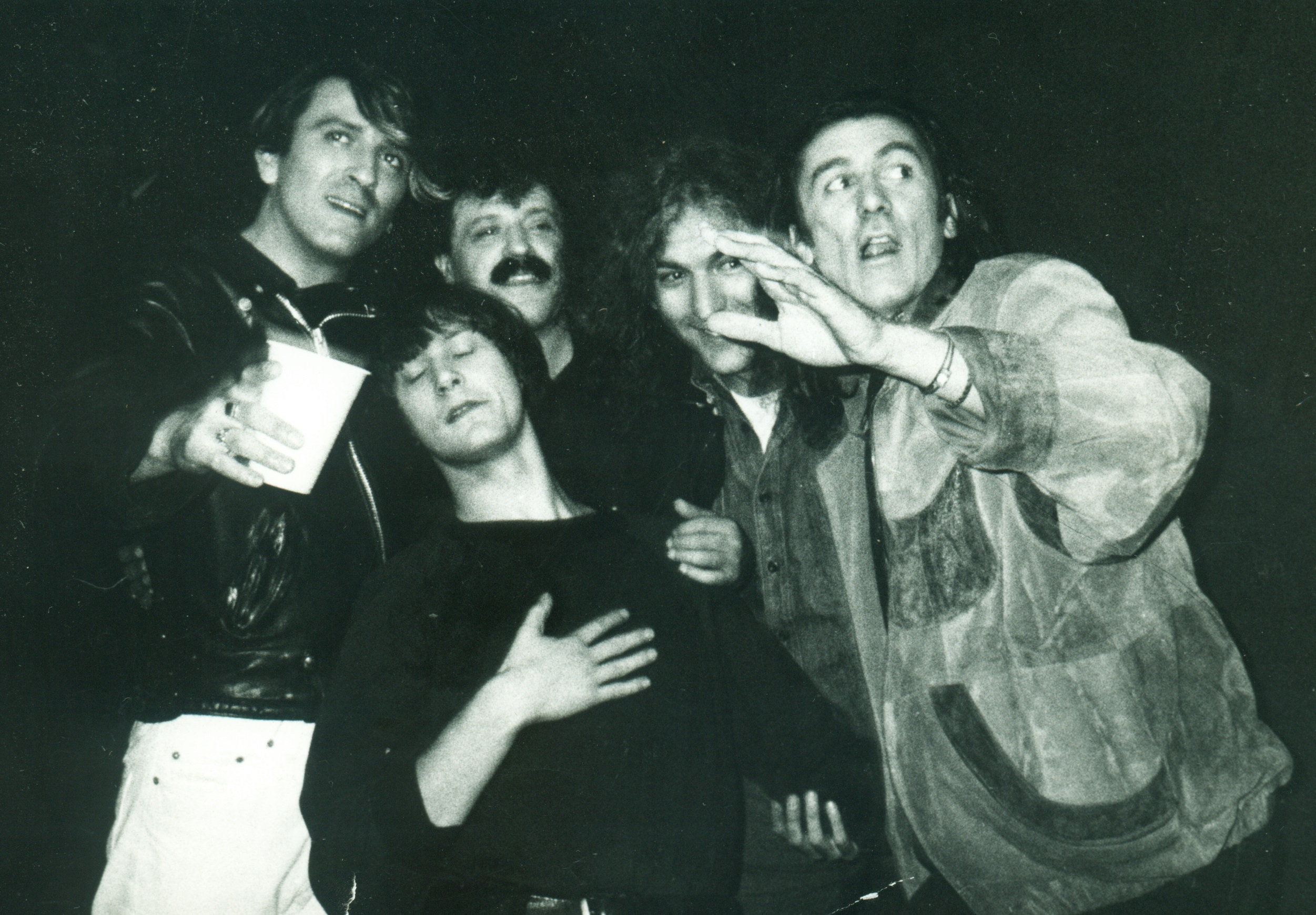
Mladen Vojičić Tifa, Davor Gobac, concert organizer Želimir Altarac "Čičak", Bruno Langer (of Atomsko Sklonište), and Branko Đurić "Đuro" (of Bombaj Štampa) during the 1989 YU Rock Marathon festival held in Sarajevo's Zetra Hall

Gobac performed in a local punk rock band before forming Psihomodo Pop in 1982 with guitarist Neven Kepenski, bass guitarist Smiljan Paradiš "Šparka", drummer Tigran Kalebota and saxophonist Branko Banjeglav, all of them 18 years old at the time. The band attracted the attention of the public with their energetic live performances. After the lineup change in 1985, the band turned towards Ramones-influenced sound, Gobac starting to appear on the group's live performances wearing female clothes. The band's 1988 debut Godina zmaja (Year of the Dragon) launched the band to nationwide fame, and follow-up performances in Netherlands attracted the attention of international media. After the release of the 1989 album Live in Amsterdam, recorded on the band's performances in Dutch clubs, Psihomodo Pop released the successful album Sexy magazin (Sexy Magazine) in 1990, Gobac appearing on the album cover wearing female lingerie. Following the outbreak of Yugoslav Wars, the band continued their career in independent Croatia, releasing several successful albums, returning to the regional scene in the early 2000s.

=== Vili & DeBili ===
Gobac started his side project Vili & DeBili with his son Vili Gobac (drums, vocals) and Srđan Sekulović "Skansi" (bass guitar). Davor Gobac authored most of the songs, played guitar and provided vocals for the band's album No.1, released in 2021.

=== Guest appearances ===
Gobac has made a number of guest appearances. In 1993, he provided lead vocals for the song "Yin & Yang" released on the album Priroda & društvo (Nature & Society) by Croatian singer and songwriter Dino Dvornik. On the 2005 album Prvo pa muško (Off to a Good Start) by Croatian hip hop group Connect he appeared in the song "Vuglji, vuglji". He sang the Croatian language version of "Santa Claus Is Coming To Town" for the 2007 album Božićni blues (Christmas Blues) by children's choir Klinci s Ribnjaka (Kids from Ribnjak). He co-authored and appeared in the song "Sretan Božić, sretna Nova godina" ("Merry Christmas and a Happy New Year") released on Dino Dvornik's 2008 album Pandorina kutija (Pandora's Box). He appeared on the 2009 album Ljubav & moda (Love & Fashion) by the Croatian band Swingers, providing lead vocals for the band's version of the 1960s Yugoslav hit "Devojko mala" ("(Hey) Little Girl"). With Croatian alternative rock band Brujači (Noise Makers) he recorded the single "Ne, ne, ne, ne, ne, ne, ne!" ("No, no, no, no, no, no, no!") in 2011. On the 2014 album Dođe mi da poje(d)(b)em (I Feel Like Eating/Fucking) by Croatian punk rock band Prosti Fucktori (Simple Fucktors) he appeared in the song "Ajde doma" ("Go Home"). During the same year, he appeared as guest in the song "Begdebe Wunderbra" by Serbian female punk band Vibrator u Rikverc (Vibrator in Reverse). For the 2016 compilation Opus by Slovenian singer Anja Rupel he recorded a new version of the song "Kako bih volio da si tu" ("How I Wish You Were Here") by her former band Videosex. In 2017, he made a guest appearance on the album Pogrebi & pomiriši (Scratch & Smell) by Croatian pop rock band Jinx in the song "Maradona". In 2020, he made a guest appearance in the song "Pinokio" ("Pinocchio") on the album Na putu (On the Road) by Croatian band Vinko Čemeraš & Talvi Tuuli. In 2022, he provided vocals for the single "Sve je lako kad si gad" ("Everything Is Easy If You're a Bastard") by Croatian funk band The Bastardz.

=== Acting career ===
In the mid-1980s, prior to Psihomodo Pop's nationwide success, Gobac gained significant popularity owing to his role of Milan Blenton in the musical TV show Stereovizija (Stereovision), for which he recorded the song "Grički izotop" ("Grič Isotope"). He has had a number of roles on film and in television series. He acted in TV series Zlatni vrč (Golden Jug), Naša mala klinika (Our Little Clinic), Bitange i princeze (Brutes and Princesses), Zakon! (Law!), Stipe u gostima (Stipe Visiting), Najbolje godine (Best Years), Crno-bijeli svijet (Black and White World) and Dnevnik velikog Perice (Diary of Grown-Up Perica). He appeared in Igor Filipović's film Nit života (The Thread of Life, 2000) and in Vinko Brešan's film Will Not End Here (2008). He acted in the children's show Poštanski sandučić (Post Box). He appeared as a voice actor in Croatian releases of animated feature films Brother Bear and Khumba.

=== Other activities ===
Gobac creates acrylic works on canvas and wood. He described his style as "dadoism" and stated that it draws influences from various styles and movements, from pop art to urban naive art.

== Legacy ==
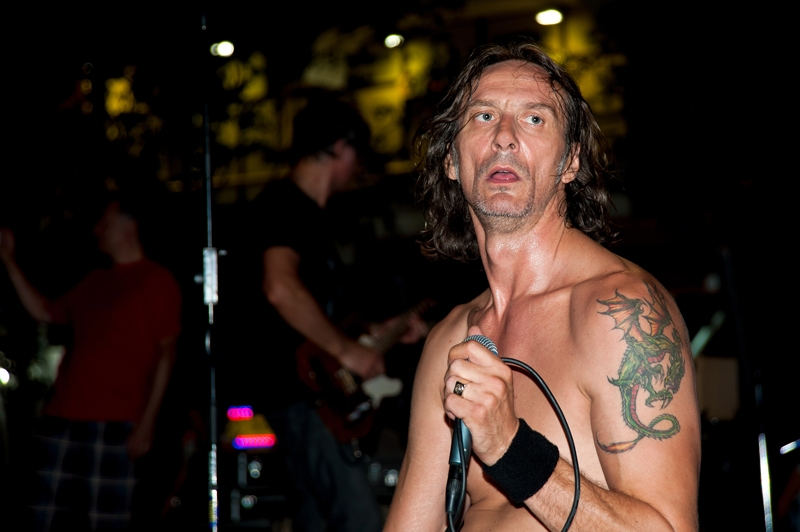
Gobac performing with Psihomodo Pop in 2013

In 2015, Godina zmaja was polled No.69 on the list of 100 Greatest Yugoslav Albums published by the Croatian edition of Rolling Stone. In 2000, the band's song "Ramona" was polled No.58 on the Rock Express Top 100 Yugoslav Rock Songs of All Times list. In 2006, the band's song "Nema nje (Zauvijek)" ("She's Gone (Forever)") was polled No.86 on the B92 Top 100 Yugoslav songs list.

== Discography ==
=== With Psihomodo Pop ===
==== Studio albums ====
- Godina zmaja (1988)
- Sexy magazin (1990)
- Tko je ubio Mickey Mousea? (1992)
- Srebrne svinje (1993)
- Unpljugd (1994)
- Sextasy (1997)
- Debakl (2000)
- Plastic Fantastic (2004)
- Jeee! Jeee! Jeee! (2009)
- Ćiribu ćiriba (2014)
- Digitalno nebo (2019)
- Vjerujem u čuda (2024)

==== Live albums ====
- Live in Amsterdam (1989)
- Das Beste Aus Der Grossen Hit Parade (Die Shonen Melodien '98) (1998)
- Ste dobro? (2009)
- Live unpljugd 2 Gavella (2017)

==== Compilations ====
- Tekućih 20 (2003)
- The Ultimate Collection (2007)
- Greatest Hits Collection (2020)

==== Box sets ====
- Original Album Collection (2015)

==== Singles ====
- "Hrvatska mora pobjediti" (maxi single, 1991)

==== Video albums ====
- Briljant video-pop (1990)
- Tekućih 20 (2003)
- Ste dobro? (2009)
- Live unpljugd 2 Gavella (2017)

=== With Vili & DeBili ===
==== Studio albums ====
- No.1 (2021)
