= Ivan Dečak =

- Born: 20 October 1979 (age 46); Virovitica, SR Croatia, SFR Yugoslavia
- Years active: 1999–present
- Member of: Vatra

Ivan Dečak (born 20 October 1979) is a Croatian singer and one of the founders and lead vocalist of Croatian band Vatra.

== Biography ==
He was born in Virovitica in 1979, where he attended music school and high school.

Together with friends in 1999, he founded the band Vatra. In late 1999 he moved to Zagreb, where he lives today. He has a daughter by his girlfriend Nina.

To date, Vatra released six studio albums and over 30 singles, made a number of video clips, as well as in Croatia and the region had over 500 live appearances. In 2015, he became a coach in the reality show of HRT, The Voice – Najljepši glas Hrvatske.
