= United Kingdom in the Eurovision Song Contest 2013 =

- Eurovision Song Contest 2013
- Participating broadcaster: British Broadcasting Corporation (BBC)
- Country: United Kingdom
- Selection process: Internal selection
- Announcement date: 7 March 2013

Competing entry
- Song: "Believe in Me"
- Artist: Bonnie Tyler
- Songwriters: Desmond Child; Lauren Christy; Christopher Braide

Placement
- Final result: 19th, 23 points

Participation chronology

The United Kingdom was represented at the Eurovision Song Contest 2013 with the song "Believe in Me" written by Desmond Child, Lauren Christy and Christopher Braide, and performed by Bonnie Tyler. The British participating broadcaster, the British Broadcasting Corporation (BBC), internally selected both the song and the performer. Tyler and the song "Believe in Me" were announced as the British entry on 7 March 2013.

As a member of the "Big Five", the United Kingdom automatically qualified to compete in the final of the Eurovision Song Contest. Performing in position 15, the United Kingdom placed 19th out of the 26 participating countries with 23 points.

== Background ==
Prior to the 2013 contest, the British Broadcasting Corporation (BBC) had participated in the Eurovision Song Contest representing the United Kingdom fifty-five times. Thus far, it has won the contest five times: in 1967 with the song "Puppet on a String" performed by Sandie Shaw, in 1969 with the song "Boom Bang-a-Bang" performed by Lulu, in 1976 with the song "Save Your Kisses for Me" performed by Brotherhood of Man, in 1981 with the song "Making Your Mind Up" performed by Bucks Fizz, and in 1997 with the song "Love Shine a Light" performed by Katrina and the Waves. To this point, the nation is noted for having finished as the runner-up in a record fifteen contests. Up to and including 1998, the UK had only twice finished outside the top 10, in 1978 and 1987. Since 1999, the year in which the rule was abandoned that songs must be performed in one of the official languages of the country participating, the UK has had less success, thus far only finishing within the top ten twice: in 2002 with the song "Come Back" performed by Jessica Garlick and in 2009 with the song "It's My Time" performed by Jade Ewen. For the 2012 contest, the United Kingdom finished in nineteenth place out of twenty-six competing entries with the song "Love Will Set You Free" performed by Engelbert Humperdinck.

As part of its duties as participating broadcaster, the BBC organises the selection of its entry in the Eurovision Song Contest and broadcasts the event in the country. The broadcaster announced that it would participate in the 2013 contest on 14 September 2012. In 2011 and 2012, BBC opted to internally select the British entry, a selection procedure that continued for their 2013 entry despite demands subsequent to the 2012 contest for the return of a national final to choose the British entry for Eurovision.

== Before Eurovision ==
=== Internal selection ===
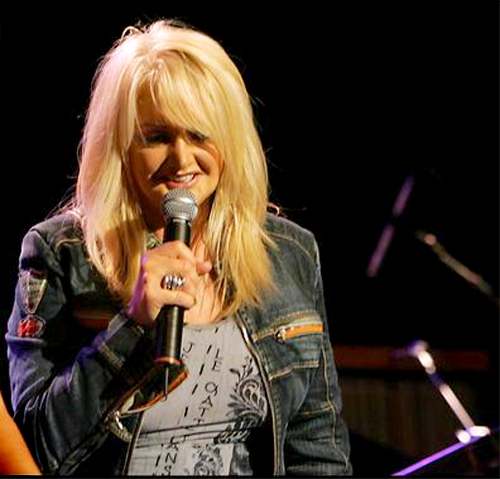
Bonnie Tyler was internally selected to represent the United Kingdom in the Eurovision Song Contest 2013

On 17 January 2013, BBC announced that the British entry for the Eurovision Song Contest 2013 would be selected internally. Artists that were rumoured in the media included singers Alesha Dixon, Kim Wilde and Shirley Bassey, musical stage actress Bonnie Langford, the group Girls Aloud and group member Kimberly Walsh who had been recording songs in Sweden with composer Fredrik Kempe for her solo debut album.

On 7 March 2013, the song "Believe in Me" written by Desmond Child, Lauren Christy and Christopher Braide and performed by Bonnie Tyler was revealed as the British entry for the Eurovision Song Contest 2013. The selection of Bonnie Tyler as the British representative was reported in February 2013 by blogger The Kickdrum who stated that the BBC had selected a well-known female solo artist, with Tyler set to release a new album and having created new social media accounts as well as a website. Bonnie Tyler became the fifth Welsh-born solo act to represent the United Kingdom at Eurovision, following Mary Hopkin (1970), Emma (1990), Jessica Garlick (2002) and James Fox (2004). "Believe in Me" was selected by a professional panel consisting of BBC Eurovision producers in late December 2012 through an advance copy of Tyler's new album Rocks and Honey. The song was presented to the public on the same day of the entry announcement through the release of the official music video via BBC's official YouTube channel.

=== Preparation ===
On 11 May, BBC Three aired a two-hour show entitled How to Win Eurovision, hosted by Greg James and Russell Kane. Former British Eurovision representatives Bucks Fizz, Sonia, Jemini, Javine, Daz Sampson, Scooch and Josh Dubovie was featured as guests during the show.

== At Eurovision ==
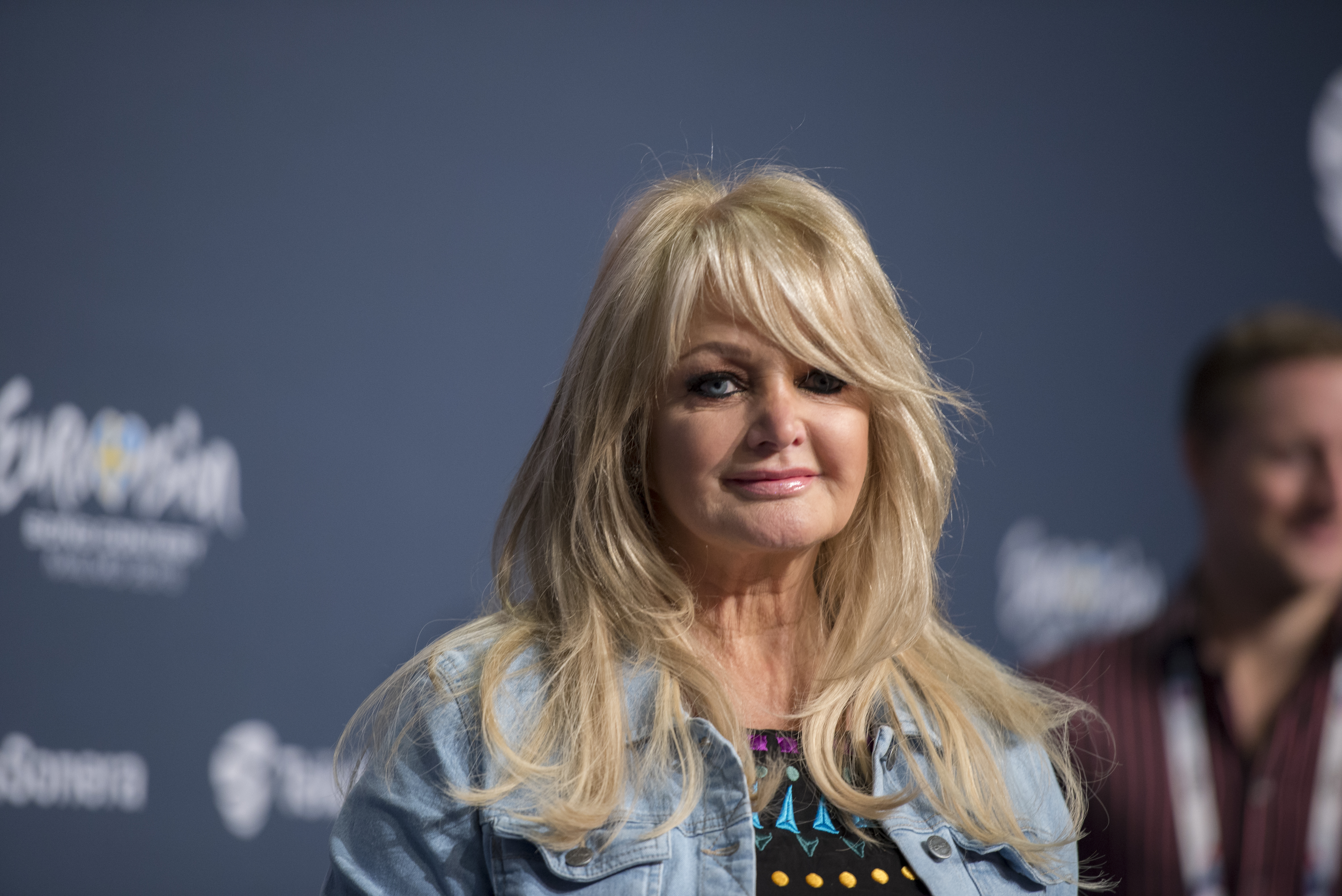
Bonnie Tyler during a press meet and greet

According to Eurovision rules, all nations with the exceptions of the host country and the "Big Five" (France, Germany, Italy, Spain and the United Kingdom) are required to compete in one of two semi-finals, and qualify in order to participate in the final; the top ten countries from each semi-final progress to the final. As a member of the "Big 5", the United Kingdom automatically qualified to compete in the final on 18 May 2013. In addition to their participation in the final, the United Kingdom is also required to broadcast and vote in one of the two semi-finals. During the semi-final allocation draw on 17 January 2013, the United Kingdom was assigned to broadcast and vote in the first semi-final on 14 May 2013.

In the United Kingdom, the semi-finals were broadcast on BBC Three with commentary by Scott Mills and Ana Matronic. The final was televised on BBC One with commentary by Graham Norton and broadcast on BBC Radio 2 with commentary by Ken Bruce. The British spokesperson, who announced the British votes during the final, was Scott Mills.

=== Final ===
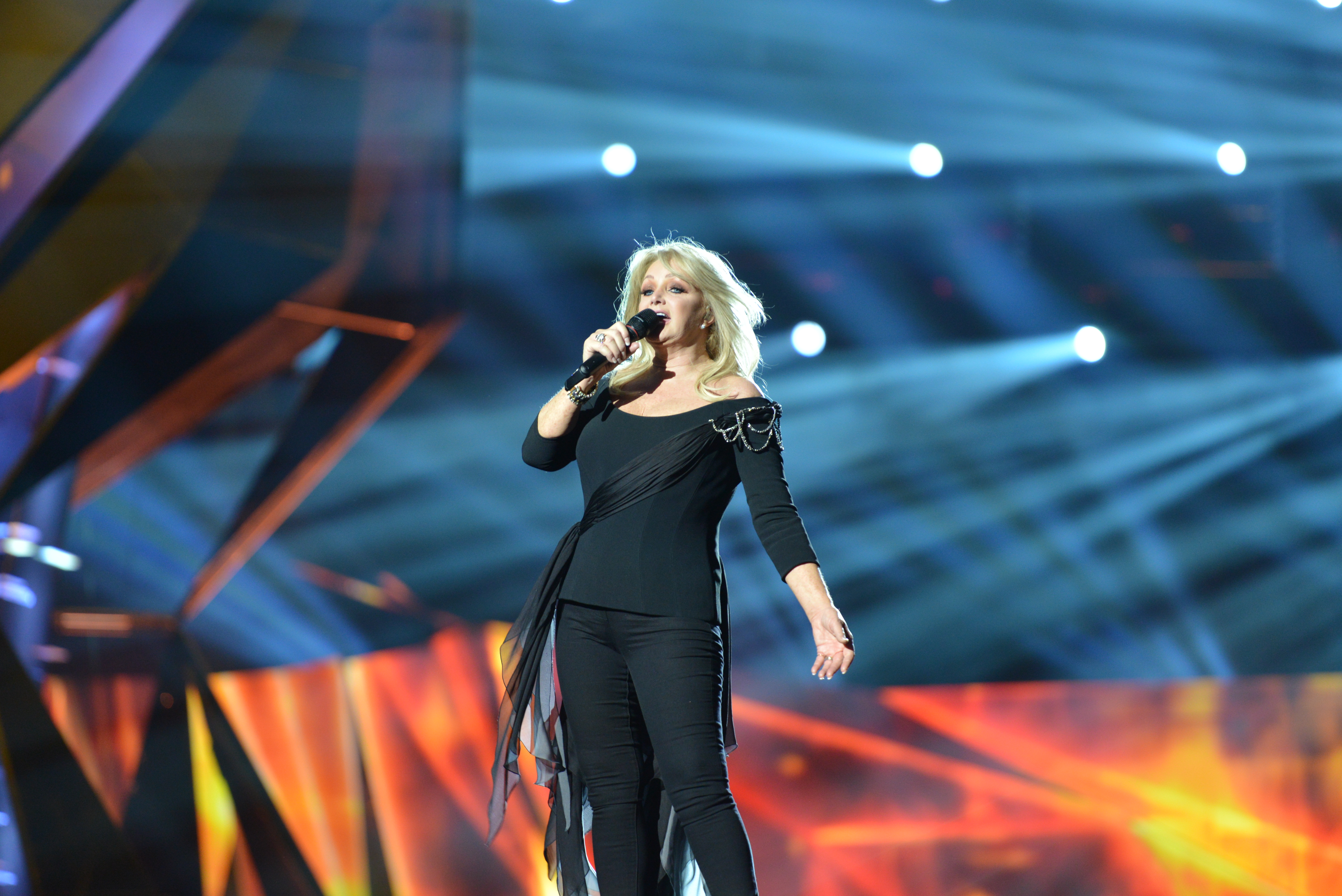
Bonnie Tyler during a rehearsal before the final

Bonnie Tyler took part in technical rehearsals on 12 and 15 May, followed by dress rehearsals on 17 and 18 May. This included the jury final on 17 May where the professional juries of each country watched and voted on the competing entries. During the British delegation's press conference on 15 May, Tyler took part in a draw to determine in which half of the final the British entry would be performed. United Kingdom was drawn to compete in the second half. Following the conclusion of the second semi-final, the shows' producers decided upon the running order of the final. The running order for the semi-finals and final was decided by the shows' producers rather than through another draw, so that similar songs were not placed next to each other. United Kingdom was subsequently placed to perform in position 15, following the entry from Romania and before the entry from Sweden.

The British performance featured Bonnie Tyler performing on a predominately orange and yellow coloured stage in front of a stage set-up which included a drummer and four backing vocalists/instrumentalists. Tyler concluded the performance by walking down the catwalk stage before being raised high on the platform on the catwalk, with the overhead lighting effects lowering down from the ceiling at the same time. The supporting performers that joined Tyler for the performance were Grant Mugent-Kershaw, Anthony Goldsbrough, Michael Gazzard, Hayley Sanderson and Kristen Cummings. The United Kingdom placed nineteenth in the final, scoring 23 points.

=== Voting ===
Voting during the three shows involved each country awarding points from 1–8, 10 and 12 as determined by a combination of 50% national jury and 50% televoting. Each nation's jury consisted of five music industry professionals who are citizens of the country they represent, with their names published before the contest to ensure transparency. This jury judged each entry based on: vocal capacity; the stage performance; the song's composition and originality; and the overall impression by the act. In addition, no member of a national jury was permitted to be related in any way to any of the competing acts in such a way that they cannot vote impartially and independently.

Following the release of the full split voting by the EBU after the conclusion of the competition, it was revealed that the United Kingdom had placed twenty-second with the public televote and fifteenth with the jury vote. In the public vote, the United Kingdom received an average rank of 17.03, while with the jury vote, the United Kingdom received an average rank of 12.46.

Below is a breakdown of points awarded to the United Kingdom and awarded by United Kingdom in the first semi-final and grand final of the contest. The nation awarded its 12 points to Denmark in the semi-final and final of the contest.

==== Points awarded to the United Kingdom ====
Points awarded to the United Kingdom (Final)
Score	Country
12 points	
10 points	
8 points	
7 points	Ireland
6 points	
5 points	Malta
4 points	Spain
3 points	Romania
2 points	Switzerland
1 point	Slovenia; Sweden

==== Points awarded by the United Kingdom ====
Points awarded by the United Kingdom (Semi-final 1)
Score	Country
12 points	Denmark
10 points	Russia
8 points	Netherlands
7 points	Lithuania
6 points	Ireland
5 points	Belgium
4 points	Estonia
3 points	Cyprus
2 points	Ukraine
1 point	Austria

Points awarded by the United Kingdom (Final)
Score	Country
12 points	Denmark
10 points	Russia
8 points	Greece
7 points	Malta
6 points	Netherlands
5 points	Ukraine
4 points	Romania
3 points	Belgium
2 points	Iceland
1 point	Ireland

===== Jury rankings by the United Kingdom =====
Jury ranking by the United Kingdom (Semi-final 1)
Rank	Country
1	Russia
2	Austria
3	Denmark
4	Estonia
5	Belgium
6	Netherlands
7	Moldova
8	Belarus
9	Ukraine
10	Ireland
11	Lithuania
12	Slovenia
13	Cyprus
14	Serbia
15	Croatia
16	Montenegro

Jury ranking by the United Kingdom (Final)
Rank	Country
1	Russia
2	Belgium
3	Denmark
4	Estonia
5	Ukraine
6	Netherlands
7	Georgia
8	Belarus
9	Azerbaijan
10	Iceland
11	Moldova
12	Malta
13	Greece
14	France
15	Armenia
16	Romania
17	Italy
18	Germany
19	Sweden
20	Hungary
21	Norway
22	Ireland
23	Finland
24	Lithuania
25	Spain
