= Belarus in the Eurovision Song Contest 2014 =

- Eurovision Song Contest 2014
- Participating broadcaster: Belarusian Television and Radio Company (BTRC)
- Country: Belarus
- Selection process: National final
- Selection date: 10 January 2014

Competing entry
- Song: "Cheesecake"
- Artist: Teo
- Songwriters: Yuriy Vashchuk; Dmitry Novik

Placement
- Semi-final result: Qualified (5th, 87 points)
- Final result: 16th, 43 points

Participation chronology

Belarus was represented at the Eurovision Song Contest 2014 with the song "Cheesecake", written by Yuriy Vashchuk and Dmitry Novik, and performed by Vashchuk himself under his stage name Teo. The Belarusian participating broadcaster, Belarusian Television and Radio Company (BTRC), selected its entry for the contest through a national final. The national final consisted of fourteen competing acts participating in a televised production where "Cheesecake" performed by Teo was selected as the winner following the combination of votes from a jury panel and public televoting.

Belarus was drawn to compete in the second semi-final of the Eurovision Song Contest which took place on 8 May 2014. Performing during the show in position 10, "Cheesecake" was announced among the top 10 entries of the second semi-final and therefore qualified to compete in the final on 10 May. It was later revealed that Belarus placed fifth out of the 15 participating countries in the semi-final with 87 points. In the final, Belarus performed in position 2 and placed sixteenth out of the 26 participating countries, scoring 43 points.

== Background ==
Prior to the 2014 contest, Belarusian Television and Radio Company (BTRC) had participated in the Eurovision Song Contest representing Belarus ten times since its first entry in 2004. Its best placing in the contest was sixth, achieved in 2007 with the song "Work Your Magic" performed by Dmitry Koldun. Following the introduction of semi-finals for the 2004, Belarus had managed to qualify to the final three times. In 2013, Belarus qualified to the final and placed sixteenth with the song "Solayoh" performed by Alyona Lanskaya.

As part of its duties as participating broadcaster, BTRC organises the selection of its entry in the Eurovision Song Contest and broadcasts the event in the country. The broadcaster has used both internal selections and national finals to select its entry for Eurovision in the past. Since 2012, BTRC has organised a national final in order to choose its entry, a selection procedure that continued for 2014.

== Before Eurovision ==
=== National final ===
The Belarusian national final took place on 10 January 2014. Fourteen songs participated in the competition and the winner was selected through a jury and a public televote. The show was broadcast on Belarus 1 and Belarus 24 as well as online via the Eurovision Song Contest's official website eurovision.tv.

==== Competing entries ====
Artists and composers were able to submit their applications and entries to the broadcaster between 15 October 2013 and 24 November 2013. At the closing of the deadline, over 70 entries were received by the broadcaster. Auditions were held on 28 and 29 November 2013 at the BTRC studios where a jury panel was tasked with selecting up to fifteen entries to proceed to the televised national final. The jury consisted of Gennady Davydko (chairman of BTRC), Vasily Rainchik (musician/composer), Alexander Tikhanovich (singer), Elena Treshchinskaya (head of the radio station "Radius FM"), Alexander Mezhenny (director of the Shtam dance school), Alyona Lanskaya (singer, represented Belarus at Eurovision in 2013), Marianna Malchik (head of the department of arts at the Belarusian Ministry of Culture), Eduard Martynyuk (soloist of the National Academic Opera and Ballet Theater) and Mikhail Revutsky (head of the section of culture at TV Infoservice). Fifteen finalists were selected and announced on 29 November 2013. On 5 December 2013, Alexey Gross withdrew from the national final at the request of his record label, Spamash, after it was revealed that his song "If I Could Do It All Again", composed by Marc Paelinck and Mathias Strasser, had previously competed in the 2011 Maltese national final.

Artist	Song	Songwriter(s)
Alina Moshchenko	"Angel Crying"	Alina Moshchenko
Anastasia Malashkevich	"Runaway"	Pavel Klyshevsky, M. Goldenkov, Anastasia Vakhomchik
Artem Mikhalenko	"Rapsodiya #1" (Рапсодия #1)	Artem Mikhalenko
Daria	"Starlight"	James Earp
Elena Siniavskaya	"Via Lattea"	Evgeni Oleinik, Yulia Bykova
Janet	"You Will Be Here"	Ylva Persson, Linda Persson, Niclas Haglund
Matvei Cooper and "DUX" Band	"Strippers"	Matvei Bondarenko
Max Lorens and DiDyuLya	"Now You're Gone"	Valery Didyulya, Joe Lynn Turner
Napoli	"Stay With Me"	Pavel Yushin, Aleksey Zubarevich, Olga Shimanskaya
Natalia Tamelo	"Not What I've Been Looking For"	Leonid Shirin, Jana Startseva
Nuteki	"Fly Away"	Mikhail Nokarashvili
Switter Boys feat. Kate&Volga Karol	"Vechnaya lyubov" (Вечная любовь)	Ruslan Gayday, Vladimir Gramma
Tasha Odi	"Empty Universe"	Alexei Shirin
Teo	"Cheesecake"	Yuriy Vashchuk, Dmitry Novik

==== Final ====
The televised final took place on 10 January 2014 at the "600 Metrov" studio in Minsk, hosted by Olga Ryzhikova and Denis Dudinskiy. A 50/50 combination of votes from eight jury members made up of music professionals and public televoting resulted in a tie between "Now You're Gone" performed by Max Lorens and DiDyuLya and "Cheesecake" performed by Teo. The tie was resolved after each member of the jury cast one vote for one of the two songs, with Teo being declared the winner after scoring all eight votes. The jury consisted of Mikhail Revutsky, Alexander Mezhenny, Eduard Martynyuk, Elena Treshchinskaya, Marianna Malchik, Alexander Tikhanovich, Alyona Lanskaya and Vasily Rainchik.

In addition to the performances from the competitors, the show featured guest performances by 2013 Belarusian Eurovision contestant Alyona Lanskaya, Alexander Solodukha, Alexey Gross, Joanna, Eliz, Beatris, Lena Voloshina, SGBAND, Aura, Vitaliy Voronko, 2006 Belarusian Eurovision contestant Polina Smolova, 2008 Belarusian Eurovision contestant Ruslan Alekhno and Gunesh.

Final – 10 January 2014
R/O	Artist	Song	Jury		Televote		Total	Place
R/O	Artist	Song	Votes	Points	Votes	Points	Total	Place
1	Natalia Tamelo	"Not What I've Been Looking For"	29	3	668	0	3	10
2	Nuteki	"Fly Away"	5	0	5,651	10	10	5
3	Artem Mikhalenko	"Rapsodiya #1"	0	0	1,844	0	0	13
4	Matvei Cooper and "DUX" Band	"Strippers"	7	0	2,120	1	1	12
5	Teo	"Cheesecake"	90	12	5,088	8	20	1
6	Daria	"Starlight"	45	6	2,421	2	8	8
7	Elena Siniavskaya	"Via Lattea"	15	2	1,122	0	2	11
8	Alina Moshchenko	"Angel Crying"	13	0	1,841	0	0	13
9	Janet	"You Will Be Here"	80	10	2,655	3	13	3
10	Anastasia Malashkevich	"Runaway"	30	4	3,370	5	9	6
11	Switter Boys feat. Kate&Volga Karol	"Vechnaya lyubov"	52	7	4,384	6	13	3
12	Napoli	"Stay With Me"	14	1	4,847	7	8	8
13	Max Lorens and DiDyuLya	"Now You're Gone"	52	8	8,746	12	20	2
14	Tasha Odi	"Empty Universe"	32	5	2,930	4	9	6

Detailed Jury Votes
R/O	Song	M. Revutsky	A. Mezhenny	E. Martynyuk	E. Treshchinskaya	M. Malchik	A. Tikhanovich	A. Lanskaya	V. Rainchik	Total
1	"Not What I've Been Looking For"	2	5			5	6	5	6	29
2	"Fly Away"	4						1		5
3	"Rapsodiya #1"									0
4	"Strippers"			3	1	2			1	7
5	"Cheesecake"	12	12	12	12	12	12	8	10	90
6	"Starlight"	6	1	4	6	6	5	10	7	45
7	"Via Lattea"	3		7	4	1				15
8	"Angel Crying"		2	1	2		2	4	2	13
9	"You Will Be Here"	8	8	10	10	10	10	12	12	80
10	"Runaway"	1	4	8	7	4	1		5	30
11	"Vechnaya lyubov"	10	10	6	8	3	4	7	4	52
12	"Stay With Me"	5	3				3	3		14
13	"Now You're Gone"	7	7	5	5	7	7	6	8	52
14	"Empty Universe"		6	2	3	8	8	2	3	32

=== Promotion ===
Teo made several appearances across Europe to specifically promote "Cheesecake" as the Belarusian Eurovision entry. On 5 April, Teo performed during the Eurovision in Concert event which was held at the Melkweg venue in Amsterdam, Netherlands and hosted by Cornald Maas and Sandra Reemer. On 20 April, Teo performed during the Russian Pre-Party event, which was organised by ESCKAZ and held at the Karlson restaurant in Moscow, Russia.

== At Eurovision ==
Teo presenting himself and "Cheesecake" at the Eurovision Song Contest 2014

According to Eurovision rules, all nations with the exceptions of the host country and the "Big Five" (France, Germany, Italy, Spain and the United Kingdom) are required to qualify from one of two semi-finals in order to compete for the final; the top ten countries from each semi-final progress to the final. The European Broadcasting Union (EBU) split up the competing countries into six different pots based on voting patterns from previous contests, with countries with favourable voting histories put into the same pot. On 20 January 2014, a special allocation draw was held which placed each country into one of the two semi-finals, as well as which half of the show they would perform in. Belarus was placed into the second semi-final, to be held on 8 May 2014, and was scheduled to perform in the second half of the show.

Once all the competing songs for the 2014 contest had been released, the running order for the semi-finals was decided by the shows' producers rather than through another draw, so that similar songs were not placed next to each other. Belarus was set to perform in position 10, following the entry from Ireland and before the entry from Macedonia.

The two semi-finals and the final were broadcast in Belarus on Belarus 1 and Belarus 24 with commentary by Evgeny Perlin. The Belarusian spokesperson, who announced the Belarusian votes during the final, was 2013 Belarusian contest entrant Alyona Lanskaya.

=== Semi-final ===
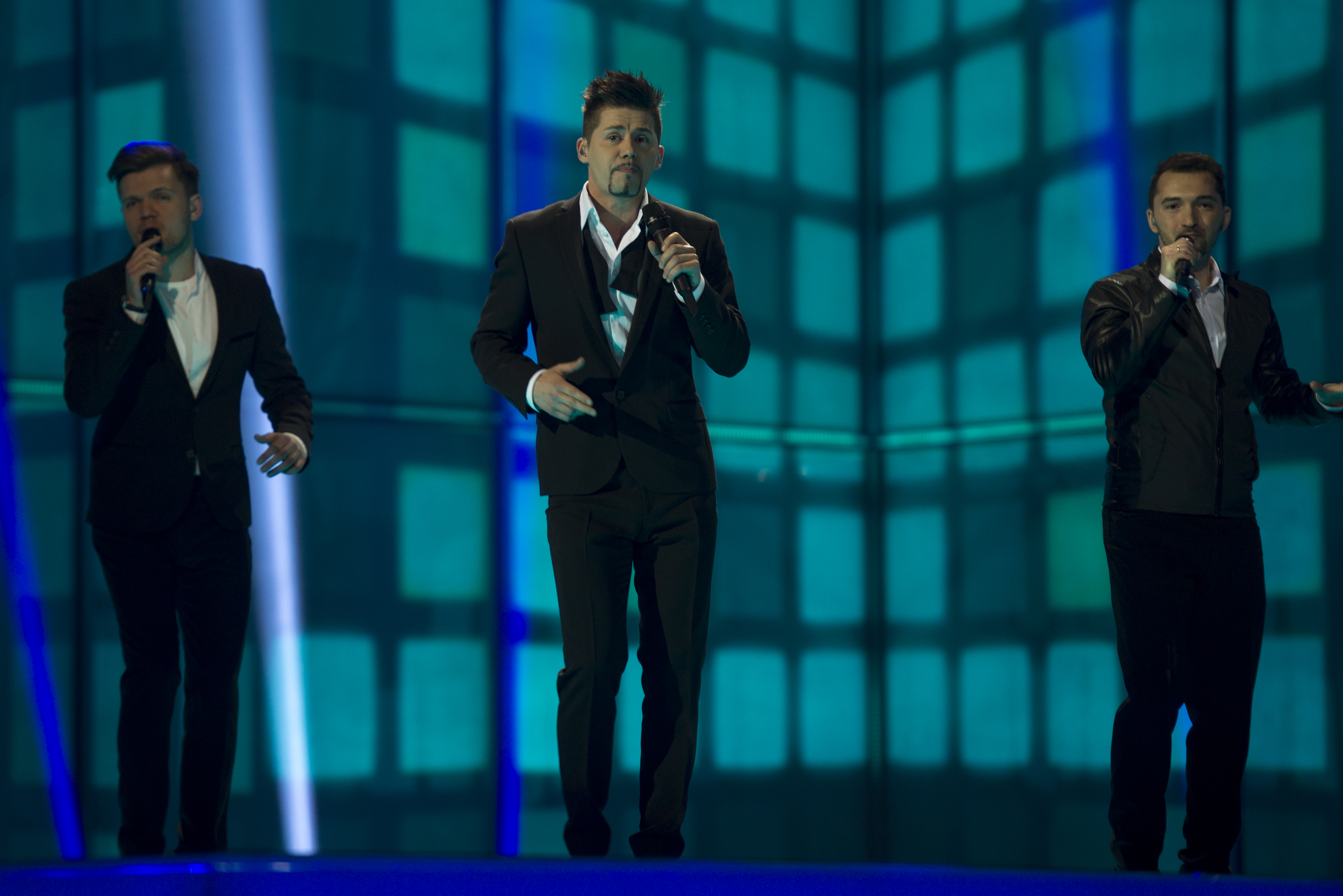
Teo during a rehearsal before the second semi-final

Teo took part in technical rehearsals on 30 April and 3 May, followed by dress rehearsals on 7 and 8 May. This included the jury show on 7 May where the professional juries of each country watched and voted on the competing entries.

The Belarusian performance featured Teo performing on stage together with three backing vocalists and two dancers, all of them wearing black suits and white shirts against a background that transitioned from red and yellow colours to blue. The performance began with the performers in a V-shaped formation with Teo walking on stage from the back and performing a choreographed routine. The director for the Belarusian performance was Tine Matulessy. At the Eurovision Song Contest, Teo performed "Cheesecake" under alternate lyrics ("all the maps"), which replaced the original version that contained a reference to Google Maps as references to companies and brands violate the rules of the contest. The three backing vocalists that joined Teo were: Denis Lis, Artyom Akhmash and Yuriy Seleznyov, while the two dancers were: Alexander Zalesskiy and Andrey Martynov.

At the end of the show, Belarus was announced as having finished in the top 10 and subsequently qualifying for the grand final. It was later revealed that Belarus placed fifth in the semi-final, receiving a total of 87 points.

=== Final ===
Shortly after the second semi-final, a winners' press conference was held for the ten qualifying countries. As part of this press conference, the qualifying artists took part in a draw to determine which half of the grand final they would subsequently participate in. This draw was done in the order the countries were announced during the semi-final. Belarus was drawn to compete in the first half. Following this draw, the shows' producers decided upon the running order of the final, as they had done for the semi-finals. Belarus was subsequently placed to perform in position 2, following the entry from Ukraine and before the entry from Azerbaijan.

Teo once again took part in dress rehearsals on 9 and 10 May before the final, including the jury final where the professional juries cast their final votes before the live show. Teo performed a repeat of his semi-final performance during the final on 10 May. At the conclusion of the voting, Belarus finished in sixteenth place with 43 points.

=== Voting ===
Voting during the three shows consisted of 50 percent public televoting and 50 percent from a jury deliberation. The jury consisted of five music industry professionals who were citizens of the country they represent, with their names published before the contest to ensure transparency. This jury was asked to judge each contestant based on: vocal capacity; the stage performance; the song's composition and originality; and the overall impression by the act. In addition, no member of a national jury could be related in any way to any of the competing acts in such a way that they cannot vote impartially and independently. The individual rankings of each jury member were released shortly after the grand final.

Following the release of the full split voting by the EBU after the conclusion of the competition, it was revealed that Belarus had placed eleventh with the public televote and eighteenth with the jury vote in the final. In the public vote, Belarus scored 56 points, while with the jury vote, Belarus scored 50 points. In the second semi-final, Belarus placed sixth with the public televote with 86 points and sixth with the jury vote, scoring 71 points.

Below is a breakdown of points awarded to Belarus and awarded by Belarus in the second semi-final and grand final of the contest, and the breakdown of the jury voting and televoting conducted during the two shows:

==== Points awarded to Belarus ====
Points awarded to Belarus (Semi-final 2)
Score	Country
12 points	Georgia; Lithuania
10 points	Austria
8 points	Greece; Romania
7 points	Finland; Israel; Poland
6 points	Malta; Slovenia
5 points	
4 points	
3 points	
2 points	Macedonia
1 point	Ireland; Norway

Points awarded to Belarus (Final)
Score	Country
12 points	Russia
10 points	
8 points	Armenia
7 points	Azerbaijan
6 points	Ukraine
5 points	Moldova
4 points	
3 points	Lithuania
2 points	
1 point	Israel; Montenegro

==== Points awarded by Belarus ====
Points awarded by Belarus (Semi-final 2)
Score	Country
12 points	Greece
10 points	Poland
8 points	Romania
7 points	Austria
6 points	Lithuania
5 points	Georgia
4 points	Malta
3 points	Switzerland
2 points	Israel
1 point	Macedonia

Points awarded by Belarus (Final)
Score	Country
12 points	Russia
10 points	Armenia
8 points	Ukraine
7 points	Poland
6 points	Greece
5 points	Hungary
4 points	Norway
3 points	Azerbaijan
2 points	Netherlands
1 point	Romania

==== Detailed voting results ====
The following members comprised the Belarusian jury:

- Vasily Rainchik (jury chairperson) – musician
- Eugene Oleinik – composer, producer
- Olga Ryzhikova – television host, singer
- Alexander Mezhenny – television host, choreographer
- Inna Adamovich – specialist in organisation of festivals and contests

Detailed voting results from Belarus (Semi-final 2)
R/O	Country	V. Rainchik	E. Oleinik	O. Ryzhikova	A. Mezhenny	I. Adamovich	Jury Rank	Televote Rank	Combined Rank	Points
01	Malta	1	2	2	1	1	1	13	7	4
02	Israel	9	6	8	8	6	7	10	9	2
03	Norway	14	11	11	13	8	12	7	11	
04	Georgia	3	4	1	3	2	2	12	6	5
05	Poland	7	9	7	9	11	8	1	2	10
06	Austria	8	8	10	7	10	9	3	4	7
07	Lithuania	6	1	5	2	4	4	8	5	6
08	Finland	11	13	9	12	12	11	9	13	
09	Ireland	10	12	14	14	13	13	11	14	
10	Belarus									
11	Macedonia	2	3	3	4	3	3	14	10	1
12	Switzerland	12	10	12	10	9	10	5	8	3
13	Greece	5	7	4	6	5	6	2	1	12
14	Slovenia	13	14	13	11	14	14	6	12	
15	Romania	4	5	6	5	7	5	4	3	8

Detailed voting results from Belarus (Final)
R/O	Country	V. Rainchik	E. Oleinik	O. Ryzhikova	A. Mezhenny	I. Adamovich	Jury Rank	Televote Rank	Combined Rank	Points
01	Ukraine	4	1	5	4	5	4	3	3	8
02	Belarus									
03	Azerbaijan	3	4	4	3	2	3	19	8	3
04	Iceland	20	14	16	18	17	17	17	17	
05	Norway	7	12	12	13	9	11	9	7	4
06	Romania	11	10	8	9	12	10	14	10	1
07	Armenia	6	5	6	5	4	5	2	2	10
08	Montenegro	18	23	21	19	23	21	23	25	
09	Poland	5	9	2	10	13	8	5	4	7
10	Greece	8	6	7	8	6	6	8	5	6
11	Austria	24	25	20	23	22	23	4	14	
12	Germany	14	13	10	12	8	12	15	15	
13	Sweden	23	20	18	22	20	20	6	12	
14	France	16	19	17	17	18	18	22	24	
15	Russia	1	2	3	1	1	1	1	1	12
16	Italy	13	16	15	14	11	14	25	22	
17	Slovenia	22	24	23	25	24	25	12	21	
18	Finland	17	17	22	21	19	19	13	16	
19	Spain	15	18	19	15	16	16	20	20	
20	Switzerland	19	15	14	16	14	15	10	11	
21	Hungary	10	8	11	7	10	9	7	6	5
22	Malta	2	3	1	2	3	2	24	13	
23	Denmark	12	11	13	11	15	13	21	18	
24	Netherlands	9	7	9	6	7	7	16	9	2
25	San Marino	25	21	24	20	25	24	11	19	
26	United Kingdom	21	22	25	24	21	22	18	23	
