= Denmark in the Eurovision Song Contest 2013 =

- Eurovision Song Contest 2013
- Participating broadcaster: Danmarks Radio (DR)
- Country: Denmark
- Selection process: Dansk Melodi Grand Prix 2013
- Selection date: 26 January 2013

Competing entry
- Song: "Only Teardrops"
- Artist: Emmelie de Forest
- Songwriters: Lise Cabble; Julia Fabrin Jakobsen; Thomas Stengaard

Placement
- Semi-final result: Qualified (1st, 167 points)
- Final result: 1st, 281 points

Participation chronology

Denmark was represented at the Eurovision Song Contest 2013 with the song "Only Teardrops", written by Lise Cabble, Julia Fabrin Jakobsen, and Thomas Stengaard, and performed by Emmelie de Forest. The Danish participating broadcaster, Danmarks Radio (DR), organised the national final Dansk Melodi Grand Prix 2013 in order to select its entry for the contest. Ten songs competed in a televised show where "Only Teardrops" performed by Emmelie de Forest was the winner as decided upon through the combination of jury voting and public voting over two rounds.

Denmark was drawn to compete in the first semi-final of the Eurovision Song Contest which took place on 14 May 2013. Performing during the show in position 5, "Only Teardrops" was announced among the top 10 entries of the first semi-final and therefore qualified to compete in the final on 18 May. It was later revealed that Denmark placed first out of the 16 participating countries in the semi-final with 167 points. In the final, Denmark performed in position 18 and placed first out of the 26 participating countries, winning the contest with 281 points. This was Denmark's third win in the Eurovision Song Contest; their last victory was in 2000.

== Background ==
Prior to the 2013 contest, Danmarks Radio (DR) had participated in the Eurovision Song Contest representing Denmark forty-one times since its first entry in 1957. It had won the contest, to this point, on two occasions: in 1963 with the song "Dansevise" performed by Grethe and Jørgen Ingmann, and in 2000 with the song "Fly on the Wings of Love" performed by Olsen Brothers. In 2012, "Should've Known Better" performed by Soluna Samay qualified to the final placing twenty-third.

As part of its duties as participating broadcaster, DR organises the selection of its entry in the Eurovision Song Contest and broadcasts the event in the country. The broadcaster confirmed its intentions to participate at the 2013 contest on 27 May 2012. DR has selected all but one of its Eurovision entries through the national final Dansk Melodi Grand Prix. On 10 July 2012, the broadcaster announced that Dansk Melodi Grand Prix 2013 would be organised in order to select its entry for the 2013 contest.

== Before Eurovision ==
=== Dansk Melodi Grand Prix 2013 ===
Dansk Melodi Grand Prix 2013 was the 43rd edition of Dansk Melodi Grand Prix, the music competition organised by DR to selects its entries for the Eurovision Song Contest. The event was held on 26 January 2013 at the Jyske Bank Boxen in Herning, hosted by Lise Rønne, Louise Wolff and Sofie Lassen-Kahlke and televised on DR1 as well as streamed online at the official DR website. The national final was watched by 1.785 million viewers in Denmark.

==== Format ====
Ten songs competed in one show where the winner was determined over two rounds of voting. In the first round, the top three songs based on the combination of votes from a public televote and a five-member jury panel qualified to the superfinal. In the superfinal, the winner was determined again by the votes of the jury and public. Viewers were able to vote via SMS.

The five-member jury panel was composed of:

- Mich Hedin Hansen (Cutfather) – songwriter and music producer
- Lis Sørensen – singer
- Jørgen de Mylius – television and radio host, 23-times Eurovision commentator for DR
- Maria Lucia – musical actress and singer
- Kato – DJ and music producer

==== Competing entries ====
DR opened a submission period between 10 July 2012 and 24 September 2012 for artists and composers to submit their entries. The entertainment director for DR, Jan Lagermand Lundme, stated that the competition would seek out "songs that have a strong chorus". The broadcaster received a record breaking 692 entries during the submission period; the previous record was set in 2009 when the broadcaster received 684 entries. A selection committee selected seven songs from the entries submitted to the broadcaster, while three of the participants were invited to compete based on editorial considerations. DR held a press meet and greet at the DR Byen in Copenhagen on 16 January 2013 where the competing artists and songs were announced and officially presented. Among the artists was Brinck who represented Denmark in 2009.

Artist	Song	Songwriter(s)	Selection
Albin	"Beautiful to Me"	Brian Risberg Clausen, Mads Haugaard	Open submission
Brinck	"Human"	Niels Brinck Kristensen	Open submission
Daze	"We Own the Universe"	Thomas G:son, Peter Boström	Open submission
Emmelie de Forest	"Only Teardrops"	Lise Cabble, Julia Fabrin Jakobsen, Thomas Stengaard	Open submission
Frederikke Vedel	"Jeg har hele tiden vidst det"	Pernille Georgi, Thomas Reil, Jeppe Reil	Open submission
Jack Rowan feat. Sam Gray	"Invincible"	Achmad Darwich, Markus Bøgelund, Sam Gray	Invited by DR
Kate Hall	"I'm Not Alone"	Lars Halvor Jensen, Martin Michael Larsson, Michelle Bell, Oscar Holter, Jakke Erixson, Simon Hermansen	Open submission
Louise Dubiel	"Rejs dig op"	Casper Lindstad, Rune Braager, Louise Dubiel	Invited by DR
Mohamed Ali	"Unbreakable"	Morten Friis, Michael Parsberg, Peter Bjørnskov, Lene Dissing	Invited by DR
Simone	"Stay Awake"	Lars Halvor Jensen, Carsten Lindberg	Open submission

==== Final ====
The final took place on 26 January 2013. In the first round of voting the top three advanced to the superfinal based on the votes of a five-member jury (50%) and a public televote (50%). In the superfinal, the winner, "Only Teardrops" performed by Emmelie de Forest, was selected by the public and jury vote. The viewers and the juries each had a total of 30 points to award in the superfinal. Each juror distributed their points as follows: 1, 2 and 3 points. The viewer vote was based on the percentage of votes each song achieved. For example, if a song gained 10% of the viewer vote, then that entry would be awarded 10% of 30 points rounded to the nearest integer: 3 points.

In addition to the performances of the competing entries, Soluna Samay (who represented Denmark in 2012), Brotherhood of Man (who won Eurovision for the United Kingdom in 1976), Johnny Logan (who won Eurovision for Ireland in 1980 and 1987), and Herreys (who won Eurovision for Sweden in 1984), performed as the interval acts.

Final – 26 January 2013
R/O	Artist	Song	Result
1	Frederikke Vedel	"Jeg har hele tiden vidst det"	—N/a
2	Brinck	"Human"	—N/a
3	Kate Hall	"I'm Not Alone"	—N/a
4	Louise Dubiel	"Rejs dig op"	—N/a
5	Daze	"We Own the Universe"	—N/a
6	Simone	"Stay Awake"	Advanced
7	Jack Rowan feat. Sam Gray	"Invincible"	—N/a
8	Emmelie de Forest	"Only Teardrops"	Advanced
9	Albin	"Beautiful to Me"	—N/a
10	Mohamed Ali	"Unbreakable"	Advanced

Superfinal – 26 January 2013
R/O	Artist	Song	Jury	Televote	Total	Place
1	Simone	"Stay Awake"	8	7	15	3
2	Emmelie de Forest	"Only Teardrops"	11	15	26	1
3	Mohamed Ali	"Unbreakable"	11	8	19	2

Detailed Jury Votes
R/O	Song	Cutfather	L. Sørensen	J. de Mylius	M. Lucia	Kato	Total
1	"Stay Awake"	1	1	2	2	2	8
2	"Only Teardrops"	3	3	3	1	1	11
3	"Unbreakable"	2	2	1	3	3	11

=== Promotion ===
Emmelie de Forest made several appearances across Europe to specifically promote "Only Teardrops" as the Danish Eurovision entry. On 12 April, Emmelie de Forest appeared during the SVT1 programme Gomorron Sverige in Sweden. On 21 April, de Forest performed during the London Eurovision Party, which was held at the Shadow Lounge venue in London, United Kingdom and hosted by Nicki French and Paddy O'Connell.

== At Eurovision ==
According to Eurovision rules, all nations with the exceptions of the host country and the "Big Five" (France, Germany, Italy, Spain, and the United Kingdom) are required to qualify from one of two semi-finals in order to compete for the final; the top ten countries from each semi-final progress to the final. The European Broadcasting Union (EBU) split up the competing countries into six different pots based on voting patterns from previous contests, with countries with favourable voting histories put into the same pot. On 17 January 2013, an allocation draw was held which placed each country into one of the two semi-finals, as well as which half of the show they would perform in. Denmark was placed into the first semi-final, to be held on 14 May 2013, and was scheduled to perform in the first half of the show.

Once all the competing songs for the 2013 contest had been released, the running order for the semi-finals was decided by the shows' producers rather than through another draw, so that similar songs were not placed next to each other. Denmark was set to perform in position 5, following the entry from Croatia and before the entry from Russia.

The two semi-finals and final were broadcast on DR1 with commentary by Ole Tøpholm. DR appointed Sofie Lassen-Kahlke as its spokesperson to announce the Danish votes during the final.

=== Semi-final ===
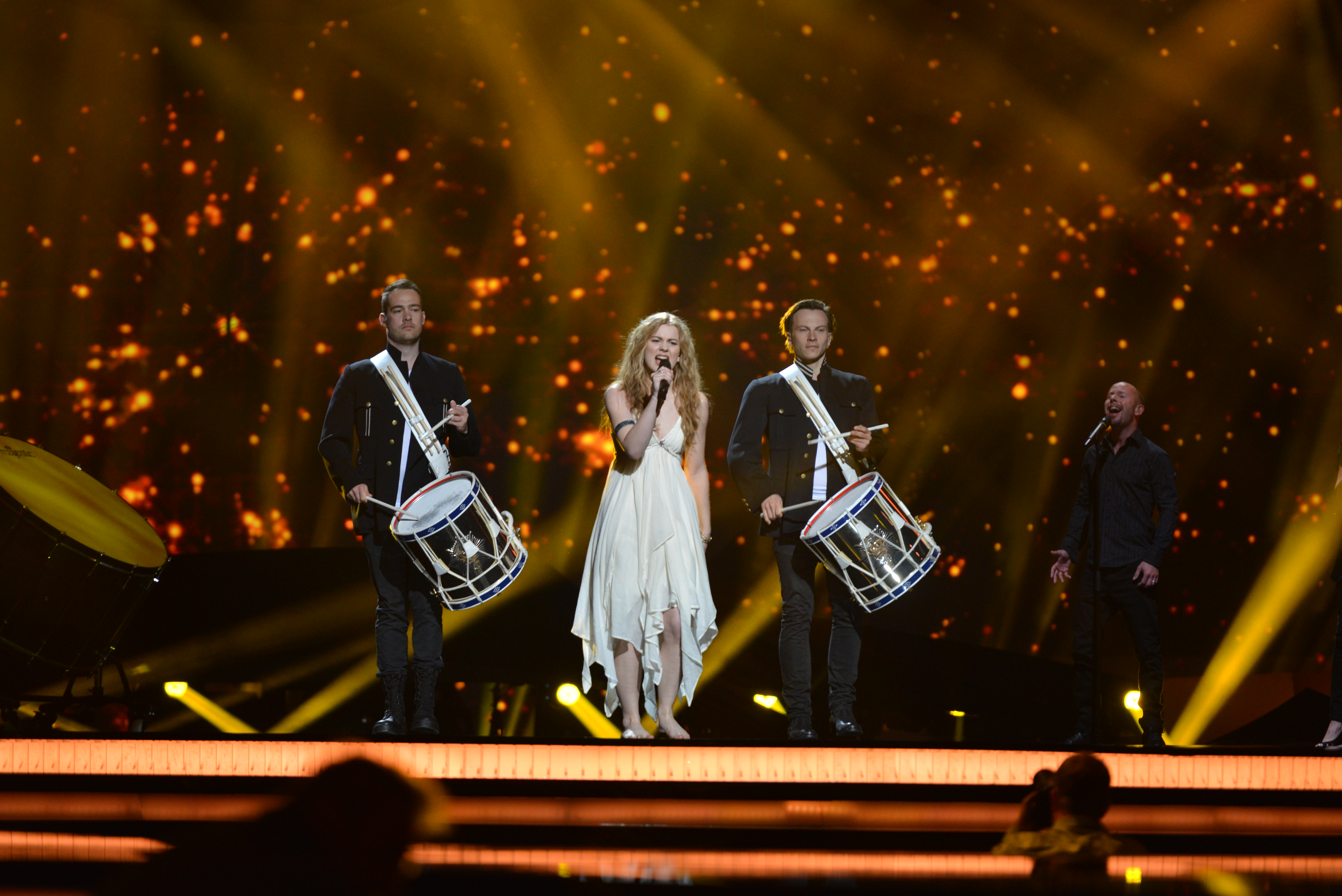
Emmelie de Forest during a rehearsal before the first semi-final

Emmelie de Forest took part in technical rehearsals on 6 and 10 May, followed by dress rehearsals on 13 and 14 May. This included the jury show on 13 May where the professional juries of each country watched and voted on the competing entries.

The Danish performance featured Emmelie de Forest in a cream coloured loose tank dress designed by Danish designer Anja Elefteria and performing with two drummers, one of them who also played the penny whistle, and three backing vocalists. The stage colours were predominantly red, yellow and orange and the performance also featured a pyrotechnic fountain effect. The two drummers that joined Emmelie de Forest were Jacob Baagøe Thomsen and Morten Specht Larsen, while the three backing vocalists were: Anne Murillo, Heidi Degn and Anders Øhrstrøm.

At the end of the show, Denmark was announced as having finished in the top 10 and subsequently qualifying for the grand final. It was later revealed that Denmark placed first in the semi-final, receiving a total of 167 points.

=== Final ===
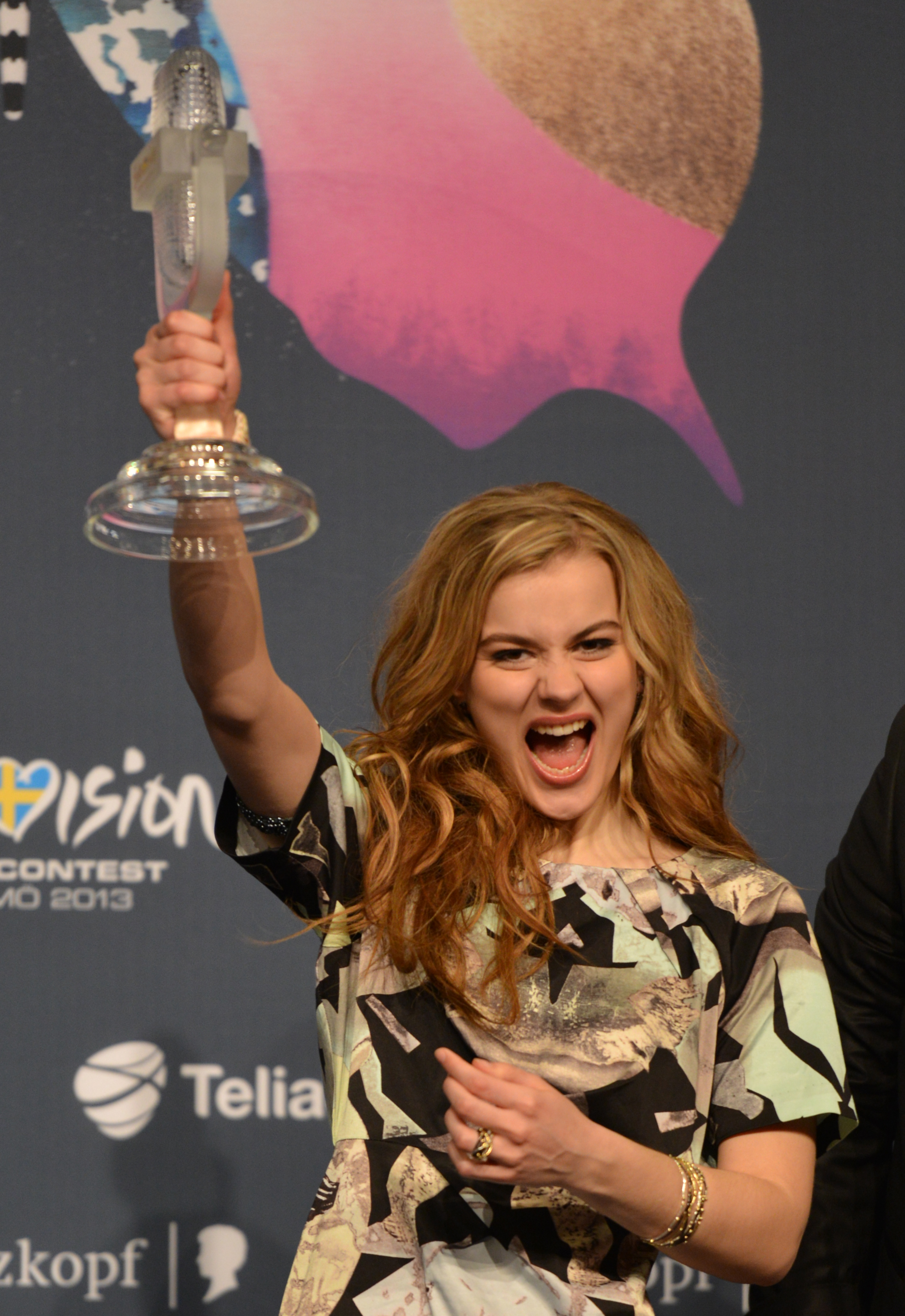
Emmelie de Forest during the winner's press conference

Shortly after the first semi-final, a winners' press conference was held for the ten qualifying countries. As part of this press conference, the qualifying artists took part in a draw to determine which half of the grand final they would subsequently participate in. This draw was done in the order the countries appeared in the semi-final running order. Denmark was drawn to compete in the second half. Following this draw, the shows' producers decided upon the running order of the final, as they had done for the semi-finals. Denmark was subsequently placed to perform in position 18, following the entry from Hungary and before the entry from Iceland.

Emmelie de Forest once again took part in dress rehearsals on 17 and 18 May before the final, including the jury final where the professional juries cast their final votes before the live show. Emmelie de Forest performed a repeat of her semi-final performance during the final on 18 May. Denmark won the contest placing first with a score of 281 points. This was Denmark's third victory in the Eurovision Song Contest; their last victory was in 2000.

=== Voting ===
Voting during the three shows consisted of 50 percent public televoting and 50 percent from a jury deliberation. The jury consisted of five music industry professionals who were citizens of the country they represent. This jury was asked to judge each contestant based on: vocal capacity; the stage performance; the song's composition and originality; and the overall impression by the act. In addition, no member of a national jury could be related in any way to any of the competing acts in such a way that they cannot vote impartially and independently. The following members comprised the Danish jury: television and radio host Jørgen de Mylius, singer Soluna Samay (who represented Denmark in 2012), producer Chief 1 (Lars Pedersen), singer and actress Kaya Brüel, and singer Jimmy Colding.

Following the release of the full split voting by the EBU after the conclusion of the competition, it was revealed that Denmark had placed first with both the public televote and the jury vote in the semi-final. In the public vote, Denmark received an average rank of 3.33, while with the jury vote, Denmark received an average rank of 3.58. In the final, Denmark had also placed first with both the public televote and the jury vote. In the public vote, Denmark received an average rank of 4.97, while with the jury vote, Denmark received an average rank of 6.23.

Below is a breakdown of points awarded to Denmark and awarded by Denmark in the first semi-final and grand final of the contest. The nation awarded its 12 points to Russia in the semi-final and to Norway in the final of the contest.

==== Points awarded to Denmark ====
Points awarded to Denmark (Semi-final 1)
Score	Country
12 points	Austria; Croatia; Estonia; Ireland; Netherlands; Sweden; United Kingdom
10 points	Belgium; Russia
8 points	Belarus; Cyprus; Montenegro; Serbia; Slovenia
7 points	Moldova
6 points	Italy; Lithuania
5 points	
4 points	Ukraine
3 points	
2 points	
1 point	

Points awarded to Denmark (Final)
Score	Country
12 points	France; Iceland; Ireland; Italy; Macedonia; Serbia; Slovenia; United Kingdom
10 points	Belgium; Croatia; Germany; Hungary; Montenegro; Netherlands; Sweden
8 points	Estonia; Israel; Spain
7 points	Cyprus; Finland; Georgia; Greece; Norway
6 points	Malta; Moldova; Latvia; Romania
5 points	Austria; Azerbaijan; Ukraine
4 points	Armenia; Russia
3 points	Switzerland
2 points	Bulgaria; Lithuania
1 point	Albania; Belarus

==== Points awarded by Denmark ====
Points awarded by Denmark (Semi-final 1)
Score	Country
12 points	Russia
10 points	Netherlands
8 points	Ukraine
7 points	Belgium
6 points	Moldova
5 points	Montenegro
4 points	Austria
3 points	Ireland
2 points	Lithuania
1 point	Estonia

Points awarded by Denmark (Final)
Score	Country
12 points	Norway
10 points	Netherlands
8 points	Sweden
7 points	Russia
6 points	Greece
5 points	Belgium
4 points	Malta
3 points	Ukraine
2 points	Finland
1 point	Iceland

===== Jury rankings by Denmark =====
Jury ranking by Denmark (Semi-final 1)
Rank	Country
1	Russia
2	Austria
3	Ukraine
4	Moldova
5	Netherlands
6	Estonia
7	Belgium
8	Montenegro
9	Croatia
10	Lithuania
11	Cyprus
12	Serbia
13	Ireland
14	Belarus
15	Slovenia

Jury ranking by Denmark (Final)
Rank	Country
1	Russia
2	Sweden
3	Netherlands
4	Belgium
5	Moldova
6	Norway
7	Ukraine
8	France
9	Greece
10	United Kingdom
11	Finland
12	Estonia
13	Georgia
14	Germany
15	Italy
16	Ireland
17	Malta
18	Azerbaijan
19	Hungary
20	Lithuania
21	Spain
22	Iceland
23	Armenia
24	Romania
25	Belarus
