= Alyona Lanskaya =

Belarusian singer (born 1985)

Alyona Lanskaya Алена Ланская
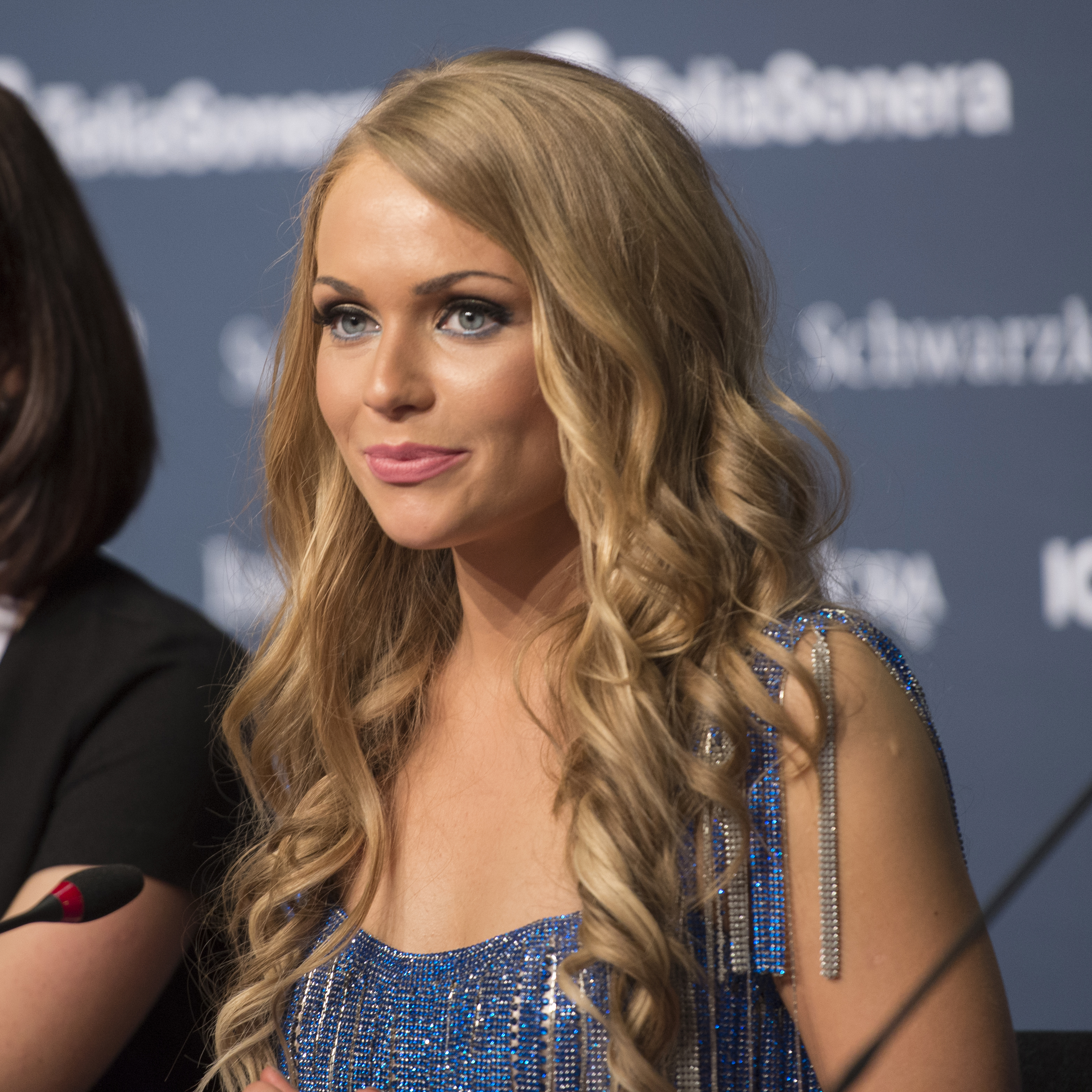
- Alyona Lanskaya at a Eurovision Song Contest 2013 press conference

Background information
- Also known as: Alena Lanskaya
- Born: 7 September 1985 (age 40); Mogilev, Byelorussian SSR, USSR
- Genres: Pop
- Years active: 2011–present
- Label: Spamash
- Website: http://www.spamash.by/ru/alena-lanskaya

Alyona Lanskaya (Belarusian: Алена Ланская, Romanized: Alena Lanskaja; Russian: Алёна Ланская, Romanized: Alyona Lanskaya; born 7 September 1985) is a Belarusian singer. In 2011, she won the Slavianski Bazaar Contest in Vitebsk. Alyona represented Belarus in the Eurovision Song Contest 2013 in Malmö, Sweden with the song "Solayoh", qualifying from the semi-final of the competition and placing 16th in the final by scoring 48 points.

== Career ==
=== Eurofest 2012 ===
After advancing to the semi-finals, held on December 21, 2011, she qualified for the Eurofest 2012 finals as one of the five chosen from the 15 entries. On February 14, 2012, she won the right to represent her country in the Eurovision Song Contest 2012 in Baku, Azerbaijan with her song "All My Life".

However, on February 24, 2012, it was announced that she was disqualified after the Belarusian President conducted an investigation leading to her "unfair" win in Eurofest 10 days earlier after rumors circulated that the producers had rigged the televoting giving her 12 points making her the winner. In response to the allegations, the president ordered an immediate investigation and later confirmed them to be true. She was replaced by Litesound instead, who got second place in Eurofest finals.

=== Eurofest 2013 ===
After the disqualification from Eurofest 2012, Lanskaya entered again the following year to represent Belarus in 2013 with the song "Rhythm of Love" written by Leonid Shirin, Yuri Vashchuk and A. Shirin. On December 7, 2012, Lanskaya won the national final, gaining top marks from both the public and jury vote, and represented Belarus in the Eurovision Song Contest 2013 in Malmö, Sweden. On March 4, 2013, it was revealed Lanskaya's song was officially changed to the song "Solayoh." In 2013, Lanskaya released her second studio album, Solayoh.

== Political views ==
During the 2020 Belarusian presidential elections and the protests that followed them, Alyona Lanskaya actively supported Alexander Lukashenko, and said ex-presidential candidate Sviatlana Tsikhanouskaya was wrong. She described the peaceful actions of the opponents of the authorities in the following words, “Belarusians are simply tired of being poor, and they wanted to become beggars.” Lanskaya performed in the support of Lukashenko's regime, participated in pro-government car rallies.

On January 5, 2021, Alyona Lanskaya's Instagram page, where she shared, among other things, her thoughts on the situation in the country, was blocked. The singer had 22,000 subscribers. She commented on the ban, “You can block me either on VKontakte, or Instagram, or Facebook because social networks have never played such an important role for me as for other people.” At the same time, the singer also stated that if the page is not unblocked within a day, she would file a complaint to the Militsiya to “investigate this case.”

== Discography ==
=== Studio albums ===
- Лабиринты судьбы – 2010
- Solayoh – 2013
- Я жива - 2018

=== Single ===
- "Solayoh" – 2013

=== Other songs ===
- "Everybody Get Up!"
- "Тише-тише"
- "Life is Ok!"
- "Небо знает"
- "Бумажная любовь"
- "Белая ластаўка"
- "Дави на газ"
- "Васiльковае неба"
- "Папараць-кветка"
- "На краю"
- "Солео" (Solayoh Russian vers.)
- "All My Life" - 2011
- "Rhythm of Love" - 2012
- "Сказка о любви" (You're the Lucky One, Russian vers.)
- "You're the Lucky One"
- "Speak"
- "Спит" (Speak, Russian vers.)
- "I'm Alive"
- "Я Жива" (I'm Alive, Russian vers.)

== Videography ==
- Alyona Lanskaya - Спит
- Alyona Lanskaya - Speak
- Alyona Lanskaya - Solayoh
- Alyona Lanskaya - Одинокие сердца

Awards and achievements
| Preceded by Litesound with "We Are the Heroes" | Belarus in the Eurovision Song Contest; 2013 | Succeeded by Teo with "Cheesecake" |
