= Netherlands in the Eurovision Song Contest 2013 =

- Eurovision Song Contest 2013
- Participating broadcaster: Televisie Radio Omroep Stichting (TROS)
- Country: Netherlands
- Selection process: Internal selection
- Announcement date: Artist: 17 October 2012; Song: 11 March 2013

Competing entry
- Song: "Birds"
- Artist: Anouk
- Songwriters: Tore Johansson; Martin Gjerstad; Anouk Teeuwe

Placement
- Semi-final result: Qualified (6th, 75 points)
- Final result: 9th, 114 points

Participation chronology

The Netherlands was represented at the Eurovision Song Contest 2013 with the song "Birds", written by Tore Johansson, Martin Gjerstad, and Anouk Teeuwe, and performed by Anouk herself. The Dutch participating broadcaster, Televisie Radio Omroep Stichting (TROS), internally selected its entry for the contest. Anouk's appointment as the Dutch representative was announced on 17 October 2012, while the song, "Birds", was presented to the public on 11 March 2013.

The Netherlands was drawn to compete in the first semi-final of the Eurovision Song Contest which took place on 14 May 2013. Performing during the show in position 8, "Birds" was announced among the top 10 entries of the first semi-final and therefore qualified to compete in the final on 16 May. It was later revealed that the Netherlands placed sixth out of the 16 participating countries in the semi-final with 75 points. In the final, the Netherlands placed ninth out of the 26 participating countries, scoring 114 points.

== Background ==
Prior to the 2013 contest, Televisie Radio Omroep Stichting (TROS) and its predecessor national broadcasters have participated in the Eurovision Song Contest representing the Netherlands fifty-three times since NTS début in 1956. They have won the contest four times: in 1957 with the song "Net als toen" performed by Corry Brokken; in 1959 with the song "'n Beetje" performed by Teddy Scholten; in 1969 as one of four countries to tie for first place with "De troubadour" performed by Lenny Kuhr; and finally in 1975 with "Ding-a-dong" performed by the group Teach-In. Following the introduction of semi-finals for the 2004 contest, the Netherlands had featured in only one final. The Dutch least successful result has been last place, which they have achieved on five occasions, most recently in the second semi-final of the 2011 contest. The Netherlands has also received nul points on two occasions; in 1962 and 1963.

As part of its duties as participating broadcaster, TROS organises the selection of its entry in the Eurovision Song Contest and broadcasts the event in the country. The Dutch broadcaster has used various methods to select its entry in the past, such as the Nationaal Songfestival, a live televised national final to choose the performer, song or both to compete at Eurovision. However, internal selections have also been held on occasion. Since 2010, TROS has organised Nationaal Songfestival in order to select its entry, however for 2013, the broadcaster opted to select its entry through an internal selection.

== Before Eurovision ==
=== Internal selection ===
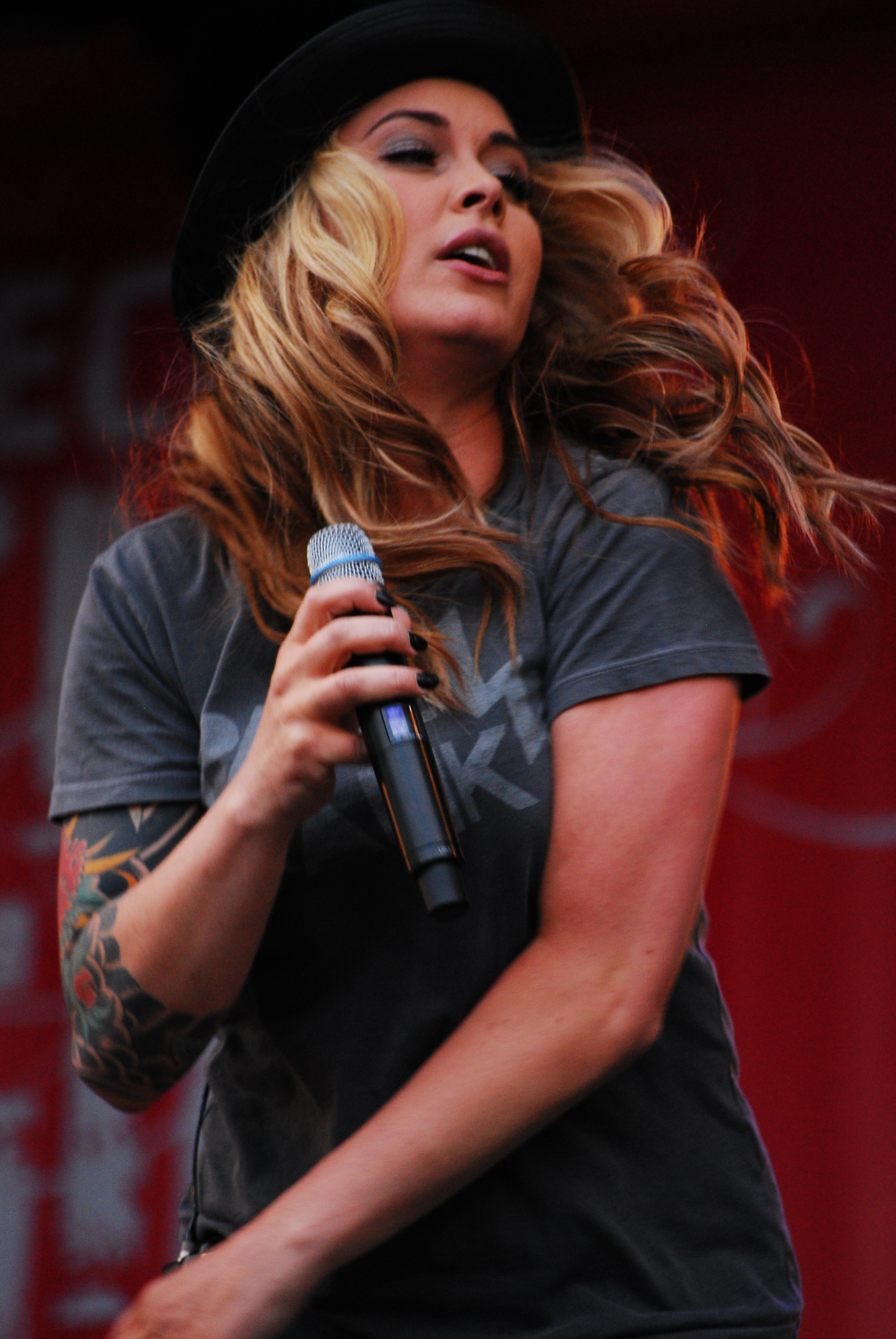
Anouk was internally selected to represent the Netherlands in the Eurovision Song Contest 2013

Following Joan Franka's failure to qualify to the final in 2012 with the song "You and Me", TROS internally selected both the artist and song for the Eurovision Song Contest 2013. On 15 September 2012, Dutch media reported that TROS had selected singer Anouk to represent the Netherlands at the 2013 contest, after previously stating that she would only be interested if she was internally selected instead of having to participate in a national final. Anouk was confirmed as the Dutch entrant on 17 October 2012 through a video message posted on her Facebook account. In regards to her selection as the Dutch entrant, Anouk stated: "This week I had a meeting with TROS and things went very well. I slept over it for a night, but this morning I woke up and thought: 'I'm going to do it', I think it will be loads of fun!"

On 11 March 2013, Anouk's Eurovision entry, "Birds", was presented to the public during a press conference that took place in Hilversum. The song was premiered at the same time during the Radio Sterren programme LuiLekkerLucas, hosted by Lucas van Leeuwen. "Birds" was written by Tore Johansson, Martin Gjerstad and Anouk herself, and was featured as part of her upcoming album Sad Singalong Songs.

== At Eurovision ==
According to Eurovision rules, all nations with the exceptions of the host country and the "Big Five" (France, Germany, Italy, Spain and the United Kingdom) are required to qualify from one of two semi-finals in order to compete for the final; the top ten countries from each semi-final progress to the final. The European Broadcasting Union (EBU) split up the competing countries into six different pots based on voting patterns from previous contests, with countries with favourable voting histories put into the same pot. On 17 January 2013, a special allocation draw was held which placed each country into one of the two semi-finals, as well as which half of the show they would perform in. The Netherlands was placed into the first semi-final, to be held on 14 May 2013, and was scheduled to perform in the first half of the show.

Once all the competing songs for the 2013 contest had been released, the running order for the semi-finals was decided by the shows' producers rather than through another draw, so that similar songs were not placed next to each other. The Netherlands was set to perform in position 8, following the entry from Ukraine and before the entry from Montenegro.

The two semi-finals and the final was broadcast in the Netherlands on Nederland 1 and BVN with commentary by Jan Smit and Daniël Dekker. The Dutch spokesperson, who announced the Dutch votes during the final, was Cornald Maas.

=== Semi-final ===
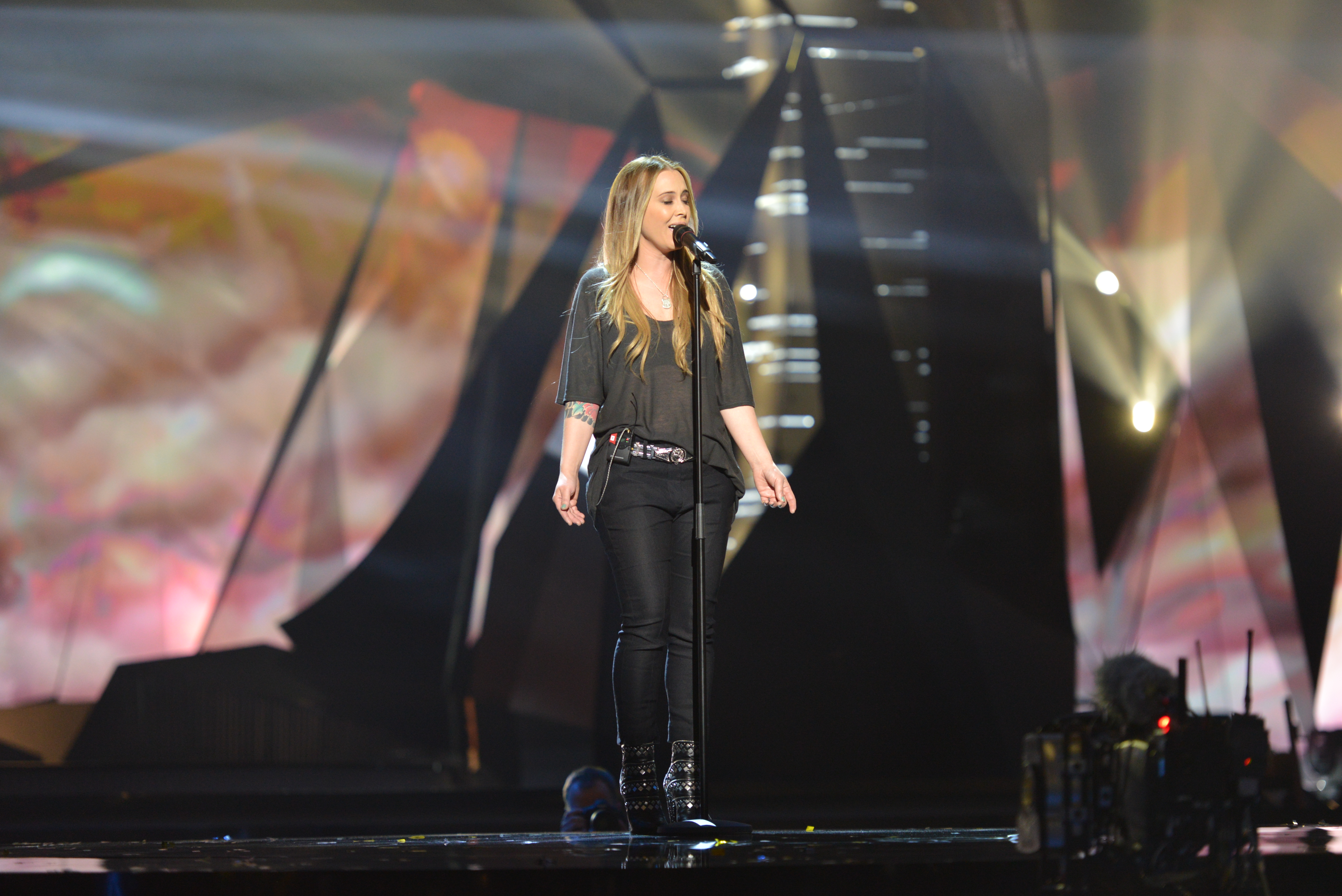
Anouk during a rehearsal before the first semi-final

Anouk took part in technical rehearsals on 3 and 6 May, followed by dress rehearsals on 9 and 10 May. This included the jury show on 9 May where the professional juries of each country watched and voted on the competing entries.

The Dutch performance featured Anouk in a black outfit and performing at a microphone stand on the catwalk together with three backing vocalists behind on the main stage. The stage transitioned from dark to lighter tones with spotlights on the performers as well as birds and colorful motives projecting on the background. The three backing vocalists that joined Anouk were: Shirma Rouse, Ricardo Burgrust and Yerry Rellum.

At the end of the show, the Netherlands was announced as having finished in the top 10 and subsequently qualifying for the grand final. This marked the first time since 2004 that the Netherlands qualified to the final of the Eurovision Song Contest from a semi-final. It was later revealed that the Netherlands placed sixth in the semi-final, receiving a total of 75 points.

=== Final ===
Shortly after the first semi-final, a winners' press conference was held for the ten qualifying countries. As part of this press conference, the qualifying artists took part in a draw to determine which half of the grand final they would subsequently participate in. This draw was done in the order the countries appeared in the semi-final running order. The Netherlands was drawn to compete in the first half. Following this draw, the shows' producers decided upon the running order of the final, as they had done for the semi-finals. The Netherlands was subsequently placed to perform in position 13, following the entry from Armenia and before the entry from Romania.

Anouk once again took part in dress rehearsals on 17 and 18 May before the final, including the jury final where the professional juries cast their final votes before the live show. Anouk performed a repeat of her semi-final performance during the final on 18 May. At the conclusion of the voting, the Netherlands finished in ninth place with 114 points.

=== Voting ===
Voting during the three shows consisted of 50 percent public televoting and 50 percent from a jury deliberation. The jury consisted of five music industry professionals who were citizens of the country they represent. This jury was asked to judge each contestant based on: vocal capacity; the stage performance; the song's composition and originality; and the overall impression by the act. In addition, no member of a national jury could be related in any way to any of the competing acts in such a way that they cannot vote impartially and independently. The following members comprised the Dutch jury: Nancy Coolen (singer and television presenter), Carlo Boszhard (television presenter and musical actor), Kim-Lian van der Meij (musical actress, television presenter and singer-songwriter), Eric van Tijn (music producer) and Cornald Maas (television presenter). Jeroen Nieuwenhuize (DJ) and André de Graaf (music publisher) replaced van Tijn and Maas for the final in accordance with the rules of the 2013 contest.

Following the release of the full split voting by the EBU after the conclusion of the competition, it was revealed that the Netherlands had placed eleventh with the public televote and seventh with the jury vote in the final. In the public vote, the Netherlands received an average rank of 11.70, while with the jury vote, the Netherlands received an average rank of 9.05. In the first semi-final, the Netherlands placed ninth with the public televote with an average rank of 7.94 and sixth with the jury vote with an average rank of 6.42.

Below is a breakdown of points awarded to the Netherlands and awarded by the Netherlands in the first semi-final and grand final of the contest. The nation awarded its 12 points to Denmark in the semi-final and to Belgium in the final of the contest.

==== Points awarded to the Netherlands ====
Points awarded to the Netherlands (Semi-final 1)
Score	Country
12 points	Belgium
10 points	Denmark
8 points	Austria; Sweden; United Kingdom
7 points	Estonia; Lithuania
6 points	
5 points	Ireland
4 points	
3 points	Russia; Slovenia
2 points	Montenegro
1 point	Italy; Serbia

Points awarded to the Netherlands (Final)
Score	Country
12 points	Belgium
10 points	Denmark
8 points	Austria; Finland; Iceland; Norway; Sweden
7 points	Estonia; Slovenia
6 points	Ireland; United Kingdom
5 points	Hungary
4 points	Albania; Lithuania; Switzerland
3 points	Russia
2 points	Croatia; Macedonia; Romania
1 point	

==== Points awarded by the Netherlands ====
Points awarded by the Netherlands (Semi-final 1)
Score	Country
12 points	Denmark
10 points	Belgium
8 points	Ukraine
7 points	Russia
6 points	Moldova
5 points	Ireland
4 points	Estonia
3 points	Croatia
2 points	Belarus
1 point	Serbia

Points awarded by the Netherlands (Final)
Score	Country
12 points	Belgium
10 points	Denmark
8 points	Malta
7 points	Hungary
6 points	Norway
5 points	Ukraine
4 points	Russia
3 points	Sweden
2 points	Azerbaijan
1 point	Greece

===== Jury ranking by the Netherlands =====
Jury ranking by the Netherlands (Semi-final 1)
Rank	Country
1	Denmark
2	Ukraine
3	Moldova
4	Estonia
5	Russia
6	Belgium
7	Ireland
8	Belarus
9	Austria
10	Cyprus
11	Lithuania
12	Croatia
13	Slovenia
14	Montenegro
15	Serbia

Jury ranking by the Netherlands (Final)
Rank	Country
1	Norway
2	Sweden
3	Denmark
4	Ukraine
5	Belgium
6	Moldova
7	Malta
8	Hungary
9	Estonia
10	Russia
11	Finland
12	France
13	Azerbaijan
14	Iceland
15	Italy
16	Ireland
17	Romania
18	Belarus
19	United Kingdom
20	Georgia
21	Germany
22	Greece
23	Spain
24	Lithuania
25	Armenia
