= Serbia in the Eurovision Song Contest 2013 =

- Eurovision Song Contest 2013
- Participating broadcaster: Radio Television of Serbia (RTS)
- Country: Serbia
- Selection process: Beosong 2013
- Selection date: 3 March 2013

Competing entry
- Song: "Ljubav je svuda"
- Artist: Moje 3
- Songwriters: Saša Milošević Mare; Marina Tucaković

Placement
- Semi-final result: Failed to qualify (11th)

Participation chronology

Serbia was represented at the Eurovision Song Contest 2013 with the song "Ljubav je svuda" written by Saša Milošević Mare and Marina Tucaković. The song was performed by Moje 3, which among its members included Nevena Božović who had previously represented Serbia in the Junior Eurovision Song Contest in 2007 where she placed third with the song "Piši mi". The Serbian national broadcaster, Radio Television of Serbia (RTS) organised the national final Beosong 2013 in order to select the Serbian entry for the 2013 contest in Malmö, Sweden. The national final consisted of two shows: a semi-final and a final on 2 and 3 March 2013, respectively. Fifteen entries competed in the semi-final where a public televote selected the top five to qualify to the final. The five qualifiers competed in the final which resulted in "Ljubav je svuda" performed by Moje 3 as the winner entirely by a public televote.

Serbia was drawn to compete in the first semi-final of the Eurovision Song Contest which took place on 14 May 2013. Performing as the closing entry during the show in position 16, "Ljubav je svuda" was not announced among the top 10 entries of the first semi-final and therefore did not qualify to compete in the final. It was later revealed that Serbia placed eleventh out of the 16 participating countries in the semi-final with 46 points.

== Background ==
Prior to the 2013 contest, Serbia had participated in the Eurovision Song Contest six times since its first entry in 2007, winning the contest with their debut entry "Molitva" performed by Marija Šerifović. Since 2007, five out of six of Serbia's entries have featured in the final with the nation failing to qualify in 2009. Serbia's 2012 entry "Nije ljubav stvar" performed by Željko Joksimović secured the country's second highest placing in the contest to this point, qualifying to the final and placed third.

The Serbian national broadcaster, Radio Television of Serbia (RTS), broadcasts the event within Serbia and organises the selection process for the nation's entry. RTS confirmed their intentions to participate at the 2013 Eurovision Song Contest on 28 November 2012. Between 2007 and 2009, Serbia used the Beovizija national final in order to select their entry. However, after their 2009 entry, "Cipela" performed by Marko Kon and Milaan, failed to qualify Serbia to the final, the broadcaster shifted their selection strategy to selecting specific composers to create songs for artists. In 2010, RTS selected Goran Bregović to compose songs for a national final featuring three artists, while in 2011 Kornelije Kovač, Aleksandra Kovač and Kristina Kovač were tasked with composing one song each. In 2012, RTS internally selected the Serbian entry.

== Before Eurovision ==
=== Beosong 2013 ===
Beosong 2013 was the national final organised by RTS in order to select the Serbian entry for the Eurovision Song Contest 2013. The selection consisted of a semi-final featuring fifteen songs and a final featuring five songs to be held on 2 and 3 March 2013, respectively. Both shows were hosted by Maja Nikolić with backstage interviews conducted by Gorica Nešović and Dragan Ilić. The two shows were broadcast on RTS1, RTS HD and RTS Sat as well as streamed online via the broadcaster's website rts.rs and the official Eurovision Song Contest website eurovision.tv.

==== Competing entries ====
Artists and songwriters were able to submit their entries between 1 December 2012 and 20 January 2013. Artists were required to be Serb citizens and submit entries in one of the official languages of the Republic of Serbia, while songwriters of any nationality were allowed to submit songs. At the closing of the deadline, 171 submissions were received. A selection committee reviewed the submissions and selected fifteen entries to proceed to the national final. The selection committee consisted of Biljana Krstić (Radio Belgrade music editor), Momčilo Bajagić (musician and composer), Vladimir Maričić (composer and pianist), Dragoslav Stanisavljević (RTS editor-in-chief for jazz section) and Dobroslav Predić (RTS music editor). The selected competing entries were announced on 31 January 2013.

Artist	Song	Songwriter(s)
Aleksandra Dabić	"Savršen kraj" (Савршен крај)	Dobrivoje Marić – Čarli
Dušan Svilar	"Spas" (Спас)	Marko Đurašević Mahoni, Rastko Savić
Dušan Zrnić	"Što prolazim" (Што пролазим)	Ana Bojić Mrđen
Igor Terzija	"Moja svetlosti" (Моја светлости)	Aleksandar Filipović, Rastko Savić
Kal	"Kadifa usne" (Кадифа усне)	Dragan Ristić, Dušica Milanović - Marika
Kristina Savić	"Za tebe živim" (За тебе живим)	Vojkan Borisavljević, Vladan Savić
Ksenija Kočetova	"Svetla pale se za nas" (Светла пале се за нас)	Maksim Kočetov, Ksenija Kočetova, Toni Malbašić
Maja Nikolić	"Blagoslov" (Благослов)	Marc Paelinck, Maja Nikolić
Maja Odžaklievska	"Anđeo s neba" (Анђео с неба)	Nikola Burovac, Sonja Buljan
Marija Mihajlović	"Halo" (Хало)	Nikola Čuturilo
Moje 3	"Ljubav je svuda" (Љубав је свуда)	Saša Milošević Mare, Marina Tucaković
Nenad Milosavljević	"Ruža od baruta" (Ружа од барута)	Nenad Milosavljević, Vladimir Dulović
Saška Janković	"Duga u tvojim očima" (Дуга у твојим очима)	Slobodan Boban Petrović
SKY's	"Magija" (Магија)	Wikluh Sky
Žarko Stepanov	"Tren" (Трен)	Ivan Ilić

==== Semi-final ====
The semi-final took place at the studios of RTS in Košutnjak, Belgrade on 2 March 2013 where fifteen songs competed. The five qualifiers for the final were decided exclusively by the Serbian public via SMS voting.

Semi-final – 2 March 2013
R/O	Artist	Song	Televote	Place
1	Moje 3	"Ljubav je svuda"	10,994	1
2	Igor Terzija	"Moja svetlosti"	578	15
3	Maja Nikolić	"Blagoslov"	769	11
4	Kal	"Kadifa usne"	1,553	7
5	Nenad Milosavljević	"Ruža od baruta"	1,495	8
6	Saška Janković	"Duga u tvojim očima"	3,628	3
7	Dušan Zrnić	"Što prolazim"	590	14
8	Maja Odžaklievska	"Anđeo s neba"	616	13
9	Dušan Svilar	"Spas"	7,518	2
10	SKY's	"Magija"	1,995	4
11	Ksenija Kočetova	"Svetla pale se za nas"	618	12
12	Marija Mihajlović	"Halo"	1,691	5
13	Aleksandra Dabić	"Savršen kraj"	1,614	6
14	Kristina Savić	"Za tebe živim"	894	9
15	Žarko Stepanov	"Tren"	894	10

==== Final ====
The final took place at the studios of RTS in Košutnjak, Belgrade on 3 March 2013 and featured the five qualifiers from the preceding semi-final. The winner, "Ljubav je svuda" performed by Moje 3, was decided exclusively by the Serbian public via SMS voting. Former Serbian Eurovision contestant Marija Šerifović, who won the contest in 2007, and singer Oliver Mandić were featured as guest performers during the show.

Final – 3 March 2013
R/O	Artist	Song	Televote	Place
1	Saška Janković	"Duga u tvojim očima"	6,471	3
2	SKY's	"Magija"	3,403	5
3	Dušan Svilar	"Spas"	20,298	2
4	Marija Mihajlović	"Halo"	5,013	4
5	Moje 3	"Ljubav je svuda"	25,959	1

=== Promotion ===
The RTS announced on 17 March 2013 that Moje 3 would release other versions of "Ljubav je svuda" in order to promote the song. On 27 April, eight new versions of "Ljubav je svuda" were released; they include the official versions in Serbian and English, as well as pop rock, ballad and karaoke versions of the song in both languages. The lyrics of the English version of the song, "Love Is All Around Us", were written by Chanoa Chen and Dunja Vujadinović.

On 13 April 2013, Moje 3 performed "Ljubav je svuda" at the Eurovision In Concert in Amsterdam on 13 April 2013.

== At Eurovision ==
According to Eurovision rules, all nations with the exceptions of the host country and the "Big Five" (France, Germany, Italy, Spain and the United Kingdom) are required to qualify from one of two semi-finals in order to compete for the final; the top ten countries from each semi-final progress to the final. The European Broadcasting Union (EBU) split up the competing countries into six different pots based on voting patterns from previous contests, with countries with favourable voting histories put into the same pot. On 17 January 2013, a special allocation draw was held which placed each country into one of the two semi-finals, as well as which half of the show they would perform in. Serbia was placed into the first semi-final, to be held on 14 May 2013, and was scheduled to perform in the second half of the show.

Once all the competing songs for the 2013 contest had been released, the running order for the semi-finals was decided by the shows' producers rather than through another draw, so that similar songs were not placed next to each other. Serbia was set to perform last in position 16, following the entry from Belgium.

The two semi-finals were broadcast in Serbia on RTS1, RTS HD and RTS Sat with commentary for the first semi-final by Duška Vučinić-Lučić and commentary for the second semi-final by Marina Nikolić, while the final was broadcast on RTS2, RTS HD and RTS Sat with commentary by Silvana Grujić. The Serbian spokesperson, who announced the Serbian votes during the final, was Maja Nikolić.

=== Semi-final ===
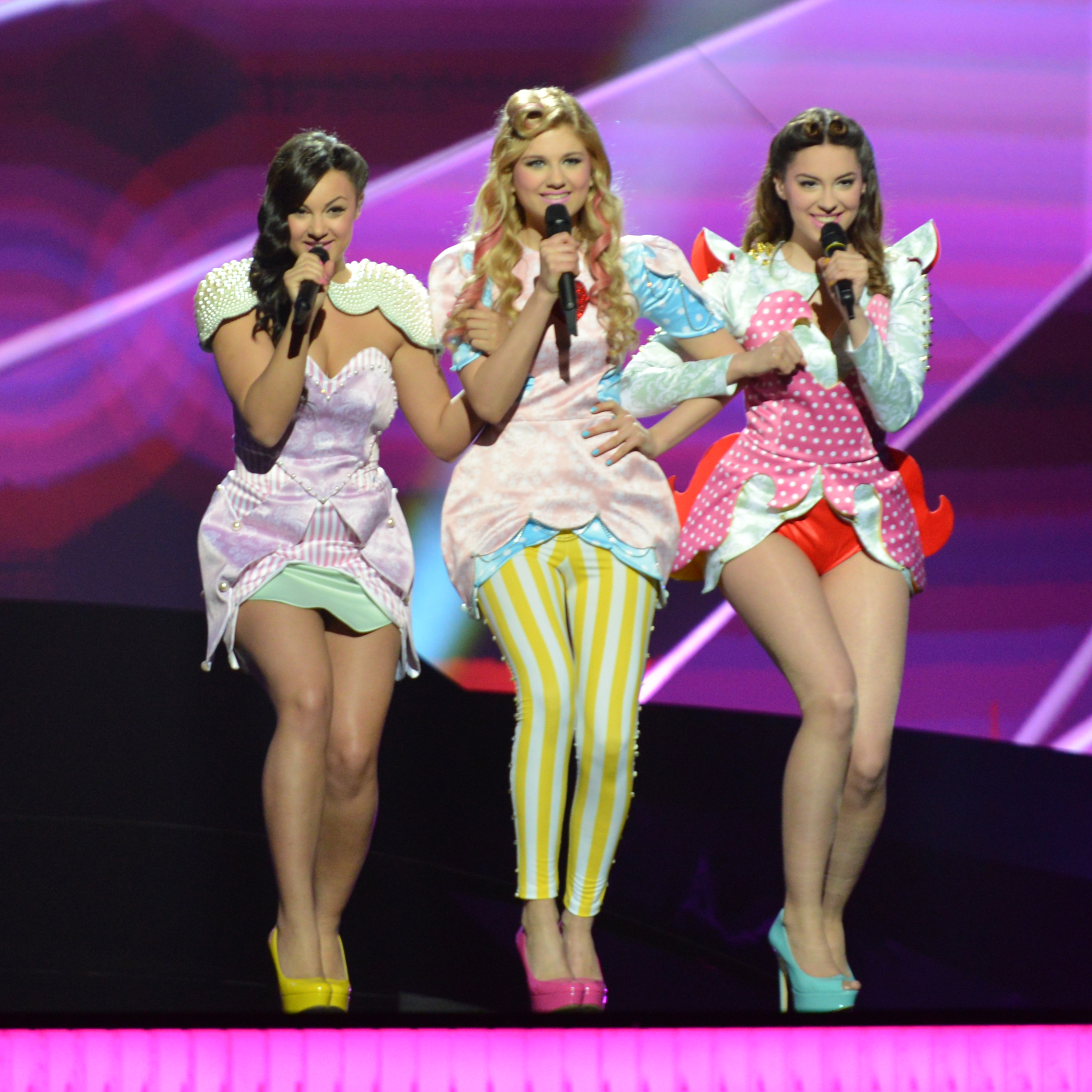
Moje 3 during a rehearsal before the first semi-final

Moje 3 took part in technical rehearsals on 7 and 10 May, followed by dress rehearsals on 13 and 14 May. This included the jury show on 13 May where the professional juries of each country watched and voted on the competing entries.

The Serbian performance featured the members of Moje 3 performing a choreographed routine which included moving in the front of the stage and facing each other. The stage lighting predominately displayed red colours with moving pink spotlights. The director and choreographer of the Serbian performance was Miloš Paunović. The three backing vocalists that joined Moje 3 on stage were: Dunja Vujadinović, Jelena Mitić and Ksenija Miloševic. The stage costumes for the performance were designed by Ana Ljubinković.

At the end of the show, Serbia was not announced among the top 10 entries in the first semi-final and therefore failed to qualify to compete in the final. It was later revealed that Serbia placed eleventh in the semi-final, receiving a total of 46 points.

=== Voting ===
Voting during the three shows consisted of 50 percent public televoting and 50 percent from a jury deliberation. The jury consisted of five music industry professionals who were citizens of the country they represent. This jury was asked to judge each contestant based on: vocal capacity; the stage performance; the song's composition and originality; and the overall impression by the act. In addition, no member of a national jury could be related in any way to any of the competing acts in such a way that they cannot vote impartially and independently.

Following the release of the full split voting by the EBU after the conclusion of the competition, it was revealed that Serbia had placed twelfth with the public televote and fifteenth with the jury vote in the first semi-final. In the public vote, Serbia received an average rank of 8.39, while with the jury vote, Serbia received an average rank of 10.95.

Below is a breakdown of points awarded to Serbia and awarded by Serbia in the first semi-final and grand final of the contest. The nation awarded its 12 points to Montenegro in the semi-final and to Denmark in the final of the contest.

==== Points awarded to Serbia ====
Points awarded to Serbia (Semi-final 1)
Score	Country
12 points	
10 points	Croatia; Montenegro
8 points	
7 points	
6 points	Austria
5 points	Slovenia
4 points	Cyprus; Sweden
3 points	Italy
2 points	Ukraine
1 point	Belarus; Netherlands

==== Points awarded by Serbia ====
Points awarded by Serbia (Semi-final 1)
Score	Country
12 points	Montenegro
10 points	Croatia
8 points	Denmark
7 points	Moldova
6 points	Russia
5 points	Ukraine
4 points	Belarus
3 points	Cyprus
2 points	Austria
1 point	Netherlands

Points awarded by Serbia (Final)
Score	Country
12 points	Denmark
10 points	Ukraine
8 points	Russia
7 points	Norway
6 points	Moldova
5 points	Azerbaijan
4 points	Italy
3 points	Belgium
2 points	Hungary
1 point	Sweden
