= Belarus in the Eurovision Song Contest 2013 =

- Eurovision Song Contest 2013
- Participating broadcaster: Belarusian Television and Radio Company (BTRC)
- Country: Belarus
- Selection process: Artist: National final Song: Internal selection
- Selection date: Artist: 7 December 2012; Song: 7 March 2013

Competing entry
- Song: "Solayoh"
- Artist: Alyona Lanskaya
- Songwriters: Marc Paelinck; Martin King

Placement
- Semi-final result: Qualified (7th, 64 points)
- Final result: 16th, 48 points

Participation chronology

Belarus was represented at the Eurovision Song Contest 2013 with the song "Solayoh", written by Marc Paelinck and Martin King, and performed by Alyona Lanskaya. The Belarusian participating broadcaster, Belarusian Television and Radio Company (BTRC), selected its entry for the contest through a national final. The national final consisted of ten competing acts participating in a televised production where "Rhythm of Love" performed by Alyona Lanskaya was initially selected as the winner following the combination of votes from a jury panel and public televoting, however the singer opted to withdraw her song and the replacement entry, "Solayoh", was announced on 7 March 2013.

Belarus was drawn to compete in the first semi-final of the Eurovision Song Contest which took place on 14 May 2013. Performing during the show in position 16, "Solayoh" was announced among the top 10 entries of the first semi-final and therefore qualified to compete in the final on 18 May. It was later revealed that Belarus placed seventh out of the 16 participating countries in the semi-final with 64 points. In the final, Belarus performed in position 8 and placed sixteenth out of the 26 participating countries, scoring 48 points.

== Background ==
Prior to the 2013 contest, Belarusian Television and Radio Company (BTRC) had participated in the Eurovision Song Contest representing Belarus nine times since its first entry in 2004. Its best placing in the contest was sixth, achieved in 2007 with the song "Work Your Magic" performed by Dmitry Koldun. Following the introduction of semi-finals for the 2004, Belarus had only managed to qualify to the final two times. In 2012, "We Are the Heroes" performed by Litesound failed to qualify to the final.

As part of its duties as participating broadcaster, BTRC organises the selection of its entry in the Eurovision Song Contest and broadcasts the event in the country. The broadcaster has used both internal selections and national finals to select its entry for Eurovision in the past. In 2012, BTRC has organised a national final in order to choose its entry, a selection procedure that continued for its 2013 entry.

== Before Eurovision ==
=== National final ===
The Belarusian national final took place on 7 December 2012. Ten songs participated in the competition and the winner was selected via a jury and a public televote. The show was broadcast on Belarus 1, Belarus 24 and Radius FM as well as online via the broadcaster's official website tvr.by and the Eurovision Song Contest's official website eurovision.tv.

==== Competing entries ====
Artists and composers were able to submit their applications and entries to the broadcaster between 3 October 2012 and 22 October 2012. At the closing of the deadline, 82 entries were received by the broadcaster. Auditions were held on 30 and 31 October 2012 where a jury panel was tasked with selecting up to fifteen entries to proceed to the televised national final. The jury consisted of Gennady Davydko (chairman of the jury, chairman of BTRC), Vasily Rainchik (director of the Youth Variety Theater), Sergey Bondarchuk (director of the Belarusian State Circus), Viktor Volotkovich (head of the department of wind music of the Belarusian State University of Culture and Arts, associate professor at the Belarusian State Academy of Music), Alexander Efremov (artistic director of the Film Actor's Studio Theater), Sergey Kukhto (director of the TV channel "BelMuzTV"), Vladimir Maksimkov (head of the media holding "Karambol"), Marianna Malchik (deputy head of the department of arts, head of the department of concert and festival projects at the Belarusian Ministry of Culture), Alexander Mezhenny (director of the Shtam dance school), Konstantin Mikheev (songwriter and journalist), Larisa Murashko (associate professor at the Belarusian State Academy of Music), Victoria Popova (editor of the culture department of the newspaper "Belarus Today"), Alexander Tikhanovich (chief director and general producer of the production center "Profiartvideon"), Vladimir Ugolnik (associate professor of the department of variety art at the Belarusian State University of Culture and Arts), Andrey Kholodinsky (editor-in-chief and music presenter of the radio station "Alfa Radio"), Tatiana Shcherbina (head of the radio station "Radius FM") and Anatoly Yarmolenko (director of the ensemble Syabry). Ten finalists were selected and announced on 14 November 2012.

Artist	Song	Songwriter(s)
Alexey Gross	"One Way Love"	Marc Paelinck
Alyona Lanskaya	"Rhythm of Love"	Leonid Shirin, Yuriy Vaschuk
Beaver Band	"Incredible Girl"	Leonid Shirin, Alexey Shirin
Daria	"Catch Me Again"	Leonid Shirin, Yuriy Vaschuk
Max Lorens	"I Love Your Charming Eyes"	Valery Shoman, Maxim Sapatkov
Nuteki	"Save Me"	Mikhail Nokarashvili
Satsura	"Get Out of My Way"	Stanislav Satsura
Uzari	"Secret"	Yuri Navrotsky
Vitaliy Voronko	"I Wonder How You"	Vitaliy Voronko
Yankey	"Letter to Mother"	Yan Zhenchak

==== Final ====
The televised final took place on 7 December 2012 at the BTRC "600 Metrov" studio in Minsk, hosted by Olga Ryzhikova and Denis Dudinskiy. Prior to the competition, a draw for the running order took place on 5 December 2012. A 50/50 combination of votes from 14 jury members made up of music professionals and public televoting selected the song "Rhythm of Love" performed by Alyona Lanskaya as the winner. The jury consisted of Gennady Davydko, Vasily Rainchik, Sergey Bondarchuk, Viktor Volotkovich, Alexander Efremov, Sergey Kukhto, Vladimir Maksimkov, Marianna Malchik, Alexander Mezhenny, Larisa Murashko, Victoria Popova, Vladimir Ugolnik, Andrey Kholodinsky and Tatiana Shcherbina.

In addition to the performances from the competitors, the show featured guest performances by 2004 Belarusian Eurovision contestants Aleksandra and Konstantin, 2007 Belarusian Eurovision contestant Dmitry Koldun and Gunesh.

Final – 7 December 2012
R/O	Artist	Song	Jury	Televote		Total	Place
R/O	Artist	Song	Jury	Votes	Points	Total	Place
1	Vitaliy Voronko	"I Wonder How You"	2	1,773	5	7	9
2	Max Lorens	"I Love Your Charming Eyes"	5	1,896	6	11	5
3	Alyona Lanskaya	"Rhythm of Love"	12	10,370	12	24	1
4	Yankey	"Letter to Mother"	8	1,518	2	10	7
5	Beaver Band	"Incredible Girl"	1	1,551	3	4	10
6	Daria	"Catch Me Again"	10	1,432	1	11	4
7	Uzari	"Secret"	3	1,585	4	7	8
8	Alexey Gross	"One Way Love"	4	1,904	7	11	6
9	Nuteki	"Save Me"	7	4,237	10	17	2
10	Satsura	"Get Out of My Way"	6	2,044	8	14	3

=== Song selection ===
Following Alyona Lanskaya's win at the Belarusian national final, BTRC announced that the singer could be performing a song other than "Rhythm of Love" at the Eurovision Song Contest. The national final rules set by BTRC allowed for the winning artist to change their song if they were able to find a more suitable alternative for the contest. In early February 2013, it was announced that Lanskaya recorded several songs at the Abbey Road Studios in London and in Stockholm for her new album and the Eurovision Song Contest, and that four songs were under consideration. On 7 March, BTRC announced that Alyona Lanskaya would be performing the song "Solayoh" at the 2013 Eurovision Song Contest, which officially replaced "Rhythm of Love" as the Belarusian entry through the decision of a jury panel consisting of representatives of BTRC and the production group Spamash. Prior to the announcement, information of "Solayoh" as the replacement song was leaked on 4 March through the German record label CAP-Sounds, which labelled the song as a "Eurovision version" on digital download music websites. The song, written by Marc Paelinck and Martin King, was presented to the public during her performance in the final of the Romanian Eurovision national final on 10 March.

Initially, we have been selecting from 64 songs. Having some Eurovision experience, we have decided to record a number of songs in different countries, in different studios, all performed by Alyona. Then expert council has considered all the variants - who song fits her vocal range, how harmonic is the song in her performance, is the arrangement suitable. After we listened to all songs, 8 have been shortlisted, and later they were cut down to 4.

— Dmitry Baranov, producer of Alyona Lanskaya, in regards to the song selection

Song selection – 6 March 2013
Song	Songwriter(s)
"I'm Alive"	Leonid Shirin
"Kiss Me"	Bernard Lohr
"Rhythm of Love"	Leonid Shirin, Yuriy Vaschuk
"Solayoh"	Marc Paelinck, Martin King

=== Promotion ===
Alyona Lanskaya made several appearances across Europe to specifically promote "Solayoh" as the Belarusian Eurovision entry. In addition to her performance of "Solayoh" during the final of the Romanian Eurovision national final on 10 March, Lanskaya performed during the final of the Moldovan Eurovision national final on 16 March. On 28 April, she took part in promotional activities in Brussels, Belgium and performed during the Romanian Spring Festival, which was held at the Fish Market Square, as well as during the Le You Gay Tea Dance - You'rovision event, which was held at the Le You nightclub. On 11 May, Lanskaya performed during the Belarusian party of the EuroClub event, which was held at the Moriska Paviljongen in Malmö and hosted by Yuri Yaroshik.

== At Eurovision ==
Alyona Lanskaya presenting herself and "Solayoh" at the Eurovision Song Contest 2013

According to Eurovision rules, all nations with the exceptions of the host country and the "Big Five" (France, Germany, Italy, Spain and the United Kingdom) are required to qualify from one of two semi-finals in order to compete for the final; the top ten countries from each semi-final progress to the final. The European Broadcasting Union (EBU) split up the competing countries into six different pots based on voting patterns from previous contests, with countries with favourable voting histories put into the same pot. On 17 January 2013, a special allocation draw was held which placed each country into one of the two semi-finals, as well as which half of the show they would perform in. Belarus was placed into the first semi-final, to be held on 14 May 2013, and was scheduled to perform in the second half of the show.

Once all the competing songs for the 2013 contest had been released, the running order for the semi-finals was decided by the shows' producers rather than through another draw, so that similar songs were not placed next to each other. Belarus was set to perform in position 11, following the entry from Lithuania and before the entry from Moldova.

The two semi-finals and the final were broadcast in Belarus on Belarus 1 and Belarus 24 with commentary by Evgeny Perlin. The Belarusian spokesperson, who announce the top 12-point score awarded by the Belarusian jury during the final, was Darya Domracheva.

=== Semi-final ===
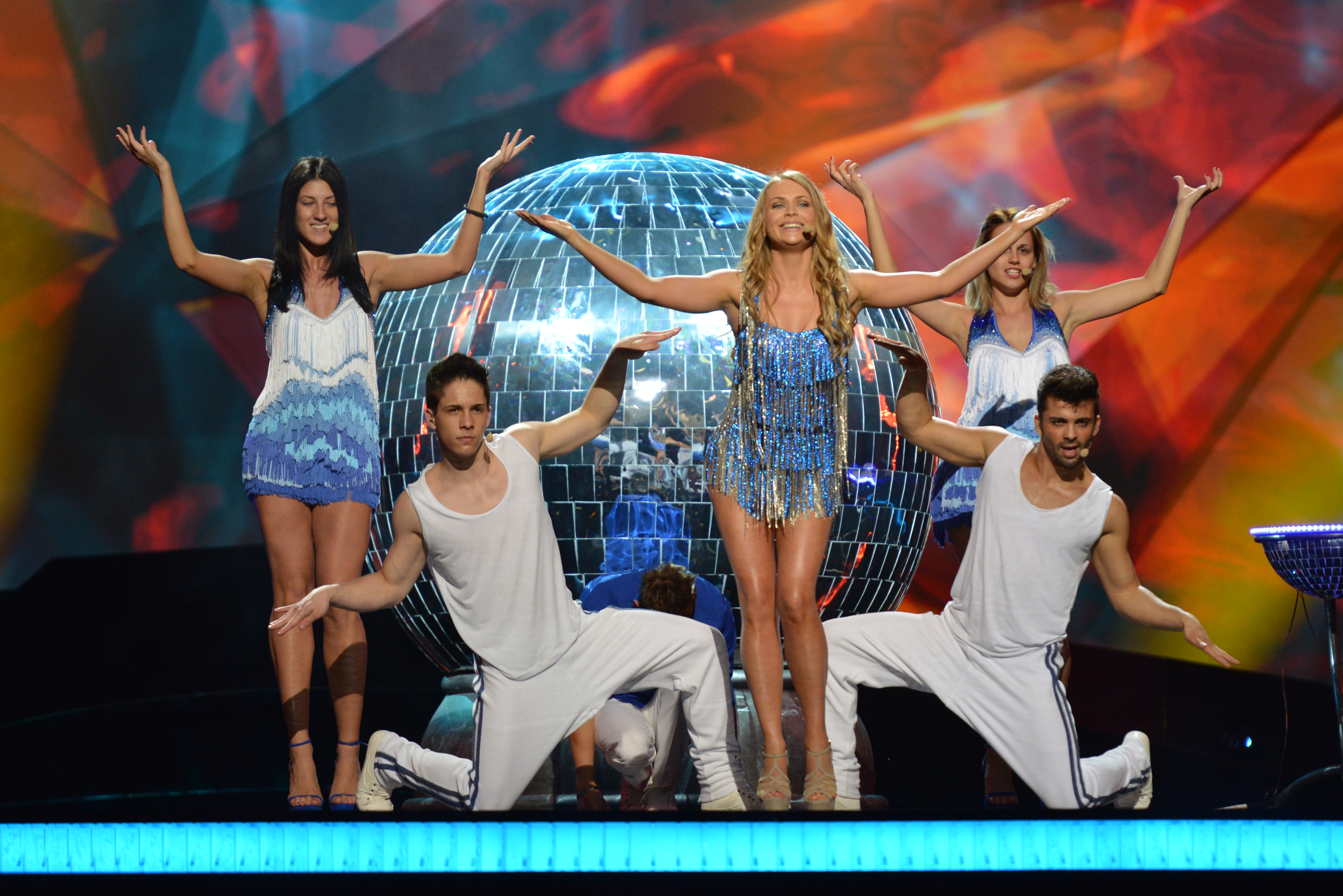
Alyona Lanskaya during a rehearsal before the first semi-final

Alyona Lanskaya took part in technical rehearsals on 7 and 10 May, followed by dress rehearsals on 13 and 14 May. This included the jury show on 13 May where the professional juries of each country watched and voted on the competing entries.

The Belarusian performance featured Alyona Lanskaya performing a choreographed routine on stage wearing a blue fringed dress covered in 70,000 Swarovski crystals together with two male dancers wearing white loose-fitting costumes and three backing vocalists wearing blue and white costumes. The performance began with Lanskaya appearing from within a big disco ball symbolising the planet of Solayoh, which was described by the singer as "a fantastic planet where people believe in miracles and take everything as a miracle." The stage displayed red and orange colours and drums were used by the dancers during the performance which also featured pyrotechnic effects. The dancers and backing vocalists that accompanied Lanskaya during the performance were: Žiga Sotlar, Mehmet Durmaz, Ana Mašulović, Marija Lazić and Willem Botha.

At the end of the show, Belarus was announced as having finished in the top 10 and subsequently qualifying for the grand final. It was later revealed that Belarus placed seventh in the semi-final, receiving a total of 64 points.

=== Final ===
Shortly after the first semi-final, a winners' press conference was held for the ten qualifying countries. As part of this press conference, the qualifying artists took part in a draw to determine which half of the grand final they would subsequently participate in. This draw was done in the reverse order the countries appeared in the semi-final running order. Belarus was drawn to compete in the first half. Following this draw, the shows' producers decided upon the running order of the final, as they had done for the semi-finals. Belarus was subsequently placed to perform in position 8, following the entry from Estonia and before the entry from Malta.

Alyona Lanskaya once again took part in dress rehearsals on 17 and 18 May before the final, including the jury final where the professional juries cast their final votes before the live show. Alyona Lanskaya performed a repeat of his semi-final performance during the final on 18 May. Belarus placed sixteenth in the final, scoring 48 points.

=== Voting ===
Voting during the three shows involved each country awarding points from 1-8, 10 and 12 as determined by a combination of 50% national jury and 50% televoting. Each nation's jury consisted of five music industry professionals who are citizens of the country they represent. This jury judged each entry based on: vocal capacity; the stage performance; the song's composition and originality; and the overall impression by the act. In addition, no member of a national jury was permitted to be related in any way to any of the competing acts in such a way that they cannot vote impartially and independently.

Below is a breakdown of points awarded to Belarus and awarded by Belarus in the first semi-final and grand final of the contest. The nation awarded its 12 points to Ukraine in the semi-final and final of the contest.

==== Points awarded to Belarus ====
Points awarded to Belarus (Semi-final 1)
Score	Country
12 points	Ukraine
10 points	Moldova
8 points	Lithuania
7 points	Italy
6 points	Cyprus; Montenegro
5 points	
4 points	Serbia; Slovenia
3 points	Ireland
2 points	Netherlands; Russia
1 point	

Points awarded to Belarus (Final)
Score	Country
12 points	Ukraine
10 points	
8 points	
7 points	Azerbaijan
6 points	
5 points	Armenia; Georgia; Macedonia
4 points	Moldova
3 points	Israel; Montenegro
2 points	Malta
1 point	Greece; Lithuania

==== Points awarded by Belarus ====
Points awarded by Belarus (Semi-final 1)
Score	Country
12 points	Ukraine
10 points	Russia
8 points	Denmark
7 points	Lithuania
6 points	Moldova
5 points	Estonia
4 points	Ireland
3 points	Belgium
2 points	Montenegro
1 point	Serbia

Points awarded by Belarus (Final)
Score	Country
12 points	Ukraine
10 points	Azerbaijan
8 points	Russia
7 points	Malta
6 points	Greece
5 points	Lithuania
4 points	Moldova
3 points	Norway
2 points	Armenia
1 point	Denmark
