= Azerbaijan in the Eurovision Song Contest 2013 =

- Eurovision Song Contest 2013
- Country: Azerbaijan
- Selection process: Milli Seçim Turu 2013
- Selection date: 14 March 2013

Competing entry
- Song: "Hold Me"
- Artist: Farid Mammadov
- Songwriters: Dimitris Kontopoulos; John Ballard; Ralph Charlie

Placement
- Semi-final result: Qualified (1st, 139 points)
- Final result: 2nd, 234 points

Participation chronology

Azerbaijan was represented at the Eurovision Song Contest 2013 with the song "Hold Me" written by Dimitris Kontopoulos, John Ballard and Ralph Charlie. The song was performed by Farid Mammadov. The Azerbaijani entry for the 2013 contest in Malmö, Sweden was selected through Milli Seçim Turu 2013, organised by the Azerbaijani broadcaster İctimai Television (İTV). Following eight semi-finals and a final on 14 March 2013, a six-member jury selected "Hold Me" performed by Farid Mammadov as the winner.

Azerbaijan was drawn to compete in the second semi-final of the Eurovision Song Contest which took place on 16 May 2013. Performing during the show in position 4, "Hold Me" was announced among the top 10 entries of the second semi-final and therefore qualified to compete in the final on 18 May. It was later revealed that Azerbaijan placed first out of the 17 participating countries in the semi-final with 139 points. In the final, Azerbaijan performed in position 20 and placed second out of the 26 participating countries, scoring 234 points.

== Background ==
Prior to the 2013 contest, Azerbaijan had participated in the Eurovision Song Contest five times since its first entry in 2008. Azerbaijan had won the contest on one occasion in 2011 with the song "Running Scared" performed by Ell and Nikki. Since their debut in 2008, Azerbaijan has had a string of successful results, qualifying to the final and placing in the top ten each year, including a third-place result in 2009 with the song "Always" performed by AySel and Arash. In 2012, Azerbaijan placed fourth with the song "When the Music Dies" performed by Sabina Babayeva.

The Azerbaijani national broadcaster, İctimai Television (İTV), broadcasts the event within Azerbaijan and organises the selection process for the nation's entry. İTV confirmed their intentions to participate at the 2013 Eurovision Song Contest on 21 September 2012. Azerbaijan had used various methods to select the Azerbaijani entry in the past, including internal selections as well as national finals to select both the artist and song. In 2011 and 2012, Azerbaijan organized a national final titled Milli Seçim Turu, which resulted in the selection of a winning performer that would subsequently be given an internally selected song to perform at Eurovision. The procedure was continued for the selection of their 2013 entry, however the 2013 edition of Milli Seçim Turu selected both the artist and song that represented Azerbaijan.

== Before Eurovision ==
=== Milli Seçim Turu 2013 ===
Milli Seçim Turu 2013 was the national final organised by İTV that selected the Azerbaijani entry for the Eurovision Song Contest 2013. The competition consisted of nine shows that commenced on 17 December 2012 and concluded with a winning artist and song on 14 March 2013. All shows were broadcast on İTV as well as streamed online via the broadcaster's website itv.az. The final was also streamed online at the official Eurovision Song Contest website eurovision.tv and broadcast in Turkey on TRT Müzik.

==== Format ====
The national final consisted of two stages. The first stage involved interested artists attending auditions after submitting applications between 15 and 25 October 2012. 70 artists selected from 128 applicants advanced to the second stage, the televised shows. Nine shows including eight semi-finals between 17 December 2012 and 8 March 2013 selected a total of ten artists that would advance to the final on 14 March 2013. In the final, the winner was selected from the remaining ten artists.

The results of the semi-finals were determined by the 50/50 combination of votes from public televoting and a six-member jury panel. Each semi-final took place across five days where the artists each performed cover versions of various songs in order to showcase their voice, dance ability and stage presence: world hits on Monday, Azerbaijani songs on Tuesday, Eurovision hits on Wednesday, songs with special focus on performance on Thursday and one of the songs performed during the previous four days on Friday when the results were also announced. For each of the eight shows, the public was able to cast their votes through telephone or SMS over the five days. In the final, the jury selected the Azerbaijani Eurovision entry after each of the finalists performed their candidate Eurovision song written by local and international songwriters.

The members of the jury were:

- Ismail Omarov – General Director of İTV
- Tunzale Agayeva – singer and composer
- Rashad Hashimov – composer
- Zulfiyya Khanbabayeva – singer
- Zahra Badalbayli – musician and poet
- Manzar Nuraliyeva – representative of the Ministry of Culture and Tourism of Azerbaijan

==== Semi-finals ====
The eight semi-finals took place between 17 December 2012 and 8 March 2013 at the İTV studios in Baku, hosted by Leyla Aliyeva and Konul Arifkizi. Uzeyir Guliyev only participated in the first four days of the eighth semi-final and therefore was disqualified from the competition. The remaining 69 artists each performed cover versions of various songs over five days and a total of ten artists were selected to advance to the final based on the results of a public televote and a jury.

Semi-final 1 – 17–21 December 2012
R/O	Artist	Place
1	New Skin	2
2	Jahangir Gasimzadeh	8
3	Madina Muradkhanova	3
4	Vugar Muradov	1
5	Anna Zemchenko	7
6	Nigar Alizadeh	6
7	Elgiz Mammadov	9
8	Rinat Alimov	5
9	Tomris Naibli	4

Semi-final 2 – 24–28 December 2012
R/O	Artist	Place
1	Shahin Sadigov	7
2	Sebel Jafarova	6
3	Baku Rock Group	5
4	Rafael Isayev	4
5	Khayal Taghiyev	9
6	Ena-Kamelia Tabesh Moghaddam	2
7	Anar Safarov	8
8	Ravana Aliyeva	1
9	Leyla Izzatova	3

Semi-final 3 – 7–11 January 2013
R/O	Artist	Place
1	Avantaj	6
2	Farah Hadiyeva	1
3	Mahram Gurbanzadeh	4
4	Oksana Rizayeva	7
5	Zaka Zeynalov	5
6	Elton Ibrahimov	2
7	Ulviyya Bakhishova	9
8	Adil Bakhishli	3
9	Vugar Aliyev	8

Semi-final 4 – 14–18 January 2013
R/O	Artist	Place
1	Sabina Shahmadova	3
2	Rovshan Azizov	7
3	Aghamehdi Mirzayev	8
4	Aydan Nuralizadeh	4
5	Elgun Huseynov	6
6	Boris Bayramov	5
7	Khana Hasanova	2
8	Leyla Aliyeva	1

Semi-final 5 – 28 January–1 February 2013
R/O	Artist	Place
1	Mustafa Mustafayev	7
2	Akif Aliyev	4
3	Rana Khalilova	5
4	Vusal Nasibov	9
5	Leyla Gafari	1
6	Elvin Babazadeh	3
7	Sevinj Thunold	2
8	Jalal Abbasov	6
9	Aftandil Mammadov	8

Semi-final 6 – 4–8 February 2013
R/O	Artist	Place
1	Farid Hasanov	4
2	Aygul Mammadova	7
3	Rustam Allazov	8
4	Narmina Seyidova	2
5	Davud Asgarli	5
6	Chinara Ismayilova	9
7	Farid Mammadov	1
8	Arzu Salimova	6
9	Mardan Kazimov	3

Semi-final 7 – 18–22 February 2013
R/O	Artist	Place
1	Nigar Huseynova	1
2	Rolan Seyidov	3
3	Ad Gloriam	8
4	Vlada Akhundova	1
5	Arzu Ismayilova	4
6	Huseyn Abdullayev	5
7	Aysel Narimanova	7
8	Husniyya Adigozalova	6

Semi-final 8 – 4–8 March 2013
R/O	Artist	Place
1	Elvin Babashov	7
2	Valeria Huseynzadeh	1
3	Seyran Ismayilkhanov	4
4	Aishabeyim Naghiyeva	8
5	Orkhan Kerimli	3
6	Aysel Babayeva	1
7	Uzeyir Guliyev	—
8	Leman Dadashova	5
9	Said Ismayilzadeh	6

==== Final ====
The final took place on 14 March 2013 at the Buta Palace in Baku, hosted by Leyla Aliyeva and Tural Asadov. The remaining ten artists each performed their candidate Eurovision song and "Hold Me" performed by Farid Mammadov was selected by the jury as the winner. In addition to the performances of the artists, the National Music Group, Tunzale Agayeva, Chingiz Mustafayev, Azerbaijani Eurovision Song Contest 2011 winner Eldar Gasimov and 2012 Azerbaijani Eurovision entrant Sabina Babayeva performed during the show as guests.

Final – 14 March 2013
R/O	Artist	Song
1	Leyla Gafari	"Pride"
2	Vugar Muradov	"Baby Baby"
3	Valeriya Huseynzadeh	"If This Is Love"
4	Leyla Aliyeva	"Welcome to the Sun"
5	Farah Hadiyeva	"We Are One"
6	Nigar Huseynova	"I Still Believe"
7	Vlada Akhundova	"Big Time"
8	Ravana Aliyeva	"Lovely King"
9	Farid Mammadov	"Hold Me"
10	Aysel Babayeva	"Sleazy Mo"

=== Promotion ===
Farid Mammadov made several appearances across Europe to specifically promote "Hold Me" as the Azerbaijani Eurovision entry. On 7 April, Mammadov took part in promotional activities in Greece where he appeared during the Alpha TV morning show programme Mes Tin Kali Hara and performed at a Eurovision party which was organised by oikotimes.com and held at the NOIZ Club in Athens. Between 14 and 15 April, Mammadov took part in promotional activities in Lithuania where he appeared and performed during the LRT programme Labas rytas, Lietuva and the TV3 show Chorų karai. Between 26 and 27 April, Mammadov appeared during the TVM talk show programmes Ħadd Għalik and Xarabank in Malta. On 29 April, Mammadov completed promotional activities in Georgia. In light of Turkey's refusal to participate in the Eurovision Song Contest 2013, Farid Mammadov released a Turkish version of "Hold Me" on 13 May, titled "Bana Dönsen", in order to dedicate the song to his fans from Turkey.

== At Eurovision ==
According to Eurovision rules, all nations with the exceptions of the host country and the "Big Five" (France, Germany, Italy, Spain and the United Kingdom) are required to qualify from one of two semi-finals in order to compete for the final; the top ten countries from each semi-final progress to the final. The European Broadcasting Union (EBU) split up the competing countries into six different pots based on voting patterns from previous contests, with countries with favourable voting histories put into the same pot. On 17 January 2013, a special allocation draw was held which placed each country into one of the two semi-finals, as well as which half of the show they would perform in. Azerbaijan was placed into the second semi-final, to be held on 16 May 2013, and was scheduled to perform in the first half of the show.

Once all the competing songs for the 2013 contest had been released, the running order for the semi-finals was decided by the shows' producers rather than through another draw, so that similar songs were not placed next to each other. Azerbaijan was set to perform in position 4, following the entry from Macedonia and before the entry from Finland.

The two semi-finals and final were broadcast in Azerbaijan on İTV with commentary by Konul Arifgizi. The Azerbaijani spokesperson, who announced the Azerbaijani votes during the final, was Tamilla Shirinova.

=== Semi-final ===
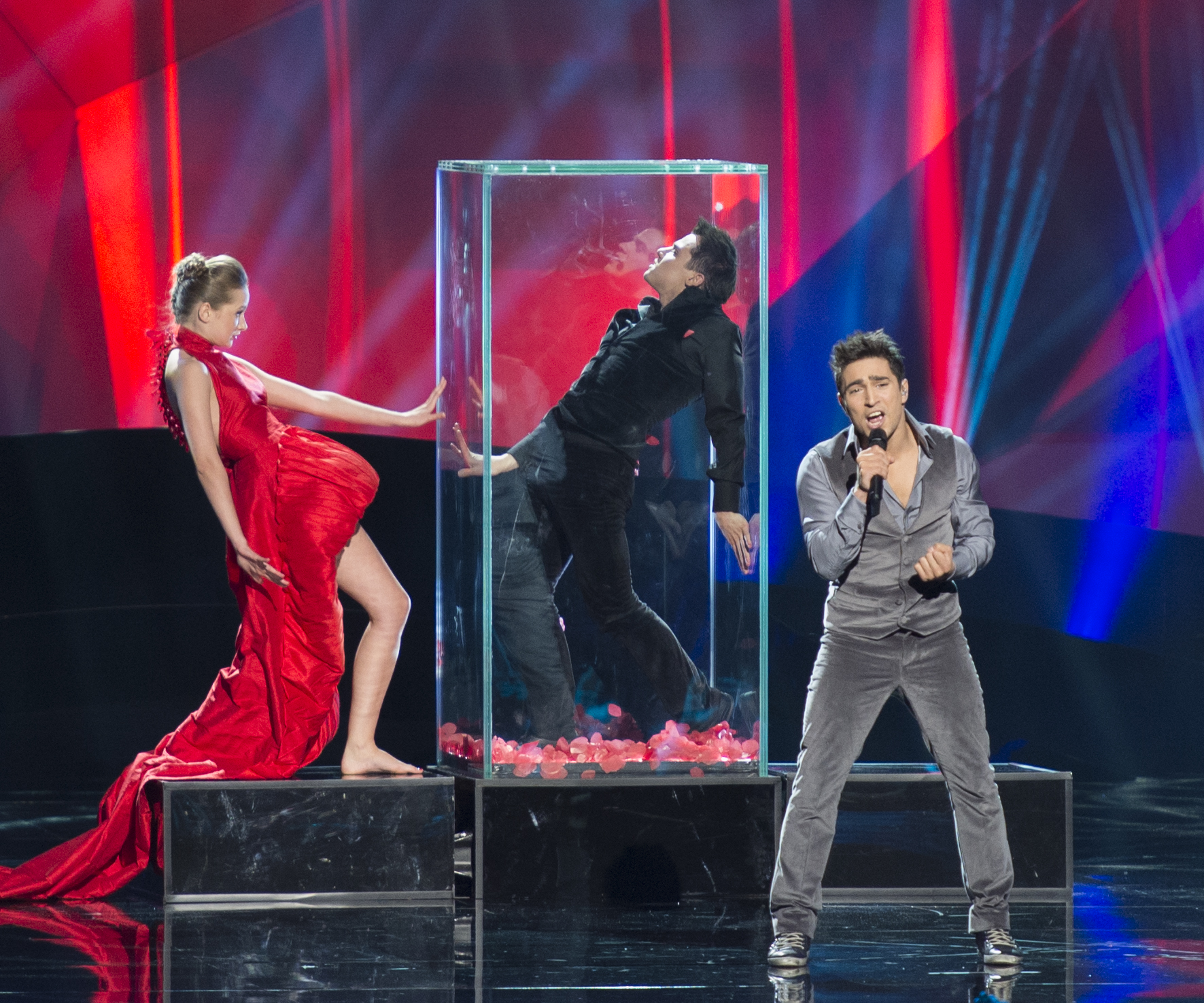
Farid Mammadov during a rehearsal before the second semi-final

Farid Mammadov took part in technical rehearsals on 8 and 11 May, followed by dress rehearsals on 15 and 16 May. This included the jury show on 15 May where the professional juries of each country watched and voted on the competing entries.

The Azerbaijani performance featured Farid Mammadov dressed in a grey shirt with grey vest and trousers performing with two dancers: one male dressed in black and one female in a red dress with a 20 meter-long train. The male dancer, which conveyed the idea of Mammadov's shadow, performed an acrobatic routine in a transparent glass box filled with pink petals that served as a podium for Mammadov in the first part of the song, while the female dancer, who appeared later, played the role of love. The stage colours were purple and pink, which symbolised the passion within the song and the performance. In regards to the performance, director Fokas Evangelinos stated: "The glass box symbolises the logic in our lives. But, inside logic there's a whole another world, full of passion, emotions, and love. When you're in love, sometimes you may find your life and soul upside down." The dancers that joined Farid Mammadov on stage were Alexander Kuzmenko and Iyrine Nevmyvanaya. An additional three off-stage backing vocalists were also part of the performance: Alvaro Estrella, Fernando Fuentes and Jennie Jahns.

At the end of the show, Azerbaijan was announced as having finished in the top 10 and subsequently qualifying for the grand final. It was later revealed that Azerbaijan placed first in the semi-final, receiving a total of 139 points.

=== Final ===
Shortly after the second semi-final, a winners' press conference was held for the ten qualifying countries. As part of this press conference, the qualifying artists took part in a draw to determine which half of the grand final they would subsequently participate in. This draw was done in the order the countries appeared in the semi-final running order. Azerbaijan was drawn to compete in the second half. Following this draw, the shows' producers decided upon the running order of the final, as they had done for the semi-finals. Azerbaijan was subsequently placed to perform in position 20, following the entry from Iceland and before the entry from Greece.

Farid Mammadov once again took part in dress rehearsals on 17 and 18 May before the final, including the jury final where the professional juries cast their final votes before the live show. Farid Mammadov performed a repeat of his semi-final performance during the final on 18 May. At the conclusion of the voting, Azerbaijan finished in second place with 234 points.

==== Marcel Bezençon Awards ====
The Marcel Bezençon Awards, first awarded during the 2002 contest, are awards honouring the best competing songs in the final each year. Named after the creator of the annual contest, Marcel Bezençon, the awards are divided into 3 categories: the Press Award, given to the best entry as voted on by the accredited media and press during the event; the Artistic Award, presented to the best artist as voted on by the shows' commentators; and the Composer Award, given to the best and most original composition as voted by the participating composers. Farid Mammadov was awarded the Artistic Award, which was accepted at the awards ceremony by Farid Mammadov.

=== Voting ===
Voting during the three shows consisted of 50 percent public televoting and 50 percent from a jury deliberation. The jury consisted of five music industry professionals who were citizens of the country they represent. This jury was asked to judge each contestant based on: vocal capacity; the stage performance; the song's composition and originality; and the overall impression by the act. In addition, no member of a national jury could be related in any way to any of the competing acts in such a way that they cannot vote impartially and independently.

Following the release of the full split voting by the EBU after the conclusion of the competition, it was revealed that Azerbaijan had placed third with the public televote and second with the jury vote in the final. In the public vote, Azerbaijan received an average rank of 5.86, while with the jury vote, Azerbaijan received an average rank of 7.77. In the second semi-final, Azerbaijan placed third with the public televote with an average rank of 5.28 and second with the jury vote with an average rank of 4.60.

Below is a breakdown of points awarded to Azerbaijan and awarded by Azerbaijan in the second semi-final and grand final of the contest. The nation awarded its 12 points to Malta in the semi-final and to Ukraine in the final of the contest.

==== Points awarded to Azerbaijan ====
Points awarded to Azerbaijan (Semi-final 2)
Score	Country
12 points	Bulgaria; Georgia; Greece; Hungary; Israel; Malta; Romania
10 points	
8 points	Albania; France; Iceland; Macedonia
7 points	Latvia
6 points	
5 points	Norway
4 points	
3 points	Finland; San Marino; Switzerland
2 points	Spain
1 point	

Points awarded to Azerbaijan (Final)
Score	Country
12 points	Austria; Bulgaria; Georgia; Greece; Hungary; Israel; Lithuania; Malta; Montenegro; Russia
10 points	Belarus; Romania; Ukraine
8 points	Cyprus; France; Moldova
7 points	Albania; Croatia; Iceland; Spain
6 points	Switzerland
5 points	Belgium; Serbia
4 points	Germany
3 points	Latvia; Slovenia
2 points	Ireland; Netherlands; San Marino
1 point	

==== Points awarded by Azerbaijan ====
Points awarded by Azerbaijan (Semi-final 2)
Score	Country
12 points	Malta
10 points	Georgia
8 points	Romania
7 points	Greece
6 points	Israel
5 points	Norway
4 points	Bulgaria
3 points	Finland
2 points	Albania
1 point	San Marino

Points awarded by Azerbaijan (Final)
Score	Country
12 points	Ukraine
10 points	Georgia
8 points	Malta
7 points	Belarus
6 points	Romania
5 points	Denmark
4 points	Greece
3 points	Lithuania
2 points	Norway
1 point	Moldova
