= Montenegro in the Eurovision Song Contest 2013 =

- Eurovision Song Contest 2013
- Participating broadcaster: Radio i televizija Crne Gore (RTCG)
- Country: Montenegro
- Selection process: Internal selection
- Announcement date: Artist: 20 December 2012; Song: 14 March 2013

Competing entry
- Song: "Igranka"
- Artist: Who See
- Songwriters: Đorđe Miljenović; Dejan Dedović; Mario Đorđević

Placement
- Semi-final result: Failed to qualify (12th)

Participation chronology

Montenegro was represented at the Eurovision Song Contest 2013 with the song "Igranka", written by Đorđe Miljenović, Dejan Dedović, and Mario Đorđević, and performed by the duo Who See. The Montenegrin participating broadcaster, Radio i televizija Crne Gore (RTCG), internally selected its entry for the contest. Who See was announced as the Montenegrin representative on 20 December 2012, while their song, "Igranka", was presented to the public in a television special titled Who See Igranka on 14 March 2013.

Montenegro was drawn to compete in the first semi-final of the Eurovision Song Contest which took place on 14 May 2013. Performing during the show in position 9, "Igranka" was not announced among the top 10 entries of the first semi-final and therefore did not qualify to compete in the final. It was later revealed that Montenegro placed twelfth out of the 16 participating countries in the semi-final with 41 points.

== Background ==
Prior to the 2013 contest, Radio i televizija Crne Gore (RTCG) has participated in the Eurovision Song Contest representing Montenegro as an independent country four times since its first entry in 2007. To this point, Montenegro has yet to feature in a final. RTCG briefly withdrew from the competition between 2010 and 2011 citing financial difficulties as the reason for their absence. In 2012, they returned to the competition but again failed to qualify with the song "Euro Neuro" performed by Rambo Amadeus.

As part of its duties as participating broadcaster, RTCG organises the selection of its entry in the Eurovision Song Contest and broadcasts the event in the country. The broadcaster confirmed that it would participate at the 2013 contest on 14 December 2012. RTCG has used various methods to select its entry in the past, such as internal selections and televised national finals to choose the performer, song or both to compete at Eurovision. Since 2009, the broadcaster has opted to internally select both the artist and song, a procedure that continued for the selection of the 2013 entry.

== Before Eurovision ==
=== Internal selection ===
On 20 December 2012, RTCG announced that the duo Who See would represent Montenegro in Malmö. On 1 February 2012, it was announced that Nina Žižić would join the duo as an additional vocalist. Žižić previously attempted to represent Serbia and Montenegro in 2006 where she placed seventeenth in the Montenegrin semi-final of the national selection with the song "Potraži me". The Montenegrin song, "Igranka", was presented during a television special titled Who See Igranka on 14 March 2013, which was held in Podgorica and hosted by Sabrija Vulić. The show was televised on TVCG 1 and TVCG SAT as well as broadcast online via the broadcaster's website rtcg.me and the official Eurovision Song Contest website eurovision.tv. "Igranka" was written by Đorđe Miljenović (Wikluh Sky) and Who See's members Dejan Dedović and Mario Đorđević, while production and mixing was carried out by Wikluh Sky. The Montenegrin representatives recorded the music video for the song in February 2013, which was filmed at an abandoned factory in Podgorica and directed by Zoran Marković Zonjo.

== At Eurovision ==
According to Eurovision rules, all nations with the exceptions of the host country and the "Big Five" (France, Germany, Italy, Spain and the United Kingdom) are required to qualify from one of two semi-finals in order to compete for the final; the top ten countries from each semi-final progress to the final. The European Broadcasting Union (EBU) split up the competing countries into six different pots based on voting patterns from previous contests, with countries with favourable voting histories put into the same pot. On 17 January 2013, a special allocation draw was held which placed each country into one of the two semi-finals, as well as which half of the show they would perform in. Montenegro was placed into the first semi-final, to be held on 14 May 2013, and was scheduled to perform in the second half of the show.

Once all the competing songs for the 2013 contest had been released, the running order for the semi-finals was decided by the shows' producers rather than through another draw, so that similar songs were not placed next to each other. Montenegro was set to perform in position 9, following the entry from the Netherlands and before the entry from Lithuania.

The two semi-finals and the final were broadcast in Montenegro on TVCG 1 and TVCG SAT with commentary by Dražen Bauković and Tamara Ivanković. The three shows were also broadcast via radio on Radio Crne Gore and Radio 98 with commentary by Sonja Savović and Sanja Pejović. RTCG appointed Ivana Sebek as its spokesperson to announce the Montenegrin votes during the final.

=== Semi-final ===
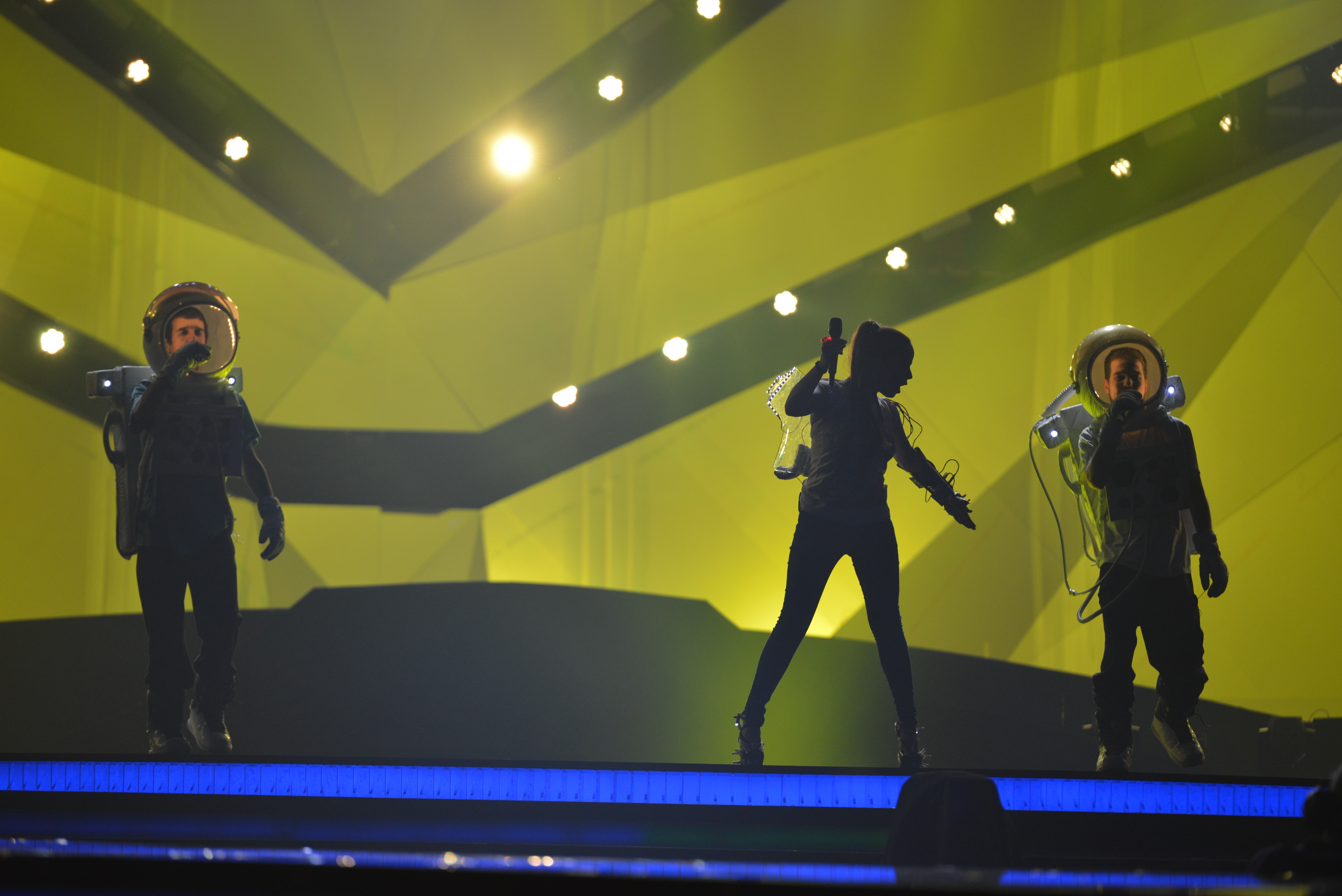
Who See during a rehearsal before the first semi-final

Who See took part in technical rehearsals on 7 and 10 May, followed by dress rehearsals on 13 and 14 May. This included the jury show on 13 May where the professional juries of each country watched and voted on the competing entries.

The Montenegrin performance featured the members of Who See on stage dressed as astronauts with Nina Žižić, who was lifted to the stage a second before the chorus, in an outfit with cyborg elements created by designer Ana Zarubica. In regards to Who See's astronaut costumes, stage director for the performance Zoran Marković Zonjo stated: "We all dream about being astronauts when we are kids. In this case we wanted to have a party in the space." The performance also featured the use of smoke effects with the LED screens displaying green and yellow lights and laser beams.

At the end of the show, Montenegro was not announced among the top 10 entries in the first semi-final and therefore failed to qualify to compete in the final. It was later revealed that Montenegro placed twelfth in the semi-final, receiving a total of 41 points.

=== Voting ===
Voting during the three shows consisted of 50 percent public televoting and 50 percent from a jury deliberation. Each participating broadcaster assembled a jury panel of five music industry professionals who were citizens of the country they represented. This jury was asked to judge each contestant based on: vocal capacity; the stage performance; the song's composition and originality; and the overall impression by the act. In addition, no member of a national jury could be related in any way to any of the competing acts in such a way that they cannot vote impartially and independently.

Following the release of the full split voting by the EBU after the conclusion of the competition, it was revealed that Montenegro had placed fourth with the public televote and fourteenth with the jury vote in the first semi-final. In the public vote, Montenegro received an average rank of 7.33, while with the jury vote, Montenegro received an average rank of 10.16.

Below is a breakdown of points awarded to Montenegro and awarded by Montenegro in the first semi-final and grand final of the contest. The nation awarded its 12 points to Ukraine in the semi-final and to Azerbaijan in the final of the contest.

==== Points awarded to Montenegro ====
Points awarded to Montenegro (Semi-final 1)
Score	Country
12 points	Serbia
10 points	
8 points	Ukraine
7 points	
6 points	Croatia; Moldova
5 points	Denmark
4 points	
3 points	
2 points	Belarus; Sweden
1 point	

==== Points awarded by Montenegro ====
Points awarded by Montenegro (Semi-final 1)
Score	Country
12 points	Ukraine
10 points	Serbia
8 points	Denmark
7 points	Russia
6 points	Belarus
5 points	Croatia
4 points	Moldova
3 points	Slovenia
2 points	Netherlands
1 point	Belgium

Points awarded by Montenegro (Final)
Score	Country
12 points	Azerbaijan
10 points	Denmark
8 points	Greece
7 points	Russia
6 points	Italy
5 points	Moldova
4 points	Norway
3 points	Belarus
2 points	Georgia
1 point	Romania
