= Nuteki =

Russian-Belarusian band

NUTEKI
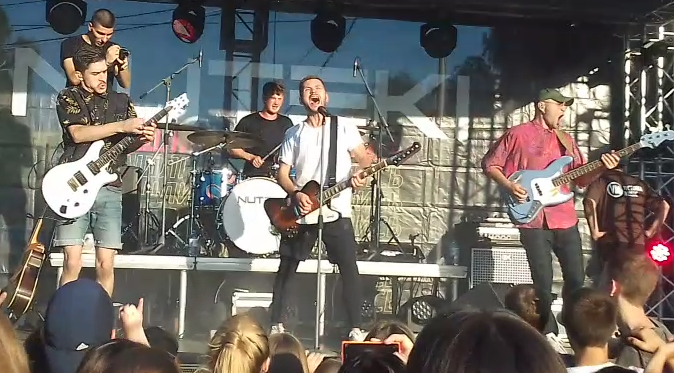
- Nuteki at a concert in Orenburg

Background information
- Origin: Moscow, Russia / Bobruisk, Belarus
- Genres: Rock, alternative rock, nu metal, alternative metal
- Years active: 2007–present
- Labels: Independent
- Members: Mikhail Nokarashvili (lead vocals); Dmitriy Bezborody (bass guitar); Alexandr Naumov (guitar); Andrey Ivanov (drums)
- Past members: Alexander Gerasimov; Igor Narbekov; Karina Nokarashvili; Sergey Shubin; Kirill Matushenko
- Website: http://nuteki.ru

NUTEKI is a Russian-Belarusian alternative metal band, which was formed in 2007. The band was founded by Mikhail Nokarashvili (lead vocals) and Kirill Matsiushenko (keyboards and programming), both of whom are originally from Bobruisk, Belarus. NUTEKI are mostly recognized by their distinctive appearance and view towards live performances: "Shows must be performed in such a way that the people would still be interested to see them even with no audio".

Over the span of their career, NUTEKI took part in the Belarusian national contest to represent the country on Eurovision three times. They became semifinalists in 2011; won the second place in 2013, came in fifth in 2014. and got second in 2017, behind NAVI

== History ==
=== Early years (2007-2009) ===
In February 2008, NUTEKI self-released their debut single "Glass of My Soul", which later became the band's most popular release to date. After this release, the band participated in the "Destined to Be Number One" music contest held in Moscow and managed to take the first place. This achievement was incredibly important in the history of the band, seeing as all the members' ages ranged from 16 to 18 years during that period. Following the success, the band headlined the 45-date "Summer Music Festival" during the Summer of the same year.

=== Digital Dreams, Unplugged #1 (2010-2013) ===
On August 1, 2010, the band's debut album "Digital Dreams" was released.

In the beginning of 2011's Summer, the band started recording the music video for "The Clowns", which is released in June 2012. The year of 2011 was a very active period for the group, during which they had numerous concerts, including "The Big Clowns Show" tour across Ukraine.

In February 2012 NUTEKI releases their first acoustic album called "Unplugged #1".

=== THE BGNNG (2014-present) ===
NUTEKI self-released their EP "THE BGNNG" in October 2014, which consists of the first chapter of their upcoming second album and a music video for their song "Wind Inside".

== Discography ==
=== Studio albums ===
- Digital Dreams (2010)
- Unplugged#1 (2012)
- NUTEKI (2014–2015)

=== EPs ===
- "Ты+Я" (You+Me) (2009)
- THE BGNNG (2014)
- "Дни-километры" (Days-Kilometers) (2015)

=== Singles ===
- "Glass of My Soul" (Стекло моей души) (2008)
- "The Clowns" (2012)
- "Save Me" (2012)
- "Please Don't Stop" (2013)
- "Fly Away" (2013)

== Music videos ==
1. 2009 — «Стекло души» (Glass of My Soul)
2. 2010 — «Ты+Я» (You+Me)
3. 2012 — «Не молчи» (Don't be Silent)
4. 2012 — «Клоуны» (The Clowns)
5. 2012 — «Save Me»
6. 2012 — «Stars»
7. 2012 — «The Clowns»
8. 2013 — «Если/Но» (Please Don't Stop in Russian)
9. 2013 — «Please Don't Stop»
10. 2013 — «Дыши со мной» (Fly Away in Russian)
11. 2014 — «Fly Away»
12. 2014 — «Wind Inside»
13. 2015 — «Дни километры»
14. 2015 — «Больше чем ты»
15. 2015 - «Песня счастливых»
16. 2016 - «Take My Heart»
17. 2016 - ≈lokimj swkjw≈

=== Live records ===
NUTEKI - LIVE IN MINSK DVD (2012)
