= Ireland in the Eurovision Song Contest 2013 =

- Eurovision Song Contest 2013
- Participating broadcaster: Raidió Teilifís Éireann (RTÉ)
- Country: Ireland
- Selection process: Eurosong 2013
- Selection date: 22 February 2013

Competing entry
- Song: "Only Love Survives"
- Artist: Ryan Dolan
- Songwriters: Wez Devine; Ryan Dolan

Placement
- Semi-final result: Qualified (8th, 54 points)
- Final result: 26th, 5 points

Participation chronology

Ireland was represented at the Eurovision Song Contest 2013 with the song "Only Love Survives", written by Wez Devine and Ryan Dolan, and performed by Ryan Dolan. The Irish participating broadcaster, Raidió Teilifís Éireann (RTÉ), organised the national final Eurosong 2013 in order to select its entry for the contest. Five songs faced the votes of five regional juries and a public televote, ultimately resulting in the selection of "Only Love Survives" performed by Ryan Dolan as the Irish Eurovision entry.

Ireland was drawn to compete in the first semi-final of the Eurovision Song Contest which took place on 14 May 2013. Performing during the show in position 13, "Only Love Survives" was announced among the top 10 entries of the first semi-final and therefore qualified to compete in the final on 18 May. It was later revealed that Ireland placed eighth out of the 16 participating countries in the semi-final with 54 points. In the final, Ireland performed as the closing entry during the show in position 26 and placed twenty-sixth (last) out of the 26 participating countries, scoring 5 points.

== Background ==
Prior to the 2013 contest, Raidió Teilifís Éireann (RTÉ) and its predecessor national broadcasters have participated in the Eurovision Song Contest representing Ireland forty-six times since RÉ's first entry in 1965. They have won the contest a record seven times in total. Their first win came in 1970, with "All Kinds of Everything" performed by Dana. Ireland holds the record for being the only country to win the contest three times in a row (in 1992, 1993, and 1994), as well as having the only three-time winner (Johnny Logan, who won in 1980 as a singer, 1987 as a singer-songwriter, and again in 1992 as a songwriter). 2011 and 2012, Jedward represented the country for two consecutive years, managing to qualify to the final both times and achieve Ireland's highest position in the contest since 2000, placing eighth in 2011 with the song "Lipstick"; and placing nineteenth in 2012 with the song "Waterline".

As part of its duties as participating broadcaster, RTÉ organises the selection of its entry in the Eurovision Song Contest and broadcasts the event in the country. The broadcaster confirmed its intentions to participate at the 2013 contest on 29 May 2012. From 2008 to 2012, RTÉ had set up the national final Eurosong to choose both the song and performer to compete at Eurovision for Ireland, with both the public and regional jury groups involved in the selection. For the 2013 contest, RTÉ announced on 22 October 2012 the organisation of Eurosong 2013 to choose the artist and song.

== Before Eurovision ==
=== Eurosong 2013 ===
Eurosong 2013 was the national final format developed by RTÉ in order to select its entry for the Eurovision Song Contest 2013. The competition was held on 22 February 2013 at the Studio 4 of RTÉ in Dublin, hosted by Ryan Tubridy and broadcast on RTÉ One during a special edition of The Late Late Show. The show was also broadcast online via RTÉ's official website rte.ie and the official Eurovision Song Contest website eurovision.tv.

==== Competing entries ====
On 6 November 2012, RTÉ revealed the five music industry professionals that were invited to each select and mentor an entry for the competition: presenter Mairead Farrell, radio DJ and producer Mark McCabe, songwriter Niall Mooney, writer and performer Shay Healy, and producer Stuart O'Connor. The five finalists were announced on 6 February 2013, while their songs were presented on 7 February 2013 during The Derek Mooney Show on RTÉ Radio 1.

| Artist | Song | Songwriter(s) | Mentor |
|---|---|---|---|
| Aimée Fitzpatrick | "Crashing Down" | Robert Grace | Mark McCabe |
| Inchequin | "Son Kez/The Last Time" | Hugh O'Neill, Sinead Bradley | Shay Healy |
| Kasey | "Kiss Me" | Drax | Mairead Farrell |
| Ryan Dolan | "Only Love Survives" | Wez Devine, Ryan Dolan | Stuart O'Connor |
| Zoe Alexis Bohorquez | "Fire" | Lauren White Murphy, Niall Mooney, Willie Weeks | Niall Mooney |

==== Final ====
The national final took place on 22 February 2013 and featured a guest performance from former contest winner Lordi as well as commentary from a panel that consisted of commentator Marty Whelan, producer Bill Hughes and presenter Evelyn O'Rourke. Two former contestants also made appearances in the performances of the competing entries: former contest winner Charlie McGettigan was a pianist for Aimée Fitzpatrick, while Donna McCaul who represented Ireland in 2005 was a backing vocalist for Zoe Alexis Bohorquez. Following the 50/50 combination of votes from five regional juries and public televoting, "Only Love Survives" performed by Ryan Dolan was selected as the winner.

Final – 22 February 2013
| R/O | Artist | Song | Jury | Televote | Total | Place |
|---|---|---|---|---|---|---|
| 1 | Inchequin | "Son Kez/The Last Time" | 34 | 20 | 54 | 4 |
| 2 | Aimée Fitzpatrick | "Crashing Down" | 54 | 50 | 104 | 2 |
| 3 | Zoe Alexis Bohorquez | "Fire" | 24 | 30 | 54 | 4 |
| 4 | Ryan Dolan | "Only Love Survives" | 52 | 60 | 112 | 1 |
| 5 | Kasey | "Kiss Me" | 36 | 40 | 76 | 3 |

Detailed Regional Jury Votes
| R/O | Song | Cork | Limerick | Galway | Dundalk | Dublin | Total |
|---|---|---|---|---|---|---|---|
| 1 | "Son Kez/The Last Time" | 8 | 6 | 6 | 10 | 4 | 34 |
| 2 | "Crashing Down" | 12 | 10 | 12 | 12 | 8 | 54 |
| 3 | "Fire" | 6 | 4 | 4 | 4 | 6 | 24 |
| 4 | "Only Love Survives" | 10 | 12 | 10 | 8 | 12 | 52 |
| 5 | "Kiss Me" | 4 | 8 | 8 | 6 | 10 | 36 |

=== Promotion ===
Ryan Dolan made several appearances across Europe to specifically promote "Only Love Survives" as the Irish Eurovision entry. On 13 April, Ryan Dolan performed during the Eurovision in Concert event which was held at the Melkweg venue in Amsterdam, Netherlands and hosted by Marlayne and Linda Wagenmakers. On 28 April, Dolan took part in promotional activities in Moscow, Russia where he appeared on MTV Russia and performed at the Central Station venue as well as during the Eurovision Russian Party which was held at the Kapitoliy shopping mall. In addition to his international appearances, Ryan Dolan also completed promotional appearances in Ireland by performing on The Late Late Show on 3 May.

== At Eurovision ==
Dolan presenting himself and "Only Love Survives" at the Eurovision Song Contest 2013

According to Eurovision rules, all nations with the exceptions of the host country and the "Big Five" (France, Germany, Italy, Spain and the United Kingdom) are required to qualify from one of two semi-finals in order to compete for the final; the top ten countries from each semi-final progress to the final. The European Broadcasting Union (EBU) split up the competing countries into six different pots based on voting patterns from previous contests, with countries with favourable voting histories put into the same pot. On 17 January 2013, a special allocation draw was held which placed each country into one of the two semi-finals, as well as which half of the show they would perform in. Ireland was placed into the first semi-final, to be held on 14 May 2013, and was scheduled to perform in the second half of the show.

Once all the competing songs for the 2013 contest had been released, the running order for the semi-finals was decided by the shows' producers rather than through another draw, so that similar songs were not placed next to each other. Ireland was set to perform in position 13, following the entry from Moldova and before the entry from Cyprus.

In Ireland, the two semi-finals were broadcast on RTÉ2 and the final was broadcast on RTÉ One with all three shows featuring commentary by Marty Whelan. The first semi-final and the final were also broadcast via radio on RTÉ Radio 1 with commentary by Shay Byrne and Zbyszek Zalinski. The Irish spokesperson, who announced the top 12-point score awarded by the Irish jury during the final, was Nicky Byrne.

=== Semi-final ===
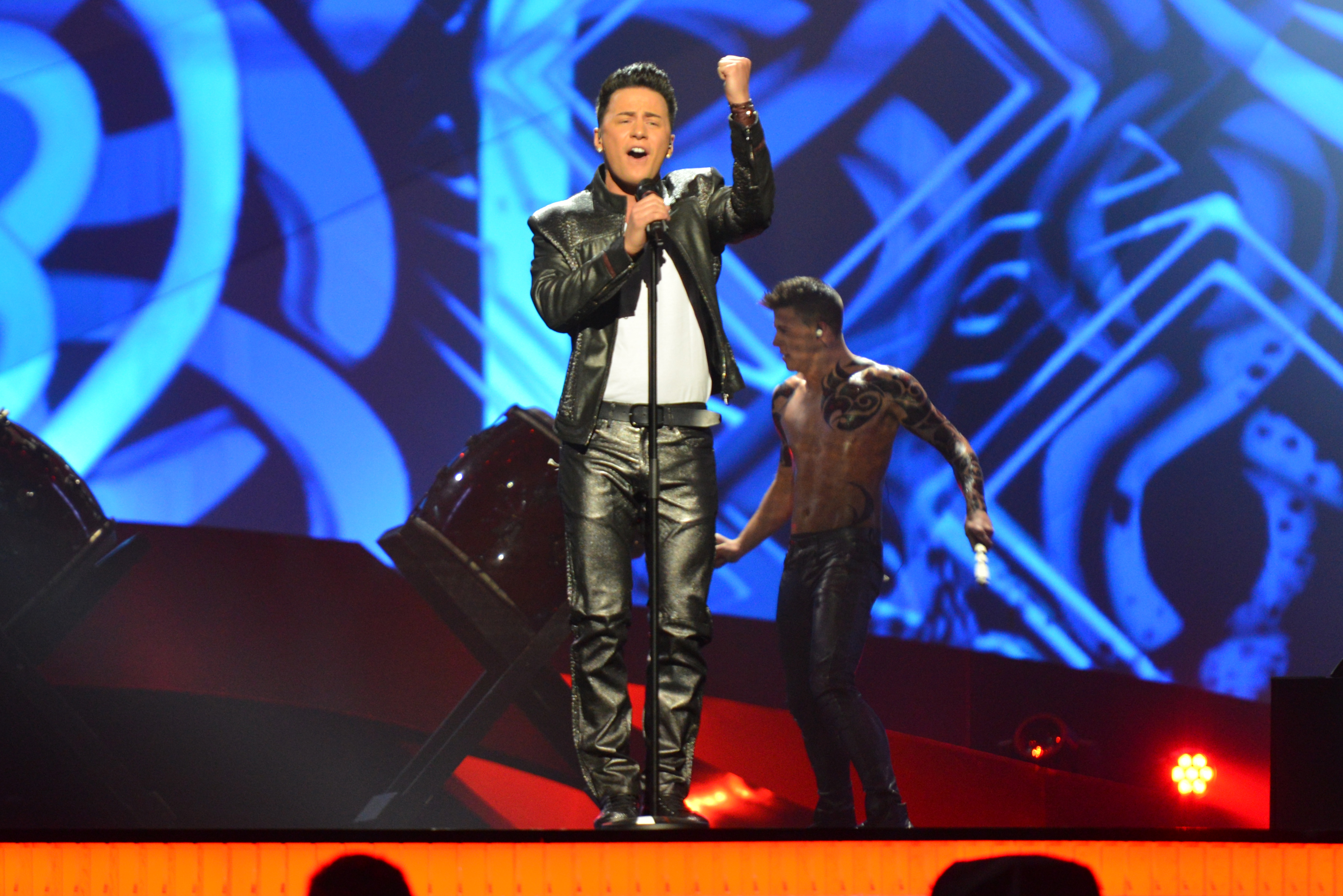
Ryan Dolan during a rehearsal before the second semi-final

Ryan Dolan took part in technical rehearsals on 7 and 10 May, followed by dress rehearsals on 13 and 14 May. This included the jury show on 13 May where the professional juries of each country watched and voted on the competing entries.

The Irish performance featured Ryan Dolan performing together with two backing dancers adorned with tribal bodypaint who also played bodhrán drums: Alan McGrath and Colm Farrell, and a main drummer who used three larger mounted drums: Nick Bailey. The LED screens displayed heart-shaped tribal and Celtic imagery initially in red before later transitioning to blue. Dolan was joined on stage by two backing vocalists: Leanne Moore and Alison Vard Miller.

At the end of the show, Ireland was announced as having finished in the top 10 and consequently qualifying for the grand final. It was later revealed that Ireland placed eighth in the semi-final, receiving a total of 54 points.

=== Final ===
Shortly after the first semi-final, a winners' press conference was held for the ten qualifying countries. As part of this press conference, the qualifying artists took part in a draw to determine which half of the grand final they would subsequently participate in. This draw was done in the order the countries appeared in the semi-final running order. Ireland was drawn to compete in the second half. Following this draw, the shows' producers decided upon the running order of the final, as they had done for the semi-finals. Ireland was subsequently placed to perform last in position 26, following the entry from Georgia.

Ryan Dolan once again took part in dress rehearsals on 17 and 18 May before the final, including the jury final where the professional juries cast their final votes before the live show. Ryan Dolan performed a repeat of his semi-final performance during the final on 18 May. Ireland placed twenty-sixth (last) in the final, scoring 5 points. It was the second time after 2007 that the nation finished last in the contest.

=== Voting ===
Voting during the three shows consisted of 50 percent public televoting and 50 percent from a jury deliberation. The jury consisted of five music industry professionals who were citizens of the country they represent. This jury was asked to judge each contestant based on: vocal capacity; the stage performance; the song's composition and originality; and the overall impression by the act. In addition, no member of a national jury could be related in any way to any of the competing acts in such a way that they cannot vote impartially and independently.

Following the release of the full split voting by the EBU after the conclusion of the competition, it was revealed that Ireland had placed sixth with the public televote and tenth with the jury vote in the first semi-final. In the public vote, Ireland received an average rank of 7.61, while with the jury vote, Ireland received an average rank of 9.26. In the final, Ireland had placed fourteenth with the public televote and twenty-third with the jury vote. In the public vote, Ireland received an average rank of 14.62, while with the jury vote, Ireland received an average rank of 16.21.

Below is a breakdown of points awarded to Ireland and awarded by Ireland in the first semi-final and grand final of the contest, and the breakdown of the jury voting and televoting conducted during the two shows:

==== Points awarded to Ireland ====
Points awarded to Ireland (Semi-final 1)
| Score | Country |
|---|---|
| 12 points | |
| 10 points | |
| 8 points | |
| 7 points | Cyprus |
| 6 points | Russia; United Kingdom |
| 5 points | Estonia; Lithuania; Netherlands |
| 4 points | Belarus; Belgium |
| 3 points | Denmark; Sweden; Ukraine |
| 2 points | Croatia |
| 1 point | Moldova |

Points awarded to Ireland (Final)
| Score | Country |
|---|---|
| 12 points | |
| 10 points | |
| 8 points | |
| 7 points | |
| 6 points | |
| 5 points | |
| 4 points | |
| 3 points | |
| 2 points | Cyprus; Sweden |
| 1 point | United Kingdom |

==== Points awarded by Ireland ====
Points awarded by Ireland (Semi-final 1)
| Score | Country |
|---|---|
| 12 points | Denmark |
| 10 points | Russia |
| 8 points | Estonia |
| 7 points | Belgium |
| 6 points | Lithuania |
| 5 points | Netherlands |
| 4 points | Austria |
| 3 points | Belarus |
| 2 points | Ukraine |
| 1 point | Croatia |

Points awarded by Ireland (Final)
| Score | Country |
|---|---|
| 12 points | Denmark |
| 10 points | Russia |
| 8 points | Ukraine |
| 7 points | United Kingdom |
| 6 points | Netherlands |
| 5 points | Sweden |
| 4 points | Belgium |
| 3 points | Moldova |
| 2 points | Azerbaijan |
| 1 point | Lithuania |
