= Sweden in the Eurovision Song Contest 2013 =

- Eurovision Song Contest 2013
- Participating broadcaster: Sveriges Television (SVT)
- Country: Sweden
- Selection process: Melodifestivalen 2013
- Selection date: 9 March 2013

Competing entry
- Song: "You"
- Artist: Robin Stjernberg
- Songwriters: Robin Stjernberg; Linnea Deb; Joy Deb; Joakim Harestad Haukaas

Placement
- Final result: 14th, 62 points

Participation chronology

Sweden was represented at the Eurovision Song Contest 2013 with the song "You", written by Robin Stjernberg, Linnea Deb, Joy Deb, and Joakim Harestad Haukaas, and performed by Stjernberg himself. The Swedish participating broadcaster, Sveriges Television (SVT), selected its entry through Melodifestivalen 2013. In addition, SVT was also the host broadcaster and staged the event at the Malmö Arena in Malmö, after winning the previous edition with the song "Euphoria" performed by Loreen.

After a six-week-long competition consisting of four heats, a Second Chance round and a final, "You" performed by Robin Stjernberg emerged as the winner of the Melodifestivalen 2013 after achieving the highest score following the combination of votes from eleven international jury groups and a public vote.

As the host country, Sweden qualified to compete directly in the final of the Eurovision Song Contest. Sweden's running order position was determined by draw. Performing in position 16 during the final, Sweden placed fourteenth out of the 26 participating countries with 62 points.

== Background ==
Prior to the 2013 contest, Sveriges Radio (SR) until 1979, and Sveriges Television (SVT) since 1980, had participated in the Eurovision Song Contest representing Sweden fifty-two times since SR's first entry in 1958. They had won the contest on five occasions: in 1974 with the song "Waterloo" performed by ABBA, in 1984 with the song "Diggi-Loo Diggi-Ley" performed by Herreys, in 1991 with the song "Fångad av en stormvind" performed by Carola, in 1999 with the song "Take Me to Your Heaven" performed by Charlotte Nilsson, and in 2012 with the song "Euphoria" performed by Loreen. Following the introduction of semi-finals for the 2004, the Swedish entries, to this point, have featured in every final except for 2010 when the nation failed to qualify.

As part of its duties as participating broadcaster, SVT organises the selection of its entry in the Eurovision Song Contest and broadcasts the event in the country. Since 1959, SR first and SVT later have organised the annual competition Melodifestivalen in order to select their entries for the contest.

== Before Eurovision ==
=== Melodifestivalen 2013 ===
Melodifestivalen 2013 was the Swedish music competition that selected their entry for the Eurovision Song Contest 2013. 32 competed in a six-week-long process which consisted of four heats on 2, 9, 16 and 23 February 2013, a second chance round on 2 March 2013, and a final on 9 March 2013. The six shows were hosted by Gina Dirawi and Danny Saucedo. Eight songs competed in each heat—the top two qualified directly to the final, while the third and fourth placed songs qualified to the second chance round. The bottom four songs in each heat were eliminated from the competition. An additional two songs qualified to the final from the second chance round. The results in the semi-finals and second chance round were determined exclusively by public televoting, while the overall winner of the competition was selected in the final through the combination of a public vote and the votes from eleven international jury groups. Among the competing artists was former Eurovision Song Contest contestant Tommy Körberg (participating as a member of Ravaillacz) who represented Sweden in 1969 and 1988.

==== Heats and Second Chance round ====
- The first heat took place on 2 February 2013 at the Telenor Arena in Karlskrona. "Heartbreak Hotel" performed by Yohio and "Skyline" performed by David Lindgren qualified directly to the final, while "Burning Flags" performed by Cookies 'N' Beans and "Vi kommer aldrig att förlora" performed by Eric Gadd qualified to the Second Chance round. "Paris" performed by Jay-Jay Johanson, "Gosa" performed by Mary N'diaye, "Porslin" performed by Anna Järvinen, and "We're Still Kids" performed by Michael Feiner and Caisa were eliminated.
- The second heat took place on 9 February 2013 at the Scandinavium in Gothenburg. "Copacabanana" performed by Sean Banan and "Only the Dead Fish Follow the Stream" performed by Louise Hoffsten qualified directly to the final, while "Begging" performed by Anton Ewald and "Hello Goodbye" performed by Erik Segerstedt and Tone Damli qualified to the Second Chance round. "Make Me No 1" performed by Felicia Olsson, "Annelie" performed by Joacim Cans, "On Top of the World" performed by Swedish House Wives, and "En förlorad sommar" performed by Rikard Wolff feat. Sara Isaksson were eliminated.
- The third heat took place on 16 February 2013 at the Skellefteå Kraft Arena in Skellefteå. "En riktig jävla schlager" performed by Ravaillacz and "Falling" performed by State of Drama qualified directly to the final, while "In and Out of Love" performed by Martin Rolinski and "Hon har inte" performed by Caroline af Ugglas qualified to the Second Chance round. "Alibi" performed by Eddie Razaz, "Island" performed by Elin Petersson, "Dumb" performed by Amanda Fondell, and "Heartstrings" performed by Janet Leon were eliminated.
- The fourth heat took place on 23 February 2013 at the Malmö Arena in Malmö. "Tell the World I'm Here" performed by Ulrik Munther and "Bed on Fire" performed by Ralf Gyllenhammar qualified directly to the final, while "You" performed by Robin Stjernberg and "Jalla Dansa Sawa" performed by Behrang Miri feat. Loulou Lamotte and Oscar Zia qualified to the Second Chance round. "Rockin' the Ride" performed by Army of Lovers, "Must Be Love" performed by Lucia Piñera, "Trivialitet" performed by Sylvia Vrethammar, and "Breaking the Silence" performed by Terese Fredenwall were eliminated.
- The Second Chance round (Andra chansen) round took place on 2 March 2013 at the Löfbergs Lila Arena in Karlstad. "Begging" performed by Anton Ewald and "You" performed by Robin Stjernberg qualified to the final.

==== Final ====
The final was held on 9 March 2013 at the Friends Arena in Stockholm. Ten songs competed—two qualifiers from each of the four preceding heats and two qualifiers from the Second Chance round. The combination of points from a viewer vote and eleven international jury groups determined the winner. The viewers and the juries each had a total of 473 points to award. The nations that comprised the international jury were Croatia, Cyprus, France, Germany, Iceland, Israel, Italy, Malta, Spain, The United Kingdom and Ukraine. "You" performed by Robin Stjernberg was selected as the winner with 166 points.

R/O	Artist	Song	Juries	Televote	Total	Place
1	Ulrik Munther	"Tell the World I'm Here"	82	44	126	3
2	David Lindgren	"Skyline"	57	12	69	8
3	State of Drama	"Falling"	50	18	68	9
4	Anton Ewald	"Begging"	49	59	108	4
5	Louise Hoffsten	"Only the Dead Fish Follow the Stream"	36	49	85	5
6	Ralf Gyllenhammar	"Bed on Fire"	33	40	73	7
7	Ravaillacz	"En riktig jävla schlager"	8	32	40	10
8	Sean Banan	"Copacabanana"	37	41	78	6
9	Robin Stjernberg	"You"	91	75	166	1
10	Yohio	"Heartbreak Hotel"	30	103	133	2

== At Eurovision ==
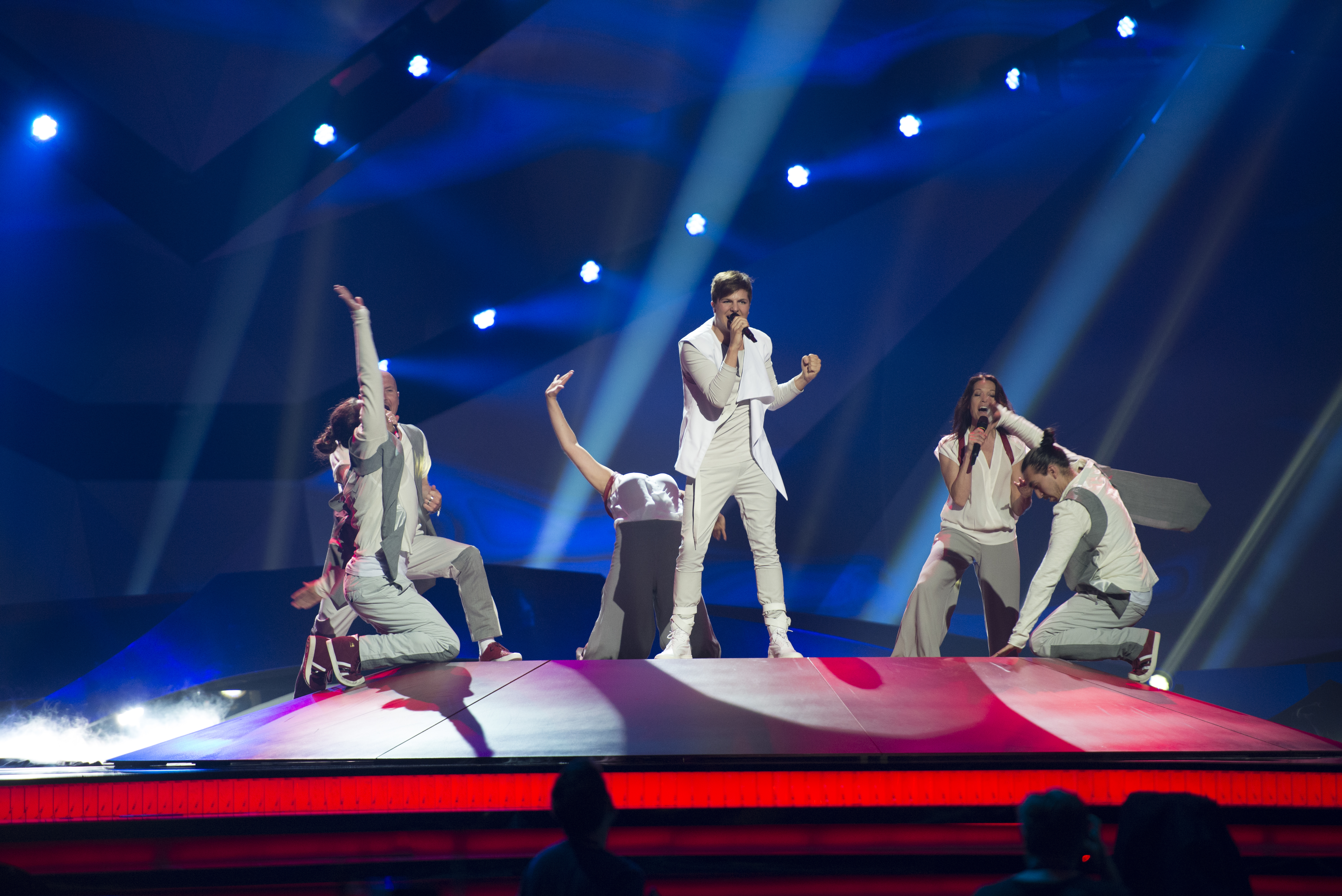
Robin Stjernberg at the final dress rehearsal in Malmö.

As the winner of the Eurovision Song Contest 2012 and host of the 2013 Contest, Sweden automatically qualified for a place in the final, held on 18 May 2013. In addition to their participation in the final, Sweden was assigned to vote in the first semi-final on 14 May 2013.

As the host nation, Sweden's running order position in the final was determined by draw, rather than being assigned by the producers of the show. On 18 March 2013 during the heads of delegation meeting, Sweden was drawn to perform 16th in the final. In the final, Sweden performed following United Kingdom and preceding Hungary. Sweden placed 14th in the final, scoring 62 points.

In Sweden, both the semi-finals and the final were broadcast on SVT1, with commentary provided by Josefine Sundström. The competition was also broadcast via radio on Sveriges Radio P4 with commentary by Carolina Norén for all three shows, Ronnie Ritterland for the semi-finals and Björn Kjellman for the grand final.

The national jury that provided 50% of the Swedish vote in the first semi-final and the final consisted of: Ralf Gyllenhammar (singer), Erik Rapp (singer), Daniel Breitholtz (A&R-manager at Sony BMG), Karin Gunnarsson (Sveriges Radio P3 editor) and Monika Starck (backing vocalist). SVT appointed Yohio as it spokesperson to announce the Swedish votes in the grand final.

The Swedish entry was awarded one of the three Marcel Bezençon Awards, which honour the best of the competing entries for the 2013 Contest in different areas of achievement. Sweden received the Composer Award, which was awarded to the best and most original composition as voted by the participating composers in the competition.

=== Voting ===
==== Points awarded to Sweden ====
Points awarded to Sweden (Final)
Score	Country
12 points	Norway
10 points	
8 points	Denmark
7 points	
6 points	Slovenia
5 points	Ireland; Moldova
4 points	Bulgaria; Finland; Iceland; Latvia
3 points	Germany; Netherlands
2 points	
1 point	Belgium; Croatia; Estonia; Serbia

==== Points awarded by Sweden ====
Points awarded by Sweden (Semi-final 1)
Score	Country
12 points	Denmark
10 points	Russia
8 points	Netherlands
7 points	Belgium
6 points	Estonia
5 points	Moldova
4 points	Serbia
3 points	Ireland
2 points	Montenegro
1 point	Ukraine

Points awarded by Sweden (Final)
Score	Country
12 points	Norway
10 points	Denmark
8 points	Netherlands
7 points	Belgium
6 points	Iceland
5 points	Russia
4 points	Romania
3 points	Hungary
2 points	Ireland
1 point	United Kingdom

==== Detailed voting results ====
Detailed voting results from Sweden (Semi-final 1)
R/O	Country	Jury Rank	Combined Rank	Points
01	Austria	7		
02	Estonia	8	5	6
03	Slovenia	15		
04	Croatia	14		
05	Denmark	1	1	12
06	Russia	2	2	10
07	Ukraine	9	10	1
08	Netherlands	5	3	8
09	Montenegro	6	9	2
10	Lithuania	16		
11	Belarus	13		
12	Moldova	3	6	5
13	Ireland	10	8	3
14	Cyprus	12		
15	Belgium	4	4	7
16	Serbia	11	7	4

Detailed voting results from Sweden (Final)
R/O	Country	Jury Rank	Combined Rank	Points
01	France	10		
02	Lithuania	25		
03	Moldova	3		
04	Finland	21		
05	Spain	24		
06	Belgium	4	4	7
07	Estonia	9		
08	Belarus	23		
09	Malta	20		
10	Russia	7	6	5
11	Germany	13		
12	Armenia	17		
13	Netherlands	2	3	8
14	Romania	14	7	4
15	United Kingdom	8	10	1
16	Sweden			
17	Hungary	19	8	3
18	Denmark	6	2	10
19	Iceland	11	5	6
20	Azerbaijan	15		
21	Greece	18		
22	Ukraine	16		
23	Italy	5		
24	Norway	1	1	12
25	Georgia	22		
26	Ireland	12	9	2
