= Finland in the Eurovision Song Contest 2013 =

- Eurovision Song Contest 2013
- Participating broadcaster: Yleisradio (Yle)
- Country: Finland
- Selection process: Uuden Musiikin Kilpailu 2013
- Selection date: 9 February 2013

Competing entry
- Song: "Marry Me"
- Artist: Krista Siegfrids
- Songwriters: Krista Siegfrids; Erik Nyholm; Kristofer Karlsson; Jessika Lundström

Placement
- Semi-final result: Qualified (9th, 64 points)
- Final result: 24th, 13 points

Participation chronology

Finland was represented at the Eurovision Song Contest 2013 with the song "Marry Me", written by Krista Siegfrids, Erik Nyholm, Kristofer Karlsson, and Jessika Lundström, and performed by Siegfrids herself. Finnish participating broadcaster, Yleisradio (Yle), organised the national final Uuden Musiikin Kilpailu 2013 in order to select its entry for the contest. 12 entries were selected to compete in the national final, which consisted of two heats, a semi-final and a final, taking place in January and February 2013. Eight entries ultimately competed in the final on 9 February where the 50/50 combination of votes from a four-member judging panel and votes from the public selected "Marry Me" performed by Krista Siegfrids as the winner.

Finland participated in the second semi-final of the Eurovision Song Contest on May 16, 2013. Performing "Marry Me" in the 5th position, they secured a place among the top 10 entries, qualifying for the final on May 18. In the semi-final, Finland finished ninth out of 17 countries with 64 points. In the final, they performed 4th and placed twenty-fourth out of 26 countries, scoring a total of 13 points.

== Background ==
Prior to the 2013 contest, Yleisradio (Yle) had participated in the Eurovision Song Contest representing Finland forty-six times since its first entry in 1961. It has won the contest once in 2006 with the song "Hard Rock Hallelujah" performed by Lordi. In 2012, "När jag blundar" performed by Pernilla failed to qualify Finland to the final, placing twelfth in the semi-final.

As part of its duties as participating broadcaster, Yle organises the selection of its entry in the Eurovision Song Contest and broadcasts the event in the country. The broadcaster confirmed its intentions to participate at the 2013 contest on 4 June 2012. Yle had selected its entries for the contest through national final competitions that have varied in format over the years. Since 1961, a selection show that was often titled Euroviisukarsinta highlighted that the purpose of the program was to select a song for Eurovision. However, in 2012, the broadcaster has organised the selection show Uuden Musiikin Kilpailu (UMK), which focuses on showcasing new music with the winning song being selected as the Finnish entry. Along with its participation confirmation, the broadcaster also announced that its entry for the 2013 contest would be selected through Uuden Musiikin Kilpailu 2013.

== Before Eurovision ==
=== Uuden Musiikin Kilpailu 2013 ===
Uuden Musiikin Kilpailu 2013 was the second edition of Uuden Musiikin Kilpailu (UMK), the music competition that selects Finland's entries for the Eurovision Song Contest. The competition consisted of four shows that commenced with the first of two heats on 17 January 2013, followed by a semi-final on 31 January 2013 and concluded with a final on 9 February 2013. The four shows were hosted by YleX DJs Anne Lainto and Ile Uusivuori. All shows were broadcast on Yle TV2, Yle HD and online at yle.fi/umk. The final was also broadcast online at the official Eurovision Song Contest website eurovision.tv as well as via radio on Yle Radio Suomi and with commentary in Swedish on Yle X3M.

==== Format ====
The format of the competition consisted of four shows: two heats, a semi-final and a final. Six songs competed in each heat and the top two entries from each heat qualified directly to the final, while the entries placed third to fifth qualified to the semi-final. Six songs competed in the semi-final and the top four entries from the semi-final qualified to complete the eight-song lineup in the final. The results for the four shows were determined by the 50/50 combination of public voting and a four-member judging panel. Each judge assigned scores to each entry ranging from 1 (lowest score) to 10 (highest score), while public voting included the options of telephone and SMS voting.

The judging panel participated in each show by providing feedback to the competing artists and selecting entries to qualify in the competition. The panel consisted of:

- Toni Wirtanen – Heavy metal singer and leader of the band Apulanta
- Aija Puurtinen – Singer and music professor
- Tomi Saarinen – Head of Music at YleX
- Redrama – Rapper

==== Competing entries ====
A submission period was opened by Yle which lasted between 3 September 2012 and 16 September 2012. At least one of the writers and the lead singer(s) had to hold Finnish citizenship or live in Finland permanently in order for the entry to qualify to compete. A panel of experts appointed by Yle selected twelve entries for the competition from over 470 received submissions and the competing entries were presented over three televised preview programmes between 27 December 2012 and 10 January 2013.

Artist	Song	Songwriter(s)
Arion	"Lost"	Iivo Kaipainen
Atlético Kumpula	"Paperilyhty"	Kyösti Salokorpi
Diandra	"Colliding Into You"	Patric Sarin, Leri Leskinen, Sharon Vaughn
Elina Orkoneva	"He's Not My Man"	Elina Orkoneva
Great Wide North	"Flags"	Kaj Kiviniemi, Mika Kiviniemi
Iina Salin	"Last Night"	Iina Salin, Tommi Gröhn
Ilari Hämäläinen	"Sytytä mut vaan"	Ilari Hämäläinen
Krista Siegfrids	"Marry Me"	Krista Siegfrids, Erik Nyholm, Kristofer Karlsson, Jessika Lundström
Last Panda	"Saturday Night Forever"	Henry Tikkanen, Aapo Immonen
Lucy Was Driving	"Dancing All Around the Universe"	Lucy Was Driving, Otso Koskelo
Mikael Saari	"We Should Be Through"	Mikael Saari
Rautakoura	"Ilmalaivalla"	Lauri Häme

==== Shows ====
===== Heats =====
The two heats took place on 17 and 24 January 2013 at the Club "Circus" in Helsinki. The top two from the six competing entries in each heat directly qualified to the final based on a 50/50 combination of public votes and judges' votes, while the entries placed third to fifth advanced to the semi-final.

Heat 1 – 17 January 2013
R/O	Artist	Song	Jury Votes					Result
R/O	Artist	Song	T. Wirtanen	A. Puurtinen	T. Saarinen	Redrama	Total	Result
1	Iina Salin	"Last Night"	6	8	8	7	29	Semi-final
2	Last Panda	"Saturday Night Forever"	8	6	7	6	27	Semi-final
3	Mikael Saari	"We Should Be Through"	10	10	9	9	38	Final
4	Ilari Hämäläinen	"Sytytä mut vaan"	5	6	6	4	21	—N/a
5	Rautakoura	"Ilmalaivalla"	7	6	7	6	26	Semi-final
6	Diandra	"Colliding Into You"	8	8	8	8	32	Final

Heat 2 – 24 January 2013
R/O	Artist	Song	Jury Votes					Result
R/O	Artist	Song	T. Wirtanen	A. Puurtinen	T. Saarinen	Redrama	Total	Result
1	Atlético Kumpula	"Paperilyhty"	7	6	8	7	28	—N/a
2	Krista Siegfrids	"Marry Me"	8	8	9	9	34	Final
3	Lucy Was Driving	"Dancing All Around the Universe"	6	7	7	6	26	Semi-final
4	Arion	"Lost"	9	9	9	8	35	Final
5	Elina Orkoneva	"He's Not My Man"	6	7	7	6	26	Semi-final
6	Great Wide North	"Flags"	9	9	9	9	36	Semi-final

===== Semi-final =====
The semi-final show took place on 31 January 2013 at the Club "Circus" in Helsinki. The top four from the six competing entries qualified to the final based on a 50/50 combination of public votes and judges' votes. In addition to the performances of the competing entries, Elonkerjuu performed as the interval act.

Semi-final – 31 January 2013
R/O	Artist	Song	Jury Votes					Result
R/O	Artist	Song	T. Wirtanen	A. Puurtinen	T. Saarinen	Redrama	Total	Result
1	Last Panda	"Saturday Night Forever"	6	6	6	6	24	Advanced
2	Elina Orkoneva	"He's Not My Man"	6	8	9	9	32	Advanced
3	Rautakoura	"Ilmalaivalla"	6	6	6	6	24	—N/a
4	Great Wide North	"Flags"	10	10	10	10	40	Advanced
5	Iina Salin	"Last Night"	5	7	6	6	24	—N/a
6	Lucy Was Driving	"Dancing All Around the Universe"	5	6	5	6	22	Advanced

===== Final =====
The final took place on 9 February 2013 at the Barona Areena in Espoo where the eight entries that qualified from the preceding three shows competed. "Marry Me" performed by Krista Siegfrids was selected as the winner by a 50/50 combination of public votes and the four judges. Each judge assigned points to each entry ranging from 1 (lowest score) to 10 (highest score). The viewer vote was based on the percentage of votes each song achieved through the following voting methods: telephone and SMS voting.

In addition to the performances of the competing entries, the interval act featured Teflon Brothers featuring Meiju Suvas and Stig, Suvi Teräsniska, Johanna Iivanainen, Emma Salokoski, Kaisa Vala, 2007 Finnish Eurovision entrant Hanna Pakarinen and 2012 Finnish Eurovision entrant Pernilla Karlsson.

Final – 9 February 2013
R/O	Artist	Song	Jury	Televote	Total	Place
1	Arion	"Lost"	13.5%	7.0%	10.2%	5
2	Elina Orkoneva	"He's Not My Man"	11.5%	5.2%	8.4%	6
3	Lucy Was Driving	"Dancing All Around the Universe"	9.6%	1.6%	5.6%	7
4	Krista Siegfrids	"Marry Me"	14.6%	38.6%	26.6%	1
5	Last Panda	"Saturday Night Forever"	9.2%	1.4%	5.3%	8
6	Mikael Saari	"We Should Be Through"	14.6%	18.4%	16.5%	2
7	Great Wide North	"Flags"	14.6%	12.0%	13.3%	4
8	Diandra	"Colliding Into You"	12.3%	15.8%	14.1%	3

Detailed Jury Votes
R/O	Song	T. Wirtanen	A. Puurtinen	T. Saarinen	Redrama	Total	Percentage
1	"Lost"	9	9	9	8	35	13.5%
2	"He's Not My Man"	7	8	7	8	30	11.5%
3	"Dancing All Around the Universe"	6	7	6	6	25	9.6%
4	"Marry Me"	9	9	10	10	38	14.6%
5	"Saturday Night Forever"	6	6	6	6	24	9.2%
6	"We Should Be Through"	10	10	9	9	38	14.6%
7	"Flags"	10	10	9	9	38	14.6%
8	"Colliding Into You"	8	8	8	8	32	12.3%

=== Promotion ===
Krista Siegfrids made several appearances across Europe to specifically promote "Marry Me" as the Finnish Eurovision entry. On 13 April, Siegfrids performed during the Eurovision in Concert event which was held at the Melkweg venue in Amsterdam, Netherlands and hosted by Marlayne and Linda Wagenmakers. On 21 April, Siegfrids performed during the London Eurovision Party, which was held at the Café de Paris venue in London, United Kingdom and hosted by Nicki French and Paddy O'Connell.

In addition to her international appearances, promotional activities also occurred in Finland where Krista Siegfrids performed "Marry Me" during the Miss Drag Queen Finland 2013 contest at the DTM venue in Helsinki on 4 April and the Yle TV2 show Tartu Mikkiin on 5 April. Siegfrids also released a new single, "Amen", which she performed for the first time during the Welcome to Finland Justin Bieber event on 26 April. Her debut album Ding Dong! was released on 10 May 2013 with prior interviews to promote its release.

== At Eurovision ==
Krista Siegfrids presenting herself and "Marry Me" at the Eurovision Song Contest 2013

According to Eurovision rules, all nations with the exceptions of the host country and the "Big Five" (France, Germany, Italy, Spain and the United Kingdom) are required to qualify from one of two semi-finals in order to compete for the final; the top ten countries from each semi-final progress to the final. The European Broadcasting Union (EBU) split up the competing countries into six different pots based on voting patterns from previous contests, with countries with favourable voting histories put into the same pot. On 17 January 2013, a special allocation draw was held which placed each country into one of the two semi-finals, as well as which half of the show they would perform in. Finland was placed into the second semi-final, held on 16 May 2013, and was scheduled to perform in the first half of the show.

Once all the competing songs for the 2013 contest had been released, the running order for the semi-finals was decided by the shows' producers rather than through another draw, so that similar songs were not placed next to each other. Finland was set to position 5, following the entry from Azerbaijan and before the entry from Malta.

The two semi-finals and the final were televised in Finland on Yle TV2 with a second audio program providing commentary in Finnish by Aino Töllinen and Juuso Mäkilähde and in Swedish by Eva Frantz and Johan Lindroos. The three shows were broadcast via radio with Finnish commentary by Sanna Kojo and Jorma Hietamäki on Yle Radio Suomi and with Swedish commentary by Eva Frantz and Johan Lindroos on Yle Radio Vega. The Finnish spokesperson, who announced the Finnish votes during the final, was Kristiina Wheeler.

=== Semi-final ===
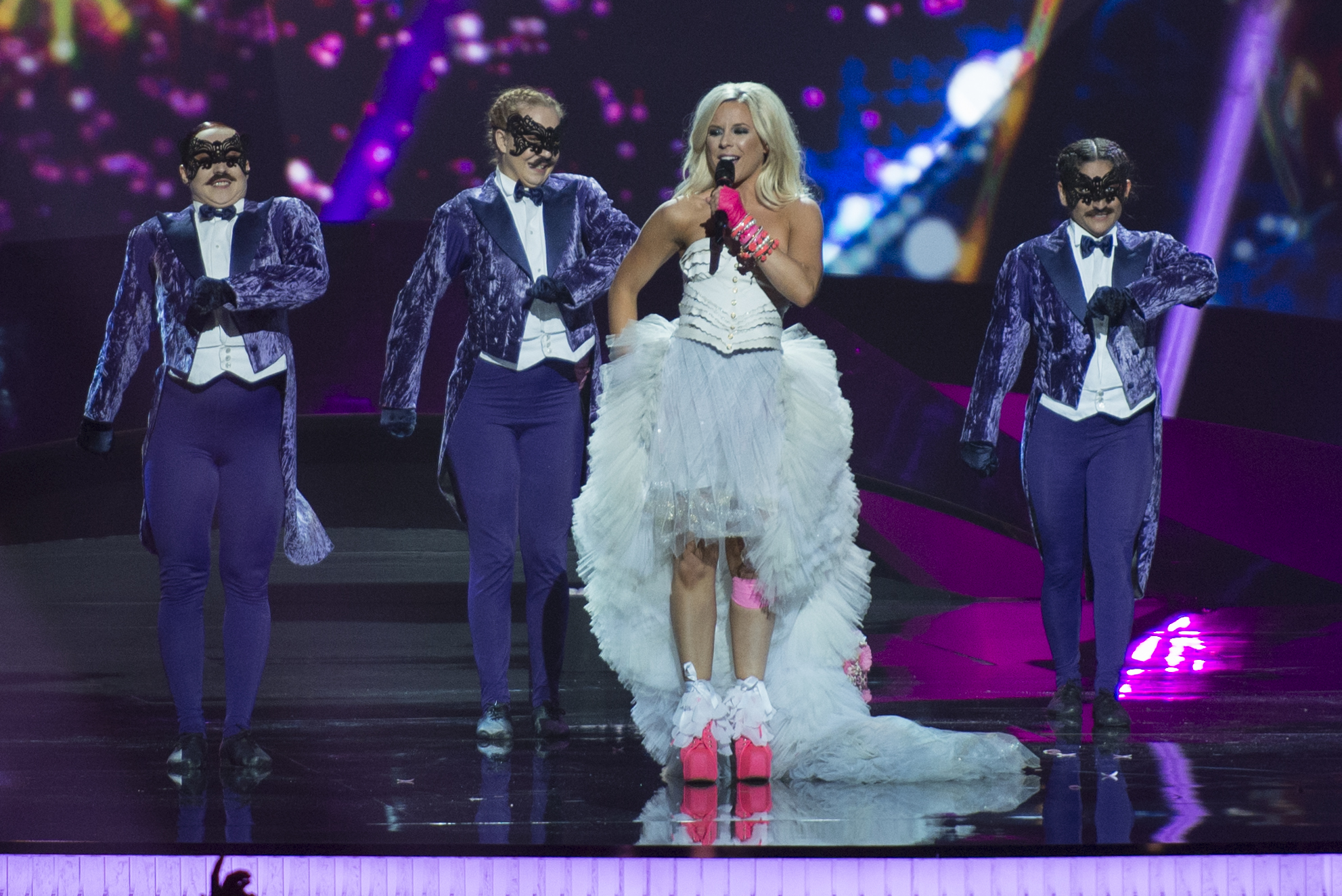
Krista Siegfrids during a rehearsal before the second semi-final

Krista Siegfrids took part in technical rehearsals on 8 and 11 May, followed by dress rehearsals on 15 and 16 May. This included the jury show on 15 May where the professional juries of each country watched and voted on the competing entries.

The Finnish performance featured Krista Siegfrids performing in a white wedding dress joined by three dancers wearing purple suits with black eye masks, which later transformed to pink dresses, and two backing vocalists wearing red maid outfits. Siegfrids and the dancers performed a dance routine together which included Siegfrids picking petals from a forget-me-not while being lifted up as well as having a wedding veil being put on her head which she later ripped off. The performance was ended with a lesbian kiss between Siegfrids and one of the backing vocalists. In regards to the kiss, Siegfrids stated: "The kiss is not a surprise anymore; it's 2013, and I can kiss anyone I want. There's no stopping us in the live shows." The performance also featured pyrotechnic effects and the use of confetti. The three dancers that joined Krista Siegfrids on stage were Haza Kajipoori, Katrin Vaskelainen and Kiira Kilpiö, while the two backing vocalists were Emelie Granvik and Reetta Korhonen.

At the end of the show, Finland was announced as having finished in the top 10 and subsequently qualifying for the grand final. It was later revealed that Finland placed ninth in the semi-final, receiving a total of 64 points.

=== Final ===
Shortly after the second semi-final, a winners' press conference was held for the ten qualifying countries. As part of this press conference, the qualifying artists took part in a draw to determine which half of the grand final they would subsequently participate in. This draw was done in the order the countries appeared in the semi-final running order. Finland was drawn to compete in the first half. Following this draw, the shows' producers decided upon the running order of the final, as they had done for the semi-finals. Finland was subsequently placed to perform in position 4, following the entry from Moldova and before the entry from Spain.

Krista Siegfrids once again took part in dress rehearsals on 17 and 18 May before the final, including the jury final where the professional juries cast their final votes before the live show. Siegfrids performed a repeat of her semi-final performance during the final on 18 May. At the conclusion of the voting, Finland finished in twenty-fourth place with 13 points.

=== Voting ===
Voting during the three shows consisted of 50 percent public televoting and 50 percent from a jury deliberation. The jury consisted of five music industry professionals who were citizens of the country they represent. This jury was asked to judge each contestant based on: vocal capacity; the stage performance; the song's composition and originality; and the overall impression by the act. In addition, no member of a national jury could be related in any way to any of the competing acts in such a way that they cannot vote impartially and independently. The following members comprised the Finnish jury: Patric Sarin, Sana Mustonen, Susanna Laine, Mikael Saari and Kyösti Salokorpi.

Following the release of the full split voting by the EBU after the conclusion of the competition, it was revealed that Finland had placed tenth with the public televote and sixth with the jury vote in the semi-final. In the public vote, Finland received an average rank of 8.89, while with the jury vote, Finland received an average rank of 7.05. In the final, Finland had placed twentieth with the public televote and eighteenth with the jury vote. In the public vote, Finland received an average rank of 16.68, while with the jury vote, Finland received an average rank of 13.77.

Below is a breakdown of points awarded to Finland and awarded by Finland in the second semi-final and grand final of the contest, and the breakdown of the jury voting and televoting conducted during the two shows:

==== Points awarded to Finland ====
Points awarded to Finland (Semi-final 2)
Score	Country
12 points	
10 points	
8 points	Latvia; Norway; Spain
7 points	France; Iceland; San Marino
6 points	
5 points	Hungary
4 points	
3 points	Azerbaijan; Germany; Romania
2 points	Switzerland
1 point	Albania; Israel; Malta

Points awarded to Finland (Final)
Score	Country
12 points	
10 points	
8 points	
7 points	
6 points	
5 points	
4 points	Israel
3 points	France; San Marino
2 points	Denmark
1 point	Germany

==== Points awarded by Finland ====
Points awarded by Finland (Semi-final 2)
Score	Country
12 points	Iceland
10 points	Norway
8 points	Hungary
7 points	Greece
6 points	Switzerland
5 points	Malta
4 points	Romania
3 points	Azerbaijan
2 points	Israel
1 point	San Marino

Points awarded by Finland (Final)
Score	Country
12 points	Norway
10 points	Hungary
8 points	Netherlands
7 points	Denmark
6 points	Estonia
5 points	Iceland
4 points	Sweden
3 points	Belgium
2 points	Russia
1 point	Greece
