= Russia in the Eurovision Song Contest 2013 =

- Eurovision Song Contest 2013
- Country: Russia
- Selection process: Internal selection
- Announcement date: Artist: 19 February 2013; Song: 24 February 2013

Competing entry
- Song: "What If"
- Artist: Dina Garipova
- Songwriters: Gabriel Alares; Joakim Björnberg; Leonid Gutkin

Placement
- Semi-final result: Qualified (2nd, 156 points)
- Final result: 5th, 174 points

Participation chronology

Russia was represented at the Eurovision Song Contest 2013 with the song "What If", written by Gabriel Alares, Joakim Björnberg, and Leonid Gutkin, and performed by Dina Garipova. The Russian entry was selected through an internal selection, organised by Russian broadcaster Channel One Russia (C1R). Russia qualified from the first semi-final of the competition and placed 5th in the final with 174 points.

== Before Eurovision ==
=== Internal selection ===
On 30 November 2012, C1R announced a submission period for interested artists and composers to submit their entries through an online form. On 19 February 2013, C1R announced that they had internally selected Dina Garipova to represent Russia in Malmö. Garipova previously won the first season of talent show Golos. The Russian song, "What If", was presented to the public on 24 February 2013 during the C1R television programme Vremya. "What If" was written and composed by Gabriel Alares, Joakim Björnberg and Leonid Gutkin.

=== Plagiarism accusations ===
After the presentation of the song, several media outlets reported the possibility of plagiarism of several previously released songs: "Skin on Skin" originally recorded by Sarah Connor, "Pozwól żyć" originally recorded by Gosia Andrzejewicz, "All Over The World" originally recorded by Brian Kennedy and "Carried Away" originally recorded by Hear'Say.

== At Eurovision ==
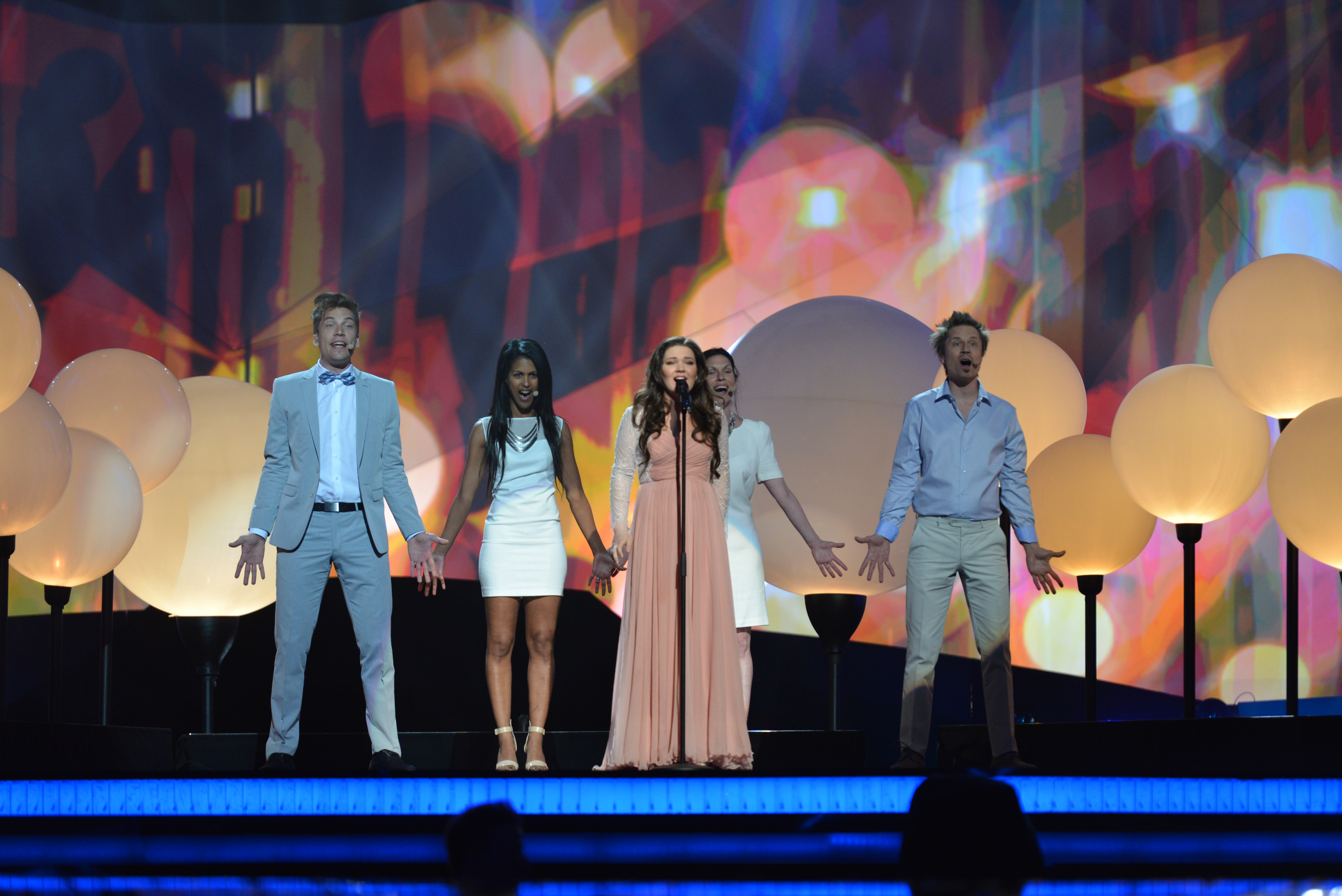
Dina Garipova at the first semi-final dress rehearsal in Malmö.

Russia was allocated to compete in the first semi-final on 14 May for a place in the final on 18 May. In the first semifinal, the producers of the show decided that Russia would perform 6th, following Denmark and preceding Ukraine. On stage, Garipova was joined by four backing vocalists: Alexandra Hamnede, Anders von Hofsten, Sofia Lilja and song co-author Gabriel Alares. The Russian performance featured Garipova dressed in a long beige dress, surrounded by shining white bubbles.

Russia qualified from the first semi-final, placing 2nd and scoring 156 points. At the first semi-final winners' press conference, Russia was allocated to perform in the first half of the final. In the final, the producers of the show decided that Russia would perform 10th, following Malta and preceding Germany. Russia placed 5th in the final, scoring 174 points.

In Russia, both the semi-finals and the final were broadcast on Channel One, with commentary provided by Yana Churikova and Yuriy Aksyuta.

The national jury that provided 50% of the Russian vote in the first semi-final and the final consisted of composer Vladimir Matetsky and four previous Russian participants in the Contest: Youddiph (1994), Philipp Kirkorov (1995), Yulia Savicheva (2004) and Dima Bilan (2006 and 2008). The Russian spokesperson in the grand final was Alsou, who had represented Russia previously in the 2000 Contest as well as co-hosting the final in 2009.

=== Voting ===
==== Points awarded to Russia ====
Points awarded to Russia (Semi-final 1)
Score	Country
12 points	Denmark
10 points	Austria; Belarus; Cyprus; Estonia; Ireland; Lithuania; Slovenia; Sweden; United Kingdom
8 points	Croatia; Moldova
7 points	Belgium; Montenegro; Netherlands; Ukraine
6 points	Serbia
5 points	
4 points	Italy
3 points	
2 points	
1 point	

Points awarded to Russia (Final)
Score	Country
12 points	Estonia; Latvia
10 points	Ireland; Slovenia; United Kingdom
8 points	Belarus; Serbia
7 points	Armenia; Denmark; Israel; Lithuania; Moldova; Montenegro
6 points	Croatia; France; Georgia; Macedonia; Spain
5 points	Bulgaria; Cyprus; Sweden
4 points	Belgium; Netherlands; Ukraine
3 points	
2 points	Finland; Germany
1 point	Iceland

==== Points awarded by Russia ====
Points awarded by Russia (Semi-final 1)
Score	Country
12 points	Moldova
10 points	Denmark
8 points	Belgium
7 points	Ukraine
6 points	Ireland
5 points	Estonia
4 points	Croatia
3 points	Netherlands
2 points	Belarus
1 point	Lithuania

Points awarded by Russia (Final)
Score	Country
12 points	Azerbaijan
10 points	Greece
8 points	Belgium
7 points	Norway
6 points	Moldova
5 points	Georgia
4 points	Denmark
3 points	Netherlands
2 points	Armenia
1 point	Ukraine
