= Moldova in the Eurovision Song Contest 2013 =

- Eurovision Song Contest 2013
- Participating broadcaster: TeleRadio-Moldova (TRM)
- Country: Moldova
- Selection process: O melodie pentru Europa 2013
- Selection date: 16 March 2013

Competing entry
- Song: "O mie"
- Artist: Aliona Moon
- Songwriters: Pasha Parfeny; Iuliana Scutaru

Placement
- Semi-final result: Qualified (4th, 95 points)
- Final result: 11th, 71 points

Participation chronology

Moldova was represented at the Eurovision Song Contest 2013 with the song "O mie" written by Iuliana Scutari and Pasha Parfeni. The song was performed by Aliona Moon. Songwriter Pavel Parfeni represented Moldova in the Eurovision Song Contest 2012 with the song "Lăutar" where he placed eleventh in the grand final of the competition. The Moldovan broadcaster TeleRadio-Moldova (TRM) organised the national final O melodie pentru Europa 2013 in order to select the Moldovan entry for the 2013 contest in Malmö, Sweden. 49 artists and 126 songs competed to represent Moldova in Malmö, with 24 artists and songs being shortlisted to participate in the televised national final. After two semi-finals and a final which took place in March 2013, "A Million" performed by Aliona Moon emerged as the winner after gaining the most points following the combination of votes from a jury panel and a public televote. The song was later translated from English to Romanian for the Eurovision Song Contest and was titled "O mie". This was the first time that the Moldovan song was performed entirely in the Romanian language at the Eurovision Song Contest.

Moldova was drawn to compete in the first semi-final of the Eurovision Song Contest which took place on 14 May 2013. Performing during the show in position 12, "O mie" was announced among the top 10 entries of the first semi-final and therefore qualified to compete in the final on 18 May. It was later revealed that Moldova placed fourth out of the 16 participating countries in the semi-final with 95 points. In the final, Moldova performed in position 3 and placed eleventh out of the 26 participating countries, scoring 71 points.

== Background ==
Prior to the 2013 Contest, Moldova had participated in the Eurovision Song Contest eight times since its first entry in 2005. The nation's best placing in the contest was sixth, which it achieved in 2005 with the song "Boonika bate doba" performed by Zdob și Zdub. Other than their debut entry, to this point, Moldova's only other top ten placing at the contest was achieved in 2007 where "Fight" performed by Natalia Barbu placed tenth. In the 2012 contest, "Lăutar" performed by Pasha Parfeny qualified Moldova to compete in the final and placed eleventh.

The Moldovan national broadcaster, TeleRadio-Moldova (TRM), broadcast the event within Moldova and organised the selection process for the nation's entry. TRM confirmed their intentions to participate at the 2013 Eurovision Song Contest on 18 September 2012. Moldova has selected their entry via a national selection show since 2008, a procedure that was continued for their 2013 participation.

== Before Eurovision ==
=== O melodie pentru Europa 2013 ===
O melodie pentru Europa 2013 was the national final format developed by TRM in order to select Moldova's entry for the Eurovision Song Contest 2013. The event included two semi-finals and a final to be held on 12, 14 and 16 March 2013, respectively. All shows in the competition were broadcast on Moldova 1, Radio Moldova and Radio Moldova Tineret as well as online via the broadcaster's official website trm.md. The final was broadcast online at the official Eurovision Song Contest website eurovision.tv.

==== Format ====
The selection of the competing entries for the national final and ultimately the Moldovan Eurovision entry took place over two rounds. The first round occurred on 17 January 2013 where a jury panel shortlisted twenty-four artists and sixty songs from the received submissions to proceed to the second round, the televised national final. Submissions were assessed on criteria such as voice quality and manner of the performer, originality of the song and quality of the melody and composition. Each of the 24 semi-finalists selected one of the 60 songs to perform during the national final, with 12 competing in each semi-final on 12 and 14 March 2013. Seven songs qualified to the final from each semi-final based on the combined votes from an expert jury and public televoting results. The fourteen qualifying entries competed in the final on 16 March 2013 where the winner was selected by the 50/50 combination of an expert jury vote and a public televote. In the event of a tie, the entry that receives the highest score from the expert jury vote was declared the winner.

==== Competing entries ====
Artists and composers had the opportunity to separately submit their applications and entries between 13 December 2012 and 10 January 2013. Artists were required to be of Moldovan nationality, while songwriters could hold any nationality and submit more than one song, which could only be performed in either English or Romanian. At the conclusion of the submission deadline, 49 artist applications and 126 valid songs were received by the broadcaster. A jury consisting of Nelly Ciobanu (singer, 2009 Moldovan Eurovision entrant), Vladimir Beleaev (composer), Geta Burlacu (singer, 2008 Moldovan Eurovision entrant), Vali Boghean (singer-songwriter), Tatiana Cergă (performer), Valentin Dânga (composer), Victoria Tcacenco (professor at the Music, Theatre and Fine Arts Academy) and Nicu Țărnă (singer) selected 24 semi-finalists out of the 49 received applications, each of them which subsequently selected one of the 60 songs shortlisted by the jury panel out of the 126 received and announced on 18 January 2013.

On 17 February 2013, Dara withdrew from the competition due to artistic mismatch and was replaced with the song "Underestimated" performed by Diana Staver. On 3 March 2013, "Hi-Ho" performed by Denis Latîşev was withdrawn from the competition and replaced with the song "Coma" performed by Margarita Ciorici.

Artist	Song	Songwriter(s)
Alexandru Şendrea	"In My Head"	Michael James Down
Aliona Moon	"A Million"	Iuliana Scutari, Serghei Legheida, Pavel Parfeni
Anna Gulko	"Somebody Else"	Roman Lupu
Aurel Chirtoacă	"Iartă-mă"	Eugenia Andries-Carabut
Boris Covali	"Runaways"	Hanif Sabzevari, Frederik Akerlund, Michael James Down
Cristina Croitoru and Karizma	"Never Fall Again"	Cristina Croitoru, Olga Fesenco
Cristina Scarlat	"I Pray"	Ivan Aculov, Lidia Scarlat
Cristina V. and Glam Girls	"Celebrate"	Hanif Sabzevari, Mike Eriksson, Johnny Sanekes, Michael James Down
Denis Latîşev	"Hi-Ho"	N/A
Diana Staver	"Underestimated"	Thomas Thörnholm, Martin Englund, Danne Attlerud
Doiniţa Gherman	"Planeta e un rai"	Doinița Gherman, Ricu Vodă, Cătălin Gondiu
Felicia Dunaf	"Codename Felice"	Eugen Doibani
FireLove	"Just Smile"	Irina Gondiu
Inaya	"I Need You Now"	Ylva Persson, Linda Persson
Irina Kitoroagă	"L.o.v.e. Love"	John Ballard, Ruth Mussie, Jerusalem Yemane, Irena Krsteva, Kian Fakhary
Irina Tarasiuk	"Dancing Hearts"	Serghei Covalischii, Alina Dabija
Margarita Ciorici	"Coma"	Hanif Sabzevari, Alexander Holmgren, Michael James Down
Nicoleta Gavriliţă	"Freaky Thong"	Hanif Sabzevari, Henri Thiesen, Jimi Thiesen, Michael James Down
Ruslan Țăranu	"Amadeus"	Ruslan Țăranu
Stela Boţan	"Inima mea"	Constantin Dușcu, Stela Boţan
Svetlana Bogdanova	"Conquer My Heart"	Christina Schilling, Camilla Gottschalck, Daniel Nilsson, Henrik Szabo, Jonas Gladnikoff
Tatiana Heghea	"A Brighter Day"	Vasco Cardoso, Ruben Pacheco, Michael James Down
Valeria Paşa and Alex Mataev	"Show Me Your Feelings"	Valeriu Pașa
Vitalie Maciunschi	"I Want You Back"	Mathias Kallenberger, Andreas Berlin, Stephen Leuenberger
Vitalie Negruţă	"You'll Be Mine"	Veaceslav Daniliuc, Andrei Hadjiu

==== Semi-finals ====
The two semi-finals took place on 12 and 14 March 2013 at TRM Studio 2 in Chișinău, hosted by Cătălin Josan and Evelina Vârlan with Lucian Dumitrescu reporting from the green room. In each semi-final twelve songs competed and the top seven songs qualified to the final based on the combination of votes from a public televote and the votes of an expert jury. The jury that voted in the semi-finals included Nicu Țărnă (singer), Geta Burlacu (singer, 2008 Moldovan Eurovision entrant), Nelly Ciobanu (singer, 2009 Moldovan Eurovision entrant), Tatiana Cergă (performer), Ludmila Climoc (Orange Moldova representative), Dorel Burlacu (composer and conductor), Vali Boghean (singer-songwriter) and Victoria Tcacenco (professor at the Music, Theatre and Fine Arts Academy).

In addition to the performances of the competing entries, guest performances featured during the shows, with 2005 and 2011 Moldovan Eurovision entrants Zdob şi Zdub and 2012 Moldovan Eurovision entrant Pasha Parfeny performed as guests in the first semi-final, while 2008 Moldovan Eurovision entrant Geta Burlacu and 2013 Russian Eurovision entrant Dina Garipova performed as guests in the second semi-final.

Semi-final 1 – 12 March 2013
R/O	Artist	Song	Jury	Televote		Total	Place
R/O	Artist	Song	Jury	Percentage	Points	Total	Place
1	Diana Staver	"Underestimated"	0	6.85%	5	5	11
2	Vitalie Maciunschi	"I Want You Back"	3	5.39%	2	5	10
3	Margarita Ciorici	"Coma"	2	6.45%	4	6	8
4	Cristina V. and Glam Girls	"Celebrate"	0	13.46%	8	8	6
5	Doiniţa Gherman	"Planeta e un rai"	6	15.83%	12	18	3
6	Stela Boţan	"Inima mea"	1	4.16%	1	2	12
7	Vitalie Negruţă	"You'll Be Mine"	8	5.85%	3	11	4
8	Aliona Moon	"A Million"	12	12.86%	7	19	2
9	Ruslan Ţaranu	"Amadeus"	5	2.35%	0	5	9
10	Boris Covali	"Runaways"	10	14.70%	10	20	1
11	Felicia Dunaf	"Codename Felice"	4	9.21%	6	10	5
12	Svetlana Bogdanova	"Conquer My Heart"	7	2.89%	0	7	7

Semi-final 2 – 14 March 2013
R/O	Artist	Song	Jury	Televote		Total	Place
R/O	Artist	Song	Jury	Percentage	Points	Total	Place
1	Tatiana Heghea	"A Brighter Day"	4	18.09%	12	16	3
2	Aurel Chirtoacă	"Iartă-mă"	6	6.01%	3	9	7
3	Inaya	"I Need You Now"	3	2.57%	0	3	10
4	Anna Gulko	"Somebody Else"	5	7.93%	5	10	5
5	Valeria Paşa and Alex Mataev	"Show Me Your Feelings"	2	7.13%	4	6	9
6	Nicoleta Gavriliţă	"Freaky Thong"	7	8.67%	6	13	4
7	Irina Tarasiuk	"Dancing Hearts"	1	2.75%	1	2	11
8	FireLove	"Just Smile"	0	2.40%	0	0	12
9	Irina Kitoroagă	"L.o.v.e. Love"	8	5.07%	2	10	6
10	Cristina Scarlat	"I Pray"	12	14.05%	8	20	2
11	Alexandru Şendrea	"In My Head"	0	9.30%	7	7	8
12	Cristina Croitoru and Karizma	"Never Fall Again"	10	16.03%	10	20	1

==== Final ====
The final took place on 16 March 2013 at TRM Studio 2 in Chișinău, hosted by Cătălin Josan and Evelina Vârlan with Lucian Dumitrescu reporting from the green room. The fourteen songs that qualified from the preceding two semi-finals competed and the winner was selected based on the combination of a public televote and the votes of an expert jury. The jury that voted in the final included Nicu Țărnă (singer), Adrian Beldiman (composer, Radio Moldova chief music editor), Vali Boghean (singer-songwriter), Igor Dînga (musician and composer), Eugen Boico (General Director of Publicis Moldova), Tatiana Cergă (performer), Mihai Moldovanu (Deputy Prime Minister of Moldova), Dorel Burlacu (composer and conductor), Iurie Mahovici (composer), Nelly Ciobanu (singer, 2009 Moldovan Eurovision entrant) and Victoria Tcacenco (professor at the Music, Theatre and Fine Arts Academy). In addition to the performances of the competing entries, 2013 Belarusian Eurovision entrant Alyona Lanskaya performed as a guest. "A Million" performed by Aliona Moon was selected as the winner.

Final – 16 March 2013
R/O	Artist	Song	Jury		Televote		Total	Place
R/O	Artist	Song	Votes	Points	Percentage	Points	Total	Place
1	Cristina V. and Glam Girls	"Celebrate"	10	0	1.31%	1	1	12
2	Boris Covali	"Runaways"	103	8	36.49%	12	20	2
3	Cristina Croitoru and Karizma	"Never Fall Again"	77	7	8.51%	8	15	4
4	Svetlana Bogdanova	"Conquer My Heart"	45	2	0.58%	0	2	11
5	Nicoleta Gavriliţă	"Freaky Thong"	47	3	3.29%	4	7	6
6	Aurel Chirtoacă	"Iartă-mă"	58	5	2.50%	2	7	7
7	Irina Kitoroagă	"L.o.v.e. Love"	54	4	0.94%	0	4	10
8	Anna Gulko	"Somebody Else"	40	0	0.82%	0	0	14
9	Vitalie Negruţă	"You'll Be Mine"	64	6	3.24%	3	9	5
10	Cristina Scarlat	"I Pray"	117	10	5.63%	7	17	3
11	Doiniţa Gherman	"Planeta e un rai"	43	1	3.39%	5	6	9
12	Tatiana Heghea	"A Brighter Day"	40	0	3.74%	6	6	8
13	Felicia Dunaf	"Codename Felice"	39	0	1.07%	0	0	13
14	Aliona Moon	"A Million"	121	12	28.49%	10	22	1

Detailed Jury Votes
R/O	Song	N. Țărnă	A. Beldiman	V. Boghean	I. Dînga	E. Boico	T. Cergă	M. Moldovanu	D. Burlacu	I. Mahovici	N. Ciobanu	V. Tcacenco	Total
1	"Celebrate"							3	3			4	10
2	"Runaways"	5	7	10	9	12	9	12	8	11	9	11	103
3	"Never Fall Again"	6	6	4	1	10	10	8	7	9	10	6	77
4	"Conquer My Heart"			5	10	4	1	6		6	4	9	45
5	"Freaky Thong"	2	2	9	6	3	5		4	5	3	8	47
6	"Iartă-mă"	9	8	8		5	3	4	9	3	7	2	58
7	"L.o.v.e. Love"	10	10	3	2	6	8	1	2	4	8		54
8	"Somebody Else"	3	1	7	8		4		6	1	5	5	40
9	"You'll Be Mine"	4	9	6	11	2	2	2	5	10	6	7	64
10	"I Pray"	11	11	11	12	8	12	9	11	8	12	12	117
11	"Planeta e un rai"	8	4	1	5	1		5	10	7	2		43
12	"A Brighter Day"	7	3		4	7	6	7		2	1	3	40
13	"Codename Felice"	1	5	2	3	9	7	10	1			1	39
14	"A Million"	12	12	12	7	11	11	11	12	12	11	10	121

=== Preparation ===
On 18 March, TRM held a meeting with Aliona Moon's team where it was decided that "A Million" would be performed in Romanian, titled "O mie". The song became Moldova's first entry in the contest to be performed entirely in the Romanian language.

=== Promotion ===
Aliona Moon made several appearances across Europe to specifically promote "O mie" as the Moldovan Eurovision entry. Between 8 and 11 April, Aliona Moon took part in promotional activities in Romania where she appeared and performed during the Antena 1 programmes Acces Direct and Neatza, and the Kanal D programme Draga mea prietena. On 13 April, Moon performed during the Eurovision in Concert event which was held at the Melkweg venue in Amsterdam, Netherlands and hosted by Marlayne and Linda Wagenmakers. Aliona Moon also took part in promotional activities in Belarus, Belgium, Russia and Ukraine which included television and radio appearances.

== At Eurovision ==
Aliona Moon presenting herself and "O mie" at the Eurovision Song Contest 2013

According to Eurovision rules, all nations with the exceptions of the host country and the "Big Five" (France, Germany, Italy, Spain and the United Kingdom) are required to qualify from one of two semi-finals in order to compete for the final; the top ten countries from each semi-final progress to the final. The European Broadcasting Union (EBU) split up the competing countries into six different pots based on voting patterns from previous contests, with countries with favourable voting histories put into the same pot. On 17 January 2013, a special allocation draw was held which placed each country into one of the two semi-finals, as well as which half of the show they would perform in. Moldova was placed into the first semi-final, to be held on 14 May 2013, and was scheduled to perform in the second half of the show.

Once all the competing songs for the 2013 contest had been released, the running order for the semi-finals was decided by the shows' producers rather than through another draw, so that similar songs were not placed next to each other. Moldova was set to perform in position 12, following the entry from Belarus and before the entry from Ireland.

The two semi-finals and the final were televised in Moldova on Moldova 1 as well as broadcast via radio on Radio Moldova. All broadcasts featured commentary by Lidia Scarlat. The Moldovan spokesperson, who announced the Moldovan votes during the final, was Olivia Furtună.

=== Semi-final ===
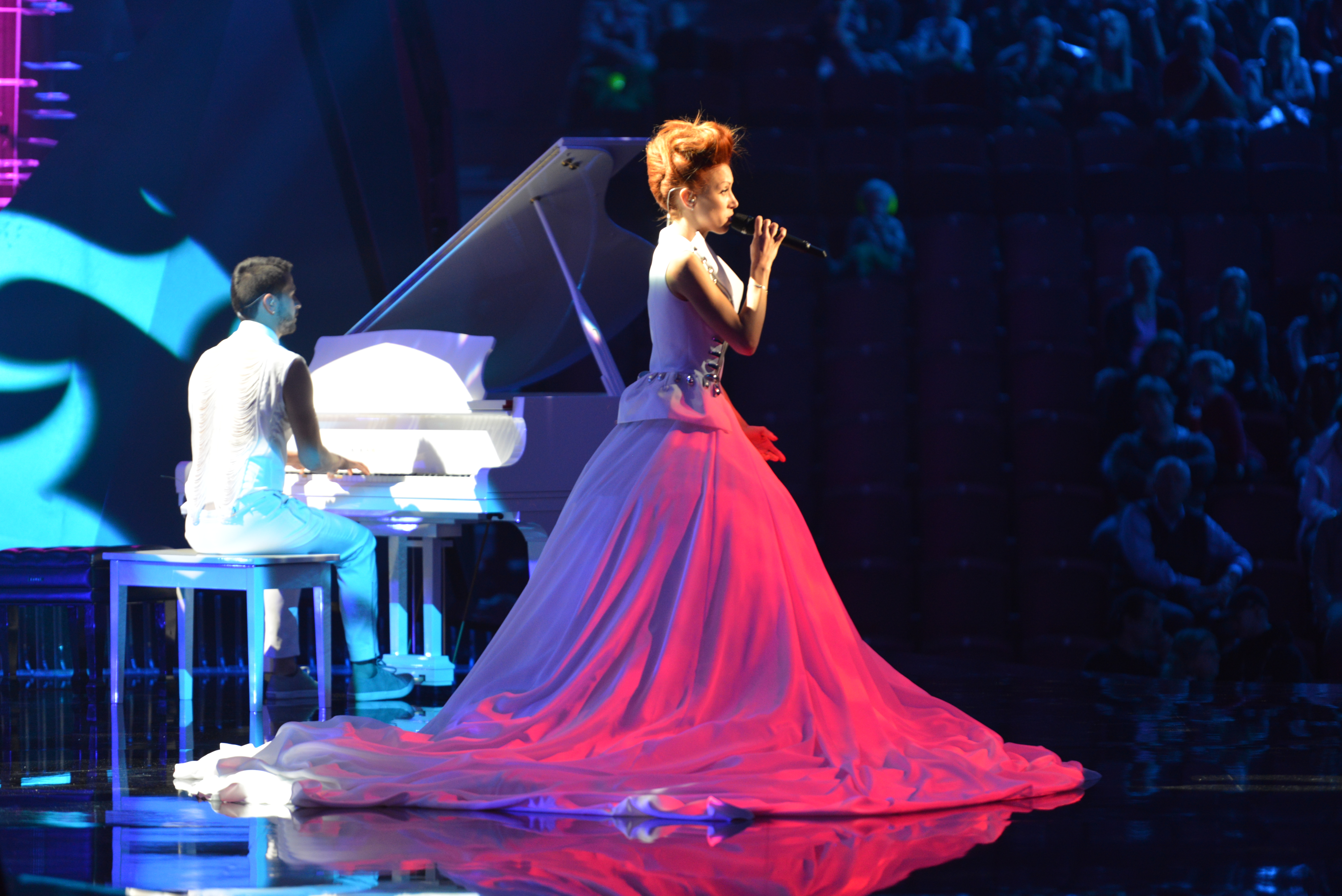
Aliona Moon during a rehearsal before the first semi-final

Aliona Moon took part in technical rehearsals on 7 and 10 May, followed by dress rehearsals on 13 and 14 May. This included the jury show on 13 May where the professional juries of each country watched and voted on the competing entries.

The Moldovan performance featured Aliona Moon dressed in a white dress that displayed projections that transitioned from red colours to blue and grew 5 metres tall when being lifted from a podium, and performing on stage with three dancers and a pianist. The stage featured LED screen projections of a starry sky accompanied by smoke effects. The three dancers that joined Moon on stage are Iuri Rîbac, Vadim Tsurkan and Vova Hincu, while the pianist was Pasha Parfeny who previously represented Moldova in the Eurovision Song Contest 2012 and had co-composed "O mie".

At the end of the show, Moldova was announced as having finished in the top 10 and subsequently qualifying for the grand final. It was later revealed that Moldova placed fourth in the semi-final, receiving a total of 95 points.

=== Final ===
Shortly after the first semi-final, a winners' press conference was held for the ten qualifying countries. As part of this press conference, the qualifying artists took part in a draw to determine which half of the grand final they would subsequently participate in. This draw was done in the order the countries appeared in the semi-final running order. Moldova was drawn to compete in the first half. Following this draw, the shows' producers decided upon the running order of the final, as they had done for the semi-finals. Moldova was subsequently placed to perform in position 3, following the entry from Lithuania and before the entry from Finland.

Aliona Moon once again took part in dress rehearsals on 17 and 18 May before the final, including the jury final where the professional juries cast their final votes before the live show. Moon performed a repeat of her semi-final performance during the final on 18 May. At the conclusion of the voting, Moldova finished in eleventh place with 71 points.

=== Voting ===
Voting during the three shows consisted of 50 percent public televoting and 50 percent from a jury deliberation. The jury consisted of five music industry professionals who were citizens of the country they represent, with their names published before the contest to ensure transparency. This jury was asked to judge each contestant based on: vocal capacity; the stage performance; the song's composition and originality; and the overall impression by the act. In addition, no member of a national jury could be related in any way to any of the competing acts in such a way that they cannot vote impartially and independently. The individual rankings of each jury member were released shortly after the grand final. The following members comprised the Moldovan jury: Liviu Ştirbu, Adrian Beldiman, Vitalie Rotaru, Larisa Zubcu and Vlad Mircos.

Following the release of the full split voting by the EBU after the conclusion of the competition, it was revealed that Moldova had placed eleventh with the public televote and third with the jury vote in the semi-final. In the public vote, Moldova received an average rank of 8.28, while with the jury vote, Moldova received an average rank of 4.32. In the final, Moldova had placed nineteenth with the public televote and fifth with the jury vote. In the public vote, Moldova received an average rank of 16.57, while with the jury vote, Moldova received an average rank of 8.69.

Below is a breakdown of points awarded to Moldova and awarded by Moldova in the first semi-final and grand final of the contest. The nation awarded its 12 points to Ukraine in the semi-final and the final of the contest.

==== Points awarded to Moldova ====
Points awarded to Moldova (Semi-final 1)
Score	Country
12 points	Russia
10 points	Ukraine
8 points	Italy
7 points	Austria; Serbia; Slovenia
6 points	Belarus; Denmark; Netherlands
5 points	Belgium; Cyprus; Sweden
4 points	Montenegro
3 points	Estonia; Lithuania
2 points	
1 point	Croatia

Points awarded to Moldova (Final)
Score	Country
12 points	Romania
10 points	
8 points	Ukraine
7 points	Macedonia
6 points	Russia; Serbia
5 points	Montenegro
4 points	Belarus; France; Italy
3 points	Belgium; Bulgaria; Ireland
2 points	Austria; Spain
1 point	Azerbaijan; Israel

==== Points awarded by Moldova ====
Points awarded by Moldova (Semi-final 1)
Score	Country
12 points	Ukraine
10 points	Belarus
8 points	Russia
7 points	Denmark
6 points	Montenegro
5 points	Estonia
4 points	Belgium
3 points	Austria
2 points	Lithuania
1 point	Ireland

Points awarded by Moldova (Final)
Score	Country
12 points	Ukraine
10 points	Romania
8 points	Azerbaijan
7 points	Russia
6 points	Denmark
5 points	Sweden
4 points	Belarus
3 points	Georgia
2 points	Norway
1 point	Armenia
