= Belgium in the Eurovision Song Contest 2013 =

- Eurovision Song Contest 2013
- Participating broadcaster: Radio-télévision belge de la Communauté française (RTBF)
- Country: Belgium
- Selection process: Artist: Internal selection Song: Eurovision 2013: À vous de choisir la chanson !
- Selection date: Artist: 16 November 2012; Song: 16 December 2012

Competing entry
- Song: "Love Kills"
- Artist: Roberto Bellarosa
- Songwriters: Jukka Immonen; Iain James

Placement
- Semi-final result: Qualified (5th, 75 points)
- Final result: 12th, 71 points

Participation chronology

Belgium was represented at the Eurovision Song Contest 2013 with the song "Love Kills", written by Jukka Immonen and Iain James, and performed by Roberto Bellarosa. The Belgian participating broadcaster, Walloon Radio-télévision belge de la Communauté française (RTBF), selected its entry for the contest through the national final Eurovision 2013: À vous de choisir la chanson !, after having previously selected the performer internally. The national final, held on 16 December 2012, featured three songs, and "Love Kills" was selected as the winning song via the votes of an expert jury and a public televote.

Belgium was drawn to compete in the first semi-final of the Eurovision Song Contest which took place on 14 May 2013. Performing during the show in position 15, "Love Kills" was announced among the top 10 entries of the first semi-final and therefore qualified to compete in the final on 18 May. It was later revealed that Belgium placed fifth out of the 16 participating countries in the semi-final with 75 points. In the final, Belgium performed in position 6 and placed twelfth out of the 26 participating countries, scoring 71 points.

== Background ==
Prior to the 2013 contest, Belgium had participated in the Eurovision Song Contest fifty-four times since its debut as one of seven countries to take part in 1956. Since then, the country has won the contest on one occasion in 1986 with the song "J'aime la vie" performed by Sandra Kim. Following the introduction of semi-finals for the 2004 contest, Belgium had been featured in only two finals. In 2012, "Would You?" performed by Iris placed seventeenth in the first semi-final and failed to advance to the final.

The Belgian participation in the contest alternates between two broadcasters: Flemish Vlaamse Radio- en Televisieomroeporganisatie (VRT) and Walloon Radio-télévision belge de la Communauté française (RTBF) at the time, with both broadcasters sharing the broadcasting rights. Both broadcasters –and their predecessors– have selected the Belgian entry using national finals and internal selections in the past. In 2011, RTBF organised a national final in order to select the Belgian entry, while in 2012, VRT internally selected an artist and organised the national final Eurosong in order to select the song. On 17 September 2012, RTBF confirmed its participation in the 2013 contest, internally selecting the artist while selecting the song via a national final.

== Before Eurovision ==
=== Artist selection ===
On 16 November 2012, RTBF announced that they had selected Roberto Bellarosa to represent Belgium at the Eurovision Song Contest 2013. Bellarosa was the winner of the first series of the reality singing competition The Voice Belgique. On 20 November 2012, the broadcaster held a press conference where it was revealed that the song he would perform at the contest would be selected through a three-song national selection.

=== Eurovision 2013: A vous de choisir la chanson! ===
Three songs were selected for the national final from six submitted by Roberto Bellarosa's record company Sony Music Entertainment and were announced on 11 December 2012. The final took place on 16 December 2012 at the VivaCité studios in Brussels, hosted by Jean-Louis Lahaye and was broadcast via radio on VivaCité as well as online at the broadcaster's website rtbf.be. All three competing songs were performed by Roberto Bellarosa and the combination of results from an expert jury and a public televote selected "Love Kills" as the winning song. It is unknown how the other two songs placed as the results from the jury were never announced.

Final – 16 December 2012
R/O	Song	Songwriter(s)	Televote		Place
R/O	Song	Songwriter(s)	Percentage	Points	Place
1	"Love Kills"	Andreas Anastasiou, Jukka Immonen, Iain James	56.12%	12	1
2	"Reste toi"	Jérémy Chapron	27.66%	10	—N/a
3	"Be Heroes"	Stephen "Beanz" Rudden	16.22%	8	—N/a

=== Preparation ===
In early February 2013, Roberto Bellarosa traveled to Finland to work with the co-composer of "Love Kills" Jukka Immonen and record the final Eurovision version of the song. The new version premiered on 12 March on VivaCité, while the music video for the song was released to the public on 15 March.

=== Promotion ===
Roberto Bellarosa specifically promoted "Love Kills" as the Belgian Eurovision entry on 13 April 2013 by performing during the Eurovision in Concert event which was held at the Melkweg venue in Amsterdam, Netherlands and hosted by Marlayne and Linda Wagenmakers.

== At Eurovision ==
According to Eurovision rules, all nations with the exceptions of the host country and the "Big Five" (France, Germany, Italy, Spain and the United Kingdom) are required to qualify from one of two semi-finals in order to compete for the final; the top ten countries from each semi-final progress to the final. The European Broadcasting Union (EBU) split up the competing countries into six different pots based on voting patterns from previous contests, with countries with favourable voting histories put into the same pot. On 17 January 2013, a special allocation draw was held which placed each country into one of the two semi-finals, as well as which half of the show they would perform in. Belgium was placed into the first semi-final, to be held on 14 May 2013, and was scheduled to perform in the second half of the show.

Once all the competing songs for the 2013 contest had been released, the running order for the semi-finals was decided by the shows' producers rather than through another draw, so that similar songs were not placed next to each other. Belgium was set to perform in position 15, following the entry from Cyprus and before the entry from Serbia.

The two semi-finals and the final was broadcast in Belgium by both the Flemish and Walloon broadcasters. VRT broadcast the shows on één and Radio 2 with commentary in Dutch by André Vermeulen and Tom De Cock. RTBF televised the shows on La Une with commentary in French by Jean-Louis Lahaye and Maureen Louys. The Belgian spokesperson, who announced the Belgian votes during the final, was Barbara Louys.

=== Semi-final ===
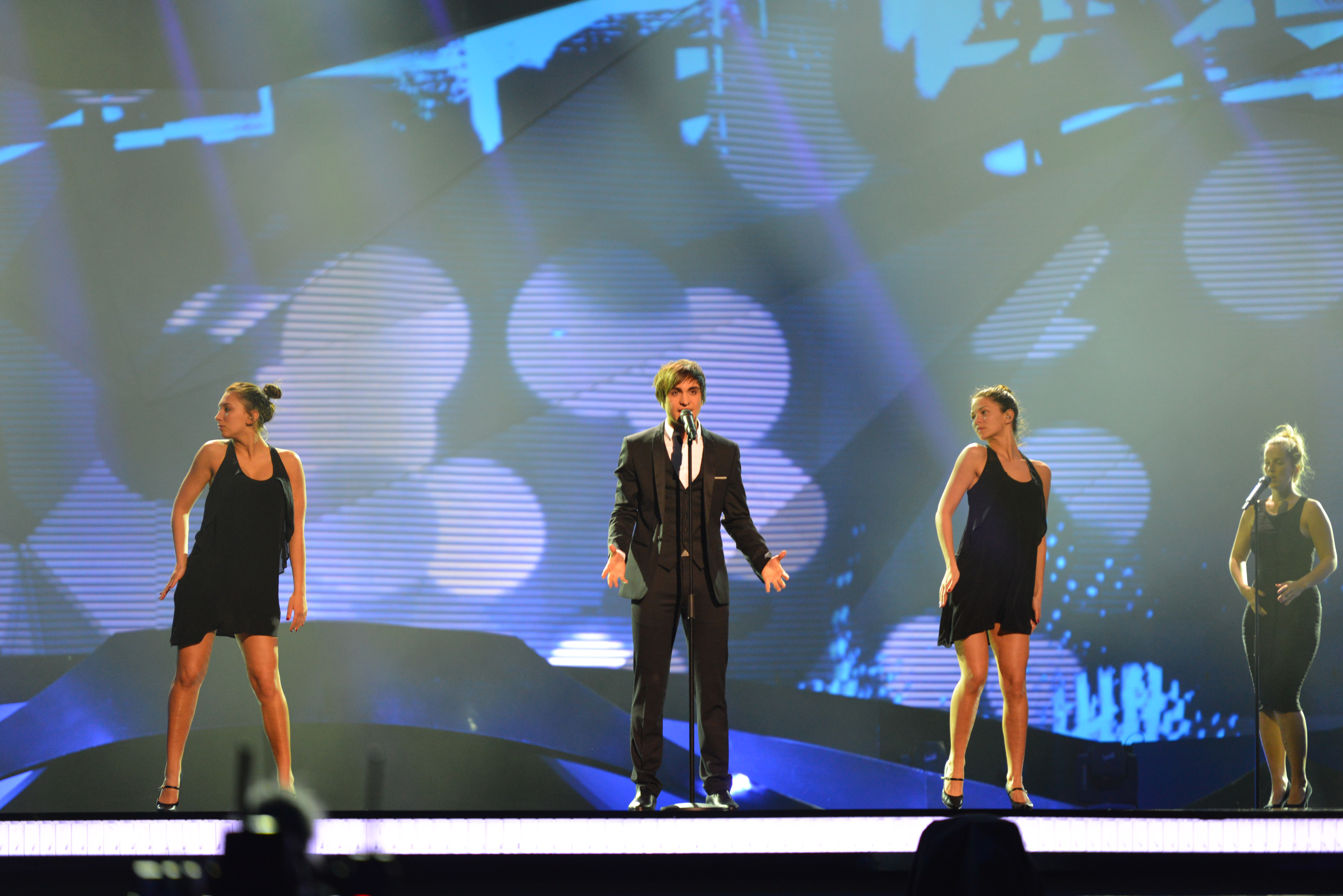
Roberto Bellarosa during a rehearsal before the first semi-final

Roberto Bellarosa took part in technical rehearsals on 7 and 10 May, followed by dress rehearsals on 13 and 14 May. This included the jury show on 13 May where the professional juries of each country watched and voted on the competing entries.

The Belgian performance featured Roberto Bellarosa in a black suit with white shirt and performing on stage together with two dancers who were in thigh high black dresses as well as three backing vocalists. The stage colours were in blue and purple and lyrics of the song were projected onto the rear screen. The performance also featured the use of shards that were lowered from the stage rigging. The dancers that join Roberto Bellarosa during the performance were Cassandra Markopoulos and Manelle Jebira, while the backing vocalists were: Ivann Vermeer, Magali David and Virginie Luypaerts.

At the end of the show, Belgium was announced as having finished in the top 10 and subsequently qualifying for the grand final. It was later revealed that Belgium placed fifth in the semi-final, receiving a total of 75 points.

=== Final ===
Shortly after the first semi-final, a winners' press conference was held for the ten qualifying countries. As part of this press conference, the qualifying artists took part in a draw to determine which half of the grand final they would subsequently participate in. This draw was done in the order the countries appeared in the semi-final running order. Belgium was drawn to compete in the first half. Following this draw, the shows' producers decided upon the running order of the final, as they had done for the semi-finals. Belgium was subsequently placed to perform in position 6, following the entry from Spain and before the entry from Estonia.

Roberto Bellarosa once again took part in dress rehearsals on 17 and 18 May before the final, including the jury final where the professional juries cast their final votes before the live show. Roberto Bellarosa performed a repeat of his semi-final performance during the final on 18 May. At the conclusion of the voting, Belgium finished in twelfth place with 71 points.

=== Voting ===
Voting during the three shows consisted of 50 percent public televoting and 50 percent from a jury deliberation. The jury consisted of five music industry professionals who were citizens of the country they represent. This jury was asked to judge each contestant based on: vocal capacity; the stage performance; the song's composition and originality; and the overall impression by the act. In addition, no member of a national jury could be related in any way to any of the competing acts in such a way that they cannot vote impartially and independently.

Following the release of the full split voting by the EBU after the conclusion of the competition, it was revealed that Belgium had placed seventh with both the public televote and the jury vote in the semi-final. In the public vote, Belgium received an average rank of 7.72, while with the jury vote, Belgium received an average rank of 6.63. In the final, Belgium had placed seventeenth with the public televote and eleventh with the jury vote. In the public vote, Belgium received an average rank of 16.03, while with the jury vote, Belgium received an average rank of 9.92.

Below is a breakdown of points awarded to Belgium and awarded by Belgium in the first semi-final and grand final of the contest. The nation awarded its 12 points to the Netherlands in the semi-final and the final of the contest.

==== Points awarded to Belgium ====
Points awarded to Belgium (Semi-final 1)
Score	Country
12 points	
10 points	Netherlands
8 points	Estonia; Russia
7 points	Denmark; Ireland; Sweden
6 points	Slovenia
5 points	United Kingdom
4 points	Austria; Moldova
3 points	Belarus; Croatia
2 points	Lithuania
1 point	Montenegro

Points awarded to Belgium (Final)
Score	Country
12 points	Netherlands
10 points	
8 points	Russia
7 points	Sweden
6 points	
5 points	Denmark; France; San Marino
4 points	Hungary; Ireland
3 points	Austria; Finland; Norway; Serbia; United Kingdom
2 points	Estonia; Latvia; Slovenia
1 point	

==== Points awarded by Belgium ====
Points awarded by Belgium (Semi-final 1)
Score	Country
12 points	Netherlands
10 points	Denmark
8 points	Ukraine
7 points	Russia
6 points	Lithuania
5 points	Moldova
4 points	Ireland
3 points	Austria
2 points	Cyprus
1 point	Estonia

Points awarded by Belgium (Final)
Score	Country
12 points	Netherlands
10 points	Denmark
8 points	Ukraine
7 points	Norway
6 points	Italy
5 points	Azerbaijan
4 points	Russia
3 points	Moldova
2 points	Greece
1 point	Sweden
