= Austria in the Eurovision Song Contest 2013 =

- Eurovision Song Contest 2013
- Participating broadcaster: Österreichischer Rundfunk (ORF)
- Country: Austria
- Selection process: Österreich rockt den Song Contest
- Selection date: 15 February 2013

Competing entry
- Song: "Shine"
- Artist: Natália Kelly
- Songwriters: Andreas Grass; Nikola Paryla; Alexander Kahr; Natália Kelly

Placement
- Semi-final result: Failed to qualify (14th)

Participation chronology

Austria was represented at the Eurovision Song Contest 2013 with the song "Shine" written by Andreas Grass, Nikola Paryla, Natália Kelly and Alexander Kahr, and performed by Natália Kelly. The Austrian participating broadcaster, Österreichischer Rundfunk (ORF), organised the national final Österreich rockt den Song Contest in order to select its entry for the contest. Five songs competed in a televised show where an international jury panel and a public vote selected "Shine" performed by Natália Kelly as the winner.

Austria was drawn to compete in the first semi-final of the Eurovision Song Contest which took place on 14 May 2013. Performing as the opening entry for the show in position 1, "Shine" was not announced among the top 10 entries of the first semi-final and therefore did not qualify to compete in the final. It was later revealed that Austria placed fourteenth out of the 16 participating countries in the semi-final with 27 points.

== Background ==
Prior to the 2013 contest, Austria has participated in the Eurovision Song Contest forty-five times since its first entry in 1957. The nation has won the contest on one occasion: in 1966 with the song "Merci, Chérie" performed by Udo Jürgens. Following the introduction of semi-finals for the 2004 contest, Austria has featured in only two finals. Austria's least successful result has been last place, which they have achieved on eight occasions, most recently in 2012. Austria has also received nul points on three occasions; in 1962, 1988 and 1991.

The Austrian national broadcaster, Österreichischer Rundfunk (ORF), broadcasts the event within Austria and organises the selection process for the nation's entry. ORF confirmed their intentions to participate at the 2013 Eurovision Song Contest on 12 September 2012. From 2002 to 2005, ORF set up public national finals with several artists to choose both the song and performer to compete at Eurovision for Austria. For the 2007 Eurovision Song Contest, ORF held an internal selection to choose the artist and song to represent Austria at the contest. In 2011 to 2012, the broadcaster returned to selecting the Austrian entry through a national final. On 1 October 2012, the broadcaster announced that the Austrian entry for the 2013 contest would be selected through a national final.

== Before Eurovision ==
=== Österreich rockt den Song Contest ===
Österreich rockt den Song Contest (Austria rocks the Song Contest) was the national final that selected Austria's entry for the Eurovision Song Contest 2013. The competition took place on 15 January 2013 at the ORF Center in Vienna, hosted by Mirjam Weichselbraun and Andi Knoll and broadcast on ORF eins as well as streamed online via ORF's official website and the official Eurovision Song Contest website eurovision.tv. The first part of the national final was watched by 297,000 viewers in Austria with a market share of 11%, while the second part was watched by 488,000 viewers in Austria.

==== Format ====
Five songs competed in the competition where the winner was selected by public voting and a five-member international jury. The sum of all the jury scores created a total score from which points were distributed based on the percentage of votes each song achieved. For example, if a song gained 10% of the jury vote, then that entry would be awarded 10 points. Viewers were able to vote via telephone or SMS and scores were also assigned based on the percentage of votes each song achieved.

The members of the international panel were:

- Marija Šerifović (Serbia) – singer, winner of the Eurovision Song Contest 2007
- Shay Byrne (Ireland) – radio presenter
- Gerd Gebhardt (Germany) – music producer, co-founder of the Echo Music Prize
- Luke Fisher (United Kingdom) – chief editor of the Eurovision website escxtra.com
- Anton Zetterholm (Sweden) – musical actor

==== Competing entries ====
ORF invited all interested artists to submit their songs to the broadcaster between 2 October 2012 and 31 October 2012. Artists were also able to apply without a song but were required to submit a cover version of another song. The received submissions were reviewed by the ORF editorial team, which collaborated with music experts Thomas Rabitsch, Ralf Strobl and Anja Rabitsch in order to select five entries to compete in the national final. The five artists were revealed on 11 December 2012 during the radio show Ö3-Wecker, aired on Ö3, while the presentation of the songs took place on 11 December 2012 at an ORF press conference as well as during Ö3-Wecker.

Artist	Song	Songwriter(s)
The Bandaloop	"Back to Fantasy"	Barca Baxant, Justin Case
Elija	"Give Me a Sign"	Elija Kulmer
Falco Luneau	"Rise Above the Night"	Falco Luneau, Tony Cornelissen
Natália Kelly	"Shine"	Andreas Grass, Nikola Paryla, Natália Kelly, Alexander Kahr
Yela	"Feels Like Home"	Daniela Bauer, Lukas Hillebrand, Alexander Pohn

==== Final ====
The televised final took place on 15 January 2013. Five songs competed where the combination of votes from an international jury panel and a public vote selected "Shine" performed by Natália Kelly as the winner. In addition to the performances of the competing entries, each of the artists performed a cover version of a past Eurovision Song Contest winning song.

Final – 15 January 2013
R/O	Artist	Song	Cover (Original artists)	Jury	Televote	Total	Place
1	Falco Luneau	"Rise Above the Night"	"What's Another Year" (Johnny Logan)	24	25	49	3
2	Yela	"Feels Like Home"	"Love Shine a Light" (Katrina and the Waves)	34	16	50	2
3	Elija	"Give Me a Sign"	"Euphoria" (Loreen)	6	10	16	4
4	Natália Kelly	"Shine"	"Ne partez pas sans moi" (Celine Dion)	32	38	70	1
5	The Bandaloop	"Back to Fantasy"	"Waterloo" (ABBA)	4	11	15	5

=== Promotion ===
Natália Kelly made several appearances across Europe to specifically promote "Shine" as the Austrian Eurovision entry. On 13 April, Kelly performed during the Eurovision in Concert event which was held at the Melkweg venue in Amsterdam, Netherlands and hosted by Marlayne and Linda Wagenmakers. On 21 April, Kelly performed during the London Eurovision Party, which was held at the Café de Paris venue in London, United Kingdom and hosted by Nicki French and Paddy O'Connell.

In addition to her international appearances, Natália Kelly performed "Shine" during the ORF eins programmes Willkommen Österreich mit Stermann & Grissemann and Dancing Stars as a musical guest on 30 April and 1 May, respectively. Earlier on 24 April, a farewell party was held for Kelly before she travelled to Malmö for the contest, which was held at the 25 Hours Hotel in Vienna.

== At Eurovision ==
According to Eurovision rules, all nations with the exceptions of the host country and the "Big Five" (France, Germany, Italy, Spain and the United Kingdom) are required to qualify from one of two semi-finals in order to compete for the final; the top ten countries from each semi-final progress to the final. The European Broadcasting Union (EBU) split up the competing countries into six different pots based on voting patterns from previous contests, with countries with favourable voting histories put into the same pot. On 17 January 2013, a special allocation draw was held which placed each country into one of the two semi-finals, as well as which half of the show they would perform in. Austria was placed into the first semi-final, to be held on 14 May 2013, and was scheduled to perform in the first half of the show.

Once all the competing songs for the 2013 contest had been released, the running order for the semi-finals was decided by the shows' producers rather than through another draw, so that similar songs were not placed next to each other. Austria was set to open the show and perform in position 1, before the entry from Estonia.

The two semi-finals and the final were broadcast in Austria on ORF eins with commentary by Andi Knoll. The Austrian spokesperson, who announced the Austrian votes during the final, was Kati Bellowitsch.

=== Final ===
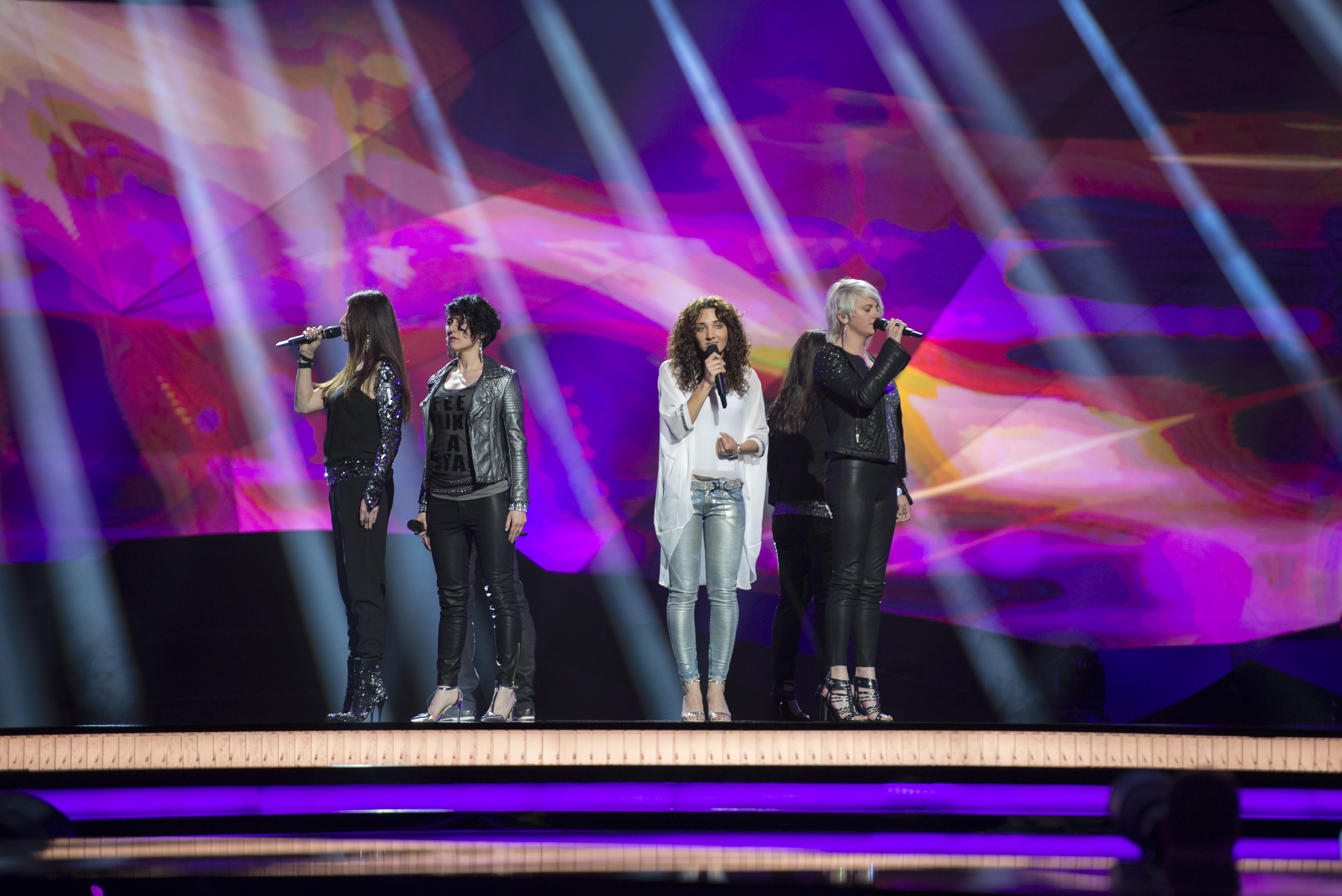
Natália Kelly during a rehearsal before the first semi-final

Natália Kelly took part in technical rehearsals on 3 and 6 May, followed by dress rehearsals on 9 and 10 May. This included the jury show on 9 May where the professional juries of each country watched and voted on the competing entries.

The Austrian performance featured Natália Kelly performing on stage in jeans and a white silk chiffon blouse decorated with rose, silver and metallic rhinestones with purple and pink colours appearing on the background. Towards the end of the song, the shards hanging from the ceiling were lifted. Natália Kelly was joined by five backing vocalists on stage: Karin Bauer, Regina Mallinger, Birgit Kubica, Harald Baumgartner and Monika Ballwein.

At the end of the show, Austria was not announced among the top 10 entries in the first semi-final and therefore failed to qualify to compete in the final. It was later revealed that Austria placed fourteenth in the semi-final, receiving a total of 27 points.

=== Voting ===
Voting during the three shows consisted of 50 percent public televoting and 50 percent from a jury deliberation. The jury consisted of five music industry professionals who were citizens of the country they represent. This jury was asked to judge each contestant based on: vocal capacity; the stage performance; the song's composition and originality; and the overall impression by the act. In addition, no member of a national jury could be related in any way to any of the competing acts in such a way that they cannot vote impartially and independently.

Following the release of the full split voting by the EBU after the conclusion of the competition, it was revealed that Austria had placed fifteenth with the public televote and fifth with the jury vote in the first semi-final. In the public vote, Austria received an average rank of 12.33, while with the jury vote, Austria received an average rank of 6.32.

Below is a breakdown of points awarded to Austria and awarded by Austria in the first semi-final and grand final of the contest. The nation awarded its 12 points to Denmark in the semi-final and to Azerbaijan in the final of the contest.

==== Points awarded to Austria ====
Points awarded to Austria (Semi-final 1)
Score	Country
12 points	
10 points	
8 points	
7 points	
6 points	
5 points	
4 points	Croatia; Denmark; Ireland
3 points	Belgium; Moldova
2 points	Cyprus; Italy; Serbia
1 point	Estonia; Slovenia; United Kingdom

==== Points awarded by Austria ====
Points awarded by Austria (Semi-final 1)
Score	Country
12 points	Denmark
10 points	Russia
8 points	Netherlands
7 points	Moldova
6 points	Serbia
5 points	Croatia
4 points	Belgium
3 points	Estonia
2 points	Ukraine
1 point	Cyprus

Points awarded by Austria (Final)
Score	Country
12 points	Azerbaijan
10 points	Italy
8 points	Netherlands
7 points	Greece
6 points	Germany
5 points	Denmark
4 points	Romania
3 points	Belgium
2 points	Moldova
1 point	Ukraine
