= Estonia in the Eurovision Song Contest 2013 =

- Eurovision Song Contest 2013
- Participating broadcaster: Eesti Rahvusringhääling (ERR)
- Country: Estonia
- Selection process: Eesti Laul 2013
- Selection date: 2 March 2013

Competing entry
- Song: "Et uus saaks alguse"
- Artist: Birgit
- Songwriters: Mihkel Mattisen; Silvia Soro

Placement
- Semi-final result: Qualified (10th, 52 points)
- Final result: 20th, 19 points

Participation chronology

Estonia was represented at the Eurovision Song Contest 2013 with the song "Et uus saaks alguse" written by Mihkel Mattisen and Silvia Soro. The song was performed by Birgit. The Estonian broadcaster Eesti Rahvusringhääling (ERR) organised the national final Eesti Laul 2013 in order to select the Estonian entry for the 2013 contest in Malmö, Sweden. The competition featured three rounds: two semi-finals and a final. In each semi-final, ten songs competed, with the top five, as determined by a jury panel and public vote, advancing to the final. The final winner was chosen over two rounds of voting. Initially, a jury panel and public vote selected the top five to proceed to the superfinal. Ultimately, "Et uus saaks alguse" was selected as the winner by a public vote.

Estonia was drawn to compete in the first semi-final of the Eurovision Song Contest which took place on 14 May 2013. Performing during the show in position 2, "Et uus saaks alguse" was announced among the top 10 entries of the first semi-final and therefore qualified to compete in the final on 18 May. It was later revealed that Estonia placed tenth out of the 16 participating countries in the semi-final with 52 points. In the final, Estonia performed in position 7 and placed twentieth out of the 26 participating countries, scoring 19 points.

== Background ==
Prior to the 2013 contest, Estonia had participated in the Eurovision Song Contest eighteen times since its first entry in 1994, winning the contest on one occasion in 2001 with the song "Everybody" performed by Tanel Padar, Dave Benton and 2XL. Following the introduction of semi-finals for the 2004, Estonia has, to this point, managed to qualify to the final on three occasions. In 2012, "Kuula" performed by Ott Lepland managed to qualify Estonia to the final where the song placed sixth.

The Estonian national broadcaster, Eesti Rahvusringhääling (ERR), broadcasts the event within Estonia and organises the selection process for the nation's entry. ERR confirmed Estonia's participation at the 2013 Eurovision Song Contest on 28 May 2012. Since their debut, the Estonian broadcaster has organised national finals that feature a competition among multiple artists and songs in order to select Estonia's entry for the Eurovision Song Contest. The Eesti Laul competition has been organised since 2009 in order to select Estonia's entry and on 12 September 2012, ERR announced the organisation of Eesti Laul 2013 in order to select the nation's 2013 entry.

== Before Eurovision ==
=== Eesti Laul 2013 ===
Eesti Laul 2013 was the fifth edition of the Estonian national selection Eesti Laul, which selected Estonia's entry for the Eurovision Song Contest 2013. The competition consisted of twenty entries competing in two semi-finals on 16 and 23 February 2013 leading to a ten-song final on 2 March 2013. All three shows were broadcast on Eesti Televisioon (ETV) as well as streamed online at the broadcaster's official website err.ee. The final was also broadcast via radio on Raadio 2 as well as streamed online at the official Eurovision Song Contest website eurovision.tv.

==== Format ====
The format of the competition included two semi-finals on 16 and 23 February 2013 and a final on 2 March 2013. Ten songs competed in each semi-final and the top five from each semi-final qualified to complete the ten song lineup in the final. The results of the semi-finals was determined by the 50/50 combination of votes from a professional jury and public televoting. The winning song in the final was selected over two rounds of voting: the first round results selected the top two songs via the 50/50 combination of jury and public voting, while the second round (superfinal) determined the winner solely by public televoting.

==== Competing entries ====
On 12 September 2012, ERR opened the submission period for artists and composers to submit their entries up until 10 December 2012. All artists and composers were required to have Estonian citizenship or be a permanent resident of Estonia. 157 submissions were received by the deadline. An 11-member jury panel selected 20 semi-finalists from the submissions and the selected songs were announced during the ETV entertainment program Ringvaade on 13 December 2012. The selection jury consisted of Owe Petersell (Raadio Elmar chief editor), Lenna Kuurmaa (singer), Erik Morna (Raadio 2 head of music), Alari Kivisaar (Raadio Sky+ program director), Valner Valme (music critic), Ingrid Kohtla (Tallinn Music Week organiser), Siim Nestor (music critic), Koit Raudsepp (Raadio 2 presenter), Maiken (singer), Tauno Aints (composer) and Kaupo Karelson (television producer).

Birgit Õigemeel, Jaan Pehk (member of Kõrsikud), Marilyn Jurman, Rolf Roosalu, Rosanna Lints, Teele Viira and Tenfold Rabbit have all competed in previous editions of Eesti Laul. On 17 December 2012, "Miljoni roosiga kaardi sul saadan", written by Marek Sadam and Peeter Kaljuste and to have been performed by Tauri was disqualified from the competition due to plagiarism and replaced with the song "Young Girl" performed by Armastus. Plagiarism accusations were also launched against the song "Meil on aega veel" performed by Põhja-Tallinn which ERR later declared false.

Artist	Song	Songwriter(s)
Anisa	"The Missing Thing"	Alar Kotkas, Pearu Paulus, Ilmar Laisaar, Jana Hallas
Armastus	"Young Girl"	Jaan Tätte jr., Taavi Tulev
Birgit Õigemeel	"Et uus saaks alguse"	Mihkel Mattisen, Silvia Soro
Elina Born	"Enough"	Stig Rästa, Fred Krieger
Flank	"Missing Light"	Tõnn Tobreluts, Tauno Tamm, Keio Münti
Grete Paia	"Päästke noored hinged"	Grete Paia, Sven Lõhmus
Kõrsikud	"Suuda öelda ei"	Andrus Albrecht, Alari Piispea, Lauri Liivak, Jaan Pehk
Liis Lemsalu	"Uhhuu"	René Puura, Liis Lemsalu
Liisi Koikson and Söörömöö	"Üle vee"	Immi
Marie Vaigla	"Maybe"	Raul Vaigla, Marie Vaigla
Marilyn Jurman	"Moving to Mmm"	Marilyn Jurman, Karl Kanter
Neogeen	"Lune sournoise"	Raido Lilleberg, Kalle Raudmets, Mare Sabolotny
Põhja-Tallinn	"Meil on aega veel"	Jaanus Saks, Mark Eric Kammiste, Alvar-Risto Vürst
Rasmus Rändvee and Facelift Deer	"Dance"	Rasmus Rändvee, Paal Piller, Karl Kallas
Rolf Roosalu	"With U"	Rolf Roosalu
Rosanna Lints	"Follow Me"	Rolf Roosalu, Kristel Aaslaid, Mattias Hapsal
Sarah	"Taevas valgeks läeb"	Sirli Hiius, Mathura
Teele and Tuuli and Ula	"Ring the Alarm"	Priit Uustulnd, Teele Viira
Tenfold Rabbit	"Balance of Water & Stone"	Andres Kõpper, Meelik Samel, Martin Petermann
Winny Puhh	"Meiecundimees üks Korsakov läks eile Lätti"	Silver Lepaste, Indrek Vaheoja

==== Semi-finals ====
The two semi-finals took place on 16 and 23 February 2013. The first semi-final was hosted by Anu Välba, while the second semi-final was hosted by Marko Reikop. The live portion of the shows were held at the ERR studios in Tallinn where the artists awaited the results while their performances, which were filmed earlier at the ERR studios, were screened. In each semi-final ten songs competed for five spots in the final with the outcome decided upon by the combination of the votes from a jury panel and a public televote which registered 17,161 votes in the first semi-final and 23,831 votes in the second semi-final. The jury panel that voted in the semi-finals consisted of Lenna Kuurmaa, Valner Valme, Mart Niineste, Ithaka Maria, Owe Petersell, Kadri Voorand, Janek Murd, Olav Osolin, Kristo Rajasaare, Els Himma and Heini Vaikmaa.

Semi-final 1 – 16 February 2013
R/O	Artist	Song	Jury	Televote		Total	Place
R/O	Artist	Song	Jury	Votes	Points	Total	Place
1	Armastus	"Young Girl"	6	944	3	9	7
2	Marilyn Jurman	"Moving to Mmm"	3	693	2	5	9
3	Winny Puhh	"Meiecundimees üks Korsakov läks eile Lätti"	9	3,067	9	18	1
4	Sarah	"Taevas valgeks läeb"	1	379	1	2	10
5	Teele and Tuuli and Ula	"Ring the Alarm"	8	1,092	5	13	5
6	Rosanna Lints	"Follow Me"	4	1,696	6	10	6
7	Grete Paia	"Päästke noored hinged"	5	3,322	10	15	3
8	Elina Born	"Enough"	7	2,306	7	14	4
9	Kõrsikud	"Suuda öelda ei"	10	2,654	8	18	2
10	Anisa	"The Missing Thing"	2	1,008	4	6	8

Semi-final 2 – 23 February 2013
R/O	Artist	Song	Jury	Televote		Total	Place
R/O	Artist	Song	Jury	Votes	Points	Total	Place
1	Liisi Koikson and Söörömöö	"Üle vee"	8	1,731	4	12	3
2	Birgit Õigemeel	"Et uus saaks alguse"	2	3,682	9	11	5
3	Tenfold Rabbit	"Balance of Water & Stone"	10	1,001	1	11	8
4	Liis Lemsalu	"Uhhuu"	7	1,381	3	10	9
5	Marie Vaigla	"Maybe"	9	1,269	2	11	7
6	Rasmus Rändvee and Facelift Deer	"Dance"	5	2,519	7	12	2
7	Rolf Roosalu	"With U"	4	2,813	8	12	1
8	Flank	"Missing Light"	6	1,791	5	11	6
9	Neogeen	"Lune sournoise"	3	2,229	6	9	10
10	Põhja-Tallinn	"Meil on aega veel"	1	5,415	10	11	4

==== Final ====
The final took place on 2 March 2013 at the Nokia Concert Hall in Tallinn, hosted by Anu Välba and Marko Reikop. The five entries that qualified from each of the two preceding semi-finals, all together ten songs, competed during the show. The winner was selected over two rounds of voting. In the first round, a jury (50%) and public televote (50%) determined the top two entries to proceed to the superfinal. In the superfinal, "Et uus saaks alguse" performed by Birgit Õigemeel was selected as the winner entirely by a public televote. The public vote in the first round registered 60,284 votes, and the vote in the superfinal registered 59,347 votes. In addition to the performances of the competing entries, Tanel Padar, who represented Estonia in the Eurovision Song Contest 2001, with Ott Lepland, who represented Estonia in the Eurovision Song Contest 2012, and Jalmar Vabarna, and the bands HU? and Bombillaz performed as the interval acts. The jury panel that voted in the first round of the final consisted of Olav Ehala (maestro), Sandra Nurmsalu (musician), Marten Kuningas (singer), Tõnis Kahu (music critic), Toomas Puna (Raadio Sky+ program director), Sofia Rubina (singer), Owe Petersell (Raadio Elmar chief editor), Reigo Ahven (drummer), Marju Länik (singer), Toomas Olljum (music manager) and Erik Morna (Raadio 2 head of music).

Final – 2 March 2013
R/O	Artist	Song	Jury		Televote		Total	Place
R/O	Artist	Song	Votes	Points	Votes	Points	Total	Place
1	Rolf Roosalu	"With U"	55	4	3,973	3	7	9
2	Liisi Koikson and Söörömöö	"Üle vee"	75	8	2,593	2	10	5
3	Rasmus Rändvee and Facelift Deer	"Dance"	56	5	4,062	4	9	7
4	Elina Born	"Enough"	52	3	4,935	5	8	8
5	Põhja-Tallinn	"Meil on aega veel"	42	2	5,957	7	9	6
6	Kõrsikud	"Suuda öelda ei"	85	10	4,964	6	16	4
7	Birgit Õigemeel	"Et uus saaks alguse"	76	9	9,703	8	17	1
8	Teele and Tuuli and Ula	"Ring the Alarm"	34	1	2,005	1	2	10
9	Winny Puhh	"Meiecundimees üks Korsakov läks eile Lätti"	65	7	9,800	9	16	3
10	Grete Paia	"Päästke noored hinged"	65	6	12,292	10	16	2

Detailed Jury Votes
R/O	Song	O. Ehala	S. Nurmsalu	M. Kuningas	T. Kahu	T. Puna	S. Rubina	O. Petersell	R. Ahven	M. Länik	T. Olljum	E. Morna	Total
1	"With U"	7	5	8	7	1	5	9	1	4	1	7	55
2	"Üle vee"	9	6	5	6	2	10	10	10	8	6	3	75
3	"Dance"	3	1	1	9	5	4	7	6	5	9	6	56
4	"Enough"	4	4	3	4	7	3	6	4	7	8	2	52
5	"Meil on aega veel"	6	7	7	1	4	1	1	5	2	4	4	42
6	"Suuda öelda ei"	8	9	9	3	9	8	2	8	10	10	9	85
7	"Et uus saaks alguse"	10	10	6	5	6	9	4	7	9	5	5	76
8	"Ring the Alarm"	2	3	4	2	3	7	5	2	3	2	1	34
9	"Meiecundimees üks Korsakov läks eile Lätti"	1	2	10	8	8	6	3	9	1	7	10	65
10	"Päästke noored hinged"	5	8	2	10	10	2	8	3	6	3	8	65

Superfinal – 2 March 2013
R/O	Artist	Song	Televote	Place
1	Birgit Õigemeel	"Et uus saaks alguse"	30,333	1
2	Grete Paia	"Päästke noored hinged"	29,014	2

== At Eurovision ==
According to Eurovision rules, all nations with the exceptions of the host country and the "Big Five" (France, Germany, Italy, Spain and the United Kingdom) are required to qualify from one of two semi-finals in order to compete for the final; the top ten countries from each semi-final progress to the final. The European Broadcasting Union (EBU) split up the competing countries into six different pots based on voting patterns from previous contests, with countries with favourable voting histories put into the same pot. On 17 January 2013, an allocation draw was held which placed each country into one of the two semi-finals, as well as which half of the show they would perform in. Estonia was placed into the first semi-final, to be held on 14 May 2013, and was scheduled to perform in the first half of the show.

Once all the competing songs for the 2013 contest had been released, the running order for the semi-finals was decided by the shows' producers rather than through another draw, so that similar songs were not placed next to each other. Estonia was set to perform in position 2, following the entry from Austria and before the entry from Slovenia.

The two semi-finals and the final were broadcast in Estonia on ETV with commentary by Marko Reikop. The first semi-final and final were also broadcast via radio on Raadio 2 with commentary by Mart Juur and Andrus Kivirähk. The Estonian spokesperson, who announced the Estonian votes during the final, was Rolf Roosalu.

=== Semi-final ===
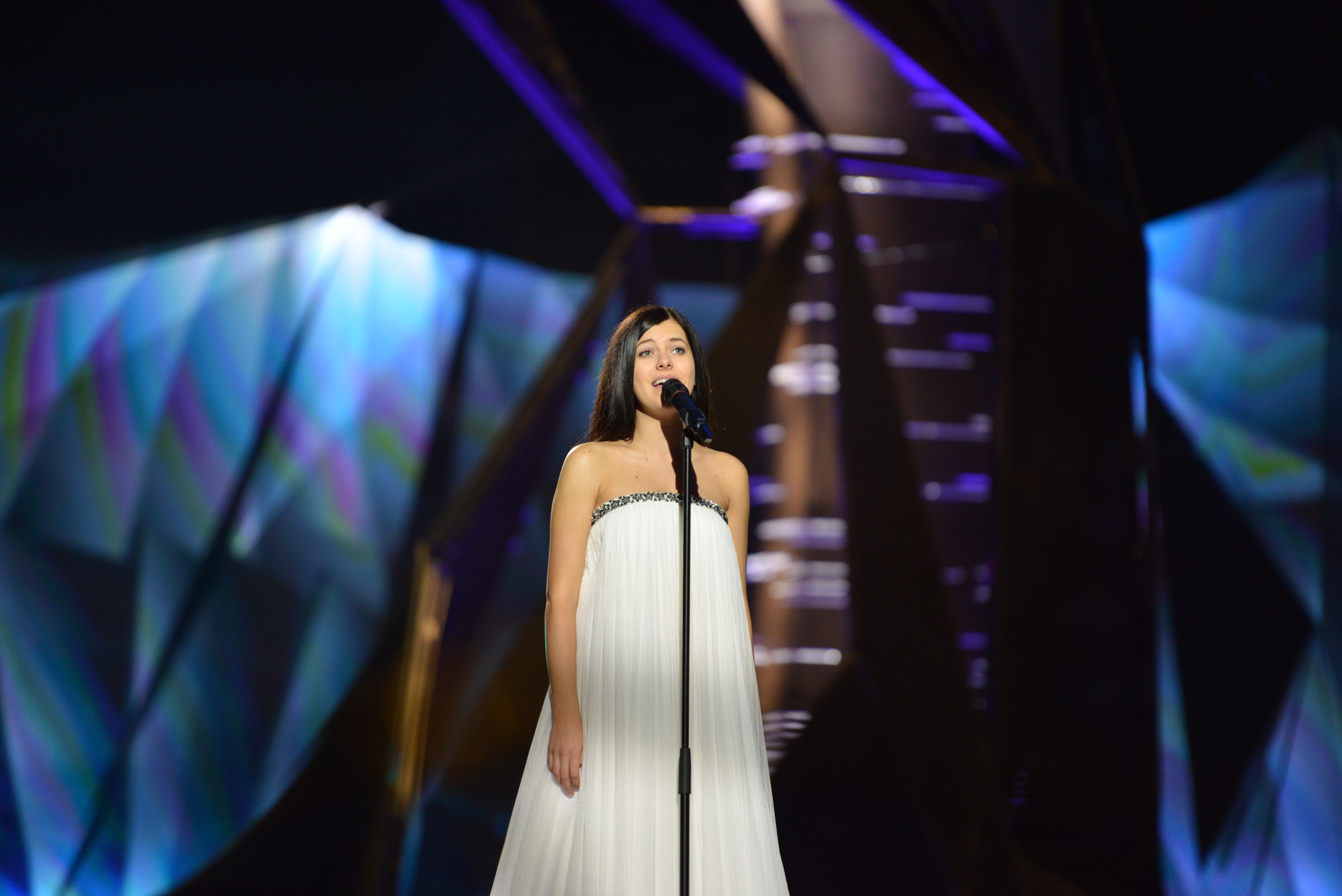
Birgit during a rehearsal before the first semi-final

Birgit took part in technical rehearsals on 6 and 10 May, followed by dress rehearsals on 13 and 14 May. This included the jury show on 13 May where the professional juries of each country watched and voted on the competing entries.

The Estonian performance featured Birgit performing on stage in a long flowing white dress with the stage projector displaying blue and white patterns before transforming to green colours. Birgit began the performance on the catwalk stage before walking back to the main stage. Birgit was joined by three backing vocalists: Lauri Pihlap, Kaido Põldma and Raimondo Laikre. Pihlap and Põldma had previously represented Estonia as members of 2XL in the Eurovision Song Contest in 2001 together with Tanel Padar and Dave Benton, which they won with the song "Everybody".

At the end of the show, Estonia was announced as having finished in the top 10 and subsequently qualifying for the grand final. It was later revealed that Estonia placed 10th in the semi-final, receiving a total of 52 points.

=== Final ===
Shortly after the first semi-final, a winners' press conference was held for the ten qualifying countries. As part of this press conference, the qualifying artists took part in a draw to determine which half of the grand final they would subsequently participate in. This draw was done in the order the countries appeared in the semi-final running order. Estonia was drawn to compete in the first half. Following this draw, the shows' producers decided upon the running order of the final, as they had done for the semi-finals. Estonia was subsequently placed to perform in position 7, following the entry from Belgium and before the entry from Belarus.

Birgit once again took part in dress rehearsals on 17 and 18 May before the final, including the jury final where the professional juries cast their final votes before the live show. Birgit performed a repeat of her semi-final performance during the final on 18 May. At the conclusion of the voting, Estonia finished in twentieth place with 19 points.

=== Voting ===
Voting during the three shows consisted of 50 percent public televoting and 50 percent from a jury deliberation. The jury consisted of five music industry professionals who were citizens of the country they represent. This jury was asked to judge each contestant based on: vocal capacity; the stage performance; the song's composition and originality; and the overall impression by the act. In addition, no member of a national jury could be related in any way to any of the competing acts in such a way that they cannot vote impartially and independently.

Following the release of the full split voting by the EBU after the conclusion of the competition, it was revealed that Estonia had placed thirteenth with the public televote and eighth with the jury vote in the semi-final. In the public vote, Estonia received an average rank of 10.06, while with the jury vote, Estonia received an average rank of 7.47. In the final, Estonia had placed twenty-fourth with the public televote and sixteenth with the jury vote. In the public vote, Estonia received an average rank of 19.59, while with the jury vote, Estonia received an average rank of 13.41.

Below is a breakdown of points awarded to Estonia and awarded by Estonia in the first semi-final and grand final of the contest. The nation awarded its 12 points to Denmark in the semi-final and to Russia in the final of the contest.

==== Points awarded to Estonia ====
Points awarded to Estonia (Semi-final 1)
Score	Country
12 points	
10 points	
8 points	Ireland
7 points	
6 points	Sweden
5 points	Belarus; Italy; Moldova; Russia
4 points	Lithuania; Netherlands; United Kingdom
3 points	Austria
2 points	
1 point	Belgium; Denmark; Ukraine

Points awarded to Estonia (Final)
Score	Country
12 points	
10 points	Latvia
8 points	
7 points	
6 points	Finland
5 points	
4 points	
3 points	Lithuania
2 points	
1 point	

==== Points awarded by Estonia ====
Points awarded by Estonia (Semi-final 1)
Score	Country
12 points	Denmark
10 points	Russia
8 points	Belgium
7 points	Netherlands
6 points	Ukraine
5 points	Ireland
4 points	Lithuania
3 points	Moldova
2 points	Cyprus
1 point	Austria

Points awarded by Estonia (Final)
Score	Country
12 points	Russia
10 points	Ukraine
8 points	Denmark
7 points	Netherlands
6 points	Iceland
5 points	Malta
4 points	Hungary
3 points	Norway
2 points	Belgium
1 point	Sweden
