= France in the Eurovision Song Contest 2013 =

- Eurovision Song Contest 2013
- Participating broadcaster: France Télévisions
- Country: France
- Selection process: Internal selection
- Announcement date: Artist: 22 January 2013; Song: 13 March 2013

Competing entry
- Song: "L'enfer et moi"
- Artist: Amandine Bourgeois
- Songwriters: Boris Bergman; David Salkin

Placement
- Final result: 23rd, 14 points

Participation chronology

France was represented at the Eurovision Song Contest 2013 with the song "L'enfer et moi" written by Boris Bergman and David Salkin, and performed by Amandine Bourgeois. The French broadcaster France Télévisions in collaboration with the television channel France 3 internally selected the French entry for the 2013 contest in Malmö, Sweden. "L'enfer et moi" was officially announced by France 3 as the French entry on 22 January 2013 and later the song was presented to the public as the contest entry on 13 March 2013.

As a member of the "Big Five", France automatically qualified to compete in the final of the Eurovision Song Contest. Performing as the opening entry during the show in position 1, France placed twenty-third out of the 26 participating countries with 14 points.

== Background ==
Prior to the 2013 Contest, France had participated in the Eurovision Song Contest fifty-five times since its debut as one of seven countries to take part in 1956. France first won the contest in 1958 with "Dors, mon amour" performed by André Claveau. In the 1960s, they won three times, with "Tom Pillibi" performed by Jacqueline Boyer in 1960, "Un premier amour" performed by Isabelle Aubret in 1962 and "Un jour, un enfant" performed by Frida Boccara, who won in 1969 in a four-way tie with the Netherlands, Spain and the United Kingdom. France's fifth victory came in 1977, when Marie Myriam won with the song "L'oiseau et l'enfant". France have also finished second four times, with Paule Desjardins in 1957, Catherine Ferry in 1976, Joëlle Ursull in 1990 and Amina in 1991, who lost out to Sweden's Carola in a tie-break. In the 21st century, France has had less success, only making the top ten three times, with Natasha St-Pier finishing fourth in 2001, Sandrine François finishing fifth in 2002 and Patricia Kaas finishing eighth in 2009. In 2012, the nation finished in twenty-second place with the song "Echo (You and I)" performed by Anggun.

The French national broadcaster, France Télévisions, broadcasts the event within France and delegates the selection of the nation's entry to the television channel France 3. France 3 confirmed that France would participate in the 2013 Eurovision Song Contest on 6 November 2012. The French broadcaster had used both national finals and internal selection to choose the French entry in the past. From 2008 to 2012, the broadcaster opted to internally select the French entry, a procedure that was continued in order to select the 2013 entry.

== Before Eurovision ==
=== Internal selection ===
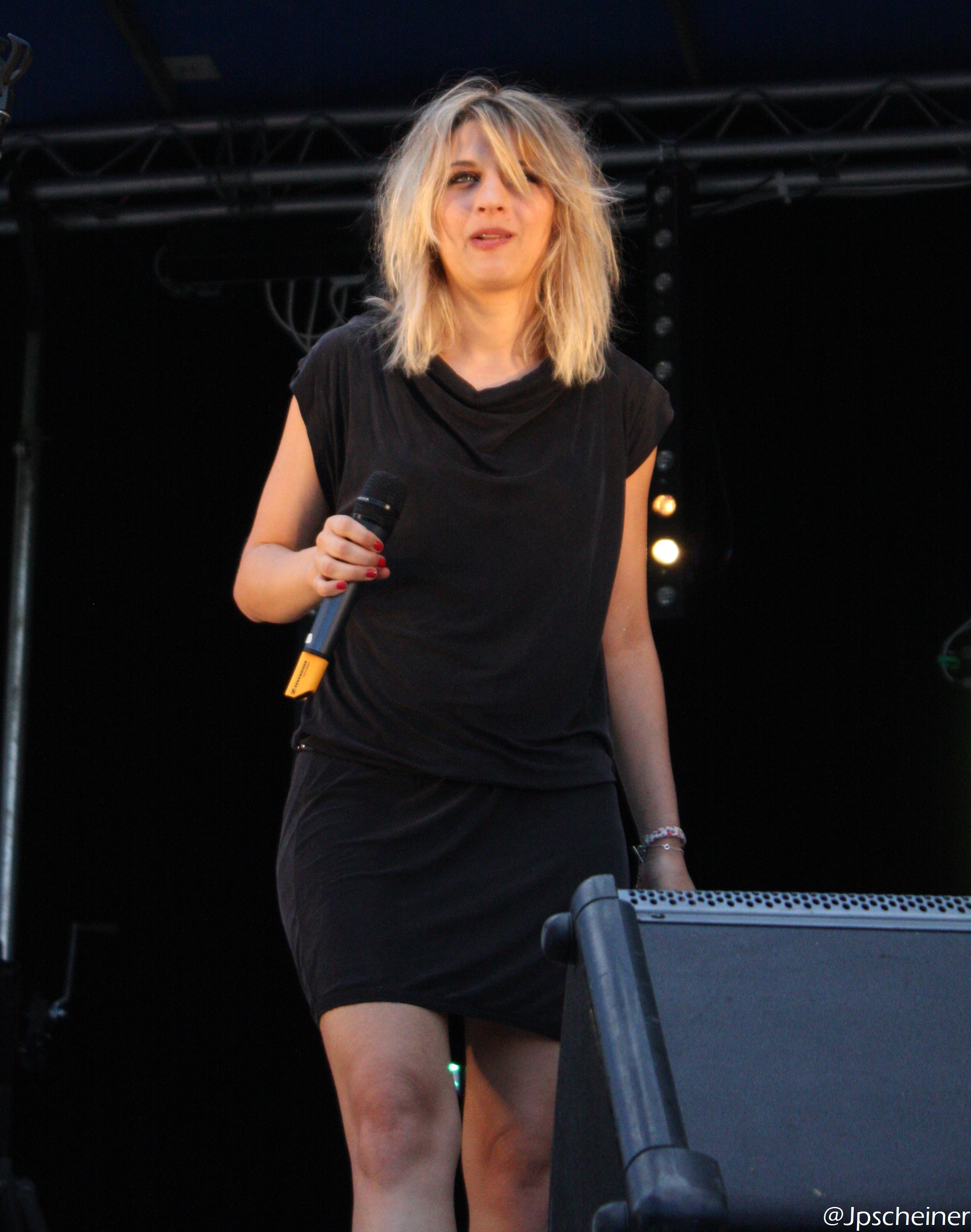
Amandine Bourgeois was internally selected to represent France in the Eurovision Song Contest 2013

France 3 announced in late 2012 that the French entry for the 2013 Eurovision Song Contest would be selected internally. The organisation of the internal selection was headed by the newly appointed French Head of Delegation for the Eurovision Song Contest Frédéric Valencak. The broadcaster received 150 submissions from record companies, music publishers, artist managers as well as artists and songwriters themselves and a five-member selection committee shortlisted 18 entries to advance to the next stage, which involved an alternate fourteen-member committee consisting of representatives of France Télévisions and music industry professionals that considered five entries following a blind audio listening before finalising their decision internally in early 2013. The members of the second selection committee were:

- Yvan Cassar – Arranger and conductor
- Élodie Hesme – Lyricist
- Jacques Veneruso – Composer and author
- Gérard Pont – Director of Francofolies
- Bertrand Habart – Editorial director of Deezer
- Virginie Borgeaud – Manager
- Bruno Berberes – Casting and artistic director
- Claude Bosle – Télé 7 Jours editor-in-chief
- Audrey Chauveau – France Ô representative
- Thierry Langlois – France 3 programmes director
- Julien Borde – France 3 general programmes secretary
- Yann Chapellon – France Télévisions president and distribution director
- Marie-Claire Mezerette – France 3 entertainment director
- Frédéric Valencak – Head of Delegation for France at the Eurovision Song Contest

On 22 January 2013, France 3 announced that the French entry for the Eurovision Song Contest 2013 would be "L'enfer et moi" performed by Amandine Bourgeois. The song was written by Boris Bergman and David Salkin. The entry was released on 13 March 2013 via the streaming service Spotify, and was formally presented to the public on 14 March 2013 during the France 5 programme C à vous, hosted by Alessandra Sublet.

== At Eurovision ==
Amandine Bourgeois presenting herself and "L'enfer et moi" at the Eurovision Song Contest 2013

According to Eurovision rules, all nations with the exceptions of the host country and the "Big Five" (France, Germany, Italy, Spain and the United Kingdom) are required to qualify from one of two semi-finals in order to compete for the final; the top ten countries from each semi-final progress to the final. As a member of the "Big 5", France automatically qualified to compete in the final on 18 May 2013. In addition to their participation in the final, France is also required to broadcast and vote in one of the two semi-finals. During the semi-final allocation draw on 17 January 2013, France was assigned to broadcast and vote in the second semi-final on 16 May 2013.

In France, the two semi-finals was broadcast on France Ô with commentary by Audrey Chauveau and Bruno Berberes, while the final was broadcast on France 3 with commentary by Cyril Féraud and Mireille Dumas. The French spokesperson, who announced the French votes during the final, was Marine Vignes.

=== Final ===
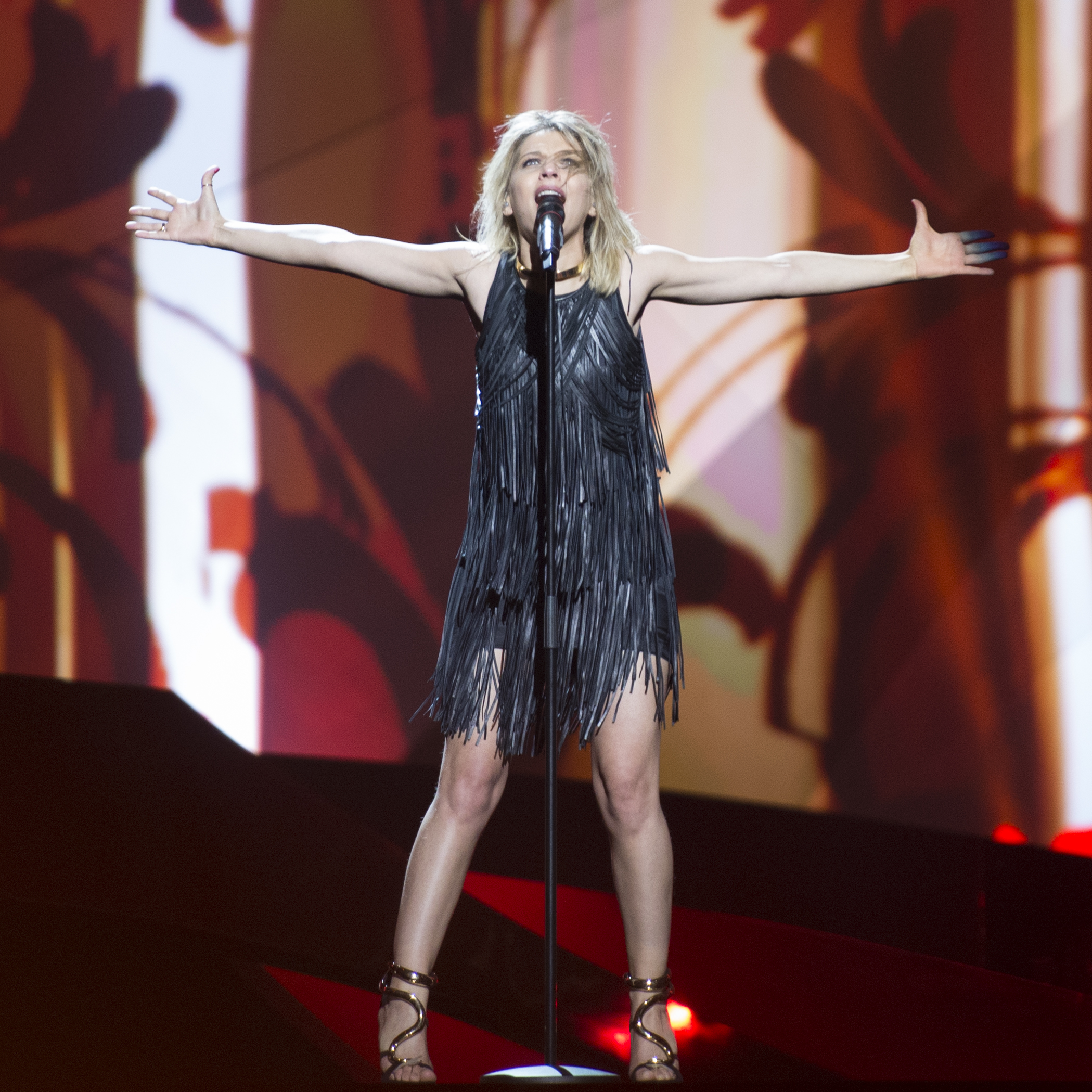
Amandine Bourgeois during a rehearsal before the final

Amandine Bourgeois took part in technical rehearsals on 12 and 15 May, followed by dress rehearsals on 17 and 18 May. This included the jury final on 17 May where the professional juries of each country watched and voted on the competing entries. After technical rehearsals were held on 15 May, the "Big 5" countries and host nation Denmark held a press conference. As part of this press conference, the artists took part in a draw to determine which half of the grand final they would subsequently participate in. France was drawn to compete in the first half. Following the conclusion of the second semi-final, the shows' producers decided upon the running order of the final. The running order for the semi-finals and final was decided by the shows' producers rather than through another draw, so that similar songs were not placed next to each other. France was subsequently placed to open the show and perform in position 1, before the entry from Lithuania.

The French performance featured Amandine Bourgeois on stage wearing a grey dress and black high heels designed by French designer Jean-Claude Jitrois and performing the song at a microphone stand. The stage colours were predominately red with red, yellow and orange lighting and the stage projections displayed flames and steam on a black background. About the performance and song, France 3 entertainment director Marie Claire Mezerette stated: "In this case simplicity is the key. It is a simple, but still powerful rock love song. We don't need to make it complicated. She wants to express how angry she is with what happened in that love story, Amandine is singing about." Amandine Bourgeois was joined on stage by three backing vocalists: Fanny Llado, Guillaume Eyango and Judith Flessel-Toto. France placed twenty-third in the final, scoring 23 points.

=== Voting ===
Voting during the three shows consisted of 50 percent public televoting and 50 percent from a jury deliberation. The jury consisted of five music industry professionals who were citizens of the country they represent, with their names published before the contest to ensure transparency. This jury was asked to judge each contestant based on: vocal capacity; the stage performance; the song's composition and originality; and the overall impression by the act. In addition, no member of a national jury could be related in any way to any of the competing acts in such a way that they cannot vote impartially and independently. The individual rankings of each jury member were released shortly after the grand final.

Following the release of the full split voting by the EBU after the conclusion of the competition, it was revealed that France had placed twenty-fifth with the public televote and twelfth with the jury vote. In the public vote, France received an average rank of 21.68 and in the jury vote the nation received an average rank of 10.95.

Below is a breakdown of points awarded to France and awarded by France in the second semi-final and grand final of the contest, and the breakdown of the jury voting and televoting conducted during the two shows:

==== Points awarded to France ====
Points awarded to France (Final)
Score	Country
12 points	
10 points	
8 points	San Marino
7 points	
6 points	
5 points	
4 points	
3 points	
2 points	Armenia; Iceland
1 point	Cyprus; Macedonia

==== Points awarded by France ====
Points awarded by France (Semi-final 2)
Score	Country
12 points	Armenia
10 points	Switzerland
8 points	Azerbaijan
7 points	Finland
6 points	Romania
5 points	San Marino
4 points	Israel
3 points	Hungary
2 points	Malta
1 point	Bulgaria

Points awarded by France (Final)
Score	Country
12 points	Denmark
10 points	Italy
8 points	Azerbaijan
7 points	Armenia
6 points	Russia
5 points	Belgium
4 points	Moldova
3 points	Finland
2 points	Malta
1 point	Romania
