= Robert Grace =

Irish singer

- Born: Graiguenamanagh, County Kilkenny, Ireland
- Genres: Pop; soft rock
- Occupations: Singer-songwriter; guitarist; record producer
- Instruments: Vocals; guitar
- Years active: 2013–present
- Label: Sony Music

Robert Grace is an Irish singer-songwriter from County Kilkenny.

== Biography ==
=== Early life ===
Born in Graiguenamanagh, County Kilkenny, Grace was raised in a musical household. His father played traditional Irish music with local bands Drop the Penny and the Keltic Kats Pp.

=== Music career ===
Grace released the singles "Boomerang", "Golden" and "Wanna Love", which gained airplay across Irish radio. In August 2020 his single "Fake Fine" entered the Irish charts, peaking at number 20 on the singles chart and 1 on the Irish Homegrown Top 20.

== Discography ==
=== Albums ===
List of albums
Title	Album details	Peak chart positions
Title	Album details	IRE
Happy Sad Songs	Released: 24 May 2024; Label: Sony Music; Format: compact disc, vinyl, digital download, streaming	—
My Father's Son	Released: 6 November 2026; Label: Twenty7Songs; Formats: digital download, streaming	4

=== Extended plays ===
List of extended plays
Title	EP details
Talk to Me	Released: 12 May 2016; Label: Collective Management; Format: digital download, streaming
XXVII	Released: 18 March 2022; Label: Sony Music; Format: digital download, streaming

=== Singles ===
Title	Year	Peak chart positions	Album
Title	Year	IRE	Album
"Fake Fine"	2020	20	Happy Sad Songs
"Nice Guys Finish Last"	2024	—	Happy Sad Songs
"Home" (featuring Bob Grace and Lincoln Grace)	2025	—	My Father's Son
