= Shay Byrne =

Irish radio presenter

- Born: 19 August 1972 (age 53)
- Occupation: Broadcaster
- Employer: Raidió Teilifís Éireann
- Known for: Presenting on Rising Time ( weekday editions ) on RTÉ Radio
- Spouse: Linda Nolan (2000–)
- Children: Holly Byrne Jack Byrne Katie Byrne

Shay Byrne (born 19 August 1972) is an Irish Radio presenter. Since 2011, he has been host of RTÉ Radio 1's Rising Time on weekday mornings.

== Early life ==
Byrne grew up in Artane and had originally studied accountancy in Carlow, but opted to leave the course early. He then went on to work for a mobile phone company and video equipment company. He then went on to work for his father's painting and decorating business, ultimately taking it over, and he was joined there by his brother Maurice, a former chief inspector with the DSPCA. In 2004, he began to work for events companies, dressing up for promotions, karaoke, DJing, playing Elvis in Christmas cabarets.

== Career at RTÉ ==
In 2005, Byrne joined the Irish public broadcaster Raidió Teilifís Éireann, after his wife spotted an advert for continuity announcers, he began working on shows with Ryan Tubridy and Derek Mooney. After sometime working as a continuity announcer for RTÉ, he became a stand in presenter on RTÉ Radio 1, he subsequently hosted his own show Shay Byrne's Friday Lounge on Friday evening's between 2006 and 2011. It was announced on 4 March 2011, that Byrne would replace Maxi as presenter of Rising Time, following the latter's illness, he currently presents Rising Time from 5.30am to 7am on week days.

== Personal life ==
Byrne met his partner Linda Nolan in the Stillorgan Musical Society and they married in October 2000, they have three children, Holly, Jack and Katie. They currently reside in Dublin.
