= Spain in the Eurovision Song Contest 2013 =

- Eurovision Song Contest 2013
- Participating broadcaster: Radiotelevisión Española (RTVE)
- Country: Spain
- Selection process: Artist: Internal selection Song: El Sueño de Morfeo: Destino Eurovisión
- Selection date: Artist: 17 December 2012; Song: 26 February 2013

Competing entry
- Song: "Contigo hasta el final"
- Artist: ESDM
- Songwriters: David Feito; Raquel del Rosario; Juan Luis Suárez

Placement
- Final result: 25th, 8 points

Participation chronology

Spain was represented at the Eurovision Song Contest 2013 with the song "Contigo hasta el final", written by Raquel del Rosario, David Feito, and Juan Luis Suárez, and performed by themselves under their stage name ESDM. The Spanish participating broadcaster, Radiotelevisión Española (RTVE), selected its entry through a national final, after having previously selected the band internally. RTVE announced ESDM as its representative on 17 December 2012, while the national final El Sueño de Morfeo: Destino Eurovisión was organised in order to select the song ESDM would perform. Three songs, one selected through an Internet public vote, competed in the televised show where an in-studio jury and a public televote selected "Contigo hasta el final" as the winning song.

As a member of the "Big Five", Spain automatically qualified to compete in the final of the Eurovision Song Contest. Performing in position 5, Spain placed twenty-fifth out of the 26 participating countries with 8 points.

== Background ==
Prior to the 2013 contest, Televisión Española (TVE) until 2006, and Radiotelevisión Española (RTVE) since 2007, had participated in the Eurovision Song Contest representing Spain fifty-two times since TVE's first entry in 1961. They have won the contest on two occasions: in 1968 with the song "La, la, la" performed by Massiel and in 1969 with the song "Vivo cantando" performed by Salomé, the latter having won in a four-way tie with France, the Netherlands, and the United Kingdom. They have also finished second four times, with "En un mundo nuevo" by Karina in 1971, "Eres tú" by Mocedades in 1973, "Su canción" by Betty Missiego in 1979, and "Vuelve conmigo" by Anabel Conde in 1995. In 2012, RTVE placed tenth with the song "Quédate conmigo" performed by Pastora Soler.

As part of its duties as participating broadcaster, RTVE organises the selection of its entry in the Eurovision Song Contest and broadcasts the event in the country. RTVE confirmed its intentions to participate at the 2013 contest on 10 December 2012. In 2012, RTVE opted to internally select the artist that would compete at the Eurovision Song Contest, while the song was selected via a national final. The procedure was continued in order to select its 2013 entry.

== Before Eurovision ==
=== Artist selection ===
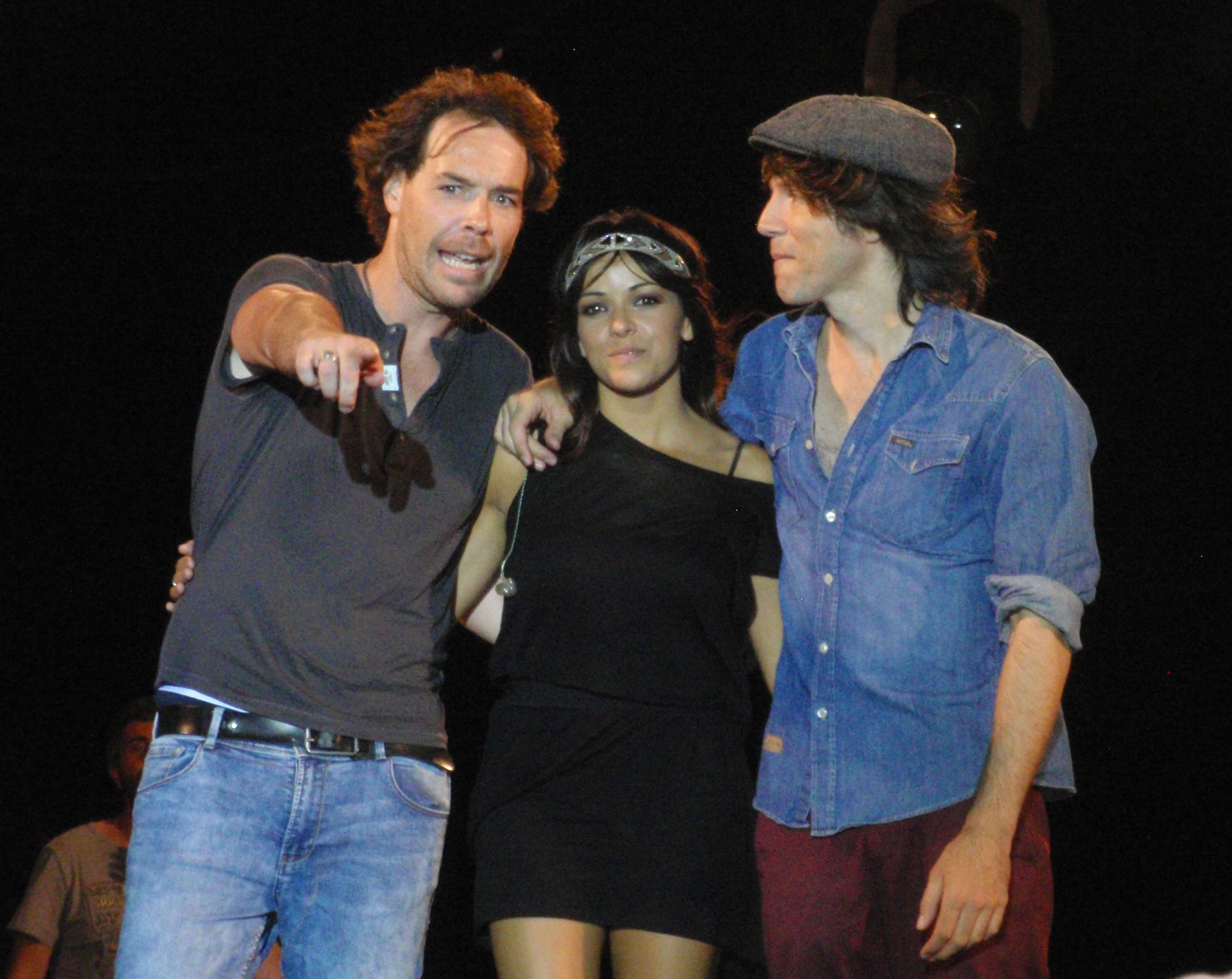
El Sueño de Morfeo was internally selected to represent Spain in the Eurovision Song Contest 2013

In June 2012, Spanish press speculated that RTVE had selected David Bustamante to represent Spain at the 2013 contest, which was later denied by the singer who stated that he had no time to commit to the contest despite being open to the idea of competing. Singer Pablo Alborán was also speculated by international media to have been selected, however his record label EMI Music Spain denied such reports through a press release stating that he was preparing to promote his new album Tanto on tour. Other artists rumoured in the Spanish press included Álex Ubago, David DeMaría, Diana Navarro and Sergio Dalma. On 17 December 2012, RTVE announced during the La 1 evening magazine programme +Gente, presented by Anne Igartiburu, that they had internally selected the band El Sueño de Morfeo, which would use the initials ESDM for easier international communication, to represent Spain in Malmö.

=== El Sueño de Morfeo: Destino Eurovisión ===
RTVE held a press conference at their Torrespaña premises in Madrid on 18 December 2012 where it was revealed that the song ESDM would sing would be selected through a national final titled El Sueño de Morfeo: Destino Eurovisión. During the press conference, the band stated that they have already created three songs that contained a traditional Celtic influence, and were planning to submit an additional two songs to RTVE for presentation. Four songs, all written by ESDM members Raquel del Rosario, David Feito and Juan Luis Suárez, were ultimately submitted, two of them which were selected directly for the national final. The remaining two songs were selected for an Internet vote and revealed on 5 February 2013 via RTVE's official website rtve.es. Users had until 11 February 2013 to vote for their favourite song and the winning song that qualified for El Sueño de Morfeo: Destino Eurovisión was announced on 12 February 2013.

Internet vote – 5–11 February 2013
Song	Percentage	Place	Restult
"Atrévete"	69.9%	1	Qualified
"Revolución"	30.1%	2	—N/a

==== Final ====
El Sueño de Morfeo: Destino Eurovisión took place on 26 February 2013 at TVE studios in Sant Cugat del Vallès (Barcelona), hosted by Carolina Ferre and broadcast on La 1, TVE Internacional, as well as online via RTVE's official website and the official Eurovision Song Contest website eurovision.tv. All three competing songs were performed by ESDM and the winning song, "Contigo hasta el final", was selected through the combination of votes of an in-studio jury (50%) and a public televote (50%).

The three members of the in-studio jury that evaluated the songs were:

- José María Íñigo – Journalist, Eurovision Song Contest television commentator for RTVE
- Rosa López – Singer, represented Spain in 2002
- Marco Mengoni – Singer, set to represent Italy in 2013

In addition to the performances of the competing songs, guest performers included former Eurovision contestant Pastora Soler who represented Spain in 2012, as well as Álex Ubago, La Musicalité and Nek.

El Sueño de Morfeo: Destino Eurovisión – 26 February 2013
R/O	Song	Jury	Televote		Total	Place
R/O	Song	Jury	Percentage	Points	Total	Place
1	"Dame tu voz"	24	12.9%	24	48	3
2	"Atrévete"	30	33.7%	30	60	2
3	"Contigo hasta el final"	36	53.4%	36	72	1

Detailed Jury Votes
R/O	Song	J.M. Íñigo	R. López	M. Mengoni	Total
1	"Dame tu voz"	8	8	8	24
2	"Atrévete"	10	10	10	30
3	"Contigo hasta el final"	12	12	12	36

=== Preparation ===
The official video of the song, directed by Pedro Castro, was filmed in March 2013 in different locations in Llanes, Asturias. The video, which features two people described as having lost their faith in love as they did not know its meaning before they met, premiered on 14 March 2013 on +Gente. The music video served as the official preview video for the Spanish entry. The English language version of the song titled "With You Until the End" was also recorded and released in April 2013.

As part of the contest's graphic design, special postcards were commissioned by the Swedish host broadcaster SVT to introduce each of the participating countries before the performance of the acts. On 24 and 25 March 2013, the Spanish postcard was filmed by SVT in Asturias which observed ESDM showcasing their hobbies and rehearsing and composing their songs in a recording studio.

=== Promotion ===
To specifically promote "Contigo hasta el final" as the Spanish Eurovision entry, ESDM performed a concert during a cruise trip on 10 May, organised by Spanish cruise line Pullmantur, which departed from A Coruña on 3 May and covered several cities across Spain and Europe including Bilbao, Le Havre, Dover, IJmuiden, and Hamburg before docking in Malmö on 11 May.

== At Eurovision ==
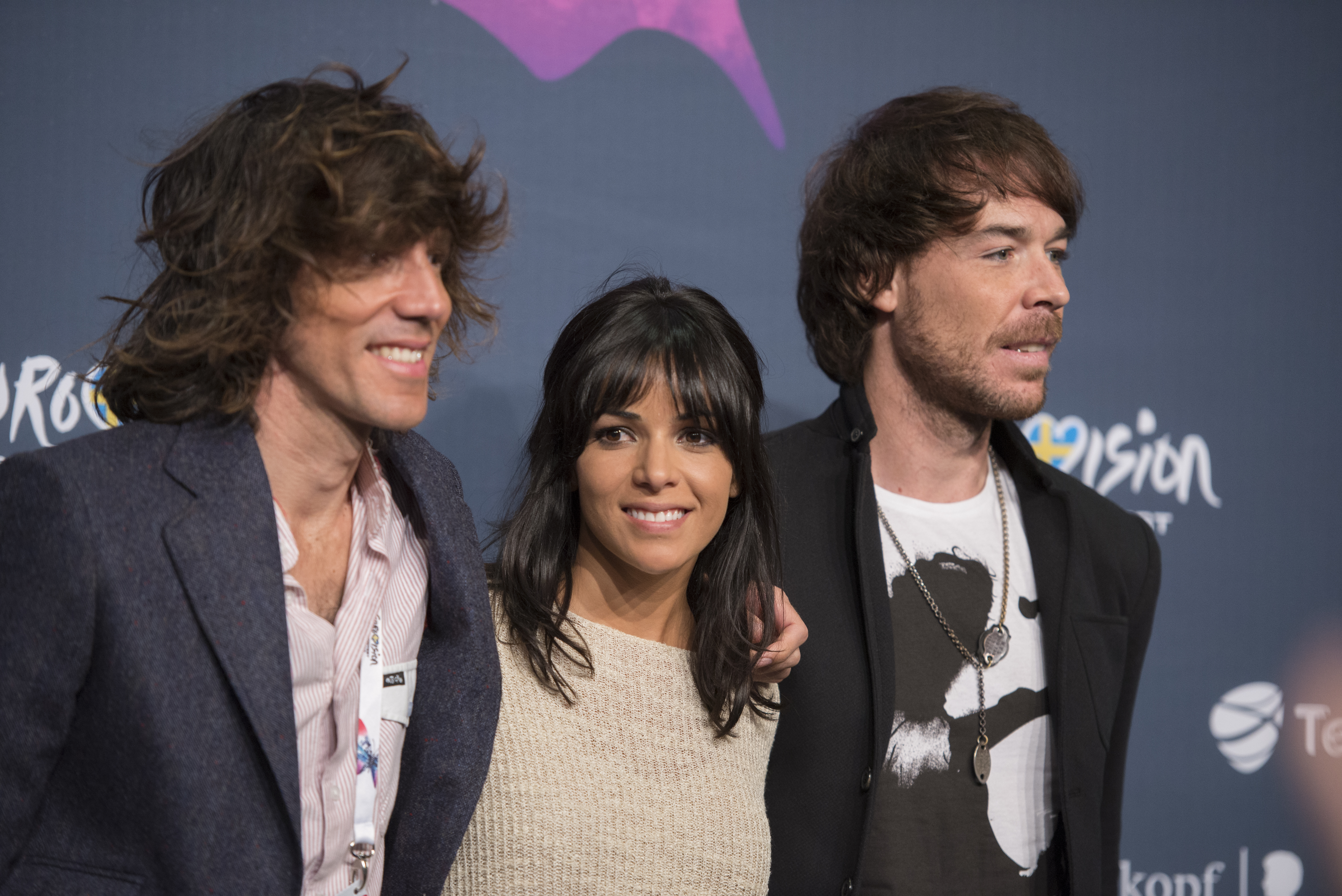
ESDM during a press meet and greet

According to Eurovision rules, all nations with the exceptions of the host country and the "Big Five" (France, Germany, Italy, Spain and the United Kingdom) are required to qualify from one of two semi-finals in order to compete for the final; the top ten countries from each semi-final progress to the final. As a member of the "Big 5", Spain automatically qualified to compete in the final on 18 May 2013. In addition to their participation in the final, Spain is also required to broadcast and vote in one of the two semi-finals. During the semi-final allocation draw on 17 January 2013, Spain was assigned to broadcast and vote in the second semi-final on 16 May 2013.

In Spain, the semi-finals were broadcast on La 2 and the final was broadcast on La 1 with commentary by José María Íñigo. RTVE appointed Inés Paz as its spokesperson to announce during the final the Spanish votes. The broadcast of the final was watched by 5.639 million viewers in Spain with a market share of 33.1%. This represented a decrease of 12.4% from the previous year with 1.173 million less viewers.

=== Final ===
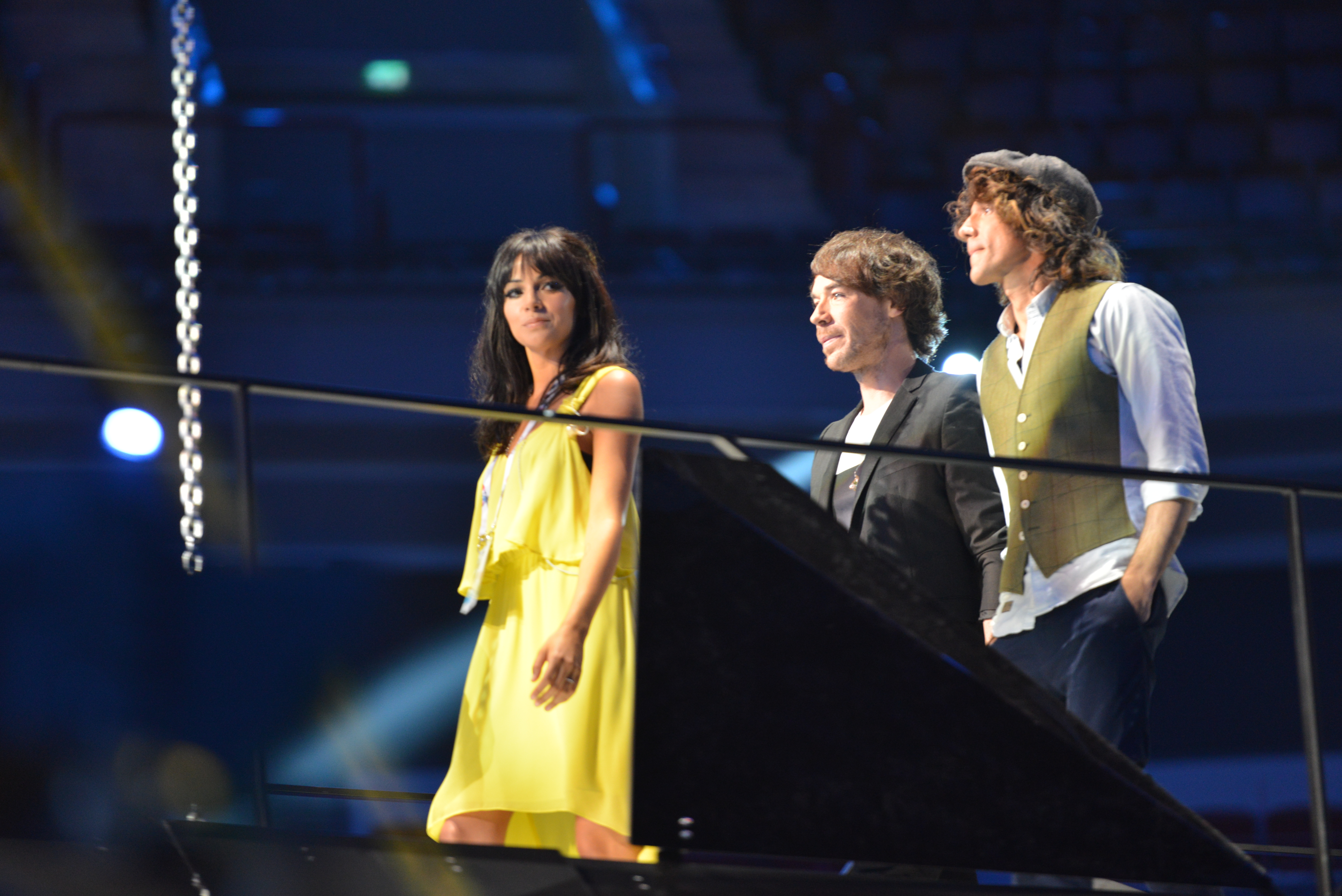
ESDM during a rehearsal before the final

ESDM took part in technical rehearsals on 12 and 15 May, followed by dress rehearsals on 17 and 18 May. This included the jury final on 17 May where the professional juries of each country watched and voted on the competing entries. After the dress rehearsals were held on 15 May, the "Big 5" countries and host nation Sweden held a press conference. As part of this press conference, the artists took part in a draw to determine which half of the grand final they would subsequently participate in. Spain was drawn to compete in the first half. Following the conclusion of the second semi-final, the shows' producers decided upon the running order of the final. The running order for the semi-finals and final was decided by the shows' producers rather than through another draw, so that similar songs were not placed next to each other. Spain was subsequently placed to perform in position 5, following the entry from Finland and before the entry from Belgium. On the day of the grand final, bookmakers considered Spain the twenty-fifth most likely country to win the competition.

The Spanish performance featured the lead singer of ESDM, Raquel del Rosario, on stage barefoot wearing a yellow dress that she designed in collaboration with Yolanda Pérez from Spanish brand Yolancris. Guitarists David Feito and Juan Luis Suárez wore more casual outfits and had no choreography for the performance, staying in one spot. The band was joined by a violinist, a drummer/bagpipe player and a bassist, all of them which also performed backing vocals. The performance began with the bagpipe player standing on the catwalk of the stage, performing the first notes of the song. The stage lighting and LED screens first displayed blue and purple rays of the sun, with imitations of waterfall-like lamps falling from the ceiling, and the rear of the stage had white star-light twinkles projected onto it. The colours changed to shades of red and orange as the song rose in tempo to reflect the warmth of the song. Del Rosario walked along the catwalk of the stage and sang into a light box that lit up in yellow. The light box then rose upwards, along with several other lamps in the audience. The stage director for the performance was Pedro Castro. The three backing performers that joined ESDM were Javi Mendéz, Mey Green and Milena Brody. Green was a backing vocalist for Spain in 2012. Spain placed twenty-fifth in the final, scoring 8 points.

=== Voting ===
Voting during the three shows consisted of 50 per cent public televoting and 50 per cent from a jury deliberation. The jury consisted of five music industry professionals who were citizens of the country they represent. This jury was asked to judge each contestant based on: vocal capacity; the stage performance; the song's composition and originality; and the overall impression by the act. In addition, no member of a national jury could be related in any way to any of the competing acts in such a way that they cannot vote impartially and independently.

Following the release of the full split voting by the EBU after the conclusion of the competition, it was revealed that Spain had placed twenty-sixth with both the public televote and the jury vote. In the public vote, Spain received an average rank of 22.92 and in the jury vote the nation received an average rank of 19.64.

Below is a breakdown of points awarded to Spain and awarded by Spain in the second semi-final and grand final of the contest. The nation awarded its 12 points to Norway in the semi-final and to Italy in the final of the contest.

==== Points awarded to Spain ====
Points awarded to Spain (Final)
Score	Country
12 points	
10 points	
8 points	
7 points	
6 points	Albania
5 points	
4 points	
3 points	
2 points	Italy
1 point	

==== Points awarded by Spain ====
Points awarded by Spain (Semi-final 2)
Score	Country
12 points	Norway
10 points	San Marino
8 points	Finland
7 points	Iceland
6 points	Bulgaria
5 points	Greece
4 points	Georgia
3 points	Israel
2 points	Azerbaijan
1 point	Romania

Points awarded by Spain (Final)
Score	Country
12 points	Italy
10 points	Ukraine
8 points	Denmark
7 points	Azerbaijan
6 points	Russia
5 points	Norway
4 points	United Kingdom
3 points	Germany
2 points	Moldova
1 point	Malta
