= El Viaje de Rose =

- Origin: Badajoz, Extremadura, Spain
- Genres: Pop-rock; funk; pop; blues
- Years active: 2004–present
- Labels: Justo Santos Records; Silence Studios
- Members: Ana Broncano; David González; Daniel Cardiel; David Capellán; Alberto Banderas
- Past members: Borja Murillo “Soto” Adolfo Campini; Javier Vega; Michel Martínez Valdés
- Website: elviajederose.es

El Viaje de Rose (it could be translated as “The Rose’s Journey”) are a Spanish pop-rock band from Badajoz, Extremadura. The band is led by Ana Broncano, the singer. The name El Viaje de Rose is due to the fact that Ana saw a poster of the film Titanic when they were thinking about the name of the band

The band was created in 2004 and Broncano's lyrics have frequent allusions to love and social problems. Well-known songs by El Viaje de Rose include "Deseo", "No se puede matar al amor", "Tras la vida", "Caos", "Ayúdame" and "Perdíteis". The highest moment in the band's career was probably reached with the release of their album Guía de ciudades invisibles, whose single “Deseo” had a significant success in the Concurso Coca-Cola in 2007.

== Band members ==
=== Current ===
- Ana Broncano: voice and acoustic guitar
- David González: keyboard and chorus
- David Capellán: Electric guitar and solo
- Alberto Banderas: bass
- Daniel Cardiel: drums

=== Past ===
- Guitar:
  - Javier Vega.
- Bass:
  - Adolfo Campini
  - Borja Murillo Soto
  - Michel Martínez Valdés

== Discography ==
- Primera Maqueta (2005) (Note: After recording their demo tape in January 2005, they released Primera Maqueta. The result left them unsatisfied so the original demo tape was partially re-recorded and it was released inside “Guía de Ciudades Insivibles” in order to replace the older demo tape.)
- Guía de Ciudades Invisibles (2007)
- El Viaje de Rose (2013)

== See also ==
- El Sueño de Morfeo
- La Oreja de Van Gogh
- Jesse & Joy
