= El Sueño de Morfeo (album) =

El Sueño De Morfeo

Studio album by El Sueño De Morfeo
- Released: March 3, 2005 (Spain); July 9, 2006 (Spain reissued edition)
- Recorded: Music Plant; TRAK, Madrid, Spain
- Genre: Pop, folk, Celtic
- Label: Globomedia Music
- Producer: Manuel Santisteban

El Sueño De Morfeo chronology
El Sueño De Morfeo (2005)	Nos Vemos En El Camino (2007)

Singles from El Sueño de Morfeo
- 1. "Nunca Volverá" Released: 2005; 2. "Ojos de Cielo" Released: 2005; 3. "Okupa de Tu Corazón" Released: 2005; 4. "Esta Soy Yo" Released: 2006; 5. "Tómate la Vida" Released: 2006

El Sueño De Morfeo, is the title of El Sueño De Morfeo's eponymous first studio album, which was released in Spain on March 3, 2005. The lead single (and debut from the band under the El Sueño De Morfeo name), Nunca Volverá, spent 4 non-consecutive weeks at number one in Spain. El Sueño De Morfeo entered and peaked on the Promusicae Album Chart at number four. The album went on to reach double Platinum status, selling 80,000 copies in Spain alone, and 150,000 worldwide. In support of the album, they embarked on a tour of Spain, playing over 100 concerts before travelling to play shows in Central and South America, such as Argentina and Mexico.

After the release of the album, they were recognized in 2005 with a MTV Europe Music Awards nomination for Best Spanish Act, although they eventually lost to El Canto del Loco. They also received an AMAS award, honouring them from the Asturian music community.

== Track listing ==
All songs written and composed by El Sueño de Morfeo.

Standard edition CD
No.	Title	Length
1.	"Somos Aire"	3:39
2.	"Ojos de Cielo"	4:14
3.	"Okupa de Tu Corazón"	3:43
4.	"Rendida a Tus Pies"	3:05
5.	"Hoy Me Ire"	3:16
6.	"Esta Soy Yo"	4:19
7.	"Nunca Volverá"	3:14
8.	"Cosas Que Diran"	3:31
9.	"Puede"	3:14
10.	"A Paso de Tortuga"	4:01
11.	"Amor de Sal"	2:51
12.	"Un Dia de Aquellos"	3:30

Special edition CD/DVD (includes track list from standard edition)
No.	Title	Length
1.	"Un Sueño Hecho Realidad" ("A Dream Come True")
2.	"Videoclips" (Videos: Nunca Volverá, Ojos de Cielo y Okupa de Tu Corazón)
3.	"Uno a Uno" ("One to One": Raquel, Juan y David)
4.	"Una Calle de Paris"	3:42
5.	"Galeria de Fotos" ("Gallery")

Reissued edition CD (includes track list from standard edition except 'Un Dia de Aquellos')
No.	Title	Length
12.	"Sonrisa Especial"	3:35
13.	"Tómate la Vida"	3:58

== Singles ==
=== "Nunca Volvera" ===
"Nunca Volvera" (English: "Never Return") – the second single released by El Sueño De Morfeo in 2005 under the label WM Spain. The song won the first place in the PROMUSICAE, 2005. For the song was filmed video.

==== Music video ====
The videoclip was the first in the repertoire of the group. Filmed 2005 Spain. The video begins with memories of the past events which «never come back». It shows guitarist of the band working on a typewriter, which was long ago replaced by the computers. Another guitarist is watching a video of his childhood on the videotape and videocassette), which were replaced by DVD drives. And the vocalist Raquel Rosario reviews and tears the old photos. In the chorus the group each time appears in a spare room, accompanied by a drummer and bagpiper. At the end of the video Raquel Rosario paints on the walls a label "Nunca volvera" and the light turns out.

==== Participants ====
- Raquel del Rosario – vocals
- David Feito – guitar, back vocals
- Juan Luis Suarez – guitar

=== "Okupa de Tu Corazon" ===
"Okupa de Tu Corazón" (English: "Take Your Heart") is a song of the Spanish band El Sueño De Morfeo, which became the third radio-single from the eponymous album El Sueño De Morfeo (2005).

In 2007 the song was performed during the "MTV Day". Literally, the name of the song is translated as "Take Your Heart".

==== Music video ====
The official video was filmed in Spain in 2005. It consists of two parts (a mixture of a video and concert recording). The film shows the band playing on the roof of one of the highly storey houses. And in the chorus a melody acquires Celtic sound.

=== "Esta Soy Yo" ===
"Ésta Soy Yo" (English: "This is me") - the third single, released by El Sueño de Morfeo from their album El Sueño de Morfeo (2005). The single was released in 2006.

==== Music video ====
The music video for "Ésta soy yo" was shot in 2008 with help of WMG. The video shows Raquel del Rosario singing in her room. Than appear all members of the band (David Feito and Juan Luis Suárez), who lead themselves up in front of the mirror. At the end of the video all members load the guns and rifles sitting at the table, and after it go away. And on the table remains a photo of participants of the group with aim around their heads.
