= Contigo hasta el final =

2013 song by El Sueño de Morfeo

Single by El Sueño de Morfeo

from the album Todos tenemos un sueño
- Language: Spanish
- Released: 5 March 2013
- Genre: Pop rock; Folk
- Length: 3:07
- Label: Warner Music Spain
- Songwriters: David Feito; Raquel del Rosario; Juan Luis Suárez
- Producer: David Feito

El Sueño de Morfeo singles chronology
| "Lo mejor está por llegar" (2011) | "Contigo hasta el final" (2013) |

Music video
- "Contigo hasta el final" on YouTube

Eurovision Song Contest 2013 entry
- Country: Spain
- Artists: David Feito; Raquel del Rosario; Juan Luis Suárez
- As: ESDM
- Language: Spanish
- Composers: David Feito; Raquel del Rosario; Juan Luis Suárez
- Lyricists: David Feito; Raquel del Rosario; Juan Luis Suárez

Finals performance
- Final result: 25th
- Final points: 8

Entry chronology
- ◄ "Quédate conmigo" (2012)
- "Dancing in the Rain" (2014) ►

Official performance video
- "Contigo hasta el final" (final) on YouTube

"Contigo hasta el final" (Spanish pronunciation: [konˈtiɣo ˈasta el fiˈnal], "With you until the end") is a song composed and recorded by Spanish band El Sueño de Morfeo –David Feito, Raquel del Rosario, and Juan Luis Suárez–. It represented Spain in the Eurovision Song Contest 2013, placing twenty-fifth.

== Background ==
=== Selection ===
On 17 December 2012, Radiotelevisión Española (RTVE) announced that it had internally selected El Sueño de Morfeo as its representative for the 58th edition of the Eurovision Song Contest. The band presented four compositions to be in contention for the contest, and they performed three of these at a televised national final. "Contigo hasta el final", together with "Dame tu voz", was internally selected for the national final, whereas "Atrévete" was selected through an online vote over "Revolución".

At the national final, which took place on 26 February 2013 and was aired on La 1 of Televisión Española, the winning song was determined by 50% televoting and 50% jury vote. "Contigo hasta el final" got the highest score by both the juries and televote, and thus was chosen to represent Spain in Eurovision.

=== Release ===
The original version of the song was released as a single on digital platforms on 5 March 2013 as "Contigo hasta el final (Versión Gala TVE Eurovisión)".

Their fifth studio album titled Todos tenemos un sueño, which was released on 7 May 2013, includes the video version of the song and an English-language version titled "With You Until The End".

=== Music video ===
The official music video of the song premiered on 14 March 2013. The video, directed by Pedro Castro, was filmed in different locations in the municipality of Llanes (Asturias), in early March. The video served to introduce the album version of the song.

=== Eurovision final ===
On 18 May 2013, the grand final of the Eurovision Song Contest was held in the Malmö Arena in Malmö hosted by Sveriges Television (SVT) and broadcast live throughout the continent. El Sueño de Morfeo –renamed ESDM for the contest– performed "Contigo hasta el final" fifth on the night, following Finland's "Marry Me" by Krista Siegfrids and preceding Belgium's "Love Kills" by Roberto Bellarosa.

At the close of voting, it had received 8 points, placing twenty-fifth in a field of twenty-six.

== Chart history ==
=== Weekly charts ===
| Chart (2013) | Peak position |
|---|---|
| Spain (Promusicae) | 32 |
| Spain Airplay (PROMUSICAE) | 32 |
