= Para Toda La Vida =

Para Toda La Vida may refer to:

== Music ==
Albums

- Para Toda La Vida (Rocío Dúrcal album), a 1999 studio album released by Spanish performer Rocío Dúrcal
- Para Toda La Vida (Los Mismos album), a 2008 album by Los Mismos
- Para Toda La Vida, 2011 album by K-Paz de la Sierra

Songs

- "Para Toda La Vida" (song), a 2007 song by El Sueño De Morfeo
- "Para Toda La Vida" by Rocío Dúrcal Composed by Roberto Livi
- "Para Toda la Vida" by Flaco Jiménez
- "Para Toda la Vida" by Juan Gabriel
