= Be Real =

Be Real may refer to:

- BeReal, a social media photo sharing app where users post photos once a day
- "Be Real" (Kid Ink song), 2015
- "Be Real" (Krista Siegfrids song), 2016
- "Be Real" (Phoebe Ryan song), 2017
- "Be Real", a song by Chance McKinney
- "Be Real", a song by Tomorrow's Edition
- "Be Real", a 2012 song by Melissa Etheridge on 4th Street Feeling
- "(Be Yourself) Be Real", a 1972 song by Al Kooper on Naked Songs

== See also ==
- B-Real (born 1970), American rapper
- B-Real, radio personality, The Toucher and Rich Show
