= Marry Me (Krista Siegfrids song) =

2013 song by Krista Siegfrids

Single by Krista Siegfrids

from the album Ding Dong!
- Released: 1 January 2013
- Genre: Pop; dance
- Length: 3:10
- Label: EMI Finland; Universal Music
- Songwriter(s): Krista Siegfrids; Erik Nyholm; Kristofer Karlsson; Jessika Lundström
- Lyricist(s): Krista Siegfrids; Erik Nyholm; Kristofer Karlsson; Jessika Lundström

Krista Siegfrids singles chronology
"Marry Me" (2013)	"Amen!" (2013)

Music video
- "Marry Me" on YouTube

Eurovision Song Contest 2013 entry
- Country: Finland
- Artist(s): Krista Siegfrids
- Language: English
- Composer(s): Krista Siegfrids; Erik Nyholm; Kristofer Karlsson; Jessika Lundström
- Lyricist(s): Krista Siegfrids; Erik Nyholm; Kristofer Karlsson; Jessika Lundström

Finals performance
- Semi-final result: 9th
- Semi-final points: 44
- Final result: 24th
- Final points: 13

Entry chronology
- ◄ "När jag blundar" (2012)
- "Something Better" (2014) ►

Official performance video
- "Marry Me" (Second Semi-Final) on YouTube "Marry Me" (Grand Final) on YouTube

"Marry Me" is a song by Finnish singer Krista Siegfrids. The song was written by Siegfrids, Erik Nyholm, Kristofer Karlsson, and Jessika Lundström. It was released on 1 January 2013 by EMI Finland and distributed by Universal Music. The song later served as the lead single for Siegfrids' debut studio album, Ding Dong! "Marry Me" was the Finnish entry at the Eurovision Song Contest 2013, held in Malmö, where it placed 24th, two spots away from last place in the grand final.

The Eurovision performance of the song drew critical attention when Siegfrids kissed a female background singer during the end of each of her performances as a way of expressing Siegfrids' support for the legalization of same-sex marriage in Finland. The message was seen as controversial as it was accused of trying to display a political message, which is banned by the Eurovision Song Contest. The kiss became a highly polarizing issue; some broadcasters banned the broadcast of Siegfrids' performance and the entire show itself due to the kiss, while LGBTQ+ rights supporters displayed support for Siegfrids' performance and message. The song also drew criticism from feminist writers and activists, who saw the lyrics itself as degrading for women.

== Background and composition ==
"Marry Me" was written and lyrically composed by Siegfrids, Erik Nyholm, Kristofer Karlsson, and Jessika Lundström. Nyholm had previously worked with k-pop group Girls' Generation, while Karlsson and Lundström had both worked with Finnish singer Tarja Turunen. According to Siegfrids, the song to her is a "feel-good uptempo party song" that isn't meant to be taken seriously. The song takes the perspective of "a girlfriend who will do anything to get a proposal from her man" according to The Independent writer Adam Sherwin. In the song, the singer states that she will skip dinner to be skinnier, to be submissive to her husband by comparing herself as a slave, to spy on him, to give him "cuter babies" while pregnant, among other ideals. The song was also a call by Siegfrids herself as a way of expressing her desire to marry her then-boyfriend at the time, Janne Grönroos, with Grönroos promising to marry Siegfrids if she made it to Eurovision.

The song was officially announced to compete in Uuden Musiikin Kilpailu 2013 on 4 December 2012. On 1 January 2013, it was released as a digital download along with all the other songs competing in Uuden Musiikin Kilpailu 2013. At the national final, it competed in the second heat on 24 January, advancing to the final on 31 January.

== Music video and promotion ==
A music video was released on 4 February, which premiered on Yle. The music video was directed by Elias Koskimies. The music video features Siegfrids kidnapping and forcing a man to marry her, with the help of several altar women.

In order to further promote the song, Yle and Siegfrids agreed to produce a six-episode web series titled "Marry Me, Europe!" that documented Siegfrids' time in Malmö and her background. Siegfrids also appeared in a music video that parodied the original music video, with the parody featuring two gay men wanting to marry each other; the video also advocated for same-sex marriage to be legalized in Finland. She also performed the song at numerous Eurovision pre-parties, including the London Eurovision Party and Eurovision In Concert.

== Critical reception ==
Anthony Granger, writer for Eurovoix, gave a positive review of the song, praising the upbeat nature of the song itself. Granger described his views of the song as "a perfect insane Eurovision entry". In a Wiwibloggs review containing several reviews from individual critics, the song was given a score of 5.71 out of 10 points. Another review by ESCUnited that also contained several reviews from individual critics gave the song a score of 39 out of 70 points.

The song itself garnered some criticism from feminists on claims that the song degraded women. Linnea Portin, a feminist blog writer, described the song as an "anti-feminist squealing song". In response to their comments, Siegfrids criticized Portin's "lack of humor", stating, "If [they] doesn't have a sense of humor, it's not my fault. This is a Eurovision song, humor!"

== Eurovision Song Contest ==
=== Uuden Musiikin Kilpailu 2013 ===
Finland's broadcaster Yleisradio Oy (Yle) organized a 12-entry competition, Uuden Musiikin Kilpailu 2013 consisting of two heats and a semi-final that culminated into a grand final to select its entrant for the Eurovision Song Contest 2013. The edition was the second iteration of the contest. The two heats, consisting of six songs each were held on 17 and 24 January 2013, respectively, with the top two songs in each heat moving onto the grand final, with the next three songs in each heat advancing towards the semi-final. The semi-final was held on 31 January, and the top four songs moved onto the grand final with the four songs that had already advanced. The grand final was held on 9 February. The winner of the final was selected by a 50/50 combination of public votes and a panel of four judges.

"Marry Me" was officially announced to compete in the competition on 4 December 2012. It was placed into the second heat, where it managed to place second in the heat, advancing the song directly to the grand final on 9 February. The performance featured Siegfrids in a wedding dress along with two backing singers, three "bridesmaids" that changed costumes midway through her performance, and additional background dancers. In the grand final, she performed a repeat of her heat performance, winning the contest with a jury score of 14.6% and a televoting score of 38.6%, averaging a 26.6% overall vote, winning the Finnish spot for the Eurovision Song Contest 2013.

=== At Eurovision ===
The Eurovision Song Contest 2013 took place at the Malmö Arena in Malmö, Sweden and consisted of two semi-finals held on 14 and 16 May, respectively, and the final on 18 May 2013. According to Eurovision rules, all countries, except the host and the "Big Five" (France, Germany, Italy, Spain, and the United Kingdom), were required to qualify from one semi-final to compete in the final; the top ten countries from each semi-final progressed to the final. In a press conference held on 17 January 2013, a special allocation press conference was held to determine which countries would perform in each semi-final. Finland was placed into the second semi-final, performing in the first half of the show.

For its Eurovision performance, the song was altered, with minor changes being made in order to accommodate a three-minute time limit that the Eurovision Song Contest sets for each performance. Siegfrids performed the song fifth in the semi-final, after Azerbaijan's Farid Mammadov and before Malta's Gianluca. Changes to Siegfrids' performance were also made; while the two background singers and three "bridesmaids" were kept, the background screen featured a parody of the Welcome to Fabulous Las Vegas sign. In addition, the entire performance was themed after a wedding held in the city of Las Vegas, known for its instant weddings. After promising that her Eurovision performance would have a "surprise" at the end of her performance, she kissed a background singer at the end of her performance, which was the first same-sex kiss broadcast in a Eurovision performance. "Marry Me" finished ninth, receiving 44 points and securing a spot in the grand final.

Siegfrids performed a repeat of her performance in the grand final on 18 May. The song was performed in fourth, after Moldova's Aliona Moon and Spain's ESDM. After the results were announced, Siegfrids finished 24th with 13 points, only ahead of EDSM and Ireland's Ryan Dolan. No country gave the song 12 points; the maximum given to the song was four, given by Israel. In response to her result, Siegfrids expressed disappointment, stating, "Europe is not ready for this. It does not feel good."

The Eurovision performance received mixed reviews. Stuart Heritage, writer for The Guardian, gave a positive review of the song itself, stating that "this IS the most Eurovisiony song we've heard... I've decided that I really like this song. A lot... Magnificent." However, he gave a more negative review on Krista's appearance, stating that she "looks like a Lazytown character". Ann Gripper, writer for the Daily Mirror, gave the performance a positive review, stating, "Wedding bells pealing in the background and fun, simple lyrics help to make it a catchy number that will stick in your head... with a lesbian kiss ending her performance in rehearsals she should certainly manage to be remembered come voting time."

==== Same-sex kiss controversy ====
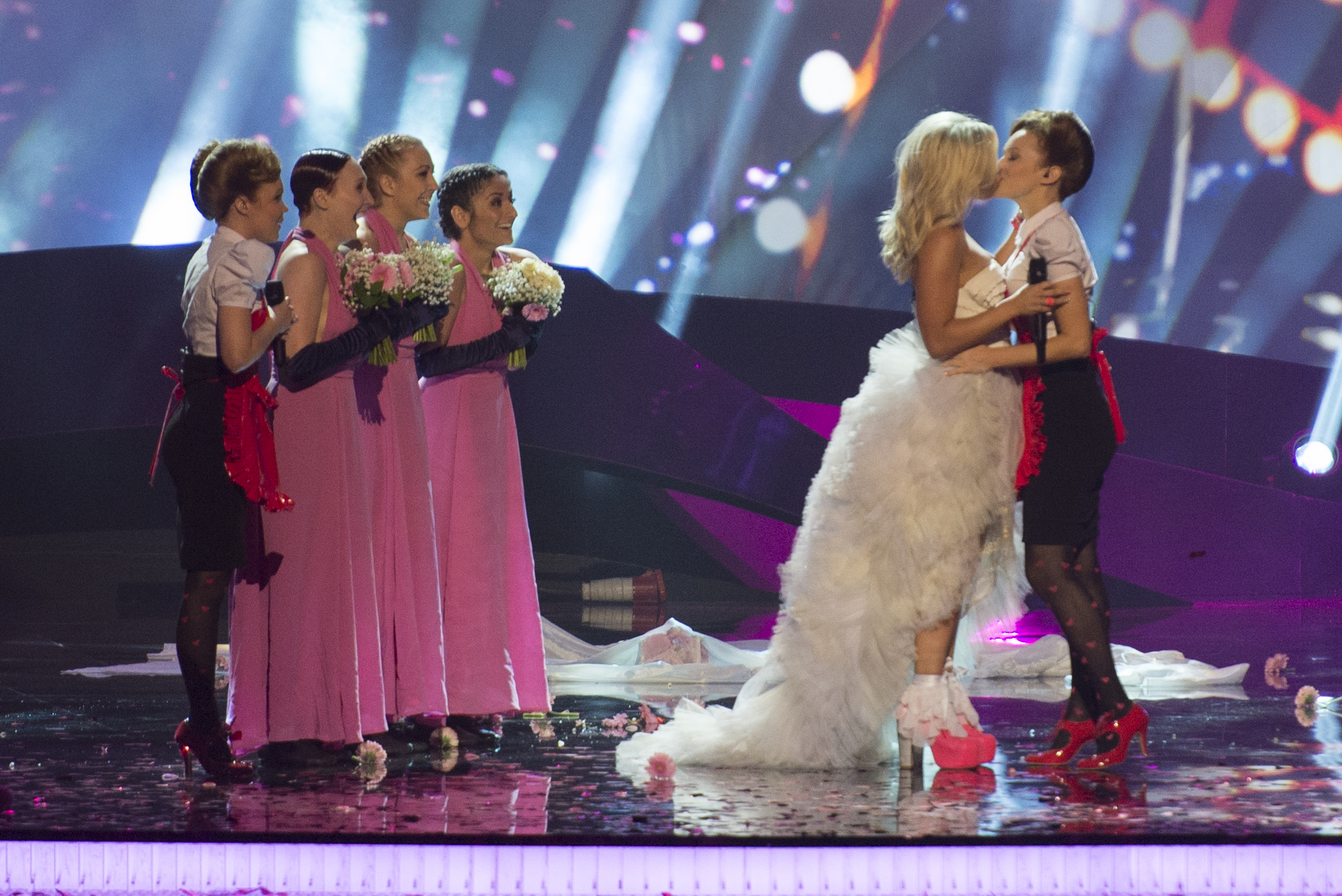
Siegfrids and a background singer sharing a kiss at the end of their Eurovision performance. The kiss was accused of displaying a political message, which is banned by the Eurovision Song Contest.

During the end of each of Siegfrids' performances in both rehearsals and the live shows, Siegfrids and a female background singer kissed at the end of the performance. According to Siegfrids, the kiss was a message of support for the legalization of same-sex marriage in Finland, which at the time had been illegal, despite same-sex partnerships having been legal in Finland since 2002. She first kissed a background singer during the Eurovision In Concert pre-party held in April, with Siegfrids admitting that the kiss had been a "statement". The kiss was seen as a crucial part of a "gay coup" that was supported by host broadcaster Sveriges Television, in an attempt to make the Eurovision Song Contest more LGBTQ+ friendly than in recent contests held in Russia and Serbia.

Numerous broadcasters in response to the kiss banned the broadcast of Siegfrids' kiss and in some cases, both the second semi-final and the grand final itself along with general criticism of the performance. CCTV-15, a music broadcasting station of China Central Television, showed Siegfrids' performance but cut off the broadcast of the kiss on a tape delay broadcast shown in October 2013, a decision that angered Siegfrids. Yle recorded cases of anti-LGBTQ+ rights activists protesting the song in Georgia, a heavily Eastern Orthodox country.

The Turkish Radio and Television Corporation (TRT), who pulled out of the contest in 2013 but initially pledged to air that year's contest, barred the broadcast of the second semi-final. In an official statement that was given out by TRT, the contest was not shown due to "low ratings", although the claim was disputed by pro-LGBTQ+ rights activists and supporters, including Eurovision fansite Wiwibloggs and LGBTQ+ rights organization All Out. Andre Banks, the executive director of All Out, expressed anger at TRT, stating, "All Out members are not fooled by [TRT's] weak excuse. It is clear to the world that [TRT] pulled the popular Eurovision show simply because two women expressed love through a kiss. Nothing could be more harmless than a kiss between two people."

== Track listing ==
- Digital download (Note: This acts as a summary of all versions of the song released for digital download.)
1. "Marry Me" – 3:10

== Charts ==
=== Weekly charts ===
Chart (2013)	Peak positions
Finland Download (Latauslista)	6
Germany (GfK)	84
Iceland (Tonlist)	29
Ireland (IRMA)	99
Sweden (Sverigetopplistan)	50
Turkey (Number One Charts)	59
UK Singles (Official Charts Company)	102

== Release history ==
Country	Date	Format(s)	Label	Ref.
Various	1 January 2013	Digital download	EMI Finland	
