= Can You See Me? =

Can You See Me? may refer to:

- "Can You See Me?" (Krista Siegfrieds song), a song from Ding Dong! (2013)
- "Can You See Me", a song by Jimi Hendrix from Are You Experienced (1967)
- Can You See Me? (album), a 2024 album by Rezz
  - "Can You See Me?", the titular song of the album by Rezz
