= Para Toda La Vida (song) =

Single by El Sueño De Morfeo

from the album Nos vemos en el camino
- Released: March 12, 2007 (Spain - radio)
- Genre: Powerpop / Folk
- Length: 3:57
- Songwriters: Raquel del Rosario, David Feito, Juan Luis Suárez

El Sueño De Morfeo singles chronology
"Tómate La Vida" (2006)	"Para Toda La Vida" (2007)	"Demasiado Tarde" (2007)

"Para Toda La Vida" (English: For All Life) is the first official single to be released from El Sueño De Morfeo's 2007 studio album, "Nos vemos en el camino". The single was premiered on March 10 in Los40 radio Spain. On March 24 debuted at #34 on Los40.

== Music video ==
The video was shot in 2008. It was edited with chroma key effect with replacing of white background. The video mixes influences from cartoon motion and live action. It shows a live-action El Sueno de Morfeo with their instruments. At the beginning, they are chased by cartoon birds as they walk through a beach with a cartoon sea, sky and sun. They then pass a live-action garden with three live-action teddy bears reminiscent of giant pandas. In the garden is a live-action house with a dog outside. Raquel is in a room with a TV inside. She switches on the TV and sees a picture of Juan Luis standing on the roof, holding a TV aerial in his hand. Later, the band walks down a cartoon city with plastic toy aeroplanes flying above. When the line "si fueras tan solo palabras" is being sung, Juan Luis is shown painting cartoon black-and-white pictures on a live-action brick wall. When the chorus of the song is being performed, the band performs against a pixelated ever-changing background, with the words "para toda la vida" hovering above the band in odd fonts. After the second chorus, an instrumental guitar solo starts playing, and Juan Luis is shown on his own with his guitar, against the same ever-changing pixelated background. As the guitar solo nears the end, it looks as if three yellow cartoon electricity bolts are emerging from the guitar and are shaking along to the music.

== Charts ==
Chart	Peak position
Spain Los40	4
Nielsen Spain SoundScan	4
