= Ding Dong! =

2013 studio album by Krista Siegfrids

Studio album by Krista Siegfrids
- Released: 10 May 2013
- Recorded: 2012
- Genre: Dance-pop
- Label: Universal Music Finland

Singles from Ding Dong!
- 1. "Marry Me" Released: 1 February 2013; 2. "Amen!" Released: 2013; 3. "Can You See Me?" Released: 30 September 2013

Ding Dong! is the debut studio album by Finnish pop singer Krista Siegfrids. The album was released in Finland on 10 May 2013 by Universal Music Finland. The first single from the album was "Marry Me," and it was released on 1 January 2013. The album peaked at number 19 on the Finnish Albums Chart.

== Critical reception ==
The album drew comparisons to the music of Katy Perry and Ke$ha. James Sayer of ESC Views reviewed the album, describing it as being "full of the same quirky, high-octane pop that has quickly characterized Krista's musical style".

== Commercial performance ==
The album entered the Finnish Albums Chart at number 24, and it climbed to number 19 in its second week. The album spent five weeks on the chart, peaking at number 19.

== Singles ==
- "Marry Me" was released as the lead single from the album on 1 January 2013. She performed the song at the Eurovision Song Contest 2013. In the semifinal, she finished 9th and scored 64 points, and in the final, she finished 24th and scored 13 points.
- "Amen!" was released as the second single from the album.
- "Can You See Me?" was released as the third single on 30 September 2013.

== Track listing ==
Standard listing
No.	Title	Writer(s)	Length
1.	"More Is More"		3:04
2.	"Marry Me"	Krista Siegfrids; Erik Nyholm; Kristofer Karlsson; Jessika Lundström	3:09
3.	"Money"		3:03
4.	"Amen!"		2:57
5.	"Can You See Me?"	Krista Siegfrids; Erik Nyholm	3:53
6.	"Seventeen"		3:03
7.	"Your Boyfriend"		2:56
8.	"Under My Skin"		3:14
9.	"Lipstick It"		3:11
10.	"Stupid Love"		3:43

== Chart performance ==
=== Weekly charts ===
Chart (2013)	Peak position
Finnish Albums (Suomen virallinen lista)	19

== Release history ==
Region	Date	Format	Label
Finland	10 May 2013	CD; Digital download	Universal Music Finland
