= Cinderella (Krista Siegfrids song) =

Single by Krista Siegfrids
- Released: 1 January 2014
- Recorded: 2013
- Genre: Dance-pop
- Length: 3:35
- Label: Universal Music Finland

Krista Siegfrids singles chronology
"Can You See Me?" (2013)	"Cinderella" (2014)	"On & Off" (2015)

"Cinderella" is a song recorded by Finnish singer Krista Siegfrids. The song was released as a digital download in Finland on 1 January 2014. The song peaked at number 46 on the Finnish Download Chart and number 79 on the Finnish Airplay Chart.

== Music video ==
A music video to accompany the release of "Cinderella" was first released onto YouTube on 28 February 2014 at a total length of three minutes and thirty-six seconds.

== Track listing ==
Digital download
No.	Title	Length
1.	"Cinderella"	3:35

== Chart performance ==
Chart (2014)	Peak positions
Finland Download (Latauslista)	46
Finland Airplay (Radiosoittolista)	79

== Release history ==
Region	Date	Format	Label
Finland	1 January 2014	Digital download	Universal Music Finland
