= Faller (song) =

Single by Krista Siegfrids
- Released: 28 February 2016
- Recorded: 2015
- Genre: Dance-pop
- Length: 3:01
- Label: Universal Music Finland
- Songwriters: Krista Siegfrids; Gabriel Alares; Magnus Wallin; Gustaf Svenungsson

Krista Siegfrids singles chronology
"Better On My Own" (2015)	"Faller" (2016)	"Be Real" (2016)

"Faller" (English: Falling) is a song recorded by Finnish singer Krista Siegfrids. The song was released as a digital download in Finland on 28 February 2016. The song peaked at number 96 on the Swedeish Singles Chart. The song took part in Melodifestivalen 2016, and placed fifth in the second semi-final. The song was written by Krista Siegfrids, Gabriel Alares, Magnus Wallin and Gustaf Svenungsson.

== Track listing ==
Digital download
No.	Title	Length
1.	"Faller"	3:01

== Charts ==
Chart (2016)	Peak positions
Sweden (Sverigetopplistan)	96

== Release history ==
Region	Date	Format	Label
Finland	28 February 2016	Digital download	Universal Music Finland
