= Pastora Soler =

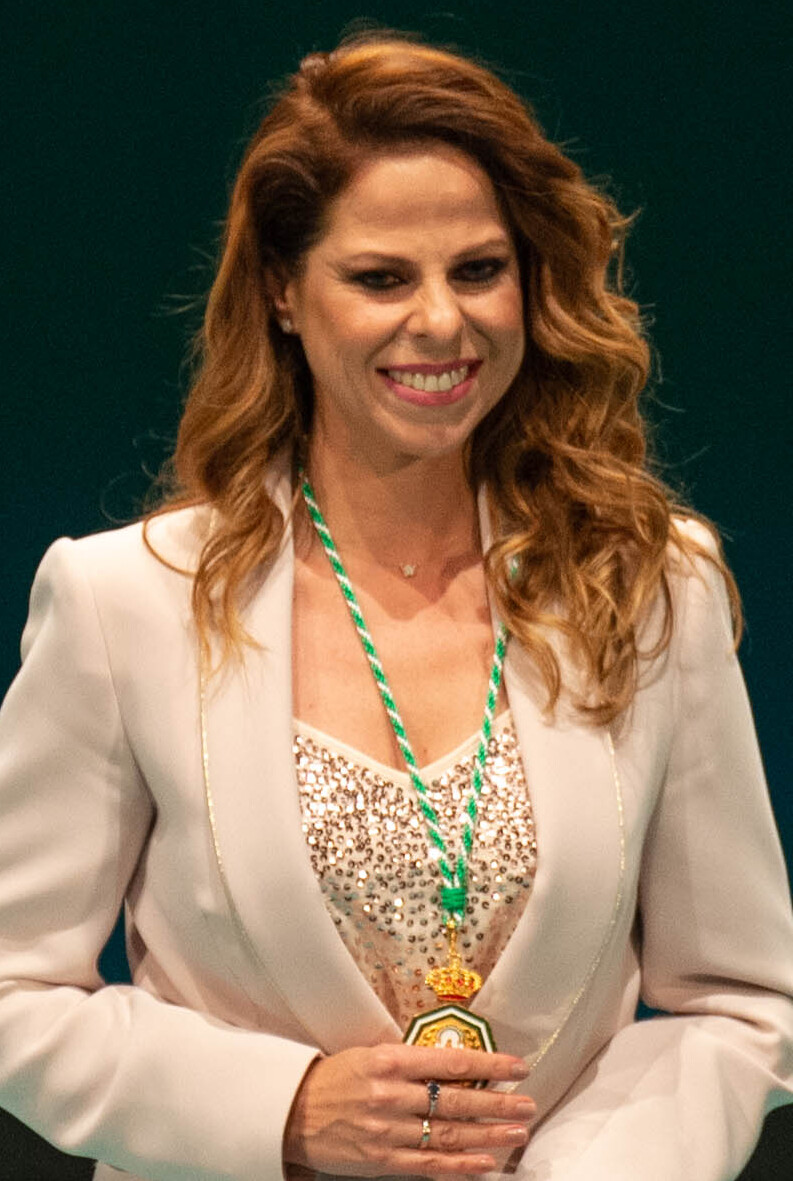
- Soler in 2019

Background information
- Born: María del Pilar Sánchez Luque; 28 September 1978 (age 47); Coria del Río (Seville), Spain
- Genres: Pop, flamenco
- Occupation: Singer
- Years active: 1994–2014; 2017–present
- Labels: Polygram (1994–1999); Emi-Odeón (1999–2005); Warner Music Spain (2005–present)

María del Pilar Sánchez Luque (born 28 September 1978 in Coria del Río, Seville), better known by her stage name Pastora Soler, is a Spanish singer. She is also a songwriter and her compositions usually mix copla or flamenco with pop or electronic music.

Soler represented Spain in the Eurovision Song Contest 2012 in Baku, Azerbaijan with the song "Quédate conmigo" and came in 10th place.

== Career ==
=== Early years ===
A precocious chanteuse, she started singing coplas and flamenco songs at several events when she was a child. In 1994 she was signed to the record company Polygram to release her first studio album, Nuestras coplas, which consisted of covers of ten classical copla songs by León or Quiroga. Pop and commercial sounds arrived in 1996 with her second album, El mundo que soné, which was the last she published with Polygram.

=== 1999–2004: Fuente de luna, Corazón congelado and Deseo ===
In 1999, she was signed to Emi-Odeón and released her third album, Fuente de luna. This album included her first big hit single, "Dámelo ya", which sold 120,000 copies in Spain and was also a number one hit in Turkey.

In 2001, her fourth album Corazón congelado was published, produced by Carlos Jean. The same-titled single was selected to be the official theme of the 2001 Vuelta a España. The album received a platinum certification for its sales. Her fifth album, Deseo (2002), was also produced by Carlos Jean; musically it was closer to electronic music than her previous works. This album was also awarded a platinum certification.

=== 2005–2006: Contract with Warner, Pastora Soler and Sus grandes éxitos ===
In 2005, she changed record company and signed to Warner Music Spain. Her first studio album with Warner, Pastora Soler, produced by Danilo Ballo and recorded in Madrid and Milan, included more mature music and themes. Its first promotional single "Sólo tú" was a dramatic ballad. The album received a gold certification for its sales. The same year her first compilation album was released, Sus grandes éxitos.

=== 2007: Toda mi verdad ===
Her seventh studio album, Toda mi verdad, was released in 2007. Recorded in Tarifa and produced by Jacobo Calderón, it consisted mostly of compositions by Antonio Martínez-Ares. For the first time a composition by Soler herself was included, the song that gives title to the album. The album peaked at number thirteen in the official Spanish album chart and received the Premio de la Música (Spanish Music Award) for Best Copla Album. The tour that followed the release of the album took her to Egypt, where she performed at the Cairo Opera House.

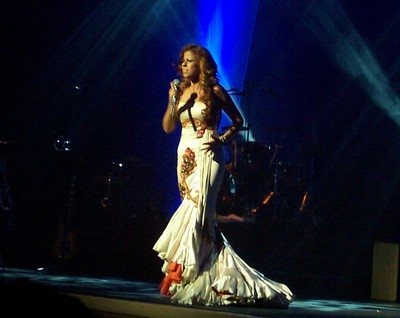
Pastora Soler in concert

=== 2009–2010: Bendita locura and 15 años ===
In February 2009, her single "Bendita locura" was released, the single that gives title to the same titled studio album. The album, produced by Pablo Pinilla, consisted of thirteen new tracks, including a duet with Manuel Carrasco and compositions by David DeMaría, Martínez Ares, Esmeralda Grao, Vanesa Martín, David Santiesteban, José Abraham and Alejandro Sanz. It peaked at number eight in the official Spanish album chart.

In September 2010 she released a CD+DVD recorded live at the Teatro Lope de Vega in Seville that celebrated her 15 years of career as a recording artist, 15 años. It includes her biggest hits, as well as duets with Malú, Miguel Poveda and Manuel Carrasco. The single chosen to promote this album was an acoustic version of "La mala costumbre", a song dedicated to her father that was included in her previous work. The album peaked at number eight in the official Spanish album chart. The album was nominated for the 2011 Latin Grammy Award for Best Flamenco Album. In Spain, it won the Premio de la Música for Best Copla Album and was nominated for Best Album of the Year.

=== 2011–2012: Una mujer como yo and Eurovision Song Contest ===
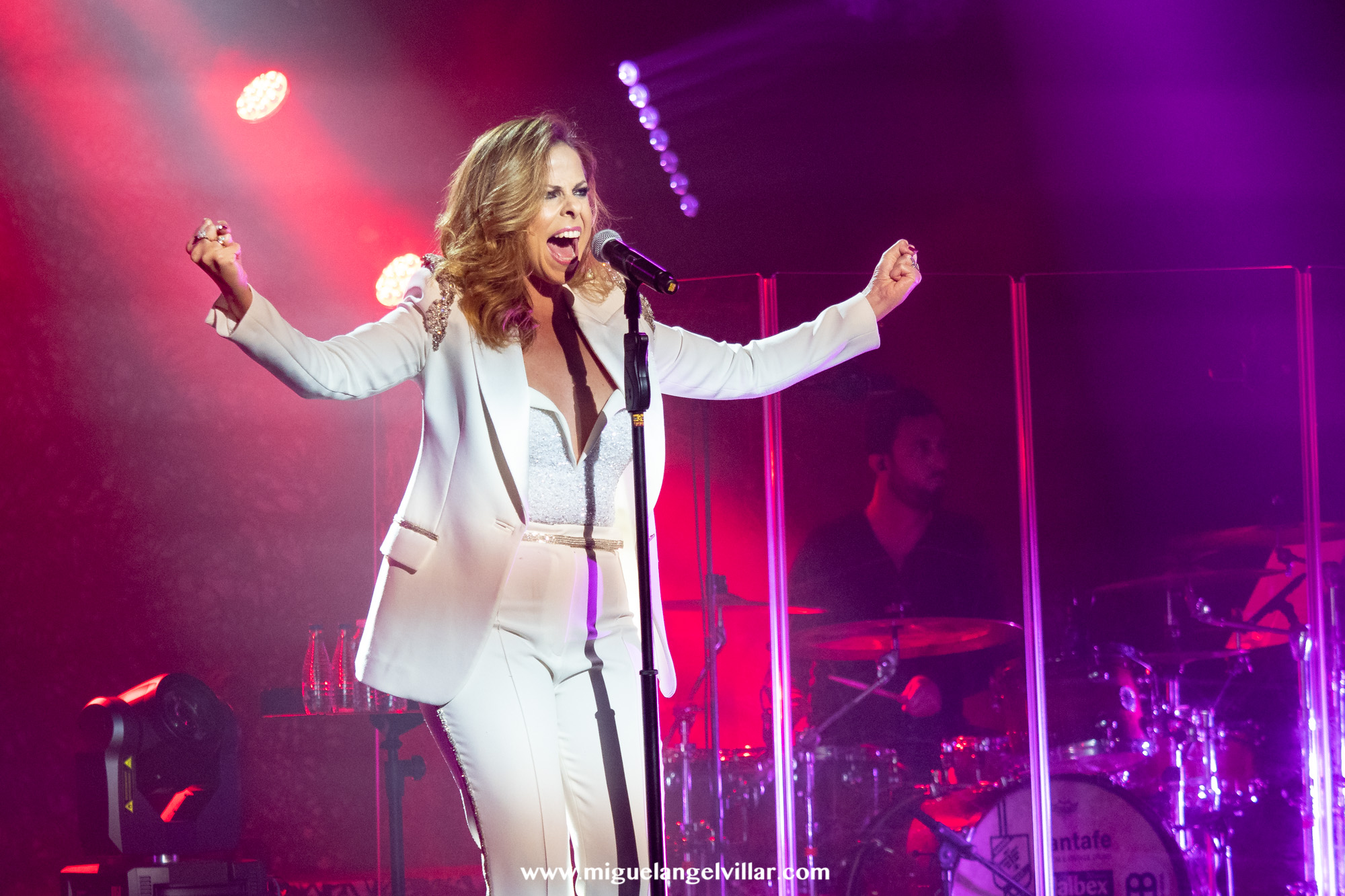
Pastora in a concert in 2018

Her ninth studio album was released in October 2011, Una mujer como yo, including twelve new tracks. It was produced by Pablo Pinilla. The album debuted at number No. 3 on the Spanish album chart.

On 21 December 2011 she was selected internally by RTVE to represent Spain in the Eurovision Song Contest 2012 in Baku, Azerbaijan. The song "Quédate conmigo", penned by Thomas G:son, Tony Sánchez-Ohlsson and Erik Bernholm, was chosen as her entry in a special live show on 3 March. On 26 May 2012 she finished 10th in the Eurovision final with 97 points. Commercially, "Quédate conmigo" ranked at number 35 on the year-end Spanish singles chart.

=== 2013: El Número Uno and Conóceme ===
In 2013, Soler was hired as a judge for the second season of Spanish talent show El Número Uno along with David Bustamante, Mónica Naranjo and Pitingo. The show aired on Antena 3 from 31 May to 5 July 2013.

On 10 September 2013 Soler released her tenth studio album, Conóceme, produced by Tony Sánchez-Ohlsson. The album was preceded by its first single, "Te despertaré", which was released on 22 July 2013 and debuted at number 17 on the Spanish Singles Chart. The album debuted at number 2 on the Spanish Album Chart.

=== 2014–2016: 20 and career hiatus, La Voz Kids ===
On 1 December 2014, Soler announced that she would stop her career for a while citing stage fright problems. On 8 March 2014, Soler had fainted on stage in a concert in Seville, and she had postponed or cancelled a number of events afterwards. The announcement came after she abruptly left the stage during a concert in Málaga on 30 November 2014.

The career hiatus announcement coincided in time with the release of a compilation album to celebrate her 20 years of career as a recording artist, titled 20, on 9 December 2014.

In October 2015, Soler made an appearance as a guest mentor on the second season of Spanish series La Voz Kids (The Voice Kids).

=== 2017–2018: La calma and national tour ===
On 1 February 2017, Soler announced through her social media that she had ended her break from music career and that she would start recording a new studio album, produced by Pablo Cebrián. She also announced a national tour of concerts through Spain for 2017 with stops in Madrid's Teatro Real, Barcelona's Liceu, Seville's Auditorio Rocío Jurado, and Valencia's Palau de les Arts, among others. On 14 July 2017, "La tormenta", the first single of her upcoming album, was released. Her eleventh studio album, titled La calma, was released on 15 September 2017. It debuted at number 1 on the Spanish Album Chart, her first number one with Warner ever.

=== 2019–present: Sentir, La Voz Senior and Mask Singer ===
On 18 October 2019, Soler released her twelfth studio album, titled Sentir and produced by Pablo Cebrián. It was preceded by the promotional single "Aunque me cueste la vida". In December 2019, Soler was featured in the holiday television special Quédate conmigo on La 1 on occasion of her twenty-fifth anniversary as a recording artist.

In 2020, Soler became a coach on the second season of Spanish series La Voz Senior (The Voice Senior). Also in 2020, Soler participated in the Antena 3 series Mask Singer: Adivina quién canta (part of the Masked Singer franchise) as Pavo Real (Peacock).

== Family life ==
Soler married choreographer Francis Viñolo on 17 October 2009. Together they have two daughters, Estrella (born 15 September 2015) and Vega (born 28 January 2020).

== Discography ==
=== Studio albums ===
Title	Details	Peak chart positions	Certifications
Title	Details	SPA	Certifications
Nuestras coplas	Released: 13 September 1994; Labels: Polygram; Format: Digital download, CD	—	
El mundo que soñé	Released: 1996; Labels: Polygram; Format: Digital download, CD	—	
Fuente de luna	Released: 8 June 1999; Labels: Emi-Odoén; Format: Digital download, CD	1	PROMUSICAE: Platinum
Corazón congelado	Released: April 2001; Labels: Emi-Odoén; Format: Digital download, CD	—	PROMUSICAE: Platinum
Deseo	Released: 28 November 2002; Labels: Emi-Odoén; Format: Digital download, CD	—	PROMUSICAE: Platinum
Pastora Soler	Released: 26 April 2005; Labels: Warner Music; Format: Digital download, CD	17	
Toda mi verdad	Released: 7 June 2007; Labels: Warner Music; Format: Digital download, CD	13	
Bendita locura	Released: 21 April 2009; Labels: Warner Music; Format: Digital download, CD	8	
Una mujer como yo	Released: 18 October 2011; Labels: Warner Music; Format: Digital download, CD	3	
Conóceme	Released: 10 September 2013; Labels: Warner Music; Format: Digital download, CD	2	
La calma	Released: 15 September 2017; Labels: Warner Music; Format: Digital download, CD	1	PROMUSICAE: Gold
Sentir	Released: 11 October 2019; Labels: Warner Music; Format: Digital download, CD	4	
"—" denotes a recording that did not chart or was not released in that territory.

=== Live albums ===
Title	Details	Peak chart positions
Title	Details	SPA
15 años	Released: 7 September 2010; Labels: Warner Music; Format: Digital download, CD	9
La calma directo	Released: 19 October 2018; Labels: Warner Music; Format: Digital download, CD	—
"—" denotes a recording that did not chart or was not released in that territory.

=== Compilations ===
Title	Details	Peak chart positions
Title	Details	SPA
Sus grandes éxitos (Greatest Hits)	Released: 2005; Format: Digital download, CD	—
20	Released: 2014; Labels: Warner Music; Format: Digital download, CD	28
30	Released: 15 November 2024; Format: Digital download, CD	—
"—" denotes a recording that did not chart or was not released in that territory.

=== EPs ===
Title	Details
Especial Eurovisión	Released: 2012; Labels: Warner Music; Format: Digital download

=== Singles ===
Title	Year	Peak chart positions	Album
Title	Year	SPA	Album
"Triniá"	1994	—	Nuestras coplas
"Romance de la reina Mercedes"	1994	—	Nuestras coplas
"Capote de grana y oro"	1995	—	Nuestras coplas
"La flor de los cantes"	1995	—	Nuestras coplas
"Lento amanecer"	1996	—	El mundo que soñé
"Cómo sabré"	1996	—	El mundo que soñé
"Sike noke"	1996	—	El mundo que soñé
"Gracias madre"	1998	—	Non-album single
"Dámelo ya"	1999	—	Fuente de luna
"La brisa"	1999	—	Fuente de luna
"Diki diki"	2000	—	Fuente de luna
"Solo por amarte"	2000	—	Fuente de luna
"En mi soledad"	2001	—	Corazón congelado
"Corazón congelado"	2001	—	Corazón congelado
"Ven a mí"	2001	—	Corazón congelado
"Otra ocupa mi lugar"	2001	—	Corazón congelado
"Ese niño es de verdad"	2001	—	Corazón congelado
"Guerra fría"	2002	—	Deseo
"Herida"	2002	—	Deseo
"Se me va la vida"	2003	—	Deseo
"Café Café"	2003	—	Deseo
"Solo tú"	2005	—	Pastora Soler
"Flor de romero"	2005	—	Pastora Soler
"Quién"	2007	—	Toda mi verdad
"Qué va a ser de mí"	2007	—	Toda mi verdad
"Por si volvieras"	2008	—	Toda mi verdad
"20 años"	2009	—	Non-album single
"Bendita Locura"	2009	34	Bendita locura
"Esta vez quiero ser yo"	2009	—	Bendita locura
"La Mala costumbre"	2010	27	15 años
"Demasiado amor"	2011	23	Una mujer como yo
"Quédate conmigo"	2012	6	Una mujer como yo
"Vamos"	2012	—	Una mujer como yo
"Te despertaré"	2013	17	Conóceme
"Espérame"	2014	—	Conóceme
"Vive"	2014	—	Conóceme
"Con él"	2014	—	Non-album single
"Un ratito más"	2015	—	Non-album single
"La Tormenta"	2017	—	La calma
"Ni una más"	2018	—	La calma
"No te atrevas a olvidarme"	2018	—	La calma
"Aunque me cueste la vida"	2019	—	Sentir
"Al fondo a la izquierda"	2020	—	Non-album singles
"Charcos de luz"	2020	—	Non-album singles
"Cicatrizando"	2020	—	Non-album singles
"La soledad"	2020	—	Non-album singles
"Mi Luz" (featuring Blas Cantó)	2020	—	Non-album singles
"—" denotes a recording that did not chart or was not released in that territory.

Preceded by Lucía Pérez with Que me quiten lo bailao	Spain in the Eurovision Song Contest; 2012	Succeeded by El Sueño de Morfeo with Contigo hasta el final
Preceded by (Iceland) Yohanna	OGAE Second Chance Contest winner 2012	Succeeded by (Norway) Adelén
