= Nos vemos en el camino =

Nos Vemos En El Camino

Studio album by El Sueño De Morfeo
- Released: April 17, 2007 (Spain)
- Recorded: 2006–2007
- Genre: Pop, rock, folk, Celtic

El Sueño De Morfeo chronology
El Sueño de Morfeo (2005)	Nos Vemos En El Camino (2007)	Cosas que nos hacen sentir bien (2009)

Nos Vemos En El Camino (English: See You On The Way), is the title for El Sueño De Morfeo's second official studio album was released in Spain April 17, 2007.

The First Single "Para Toda La Vida" was premiered March 10, 2007 in "Del 40 al 1" from radio program Los40 Principales Spain. On March 24 the first single debuted at #34 in Los40 Chart.

== Track listing ==
1. Nos Vemos En El Camino
2. Nada Es Suficiente
3. Un Túnel Entre Tu y Yo (Los Serrano Theme Song)
4. Para Toda La Vida [3:58]
5. Chocar
6. Demasiado Tarde
7. En Un Rincón (vocals David Feito)
8. Ciudades perdidas
9. Entérate Ya
10. No Me Dejes
11. Dentro De Ti
12. Mi Columna De Opinión
13. Capítulo II
14. Sonrisa Especial (Bonus Track)

== Charts ==
Chart	Peak position	Cert.	Sales
Promusicae Spanish Albums Chart	2	Gold	40,000
