= On & Off (Krista Siegfrids song) =

Single by Krista Siegfrids
- Released: 20 February 2015
- Recorded: 2013
- Genre: Dance-pop
- Length: 2:54
- Label: Universal Music Finland
- Songwriter(s): Joonas Angeria, Jennifer Clare Elizabeth Armstrong, Patric Sarin

Krista Siegfrids singles chronology
"Cinderella" (2014)	"On & Off" (2015)	"Better On My Own" (2015)

"On & Off" is a song recorded by Finnish singer Krista Siegfrids. The song was released as a digital download in Finland on 20 February 2015. The song peaked at number 8 on the Finnish Download and Airplay Chart.

== Music video ==
A music video to accompany the release of "On & Off" was first released onto YouTube on 20 February 2015 at a total length of three minutes and two seconds.

== Track listing ==
Digital download
No.	Title	Length
1.	"On & Off"	2:54

== Chart performance ==
Chart (2015)	Peak positions
Finland Download (Latauslista)	8
Finland Airplay (Radiosoittolista)	8

== Release history ==
Region	Date	Format	Label
Finland	20 February 2015	Digital download	Universal Music Finland
