= Cosas que nos hacen sentir bien =

Cosas Que Nos Hacen Sentir Bien

Studio album by El Sueño De Morfeo
- Released: 26 May 2009
- Genre: Pop rock, power pop
- Label: Warner Music Spain

El Sueño De Morfeo chronology
Nos vemos en el camino (2007)	Cosas Que Nos Hacen Sentir Bien (2009)	Buscamos Sonrisas (2012)

Cosas Que Nos Hacen Sentir Bien (English: Things That Make Us Feel Good) is the third studio album by Spanish group, El Sueño de Morfeo under their current name (fourth overall).

== Track list ==
CD
No.	Title	Length
1.	"Ven"	3:07
2.	"No se donde voy"	3:38
3.	"Si no estas"	3:00
4.	"Volver a empezar"	3:53
5.	"Quien te crees"	3:41
6.	"La voz de mi conciencia"	3:34
7.	"Gente"	3:31
8.	"Mas alla del bien y el mal"	4:04
9.	"Miel en los labios"	3:19
10.	"Me he cansado de esperar"	3:20
11.	"No voy a cambiar"	2:56
12.	"No hay vuelta atras"	4:16
13.	"Enseñame a olvidar"	3:45

== Reception ==
To date the album has been the second most commercially successful album of the group in Spain, reaching a peak of 3 on the Spanish Albums Chart, beating their self-titled first album, which reached a peak of 4, but falling shy of the peak of their second album, which reached number 2.

== Singles ==
=== Si no estas ===
«Si no estás» ("Without you") is the first single by Spanish pop rock band El Sueño de Morfeo from the album "Cosas que nos hacen sentir bien" 2009.

In September 2009, the single was moved to the review chart PROMUSICAE, where took the 8th place and was awarded as "gold".

Music video

The video was filmed and presented in 2009 in Spain and then worldwide. It was filmed with Warner Music Spain. At the video each member of the group is walking around the city, faces a wire from musical instruments. It is mixed with a film of participants of the bands playing in a room with white walls, which then are destroyed by the musicians. On the last seconds of the video is shown an animated connection of all three wires at the place of the group's play.

=== Gente ===
«Gente» (People) is a song by the Spanish group El Sueño de Morfeo. The third single from the album «Cosas que nos hacen sentir bien» (2009).

Music video

The video was shot in San Sebastian in "Intxaurrondo district" in 2009. At the beginning is shows the band that stuck in a traffic jam among a large number of cars. Around are shown different people: old man with a stick, musicians, playing the accordion, as well as people from other cars. Later members of the group decide to get out of the car and begin to call other people to gather. At the end of the video, the band performs a concert among the cars on artificial stage surrounded by a large number of fans.

=== No se donde voy ===
No se donde voy (I don't know where I go) is a song by El Sueño de Morfeo which became second single from the album «Cosas que nos hacen sentir bien».

Music video

The video portrays a girl suffering from the memories of her childhood. Also a digit "thirteen" is circled in the form of the heart at her calendar. Then she decided to find some green tree at the field where the band is playing and where she had first kiss with a boy. On the way she notices such tree at the picture of a painter and start running to the field. There she finds a box which they earlier hide under ground. Suddenly she realizes that the boyfriend has crashed in a car accident near the tree, but then she wakes up.
