= Better on My Own =

"Better On My Own"

Single by Krista Siegfrids
- Released: 14 August 2015
- Length: 3:44
- Label: Universal Music Finland
- Songwriter(s): Joonas Angeria, Patric Sarin, Krista Siegfrids

Krista Siegfrids singles chronology
"On & Off" (2015)	"Better On My Own" (2015)	"Faller" (2016)

"Better On My Own" is a song recorded by Finnish singer Krista Siegfrids. The song was released as a digital download in Finland on 14 August 2015. The song peaked at number 24 on the Finnish Download Chart and number 74 on the Finnish Airplay Chart.

== Music video ==
A music video to accompany the release of "Better On My Own" was first released onto YouTube on 14 August 2015 at a total length of three minutes and forty-six seconds.

== Track listing ==
Digital download
No.	Title	Length
1.	"Better On My Own"	3:44

== Chart performance ==
=== Weekly charts ===
Chart (2015)	Peak positions
Finland Download (Latauslista)	24
Finland Airplay (Radiosoittolista)	74

== Release history ==
Region	Date	Format	Label
Finland	14 August 2015	Digital download	Universal Music Finland
