= Buscamos Sonrisas =

Studio album by El Sueño de Morfeo
- Released: 14 February 2012 (Spain)
- Recorded: Los Angeles
- Genre: Pop, folk, Celtic
- Label: Warner Music Spain
- Producer: Thom Russo

El Sueño de Morfeo chronology
Cosas que nos hacen sentir bien (2009)	Buscamos Sonrisas (2012)	Todos tenemos un sueño (2013)

Singles from El Sueño de Morfeo
- 1. "Depende De Ti" Released: 15 November 2011; 2. "Lo Mejor Está por Llegar" Released: 2012

Buscamos Sonrisas (English: We Seek Smiles), is the title of El Sueño de Morfeo's fourth studio album, which was released on 14 February 2012. This was confirmed by the group on their Facebook page. The first single, entitled "Depende de ti" premiered on Spanish radio station Radio Valleseco on 3 November 2011 and was available to download on 15 November.

== Track listing ==
Three of the album's songs were confirmed for the album after being performed on their 2011 tour, whilst another four song titles were revealed by El País on 4 January 2012. The full album track listing and pre-order was released on iTunes on 2 February;

Standard edition CD
No.	Title	Length
1.	"Lo Mejor Está por Llegar"	3:59
2.	"Depende de Ti"	3:41
3.	"Un Dia Más"	4:04
4.	"Vuelve (Por Donde Has Venido)"	3:37
5.	"Será Esta Vez"	3:57
6.	"Ni Tu Ni Yo"	3:31
7.	"Despues de Ti"	3:54
8.	"Momentos Dormidos"	4:01
9.	"Corazones"	3:36
10.	"El Coleccionista de Atardeceres"	4:04
11.	"Sonrisas"	3:32
12.	"Decir Adios"	4:05
13.	"La Sensación en de Estar Flotando (Mi)"	3:04
14.	"Llueve (bonus track)"	3:15
15.	"Vamonos (bonus track)"	3:30
