= Spain in the Eurovision Song Contest 2012 =

- Eurovision Song Contest 2012
- Participating broadcaster: Radiotelevisión Española (RTVE)
- Country: Spain
- Selection process: Artist: Internal selection Song: Eurovisión: Pastora Soler
- Selection date: Artist: 21 December 2011; Song: 3 March 2012

Competing entry
- Song: "Quédate conmigo"
- Artist: Pastora Soler
- Songwriters: Thomas G:son; Tony Sánchez-Ohlsson; Erik Bernholm

Placement
- Final result: 10th, 97 points

Participation chronology

Spain was represented at the Eurovision Song Contest 2012 with the song "Quédate conmigo", written by Thomas G:son, Tony Sánchez-Ohlsson, and Erik Bernholm, and performed by Pastora Soler. The Spanish participating broadcaster, Radiotelevisión Española (RTVE), selected its entry through a national final, after having previously selected the performer internally. RTVE announced Soler as its representative in December 2011, while the national final Eurovisión: Pastora Soler was organised in order to select the song Soler would perform. Three songs, one selected through an Internet public vote, competed in the televised show where an in-studio jury and a public televote selected "Quédate conmigo" as the winning song.

As a member of the "Big Five", Spain automatically qualified to compete in the final of the Eurovision Song Contest. Performing in position 19, Spain placed tenth out of the 26 participating countries with 97 points.

== Background ==
Prior to the 2012 contest, Televisión Española (TVE) until 2006, and Radiotelevisión Española (RTVE) since 2007, had participated in the Eurovision Song Contest representing Spain fifty-one times since TVE's first entry in 1961. They have won the contest on two occasions: in 1968 with the song "La, la, la" performed by Massiel and in 1969 with the song "Vivo cantando" performed by Salomé, the latter having won in a four-way tie with France, the Netherlands, and the United Kingdom. They have also finished second four times, with "En un mundo nuevo" by Karina in 1971, "Eres tú" by Mocedades in 1973, "Su canción" by Betty Missiego in 1979, and "Vuelve conmigo" by Anabel Conde in 1995. In 2011, RTVE placed twenty-third with the song "Que me quiten lo bailao" performed by Lucía Pérez.

As part of its duties as participating broadcaster, RTVE organises the selection of its entry in the Eurovision Song Contest and broadcasts the event in the country. RTVE confirmed their intentions to participate at the 2012 contest on 21 December 2012. Between 2007 and 2011, RTVE organised a national final to select both the artist and song. For its 2012 entry, the broadcaster opted to internally select the artist that would compete at the Eurovision Song Contest, while the song would be selected via a national final.

== Before Eurovision ==
=== Artist selection ===
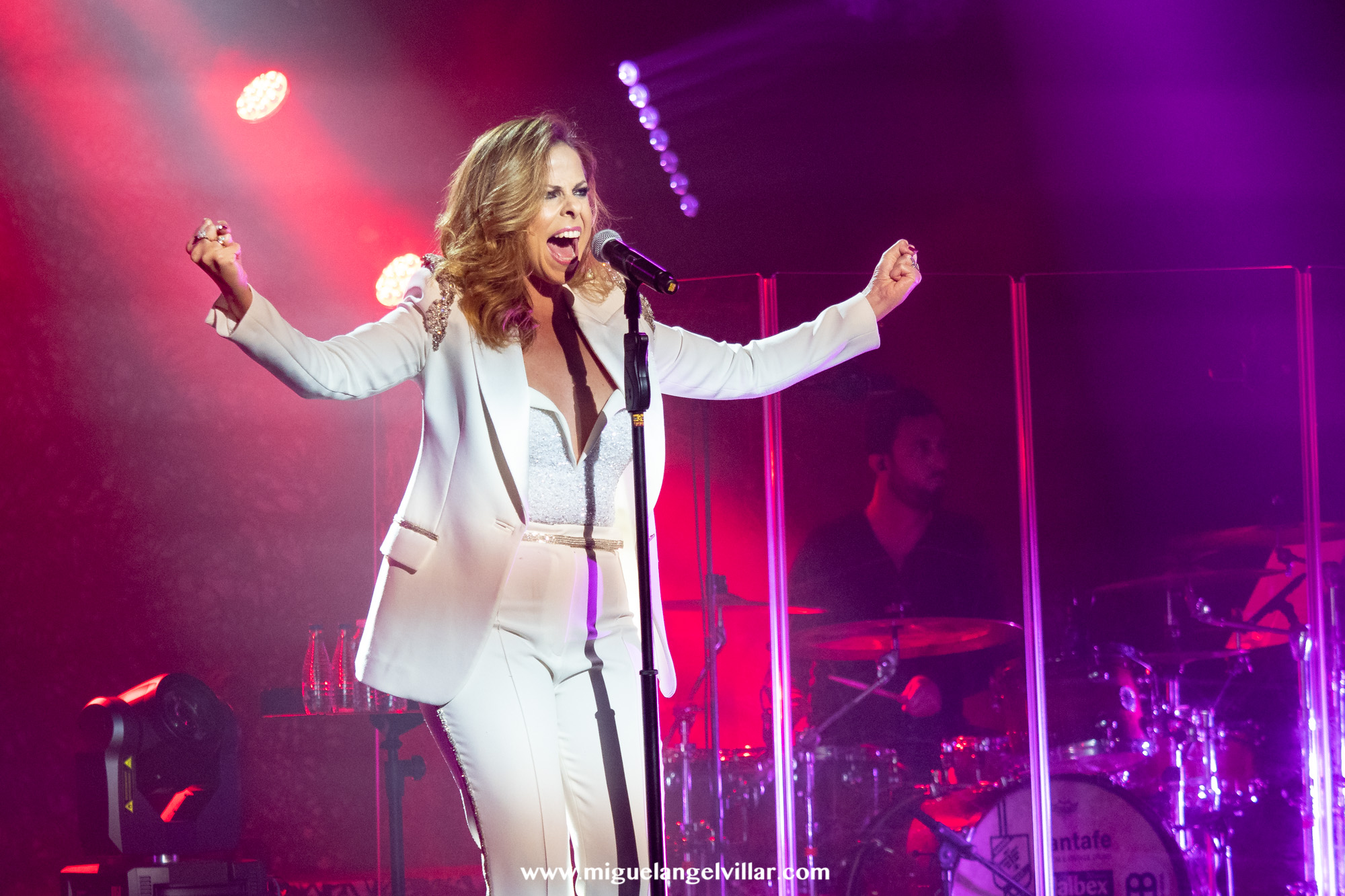
Pastora Soler was internally selected to represent Spain in the Eurovision Song Contest 2012

On 21 December 2011, RTVE announced during the morning show La mañana on La 1 that it had internally selected singer Pastora Soler to represent Spain in Baku. Other artists previously rumoured in the Spanish press to have been selected included Falete and Chenoa.

=== Eurovisión: Pastora Soler ===
During La mañana on 21 December 2011, it was also revealed that the song Pastora Soler would sing would be selected through a national final titled Eurovisión: Pastora Soler. More than 200 songs were submitted by Soler's record label Warner Music Spain and composers who have worked with her in recent years, from which four were selected by Soler who also took into consideration songs from her latest album Una mujer como yo. Two of the songs were selected directly for the national final, while the remaining two songs were selected for an Internet vote and revealed on 15 February 2012 via RTVE's official website rtve.es. Users had until 20 February 2012 to vote for their favourite song and the winning song qualified for Eurovisión: Pastora Soler.

Internet vote – 15–20 February 2012
Song	Songwriter(s)	Votes	Place	Result
"Ahora o nunca"	José Abraham	2,265	1	Qualified
"Me despido de ti"	Marco Deltoni; Xerónimo Manzur; Javier Rodríguez	1,750	2	—N/a

==== Final ====
Eurovisión: Pastora Soler took place on 3 March 2012 at Prado del Rey in Pozuelo de Alarcón (Madrid), hosted by Anne Igartiburu and broadcast on La 1, TVE Internacional, and online via RTVE's official website. All three competing songs were performed by Pastora Soler and the winning song, "Quédate conmigo", was selected through the combination of votes of an in-studio jury (50%) and a public televote held between 22 February and 3 March 2012 (50%). In addition to the performances of the competing entries, guest performers included former Eurovision contestant Sergio Dalma which represented Spain in 1991, and singers David Bustamante and Malú.

The three members of the in-studio jury that evaluated the songs were:

- Óscar Gómez – Music producer and songwriter
- Sole Giménez – Singer
- Franco de Vita – Singer-songwriter

Eurovisión: Pastora Soler – 3 March 2012
R/O	Song	Songwriter(s)	Jury	Televote		Total	Place
R/O	Song	Songwriter(s)	Jury	Percentage	Points	Total	Place
1	"Tu vida es tu vida"	Max Miona; Eleonora Giudizi; Juan María Montes	26	28%	30	56	2
2	"Quédate conmigo"	Thomas G:son; Tony Sánchez-Ohlsson; Erik Bernholm	36	56%	36	72	1
3	"Ahora o nunca"	José Abraham	28	16%	24	52	3

Detailed Jury Votes
R/O	Song	Ó. Gómez	S. Giménez	F. de Vita	Total
1	"Tu vida es tu vida"	10	8	8	26
2	"Quédate conmigo"	12	12	12	36
3	"Ahora o nunca"	8	10	10	28

=== Promotion ===
To specifically promote "Quédate conmigo" as the Spanish Eurovision entry. On 21 April, Pastora Soler performed "Quédate conmigo" during the Eurovision in Concert event which was held at the Melkweg venue in Amsterdam, Netherlands and hosted by Ruth Jacott and Cornald Maas. In addition to her international appearances, she performed the song at an event which took place at the Auditorio riberas del Guadaira in Alcalá de Guadaíra (Seville), in order to present the songs from Una mujer como yo on the same day.

== At Eurovision ==
According to Eurovision rules, all nations with the exceptions of the host country and the "Big Five" (France, Germany, Italy, Spain and the United Kingdom) are required to qualify from one of two semi-finals in order to compete for the final; the top ten countries from each semi-final progress to the final. As a member of the "Big Five", Spain automatically qualified to compete in the final on 26 May 2012. In addition to their participation in the final, Spain is also required to broadcast and vote in one of the two semi-finals. During the semi-final allocation draw on 25 January 2012, Spain was assigned to broadcast and vote in the first semi-final on 22 May 2012.

In Spain, the first semi-final was broadcast on La 2 and the final was broadcast on La 1 with commentary by José María Íñigo. This was the first time since 2008 that both semi-finals were not broadcast in Spain. RTVE appointed Elena S. Sánchez as its spokesperson to announce during the final the Spanish votes. The broadcast of the final was watched by 6.542 million viewers in Spain with a market share of 43.5%. This represented an increase of 11.2% from the previous year with 1.818 million more viewers.

=== Final ===
Pastora Soler took part in technical rehearsal 19 and 20 May, followed by dress rehearsals on 25 and 26 May. This included the jury final on 25 May where the professional juries of each country, responsible for 50 percent of each country's vote, watched and voted on the competing entries. The running order for the semi-finals and final was decided by through another draw on 20 March 2012, and as one of the five wildcard countries, Spain chose to perform in position 19, following the entry from Turkey and before the entry from Germany.

The Spanish performance featured Pastora Soler on stage wearing a white Hellenic-style chiffon dress designed by Spanish designer Cañavate, joined by five backing vocalists in black outfits. The stage lighting, predominantly dark at the beginning, transitioned to bright colours with clear lights, with the LED screens displaying light pink shapes alternating with a dark blue setting, which changed to a scene that resembled fireworks towards the end of the performance. The performance also featured the use of a wind machine. The five backing vocalists that joined Pastora Soler were Antonio Tomás Sepúlveda, Mey Green, Miguel Antelo, Rebeca Rods and Sheila Blanco. Spain placed tenth in the final, scoring 97 points.

=== Voting ===
Voting during the three shows consisted of 50 percent public televoting and 50 percent from a jury deliberation. The jury consisted of five music industry professionals who were citizens of the country they represent. This jury was asked to judge each contestant based on: vocal capacity; the stage performance; the song's composition and originality; and the overall impression by the act. In addition, no member of a national jury could be related in any way to any of the competing acts in such a way that they cannot vote impartially and independently.

Following the release of the full split voting by the EBU after the conclusion of the competition, it was revealed that Spain had placed eighteenth with the public televote and fifth with the jury vote. In the public vote, Spain scored 45 points and in the jury vote the nation scored 154 points.

Below is a breakdown of points awarded to Spain and awarded by Spain in the first semi-final and grand final of the contest, and the breakdown of the jury voting and televoting conducted during the two shows:

==== Points awarded to Spain ====
Points awarded to Spain (Final)
Score	Country
12 points	Portugal
10 points	Israel
8 points	Switzerland; United Kingdom
7 points	
6 points	Austria; Belgium; Cyprus; France; Netherlands; Romania
5 points	Bosnia and Herzegovina
4 points	Estonia; Sweden
3 points	Bulgaria; Finland
2 points	Iceland
1 point	Hungary; San Marino

==== Points awarded by Spain ====
Points awarded by Spain (Semi-final 1)
Score	Country
12 points	Romania
10 points	Moldova
8 points	Cyprus
7 points	Russia
6 points	Iceland
5 points	Ireland
4 points	Albania
3 points	Greece
2 points	Israel
1 point	Belgium

Points awarded by Spain (Final)
Score	Country
12 points	Sweden
10 points	Romania
8 points	Russia
7 points	Moldova
6 points	Estonia
5 points	Cyprus
4 points	Iceland
3 points	Germany
2 points	Ukraine
1 point	Italy
