= Snurra min jord =

Single by Krista Siegfrids
- Released: 26 February 2017
- Recorded: 2016
- Genre: Pop
- Length: 3:05
- Label: Universal Music Group
- Songwriter(s): Krista Siegfrids; Gustaf Svenungsson; Magnus Wallin; Gabriel Alares

Krista Siegfrids singles chronology
"Be Real" (2016)	"Snurra min jord" (2017)	"1995" (2017)

"Snurra min jord" is a song recorded by Finnish singer Krista Siegfrids. The song was released as a digital download in Finland on 26 February 2017. The song peaked at number 27 on the Finnish Download Chart. The song was written by Krista Siegfrids, Gustaf Svenungsson, Magnus Wallin and Gabriel Alares. It took part in Melodifestivalen 2017, and placed seventh in the third semi-final on 18 February 2017.

== Track listing ==
Digital download
No.	Title	Length
1.	"Snurra min jord"	3:05

== Chart performance ==
Chart (2017)	Peak positions
Finland Download (Latauslista)	27

== Release history ==
Region	Date	Format	Label
Finland	26 February 2017	Digital download	Universal Music Group
