= Be Real (Krista Siegfrids song) =

Single by Krista Siegfrids
- Released: 2 November 2016
- Recorded: 2016
- Genre: Dance-pop
- Length: 3:00
- Label: Universal Music Finland
- Songwriter(s): Brandon Bauer: Topi Latukka; Leo Salminen; Krista Siegfrids

Krista Siegfrids singles chronology
"Faller" (2015)	"Be Real" (2016)	"Snurra min jord" (2017)

"Be Real" is a song recorded by Finnish singer Krista Siegfrids. The song was released as a digital download in Finland on 2 November 2016. The song peaked at number 80 on the Finnish Airplay Chart.

== Music video ==
A music video to accompany the release of "Be Real" was first released onto YouTube on 18 November 2016 at a total length of three minutes and four seconds.

== Track listing ==
Digital download
No.	Title	Length
1.	"Be Real"	3:00

== Chart performance ==
Chart (2016)	Peak positions
Finland Airplay (Radiosoittolista)	80

== Release history ==
Region	Date	Format	Label
Finland	2 November 2016	Digital download	Universal Music Finland
