= Tony Sánchez-Ohlsson =

Spanish songwriter (born 1974)

Antonio Juan "Tony" Sánchez-Ohlsson Vega (born 11 January 1974 in Las Palmas de Gran Canaria) is a Spanish music producer and songwriter.

Sánchez-Ohlsson began classical music training at the age of eight. He began his professional career in music in 2007 by the hand of his mentor Thomas G:son, with whom he co-authored the Spanish entry in the Eurovision Song Contest 2007, "I Love You Mi Vida", performed by boy band D'Nash. Subsequently, Sánchez-Ohlsson has written a number of entries for Spain's national finals and has reached the Eurovision Song Contest another two times, in 2012 with "Quédate conmigo" performed by Pastora Soler, and in 2015 with "Amanecer" performed by Edurne. As a writer and producer, he has worked with a number of well-known Spanish artists including Auryn, Marta Sánchez or Sweet California, and he has collaborated with international songwriters like Ina Wroldsen and Claudia Brant.

== Discography ==
Albums produced by Sánchez-Ohlsson include:

- Like a Superstar by Venus (2010)
- Conóceme by Pastora Soler (2013) (#2 Spain)
- Anti-Héroes by Auryn (2013) (#1 Spain)
- Break of Day by Sweet California (2014) (#1 Spain)
- Circus Avenue by Auryn (2014) (#1 Spain)
- Chalk Dreams by Carlos Marco (2017) (#1 Spain)

A selective list of songs written by Sánchez-Ohlsson includes:

- "Todo está en tu mente" by Coral Segovia (2008)
- "En una vida" by Coral Segovia (2010)
- "Breathe Me In" by Marta Sánchez and Anamor (2010)
- "I Don't Think So" by Auryn (2012)
- "Te despertaré" by Pastora Soler (2013)
- "This Is The Life" by Sweet California (2014)
- "Vuelvo a ser la rara" by Sweet California (2014)
- "Comprende (It's Over)" by Sweet California (2014)
- "Más (Run)" by Brequette (2014)
- "I Don't Wanna Take It Slow" by Amelie (2014)
- "Saturday I'm in Love" by Auryn (2014)
- "Contigo" by Mirela (2017)
- "Set the Skies on Fire" by Cristina Vasiu (2017)
- "La tormenta" by Pastora Soler (2017)
- "Vuelves a la vida" by Pastora Soler (2017)
- "Invencible" by Pastora Soler (2017)
- "Que hablen de mí" by Pastora Soler (2021)
- "Rascacielos" by Pastora Soler (2022)
- "Del cielo a mi corazón" by Pastora Soler (2022)
- "Humana" by Pastora Soler (2021)

Sánchez-Ohlsson co-wrote three Eurovision songs:

- "I Love You Mi Vida", the Spanish entry in the Eurovision Song Contest 2007 by D'Nash (Placed 20th with 43 points)
- "Quédate conmigo", the Spanish entry in the Eurovision Song Contest 2012 by Pastora Soler (Placed 10th with 97 points)
- "Amanecer", the Spanish entry in the Eurovision Song Contest 2015 by Edurne (Placed 21st with 15 points)
