= Quédate conmigo =

2012 song by Pastora Soler

Single by Pastora Soler

from the album Una mujer como yo: Versión Eurovisión
- Language: Spanish
- Released: 28 February 2012
- Genre: Pop
- Length: 3:04
- Label: Warner Music Spain
- Composers: Thomas G:son; Tony Sánchez-Ohlsson; Erik Bernholm
- Lyricist: Tony Sánchez-Ohlsson

Pastora Soler singles chronology
"Demasiado amor" (2011)	"Quédate conmigo" (2012)	"Vamos" (2012)

Music video
- "Quédate conmigo" on YouTube

Eurovision Song Contest 2012 entry
- Country: Spain
- Artist: Pastora Soler
- Language: Spanish
- Composers: Thomas G:son; Tony Sánchez-Ohlsson; Erik Bernholm
- Lyricist: Tony Sánchez-Ohlsson

Finals performance
- Final result: 10th
- Final points: 97

Entry chronology
- ◄ "Que me quiten lo bailao" (2011)
- "Contigo hasta el final" (2013) ►

Official performance video
- "Quédate conmigo" (final) on YouTube

"Quédate conmigo" (Spanish pronunciation: [ˈkeðate komˈmiɣo], "Stay with me") is a song recorded by Spanish singer Pastora Soler with music composed by Thomas G:son, Tony Sánchez-Ohlsson, and Erik Bernholm and lyrics written by Sánchez-Ohlsson. It represented Spain in the Eurovision Song Contest 2012, placing tenth.

== Background ==
=== Conception ===
"Quédate conmigo" was composed by Thomas G:son, Tony Sánchez-Ohlsson, and Erik Bernholm, with lyrics by Sánchez-Ohlsson.

=== Selection ===
On 21 December 2011, Radiotelevisión Española (RTVE) announced that it had internally selected Pastora Soler as its performer for the 57th edition of the Eurovision Song Contest. On 3 March 2012, "Quédate conmigo", "Tu vida es tu vida", and "Ahora o nunca" competed in a three-song national final organized by RTVE, and aired on La 1 of Televisión Española, to select the song Soler would perform in the contest. "Quédate conmigo", and "Tu vida es tu vida", had been directly selected by Soler, whereas "Ahora o nunca" had been selected through an online vote over "Me despido de ti".

"Voy a quedarme" won the competition so it became the Spanish entry for Eurovision. Unlike "Tu vida es tu vida", "Quédate conmigo" was not a song from Soler's latest album Una mujer como yo, she chose it from over 200 proposals she received through her record company. According to Soler, it became her favourite the moment she listened to it.

=== Release ===
The song was released in its first version in Spain on digital platforms on 28 February 2012, both as a single and as part of a 4-track EP, Especial Eurovisión, containing her candidate songs for Eurovision.

The final Eurovision version of the song, with polished production, was included in a special reissue of Una mujer como yo, Soler's latest album, which was re-released on 27 March 2012. This version was also released as a single on digital platforms on 30 March 2012 as "Quédate conmigo (Versión Bakú)".

Soler recorded an English-language version of the song, "Stay With Me", which was released on digital platforms on 24 July 2012.

=== Music video ===
RTVE premiered the official music video of the song on 19 March 2012. The video focuses on Pastora Soler, with medium shots and close-ups of her against a black backdrop. These images are alternated with a couple of dancers. The music video served to introduce the final version of the song for the Eurovision Song Contest.

=== Eurovision ===
On 26 May 2012, the grand final of the Eurovision Song Contest was held in the Baku Crystal Hall in Baku hosted by İctimai Television (İTV) and broadcast live throughout the continent. Soler performed "Quédate conmigo" nineteenth on the night, following Turkey's "Love Me Back" by Can Bonomo and preceding Germany's "Standing Still" by Roman Lob.

At the close of voting, it had received 97 points, placing tenth in a field of twenty-six, achieving the first top 10 result for Spain since 2004. The song was succeeded as Spanish entry at the 2013 contest by "Contigo hasta el final" by El Sueño de Morfeo.

== Charts ==
=== Weekly charts ===
Chart (2012)	Peak position
Belgium (Ultratip Flanders)	76
Spain Singles (PROMUSICAE)	6
Spain Airplay (PROMUSICAE)	40

=== Year-end charts ===
Chart (2012)	Position
Spain (PROMUSICAE)	35

== Legacy ==
=== Cover versions ===
- In 2013, Rafa Blas, known for winning the first season of La Voz aired on Telecinco, included a cover of the song in his debut studio album Mi Voz.

=== Other performances ===
- On 24 July 2016, María Jimena sang the song in the Knockout stage of season five of La Voz... México aired on Las Estrellas.
- On 4 December 2017, Nerea performed the song on Gala 6 of season nine of Operación Triunfo aired on La 1 of Televisión Española, in the presence of Soler herself.
- In the show La mejor canción jamás cantada aired on La 1 of Televisión Española to choose by popular vote the best Spanish song ever sung, Agoney performed "Quédate conmigo" in the episode dedicated to the 2010s, aired on 29 March 2019, winning the episode competition. In the grand final episode, aired on 5 April 2019, in which the winner song of each episode dedicated to each of the previous seven decades competed, the song was performed by Gerónimo Rauch placing sixth in the overall competition.

=== Impersonations ===
- In the ninth episode of the third season of Tu cara me suena aired on 19 December 2013 on Antena 3, Melody impersonated Soler singing "Quédate conmigo".
- In the ninth episode of Tu cara me suena mini aired on 6 November 2014 on Antena 3, Carla Núñez impersonated Soler singing "Quédate conmigo" replicating her performance at Eurovision.
- In the sixteenth episode of the sixth season of Tu cara me suena aired on 2 February 2018 on Antena 3, Diana Navarro impersonated Soler singing "Quédate conmigo" replicating her performance at Eurovision, in the presence of Soler herself.
