= Can You See Me? (Krista Siegfrids song) =

Single by Krista Siegfrids

from the album Ding Dong!
- Released: 30 September 2013
- Recorded: 2012
- Genre: Dance-pop
- Length: 3:53
- Label: Universal Music Finland
- Songwriters: Krista Siegfrids; Erik Nyholm

Krista Siegfrids singles chronology
"Amen!" (2013)	"Can You See Me?" (2013)	"Cinderella" (2014)

"Can You See Me?" is a song recorded by Finnish singer Krista Siegfrids. The song was released on 30 September 2013 as the third and final single from her debut studio album Ding Dong! (2013). The song was written by Krista Siegfrids and Erik Nyholm. The song peaked at number 25 on the Finnish Download Chart and number 30 on the Finnish Airplay Chart.

== Music video ==
A music video to accompany the release of "Can You See Me?" was first released onto YouTube on 30 September 2013 at a total length of three minutes and forty-nine seconds.

== Track listing ==
Digital download
No.	Title	Length
1.	"Can You See Me?"	3:53

== Charts ==
Weekly chart performance
Chart (2013)	Peak positions
Finland Download (Latauslista)	25
Finland Airplay (Radiosoittolista)	30

== Release history ==
Region	Date	Format	Label
Finland	30 September 2013	Digital download	Universal Music Finland
