= Krista Siegfrids =

Finnish singer

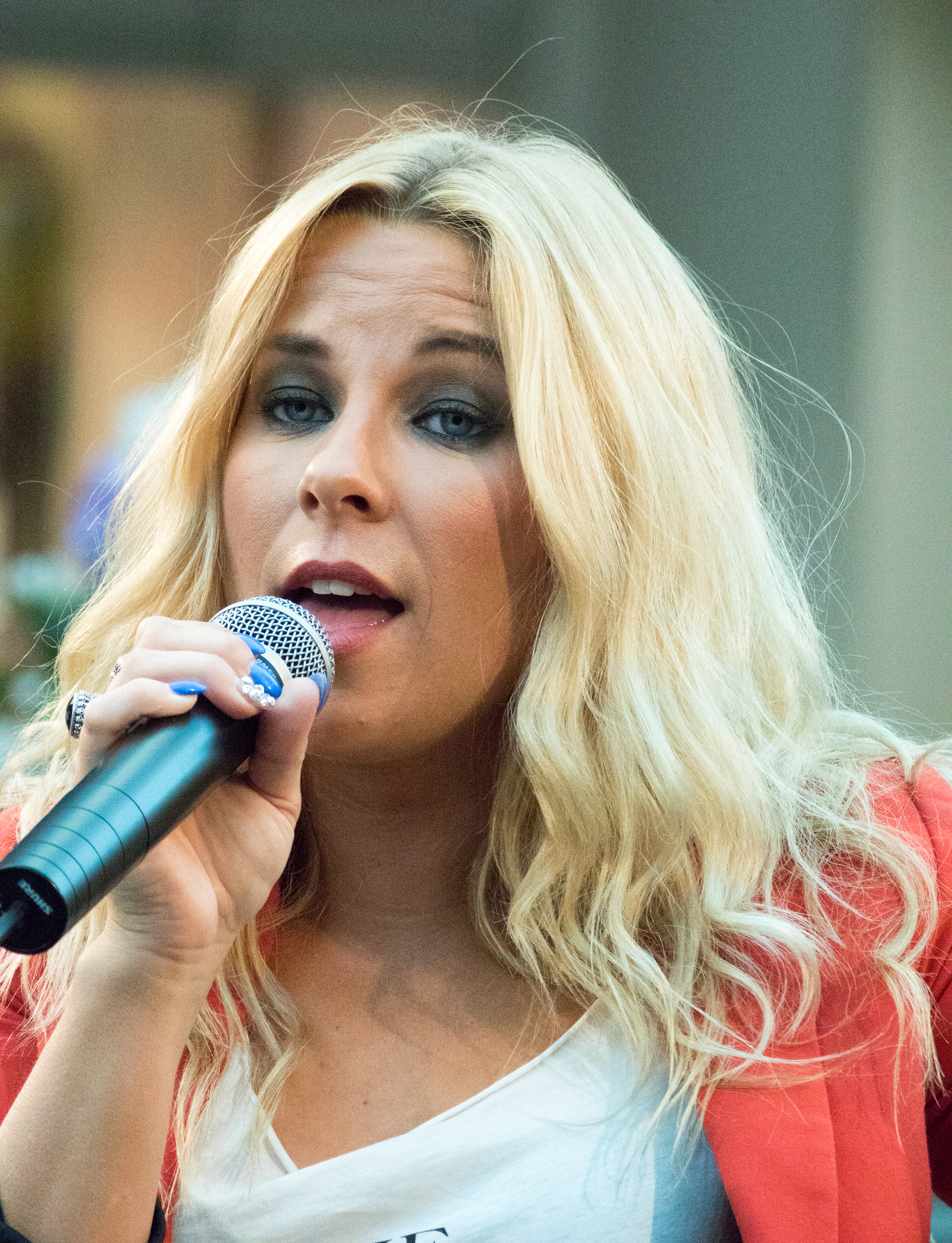
- Siegfrids in 2015

Background information
- Born: Kristin Siegfrids; 1985 (age 40–41); Kaskinen, Finland
- Genre: Electropop
- Occupations: Singer; television presenter
- Years active: 2009–present
- Labels: UMG; Stereoscope Scandinavia
- Website: kristasiegfrids.com

Siegfrids presenting herself and her Eurovision song Marry Me

Kristin "Krista" Siegfrids (born 1985) is a Finnish singer and television presenter. She represented Finland in the Eurovision Song Contest 2013 with her entry "Marry Me". Siegfrids' debut album, named Ding Dong!, was released in May 2013. As a television presenter, she hosted Uuden Musiikin Kilpailu from 2016 to 2020.

== Early life and education ==
Kristin Siegfrids, known as "Krista", was born in 1985. She has three siblings. Her family is one of the Swedish-speaking minority in Kaskinen in western Finland. Her mother tongue is Swedish, though Siegfrids also speaks fluent Finnish and English. She studied in Vaasa to be a teacher.

== Career ==
=== 2009–2012: Daisy Jack and The Voice ===
Siegfrids started her career with her band Daisy Jack in 2009. Their first single was Perfect Crime, released in October 2011. She achieved her first musical role in the musical, Play Me (2009–2010) at the Swedish Theatre in Helsinki. Her next major career step was to be cast in the rock musical Muskettisoturit, (The Three Musketeers, 2011) at the Finnish Peacock Theatre in Helsinki. Siegfrids participated in the first season of The Voice of Finland (2011–2012) but was dropped in the semifinals.

=== 2013–2015: Eurovision Song Contest and Ding Dong! ===
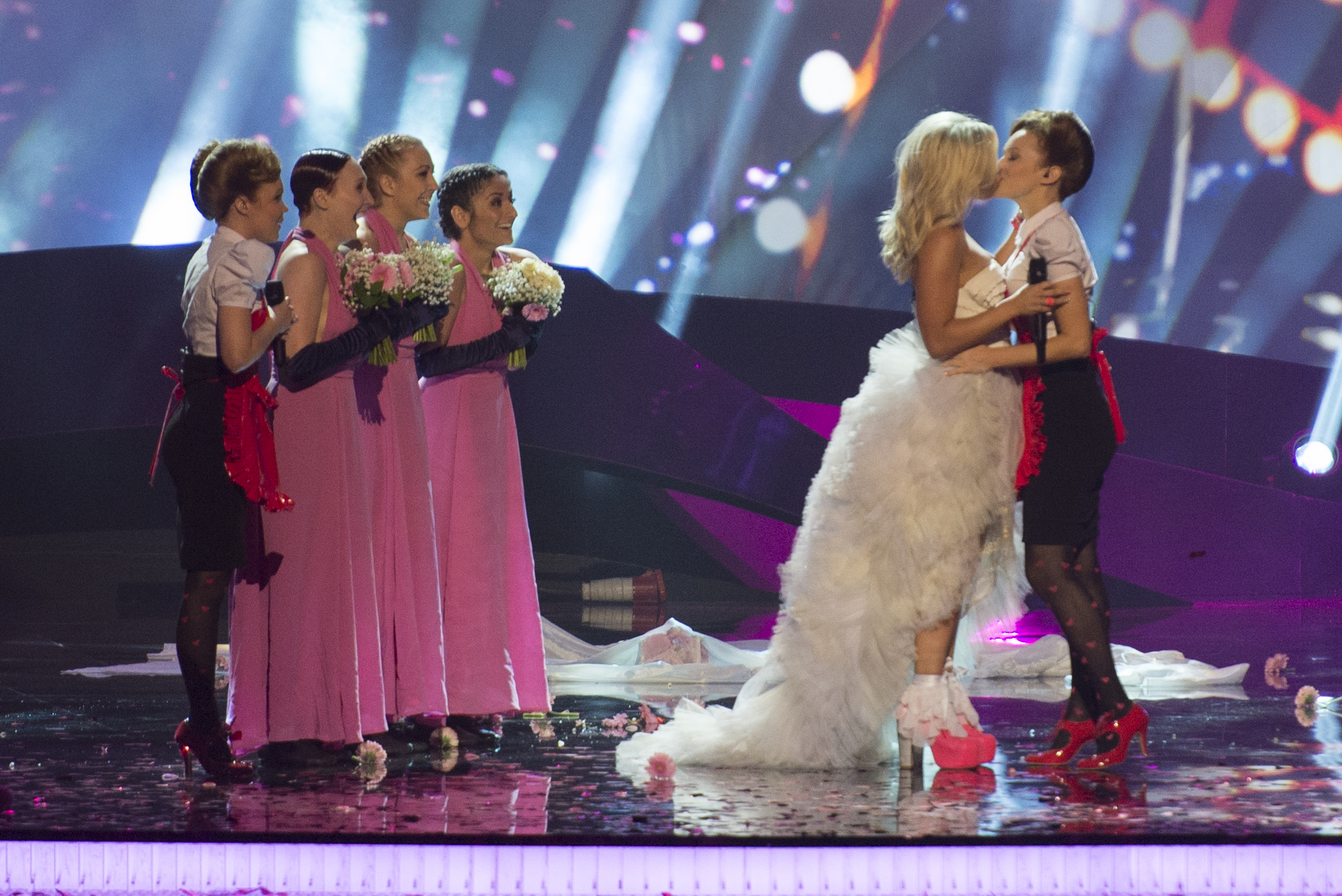
Siegfrids' controversial Eurovision kiss

Siegfrids participated in Uuden Musiikin Kilpailu 2013 for the Eurovision Song Contest 2013 with the song "Marry Me". The 27-year-old Siegfrids won the contest held at Barona Areena by attaining the maximum vote of both the public and judges. She was elected to represent Finland in Malmö. During her performance, she shared a kiss with one of the female dancers on stage. According to Siegfrids, the act was a part of the show and urged Finland to legalize same-sex marriage. On 16 May, her entry made it to the final of the Eurovision on 18 May. However, in the finals it finished 24th out of the 26 countries with a total of 13 points.

According to the then Executive Supervisor of the Eurovision Song Contest, Jon Ola Sand, Turkey had announced in November that it would withdraw from the Eurovision Song Contest 2013, being one of four countries to do so. Though the Turkish television channel TRT promised to still broadcast the contest, they eventually cancelled broadcasting the contest over what LGBT activists alleged was fears of Siegfrids' promised lesbian kiss. When China broadcast the Eurovision Song Contest in October 2013, officials aired Siegfrid's performance but removed the kiss as a result of the television censorship in China and violation of Chinese ethics, sparking outrage among Eurovision fans in the country.

Siegfrids' debut album, Ding Dong!, was released on 10 May 2013. Later, it was announced that she would be a guest on Big Brother's Bit on the Side, a spin-off of the British version of Big Brother. She represented Finland in the Sopot Festival in concert "Top of the Top" on 23 August 2013 with her entry "Marry Me". Siegfrieds was the spokesperson for Finland in the Eurovision Song Contest 2015 in Vienna and gave the top mark of twelve points to Sweden's Måns Zelmerlöw and his song "Heroes", which went on to win the contest.

=== 2016–present: Melodifestivalen and Uuden Musiikin Kilpailu ===
Siegfrids has presented Uuden Musiikin Kilpailu, the Finnish national selection show for Eurovision from 2016 until 2020. At the same time she participated in the Swedish national selection show Melodifestivalen 2016 with the song "Faller", but did not advance from second semifinal after placing fifth. In September, she signed a contract with Universal Music Sweden and Stereoscope Scandinavia. She participated in third semifinal Melodifestivalen 2017 with the song "Snurra min jord", but did not advance after placing seventh.

For the Eurovision Song Contest 2021, she hosted Krista Calling, a backstage series broadcast on Eurovision's official YouTube channel.

== Personal life ==
Siegfrids was married to Finnish radio presenter and stand-up comedian Janne Grönroos from 2017 to 2019. As of 2020, she lives in Amsterdam, Netherlands, with her Dutch boyfriend. They have a daughter born in 2020.

== Discography ==
=== Albums ===
Title	Details	Peak chart positions
Title	Details	FIN
Ding Dong!	Released: 10 May 2013; Labels: Universal Music Finland; Formats: CD, Digital download	19

=== Singles ===
==== As lead artist ====
Title	Year	Peak chart positions						Album
Title	Year	FIN (DL)	FIN (Air)	GER	IRE	SWE	UK	Album
"Marry Me"	2013	6	—	84	99	50	102	Ding Dong!
"Amen!"	2013	—	—	—	—	—	—	Ding Dong!
"Can You See Me?"	2013	25	30	—	—	—	—	Ding Dong!
"Cinderella"	2014	46	79	—	—	—	—	Non-album singles
"On & Off"	2015	8	8	—	—	—	—	Non-album singles
"Better On My Own"	2015	24	74	—	—	—	—	Non-album singles
"Faller"	2016	—	—	—	—	96	—	Non-album singles
"Be Real"	2016	—	80	—	—	—	—	Non-album singles
"Snurra min jord"	2017	27	—	—	—	110	—	Non-album singles
"1995"	2017	—	—	—	—	—	—	Non-album singles
"Let It Burn"	2019	—	—	—	—	—	—	Non-album singles
"—" denotes single that did not chart or was not released.

==== As featured artist ====
Title	Year	Album
"Bae Bae Beibi" (CatCat featuring Krista Siegfrids)	2018	Non-album single

=== Music videos ===
Title	Year	Link
"Marry Me"	2013	
"Amen!"	2013	
"Can You See Me?"	2013	
"Cinderella"	2014	
"On & Off"	2015	
"Better On My Own"	2015	
"Be Real"	2016	

Awards and achievements
Preceded by Pernilla Karlsson with "När jag blundar"	Finland in the Eurovision Song Contest; 2013	Succeeded by Softengine with "Something Better"
