= El Sueño de Morfeo =

Spanish band

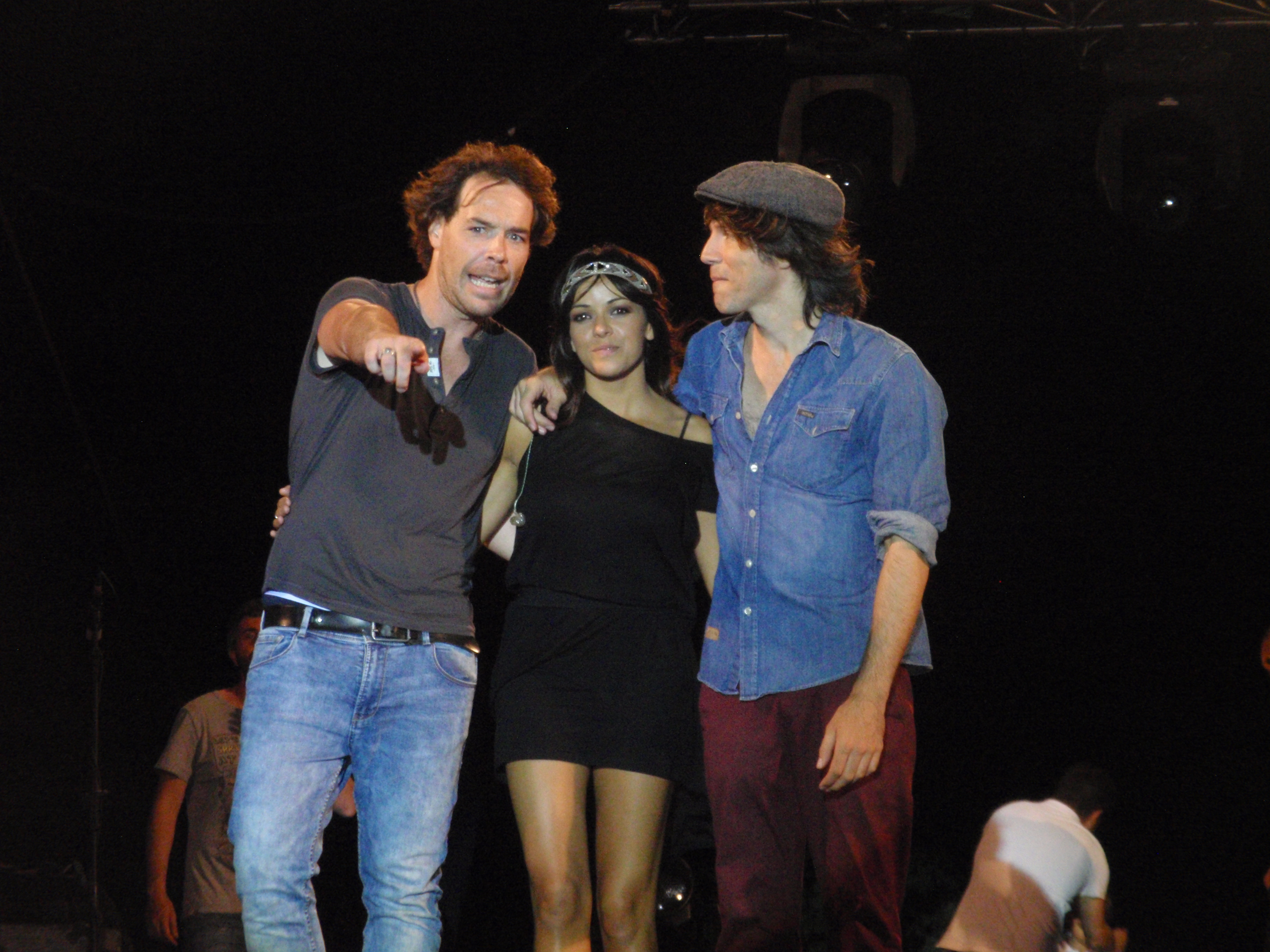
- From left to right: David Feito, Raquel del Rosario and Juan Luis Suárez.

Background information
- Also known as: ESDM
- Origin: Asturias, Spain
- Genres: Pop rock; Celtic; power pop
- Years active: 2002–2014
- Past members: Raquel del Rosario (vocals); David Feito (acoustic guitar and backing vocals); Juan Luis Suárez (electric guitar)

El Sueño de Morfeo presenting their Eurovision Song Contest 2013 song

El Sueño de Morfeo (English: Morpheus' Dream) was a Spanish band from Asturias. Their musical style is pop rock fused with Celtic, folk rock and indie pop elements. They represented Spain at Eurovision Song Contest 2013 with the song "Contigo hasta el final (With you until the end)".

== History ==
=== 2002: Beginnings as Xemá ===
The band was originally formed in 2002 under the name Xemá, with a clear influence of Asturian folk music. Their debut album, Del interior, was released that same year, but failed to generate commercial success. This album was recorded while David Feito, from Asturias himself, and Raquel del Rosario, from the Canary Islands, were at the Colegio Internacional Meres in Siero, Asturias, together with teachers Andrés Alonso (keyboard and accordion) and Antón Fernández (bass guitar and guitar). After the launch of this first album, the band had to decide if they would go on as Xemá or create a new project, opting for the latter.

=== 2003–2006: "1+1 son 7" and El Sueño de Morfeo ===
After Juan Luis Suárez joined David and Raquel in 2003, they decided to find a new name for the band. They considered names like "Pupitre Azul" (Blue Desk) or "La Hija del Caos" (The Daughter of Chaos), and eventually chose El Sueño de Morfeo.

In 2004, Raquel auditioned for the Spanish TV series Los Serrano and gave a demo of their songs. The production company Globomedia asked them to cover the theme song of the series, "1+1 son 7", together with Fran Perea in an episode that would air on 30 July 2004. The group received a significant push in their career from this appearance. They received a recording deal from the music branch of the production company, Globomedia Música.

Their first album as El Sueño de Morfeo, an eponymous album, came out in March 2005, produced by Manel Santisteban. Their first single "Nunca volverá" had been released in January 2005, becoming an instant sales hit in Spain. It ranked third on the year-end singles chart. Their following singles, "Ojos de cielo," "Okupa de tu corazón" and "Esta soy yo" cemented their popularity. They toured Spain with more than 100 concerts and they did a promo tour through Latin America. That same year they took part in a tribute album to Duncan Dhu, where they covered "Una calle de París".

In 2006, they recorded a cover of "I Will Survive" for a Cruzcampo spot, titled "Tómate la vida". Raquel recorded a duet with Diego Martín, "Déjame verte", and El Sueño de Morfeo recorded the Spanish version of "Our Town", "Reencontrar", for the Spanish edition of the Cars Movie Soundtrack. The launch campaign of television channel La Sexta featured them as well, with their song "Sonrisa especial".

=== 2007–2008: Nos vemos en el camino ===
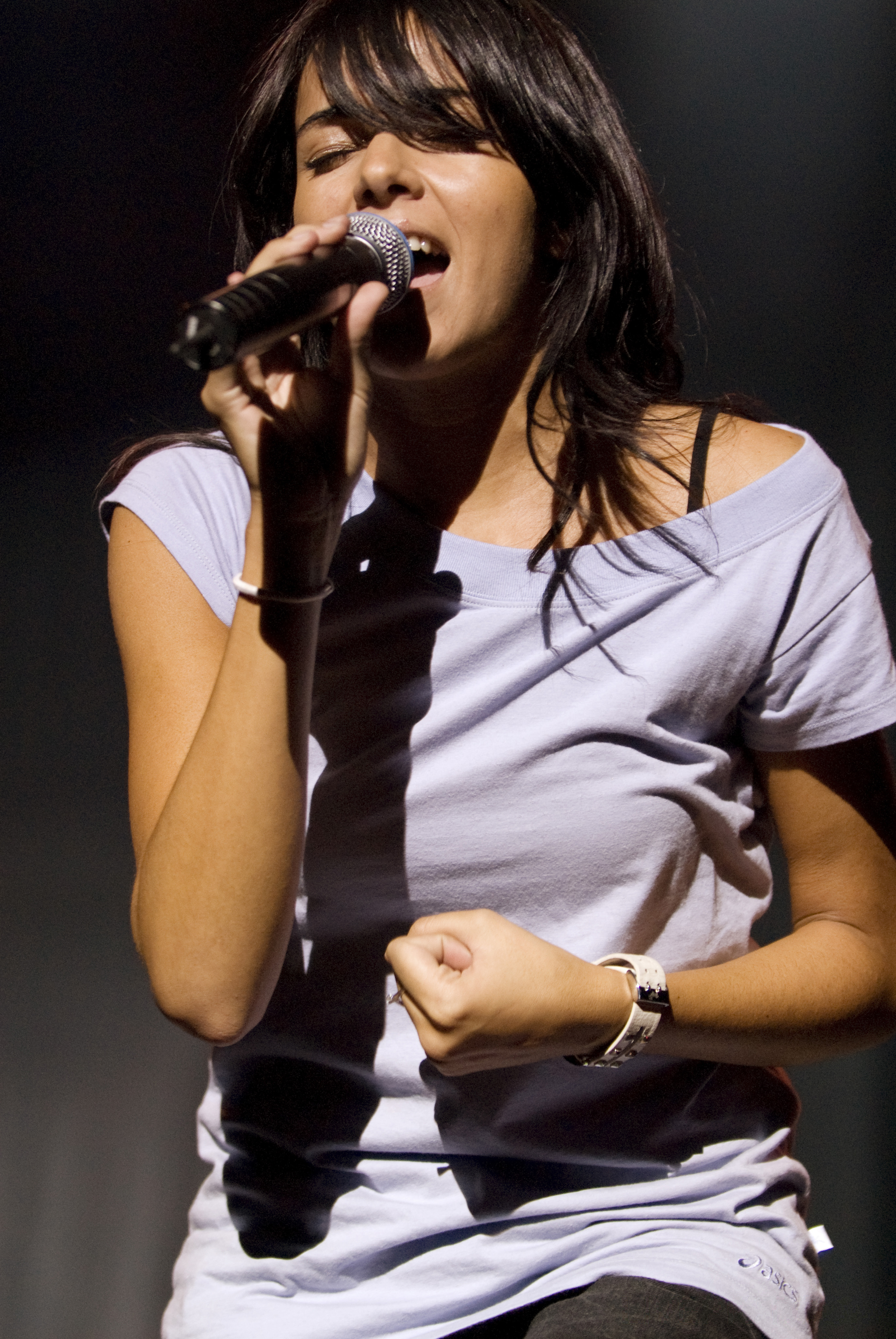
Raquel in an El Sueño de Morfeo concert.

The third studio album, second as El Sueño de Morfeo, Nos vemos en el camino, was recorded during 2006, and released in April 2007. One of the album tracks, "Un tunel entre tú y yo", was presented in a further appearance on Los Serrano. The first single from that album was "Para toda la vida", followed by "Demasiado tarde".

The two following singles were collaborations with Nek: "Para ti sería" and "Chocar". The album was re-issued with a DVD and including new tracks and the collaborations with Nek. The band toured through Spain in 2007 and did a mini-tour in 2008 as well.

=== 2009–2010: Cosas que nos hacen sentir bien ===
In early 2009, they recorded a new album in Los Angeles. Its first single, "Si no estás" was released in April 2009 and the album, Cosas que nos hacen sentir bien, in May 2009. The first single was followed by "No sé dónde voy" and "Gente". The band toured Spain in 2009 and 2010. In 2010, they collaborated with Cómplices, recording one of their most popular songs, "Es por ti", for their 20th anniversary album.

=== 2011–2012: Buscamos sonrisas ===
In early 2011, they collaborated with La Musicalité in a new song, "Cuatro elementos", which was number 9 on the Spanish Singles Chart. In February 2011, Raquel competed together with Luca Barbarossa in the 2011 Sanremo Music Festival, where they finished in 8th place with his composition "Fino in fondo".

Their 4th album as El Sueño de Morfeo, titled Buscamos sonrisas was recorded in Los Angeles, produced by Thom Russo. It was released in February 2012, with the first single "Depende de ti" released in advance in mid-November 2011. After releasing the album, the band began a tour of acoustic concerts through Spain in theatres and auditoriums.

=== 2013: Eurovision Song Contest and Todos tenemos un sueño ===
On 17 December 2012, it was revealed that the band had been internally chosen by national broadcaster RTVE to represent Spain in the Eurovision Song Contest 2013 to be held in Malmö, Sweden, where they competed as ESDM, their acronym. The band presented four candidate songs for the contest. Their Eurovision entry was selected through a special televised live show that was aired on 26 February. "Contigo hasta el final" was chosen by 50% jury and 50% televote. Eventually, in the Eurovision Song Contest hosted in Malmö, Sweden, the song was voted only by 2 countries (Albania and Italy) and ranked 25th from 26 acts participating.

"Contigo hasta el final" and the other three candidate songs for the Eurovision Song Contest were included in a new album titled Todos tenemos un sueño, that was released on 7 May 2013. This album mostly consists of collaborations with famous artists such as Pastora Soler, Álex Ubago, Laura Pausini, La Musicalité and Giorgina covering El Sueño de Morfeo's most popular songs.

== Members ==
- Vocals: Raquel del Rosario
- Acoustic guitar and backing vocals: David Feito Rodríguez
- Electric guitar: Juan Luis Suárez Garrido

Collaborators

- Violin: Belinda Álvarez López
- Bass: Javi Méndez
- Drums: Israel Sánchez
- Bagpipes and whistle: Ricardo Soberado

== Discography ==
=== Albums ===
==== Studio albums ====
List of albums, with selected chart positions and certifications
Title	Album details	Chart positions	Certifications
Title	Album details	SPA	Certifications
Del Interior (as Xemá)	Released: 2002 (Spain); Label: Ventilador Music; Formats: CD, digital download	—	
El Sueño de Morfeo	Released: 3 March 2005 (Spain); Label: Globomedia Música; Formats: CD, digital download	4	PROMUSICAE: Platinum
Nos vemos en el camino	Released: 17 April 2007 (Spain); Label: Globomedia Música; Formats: CD, digital download	2	PROMUSICAE: Gold
Cosas que nos hacen sentir bien	Released: 16 June 2009 (Spain); Label: Warner Music Spain; Formats: CD, digital download	3	
Buscamos sonrisas	Released: 14 February 2012 (Spain); Label: Warner Music Spain; Formats: CD, digital download	16	
Todos tenemos un sueño	Released: 7 May 2013 (Spain); Label: Warner Music Spain; Formats: CD, digital download	18	
"—" denotes albums that did not chart.

=== Singles ===
==== As lead artist ====
List of singles, with selected chart positions and certifications
Single	Year	Peak chart positions		Certifications	Album
Single	Year	SPA	US Latin Tracks	Certifications	Album
"La noche" (as Xemá)	2002	—	—		Del Interior
"Nunca volverá"	2005	1	—		El Sueño de Morfeo
"Ojos de cielo"	2005	—	35		El Sueño de Morfeo
"Okupa de tu corazón"	2005	—	—		El Sueño de Morfeo
"Ésta soy yo"	2006	—	—		El Sueño de Morfeo
"Tómate la vida"	2006	—	—		El Sueño de Morfeo
"Para toda la vida"	2007	—	—		Nos vemos en el camino
"Demasiado tarde"	2007	—	—		Nos vemos en el camino
"Chocar" (feat. Nek)	2008	—	—		Nos vemos en el camino
"Nada es suficiente"	2008	—	—		Nos vemos en el camino
"Si no estás"	2009	8	—	PROMUSICAE: Gold	Cosas que nos hacen sentir bien
"No sé donde voy"	2009	—	—		Cosas que nos hacen sentir bien
"Gente"	2009	—	—		Cosas que nos hacen sentir bien
"Depende de ti"	2011	38	—		Buscamos sonrisas
"Lo mejor está por llegar"	2011	—	—		Buscamos sonrisas
"Contigo hasta el final"	2013	32	—		Todos tenemos un sueño
"—" denotes singles that did not chart or were not released.

==== Featured singles ====
List of albums, with selected chart positions, sales, and certifications
Single	Year	Peak chart positions		Certifications	Album
Single	Year	SPA	US Latin Tracks	Certifications	Album
"Cuatro elementos" (La Musicalité feat. El Sueño de Morfeo)	2011	9	—		Cuatro elementos
"—" denotes singles that did not chart or were not released

=== Other appearances ===
List of other album appearances
Contribution	Year	Album
"Una calle de París"	2005	Cien gaviotas dónde irán... Un tributo a Duncan Dhu
"Déjame verte" (Diego Martin feat. El Sueño de Morfeo)	2005	Vivir no es solo respirar
"Reencontrar"	2006	Cars (Original Soundtrack) – Spanish Version
"Amanecer" (El Sueño de Morfeo & Álex Ubago)	2009	40 años con Nino
"Es por ti" (Cómplices feat. El Sueño de Morfeo)	2010	20 años
"Física o química (Sintonia versión)"	2010	Física o química, Vol. 2 (Original Soundtrack)

== Music videos ==
- «Nunca volverá» (2005)
- «Okupa de tu corazón» (2005)
- «Ojos de cielo» (2005)
- "Dejame verte" (feat. Diego Martin, 2005)
- "Reencontrar" (the Cars soundtrack, 2006)
- «Para ti sería» (feat. Nek) (2007)
- «Ésta soy yo» (2008)
- «Demasiado tarde» (2008)
- «Para toda la vida» (2008)
- «Chocar» (feat. Nek) (2008)
- «Gente» (2009)
- «Si no estás» (2009)
- «No sé donde voy» (2009)
- «Ven» (2010)
- «Cuatro elementos» (feat. La Musicalité, 2010)
- «Depende de ti» (2011)
- «Lo mejor está por llegar» (2012)
- «Contigo hasta el final» (2013)

== Awards and nominations ==
Year	Ceremony	Category	Work	Result
2005	MTV Europe Music Awards	Best Spanish Act	Themselves	Nominated
2006	Premios de la Música	Revelation Songwriters of the Year	"Ojos de cielo"	Won
2006	Premios de la Música	Best Pop Album	El Sueño de Morfeo	Nominated
2006	AMAS Awards	AMAS de Honor	Themselves	Won
2007	MTV Europe Music Awards	Best Spanish Act	Themselves	Nominated
2007	Premios 40 Principales	Best Song	"Para toda la vida"	Nominated
2007	Premios 40 Principales	Best Album	Nos vemos en el camino	Nominated
2007	Premios 40 Principales	Best Group	Themselves	Nominated
2009	Premios 40 Principales	Best Group	Themselves	Nominated

Preceded by Pastora Soler with "Quédate conmigo"	Spain in the Eurovision Song Contest; 2013	Succeeded by Ruth Lorenzo with "Dancing in the Rain"
