= Raquel del Rosario =

Spanish singer (born 1982)

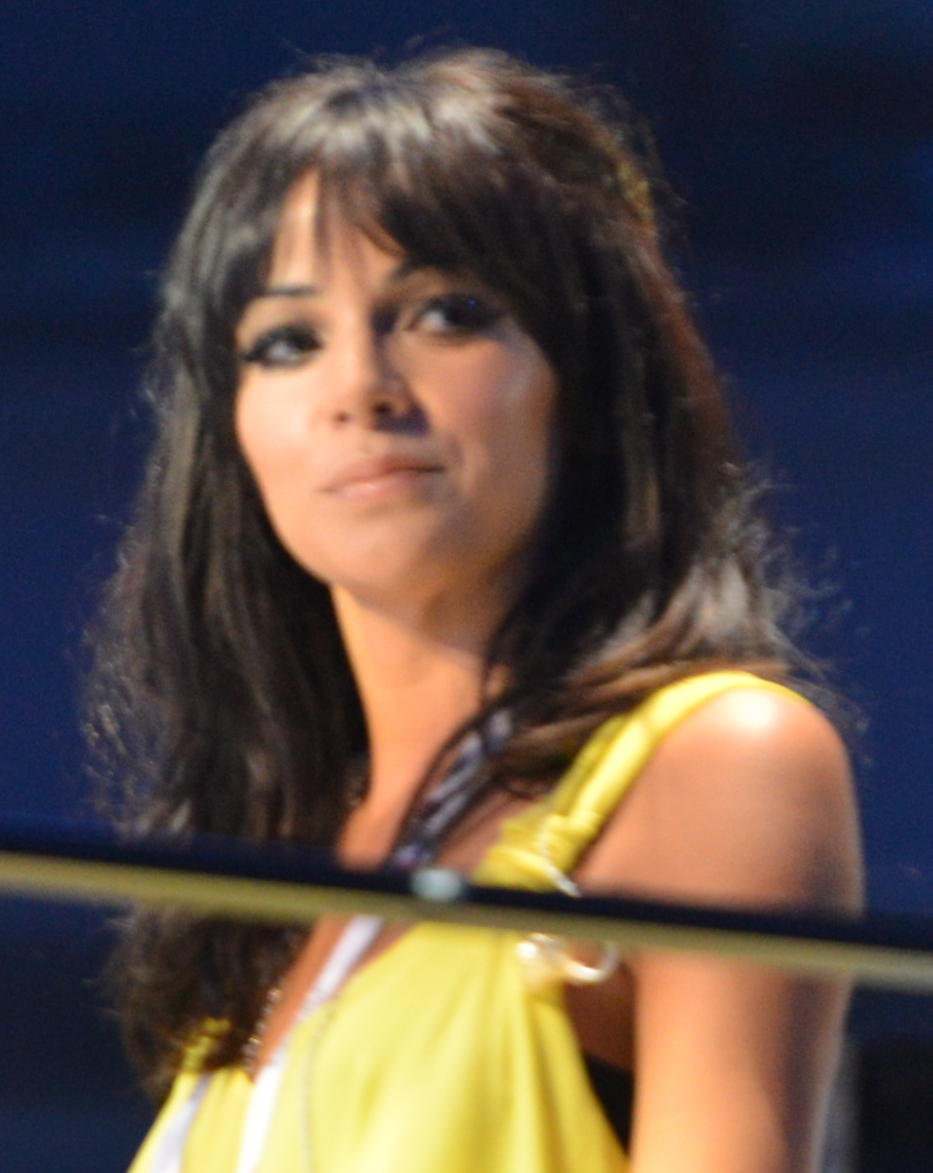
- Raquel at Eurovision Song Contest 2013

Background information
- Born: Raquel del Rosario Macías; 3 November 1982 (age 43); Teror, Gran Canaria, Spain
- Genres: Pop rock; Celtic; power pop
- Occupation: Singer
- Years active: 2000–present
- Formerly of: El Sueño de Morfeo

Raquel del Rosario Macías (Spanish pronunciation: [raˈkel del roˈsaɾjo]; born 3 November 1982) is a Spanish singer who was the lead vocalist of the band El Sueño de Morfeo (Morpheus' Dream).

== Biography ==
Raquel is the second of six children. At the age of 14, she started writing the first of many songs. Raquel, a self-taught musician, was 17 when she met David Feito from Asturias, who headed a Celtic-based music group.

In 2000, Raquel left her native Gran Canaria for Asturias with David and joined his group, Xemà, finally to see their first album released. Soon after Raquel and David met Juan Luis Suárez, and the three created El Sueño de Morfeo. Raquel del Rosario is the vocalist of this Spanish band, and she has written and composed most of their songs with the help of David and Juan.

In 2011, she competed together with Luca Barbarossa in the 2011 Sanremo Music Festival, where they finished in 8th place with the song "Fino in fondo". Then she took part in the Eurovision Song Contest 2013 in Malmö, Sweden, with her band El Sueño De Morfeo and the song "Contigo hasta el final" (With You Until The End), representing Spain. They finished in 25th place in the final, second-to-last.

== Personal life ==
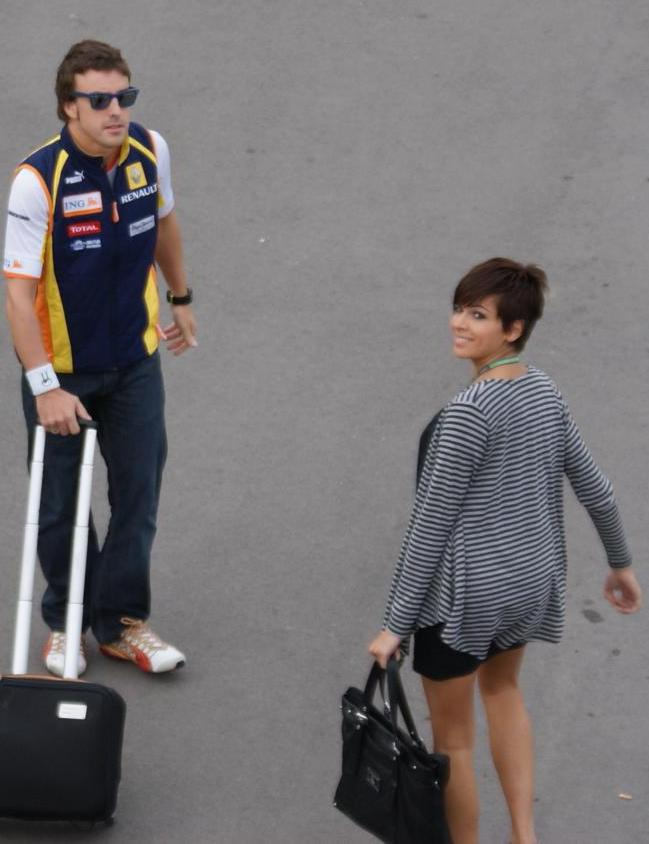
Raquel and her then husband, Fernando Alonso.

In 2006, she married Formula One racing driver Fernando Alonso. They lived in Oxford, England, until they moved to Mont-sur-Rolle, near Lake Geneva, Switzerland in 2006. In February 2010 they moved to Lugano, Switzerland in order to be closer to his new Formula One employer Ferrari. On 20 December 2011 the couple announced their divorce to the press. In 2013, Raquel married Pedro Castro, a Galician photographer and film maker. He first met her while directing the video for her band's song "Si no estás". In 2014, she gave birth to their first child, Leo. In 2016, she gave birth to her second son, Mael.
