= Vuco =

Vuco may refer to:

- Vuco (singer), Croatian singer
- Vuco (surname), surname found in Croatia
- Vučo (surname), surname found in Serbia
