= Vuco (surname) =

Vuco (pronounced [vuːt͡so]) is a surname found in Croatia. Notable people with the name include:

- Brigita Vuco, Croatian singer-songwriter
- Siniša Vuco, Croatian recording artist and singer and songwriter
- Vilibald Vuco, Croatian footballer
