= Croatia in the Eurovision Song Contest 2021 =

- Eurovision Song Contest 2021
- Country: Croatia
- Selection process: Dora 2021
- Selection date: 13 February 2021

Competing entry
- Song: "Tick-Tock"
- Artist: Albina
- Songwriters: Branimir Mihaljević; Max Cinnamon; Tihana Buklijaš Bakić

Placement
- Semi-final result: Failed to qualify (11th)

Participation chronology

Croatia was represented at the Eurovision Song Contest 2021 with the song "Tick-Tock" written by Branimir Mihaljević, Max Cinnamon and Tihana Buklijaš Bakić. The song was performed by Albina. The Croatian broadcaster Croatian Radiotelevision (HRT) organised the national final Dora 2021 to select the Croatian entry for the 2021 contest in Rotterdam, Netherlands. Fourteen entries competed in the national final on 13 February 2021 and "Tick-Tock" performed by Albina was selected as the winner following the combination of votes from ten regional juries and a public televote.

Croatia was drawn to compete in the first semi-final of the Eurovision Song Contest which took place on 18 May 2021. Performing during the show in position 10, "Tick-Tock" was not announced among the top 10 entries of the first semi-final and therefore did not qualify to compete in the final. It was later revealed that Croatia placed eleventh out of the 16 participating countries in the semi-final with 110 points.

== Background ==
Prior to the 2021 contest, Croatia had participated in the Eurovision Song Contest twenty-five times since its first entry in 1993. The nation's best result in the contest was fourth, which it achieved on two occasions: in 1996 with the song "Sveta ljubav" performed by Maja Blagdan and in 1999 with the song "Marija Magdalena" performed by Doris Dragović. Following the introduction of semi-finals in 2004, Croatia had thus far featured in seven finals. Since 2018, the Croatian entries failed to qualify from the semi-finals; the last time Croatia competed in the final was in 2017 with the song "My Friend" performed by Jacques Houdek. In 2019, Croatia failed to qualify to the final with Roko and the song "The Dream". In 2020, Damir Kedžo was set to represent Croatia with the song "Divlji vjetre" before the contest's cancellation.

The Croatian national broadcaster, Croatian Radiotelevision (HRT), broadcasts the event within Croatia and organises the selection process for the nation's entry. HRT confirmed Croatia's participation in the 2021 Eurovision Song Contest on 21 March 2020. Between 1993 and 2011, HRT organised the national final Dora in order to select the Croatian entry for the Eurovision Song Contest. In 2012 and 2013, the broadcaster opted to internally select the entry. After missing the contest in 2014 and 2015, the Croatian broadcaster continued the internal selection procedure between 2016 and 2018. Since 2019, HRT has used Dora to select Croatia's entry, a method that was continued for their 2021 participation.

== Before Eurovision ==
=== Dora 2021 ===
Dora 2021 was the twenty-second edition of the Croatian national selection Dora which selected Croatia's entry for the Eurovision Song Contest 2021. The competition consisted of fourteen entries competing in one final on 13 February 2021 at the Marino Cvetković Sports Hall in Opatija, hosted by Daniela Trbović, Barbara Kolar, Jelena Lešić and Doris Pinčić Rogoznica. The show was broadcast on HRT 1 and HRT 2 as well as online via the broadcaster's YouTube channel and streaming service HRTi.

==== Competing entries ====
On 26 October 2020, HRT opened a submission period where artists and composers were able to submit their entries to the broadcaster with the deadline on 10 December 2020. Unlike in previous editions, songs submitted could be in any language. 140 entries were received by the broadcaster during the submission period. A five-member expert committee consisting of Andrej Babić (HGU, HDS), Hrvoje Prskalo (HDS), Matija Cvek (HGU), Monika Lelas (HRT) and Uršula Tolj (HRT) reviewed the received submissions and selected fourteen artists and songs for the competition. HRT announced the competing entries on 15 December 2020, and among the competing artists were Tony Cetinski, who represented Croatia in the Eurovision Song Contest 1994, and Nina Kraljić, who represented Croatia in the Eurovision Song Contest 2016. The running order of the final was determined by HRT and announced on 18 January 2021.

Artist	Song	Songwriter(s)
Albina	"Tick-Tock"	Branimir Mihaljević, Max Cinnamon, Tihana Buklijaš Bakić
Ashley Colburn and Bojan Jambrošić	"Share the Love"	Ivan Škunca, Ashley Colburn
Bernarda Brunović	"Colors"	Bernarda Brunović, Borislav Milanov
Beta Sudar	"Ma zamisli"	Predrag Martinjak
Brigita Vuco	"Noći pijane"	Brigita Vuco
Cambi	"Zaljubljen"	Marija Mirković
Ella Orešković	"Come This Way"	Siniša Reljić Simba, Ella Orešković
Eric Vidović	"Reci mi"	Eric Vidović
Filip Rudan	"Blind"	Filip Rudan, Antonio Franić, Hrvoje Domazet
Mia Negovetić	"She's Like a Dream"	Mia Negovetić, Linnea Deb, Denniz Jamm, Denise Kertes
Nina Kraljić and Alkonost of Balkan	"Rijeka"	Nina Kraljić, Hana Librenjak, Miki Solus
Sandi Cenov	"Kriv"	Siniša Reljić Simba, Fayo
ToMa	"Ocean of Love"	Adriana Pupavac, Andreas "Beemon" Björkman, Kalle Persson, Tomislav Marić
Tony Cetinski and Kristijan Rahimovski	"Zapjevaj, sloboda je!"	Kristijan Rahimovski

==== Final ====
The final took place on 13 February 2021. The winner, "Tick-Tock" performed by Albina, was determined by a 50/50 combination of votes from ten regional juries and a public televote. The viewers and the juries each had a total of 580 points to award. Each jury group distributed their points as follows: 1-8, 10 and 12 points. The viewer vote was based on the percentage of votes each song achieved through telephone and SMS voting. For example, if a song gained 10% of the viewer vote, then that entry would be awarded 10% of 580 points rounded to the nearest integer: 58 points. Ties were decided in favour of the entry ranked higher by the public televote. In addition to the performances of the competing entries, 2002 Croatian Eurovision entrant Vesna Pisarović performed as the interval act during the show.

Final – 13 February 2021
R/O	Artist	Song	Jury	Televote				Total	Place
R/O	Artist	Song	Jury	Phone	SMS	Total	Points	Total	Place
1	Nina Kraljić and Alkonost of Balkan	"Rijeka"	68	3,745	1,575	5,320	77	145	2
2	Eric Vidović	"Reci mi"	29	659	408	1,067	16	45	10
3	Ella Orešković	"Come This Way"	26	1,425	336	1,761	26	52	9
4	Bernarda Brunović	"Colors"	77	1,131	413	1,544	22	99	7
5	Sandi Cenov	"Kriv"	5	403	82	485	7	12	14
6	ToMa	"Ocean of Love"	64	2,121	574	2,695	39	103	6
7	Filip Rudan	"Blind"	65	3,204	460	3,664	53	118	5
8	Beta Sudar	"Ma zamisli"	8	456	84	540	8	16	12
9	Klapa Cambi	"Zaljubljen"	47	4,488	393	4,881	71	118	4
10	Ashley Colburn and Bojan Jambrošić	"Share the Love"	9	2,237	94	2,331	34	43	11
11	Brigita Vuco	"Noći pijane"	7	504	78	582	8	15	13
12	Mia Negovetić	"She's Like a Dream"	67	3,143	471	3,614	52	119	3
13	Albina	"Tick-Tock"	78	6,609	1,688	8,297	120	198	1
14	Tony Cetinski and Kiki Rahimovski	"Zapjevaj, sloboda je!"	30	2,746	464	3,210	47	77	8

Detailed Regional Jury Votes
R/O	Song	Zagreb	Vukovar	Varaždin and Čakovec	Rijeka	Pula	Osijek	Zadar	Knin and Šibenik	Split	Dubrovnik	Total
1	"Rijeka"	6	8	8	8	5	4	10	10	4	5	68
2	"Reci mi"	1	1	5	6	4	2			3	7	29
3	"Come This Way"	4		2		3	1	5	4	1	6	26
4	"Colors"	7	6	12	12	12	8	6	7	7		77
5	"Kriv"		2					1			2	5
6	"Ocean of Love"	10	3	10	4	8	7	3	6	12	1	64
7	"Blind"	12	12	7	5	7	3	12	2	5		65
8	"Ma zamisli"		4		1	2			1			8
9	"Zaljubljen"			3	10		10		8	8	8	47
10	"Share the Love"				3	1				2	3	9
11	"Noći pijane"	3						4				7
12	"She's Like a Dream"	5	10	6	7	10	6	8	5	6	4	67
13	"Tick-Tock"	8	7	4		6	12	7	12	10	12	78
14	"Zapjevaj, sloboda je!"	2	5	1	2		5	2	3		10	30

Members of the Jury
Jury	Members
Zagreb	Robert Urlić – HRT; Željka Veverec – HDS; Denis Dumančić – HGU
Vukovar	Petar Barić – HRT; Pero Galić – HDS; Branimir Jovanovac – HGU
Varaždin and Čakovec	Danijela Bratić – HRT; Zsa Zsa – HDS; J. R. August – HGU
Rijeka	Albert Petrović – HRT; Antonela Doko – HDS; Damir Martinović Mrle – HGU
Pula	Bruno Krajcar – HRT; Sandro Pettener – HDS; Marijan Jelenić – HGU
Osijek	Marina Ban – HRT; Goran Bošković – HDS; Damir Bačić – HGU
Zadar	Toni Dunatov – HRT; Natali Dizdar – HDS; Jere Šešelja – HGU
Knin and Šibenik	Nenad Tisaj – HRT; Marko Škugor – HDS; Matej Nakić – HGU
Split	Eduard Gracin – HRT; Lorena Bućan – HDS; Saša Antić – HGU
Dubrovnik	Milivoj Kravarović – HRT; Sanin Karamehmedović – HDS; Tibor Karamehmedović – HGU

=== Controversy ===
After the final, Nina Kraljić alleged that there were problems with her rehearsals, where she had to listen to Albina's song in her in-ear headphones instead of her own. She also said that many people couldn't vote for her due to telecommunication problems. Two days later, Kraljić removed her Facebook page as well as her Instagram page.

The next day, the family of another contestant, Bernarda Brunović, also alleged that they received information from Croatian Head of Delegation Uršula Tolj that they could not win because they were on a "blacklist". They also confirmed Nina Kraljić's earlier allegations. Uršula Tolj commented on this a day later, where she confirmed that everything was done right and that there had been no problems with the voting that would have affected the final result. She also dismissed the allegations that a "blacklist" had existed.

== At Eurovision ==
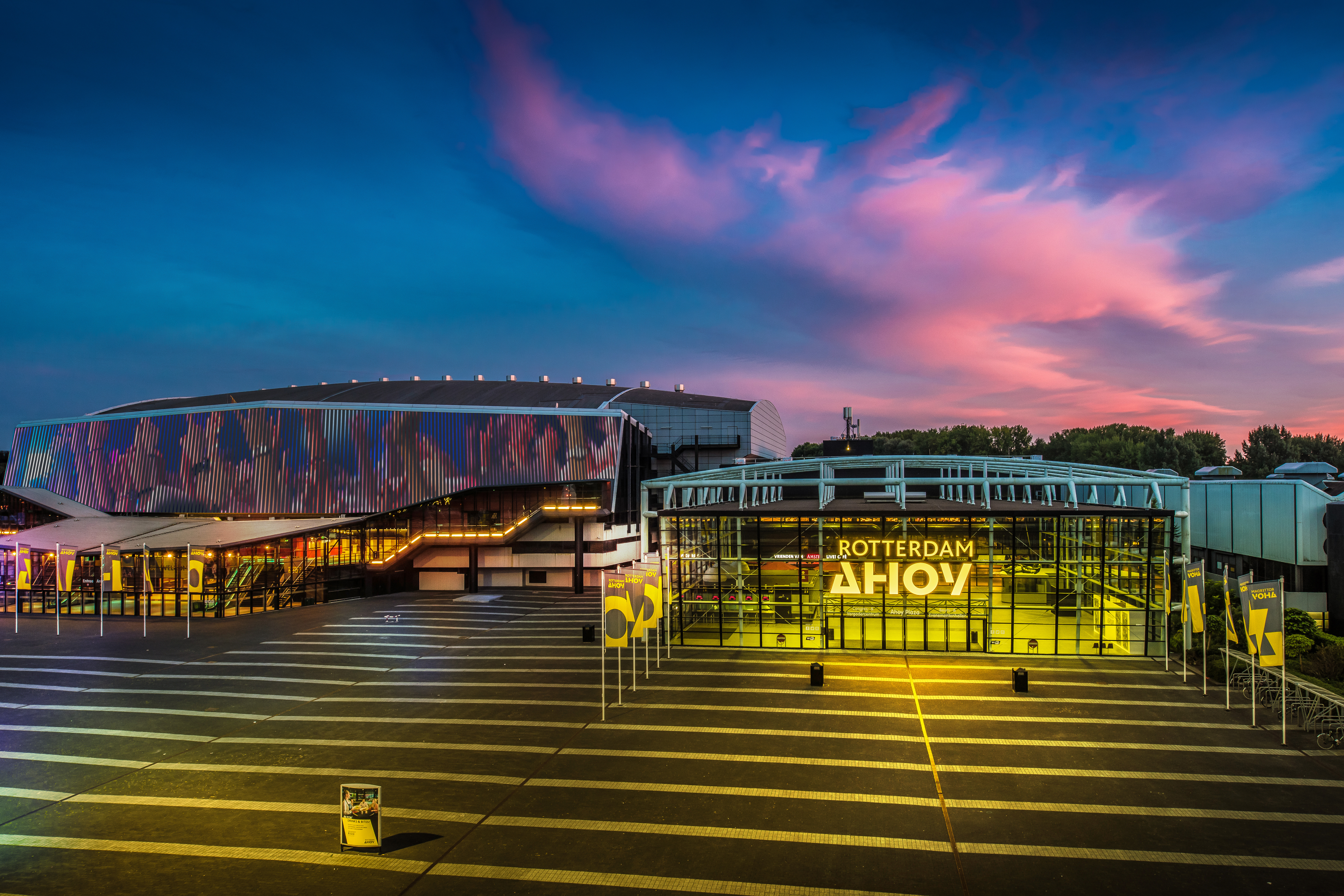
The Eurovision Song Contest 2021 took place at the Rotterdam Ahoy in Rotterdam, Netherlands

According to Eurovision rules, all nations with the exceptions of the host country and the "Big Five" (France, Germany, Italy, Spain and the United Kingdom) are required to qualify from one of two semi-finals in order to compete for the final; the top ten countries from each semi-final progress to the final. The European Broadcasting Union (EBU) split up the competing countries into six different pots based on voting patterns from previous contests, with countries with favourable voting histories put into the same pot. The semi-final allocation draw held for the Eurovision Song Contest 2020 on 28 January 2020 was used for the 2021 contest, which Croatia was placed into the first semi-final, which was held on 18 May 2021, and was scheduled to perform in the second half of the show.

Once all the competing songs for the 2021 contest had been released, the running order for the semi-finals was decided by the shows' producers rather than through another draw, so that similar songs were not placed next to each other. Croatia was set to perform in position 10, following the entry from Norway and before the entry from Belgium.

The two semi-finals and the final were broadcast in Croatia on HRT 1 with commentary by Duško Ćurlić. The three shows were also broadcast via radio on HR 2. The Croatian spokesperson, who announced the top 12-point score awarded by the Croatian jury during the final, was Ivan Dorian Molnar.

=== Semi-final ===
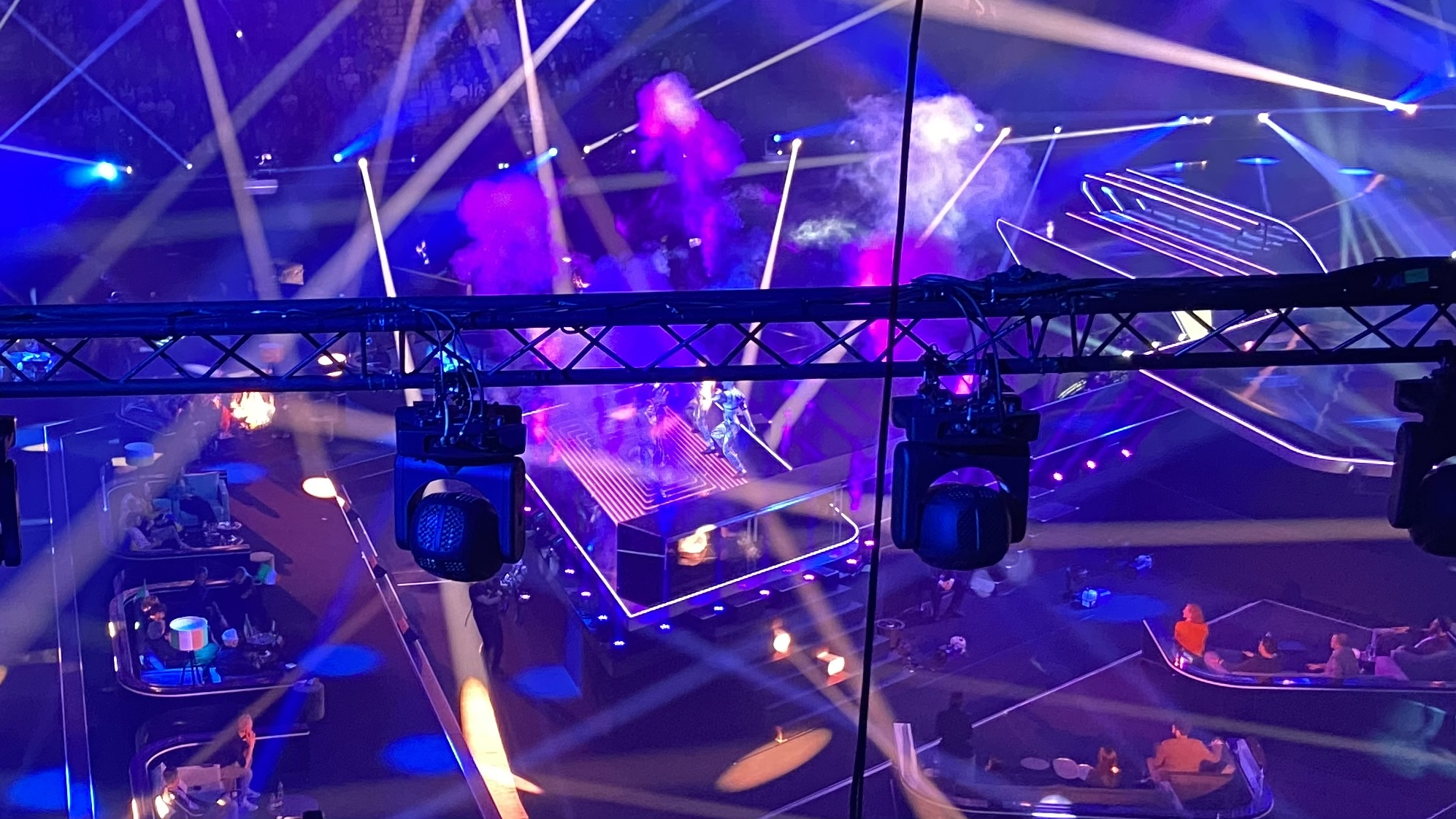
Albina during a rehearsal before the first semi-final

Albina took part in technical rehearsals on 9 and 12 May, followed by dress rehearsals on 17 and 18 May. This included the jury show on 17 May where the professional juries of each country watched and voted on the competing entries.

The Croatian performance featured Albina dressed in a leotard outfit and performing on the stage catwalk and satellite stage. Kraljić's outfit was designed by Stefan Orlić and Juraj Zigman. The stage lighting displayed blue and purple colours with the LED screens and transparent panel projecting neon lights and lyrics of the song. The performance also featured several effects including pyrotechnics, a wind machine and a hologram effect that displayed four Albinas. The creative director of the Croatian performance was Marvin Dietmann, while the choreographer was Helena Janjušević. Albina was joined on stage by four dancers performing choreography with the singer: Devin Juraj, Luciano Plazibat, Marko Marić and Stjepan Cutvarić.

At the end of the show, Croatia was not announced among the top 10 entries in the first semi-final and therefore failed to qualify to compete in the final. It was later revealed that Croatia placed eleventh in the semi-final, receiving a total of 110 points: 53 points from the televoting and 57 points from the juries.

=== Voting ===
Voting during the three shows involved each country awarding two sets of points from 1-8, 10 and 12: one from their professional jury and the other from televoting. Each nation's jury consisted of five music industry professionals who are citizens of the country they represent, with a diversity in gender and age represented. The judges assess each entry based on the performances during the second Dress Rehearsal of each show, which takes place the night before each live show, against a set of criteria including: vocal capacity; the stage performance; the song's composition and originality; and the overall impression by the act. Jury members may only take part in panel once every three years, and are obliged to confirm that they are not connected to any of the participating acts in a way that would impact their ability to vote impartially. Jury members should also vote independently, with no discussion of their vote permitted with other jury members. The exact composition of the professional jury, and the results of each country's jury and televoting were released after the grand final; the individual results from each jury member were also released in an anonymised form.

Below is a breakdown of points awarded to Croatia and awarded by Croatia in the first semi-final and grand final of the contest, and the breakdown of the jury voting and televoting conducted during the two shows:

==== Points awarded to Croatia ====
Points awarded to Croatia (Semi-final 1)
Score	Televote	Jury
12 points	North Macedonia; Slovenia	
10 points		Ireland
8 points		North Macedonia; Ukraine
7 points	Germany; Ireland	Slovenia
6 points		
5 points	Australia	Azerbaijan; Cyprus
4 points		
3 points	Israel	Malta; Russia
2 points	Azerbaijan; Cyprus; Sweden	Germany; Italy
1 point	Norway	Belgium; Israel; Lithuania; Romania

==== Points awarded by Croatia ====
Points awarded by Croatia (Semi-final 1)
Score	Televote	Jury
12 points	Ukraine	Malta
10 points	Russia	Cyprus
8 points	Azerbaijan	Russia
7 points	Malta	Israel
6 points	Cyprus	Lithuania
5 points	Slovenia	Ukraine
4 points	Israel	Belgium
3 points	Lithuania	Romania
2 points	Norway	Australia
1 point	North Macedonia	Sweden

Points awarded by Croatia (Final)
Score	Televote	Jury
12 points	Serbia	Italy
10 points	Italy	Iceland
8 points	Ukraine	Switzerland
7 points	France	Serbia
6 points	Finland	France
5 points	Switzerland	Israel
4 points	Iceland	Russia
3 points	Russia	Malta
2 points	Azerbaijan	Lithuania
1 point	Albania	Portugal

==== Detailed voting results ====
The following members comprised the Croatian jury:

- Denis Dumančić
- Monika Lelas Habanek
- Luka Nižetić
- Tonka
- Nika Turković

Detailed voting results from Croatia (Semi-final 1)
R/O	Country	Jury							Televote	
R/O	Country	Juror A	Juror B	Juror C	Juror D	Juror E	Rank	Points	Rank	Points
01	Lithuania	6	8	4	4	2	5	6	8	3
02	Slovenia	15	6	15	6	9	11		6	5
03	Russia	2	5	8	3	4	3	8	2	10
04	Sweden	7	9	9	8	8	10	1	11	
05	Australia	14	3	10	9	12	9	2	15	
06	North Macedonia	13	12	14	5	10	12		10	1
07	Ireland	12	13	13	14	13	15		14	
08	Cyprus	1	2	11	2	3	2	10	5	6
09	Norway	11	15	5	15	15	13		9	2
10	Croatia									
11	Belgium	9	11	1	13	11	7	4	13	
12	Israel	3	4	2	7	6	4	7	7	4
13	Romania	8	7	7	11	7	8	3	12	
14	Azerbaijan	10	14	12	12	14	14		3	8
15	Ukraine	5	10	3	10	5	6	5	1	12
16	Malta	4	1	6	1	1	1	12	4	7

Detailed voting results from Croatia (Final)
R/O	Country	Jury							Televote	
R/O	Country	Juror A	Juror B	Juror C	Juror D	Juror E	Rank	Points	Rank	Points
01	Cyprus	5	6	17	15	13	11		15	
02	Albania	10	13	12	14	9	12		10	1
03	Israel	4	4	6	6	7	6	5	20	
04	Belgium	15	16	9	24	14	14		23	
05	Russia	3	9	5	11	8	7	4	8	3
06	Malta	7	8	13	3	11	8	3	14	
07	Portugal	13	10	10	4	10	10	1	18	
08	Serbia	6	1	7	7	2	4	7	1	12
09	United Kingdom	25	24	25	26	25	26		24	
10	Greece	23	20	22	21	24	24		21	
11	Switzerland	9	5	1	10	1	3	8	6	5
12	Iceland	14	3	4	1	3	2	10	7	4
13	Spain	22	19	19	25	16	20		25	
14	Moldova	24	26	26	22	23	25		22	
15	Germany	26	25	23	17	22	23		19	
16	Finland	21	17	14	9	19	15		5	6
17	Bulgaria	16	12	15	23	15	17		17	
18	Lithuania	11	11	8	5	6	9	2	12	
19	Ukraine	8	14	11	16	12	13		3	8
20	France	2	7	2	8	5	5	6	4	7
21	Azerbaijan	19	21	16	20	18	19		9	2
22	Norway	20	23	21	18	26	22		13	
23	Netherlands	18	18	18	13	20	18		26	
24	Italy	1	2	3	2	4	1	12	2	10
25	Sweden	12	15	20	12	17	16		11	
26	San Marino	17	22	24	19	21	21		16	
