= Klapa s Mora =

Croatian music ensemble

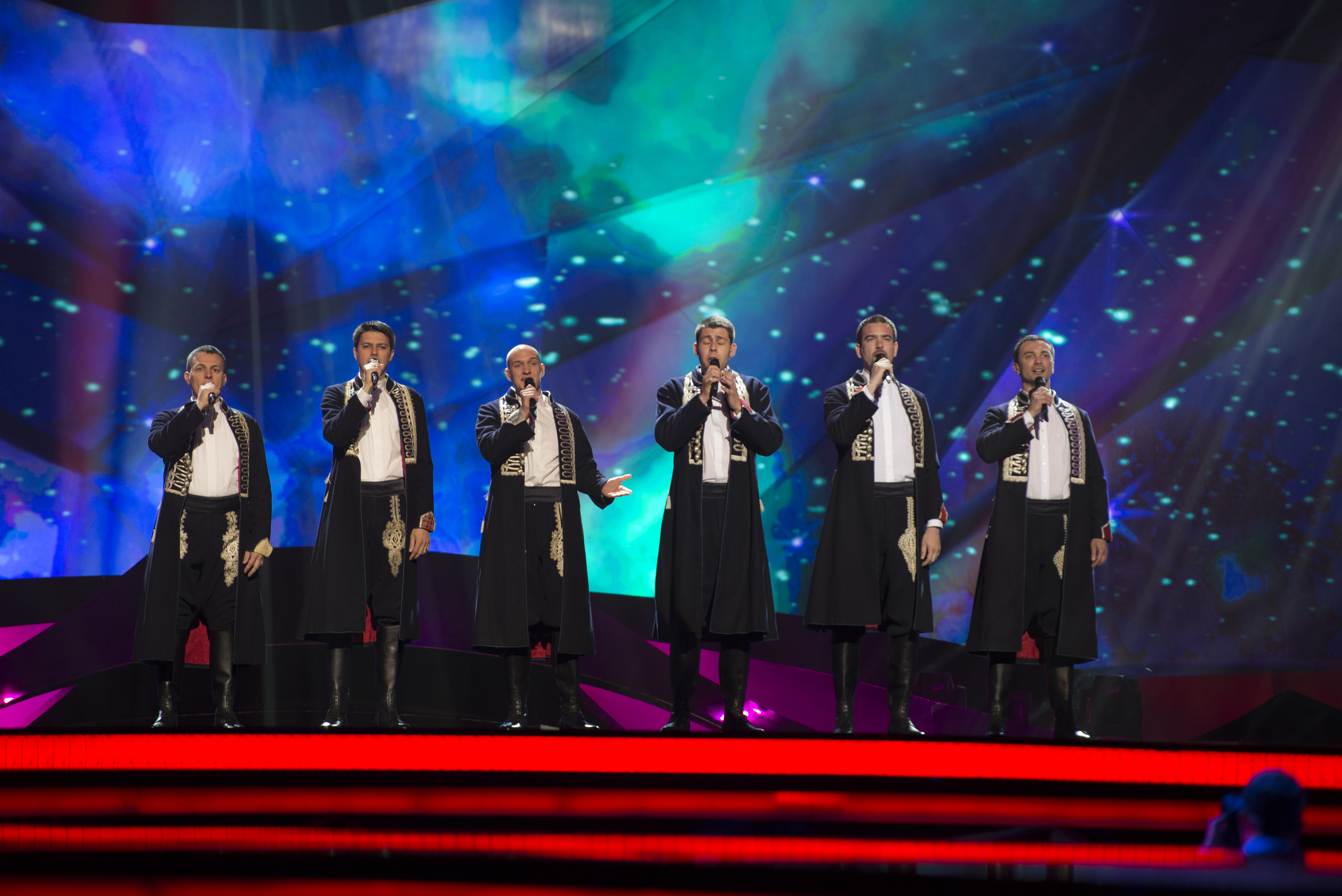
- Klapa s Mora performing their song "Mižerja" in the first dress rehearsal of the first semi final of the Eurovision Song Contest 2013

Background information
- Origin: Croatia
- Genres: Klapa
- Years active: 2013
- Members: Marko Škugor; Ante Galić; Nikša Antica; Leon Bataljaku; Ivica Vlaić; Bojan Kavedžija

Klapa s Mora was a music ensemble that represented Croatia in the Eurovision Song Contest 2013 in Malmö with the song "Mižerja". It is a "super klapa" ensemble that includes six male klapa singers from five existing klapa groups in Croatia.

== Members ==
- Marko Škugor - First tenor (from klapa Kampanel)
- Ante Galić - Second tenor (from klapa Sinj)
- Nikša Antica - First baritone (from klapa Kampanel)
- Leon Bataljaku - Second baritone (from klapa Crikvenica)
- Ivica Vlaić - Bass (from klapa Sebenico)
- Bojan Kavedžija - Bass (from klapa Grdelin)

== Eurovision 2013 ==
During their performance in the first semi-final night of the Eurovision Song Contest 2013 the members of the Klapa s mora presented themselves in traditional outfits worn by the Sinjska alka competitors. Sinjska alka, as well as the klapa style of singing is included in the UNESCO Intangible Cultural Heritage Lists.

They participated in the semi-final and didn't qualify to the grand final of the contest.

Achievements
Preceded by Nina Badrić with "Nebo"	Croatia in the Eurovision Song Contest; 2013	Succeeded by Nina Kraljić with "Lighthouse"
