= Nina Kraljić =

Croatian singer-songwriter and voice actress

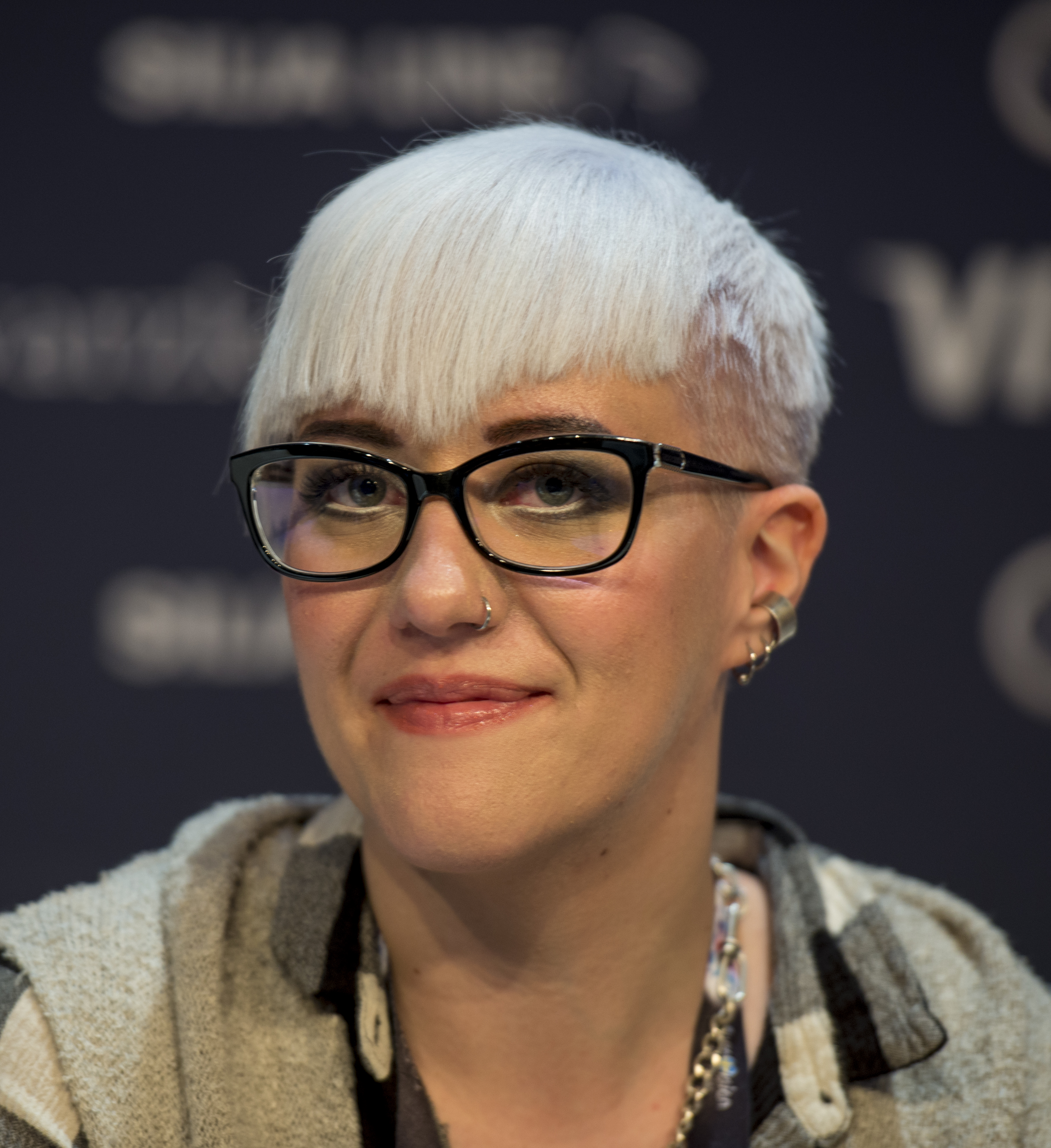
- Kraljić at a Meet & Greet during the Eurovision Song Contest 2016 in Stockholm.
- Born: Nina Kraljić; 4 April 1992 (age 34); Lipovljani, Croatia
- Occupations: Singer; songwriter; composer; voice actress
- Musical career
- Genres: Pop; world
- Instruments: Vocals; piano
- Years active: 2009–present
- Labels: Universal Music Group; Dallas Records

Nina Kraljić (Croatian pronunciation: [nîna krǎːʎitɕ]; born 4 April 1992) is a Croatian singer-songwriter and voice actress. She is known for winning season one of The Voice – Najljepši glas Hrvatske and for being a finalist in the Eurovision Song Contest 2016 with the song "Lighthouse". Kraljić is the winner of the Croatian Porin award for Croatia's best new act of 2016. Her debut album Samo was released on September 30, 2016.

== Life and career ==
=== Early life and career ===
Nina Kraljić was born in Lipovljani, Croatia on 4 April 1992 to Željko and Irena Kraljić. She has a younger sister Tena. Kraljić's first TV appearance was in 2009 when she entered Supertalent, the Croatian version of Got Talent. She placed tenth in the final stage of the competition. When Kraljić was 14, she left her family to develop her musical expression. She studied opera at a music academy and Croatian studies at the Faculty of Philosophy in Rijeka. She is openly bisexual.

=== 2015–present: Samo ===
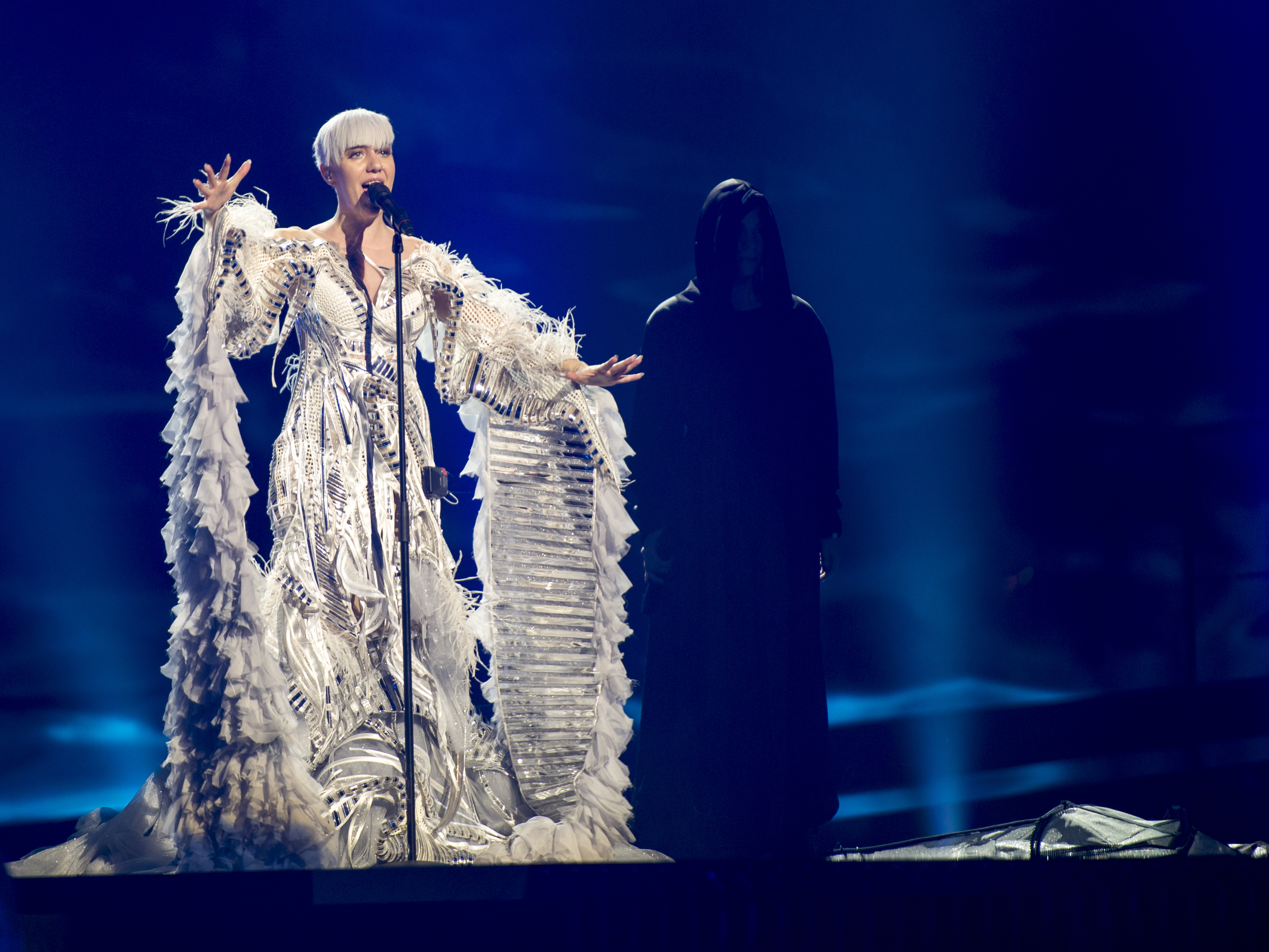
Kraljić performing "Lighthouse" in the Eurovision Song Contest 2016.

Kraljić competed in the first season of Croatian version of The Voice – Najljepši glas Hrvatske. During her participation she performed the song "Beneath Your Beautiful", "Što te nema", and the Macedonian folk song "Zajdi, zajdi, jasno sonce". Her voice was also recognized by Jacques Houdek, who mentored her to victory, with Kraljić receiving roughly 1 million votes in the final round. She later released her debut single "Zaljuljali smo svijet" (We Swung the World) in June 2015, a modern ballad with ethnic elements.

On 24 February 2016, it was announced by Hrvatska radiotelevizija that Kraljić would represent Croatia in the Eurovision Song Contest 2016 in Stockholm, Sweden. On 9 March 2016, she released her 2016 contest song "Lighthouse". On 17 March 2016, Kraljić won the prestigious Croatian music award Porin for the Best Upcoming Artist in Croatia for 2015. She led Croatia to the Eurovision Song Contest final after for the first time after seven years, coming tenth in the first semi-final with 133 points, and 23rd in the grand final with 73 points. Her debut album Samo (Only) was released on 30 September 2016. Kraljić presented herself as a songwriter with two songs "Lullaby" and "Lay You Down" in English. On 19 August 2016, she announced a collaboration with the Croatian composer Matija Dedić on the song "Što te nema" (Why Are You Not Here) also featured on the album.

In December 2020, Kraljić was announced as one of the fourteen finalists of Dora 2021. She performed the song "Rijeka" (River) which she co-wrote together with Hana Librenjak and Miki Solus and ended up in second place behind Albina with "Tick-Tock". Kraljić also had some technical difficulties during her performance in Dora 2021 and deleted some of her social media profiles.

== Filmography ==
=== Film ===
Year	Title	Role	Notes
2011	Lota i tajna mjesečevog kamena	Lota	Croatian dub
2012	Snježna kraljica	Gerda	Croatian dub
2014	Snježna kraljica 2	Gerda	Croatian dub

=== Television ===
Year	Title	Role	Notes
2009	Supertalent	Contestant	10th place
2011	Idi, Diego, idi!	Alisa Marquez	Croatian dub
2011	iCarly	Sam Puckett (Season 2 only)	Croatian dub
2011	PopPixie	Chatta (Episodes 1–20 only)	Croatian dub
2011	Victorious	Cat Valentine (Season 1 only)	Croatian dub
2012	Victorious	Fawn "Poni" Liebowitz	Croatian dub
2012	Winx Club	Icy (Season 5 only)	Croatian dub
2013	Marvin Marvin	Briana	Croatian dub
2013–14	Sanjay i Craig	Megan Šljokić	Croatian dub
2013–15	Sofija Prva	Sofija	Croatian dub
2015	Sara i patka	Sara	Croatian dub
2015	Henry Opasan	Veronika	Croatian dub
2015	The Voice – Najljepši glas Hrvatske	Contestant	Winner
2016	Bella i Buldozi	Pepper Silverstein	Croatian dub
2021	Dora 2021	Contestant	2nd place

== Discography ==
=== Studio albums ===
Title	Details	Peak chart positions
Title	Details	CRO
Samo	Released: 30 September 2016; Label: Universal Music Croatia; Format: Digital download	8
Čuvaj me	Released: 31 December 2020; Label: Dallas Records; Format: Digital download	—

=== Singles ===
Title	Year	Peak chart positions	Album
Title	Year	CRO	Album
"Kaži mi"	2009	—	Non-album single
"Zaljuljali smo svijet"	2015	—	Samo
"Lighthouse"	2016	4	Samo
"Samo"	2016	—	Samo
"Snijeg"	2016	—	Samo
"Najljepši dan"	2018	34	Čuvaj me
"Lava"	2019	—	Čuvaj me
"Mi"	2019	—	Čuvaj me
"Se do kad je sveta"	2019	—	Čuvaj me
"Čista umjetnost" (with Jacques Houdek)	2019	30	Čuvaj me
"Zima" (with Marin Jurić Čivro)	2020	10	Čuvaj me
"Snaga"	2020	—	Čuvaj me
"Čuvaj me"	2020	—	Čuvaj me
"Rijeka"	2021	—	Non-album single

Awards and achievements
Preceded by N/A	The Voice of Croatia winner 2015	Succeeded by Ruža Janjiš
Preceded by Klapa s Mora with "Mižerja"	Croatia in the Eurovision Song Contest; 2016	Succeeded by Jacques Houdek with "My friend"
