= Ukraine in the Eurovision Song Contest 2013 =

- Eurovision Song Contest 2013
- Participating broadcaster: National Television Company of Ukraine (NTU)
- Country: Ukraine
- Selection process: Yevrobachennia 2013 – Natsionalnyi vidbir
- Selection date: 23 December 2012

Competing entry
- Song: "Gravity"
- Artist: Zlata Ognevich
- Songwriters: Karen Kavaleryan; Mikhail Nekrasov

Placement
- Semi-final result: Qualified (3rd, 140 points)
- Final result: 3rd, 214 points

Participation chronology

Ukraine was represented at the Eurovision Song Contest 2013 with the song "Gravity", written by Karen Kavaleryan and Mikhail Nekrasov, and performed by Zlata Ognevich. The Ukrainian participating broadcaster, National Television Company of Ukraine (NTU), organised a national final in order to select its entry for the contest. Nineteen entries competed in the national selection held on 23 December 2012 and "Gravity" performed by Zlata Ognevich was selected as the winner following the combination of votes from a five-member jury panel and a public televote.

Ukraine was drawn to compete in the first semi-final of the Eurovision Song Contest which took place on 14 May 2013. Performing during the show in position 7, "Gravity" was announced among the top 10 entries of the first semi-final and therefore qualified to compete in the final on 18 May. It was later revealed that Ukraine placed third out of the 16 participating countries in the semi-final with 140 points. In the final, Ukraine performed in position 22 and placed third out of the 26 participating countries with 213 points.

== Background ==
Prior to the 2013 contest, the National Television Company of Ukraine (NTU) had participated in the Eurovision Song Contest representing Ukraine ten times since its first entry in 2003, winning the contest in 2004 with the song "Wild Dances" performed by Ruslana. Following the introduction of semi-finals for the 2004, Ukraine had managed to qualify to final in every contest they participated in thus far. Ukraine had been the runner-up in the contest on two occasions: in 2007 with the song "Dancing Lasha Tumbai" performed by Verka Serduchka and in 2008 with the song "Shady Lady" performed by Ani Lorak. Ukraine's least successful result had been 19th place, achieved in 2005, with the song "Razom nas bahato" performed by GreenJolly.

As part of its duties as participating broadcaster, NTU organises the selection of its entry in the Eurovision Song Contest and broadcasts the event in the country. The broadcaster confirmed its intentions to participate at the 2013 contest on 24 September 2012. In the past, the broadcaster had alternated between both internal selections and national finals in order to select its entry. Between 2011 and 2012, NTU had set up national finals with several artists to choose both the song and performer, with both the public and a panel of jury members involved in the selection. The method was continued to select the 2013 entry.

== Before Eurovision ==
=== Yevrobachennia 2013 – Natsionalnyi vidbir ===
NTU held the Ukrainian national final on 23 December 2012 at its studios in Kyiv. The show was hosted by Timur Myroshnychenko, Tatyana Goncharova and Tetiana Terekhova and broadcast on Pershyi Natsionalnyi as well as online via NTU's official website 1tv.com.ua and the official Eurovision Song Contest website eurovision.tv.

==== Format ====
The selection of the competing entries for the national final and ultimately the Ukrainian Eurovision entry took place over two stages. In the first stage, artists and songwriters had the opportunity to apply for the competition by attending a scheduled audition. Twenty acts were selected and announced on 21 December 2012. The second stage was the televised final, which took place on 23 December 2012 and featured the twenty acts vying to represent Ukraine in Malmö. The winner was selected via the 50/50 combination of votes from a public televote and an expert jury. Both the public televote and the expert jury assigned scores ranging from 1 (lowest) to 20 (highest) and the entry that had the highest number of points following the combination of these scores was declared the winner. Viewers participating in the public televote during the show had the opportunity to submit a single vote per phone number for each of the participating entries via SMS. In the event of a tie, the tie was decided in favour of the entry that received the highest score from the jury.

==== Competing entries ====
Artists and composers had the opportunity to submit their entries between 1 October 2012 and 21 December 2012. Auditions were held on 21 December 2012 at the NTU Headquarters in Kyiv where a seven-member selection panel reviewed the 52 received submissions and shortlisted twenty entries to compete in the national final.

Artist	Song	Songwriter(s)
Alina Grosu	"Let Go"	Alina Grosu
Ana Stesia	"Dare to Change Your Life"	Artem Kuzmenkov
AngeliyA	"Love Is Life"	AngeliyA
Dasha Medova	"Don't Want to Be Alone"	Oleksandr Shvets, Yevhen Matiushenko
Dima Skalozubov	"Davno" (Давно)	Dima Skalozubov
DiO.filmy	"Medlyak" (Медляк)	Yurii Melnyk, Oleh Voronovych, Volodymyr Hudkov, Vadym Oliinyk
Dmytro Yaremchuk	"Mama" (Мама)	Nazarii Yaremchuk jr.
Duet Emotion	"Saviour"	Milos Rosas
Eduard Romanyuta	"Get Real With My Heart"	Emanuel Olsson
Hvozdivchanka	"Naletily huseniata" (Налетіли гусенята)	Traditional
Inesh	"Delayu shag" (Делаю шаг)	A. Shell, Inesh Kdyrova
Olena Kornieieva	"You'll Be the Winner Forever"	Olena Kornieieva, Nina Katolina
Marietta	"Wonder"	Dmytro Sydorov, Natali Dali
Mariya Yaremchuk	"Imagine"	Mariya Yaremchuk
Matvey Vermiyenko	"Otkryvay menya" (Открывай меня)	Matvey Vermiyenko
Oksana Pekun and Maksym Novytskyi	"Zelenyi dubochok" (Зелений дубочок)	Maksym Novitskyi
Real Ivanna	"You Gave Me Everything"	Real Ivanna
Tetiana Shyrko	"Feeling Like a Sir"	Yuliia Slobodyan, Evhenii Matiushenko
Triniti	"Belym po belomu" (Белым по белому)	Astraya
Zlata Ognevich	"Gravity"	Karen Kavaleryan, Mykhailo Nekrasov

==== Final ====
The final took place on 23 December 2012. During the show, Oksana Pekun and Maxim Novitskiy announced their withdrawal following their performance. The remaining nineteen entries competed and the winner, "Gravity" performed by Zlata Ognevich, was selected through the combination of votes from a public televote and an expert jury. Ties were decided in favour of the entries that received higher scores from the jury. The jury panel consisted of Egor Benkendorf (President of NTU), Walid Arfush (producer), Olena Mozgovaya (music producer), Yuriy Rybchynsky (poet) and Olga Navrotska (stylist and designer). 14,612 votes were registered by the televote during the show. In addition to the performances of the competing entries, 2012 Junior Eurovision Song Contest winner Anastasiya Petryk, Gvozdivchanka, Matias, Oleg Vynnyk, Pavel Sokolov, Shanis and Tetyana Vorzheva performed as guests.

Final – 23 December 2012
R/O	Artist	Song	Jury	Televote		Total	Place
R/O	Artist	Song	Jury	Votes	Points	Total	Place
1	~~Oksana Pekun and Maksym Novytskyi~~	~~"Zelenyi dubochok"~~	—	~~23~~	—	—	—
2	Mariya Yaremchuk	"Imagine"	16	260	14	30	5
3	Marietta	"Wonder"	9	87	5	14	15
4	Dmytro Yaremchuk	"Mama"	11	533	17	28	7
5	Inesh	"Delayu shag"	10	133	8	18	13
6	Zlata Ognevich	"Gravity"	20	8,639	20	40	1
7	Duet Emotion	"Saviour"	15	162	10	25	10
8	Hvozdivchanka	"Naletily huseniata"	11	208	11	22	12
9	Real Ivanna	"You Gave Me Everything"	14	247	13	27	8
10	Tetiana Shyrko	"Feeling Like a Sir"	17	365	15	32	4
11	Triniti	"Belym po belomu"	8	108	6	14	15
12	Ana Stesia	"Dare to Change Your Life"	9	127	7	16	14
13	Alina Grosu	"Let Go"	13	387	16	29	6
14	Dasha Medova	"Don't Want to Be Alone"	19	905	18	37	2
15	Olena Kornieieva	"You'll Be the Winner Forever"	13	240	12	25	10
16	AngeliyA	"Love Is Life"	8	81	4	12	18
17	Eduard Romanyuta	"Get Real With My Heart"	14	1,847	19	33	3
18	Matvey Vermiyenko	"Otkryvay menya"	7	70	3	10	19
19	DiO.filmy	"Medlyak"	18	141	9	27	8
20	Dima Skalozubov	"Davno"	12	49	2	14	15

Detailed Jury Votes
R/O	Song	E. Benkendorf	W. Arfush	Y. Rybchynskyi	O. Mozgova	O. Navrotska	Total	Points
1	~~"Zelenyi dubochok"~~	—	—	—	—	—	—	—
2	"Imagine"	10	7	9	8	6	40	16
3	"Wonder"	7	6	7	6	2	26	9
4	"Mama"	10	6	5	6	2	29	11
5	"Delayu shag"	10	4	5	6	2	27	10
6	"Gravity"	10	10	10	10	10	50	20
7	"Saviour"	10	7	8	7	7	39	15
8	"Naletily huseniata"	7	7	5	5	5	29	11
9	"You Gave Me Everything"	9	7	7	7	6	36	14
10	"Feeling Like a Sir"	10	6	10	10	7	43	17
11	"Belym po belomu"	7	7	7	2	2	25	8
12	"Dare to Change Your Life"	7	5	7	4	3	26	9
13	"Let Go"	8	7	7	8	5	35	13
14	"Don't Want to Be Alone"	10	9	10	9	9	47	19
15	"You'll Be the Winner Forever"	6	7	8	7	7	35	13
16	"Love Is Life"	6	1	7	6	5	25	8
17	"Get Real With My Heart"	10	7	7	7	5	36	14
18	"Otkryvay menya"	6	2	6	1	2	17	7
19	"Medlyak"	10	9	9	8	8	44	18
20	"Davno"	6	6	7	8	4	31	12

=== Preparation ===
Following Zlata Ognevich's victory at the Ukrainian national final, it was revealed that "Gravity" would undergo a revamp for the Eurovision Song Contest. On 27 January 2013, the composer of the song Mikhail Nekrasov opened a survey on the social network VK in order to gauge public opinion about possible changes including adding another refrain, increasing the tempo of the song (originally at 85BPM), possibly changing the backing vocalists and making modifications to the beginning and end of the song. On 6 February, the survey had come to a close with the following decisions being taken under consideration by the producers:

- 35% believe the ending is strong as it is with 25% advising that it should be performed higher and louder.
- 40% believe 85BPM is optimal with 24% advising an increase to 87-88BPM.
- 41% believe the lyrics that the backing vocalists sing "You'll never, you'll never break free from gravity" are adequate with 40% advising that Ognevich should also sing these lines.
- 60% believe a third refrain is required with 45% advising that the third refrain should need more development.
- 69% of voters believe the beginning has to be more powerful.
- 86% believe the current backing vocalists should not be changed with 46% believing their vocals should be more simplified so they do not overshadow Ognevich.

Nekrasov revealed that the song's main focus would remain on the instrumental, but that certain modifications have already started to take form such as changes in the backing vocals and the addition of new sounds to the instrumental. On 11 March, the revamped version of "Gravity" was presented to the public together with the official music video on YouTube. In an interview with Novyi Kanal, Ognevich revealed that they have received over 300 ideas for the music video of the song from a competition they opened invited fans to submit their concepts and that Angela Lisitsa would be responsible for designing the outfit for her Eurovision performance.

=== Promotion ===
Zlata Ognevich made several appearances across Europe to specifically promote "Gravity" as the Ukrainian Eurovision entry. On 4 April, Ognevich was a guest of the AITF 2013 event which was held in Baku, Azerbaijan. On 13 April, Ognevich performed during the Eurovision in Concert event which was held at the Melkweg venue in Amsterdam, Netherlands and hosted by Marlayne and Linda Wagenmakers.

== At Eurovision ==
According to Eurovision rules, all nations with the exceptions of the host country and the "Big Five" (France, Germany, Italy, Spain and the United Kingdom) are required to qualify from one of two semi-finals in order to compete for the final; the top ten countries from each semi-final progress to the final. The European Broadcasting Union (EBU) split up the competing countries into six different pots based on voting patterns from previous contests, with countries with favourable voting histories put into the same pot. On 17 January 2013, a special allocation draw was held which placed each country into one of the two semi-finals, as well as which half of the show they would perform in. Ukraine was placed into the first semi-final, to be held on 14 May 2013, and was scheduled to perform in the first half of the show.

Once all the competing songs for the 2013 contest had been released, the running order for the semi-finals was decided by the shows' producers rather than through another draw, so that similar songs were not placed next to each other. Ukraine was set to perform in position 7, following the entry from Russia and before the entry from the Netherlands.

In Ukraine, both the semi-finals and the final were broadcast on Pershyi Natsionalnyi with commentary by Timur Miroshnychenko and Tetiana Terekhova. The three shows were also broadcast via radio on UR-1 with commentary by Olena Zelinchenko. The Ukrainian spokesperson, who announced the Ukrainian votes during the final, was Oleksiy Matias.

=== Semi-final ===
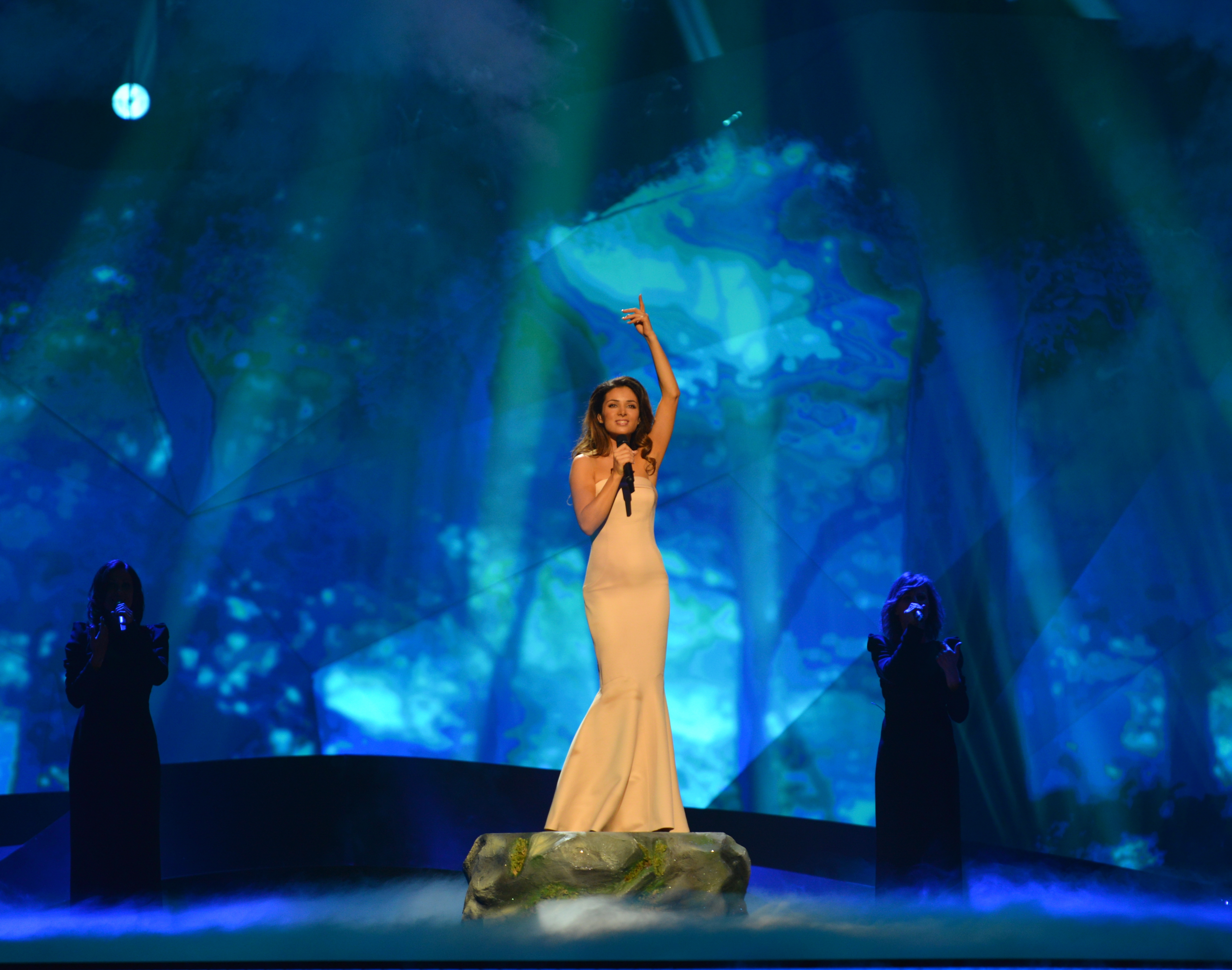
Zlata Ognevich during a rehearsal before the first semi-final

Zlata Ognevich took part in technical rehearsals on 3 and 6 May, followed by dress rehearsals on 9 and 10 May. This included the jury show on 9 May where the professional juries of each country watched and voted on the competing entries.

The Ukrainian performance featured Zlata Ognevich performing on stage in a long beige dress designed by Olena Reva together with four backing vocalists. The singer was also accompanied on stage by Igor Vovkovinskiy, the tallest living person in the United States, who played the role of a fantasy giant in a brown coat and hat. The performance began with Vovkovinskiy carrying Ognevich to a stone podium from where she performed the rest of the song, with a blue fairytale forest scenery with butterflies and sunrises appearing on the LED screens throughout. The stage director and choreographer for the Ukrainian performance was Maksym Lytvynov. The four backing vocalists that joined Zlata Ognevich on stage were Ann Bailey, Holly Petrie, Cleveland Watkiss and Dasha Mineeva.

At the end of the show, Ukraine was announced as having finished in the top 10 and subsequently qualifying for the grand final. It was later revealed that Ukraine placed third in the semi-final, receiving a total of 140 points: 152 points from the televoting and 135 points from the juries.

=== Final ===
Shortly after the first semi-final, a winners' press conference was held for the ten qualifying countries. As part of this press conference, the qualifying artists took part in a draw to determine which half of the grand final they would subsequently participate in. This draw was done in the order the countries appeared in the semi-final running order. Ukraine was drawn to compete in the second half. Following this draw, the shows' producers decided upon the running order of the final, as they had done for the semi-finals. Ukraine was subsequently placed to perform in position 22, following the entry from Greece and before the entry from Italy.

Zlata Ognevich once again took part in dress rehearsals on 17 and 18 May before the final, including the jury final where the professional juries cast their final votes before the live show. Zlata Ognevich performed a repeat of her semi-final performance during the final on 18 May. At the conclusion of the voting, Ukraine finished in third place with 214 points.

=== Voting ===
Voting during the three shows consisted of 50 percent public televoting and 50 percent from a jury deliberation. The jury consisted of five music industry professionals who were citizens of the country they represent. This jury was asked to judge each contestant based on: vocal capacity; the stage performance; the song's composition and originality; and the overall impression by the act. In addition, no member of a national jury could be related in any way to any of the competing acts in such a way that they cannot vote impartially and independently.

Following the release of the full split voting by the EBU after the conclusion of the competition, it was revealed that Ukraine had placed third with the public televote and fourth with the jury vote in the semi-final. In the public vote, Ukraine received an average rank of 3.94, while with the jury vote, Ukraine received an average rank of 5.16. In the final, Ukraine had placed second with the public televote and sixth with the jury vote. In the public vote, Ukraine received an average rank of 5.66, while with the jury vote, Ukraine received an average rank of 8.74.

Below is a breakdown of points awarded to Ukraine and awarded by Ukraine in the first semi-final and grand final of the contest. The nation awarded its 12 points to Belarus in the semi-final and the final of the contest.

==== Points awarded to Ukraine ====
Points awarded to Ukraine (Semi-final 1)
Score	Country
12 points	Belarus; Cyprus; Italy; Lithuania; Moldova; Montenegro; Slovenia
10 points	
8 points	Belgium; Denmark; Netherlands
7 points	Croatia; Russia
6 points	Estonia
5 points	Serbia
4 points	
3 points	
2 points	Austria; Ireland; United Kingdom
1 point	Sweden

Points awarded to Ukraine (Final)
Score	Country
12 points	Armenia; Azerbaijan; Belarus; Croatia; Moldova
10 points	Bulgaria; Cyprus; Estonia; Israel; Lithuania; Malta; Serbia; Spain
8 points	Belgium; Georgia; Greece; Ireland
7 points	Hungary; Latvia
6 points	
5 points	Italy; Netherlands; United Kingdom
4 points	Romania
3 points	Denmark; Iceland
2 points	
1 point	Austria; Norway; Russia

==== Points awarded by Ukraine ====
Points awarded by Ukraine (Semi-final 1)
Score	Country
12 points	Belarus
10 points	Moldova
8 points	Montenegro
7 points	Russia
6 points	Croatia
5 points	Lithuania
4 points	Denmark
3 points	Ireland
2 points	Serbia
1 point	Estonia

Points awarded by Ukraine (Final)
Score	Country
12 points	Belarus
10 points	Azerbaijan
8 points	Moldova
7 points	Georgia
6 points	Armenia
5 points	Denmark
4 points	Russia
3 points	Norway
2 points	Malta
1 point	Lithuania
