= Lighthouse (Nina Kraljić song) =

2016 single by Nina Kraljić

Single by Nina Kraljić

from the album Samo
- Released: 9 March 2016
- Recorded: 2016
- Genre: World music; Pop
- Length: 3:00
- Label: Universal Music Group
- Songwriters: Andreas Grass; Nikola Paryla
- Producer: Thorsten Brötzmann

Nina Kraljić singles chronology
"Zaljuljali smo svijet" (2015)	"Lighthouse" (2016)	"Samo" (2016)

Music video
- "Lighthouse" on YouTube

Eurovision Song Contest 2016 entry
- Country: Croatia
- Artist: Nina Kraljić
- Language: English
- Composers: Andreas Grass; Nikola Paryla
- Lyricists: Andreas Grass; Nikola Paryla

Finals performance
- Semi-final result: 10th
- Semi-final points: 133
- Final result: 23rd
- Final points: 73

Entry chronology
- ◄ "Mižerja" (2013)
- "My Friend" (2017) ►

"Lighthouse" is a song by Croatian singer Nina Kraljić released on March 9, 2016. It represented Croatia in the Eurovision Song Contest 2016.

== Eurovision Song Contest ==
On 24 February 2016, the Croatian national broadcaster HRT announced that it had internally selected Nina Kraljić to represent Croatia at the Eurovision Song Contest 2016. "Lighthouse" was presented on 9 March 2016 during a special radio programme broadcast on HR 2 and hosted by Zlatko Turkalj Turki. The guests of the presentation show were Nina Kraljić, the Croatian Eurovision Song Contest Head of Delegation Željko Mesar and Universal Music Croatia marketing manager Nina Meden. Kraljić made several appearances across Europe to specifically promote "Lighthouse" as the Croatian Eurovision entry. At the end of March 2016, Nina Kraljić completed a 48-hour tour of Serbia where she gave several interviews about her Eurovision participation to media outlets from Radio Television of Serbia (RTS), RTV Pink, N1 Studios and MTV Adria; Kraljić also performed "Lighthouse" live for the first time during the RTS morning programme. On 9 April, Kraljić performed during the Eurovision in Concert event which was held at the Melkweg venue in Amsterdam, Netherlands and hosted by Cornald Maas and Hera Björk.

== Commercial performance ==
"Lighthouse" debuted at number 18 on the Croatian HR Top 40 singles chart, marking her first entrance on the chart since her lead single "Zaljuljali smo svijet" failed to enter the HR Top 40 chart. On the Croatian airplay chart "Lighthouse" was the third highest debuting single for the week-ending March 17, 2016. By May 2016, it had reached number 4 on the HR Top 40 chart, becoming Kraljić's first Top 5 hit in her career.

== Music video ==
On March 9, 2016, the official audio video for the song was released. The preview video was released on March 21, 2016. In the preview video materials from the short film "Hvar - Into the Storm" which were filmed by Mario Romulić and Dražen Stojčić while on a two-year stay on the island of Hvar were used. The video shows mostly thunderstorms, clouds and the island's fauna in slow motion and time lapse techniques. While the filming took exclusively place on the island of Hvar itself, there are also scenes from the mountain of Biokovo and the nearby island Brač.

The official music video was released on 11 April 2016. Official music video thematically avoids nautical visuals that have been established in the preview video and instead tells a sci-fi fantasy story in which earthy Nina is communicating with her doppelgänger in the skies above. Nina Kraljic explained that the video follows the story of a concerned Nina on the Earth, who seeks her link with the spiritual Nina, who is completely unloaded of earthly difficulties and troubles and hovers in space, giving hope. Nina commented about how much she loved the script and the idea that the video was made like a short film. Most of all she liked that it has a theme of hope and is deeply symbolic and shows no expected motif of water and the lighthouse.

== Track listing ==
Digital download
No.	Title	Length
1.	"Lighthouse"	3:00

== Chart performance ==
=== Weekly charts ===
Chart (2016)	Peak position
Croatia (HR Top 40)	4

== Release history ==
Region	Date	Format	Label	Ref.
Croatia	9 March 2016	Radio premiere	Universal Music Croatia	
Worldwide	11 March 2016	Digital download	Universal Music Croatia	
