= Živo blato =

Croatian heavy metal band

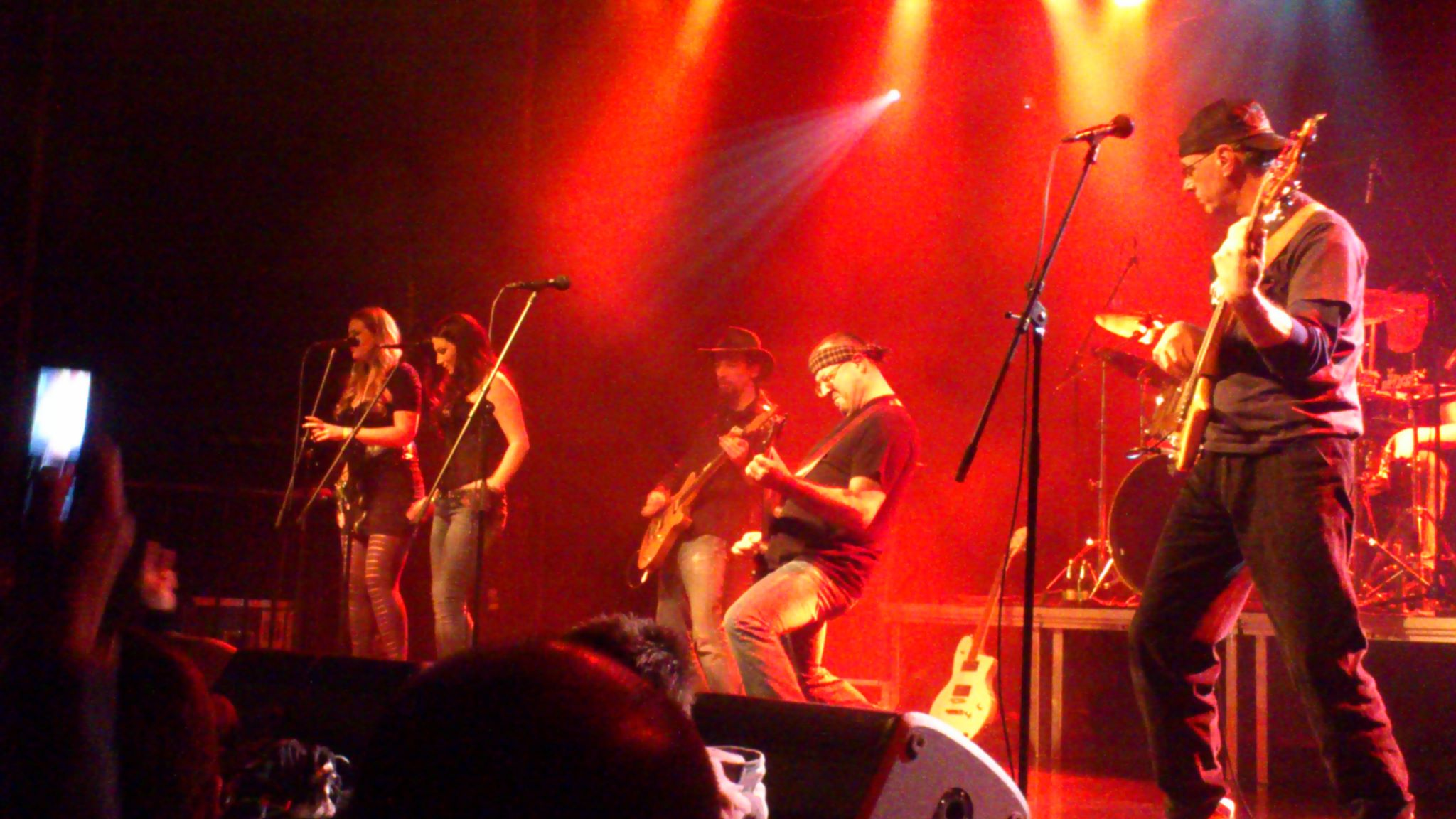
- Živo Blato on stage in Zagreb 2013

Background information
- Origin: Split, Croatia
- Genres: Heavy metal Hard rock
- Years active: 1997–present
- Members: General Vasilij Mitu (Siniša Vuco); Veseli Sir (Mirjan Jovanović Tošo); Mr. Rabbit (Nenad Miškec Zec); Nazifa Gljiva (Antonija Knezović); Trudna Tableta (Jelena Čorušić); Žlic (Ivan Špeljak Jitz)

Živo blato (eng. quicksand) is a Croatian heavy metal band. It was founded in Split in 1997 by folk/rock singer Siniša Vuco.

== Members ==
It is a trio consisting of Siniša Vuco who takes the stage name General Vasilij Mitu on guitar and vocals, Veseli Sir (merry cheese) on drums, and Mala Planina (little mountain) on bass. Vuco described his own stage name by saying: "It was trendy in Croatia for a non-Croats to take a Croatian name so I have deicided to take a Russian name and a Romanian surname"..." The title general is used in order to show Živo Blato rehearsal's military drill." He explained unusual pseudonyms: "If a member leaves the band I can replace him by another musician and keep the name" even though this does not explain their oddness.

In 2011 two female backing vocalists joined the band, under the stage names Nazifa Gljiva and Trudna Tableta (pregnant pill). Bass player Mala Planina was replaced by a former bass player Gospodin Mr. Rabbit, an old band member. This lineup made a music video for the song "Otet Ću Te Njemu" (I will take you away from him) with the lesbian theme. Two female singers on lead vocals make the video even more provocative, but it did not brought much attention. On this occasion Nazifa Gljiva said:

"We recorded a song few months ago in the studio Tetrapak in Split, in the end of March we will be entering a studio in Zagreb where we will continue to record the album with more than a hundred songs. They will be released on six or seven CDs, through Croatia Records. It will contain over nine hours of music".

== History ==
They played their first concert in November 2000 in Split. In Croatia and neighbouring countries the band has a cult following, although they have released only one album, and played just a few concerts. Since 2010 Vuco has been announcing a new album, that thus far, has remained unreleased. On the concerts they perform brand new songs, that are expected to be released on the upcoming album. Vuco once again announced the album entitled "Kad Program Završi" (When the Schedule is Through) for the beginning of 2012.

In September 2012 Živo blato released a live album entitled "Live in Zagreb 2012".

== Discography ==
Studio albums

- Konac konca (2000)

Live albums

- Live in Zagreb 2012 (2012)
