= Igor Vovkovinskiy =

Ukrainian-American known for being America's tallest person

- Ігор Вовковинський
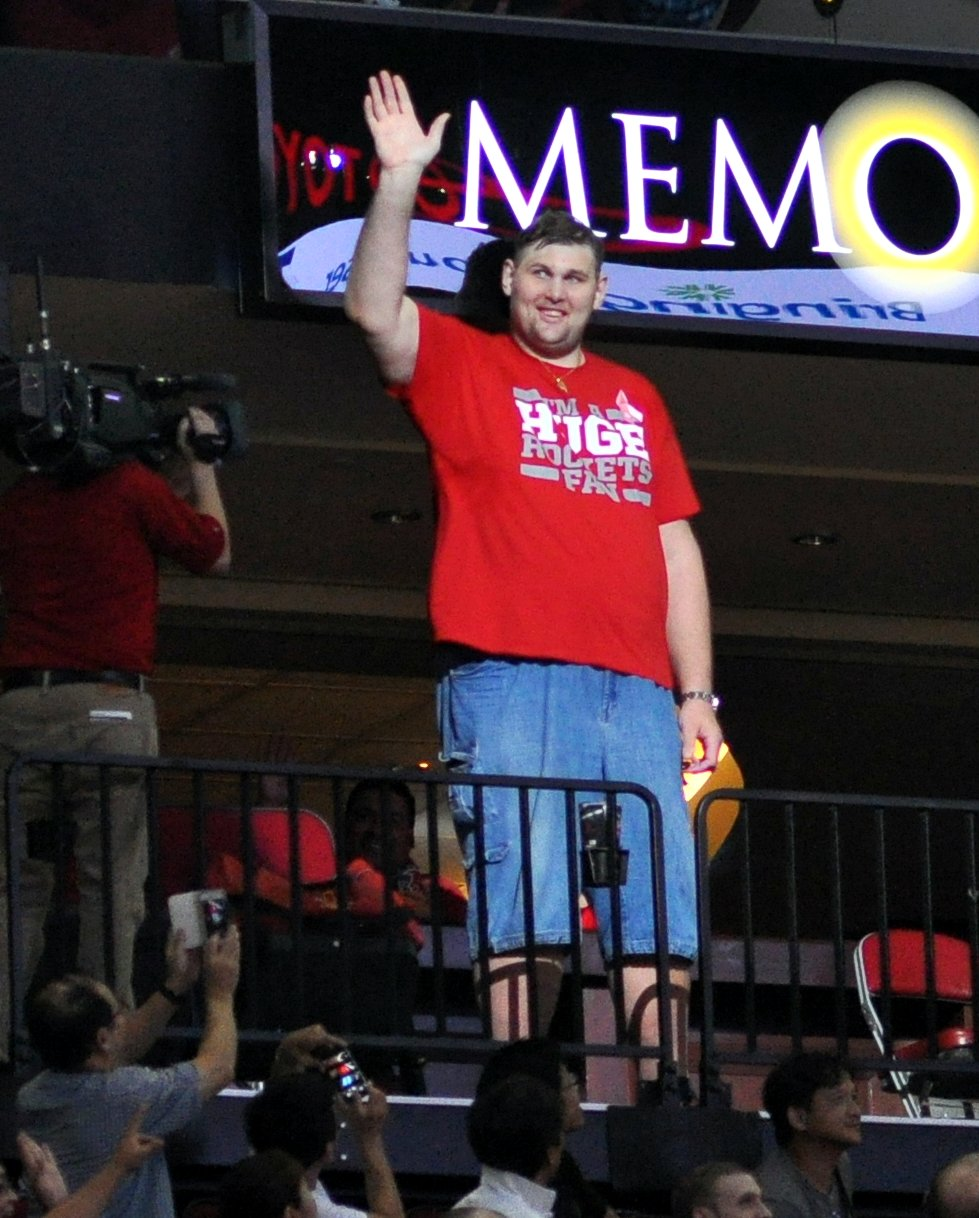
- Vovkovinskiy waves to the crowd at a basketball game in Houston in 2013.
- Born: September 18, 1982; Bar, Ukrainian SSR, Soviet Union (now Ukraine)
- Died: August 20, 2021 (aged 38); Rochester, Minnesota, United States
- Known for: Tallest living person in the United States
- Height: 7 ft 8.33 in (234.52 cm)

Igor Vovkovinskiy (Note: Ukrainian: Ігор Вовковинський, romanized: Ihor Vovkovynskyi) (also known as Igor Ladan; September 18, 1982 – August 20, 2021) was a Ukrainian-American law student, actor and tallest living person in the United States, at 7 feet 8 1/3 inches (234.5 cm), briefly taking the record from George Bell.

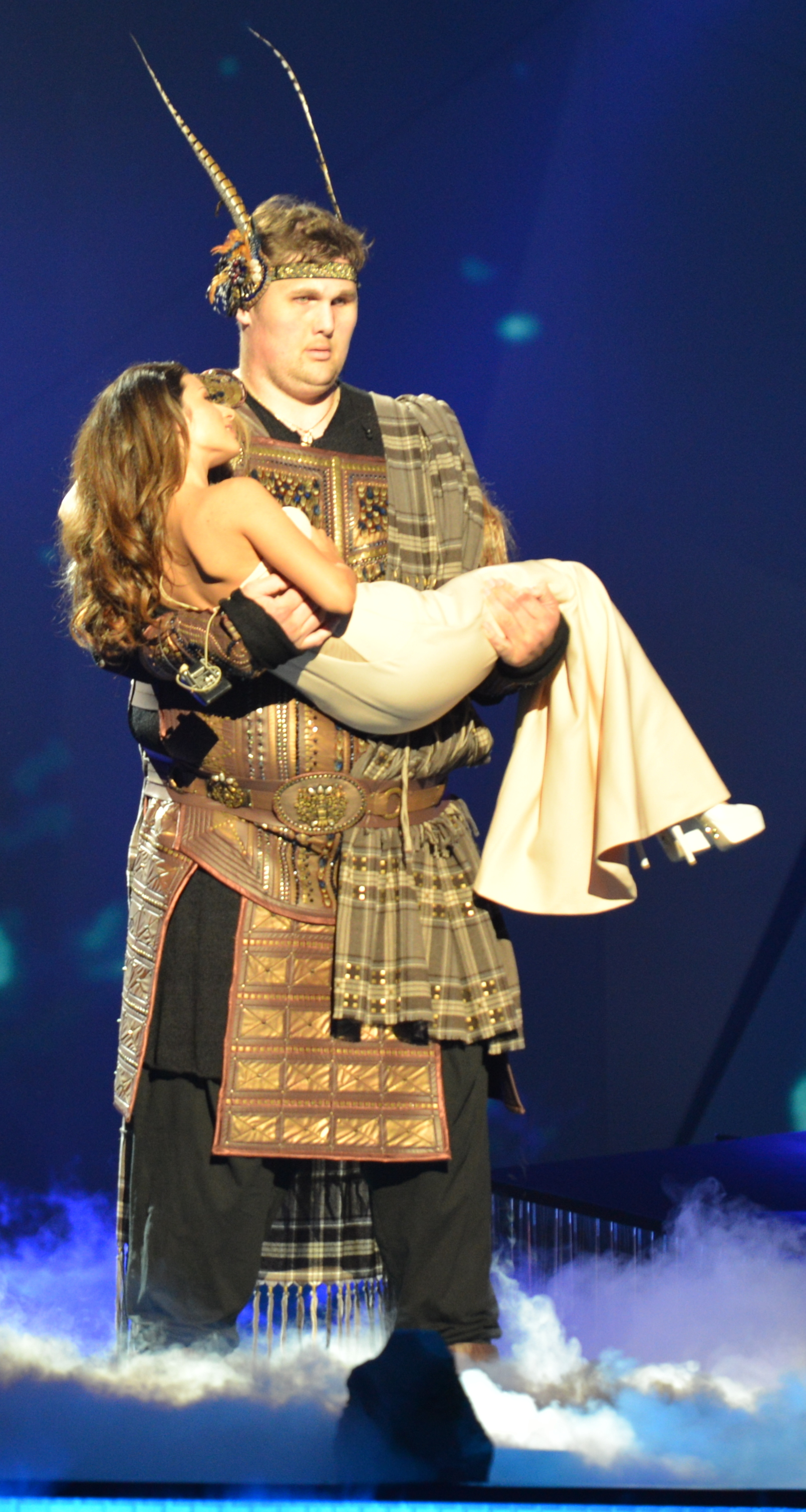
Vovkovinskiy performing during the Eurovision Song Contest 2013

Originally from Ukraine, Vovkovinskiy moved to Rochester, Minnesota in 1989 to be treated at the Mayo Clinic. At that time, he was already at least 6 feet (182.9 cm) tall.

Vovkovinskiy acted in commercials and films, including the 2011 comedy Hall Pass, and became better known for wearing a T-shirt that read "World's Biggest Obama Supporter" to a Barack Obama rally. He was the first official tallest living person from two countries. He joined singer Zlata Ognevich in representing Ukraine in the Eurovision Song Contest 2013.

Vovkovinskiy's height was attributed to a tumor pressing on his pituitary gland, causing it to release an excessive amount of growth hormone. In 2019, he said on his YouTube channel that he was undergoing treatment for a heart condition.

Vovkovinskiy was hospitalized for heart disease and died on August 20, 2021, at age 38.

== See also ==
- List of tallest people (men)
