= Klapa =

Form of traditional a cappella singing in Dalmatia, Croatia

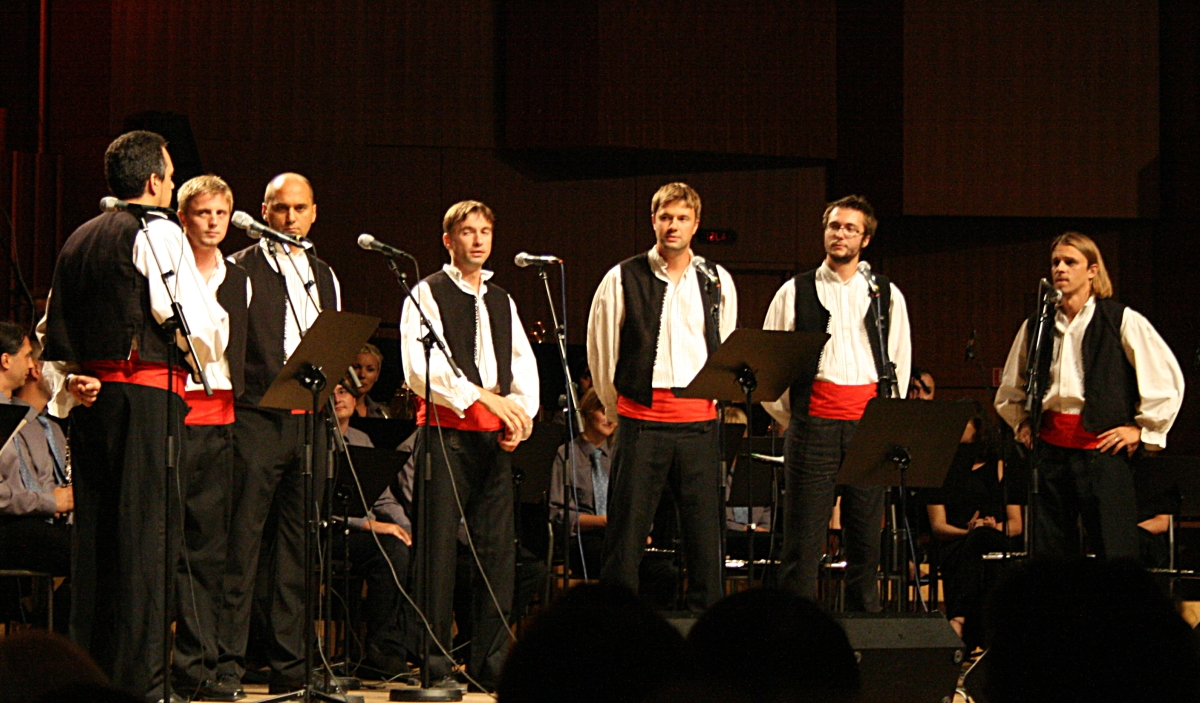
- Male klapa "Sagena" in the Vatroslav Lisinski Concert Hall
- Stylistic origins: Croatian music
- Cultural origins: Dalmatia
- Typical instruments: Human voice

Klapa multipart singing of Dalmatia, southern Croatia
- UNESCO Intangible Cultural Heritage
- Country: Croatia
- Reference: 00746
- Region: Europe and North America

Inscription history
- Inscription: 2012 (7th session)
- List: Representative

Klapa music is a form of traditional a cappella singing with origins in Dalmatia, Croatia. The word klapa translates as "a group of friends" and traces its roots to littoral church singing. The motifs in general celebrate love, wine (grapes), country (homeland) and sea. Main elements of the music are harmony and melody, with rhythm very rarely being very important. In 2008, Croatian Ministry of Culture proclaimed it Croatian Intangible Cultural Heritage. In 2012 klapa was inscribed in UNESCO Intangible Cultural Heritage of Humanity.

== Description ==
A klapa group consists of a first tenor, a second tenor, a baritone, and a bass. It is possible to double all the voices apart from the first tenor. It is usually composed of up to a dozen male singers. In recent times, female vocal groups have been quite popular, but in general male and female groups do not mix.

Although klapa is a cappella music, on occasion it is possible to add a gentle guitar and a mandolin (instrument similar in appearance and sound to tamburitzas). Klapa can also be accompanied with synthesizer keyboards, usually simulating percussion instruments.

== Modern day ==
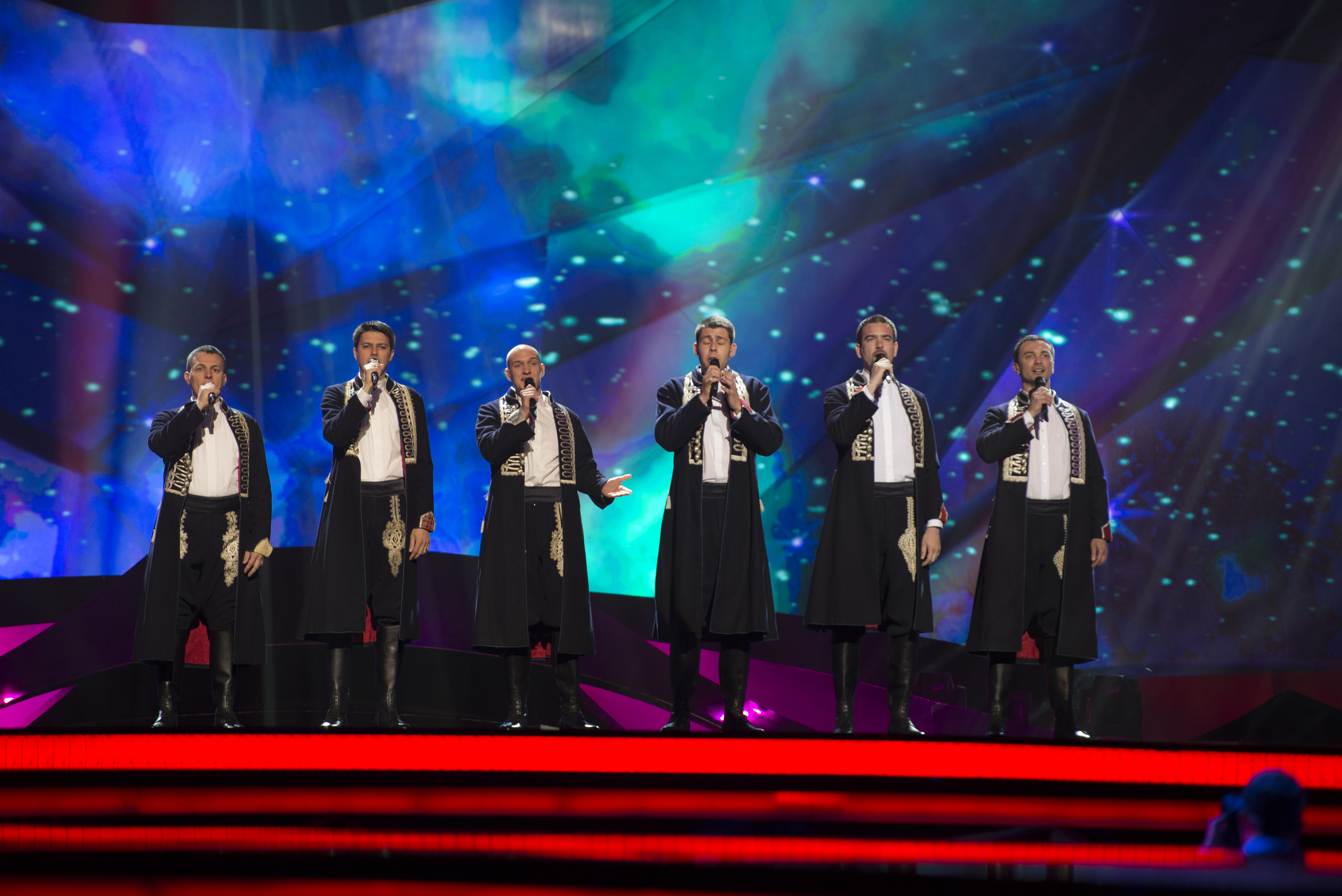
Klapa s Mora performing their song "Mižerja" in the Eurovision Song Contest 2013 in Malmö

The klapa tradition is still very much alive, with new songs composed and festivals held. The Festival of the Dalmatian Klapas in Omiš is the best known music festival and has a long tradition in Klapa music. Many young people from Dalmatia treasure klapa and sing it regularly when going out eating or drinking. It is not unusual to hear amateur klapa singing on the streets in the evenings over some food and wine.

In 2013, Croatia chose a klapa group to represent the country at the Eurovision Song Contest 2013. The klapa group was called Klapa s Mora, with the entry "Mižerja". Klapa s Mora is a "super klapa ensemble" of six performers chosen by Maestro Mojmir Čačija from five existing klapa groups, namely two from Kampanel, and one each from Sinj, Crikvenica, Šibenik and Grdelin.

There are klapa ensembles in Croatian diaspora as well. Since 2011, Croatian Culture Association in Burgenland organizes Festival klapa ("Klapa festival").

== See also ==
- A cappella
