= Samo (Nina Kraljić album) =

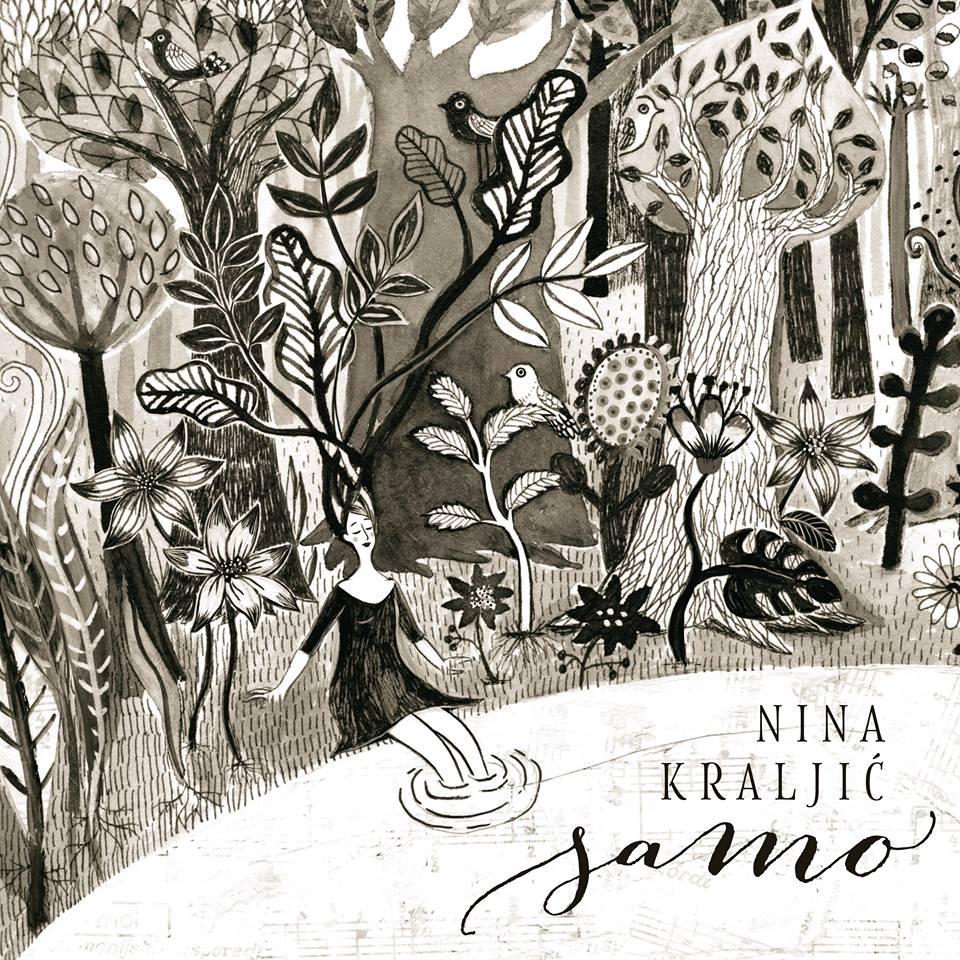

Studio album by Nina Kraljić
- Released: September 30, 2016
- Recorded: 2015–16
- Genre: World music; Pop
- Length: 50:17
- Label: Universal Music Croatia
- Producer: Tihomir Preradović, Ivan Popeskić, Thorsten Brötzmann

Nina Kraljić chronology
Samo (2016)	Čuvaj me (2020)

Singles from Samo
- 1. "Zaljuljali smo svijet" Released: 30 June 2015; 2. "Lighthouse" Released: 9 March 2016; 3. "Samo" Released: 30 September 2016; 4. "Snijeg" Released: To be released

Alternative cover
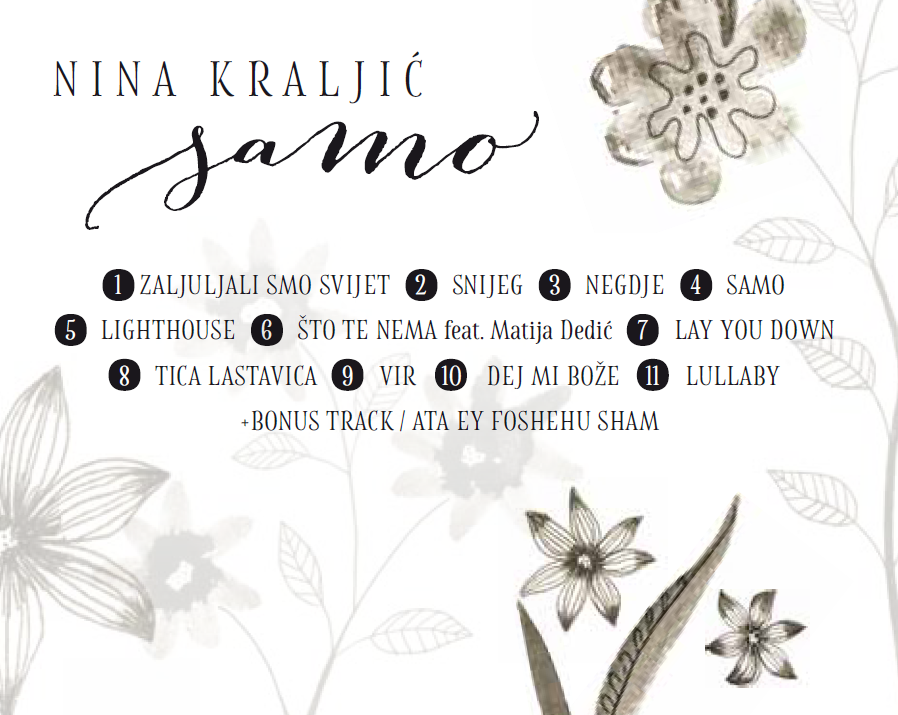
- Samo track listing

Samo (English: Only) is the debut studio album by the Croatian singer-songwriter Nina Kraljić. It was released on 30 September 2016 in Croatia, through Universal Music Austria. The album includes the singles "Zaljuljali smo svijet" and her Eurovision Song Contest 2016 entry, "Lighthouse".

== Background ==
Work on Samo began in 2015. It features Nina's successful, characteristic musical expression. The album's release was intended to be much earlier, but the Eurovision Song Contest project prolonged the process. With this album, Nina presented herself as a songwriter and composer with the songs "Lay you down" and "Lullaby". Nina wrote ''Lullaby'' when she was 18 years old, dedicating the song to her late grand grandmother. The song ''Što te nema'' features the Croatian pianist Matija Dedić. Ata ey foshehu sham is written in Hebrew, Negdje is the Croatian version of the same song.

== Singles ==
"Zaljuljali smo svijet" was released as the album's lead single and as Nina's debut single on 30 June 2015. "Lighthouse" was released as the album's second single released on 9 March 2016. It represented Croatia in the Eurovision Song Contest 2016. Samo was released on 30 September 2016 as a promotional single for the album.

== Track listing ==
Standard edition
No.	Title	Writer(s)	Producer(s)	Length
1.	"Zaljuljali smo svijet"	Ines Prajo; Arijana Kunštek	Tihomir Preradović	3:22
2.	"Snijeg"	Prajo; Kunštek	Prajo; Ivan Popeskić	4:33
3.	"Negdje"	Prajo; Kunštek	Popeskić	3:35
4.	"Samo"	Ines Prajo	Preradović	3:41
5.	"Lighthouse"	Andreas Grass; Nikola Paryla	Thorsten Brötzmann	3:00
6.	"Što te nema" (featuring Matija Dedić)	Aleksa Šantić	Preradović	8:32
7.	"Lay you down"	Nina Kraljić	Nina Kraljić; Popeskić; Tania Saedi	4:07
8.	"Tica lastavica"	Traditional	Popeskić	4:04
9.	"Vir"	Prajo; Kunštek	Preradović	4:31
10.	"Dej mi Bože"	Traditional	Preradović	3:58
11.	"Lullaby"	Kraljić	Kraljić; Tania Saedi; Popeskić	3.36
12.	"Ata Ey Foshehu Sham"	Prajo; Kunštek	Popeskić; Eden Barzilay	3:39

== Charts ==
Chart (2016)	Peak position
Croatian Domestic Albums (HDU)	8

== Release history ==
Region	Date	Format	Edition	Label	Ref.
Worldwide	30 September 2016	Digital download, CD	Standard	Universal Music Croatia	
