= Festival dalmatinskih klapa Omiš =

Croatian music festival

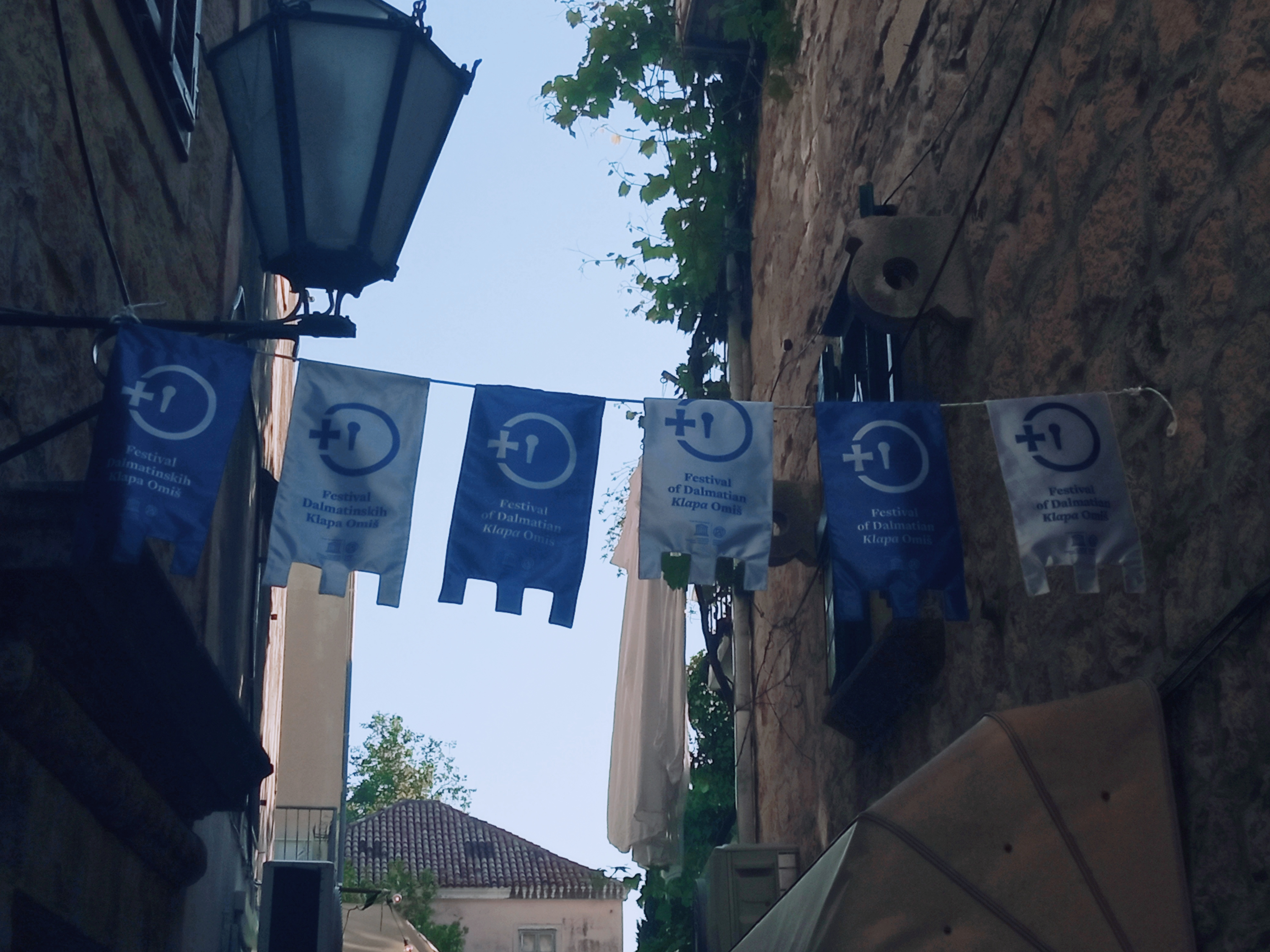
Festival's flags at the streets of Omiš.

Festival dalmatinskih klapa Omiš (Croatian for Omiš Festival of Dalmatian Klapa) is a music festival of klapa singing held annually in Omiš, Croatia. It has existed since 1966, and it is the most important klapa event.
