= Čuvaj me =

Studio album by Nina Kraljić
- Released: December 31, 2020
- Recorded: 2018–2020
- Genre: Pop
- Length: 38:40
- Label: Dallas Records

Nina Kraljić chronology
Samo (2016)	Čuvaj me (2020)

Čuvaj me (transl. Protect me) — second studio album of Croatian singer-songwriter Nina Kraljić released in 2020.

== Music album ==
Nina Kraljić's debut album "Samo" continued the success of "Čuvaj me" released on the last day of 2020. The single "Najljepši dan" included in the album was released in 2018. Nina Kraljić performed the 2020 song "Zima" together with Marin Jurić Čivro. The song "Čuvaj me", which gave its name to the second studio album, also brought great success to the singer. Released on September 8, 2020, lyrics and composition by Boris Kolarić and Maya Kolarić.

== Track listing ==
No.	Title	Length
1.	"Najljepši dan"	4:41
2.	"Čuvaj me"	2:53
3.	"Čista umjetnost"	4:00
4.	"Zima"	3:03
5.	"Snaga"	4:32
6.	"Lava"	4:22
7.	"Mala ljubav"	3:57
8.	"Slijepa ulica"	3:28
9.	"Mi"	3:49
10.	"Se do kad je sveta"	3:53

== Release history ==
Region	Date	Format	Edition	Lebel
Worldwide	December 31, 2020	Digital download, (CD)	Standart	Dallas Records

== Charts ==
Chart performance of some songs included in the music album "Cuvaj me" in Croatia charts is shown in the following table:

Song	Peak chart position
"Najljepši dan"	34
"Čista umjetnost"	30
"Zima"	10
