= Croatian Composers' Society =

Croatian copyright collection and performing rights society

Croatian Composers' Society (Croatian: Hrvatsko društvo skladatelja, HDS) is a professional organization of composers in Croatia.

The society has more than 300 full and over 9000 associate members. The full membership is available to composers, musicologists and music writers, whose applications are processed by a panel of members who evaluate the professional, artistic, or scientific merit of the applicant's work. The associate membership is available to music copyright holders - both individuals and legal persons - and entitles them to a share in the distribution of the government-collected blank media tax.

HDS organizes the Music Biennale Zagreb, an international festival of contemporary music, Zagrebfest, a festival of Croatian popular music, Jazz.hr festival, Chansonfest, Glazbena tribina Opatija and various others music events throughout the year.

HDS is a member of the Confédération Internationale des Sociétés d´Auteurs et Compositeurs (CISAC), Bureau International de l'Edition Mecanique (BIEM), International Society for Contemporary Music (ISCM), European Composers and Songwriters Alliance (ECSA) and the European Composers Forum (ECF).

The society publishes recorded music, scores and music related books through Cantus Ltd.
