= Vučo =

Vučo (pronounced [vuːt͡ʃo]; Serbian: Вучо) is a Serbian surname. Notable people with the surname include:

- Biljana Kovačević-Vučo (1952–2010), Serbian activist
- Olivera Vučo (born 1940), Serbian actress, singer, and writer
