= AngeliyA =

Ukrainian singer, songwriter, and television presenter (born 1987)

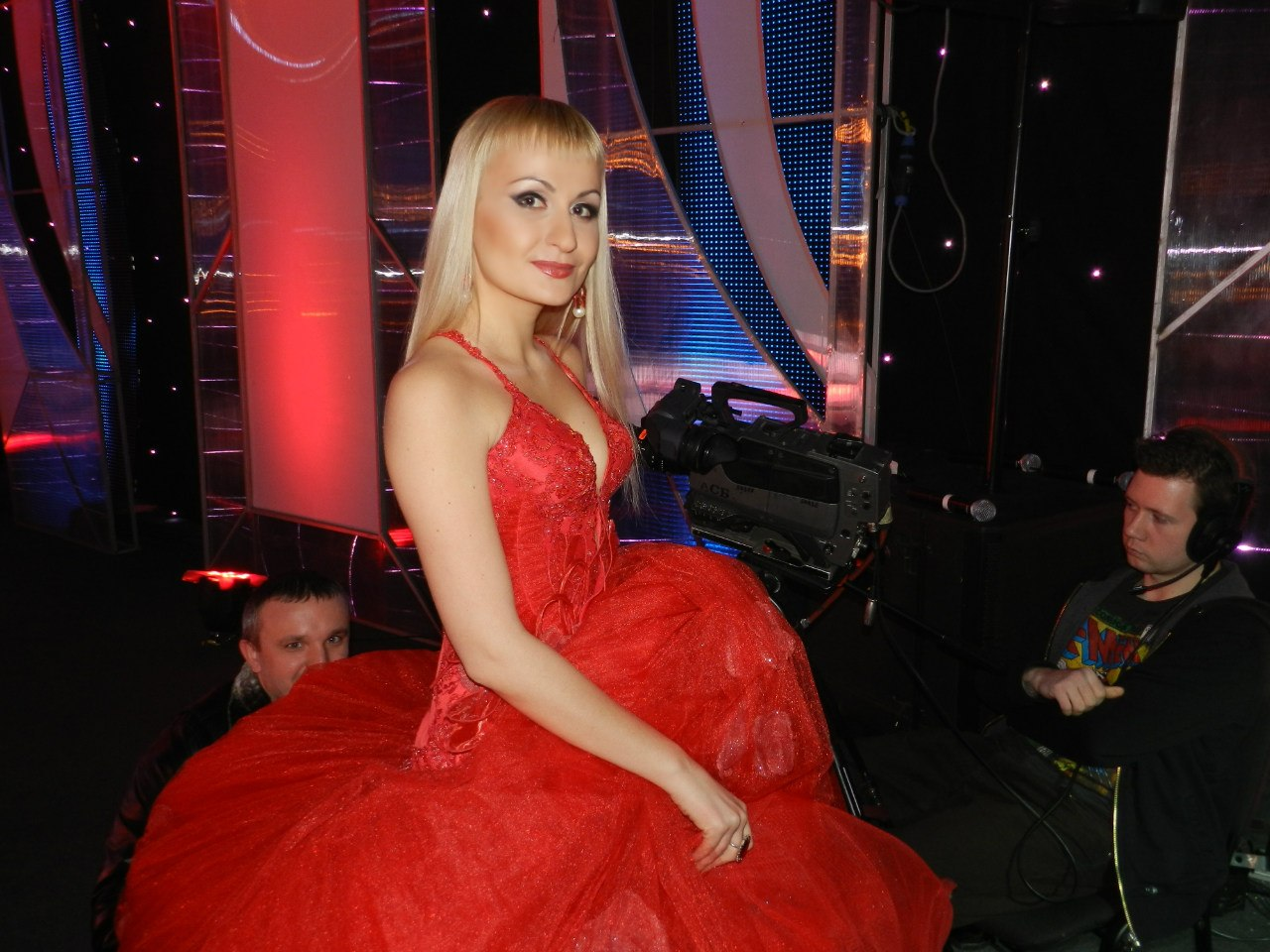
- AngeliyA Star Concerts performance

Background information
- Born: 7 September 1987 (age 39); Kyiv, Ukraine
- Origin: Ukraine
- Genres: Pop; Eurodance
- Occupations: Singer; songwriter; TV presenter
- Years active: 2002–present
- Label: Bandamusic
- Website: angeliya.su

AngeliyA (Russian: АнгелиЯ; born 7 September 1987) is a Ukrainian popular singer, songwriter and TV-presenter, she creates songs that are often characterized by themes of love, relationships, and life of the people, as well as female empowerment, lyrics of her songs are sensually and soulful, and even very often autobiographical.

== Music career ==
AngeliyA debuted her singing career by performing in various singing and dancing competitions as a child, and rose to fame in the mid-2000s with the hit single "We are in contact". The track became the undisputed number one pop song of the year, dominating the Eastern Europe pop, urban world which gaining a lot of radio airplay. In 2010 she released the music video to the single "We are in contact" which blew up online space and the song entered the best music compilations including "Golden Gramophone", "Russian Radio Hits», «Best on the Europa plus" etc.

=== 2011–2014: Early career ===
In early 2011, AngeliyA began working on more songs. Meanwhile, she collaborated with Young Paperboyz on single "I am 2011", which peaked at number two on the KISS FM Top 100, and reached the top ten in ten other countries

In summer 2012, AngeliyA released the emotive video for her romantic pop ballad "You are mine", which was a major worldwide success, top music charts in Ukraine, the Baltic countries (Estonia, Latvia and Lithuania) and the Commonwealth of Independent States.

AngeliyA has featured on the covers of a number of magazines and has won a lot of award including Prize winner of the American Music Project "Atlantic Breeze" award, performance at the concert program on the main stage of EURO 2012 in Ukraine.

AngeliyA also has worked on television shows, she became a presenter of author's entertainment TV program "Night Show on the First" and "Diary Contest Eurovision" at the First National TV Channel of Ukraine.

In mid-2013 AngeliyA released single and clip "Soul is tired" which achieved success on musical TV channels of Eastern Europe and the Baltic States (Estonia, Latvia and Lithuania) and nominated as the best video of the year for OE Video Music Awards on the entertainment channel OE. With English version of this song called "Love Is Life" singer entered the best Top finalists of Eurovision Song Contest 2013 in Ukraine. In summer 2013, she was awarded the honorary title "Honored Artist of Ukraine" for outstanding creative achievements and 11 years of composing and concert activities.

In 2014 AngeliyA presented the song "Sochi 2014", which has become one of the best songs dedicated to the Winter Olympic Games in Sochi. This song was accompanied by a lot of public events at the Olympics. In the same year AngeliyA made a new modern interpretation of the folk song «Gulyanochka» and became the winner of the TV project Folk Music.

=== 2015–present ===
In early 2015, AngeliyA went to a concert tour in support of her new song "Ti Amo" in Europe, and then visited India to shoot a new entertainment program and performed. During her stay in India, AngeliyA and her team removed the clip for the new dance single «I Wanna Fly With You».
