= Vilibald Vuco =

Croatian footballer (born 1996)

Personal information
- Full name: Vilibald Vuco
- Date of birth: 15 July 1996 (age 30)
- Place of birth: Split, Croatia
- Position: Midfielder

Team information
- Current team: Zagreb

Youth career
- 2007–2011: Hajduk Split
- 2011–2015: Hrvatski Dragovoljac

Senior career*
Years	Team	Apps	(Gls)
2015–2016	Hrvatski Dragovoljac	12	(0)
2015	→ Stupnik (loan)	14	(1)
2016–2017	Rudeš	48	(3)
2018	Alavés B	3	(1)
2019	Rudeš	13	(1)
2019–2020	Hrvatski Dragovoljac	22	(0)
2021	Radomlje	9	(1)
2021	Hrvatski Dragovoljac	8	(0)
2024	Zelina		
2024–	Zagreb		
- * Club domestic league appearances and goals as of 20:20, 20 January 2020 (UTC)

Vilibald Vuco (born 15 July 1996) is a Croatian professional footballer who most recently played for Croatian club NK Zagreb as a midfielder.

He is the son of Croatian rock and folk musician Siniša Vuco, and the brother of Croatian trap musician Brigita Vuco.

== Club career ==
Born in Split, Vuco joined NK Hrvatski Dragovoljac's youth setup in 2011, from HNK Hajduk Split. After a short-term loan deal at NK Stupnik in 2015, he made his debut for the club before moving to NK Rudeš in January 2016.

Vuco contributed with three goals in 26 matches during the 2016–17 campaign, as his side achieved promotion to 1. HNL. He made his debut in the category on 16 July 2017, starting in a 1–1 away draw against NK Osijek.

On 1 February 2018, Vuco moved to Rudeš' affiliate club Deportivo Alavés, signing an 18-month deal and being assigned to the reserves in Tercera División.
