= Brigita Vuco =

Croatian singer-songwriter

By Brigita
- Born: Brigita Ivka Vuco; February 11, 1999 (age 27); Split, Croatia
- Other names: Brigita, Brigita Vuco, By Brigita
- Occupation: Singer
- Years active: 2020–present
- Children: 1
- Father: Siniša Vuco
- Relatives: Vilibald Vuco (brother)
- Musical career
- Genres: Trap music
- Instrument: Vocals

Brigita Ivka Vuco (born 11 February 1999), known professionally as By Brigita, is a Croatian singer-songwriter. She is the youngest daughter of Siniša Vuco, a songwriter and singer, who is best known for his blend of hard rock music and pop-folk music.

== Life and career ==
Brigita was born on February 11, 1999, in Split, as the youngest daughter of Croatian recording artist Siniša Vuco. In August 2020, it was speculated in the media that Brigita would present herself on the Croatian music scene with her first song, which is in a different genre of musical expression than her father's.

In December 2020, Vuco was announced as one of the 14 finalists for Dora 2021, the national contest in Croatia to select the country's Eurovision Song Contest 2021 entry. She performed the song "Noći pijane" (Drunken Nights), which she wrote and composed herself, and placed thirteen with a total of 15 points.

Brigita is the first trap performer in Dora's history.

== Discography ==
=== Singles ===
- "Noći pijane" (2021)
