= Siniša Vuco =

- Also known as: Vuco; Sinnie Wolf; General Vasilij Mitu; Admiral Koljač
- Born: Siniša Vuco; 29 April 1971 (age 55); Split, SR Croatia, Yugoslavia (now Croatia)
- Genres: Turbo-folk; pop-folk; folk rock; rock; hard rock; heavy metal; pop; pop-rock
- Occupations: Singer; musician; composer
- Instruments: Guitar; bass guitar; vocals
- Years active: 1989–present
- Label: Croatia Records

Siniša Vuco better known as Vuco, is a Croatian recording artist and singer and songwriter.

Vuco is best known in Croatia for his blend of hard rock and pop folk genres, emphasized by his baritone rock vocals. Many of his songs have recurring themes such as addiction, alcoholism, unrequited love, misfortune and suffering.

== Career beginnings ==
Siniša Vuco began his career as a pop musician, but his big break came in early 1990s when he appeared in the Split Music Festival. He presented himself as one of the first Croatian Pop musicians to reintroduce the accordion, Roma music and oriental sounds in his work, in a time when it was considered "politically incorrect" for Croatians to do so because it was somehow redolent of Turbo-folk music. Vuco, much to the dismay of pop/folk critics and social commentators, introduced elements of turbo-folk to Croatian pop music.

Although officially frowned upon, such trends apparently struck the chord among a large section of the Croatian public and Vuco acquired a loyal following. One of his newer singles is "Volim narodno" (I Love/I Like Folk) in which he copied parts from popular song "We Will Rock You". The song is a duet with popular Serbian folk singer Mitar Mirić. He has also collaborated with other big names in the industry, which include Džej Ramadanovski and Vesna Zmijanac.

== Rock background and various projects ==
Apart from having a turbo-folk career, Siniša Vuco is a founder and vocalist and guitarist for the hard rock band Živo blato. While playing for Živo blato, he takes the stage name General Vasilij Mitu. He is also a member of the heavy metal band Klanje ljudi, for which he performs using the stage name Admiral Koljač (transl. Admiral Slayer). Vuco played bass in a thrash metal band Evil Blood, alongside drummer Toni Silobrčić and vocalist Denis Gabrić (better known as Bat Connan). He also gained acclaim as the vocalist for heavy metal band Witchcraft.

Vuco has also written songs for others, some of which have become semi-hits, for example the song "Stari se" was written by him for Thompson.

He is infamous for his often eccentric performances; for example: Klanje ljudi's Split concert of 2004 stands out as lambs were being roasted on stage as the band played, and spectators could simply walk up to the stage and grab a piece of lamb to eat.

Similar appearances occurred during the 2003 parliamentary elections when he appeared on Croatian Radiotelevision as an independent candidate. Although many in Croatian public considered his TV presentation to be the most original and the most entertaining part of the entire campaign, most people saw his candidacy more as a publicity stunt than a genuine effort to start a political career.

== Personal life ==
Siniša Vuco was married twice and divorced once. He has four children, including Vilibald and Brigita.

== Albums ==
A gdje si ti?

Studio album by Siniša Vuco
- Released: 1993
- Recorded: 1993
- Genres: Folk, pop rock
- Label: Croatia
- Producers: Siniša Vuco, Željko Šparmajer

Siniša Vuco chronology
''A gdje si ti?'' (1993)	Vuco II (1995)

- 1993 - A gdje si ti? (lit. 'But where are you?') is the debut album of Croatian singer Siniša Vuco. It was released in 1993 on the Croatia Records record label. A gdje si ti was recorded and mixed in Tomislav Mrduljaš's studio in Split. Apart from standard CD release, this album was released both in LP record and a cassette format.

Track listing

1. "Dobro večer tugo" – 3:56
2. "Nek' sam pijan" – 3:12
3. "A gdje si ti?" – 3:17
4. "Proklete da su" – 2:53
5. "Nedjelja" – 3:54
6. "Bog me kaznio" – 3:28
7. "Molim te, vrati se" – 3:34
8. "Tebe nema" – 3:52
9. "Proljeće" – 2:56
10. "Ostajem u suzama" – 3:35
11. "Ti si me izdala" – 2:57
12. "Kada odem ja" – 4:06

Vuco II

Studio album by Siniša Vuco
- Released: 1995
- Recorded: 1993, 1994
- Genre: Rock
- Length: 33:24
- Label: Croatia Records
- Producers: Siniša Vuco; Željko Sparmajer; Tomislav Mrduljaš

Siniša Vuco chronology
A gdje si ti? (1993)	''Vuco II'' (1995)	Vuco III (1997)

- 1995 - Vuco II is the second album of Croatian singer Siniša Vuco. It was released in 1995 on the Croatia Records record label. Vuco II contains all major hits by Vuco, which makes it one of his best albums. Songs "Crna ženo", as well as festival songs "Sestro, odlazi" and "Siromasi" were all very popular songs, and are one of his best songs to date. This album was best-selling album in Croatia in 1995. It also contains a rock ballad "Rajske kočije". Album was recorded in a studio "TM" in Split.

Track listing

1. "Crna ženo" – 3:49
2. "Pije mi se" – 4:13
3. "Sestro, odlazi" – 2:40
4. "Rajske kočije" – 3:49
5. "Draga" – 3:25
6. "Siromasi" – 3:55
7. "Duša seljačka" – 4:57
8. "Vode se ne napila" – 3:26
9. "Zbogom majko, zbogom oče" – 3:09
10. "Razbijam ovu čašu" – 3:26
11. "Putuj" – 2:58
12. "Petar Krešimir" – 4:50

Vuco III

Studio album by Siniša Vuco
- Released: 1997
- Recorded: 1996
- Genres: Pop rock, folk
- Label: Croatia
- Producer: Silvije Škare

Siniša Vuco chronology
Vuco II (1995)	''Vuco III'' (1997)	Vuco IV (1997)

- 1997 - Vuco III is the third album of Croatian singer Siniša Vuco. It was released in 1997 on the Croatia Records record label. Unlike Vuco's last album Vuco II, this one was poorly received. Producer of his earlier recordings Željko Šparmajer was absent in recording of this album, which basically makes it without any hits. This fact made Vuco release another album the same year as this one called Vuco IV. Vuco III was recorded in a studio "Sound & Vision" in Makarska, in summer and autumn of 1996. It was mixed in Croatia Records studio in Zagreb, during autumn and winter of 1996.

Track listing

1. "Danas je moj dan" – 3:38
2. "Curice u gradu" – 2:51
3. "Zabluda" – 4:54
4. "Sretan put" – 3:33
5. "Gdje si sad?" – 5:05
6. "Nevjero" – 3:21
7. "Vrijeme prolazi" – 3:49
8. "U našem dvorištu" – 3:51
9. "Udavi me, udavi" – 3:30
10. "Pjesma ratnika" – 5:32

Vuco IV

Studio album by Siniša Vuco
- Released: 1997
- Recorded: ?
- Genre: Folk Rock
- Length: 39:39
- Label: Croatia Records
- Producer: ?

Siniša Vuco chronology
Vuco III (1997)	''Vuco IV'' (1997)	Volim piti i ljubiti (1998)

- 1997 - Vuco IV is the fourth album of Croatian singer Siniša Vuco. It was released in 1997 on the Croatia Records record label.

Track listing

1. "Evo mene Dunave" – 4:14
2. "Upamtit ćeš" – 3:23
3. "Zbogom ženo" – 3:00
4. "Uzalud" – 3:34
5. "Mornarska" – 4:17
6. "E, draga, draga" – 4:38
7. "Moja draga putuje" – 3:15
8. "Splite grade" – 3:29
9. "Razbolio se ja" – 4:08
10. "Šta je, šta je?" – 3:40
11. "Ulica" – 3:23
12. "Zaboravi" – 5:26

Volim piti i ljubiti

Studio album by Siniša Vuco
- Released: 1998
- Recorded: ?
- Genre: ?
- Length: ??:??
- Label: Croatia Records
- Producer: ?

Siniša Vuco chronology
Vuco IV (1997)	''Volim piti i ljubiti'' (1998)	Vuco: najveći hitovi (2000)

- 1998 - Volim piti i ljubiti is the fifth album of Croatian singer Siniša Vuco. It was released in 1998 on the Croatia Records record label. It is probably the most famous of all the albums he has produced.

Track listing

1. "Volim piti i ljubiti" – 3:25
2. "Pusti me da pijem" – 3:18
3. "Podigla me iz pepela" – 3:23
4. "Na vjenčanju tvome" – 3:02
5. "Nijedna me htjela nije" – 2:58
6. "Pijanica" – 3:03
7. "Rujna zora" – 3:07
8. "Ima žena, nema broja" – 3:24
9. "Nisi ti od jučer" – 3:27
10. "Mostarska" – 3:55
- 2001: Vuco 2001
- 2002: Vrati se, vrati

Track listing

1. "Calen Bite" - 3:28
2. "Vrati se, vrati" - 4:19, featuring Vesna Zmijanac
3. "Klošar" - 2:56
4. "Poslije Njega" - 3:45
5. "Da Se Sredim" - 3:09
6. "Napijte Me, Napijte" - 3:29
7. "Ne Volim Te" - 3:23
8. "Pijem Vino (I Ono Mene)" - 3:02
9. "Nije Meni Suđeno" - 3:14
10. "Cetina" - 4:28
- 2004: Jesam!

Track listing

1. "U kafani" – 3:19
2. "Sanja" – 3:06
3. "U napad" – 4:09
4. "Idi do vraga" – 5:48, along with "Mjesec žut" were originally recorded in 1996, but due to political messages, they were not released on the demand by the publisher. They were released on this album.
5. "E, da si bar tu" – 4:16
6. "Maska" – 2:37
7. "Ljeto 2004" – 3:02
8. "Umrijet ćeš ti od starosti" – 3:27
9. "Zamaglio se pogled (Ne daj se nikome)" – 3:50
10. "Od ljubavi davne ne živi se" – 3:50
11. "Mjesec žut" – 5:10
12. "Cetina" – 4:28
- 2004: Volim narodno
- 2007: Ne mogu ti to oprostiti
- 2011: Vuco XI

=== Compilation albums ===
- 2000: Najveći hitovi
- 2003: Megamix
- 2007: Zlatna Kolekcija
- 2012: Najlepše ljubavne pjesme
- 2016: The Best of Collection
