= Croatia in the Eurovision Song Contest 2013 =

- Eurovision Song Contest 2013
- Country: Croatia
- Selection process: Internal selection
- Announcement date: Artist: 11 February 2013; Song: 27 February 2013

Competing entry
- Song: "Mižerja"
- Artist: Klapa s Mora
- Songwriters: Goran Topolovac

Placement
- Semi-final result: Failed to qualify (13th)

Participation chronology

Croatia was represented at the Eurovision Song Contest 2013 with the song "Mižerja" written by Goran Topolovac. The song was performed by the group Klapa s Mora, which was selected internally by the Croatian broadcaster Croatian Radiotelevision (HRT) on 11 February 2013 to represent Croatia at the 2013 contest in Malmö, Sweden. Their song "Mižerja" was presented to the public on 27 February 2013 during a live streamed press conference.

Croatia was drawn to compete in the first semi-final of the Eurovision Song Contest which took place on 14 May 2013. Performing during the show in position 4, "Mižerja" was not announced among the top 10 entries of the first semi-final and therefore did not qualify to compete in the final. It was later revealed that Croatia placed thirteenth out of the 16 participating countries in the semi-final with 38 points.

== Background ==
Prior to the 2013 contest, Croatia had participated in the Eurovision Song Contest twenty times since its first entry in 1993. The nation's best result in the contest was fourth, which it achieved on two occasions: in 1996 with the song "Sveta ljubav" performed by Maja Blagdan and in 1999 with the song "Marija Magdalena" performed by Doris Dragović. Following the introduction of semi-finals for the 2004, Croatia had thus far featured in five finals. Between 2010 and 2012, the Croatian entries failed to qualify from the semi-finals; the last time Croatia competed in the final was in 2009 with the song "Lijepa Tena" performed by Igor Cukrov featuring Andrea. In 2012, Croatia failed to qualify to the final with Nina Badrić and the song "Nebo".

The Croatian national broadcaster, Croatian Radiotelevision (HRT), broadcasts the event within Croatia and organises the selection process for the nation's entry. HRT confirmed Croatia's participation in the 2013 Eurovision Song Contest on 14 September 2012. Between 1993 and 2011, HRT organised the national final Dora in order to select the Croatian entry for the Eurovision Song Contest. In 2012, the Croatian broadcaster opted to internally select the entry, a method that was continued for their 2013 participation.

== Before Eurovision ==
=== Internal selection ===
On 26 November 2012, the Croatian national broadcaster HRT opened a submission period where songwriters were able to submit songs in "traditional klapa style" to the broadcaster with the deadline on 26 December 2012. Both the composer and lyricist were required to be citizens of the Republic of Croatia. 60 songs were received by the broadcaster during the submission period. On 26 November 2012, HRT announced "Mižerja" as the song that would be performed by a klapa ensemble at the Eurovision Song Contest. The song was written by Goran Topolovac, and was selected by a three-member expert committee consisting of Velimir Đuretić (Head of Entertainment at HRT), Nikša Bratoš (music producer and arranger) and Ante Pecotić (music producer and composer).

On 11 February 2013, HRT announced the six members that would form the klapa ensemble: Marko Škugor from klapa Kampanel (first tenor), Ante Galić from klapa Sinj (second tenor), Nikša Antica from klapa Kampanel (first baritone), Leon Bataljaku from klapa Crikvenica (second baritone), Ivica Vlaić from klapa Sebenico (bass) and Bojan Kavedžija from klapa Grdelin (bass). The members were selected by an alternate three-member expert committee consisting of Velimir Đuretić, Nikša Bratoš and Mojmir Čačija (klapa producer). "Mižerja" and the name of the ensemble, Klapa s Mora, was presented on 27 February 2013 during a live streamed press conference at the Studio 10 of HRT in Zagreb.

Results of the song selection (Top 2)
Song	Songwriter	Place
"Mižerja"	Goran Topolovac	1
"Cili svit za bili cvit"	Miroslav Buljan	2

=== Preparation ===
An English version of "Mižerja" entitled "Hard Times" was recorded and released through a preview video produced by the Croatian National Tourist Board on 29 March. In late early April, Klapa s Mora filmed the music video for "Mižerja", which was directed by Zoran Nikolić and filmed in Kaštela and Trogir. The music video was released to the public on 11 April.

== At Eurovision ==
According to Eurovision rules, all nations with the exceptions of the host country and the "Big Five" (France, Germany, Italy, Spain and the United Kingdom) are required to qualify from one of two semi-finals in order to compete for the final; the top ten countries from each semi-final progress to the final. The European Broadcasting Union (EBU) split up the competing countries into six different pots based on voting patterns from previous contests, with countries with favourable voting histories put into the same pot. On 17 January 2013, an allocation draw was held which placed each country into one of the two semi-finals, as well as which half of the show they would perform in. Croatia was placed into the first semi-final, to be held on 14 May 2013, and was scheduled to perform in the first half of the show.

Once all the competing songs for the 2013 contest had been released, the running order for the semi-finals was decided by the shows' producers rather than through another draw, so that similar songs were not placed next to each other. Croatia was set to perform in position 4, following the entry from Slovenia and before the entry from Denmark.

The two semi-finals were broadcast in Croatia on HRT 2 and the final was broadcast on HRT 1, while the first semi-final and final were also broadcast via radio on HR 2. All broadcasts featured commentary by Duško Ćurlić. The Croatian spokesperson, who announced the Croatian votes during the final, was Uršula Tolj.

=== Semi-final ===
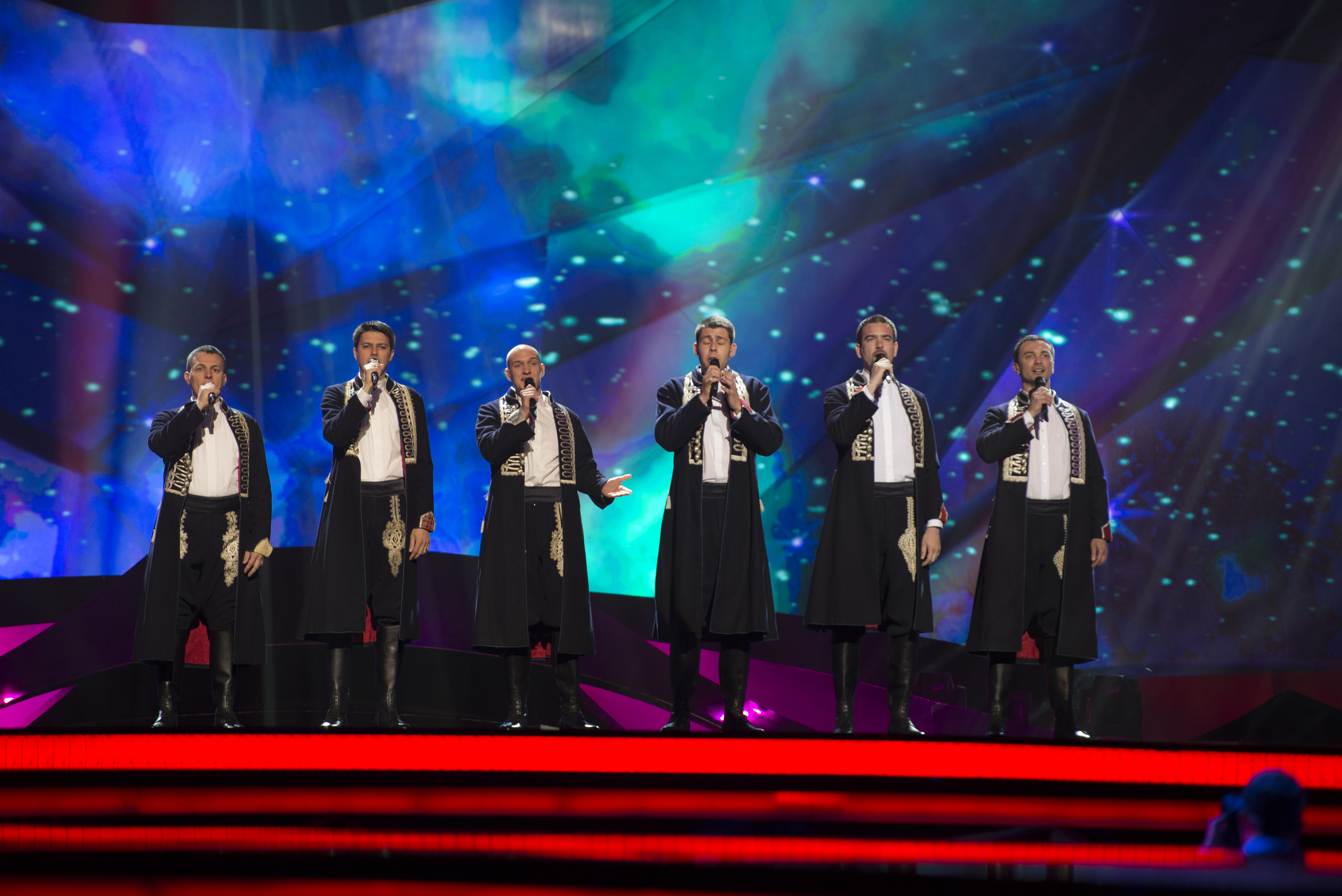
Klapa s Mora during a rehearsal before the first semi-final

Klapa s Mora took part in technical rehearsals on 6 and 10 May, followed by dress rehearsals on 13 and 14 May. This included the jury show on 13 May where the professional juries of each country watched and voted on the competing entries.

The Croatian performance featured the members of Klapa s Mora dressed in traditional uniforms worn by Croatian knights. The stage background displayed a colourful starry night background. The group also performed choreography which they walked more towards the front of the stage. The choreographer for the Croatian performance was Snježana Abramović Milković, while graphics were created by Ivan Marušića Klifu.

At the end of the show, Croatia was not announced among the top 10 entries in the first semi-final and therefore failed to qualify to compete in the final. It was later revealed that Croatia placed thirteenth in the semi-final, receiving a total of 38 points.

=== Voting ===
Voting during the three shows consisted of 50 percent public televoting and 50 percent from a jury deliberation. The jury consisted of five music industry professionals who were citizens of the country they represent. This jury was asked to judge each contestant based on: vocal capacity; the stage performance; the song's composition and originality; and the overall impression by the act. In addition, no member of a national jury could be related in any way to any of the competing acts in such a way that they cannot vote impartially and independently.

Following the release of the full split voting by the EBU after the conclusion of the competition, it was revealed that Croatia had placed tenth with the public televote and thirteenth with the jury vote in the first semi-final. In the public vote, Croatia received an average rank of 8.00, while with the jury vote, Croatia received an average rank of 9.95.

Below is a breakdown of points awarded to Croatia and awarded by Croatia in the first semi-final and grand final of the contest. The nation awarded its 12 points to Denmark in the semi-final and to Ukraine in the final of the contest.

==== Points awarded to Croatia ====
Points awarded to Croatia (Semi-final 1)
Score	Country
12 points	
10 points	Serbia
8 points	
7 points	
6 points	Ukraine
5 points	Austria; Montenegro
4 points	Russia
3 points	Netherlands
2 points	Slovenia
1 point	Cyprus; Ireland; Lithuania

==== Points awarded by Croatia ====
Points awarded by Croatia (Semi-final 1)
Score	Country
12 points	Denmark
10 points	Serbia
8 points	Russia
7 points	Ukraine
6 points	Montenegro
5 points	Slovenia
4 points	Austria
3 points	Belgium
2 points	Ireland
1 point	Moldova

Points awarded by Croatia (Final)
Score	Country
12 points	Ukraine
10 points	Denmark
8 points	Italy
7 points	Azerbaijan
6 points	Russia
5 points	Greece
4 points	Hungary
3 points	Norway
2 points	Netherlands
1 point	Sweden
