= 88FM =

Radio station in Israel (1995–2017)

- Logo of 88FM at the time of its closure
- Israel

Programming
- Language: Hebrew

Ownership
- Owner: Israel Broadcasting Authority

History
- First air date: 1995; 31 years ago
- Last air date: May 2017; 9 years ago

88FM was an Israeli national radio station playing alternative music. Established in 1995, it was owned and operated by the Israel Broadcasting Authority (IBA) until the IBA halted operations in 2017 and the station was succeeded by the Israeli Public Broadcasting Corporation's Kan 88.

== History ==
88FM was established in 1995 and played a range of genres including alternative music, jazz and world music. It was noted for the autonomy granted to its presenters with regards to the choice of music played.

In 2005, plans to stop broadcasting 88FM were criticised by artists including Arik Einstein, Yehudit Ravitz and Ehud Banai.

In 2009, the station aired the first inauguration of Barack Obama.

=== Closure ===
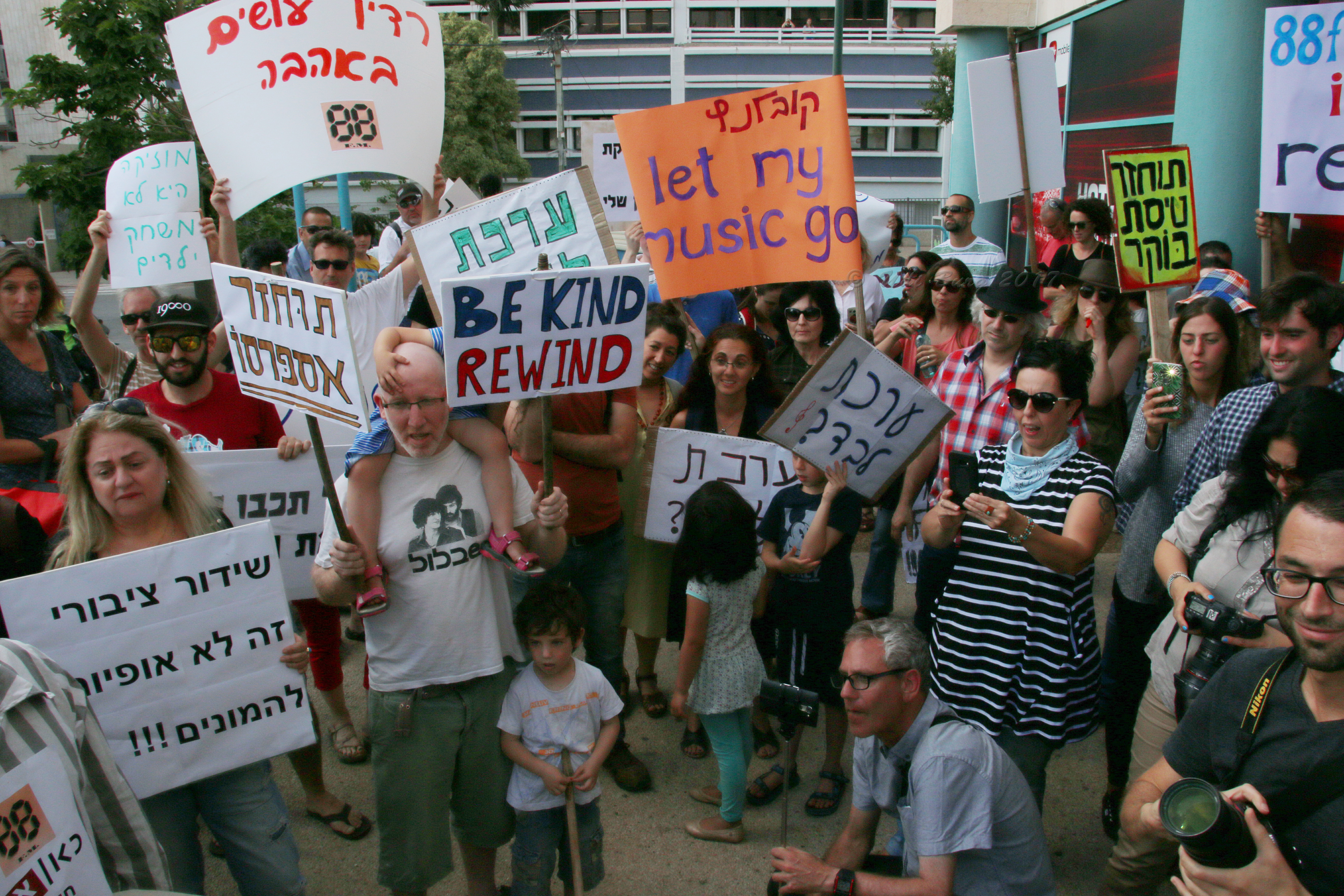
Protest against 88FM's closure outside the IBPC, 1 June 2017

88FM stopped broadcasting May 2017 when the Israel Broadcasting Authority was replaced with the new Israeli Public Broadcasting Corporation. The station was succeeded by Kan 88, which had an increased emphasis on popular music.

Mishmar 88 (Hebrew: משמר 88), a fan club of 88FM, organised a demonstration in Tel Aviv against the rebrand and change of format on 1 June 2017.

== Presenters ==
Presenters at 88FM included Boaz Cohen, Ofer Nachshon. and Dubi Lenz. Following the establishment of Kan 88 in 2017, Cohen moved to eco99fm later that year.

== See also ==
- BBC Radio 6 Music
