= Eurovision Song Contest 2013 =

International song competition

- We Are One

Dates and venue
- Semi-final 1: 14 May 2013
- Semi-final 2: 16 May 2013
- Final: 18 May 2013
- Venue: Malmö Arena; Malmö, Sweden

Organisation
- Organiser: European Broadcasting Union (EBU)
- Executive supervisor: Jon Ola Sand

Production
- Host broadcaster: Sveriges Television (SVT)
- Directors: Daniel Jelinek; Robin Hofwander; Sven Stojanović
- Executive producer: Martin Österdahl
- Presenter: Petra Mede

Participants
- Number of entries: 39
- Number of finalists: 26
- Returning countries: Armenia
- Non-returning countries: Bosnia and Herzegovina; Portugal; Slovakia; Turkey
- Participation map: Finalist countries Countries eliminated in the semi-finals Countries that participated in the past but not in 2013

Vote
- Voting system: Each country awarded 12, 10, 8–1 points to their 10 favourite songs.
- Winning song: Denmark; "Only Teardrops"

The Eurovision Song Contest 2013 was the 58th edition of the Eurovision Song Contest. It consisted of two semi-finals on 14 and 16 May and a final on 18 May 2013, held at the Malmö Arena in Malmö, Sweden, and presented by Petra Mede. It was organised by the European Broadcasting Union (EBU) and host broadcaster Sveriges Television (SVT), which staged the event after winning the 2012 contest for Sweden with the song "Euphoria" by Loreen. It was the first time that only one host had presented the show since the 1995 contest. Eric Saade, who had previously represented Sweden in 2011, acted as the green room host in the final.

Broadcasters from thirty-nine countries participated in the contest, with Armenia returning after a one-year absence. Bosnia and Herzegovina, Portugal, Slovakia, and Turkey all ceased their participation for various reasons. Slovakia and Turkey have yet to return to the contest since.

The winner was the song "Only Teardrops", performed by Emmelie de Forest representing Denmark, and written by Lise Cabble, Julia Fabrin Jakobsen, and Thomas Stengaard. The song had the highest average score in both the televote and jury vote. Azerbaijan, Ukraine, Norway, and Russia rounded out the top five.

This year marked the reintroduction of the "Parade of Nations", a concept which was first used in the contest from 1959 to 1963 (with the exception of 1962) before making a one-off return in 1983. The concept had also been used, on-and-off, in the Junior Eurovision Song Contest since 2004. It sees all competing artist performing in the final presenting themselves with their national flags before the contest begins. This year, they entered the main stage by walking across a bridge over the audience. This idea has subsequently continued in every edition of the contest onwards.

The EBU reported that 170 million viewers watched the semi-finals and final of the 2013 edition.

== Location ==
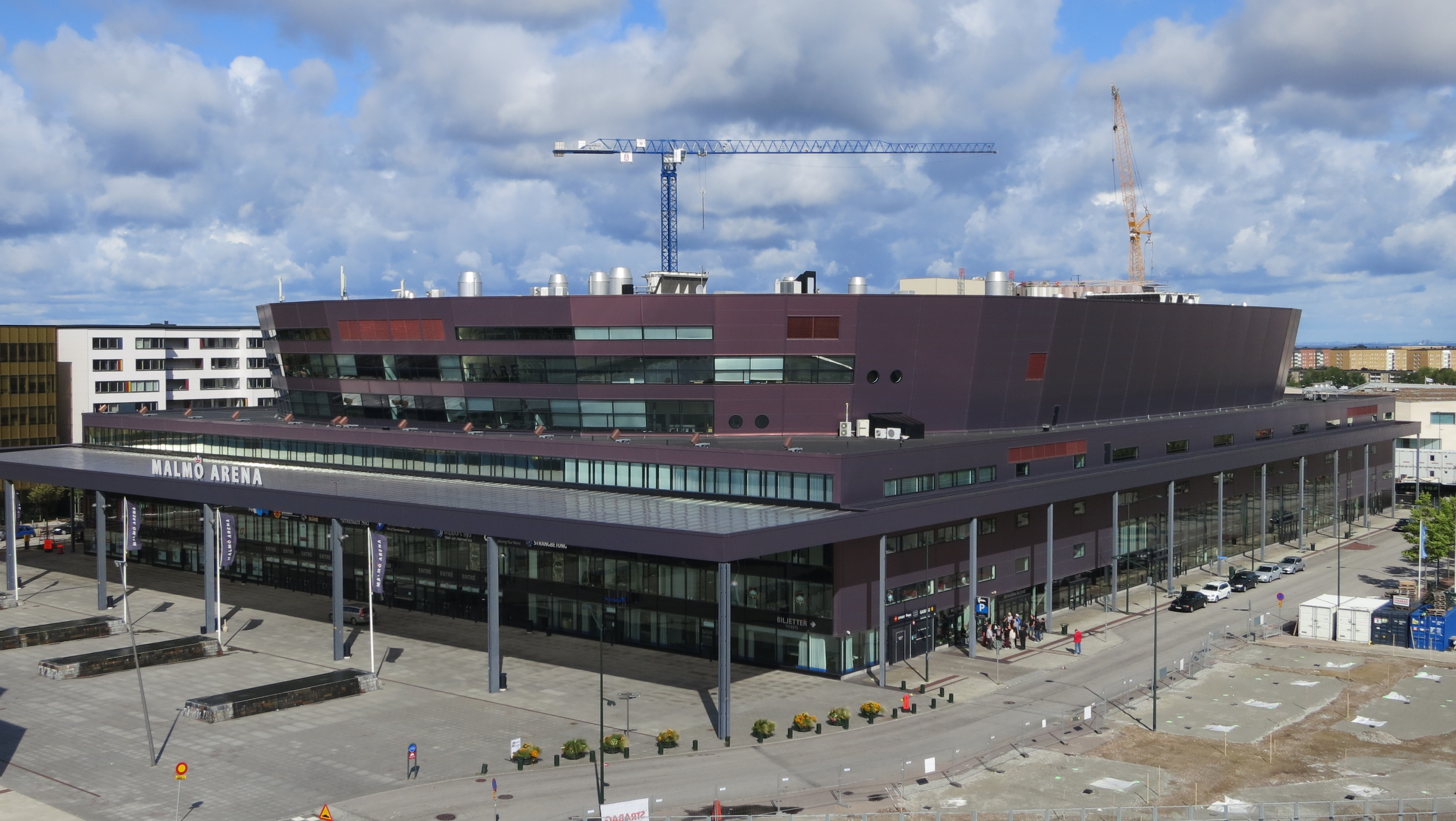
Malmö Arena, Malmö – host venue of the 2013 contest.

On 8 July 2012, the Swedish broadcaster Sveriges Television (SVT) announced that the Malmö Arena in Malmö would be the host venue for the 2013 contest. This was the fifth time after 1975, 1985, 1992 and 2000 that the competition was held in Sweden, and the second time that it was held in Malmö, after 1992. SVT had expressed the desire to host the contest at a slightly smaller venue than previous years, as well as smaller environment which is easier to dedicate and decorate for other celebrations and festivities of the event within the host city. These were factors in the choice of the Malmö Arena as the host venue, and Malmö as Sweden's third-largest city by population after Stockholm and Gothenburg, the two other initial location-bidders.

The city's proximity to the borders with Denmark and Norway also spilled over into some of the producers' actions. Denmark was eventually allocated to compete in one semi-final and Norway in the other, taking into consideration the number of Danish and Norwegian fans who were likely to travel for the contest, with the arena being relatively small and thus not suitable for accommodating both countries' fans in one semi-final. The Øresund Bridge was also used as the main artistic medium for the theme of the contest, as an expression of binding cultures.

=== Bidding phase ===
Locations of the candidate cities: the chosen host city is marked in blue, while the eliminated cities are marked in red.

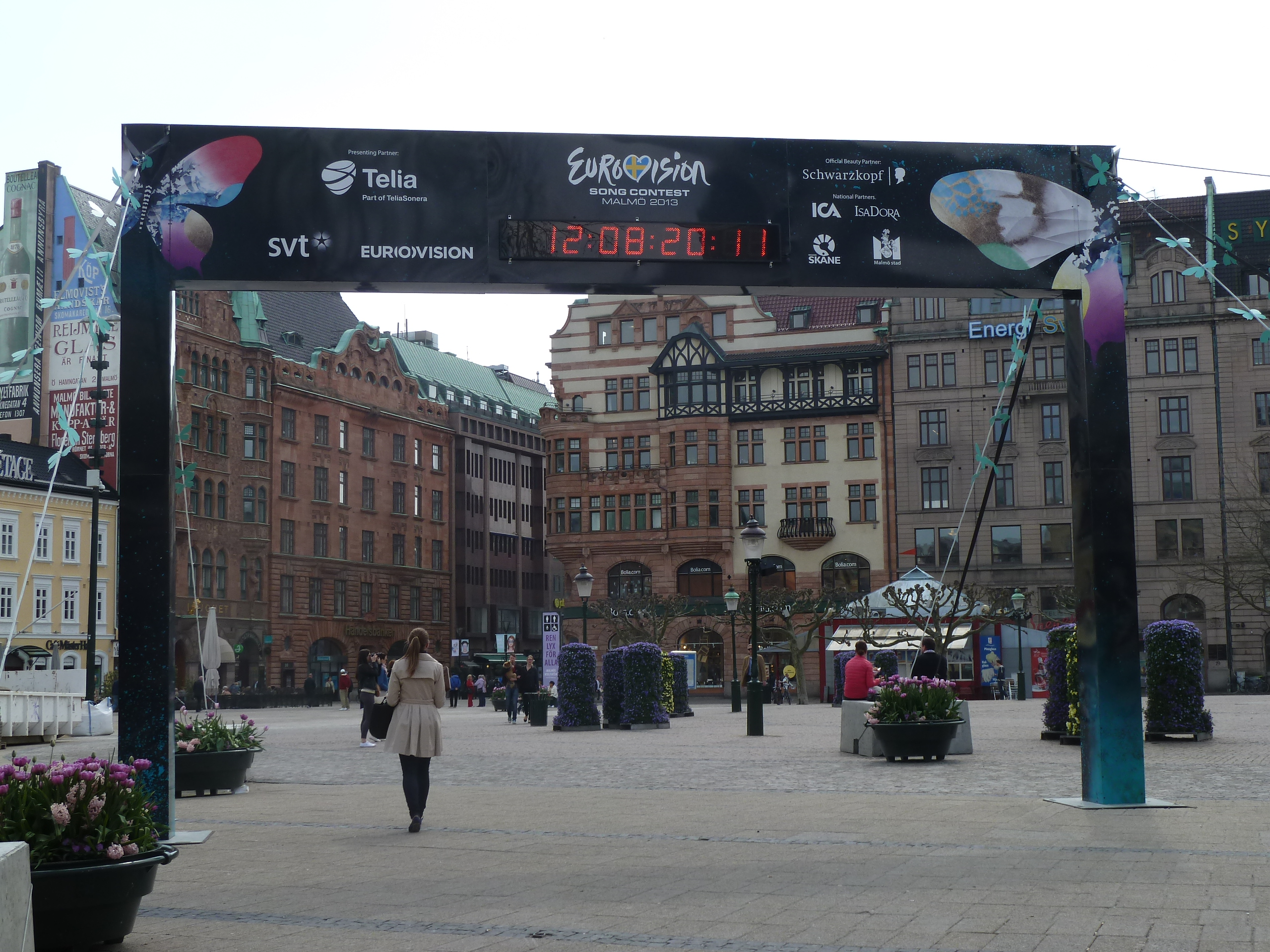
Square in Malmö before the finals, with time table demonstrating the countdown for the broadcast.

On the night of the final for the 2012 contest, the chief executive of SVT, Eva Hamilton, stated to the Swedish media that various venues in Stockholm, Gothenburg and Malmö were being considered for hosting the 2013 contest. One alternative put forward in the Expressen was to hold the competition at three venues – the semi-finals in Gothenburg and Malmö, and the final in Stockholm. This proposal was dismissed as unfeasible by SVT, which declared that the contest would be hosted in only one city.

On 20 June 2012, it was announced that Gothenburg had withdrawn from the bidding process due to the city being the host of the Göteborg Horse Show in late April 2013. There were also concerns about the availability of hotel rooms due to a variety of other events taking place in the same time frame as the Eurovision Song Contest. On 9 July, the executive producer for the 2013 contest, Martin Österdahl, told the Swedish press "that he felt uncomfortable with the decisions and choices made by the countries that had previously hosted the contest", stating that he and SVT wanted the 2013 contest to be "smaller, closer and personal". SVT also claimed that the European Broadcasting Union (EBU) also disclosed that the EBU had asked potential future host broadcasters that "there were demands about reducing the scale of the event, given the increased costs of recent editions".

The following candidate cities had provisionally reserved venues and hotel rooms, as part of their bids to host the 2013 contest. On 8 July 2012, the Malmö Arena was confirmed as the host venue for the contest. Malmö Arena is Sweden's fourth-largest indoor arena, after Friends Arena, Tele2 Arena and Globe Arena, all located in Stockholm.

Key † Host venue

City	Venue	Notes
Gothenburg	Scandinavium	The venue hosted the 1985 contest.
Gothenburg	Swedish Exhibition Centre	Withdrew on 20 June 2012.
Malmö	Malmö Arena †	The venue has hosted the Melodifestivalen heats for the past four years.
Stockholm	Friends Arena	Opened in October 2012; hosted the final of Melodifestivalen in March 2013.

== Participants ==
Eurovision Song Contest 2013 – Participation summaries by country
- Albania; Armenia; Austria; Azerbaijan; Belarus; Belgium; Bulgaria; Croatia; Cyprus; Denmark; Estonia; Finland; France; Georgia; Germany; Greece; Hungary; Iceland; Ireland; Israel; Italy; Latvia; Lithuania; Macedonia; Malta; Moldova; Montenegro; Netherlands; Norway; Romania; Russia; San Marino; Serbia; Slovenia; Spain; Sweden; Switzerland; Ukraine; United Kingdom

On 21 December 2012, the EBU announced that broadcasters from 39 countries would compete in the Eurovision Song Contest 2013. Armenia, which was last represented in 2011, confirmed that it would be returning to the contest following a one-year break. Bosnia and Herzegovina and Portugal both decided not to enter the 2013 contest due to financial difficulties, while Slovakia and Turkey did not participate for different reasons.

Valentina Monetta who had represented San Marino in 2012, returned to the contest for the second year in a row. She would also return in 2014 and in 2017. Elitsa Todorova and Stoyan Yankoulov had represented Bulgaria in 2007. Nevena Božović, representing Serbia as part of Moje 3, was the first contestant to compete in the Eurovision Song Contest after competing in the Junior Eurovision Song Contest, where she came third for Serbia in 2007. She would also represent Serbia in 2019.

Bledar Sejko, representing Albania, was the on-stage guitarist for Albania in 2011. Gor Sujyan, representing Armenia, was a backing vocalist for Armenia in 2010. Aliona Moon, representing Moldova, was a backing vocalist for Moldova in 2012. In addition, Pasha Parfeny, who represented Moldova in 2012, was the composer of the 2013 Moldovan entry and accompanied Aliona Moon on stage on the piano. Lauri Pihlap and Kaido Põldma, who were backing vocalists for Estonia, had won Eurovision as part of the group 2XL for Estonia in 2001, together with Dave Benton and Tanel Padar.

Eurovision Song Contest 2013 participants
Country	Broadcaster	Artist	Song	Language	Songwriter(s)
Albania	RTSH	Adrian Lulgjuraj and Bledar Sejko	"Identitet"	Albanian	Bledar Sejko; Eda Sejko
Armenia	AMPTV	Dorians	"Lonely Planet"	English	Tony Iommi; Vardan Zadoyan
Austria	ORF	Natália Kelly	"Shine"	English	Andreas Grass; Alexander Kahr; Natália Kelly; Nikola Paryla
Azerbaijan	İTV	Farid Mammadov	"Hold Me"	English	John Ballard; Ralph Charlie; Dimitris Kontopoulos
Belarus	BTRC	Alyona Lanskaya	"Solayoh"	English	Martin King; Marc Paelinck
Belgium	RTBF	Roberto Bellarosa	"Love Kills"	English	Jukka Immonen; Iain James
Bulgaria	BNT	Elitsa Todorova and Stoyan Yankoulov	"Samo shampioni" (Само шампиони)	Bulgarian	Kristian Talev; Elitsa Todorova
Croatia	HRT	Klapa s Mora	"Mižerja"	Croatian	Goran Topolovac
Cyprus	CyBC	Despina Olympiou	"An me thimasai" (Aν με θυμάσαι)	Greek	Andreas Giorgallis; Zenon Zindilis
Denmark	DR	Emmelie de Forest	"Only Teardrops"	English	Lise Cabble; Julia Fabrin Jakobsen; Thomas Stengaard
Estonia	ERR	Birgit	"Et uus saaks alguse"	Estonian	Mihkel Mattisen; Silvia Soro
Finland	Yle	Krista Siegfrids	"Marry Me"	English	Kristoffer Karlsson; Jessica Lundström; Erik Nyholm; Krista Siegfrids
France	France Télévisions	Amandine Bourgeois	"L'enfer et moi"	French	Boris Bergman; David Salkin
Georgia	GPB	Nodi Tatishvili and Sophie Gelovani	"Waterfall"	English	Erik Bernholm; Thomas G:son
Germany	NDR (Note: On behalf of the German public broadcasting consortium ARD)	Cascada	"Glorious"	English	Andres Ballinas; Tony Cornelissen; Yann Peifer; Manuel Reuter
Greece	ERT	Koza Mostra feat. Agathon Iakovidis	"Alcohol Is Free"	Greek	Ilias Kozas; Stathis Pachidis
Hungary	MTVA	ByeAlex	"Kedvesem" (Zoohacker Remix)	Hungarian	Alex Márta; Zoltán Palásti Kovács
Iceland	RÚV	Eythor Ingi	"Ég á líf"	Icelandic	Örlygur Smári; Pétur Örn Guðmundsson
Ireland	RTÉ	Ryan Dolan	"Only Love Survives"	English	Wez Devine; Ryan Dolan
Israel	IBA	Moran Mazor	"Rak Bishvilo" (רק בשבילו)	Hebrew	Chen Harari; Gal Sarig
Italy	RAI	Marco Mengoni	"L'essenziale"	Italian	Roberto Casalino; Francesco De Benedittis; Marco Mengoni
Latvia	LTV	PeR	"Here We Go"	English	Arturas Burke; Ralfs Eilands
Lithuania	LRT	Andrius Pojavis	"Something"	English	Andrius Pojavis
Macedonia	MRT	Esma and Lozano	"Pred da se razdeni" (Пред да се раздени)	Macedonian, Romani	Simeon Atanasov; Magdalena Cvetkovska; Lazar Cvetkoski; Darko Dimitrov
Malta	PBS	Gianluca	"Tomorrow"	English	Boris Cezek; Dean Muscat
Moldova	TRM	Aliona Moon	"O mie"	Romanian	Pasha Parfeny; Yuliana Scutaru
Montenegro	RTCG	Who See (Note: Performance contains uncredited live vocals from Nina Žižić)	"Igranka" (Игранка)	Montenegrin	Dejan Dedović; Mario Đorđević; Đorđe Miljenović
Netherlands	TROS	Anouk	"Birds"	English	Martin Gjerstad; Tore Johansson; Anouk Teeuwe
Norway	NRK	Margaret Berger	"I Feed You My Love"	English	Robin Lynch; Niklas Olovson; Karin Park
Romania	TVR	Cezar	"It's My Life"	English	Cristian Faur
Russia	C1R	Dina Garipova	"What If"	English	Gabriel Alares; Joakim Björnberg; Leonid Gutkin
San Marino	SMRTV	Valentina Monetta	"Crisalide (Vola)"	Italian	Mauro Balestri; Ralph Siegel
Serbia	RTS	Moje 3	"Ljubav je svuda" (Љубав је свуда)	Serbian	Saša Milošević Mare; Marina Tucaković
Slovenia	RTVSLO	Hannah	"Straight into Love"	English	Hannah Mancini; Erik Margan; Marko Primužak; Matija Rodić; Gregor Zemljič
Spain	RTVE	ESDM	"Contigo hasta el final"	Spanish	David Feito; Raquel del Rosario; Juan Luis Suárez
Sweden	SVT	Robin Stjernberg	"You"	English	Joy Deb; Linnea Deb; Joakim Harestad Haukaas; Robin Stjernberg
Switzerland	SRG SSR	Takasa	"You and Me"	English	Roman Camenzind; Fred Herrmann; Georg Schlunegger
Ukraine	NTU	Zlata Ognevich	"Gravity"	English	Karen Kavaleryan; Mikhail Nekrasov
United Kingdom	BBC	Bonnie Tyler	"Believe in Me"	English	Christopher Braide; Desmond Child; Lauren Christy

=== Other countries ===
==== Active EBU members ====
Active EBU member broadcasters in Andorra, Bosnia and Herzegovina, the Czech Republic, Luxembourg, Monaco, Morocco, Poland, Portugal and Slovakia confirmed non-participation prior to the announcement of the participants list by the EBU. Turkish broadcaster TRT did the same, citing dissatisfaction with the 2009 introduction of a mixed jury/televote voting system and the status of the "Big Five" rule.

==== Non-EBU member ====
Liechtensteiner broadcaster 1FLTV had been trying to join the EBU since 2010. Director Peter Kölbel had said that due to a lack of financial subsidies from the government, EBU membership participation to participate in the contest would be impossible to obtain until 2013 at the earliest; however, it was later announced that the country would not take part in 2013.

== Format ==
The combination of televoting and jury voting results underwent changes that were detailed in the official rules for the 2013 contest. Each member of a respective country's jury was required to rank every song, except that of their own country. The voting results from each member of a particular country's jury were combined to produce an overall ranking from first to last place. Likewise, the televoting results were also interpreted as a full ranking, taking into account the full televoting result rather than just the top ten. The combination of the jury's full ranking and the televote's full ranking produced an overall ranking of all competing entries. The song which scored the highest overall rank received 12 points, while the tenth-best ranked song received 1-point. It was announced in the official Media Handbook that an official app would also be available for voters to vote via during the contest.

Official sponsors of the broadcast were the main Swedish-Finnish telecommunication company TeliaSonera, and the German cosmetics company Schwarzkopf. The competition sponsors were the makeup company IsaDora cosmetics, the supermarket ICA and Tetra Pak.

The Stockholm based singer and actress Sarah Dawn Finer also appeared in both semi-finals and the final in sketches as the comic character Lynda Woodruff. "Lynda" presented the votes for Sweden at the previous contest in Baku. Finer also appeared in the final as herself, performing the ABBA song "The Winner Takes It All" before the results were announced. The ex-Swedish football captain Zlatan Ibrahimović was revealed on 28 April to be part of the opening segment of the Eurovision final, in a pre-recorded message welcoming viewers to Malmö, his home city. Eric Saade, who represented Sweden in 2011, was the host of the green room during the final.

=== Semi-final allocation draw ===
Results of the semi-final allocation draw Participating countries in the first semi-final Pre-qualified for the final but also voting in the first semi-final Participating countries in the second semi-final Pre-qualified for the final but also voting in the second semi-final

The draw that determined the semi-final allocation was held on 17 January 2013 at the Malmö City Hall. A draw at the EBU headquarters determined that, due to their geographical proximity with Malmö, Denmark would perform in the first semi-final, while Norway would perform in the second semi-final. This provided a maximum availability of tickets for visitors from both countries. The EBU also allocated Israel to the second semi-final after a request from the delegation in order to avoid complications with a national holiday coinciding with the date of the first semi-final. The remaining participating countries, excluding the automatic finalists (France, Germany, Italy, Spain, Sweden and the United Kingdom), were split into five pots, based on voting patterns from the previous nine years. From these pots, 15 (in addition to Denmark) were allocated to compete in the first semi-final on 14 May 2013 and 15 (in addition to Norway and Israel) were allocated to compete in the second semi-final on 16 May 2013.

The pots were calculated by the televoting partner Digame and were as follows:

Pot 1	Pot 2	Pot 3	Pot 4	Pot 5
Albania; Croatia; Macedonia; Montenegro; Serbia; Switzerland	Estonia; Finland; Iceland; Ireland; Latvia; Lithuania	Armenia; Azerbaijan; Belarus; Georgia; Russia; Ukraine	Belgium; Bulgaria; Cyprus; Greece; Malta; Netherlands	Austria; Hungary; Moldova; Romania; San Marino; Slovenia

=== Running order ===
Unlike previous years, the running order was not decided by the drawing of lots, but instead by the producers, with the aim of making the shows more exciting and ensuring that all entries had a chance to stand out, preventing those that are too similar cancelling each other out. The decision elicited mixed reactions from both fans of the contest and participating broadcasters.

The running order for the semi-finals was released on 28 March 2013. The running order for the final was determined on 17 May 2013. An additional allocation draw occurred for the final with each finalist country drawing to perform either in the first or second half of the final. The allocation draw for qualifying countries from the semi-finals occurred during the semi-final winners' press conferences following each semi-final, while the allocation draw for the Big Five countries (France, Germany, Italy, Spain and the United Kingdom) occurred during their first individual press conferences on 15 May 2013. As the host country, the running order position for Sweden in the final was exclusively determined by a draw during the heads of delegation meeting on 18 March 2013. Sweden was drawn to perform 16th in the final.

=== Graphic design ===
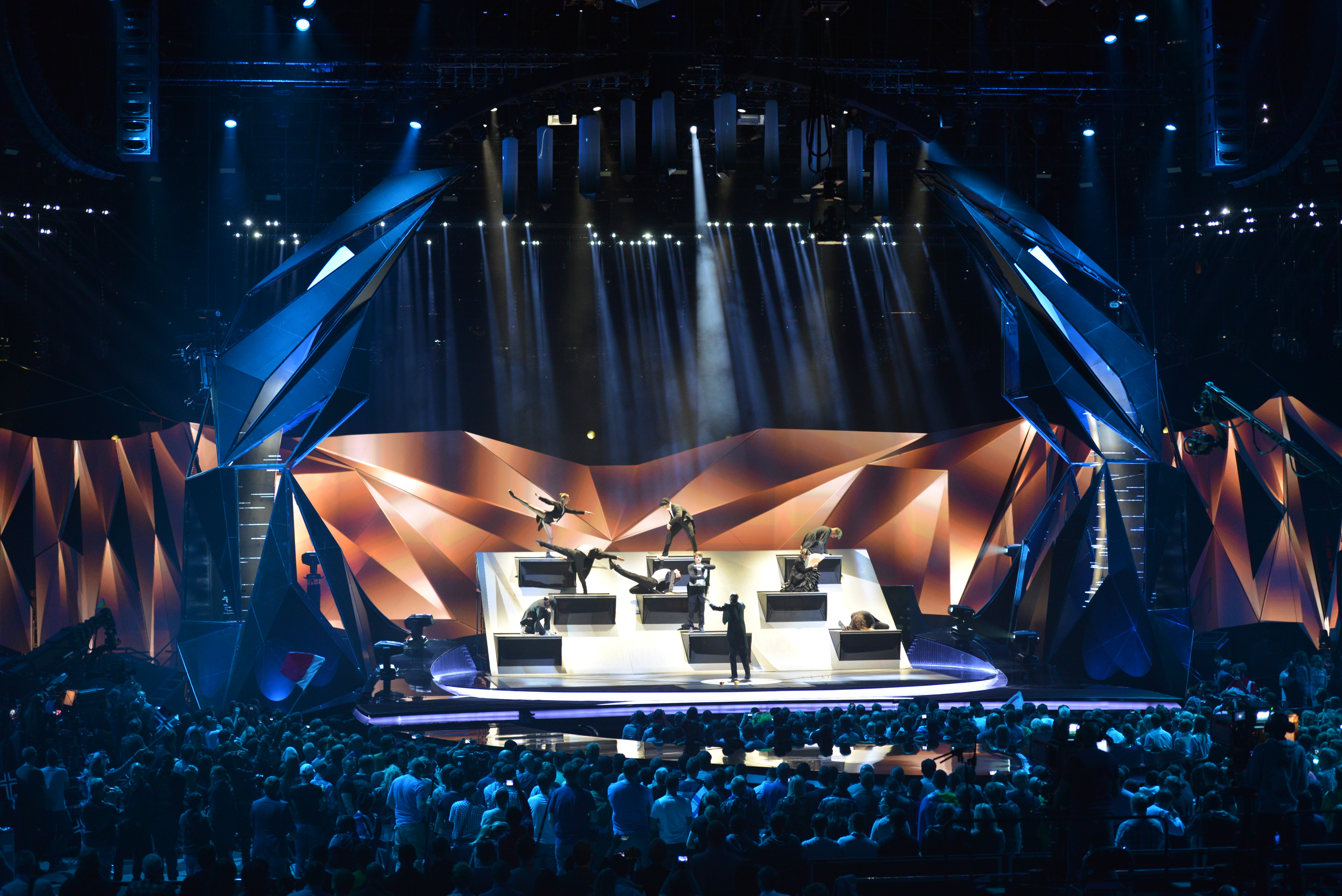
The stage with its movable parts and the audience closely surrounding it during the opening act of the second semi-final

As aforesaid, SVT wanted to make a good use of Malmö Arena's space to highlight the performances and increase the audience's visibility compared to previous years. SVT created a main stage and a smaller stage with higher-lower shifted floors, connected by a trail closely surrounded by a standing crowd from both sides of it and around the small stage. The main stage mobility was expressed as a main artistic medium at the opening act of the second semi-final and with highlighting Moldova's performance towards its finish, as a movable part beneath the singer's dress making her look gradually taller. The small stage mobility highlighted United Kingdom's performance towards its finish, lifted above the close-standing audience.

On 17 January 2013, at the semi-final allocation draw, the EBU revealed the graphic design, created by the Gothenburg-based branding agency Happy F&B for the 2013 contest, featuring a butterfly and the slogan "We Are One". The butterfly featured an array of colours and textures, while also representing the butterfly effect idea. Meanwhile, the slogan "We Are One" highlighted equality and unity of all the participating countries alongside the cultural diversity and influence of each participant.

SVT confirmed on 19 February 2013 that the postcard films, used to introduce each song in the contest, would feature each artist in their respective country, to give the viewer a personal insight of each competing participant. This broke with recent tradition of the postcards often containing short segments of life within either the host city or country of the contest. The postcards were produced by Camp David, the on-air graphics by Broken Doll, and the animation of the butterflies by visual effects studio Swiss International. In addition to the graphic design, there was a theme music for the contest, titled "Wolverine" and composed by Adam Kafe, which was used in the intros and in-between commercial breaks.

=== Host broadcaster ===
On 11 July 2012, show producer Christer Björkman advised the public not to buy tickets for the 2013 contest that are currently in circulation and instead to wait for tickets to be released through official channels. Björkman said that official tickets had not yet been released, as necessary decisions over the stage and seating plans had not yet been made. Björkman also gave reassurance that accommodation would be available, as while the organisers had booked a large quantity of hotel rooms, some may be made available to the general public. On 21 November 2012, SVT officially announced the launch of ticket sales.

On 17 October 2012, executive producer Martin Österdahl told Swedish newspaper Dagens Nyheter that SVT plans for the 2013 contest to have only one presenter for the entire event, unlike in previous years when there were up to three presenters per show. The last time only one presenter hosted the entire contest was in 1995, when the solo host was Mary Kennedy. Petra Mede was announced as the host of the 2013 contest on 28 January 2013.

== Contest overview ==
=== Semi-final 1 ===
The first semi-final took place on 14 May 2013 at 21:00 CEST. All the countries competing in this semi-final were eligible to vote, plus Italy, Sweden and the United Kingdom. The highlighted countries qualified for the final.

Qualifiers

Results of the first semi-final of the Eurovision Song Contest 2013
R/O	Country	Artist	Song	Points	Place
1	Austria	Natália Kelly	"Shine"	27	14
2	Estonia	Birgit	"Et uus saaks alguse"	52	10
3	Slovenia	Hannah	"Straight into Love"	8	16
4	Croatia	Klapa s Mora	"Mižerja"	38	13
5	Denmark	Emmelie de Forest	"Only Teardrops"	167	1
6	Russia	Dina Garipova	"What If"	156	2
7	Ukraine	Zlata Ognevich	"Gravity"	140	3
8	Netherlands	Anouk	"Birds"	75	6
9	Montenegro	Who See	"Igranka"	41	12
10	Lithuania	Andrius Pojavis	"Something"	53	9
11	Belarus	Alyona Lanskaya	"Solayoh"	64	7
12	Moldova	Aliona Moon	"O mie"	95	4
13	Ireland	Ryan Dolan	"Only Love Survives"	54	8
14	Cyprus	Despina Olympiou	"An me thimasai"	11	15
15	Belgium	Roberto Bellarosa	"Love Kills"	75	5
16	Serbia	Moje 3	"Ljubav je svuda"	46	11

=== Semi-final 2 ===
The second semi-final took place on 16 May 2013 at 21:00 CEST. All the countries competing in this semi-final were eligible to vote, plus France, Germany and Spain. The highlighted countries qualified for the final.

Qualifiers

Results of the second semi-final of the Eurovision Song Contest 2013
R/O	Country	Artist	Song	Points	Place
1	Latvia	PeR	"Here We Go"	13	17
2	San Marino	Valentina Monetta	"Crisalide (Vola)"	47	11
3	Macedonia	Esma and Lozano	"Pred da se razdeni"	28	16
4	Azerbaijan	Farid Mammadov	"Hold Me"	139	1
5	Finland	Krista Siegfrids	"Marry Me"	64	9
6	Malta	Gianluca	"Tomorrow"	118	4
7	Bulgaria	Elitsa Todorova and Stoyan Yankoulov	"Samo shampioni"	45	12
8	Iceland	Eythor Ingi	"Ég á líf"	72	6
9	Greece	Koza Mostra feat. Agathon Iakovidis	"Alcohol Is Free"	121	2
10	Israel	Moran Mazor	"Rak Bishvilo"	40	14
11	Armenia	Dorians	"Lonely Planet"	69	7
12	Hungary	ByeAlex	"Kedvesem" (Zoohacker Remix)	66	8
13	Norway	Margaret Berger	"I Feed You My Love"	120	3
14	Albania	Adrian Lulgjuraj and Bledar Sejko	"Identitet"	31	15
15	Georgia	Nodi Tatishvili and Sophie Gelovani	"Waterfall"	63	10
16	Switzerland	Takasa	"You and Me"	41	13
17	Romania	Cezar	"It's My Life"	83	5

=== Final ===
The final took place on 18 May 2013 at 21:00 CEST and was won by Denmark. The "Big Five" and the host country, Sweden, qualified directly for the final. From the two semi-finals on 14 and 16 May 2013, twenty countries qualified for the final. A total of 26 countries competed in the final and all 39 participants voted.

For the first time since the 1985 contest, which was, coincidentally, held in Sweden as well, no country of the former Yugoslavia participated in the final of the Eurovision Song Contest.

This year, for the first time ever, the winner was announced as soon as it was mathematically impossible to catch up. In this case, the winner had been determined by the 35th vote out of the 39, which came from Macedonia. This practice would continue for the next two years as well.

Denmark won with 281 points. Azerbaijan came second with 234 points, with Ukraine, Norway, Russia, Greece, Italy, Malta, Netherlands and Hungary completing the top ten. Lithuania, France, Finland, Spain and Ireland occupied the bottom five positions.

Winner

Results of the final of the Eurovision Song Contest 2013
R/O	Country	Artist	Song	Points	Place
1	France	Amandine Bourgeois	"L'Enfer et moi"	14	23
2	Lithuania	Andrius Pojavis	"Something"	17	22
3	Moldova	Aliona Moon	"O mie"	71	11
4	Finland	Krista Siegfrids	"Marry Me"	13	24
5	Spain	ESDM	"Contigo hasta el final"	8	25
6	Belgium	Roberto Bellarosa	"Love Kills"	71	12
7	Estonia	Birgit	"Et uus saaks alguse"	19	20
8	Belarus	Alyona Lanskaya	"Solayoh"	48	16
9	Malta	Gianluca	"Tomorrow"	120	8
10	Russia	Dina Garipova	"What If"	174	5
11	Germany	Cascada	"Glorious"	18	21
12	Armenia	Dorians	"Lonely Planet"	41	18
13	Netherlands	Anouk	"Birds"	114	9
14	Romania	Cezar	"It's My Life"	65	13
15	United Kingdom	Bonnie Tyler	"Believe in Me"	23	19
16	Sweden	Robin Stjernberg	"You"	62	14
17	Hungary	ByeAlex	"Kedvesem" (Zoohacker Remix)	84	10
18	Denmark	Emmelie de Forest	"Only Teardrops"	281	1
19	Iceland	Eythor Ingi	"Ég á líf"	47	17
20	Azerbaijan	Farid Mammadov	"Hold Me"	234	2
21	Greece	Koza Mostra feat. Agathon Iakovidis	"Alcohol Is Free"	152	6
22	Ukraine	Zlata Ognevich	"Gravity"	214	3
23	Italy	Marco Mengoni	"L'essenziale"	126	7
24	Norway	Margaret Berger	"I Feed You My Love"	191	4
25	Georgia	Nodi Tatishvili and Sophie Gelovani	"Waterfall"	50	15
26	Ireland	Ryan Dolan	"Only Love Survives"	5	26

==== Spokespersons ====
Each participating broadcaster appointed a spokesperson who was responsible for announcing, in English or French, the votes for its respective country. The order in which each country announced their votes was determined in a draw following the jury results from final dress rehearsal. Similar to the 2012 contest an algorithm was used to generate as much suspense as possible. The spokespersons are shown alongside each country.

1. San Marino – John Kennedy O'Connor
2. Sweden – Yohio
3. Albania – Andri Xhahu
4. Netherlands – Cornald Maas
5. Austria – Kati Bellowitsch
6. United Kingdom – Scott Mills
7. Israel – Ofer Nachshon
8. Serbia – Maja Nikolić
9. Ukraine – Matias
10. Hungary – Éva Novodomszky
11. Romania – Sonia Argint
12. Moldova – Olivia Furtună
13. Azerbaijan – Tamilla Shirinova
14. Norway – Tooji
15. Armenia – André
16. Italy – Federica Gentile
17. Finland – Kristiina Wheeler
18. Spain – Inés Paz
19. Belarus – Darya Domracheva
20. Latvia – Anmary
21. Bulgaria – Joanna Dragneva
22. Belgium – Barbara Louys
23. Russia – Alsou
24. Malta – Emma Hickey
25. Estonia – Rolf Roosalu
26. Germany – Lena
27. Iceland – María Sigrún Hilmarsdóttir
28. France – Marine Vignes
29. Greece – Adriana Magania
30. Ireland – Nicky Byrne
31. Denmark – Sofie Lassen-Kahlke
32. Montenegro – Ivana Sebek
33. Slovenia – Andrea F
34. Georgia – Liza Tsiklauri
35. Macedonia – Dimitar Atanasovski
36. Cyprus – Loukas Hamatsos
37. Croatia – Uršula Tolj
38. Switzerland – Mélanie Freymond
39. Lithuania – Ignas Krupavičius

== Detailed voting results ==
The EBU published the split results of the semi-finals and final on 29 May 2013. Unlike in previous years, a full points breakdown of the jury and public voting was not revealed. Instead, an average ranking was provided for each country based on the votes of the juries and televote in isolation.

=== Semi-final 1 ===
Qualifiers

Split results of semi-final 1
Place	Combined		Jury		Televoting	
Place	Country	Points	Country	Avg. Rank	Country	Avg. Rank
1	Denmark	167	Denmark	3.58	Denmark	3.33
2	Russia	156	Russia	3.74	Russia	3.89
3	Ukraine	140	Moldova	4.32	Ukraine	3.94
4	Moldova	95	Ukraine	5.16	Montenegro	7.33
5	Belgium	75 (Note: Despite finishing with the same number of points as the Netherlands, Belgium is deemed to have finished in fifth place due to receiving points from a greater number of countries.)	Austria	6.32	Lithuania	7.44
6	Netherlands	75	Netherlands	6.42	Ireland	7.61
7	Belarus	64	Belgium	6.63	Belgium	7.72
8	Ireland	54	Estonia	7.47	Belarus	7.83
9	Lithuania	53	Belarus	8.26	Netherlands	7.94
10	Estonia	52	Ireland	9.26	Croatia	8.00
11	Serbia	46	Lithuania	9.37	Moldova	8.28
12	Montenegro	41	Cyprus	9.47	Serbia	8.39
13	Croatia	38	Croatia	9.95	Estonia	10.06
14	Austria	27	Montenegro	10.16	Cyprus	12.00
15	Cyprus	11	Serbia	10.95	Austria	12.33
16	Slovenia	8	Slovenia	11.47	Slovenia	13.17

Semi-final 1 voting results
		Total score	Austria	Estonia	Slovenia	Croatia	Denmark	Russia	Ukraine	Netherlands	Montenegro	Lithuania	Belarus	Moldova	Ireland	Cyprus	Belgium	Serbia	Italy	Sweden	United Kingdom
Contestants	Austria	27		1	1	4	4							3	4	2	3	2	2		1
Contestants	Estonia	52	3				1	5	1	4		4	5	5	8		1		5	6	4
Contestants	Slovenia	8				5					3										
Contestants	Croatia	38	5		2			4	6	3	5	1			1	1		10			
Contestants	Denmark	167	12	12	8	12		10	4	12	8	6	8	7	12	8	10	8	6	12	12
Contestants	Russia	156	10	10	10	8	12		7	7	7	10	10	8	10	10	7	6	4	10	10
Contestants	Ukraine	140	2	6	12	7	8	7		8	12	12	12	12	2	12	8	5	12	1	2
Contestants	Netherlands	75	8	7	3		10	3			2	7			5		12	1	1	8	8
Contestants	Montenegro	41				6	5		8				2	6				12		2	
Contestants	Lithuania	53		4			2	1	5				7	2	6	3	6		10		7
Contestants	Belarus	64			4			2	12	2	6	8		10	3	6		4	7		
Contestants	Moldova	95	7	3	7	1	6	12	10	6	4	3	6			5	5	7	8	5	
Contestants	Ireland	54		5		2	3	6	3	5		5	4	1		7	4			3	6
Contestants	Cyprus	11	1	2													2	3			3
Contestants	Belgium	75	4	8	6	3	7	8		10	1	2	3	4	7					7	5
Contestants	Serbia	46	6		5	10			2	1	10		1			4			3	4	

==== 12 points ====
Below is a summary of the maximum 12 points each country awarded to another in the first semi-final:

N.	Contestant	Nation(s) giving 12 points
7	Ukraine	Belarus, Cyprus, Italy, Lithuania, Moldova, Montenegro, Slovenia
7	Denmark	Austria, Croatia, Estonia, Ireland, Netherlands, Sweden, United Kingdom
1	Belarus	Ukraine
1	Moldova	Russia
1	Montenegro	Serbia
1	Netherlands	Belgium
1	Russia	Denmark

=== Semi-final 2 ===
Qualifiers

Split results of semi-final 2
Place	Combined		Jury		Televoting	
Place	Country	Points	Country	Avg. Rank	Country	Avg. Rank
1	Azerbaijan	139	Malta	3.40	Romania	4.78
2	Greece	121	Azerbaijan	4.60	Greece	5.00
3	Norway	120	Greece	5.55	Azerbaijan	5.28
4	Malta	118	Norway	5.80	Norway	5.50
5	Romania	83	Georgia	6.05	Switzerland	7.00
6	Iceland	72	Finland	7.05	Bulgaria	7.44
7	Armenia	69	Armenia	7.15	Malta	7.78
8	Hungary	66	Iceland	7.40	Hungary	8.39
9	Finland	64	Israel	7.95	Iceland	8.61
10	Georgia	63	San Marino	8.40	Finland	8.89
11	San Marino	47	Hungary	8.55	Armenia	9.44
12	Bulgaria	45	Albania	9.10	San Marino	9.47
13	Switzerland	41	Romania	9.70	Georgia	9.89
14	Israel	40	Macedonia	9.75	Israel	10.67
15	Albania	31	Latvia	9.90	Albania	11.78
16	Macedonia	28	Switzerland	10.65	Macedonia	12.22
17	Latvia	13	Bulgaria	10.75	Latvia	13.28

Semi-final 2 voting results
		Total score	Latvia	San Marino	Macedonia	Azerbaijan	Finland	Malta	Bulgaria	Iceland	Greece	Israel	Armenia	Hungary	Norway	Albania	Georgia	Switzerland	Romania	France	Germany	Spain
Contestants	Latvia	13			2					3							7	1				
Contestants	San Marino	47	3		5	1	1	6			1	4	4	2			1		4	5		10
Contestants	Macedonia	28		2				5	5							12		4				
Contestants	Azerbaijan	139	7	3	8		3	12	12	8	12	12		12	5	8	12	3	12	8		2
Contestants	Finland	64	8	7		3		1		7		1		5	8	1		2	3	7	3	8
Contestants	Malta	118	6	10	12	12	5			6	5	2	7	8	12	6	6	7	7	2	5	
Contestants	Bulgaria	45		8	3	4					2		10	1	1	4	4		1	1		6
Contestants	Iceland	72	10				12						1	10	10			10			12	7
Contestants	Greece	121	5	12	6	7	7	7	10	2		6	8	3	7	10	2	6	10		8	5
Contestants	Israel	40				6	2		4	1			6			3	5		2	4	4	3
Contestants	Armenia	69	1					8	8		7	8			4		10		5	12	6	
Contestants	Hungary	66	2	4			8		6			3			2	7	3	12	6	3	10	
Contestants	Norway	120	12	5	7	5	10	3	7	12	4	5	5	7			8	8	8		2	12
Contestants	Albania	31		6	10	2					8							5				
Contestants	Georgia	63	4	1	4	10		4	3	4	6	7	12	4								4
Contestants	Switzerland	41					6	2	1	5	3		2	6	3	2				10	1	
Contestants	Romania	83			1	8	4	10	2	10	10	10	3		6	5				6	7	1

==== 12 points ====
Below is a summary of the maximum 12 points each country awarded to another in the second semi-final:

N.	Contestant	Nation(s) giving 12 points
7	Azerbaijan	Bulgaria, Georgia, Greece, Hungary, Israel, Malta, Romania
3	Malta	Azerbaijan, Macedonia, Norway
3	Norway	Iceland, Latvia, Spain
2	Iceland	Finland, Germany
1	Armenia	France
1	Georgia	Armenia
1	Greece	San Marino
1	Hungary	Switzerland
1	Macedonia	Albania

=== Final ===
Winner

Split results of the final
Place	Combined		Jury		Televoting	
Place	Country	Points	Country	Avg. Rank	Country	Avg. Rank
1	Denmark	281	Denmark	6.23	Denmark	4.97
2	Azerbaijan	234	Azerbaijan	7.77	Ukraine	5.66
3	Ukraine	214	Sweden	8.05	Azerbaijan	5.86
4	Norway	191	Norway	8.23	Greece	6.00
5	Russia	174	Moldova	8.69	Russia	6.84
6	Greece	152	Ukraine	8.74	Norway	7.14
7	Italy	126	Netherlands	9.05	Romania	7.49
8	Malta	120	Italy	9.46	Hungary	8.19
9	Netherlands	114	Malta	9.54	Malta	10.97
10	Hungary	84	Russia	9.67	Italy	11.70
11	Moldova	71 (Note: Despite finishing with the same number of points as Belgium, Moldova is deemed to have finished in eleventh place due to receiving a greater individual score from one country, as both countries received points from the same number of national juries.)	Belgium	9.92	Netherlands	11.70
12	Belgium	71	France	10.95	Iceland	13.05
13	Romania	65	Georgia	12.10	Belarus	14.11
14	Sweden	62	Greece	12.28	Ireland	14.62
15	Georgia	50	United Kingdom	12.46	Armenia	15.11
16	Belarus	48	Estonia	13.41	Germany	15.81
17	Iceland	47	Iceland	13.44	Belgium	16.03
18	Armenia	41	Finland	13.77	Sweden	16.19
19	United Kingdom	23	Armenia	14.44	Moldova	16.57
20	Estonia	19	Germany	15.44	Finland	16.68
21	Germany	18	Hungary	15.59	Lithuania	16.73
22	Lithuania	17	Belarus	16.15	United Kingdom	17.03
23	France	14	Ireland	16.21	Georgia	17.08
24	Finland	13	Romania	17.82	Estonia	19.59
25	Spain	8	Lithuania	17.95	France	21.68
26	Ireland	5	Spain	19.64	Spain	22.92

Detailed voting results of the final
		Total score	San Marino	Sweden	Albania	Netherlands	Austria	United Kingdom	Israel	Serbia	Ukraine	Hungary	Romania	Moldova	Azerbaijan	Norway	Armenia	Italy	Finland	Spain	Belarus	Latvia	Bulgaria	Belgium	Russia	Malta	Estonia	Germany	Iceland	France	Greece	Ireland	Denmark	Montenegro	Slovenia	Georgia	Macedonia	Cyprus	Croatia	Switzerland	Lithuania
Contestants	France	14	8														2												2								1	1			
Contestants	Lithuania	17									1				3			6			5											1				1					
Contestants	Moldova	71					2		1	6	8		12		1			4		2	4		3	3	6					4		3		5			7				
Contestants	Finland	13	3						4																			1		3			2								
Contestants	Spain	8			6													2																							
Contestants	Belgium	71	5	7		12	3	3		3		4				3			3			2			8		2			5		4	5		2						
Contestants	Estonia	19																	6			10																			3
Contestants	Belarus	48							3		12			4	7		5									2					1			3		5	5				1
Contestants	Malta	120	10			8		7			2	8	5		8	10	6	10		1	7	5					5	5	5	2	3		4			3	3	3			
Contestants	Russia	174		5		4		10	7	8	4			7			7		2	6	8	12	5	4			12	2	1	6		10	7	7	10	6	6	5	6		7
Contestants	Germany	18			3		6		5											3																				1	
Contestants	Armenia	41	1								6	3		1							2		8		2	1				7						10					
Contestants	Netherlands	114		8	4		8	6				5	2			8			8					12	3		7		8			6	10		7		2		2	4	4
Contestants	Romania	65		4	5		4	4						10	6	6		1								7			6	1	10			1							
Contestants	United Kingdom	23		1									3							4						5						7			1					2	
Contestants	Sweden	62				3				1				5		12			4			4	4	1			1	3	4			5	8		6				1		
Contestants	Hungary	84	6	3	8	7				2						2		3	10				6				4	12			2								4	10	5
Contestants	Denmark	281		10	1	10	5	12	8	12	5	10	6	6	5	7	4	12	7	8	1	6	2	10	4	6	8	10	12	12	7	12		10	12	7	12	7	10	3	2
Contestants	Iceland	47		6				2				6				4			5								6	8					1		4					5	
Contestants	Azerbaijan	234	2		7	2	12		12	5	10	12	10	8						7	10	3	12	5	12	12		4	7	8	12	2		12	3	12		8	7	6	12
Contestants	Greece	152	12		10	1	7	8	2			1	7		4	5	8	7	1		6	1	7	2	10	4		6					6	8			4	12	5	8	
Contestants	Ukraine	214				5	1	5	10	10		7	4	12	12	1	12	5		10	12	7	10	8	1	10	10		3		8	8	3			8		10	12		10
Contestants	Italy	126	4		12		10			4			1				1			12				6		8				10	6			6	8	2	10	6	8	12	
Contestants	Norway	191	7	12	2	6			6	7	3	2	8	2	2		3	8	12	5	3	8	1	7	7	3	3	7	10		4		12	4	5	4	8	4	3	7	6
Contestants	Georgia	50									7			3	10		10								5						5			2							8
Contestants	Ireland	5		2				1																														2			

==== 12 points ====
Below is a summary of the maximum 12 points each country awarded to another in the final:

N.	Contestant	Nation(s) giving 12 points
10	Azerbaijan	Austria, Bulgaria, Georgia, Greece, Hungary, Israel, Lithuania, Malta, Montenegro, Russia
8	Denmark	France, Iceland, Ireland, Italy, Macedonia, Serbia, Slovenia, United Kingdom
5	Ukraine	Armenia, Azerbaijan, Belarus, Croatia, Moldova
3	Italy	Albania, Spain, Switzerland
3	Norway	Denmark, Finland, Sweden
2	Greece	Cyprus, San Marino
2	Russia	Estonia, Latvia
1	Belarus	Ukraine
1	Belgium	Netherlands
1	Hungary	Germany
1	Moldova	Romania
1	Netherlands	Belgium
1	Sweden	Norway

== Broadcasts ==
It was reported by the EBU that the 2013 contest was viewed by a worldwide television audience of 170 million viewers.

Broadcasters and commentators in participating countries
Country	Broadcaster	Channel(s)	Show(s)	Commentator(s)	Ref(s)
Armenia	AMPTV	Armenia 1	Semi-finals	André and Arevik Udumyan	
Armenia	AMPTV	Armenia 1	Final	Erik Antaranyan and Anna Avanesyan	
Austria	ORF	ORF eins	All shows	Andi Knoll	
Azerbaijan	İTV		All shows	Konul Arifgizi	
Belarus	BTRC	Belarus-1, Belarus 24	All shows	Evgeny Perlin	
Belgium	RTBF	La Une	All shows	Maureen Louys and Jean-Louis Lahaye	
Belgium	VRT	één, Radio 2	All shows	André Vermeulen and Tom De Cock	
Croatia	HRT	HRT 2	Semi-finals	Duško Ćurlić	
Croatia	HRT	HRT 1	Final	Duško Ćurlić	
Croatia	HRT	HR 2	SF1/Final	Robert Urlić	
Cyprus	CyBC	RIK 1, RIK Triton	All shows	Melina Karageorgiou	
Denmark	DR	DR1	All shows	Ole Tøpholm	
Estonia	ERR	ETV	All shows	Marko Reikop	
Estonia	ERR	Raadio 2	SF1/Final	Mart Juur and Andrus Kivirähk	
Finland	Yle	Yle TV2	All shows	Finnish: Aino Töllinen and Juuso Mäkilähde; Swedish: Eva Frantz and Johan Lindroos	
Finland	Yle	Yle Radio Suomi	All shows	Sanna Kojo and Jorma Hietamäki	
Finland	Yle	Yle Radio Vega	All shows	Eva Frantz and Johan Lindroos	
France	France Télévisions	France Ô	SF2	Audrey Chauveau and Bruno Berberes	
France	France Télévisions	France 3	Final	Cyril Féraud and Mireille Dumas	
Georgia	GPB	1TV	All shows	Temo Kvirkvelia	
Germany	ARD/NDR	Einsfestival, NDR Fernsehen	Semi-finals (Note: Germany provided a deferred broadcast of semi-final 2 on Einsfestival and of the semi-finals on NDR Fernsehen)	Peter Urban	
Germany	ARD/NDR	Phoenix	SF2	Peter Urban	
Germany	ARD/NDR	Das Erste	Final	Peter Urban	
Greece	ERT	NET	All shows	Maria Kozakou and Giorgos Kapoutzidis	
Greece	ERT	Proto Programma, Deftero Programma, Voice of Greece	All shows	Maria Kozakou and Giorgos Kapoutzidis	
Hungary	MTVA	M1	All shows	Gábor Gundel Takács	
Iceland	RÚV	RÚV, Rás 2	All shows	Felix Bergsson	
Ireland	RTÉ	RTÉ Two	Semi-finals	Marty Whelan	
Ireland	RTÉ	RTÉ One	Final	Marty Whelan	
Ireland	RTÉ	RTÉ Radio 1	SF1/Final	Shay Byrne and Zbyszek Zalinski	
Israel	IBA	Channel 1	All shows	No commentary; Hebrew subtitles	
Israel	IBA	Channel 33	All shows	No commentary; Arabic subtitles	
Israel	IBA	IBA 88FM	All shows	Kobi Menora	
Israel	IBA	IBA 88FM	SF1	Ofer Nachshon	
Israel	IBA	IBA 88FM	SF2	Amit Kotler and Yuval Caspin	
Israel	IBA	IBA 88FM	Final	Ron Levinthal, Kobi Oshrat and Yhaloma Bat Porat	
Italy	RAI	Rai 5	SF1	Federica Gentile	
Italy	RAI	Rai 2	Final	Filippo Solibello, Marco Ardemagni and Natascha Lusenti	
Latvia	LTV	LTV1	All shows	Valters Frīdenbergs	
Latvia	LTV	LTV1	Final	Kārlis Būmeisters	
Lithuania	LRT	LRT, LRT Radijas	All shows	Darius Užkuraitis	
Macedonia	MRT	MRT 1	All shows	Karolina Petkovska	
Malta	PBS	TVM	All shows	Gordon Bonello and Rodney Gauci	
Moldova	TRM	Moldova 1, Radio Moldova	All shows	Lidia Scarlat	
Montenegro	RTCG	TVCG 1, TVCG 2, (Note: TVCG 2 provided deferred broadcast of all shows) TVCG Sat	All shows	Dražen Bauković and Tamara Ivanković	
Montenegro	RTCG	Radio Crne Gore, Radio 98	All shows	Sonja Savović and Sanja Pejović	
Netherlands	TROS		Final	Jan Smit and Daniël Dekker	
Norway	NRK	NRK1	All shows	Olav Viksmo-Slettan	
Norway	NRK	NRK P3	Final	Ronny Brede Aase, Silje Nordnes and Yngve Hustad Reite	
Romania	TVR	TVR 1	All shows	Liana Stanciu	
Russia	Channel One Russia		All shows	Yana Churikova and Yuriy Aksyuta	
San Marino	SMRTV	SMtv San Marino	All shows	Lia Fiorio and Gigi Restivo	
Serbia	RTS	RTS1, RTS Sat	SF1	Duška Vučinić-Lučić	
Serbia	RTS	RTS1, RTS Sat	SF2	Dragoljub Ilić	
Serbia	RTS	RTS2, RTS Sat, RTS HD, RTS Digital	Final	Silvana Grujić	
Slovenia	RTVSLO	TV SLO 2	Semi-finals	Andrej Hofer	
Slovenia	RTVSLO	TV SLO 1	Final	Andrej Hofer	
Spain	RTVE	La 2	SF2	José María Íñigo	
Spain	RTVE	La 1	Final	José María Íñigo	
Sweden	SVT	SVT1	All shows	Josefine Sundström	
Sweden	SR	SR P4	All shows	Carolina Norén	
Sweden	SR	SR P4	Semi-finals	Ronnie Ritterland	
Sweden	SR	SR P4	Final	Björn Kjellman	
Switzerland	SRG SSR	SRF zwei	SF2	Sven Epiney	
Switzerland	SRG SSR	SRF 1	Final	Sven Epiney	
Switzerland	SRG SSR	RTS Deux	SF2/Final	Jean-Marc Richard and Nicolas Tanner	
Switzerland	SRG SSR	RSI La 2	SF2	Alessandro Bertoglio	
Switzerland	SRG SSR	RSI La 1	Final	Alessandro Bertoglio	
Ukraine	NTU	Pershyi Natsionalnyi	All shows	Timur Miroshnychenko and Tetyana Terekhova	
Ukraine	UR	UR-1	All shows	Olena Zelinchenko	
United Kingdom	BBC	BBC Three	Semi-finals	Scott Mills and Ana Matronic	
United Kingdom	BBC	BBC One	Final	Graham Norton	
United Kingdom	BBC	BBC Radio 2	Final	Ken Bruce	

Broadcasters and commentators in non-participating countries
Country	Broadcaster	Channel(s)	Show(s)	Commentator(s)	Ref(s)
Australia	SBS	SBS One	All shows	Julia Zemiro and Sam Pang	
Bosnia and Herzegovina	BHRT	BHT 1, BH Radio 1	All shows	Dejan Kukrić	
China	CCTV	CCTV-15	All shows (Note: Broadcast between 5 and 7 October 2013)	No commentary	
Kazakhstan	Khabar Agency	El Arna	All shows	Roman Raifeld and Kaldybek Zhaysanbay	
Portugal	RTP	RTP1	All shows (Note: Portugal provided deferred broadcast of the semi-finals)	Sílvia Alberto	
Slovakia	RTVS	Rádio FM	Final	Daniel Baláž and Pavol Hubinák	

== Incidents and controversies ==
=== Azerbaijan's vote rigging ===
Prior to the finals, the Lithuanian media outlet 15min released an undercover video suggesting that representatives from Azerbaijan were trying to bribe Lithuanians for votes in the televoting. The video detailed the plan, which involved recruiting groups of ten people each, and supplying them with SIM cards so they could vote multiple times during the voting window. It was also suggested that similar activity was taking place in a total of fifteen countries including Latvia, Estonia, Belarus, Ukraine, Croatia and Switzerland. In response to the allegations, Executive Supervisor Jon Ola Sand reaffirmed the contest's commitment to a "fair and transparent result". He stated that while Eurovision organisers were looking into the case, they "[emphasised] that the intention of these individuals have not yet been clarified, and nor has a link been established between the individuals in the video and the Azeri delegation, the Azeri act or the Azeri EBU member Ictimai TV." He added that, since 1998, when he was first involved with the contest, "every year there are rumors about irregularities in the voting".

The EBU later confirmed an attempt of cheating in the contest, which was unsuccessful according to EBU as the EBU's system prevents fraud. According to the EBU, there is no evidence that any broadcaster has been involved in cheating. The rules were changed the next year to ensure that all participating broadcasters would be responsible for preventing fraud to their advantage or face a three-year suspension if fraud is revealed. However, in May 2015, a member of the contest's Reference Group confirmed that Azerbaijan had cheated, and that it was organized and very expensive.

When Azerbaijan officially awarded no points to Dina Garipova of Russia, despite Garipova having reportedly come second in the country's phone poll, the Azerbaijani President Ilham Aliyev ordered an inquiry. The Russian Foreign Affairs Minister Sergei Lavrov claimed that the result had been falsified, and stated that "this outrageous action will not remain without a response". He promised a co-ordinated response with his Azerbaijani counterpart Elmar Mammadyarov. Simultaneously, the Belarusian President Alexander Lukashenko claimed that his own country having received no points from Russia showed that the result must have been falsified.

=== Plagiarism allegations ===
The entry for Germany, "Glorious" by Cascada, was the subject of investigation by NDR following allegations that it was too similar to the 2012 winner, "Euphoria" by Loreen. NDR spokeswoman Iris Bents played down the allegations, stating that "Every year there are attempts to create scandals around the Eurovision Song Contest and the participants." Following an independent audit, "Glorious" was found not to have plagiarized "Euphoria".

Allegations of plagiarism against the winning Danish entry "Only Teardrops" surfaced after Eric van Tijn, a notable Dutch music producer, mentioned the opening flute solo's similarity to "I Surrender", a 2002 song by the Dutch band K-Otic. However, Van Tijn also stated that the flute solo was the only similarity between the two songs, thus calling it "a storm in a teacup".

=== Finland's same-sex kiss ===
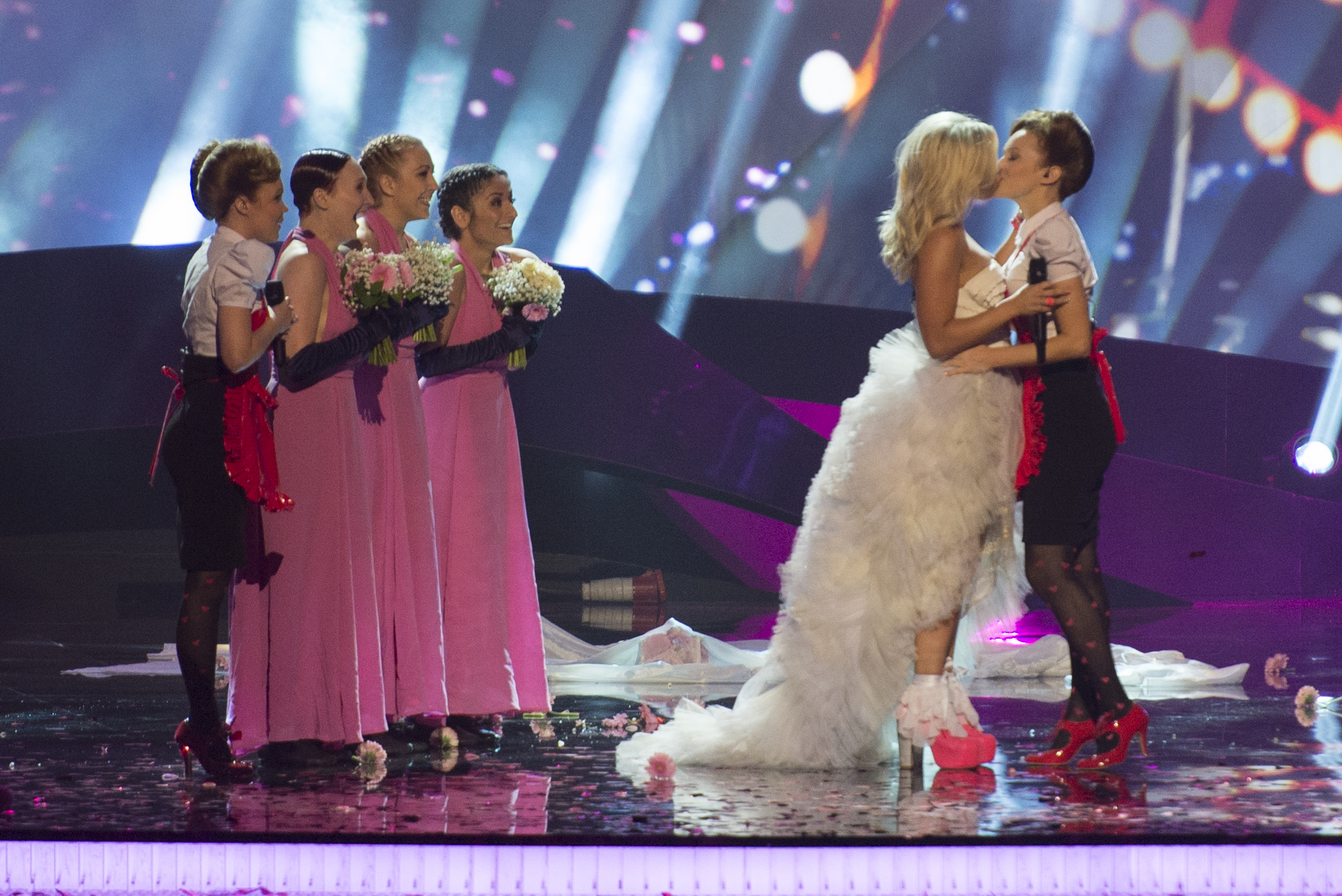
Finland's contestant Krista Siegfrids kissing one of her backing singers.

The performance of the Finnish entry, "Marry Me", caused controversy in some countries broadcasting the contest. The act featured Krista Siegfrids and one of her female backing singers kissing each other at the end, widely labelled in media as Eurovision's first "lesbian kiss". Siegfrids stated to the media that the act was done to encourage Finland to legalise same-sex marriage. It was reported that Turkish and Greek media reacted negatively to Siegfrids' act. According to Gay Star News, the Turkish broadcaster TRT, which had previously decided not to participate itself, initially indicated that it would still broadcast the contest, but made a late decision not to do so.

=== Eric Saade's green room incident ===
Green room host Eric Saade referred to Petra Mede as a "MILF" on air during the break between the first and second halves of the voting, saying "Back to you, Petra. #MILF". When the broadcaster for the United Kingdom, BBC aired this, the sound was lost. It remains unknown whether this was just an accident, or if the BBC did it purposely. While the statement was supposedly scripted and SVT were aware of Saade's plan, some on social media were confused and offended by the comment.

== Other awards ==
In addition to the main winner's trophy, the Marcel Bezençon Awards and the Barbara Dex Award were contested during the 2013 Eurovision Song Contest. The OGAE, "General Organisation of Eurovision Fans" voting poll also took place before the contest.

=== Marcel Bezençon Awards ===
The Marcel Bezençon Awards, organised since 2002 by Sweden's then-Head of Delegation and 1992 representative Christer Björkman, and 1984 winner Richard Herrey, honours songs in the contest's final. The awards are divided into three categories: Artistic Award, Composers Award, and Press Award.

Category	Country	Song	Artist	Songwriter(s)
Artistic Award	Azerbaijan	"Hold Me"	Farid Mammadov	Dimitris Kontopoulos; John Ballard; Ralph Charlie
Composers Award	Sweden	"You"	Robin Stjernberg	Robin Stjernberg; Linnea Deb; Joy Deb; Joakim Harestad Haukaas
Press Award	Georgia	"Waterfall"	Nodi Tatishvili and Sophie Gelovani	Thomas G:son

=== OGAE ===
OGAE, an organisation of over forty Eurovision Song Contest fan clubs across Europe and beyond, conducts an annual voting poll first held in 2002 as the Marcel Bezençon Fan Award. After all votes were cast, the top-ranked entry in the 2013 poll was also the winner of the contest, "Only Teardrops" performed by Emmelie de Forest; the top five results are shown below.

Country	Song	Artist	Points
Denmark	"Only Teardrops"	Emmelie de Forest	374
San Marino	"Crisalide (Vola)"	Valentina Monetta	282
Norway	"I Feed You My Love"	Margaret Berger	269
Germany	"Glorious"	Cascada	195
Italy	"L'essenziale"	Marco Mengoni	177

=== Barbara Dex Award ===
The Barbara Dex Award is a humorous fan award given to the worst dressed artist each year. Named after Belgium's representative who came last in the 1993 contest, wearing her self-designed dress, the award was handed by the fansite House of Eurovision from 1997 to 2016 and is being carried out by the fansite songfestival.be since 2017.

Country	Artist	Votes	Place
Serbia	Moje 3	967	1
Romania	Cezar	544	2
Israel	Moran Mazor	296	3
Albania	Adrian Lulgjuraj and Bledar Sejko	150	4
Montenegro	Who See	110	5

== Official album ==
Cover art of the official album

Eurovision Song Contest: Malmö 2013 was a compilation album put together by the EBU, and released by CMC International and Universal Music Group on 29 April 2013. The album featured all 39 songs that entered in the 2013 contest including the semi-finalists that failed to qualify into the grand final. The digital version featured a bonus track, "We Write the Story", composed by Björn Ulvaeus and Benny Andersson of ABBA, and DJ and music producer Avicii.

=== Charts ===
Chart (2013)	Peak position
Australian Albums (ARIA)	16
Austrian Albums (Ö3 Austria)	2
German Compilation Albums (Offizielle Top 100)	2
Dutch Compilation Albums (Compilation Top 30)	3
Swiss Albums (Schweizer Hitparade)	2
Norwegian Albums (VG-lista)	1

== See also ==
- ABU TV Song Festival 2013
- Eurovision Young Dancers 2013
- Junior Eurovision Song Contest 2013
- Türkvizyon Song Contest 2013
