= Pollapönk =

Icelandic band

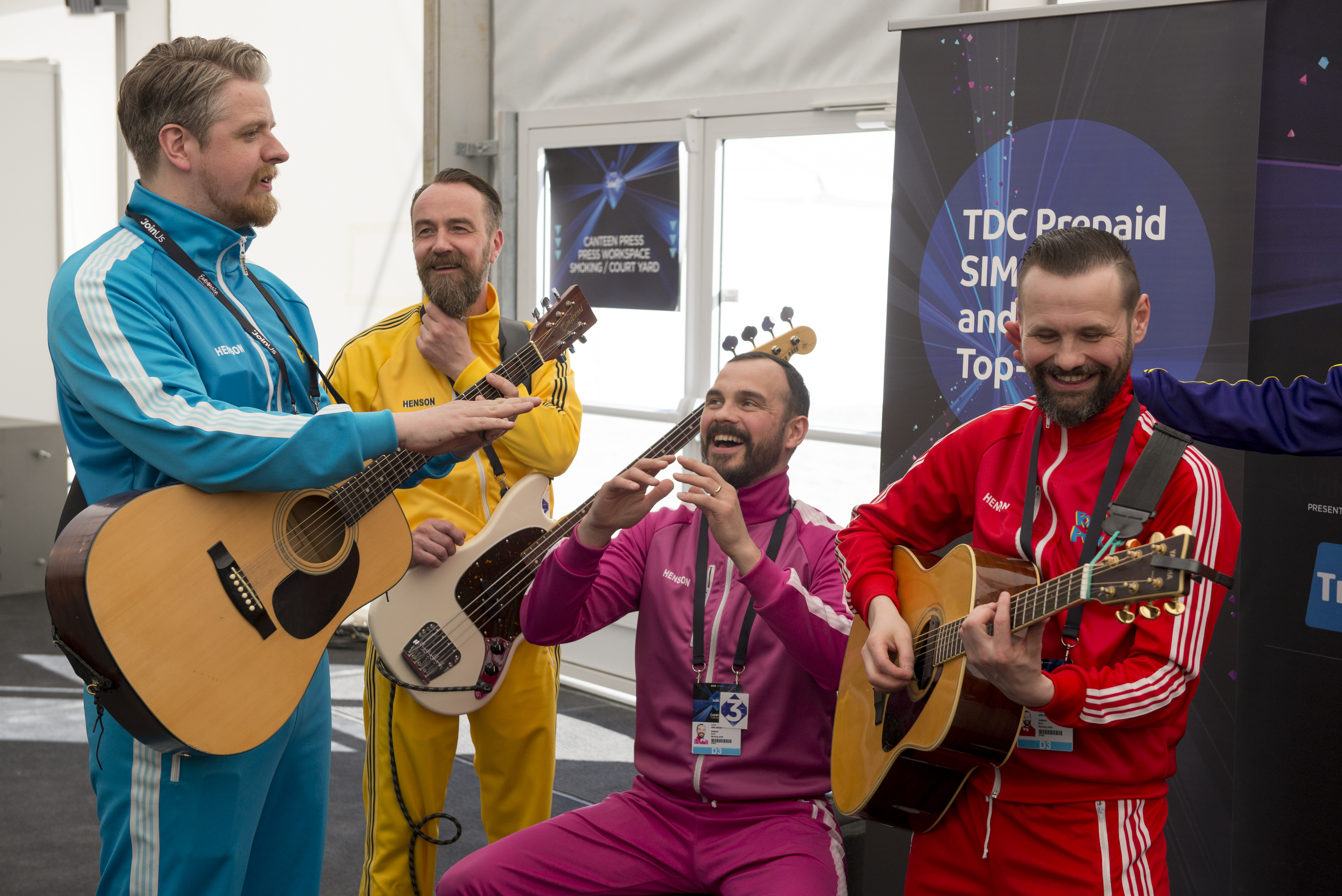
- Pollapönk (2014)

Background information
- Origin: Iceland
- Genres: Children's music; punk rock
- Years active: 2006–present
- Members: Heiðar Örn Kristjánsson; Haraldur Freyr Gíslason; Guðni Þórarinn Finnsson; Arnar Þór Gíslason

Pollapönk (Note: Meaning "punk for little kids" or "punk by small boys"; pronounced [ˈpʰɔlaˌpʰœyŋ̊k]) are an Icelandic punk-inflected children's music band which represented Iceland in the Eurovision Song Contest 2014 in Copenhagen, Denmark, with their song "No Prejudice".

== History ==
Pollapönk introducing themselves during the Eurovision Song Contest 2014

Pollapönk was founded in 2006 by singer Heiðar Örn Kristjánsson and lead guitarist Haraldur Freyr Gíslason, both of the rock band Botnleðja. The pair, who were studying to work as teachers, wanted to create music which could be enjoyed by both children and their broader families. Their debut album, the self-titled Pollapönk, was created as the duo's graduation project from the Iceland University of Education. The following year, Haraldur's brother Arnar Þór Gíslason and Guðni Finnsson joined the band, playing drums and bass guitar, respectively. The quartet released a second album, entitled Meira Pollapönk ("More Pollapönk") in 2010. This was followed in 2011 by Aðeins Meira Pollapönk ("A Little More Pollapönk").

In 2014, Pollapönk entered their song "Enga fordóma" in Söngvakeppnin 2014, the contest to select Iceland's entry in that year's Eurovision Song Contest, winning from 297 total entries. The song is a protest song on the evils of prejudice and bullying. This song was subsequently translated into English by American musician John Grant, under the title "No Prejudice", and was performed in this form for Eurovision. Pollapönk's entry reached the Grand Final, where it placed 15th among the 26 finalists.

== Members ==
- Heiðar Örn Kristjánsson (born September 7, 1974) is the blue polli (rascals), the lead singer of the band. Outside the band, Heiðar was previously the singer in Botnleðja and currently works as a preschool teacher and is married and has two children and two step-children.
- Haraldur Freyr Gíslason (born December 14, 1974) is the red polli, the band's lead guitarist. Haraldur was previously the drummer in Botnleðja. His brother, Arnar, is Pollapönk's drummer. Outside the band, Haraldur works as a preschool teacher and chairman of the Félag leikskólakennara (The Association of Teachers in Preschools), a branch of the Kennarasamband Íslands (The Icelandic Teachers' Union). He is married and has three children.
- Guðni Þórarinn Finnsson (born December 8, 1970) is the yellow polli, the band's bass guitarist. Outside the band, he is the bass guitarist for the bands Mugison and Ensími, with bandmate Arnar, and Dr. Spock, with Arnar and live member Óttarr Proppé. He is employed at Hljóðfærahúsið - Tónabúðin, a distributor of musical instruments. He is married and has three children.
- Arnar Þór Gíslason (born November 9, 1970) is the pink polli, Pollapönk's drummer, and Haraldur's brother. He is also the drummer in rock bands Ensími and Dr. Spock, alongside Guðni and Óttarr. When he first joined Pollapönk, Arnar performed as the green polli but, as the group found success, discovered this caused problems when recording green screen footage and transitioned to pink. He has spoken of being pleased at the normalising effect his color has had on boys wearing pink. Outside the band, he is employed at Hljóðfærahúsið - Tónabúðin and married. He has two children.

In live performances, the band has been joined by:

- Snæbjörn Ragnarsson (born 25 January 1978), as the orange polli, a backup singer. Snæbjörn is a member of the heavy metal band, Skálmöld. He has stated that he was initially hesitant to join a band performing at Eurovision but realised his attitude displayed the same prejudice the band's entry railed against and agreed.
- Óttarr Proppé (born November 7, 1968), as the purple polli, a backup singer. Óttarr was a member of Althing (Icelandic Parliament) and the rock band, Dr. Spock.

== Discography ==
=== Studio albums ===
Title	Album details
Pollapönk	Released: 2006; Format: Digital download, CD
Meira pollapönk	Released: 2010; Format: Digital download, CD
Aðeins meira pollapönk	Released: 2011; Format: Digital download, CD

=== Compilation albums ===
Title	Album details
Bebebe-besta pollapönkið	Released: 11 April 2014; Labels: Hands Up Music; Format: Digital download, CD

=== Singles ===
Title	Year	Peak chart positions			Album
Title	Year	ISL	AUT	UK	Album
"Ættarmót"	2011	24	—	—	Meira pollapönk
"Aðalsteinn (Enginn kemur að sækja mig)"					
"Ævintýraeyjan"					
"Enga fordóma / No Prejudice"	2014	1	68	70	Bebebe-besta pollapönkið
"Hananú"					
"Keyrða kynslóðin"					
"Leyniskápurinn"					
"Mannanafnalagid"					
"Pönkafinn"					
"Trix"					
"Vælubíllinn"					
"Tabula rasa"	2014	—	—	—	Non-album single(s)
"—" denotes a single that did not chart or was not released.

=== Music videos ===
Year	Title
2011	"Ættarmót"
2014	"Enga fordóma / No Prejudice"

== Notes ==
Awards and achievements
Preceded by Eyþór Ingi Gunnlaugsson with "Ég á líf"	Iceland in the Eurovision Song Contest; 2014	Succeeded by María Ólafsdóttir with "Unbroken"
