= Eyþór Ingi Gunnlaugsson =

Icelandic singer (born 1989)

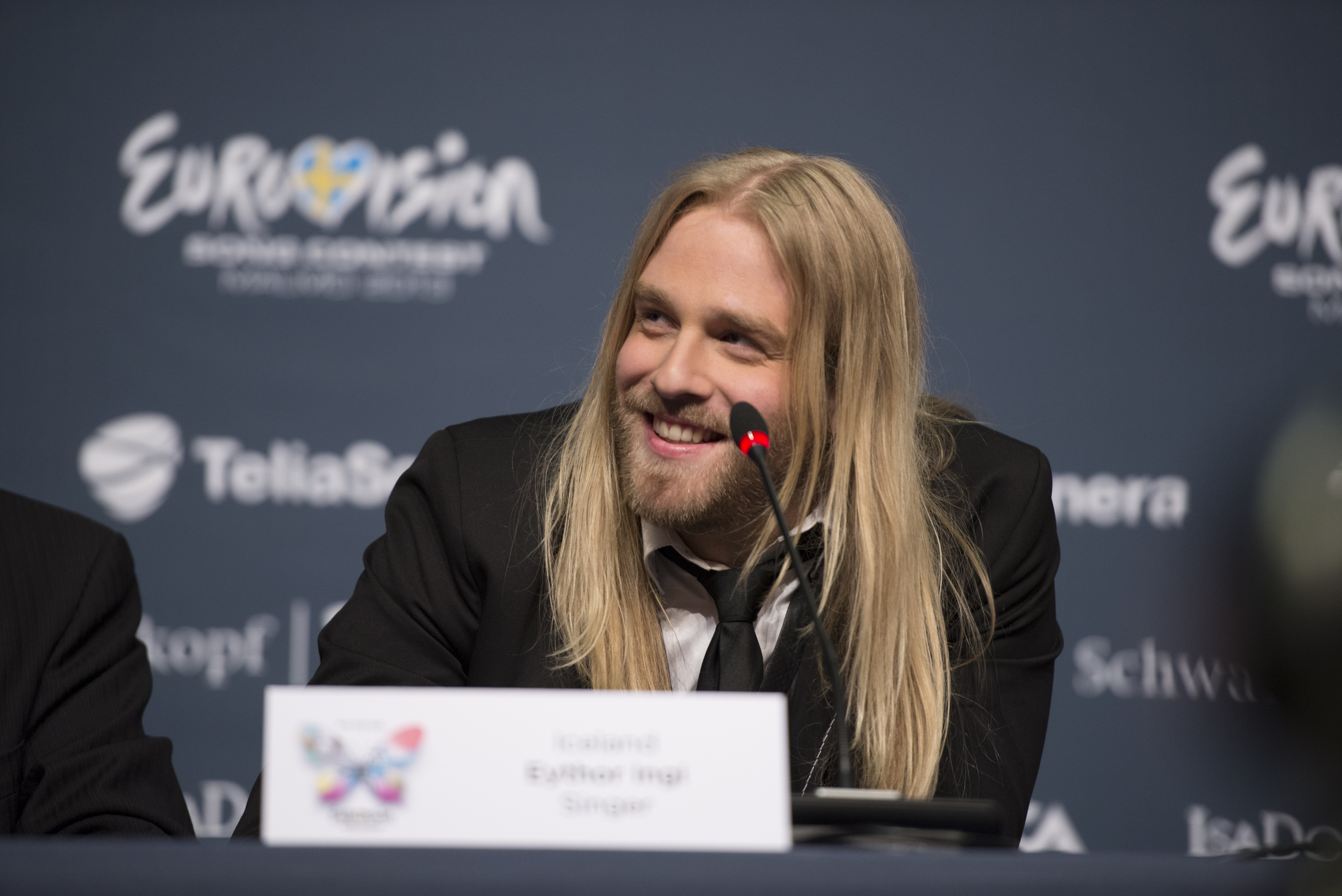
- Eyþór at the Eurovision Song Contest 2013

Background information
- Birth name: Eyþór Ingi Gunnlaugsson
- Also known as: Eythor Ingi
- Born: 29 May 1989 (age 35); Dalvík, Iceland
- Genres: Pop; rock; alternative
- Occupations: Singer; songwriter; producer; actor

Eyþór presenting himself at Eurovision Song Contest 2013.

Eyþór Ingi Gunnlaugsson (born 29 May 1989), transliterated/also known as Eythor Ingi, is an Icelandic singer, songwriter, producer, actor, and musician, known for the solo material bands Eldberg, Todmobile and Rock Paper Sisters. He represented Iceland in the Eurovision Song Contest 2013 in Malmö, Sweden with the song "Ég á líf".

== Life and career ==
At age 15, he played in the Icelandic version of the musical Oliver!, and in 2008 won the TV talent show Bandið hans Bubba. He had previously won a song contest for high school students in 2007 where he sang the Deep Purple song "Perfect Strangers". His musical influences are Jeff Buckley, The Beatles, Led Zeppelin and David Bowie.

He is the founder of the band Eldberg. In 2010, joined reactivated band Todmobile with which released the album 7. In 2011, he was nominated for Gríman theatrical Awards for his role as Riff Raff in The Rocky Horror Picture Show and a year later appeared in Les Misérables. In 2013, he won Söngvakeppnin 2013 and represent Iceland at the Eurovision Song Contest 2013 with the song "Ég á líf" where he placed 17th in the final. He, along with the band Atómskáldin, released the album Eyþór Ingi og Atómskáldin the same year.

He is the founder, lead vocalist, guitar player and one of the songwriters in Rock Paper Sisters. Their first single, "Howling Fool", was released in 2018. The band is one of many that has been founded in a party but one of few or maybe the only one that actually met, practiced, recorded and played live. Their first live show was at the stadium Laugardalshöll, opening up for Billy Idol. The band has released five singles, "Howling Fool", "Wings", "New Role", "Restless", and "Það á að gefa börnum brauð", a Christmas song based on an old Icelandic folk Christmas tune.

He has worked with various musicians from around the world including Steve Hackett from Genesis and Jon Anderson from Yes. Eyþór performed on Steve Hackett's solo album and has been a member of the Icelandic 80's progressive rock band Todmobile since 2009 as one of two lead singers. The band had been formed as a trio in the early 1990s around Þorvaldur Bjarni Þorvaldsson, a renowned vocalist, guitarist, and record producer in Iceland and throughout the years had seen many changes in line-up and revivals and comebacks. Eyþór Ingi took over singing duties from rocker Eyþór Arnalds.

In 2014, he became part of the voice cast for the Icelandic dub for the DreamWorks film How to Train Your Dragon 2.

== Personal life ==
In July 2013, Eyþór Ingi married his longtime girlfriend Soffía Ósk Guðmundsdóttir. They have two daughters named Elva Marín and Anna Carmen together, in addition to Soffía's two daughters from a previous relationship. The couple met in 2008.

His parents are Gunnlaugur Antonsson, a fisherman, and Guðbjörg Stefánsdóttir, a housewife and student. He has two younger sisters, Ellen Ýr and Elísa Rún. He lists his grandfathers Anton Gunnlaugsson and Stefán Friðgeirsson, who were also musicians, as musical influences. His first idol was Elvis Presley, and he recalls imitating him in bad English as a child. He is a fan of Deep Purple.

== Discography ==
=== Albums ===
- 2010: Eldberg (jointly with Eldberg)
- 2011: 7 (jointly with Todmobile)
- 2013: Eyþór Ingi og Atómskáldin (jointly with Atómskáldin)
- 2014: Úlfur (jointly with Todmobile)
- 2015: Þar er Heimur Hugans (jointly with Eldberg)
- 2016: Alfheims Edge (original soundtrack) (jointly with Matthías Stefánsson)
- 2016: Á Tónleikum í Tjarnarbíó (jointly with Eldberg)
- 2018: Hermaur (Best of Todmobile) (jointly with Todmobile)
- 2023: One In A Million (Rock Paper Sisters) (jointly with Rock Paper Sisters)

=== EPs ===
- 2012: Ég á líf: The Malmö Album
- 2023: Never Be Mine: Rock Paper Sisters

=== Singles ===
Title	Year	Peak chart positions				Album					
Title	Year	ICE	GER	NL	SWI	Album					
"Hjartað þitt"	2008	—	—	—	—	Non-album single(s)					
"Þá kem ég heim"	2011	—	—	—	—	Non-album single(s)					
"Desemberljóð"	2011	—	—	—	—	Non-album single(s)					
"Ég á líf"	2013	1	75	84	46	Ég á líf: The Malmö Album					
"Hárin rísa" (with Atómskáldin)	2015	—	—	—	—	Eyþór Ingi og Atómskáldin					
"Systir" (with Atómskáldin)	2016	—	—	—	—	Eyþór Ingi og Atómskáldin					
"Higher and Higher" (with Atómskáldin)	2016	—	—	—	—	Eyþór Ingi og Atómskáldin					
"If You Were Mine" (with Atómskáldin)	2017	—	—	—	—	Eyþór Ingi og Atómskáldin					
"Let There Be Light"	2018	—	—	—	—	Non-album single(s)					
"Færðu Mér Jólin Þín" (with Gunnar Þórðarsson)	2018	—	—	—	—	Non-album single(s)					
"Aftur Heim Til Þín" (with Lay Low)	2020	—	—	—	—	Non-album single(s)	Non-album single(s)	—	—	—	—
"Going To California" (with Þráinn Árni Baldursson from Skálmöld)	2020	2023	—	—	—	—	Non-album single(s)				

Special releases

- 2013: Ég á líf (Club Mix) (10-track single)

Awards and achievements
Preceded by Greta Salóme and Jónsi with "Never Forget"	Iceland in the Eurovision Song Contest; 2013	Succeeded by Pollapönk with "No Prejudice"
