= Germany in the Eurovision Song Contest 2013 =

- Eurovision Song Contest 2013
- Participating broadcaster: ARD (Note: Arbeitsgemeinschaft der öffentlich-rechtlichen Rundfunkanstalten der Bundesrepublik Deutschland) – Norddeutscher Rundfunk (NDR)
- Country: Germany
- Selection process: Unser Song für Malmö
- Selection date: 14 February 2013

Competing entry
- Song: "Glorious"
- Artist: Cascada
- Songwriters: Yann Peifer; Manuel Reuter; Andres Ballinas; Tony Cornelissen

Placement
- Final result: 21st, 18 points

Participation chronology

Germany was represented at the Eurovision Song Contest 2013 with the song "Glorious" written by Yann Peifer, Manuel Reuter, Andres Ballinas and Tony Cornelissen, and performed by Cascada. The German entry for the 2013 contest in Malmö, Sweden was selected through the national final Unser Song für Malmö, organised by the German broadcaster ARD in collaboration with Norddeutscher Rundfunk (NDR). The national final took place on 14 February 2013 and featured twelve competing acts with the winner by the votes of a five-member jury panel, a radio vote and a public televote. "Glorious" performed by Cascada was selected as the German entry for Malmö after gaining the most points following the combination of votes.

As a member of the "Big Five", Germany automatically qualified to compete in the final of the Eurovision Song Contest. Performing in position 11, Germany placed twenty-first out of the 26 participating countries with 18 points.

== Background ==
Prior to the 2013 contest, Germany had participated in the Eurovision Song Contest fifty-six times since its debut as one of seven countries to take part in 1956. Germany has won the contest on two occasions: in 1982 with the song "Ein bißchen Frieden" performed by Nicole and in 2010 with the song "Satellite" performed by Lena. Germany, to this point, has been noted for having competed in the contest more than any other country; they have competed in every contest since the first edition in 1956 except for the 1996 contest when the nation was eliminated in a pre-contest elimination round. In 2012, the German entry "Standing Still" performed by Roman Lob placed eighth out of twenty-six competing songs and scoring 110 points.

The German national broadcaster, ARD, broadcasts the event within Germany and delegates the selection of the nation's entry to the regional broadcaster Norddeutscher Rundfunk (NDR). NDR confirmed that Germany would participate in the 2016 Eurovision Song Contest on 27 May 2015. Since 2010, NDR had set up national finals in collaboration with private broadcaster ProSieben to choose either the song and performer or both to compete at Eurovision for Germany. On 22 November 2012, the broadcaster announced that they would not continue their collaboration with ProSieben but would still organise a multi-artist national final to select the German entry.

== Before Eurovision ==
=== Unser Song für Malmö ===
The logo of Unser Song für Malmö

Unser Song für Malmö (English: Our Song for Malmö) was the competition that selected Germany's entry for the Eurovision Song Contest 2013. The competition took place on 14 February 2013 at the TUI Arena in Hanover, hosted by Anke Engelke. Like in the previous three years, the national final was co-produced by the production company Brainpool, which also co-produced the Eurovision Song Contest 2011 in Düsseldorf and the Eurovision Song Contest 2012 in Baku. Twelve acts competed during the show with the winner being selected through a public televote. The show was broadcast on Das Erste as well as online via the broadcaster's Eurovision Song Contest website eurovision.de and the official Eurovision Song Contest website eurovision.tv. The national final was watched by 3.24 million viewers in Germany with a market share of 10.4%.

==== Competing entries ====
The twelve competing entries were selected by a seven-member panel consisting of Thomas Schreiber (ARD entertainment coordinator, head of the fiction and entertainment department for NDR), Jörg Grabosch (Brainpool managing director) as well as representatives of record companies Universal Music, Sony Music, Warner Music Entertainment, EMI and Embassy of Music. The first eleven participating acts were announced on 17 December 2012, while the twelfth act (Mia Diekow) was announced on 21 December 2012.

Artist	Song	Songwriter(s)
Ben Ivory	"The Righteous Ones"	Alexander Kronlund, Ali Payami, Ben Ivory
Betty Dittrich	"Lalala"	Betty Dittrich, Andreas John
Blitzkids mvt.	"Heart on the Line"	Malte Pittner, Svenja Malicha-Marx, Sarah Walker, Thorsten Peters
Cascada	"Glorious"	Yann Peifer, Manuel Reuter, Andres Ballinas, Tony Cornelissen
Die Priester feat. Mojca Erdmann	"Meerstern, sei gegrüßt"	from 11th/12th century, arranged by Michael Knauer
Finn Martin	"Change"	Finn Martin, Belle Humble, Marky Bates
LaBrassBanda	"Nackert"	Stefan Dettl, Manuel Winbeck, Manuel da Coll, Oliver Wrage, Andreas Hofmeir, Willy Löster, Olaf Opal
Mia Diekow	"Lieblingslied"	Mia Diekow, Philipp Schwär
Mobilée	"Little Sister"	Alexander Schroer
Nica and Joe	"Elevated"	David Jürgens, Alexander Komlew, Daniel Eisenlohr
Saint Lu	"Craving"	Saint Lu, Stefan Skarbek
Söhne Mannheims	"One Love"	Tino Oac, Michael Klimas, Andreas Bayless, Kosho, Ralf Gustke, Florian Sitzmann

==== Final ====
The televised final took place on 14 February 2013. The winner, "Glorious" performed by Cascada, was selected through a combination of votes from an expert jury (1/3), radio voting (1/3) and public televoting which included options for landline and SMS voting (1/3). The jury panel consisted of Tim Bendzko (singer-songwriter), Roman Lob (singer, German Eurovision entrant in 2012), Anna Loos (actress and singer), Mary Roos (singer, German Eurovision entrant in 1972 and 1984) and Peter Urban (radio host and German commentator for the Eurovision Song Contest). For the radio vote, listeners were able to vote online via the websites of the nine ARD radio channels between 7 and 14 February 2013. In addition to the performances of the competing entries, 2010 German Eurovision Song Contest winner Lena performed her new songs "Dynamite" and "Neon (Lonely People)", while 2012 Swedish Eurovision Song Contest winner Loreen performed her entry "Euphoria" and the song "My Heart Is Refusing Me". More than 837,000 televotes were cast during the show.

Final – 14 February 2013
R/O	Artist	Song	Jury	Public Vote		Total	Place
R/O	Artist	Song	Jury	Radio	Televote	Total	Place
1	Finn Martin	"Change"	6	3	3	12	9
2	Mobilée	"Little Sister"	3	5	0	8	11
3	Blitzkids mvt.	"Heart on the Line"	12	1	2	15	6
4	Betty Dittrich	"Lalala"	0	8	4	12	8
5	Ben Ivory	"The Righteous Ones"	7	6	0	13	7
6	Saint Lu	"Craving"	10	0	6	16	4
7	LaBrassBanda	"Nackert"	1	12	10	23	2
8	Nica and Joe	"Elevated"	4	4	8	16	5
9	Mia Diekow	"Lieblingslied"	2	0	1	3	12
10	Söhne Mannheims	"One Love"	5	7	5	17	3
11	Die Priester feat. Mojca Erdmann	"Meerstern, sei gegrüßt"	0	2	7	9	10
12	Cascada	"Glorious"	8	10	12	30	1

Detailed Radio Voting Results
R/O	Song	hr3 (HR)	MDR Jump (MDR)	B3 (BR)	NDR2 (NDR)	BV (RB)	Fritz (RBB)	SR1 (SR)	SWR3 (SWR)	1LIVE (WDR)	Total	Points
1	"Change"	3	3	3	4	4	3	4	3	3	30	3
2	"Little Sister"	4	5	6	3	5	5	5	5	7	45	5
3	"Heart on the Line"			1		2	2	1	1		8	1
4	"Lalala"	7	8	8	10	8	8	8	8	6	71	8
5	"The Righteous Ones"	6	6	5	5	6	6	6	6	5	51	6
6	"Craving"									2	2	0
7	"Nackert"	12	12	12	12	12	12	12	12	12	108	12
8	"Elevated"	5	4	4	6	3	4	3	4	4	37	4
9	"Lieblingslied"	1	1		1	1	1			1	6	0
10	"One Love"	10	7	7	7	7	7	7	7	8	67	7
11	"Meerstern, sei gegrüßt"	2	2	2	2			2	2		12	2
12	"Glorious"	8	10	10	8	10	10	10	10	10	86	10
Radio voting spokespersons
hr3 – Tim Frühling; MDR Jump – Lars-Christian Karde; Bremen Vier – Lea Finn; SR 1 Europawelle – Holger Büchner; SWR3 – Frederik Peters; Bayern 3 – Sebastian Winkler; Fritz – Chris Guse; NDR 2 – Ilka Petersen; 1LIVE – Sabine Heinrich

=== Controversy ===
Following Cascada's victory at the German national final, "Glorious" came under investigation by NDR following allegations that the song was a copy of the Eurovision Song Contest 2012 winning song "Euphoria" by Loreen. On 19 February, NDR spokeswoman Iris Bents reported that the results of the study would be published when they were available but played down the allegations, stating that "every year there are attempts to create scandals around the Eurovision Song Contest and the participants". On 25 February, it was announced that "Glorious" was cleared of plagiarism and would remain as the German entry for the 2013 Eurovision Song Contest.

== At Eurovision ==
According to Eurovision rules, all nations with the exceptions of the host country and the "Big Five" (France, Germany, Italy, Spain and the United Kingdom) are required to qualify from one of two semi-finals in order to compete for the final; the top ten countries from each semi-final progress to the final. As a member of the "Big 5", Germany automatically qualified to compete in the final on 18 May 2013. In addition to their participation in the final, Germany is also required to broadcast and vote in one of the two semi-finals. This was decided via a draw held during the semi-final allocation draw on 17 January 2013, and Germany was assigned to broadcast and vote in the second semi-final on 16 May 2013.

In Germany, the first semi-final was broadcast on EinsFestival and on delay on NDR Fernsehen, the second semi-final was broadcast on Phoenix and on delay on EinsFestival and NDR Fernsehen, and the final was broadcast on Das Erste. All broadcasts featured commentary by Peter Urban. The final was watched by 8.2 million viewers in Germany, which meant a market share of 33.8 per cent. The German spokesperson, who announced the top 12-point score awarded by the German vote during the final, was 2010 contest winner Lena.

=== Final ===
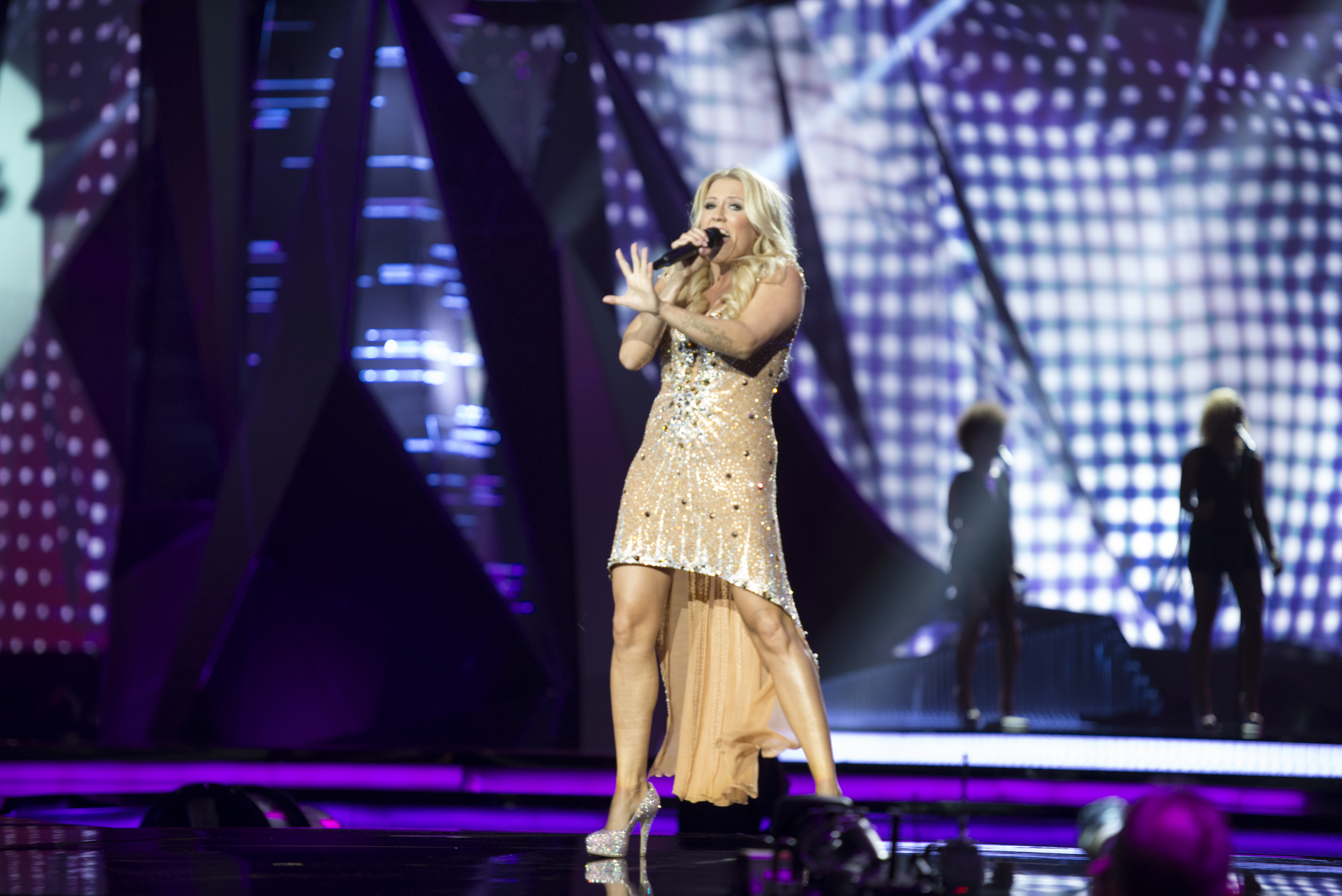
Cascada at rehearsal in Malmö.

During the German delegation's press conference on 15 May 2013, Cascada took part in a draw to determine in which half of the final the German entry would be performed. Germany was drawn to compete in the first half. Following the conclusion of the second semi-final, the shows' producers decided upon the running order of the final. The running order for the semi-finals and final was decided by the shows' producers rather than through another draw, so that similar songs were not placed next to each other. Germany was subsequently placed to perform in position 11, following the entry from Russia and before the entry from Armenia.

The German performance featured the lead singer of Cascada Natalie Horler performing on stage wearing a champagne beige glittered dress designed by Katja Convents. The performance also featured a glass staircase which Horler stood at the beginning, as well as flames and shots during the first chorus and a pyrotechnic waterfall effect during the last chorus. The two backing vocalists that joined Horler on stage were Elli Azuro and Rayla Sunshine. Although the song was widely tipped to do well, being the second favourite to win with the British Bookmakers and also being number 6 in Austrian Airplay and number 21 in British Airplay in the week leading up to the contest, Germany placed twenty-first in the final, scoring 18 points.

=== Voting ===
Voting during the three shows involved each country awarding points from 1–8, 10 and 12 based on the results of their professional jury and televoting. Each nation's jury consisted of five music industry professionals who are citizens of the country they represent, with their names published before the contest to ensure transparency. This jury judged each entry based on: vocal capacity; the stage performance; the song's composition and originality; and the overall impression by the act. In addition, no member of a national jury was permitted to be related in any way to any of the competing acts in such a way that they cannot vote impartially and independently. The members that comprised the German jury were Lena, Tim Bendzko (singer-songwriter), Alina Süggeler (singer), Carolin Niemczyk (singer) and Florian Silbereisen (singer and television presenter).

Below is a breakdown of points awarded to Germany and awarded by Germany in the second semi-final and grand final of the contest:

==== Points awarded to Germany ====
Points awarded to Germany (Final)
Score	Country
12 points	
10 points	
8 points	
7 points	
6 points	Austria
5 points	Israel
4 points	
3 points	Albania; Spain
2 points	
1 point	Switzerland

==== Points awarded by Germany ====
Points awarded by Germany (Semi-final 2)
Score	Country
12 points	Iceland
10 points	Hungary
8 points	Greece
7 points	Romania
6 points	Armenia
5 points	Malta
4 points	Israel
3 points	Finland
2 points	Norway
1 point	Switzerland

Points awarded by Germany (Final)
Score	Country
12 points	Hungary
10 points	Denmark
8 points	Iceland
7 points	Norway
6 points	Greece
5 points	Malta
4 points	Azerbaijan
3 points	Sweden
2 points	Russia
1 point	Finland

===== Jury rankings by Germany =====
Jury ranking by Germany (Semi-final 2)
Rank	Country
1	Israel
2	Hungary
3	Iceland
4	Armenia
5	Greece
6	Finland
7	Azerbaijan
8	Romania
9	Malta
10	Latvia
11	Georgia
12	Norway
13	Macedonia
14	San Marino
15	Albania
16	Switzerland
17	Bulgaria

Jury ranking by Germany (Final)
Rank	Country
1	Sweden
2	Hungary
3	Norway
4	Iceland
5	Denmark
6	Finland
7	Belgium
8	Azerbaijan
9	Armenia
10	Malta
11	Greece
12	Romania
13	Italy
14	Georgia
15	Estonia
16	Russia
17	United Kingdom
18	France
19	Netherlands
20	Moldova
21	Ireland
22	Ukraine
23	Spain
24	Belarus
25	Lithuania
