= IsaDora cosmetics =

Swedish Cosmetic Brand

- Type: Private
- Industry: Consumer goods
- Founded: 1983
- Headquarters: Malmö, Sweden
- Key people: Anne Marie Tromholt Qvist (CEO)
- Products: Cosmetics
- Website: isadora.com

IsaDora cosmetics is a Swedish cosmetics brand established in 1983, located in Malmö. IsaDora's first beauty line debuted in Swedish stores in November 1983, and by 1984, IsaDora exported its products to Norway and the rest of Scandinavia. IsaDora expanded into the US market in 2017 and was sold in Walgreens stores.

== History ==
IsaDora cosmetics was founded in Malmö, Sweden by Ingvar Vigstrand in 1983.

It was one of the sponsors and partners of the Eurovision Song Contest 2013. IsaDora also hosted their own Eurovision event with appearances from the participants of the contest.

In May 2013, IsaDora cosmetics launched its products in the UAE.

Isadora's products are not tested on animals.

In 2021, IsaDora cosmetics announced that Una Healy would be the new face of the company.

Anne Marie Tromholt Qvist was named CEO in March 2025.
