= Iceland in the Eurovision Song Contest 2013 =

- Eurovision Song Contest 2013
- Participating broadcaster: Ríkisútvarpið (RÚV)
- Country: Iceland
- Selection process: Söngvakeppnin 2013
- Selection date: 2 February 2013

Competing entry
- Song: "Ég á líf"
- Artist: Eythor Ingi
- Songwriters: Örlygur Smári; Pétur Örn Gudmundsson

Placement
- Semi-final result: Qualified (6th, 72 points)
- Final result: 17th, 47 points

Participation chronology

Iceland was represented at the Eurovision Song Contest 2013 with the song "Ég á líf" written by Örlygur Smári, Pétur Örn Guðmundsson. The song was performed by Eythor Ingi. The Icelandic entry for the 2013 contest in Malmö, Sweden was selected through the national final Söngvakeppnin 2013, organised by the Icelandic broadcaster Ríkisútvarpið (RÚV). The selection consisted of two semi-finals and a final, held on 25 January, 26 January and 2 February 2013, respectively. Six songs competed in each semi-final with the top three as selected by a public televote alongside a jury wildcard advancing to the final. In the final, the winner was selected over two rounds of voting: the first involved a 50/50 combination of jury voting and public televoting, which reduced the seven competing entries to two superfinalists and the second round selected the winner exclusively through public televoting. "Ég á líf" performed by Eythor Ingi emerged as the winner after gaining 67% of the public vote.

Iceland was drawn to compete in the second semi-final of the Eurovision Song Contest which took place on 16 May 2013. Performing during the show in position 8, "Ég á líf" was announced among the top 10 entries of the second semi-final and therefore qualified to compete in the final on 18 May. It was later revealed that the Iceland placed sixth out of the 17 participating countries in the semi-final with 72 points. In the final, Iceland performed in position 19 and placed seventeenth out of the 26 participating countries, scoring 47 points.

== Background ==
Prior to the 2013 contest, Iceland had participated in the Eurovision Song Contest twenty-five times since its first entry in 1986. Iceland's best placing in the contest to this point was second, which it achieved on two occasions: in 1999 with the song "All Out of Luck" performed by Selma and in 2009 with the song "Is It True?" performed by Yohanna. Since the introduction of a semi-final to the format of the Eurovision Song Contest in 2004, Iceland has, to this point, only failed to qualify to the final three times. In 2012, Iceland managed to qualify to the final and placed twentieth with the song "Never Forget" performed by Greta Salóme and Jónsi.

The Icelandic national broadcaster, Ríkisútvarpið (RÚV), broadcasts the event within Iceland and organises the selection process for the nation's entry. RÚV confirmed their intentions to participate at the 2013 Eurovision Song Contest on 11 September 2012. Since 2006, Iceland has used a national final to select their entry for the Eurovision Song Contest, a method that continued for their 2013 participation.

== Before Eurovision ==
=== Söngvakeppnin 2013 ===
Söngvakeppnin 2013 was the national final format developed by RÚV in order to select Iceland's entry for the Eurovision Song Contest 2013. The three shows in the competition were hosted by Guðrún Dís Emilsdóttir and Þórhallur Gunnarsson and all took place in Reykjavík: the two semi-finals were held at the RÚV studios and the final took place at the Harpa venue. The semi-finals and final were broadcast on RÚV and online at the broadcaster's official website ruv.is. The final was also broadcast via radio on Rás 2 and streamed online at the Eurovision Song Contest official website eurovision.tv.

==== Format ====
Twelve songs in total competed in Söngvakeppnin 2013 where the winner was determined after two semi-finals and a final. Five songs competed in each semi-final on 25 and 26 January 2013. The top three songs from each semi-final, as determined by public televoting qualified to the final which took place on 2 February 2013. A wildcard act was selected by a jury for the final out of the remaining non-qualifying acts from both semi-finals. The winning entry in the final was determined over two rounds of voting: the first to select the top two via 50/50 public televoting and jury voting and the second to determine the winner with 100% televoting. All songs were required to be performed in Icelandic during all portions of the competition, however, it will be up to the winning composers to decide the language that will be performed at the Eurovision Song Contest in Malmö.

==== Competing entries ====
On 11 September 2012, RÚV opened the submission period for interested songwriters to submit their entries until the deadline on 8 October 2012. Songwriters were required to be Icelandic or possess Icelandic citizenship and had the right to submit up to three entries. However, exceptions would be made for minor collaborations with foreign songwriters as long as two-thirds of the composition and half of the lyrics are by Icelandic composers/lyricists. At the close of the submission deadline, 240 entries were received. A selection committee was formed in order to select the top twelve entries. The twelve competing songs were revealed by the broadcaster during a press conference on 12 November 2012, while their artists were revealed on 10 January 2013. Among the competing artists were previous Icelandic Eurovision entrant Birgitta Haukdal, who represented Iceland in 2003, and Jóhanna Guðrún Jónsdóttir, who represented Iceland in 2009. RÚV presented the songs between 14 and 16 January 2013 during the Rás 2 radio programmes Morgunútvarpið, Virkum morgnum, Poppland and Síðdegisútvarpið.

| Artist | Song | Songwriter(s) |
|---|---|---|
| Birgitta Haukdal | "Meðal andanna" | Birgitta Haukdal, Sylvía Haukdal Brynjarsdóttir, Jonas Gladnikoff, Michael James Down, Primož Poglajen |
| Edda Viðarsdóttir | "Sá sem lætur hjartað ráða för" | Þórir Úlfarsson, Kristján Hreinsson |
| Erna Hrönn Ólafsdóttir | "Augnablik" | Sveinn Rúnar Sigurðsson, Ingibjörg Gunnarsdóttir |
| Eyþór Ingi Gunnlaugsson | "Ég á líf" | Örlygur Smári, Pétur Örn Guðmundsson |
| Haraldur Reynisson | "Vinátta" | Haraldur Reynisson |
| Jógvan Hansen and Stefanía Svavarsdóttir | "Til þín" | Sveinn Rúnar Sigurðsson, Ágúst Ibsen |
| Jóhanna Guðrún Jónsdóttir | "Þú" | Davíð Sigurgeirsson |
| Klara Ósk Elíasdóttir | "Skuggamynd" | Hallgrímur Óskarsson, Ashley Hicklin, Bragi Valdimar Skúlason |
| Magni Ásgeirsson | "Ekki líta undan" | Sveinn Rúnar Sigurðsson, Ingibjörg Gunnarsdóttir |
| Svavar Knútur Kristinsson and Hreindís Ylva Garðarsdóttir Hólm | "Lífið snýst" | Hallgrímur Óskarsson, Svavar Knútur Kristinsson |
| Sylvía Erla Scheving | "Stund með þér" | María Björk Sverrisdóttir |
| Unnur Eggertsdóttir | "Ég syng!" | Elíza Newman, Gísli Kristjánsson, Ken Rose, Hulda G. Geirsdóttir |

==== Semi-finals ====
The two semi-finals took place on 25 and 26 January 2013. In each semi-final six acts presented their entries, and the top three entries voted upon solely by public televoting proceeded to the final. "Ekki líta undan" performed by Magni Ásgeirsson was awarded the jury wildcard and also proceeded to the final.

The shows also featured guest performances by Blár Ópal in the first semi-final and White Signal in the second semi-final. Blár Ópal covered the debut 1986 Icelandic Eurovision entry "Gleðibankinn", while White Signal covered the 1999 Icelandic Eurovision entry "All Out of Luck".

Semi-final 1 – 25 January 2013
| R/O | Artist | Song | Result |
|---|---|---|---|
| 1 | Yohanna | "Þú" | —N/a |
| 2 | Magni Ásgeirsson | "Ekki líta undan" | Wildcard |
| 3 | Svavar Knútur Kristinsson and Hreindís Ylva Garðarsdóttir Hólm | "Lífið snýst" | Advanced |
| 4 | Edda Viðarsdóttir | "Sá sem lætur hjartað ráða för" | —N/a |
| 5 | Eyþór Ingi Gunnlaugsson | "Ég á líf" | Advanced |
| 6 | Birgitta Haukdal | "Meðal andanna" | Advanced |

Semi-final 2 – 26 January 2013
| R/O | Artist | Song | Result |
|---|---|---|---|
| 1 | Klara Ósk Elíasdóttir | "Skuggamynd" | —N/a |
| 2 | Jógvan Hansen and Stefanía Svavarsdóttir | "Til þín" | Advanced |
| 3 | Sylvía Erla Scheving | "Stund með þér" | —N/a |
| 4 | Haraldur Reynisson | "Vinátta" | Advanced |
| 5 | Unnur Eggertsdóttir | "Ég syng!" | Advanced |
| 6 | Erna Hrönn Ólafsdóttir | "Augnablik" | —N/a |

==== Final ====
The final took place on 2 February 2013 where the seven entries that qualified from the preceding two semi-finals competed. In the first round of voting, votes from a jury panel (50%) and public televoting (50%) determined the top two entries. The top two entries advanced to a second round of voting, the superfinal, where the winner, "Ég á líf" performed by Eyþór Ingi Gunnlaugsson, was determined solely by televoting. "Ég á líf" also won the public televote in the first round with 1/3 of the votes. In addition to the performances of the competing artists, the show was opened by 2012 Icelandic Eurovision entrant Greta Salóme, while the interval acts featured guest performances by 1999 and 2005 Icelandic Eurovision entrant Selma, and 2008 Icelandic Eurovision entrant Euroband.

Final – 2 February 2013
| R/O | Artist | Song | Result |
|---|---|---|---|
| 1 | Magni Ásgeirsson | "Ekki líta undan" | —N/a |
| 2 | Svavar Knútur Kristinsson and Hreindís Ylva Garðarsdóttir Hólm | "Lífið snýst" | —N/a |
| 3 | Eyþór Ingi Gunnlaugsson | "Ég á líf" | Advanced |
| 4 | Birgitta Haukdal | "Meðal andanna" | —N/a |
| 5 | Jógvan Hansen and Stefanía Svavarsdóttir | "Til þín" | —N/a |
| 6 | Haraldur Reynisson | "Vinátta" | —N/a |
| 7 | Unnur Eggertsdóttir | "Ég syng!" | Advanced |

Superfinal – 2 February 2013
| R/O | Artist | Song | Televote | Place |
|---|---|---|---|---|
| 1 | Eyþór Ingi Gunnlaugsson | "Ég á líf" | 67% | 1 |
| 2 | Unnur Eggertsdóttir | "Ég syng!" | 33% | 2 |

=== Preparation ===
In early March 2013, Eythor Ingi filmed the official music video for "Ég á líf" at the Barónsstíg venue in Reykjavík and at the Icelandic oceans. The video, directed by Guðmundur Þór Kárason with graphics by Tómas Ingi Ragnarsson, was presented to the public on 15 March 2013 during a press conference held at the Vodafone Iceland Headquarters in Reykjavík. During the press conference, it was announced that "Ég á líf" would be performed in Icelandic at the Eurovision Song Contest.

== At Eurovision ==
Eythor Ingi presenting himself and the song he competed with at the Eurovision Song Contest 2013

According to Eurovision rules, all nations with the exceptions of the host country and the "Big Five" (France, Germany, Italy, Spain and the United Kingdom) are required to qualify from one of two semi-finals in order to compete for the final; the top ten countries from each semi-final progress to the final. The European Broadcasting Union (EBU) split up the competing countries into six different pots based on voting patterns from previous contests, with countries with favourable voting histories put into the same pot. On 17 January 2013, a special allocation draw was held which placed each country into one of the two semi-finals, as well as which half of the show they would perform in. Iceland was placed into the second semi-final, to be held on 16 May 2013, and was scheduled to perform in the first half of the show.

Once all the competing songs for the 2013 contest had been released, the running order for the semi-finals was decided by the shows' producers rather than through another draw, so that similar songs were not placed next to each other. Iceland was set to perform in position 8, following the entry from Bulgaria and before the entry from Greece.

The two semi-finals and the final were broadcast in Iceland on RÚV and Rás 2 with commentary by Felix Bergsson. The Icelandic spokesperson, who announced the Icelandic votes during the final, was María Sigrún Hilmarsdóttir.

=== Semi-final ===
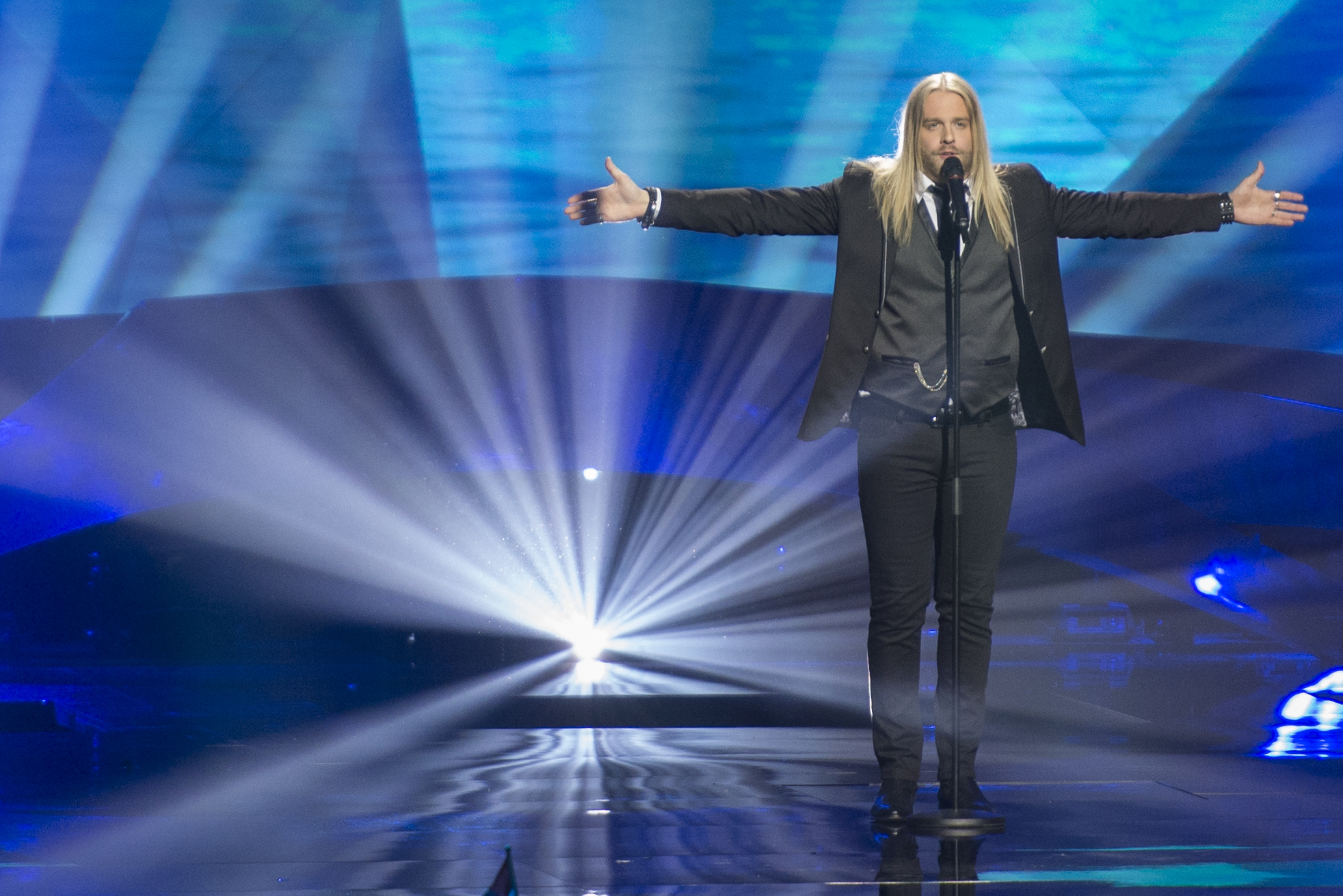
Eythor Ingi during a rehearsal before the second semi-final

Eythor Ingi took part in technical rehearsals on 8 and 11 May, followed by dress rehearsals on 15 and 16 May. This included the jury show on 15 May where the professional juries of each country watched and voted on the competing entries.

The Icelandic performance featured Eythor Ingi dressed in a black outfit, joined on stage by four backing vocalists at the end of the performance. The stage colours were blue and the LED screens displayed images of Iceland which included the sea, houses and lighthouses. The backing vocalists that joined Eythor Ingi were: Bergþór Smári Jakobsson, Einar Þór Jóhannsson, Hannes Heimir Friðbjarnarson and Kristján Gíslason. Kristján Gíslason previously represented Iceland in 2001 as part of Two Tricky.

At the end of the show, Iceland was announced as having finished in the top 10 and subsequently qualifying for the grand final. It was later revealed that Iceland placed sixth in the semi-final, receiving a total of 72 points.

=== Final ===
Shortly after the second semi-final, a winners' press conference was held for the ten qualifying countries. As part of this press conference, the qualifying artists took part in a draw to determine which half of the grand final they would subsequently participate in. This draw was done in the order the countries appeared in the semi-final running order. Iceland was drawn to compete in the second half. Following this draw, the shows' producers decided upon the running order of the final, as they had done for the semi-finals. Iceland was subsequently placed to perform in position 19, following the entry from Denmark and before the entry from Azerbaijan.

Eythor Ingi once again took part in dress rehearsals on 17 and 18 May before the final, including the jury final where the professional juries cast their final votes before the live show. Eythor Ingi performed a repeat of his semi-final performance during the final on 18 May. At the conclusion of the voting, Iceland finished in seventeenth place with 47 points.

=== Voting ===
Voting during the three shows consisted of 50 percent public televoting and 50 percent from a jury deliberation. The jury consisted of five music industry professionals who were citizens of the country they represent. This jury was asked to judge each contestant based on: vocal capacity; the stage performance; the song's composition and originality; and the overall impression by the act. In addition, no member of a national jury could be related in any way to any of the competing acts in such a way that they cannot vote impartially and independently.

Following the release of the full split voting by the EBU after the conclusion of the competition, it was revealed that Iceland had placed twelfth with the public televote and seventeenth with the jury vote in the final. In the public vote, Iceland received an average rank of 13.05, while with the jury vote, Iceland received an average rank of 13.44. In the second semi-final, Iceland placed ninth with the public televote with an average rank of 8.61 and eighth with the jury vote with an average rank of 7.40.

Below is a breakdown of points awarded to Iceland and awarded by Iceland in the second semi-final and grand final of the contest. The nation awarded its 12 points to Norway in the semi-final and to Denmark in the final of the contest.

==== Points awarded to Iceland ====
Points awarded to Iceland (Semi-final 2)
| Score | Country |
|---|---|
| 12 points | Finland; Germany |
| 10 points | Hungary; Latvia; Norway; Switzerland |
| 8 points | |
| 7 points | Spain |
| 6 points | |
| 5 points | |
| 4 points | |
| 3 points | |
| 2 points | |
| 1 point | Armenia |

Points awarded to Iceland (Final)
| Score | Country |
|---|---|
| 12 points | |
| 10 points | |
| 8 points | Germany |
| 7 points | |
| 6 points | Estonia; Hungary; Sweden |
| 5 points | Finland; Switzerland |
| 4 points | Norway; Slovenia |
| 3 points | |
| 2 points | United Kingdom |
| 1 point | Denmark |

==== Points awarded by Iceland ====
Points awarded by Iceland (Semi-final 2)
| Score | Country |
|---|---|
| 12 points | Norway |
| 10 points | Romania |
| 8 points | Azerbaijan |
| 7 points | Finland |
| 6 points | Malta |
| 5 points | Switzerland |
| 4 points | Georgia |
| 3 points | Latvia |
| 2 points | Greece |
| 1 point | Israel |

Points awarded by Iceland (Final)
| Score | Country |
|---|---|
| 12 points | Denmark |
| 10 points | Norway |
| 8 points | Netherlands |
| 7 points | Azerbaijan |
| 6 points | Romania |
| 5 points | Malta |
| 4 points | Sweden |
| 3 points | Ukraine |
| 2 points | France |
| 1 point | Russia |
