= Ég á líf =

Icelandic entry in the Eurovision Song Contest 2013

Single by Eyþór Ingi Gunnlaugsson
- Released: February 2013
- Length: 3:00
- Songwriters: Örlygur Smári, Pétur Örn Gudmundsson

Eurovision Song Contest 2013 entry
- Country: Iceland
- Artist: Eyþór Ingi Gunnlaugsson
- Language: Icelandic
- Composers: Örlygur Smári & Pétur Örn Gudmundsson
- Lyricists: Örlygur Smári & Pétur Örn Gudmundsson

Finals performance
- Semi-final result: 6th
- Semi-final points: 72
- Final result: 17th
- Final points: 47

Entry chronology
- ◄ "Never Forget" (2012)
- "No Prejudice" (2014) ►

"Ég á líf" (I'm alive) is the Icelandic entry in the Eurovision Song Contest 2013 in Malmö and is performed by singer Eyþór Ingi Gunnlaugsson after he won Söngvakeppnin 2013. In the final it placed 17th. The song is the first to be performed in Icelandic since 1997. It is also the first Icelandic entry ever to not have an English version recorded.

== Track listing ==
=== Single release ===
1. "Ég á líf" (Eyþór Ingi) (3:00)

=== Ég á líf: The Malmö Album ===
1. "Ég á líf" (Eyþór Ingi) (3:00)
2. "Þá kem ég heim" (Eyþór Ingi) (2:58)
3. "Hafmey" (Todmobil & Eyþór Ingi) (3:05)
4. "Ég veit og ég sé" (Todmobil & Eyþór Ingi) (5:41)
5. "Hér og nú" (Todmobil & Eyþór Ingi) (5:15)
6. "Ég á líf, Karaoke Version" (Eyþór Ingi) (2:59)
7. "Ég á líf, A.K.A. Club Version" (Eyþór Ingi) (5:36)
8. "Ég á líf, A.K.A. Club Version Karaoke) (Eyþór Ingi) (5:36)

=== Ég á líf (Club Mix) ===
1. "Ég á líf" (Icelandic Esc Entry 2013) -Single (3:00)
2. "Ég á líf" (Ég á líf: The Malmö Album) (3:00)
3. "Ég á líf, A.K.A. Club Version" (Ég á líf: The Malmö Album) (5:36)
4. "Ég á líf, Karaoke Version" (Ég á líf: The Malmö Album) (2:59)
5. "Ég á líf, A.K.A. Club Version Kareoke" (Ég á líf: The Malmö Album) (5:36)
6. "Ég veit og ég sé" (Ég á líf: The Malmö Album) (5:41)
7. "Þá kem ég heim" (Ég á líf: The Malmö Album) (2:58)
8. "Ég á líf (Club Mix)" (Ég á líf (Club Mix) – Single (5:36)
9. "Hér og nú" (Ég á líf: The Malmö Album) (5:15)
10. "Hafmey" (Ég á líf: The Malmö Album) (3:05)

== Chart performance ==
Ég á líf entered the Icelandic charts at number one in the week following the national final where it stayed for four weeks. In the week of March 22 a revamped version of the song was released and opened third on the charts, ultimately climbing up to the third spot.

Chart (2013)	Peak position
Germany (Media Control AG)	75
Iceland (RÚV)	1
Netherlands (Mega Single Top 100)	84
Switzerland (Schweizer Hitparade)	46
