= No Prejudice =

2013 song by Pollapönk

Single by Pollapönk
- Released: 17 December 2013
- Length: 2:46
- Label: Hands Up Music
- Composer: Heiðar Örn Kristjánsson
- Lyricists: Heiðar Örn Kristjánsson; Haraldur Freyr Gíslason; John Grant

Music video
- "No Prejudice" on YouTube

Eurovision Song Contest 2014 entry
- Country: Iceland
- Artist: Pollapönk
- Languages: English
- Composer: Heiðar Örn Kristjánsson
- Lyricists: Heiðar Örn Kristjánsson; Haraldur Freyr Gíslason; John Grant

Finals performance
- Semi-final result: 8th
- Semi-final points: 61
- Final result: 15th
- Final points: 58

Entry chronology
- ◄ "Ég á líf" (2013)
- "Unbroken" (2015) ►

Song presentation
- file; help

Official performance video
- "No Prejudice" (Final) on YouTube

"No Prejudice" (in Icelandic: Enga fordóma) is a song by Icelandic band Pollapönk. It represented Iceland at the Eurovision Song Contest 2014 in Denmark. The song was initially performed in Icelandic as "Enga fordóma" at the Icelandic national final, but was translated into English for Eurovision. The song was co-written by American musician John Grant.

== Background ==
Pollapönk, an Icelandic punk children's band, entered Söngvakeppnin 2014 with the song "Enga fordóma". According to the band, "Enga fordóma" is about a "young person who has the habit of stuttering around others and fears to be mocked or bullied because of [their stutter]." The band also pointed out that the band, the members of which were all white and heterosexual, was important to point out injustices in the world.

In an interview with Eurovision fansite Wiwibloggs, the song was changed to English because "it was necessary that more people could understand what [Pollapönk] are all about."

== Release ==
The song was released on 17 December 2013, on Icelandic television programme Kastljós along with all other songs competing in Söngvakeppnin 2014.

== Music video ==
For live performances of the song in the Icelandic national final Söngvakeppnin and at the Eurovision Song Contest, the group was accompanied on backing vocals by Óttarr Proppé, a Bright Future party politician and member of the Iceland parliament. The music video shows the members of the band using cardboard props to rescue a group of people having a party that are being held hostage by an evil villain who turns everything black. Pollaponk then uses their instruments to blast the cage holding the party goers open and destroying the villain's weapon. The bright colors are restored and the villain's black clothes turn brightly colored implying a change of heart. The video ends with everyone dancing and celebrating.

== Eurovision Song Contest ==
=== Söngvakeppnin 2014 ===
Söngvakeppnin 2014 was the national final format developed by RÚV in order to select Iceland's entry for the Eurovision Song Contest 2014. Ten songs in total competed in Söngvakeppnin 2014 where the winner was determined after two semi-finals and a final. Five songs competed in each semi-final on 1 and 8 February 2014. The top two songs from each semi-final, as determined by public televoting qualified to the final which took place on 15 February 2014. Two wildcard acts were selected by a jury for the final out of the remaining non-qualifying acts from both semi-finals. The winning entry in the final was determined over two rounds of voting: the first to select the top two via 50/50 public televoting and jury voting and the second to determine the winner with 100% televoting. All songs were required to be performed in Icelandic during the semi-final and first round of the final portion of the competition. In the second round of the final, the song was required to be performed in the language that the artist intended to perform in at the Eurovision Song Contest in Copenhagen.

On 3 September 2013, RÚV opened the submission period for interested songwriters to submit their entries until the deadline on 7 October 2014, which was later extended by one week to 14 October 2013. At the close of the submission deadline, 297 entries were received. A selection committee was formed in order to select the top ten entries. The ten competing artists and songs were revealed by the broadcaster during the television programme Kastljós on 17 December 2013.

"Enga fordóma" competed in the second semi-final, and qualified with a public televoting slot.

The final took place on 2 February 2013 where the six entries that qualified from the preceding two semi-finals competed. In the first round of voting, votes from a jury panel (50%) and public televoting (50%) determined the top two entries to advanced to a second round of voting, the superfinal. In the semi-finals and first round of the final, all competing entries were required to be performed in Icelandic; however, entries competing in the superfinal were required to be presented in the language they would compete with in the Eurovision Song Contest. "Enga fordóma" would earn first in the final, earning a spot to move on to the superfinal.

For the superfinal, the band would change the song to English, giving the song new English lyrics and title. The song would win the superfinal, earning the Icelandic spot for the Eurovision Song Contest 2014.

=== At Eurovision ===
According to Eurovision rules, all nations with the exceptions of the host country and the "Big Five" (France, Germany, Italy, Spain and the United Kingdom) are required to qualify from one of two semi-finals in order to compete for the final; the top ten countries from each semi-final progress to the final. The European Broadcasting Union (EBU) split up the competing countries into six different pots based on voting patterns from previous contests, with countries with favourable voting histories put into the same pot. On 20 January 2014, a special allocation draw was held which placed each country into one of the two semi-finals, as well as which half of the show they would perform in. Iceland was placed into the first semi-final, to be held on 6 May 2014, and was scheduled to perform in the first half of the show.

"No Prejudice" would qualify from the first semi-final, earning 61 points, well enough for eighth. Shortly after the first semi-final, a winners' press conference was held for the ten qualifying countries. As part of this press conference, the qualifying artists took part in a draw to determine which half of the grand final they would subsequently participate in. This draw was done in the order the countries were announced during the semi-final. Iceland was drawn to compete in the first half. Following this draw, the shows' producers decided upon the running order of the final, as they had done for the semi-finals. Iceland was subsequently placed to perform in position 4, following the entry from Azerbaijan and before the entry from Norway.

In the final, the song would earn a 15th place finish, earning 58 points.

== Charts ==
Chart (2014)	Peak position
Austria (Ö3 Austria Top 40)	68
Iceland (RÚV)	1
UK Singles (OCC)	70

== See also ==
- Iceland in the Eurovision Song Contest 2014
