= Ofer Nachshon =

Israeli radio announcer (1966–2025)

- עופר נחשון
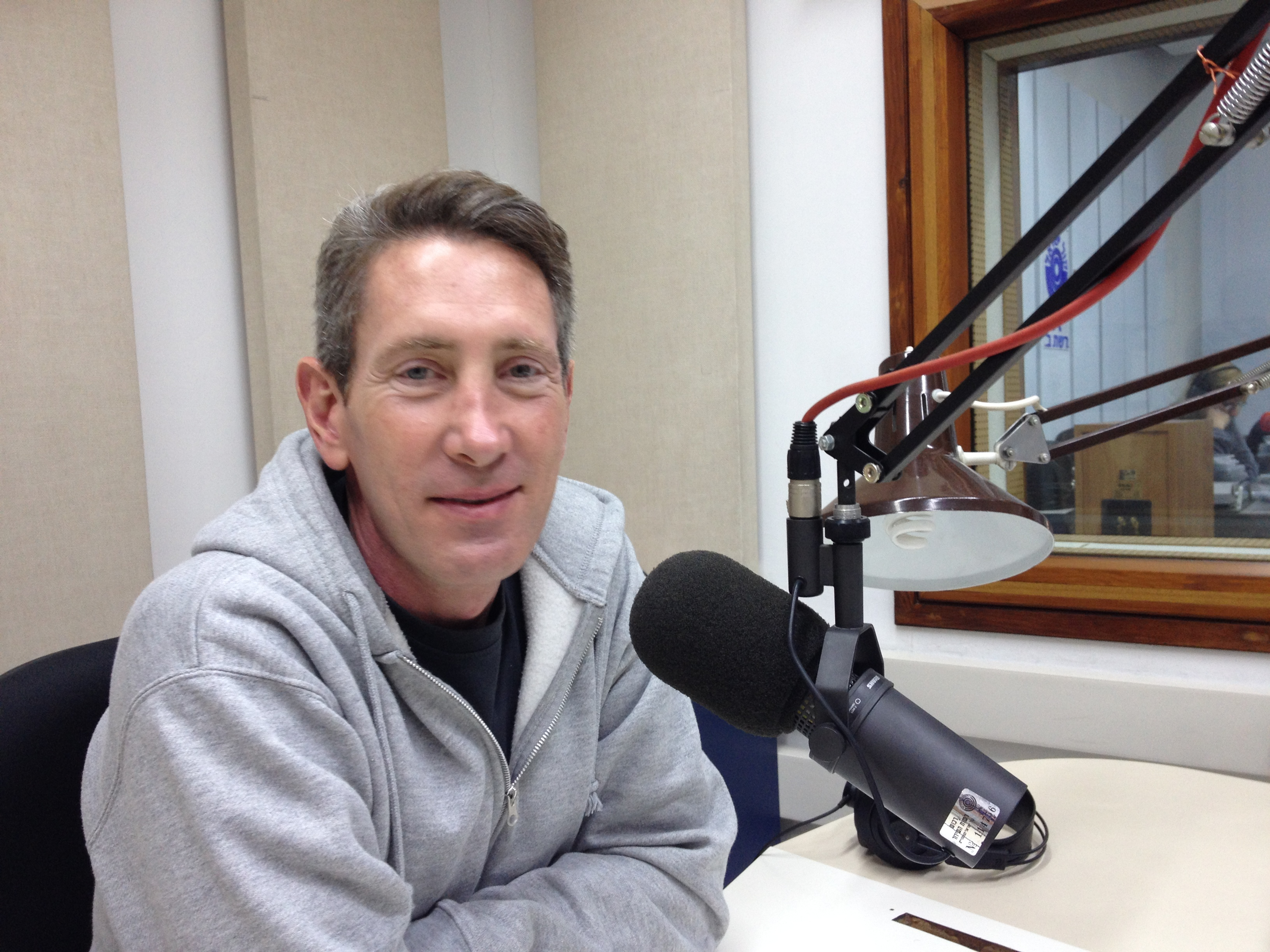
- Nachshon in 2014
- Born: 27 April 1966; Holon, Israel
- Died: 25 October 2025 (aged 59); Israel
- Citizenship: Israel
- Occupations: Television and radio presenter
- Years active: 1988–2024
- Employers: Israel Broadcasting Authority (IBA) (1988–2017); Israeli Public Broadcasting Corporation (IPBC/Kan) (2017–2024)

Ofer Nachshon (Hebrew: עופר נחשון; 27 April 1966 – 25 October 2025) was an Israeli broadcaster and radio announcer. He was best known internationally as the spokesperson of the Israeli vote in the Eurovision Song Contest between 2009 and 2017, often greeting the viewers with a few words in the host nation's own language. He was one of the first openly gay high-profile personalities in Israel.

In 2017, he caused a minor scandal when, while reading the Israeli jury points, he announced that the Eurovision Song Contest 2017 would be the Israel Broadcasting Authority's final broadcast. This was incorrectly interpreted by international media outlets as Israel withdrawing from the contest.

Nachshon died on 25 October 2025, at the age of 59.
