= The Unknown (Madeline Juno album) =

Studio album by Madeline Juno
- Released: March 7, 2014
- Genre: Pop
- Length: 60:32
- Label: Polydor (UMG)
- Producers: Patrick Benzner; Dave Roth

Singles from The Unknown
- 1. "Error" Released: November 1, 2013; 2. "Like Lovers Do" Released: February 28, 2014

The Unknown is the first album by German singer-songwriter Madeline Juno. It was released on March 7, 2014, by Polydor and peaked at number 24 on the German album charts.

== Background ==
Juno had worked on the album for four years. She started in 2009 when she was 14 years old and has uploaded some of her songs on YouTube. She wrote the song "Melancholy Heartbeat" at the age of 14. During an interview Juno stated that her favourite song is "Like Lovers Do". Juno describes the album as "acoustic and melodic music full of hope" and calls her music "Heart-Core". All songs are in English and were written by Madeline Juno, David Jost and Dave Roth.

== Release and promotion ==
The Unknown was released on March 7, 2014, in Germany, Austria and Switzerland. It could be pre-ordered since February 16, 2014, on iTunes. Everyone who pre-ordered got a free copy of the singles "Error" and "Sympathy". Erhältlich ist das Album als CD und Download. On December 13, 2013, it was announced that Madeline Juno would perform on the German national final for the Eurovision Song Contest 2014 called Unser Song für Dänemark für den Eurovision Song Contest 2014 where she performs the singles Error and Like Lovers Do. Juno participates on Adel Tawil's tour Lieder-Tour 2014.

== Track listing ==
#	Song	Writer(s)	Producer(s)	Length
1	The Unknown	Madeline Juno, Dave Roth	Patrick Benzner, Dave Roth	3:05
2	Like Lovers Do	Madeline Juno, Dave Roth	Patrick Benzner, Dave Roth	3:12
3	Six Cigarettes	Madeline Juno, Dave Roth	Patrick Benzner, Dave Roth	3:39
4	Day One	Madeline Juno, Dave Roth	Patrick Benzner, Dave Roth	3:45
5	Feel You	David Jost, Madeline Juno, Dave Roth	Patrick Benzner, Dave Roth	3:34
6	Same Sky	Madeline Juno, Dave Roth	Patrick Benzner, Dave Roth	3:00
7	Error	David Jost, Madeline Juno, Dave Roth	Patrick Benzner, Dave Roth	3:57
8	Vertigo	Madeline Juno, Dave Roth	Patrick Benzner, Dave Roth	3:53
9	Melancholy Heartbeat	Madeline Juno, Dave Roth	Patrick Benzner, Dave Roth	4:19
10	Second Time Around	Madeline Juno, Dave Roth	Patrick Benzner, Dave Roth	3:18
11	Sympathy	Madeline Juno, Dave Roth	Patrick Benzner, Dave Roth	4:54
12	Always This Way	Madeline Juno, Dave Roth	Patrick Benzner, Dave Roth	4:36
13	Do It Again	David Jost, Madeline Juno, Dave Roth	Patrick Benzner, Dave Roth	3:23
14	If This Was a Movie	Madeline Juno, Dave Roth	Patrick Benzner, Dave Roth	4:10
15	Ego You	Madeline Juno, Dave Roth	Patrick Benzner, Dave Roth	3:57
16	Another You	Madeline Juno, Dave Roth	Patrick Benzner, Dave Roth	3:50

== Personnel ==
- Patrick Benzner: record producer
- David Jost: composer
- Madeline Juno: vocals, composer
- Dave Roth: composer, producer

== Charts ==
Chart	Peak position
Germany	24
Switzerland	45

== Lieder tour 2014 ==
Madeline Juno took part in the Lieder of the German singer Adel Tawil where she served as a supporting act.

Date	Town	Place	Country
March 21, 2014	Munich	Olympiahalle	Germany
March 22, 2014	Vienna	Wiener Stadthalle	Austria
March 24, 2014	Freiburg	Rothaus Arena	Germany
March 25, 2014	Stuttgart	Porsche-Arena	Germany
March 27, 2014	Hanover	TUI Arena	Germany
March 28, 2014	Schwerin	Sport- und Kongresshalle	Germany
March 29, 2014	Berlin	O_{2} World	Germany
March 31, 2014	Magdeburg	GETEC Arena	Germany
April 1, 2014	Köln	Lanxess Arena	Germany
April 3, 2014	Hamburg	O_{2} World	Germany
April 4, 2014	Oberhausen	König-Pilsener-Arena	Germany
April 5, 2014	Nuremberg	Nuremberg Arena	Germany
April 7, 2014	Leipzig	Arena Leipzig	Germany
April 8, 2014	Chemnitz	Chemnitz Arena	Germany
April 9, 2014	Saarbrücken	Saarlandhalle	Germany
April 11, 2014	Frankfurt am Main	Festhalle Frankfurt	Germany
April 12, 2014	Erfurt	Messehalle	Germany
April 13, 2014	Halle/Westfalen	Gerry Weber Stadion	Germany
