= Like Lovers Do =

Like Lovers Do may refer to:

- "Like Lovers Do" (Madeline Juno song), 2014
- "Like Lovers Do" (Lloyd Cole song), 1995
- "Like Lovers Do", a song by Roxette on the 1986 album Pearls of Passion
- "Like Lovers Do", a song by Heather Nova on the 2011 album South
- "Like Lovers Do", a song by Hey Violet on the 2017 album From the Outside
- "Like Lovers Do", a single by Jude Cole from his 1987 self-titled album

== See also ==
- "What Lovers Do", a 2017 single by Maroon 5 featuring SZA
