= The Masked Singer (German TV series) season 9 =

The Masked Singer
- Season 9
- Starring: Ruth Moschner; Álvaro Soler; Rick Kavanian; Various guests
- Hosted by: Matthias Opdenhövel
- No. of contestants: 9
- Winner: Jennifer Weist as "Eisprinzessin"
- Runner-up: Pasquale Aleardi as "Lulatsch"
- No. of episodes: 6

Release
- Original network: ProSieben
- Original release: 18 November – 23 December 2023

Season chronology
- ← Previous; Season 8 Next → Season 10

The ninth season of the German singing competition The Masked Singer premiered on 18 November 2023 on ProSieben.

== Panelists and host ==
Season 9 main panelists and host

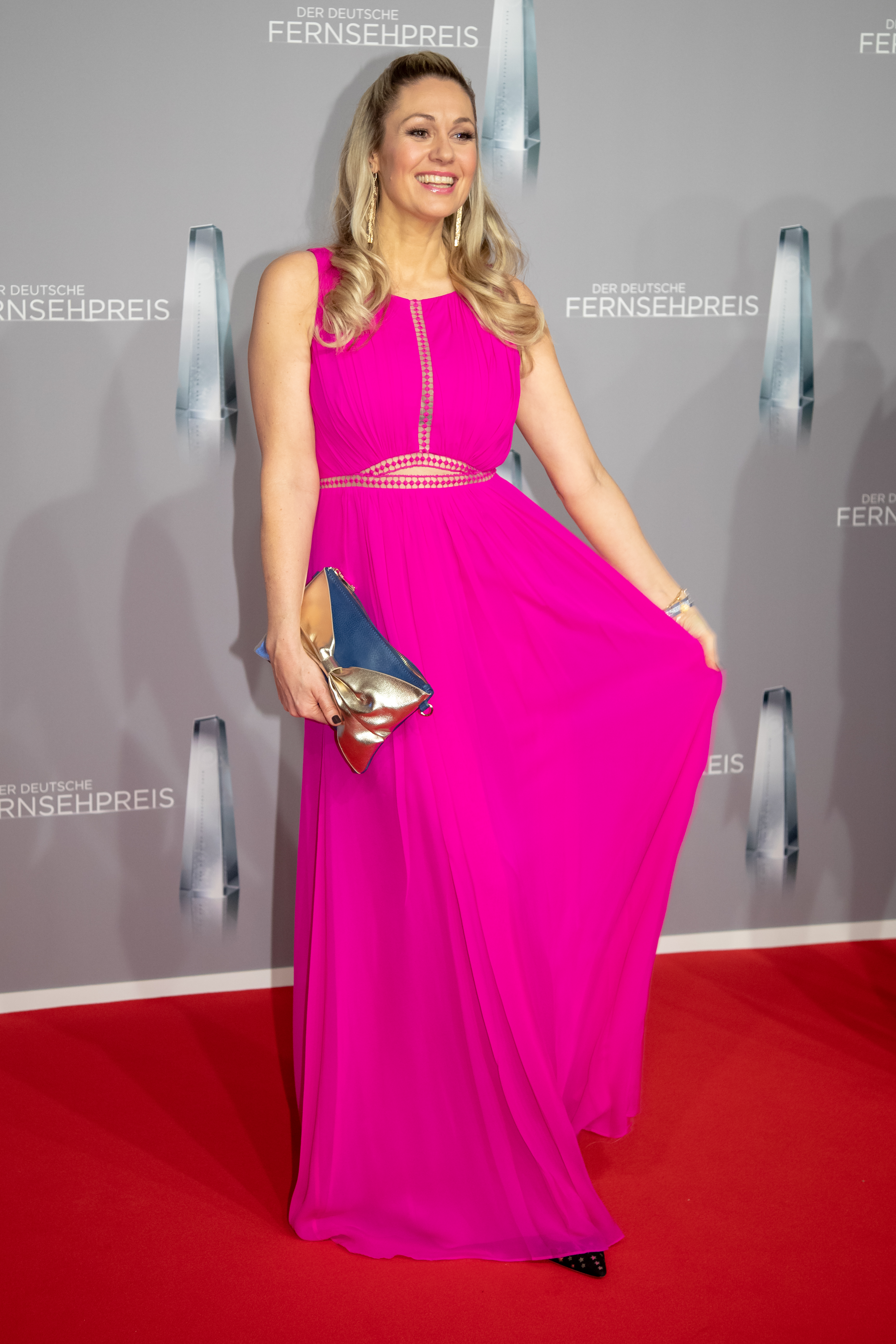
Ruth Moschner

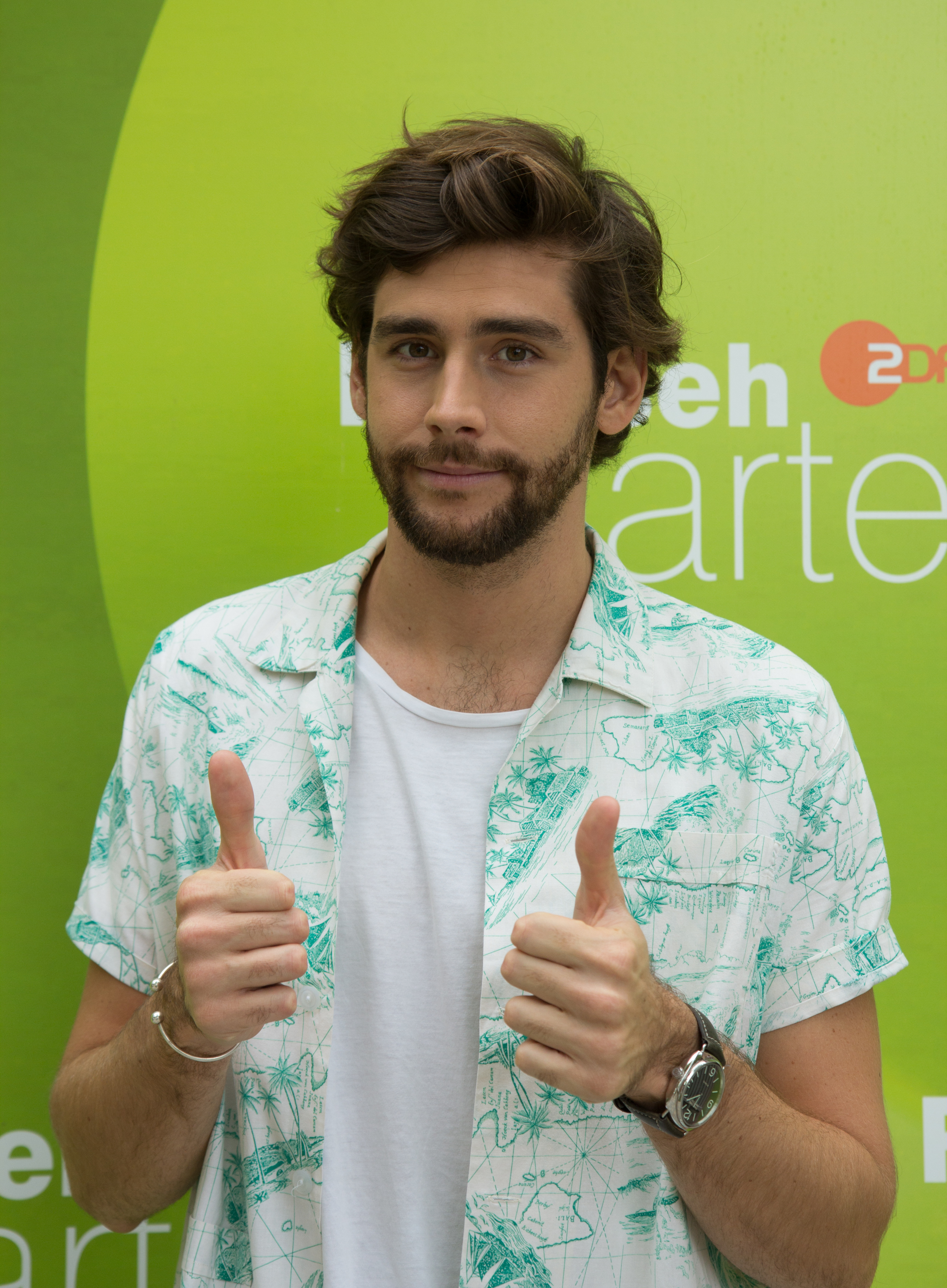
Álvaro Soler

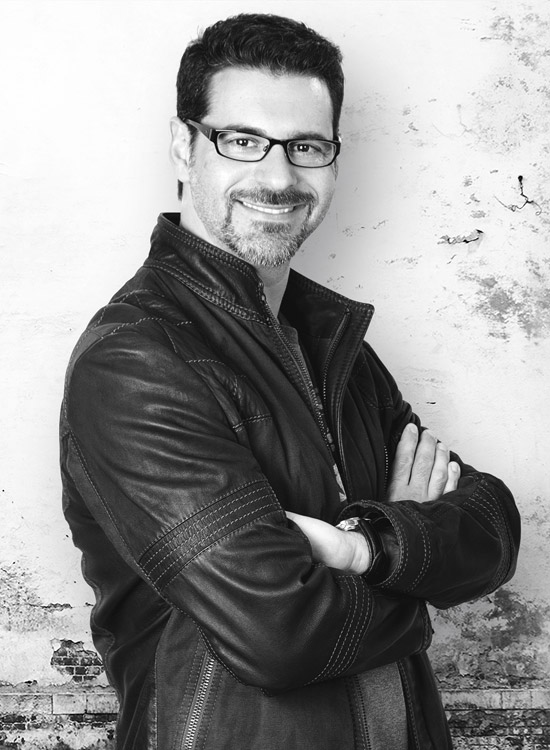
Rick Kavanian

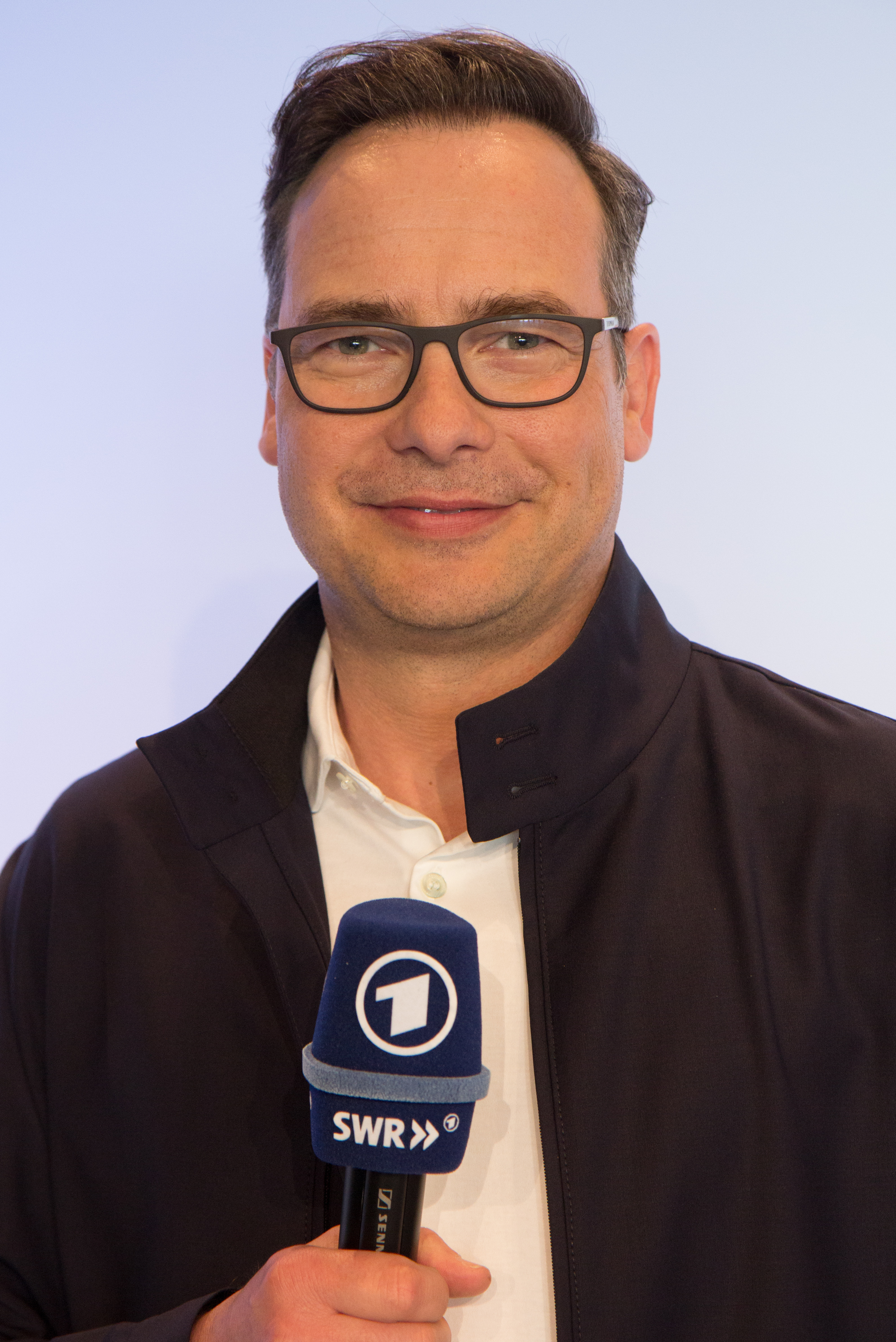
Matthias Opdenhövel

TV presenter Ruth Moschner returned for her eighth season, and Álvaro Soler, who previously appeared as a guest panelist in season 5, returned as a full panelist. Matthias Opdenhövel returned for his ninth season as host. For the three remaining episodes, Álvaro Soler did not appear for personal reasons, so he was replaced by Rick Kavanian.

=== Guest panelists ===
Various guest panelists appeared as the third judge in the judging panel for one episode. These guest panelists included:

Season 9 guest panelists

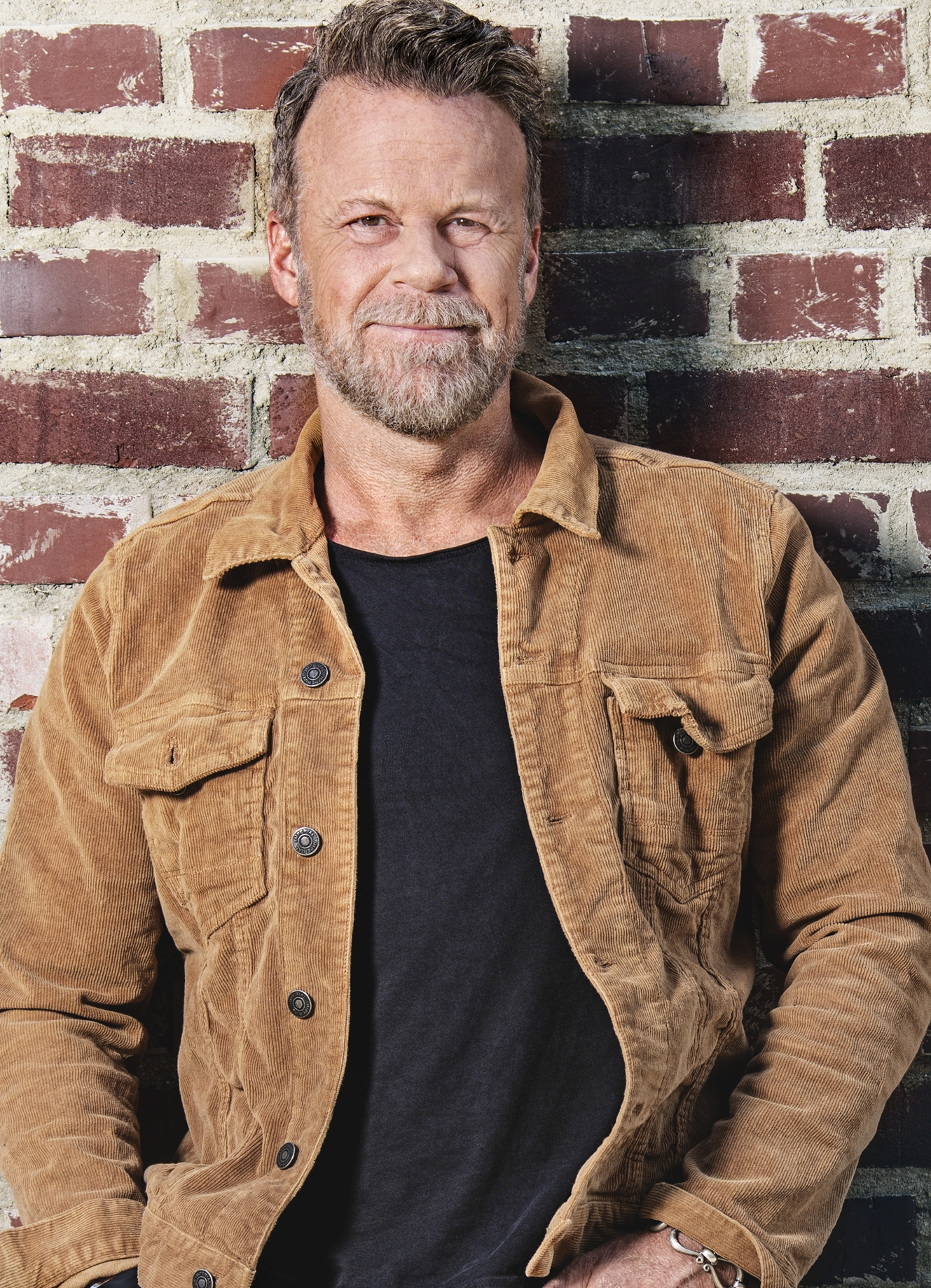
Jenke von Wilmsdorff (episode 1)

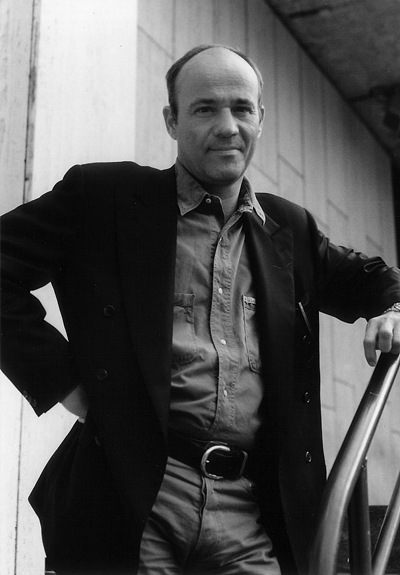
Heiner Lauterbach (episode 2)

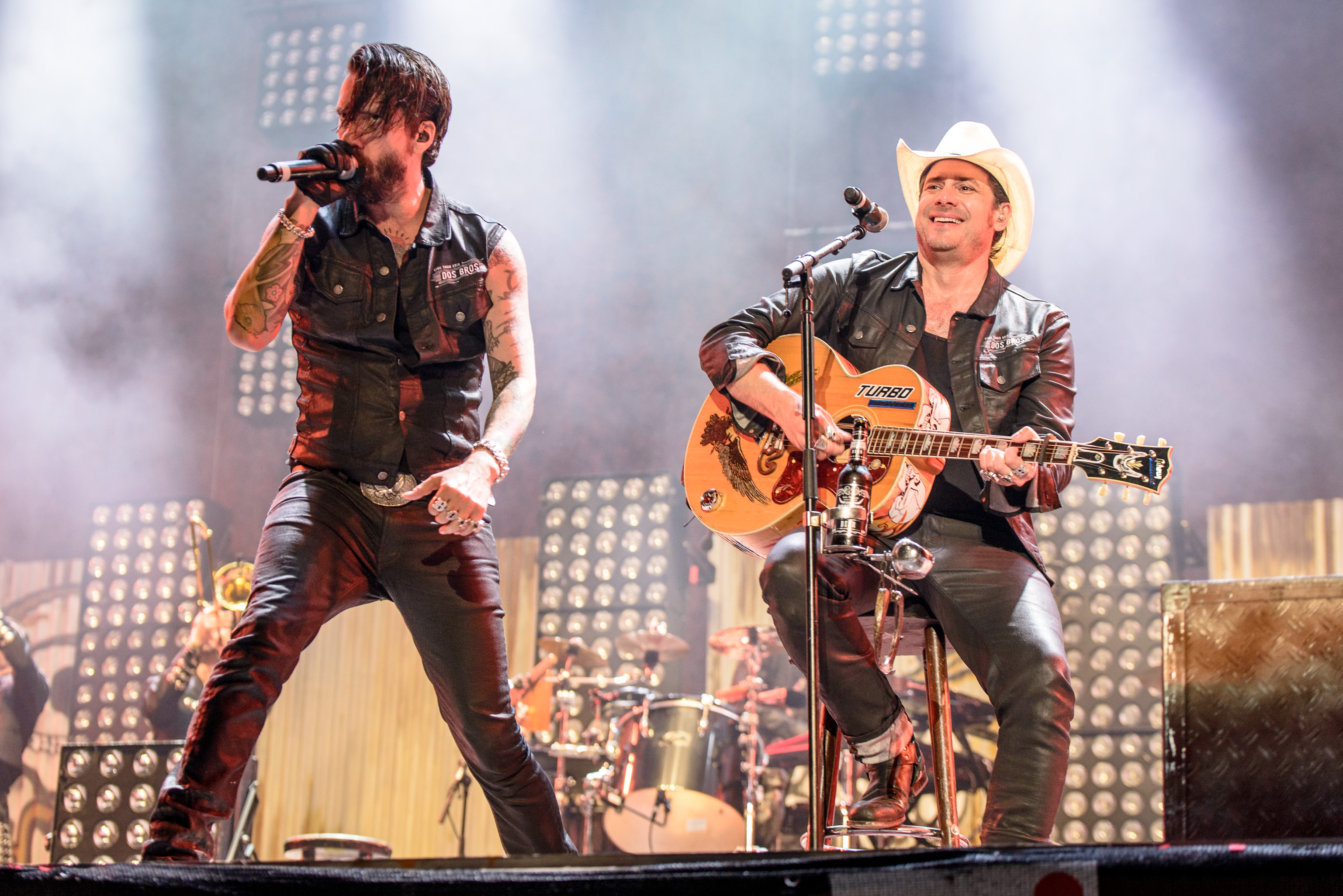
The BossHoss (episode 3)

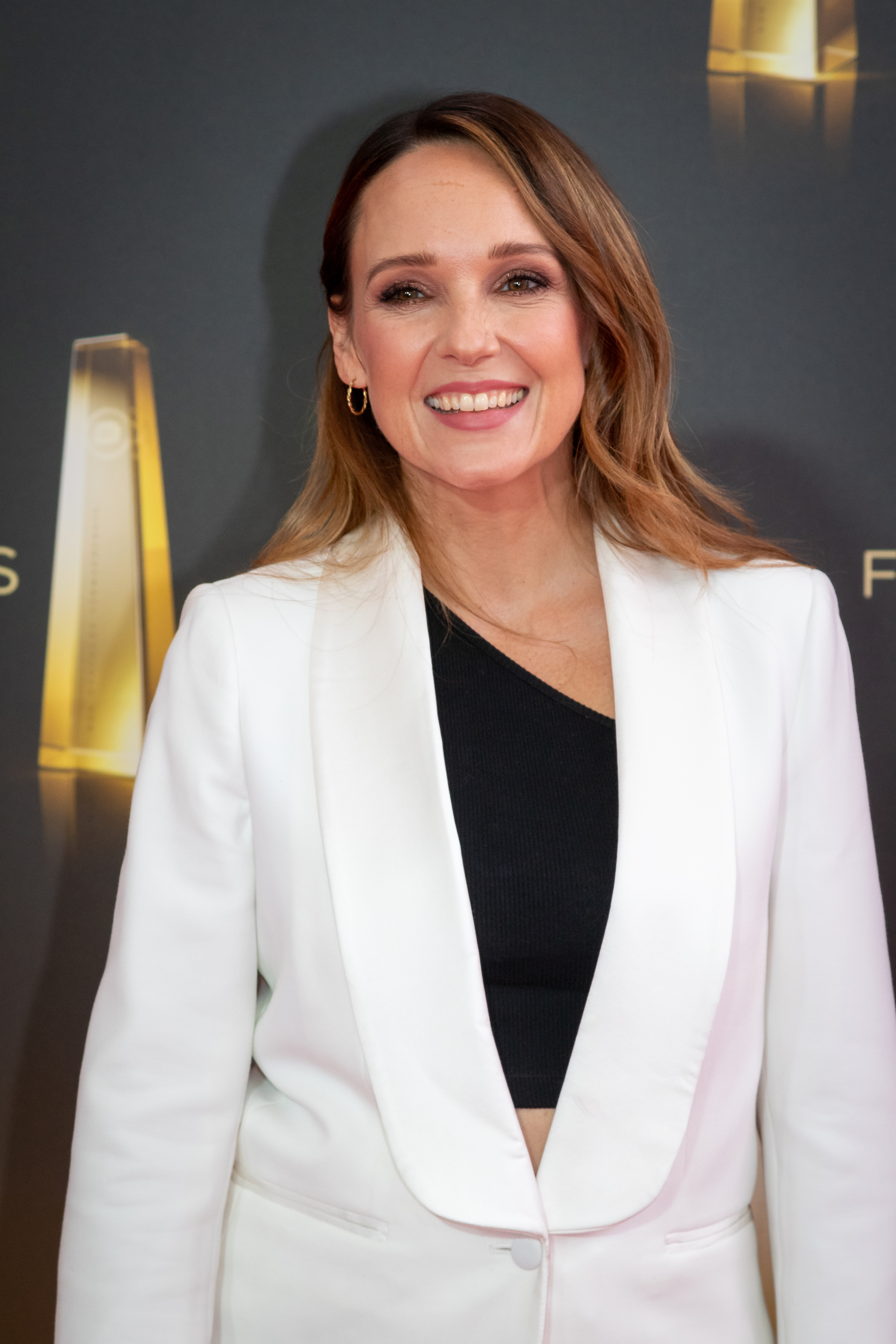
Carolin Kebekus and David Kebekus (not pictured) (episode 4)

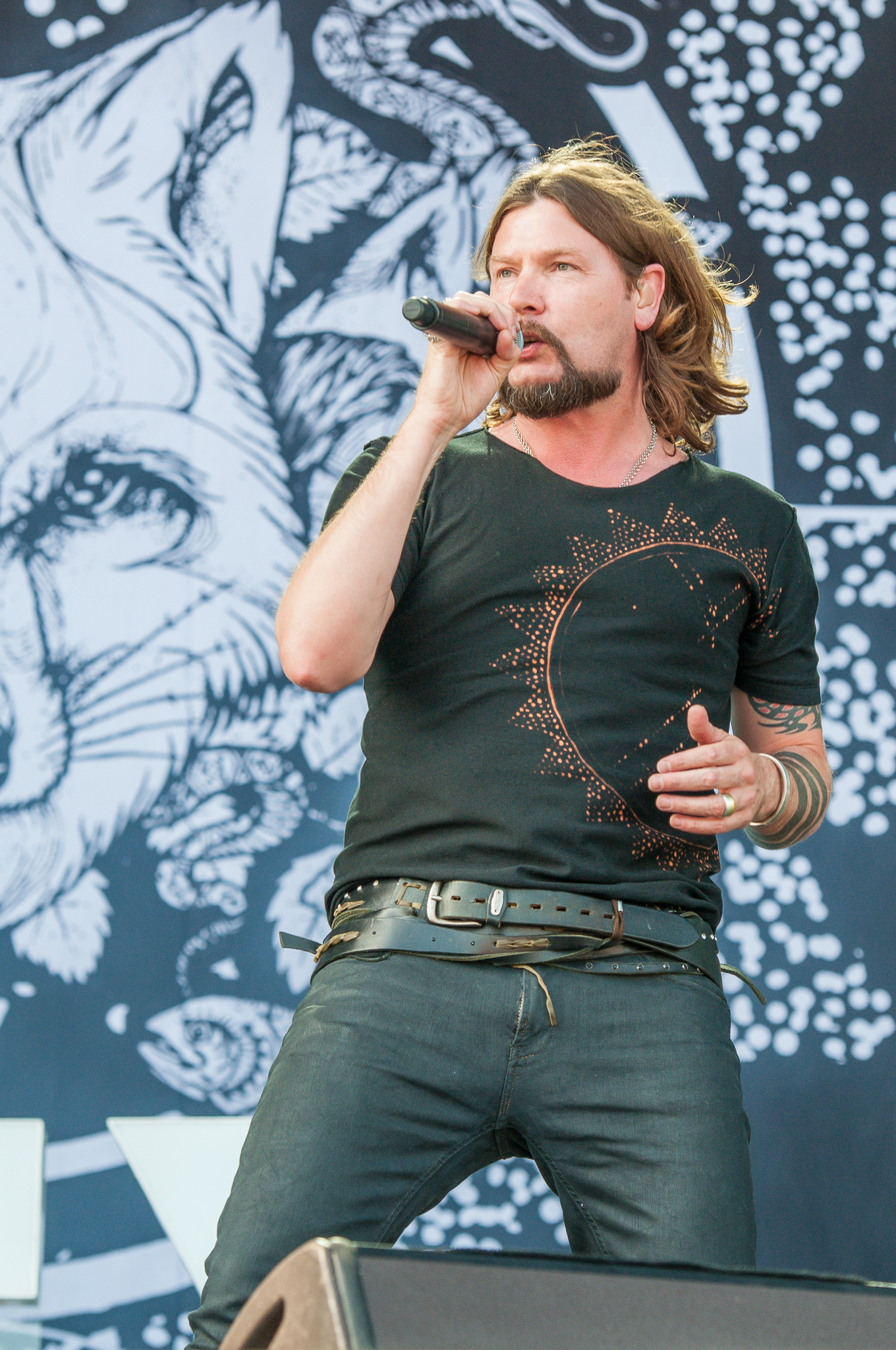
Rea Garvey (episode 5)

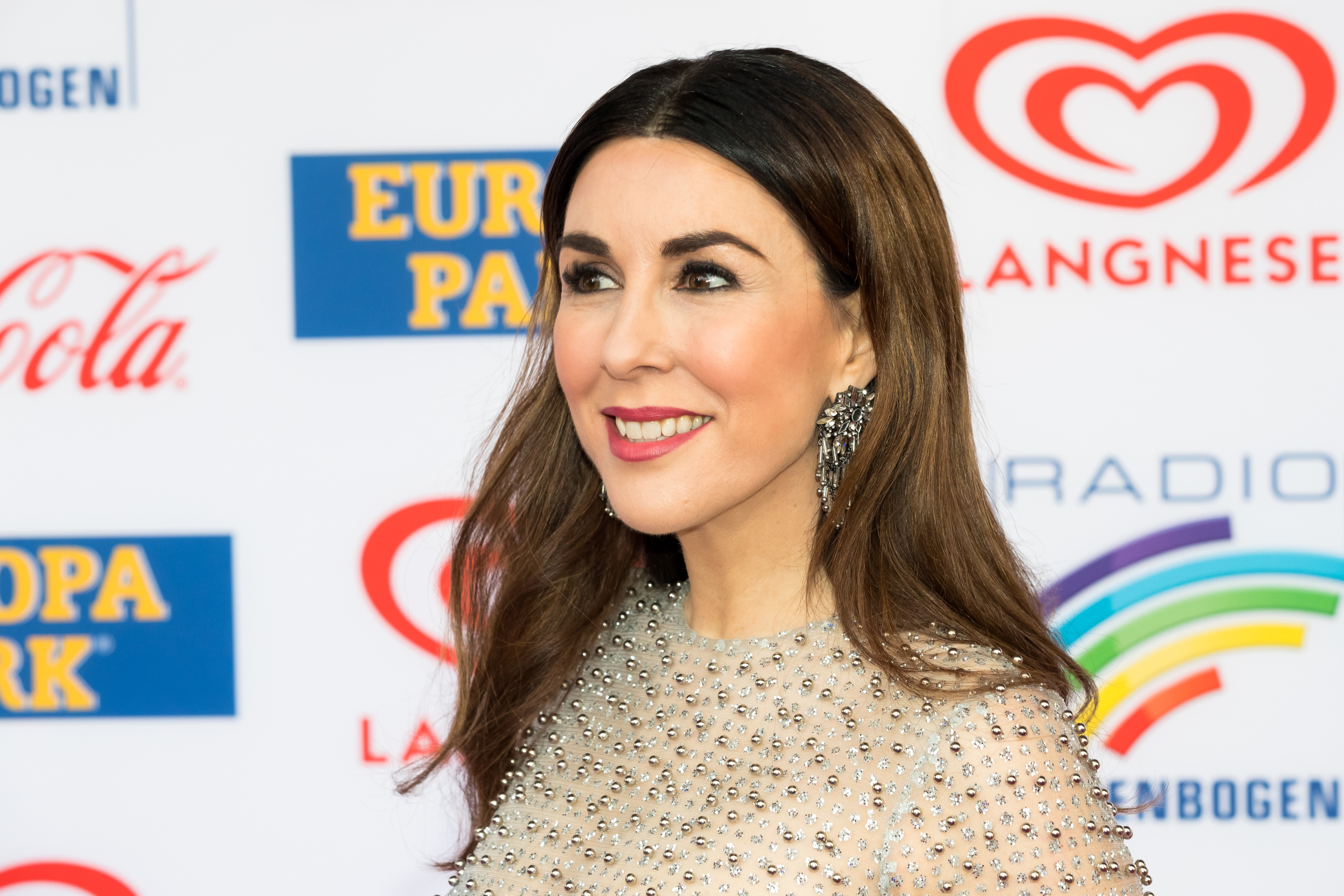
Judith Williams (episode 6)

Episode	Panelist		Guest Panelist	Notability
1	Ruth Moschner	Álvaro Soler	Jenke von Wilmsdorff	Actor
2	Ruth Moschner	Álvaro Soler	Heiner Lauterbach	Actor
3	Ruth Moschner	Álvaro Soler	The BossHoss	Band
4	Ruth Moschner	Rick Kavanian	Kebekus siblings	Comedians
5	Ruth Moschner	Rick Kavanian	Rea Garvey	Singer
6	Ruth Moschner	Rick Kavanian	Judith Williams	Presenter

== Contestants ==
The season features 9 contestants.

Results
Stage name	Celebrity	Notability	Live Episodes							
Stage name	Celebrity	Notability	1	2	3	4	5	6		
Stage name	Celebrity	Notability	1	2	3	4	5	A	B	C
Eisprinzessin "Ice Princess"	Jennifer Weist	Singer	RISK	WIN	RISK	WIN	WIN	SAFE	SAFE	WINNER
Lulatsch	Pasquale Aleardi	Actor	RISK	RISK	WIN	RISK	RISK	SAFE	SAFE	RUNNER-UP
Mustang	Hendrik Duryn	Actor	WIN	RISK	RISK	WIN	RISK	SAFE	THIRD	
Troll	Mieze Katz	Singer	WIN	WIN	WIN	RISK	WIN	OUT		
Klaus Claus	Tim Bendzko	Singer	WIN	WIN	WIN	WIN	OUT			
Kiwi	Uwe Ochsenknecht	Actor	WIN	WIN	RISK	OUT				
Marsmaus "Mars Mouse" (WC)	Jenke von Wilmsdorff	Actor		RISK	OUT					
Feuerlöscher "Fire Extinguisher"	Eva Padberg	Model	RISK	OUT						
Okapi	Katja Ebstein	Singer	OUT							

The masked singer won their face-off and remained in the competition.
The masked singer lost their face-off and was in the bottom four/three/two, but was not eliminated.
The masked singer was safe from elimination.
The masked singer was eliminated from the competition and unmasked upon their elimination.
The masked singer did not perform.

(WC) This masked singer is a wild card contestant.

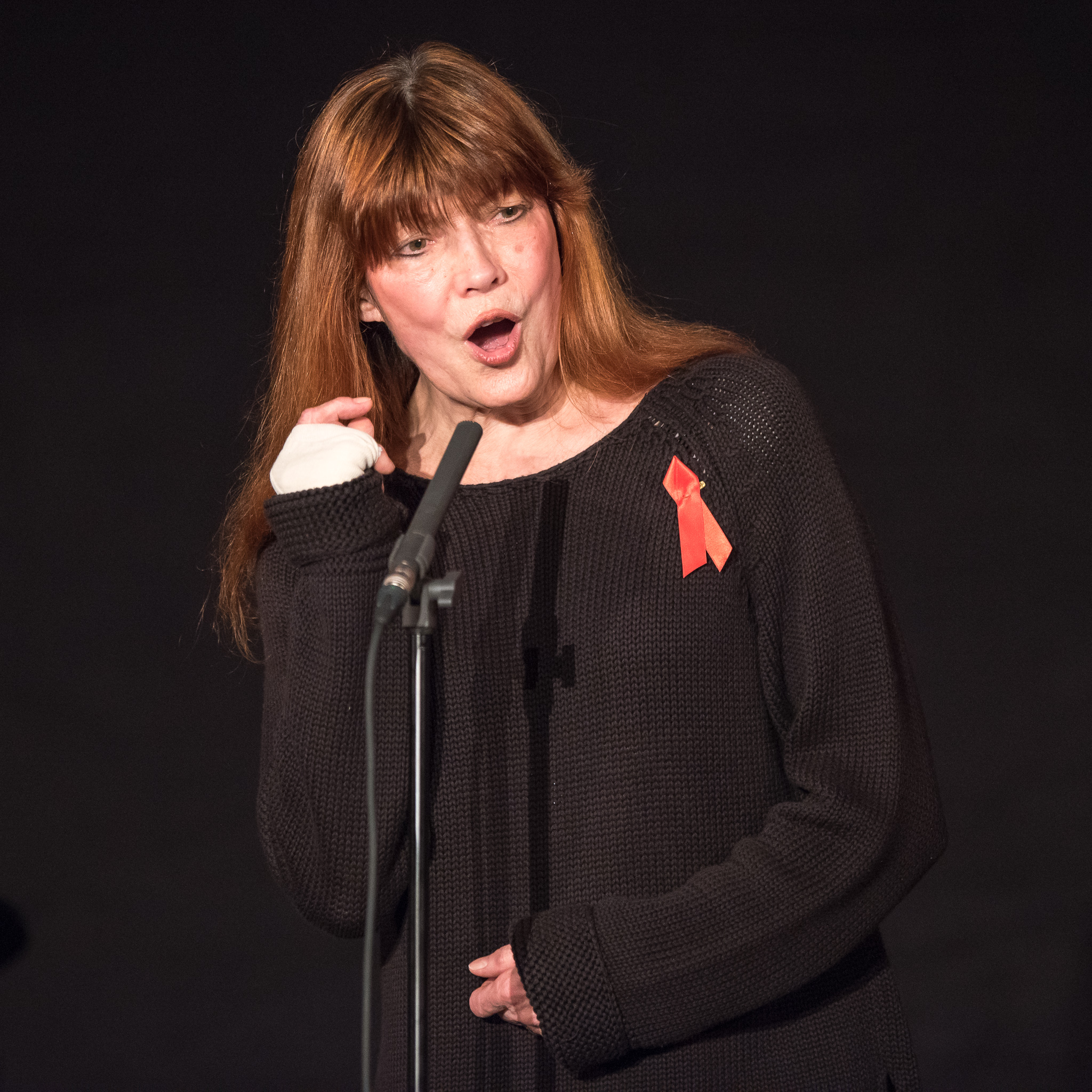
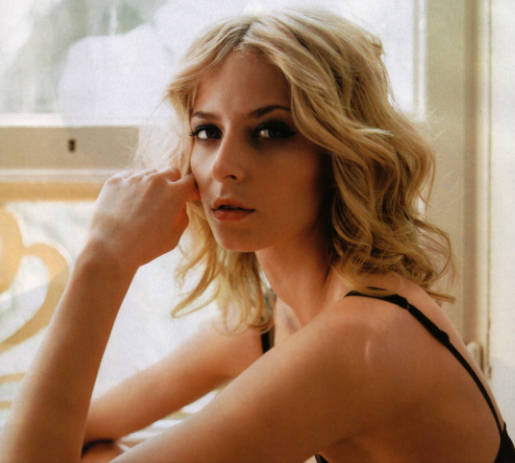
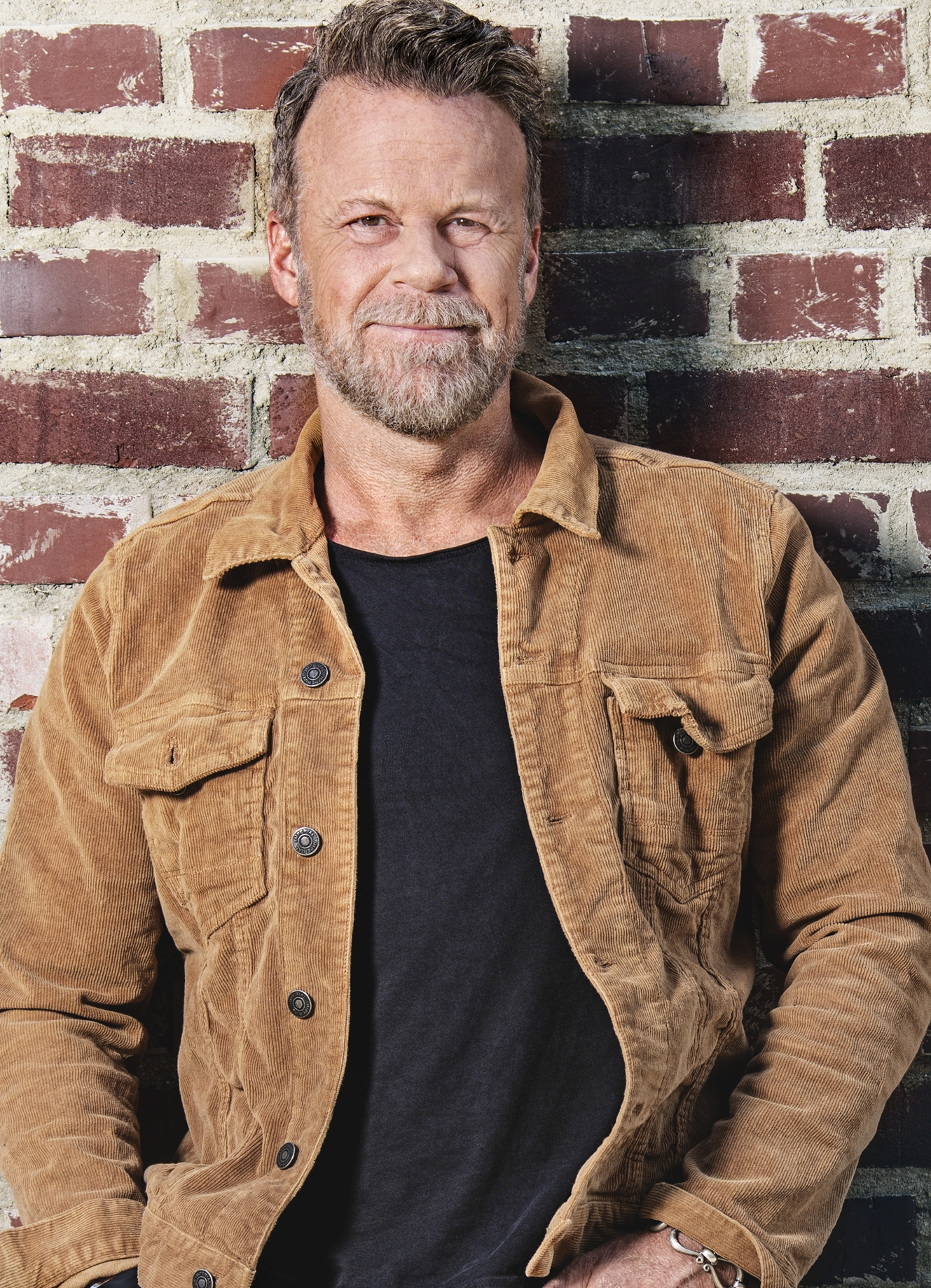
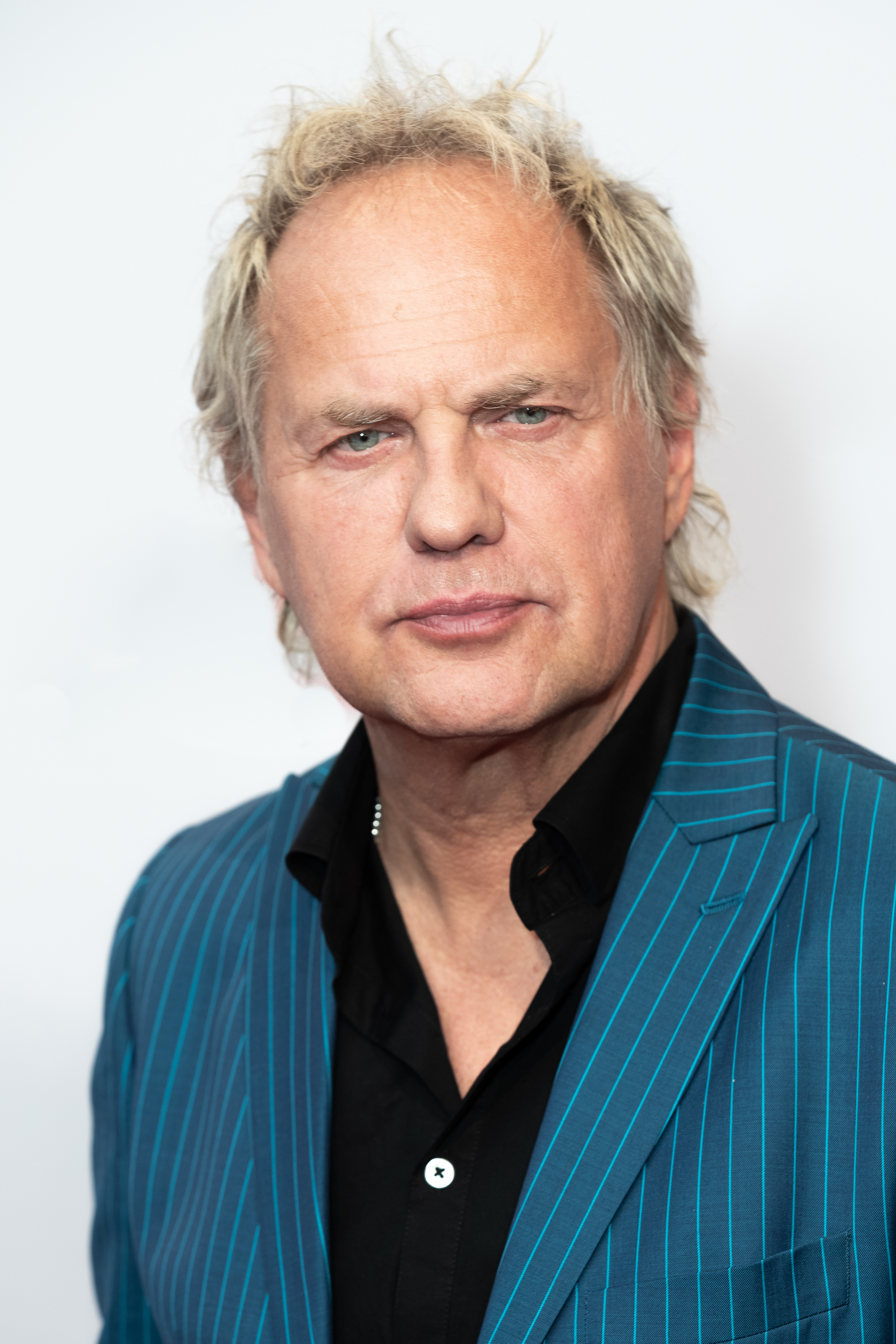
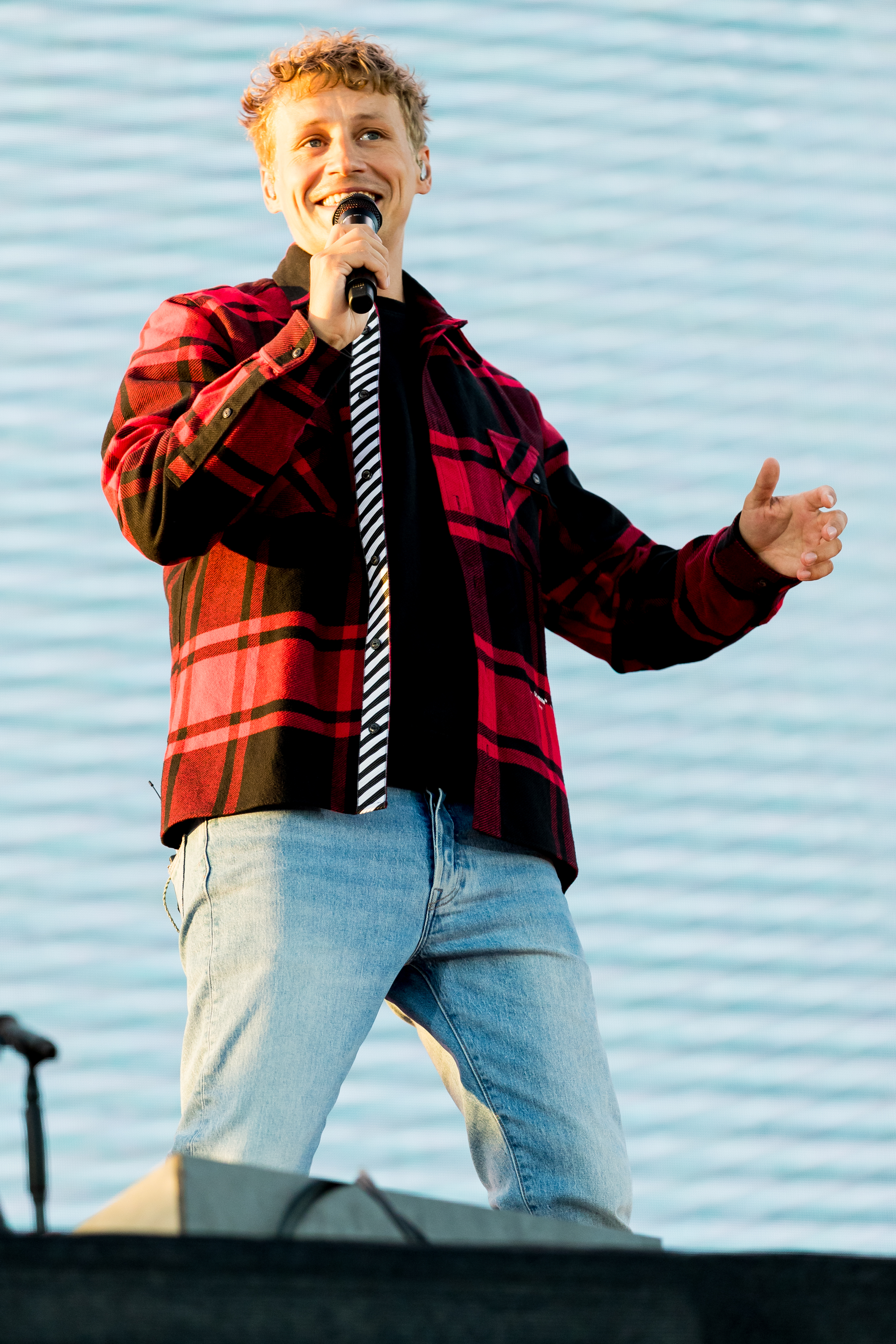
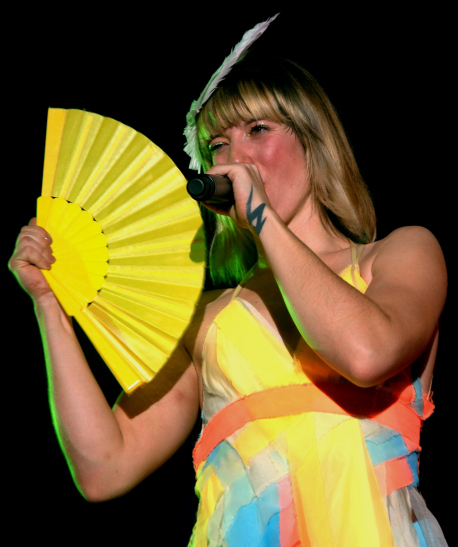
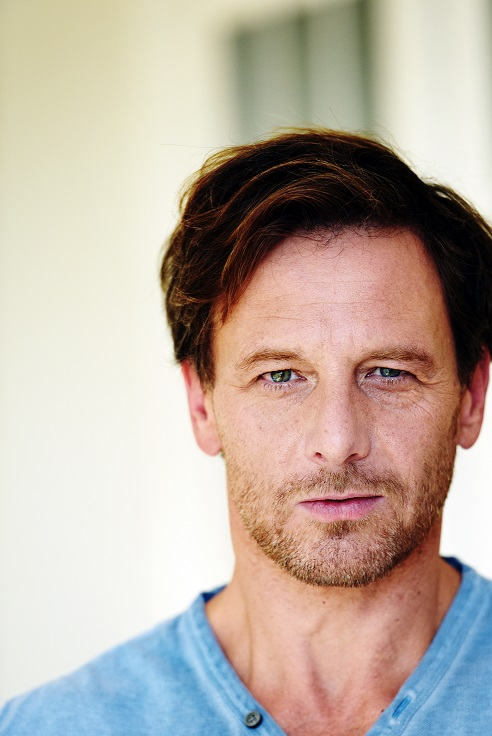
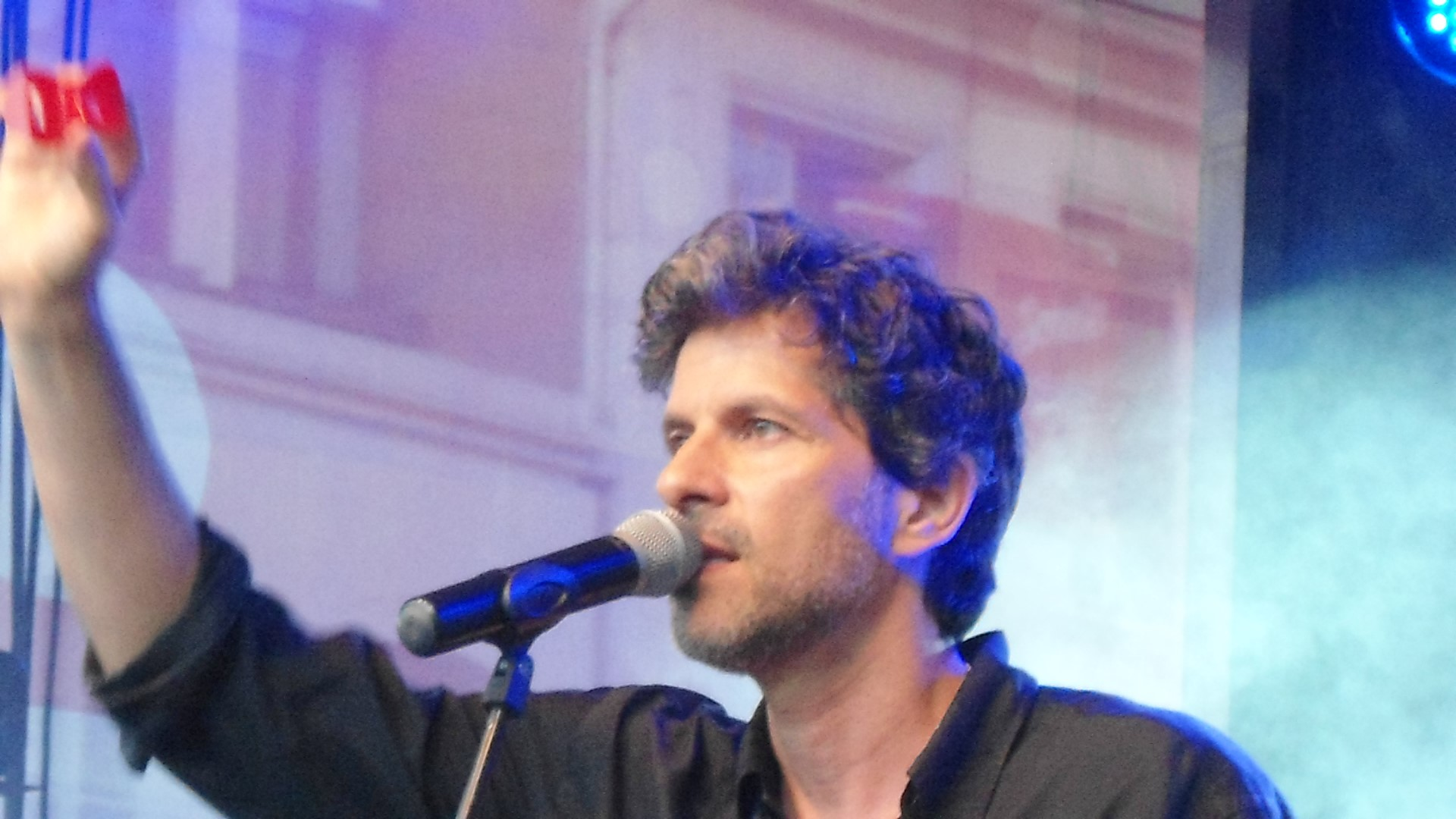
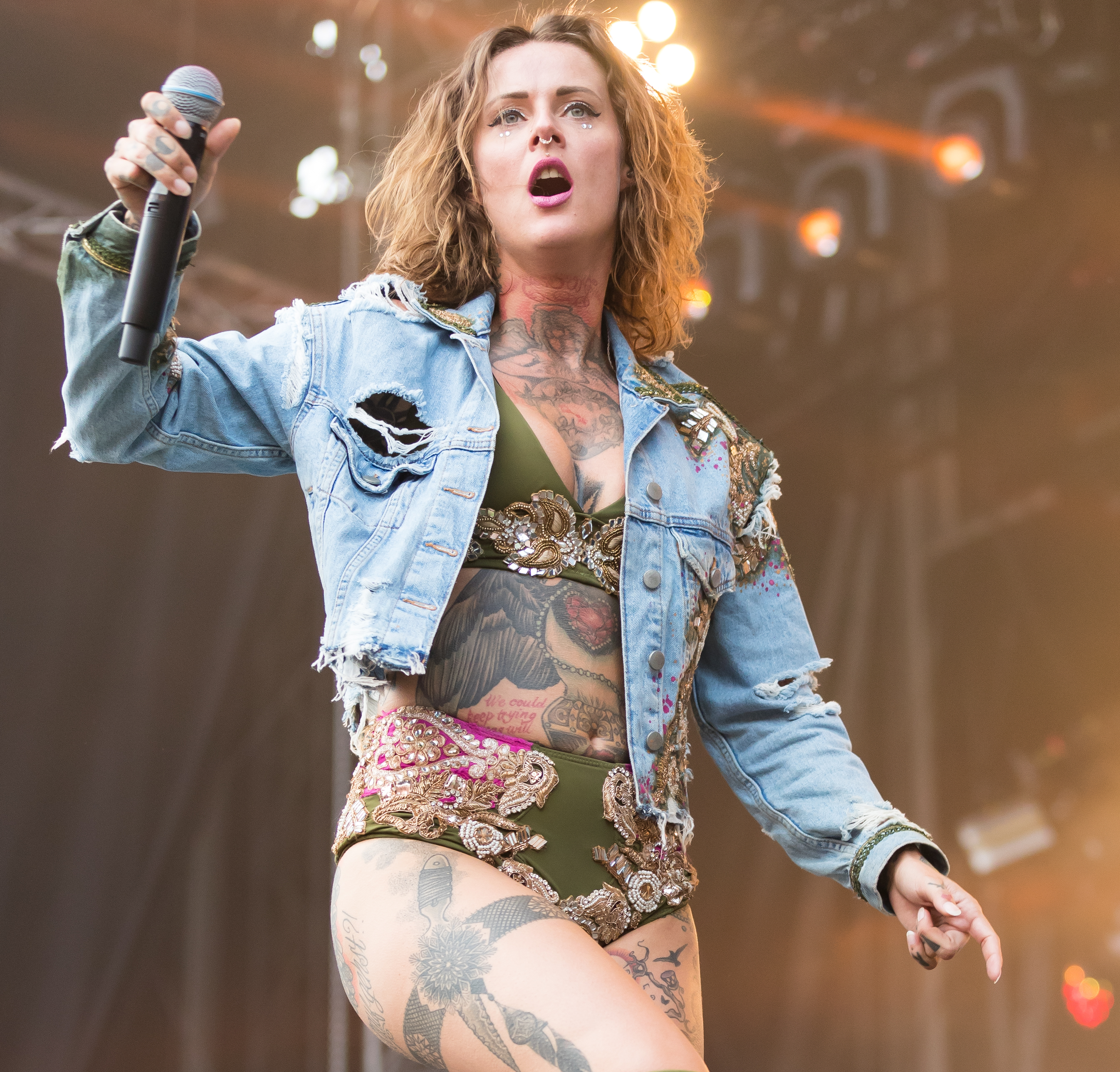
The celebrities who have competed in the ninth season of The Masked Singer, pictured in order of elimination (l-r):
Katja Ebstein ("Okapi"), Eva Padberg ("Feuerlöscher"), Jenke von Wilmsdorff ("Marsmaus"), Uwe Ochsenknecht ("Kiwi"), Tim Bendzko ("Klaus Claus"), Mieze Katz ("Troll"), Hendrik Duryn ("Mustang"), Pasquale Aleardi ("Lulatsch"), Jennifer Weist ("Eisprinzessin")

== Episodes ==
=== Week 1 (18 November) ===
Performances on the first live episode
#	Stage name	Song	Identity	Result
1	Eisprinzessin	"Jar of Hearts" by Christina Perri	undisclosed	RISK
2	Feuerlöscher	"The Heat Is On" by Glenn Frey	undisclosed	RISK
3	Mustang	"Eye of the Tiger" by Survivor	undisclosed	WIN
4	Kiwi	"Love Is in the Air" by John Paul Young	undisclosed	WIN
5	Klaus Claus	"Love Runs Out" by OneRepublic	undisclosed	WIN
6	Lulatsch	"I Want You Back" by The Jackson 5	undisclosed	RISK
7	Okapi	"Iko Iko" by Belle Stars	Katja Ebstein	OUT
8	Troll	"The Scientist" by Coldplay	undisclosed	WIN

=== Week 2 (26 November) ===
Performances on the second live episode
#	Stage name	Song	Identity	Result
1	Kiwi	"She's Like the Wind" by Patrick Swayze	undisclosed	WIN
2	Feuerlöscher	"I Love It" by Icona Pop	Eva Padberg	OUT
3	Troll	"Adiemus" by Adiemus / "No Limits" by 2 Unlimited	undisclosed	WIN
4	Lulatsch	"U Can't Touch This" by MC Hammer	undisclosed	RISK
5	Mustang	"I Still Haven't Found What I'm Looking For" by U2	undisclosed	RISK
6	Klaus Claus	"It Wasn't Me" by Shaggy	undisclosed	WIN
7	Marsmaus	"Uptown Funk" by Bruno Mars	undisclosed	RISK
8	Eisprinzessin	"Unstoppable" by Sia	undisclosed	WIN

=== Week 3 (2 December) ===
- Guest Performances Alien (season 3): "The Sound of Silence" by Simon & Garfunkel

Performances on the third live episode
#	Stage name	Song		Identity	Result
1	Eisprinzessin	"Do You Want to Build a Snowman?" from Frozen	"Love Again" by Dua Lipa	undisclosed	RISK
2	Klaus Claus	"Run Rudolph Run"/"Johnny B. Goode" by Chuck Berry	"Love Again" by Dua Lipa	undisclosed	WIN
3	Marsmaus	"Let Me Entertain You" by Robbie Williams	"Tearin' Up My Heart" by NSYNC/"Jingle Bells" by James Lord Pierpont	Jenke von Wilmsdorff	OUT
4	Lulatsch	"Se Bastasse Una Canzone" by Eros Ramazzotti	"Tearin' Up My Heart" by NSYNC/"Jingle Bells" by James Lord Pierpont	undisclosed	WIN
5	Mustang	"Whatever It Takes" by Imagine Dragons	"Tearin' Up My Heart" by NSYNC/"Jingle Bells" by James Lord Pierpont	undisclosed	RISK
6	Kiwi	"Danger Zone" by Kenny Loggins	"Count On Me" by Bruno Mars	undisclosed	RISK
7	Troll	"History Repeating" by Propellerheads	"Count On Me" by Bruno Mars	undisclosed	WIN

=== Week 4 (9 December) ===
Performances on the fourth live episode
#	Stage name	Song		Identity	Result
1	Klaus Claus	"Mercy" by Shawn Mendes	"Falling Slowly" by Glen Hansard & Markéta Irglová	undisclosed	WIN
2	Troll	"When Love Takes Over" by David Guetta feat. Kelly Rowland	"Falling Slowly" by Glen Hansard & Markéta Irglová	undisclosed	RISK
3	Kiwi	"Rebel Yell" by Billy Idol	"All Summer Long" by Kid Rock / "Sweet Home Alabama" by Lynyrd Skynyrd	Uwe Ochsenknecht	OUT
4	Mustang	"Ain't That a Kick in the Head?" by Dean Martin	"All Summer Long" by Kid Rock / "Sweet Home Alabama" by Lynyrd Skynyrd	undisclosed	WIN
5	Lulatsch	"Ich liebe das Leben" by Vicky Leandros	"Somethin' Stupid" by Nancy Sinatra & Frank Sinatra	undisclosed	RISK
6	Eisprinzessin	"Euphoria" by Loreen	"Somethin' Stupid" by Nancy Sinatra & Frank Sinatra	undisclosed	WIN

=== Week 5 (16 December) – Semi-final ===
Performances on the fifth live episode
#	Stage name	Song	Identity	Result
1	Klaus Claus	"Stronger (What Doesn't Kill You)" by Kelly Clarkson	undisclosed	RISK
2	Lulatsch	"Blue (Da Ba Dee)" by Eiffel 65 / "I'm Good (Blue)" by David Guetta & Bebe Rexha	undisclosed	RISK
3	Eisprinzessin	"Hallelujah" by Leonard Cohen	undisclosed	WIN
4	Mustang	"Footloose" by Kenny Loggins	undisclosed	RISK
5	Troll	"Hijo de la Luna" by Mecano	undisclosed	WIN
Sing-off details			Identity	Result
1	Klaus Claus	"Let It Snow! Let It Snow! Let It Snow!" by Frank Sinatra	Tim Bendzko	OUT
2	Lulatsch	"With a Little Help from My Friends" by Joe Cocker	undisclosed	SAFE
3	Mustang	"Paradise City" by Guns N' Roses / "Driving Home for Christmas" by Chris Rea	undisclosed	SAFE

=== Week 6 (23 December) - Final ===
- Group number: "All I Want for Christmas Is You" by Mariah Carey

==== Round One ====
Performances on the final live episode – Round one
#	Stage name	Song	Identity	Result
1	Lulatsch	"Celebration" by Kool & the Gang	undisclosed	SAFE
2	Eisprinzessin	"Hero" by Mariah Carey	undisclosed	SAFE
3	Troll	"Rolling in the Deep" by Adele	Mieze Katz	OUT
4	Mustang	"Skin" by Rag'n'Bone Man	undisclosed	SAFE

==== Round Two ====
Performances on the final live episode – round two
#	Stage name	Song with (Schuhschnabel) Luca Hänni	Identity	Result
1	Lulatsch	"Carol of the Bells"/"That's Amore" by Dean Martin	undisclosed	SAFE
2	Eisprinzessin	"Underneath the Tree" by Kelly Clarkson	undisclosed	SAFE
3	Mustang	"Thank God It's Christmas" by Queen	Hendrik Duryn	THIRD

==== Round Three ====
Performances on the final live episode – round three
#	Stage name	Song	Identity	Result
1	Lulatsch	"Se Bastasse Una Canzone" by Eros Ramazzotti	Pasquale Aleardi	RUNNER-UP
2	Eisprinzessin	"Euphoria" by Loreen	Jennifer Weist	WINNER

== Reception ==
=== Ratings ===
Episode	Original airdate	Timeslot	Viewers (in millions)		Share (in %)		Source
Episode	Original airdate	Timeslot	Household	Adults 14-49	Household ???	Adults 14-49	Source
1	18 November 2023	Saturday 8:15 pm	1.79	0.73	7.1	13.0	
2	26 November 2023	Sunday 8:15 pm	1.70	0.73	6.7	12.2	
3	2 December 2023	Saturday 8:15 pm	1.57	0.65	6.7	13.0	
4	9 December 2023	Saturday 8:15 pm	1.59	0.61	6.8	11.9	
5	16 December 2023	Saturday 8:15 pm	1.53	0.64	6.5	13.2	
6	23 December 2023	Saturday 8:15 pm	1.68	0.69	7.0	13.6	
Average			1.64	0.68	6.8	12.8	
