= Like Lovers Do (Madeline Juno song) =

Single by Madeline Juno

from the album The Unknown
- Released: 28 February 2014
- Genre: Pop
- Length: 3:11
- Label: Polydor
- Songwriters: Madeline Juno; Dave Roth
- Producers: Patrick Benzner; Roth

Madeline Juno singles chronology
"Error" (2013)	"Like Lovers Do" (2014)	"Stupid Girl" (2016)

"Like Lovers Do" is a song by German singer-songwriter Madeline Juno, released on 28 February 2014 as the second single from her debut studio album The Unknown. It was featured in the film Pompeii (2014) and Unser Song für Dänemark, the German national selection for the Eurovision Song Contest 2014.

== Background ==
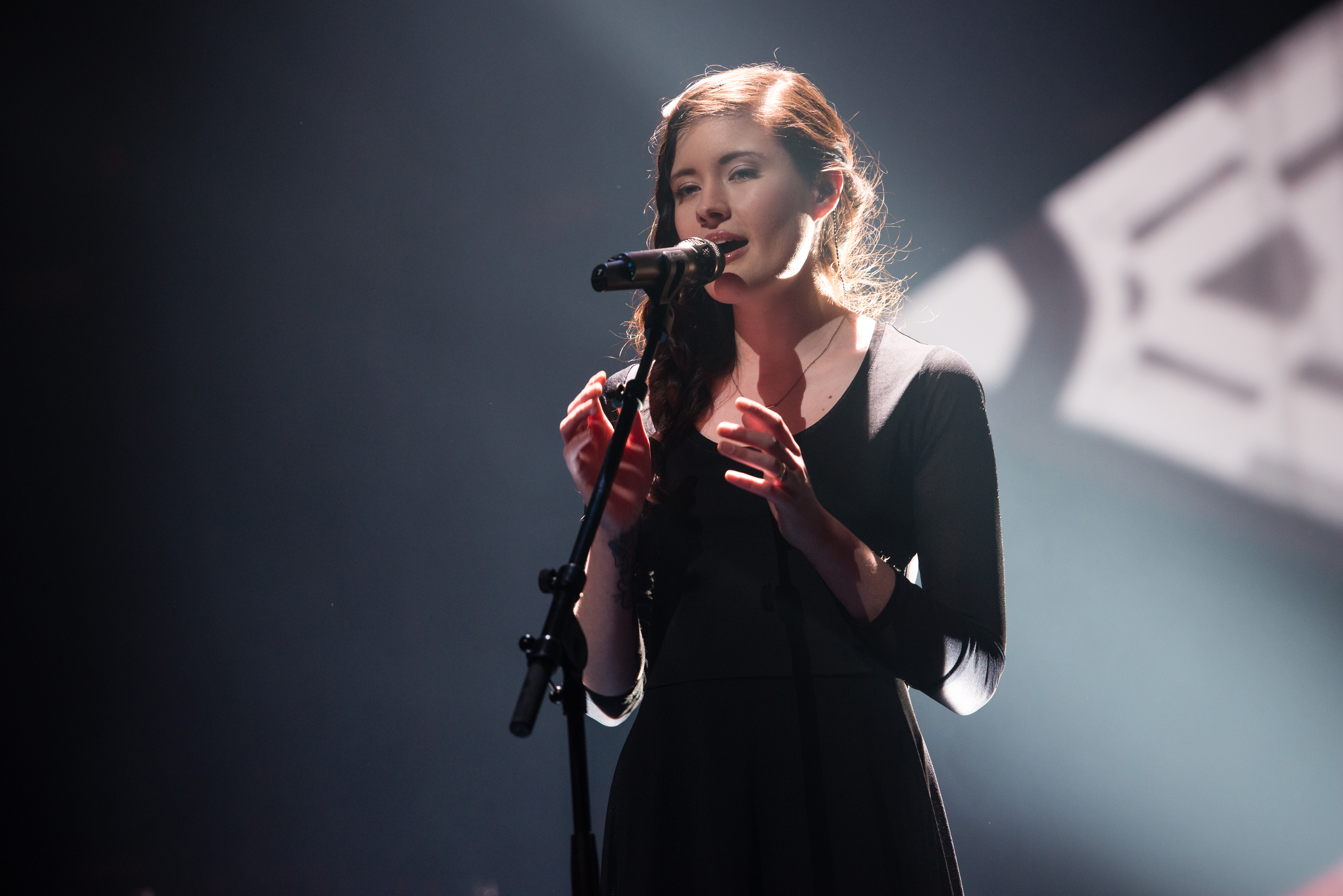
Madeline Juno performing "Like Lovers Do" on Unser Song für Dänemark

"Like Lovers Do" was written by the German composers Madeline Juno and Dave Roth, and produced by Patrick Benzner and Dave Roth. The cover, which is completely in black and white, was published on January 17, 2014 on Juno's Facebook page. The Single was released on February 28, 2014 in Germany, Austria and Switzerland. A teaser of the song was released January 23, 2014 on SoundCloud.

During an interview Juno stated that her favourite song is "Like Lovers Do". The song was finished in November 2013 as one of the last of the album. Like Lovers Do is about the hope to find a new love. It stands for a new beginning in contrast to the dark theme of Juno's previous single Error.

Madeline Juno performed "Like Lovers Do" at the German national finals for the Eurovision Song Contest on March 13, 2014 but she did not make it to the second round.

== Music video ==
The first music video of "Like Lovers Do" was filmed on January 29, 2014 at the Semperoper in Dresden and was released on February 14, 2014. This video shows Juno in a black dress in the Semperoper and contains some scenes of the film Pompeii.

The official music video of "Like Lovers Do" was filmed along with the other version in Dresden and was released on March 5, 2014. It was directed by Carina Steinmetz. In the video, Juno wakes up beneath her boyfriend and leaves the house while he is still asleep. Then she walks around while having some flashbacks of their relationship and decides to go back. In the end, both meet in front of the door.

== Charts ==
Chart	Peak position
Germany	96
