= Error (song) =

Single by Madeline Juno

from the album The Unknown
- A-side: "Error"
- B-side: "Second Time Around"
- Released: November 1, 2013
- Genre: Pop
- Length: 3:55
- Label: Polydor
- Songwriters: David Jost; Madeline Juno; Dave Roth
- Producer: Dave Roth

Madeline Juno singles chronology
"Error" (2013)	"Like Lovers Do" (2014)

Error is the debut single of German singer-songwriter Madeline Juno from her album The Unknown, and is part of the soundtracks of the movies Fack ju Göhte and Pompeii. It competed in Unser Song für Dänemark, the German national selection for the Eurovision Song Contest 2014.

== Background ==
"Error" was written by the German composers David Jost, Madeline Juno and Dave Roth and produced by Dave Roth. The cover, which is completely in black and white, shows Madline Juno scratching a transparent wall.

== Release and promotion ==
The single was released on 1 November 2013 in Germany, Austria and Switzerland. Error is available as a single track, maxi single and as EP single. The EP single contains three remixes and an acoustic version of "Error" and the song "Second Time Around" as B side. The EP additionally contains the music video. Juno performed the song live in the television show Verstehen Sie Spaß?. and in the late night show SWR3 latenight, and in the NDR Talk Show.

== Composition ==
Lyrics and music were written by David Jost, Madeline Juno and Dave Roth. "Error" is described as pop music. In the song, Madeline Juno deals with her heartache. She wrote the song at a time when she did not understand the world. She did not know where to go or what to do next as everything seemed to be confusing for her.

== Music video ==
Two months before the release of the single, a teaser to the song was released on Juno's YouTube channel on 10 September 2013 and the music video was released on 14 September 2013. The whole video is in black and white and shows Madeline Juno's face the whole time. The video is 3:53 minutes long and was directed by Paddy Kroetz. On 22 November 2013 Juno released a Fack ju Göhte version of the video which is in color and incorporates some scenes of the movie. That version was directed by Bora Dağtekin. On 28 November 2013, a lyric video of "Error" was released. It contains animated drawings made by Juno herself. That video was produced by Klaus Sahm.

== Charts ==
Chart	Peak position
Germany	50
