= Jennifer Weist (singer) =

German singer, television presenter, and author

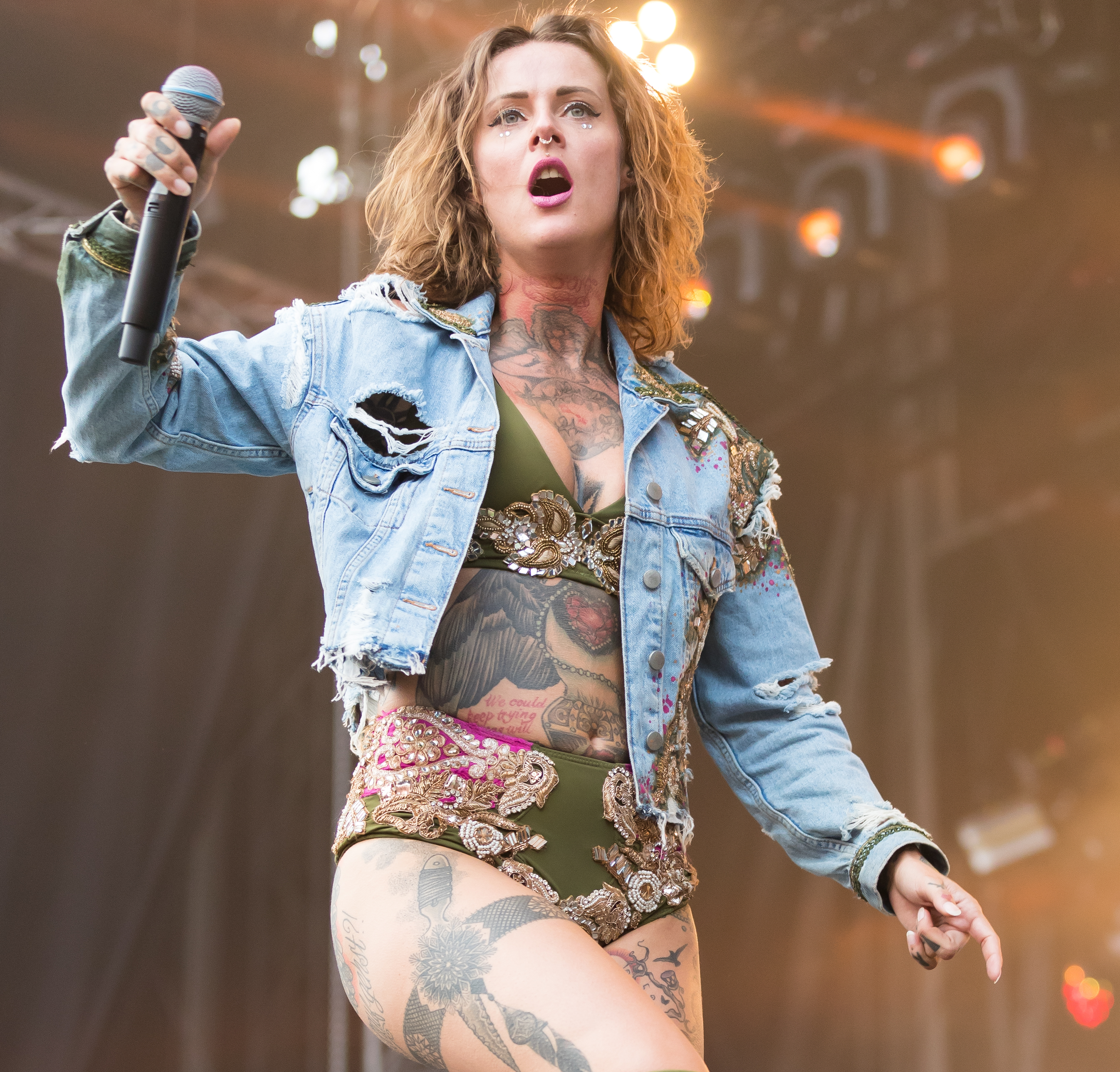
- Jennifer Weist (2017)

Background information
- Also known as: Yaenniver
- Born: Jennifer Weist; December 3, 1986 (age 39); Wolgast, Germany
- Genres: Pop music
- Occupations: Musician, Singer, Songwriter, Television, presenter, Author
- Instrument: Vocals
- Years active: 2000s–present
- Formerly of: Frontwoman of Jennifer Rostock
- Website: jenniferweist.de

Jennifer Weist (born December 3, 1986, in Wolgast) is a German singer, television presenter and author. She was the lead singer of the band Jennifer Rostock and has also pursued a solo career under the name Yaenniver.

== Biography ==
Jennifer Weist grew up in Zinnowitz on the island of Usedom, in the Baltic Sea. She completed her education up to the Abitur.

Weist was the target of harassment due to her liberal-left political engagement and her negative statements about the Alternative for Germany party. She and her family received death threats after the attackers obtained their address and mobile phone number, forcing Weist to relocate.

== Career ==
=== Music ===
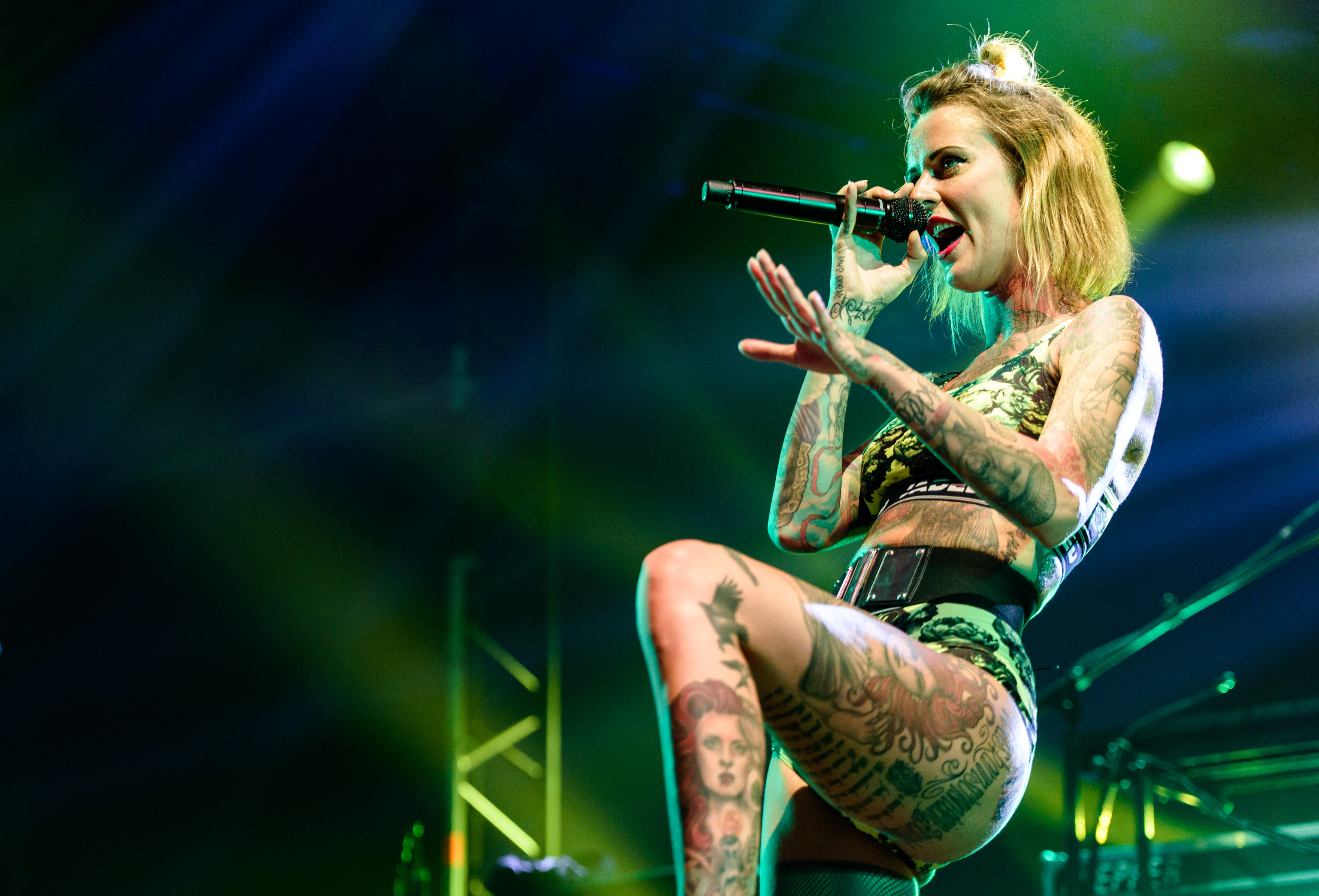
Jennifer Rostock Live 2015

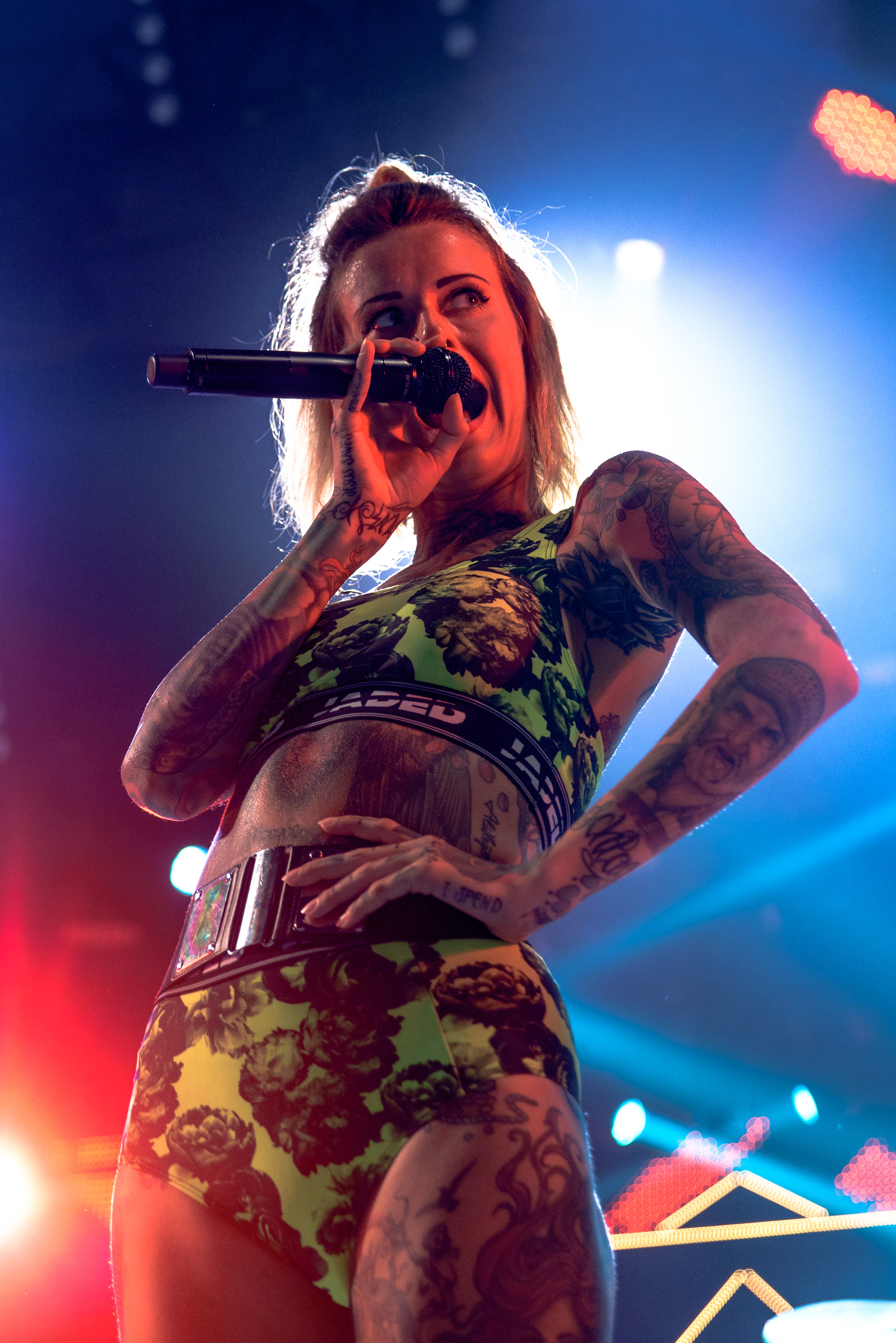
Jennifer Weist Live in Munich 2015

At the age of 13, Weist played in a band for the first time, called No Fame, founded by Johannes Walter. She and Walter had known each other since kindergarten. Walter approached her during a karaoke contest because he was looking for a singer for his band. In 2004, she founded the band Aerials. After finishing her Abitur, both she and Walter moved to Berlin, where they met Alex Voigt, Christoph Deckert, and Christopher Kohl. Together, they formed the band Jennifer Rostock.

The band signed a contract with Warner Music and released their first album, Ins offene Messer, in 2008. They participated in the Bundesvision Song Contest, where the band finished fifth. The band toured nationally as well as in Austria and Switzerland. The second album, Der Film, was released in July 2009. In September 2011, the band participated again in the Bundesvision Song Contest. The third album, Mit Haut und Haar, was released in July 2011. In January 2014, the fourth studio album was released under the title Schlaflos. The album Genau in diesem Ton was released in September 2016. The band's sixth studio album, Worst of Jennifer Rostock, followed in 2017. The band then announced a break in their joint activities. Weist was part of Peter Maffay's MTV Unplugged concert, performing a duet version of the song Leuchtturm. The album reached number one on the German charts in 2017. The same happened with Udo Lindenberg's song Gegen die Strom in 2018.

=== Television ===
In January 2010, Weist participated in Das perfekte Dinner.

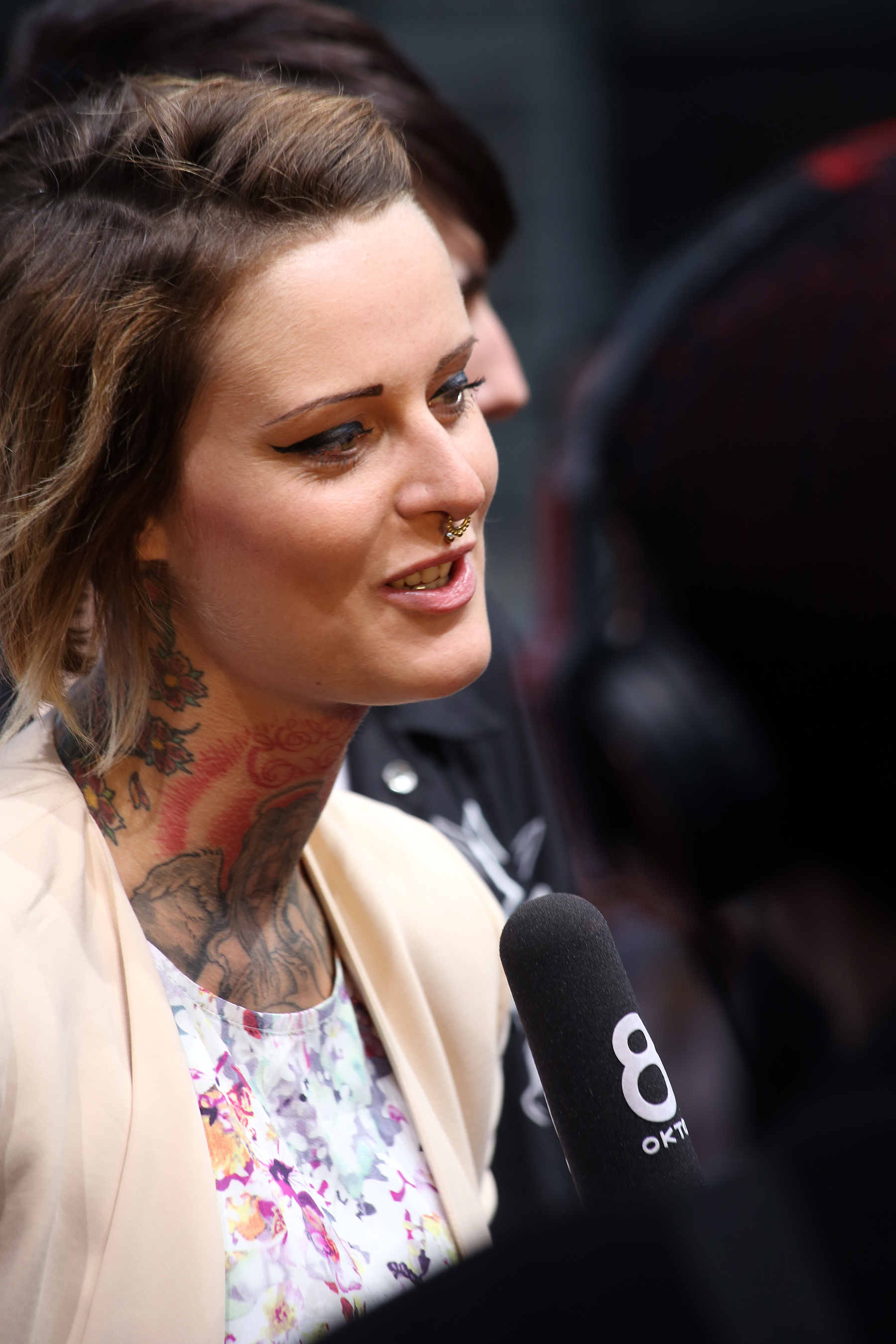
Jennifer Weist (2014)

In 2014, Weist was part of the German expert jury for the Eurovision Song Contest 2014, alongside rapper Sido, singers Madeline Juno and Andreas Bourani, and music director Konrad Sommermeyer. Retrospectively, the entire jury was criticized, suspected of trying to harm Conchita Wurst by giving her the worst scores. Weist placed the performance in ninth place, giving her the best score among the jury members.

Weist hosted the weekly program Update Deluxe on Deluxe Music, the first hosted show on the channel since its creation in 2005, from December 2014 to September 2020.

In 2018, Weist was part of the jury for X Factor alongside Sido, Iggy Uriarte (Lions Head), and Thomas Anders. The show was broadcast on Sky1.

On June 9, 2023, Weist appeared on Music Impossible and performed her song Hengstin in the pop style of her opponent Sarah Engels. At the end of 2023, Weist participated in the ninth season of ProSieben's The Masked Singer as the Ice Princess and won the title.

== Author ==
On 13 May 2025, Jennifer Weist published her first book, an autobiography titled Nackt: Mein Leben zwischen den Zeilen (Naked: My Life Between the Lines).

In her autobiography, Weist openly discusses deeply personal experiences, including her childhood growing up without a father, drug use, experiences with sexual violence, abuse of power, and sexism within the music industry. She also recounts her rise to fame with Jennifer Rostock and her new beginning as a solo artist under the name Yaenniver.
