= Madeline Juno =

German singer-songwriter

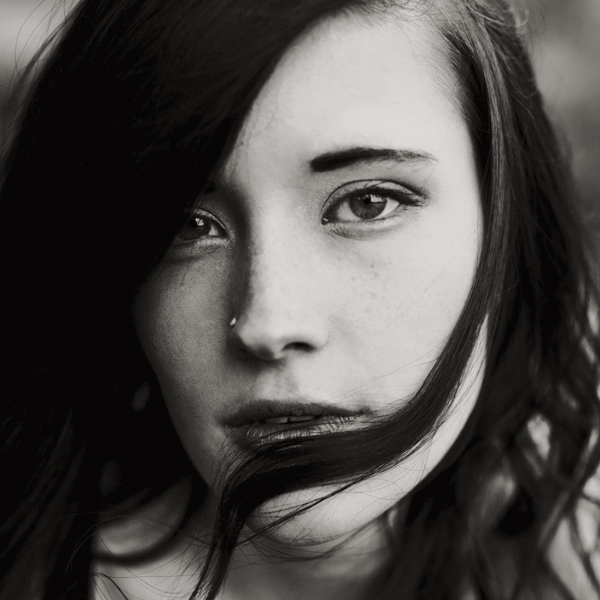
- Madeline Juno in June 2013

Background information
- Born: Madeline Obrigewitsch; 11 August 1995 (age 31)
- Origin: Offenburg, Germany
- Genres: Pop, pop rock
- Instruments: Vocals, piano, guitar
- Years active: 2013–present
- Labels: Embassy of Music, Universal Music Group
- Website: madelinejuno.com

Madeline Obrigewitsch (born 11 August 1995), better known by her stage name Madeline Juno, is a German singer-songwriter. She released her first single "Error" in November 2013.

== Early life ==
Madeline Juno was born on 11 August 1995. Her father is a drummer and her mother is a pianist. She grew up in Offenburg-Griesheim in the Black Forest in Germany. She graduated from Realschule in 2012 and went to Gymnasium in Lahr. When she was 6, Madeline Juno was taught to play piano by her mother. At the age of 12, she started playing guitar and writing her own songs.

== Career ==
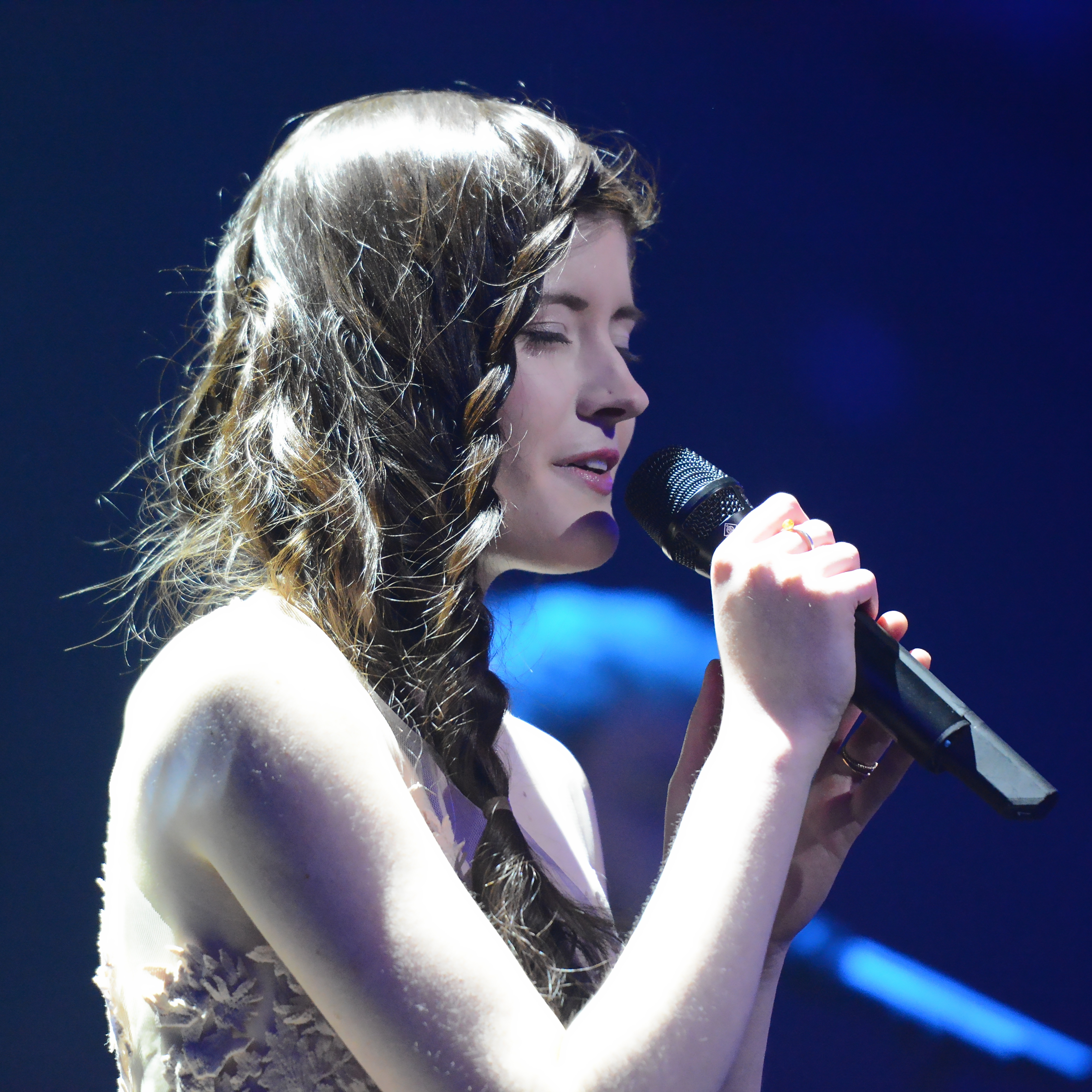
Madeline Juno at Unser Song für Dänemark 2014

Madeline Juno recorded her first songs and uploaded them on YouTube when she was 14. In October 2012, she went on tour with Tom Beck, and in September 2013, she was on tour with Philipp Poisel. In 2013, Juno signed a record deal with Universal Music Group. Juno's first single Error premiered on 14 September 2013 on YouTube. The single was officially released on 1 November 2013. Two weeks after its release, the single entered the German charts at position 63. Her first album, called The Unknown, was originally scheduled to be released in January 2014, but that date was postponed to 7 March 2014. Juno performed her song Error on 23 November 2013 in the television show Verstehen Sie Spaß?. She was one of the eight acts to compete in Unser Song für Dänemark, the German national final for the Eurovision Song Contest 2014 in Denmark. There she performed her song "Like Lovers Do" but she was voted out after the first round. That song is also featured on the soundtrack of the film Pompeii. She was part of the German jury for the final.

On 11 August 2014, which was also her nineteenth birthday, she released a music video for the song "Always This Way".

In 2015 Madeline Juno announced her second studio album, Salvation. Some days later she published the song Into the Night. Her first official single was released on 12 February 2016 and is called Stupid Girl. The album was released two weeks later on 26 February 2016.

On 30 September 2016 Juno released her EP Waldbrand which contains five songs that are all in German language.

In January 2017 she published the song Für Immer as the title track for the movie Wendy – Der Film. A few months later, Juno announced her new studio album DNA to be released on 8 September 2017 which is completely in German language. The first single, Still, was published on 5 May 2017, the second one, Gift, on 28 July 2017.

After touring Juno released her latest single Borderline on 15 June 2018 which is not part of any album yet. The music video was shot in Hong Kong.

== Discography ==
=== Studio albums ===
Title	Album details	Peak chart positions		
Title	Album details	GER	AUT	SWI
The Unknown	Released: 7 March 2014; Label: Polydor (UMG); Formats: CD, digital download	24	—	45
Salvation	Released: 26 February 2016; Label: Embassy of Music (Tonpool); Formats: CD, digital download	35	70	70
DNA	Released: 8 September 2017; Label: Embassy of Music (Tonpool); Formats: CD, digital download	58	—	—
Was bleibt	Released: 6 September 2019; Label: Embassy of Music (Tonpool); Formats: CD, digital download, Boxset	25	—	—
Besser kann ich es nicht erklären	Released: 14 January 2022; Label: Embassy of Music (Tonpool); Formats: CD, digital download	6	—	—
Nur zu Besuch	Released: 26 January 2024; Label: Embassy of Music (Tonpool); Formats: CD, Vinyl, digital download	6	—	—
Anomalie Pt.1	Released: 13 June 2025; Label: Embassy of Music (Tonpool); Formats: CD, Vinyl, digital download	8	—	—

=== Extended plays ===
Title	Album details
Waldbrand	Released: 30 September 2016; Label: Embassy of Music; Format: Digital download
Bevor ich dich vergesse	Released: 9 April 2021; Label: Embassy of Music; Format: Digital download
She Inspired Me	Released: 17 June 2021; Label: Embassy of Music; Format: Digital download

=== Singles ===
Title	Year	Peak chart positions			Album
Title	Year	GER	AUT	SWI	Album
"Error"	2013	50	—	—	The Unknown
"Like Lovers Do"	2014	96	—	—	The Unknown
"Stupid Girl"	2016	—	—	—	Salvation
"You Know What?"	2016	—	—	—	Salvation
"Waldbrand"	2016	—	—	—	Waldbrand
"Für immer"	2017	—	—	—	Wendy – Das Musikalbum zum Kinofilm
"Still"	2017	—	—	—	DNA
"Gift"	2017	—	—	—	DNA
"Halt mich fest"	2017	—	—	—	DNA
"Schatten ohne Licht"	2018	—	—	—	DNA
"Borderline"	2018	—	—	—	Was bleibt
"Gib doch nach"	2019	—	—	—	Was bleibt
"Automatisch"	2019	—	—	—	Was bleibt
"Grund genug"	2019	—	—	—	Was bleibt
"Obsolet" (Note: "Obsolet" was also featured on the EP Bevor ich dich vergesse.)	2020	—	—	—	Besser kann ich es nicht erklären
"Über Dich" (Note: "Über Dich" was also featured on the EP Bevor ich dich vergesse.)	2020	—	—	—	Besser kann ich es nicht erklären
"Lass mich los" (Note: "Lass mich los" was also featured on the EP Bevor ich dich vergesse.)	2021	—	—	—	Besser kann ich es nicht erklären
"Tu was du willst" (Note: "Tu was du willst" was also featured on the EP She Inspired Me.)	2021	—	—	—	Besser kann ich es nicht erklären
"Sommer, Sonne, Depression"	2021	—	—	—	Besser kann ich es nicht erklären
"Nur kurz glücklich" (Note: "Nur kurz glücklich" was also featured on the reissue of Giesinger's album Vier.) (with Max Giesinger)	2021	—	—	—	Besser kann ich es nicht erklären
"November" (featuring Esther Graf)	2021	—	—	—	Besser kann ich es nicht erklären
"Last Christmas"	2021	—	—	—	Non-album single
"Normal fühlen" (featuring Alex Lys)	2022	—	—	—	Besser kann ich es nicht erklären
"Ich sterbe zuerst"	2023	—	—	—	Nur zu Besuch
"Murphy's Law" (Note: Also known as Du tust mir nicht gut :/.)	2023	—	—	—	Nur zu Besuch
"Lovesong"	2023	—	—	—	Nur zu Besuch
"Gewissenlos"	2023	—	—	—	Nur zu Besuch
"Versprich mir du gehst" (featuring 1986zig)	2023	99	—	—	Nur zu Besuch
"Nur zu Besuch"	2023	—	—	—	Nur zu Besuch
"Nicht ich"	2024	—	—	—	Nur zu Besuch
"Was zu verlieren"	2024	—	—	—	Nur zu Besuch
"Reservetank"	2025	—	—	—	Anomalie, Pt.1
"Anomalie"	2025	—	—	—	Anomalie, Pt.1
"Hab ich dir je gesagt"	2025	—	—	—	Anomalie, Pt.1
"Fuck Marry Kill"	2025	—	—	—	Anomalie, Pt.1
"Schlimmster Mensch der Welt"	2025	—	—	—	Anomalie, Pt.1

=== Promotional singles ===
Title	Year	Album
"Into the Night"	2015	Salvation
"Salvation"	2016	Salvation
"No Words"	2017	Salvation
