= Germany in the Eurovision Song Contest 2014 =

- Eurovision Song Contest 2014
- Participating broadcaster: ARD (Note: Arbeitsgemeinschaft der öffentlich-rechtlichen Rundfunkanstalten der Bundesrepublik Deutschland) – Norddeutscher Rundfunk (NDR)
- Country: Germany
- Selection process: Unser Song für Dänemark
- Selection date: 13 March 2014

Competing entry
- Song: "Is It Right"
- Artist: Elaiza
- Songwriters: Elżbieta Steinmetz; Frank Kretschmer; Adam Kesselhaut

Placement
- Final result: 18th, 39 points

Participation chronology

Germany was represented at the Eurovision Song Contest 2014 with the song "Is It Right", written by Elżbieta Steinmetz, Frank Kretschmer and Adam Kesselhaut, and performed by Elaiza. The German entry for the 2014 contest in Copenhagen, Denmark was selected through the national final Unser Song für Dänemark, organised by the German broadcaster ARD in collaboration with Norddeutscher Rundfunk (NDR). The national final took place on 13 March 2014 and featured eight competing acts, one of which was selected through a Club Concert wildcard round. The winner was selected through three rounds of public televoting, and "Is It Right" performed by Elaiza was selected as the German entry for Copenhagen after gaining 55% of the votes in the third round.

As a member of the "Big Five", Germany automatically qualified to compete in the final of the Eurovision Song Contest. Performing in position 12, Germany placed eighteenth out of the 26 participating countries with 39 points.

== Background ==
Prior to the 2014 contest, Germany had participated in the Eurovision Song Contest fifty-seven times since its debut as one of seven countries to take part in 1956. Germany has won the contest on two occasions: in 1982 with the song "Ein bißchen Frieden" performed by Nicole and in 2010 with the song "Satellite" performed by Lena. Germany, to this point, has been noted for having competed in the contest more than any other country; they have competed in every contest since the first edition in 1956 except for the 1996 contest when the nation was eliminated in a pre-contest elimination round. In 2013, the German entry "Glorious" performed by Cascada placed twenty-first out of twenty-six competing songs scoring 18 points.

The German national broadcaster, ARD, broadcasts the event within Germany and delegates the selection of the nation's entry to the regional broadcaster Norddeutscher Rundfunk (NDR). NDR confirmed that Germany would participate in the 2014 Eurovision Song Contest on 4 September 2013. Since 2010, NDR had set up national finals in collaboration with private broadcaster ProSieben to choose either the song and performer or both to compete at Eurovision for Germany, while in 2013, the broadcaster had set up a national final with several artists to choose both the song and performer to compete at Eurovision for Germany. On 6 September 2013, NDR announced that they would again organise a multi-artist national final to select the German entry.

== Before Eurovision ==
=== Unser Song für Dänemark ===
The logo of Unser Song für Dänemark

Unser Song für Dänemark (English: Our Song for Denmark) was the competition that selected Germany's entry for the Eurovision Song Contest 2014. The competition took place on 13 March 2014 at the Lanxess Arena in Cologne, hosted by Barbara Schöneberger with Janin Reinhardt reporting from the green room. Like in the previous four years, the national final was co-produced by the production company Brainpool, which also co-produced the Eurovision Song Contest 2011 in Düsseldorf and the Eurovision Song Contest 2012 in Baku. Eight acts, one of them selected through a wildcard round, competed during the show with the winner being selected through a public televote. The show was broadcast on Das Erste as well as online via the broadcaster's Eurovision Song Contest website eurovision.de and the official Eurovision Song Contest website eurovision.tv.

==== Competing entries ====
Seven competing artists were selected by a panel consisting of representatives of NDR, youth-oriented and pop radio stations of ARD, Brainpool as well as record companies Universal Music, Sony Music, Warner Music Entertainment and other independent labels. The seven participating acts were announced on 13 December 2013, while an additional act was selected through a wildcard round. For the wildcard round, interested performers were able to apply by uploading a performance clip of an original or cover song via YouTube between 25 November 2013 and 22 January 2014. Musician Adel Tawil headed the campaign to encourage artists to apply. By the end of the process, it was announced that 2,240 applications were received and ten performers were selected by the panel. The ten participating artists performed during a Club Concert show that took place on 27 February 2014 at the Edelfettwerk in Hamburg, hosted by Barbara Schöneberger with Janin Reinhardt reporting from the green room and was broadcast on NDR Fernsehen and EinsPlus as well as online via eurovision.de and eurovision.tv. The winner, Elaiza, was selected solely by public televoting, including options for landline and SMS voting, and proceeded to the national final.

Club Concert – 27 February 2014
R/O	Artist	Song (Original artists)	Televote	Place
1	Elaiza	"Is It Right"	23.6%	1
2	Nicole Milik	"I See Fire" (Ed Sheeran)	8.2%	5
3	Simon Glöde	"Blame It on the Boogie"	7.5%	6
4	Melanie Schlüter	"Run" (Snow Patrol)	4.9%	10
5	Cassie Greene	"Not This Time"	6.6%	8
6	Valentina	"Love Is Gone"	7.3%	7
7	Caroline Rose	"Amber Sky"	17.2%	2
8	Max Krumm	"Home"	8.6%	4
9	Ambre Vallet	"Siehst du mich?"	6.3%	9
10	Bartosz	"Walk Away"	9.8%	3

Artist	Song	Songwriter(s)
The Baseballs	"Goodbye Peggy Sue"	Håkan Glänte
The Baseballs	"Mo Hotta Mo Betta"	Vincent "Beatzarre" Stein, Gareth Owen, Konstantin "Djorkaeff" Scherer, Rüdiger Brans, Sebastian Rätzel, Sven Budja
Das Gezeichnete Ich	"Echo"	Henry Funke, Sebastian Budde
Das Gezeichnete Ich	"Weil du da bist"	Henry Funke, Sebastian Budde
Elaiza	"Fight Against Myself"	Elżbieta Steinmetz, Frank Kretschmer, Adam Kesselhaut
Elaiza	"Is It Right"	Elżbieta Steinmetz, Frank Kretschmer, Adam Kesselhaut
Madeline Juno	"Error"	David Jost, Dave Roth, Madeline Juno
Madeline Juno	"Like Lovers Do"	Madeline Juno, Dave Roth
MarieMarie	"Candy Jar"	Marie Scheiblhuber, Anya Weihe, Johannes Vogt, Maximilian Spindler, Alexander Rapp
MarieMarie	"Cotton Candy Hurricane"	Thies Mynther, Marie Scheiblhuber, Juri Kannheiser, Thomas Rainer Berthold
Oceana	"All Night"	Oceana Mahlmann, Sir Darryl Farris, Andre Harris, Joseph "joblaq" Macklin
Oceana	"Thank You"	Joseph "joblaq" Macklin
Santiano	"The Fiddler on the Deck"	Frank Ramond, Mark Nissen, Hartmut Krech, Lukas Hainer
Santiano	"Wir werden niemals untergehen"	Frank Ramond, Mark Nissen, Hartmut Krech, Lukas Hainer
Unheilig	"Als wär's das erste Mal"	Der Graf, Henning Verlage, Markus Tombült
Unheilig	"Wir sind alle wie eins"	Der Graf, Henning Verlage, Markus Tombült

==== Final ====
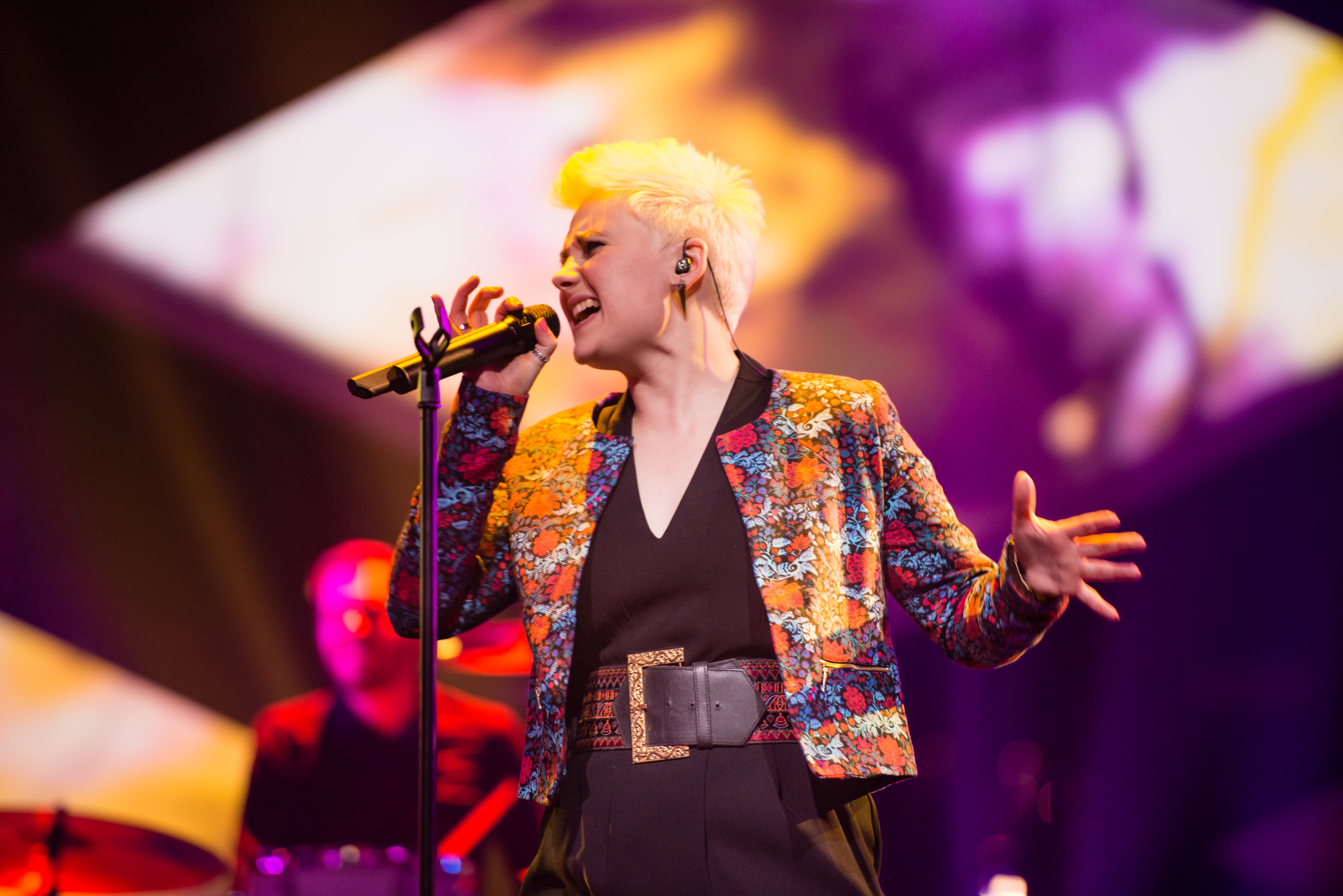
Elaiza performing at Unser Song für Dänemark

The televised final took place on 13 March 2014. The winner was selected through three rounds of public televoting, including options for landline and SMS voting. In the first round of voting, each artist performed their selected first of their two songs and the top four artists were selected to proceed to the second round. In the second round, the four remaining artists performed their second song and the top two artists with one song each were selected to proceed to the final round. In the final round, the winner, "Is It Right" performed by Elaiza, was selected. In addition to the performances of the competing entries, 2013 Danish Eurovision Song Contest winner Emmelie de Forest performed her entry "Only Teardrops", 2014 Italian Eurovision entrant Emma Marrone performed her entry "La mia città" and Adel Tawil performed his new song "Weinen".

First Round – 13 March 2014
R/O	Artist	Song	Result
1	Das Gezeichnete Ich	"Weil du da bist"	—N/a
2	Oceana	"Thank You"	—N/a
3	Santiano	"The Fiddler on the Deck"	Advanced
4	MarieMarie	"Cotton Candy Hurricane"	Advanced
5	The Baseballs	"Mo Hotta Mo Betta"	—N/a
6	Elaiza	"Is It Right"	Advanced
7	Unheilig	"Als wär's das erste Mal"	Advanced
8	Madeline Juno	"Like Lovers Do"	—N/a

Second Round – 13 March 2014
R/O	Artist	Song	Result
1	Santiano	"The Fiddler on the Deck"	—N/a
1	Santiano	"Wir werden niemals untergehen"	—N/a
2	MarieMarie	"Candy Jar"	—N/a
2	MarieMarie	"Cotton Candy Hurricane"	—N/a
3	Elaiza	"Fight Against Myself"	—N/a
3	Elaiza	"Is It Right"	Advanced
4	Unheilig	"Als wär's das erste Mal"	—N/a
4	Unheilig	"Wir sind alle wie eins"	Advanced

Final Round – 13 March 2014
R/O	Artist	Song	Televote	Place
1	Elaiza	"Is It Right"	55%	1
2	Unheilig	"Wir sind alle wie eins"	45%	2

==== Ratings ====
Viewing figures by show
Show	Air date	Viewing figures		Ref.
Show	Air date	Nominal	Share	Ref.
Club Concert	27 February 2014	360,000	6.3%	
Final	13 March 2014	3,950,000	13.3%	

== At Eurovision ==
Elaiza presenting themselves and "Is It Right" at the Eurovision Song Contest 2014

According to Eurovision rules, all nations with the exceptions of the host country and the "Big Five" (France, Germany, Italy, Spain and the United Kingdom) are required to qualify from one of two semi-finals in order to compete for the final; the top ten countries from each semi-final progress to the final. As a member of the "Big Five", Germany automatically qualified to compete in the final on 10 May 2014. In addition to their participation in the final, Germany is also required to broadcast and vote in one of the two semi-finals. This would have been regularly decided via a draw held during the semi-final allocation draw on 20 January 2014, however, prior to the draw, ARD requested of the European Broadcasting Union that Germany be allowed to broadcast and vote in the second semi-final on 8 May 2014, which was approved by the contest's Reference Group.

In Germany, the two semi-finals were broadcast on Phoenix as well as on delay on EinsPlus and Einsfestival, and the final was broadcast on Das Erste. All broadcasts featured commentary by Peter Urban. The final was watched by 8.9 million viewers in Germany, which meant a market share of 34.3 per cent. The German spokesperson, who announced the top 12-point score awarded by the German votes during the final, was Helene Fischer.

=== Final ===
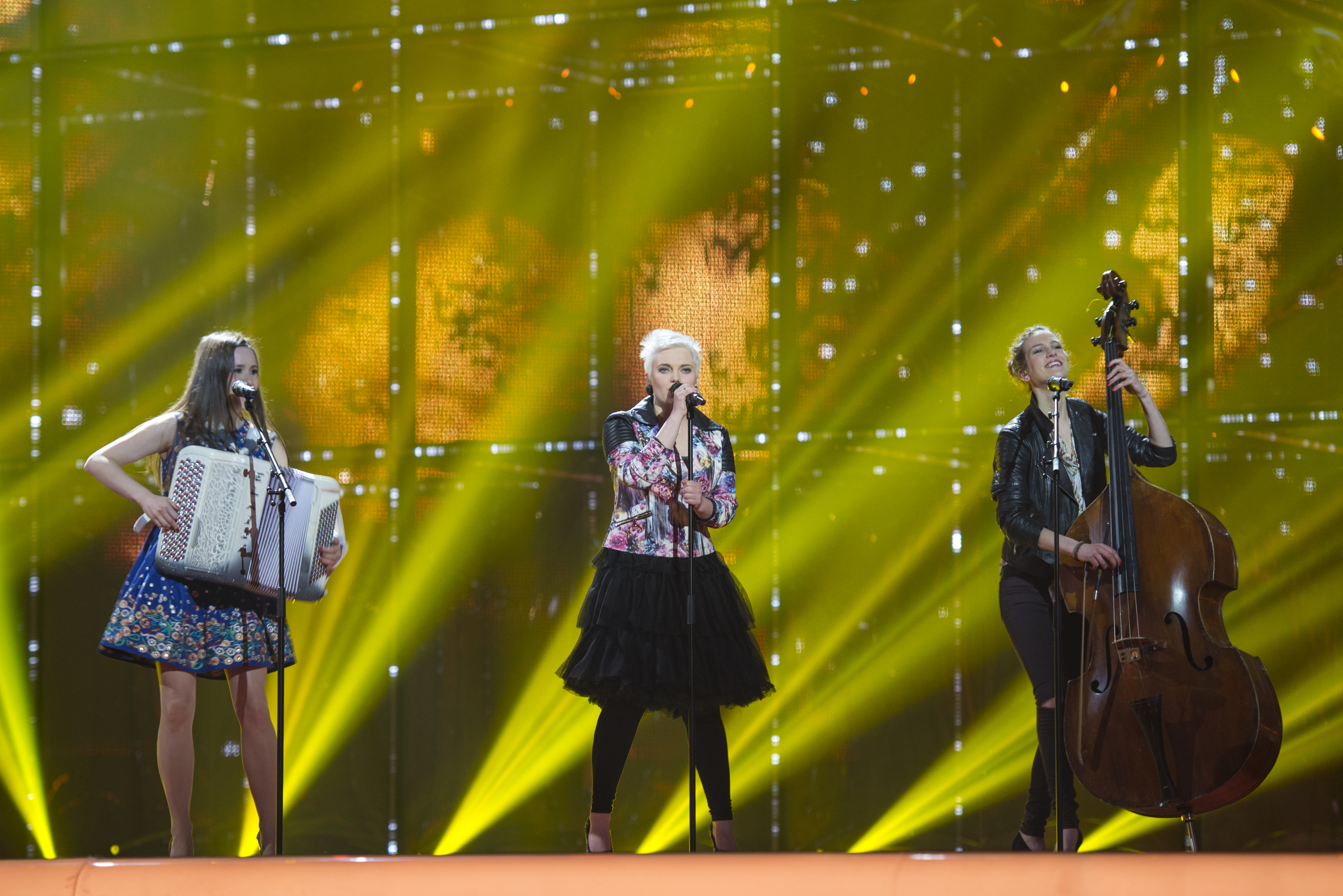
Elaiza during a rehearsal before the final

Elaiza took part in technical rehearsals on 4 and 6 May, followed by dress rehearsals on 9 and 10 May. This included the jury final on 9 May where the professional juries of each country watched and voted on the competing entries. During the German delegation's press conference on 6 May 2014, Elaiza took part in a draw to determine in which half of the final the German entry would be performed. Germany was drawn to compete in the first half of the final. Following the second semi-final, the shows' producers decided upon the running order of the final rather than through another draw, so that similar songs were not placed next to each other. Germany was subsequently placed to perform in position 12, following the entry from Austria and before the entry from Sweden.

The German performance featured the members of Elaiza performing on stage in outfits with flower patterns; Yvonne Grünwald played the accordion, Natalie Plöger played the contrabass and Ela Steinmetz performed vocals. The stage colours were predominately red, purple and yellow with the LED screens displaying the band name and purple tents and the stage floor displaying a chessboard. The staging presentation also included paper streamers dropping onto the stage and covering the band members during the last chorus. Germany placed eighteenth in the final, scoring 39 points.

=== Voting ===
Voting during the three shows consisted of 50 percent public televoting and 50 percent from a jury deliberation. The jury consisted of five music industry professionals who were citizens of the country they represent, with their names published before the contest to ensure transparency. This jury was asked to judge each contestant based on: vocal capacity; the stage performance; the song's composition and originality; and the overall impression by the act. In addition, no member of a national jury could be related in any way to any of the competing acts in such a way that they cannot vote impartially and independently. The individual rankings of each jury member were released shortly after the grand final.

Following the release of the full split voting by the EBU after the conclusion of the competition, it was revealed that Germany had placed twentieth with the public televote and fourteenth with the jury vote in the final. In the public vote, Germany scored 31 points and in the jury vote the nation scored 61 points.

Below is a breakdown of points awarded to Germany and awarded by Germany in the second semi-final and grand final of the contest, and the breakdown of the jury voting and televoting conducted during the two shows:

==== Points awarded to Germany ====
Points awarded to Germany (Final)
Score	Country
12 points	
10 points	
8 points	Poland
7 points	Switzerland
6 points	Armenia
5 points	Georgia; Ukraine
4 points	Albania
3 points	
2 points	Romania; Slovenia
1 point	

==== Points awarded by Germany ====
Points awarded by Germany (Semi-final 2)
Score	Country
12 points	Poland
10 points	Switzerland
8 points	Romania
7 points	Norway
6 points	Greece
5 points	Finland
4 points	Austria
3 points	Malta
2 points	Israel
1 point	Georgia

Points awarded by Germany (Final)
Score	Country
12 points	Netherlands
10 points	Poland
8 points	Denmark
7 points	Austria
6 points	Armenia
5 points	Norway
4 points	Finland
3 points	Switzerland
2 points	Iceland
1 point	Spain

==== Detailed voting results ====
The following members comprised the German jury:

- Jennifer Weist (jury chairperson) – frontwoman for the band Jennifer Rostock
- Madeline Obrigewitsch (Madeline Juno) – singer, songwriter
- Konrad Sommermeyer – talent scout, manager, songwriter
- Paul Würdig (Sido) – rapper
- Andreas Bourani – singer, songwriter

Detailed voting results from Germany (Semi-final 2)
R/O	Country	J. Weist	M. Juno	K. Sommermeyer	Sido	A. Bourani	Jury Rank	Televote Rank	Combined Rank	Points
01	Malta	6	3	15	7	13	8	8	8	3
02	Israel	5	14	8	14	14	11	7	9	2
03	Norway	2	4	3	4	4	3	6	4	7
04	Georgia	4	15	14	1	3	6	13	10	1
05	Poland	3	8	2	3	1	2	2	1	12
06	Austria	12	6	10	15	12	13	1	7	4
07	Lithuania	7	13	7	13	15	12	11	12	
08	Finland	1	1	1	2	2	1	9	6	5
09	Ireland	14	10	11	11	10	15	14	15	
10	Belarus	15	9	9	12	11	14	12	14	
11	Macedonia	11	12	4	10	7	9	15	13	
12	Switzerland	9	2	12	5	6	5	4	2	10
13	Greece	8	7	5	9	8	7	3	5	6
14	Slovenia	13	11	13	8	9	10	10	11	
15	Romania	10	5	6	6	5	4	5	3	8

Detailed voting results from Germany (Final)
R/O	Country	J. Weist	M. Juno	K. Sommermeyer	Sido	A. Bourani	Jury Rank	Televote Rank	Combined Rank	Points
01	Ukraine	20	20	18	14	16	18	14	16	
02	Belarus	24	23	19	20	25	23	21	22	
03	Azerbaijan	10	17	9	15	4	9	25	20	
04	Iceland	19	9	15	16	18	14	8	9	2
05	Norway	4	6	6	3	10	5	9	6	5
06	Romania	12	14	16	21	22	16	17	18	
07	Armenia	5	7	8	4	9	6	6	5	6
08	Montenegro	23	22	21	22	24	24	24	25	
09	Poland	6	4	4	5	3	4	3	2	10
10	Greece	16	21	20	24	19	22	4	14	
11	Austria	9	13	11	13	12	11	1	4	7
12	Germany									
13	Sweden	11	8	5	6	6	7	16	11	
14	France	21	10	17	25	20	20	20	21	
15	Russia	17	16	23	12	21	19	5	12	
16	Italy	22	18	10	17	11	15	18	19	
17	Slovenia	15	24	22	23	14	21	23	23	
18	Finland	3	2	3	7	5	3	12	7	4
19	Spain	7	19	14	10	8	10	13	10	1
20	Switzerland	18	5	12	11	13	12	7	8	3
21	Hungary	14	12	24	19	17	17	15	17	
22	Malta	13	11	13	9	15	13	11	13	
23	Denmark	1	1	1	1	1	1	10	3	8
24	Netherlands	2	3	2	2	2	2	2	1	12
25	San Marino	25	25	25	18	23	25	22	24	
26	United Kingdom	8	15	7	8	7	8	19	15	
