= Greece in the Eurovision Song Contest 2014 =

- Eurovision Song Contest 2014
- Participating broadcaster: New Hellenic Radio, Internet and Television (NERIT)
- Country: Greece
- Selection process: Eurosong 2014 – a MAD show
- Selection date: 11 March 2014

Competing entry
- Song: "Rise Up"
- Artist: Freaky Fortune feat. RiskyKidd
- Songwriters: Nick Raptakis; Theofilos Pouzbouris; Shane Schuller

Placement
- Semi-final result: Qualified (7th, 74 points)
- Final result: 20th, 35 points

Participation chronology

Greece was represented at the Eurovision Song Contest 2014 with the song "Rise Up", written and performed by Freaky Fortune and featuring RiskyKidd. Following the governmental shut down of the Hellenic Broadcasting Corporation (ERT), the European Broadcasting Union (EBU) allowed its temporary successor, Dimosia Tileorasi (DT), to participate in the contest. DT then partnered with the private music channel MAD TV, which produced a four-participant national final titled Eurosong 2014 – a MAD show, to select its entry. On 4 May 2014, two days prior to the contest's first semi-final, New Hellenic Radio, Internet and Television (NERIT) replaced DT as the Greek national broadcaster. NERIT would eventually participate in the contest, thanks to an exception granted by the EBU since it was not yet a member of the union.

To promote the entry, Freaky Fortune and RiskyKidd took part in events in Amsterdam and London and were interviewed by local media. Greece was drawn to compete in the second semi-final of the Eurovision Song Contest, which took place on 8 May 2014. Performing during the show in position 13, "Rise Up" was announced among the top 10 entries of the second semi-final and therefore qualified to compete in the final. It was later revealed that Greece placed 7th out of the 18 participating countries in the semi-final with 74 points. At the final, held two days later, Greece performed in the 10th slot out of the 26 finalists and finished in 20th place with 35 points. This result matched Greece's 1998 entry as the nation's worst placement at the final of a contest.

== Background ==
Prior to the 2014 contest, Greece had participated in the Eurovision Song Contest 34 times since its first entry in 1974. To this point, they won the contest once, in 2005 with the song "My Number One" performed by Helena Paparizou, and placed third three times: in 2001 with the song "Die for You" performed by the duo Antique; in 2004 with "Shake It" performed by Sakis Rouvas; and in 2008 with "Secret Combination" performed by Kalomira. Greece had managed to qualify for the final every year since the introduction of semi-finals in 2004, and between 2004 and 2013, the nation achieved nine top ten placements. Greece's least successful result was in 1998 , when it placed 20th with the song "Mia krifi evaisthisia" by Thalassa, receiving only 12 points in total, all from Cyprus.

Historically, the Hellenic Broadcasting Corporation (ERT), as the European Broadcasting Union (EBU) member in the country, has participated in the Eurovision Song Contest representing Greece. However, in August 2013, the Greek government shut down the radio and television services of ERT, leaving Greece's future participation in question. The EBU allowed the temporary broadcaster Dimosia Tileorasi (DT) to participate in the 2014 contest. DT then partnered with the private music channel MAD TV to select the entry. On 4 May 2014, two days prior to the contest's first semi-final, the new Greek public broadcaster, New Hellenic Radio, Internet and Television (NERIT), was launched. Though not yet an Active Member of the EBU at the time, NERIT was allowed to take part in the contest based on an exception granted by the EBU.

== Before Eurovision ==
=== Eurosong 2014 – a MAD show ===
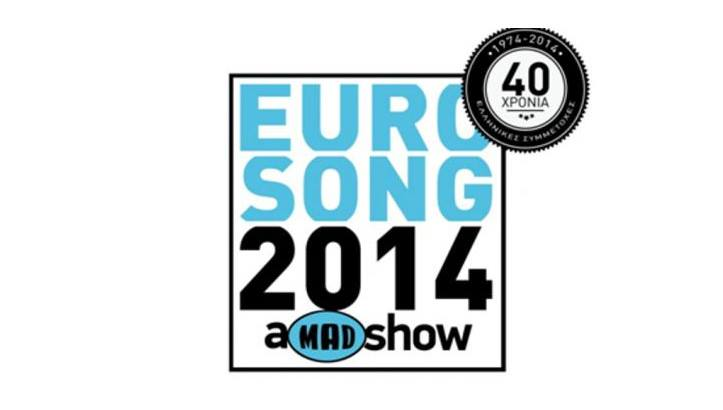
The Eurosong 2014 logo.

Eurosong 2014 – a MAD show was the Greek national final developed by DT to select the Greek entry for the Eurovision Song Contest 2014. Organized and produced by private music channel MAD TV, the competition took place on 11 March 2014 at the Acro Music Hall in Athens and was hosted by Despina Vandi and Giorgos Kapoutzidis. The show was televised on DT as well as online via the DT website hprt.gr and the official Eurovision Song Contest website eurovision.tv. The national final simultaneously celebrated the 40th anniversary of the first Greek participation in the Eurovision Song Contest.

==== Competing entries ====
Four artists, all signed to the record label Panik Records or its imprint Platinum Records, were invited by DT to participate in the national final. The four acts (Crystallia, Freaky Fortune featuring RiskyKidd, Kostas Martakis, and Mark F. Angelo featuring Josephine) were announced on 11 February 2014. Preview videos of the competing songs were presented on 5 March 2014 during a public news program on DT.

Competing entries
Artist	Song	Songwriter(s)
Crystallia	"Petalouda stin Athina" (Πεταλούδα στην Αθήνα)	Nikos Antypas, Aris Davarakis
Freaky Fortune feat. RiskyKidd	"Rise Up"	Nick Raptakis, Theofilos Pouzbouris, Shane Schuller
Kostas Martakis	"Kanenas de me stamata" (Κανένας δε με σταματά)	Elias Kozas
Mark F. Angelo feat. Josephine	"Dancing Night"	Aggelos Makris, Thomas Karlsson, Fast Lane, Josephine Wendel, Melina Makris

==== Final ====
The final took place on 11 March 2014. The four songs competed and the winner, "Rise Up" performed by Freaky Fortune and featuring RiskyKidd, was selected by a 50-50 combination of public voting and jury voting. The jury consisted of the producer Dimitris Kontopoulos, the singer Elpida, the television producer and radio host Themis Georgantas, DT's Public Relations representative Areti Kalesaki, and MAD TV's Head of Public Relations Reggina Kouri. The live performances for all four acts were directed by the choreographer Fokas Evangelinos. The group Freaky Fortune consisted of Greeks Nikolas Raptakis and Theofilos Pouzbouris and the entry featured London-born rapper Shane Schuller, performing under the stage name RiskyKidd.

In addition to the performances of the competing entries, the interval acts celebrated 40 years of Greece's participation in Eurovision, with performances by past representatives as duets with other Greek singers. The entrants from 1977, Paschalis Arvanitidis, Marianna Toli, Robert Williams, and Bessy Argyraki, were paired with Melisses, Elpida (1979) with Tamta, Sophia Vossou (1991) with Demy, Katy Garbi (1993) with Vegas, and Kalomira (2008) with Claydee. Agathonas Iakovidis was also present and performed 2013's "Alcohol Is Free".

Final – 11 March 2014
R/O	Artist	Song	Jury (%)	Televote (%)	Total (%)	Place
1	Crystallia	"Petalouda stin Athina"	12.35	9.72	22.07	3
2	Freaky Fortune feat. RiskyKidd	"Rise Up"	14.51	22.33	36.83	1
3	Kostas Martakis	"Kanenas de me stamata"	13.89	14.20	28.09	2
4	Mark F. Angelo feat. Josephine	"Dancing Night"	9.26	3.75	13.01	4

=== Promotion ===
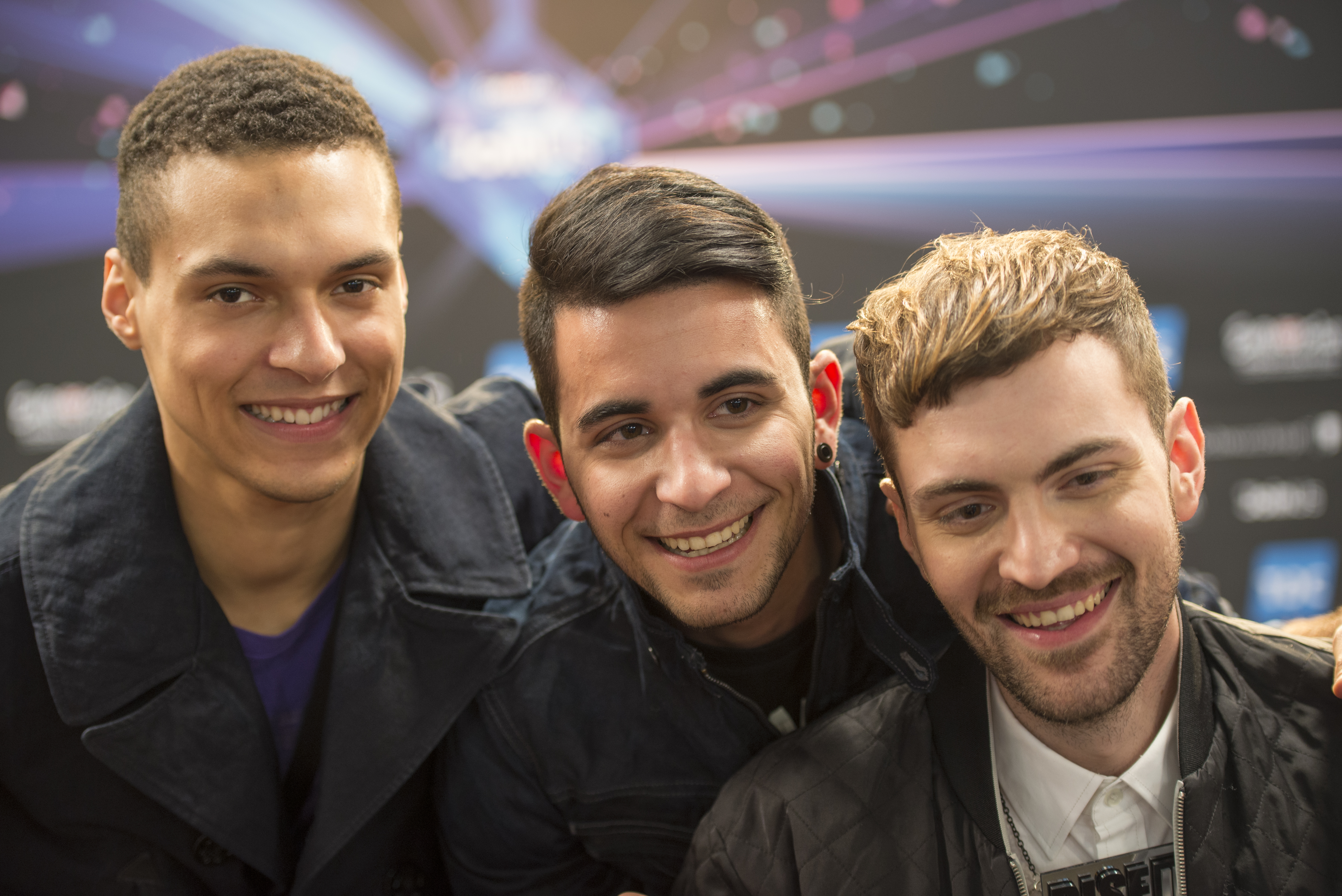
Freaky Fortune (right) and RiskyKidd (left) at a meet and greet event in April 2014.

To promote the entry, Freaky Fortune and Riskykidd appeared on 5 April 2014 in the sixth annual Eurovision in Concert series, an event held at the club Melkweg in Amsterdam, Netherlands, that was staged to serve as a preview party for the year's entries. Later that month on 13 April, they attended and performed at the London Eurovision Party. The group also sought to promote themselves through social media, and had created a medley of Eurovision songs from between 2004 and 2013 that was well-received. An acoustic version of their entry, with the subtitle "Summer Nostalgia Mix", was also released. The end of April saw the group meeting with Ukraine's 2014 entrant Mariya Yaremchuk in Athens where they met with the press together and were interviewed by Alpha TV.

== At Eurovision ==
Freaky Fortune and RiskyKidd presenting themselves during the Eurovision Song Contest 2014.

The Eurovision Song Contest 2014 took place at B&W Hallerne in Copenhagen, Denmark. It consisted of two semi-finals held on 6 and 8 May, respectively, and the final on 10 May 2014. According to the Eurovision rules, all participating countries, except the host nation and the "Big Five", consisting of France, Germany, Italy, Spain and the UK, were required to qualify from one of the two semi-finals to compete for the final; the top 10 countries from each semi-final would proceed to the final. The EBU split up the competing countries into six different pots based on voting patterns from the previous nine contests. On 20 January 2014, an allocation draw was held at Copenhagen City Hall that placed each country into one of the two semi-finals, with Greece being placed into the second half of the second semi-final, to take place on 8 May.

Once all of the competing songs for the Eurovision Song Contest 2014 had been released, the running order for the semi-finals was decided by the producers of the event rather than through another draw. On 24 March, the running order was published, with Greece assigned position 12, following Switzerland and preceding Slovenia. Maria Kozakou and Giorgos Kapoutzidis provided commentary for the television broadcasts. About 2.1 million people watched the final of the contest in Greece, which represented 55.7% of the viewing public. This marked an 11.2% decrease in market share compared to the previous year.

=== Performances ===
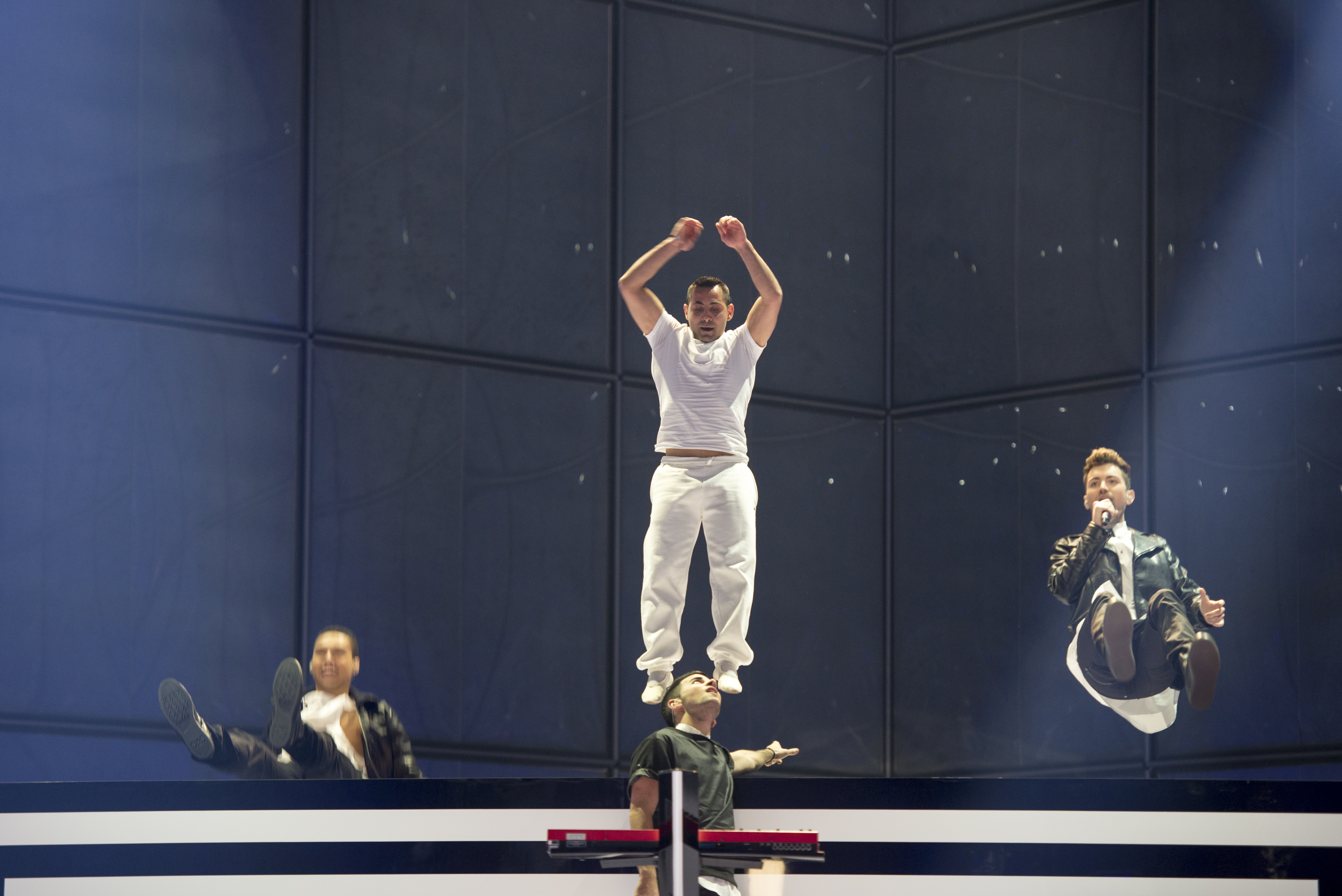
Freaky Fortune and Riskykidd at the second semi-final dress rehearsal.

Freaky Fortune and Riskykidd took part in technical rehearsals on 30 April and 3 May, followed by dress rehearsals on 7 and 8 May. This included the jury final on 7 May, where the professional juries of each country, responsible for 50 percent of each country's vote, watched and voted on the competing entries.

The Greek performance was choreographed by George Papadopoulos, who had previously danced in two prior Greek Eurovision acts himself (2009 and 2012). The performance started with backing dancer Arthour Geremyan in white on a trampoline in the background with Raptakis and Pouzbouris and Riskykidd in the foreground, dressed in black with white shirts underneath. The background of the stage consisted of a large LED screen showing white and blue, representing the colors of Greece. Towards the end of the song, both Raptakis and Riskykidd joined Geremyan on the trampoline and finished the song while jumping to the chorus line "Rise Up". In an interview following the semi-final, the act revealed that they spent two to three months rehearsing and practicing for the performance, trying to not lose their breath while jumping.

At the end of the 8 May second semi-final, the performance had placed seventh with 74 points and Greece was announced as a qualifier to compete in the 10 May final, two days later. During the winner's press conference for the qualifiers, Greece was allocated to compete in the first half of the final. Following a repeat performance, "Rise Up" ultimately placed 20th with 35 points, which equaled Greece's worst-ever placing in the final of the contest. Following the event, Freaky Fortune and RiskyKidd were interviewed by the press and spoke about their experience at the contest where they stated that they did not expect to place 20th. They added that they expected something better based on the positive reception their entry had received leading up to the event.

=== Voting ===
Voting during the three shows involved each country awarded 1–8, 10, and 12 points as determined by a combination of 50% national jury and 50% televoting. Each nation's jury consisted of five music industry professionals who were citizens of the country they represented. This jury judged each entry based on vocal capacity; the stage performance; the song's composition and originality; and the overall impression by the act. In addition, no member of a national jury was permitted to be related in any way to any of the competing acts in such a way that they could not vote impartially and independently. In the second semi-final, Greece placed seventh with 74 points, which included the top 12 points from Belarus. In the final, Greece placed 20th with 35 points, with its highest points awarded being seven by Armenia. The nation awarded its 12 points to eventual contest winner Austria in both the second semi-final and final. Andrianna Maggania was the Greek spokesperson who announced the country's voting results during the shows. The tables below visualise a complete breakdown of points awarded to Greece in both the second semi-final and the final of the Eurovision Song Contest 2014, as well as by the country on both occasions.

==== Points awarded to Greece ====
Points awarded to Greece (Semi-final 2)
Score	Country
12 points	Belarus
10 points	
8 points	Malta
7 points	Romania
6 points	Germany; Israel; Italy; Norway
5 points	
4 points	Finland; Ireland; Switzerland
3 points	Austria; Georgia; Slovenia
2 points	
1 point	Poland; United Kingdom

Points awarded to Greece (Final)
Score	Country
12 points	
10 points	
8 points	
7 points	Armenia
6 points	Belarus
5 points	
4 points	Azerbaijan; Georgia; Russia
3 points	Italy
2 points	Albania; Israel; United Kingdom
1 point	Malta

==== Points awarded by Greece ====
Points awarded by Greece (Semi-final 2)
Score	Country
12 points	Austria
10 points	Romania
8 points	Belarus
7 points	Norway
6 points	Israel
5 points	Switzerland
4 points	Finland
3 points	Poland
2 points	Ireland
1 point	Georgia

Points awarded by Greece (Final)
Score	Country
12 points	Austria
10 points	Russia
8 points	Netherlands
7 points	Armenia
6 points	Hungary
5 points	Ukraine
4 points	Switzerland
3 points	Norway
2 points	Sweden
1 point	Poland

==== Detailed voting results ====
The following members comprised the Greek jury:

- Vasilios Apergis (jury chairperson) – music producer
- Konstantinos Pantzoglou – radio music producer, journalist
- Rodanthi Papadea – lyricist
- Aggelos Makris (Mark F. Angelo) – music producer, composer
- Maria Sinatsaki – DJ, television presenter

Detailed voting results from Greece (Semi-final 2)
R/O	Country	V. Apergis	K. Pantzoglou	R. Papadea	M. Angelo	M. Sinatsaki	Jury Rank	Televote Rank	Combined Rank	Points
01	Malta	7	7	9	5	10	7	12	11	
02	Israel	9	2	1	2	7	3	9	5	6
03	Norway	4	1	3	1	1	1	10	4	7
04	Georgia	13	8	13	8	8	12	4	10	1
05	Poland	14	14	10	3	3	9	6	8	3
06	Austria	1	4	6	6	2	2	1	1	12
07	Lithuania	8	13	12	12	14	13	13	14	
08	Finland	3	3	5	11	12	6	8	7	4
09	Ireland	5	11	7	4	11	8	7	9	2
10	Belarus	10	6	4	7	4	4	5	3	8
11	Macedonia	2	10	14	13	6	11	14	13	
12	Switzerland	12	9	8	10	5	10	3	6	5
13	Greece									
14	Slovenia	11	12	11	14	13	14	11	12	
15	Romania	6	5	2	9	9	5	2	2	10

Detailed voting results from Greece (Final)
R/O	Country	V. Apergis	K. Pantzoglou	R. Papadea	M. Angelo	M. Sinatsaki	Jury Rank	Televote Rank	Combined Rank	Points
01	Ukraine	16	3	5	4	5	5	10	6	5
02	Belarus	7	16	8	10	8	10	12	11	
03	Azerbaijan	13	9	6	6	9	6	25	17	
04	Iceland	4	10	7	14	22	11	20	15	
05	Norway	9	6	3	2	1	4	14	8	3
06	Romania	21	14	18	24	13	18	9	13	
07	Armenia	17	13	15	8	6	12	1	4	7
08	Montenegro	14	23	24	13	24	21	21	24	
09	Poland	25	15	23	15	7	17	5	10	1
10	Greece									
11	Austria	1	2	4	5	3	1	2	1	12
12	Germany	11	19	20	12	18	16	24	22	
13	Sweden	19	8	16	17	10	14	6	9	2
14	France	22	17	19	16	19	20	19	21	
15	Russia	10	5	2	1	2	3	3	2	10
16	Italy	23	25	22	22	21	25	17	23	
17	Slovenia	20	24	17	23	15	22	23	25	
18	Finland	2	7	9	11	16	7	16	12	
19	Spain	24	20	21	18	23	23	11	18	
20	Switzerland	6	12	13	19	14	13	4	7	4
21	Hungary	5	1	11	20	11	8	7	5	6
22	Malta	8	11	10	7	12	9	22	16	
23	Denmark	15	22	12	25	17	19	18	19	
24	Netherlands	3	4	1	3	4	2	8	3	8
25	San Marino	18	21	25	21	25	24	15	20	
26	United Kingdom	12	18	14	9	20	15	13	14	
