= Agathonas Iakovidis =

Greek singer (1955–2020)

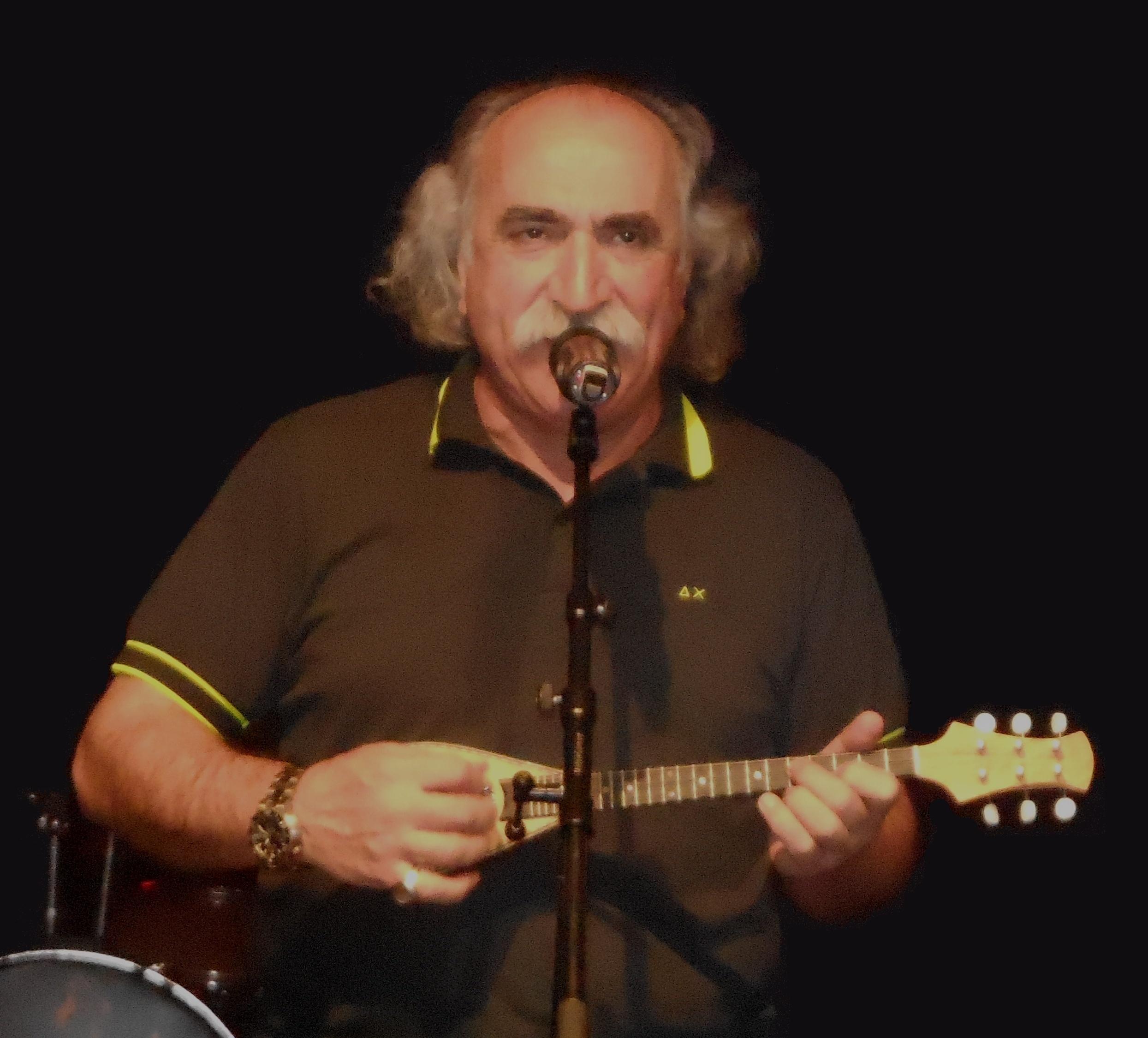
- Agathonas Iakovidis, Eurovision 2013

Background information
- Also known as: Agathonas
- Born: Agathonas Iakovidis; 2 January 1955; Evangelismos, Thessaloniki, Greece
- Died: 5 August 2020 (aged 65) Thessaloniki, Greece
- Genres: Rebetiko, folk
- Occupation: Singer
- Instruments: Vocals, guitar, baglama, baglamas, oud, bouzouki, mandolin, mandola, tzoura
- Years active: 1971–2020
- Website: http://www.agathonas.gr

Agathonas Iakovidis (Greek: Αγάθωνας Ιακωβίδης; 2 January 1955 – 5 August 2020) was a Greek folk singer of rebetiko style. He represented Greece in the Eurovision Song Contest 2013 with Koza Mostra and the song "Alcohol Is Free".

== Life and Career ==
Agathonas Iakovidis was born in Evangelismos in 1955. His parents were refugees from Asia Minor. He was a self-educated student. Agathonas has been involved professionally in music since 1973. After a few years, he released his first album in 1977. By the time Iakovidis died, he had released 5 studio albums and 1 live album.

== Death ==
On 5 August 2020, Iakovidis was found dead in his bed from a heart attack, aged 65.

== Discography ==
=== Singles ===
Year	Title	Peak chart positions	Album
Year	Title	NL	Album
2013	"Alcohol Is Free" (Koza Mostra featuring Agathonas Iakovidis)	95	Non-album single

Preceded by Eleftheria Eleftheriou with "Aphrodisiac"	Greece in the Eurovision Song Contest; 2013 with Koza Mostra	Succeeded by Freaky Fortune featuring RiskyKidd with "Rise Up"
