= Greece in the Eurovision Song Contest 2013 =

- Eurovision Song Contest 2013
- Participating broadcaster: Hellenic Broadcasting Corporation (ERT)
- Country: Greece
- Selection process: Eurosong 2013 – a MAD show
- Selection date: 18 February 2013

Competing entry
- Song: "Alcohol Is Free"
- Artist: Koza Mostra feat. Agathonas Iakovidis
- Songwriters: Elias Kozas; Stathis Pahidis

Placement
- Semi-final result: Qualified (2nd, 121 points)
- Final result: 6th, 152 points

Participation chronology

Greece was represented at the Eurovision Song Contest 2013 with the song "Alcohol Is Free", written by Elias Kozas and Stathis Pahidis, and performed by the band Koza Mostra featuring Agathonas Iakovidis. The Greek participating broadcaster, the Hellenic Broadcasting Corporation (ERT), selected its entry for the contest through a four-participant national final entitled Eurosong 2013 – a MAD show. Due to the budget cuts that ERT was facing at the time, the organisation of the selection process was delegated to a private music channel, MAD TV.

To promote the entry, a music video of "Alcohol Is Free" was released and the song was included in two versions on the band's debut studio album Keep up the Rhythm, which was released prior to the contest taking place. Koza Mostra and Iakovidis also made promotional appearances in England, Belgium, the Netherlands and Germany, performing the song and meeting with local media. Greece took part in the second semi-final of the contest on 16 May 2013 and qualified for the final, placing second with 121 points. At the 18 May final, Koza Mostra and Iakovidis performed "Alcohol Is Free" 21st out of the 26 participants and at the end of voting, the country was awarded sixth place with 152 points.

== Background ==
Prior to the 2013 contest, Greece had participated in the Eurovision Song Contest 33 times since their first entry in 1974. To this point, they won the contest once, in 2005 with the song "My Number One" performed by Helena Paparizou, and placed third three times: in 2001 with the song "Die for You" performed by the duo Antique; in 2004 with "Shake It" performed by Sakis Rouvas; and in 2008 with "Secret Combination" performed by Kalomira. Following the introduction of semi-finals for the 2004 contest, Greece qualified for the final each year. Their least successful result was in 1998 when they placed 20th with the song "Mia krifi evaisthisia" by Thalassa, receiving only 12 points in total, all from Cyprus.

As part of its duties as participating broadcaster, the Hellenic Broadcasting Corporation (ERT) organises the selection of its entry in the Eurovision Song Contest and broadcasts the event in the country. Although its selection techniques have varied over the decades, the most common has been a national final in which various acts compete against each other with pre-selected songs, voted on by a jury, televoters, or both. In most cases, internal selections have been reserved for high-profile acts, with the song either being selected internally or with multiple songs —by one or multiple composers— performed by the artist during a televised final. In 2004, this method was departed from, with the broadcaster using a reality television talent competition format inspired by the Idol series before ultimately selecting the act internally instead.

== Before Eurovision ==
In mid-November 2012, Johnny Kalimeris, executive member of the ERT board, initially confirmed that Greece would take part in the Eurovision Song Contest 2013 despite the ongoing financial problems the nation was facing. Despite this confirmation, the country's participation came into doubt later the same month due to budget cuts the broadcaster had endured, the high costs associated with the contest, and the difficulty those costs would present in finding sponsors to cover the expenses. Additionally, various Greek politicians and government spokesman Simos Kedikoglou suggested that a participation in the 2013 contest would be distasteful during a time that Greeks were enduring drastic economic cuts to keep the economy afloat due to the ongoing financial crisis. Despite the uncertainty, Greece's participation was officially confirmed on 21 December 2012 when the European Broadcasting Union (EBU) released a list of the countries that would participate in the 2013 contest. ERT later stated that its participation was decided taking into consideration the high viewership and popularity of the event, on the condition that the broadcaster would not be burdened financially.

=== Eurosong 2013 – a MAD show ===
Eurosong 2013 – a MAD show was the Greek national final developed by ERT to select the Greek entry for the Eurovision Song Contest 2013. Organized and produced by private music channel MAD TV, the competition took place on 18 February 2013 at the Gazi Music Hall in Athens, hosted by Despina Vandi and Giorgos Kapoutzidis. The show was televised on ET1, ERT World and Cyprus's RIK 1, as well as online via the ERT website ert.gr, YouTube and the official Eurovision Song Contest website eurovision.tv. The national final was watched by 1.04 million viewers in Greece with a 22% viewership rate according to ABG Nielsen Hellas. Prior to the event, on 7 February 2013, ERT and MAD TV launched a special 24/7 channel called Eurovision Channel ERT powered by MAD exclusively on OTE TV. The channel was exclusively devoted to Eurovision coverage and featured clips of songs throughout the history of the Eurovision Song Contest, as well as special Eurovision programs.

==== Competing entries ====
Four artists, all signed to record label Panik Records or its imprint Platinum Records, were invited by ERT to participate in the national final. The four acts: Aggeliki Iliadi, Alex Leon featuring Giorgina, Koza Mostra and Thomai Apergi were announced on 21 January 2013. The competing songs were presented on 6 February 2013 during a press conference held at MAD TV's studio.

Competing artists
| Artist | Song | Songwriter(s) | Label |
|---|---|---|---|
| Aggeliki Iliadi | "Hilies kai mia nihtes" (Χίλιες και μια νύχτες) | Kiriakos Papadopoulos, Elias Filippou | Platinum Records |
| Alex Leon feat. Giorgina | "Angel" | Alex Leon, RiskyKidd | Panik Records |
| Koza Mostra feat. Agathonas Iakovidis | "Alcohol Is Free" | Elias Kozas, Stathis Pahidis | Platinum Records |
| Thomai Apergi | "One Last Kiss" | Giorgos Gekas, Aris Nikolakopoulos | Panik Records |

==== Final ====
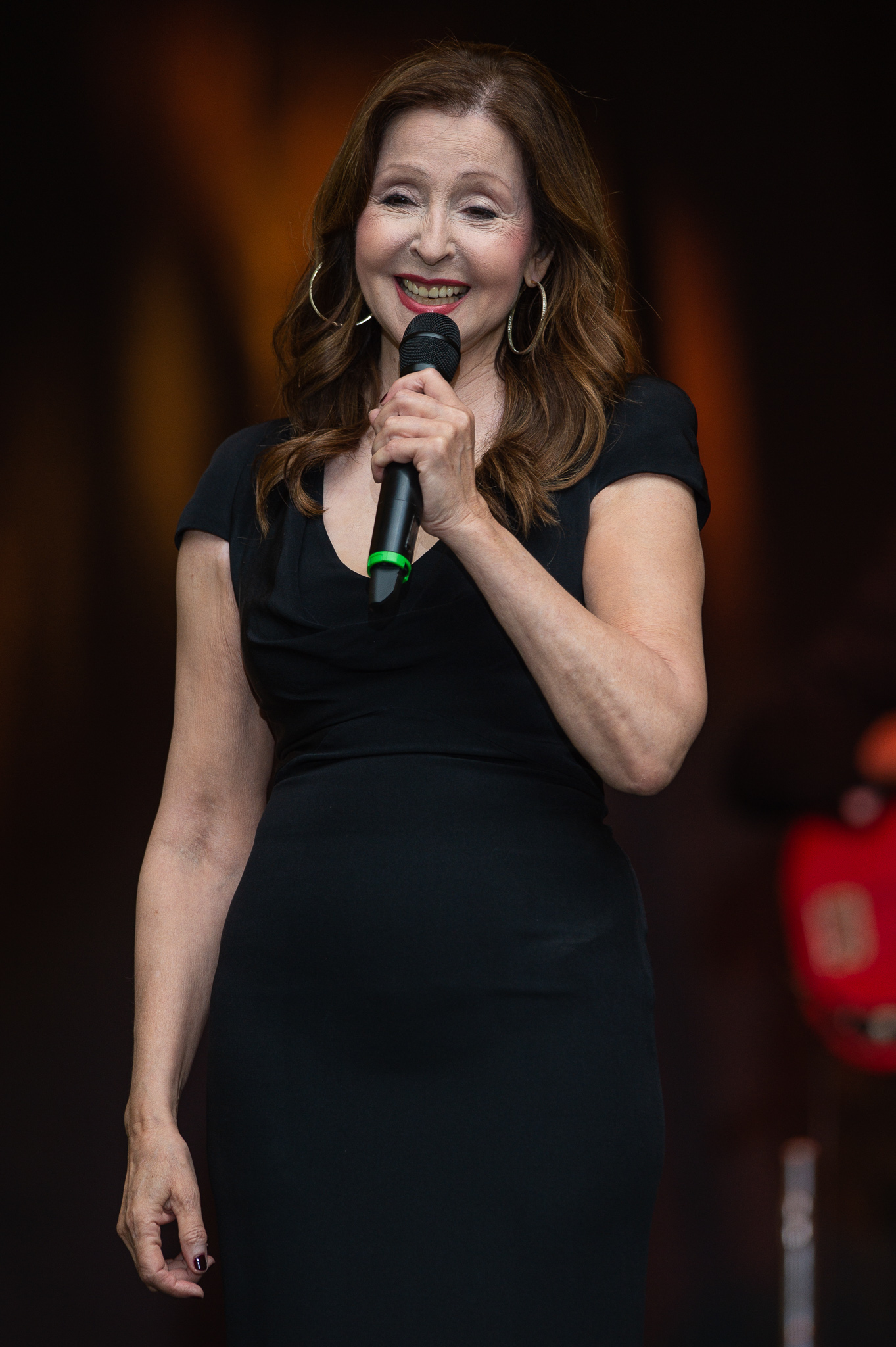
Eurovision Song Contest 1972 winner Vicky Leandros was a member of the jury of Eurosong 2013 – a MAD show.

The final took place on 18 February 2013. Four songs competed and the winner, "Alcohol Is Free" performed by Koza Mostra featuring Agathonas Iakovidis, was selected by a 50/50 combination of public voting and jury voting. The jury consisted of Dimitris Kontopoulos (producer), Andreas Pilarinos (conductor), Marina Lahana (ERT Programming Executive), Reggina Kouri (Head of Public Relations for MAD TV) and Vicky Leandros (singer and Eurovision Song Contest 1972 winner). Public voting was conducted through televote or SMS, with 21,265 telephone votes and 36,881 SMS votes being cast during the show.

The national final featured many past Eurovision winners performing duets with popular Greek singers, including Dima Bilan with Demy, Helena Paparizou with Vegas, Alexander Rybak with Kostas Martakis, Marija Šerifović with Melisses, Ruslana with Eleni Foureira and Leandros with Paparizou. Additionally, Eleftheria Eleftheriou and Ivi Adamou performed a mashup of their 2012 Eurovision entries together. Cypriot Eurovision participant Despina Olympiou also performed her 2013 Eurovision entry "An me thimasai". The national final was broadcast live on television through ET1 in Greece, worldwide on ERT World, RIK in Cyprus, as well as online through the official websites of ERT, the Eurovision Song Contest, and MAD TV's YouTube channel. Additionally, the show was rebroadcast later on Eurovision Channel ERT powered by MAD on OTE TV.

Compared to the previous year, the show was a success receiving both higher viewer ratings and public votes. The show lasted approximately two and a half hours and was the third highest rated show aired on 18 February 2013, with 22% viewership according to AGB Hellas; it is estimated that 1.07 million viewers on average watched the show. It is also estimated that at least 3.3 million viewers tuned in to the show for at least one minute throughout its duration. 58,146 public votes were received, of which 36,881 were via SMS voting and 21,265 via televoting. Koza Mostra and Iakovidis were the overall winners with "Alcohol Is Free", coming first in both the televoting and jury votes. The Greek and English-language song was written by band member Elias Kozas with lyrics by Stathis Pachidis.

Final – 18 February 2013
| R/O | Artist | Song | Jury (%) | Televote (%) | Total (%) | Place |
|---|---|---|---|---|---|---|
| 1 | Thomai Apergi | "One Last Kiss" | 11.51 | 12.03 | 23.54 | 3 |
| 2 | Alex Leon feat. Giorgina | "Angel" | 15.08 | 9.54 | 24.61 | 2 |
| 3 | Koza Mostra feat. Agathonas Iakovidis | "Alcohol Is Free" | 16.27 | 20.45 | 36.72 | 1 |
| 4 | Aggeliki Iliadi | "Hilies kai mia nihtes" (Χίλιες και μια νύχτες) | 7.14 | 7.98 | 15.13 | 4 |

=== Promotion ===
To promote "Alcohol Is Free", Koza Mostra and Iakovidis filmed a music video for the song in early March 2013 in historic locations across Thessaloniki, Greece. Directed by Kiriakos Nochoutidis, the video included fans who were invited to participate in it by the band and was released on 13 March. The song was then included in both the original version and a radio version on Koza Mostra's debut studio album Keep up the Rhythm, which was presented on 22 March 2013 in Thessaloniki. A Facebook page was also created so that fans could follow the act's preparations leading up to the contest.

The town of Grevena in Greece was prominently mentioned in the song as the destination of Koza Mostra and Iakovidis' journey, and as such the Mayor of the city hosted them for a publicity event in their honour. By late March, the band organized a live chat with Eurovision media outlets, being interviewed by ESCToday, Wiwibloggs and eurovision.tv. A promotional tour across Europe saw Koza Mostra and Iakovidis performing in London, Amsterdam, Brussels, and Nuremberg.

== At Eurovision ==
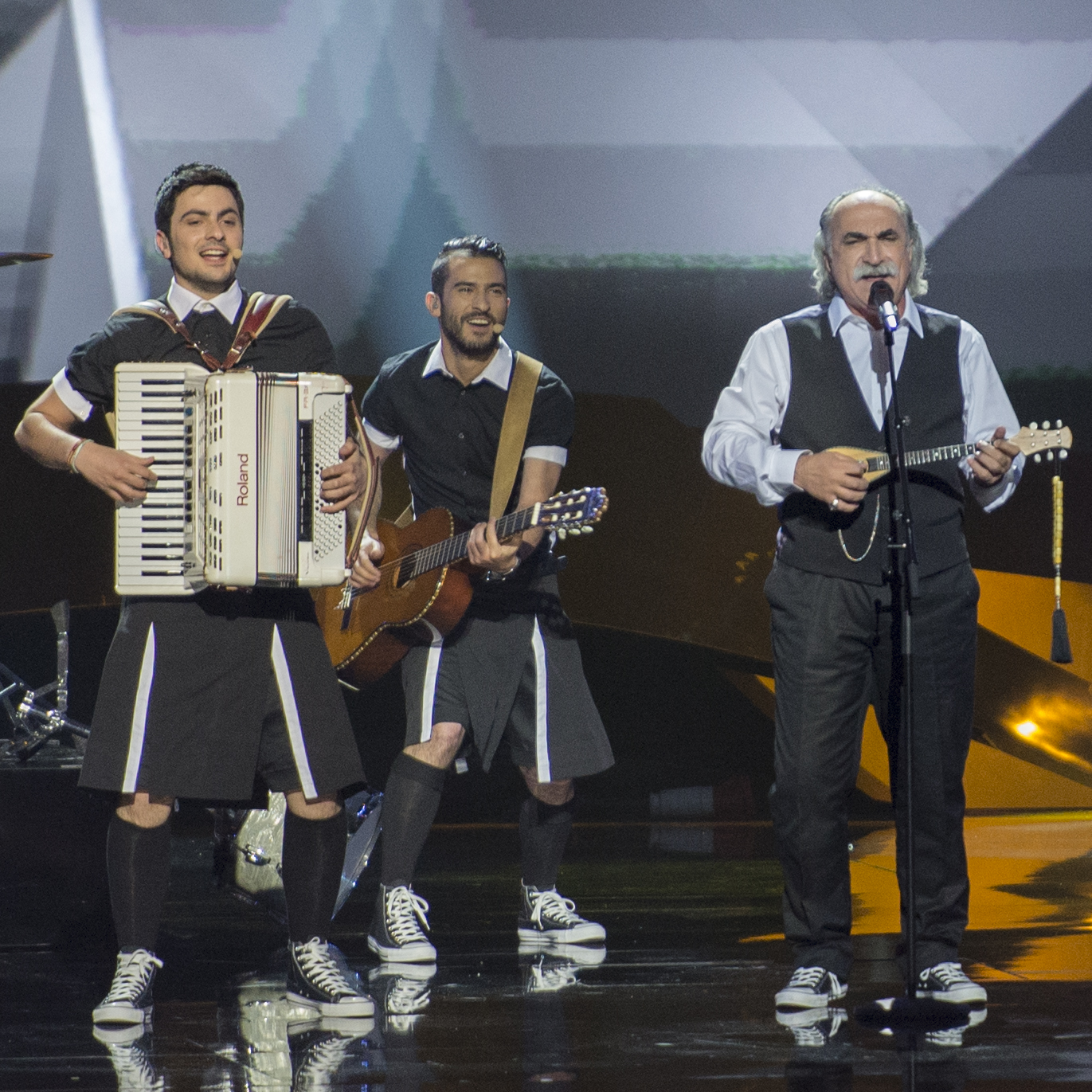
Two members of Koza Mostra with Agathonas Iakovidis performing "Alcohol Is Free" during a dress rehearsal.

The Eurovision Song Contest 2013 took place at the Malmö Arena in Malmö, Sweden. It consisted of two semi-finals held on 14 and 16 May, respectively, and the final on 18 May 2013. According to the Eurovision rules, all participating countries, except the host nation and the "Big Five", consisting of France, Germany, Italy, Spain and the United Kingdom, were required to qualify from one of the two semi-finals to compete for the final; the top 10 countries from the respective semi-finals would proceed to the final.

On 17 January 2013, an allocation draw was held in Malmö that placed each country into one of the two semi-finals and identified which half of the show they would perform in, with Greece being placed into the first half of the second semi-final. Once all of the competing songs for the Eurovision Song Contest had been released, the running order for the semi-finals was decided by the producers of the contest rather than through another draw. On 28 March 2013, the running order was published, with the nation assigned position nine, following Iceland and preceding Israel.

The postcard introducing Koza Mostra and Iakovidis prior to their performance during the contest was filmed by host broadcaster Sveriges Television (SVT) in Thessaloniki, the band's hometown. The first semi-final was televised on NET within Greece, with the second semi-final and the final broadcast on ERT. All three shows were also available on ERT's website, as well as on ERT HD and ERT World. Radio broadcasts of the shows were on First Programme, Second Programme, Voice of Greece, Filia and the 19 regional stations of Hellenic Radio (ERA). Maria Kozakou and Giorgos Kapoutzidis provided commentary for both the television and radio broadcasts.

=== Performances ===
Choreography for the band's stage performance was organised by Maria Lyraraki and Fokas Evangelinos. As the contest only allowed a maximum of six performers on stage, Koza Mostra's bass player Dimitris did not take part in the group's Eurovision performance. Technical rehearsals took place on 9 and 11 May 2013, followed by dress rehearsals on 15 and 16 May. The Greek performance saw the band on stage surrounded by a constantly changing yellow and gray backdrop, with Iakovidis playing the baglamas. Koza Mostra wore black and white clothing, with kilts covering their shorts, a look they routinely could be seen in during past performances.

Greece qualified from the second semi-final, placing second of the 17 performing nations with 121 points. At the second semi-final winners' press conference, Greece was allocated to perform in the second half of the final. In the final, the producers of the show decided that Greece would perform 21st, following Azerbaijan and preceding Ukraine. At the final held two days later, Greece finished in sixth place out of the 26 finalists with 152 points.

=== Voting ===
Voting during the three shows involved each country awarding points from 1-8, 10 and 12 as determined by a combination of 50% national jury and 50% televoting. Each nation's jury consisted of five music industry professionals who are citizens of the country they represent. This jury judged each entry based on: vocal capacity; the stage performance; the song's composition and originality; and the overall impression by the act. In addition, no member of a national jury was permitted to be related in any way to any of the competing acts in such a way that they cannot vote impartially and independently. In the second semi-final, Greece placed second with 121 points, which included the top 12 points from San Marino. In the final, Greece placed sixth with 152 points, which included 12 points from both Cyprus and San Marino. The nation awarded 12 points to Azerbaijan in both the second semi-final and final. Andrianna Maggania was the Greek spokesperson announcing the country's voting results during the shows. The tables below visualise a complete breakdown of points awarded to Greece in both the first semi-final and the final of the Eurovision Song Contest 2013, as well as by the country on both occasions.

==== Points awarded to Greece ====
Points awarded to Greece (Semi-final 2)
| Score | Country |
|---|---|
| 12 points | San Marino |
| 10 points | Albania; Bulgaria; Romania |
| 8 points | Armenia; Germany |
| 7 points | Azerbaijan; Finland; Malta; Norway |
| 6 points | Israel; Macedonia; Switzerland |
| 5 points | Latvia; Spain |
| 4 points | |
| 3 points | Hungary |
| 2 points | Georgia; Iceland |
| 1 point | |

Points awarded to Greece (Final)
| Score | Country |
|---|---|
| 12 points | Cyprus; San Marino |
| 10 points | Albania; Russia |
| 8 points | Armenia; Montenegro; Switzerland; United Kingdom |
| 7 points | Austria; Bulgaria; Italy; Romania |
| 6 points | Belarus; Denmark; Germany |
| 5 points | Croatia; Norway |
| 4 points | Azerbaijan; Macedonia; Malta |
| 3 points | |
| 2 points | Belgium; Israel |
| 1 point | Finland; Hungary; Latvia; Netherlands |

==== Points awarded by Greece ====
Points awarded by Greece (Semi-final 2)
| Score | Country |
|---|---|
| 12 points | Azerbaijan |
| 10 points | Romania |
| 8 points | Albania |
| 7 points | Armenia |
| 6 points | Georgia |
| 5 points | Malta |
| 4 points | Norway |
| 3 points | Switzerland |
| 2 points | Bulgaria |
| 1 point | San Marino |

Points awarded by Greece (Final)
| Score | Country |
|---|---|
| 12 points | Azerbaijan |
| 10 points | Romania |
| 8 points | Ukraine |
| 7 points | Denmark |
| 6 points | Italy |
| 5 points | Georgia |
| 4 points | Norway |
| 3 points | Malta |
| 2 points | Hungary |
| 1 point | Belarus |
