= Freaky Fortune =

Greek musical duo

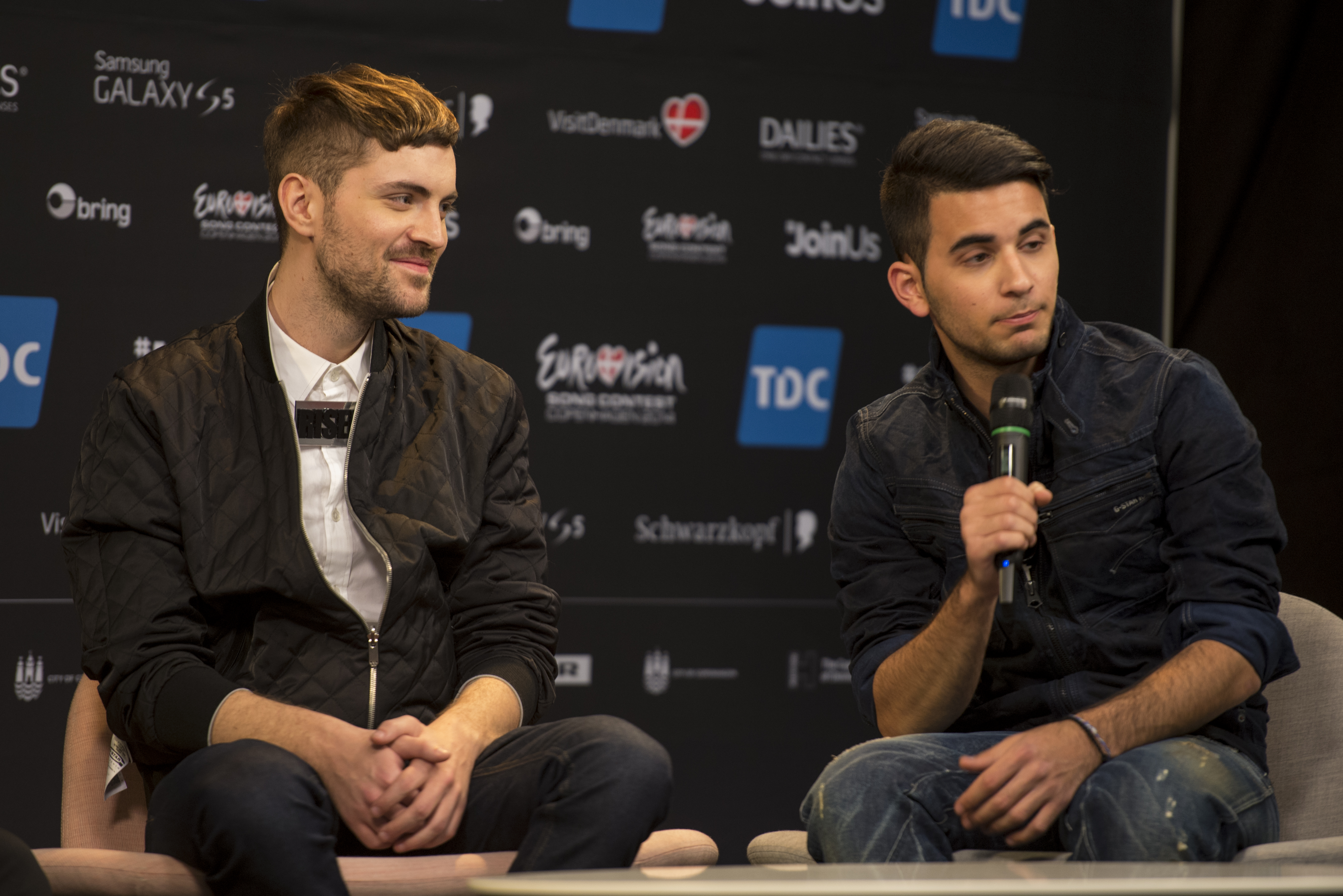
- Freaky Fortune in 2014

Background information
- Origin: Athens, Greece
- Genres: Dance; Pop
- Years active: 2011–2014
- Past members: Nick Raptakis; Theofilos Pouzbouris

Freaky Fortune was a Greek musical duo consisting of vocalist Nicolas "Nick" Raptakis (Greek: Νικόλας Ραπτάκης; born 30 April 1990) and producer Theofilos "Teo" Pouzbouris (Greek: Θεόφιλος Πουζμπούρης; born 9 February 1991). They represented Greece in the Eurovision Song Contest 2014 together with RiskyKidd with the song "Rise Up".

== Career ==
=== 2012–2013: Early beginnings ===
Raptakis and Pouzbouris broke through within the internet community after winning a cover competition organised by blogger Perez Hilton with their cover of the song "Part of Me" (originally by Katy Perry). After their win, they released three singles: "Our Destiny", "Stronger" and "All I Need (This Summer)", with which they had local radio success.

=== 2014: Eurovision Song Contest ===
In 2014, the duo was chosen to represent Greece in the Eurovision Song Contest 2014 along with the rapper RiskyKidd with the song "Rise Up". "Rise Up" came 20th in the final of Eurovision 2014. Their following single "In a World Without You" was released on 25 June 2014, receiving positive reviews from music critics. The song was a collaboration with the Greek DJ Nicolas Costa who also wrote the song, while the production was done by him and Freaky Fortune.

The group split up shortly afterwards.

== Discography ==
=== Singles ===
Title	Year	Peak chart positions					Album
Title	Year	GRE	AUT	IRE	UK	TUR	Album
"Our Destiny"	2012	20	—	—	—	59	Non-album singles
"Stronger"	2013	—	—	—	—	—	Non-album singles
"All I Need (This Summer)"	2013	—	—	—	—	—	Non-album singles
"Rise Up" (featuring RiskyKidd)	2014	4	67	73	110	—	Non-album singles
"In a World Without You" (with Nicolas Costa)	2014	—	—	—	—	—	Non-album singles
"Gi kai ouranos" (Γη και ουρανός)	2014	—	—	—	—	—	Non-album singles
"—" denotes a single that did not chart or was not released.

Preceded by Koza Mostra & Agathonas Iakovidis with "Alcohol Is Free"	Greece in the Eurovision Song Contest; 2014	Succeeded by Maria Elena Kyriakou with "One Last Breath"
