= Josephine (singer) =

Greek singer (born 1990)

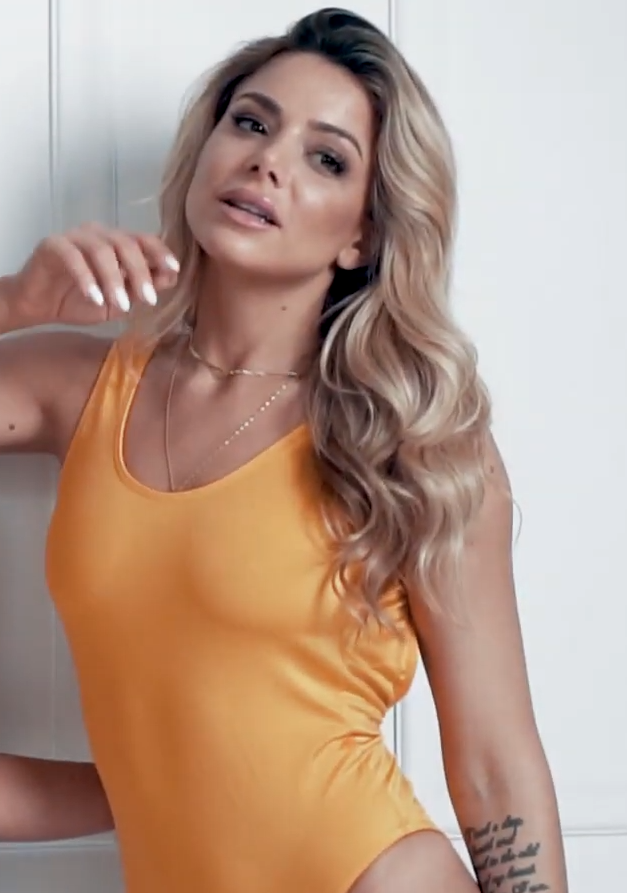
- Josephine in April 2019

Background information
- Born: Jessica Josephine Wendel; 22 August 1990 (age 36); Athens, Greece
- Genres: Pop, dance
- Years active: 2013–present
- Label: Panik Records

Jessica Josephine Wendel (Greek: Τζέσικα Ζόζεφιν Βέντελ; born 22 August 1990), known professionally as Josephine, is a Greek singer. She is known for her participation in the Greek national final for the Eurovision Song Contest 2014 with the song "Dancing Night". Wendel has also competed in the Greek edition of the Your Face Sounds Familiar. On 26 December 2020, she won the fourth Greek season of Just the 2 of Us, along with actor and entrepreneur Nasos Papargyropoulos.

== Early life ==
Jessica Josephine Wendel was born on August 22, 1990, in Athens to German father (Alex Wendel) and Greek-born mother of Lebanese descent (Margarita Venti). She has two younger half-siblings (Irini and Erica) from her parents' next marriages. She went to American Community Schools of Athens. At the age of 18, she began Marketing–Management studies at Deree College and at the same time she was uploading cover songs on Facebook.

== Career ==
=== 2013–2014: The beginning and Eurovision ===
While still a student, Josephine met the manager and executive of Panik Records, George Arsenakos, in an event. Arsenakos already knew about Josephine by her covers she used to upload on Facebook and he asked her to cooperate. In March 2013, Wendel released her first song "Gia mia akoma fora" (For One More Time) in lyrics and music by herself and the rapper OGE. The song had a great success on YouTube with more than 8 million views. At the same year, three more songs got released; "Piso an gyriza to chrono" (If I turned back time) with Unique, "Radio" with Lunatic & RiskyKidd, and "Ola allazoun" (Everything changes) with Snik.

In 2014, she was nominated for the Eurovision Song Contest 2014 with the song "Dancing Night" in lyrics & music by DJ Mark Angelo but eventually came 4th place (last) in the Eurosong 2014 – a MAD show, Greek national final. In July of the same year, she released the song "Dromos agapis" (Love Road) in collaboration with Dj Kas and OGE, and in November she collaborated with DJ Pitsi for the song "Turn Off The Lights".

=== 2015–present: Your Face Sounds Familiar and new releases ===
In 2015, she starts appearing in the Apotheke nightclub with the famous Greek singer Katy Garbi, while she released two songs; "Prosehos" (Coming soon) and "Esy ki ego" (You and I). Wendel represented Greece with the song "Moonlight" in the New Wave Festival 2015, which was held in Sochi, Russia.

Subsequently, in 2016, she participated as a contestant at the third season of the Your Face Sounds Familiar, while she appeared in the MadWalk – The Fashion Music Project with OtherView and Maria Korinthiou, performing the song "All About That Bass" by Meghan Trainor. She also appeared in the MadWalk Cyprus where she performed "Love, Sex, Magic" with Konstantinos Frantzis. However, she released two more songs; "Kalokairines stigmes" (Summer Moments) with REC, and "San paramythi" (Like a Fairytale) with The Gatsbies.

In 2017, Josephine began live appearances at BOX Athens nightclub with OtherView and Melisses. In March, she released her song with title "Cocktail". Shortly afterwards, she appeared on MadWalk – The Fashion Music Project, this time with Konnie Metaxa, where they performed their new song "Sha La La (Amaxi)". In November of the same year, the song "Dyo stagones nero" (Two Drops of Water) is released in lyrics by OtherView, with whom she also appeared at the Fantasia Live Nightclub in the winter season 2017–18.

In February 2018, she started her own sports leggings collection, in collaboration with the clothing company Type Of Love. In the summer, Wendel released her new song "Magia" (Spells) which got a great success. She made a live tour in Thessaloniki with Konnie Metaxa and Lefteris Pantazis. In October, she made a guest appearance in the Greek version of the fashion show, My Style Rocks. She also made live appearances in the Athinon Arenas nightclub with Nikos Oikonomopoulos, Anna Kamarinou, Anastasios Rammos and Stelios Legakis. She was starring in the music inspection "Kano Comeback" by Michalis Reppas & Thanasis Papathanassiou, along with Fotis Sergoulopoulos, Tzeni Diagoupi and Konstantinos Frantzis at the Shamone Club.

On 17 January 2019, Josephine released her song "Pes mou pos" (Tell Me How), with the rapper Bo. On March 9, she released her song, entitled "Ti" (What) and on October 24, she released her new song, "Den Exo Sima" in lyrics and music by Leonidas Sozos. In September 2019, Wendel made her first international tour "JSPN Tour" in Miami, Florida, Philadelphia and New York, New York.

In 2020, Wendel released three new songs, "Fimi" (Fame) featuring MadClip, "Ego" and "Portofoli". She won the fourth Greek season of Just the 2 of Us, along with the actor and entrepreneur Nasos Papargyropoulos.

In 2021, Wendel released her first album (titled: 100%) with eleven songs: "100%", "Paliopaido", "Ego", "Allo Ena Psema" (with Anastasios Rammos), "Soma Keno", "Fimi", "Ti", "Den Exo Sima", "Magia", "Portofoli" and "Ego (Acoustic Version)". She also released two singles: "Ta Kalytera Paidia" and "Vlepo To Thanato Sou (The Black Bachelor OST)" (with George Kakosaios). During the winter season 2021–22, Wendel performed live at the nightclub Enastron, together with George Sabanis and Snik.

In 2022, Wendel released released six songs: “Tilefono,” “Geia Sou” (with Petros Iakovidis), “Kyma Mou,” “Work Out” (with Snik), “Simadia” (with OGE and Bossikan), and “Pirkaya.” She also appeared at the Mad Video Music Awards, performing “Geia Sou” (with Petros Iakovidis) and “Kyma Mou” (with Giannis Kritikos). In summer 2022, she did the Josephine Summer Tour 2022 across Greece, Cyprus, and the United States of America. During the winter season 2022–23, she performed live at the Vogue Club in Thessaloniki, together with Petros Iakovidis, Giannis Xanthopoulos and FY.

In 2023, Wendel released her second album (titled: Ta Kala Koritsia) with fifteen songs: "Kathrefti, Kathreftaki Mou", "Berdemata", "Ta Kala Koritsia", "Moira", "Game", "Prigkipissa", "Erota Mou", "Eisai Mia Thea (2023 Version}", "Mala", "Apagorevetai", "Poly Poly" (with Trannos), "Tilefono", "Geia Sou", "Kyma Mou" and "Pirkaya".

In 2024, Wendel released six songs: "Noumero 1", "Mythos", "Enas Xoros Ein' I Agapi", "Einai Xristougenna", "Prin Se Gnoriso (Ta Kakos Kimena)" (with Stavento) and "Kornaro (MAD VMA Remix)" (with Stathis Xenos and Ivan Greko). She also did USA-Canada tour, together with Antonis Remos and solo Australia tour. During the winter season 2024-25, she performed live at the nightclub YTON The Music Show, together with Nikos Vertis.

In 2025, Wendel released two songs: "Leei" and "Auto Pou Thes". She also performed live at the nightclub Kentro Athinon, together with Konstantinos Argiros.

== Discography ==
=== Albums ===
- 100% (2021)
- Ta Kala Koritsia (2023)

=== Singles ===
==== As lead artist ====
Title	Year	Peak chart positions	Album
Title	Year	GRE	Album
"Prosexos"	2015	—	Non-album single
"Esy Ki Ego"	2015	—	Non-album single
"Kalokairines Stigmes" (feat. REC)	2016	6	Non-album single
"Cocktail"	2017	50	Non-album single
"Sha La La La (Amaxi)" (feat. Konnie Metaxa)	2017	60	Non-album single
"Dyo Stagones Nero"	2017	88	Non-album single
"Magia"	2018	5	100%
"Ti"	2019	11	100%
"Den Eho Sima"	2019	16	100%
"Ego"	2020	5	100%
"Fimi" (feat. MadClip)	2020	1	100%
"Portofoli"	2020	—	100%
"Paliopaido"	2021	42	100%
"Ta Kalitera Paidia"	2021	—	100% (Platinum Edition)
"Vlepo To Thanato Sou" (with George Kakosaios)	2021	—	"The Black Bachelor"
"Tilefono"	2022	—	Ta Kala Koritsia
"Kyma mou"	2022	—	Ta Kala Koritsia
"Pirkaya"	2022	—	Ta Kala Koritsia

==== As featured artist ====
Title	Year	Peak chart positions	Album
Title	Year	GRE	Album
"Gia Mia Akoma Fora" (Oge feat. Josephine)	2013	—	Non-album single
"Piso An Giriza To Xrono" (Unique feat. Josephine)	2013	—	Non-album single
"Ola Allazoun" (SNIK feat. Josephine)	2013	—	Non-album single
"Radio" (Lunatic feat. RiskyKidd & Josephine)	2014	—	Non-album single
"Dancing Night" (Mark Angelo feat. Josephine)	2014	—	Non-album single
"Dromos Agapis" (DJ Kas feat. Josephine & OGE)	2014	—	Non-album single
"Turn Off the Lights" (DJ Pitsi feat. Josephine)	2014	—	Non-album single
"San Paramythi" (The Gatsbies feat. Josephine)	2016	—	Non-album single
"Pes Mou Pos" (Bo feat. Josephine)	2019	62	Non-album single
"Simadia" (Oge feat. Bossikan x Josephine)	2022		Non-album single
"Work Out" (Snik feat. Josephine)	2022		Non-album single

== Filmography ==
=== Television ===
Year	Title	Role(s)	Notes	Ref.
2009	X Factor Denmark	Herself (contestant)	2 episodes	
2013-2014	Party Nation	Herself (host)	Music talk show	
2014	MAD Video Music Awards	Herself (performance)	TV special	
2016	Your Face Sounds Familiar	Herself (contestant)	12 episodes; season 3	
2016	MadWalk - The Fashion Music Project	Herself (performance)	TV special	
2017	MadWalk - The Fashion Music Project	Herself (performance)	TV special	
2018	MadWalk - The Fashion Music Project	Herself (performance)	TV special	
2019	MAD Video Music Awards	Herself (performance)	TV special	
2020	Amita Motion - 2019 Positive Energy Day	Herself (host)	TV special	
2020	Just the 2 of Us	Herself (coach)	Winner; season 4	
2020	MAD Video Music Awards	Herself (performance)	TV special	
2021	MAD Video Music Awards	Herself (performance)	TV special	
2021	MadWalk - The Fashion Music Project	Herself (performance)	TV special	
2022	MAD Video Music Awards	Herself (performance)	TV special	
2022	MadWalk - The Fashion Music Project	Herself (performance)	TV special	
2023	The Voice of Greece	Herself (advisor)	Battle 1-2; season 9	
2023	MAD Video Music Awards	Herself (performance)	TV special	
2023	MadWalk - The Fashion Music Project	Herself (performance)	TV special	
2024	MAD Video Music Awards	Herself (performance)	TV special	
2024	The Curse of Jela Delafragka	Herself	1 episode	
2024	MadWalk - The Fashion Music Project	Herself (performance)	TV special	
