= Koza Mostra =

Greek rock band

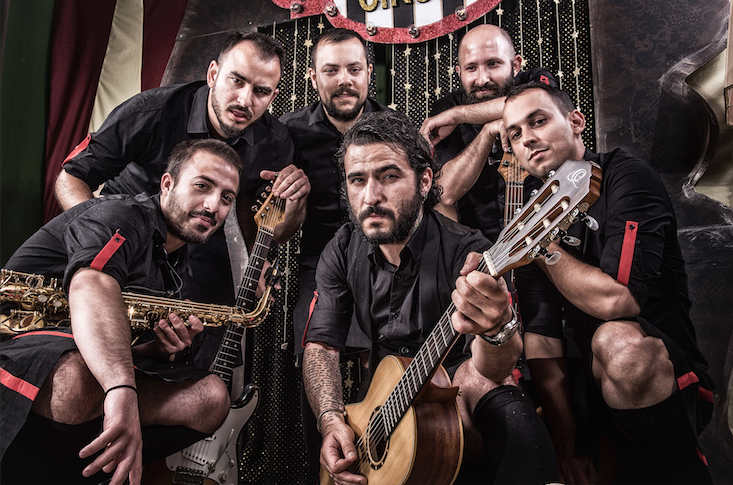
- Koza Mostra in 2017

Background information
- Origin: Greece, Thessaloniki
- Genres: Ska, Alternative, Folk, Balkan Music, Punk, Tarantella, Rock
- Years active: 2012–present
- Labels: Panik Platinum Records, Panik Oxygen Records, Koza Mostra Music
- Members: Ilias Kozas; Dimitris Raptis; Asterios Fragos; Giannis Bellos; Stavros Apostolidis; Sofia Staikou

Koza Mostra is a Greek rock band founded in 2012. It consists of Ilias Kozas (lead singer, classical and electric guitar), Dimitris Raptis (drums), Stavros Apostolidis (bouzouki, backing vocals), Giannis Bellos (bass guitar, backing vocals), Sofia Staikou (violin, backing vocals) and Asterios Fragos (electric guitar, backing vocals). The band fuses ska, punk, and rock music together with the style of traditional Greek folk music such as Macedonian Greek music and rebetiko.

They represented Greece in the Eurovision Song Contest 2013 with Agathonas Iakovidis and the song "Alcohol Is Free", placed 6th in the final.

Their debut album, Keep up the Rhythm, released on March 22, 2013, reached triple Platinum certification from Greek music industry authority IFPI. It was published by Panik Platinum Records, which is a sublabel of Panik Entertainment Group responsible for "Greek Ethnic music".

On December 15, 2017, they released their second album entitled Corrida. This album was published by Panik Oxygen Records, also a sublabel of Panik Entertainment Group. Subsequent releases were self-released without a label by Koza Mostra.

The album artwork for Koza Mostra's two studio albums, was created by Paul Hitter, who is also responsible for the majority of American punk band Gogol Bordello's artwork.

On February 1, 2020 they released a single entitled "Requiem" featuring Pedro Erazo of Gogol Bordello.

On June 27, 2022, they released a single entitled "Bilio".

On January 6, 2024 they released a single entitled "Elvis".

On September 28, 2024 the band announced on social media, that they would be doing an album preview tour in the United Kingdom, and revealing the title of their upcoming third album, Malaka. The release date was later revealed to be 30 November 2024.

On January 4, 2026 ERT announced the band would compete on Sing for Greece for a chance to represent Greece at Eurovision 2026 with the song "Bulletproof". They qualified for the final and finished 9th.

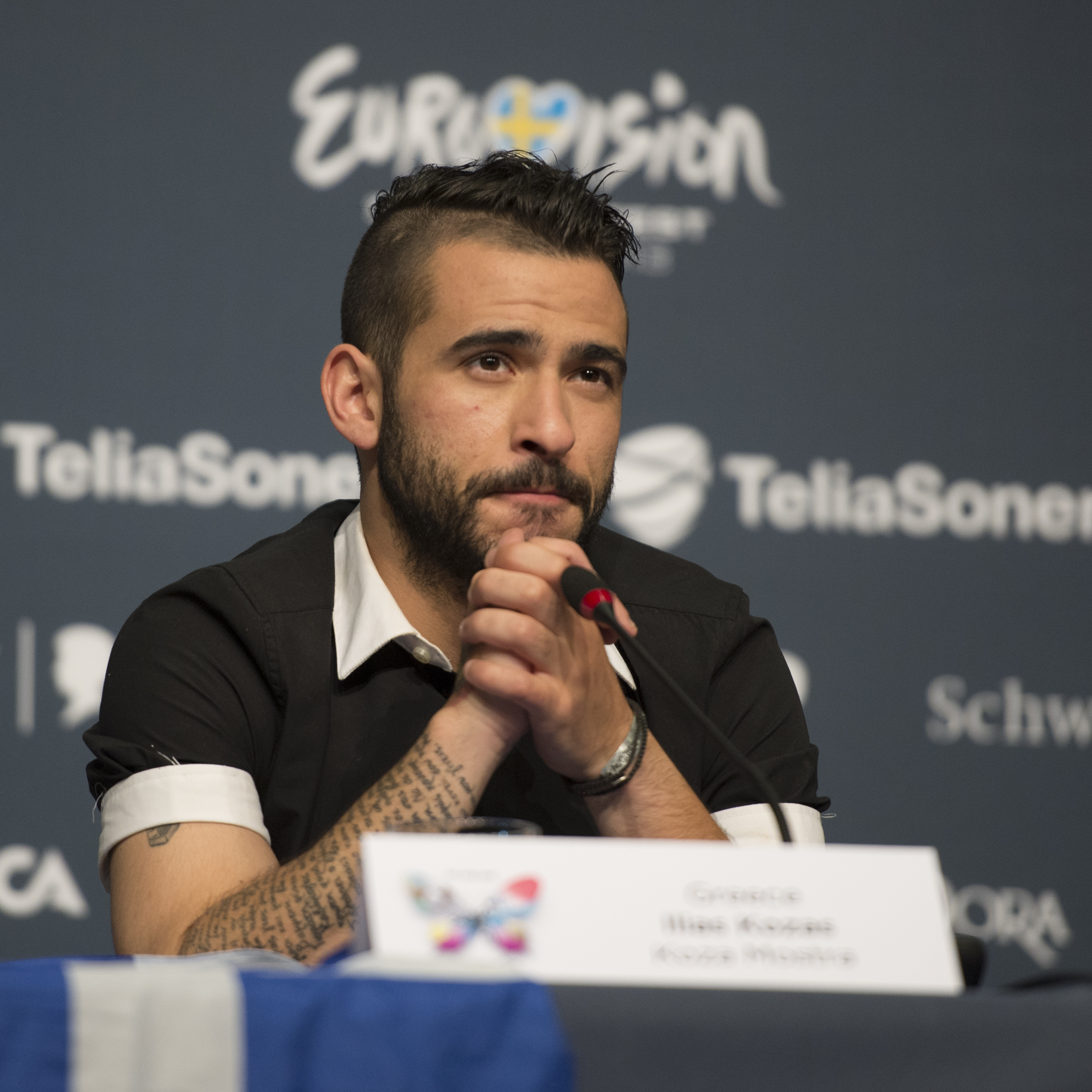
Lead singer Ilias Kozas at a Eurovision Song Contest 2013 press conference.

== Discography ==
=== Albums ===
Title	Charts	Info
Title	(Greece)	Info
Keep up the Rhythm	1	Released: March 22, 2013; Labels: Panik Platinum Records; Formats: CD, Digital download; Album Art: Paul Hitter
Corrida	57	Released: December 15, 2017; Labels: Panik Oxygen Records; Formats: CD, Digital download; Album Art: Paul Hitter
Malaka	—	Release date: 30 November 2024

=== Singles ===
Title	Year	Peak chart positions				Album
Title	Year	GR	GER	NL	UK	Album
"Me Trela"	2012	—	—	—	—	Keep up the Rhythm
"Desire"	2012	—	—	—	—	Keep up the Rhythm
"Alcohol Is Free" (feat. Agathonas Iakovidis)	2013	1	85	95	30	Keep up the Rhythm
"Lianohortaroudia"	2013	—	—	—	—	Keep up the Rhythm
"Ti Kano Edo"	2013	—	—	—	—	Corrida
"Giorti"	2014	—	—	—	—	Corrida
"Bordello Originale"	2014	—	—	—	—	Corrida
"3 Year Anniversary Song"	2015	—	—	—	—	Non-album single
"Leventis" (Mikis Theodorakis Cover)	2015	—	—	—	—	Corrida
"Amerika" (Dubioza Kolektiv Cover)	2016	—	—	—	—	Corrida
"Don't Panic, We're On Titanic"	2017	—	—	—	—	Corrida
"Requiem" (feat. Pedro Erazo)	2020	—	—	—	—	Malaka
"Bilio"	2022	—	—	—	—	Malaka
"Elvis"	2024	—	—	—	—	Malaka
"—" denotes single that did not chart or was not released.

== Awards ==
Year	Award	Category	Work/Role	Result
2014	IFPI	3× Platinum Album	Keep up the Rhythm	Won
2014	MAD Video Music Awards	Alternative	Alcohol is Free	Nominated

Preceded by Eleftheria Eleftheriou with "Aphrodisiac"	Greece in the Eurovision Song Contest; 2013 with Agathonas Iakovidis	Succeeded by Freaky Fortune featuring RiskyKidd with "Rise Up"
