= Riskykidd =

Greek rapper

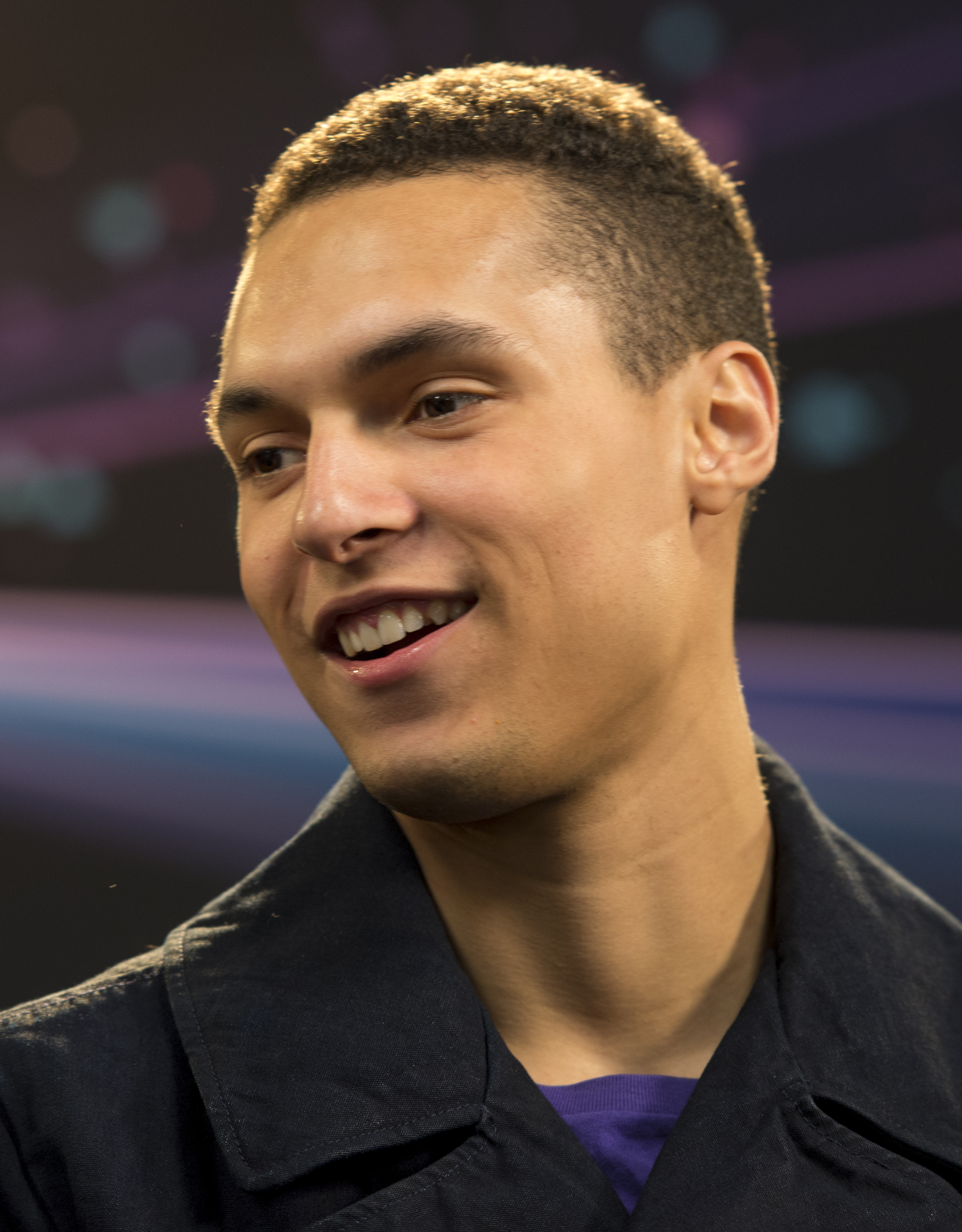
- Riskykidd in April 2014

Background information
- Also known as: Riskykidd
- Born: Shane Dillon Schuller; London, England
- Origin: Greece
- Genre: Hip hop
- Occupations: Rapper; songwriter
- Instrument: Vocals
- Years active: 2012–present
- Label: Melody Gang

Shane Dillon Schuller, better known by the stage name Riskykidd, is a British-Greek rapper and songwriter. He is known for representing Greece in the Eurovision Song Contest 2014 alongside Freaky Fortune, with the song "Rise Up".

== Early life ==
Shane Schuller was born to parents of Jamaican and German ancestry. He moved to Greece later in his life, because his father was living there.

== Career ==
=== Eurovision Song Contest ===
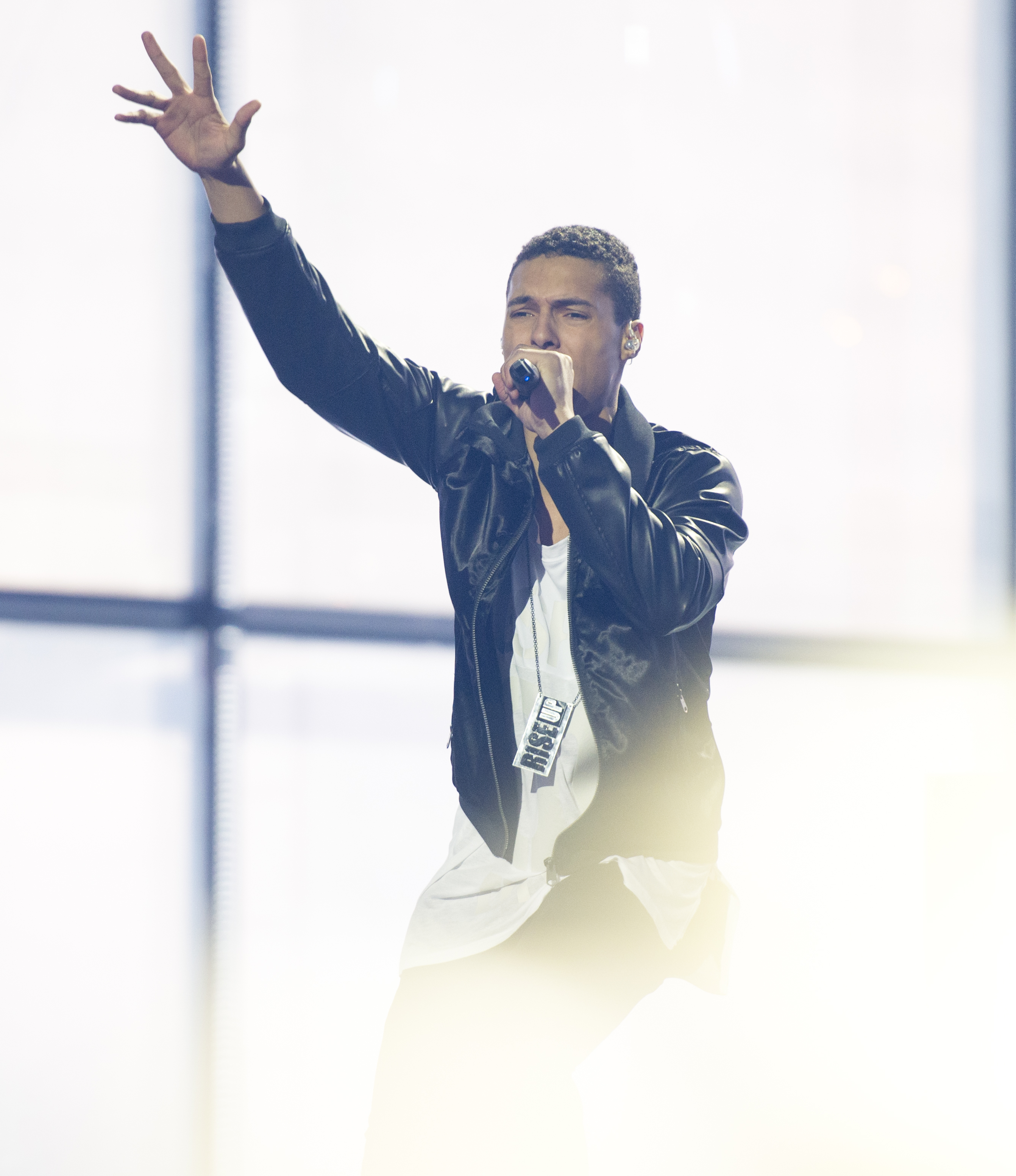
Riskykidd performing at the Eurovision Song Contest 2014.

On 11 March 2014, Riskykidd, alongside Freaky Fortune, participated in the Greek national final for the Eurovision Song Contest 2014. After performing second in Eurosong 2014, "Rise Up" topped the 29% of the jury vote and 45% of the televote, 37% of available votes, winning the right to represent Greece in Copenhagen, Denmark.

On 20 January 2014, at Copenhagen City Hall, the semi-final allocation draw assigned Greece to perform in the second semifinal. They performed 13th in the second semi-final on 8 May 2014. At the end of the broadcast, Freaky Fortune and Riskykidd were revealed as one of the 10 qualifiers, earning Greece a spot in the grand final. "Rise Up" received 74 points, placing 7th in the second semi-final. The international juries ranked the song 9th with 52 points, while the international televote ranked it 5th, giving 91 points.

On 10 May 2014, "Rise Up" was placed 10th in the grand final running order. During the voting sequence, "Rise Up" received a total of 35 points from all, placing 20th out of 26 songs. The song ranked 14th in the public televote and 19th with the international juries.

=== Awards ===
In 2013, Riskykidd was nominated for Video of the Year, Viral Song of the Year, Best Duet/Collaboration, and Best Dance Video at the MAD Video Music Awards for "All the Time." He won the awards for Best Duet/Collaboration and Best Dance Video alongside Playmen, Elena Paparizou, and Courtney.

He was again nominated for Best Duet/Collaboration at the MAD VMAs in 2017 alongside Demy on the "This is Love" music video. Riskykidd has performed at the awards show on several occasions.

=== Music releases ===
Riskykidd released his first studio album, I'm Risky, in 2016 with 314, a pop/dance digital record label and a member of the Antenna Group. After the COVID-19 pandemic, he began releasing music independently. In 2021, Riskykidd released I'm Risky II through Melody Gang, a joint venture with Gio Melody and his current label.

For most of his career, he collaborated with Panik Records. However, after the COVID-19 pandemic, Schuller began releasing music independently. In recent years, songs by the rapper have contained explicit content.

== Discography ==
=== Studio albums ===
Albums
Title	Details
I'm Risky	Released: 4 November 2016; Label: 314
I'm Risky II	Released: 20 November 2021; Label: Melody Gang

=== Singles ===
Title	Year	Album
"All the Time" (with Playmen, Elena Paparizou and Courtney)	2012	The Playbook
"Radio" (Lunatic feat. Riskykidd & Josephine)"	2013	Non-album singles
"Rise Up" (with Freaky Fortune)	2014	The Playbook
"KP with the Stunnaz"	2015	Non-album singles
"#Bang!" (Arva feat. Iro Legaki & Riskykidd)	2015	Non-album singles
"Θέλω Να Ζήσω" (Thelo Na Ziso (with Kim Diamantopoulos)	2015	Non-album singles
"Celebration" Steve Onemanshow feat. Riskykidd)	2019	Non-album singles
"Countin Up" (feat. CaptainLAZ)	2022	Non-album singles
"Many G's" (feat. Chef Kay)	2022	Non-album singles
"Trap Out the Bowl"	2022	Non-album singles
"Dollis Hill" (feat. Young Asko, Pantass)	2022	Non-album singles
"Top G" (feat. Oge)	2023	Non-album singles
"Roza" (Sin Boy feat Yolte, Riskykidd, Bvcovia, NOE)	2023	ZERO2HERO

Preceded by Koza Mostra & Agathonas Iakovidis with "Alcohol Is Free"	Greece in the Eurovision Song Contest; 2014	Succeeded by Maria Elena Kyriakou with "One Last Breath"
