= Just the 2 of Us (Greek TV series) season 4 =

Just the 2 of Us
- Season 4
- Hosted by: Nikos Koklonis; Laura Karaiskou (Backstage)
- Judges: Despina Vandi; Maria Bakodimou; Stamatis Fasoulis; Vicky Stavropoulou
- Celebrity winner: Nasos Papargyropoulos
- Professional winner: Josephine

Release
- Original network: Open TV
- Original release: October 17 – December 26, 2020

Season chronology
- ← Previous; Season 3 Next → Season 5

The fourth season of the Greek reality show Just the 2 of Us began airing on October 17, 2020 for the second time on Open TV.

Host Nikos Koklonis and judges Despina Vandi, Maria Bakodimou, Stamatis Fasoulis and Vicky Stavropoulou, from the previous season all returned. Laura Karaiskou replaced Vicky Kavoura as the new backstage host.

Like in the previous season, 14 contestants participated on the show. This season all shows were aired live.

On December 26, 2020, Nasos Papargyropoulos and Josephine were declared the winners. Katerina Zarifi and Anastasios Rammos, and Zoi Dimitrakou and Lefteris Pantazis came in second place.

== Judges ==
- Despina Vandi, singer, actress.
- Maria Bakodimou, television presenter.
- Stamatis Fasoulis, actor.
- Vicky Stavropoulou, actress.

== Couples ==
It was announced that Piyi Devetzi would participate this season with Efi Sarri, but some days before the premiere of the show, Devetzi was positive with coronavirus. She was replaced by Trifonas Samaras. Since the second week, Rachel Makri couldn't take any more place in the show, because she had an accident and she was replaced by Evridiki Valavani.

Celebrity	Occupation	Professional singer	Status
Evridiki Papadopoulou	Model, Businesswoman	Triadafilos	Eliminated 1st on October 24, 2020
Alexis Pappas	Actor	Christina Salti	Eliminated 2nd on November 14, 2020
Parthena Horozidou	Actress	Christos Cholidis	Eliminated 3rd on November 21, 2020
Giannis Athitakis	Actor, Model	Zozo Sapoundzaki	Eliminated 4th on November 28, 2020
Trifonas Samaras	Hair Stylist	Efi Sarri	Eliminated 5th on December 5, 2020
Thanasis Passas	Comedian	Gogo Tsamba	Eliminated 6th on December 12, 2020
Antonis Loudaros	Actor	Penny Baltatzi	Eliminated 7th on December 17, 2020
Alexandra Katsaiti	Stylist	Giorgos Tsalikis	Eliminated 8th on December 19, 2020
Evridiki Valavani	Sports Journalist	Ilias Vrettos	Eliminated 8th on December 19, 2020
Natasa Kalogridi	Actress	Nikolas Raptakis	Eliminated 10th on December 25, 2020
Zenia Bonatsou	Actress	Vangelis Kakouriotis	Eliminated 10th on December 25, 2020
Zoi Dimitrakou	Basketball player	Lefteris Pantazis	Third Place on December 26, 2020
Katerina Zarifi	Actress	Anastasios Rammos	Runner up on December 26, 2020
Nasos Papargyropoulos	Businessman, Actor	Josephine	Winner on December 26, 2020

== Scoring chart ==
Couple	Place	Week									
Couple	Place	2	3	4	5	6	7	8	9	10	11
Nasos & Josephine	1	20	31	33	36	38	40	38	40	40	40+40+40=120
Katerina & Anastasios	2	29	28	27	33	30	33	40	40	40	38+39+33=110
Zoi & Lefteris	3	21	24	30	22	26	26	36	28	32	32+32+28=92
Zenia & Vangelis	4	23	29	26	32	34	35	40	37	38	
Natasa & Nikolas	4	32	35	35	37	39	40	40	38	38	
Evridiki & Ilias	6	24	22	27	23	30	32	34	33		
Alexandra & Giorgos	6	19	21	31	33	23	26	40	34		
Antonis & Penny	8	30	36	31	32	38	40	36			
Thanasis & Gogo	9	26	18	26	29	29	32				
Trifonas & Efi	10	14	22	28	19	18					
Giannis & Zozo	11	28	32	32	34						
Parthena & Christos	12	25	30	35							
Alexis & Christina	13	20	20								
Evridiki & Triadafilos	14	16									

Red numbers indicate the lowest score for each week
Green numbers indicate the highest score for each week
the couple eliminated that week
the returning couple finishing in the bottom two/three
indicates the couple which was immune from elimination
the winning couple
the runner-up couple
the third-place couple

=== Average score chart ===
This table only counts for performances scored on a traditional 40-points scale.

Rank by average	Place	Couple	Total points	Number of performances	Average
1	4	Natasa & Nikolas	334	9	37.1
2	1	Nasos & Josephine	436	12	36.3
3	8	Antonis & Penny	243	7	34.7
4	2	Katerina & Anastasios	410	12	34.1
5	4	Zenia & Vangelis	294	9	32.6
6	11	Giannis & Zozo	126	4	31.5
7	12	Parthena & Christos	90	3	30.0
8	6	Alexandra & Giorgos	227	8	28.3
9	6	Evridiki & Ilias	225	8	28.1
10	3	Zoi & Lefteris	337	12	28.0
11	9	Thanasis & Gogo	160	6	26.6
12	10	Trifonas & Efi	101	5	20.2
13	13	Alexis & Christina	40	2	20.0
14	14	Evridiki & Triadafilos	16	1	16.0

== Weekly scores ==
=== Week 1: Launch show ===
In the first week, the judges didn't voted, as it was the first show and also nobody was eliminated.

Order	Couple	Song
1	Parthena & Christos	"Anaveis Foties"
2	Katerina & Anastasios	"Blinding Lights"
3	Zoi & Lefteris	"Den zitao polla"
4	Alexis & Christina	"Stou Thoma"
5	Evridiki & Triadafilos	"Paradothika se sena"
6	Nasos & Josephine	"Umbrella"
7	Alexandra & Giorgos	"Emis"
8	Antonis & Penny	"Saitia"
9	Rachel & Ilias	"Anapadites Kliseis"
10	Giannis & Zozo	"Mabo Brazilero"
11	Natasa & Nikolas	"Music"
12	Zenia & Vangelis	"Savage Love"
13	Thanasis & Gogo	"Handra Thalassia"
14	Trifonas & Efi	"Ego den pao Megaro"

=== Week 2 ===
Order	Couple	Song	Judge's Scores				Total	Result
Order	Couple	Song	Vicky	Stamatis	Despina	Maria	Total	Result
1	Alexis & Christina	"Den exei sidera i Kardia sou"	5	5	5	5	20	Safe
2	Zenia & Vangelis	"Eleges"	6	6	6	5	23	Safe
3	Alexandra & Giorgos	"Someone You Loved"	5	5	5	4	19	Safe
4	Nasos & Josephine	"I Agapi thelei Dyo"	5	5	5	5	20	Bottom two
5	Parthena & Christos	"Mia Kardia gia Senane"	6	6	7	6	25	Safe
6	Antonis & Penny	"Frozen"	7	8	8	7	30	Safe
7	Thanasis & Gogo	"Ti Ti"	6	7	7	6	26	Safe
8	Zoi & Lefteris	"Me Stenahori"	5	6	6	4	21	Safe
9	Giannis & Zozo	"Amado Mio"	7	7	7	7	28	Safe
10	Trifonas & Efi	"Eho Mian Arravoniara"	4	3	3	4	14	Safe
11	Katerina & Anastasios	"Imarton"	7	8	7	7	29	Safe
12	Evridiki & Ilias	"Agapi Ipervoliki"	6	6	6	6	24	Safe
13	Natasa & Nikolas	"De Les Kouvenda"	8	8	8	8	32	Safe
14	Evridiki & Triadafilos	"Caliente"	4	4	4	4	16	Eliminated

=== Week 3 ===
Order	Couple	Song	Judge's Scores				Total	Result
Order	Couple	Song	Vicky	Stamatis	Despina	Maria	Total	Result
1	Alexandra & Giorgos	"Mavri Lista"	6	5	5	5	21	Safe
2	Parthena & Christos	"Let Me Entertain You"	7	8	8	7	30	Safe
3	Evridiki & Ilias	"Dikos sou gia Panta"	6	5	5	6	22	Safe
4	Nasos & Josephine	"I Like It"	8	8	8	7	31	Safe
5	Zoi & Lefteris	"To Melachrinaki"	6	6	6	6	24	Safe
6	Natasa & Nikolas	"El tango de Roxanne"	9	9	8	9	35	Safe
7	Giannis & Zozo	"Ala"	8	8	8	8	32	Safe
8	Zenia & Vangelis	"Jai Ho! (You Are My Destiny)"	7	8	7	7	29	Safe
9	Thanasis & Gogo	"Sex"	5	5	4	4	18	Bottom two
10	Antonis & Penny	"Trito Stefani"	9	9	9	9	36	Safe
11	Katerina & Anastasios	"I Tacheia"	7	7	7	7	28	Safe
12	Alexis & Christina	"Skoni kai Thripsala"	5	5	5	5	20	Eliminated
13	Trifonas & Efi	"Stin Pira"	5	6	5	6	22	Safe

=== Week 4 ===
Order	Couple	Song	Judge's Scores				Total	Result
Order	Couple	Song	Vicky	Stamatis	Despina	Maria	Total	Result
1	Thanasis & Gogo	"Fila Me"	7	6	6	7	26	Safe
2	Natasa & Nikolas	"Jailhouse Rock"	8	9	9	9	35	Safe
3	Evridiki & Ilias	"Tha Ekrago"	7	7	7	6	27	Safe
4	Parthena & Christos	"To Dikio Mou"	9	8	9	9	35	Eliminated
5	Giannis & Zozo	"Ekatommiria"	7	8	8	9	32	Safe
6	Alexandra & Giorgos	"Djadja (song)"	8	7	8	8	31	Safe
7	Zoi & Lefteris	"Caramela"	7	8	8	7	30	Safe
8	Antonis & Penny	"Se Eho Kanei Theo"	8	8	7	8	31	Bottom two
9	Zenia & Vangelis	"Se Thelo, Me Theleis"	7	7	6	6	26	Safe
10	Nasos & Josephine	"Katalliles Proipotheseis"	9	8	8	8	33	Safe
11	Katerina & Anastasios	"Giagia kai Pappous"	7	6	7	7	27	Safe
12	Trifonas & Efi	"I Soultana i Fofo"	6	6	6	10	28	Safe

=== Week 5 ===
Order	Couple	Song	Judge's Scores				Total	Result
Order	Couple	Song	Vicky	Stamatis	Despina	Maria	Total	Result
1	Zenia & Vangelis	"Call Me Maybe"	8	8	8	8	32	Safe
2	Antonis & Penny	"Lola"	8	8	7	9	32	Safe
3	Zoi & Lefteris	"Masai"	5	6	6	5	22	Safe
4	Katerina & Anastasios	"Born to Be Wild	8	8	8	9	33	Safe
5	Thanasis & Gogo	"Kouventa stin Kouventa"	8	8	7	6	29	Bottom two
6	Natasa & Nikolas	"I Tampakiera"	9	8	10	10	37	Safe
7	Giannis & Zozo	"Diamonds Are Forever / Diamonds from Sierra Leone"	9	9	8	8	34	Eliminated
8	Nasos & Josephine	"What Goes Around... Comes Around"	9	9	9	9	36	Safe
9	Trifonas & Efi	"Ah Koumpara, Ah Koumpare"	5	4	4	6	19	Safe
10	Evridiki & Ilias	"Eflekta Ilika"	6	5	6	6	23	Safe
11	Alexandra & Giorgos	"Sotiri mou, Sotiri mou"	9	8	8	8	33	Safe

=== Week 6 ===
Order	Couple	Song	Judge's Scores				Total	Result
Order	Couple	Song	Vicky	Stamatis	Despina	Maria	Total	Result
1	Evridiki & Ilias	"Livin' la Vida Loca"	8	7	8	7	30	Safe
2	Alexandra & Giorgos	"Ginetai"	6	6	6	5	23	Safe
3	Zenia & Vangelis	"Mouri"	9	9	8	8	34	Safe
4	Natasa & Nikolas	"My Sharona	10	9	10	10	39	Safe
5	Nasos & Josephine	"To Dilitirio"	10	9	10	9	38	Safe
6	Zoi & Lefteris	"Mambo"	6	7	7	6	26	Safe
7	Antonis & Penny	"I Nichta Dyo Kommatia"	9	10	10	9	38	Safe
8	Trifonas & Efi	"Kokosalesi"	5	4	4	5	18	Eliminated
9	Thanasis & Gogo	"Fasaria"	7	6	8	8	29	Safe
10	Katerina & Anastasios	"To Prosklitirio"	7	7	7	9	30	Bottom two

=== Week 7: Eurovision Night ===
Order	Couple	Country	Song	Judge's Scores				Total	Result
Order	Couple	Country	Song	Vicky	Stamatis	Despina	Maria	Total	Result
1	Alexandra & Giorgos	Sweden	"Waterloo"	7	6	6	7	26	Safe
2	Zoi & Lefteris	Armenia	"Qélé, Qélé"	6	7	6	7	26	Safe
3	Evridiki & Ilias	Greece	"My Number One"	8	8	8	8	32	Bottom two
4	Zenia & Vangelis	Turkey	"Everyway That I Can"	9	9	9	8	35	Safe
5	Nasos & Josephine	Ukraine	"Wild Dances"	10	10	10	10	40	Safe
6	Antonis & Penny	Ukraine	"Dancing Lasha Tumbai"	10	10	10	10	40	Safe
7	Natasa & Vangelis	Israel	"Diva"	10	10	10	10	40	Safe
8	Thanassis & Gogo	Greece	"I Anixi"	8	8	8	8	32	Eliminated
9	Katerina & Anastasios	Finland	"Hard Rock Hallelujah"	9	8	8	8	33	Safe

=== Week 8: Greek Cinema Night ===
Order	Couple	Song	Judge's Scores				Total	Result
Order	Couple	Song	Vicky	Stamatis	Despina	Maria	Total	Result
1	Evridiki & Ilias	"Tou Agoriou Apenanti"	9	8	8	9	34	Safe
2	Katerina & Anastasios	"Ipomoni"	10	10	10	10	40	Safe
3	Natasa & Nikolas	"To Fantaraki"	10	10	10	10	40	Bottom two
4	Zenia & Vangelis	"Eisai Paidi mou Peirasmos"	10	10	10	10	40	Safe
5	Antonis & Penny	"Anoixe Petra"	9	9	9	9	36	Eliminated
6	Zoi & Lefteris	"Sou to' pa Mia kai Dyo kai Treis"	9	9	9	9	36	Safe
7	Nasos & Josephine	"Poios Einai Autos"	10	9	9	10	38	Safe
8	Alexandra & Giorgos	"Apone"	10	10	10	10	40	Safe

=== Week 9: 80's Night ===
Order	Couple	Song	Judge's Scores				Total	Result
Order	Couple	Song	Vicky	Stamatis	Despina	Maria	Total	Result
1	Alexandra & Giorgos	"Sti Discotek"	9	8	9	8	34	Eliminated
2	Evridiki & Ilias	"Wake Me Up Before You Go-Go"	9	8	8	8	33	Eliminated
3	Zoi & Lefteris	"Push- Ups"	7	7	7	7	28	Safe
4	Nasos & Josephine	"Without You"	10	10	10	10	40	Safe
5	Zenia & Vangelis	"Boys"	9	10	9	9	37	Safe
6	Katerina & Anastasios	"Poia Thisia"	10	10	10	10	40	Safe
7	Natasa & Nikolas	"Sweet Dreams (Are Made of This)"	10	9	9	10	38	Bottom three

=== Week 10: Semi final ===
Order	Couple	Song	Judge's Scores				Total	Result
Order	Couple	Song	Vicky	Stamatis	Despina	Maria	Total	Result
1	Zoi & Lefteris	"Feliz Navidad"	8	8	8	8	32	Bottom three
2	Zenia & Vangelis	"Eimai Allou"	10	10	9	9	38	Eliminated
3	Natasa & Nikolas	"Mechri to Telos tou Kosmou"	9	9	10	10	38	Eliminated
4	Katerina & Anastasios	"Ta Laika"	10	10	10	10	40	Safe
5	Nasos & Josephine	"Let It Snow"	10	10	10	10	40	Safe

=== Week 11: Final ===
Order	Couple	Song	Judge's Scores				Total	Result
Order	Couple	Song	Vicky	Stamatis	Despina	Maria	Total	Result
1	Katerina & Anastasios	"Imarton"	10	10	9	9	38	Runner-up
1	Katerina & Anastasios	"Apopse Siopiloi"	10	9	10	10	39	Runner-up
1	Katerina & Anastasios	"Gia Na S'ekdikitho"	9	8	8	8	33	Runner-up
2	Zoi & Lefteris	"Caramela"	8	8	8	8	32	Third place
2	Zoi & Lefteris	"Den Echo Palatia kai Lefta"	8	8	8	8	32	Third place
2	Zoi & Lefteris	"Gia Na S'ekdikitho"	7	7	7	7	28	Third place
3	Nasos & Josephine	"To Dilitirio"	10	10	10	10	40	Winner
3	Nasos & Josephine	"The Phantom of the Opera"	10	10	10	10	40	Winner
3	Nasos & Josephine	"Gia Na S'ekdikitho"	10	10	10	10	40	Winner

== Ratings ==
Live	Date	Ratings (total)	Ratings (ages 18–54)	Source
1	October 17, 2020	14.5%	15.3%	
2	October 24, 2020	16.8%	17.8%	
3	November 14, 2020	11.8%	11.9%	
4	November 21, 2020	11.8%	12.5%	
5	November 28, 2020	12.5%	11.8%	
6	December 5, 2020	15.4%	14.4%	
7	December 12, 2020	12.4%	11.2%	
8	December 17, 2020	11.5%	11%	
9	December 19, 2020	15.3%	14.3%	
10	December 25, 2020	16.5%	16%	
11	December 26, 2020	23.3%	23%	
Average		14.7%	14.5%	—N/a
