= Evangelismos, Thessaloniki =

Evangelismos Ευαγγελισμός
- Community
- Location within Greece
- Coordinates: 40°41.7′N 23°13.2′E
- Country: Greece
- Administrative region: Central Macedonia
- Regional unit: Thessaloniki
- Municipality: Volvi
- Municipal unit: Egnatia

Area
  - Community: 21.325 km^{2} (8.234 sq mi)
- Elevation: 115 m (377 ft)

Population (2021)
  - Community: 392
  - Density: 18.4/km^{2} (47.6/sq mi)
- Time zone: UTC+2 (EET)
  - Summer (DST): UTC+3 (EEST)
- Postal code: 572 00
- Area code: +30-2394
- Vehicle registration: NA to NX

Evangelismos (Greek: Ευαγγελισμός) is a village and a community of the Volvi municipality. Before the 2011 local government reform it was part of the municipality of Egnatia, of which it was a municipal district. The 2021 census recorded 392 inhabitants in the village. The community of Evangelismos covers an area of 21.325 km^{2}.

== See also ==
- List of settlements in the Thessaloniki regional unit
