= Rise Up (Freaky Fortune song) =

2014 song by Freaky Fortune feat. Riskykidd

Single by Freaky Fortune feat. Riskykidd
- Released: 2014
- Label: Panik Records
- Songwriters: Freaky Fortune, Riskykidd

Music video
- "Rise Up" on YouTube

Eurovision Song Contest 2014 entry
- Country: Greece
- Artist: Freaky Fortune feat. Riskykidd
- Language: English
- Composer: Freaky Fortune
- Lyricists: Freaky Fortune, Riskykidd

Finals performance
- Semi-final result: 7th
- Semi-final points: 74
- Final result: 20th
- Final points: 35

Entry chronology
- ◄ "Alcohol Is Free" (2013)
- "One Last Breath" (2015) ►

Song presentation
- file; help

Official performance video
- "Rise Up (Semi-Final) on YouTube "Rise Up (Final) on YouTube

"Rise Up" is a song by Greek electronic duo Freaky Fortune featuring Greek rapper Riskykidd. It represented Greece at the Eurovision Song Contest 2014 in Denmark.

== Critical reception ==
The song received mixed to positive reviews. Daily Mirror entertainment writer Carl Greenwood gave the song 1 star out of 5 and said, "Rise Up is the sort of song that gets stuck in your head." Jess Denham of The Independent, "Rise Up" has a definite holiday vibe to it, just in time for the start of summer."

== Eurovision Song Contest ==
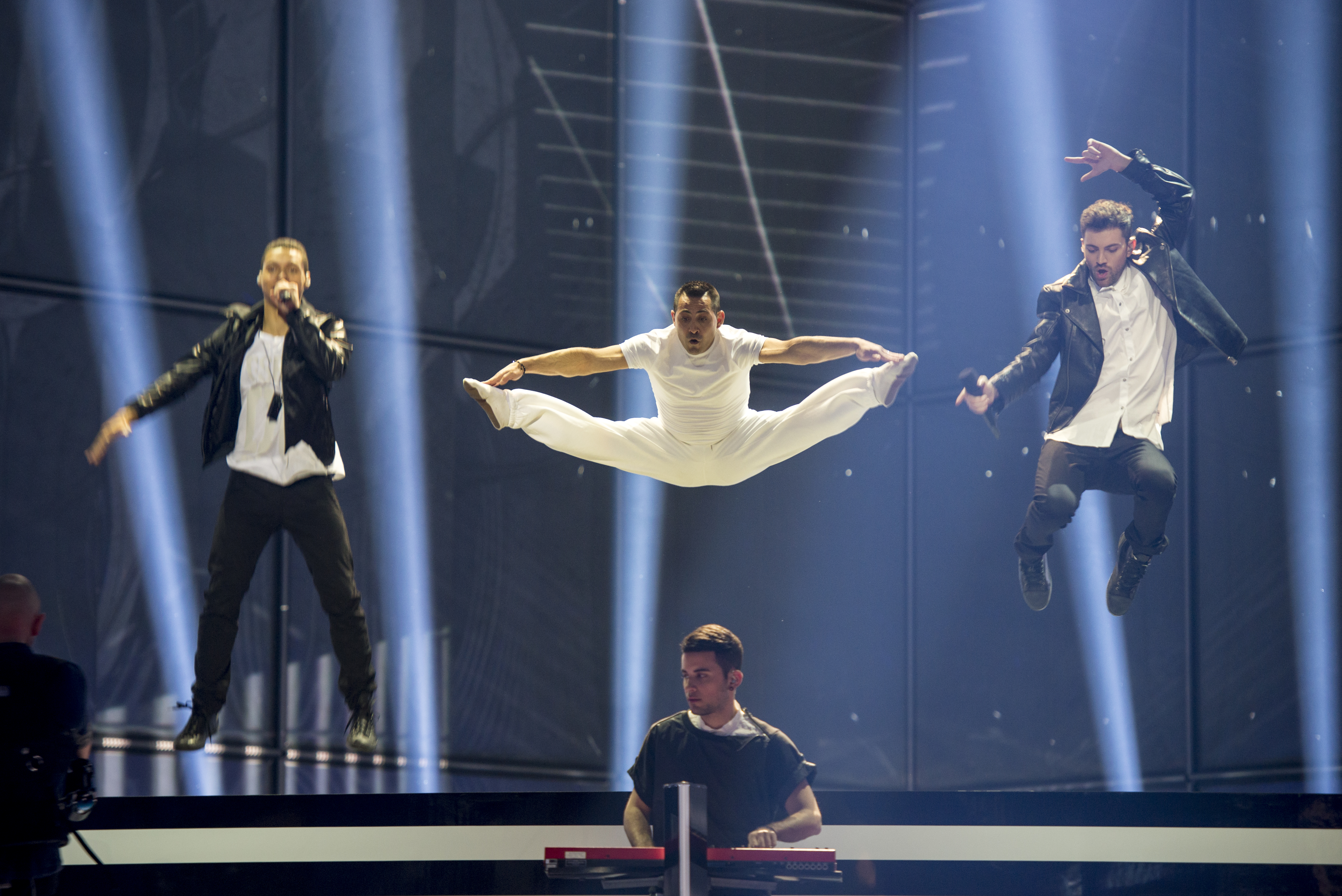
Freaky Fortune and Riskykidd performing the song on the stage of Eurovision Song Contest 2014

On 11 March 2014 Freaky Fortune and Riskykidd participated in the Greek national final for the Eurovision Song Contest 2014. After performing second in Eurosong 2014, "Rise Up" topped the 29% of the jury vote and 45% of the televote, 37% of available votes, winning the right to represent Greece at in Copenhagen, Denmark.

On 20 January 2014, at Copenhagen City Hall, the semi-final allocation draw Greece was assigned to perform in the second semi-final after being drawn from pot 4 of 6.

"Rise Up" was performed 13th in the second semi-final on 8 May 2014. At the end of the broadcast Freaky Fortune and Riskykidd were revealed as one of the 10 qualifiers, earning Greece a spot in the grand final. It was later announced by the EBU that "Rise Up" revieved 74 points, placing 7th in the second semi-final. The international juries ranked the song 9th with 52 points, while the international televote ranked it 5th, giving 91 points.

On 10 May 2014, "Rise Up" was placed 10th in the grand final running order. During the voting sequence, "Rise Up" received a total of 35 points from all, placing 20th out of 26 songs. The song ranked 14th in the public televote and 19th with the international juries.

== Track listing ==
Digital download
| No. | Title | Length |
|---|---|---|
| 1. | "Rise Up" | 3:04 |
| 2. | "Rise Up" (Jazz Version) | 3:20 |

== Credits and personnel ==
- Vocals – Nicolas Raptakis and Shane Schuller
- Lyrics – Nicolas Raptakis, Theofilos Pouzbouris and Shane Schuller
- Composer – Nicolas Raptakis and Theofilos Pouzbouris

== Chart performance ==
| Chart (2014) | Peak position |
|---|---|
| Greece (Billboard) | 4 |
| Sweden (Digilistan) | 32 |
| Austria (Ö3 Austria Top 40) | 67 |
| Ireland (IRMA) | 73 |
| Belgium (Ultratip Bubbling Under Flanders) | 93 |
| UK Singles Chart (Official Charts Company) | 110 |
