= Alcohol Is Free =

2013 song by Koza Mostra and Agathonas Iakovidis

Single by Koza Mostra feat. Agathonas Iakovidis

from the album Keep Up The Rhythm
- Released: February 11, 2013
- Genre: Greek folk; rebetiko; Ska punk
- Length: 2:58
- Label: Platinum Records
- Songwriter: Ilias Kozas
- Producer: Koza Mostra

Koza Mostra singles chronology
"Tora/Me Trela" (2012)	"Alcohol Is Free" (2013)	"Ti Kano Edo" (2013)

Eurovision Song Contest 2013 entry
- Country: Greece
- Artist: Koza Mostra feat. Agathonas Iakovidis
- Languages: English; Greek
- Composer: Ilias Kozas
- Lyricist: Stathis Pahidis

Finals performance
- Semi-final result: 2nd
- Semi-final points: 121
- Final result: 6th
- Final points: 152

Entry chronology
- ◄ "Aphrodisiac" (2012)
- "Rise Up" (2014) ►

Official performance video
- "Alcohol Is Free (Second Semi-Final) on YouTube "Alcohol Is Free (Final) on YouTube

"Alcohol Is Free" is a song performed by Koza Mostra and Agathonas Iakovidis. It was the Greek entry for the Eurovision Song Contest in 2013, where it eventually came 6th at the finals. It was composed as a mix of ska, punk and rebetiko music styles. The song's chorus is sung in English while the rest of it is in Greek. It was performed at Eurovision with the performers wearing kilts. The song also included a number of allusions to the Greek government-debt crisis and a feeling of suffering as a result of it.

== Eurovision ==
At the Eurovision Song Contest, "Alcohol is Free" was placed in the second semi-final where it was performed 9th in the running order. The song was voted through to compete in the final. There it was selected to play 21st in the Eurovision final running order. The song eventually finished 6th in the competition after receiving the maximum of 12 points from Cyprus and San Marino while also receiving high marks from Albania, Armenia, Russia, and the United Kingdom. "Alcohol is Free" was also the highest-ranking song not sung primarily in English.

The song was praised by critics, with the British Daily Mirror newspaper calling it "certifiably brilliant madness". A panel of music critics rated it as 67%. Czech musician Stano Simor criticized its melody as being too similar to Russian folk songs. Neos Kosmos, a Greek-Australian newspaper, opined that "Alcohol is Free" had gained a cult following because it contrasted with Europop music while maintaining Greek folk music.

== Chart performance ==
Chart (2013)	Peak position
Greece Digital Songs (Billboard)	1
Germany (GfK)	85
Netherlands (Single Top 100)	95
UK Independent (Official Charts)	30
