= Margaret Berger discography =

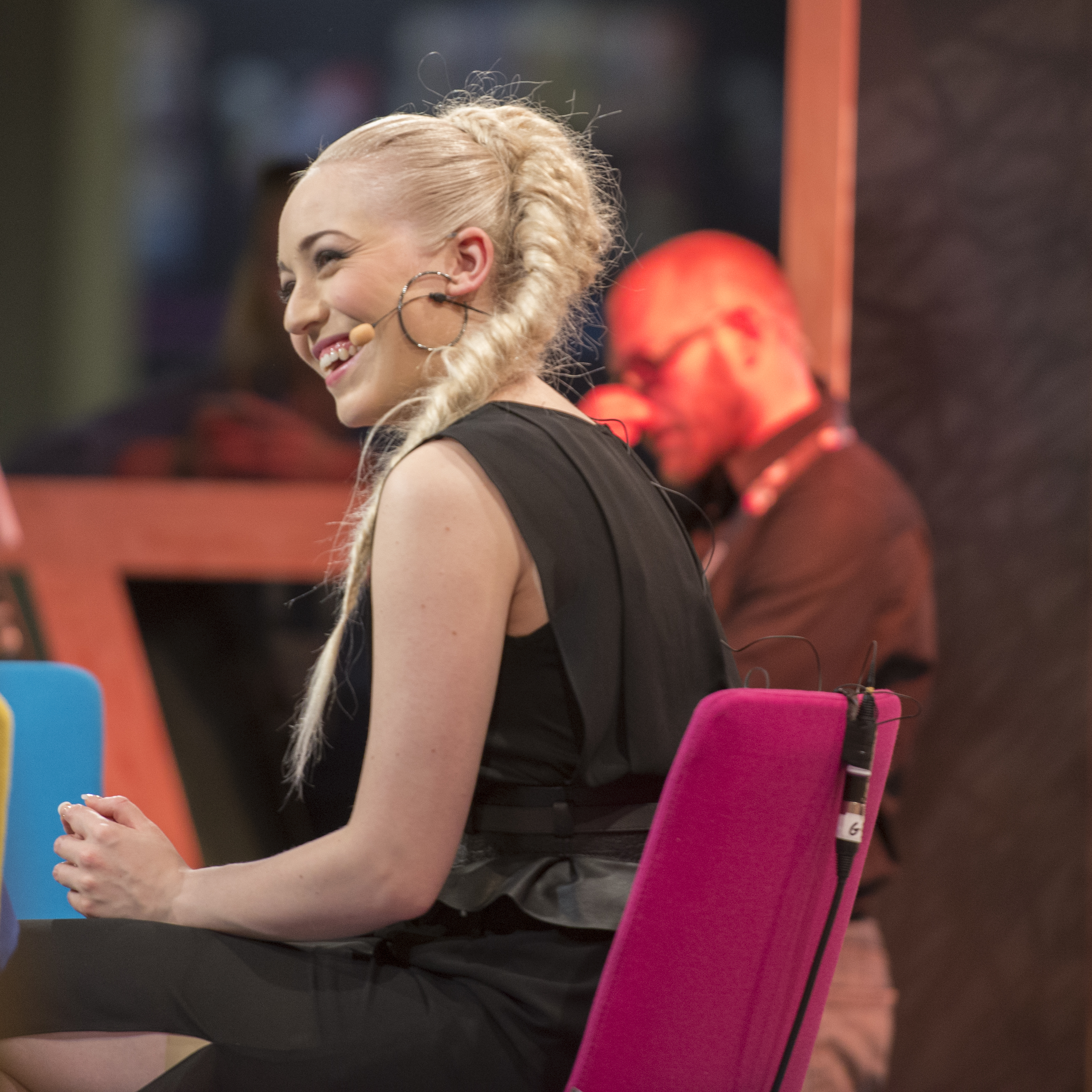
- Margaret Berger at Studio Eurovision in 2013.
- Studio albums: 2
- Singles: 14
- Music videos: 5
- Compilations: 1

The discography of Margaret Berger, a Norwegian electropop singer-songwriter, consists of two studio albums, one compilation album and fourteen singles

Berger's debut album, Chameleon, was released on 4 October 2004. The album reached number four on the Norwegian albums chart. The album did not receive an official single release, but the music video for the song "Lifetime Guarantee" was awarded a Spellemannprisen.

Her second album, Pretty Scary Silver Fairy, was released on 2 October 2006. The album reached number eight in Norway and received positive reviews. Influenced by Björk, Daft Punk and The Knife, the album was a departure from her previous effort, and featured a mixture of electronic and dance-pop music. The lead single, "Samantha", reached number six on Norwegian singles chart. Two more singles followed, "Will You Remember Me Tomorrow?" which has peaked to number 13 on Norwegian singles chart and "Robot Song". On 21 February 2011 Berger released the single "In a Box". In June 2011, her label Sony BMG issued the 4-track EP compilation Four Hits: Margaret Berger, which included the singles "Lifetime Guarantee", "Samantha", "Will You Remember Me Tomorrow?" and "Chameleon".

Berger has represented Norway in the Eurovision Song Contest 2013 second semi-final after winning the Norwegian national final on 9 February with the song "I Feed You My Love". The song has reached number four on Norwegian singles chart. On 18 May 2013 at the finals, Margaret Berger finished at 4th place with 191 points. She is currently recording her third album Chastisement in London, England. The album will include her Eurovision 2013 song, "I Feed You My Love".

== Albums ==
=== Studio albums ===
Title	Album details	Peak chart positions
Title	Album details	NOR
Chameleon	Released: 4 October 2004; Label: BMG Norway; Formats: CD, digital download	4
Pretty Scary Silver Fairy	Released: 2 October 2006; Label: Sony BMG; Formats: CD, digital download	8
"—" denotes album that did not chart or was not released in that territory.

=== Compilation albums ===
Title	Album details
Four Hits: Margaret Berger	Released: June 2011; Label: BMG Norway; Formats: digital download

== Singles ==
=== As lead artist ===
Title	Year	Peak chart positions										Certifications	Album
Title	Year	NOR	AUT	DEN	GER	IRE	NL	SWE	SWI	SCO	UK	Certifications	Album
"Samantha"	2006	6	—	—	—	—	—	—	—	—	—		Pretty Scary Silver Fairy
"Will You Remember Me Tomorrow?"	2006	13	—	—	—	—	—	—	—	—	—		Pretty Scary Silver Fairy
"Robot Song"	2007	—	—	—	—	—	—	—	—	—	—		Pretty Scary Silver Fairy
"In a Box"	2011	—	—	—	—	—	—	—	—	—	—		Non-album singles
"I Feed You My Love"	2013	4	51	36	24	54	49	33	26	82	80	IFPI NOR: Platinum	Non-album singles
"Human Race"	2013	—	—	—	—	—	—	—	—	—	—		Non-album singles
"Scream"	2014	—	—	—	—	—	—	—	—	—	—		Non-album singles
"Apologize"	2016	—	—	—	—	—	—	—	—	—	—		Non-album singles
"Running with Scissors"	2016	—	—	—	—	—	—	—	—	—	—		Non-album singles
"Se Deg"	2020	—	—	—	—	—	—	—	—	—	—		Non-album singles
"Hjertemedisin"	2020	—	—	—	—	—	—	—	—	—	—		Non-album singles
"Gal"	2021	—	—	—	—	—	—	—	—	—	—		Non-album singles
"Gjennomsiktig"	2022	—	—	—	—	—	—	—	—	—	—		Non-album singles
"Oblivion"	2024	—	—	—	—	—	—	—	—	—	—		Non-album singles
"Karma Is A"	2024	—	—	—	—	—	—	—	—	—	—		Songs My Friends Might Wanna Dance To
"Libra Girl"	2024	—	—	—	—	—	—	—	—	—	—		Songs My Friends Might Wanna Dance To
"I Can't Make You Love Me"	2024	—	—	—	—	—	—	—	—	—	—		Songs My Friends Might Wanna Dance To
"—" denotes single that did not chart or was not released in that territory.

== Music videos ==
Year	Title	Director(s)
2004	"Lifetime Guarantee"	Alex Herron
2006	"Samantha"	
2006	"Will You Remember Me Tomorrow?"	
2011	"In a Box"	
2013	"I Feed You My Love"	Robin Lynch and Janna Rean
2013	"I Feed You My Love" (United States version)	
2014	"Scream"	Pål Laukli
2016	"Apologize"	Mia Sundsfjord
