= Norway in the Eurovision Song Contest 2014 =

- Eurovision Song Contest 2014
- Participating broadcaster: Norsk rikskringkasting (NRK)
- Country: Norway
- Selection process: Melodi Grand Prix 2014
- Selection date: 15 March 2014

Competing entry
- Song: "Silent Storm"
- Artist: Carl Espen
- Songwriters: Josefin Winther

Placement
- Semi-final result: Qualified (6th, 77 points)
- Final result: 8th, 88 points

Participation chronology

Norway was represented at the Eurovision Song Contest 2014 with the song "Silent Storm" written by Josefin Winther. The song was performed by Carl Espen. The Norwegian Broadcasting Corporation (NRK) organised the national final Melodi Grand Prix 2013 in order to select the Norwegian entry for the 2014 contest in Copenhagen, Denmark. 15 entries competed in the national final that consisted of three semi-finals and a final. Nine entries ultimately qualified to compete in the final on 15 March 2014 where the winner was determined over two rounds of public televoting. The top four entries in the first round of voting advanced to the competition's second round—the Gold Final. In the second round of public televoting, "Silent Storm" performed by Carl Espen was selected as the winner with 53,712 votes.

Norway was drawn to compete in the second semi-final of the Eurovision Song Contest which took place on 8 May 2014. Performing during the show in position 3, "Silent Storm" was announced among the top 10 entries of the second semi-final and therefore qualified to compete in the final on 12 May. It was later revealed that Norway placed sixth out of the 15 participating countries in the semi-final with 77 points. In the final, Norway performed in position 5 and placed eighth out of the 26 participating countries with 88 points.

== Background ==
Prior to the 2014 contest, Norway had participated in the Eurovision Song Contest 52 times since its first entry in 1960. Norway had won the contest on two occasions: in 1985 with the song "La det swinge" performed by Bobbysocks! and in 1995 with the song "Nocturne" performed by Secret Garden. Norway also had the two dubious distinctions of having finished last in the Eurovision final more than any other country and for having the most "nul points" (zero points) in the contest, the latter being a record the nation shared together with Austria. The country had finished last eleven times and had failed to score a point during four contests. Following the introduction of semi-finals in 2004, Norway has, to this point, finished in the top 10 four times: Wig Wam finished ninth with the song "In My Dreams" in 2005, Maria Haukaas Storeng was fifth in 2008 with "Hold On Be Strong", Alexander Rybak won in 2009, and Margaret Berger finished fourth in 2013 performing "I Feed You My Love".

The Norwegian national broadcaster, Norsk rikskringkasting (NRK), broadcasts the event within Norway and organises the selection process for the nation's entry. NRK confirmed their intentions to participate at the 2014 Eurovision Song Contest on 6 May 2013. The broadcaster has traditionally organised the national final Melodi Grand Prix, which has selected the Norwegian entry for the Eurovision Song Contest in all but one of their participation. Along with their participation confirmation, the broadcaster announced the organization of Melodi Grand Prix 2014 in order to select the 2014 Norwegian entry.

== Before Eurovision ==
=== Melodi Grand Prix 2014 ===
Melodi Grand Prix 2014 was the 52nd edition of the Norwegian national final Melodi Grand Prix and selected Norway's entry for the Eurovision Song Contest 2014. 15 songs were selected to compete in a four-week-long process that commenced on 7 March 2014 and concluded with the final on 15 March 2014. All shows were hosted by Jenny Skavlan and Erik Solbakken and televised on NRK1 as well as streamed online at NRK's official website nrk.no. The final was also broadcast online at the official Eurovision Song Contest website eurovision.tv.

==== Format ====
The competition consisted of four shows: three semi-finals on 7, 8 and 9 March 2014 and a final on 15 March 2014. Five songs competed in each semi-final and the top three entries qualified to the final. The results of all shows were determined exclusively by public televoting. Viewers could cast their votes through SMS voting, while a four-member panel also provided commentary and feedback regarding the competing entries during each of the four shows. The panel consisted of:

- Marie Komissar – NRK P3 radio host and music producer
- Kathrine Synnes Finnskog – manager and director of Music Norway
- Gisle Stokland – editor and owner of the music website 730.no
- Tarjei Strøm – musician and radio host

==== Competing entries ====
A submission period was opened by NRK between 3 July 2013 and 15 September 2013. Songwriters of any nationality were allowed to submit entries, while performers of the selected songs would be chosen by NRK in consultation with the songwriters. In addition to the public call for submissions, NRK reserved the right to directly invite certain artists and composers to compete. At the close of the deadline, approximately 600 submissions were received. 15 songs were selected for the competition by a five-member jury panel consisting of Vivi Stenberg (Melodi Grand Prix music producer), Marie Komissar (NRK P3 radio host and music producer), Kathrine Synnes Finnskog (manager and director of Music Norway), Gisle Stokland (editor and owner of the music website 730.no) and Tarjei Strøm (musician and radio host). The competing acts and songs were revealed on 27 January 2014 during a press conference at the Folketeatret in Oslo, presented by Jenny Skavlan and Erik Solbakken. 15-second clips of the competing entries were released during the press conference, while the songs in their entirety were premiered on 19 February.

Artist	Song	Songwriter(s)
Carl Espen	"Silent Storm"	Josefin Winther
Charlie	"Hit Me Up"	Melanie Fontana, Jon Asher, Lars Hustoft
Cir.Cuz	"Hele verden"	Joakim Harestad Haukaas, Andre Lindal
Dina Misund	"Needs"	Dina Misund, Frode Bjørgmo Strømvik
El Cuero	"Ain't No Love (In This City No More)"	Brynjan Takle Ohr, Bjarte Lund Rolland, Øyvind Blomstrøm, Håvard Takle Ohr
Elisabeth Carew	"Sole Survivor"	Elisabeth Carew, David Eriksen, Simon Climie, Mats Lie Skåre
Hilda and Thea Leora	"Best Friend's Boyfriend"	Martin Kleveland, Lisa Desmond Linder, Jesper Jakobsen
Ilebek	"Who Needs the Universe"	Andreas Ihlebæk
Knut Kippersund Nesdal	"Taste of You"	Magnus Hængsle, Jenny Moe
Linnea Dale	"High Hopes"	Linnea Dale, Kim Bergseth
Martine Marbel	"Right Now"	Martine Marbel, Goran Obad
Mo	"Heal"	Laila Samuelsen
Moi	"Bensin"	Ingjerd Østrem Omland
Oda and Wulff	"Sing"	Christer Wulff
Timbre and Frikk Heide-Steen feat. Ida Stein	"Frozen By Your Love"	Anders Bratterud

==== Semi-finals ====
Five songs competed in each of the three semi-finals that took place on 7, 8 and 9 March 2014 at the Folketeatret in Oslo. The top three advanced to the final from each semi-final.

Semi-final 1 – 7 March 2014
R/O	Artist	Song	Place
1	Hilda and Thea Leora	"Best Friend's Boyfriend"	—
2	Mo	"Heal"	1
3	Dina Misund	"Needs"	3
4	Linnea Dale	"High Hopes"	2
5	Timbre and Frikk Heide-Steen feat. Ida Stein	"Frozen by Your Love"	—

Semi-final 2 – 8 March 2014
R/O	Artist	Song	Place
1	Cir.Cuz	"Hele verden"	—
2	Martine Marbel	"Right Now"	—
3	Oda and Wulff	"Sing"	2
4	Knut Kippersund Nesdal	"Taste of You"	1
5	Charlie	"Hit Me Up"	3

Semi-final 3 – 9 March 2014
R/O	Artist	Song	Place
1	Moi	"Bensin"	5
2	El Cuero	"Ain't No Love (In This City No More)"	2
3	Ilebek	"Who Needs the Universe"	4
4	Elisabeth Carew	"Sole Survivor"	3
5	Carl Espen	"Silent Storm"	1

==== Final ====
Nine songs that qualified from the preceding three semi-finals competed during the final at the Oslo Spektrum in Oslo on 15 March 2014. The winner was selected over two rounds of public televoting. In the first round, the top four entries were selected to proceed to the second round, the Gold Final. In the Gold Final, the results of the public televote were revealed by Norway's five regions and led to the victory of "Silent Storm" performed by Carl Espen with 53,712 votes. In addition to the performances of the competing entries, the show was opened by Ludvig Antonio Jacobsen performing his song "Erre herre er party?", while the interval act featured a medley performed by Karin Park and 2013 Norwegian Eurovision entrant Margaret Berger.

Final – 15 March 2014
R/O	Artist	Song	Result
1	El Cuero	"Ain't No Love (In This City No More)"	—N/a
2	Elisabeth Carew	"Sole Survivor"	—N/a
3	Knut Kippersund Nesdal	"Taste of You"	Advanced
4	Dina Misund	"Needs"	—N/a
5	Mo	"Heal"	Advanced
6	Linnea Dale	"High Hopes"	Advanced
7	Charlie	"Hit Me Up"	—N/a
8	Carl Espen	"Silent Storm"	Advanced
9	Oda and Wulff	"Sing"	—N/a

Gold Final – 15 March 2014
R/O	Artist	Song	Eastern Norway	Northern Norway	Central Norway	Southern Norway	Western Norway	Total	Place
1	Knut Kippersund Nesdal	"Taste of You"	17,440	1,805	3,083	2,039	3,390	27,757	4
2	Carl Espen	"Silent Storm"	23,264	4,697	4,397	4,812	16,542	53,712	1
3	Mo	"Heal"	23,615	3,021	3,181	3,714	3,874	37,405	3
4	Linnea Dale	"High Hopes"	22,746	3,304	3,484	4,832	4,720	39,086	2

=== Promotion ===
Carl Espen made several appearances across Europe to specifically promote "Silent Storm" as the Norwegian Eurovision entry. On 5 April, Espen performed during the Eurovision in Concert event which was held at the Melkweg venue in Amsterdam, Netherlands and hosted by Cornald Maas and Sandra Reemer. On 13 April, Espen performed during the London Eurovision Party, which was held at the Café de Paris venue in London, United Kingdom and hosted by Nicki French and Paddy O'Connell.

== At Eurovision ==
Carl Espen presenting himself and "Silent Storm" at the Eurovision Song Contest 2014

According to Eurovision rules, all nations with the exceptions of the host country and the "Big Five" (France, Germany, Italy, Spain and the United Kingdom) are required to qualify from one of two semi-finals in order to compete for the final; the top ten countries from each semi-final progress to the final. The European Broadcasting Union (EBU) split up the competing countries into six different pots based on voting patterns from previous contests, with countries with favourable voting histories put into the same pot. On 20 January 2014, an allocation draw was held which placed each country into one of the two semi-finals, as well as which half of the show they would perform in. Norway was placed into the second semi-final, to be held on 8 May 2014, and was scheduled to perform in the first half of the show.

Once all the competing songs for the 2014 contest had been released, the running order for the semi-finals was decided by the shows' producers rather than through another draw, so that similar songs were not placed next to each other. Norway was set to perform in position 3, following the entry from Israel and before the entry from Georgia.

In Norway, the two semi-finals and the final were broadcast on NRK1 with commentary by Olav Viksmo-Slettan. An alternative broadcast of the final was also televised on NRK3 with commentary by the hosts of the NRK P3 radio show P3morgen Ronny Brede Aase, Silje Reiten Nordnes and Line Elvsåshagen. The Norwegian spokesperson, who announced the Norwegian votes during the final, was Margrethe Røed.

=== Semi-final ===
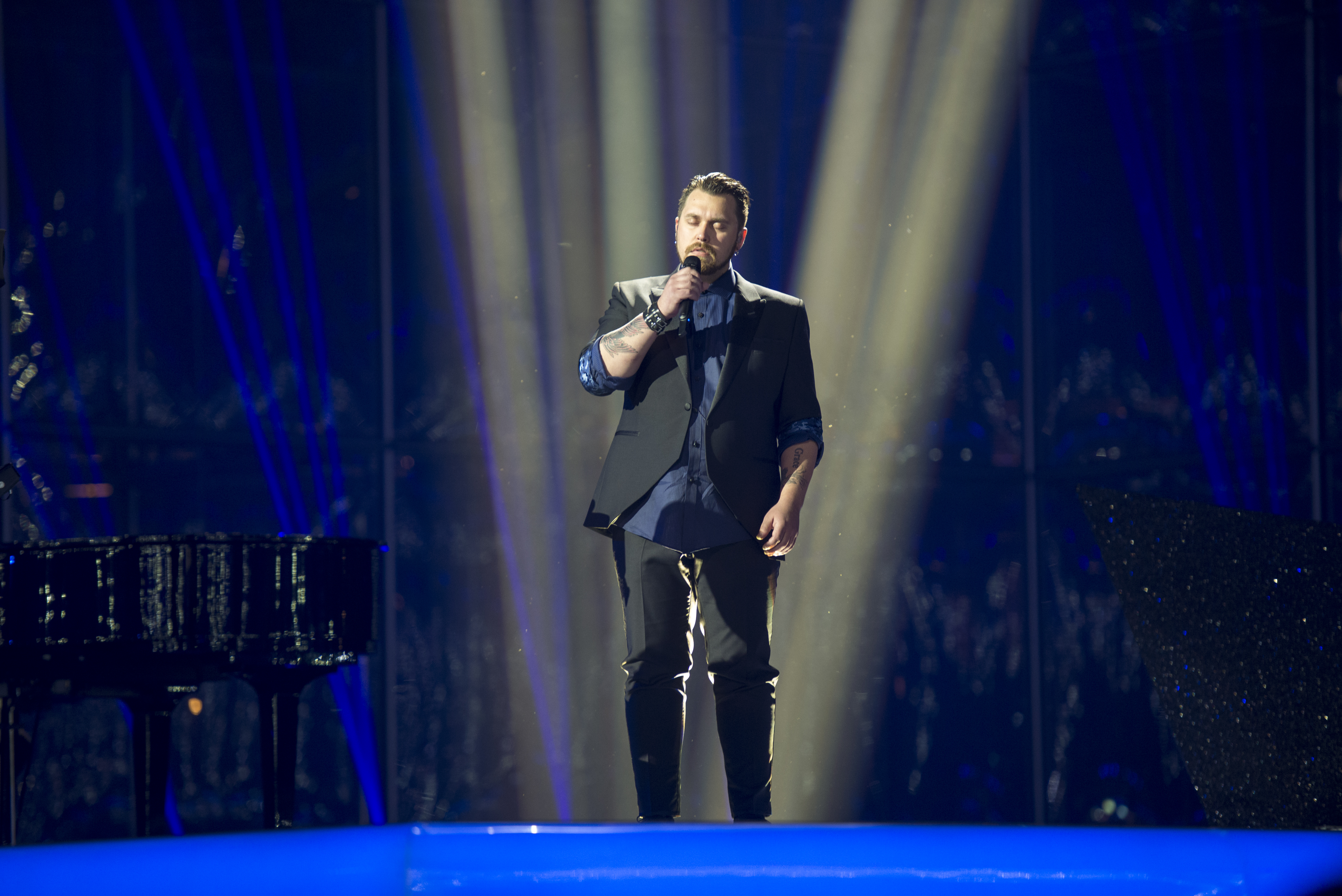
Carl Espen during a rehearsal before the second semi-final

Carl Espen took part in technical rehearsals on 29 April and 3 May, followed by dress rehearsals on 7 and 8 May. This included the jury show on 7 May where the professional juries of each country watched and voted on the competing entries.

The Norwegian performance featured Carl Espen performing on stage in a black suit and blue shirt together with a pianist and four violinists that stood on a sloped pedestal. The stage transitioned from a dark setting with a spotlight on Espen at the beginning of the performance to a brighter scenery before transitioning back to a dark setting with lights centred on Carl Espen at the end. The LED screens displayed dark moving waves, and the performance also featured smoke on the stage floor at the beginning, which later disappeared with the use of a wind machine. The four violinists on stage with Carl Espen were: Ane Emilie Vold Mickelsson, Isa Caroline Holmesland, Madeleine Ossum and Sara Veronika Ulstrup. The pianist was Stian Aarstad.

At the end of the show, Norway was announced as having finished in the top 10 and subsequently qualifying for the grand final. It was later revealed that Norway placed sixth in the semi-final, receiving a total of 77 points.

=== Final ===
Shortly after the second semi-final, a winners' press conference was held for the ten qualifying countries. As part of this press conference, the qualifying artists took part in a draw to determine which half of the grand final they would subsequently participate in. This draw was done in the order the countries were announced during the semi-final. Norway was drawn to compete in the first half. Following this draw, the shows' producers decided upon the running order of the final, as they had done for the semi-finals. Norway was subsequently placed to perform in position 5, following the entry from Iceland and before the entry from Romania.

Carl Espen once again took part in dress rehearsals on 9 and 10 May before the final, including the jury final where the professional juries cast their final votes before the live show. Carl Espen performed a repeat of his semi-final performance during the final on 10 May. Norway placed eighth in the final, scoring 88 points.

=== Voting ===
Voting during the three shows consisted of 50 percent public televoting and 50 percent from a jury deliberation. The jury consisted of five music industry professionals who were citizens of the country they represent, with their names published before the contest to ensure transparency. This jury was asked to judge each contestant based on: vocal capacity; the stage performance; the song's composition and originality; and the overall impression by the act. In addition, no member of a national jury could be related in any way to any of the competing acts in such a way that they cannot vote impartially and independently. The individual rankings of each jury member were released shortly after the grand final.

Following the release of the full split voting by the EBU after the conclusion of the competition, it was revealed that Norway had placed sixteenth with the public televote and ninth with the jury vote in the final. In the public vote, Norway scored 39 points, while with the jury vote, Norway scored 102 points. In the second semi-final, Norway placed eighth with the public televote with 55 points and fourth with the jury vote, scoring 100 points.

Below is a breakdown of points awarded to Norway and awarded by Norway in the second semi-final and grand final of the contest, and the breakdown of the jury voting and televoting conducted during the two shows:

==== Points awarded to Norway ====
Points awarded to Norway (Semi-final 2)
Score	Country
12 points	
10 points	Finland
8 points	Ireland; Lithuania
7 points	Germany; Greece; Malta
6 points	Poland
5 points	Austria; Georgia
4 points	Macedonia; Romania; Slovenia
3 points	
2 points	Switzerland
1 point	

Points awarded to Norway (Final)
Score	Country
12 points	
10 points	Netherlands
8 points	Lithuania
7 points	Finland; Ireland; Poland
6 points	Denmark
5 points	Germany; Latvia; Slovenia; Switzerland
4 points	Belarus
3 points	Estonia; Greece; Portugal; Sweden
2 points	France; Malta
1 point	Austria; Iceland; Romania

==== Points awarded by Norway ====
Points awarded by Norway (Semi-final 2)
Score	Country
12 points	Finland
10 points	Romania
8 points	Austria
7 points	Poland
6 points	Greece
5 points	Lithuania
4 points	Slovenia
3 points	Ireland
2 points	Malta
1 point	Belarus

Points awarded by Norway (Final)
Score	Country
12 points	Netherlands
10 points	Austria
8 points	Sweden
7 points	Finland
6 points	Iceland
5 points	Spain
4 points	Romania
3 points	United Kingdom
2 points	Poland
1 point	Denmark

==== Detailed voting results ====
The following members comprised the Norwegian jury:

- Ahmed Ashraf (jury chairperson) – music and culture journalist
- Jonas Brenna – Head of publishing
- Jan Holmlund – entertainment journalist
- Rannveig Sundelin – vocalist
- Monica Johansen – artist, songwriter, DJ

Detailed voting results from Norway (Semi-final 2)
R/O	Country	A. Ashraf	J. Brenna	J. Holmlund	R. Sundelin	M. Johansen	Jury Rank	Televote Rank	Combined Rank	Points
01	Malta	8	6	12	2	8	9	8	9	2
02	Israel	7	10	1	5	9	7	12	11	
03	Norway									
04	Georgia	14	14	13	14	14	14	14	14	
05	Poland	5	7	8	9	7	8	2	4	7
06	Austria	10	2	2	7	6	5	3	3	8
07	Lithuania	13	12	10	6	12	11	1	6	5
08	Finland	1	8	5	1	2	3	4	1	12
09	Ireland	11	9	9	12	11	10	7	8	3
10	Belarus	12	11	14	11	13	13	6	10	1
11	Macedonia	3	5	7	10	5	6	13	12	
12	Switzerland	9	13	11	13	10	12	9	13	
13	Greece	2	3	3	3	3	1	10	5	6
14	Slovenia	4	4	6	8	4	4	11	7	4
15	Romania	6	1	4	4	1	2	5	2	10

Detailed voting results from Norway (Final)
R/O	Country	A. Ashraf	J. Brenna	J. Holmlund	R. Sundelin	M. Johansen	Jury Rank	Televote Rank	Combined Rank	Points
01	Ukraine	9	21	15	17	15	16	13	15	
02	Belarus	19	23	23	21	24	23	14	20	
03	Azerbaijan	14	5	18	15	12	13	25	22	
04	Iceland	7	13	22	6	8	11	6	5	6
05	Norway									
06	Romania	20	4	11	11	2	10	8	7	4
07	Armenia	21	15	25	20	22	21	15	18	
08	Montenegro	8	9	8	16	20	12	24	19	
09	Poland	11	20	12	23	17	19	1	9	2
10	Greece	5	12	2	10	4	6	17	12	
11	Austria	16	1	1	7	7	4	2	2	10
12	Germany	18	16	13	14	16	17	16	17	
13	Sweden	6	2	4	4	5	2	4	3	8
14	France	15	19	9	24	14	18	20	21	
15	Russia	24	24	17	22	23	24	19	23	
16	Italy	25	22	21	19	21	22	23	24	
17	Slovenia	2	7	10	13	10	7	21	13	
18	Finland	3	14	7	5	1	3	7	4	7
19	Spain	10	3	5	3	11	5	12	6	5
20	Switzerland	22	17	20	25	18	20	9	14	
21	Hungary	12	8	14	12	19	14	18	16	
22	Malta	13	6	16	1	9	9	11	11	
23	Denmark	17	18	24	8	6	15	5	10	1
24	Netherlands	1	11	3	2	3	1	3	1	12
25	San Marino	23	25	19	18	25	25	22	25	
26	United Kingdom	4	10	6	9	13	8	10	8	3
