= Karin Parke =

Karin Parke may refer to:

- Karin Parke, protagonist of Hated in the Nation Black Mirror TV episode
- Karin Park, Swedish-Norwegian singer-songwriter

== See also ==
- Karen Park (disambiguation)
