= Karen Park =

Karen Park may refer to:

- Karen Park, Pretoria
- Karen Park, Nebraska

== See also ==
- Karin Park (disambiguation)
