= Margaret Berger =

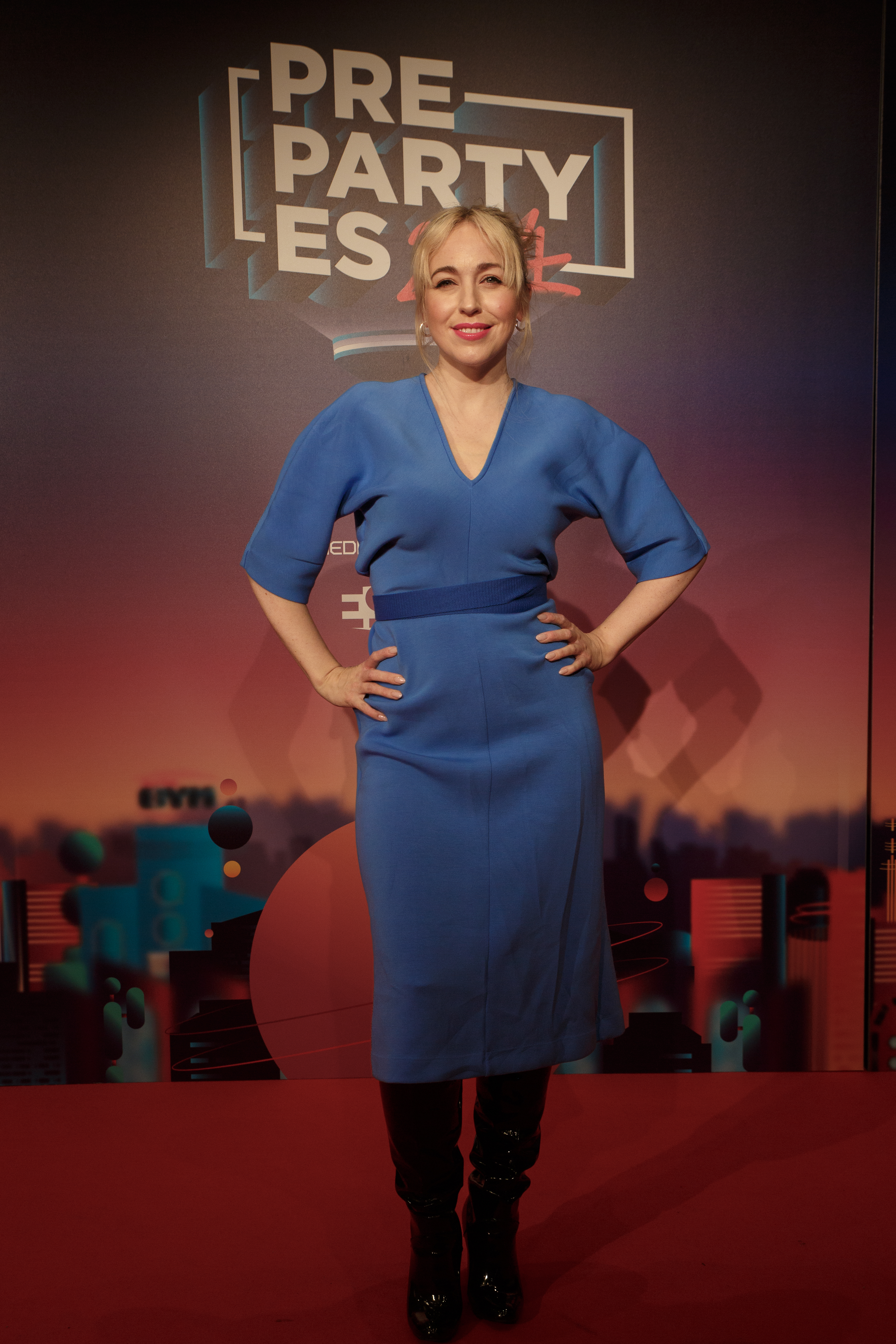
- Berger in 2024

Background information
- Born: 11 October 1985 (age 40); Trondheim, Norway
- Origin: Hitra Municipality, Sør-Trøndelag, Norway
- Genres: Electropop; electronic; electronica
- Occupations: Singer; songwriter; music director; DJ
- Years active: 2004–present
- Labels: Sony BMG; Ultra
- Website: margaretberger.no

Margaret Berger (born 11 October 1985) is a Norwegian singer, songwriter, music director, and DJ. She made her debut on Sony BMG after she placed second on the second season of Norwegian Idol in 2004.

She released the studio albums Chameleon (2004) and Pretty Scary Silver Fairy (2006). Berger represented Norway in the Eurovision Song Contest 2013 in Malmö, Sweden, finishing in fourth place with the song "I Feed You My Love".

== Biography ==
=== Early years ===
Margaret Berger was born on 11 October 1985 in Trondheim and grew up in Hitra Municipality, where she lived for twelve years. She sang in a gospel choir and began writing her own songs at the age of twelve. Berger studied music at Heimdal videregående skole. She made her debut as a lyricist with the local band Slim Void with the song "In Company With Bottles" on their album Slim Void released on a local label.

=== 2004: Idol ===
In 2004, Berger participated in the second season of Idol: Jakten på en superstjerne. She advanced to the top 50, and competed in the semi-finals. She did not make it through in her initial semi-final round, where she lost to Maria Haukaas Storeng and Kjartan Salvesen (the eventual winner). However, she received a call-back for the wildcards from the judge Anneli Drecker, who said that Margaret was one of her favorite contestants. She received the most votes with her rendition of The Beatles' "Come Together" thus advancing to the top 11 alongside fellow contestant Susanne Nordboe.

==== Performances on Idol ====
Week	Theme	Song performed	Original artist	Order	Result
Audition	Auditioner's choice	"Your House"	Alanis Morissette	N/A	Advanced
Semi-finals	N/A	"Were You Worth My Tears?"	Margaret Berger	N/A	Eliminated
Semi-finals (Wildcard)	N/A	"Come Together"	The Beatles	N/A	Safe
Top 11	Favorite artist	"Forgiven"	Alanis Morissette	N/A	Safe
Top 9	Norwegian hits	"Splitter Pine"	DumDum Boys	N/A	Bottom three
Top 8	Disco	"Don't Leave Me This Way"	Harold Melvin & the Blue Notes	N/A	Bottom three
Top 7	Year they were born	"Walking on Sunshine"	Katrina and the Waves	N/A	Bottom three
Top 6	VG-lista top 20 top 5 hits	"Murder on the Dancefloor"	Sophie Ellis-Bextor	N/A	Safe
Top 5	Big band	"It's Oh So Quiet"	Betty Hutton	N/A	Bottom two
Top 4	Songs of the cinema	"Queen of the Night" "Uninvited"	Whitney Houston; Alanis Morissette	N/A	Safe
Top 3	Judges' choice	"It's My Life" "Stop"	Talk Talk; Sam Brown	2; 5	Safe
Top 2	Contestant's choice Contestant's choice Winner's single	"Come Together" "Forgiven" "Standing Tall"	The Beatles; Alanis Morissette; Kjartan Salvesen	1; 3; 5	Runner-up

=== 2004–2005: Chameleon ===
Berger's debut album, Chameleon, was released on 4 October 2004. The album reached number four on the Norwegian albums chart. According to AllMusic's review of the album, "its ten tracks seem to snatch indiscriminately from rock, dance, R&B, and electro, though the cumulative effect is less of a hodgepodge than a harmonious cohabitation of electronic beats and rock guitars, within a plush, polished pop context, in a manner that hasn't been particularly prevalent (in mainstream music anyway) since the '80s".

The album did not receive an official single release, but the music video for the song "Lifetime Guarantee" was awarded a Spellemannprisen.

=== 2006–2010: Pretty Scary Silver Fairy ===
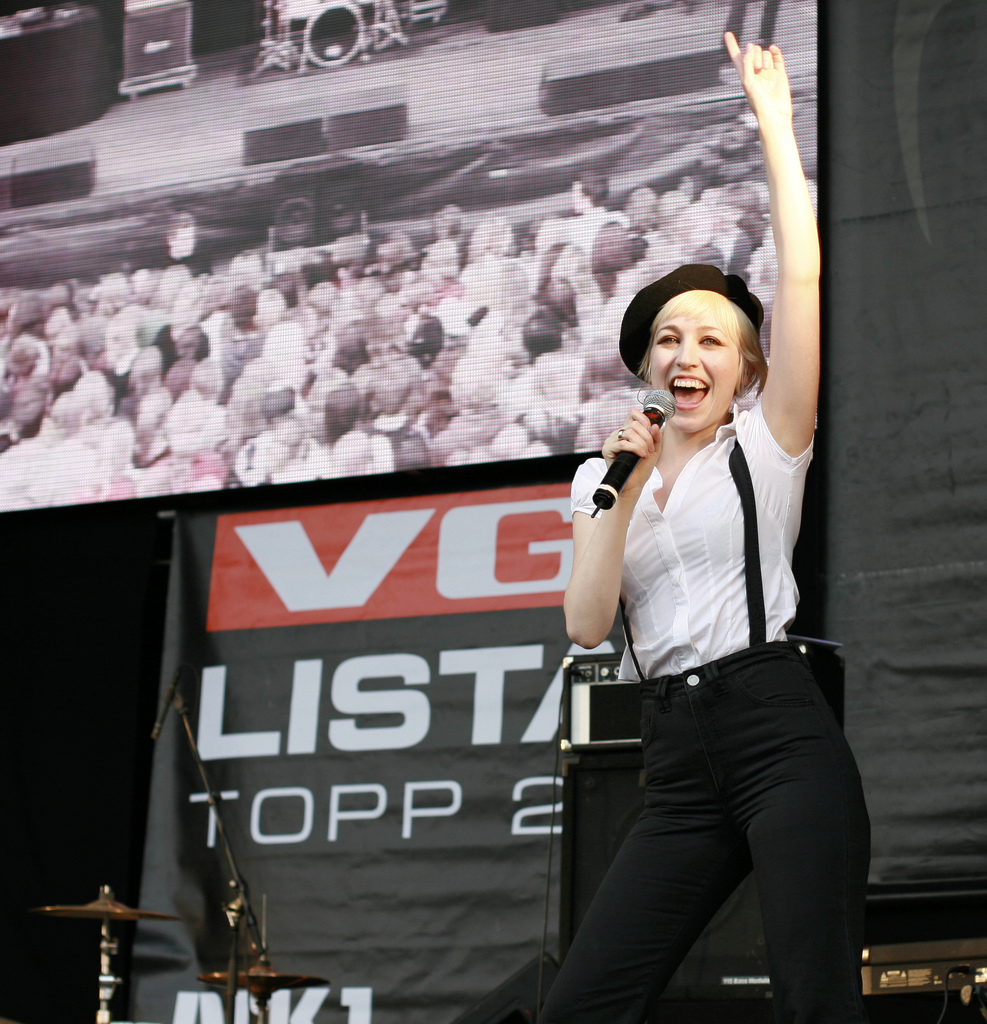
Berger performing live in 2006

Her second album, Pretty Scary Silver Fairy, was released on 2 October 2006. The album reached number eight in Norway and received positive reviews. Influenced by Björk, Daft Punk and The Knife, the album was a departure from her previous effort, and featured a mixture of electronic and dance-pop music.

The lead single, "Samantha", reached number six on the Norwegian singles chart. Its lyrics discuss women who change themselves to please others. Two more singles followed: "Will You Remember Me Tomorrow?" (which peaked at number 13 on the Norwegian singles chart) and "Robot Song".

In 2008, Berger became the music director of NRK P3, one of the three nationwide radio channels of the Norwegian Broadcasting Corporation.

=== 2011–2012: Four Hits: Margaret Berger ===
On 21 February 2011, Berger released the single "In a Box" on Universal Music. This single included the B-side "4-E.V.E.R. L.O.V.E".

In June 2011, her label Sony BMG issued the 4-track EP compilation Four Hits: Margaret Berger, which included the singles "Lifetime Guarantee", "Samantha", "Will You Remember Me Tomorrow?" and "Chameleon".

=== 2013–present: Eurovision Song Contest 2013 ===
Berger represented Norway at the Eurovision Song Contest 2013 with the song "I Feed You My Love" after winning the Norwegian national final on 9 February 2013. The song, written by Karin Park and MachoPsycho, reached number four on the Norwegian singles chart. On 18 May, Margaret Berger finished in 4th place with 191 points—Norway's best result at the contest since their victory in 2009, and their sixth best result ever.

In 2013, Berger stated that she was recording a third studio album, titled New Religion, in Gothenburg, Sweden. The album was set to include her Eurovision 2013 song, "I Feed You My Love", as well as a collaboration with Swedish indie-pop group Lo-Fi-Fnk. On 28 August 2013 she announced the second single "Human Race" on Instagram. The single was released on 6 September. In an interview with So So Gay she announced that the album would be released in February 2014. This release date was later pushed back. On 14 March 2014, the third single from the album, "Scream", was released. She was one of the five jurors for Norway in the Eurovision Song Contest 2015 in Vienna, Austria. In December 2015 she announced her single "Apologize" on Instagram, which was later released on 22 January 2016.

Berger took part in Melodi Grand Prix 2024 with the song "Oblivion". She advanced from her semi-final on 13 January 2024, placing 7th in the final with 49 points.

== Discography ==
- Chameleon (2004)
- Pretty Scary Silver Fairy (2006)

Awards and achievements
Preceded by Tooji with "Stay"	Norway in the Eurovision Song Contest; 2013	Succeeded by Carl Espen with "Silent Storm"
