= Norway in the Eurovision Song Contest 2013 =

- Eurovision Song Contest 2013
- Participating broadcaster: Norsk rikskringkasting (NRK)
- Country: Norway
- Selection process: Melodi Grand Prix 2013
- Selection date: 9 February 2013

Competing entry
- Song: "I Feed You My Love"
- Artist: Margaret Berger
- Songwriters: Karin Park; Niklas Olovson; Robin Lynch

Placement
- Semi-final result: Qualified (3rd, 120 points)
- Final result: 4th, 191 points

Participation chronology

Norway was represented at the Eurovision Song Contest 2013 with the song "I Feed You My Love" written by Karin Park, Robin Lynch and Niklas Olovson. The song was performed by Margaret Berger. The Norwegian Broadcasting Corporation (NRK) organised the national final Melodi Grand Prix 2013 in order to select the Norwegian entry for the 2013 contest in Malmö, Sweden. 21 entries competed in the national final that consisted of three semi-finals and a final. Ten entries ultimately qualified to compete in the final on 9 February 2013 where the winner was determined over two rounds of voting. In the first round of voting, a public televote exclusively selected the top four entries to advance to the competition's second round—the Gold Final. In the second round of voting, "I Feed You My Love" performed by Margaret Berger was selected as the winner following the combination of votes from three regional jury groups and a public vote.

Norway was drawn to compete in the second semi-final of the Eurovision Song Contest which took place on 16 May 2013. Performing during the show in position 13, "I Feed You My Love" was announced among the top 10 entries of the second semi-final and therefore qualified to compete in the final on 18 May. It was later revealed that Norway placed third out of the 17 participating countries in the semi-final with 120 points. In the final, Norway performed in position 24 and placed fourth out of the 26 participating countries with 191 points.

== Background ==
Prior to the 2013 contest, Norway had participated in the Eurovision Song Contest 51 times since its first entry in 1960. Norway had won the contest on two occasions: in 1985 with the song "La det swinge" performed by Bobbysocks! and in 1995 with the song "Nocturne" performed by Secret Garden. Norway also had the two dubious distinctions of having finished last in the Eurovision final more than any other country and for having the most "nul points" (zero points) in the contest, the latter being a record the nation shared together with Austria. The country had finished last eleven times and had failed to score a point during four contests. Following the introduction of semi-finals in 2004, Norway has, to this point, finished in the top 10 three times: Wig Wam finished ninth with the song "In My Dreams" in 2005, Maria Haukaas Storeng was fifth in 2008 with "Hold On Be Strong", and Alexander Rybak won in 2009.

The Norwegian national broadcaster, Norsk rikskringkasting (NRK), broadcasts the event within Norway and organises the selection process for the nation's entry. NRK confirmed their intentions to participate at the 2013 Eurovision Song Contest on 1 July 2012. The broadcaster has traditionally organised the national final Melodi Grand Prix, which has selected the Norwegian entry for the Eurovision Song Contest in all but one of their participation. Along with their participation confirmation, the broadcaster revealed details regarding their selection procedure and announced the organization of Melodi Grand Prix 2013 in order to select the 2013 Norwegian entry.

== Before Eurovision ==
=== Melodi Grand Prix 2013 ===
Melodi Grand Prix 2013 was the 51st edition of the Norwegian national final Melodi Grand Prix and selected Norway's entry for the Eurovision Song Contest 2013. 21 songs were selected to compete in a four-week-long process that commenced on 19 January 2013 and concluded with the final on 9 February 2013. Vivi Stenberg was assigned as the new music producer for the competition, replacing Per Sundnes who held the position since 2007. All shows were hosted by Jenny Skavlan and Erik Solbakken and televised on NRK1 as well as streamed online at NRK's official website nrk.no. The final was also broadcast online at the official Eurovision Song Contest website eurovision.tv.

==== Format ====
The competition consisted of four shows: three semi-finals on 19 January 2013, 26 January 2013 and 2 February 2013 and a final on 9 February 2013. Seven songs competed in each semi-final and the top three entries qualified to the final. The results of the semi-finals were determined exclusively by public televoting, while a jury also awarded one of the eliminated acts a wildcard to proceed to the final. The results in the final were determined by jury voting and public televoting. Viewers could cast their votes through telephone and SMS voting.

==== Competing entries ====
A submission period was opened by NRK between 1 July 2012 and 1 September 2012. Songwriters of any nationality were allowed to submit entries, while performers of the selected songs would be chosen by NRK in consultation with the songwriters. In addition to the public call for submissions, NRK reserved the right to directly invite certain artists and composers to compete. At the close of the deadline, 600 submissions were received. 21 songs were selected for the competition by a jury panel consisting of Vivi Stenberg (Melodi Grand Prix music producer), Kristin Winsents (NRK music journalist and NRK P2 radio host), Gisle Stokland (editor and owner of the music website 730.no), Christine Dancke (DJ, NRK P3 radio host and Blå booking manager) as well as representatives of NRK and the production company EyeworksDinamo. The seven acts and songs competing in each semi-final were revealed on 16, 23 and 30 January 2013, respectively, during the special show MGP Direkte, presented by Jenny Skavlan and Erik Solbakken and broadcast via NRK1 and online at nrk.no.

Artist	Song	Songwriter(s)
Adelén	"Bombo"	Ina Wroldsen, Quiz & Larossi
Anina	"The Young"	Anine Stang, Mattias Frändå, Johan Åsgärde
Annsofi	"I'm With You"	Alexander Rybak
Carina Dahl	"Sleepwalking"	Carina Dahl, Ben Adams, Søren Pagh
Datarock	"The Underground"	Fredrik Saroea, Pål Myran-Håland
Fjellfolk	"Ulvetuva"	Trym Bjønnes
Gaute Ormåsen	"Awake"	Gaute Ormåsen, Fredrik Borgen, Jesper Borgen
Gothminister	"Utopia"	Bjørn Alexander Brem
Gromth feat. Emil Solli-Tangen	"Alone"	Gromth, Emil Solli-Tangen, Sven Atle Kopperud
Haji	"Shine With Me"	Haji, Morad Aziman
Hank	"No One"	Josefin Winther, Magnus Åserud Skylstad
Julie Bergan	"Give a Little Something Back"	Ben Adams, Sara Skjoldnes, Julie Bergan
Lucky Lips	"Sweet and Heavy"	Malin Pettersen
Martin Blomvik	"Det vakje mi tid"	Martin Blomvik, Bjørn Johan Muri, Mats Weinholdt
Margaret Berger	"I Feed You My Love"	Karin Park, Robin Lynch, Niklas Olovson
Mimi Blix	"Catch Me"	Dr. Shiver, Luca Monticelli, Mauro Cottini, Mimi Blix
Shackles	"On Hold"	Silya Nymoen, KeiOne, John Lundvik
Sirkus Eliassen	"I Love You Te Quiero"	Magnus Eliassen, Erik Eliassen
Tom Hugo	"Det er du"	Tom Hugo Hermansen
Vidar Busk	"Paid My Way"	Tim Scott McConnell, Vidar Busk
Winta	"Not Afraid"	Beyond 51, Winta Efrem

==== Semi-finals ====
Seven songs competed in each of the three semi-finals that took place on 19 January, 26 January, and 2 February 2013. The first semi-final took place at the Campus Steinkjer in Steinkjer, the second semi-final took place at the Florø Idrettssenter in Florø, and the third semi-final took place at the Arena Larvik in Larvik. The top three advanced to the final from each semi-final, and "Sweet and Heavy" performed by Lucky Lips was announced on 4 February 2013 to have received the jury wildcard to also proceed to the final.

Semi-final 1 – 19 January 2013
R/O	Artist	Song	Place	Result
1	Vidar Busk	"Paid My Way"	3	Advanced
2	Carina Dahl	"Sleepwalking"	—	—N/a
3	Tom Hugo	"Det er du"	—	—N/a
4	Gromth feat. Emil Solli-Tangen	"Alone"	1	Advanced
5	Julie Bergan	"Give a Little Something Back"	—	—N/a
6	Mimi Blix	"Catch Me"	—	—N/a
7	Datarock	"The Underground"	2	Advanced

Semi-final 2 – 26 January 2013
R/O	Artist	Song	Place	Result
1	Martin Blomvik	"Det vakje mi tid"	—	—N/a
2	Annsofi	"I'm With You"	3	Advanced
3	Shackles	"On Hold"	—	—N/a
4	Hank	"No One"	—	—N/a
5	Fjellfolk	"Ulvetuva"	2	Advanced
6	Haji	"Shine With Me"	—	—N/a
7	Margaret Berger	"I Feed You My Love"	1	Advanced

Semi-final 3 – 2 February 2013
R/O	Artist	Song	Place	Result
1	Gothminister	"Utopia"	—	—N/a
2	Adelén	"Bombo"	1	Advanced
3	Lucky Lips	"Sweet and Heavy"	—	Wildcard
4	Gaute Ormåsen	"Awake"	3	Advanced
5	Anina	"The Young"	—	—N/a
6	Winta	"Not Afraid"	—	—N/a
7	Sirkus Eliassen	"I Love You Te Quiero"	2	Advanced

==== Final ====
Ten songs that qualified from the preceding three semi-finals competed during the final at the Oslo Spektrum in Oslo on 9 February 2013. The winner was selected over two rounds of voting. In the first round, the top four entries were selected by public televoting to proceed to the second round, the Gold Final. In the Gold Final, three regional juries from the three semi-final host cities each distributed points as follows: 1,000, 2,000, 3,000 and 4,000 points. The results of the public televote were then revealed by Norway's five regions and added to the jury scores, leading to the victory of "I Feed You My Love" performed by Margaret Berger with 102,032 votes. In addition to the performances of the competing entries, the interval acts featured 2012 Norwegian Eurovision entrant Tooji performing his entry "Stay", and Swedish Eurovision Song Contest 2012 winner Loreen performing her song "My Heart Is Refusing Me".

Final – 9 February 2013
R/O	Artist	Song	Result
1	Vidar Busk	"Paid My Way"	—N/a
2	Fjellfolk	"Ulvetuva"	—N/a
3	Adelén	"Bombo"	Advanced
4	Gromth feat. Emil Solli-Tangen	"Alone"	—N/a
5	Gaute Ormåsen	"Awake"	—N/a
6	Lucky Lips	"Sweet and Heavy"	—N/a
7	Datarock	"The Underground"	—N/a
8	Annsofi	"I'm With You"	Advanced
9	Margaret Berger	"I Feed You My Love"	Advanced
10	Sirkus Eliassen	"I Love You Te Quiero"	Advanced

Gold Final – 9 February 2013
R/O	Artist	Song	Jury	Televote	Total	Place
1	Adelén	"Bombo"	6,000	53,414	59,414	2
2	Annsofi	"I'm With You"	6,000	25,226	31,226	4
3	Margaret Berger	"I Feed You My Love"	12,000	90,032	102,032	1
4	Sirkus Eliassen	"I Love You Te Quiero"	6,000	35,447	41,447	3

Detailed regional jury votes
R/O	Song	Steinkjer	Florø	Larvik	Total
1	"Bombo"	2,000	1,000	3,000	6,000
2	"I'm With You"	1,000	3,000	2,000	6,000
3	"I Feed You My Love"	4,000	4,000	4,000	12,000
4	"I Love You Te Quiero"	3,000	2,000	1,000	6,000
Spokespersons
Steinkjer – Jamil Kvitvang; Florø – ?; Larvik – Jane Løken

Detailed regional televoting results
R/O	Song	Central	North	West	South	East	Total
1	"Bombo"	6,410	1,032	8,226	11,907	25,839	53,414
2	"I'm With You"	2,828	308	3,350	5,223	13,517	25,226
3	"I Feed You My Love"	15,105	900	14,558	16,621	42,848	90,032
4	"I Love You Te Quiero"	5,694	2,254	4,877	7,342	15,280	35,447
Spokespersons
Central Norway – Carina Dahl; Northern Norway – Anina; Western Norway – Martin Blomvik; Southern Norway – Shackles; Eastern Norway – Julie Bergan

==== Ratings ====
Viewing figures by show
Show	Date	Viewers	Ref.
Semi-final 1	19 January 2013	752,000	
Semi-final 2	26 January 2013	666,000	
Semi-final 3	2 February 2013	677,000	
Final	9 February 2013	975,000	

== At Eurovision ==
According to Eurovision rules, all nations with the exceptions of the host country and the "Big Five" (France, Germany, Italy, Spain and the United Kingdom) are required to qualify from one of two semi-finals in order to compete for the final; the top ten countries from each semi-final progress to the final. The European Broadcasting Union (EBU) split up the competing countries into six different pots based on voting patterns from previous contests, with countries with favourable voting histories put into the same pot. On 17 January 2013, a special allocation draw was held which placed each country into one of the two semi-finals, as well as which half of the show they would perform in. Norway was placed into the second semi-final, to be held on 16 May 2013, and was scheduled to perform in the second half of the show.

Once all the competing songs for the 2013 contest had been released, the running order for the semi-finals was decided by the shows' producers rather than through another draw, so that similar songs were not placed next to each other. Norway was set to perform in position 13, following the entry from Hungary and before the entry from Albania.

In Norway, the two semi-finals and the final were broadcast on NRK1 with commentary by Olav Viksmo-Slettan. An alternative broadcast of the final was also televised on NRK3 with commentary by the hosts of the NRK P3 radio show P3morgen Ronny Brede Aase, Silje Reiten Nordnes and Yngve Hustad Reite. The Norwegian spokesperson, who announced the Norwegian votes during the final, was Tooji who represented Norway in 2012.

=== Semi-final ===
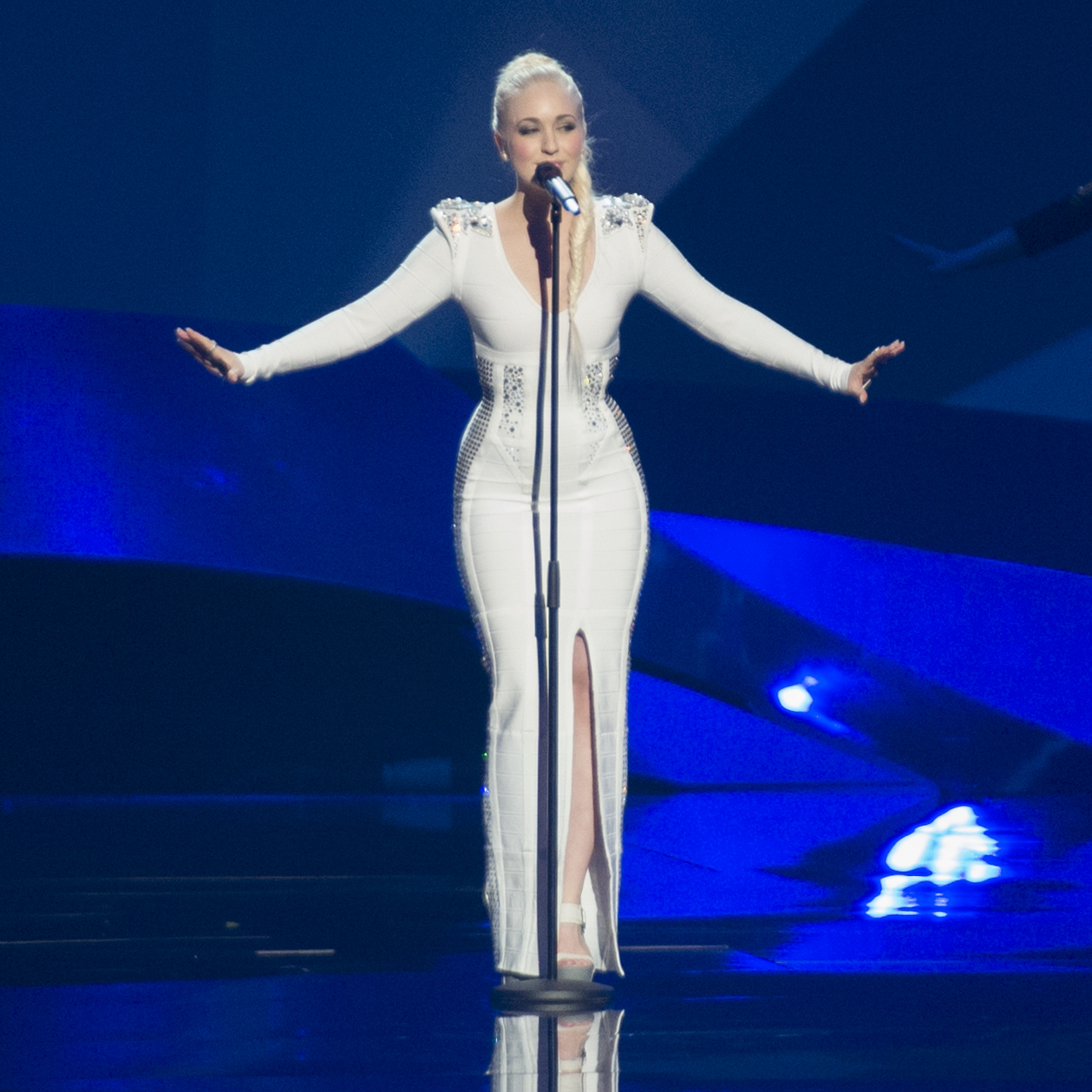
Margaret Berger during a rehearsal before the second semi-final

Margaret Berger took part in technical rehearsals on 9 and 11 May, followed by dress rehearsals on 15 and 16 May. This included the jury show on 15 May where the professional juries of each country watched and voted on the competing entries.

The Norwegian performance featured Margaret Berger performing on stage in a white dress with sequins flanked by a drummer on the left side of the stage and three backing vocalists on the right side. The stage colours were predominantly blue and white with the use of spotlights and strobe lighting, and the LED screens displayed highly charged white noise images. The drummer on stage with Margaret Berger was Axel Tidemann, while the three backing vocalists were: Jorunn Hauge, May Kristin Kaspersen and Nicoline Berg Kaasin.

At the end of the show, Norway was announced as having finished in the top 10 and subsequently qualifying for the grand final. It was later revealed that Norway placed third in the semi-final, receiving a total of 120 points.

=== Final ===
Shortly after the second semi-final, a winners' press conference was held for the ten qualifying countries. As part of this press conference, the qualifying artists took part in a draw to determine which half of the grand final they would subsequently participate in. This draw was done in the order the countries appeared in the semi-final running order. Norway was drawn to compete in the second half. Following this draw, the shows' producers decided upon the running order of the final, as they had done for the semi-finals. Norway was subsequently placed to perform in position 24, following the entry from Italy and before the entry from Georgia.

Margaret Berger once again took part in dress rehearsals on 17 and 18 May before the final, including the jury final where the professional juries cast their final votes before the live show. Margaret Berger performed a repeat of her semi-final performance during the final on 18 May. At the conclusion of the voting, Norway finished in fourth place with 191 points.

=== Voting ===
Voting during the three shows consisted of 50 percent public televoting and 50 percent from a jury deliberation. The jury consisted of five music industry professionals who were citizens of the country they represent. This jury was asked to judge each contestant based on: vocal capacity; the stage performance; the song's composition and originality; and the overall impression by the act. In addition, no member of a national jury could be related in any way to any of the competing acts in such a way that they cannot vote impartially and independently. The following members comprised the Norwegian jury: Suzanne Sumbundu, Henning Solvang, Martine Maribel Furulund, Simone Eriksrud and Harald Sommerstad.

Following the release of the full split voting by the EBU after the conclusion of the competition, it was revealed that Norway had placed sixth with the public televote and fourth with the jury vote in the final. In the public vote, Norway received an average rank of 7.14, while with the jury vote, Norway received an average rank of 8.23. In the second semi-final, Norway placed fourth with the public televote with an average rank of 5.50 and fourth with the jury vote with an average rank of 5.80.

Below is a breakdown of points awarded to Norway and awarded by Norway in the second semi-final and grand final of the contest. The nation awarded its 12 points to Malta in the semi-final and to Sweden in the final of the contest.

==== Points awarded to Norway ====
Points awarded to Norway (Semi-final 2)
Score	Country
12 points	Iceland; Latvia; Spain
10 points	Finland
8 points	Georgia; Romania; Switzerland
7 points	Bulgaria; Hungary; Macedonia
6 points	
5 points	Armenia; Azerbaijan; Israel; San Marino
4 points	Greece
3 points	Malta
2 points	Germany
1 point	

Points awarded to Norway (Final)
Score	Country
12 points	Denmark; Finland; Sweden
10 points	Iceland
8 points	Italy; Latvia; Macedonia; Romania
7 points	Belgium; Germany; Russia; San Marino; Serbia; Switzerland
6 points	Israel; Lithuania; Netherlands
5 points	Slovenia; Spain
4 points	Cyprus; Georgia; Greece; Montenegro
3 points	Armenia; Belarus; Croatia; Estonia; Malta; Ukraine
2 points	Albania; Azerbaijan; Hungary; Moldova
1 point	Bulgaria

==== Points awarded by Norway ====
Points awarded by Norway (Semi-final 2)
Score	Country
12 points	Malta
10 points	Iceland
8 points	Finland
7 points	Greece
6 points	Romania
5 points	Azerbaijan
4 points	Armenia
3 points	Switzerland
2 points	Hungary
1 point	Bulgaria

Points awarded by Norway (Final)
Score	Country
12 points	Sweden
10 points	Malta
8 points	Netherlands
7 points	Denmark
6 points	Romania
5 points	Greece
4 points	Iceland
3 points	Belgium
2 points	Hungary
1 point	Ukraine

===== Jury Points awarded by Norway =====
Jury Points awarded by Norway (Final)

Score	Country
12 points	Sweden
10 points	Netherlands
8 points	Malta
7 Points	France
6 Points	Greece
5 Points	Belgium
4 points	Moldova
3 Points	Italy
2 Points	Romania
1 Points	Denmark
