= Chameleon (Margaret Berger album) =

Studio album by Margaret Berger
- Released: 4 October 2004 (Norway)
- Genre: Pop rock
- Label: BMG Norway (#82876-65240-2)
- Producer: Espen Berg, Hans Jørgen Støp

Margaret Berger chronology
Chameleon (2004)	Pretty Scary Silver Fairy (2006)

Professional ratings
Review scores
Source	Rating
Allmusic	3/5 stars

Chameleon is the debut album by Norwegian singer Margaret Berger. It was released by BMG Norway on 4 October 2004, five months after she placed second on Norwegian Idol. The album did not receive an official single release, but the music video for the song "Lifetime Guarantee" was awarded a Spellemannprisen.

== Track listing ==
1. "Chameleon" (Margaret Berger, Chris Sansom, Hans Jørgen Støp) – 4:27
2. "Lifetime Guarantee" (Berger, Ofstad, Jonny Sjo, Støp) – 3:15
3. "Mind Game" (Espen Berg, Berger, Simen M. Eriksrud, Støp) – 4:41
4. "Simple Mind" (Berger, Støp) – 3:01
5. "Both Sides" (Berger, Støp) – 4:16
6. "This is Perfect" (Berger, Støp)
7. "Elephant" (Berger, Støp) – 5:40
8. "Pleasure" (Ell, Hedstrom) – 3:36
9. "Main Offender" (Støp) – 3:52
10. "Still" (Berg, Berger, Vidar Bergethon Holm, Støp) – 4:37

== Personnel ==
- Espen Berg – Bass, Guitar, Programming, Producer, Mixing, Recording
- Margaret Berger – Vocals
- Björn Engelmann at Cutting Room Studios – Mastering
- Simen M. Eriksrud – Keyboards, Programming, Mixing
- Mats Hedström – Programming
- Erik Holm – Drum Programming
- Vidar Bergethon Holm – Bass, Guitar
- Olav Torgeir Kopland – Guitar
- Sjur Milieteig – Trumpet
- Chris Sansom – Mixing, Recording
- Jonny Sjo – Bass
- Hans Jørgen Støp – Bass, Guitar, Keyboards, Vocals (background), Producer, Recording
- Espen Strøm – Guitar

== Chart performance ==
Charts (2004)	Peak position
Norwegian Albums (VG-lista)	4
