= Samantha (Margaret Berger song) =

Single by Margaret Berger

from the album Pretty Scary Silver Fairy
- Released: 19 June 2006
- Genre: Electronica, dance, pop
- Length: 3:30
- Label: Sony BMG
- Songwriter(s): Jukka Immonen, Margaret Berger, Patric Sarin
- Producer(s): Jukka Immonen

Margaret Berger singles chronology
| "Samantha" (2006) | "Will You Remember Me Tomorrow?" (2006) |

"Samantha" is an electropop song performed by Norwegian singer Margaret Berger. The song was written by Jukka Immonen, Berger and Patric Sarin for her second album Pretty Scary Silver Fairy (2006). It was released as the album's lead single on 19 June 2006.

== Formats and track listings ==
These are the formats and track listings of major single releases of "Samantha".

CD single
(82876-85605-2; Released 19 June 2006)

1. "Samantha" – 3:29

Digital download
(Released 19 June 2006)

1. "Samantha" – 3:29

== Personnel ==
The following people contributed to "Samantha":

- Margaret Berger – lead vocals, backing vocals
- Jukka Immonen – production, mixing
- Thomas Eberger – mastering
- Pål Laukli – photography

== Chart performance ==
| Chart (2006) | Peak position |
|---|---|
| Norway (VG-lista) | 6 |

== Release history ==
| Region | Date | Format | Label |
|---|---|---|---|
| Norway | 19 June 2006 | Digital download, CD | Sony BMG |
