= Anine Stang =

Norwegian singer and songwriter (born 1985)

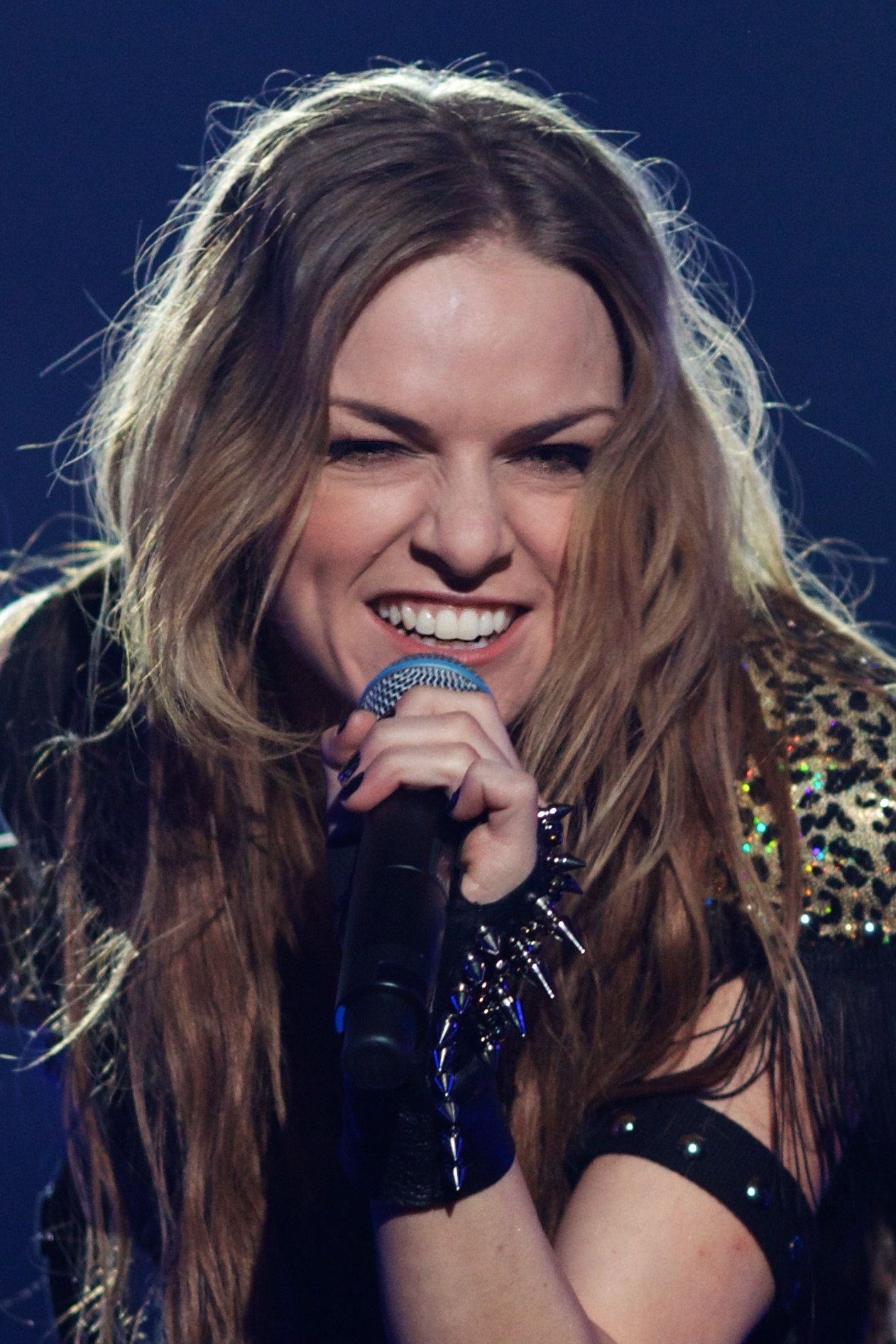
- Anine performing live

Background information
- Born: Anine Victoria Stang; Oslo, Norway
- Genres: Pop, rock
- Occupations: Singer, songwriter
- Instrument: Vocals
- Years active: 2010–present
- Labels: Electric Stardust, Phonofile Universal
- Website: aninestang.com

Anine Stang (born 25 February 1985 Anine Victoria Stang) is a Norwegian singer and songwriter.

In 2007 Anine received her music degree from the prestigious songwriters academy Musikmakarna in Sweden. The same year she moved to Los Angeles, where she got a band together and wrote songs with several acclaimed musicians. She played sold-out concerts, in among others, the world-famous rock club "The Viper Room". In 2008 she got second place in a "battle of the bands" contest under the direction of LA Music Network and rock radio station FM 98.7. The judges stated that she had the best song out of all the contestants.

In 2008/2009 Anine was mentioned in the US based magazine Music Connection's "Hot 100 unsigned artists" list.

After three years in Los Angeles, Anine moved back to Norway in 2010 and signed a deal with Universal Music. Her first music video remained on the top 10 list on MTV for several weeks, and it even impressed the world-famous celebrity blogger, Perez Hilton.

The video for her single "Dominoes" was nominated for "Best Music Video" at UK Film Festival, and it won two prices: "Award of Excellence" and "Best Cinematography" at Los Angeles Movie Awards in January 2012.

Bill Siddons, ex-manager of The Doors, was Anine's mentor during the three years in L.A. She has worked closely with musicians who have also worked with artists such as Marilyn Manson, Rihanna, Lady Gaga, Guns N' Roses, Slipknot, Debbie Harry and Thirty Seconds to Mars.

Before Christmas 2010, she released the single "Christmas Card" in benefit of the Red Cross program for children in need.

In 2011 she was handpicked by the Billboard hit making production team Stargate, to attend their masterclass in New York City. While in New York she played at Splash, New York's biggest gay club. This is the club where Lady Gaga started her career, and Madonna has played several times. The club wanted her back, and in the summer of 2011 she went on her first US tour.

Between roughly 2010 and 2013, Anine experimented with releasing songs under the artist name "Anina." Notably the singles, "Dinnertime," "Brain Break" and "The Young," which can still be seen on the Spotify artwork for those releases.

She released the song "Brain Break" on her own label "Electric Stardust", in August 2012. The UK based Scandinavian music blog "Scandipop.co.uk" called it "[s]odding mental. But it's the kind of sodding mental that lends itself well to also being sodding brilliant".

The video for "Brain Break" also received favorable reviews.

Through 2017, she was residing in Los Angeles, California, working on new material and eventually releasing the single "Badass Motherfucker" that same year.

In the intervening years she became close with Norwegian director Petter Tangmyr. The two have a daughter, Emmy Adelina, born in March 2019, with the couple returning to live in Norway ahead of her birth. More creative output followed over this period with Anine releasing three new tracks: We Got The Love, Rendezvous and All My Love. "All My Love," was notably inspired by the birth of her first child, with the album art depicting a photo of Anine while pregnant.

The couple greeted a second child, Aria Leonora (born in Oct of 2021), and during Aria's Baptism celebration, they surprised their guests and made it a joint event, becoming officially married.

Currently she and Petter reside in Nesoddtangen, Viken, just outside of Oslo. Anine's subsequent musical output is unknown, but she has been working as a DJ, along with spearheading her startup (sock subscription) company, Abonera, over the past several years while raising her family.

== Discography ==
- 2017: "Badass Motherfucker"
- 2013: "The Young" (single) (as Anina)
- 2012: "Brain Break" (single)(as Anina)
- 2011: "Dominoes" (single)
- 2010: "Christmascard" (single)
- 2010: Hits for Kids, vol. 24 – "Trying You On" (compilation)
- 2010: "Dinnertime" (single)
- 2010: "Trying You On" (single)
- 2006: "Moments of Magic" (single) (under the artist name "Anine & Lasse")
