= Silent Storm (song) =

2014 song by Carl Espen

Single by Carl Espen
- Released: 18 February 2014
- Recorded: 2013
- Genre: Pop
- Length: 2:57
- Label: RCA
- Songwriter: Josefin Winther
- Producer: Magnus Skylstad

Carl Espen singles chronology
"Silent Storm" (2014)	"Holding On" (2014)

Music video
- "Silent Storm" on YouTube

Eurovision Song Contest 2014 entry
- Country: Norway
- Artist: Carl Espen
- Languages: English
- Composer: Josefin Winther
- Lyricist: Josefin Winther

Finals performance
- Semi-final result: 6th
- Semi-final points: 77
- Final result: 8th
- Final points: 88

Entry chronology
- ◄ "I Feed You My Love" (2013)
- "A Monster Like Me" (2015) ►

Song presentation
- file; help

Official performance video
- "Silent Storm" (Semi-Final) on YouTube "Silent Storm" (Final) on YouTube

"Silent Storm" is a song by Norwegian singer and songwriter Carl Espen, released as the debut single on 18 February 2014. Described as a powerful ballad about finding one's place in life, it was written by Josefin Winther and produced by Magnus Skylstad. The song represented Norway in the Eurovision Song Contest 2014 in Copenhagen, Denmark after winning Melodi Grand Prix 2014, Norway's national selection for the event. The song finished eighth overall with 88 points.

"Silent Storm" was met with positive reviews among critics, highlighting the song's vulnerability and Espen's vocal delivery. The song drew commercial success, entering the top 30 in Denmark and the Netherlands. The song also became Espen's first charting song in his home country.

== Background and composition ==
"Silent Storm" was composed and written by Espen's cousin, Josefin Winther. In an interview, he spoke of the song's development: "[Winther] knows me very well, both my personal struggles and my dream to sing. She sat down and thought about me for a long time, and then tried to write a song to express my feelings and my place in life. The result was "Silent Storm". No one else could have written this song for me."

The song has been described as an "intense, fragile and powerful ballad". Espen further described the song as about finding your place in life. Espen added, "that is something I hold dearly and I haven’t achieved yet. Its something that I miss and that I think a lot about":

"The story is that my cousin saw me for who I am, and understood that it would be good for me to express the feeling I carry inside. She felt that I was still searching for my place in the world, and that I keep many of my difficult feelings closed inside. She feels that I am calm and quiet on the outside, but that strong feeling whirl around right underneath my surface. These feelings are like a silent storm inside me. The message is this expression of my looking for a home, and also a growing hope that someday I’ll be calm."

When asked about where the inspiration for the song came from, Winther said, "Carl Espen was the source of the song, because I felt like he had something bubbling under the surface waiting to come out".

== Reception ==
Prior to the actual contest, "Silent Storm" was one of the favorites to win the Eurovision Song Contest 2014 in betting odds. "Silent Storm" was also met with general acclaim from music critics. Martin Faulkner from BBC describes "Silent Storm" as a strong song, while Samantha Ross elaborated, "there’s something so appealing about a guy who looks like he could take down trees with his bare hands going on and singing so sweetly about his vulnerabilities and emotions". Multiple critics from Wiwibloggs also positively reviewed the song, applauding Espen's vocal delivery and the song's vulnerability. William Lee Adams from Wiwibloggs further elucidated: "Carl’s voice carries melanchaly [sic] well, and any imperfections actually work in his favor. The occasional cracks and warbles fit with a performance about human frailty. Unlike so many Eurovision ballads, “Silent Storm” doesn't rely on Carl singing louder and louder. His emotions are real. He drives the song with sincerity."

Dennis Van Eersel from ESC Daily described the song as a very emotional song, with interesting lyrics. He further added, "I like how the text doesn’t match the appearance of the singer. It gives it even more strength to me, because you can never judge a book by it's [sic] cover and know what really goes on in someone else’s mind." Eurovision Song Contest 2013 winner Emmelie de Forest said that the song is her great favorite, and liked the song upon listening to it and have followed Espen through the Norwegian national selection. She also described the song as having a nice lyrics and melody.

== Eurovision Song Contest 2014 ==
=== Melodi Grand Prix 2014 ===
Melodi Grand Prix 2014 was the 52nd edition of the Norwegian national final Melodi Grand Prix and selected Norway's entry for the Eurovision Song Contest 2014. For 2014, the competition consisted of three semi-finals on 7 to 9 March 2014 and a final on 15 March 2014. Five songs competed in each semi-final and the top three entries qualified to the final, determined exclusively by public televoting. In the final, the top four entries will be selected from the nine qualified entries to go through to the Gold Final. In the Gold Final, the results of the public televote were revealed by Norway's five regions.

Espen was officially announced to compete in Melodi Grand Prix 2014 on 27 January 2014. "Silent Storm" was drawn to compete in the third semi-final, and later qualified to the final. In the final, the song would move on to the Gold Final, along with three other entries. The song eventually won the Gold Final and the Norwegian spot for the Eurovision Song Contest 2014.

=== At Eurovision ===
The Eurovision Song Contest 2014 took place at the B&W Hallerne in Copenhagen, Denmark, and consisted of two semi-finals held on the respective dates of 6 and 8 May, and the final on 10 May 2014. During the allocation draw on 20 January 2014, Norway was drawn to compete in the second semi-final, performing in the first half of the show. Espen was later drawn to perform third in the semi-final, behind Israel's Mei Finegold and ahead of Georgia's The Shin and Mariko.

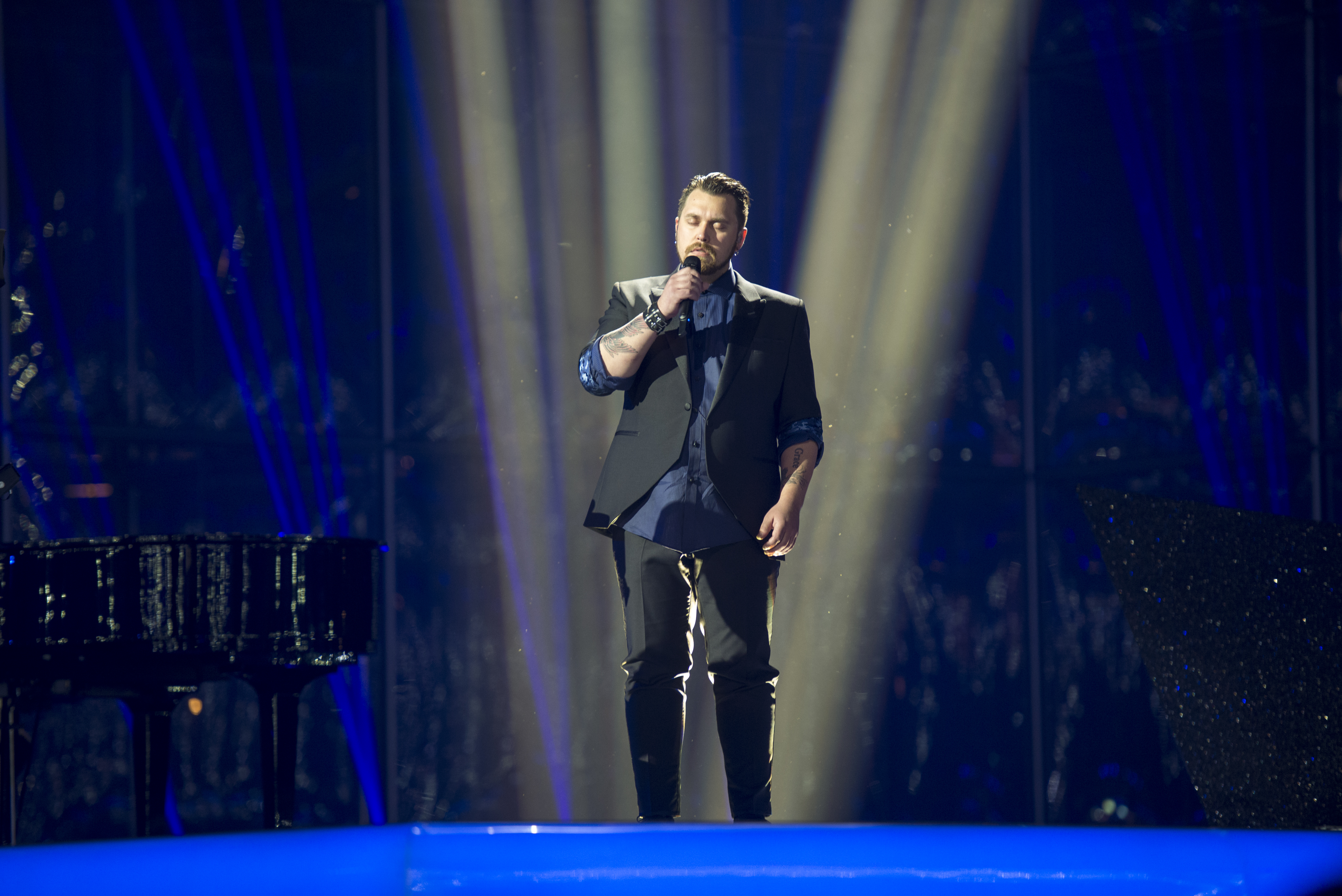
Espen performing "Silent Storm" in a dress rehearsal before the Eurovision 2014 second semi-final.

For the Eurovision performance of "Silent Storm", Espen is accompanied by a pianist and four violinists who were standing on a sloped pedestal. Artificial smoke covered the stage floor in the beginning of the performance, removed by what is described as a "silent storm created by the wind machines when the chorus was on". The performance also featured images of dark moving waves appearing on the giant LED screens at the back of the stage. The waves also move with the song's tempo. Spots then lit up from the back of the stage with what resembles a starry night scene, forming the walls surrounding the stage. The end reverts to the dark setting, with all lights centred on Espen. "Silent Storm" finished in sixth, receiving 77 points, and securing a spot in the grand final.

Espen performed a repeat of his performance in the grand final on 10 May, performing in fifth, ahead of Iceland's Pollapönk and before Romania's duo of Paula Seling and Ovi. After the results were announced, Espen finished eighth with a combined vote of 88 points, finishing ninth from the jury vote and 17th from the televote. No sets of 12 points were given by any country; the maximum given was 10 points by the Netherlands.

After the contest, Espen expressed satisfaction regarding the results. He further added, "it is a great honor to be one of the top ten in the Eurovision Song Contest."

== Track listing ==
- Digital download/streaming
1. " Silent Storm" – 2:57
- Digital download/streaming — Karaoke version
1. " Silent Storm" (Karaoke version) – 2:55
- Digital download/streaming — Rykkinnfella remix
1. "Silent Storm" (Rykkinnfella Remix) – 3:41

== Charts ==
Chart performance for "Silent Storm"
Chart (2014)	Peak position
Austria (Ö3 Austria Top 40)	39
Belgium (Ultratip Bubbling Under Flanders)	29
Belgium (Ultratip Bubbling Under Wallonia)	45
Denmark (Tracklisten)	28
Finland Download (Latauslista)	20
Germany (GfK)	47
Ireland (IRMA)	34
Netherlands (Single Top 100)	20
Norway (IFPI Norge)	37
Scottish Singles Sales (Official Charts)	90
Switzerland (Schweizer Hitparade)	40
UK Singles (Official Charts)	97

== Certifications ==
Certifications for "Silent Storm"
Region	Certification	Certified units/sales
Norway (IFPI Norway)	Platinum	10,000^{‡}
^{‡} Sales+streaming figures based on certification alone.

== Release history ==
Release dates and formats for "Silent Storm"
Region	Date	Format(s)	Version	Label	Ref.
Various	18 February 2014	CD; digital download; streaming	Original	RCA	
Various	14 April 2014	CD; digital download; streaming	Karaoke	Universal	
Various	9 May 2014	Digital download; streaming	Rykkinnfella remix	Independent	
