= Pretty Scary Silver Fairy =

Studio album by Margaret Berger
- Released: 2 October 2006
- Recorded: Fried Music Studios (Helsinki); Matrix Studio Complex (London)
- Genre: Dance-pop; synthpop
- Length: 37:27
- Label: RCA
- Producer: Jukka Immonen; Pete "Boxsta" Martin

Margaret Berger chronology
Chameleon (2004)	Pretty Scary Silver Fairy (2006)	New Religion (2015)

Singles from Pretty Scary Silver Fairy
- 1. "Samantha" Released: 19 June 2006; 2. "Will You Remember Me Tomorrow?" Released: 2006; 3. "Robot Song" Released: 2007

Professional ratings
Review scores
Source	Rating
AllMusic	4.5/5 stars
Stylus Magazine	B+

Pretty Scary Silver Fairy is the second studio album by Norwegian recording artist Margaret Berger. It was released in Norway on 2 October 2006 by RCA Records. Its title comes from Berger's wish for the album to be "sweet but mean at the same time". The lyrics were written by Berger and inspired by her adolescence.

== Track listing ==
No.	Title	Writer(s)	Producer(s)	Length
1.	"Silver Fairy"	Margaret Berger; Pete "Boxsta" Martin	Martin	3:58
2.	"Seek I'll Hide"	Berger; Martin	Martin	4:19
3.	"Will You Remember Me Tomorrow?"	Berger; Patric Sarin; Jukka Immonen	Immonen	3:43
4.	"Samantha"	Berger; Sarin; Immonen	Immonen	3:28
5.	"I'm Gonna Stay After Summer"	Berger; Hans Jørgen Støp	Immonen	3:54
6.	"Get Physical"	Berger; Sarin; Immonen	Immonen	2:54
7.	"Naive (16)"	Berger; Martin	Martin	3:41
8.	"Robot Song"	Berger; Sarin; Immonen	Immonen	3:30
9.	"Pretty Things in Life"	Berger; Støp	Martin	4:01
10.	"Have You Never Ever?"	Berger; Støp	Immonen	3:59

Notes

- "Silver Fairy" contains elements of "Holiday in Harlem" written by Nathaniel Reed and Chick Webb.
- "Naive (16)" contains elements of "Gentle on My Mind" written by John Hartford.

== Personnel ==
Credits adapted from the liner notes of Pretty Scary Silver Fairy.

- Margaret Berger – lead vocals (all tracks); backing vocals (1–4, 6–10)
- Joakim Bachmann – live drums (6)
- Liah Cheston – mastering
- Illi – backing vocals (5)
- Jukka Immonen – engineering, mixing, production (3–6, 8, 10); backing vocals (5)
- Krzysztof – additional strings arrangement
- Pete "Boxsta" Martin – drum programming, engineering, keyboard programming, mixing, production (1, 2, 7, 9)
- Henry Parsley – additional Pro Tools editing (1)
- Patric Sarin – additional vocals (8)
- Hans Jørgen Støp – lead synth (10)

== Charts ==
Chart (2006)	Peak position
Norwegian Albums Chart	8
