= Will You Remember Me Tomorrow? =

Single by Margaret Berger

from the album Pretty Scary Silver Fairy
- Released: 2006
- Genre: Pop, Dance
- Length: 3:34
- Label: Sony BMG
- Songwriter(s): Jukka Immonen, Margaret Berger, Patric Sarin

Margaret Berger singles chronology
"Samantha" (2006)	"Will You Remember Me Tomorrow?" (2006)	"Robot Song" (2007)

"Will You Remember Me Tomorrow?" is a song performed by Norwegian singer Margaret Berger from her second studio album Pretty Scary Silver Fairy (2006). It was released in Norway as the album's second single in 2006. The song peaked at number 13 on the Norwegian Singles Chart.

== Music video ==
A music video for "Will You Remember Me Tomorrow?" was first released onto YouTube on November 15, 2009, at a total length of three minutes and forty-one seconds.

== Track listing ==
Digital download
No.	Title	Length
1.	"Will You Remember Me Tomorrow?"	3:34

== Chart performance ==
Chart (2006)	Peak position
Norway (VG-lista)	13

== Release history ==
Region	Date	Format	Label
Norway	2006	Digital download, CD	Sony BMG
