= Carl Espen =

Norwegian singer and songwriter

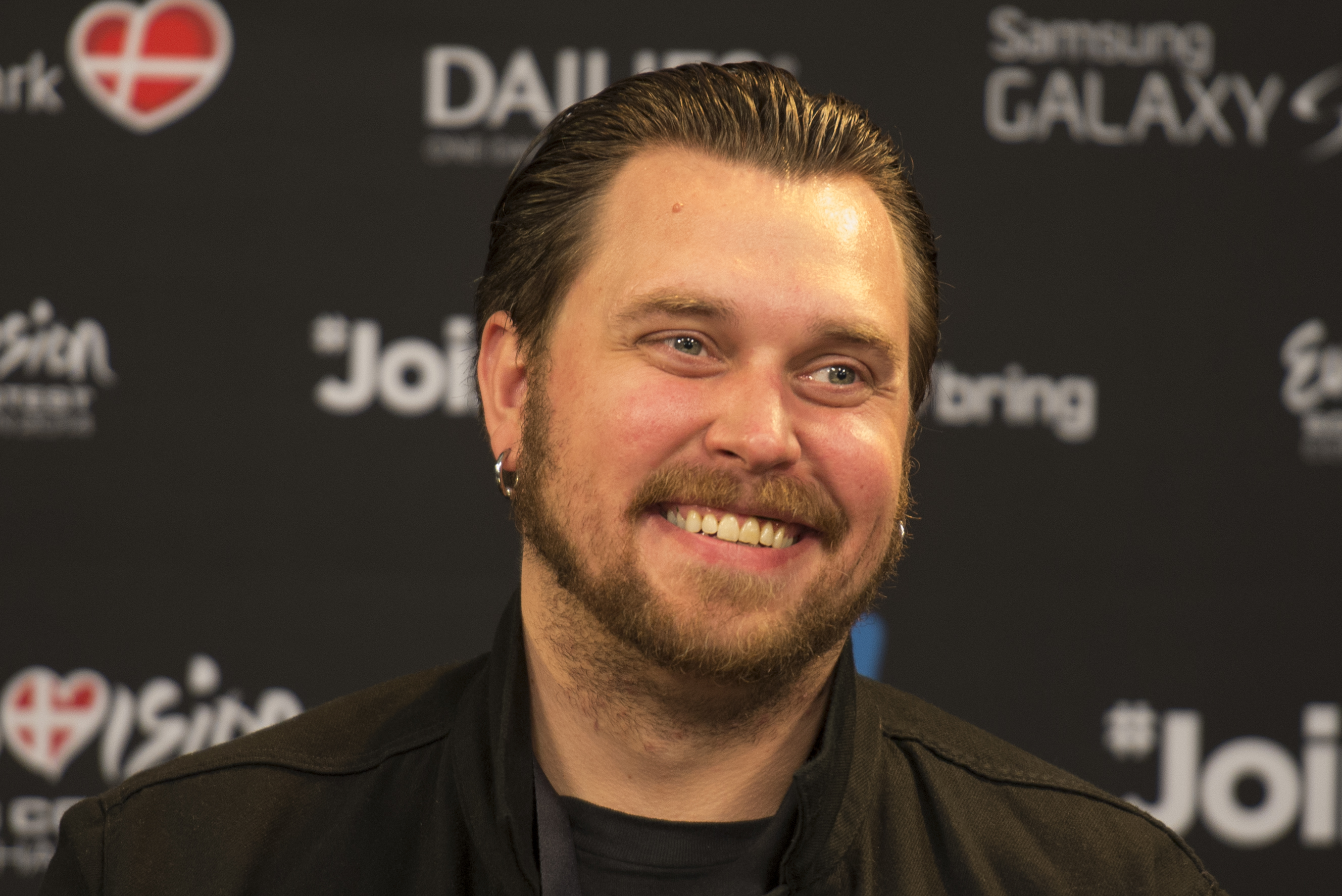
- Carl Espen (2014)

Background information
- Born: Carl Espen Thorbjørnsen; 15 July 1982 (age 44); Bergen, Norway
- Years active: 2014-present

Carl Espen Thorbjørnsen (born 15 July 1982), better known as simply Carl Espen, is a Norwegian singer and songwriter, who represented Norway in the Eurovision Song Contest 2014 with his song "Silent Storm".

== Background ==
Carl Espen was born in Bergen in 1982. The oldest of three siblings, he grew up on the island of Osterøy. He spent two years with the Norwegian Armed Forces and was stationed in Kosovo, before returning to Norway to take up work as a craftsman.

== Music career ==
Espen's first performance was at a singing contest when he was 17.

=== 2014–present: Eurovision Song Contest ===
Carl Espen presenting himself and Silent Storm in the Eurovision Song Contest 2014.

In 2014, Espen was announced as one of the contestants in Melodi Grand Prix 2014, Norway's selection process for the Eurovision Song Contest 2014, with the song "Silent Storm". The song was written by Espen's cousin, Josefin Winther.

On 9 March 2014, he qualified from the third semi-final, proceeding to the final. In the final on 15 March 2014 at the Oslo Spektrum in Oslo, he progressed to the Superfinal where he won the right to represent Norway at the Eurovision Song Contest 2014.

At Eurovision, he performed during the second semi-final on 8 May 2014 and qualified to the final. In the final, Espen placed 8th.

== Discography ==
=== Singles ===
Title	Year	Peak chart positions								Certifications	Album or EP
Title	Year	NOR	AUT	DEN	GER	IRE	NLD	SWI	UK	Certifications	Album or EP
"Silent Storm"	2014	37	39	28	47	34	20	40	97	IFPI NOR: Platinum	Non-album singles
"Holding On"	2014	—	—	—	—	—	—	—	—	—N/a	Non-album singles
"—" denotes a single that did not chart or was not released in that territory.

=== Other appearances ===
Title	Year	Album or EP
"Kan du se meg no?"	2016	Winthersanger
