= I Feed You My Love =

2013 single by Margaret Berger

Single by Margaret Berger
- Released: 23 January 2013
- Genre: Electronic; electropop
- Length: 3:02
- Label: Macho Records
- Songwriter(s): Karin Park; Niklas Olovson and Robin Lynch
- Producer(s): MachoPsycho

Margaret Berger singles chronology
"In A Box" (2011)	"I Feed You My Love" (2013)	"Human Race" (2013)

Music video
- "I Feed You My Love" on YouTube

Eurovision Song Contest 2013 entry
- Country: Norway
- Artist(s): Margaret Berger
- Language: English
- Composer(s): Karin Park; MachoPsycho
- Lyricist(s): Karin Park; MachoPsycho

Finals performance
- Semi-final result: 3rd
- Semi-final points: 120
- Final result: 4th
- Final points: 191

Entry chronology
- ◄ "Stay" (2012)
- "Silent Storm" (2014) ►

"I Feed You My Love" is a song recorded by Norwegian singer Margaret Berger. The song was written by Karin Park and MachoPsycho and produced by MachoPsycho. It is best known as Norway's entry to the Eurovision Song Contest 2013 held in Malmö, Sweden. The song competed in the second semi-final on 16 May 2013 and qualified for a spot in the final on 18 May 2013. In the final, the song received the top score of 12 points from three countries (Denmark, Sweden, Finland), and finished fourth overall with a total score of 191 points.

== Composition ==
"I Feed You My Love" is an electronic and electropop song written in B minor and set in common time. The song has a sparse arrangement over lush strings and starts with a dark electroclash riff that contrasts with Berger’s delicate vocals. The introduction of drums halfway through the first verse and synthesized strings during the chorus help provide build. According to lyricist Karin Park, the song is "about having the courage and strength to do what you want".

== Track listing ==
Digital download

1. I Feed You My Love – 3:02

Digital download

1. I Feed You My Love (Extended Version) – 3:19

Remixes EP

1. I Feed You My Love – 3:02
2. I Feed You My Love (Macho Collective Remix) – 3:15
3. I Feed You My Love (Robin Low Remix) – 6:15
4. I Feed You My Love (Jay Hardway Remix) – 4:58
5. I Feed You My Love (Dan Miles & Di Ferro Remix) – 6:11
6. I Feed You My Love (Torus Flow Remix) – 6:11
7. Video: I Feed You My Love (Official Norwegian ESC Entry) – 3:11
8. Video: I Feed You My Love (Official Promo Video) – 3:02

== Reception ==
Commenting on Berger's interpretation of the song, Karin Park noted that "she does it amazingly well". Ann Gripper from Daily Mirror wrote that Berger starts the song with "a Bjork-esque fragile icy burr—perfect for the ice queen being woken from the snow she sings of". Michael Cragg from The Guardian described the song as "spectacular" and Sam Lansky from popular online music blog Idolator wrote that the song is "aggressive and ferocious, with a chorus that's huge and loud... it's a gloriously pummeling pop track that's as weird as it is infectious". At ESC Review the song has been described as the "most contemporary entry" in Eurovision 2013, following in the path of the similarly modern Loreen's "Euphoria".

== Charts ==
Chart (2013)	Peak position
Austria (Ö3 Austria Top 40)	51
Belgium (Ultratip Bubbling Under Flanders)	24
Denmark (Tracklisten)	36
Finland Download (Latauslista)	3
Germany (GfK)	24
Iceland (RÚV)	7
Ireland (IRMA)	54
Netherlands (Single Top 100)	49
Norway (VG-lista)	4
Sweden (Sverigetopplistan)	33
Switzerland (Schweizer Hitparade)	26
UK Singles (Official Charts Company)	80
UK Indie (OCC)	13

== Certifications ==
Region	Certification	Certified units/sales
Norway (IFPI Norway)	Platinum	10,000^{*}
^{*} Sales figures based on certification alone.
