= Karin Park =

Swedish-Norwegian singer-songwriter

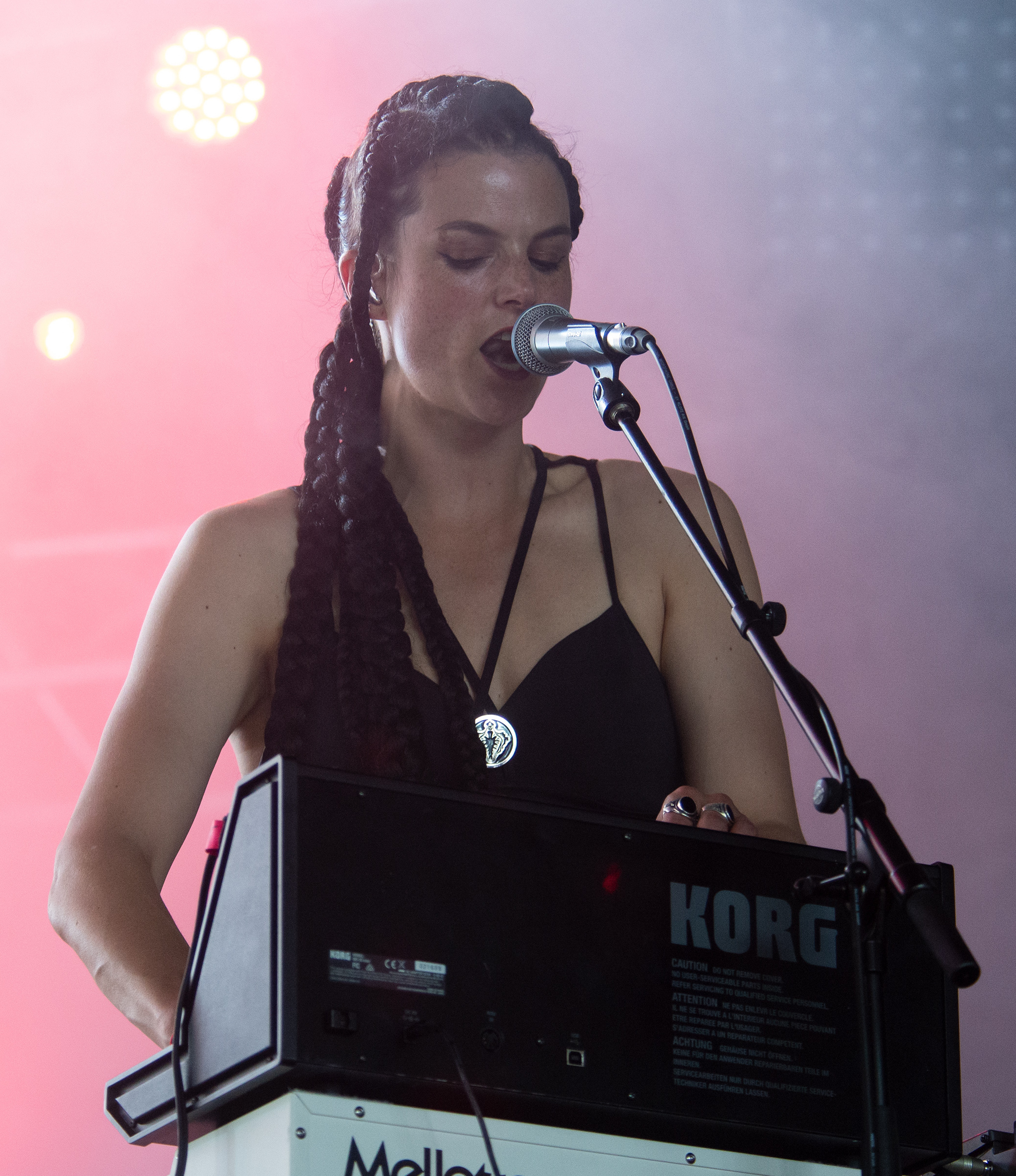
- Park at Hellfest 2019

Background information
- Born: 6 September 1978 (age 47); Djura, Sweden
- Origin: Bergen, Norway
- Genres: Synthpop; indietronica; electroclash; industrial
- Occupation: Singer-songwriter
- Years active: 2003–present
- Labels: Djura Missionshus; State of the Eye; Young Aspiring Professionals; Superworldmusic; Waterfall; Universal
- Website: karinpark.com

Karin Maria Erika Park (born 6 September 1978) is a Swedish-Norwegian singer-songwriter. Park was born and raised in Sweden, but began her musical career in Bergen, Norway.

== Career ==
Karin Park made her debut in 2003 with the single Superworldunknown (also album title). She was nominated "Newcomer of the Year" and "Best Female Pop Artist" at Spellemannprisen 2004 and was awarded the Alarmprisen 2004, Lydverketprisen for Newcomer of the Year.

The single Superworldunknown was also nominated for "Norway's Best Song of all Times", by the journal Spirit and Norway's biggest radio station P3.

After the release of her second album Change Your Mind (2006), the music developed in a new, darker and more synth-based direction.

The third album, Ashes to Gold (2009), was produced by Fredrik Saroea, frontman of the Norwegian band Datarock.

Following this record, Karin has continued to develop a more experimental, beat-oriented sound. Karin Park is also an eminent producer, who has done remixes for other bands and co-produced the latest Årabrot record "Who do you love" with her husband Kjetil Nernes, frontman in Årabrot.

Together with her brother David Park, Portsmouth based producer Barry Barnet and the Swedish producer Christoffer Berg (known for his work with The Knife, Fever Ray, Massive Attack and Little Dragon's Yukimi Nagano), she made her fourth album, Highwire Poetry (2012).

In 2013, Karin Park wrote Margaret Berger's "I Feed You My Love" together with Macho Psycho, Norway's entry to the Eurovision Song Contest 2013. The song provided Norway's best result in the contest since their win in 2009, placing fourth out of twenty-six competitors in the final, and scoring a total of 191 points.

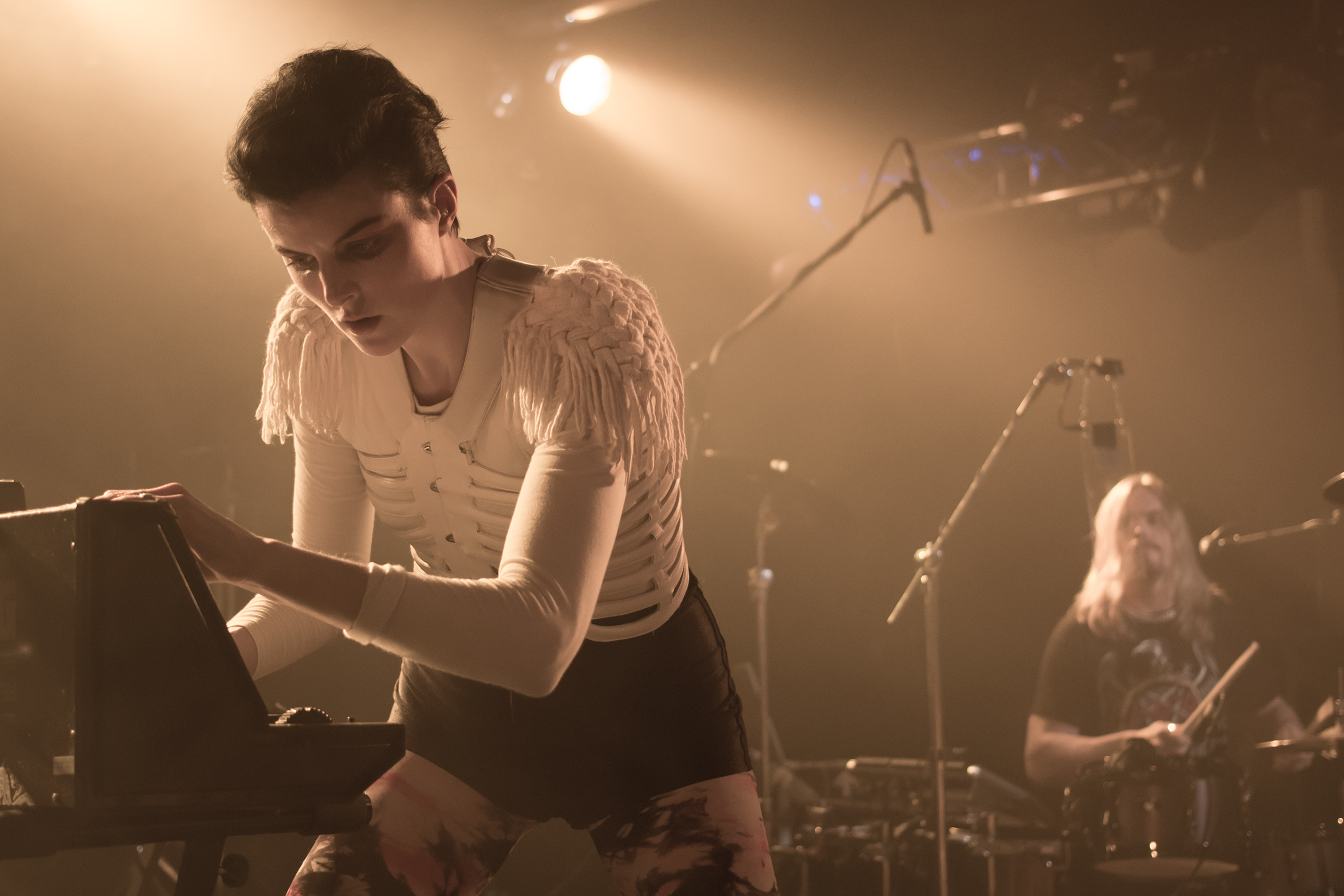
Park with her brother David live in concert in Munich, 2013

Also released in 2013, Maya Jane Coles' song "Everything" features Karin Park on guest vocals.

2014, Axtone released Axwells remix of "Tokyo by Night" with Hook n Sling and Karin Park and it went straight to no.1 on Beatport.

In 2015, she released her fifth studio album Apocalypse Pop, further expanding her sonic research while dealing with personal themes and summoning many different atmospheres.

2017–2018, Karin Park was playing the role as Fantine in Les Misérables at Folketeateret in Oslo, Norway. The show sold over a 150 000 tickets and is the most popular musical in Norwegian history.

Her new band project Pandora Drive is London based and released their first EP "Albino Heart" in 2018.

Aside from her musical career, Karin Park occasionally works as a model and an actress. She starred in the Norwegian horror film Hidden (2009) and her song Out of the Cage was the theme track to the film.

== Music ==
The music has been described as variously "electro-goth" and "industrial-pop".

Karin Park's current musical style has been compared to Fad Gadget, Gary Numan (whom she also has toured with), Depeche Mode and The Knife. Her distinctive voice has also been compared with Karin Dreijer Andersson and Björk.

She has portrayed herself as a white Grace Jones in interviews.

== Personal life ==
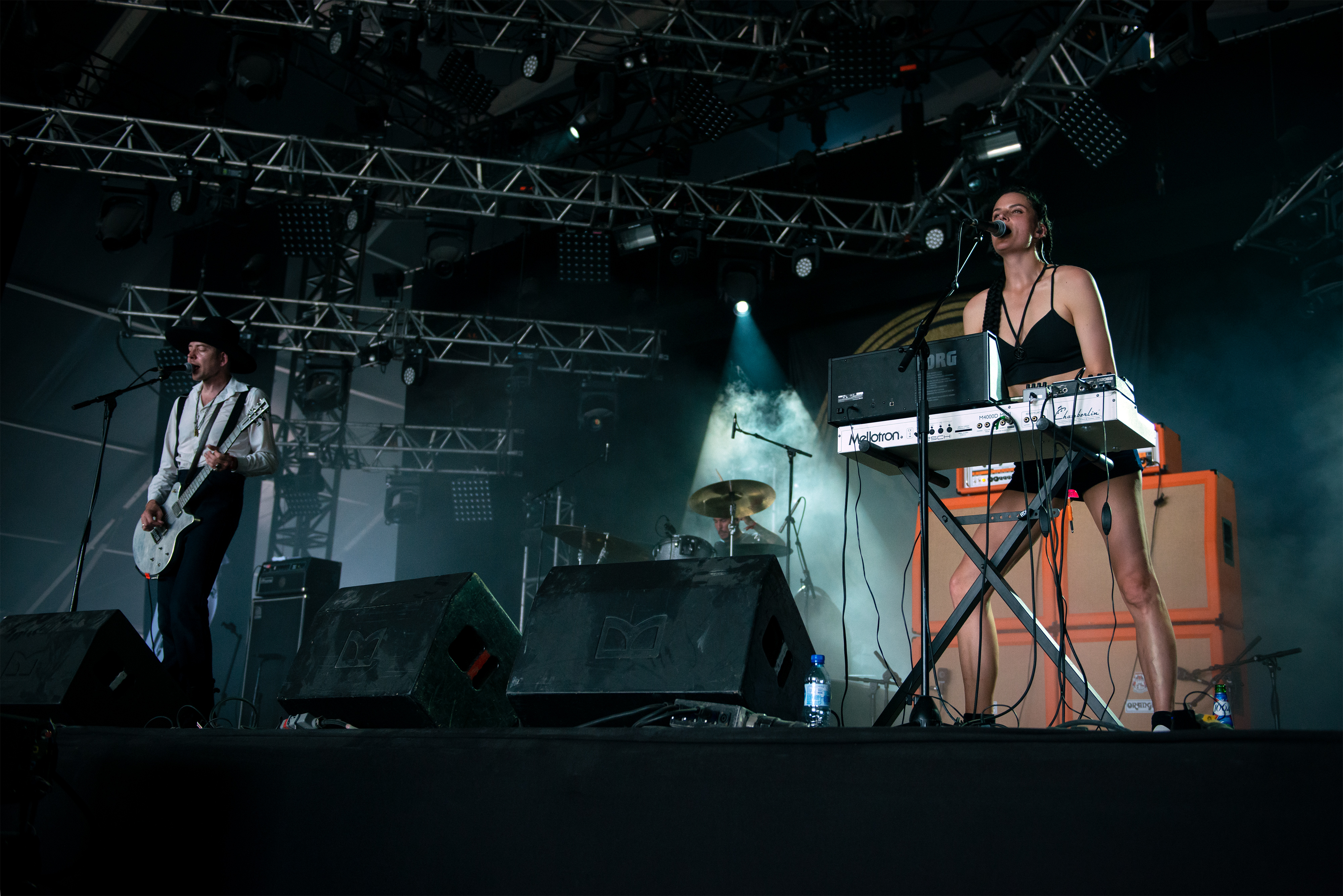
Park on stage with Kjetil Nernes at Hellfest 2019

Karin Park currently lives in Djura (Sweden), together with her husband Kjetil Nernes; songwriter and frontman of the band Årabrot. Karin also plays keyboards in the band.

== Discography ==
=== Albums ===
- Superworldunknown (Waterfall Records/Universal, 2003) NO #11
- Change Your Mind (Superworldmusic, 2006)
- Ashes To Gold (Young Aspiring Professionals, 2009) NO #32
- Highwire Poetry (State of the Eye Recordings, 2012)
- Apocalypse Pop (State of the Eye Recordings, 2015)
- Church of Imagination (Djura Missionshus, 2020)
- ALTER (collaborative album with Lustmord) (Pelagic Records, 2021)
- Private Collection (Pelagic Records, 2022)

=== Singles ===
- Superworldunknown (Waterfall Records, 2003)
- Fill It Up (Waterfall Records, 2003)
- Change Your Mind (Superworldmusic, 2006)
- Masterpiece (Superworldmusic, 2006)
- The Bachelorette (Superworldmusic, 2006)
- Can't Stop Now (Young Aspiring Professionals, 2009)
- Ashes (Young Aspiring Professionals, 2009)
- Tiger Dreams (State of the Eye Recordings, 2011)
- Fryngies (State of the Eye Recordings, 2012)
- Wildchild (State of the Eye Recordings, 2012)
- Restless (State of the Eye Recordings, 2012)
- Thousand Loaded Guns (State of the Eye Recordings, 2012)
- Shine (State of the Eye Recordings, 2014)
- Look What You've Done (State of the Eye Recordings/Cosmos Music Group, 15 March 2014)
- Life is Just a Dream/Human Beings (15 April 2015)
- Stick to the Lie (State of the Eye Recordings, 30 October 2015)
- Blue Roses EP (Djura Missionshus, 31 August 2018)
- Give (Lustmord Remix) (Djura Missionshus, 2020)
- The Rest of Your Life (feat. Aspyer) (STMPD RCRDS, 2021)
